= 66th Evening Standard Theatre Awards =

Theatre award ceremony

- Date: 11 December 2022
- Location: The Ivy
- Hosted by: Sheridan Smith

Highlights
- Most wins: Oklahoma! (2)
- Most nominations: Oklahoma! (5)

The 66th Evening Standard Theatre Awards were awarded in recognition of the 2021–2022 London Theatre season on 11 December 2022 at a ceremony at The Ivy, London. Nominations were announced on 17 October 2022. The awards ceremony was compered by Sheridan Smith and co-hosted by Evgeny Lebedev, proprietor of the London Evening Standard.

== Eligibility and nomination process ==
All new productions and performances on the London stage between 20 May 2021 and 13 October 2022 were eligible for consideration.

On this year's judging panel were Baz Bamigboye, Sarah Crompton, Nick Curtis, Farah Najib, Alice Saville and Matt Wolf; chaired by the Evening Standard's Culture Editor Nancy Durrant.

== Ceremony ==
=== Presenters ===
- Stephen Graham presented the Natasha Richardson Award for Best Actress
- Josie Rourke and Martha Plimpton presented the award for Best Director
- Ana Wintour presented the Charles Wintour Award for Most Promising Playwright
- Evgeny Lebedev presented the special awards

=== Sponsors ===
The headline sponsor was Garrard.

== Non-competitive awards ==
Special awards were given to Nica Burns and Dame Vanessa Redgrave for their outstanding contribution to and support of London theatre during the COVID-19 pandemic.

== Winners and nominees ==
Best Play	Best Musical
Best of Enemies by James Graham (Young Vic Theatre); Indecent by Paula Vogel (Menier Chocolate Factory); Red Pitch by Tyrell Williams (Bush Theatre); The Father and the Assassin by Anupama Chandrasekhar (Royal National Theatre); The Mirror and the Light by Hilary Mantel and Ben Miles (Gielgud Theatre)	Oklahoma! (Young Vic Theatre); Cabaret at the Kit Kat Club (Playhouse Theatre); Anything Goes (Barbican Theatre); Get Up Stand Up! (Lyric Theatre, Shaftesbury Avenue); Spring Awakening (Almeida Theatre)
Best Actor	Natasha Richardson Award for Best Actress
James McAvoy, Cyrano de Bergerac (Harold Pinter Theatre); Paapa Essiedu, A Number (The Old Vic); Shubham Saraf, The Father and the Assassin (Royal National Theatre); Lennie James, A Number (The Old Vic); Giles Terera, Blues for an Alabama Sky (Royal National Theatre)	Jodie Comer, Prima Facie (Harold Pinter Theatre); Samira Wiley, Blues for an Alabama Sky (Royal National Theatre); Indira Varma, The Seagull (Harold Pinter Theatre); Ronkẹ Adékoluẹjo, Blues for An Alabama Sky (Royal National Theatre); Sheila Atim, Constellations (Vaudeville Theatre)
Best Musical Performance	Milton Shulman Award for Best Director
Patrick Vaill, Oklahoma! (Young Vic Theatre); Jessie Buckley, Cabaret at the Kit Kat Club (Playhouse Theatre); Arinzé Kene, Get Up Stand Up! (Lyric Theatre, Shaftesbury Avenue); Sutton Foster, Anything Goes (Barbican Theatre); Marisha Wallace, Oklahoma! (Young Vic Theatre)	Lynette Linton, Blues for an Alabama Sky (Royal National Theatre); Jamie Lloyd, The Seagull and Cyrano de Bergerac (Harold Pinter Theatre); Daniel Fish and Jordan Fein, Oklahoma! (Young Vic Theatre); Rebecca Frecknall, Cabaret at the Kit Kat Club (Playhouse Theatre); Katie Mitchell, Little Scratch (Hampstead Theatre)
Best Design	Charles Wintour Award for Most Promising Playwright
Tom Scutt, Cabaret at the Kit Kat Club (Playhouse Theatre); Es Devlin, A Number (The Old Vic) and The Crucible (Royal National Theatre); Felix Barrett, Livi Vaughan and Beatrice Minns for The Burnt City (One Cartridge Place); Lael Jellinek and Grace Laubacher, Oklahoma! (Young Vic Theatre); Tim Hatley, Back to the Future (Adelphi Theatre) / Life of Pi (Wyndham's Theatre – with Finn Caldwell)	Tyrell Williams, Red Pitch (Bush Theatre); Dipo Baruwa-Etti, An Unfinished Man (The Yard Theatre); Waleed Akhtar, The P Word (Bush Theatre); Igor Memic, Old Bridge (Bush Theatre); Bess Wohl, Camp Siegfried (The Old Vic)
Emerging Talent Award
Isobel McArthur, Pride and Prejudice* (*sort of) (Criterion Theatre); Terique Jarrett, Daddy (Almeida Theatre); Francis Lovehall, Red Pitch (Bush Theatre); Lizzie Annis, The Glass Menagerie (Duke of York's Theatre); Daniel Raggett, Anna X (Harold Pinter Theatre)

=== Multiple awards ===
2 awards

- Oklahoma! (Young Vic Theatre)

=== Multiple nominations ===
5 nominations

- Oklahoma! (Young Vic Theatre)

4 nominations

- Cabaret at the Kit Kat Club (Playhouse Theatre)
- Blues for an Alabama Sky (Royal National Theatre)

3 nominations

- A Number (The Old Vic)
- Red Pitch (Bush Theatre)

2 nominations

- Get Up Stand Up! (Lyric Theatre, Shaftesbury Avenue)
- Anything Goes (Barbican Theatre)
- Cyrano de Bergerac (Harold Pinter Theatre)
- The Seagull (Harold Pinter Theatre)
- The Father and the Assassin (Royal National Theatre)

== See also ==
- 2020 Laurence Olivier Awards
- 2022 Laurence Olivier Awards
