= Kiln Theatre =

Theatre in Kilburn, London, England

Coordinates: 51.5433°N 0.2000°W

- Tricyle Theatre 1980–2018

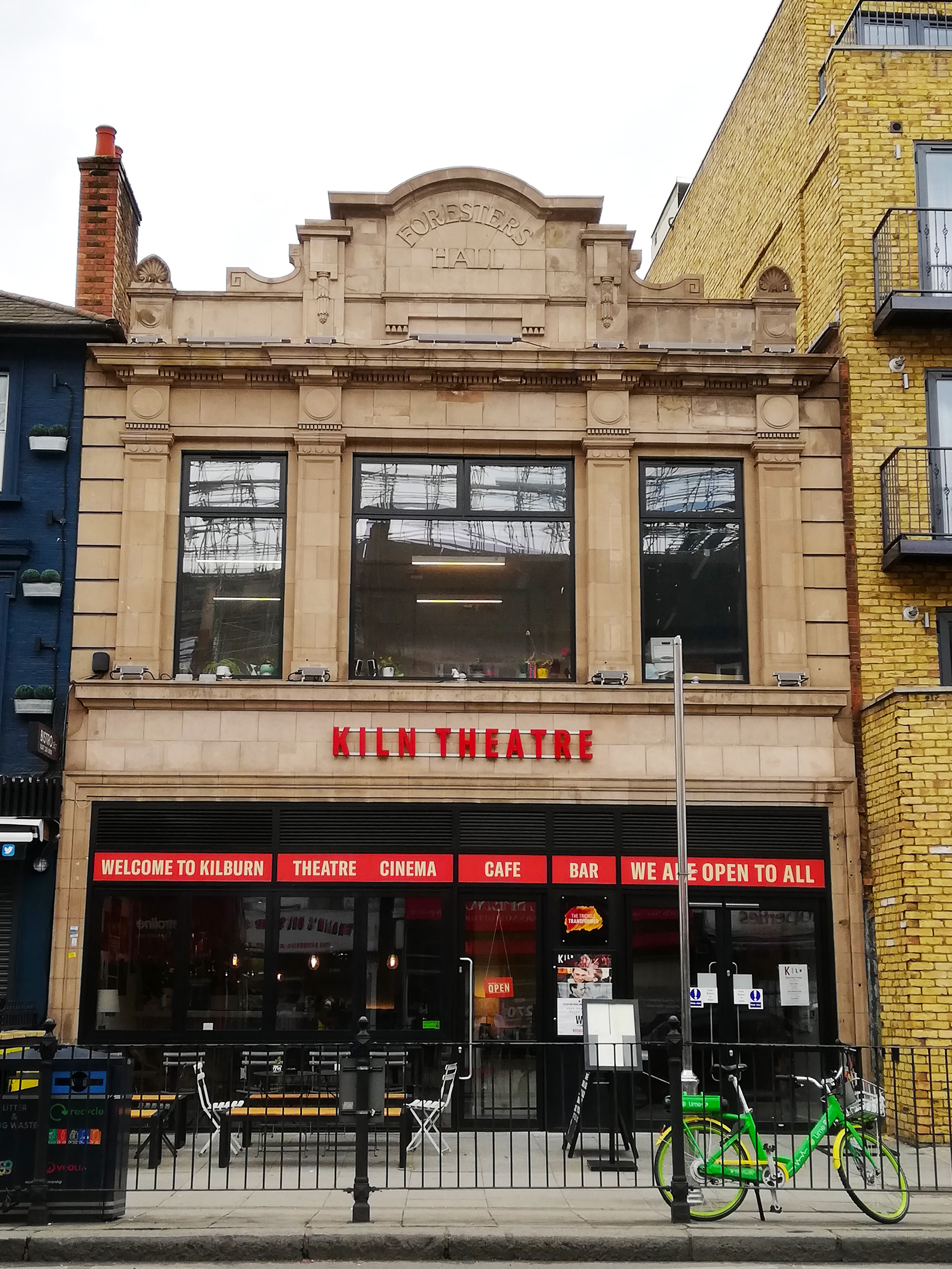
- Interactive map of Kiln Theatre
- Address: 269 Kilburn High Road; London, NW6; United Kingdom
- Owner: Kiln Theatre Ltd
- Capacity: 292
- Public transit: Brondesbury; Kilburn

Construction
- Opened: 1980
- Rebuilt: 1989, 1998, 2018
- Years active: 1980–present
- Architects: Tim Foster Architects; Chapman Architects

Website
- kilntheatre.com

The Kiln Theatre (formerly the Tricycle Theatre) is a theatre located in Kilburn, in the London Borough of Brent, England. Since 1980, the theatre has presented a wide range of plays reflecting the cultural diversity of the area, as well as new writing, political work and verbatim reconstructions of public inquiries.

The theatre has produced original work by playwrights such as Lynn Nottage, Patrick Barlow, Richard Bean, David Edgar, Stephen Jeffreys, Abi Morgan, Simon Stephens, Roy Williams, Lolita Chakrabarti, Moira Buffini, Alexi Kaye Campbell, Florian Zeller, Ayad Akhtar and Zadie Smith.

The theatre was founded in 1980 by Ken Chubb and Shirley Barrie. The current artistic director is Amit Sharma, who succeeded Indhu Rubasingham, in December 2023, who in turn had succeeded Nicolas Kent in 2012.

The theatre's name was changed from the Tricycle to Kiln Theatre in April 2018.

== History ==
=== Wakefield Tricycle Company ===
The theatre opened on the Kilburn High Road in 1980 as the permanent home of the Wakefield Tricycle Company, a touring theatre company that was known for producing British premieres, new writing, children's shows and theatre for the community in London and south-east England. The Wakefield Tricycle Company had been started in 1972 by Ken Chubb and Shirley Barrie, performing initially in a room behind the Pindar of Wakefield pub in King's Cross. The name Wakefield Tricycle Company was adopted as a pun on the Wakefield Cycle of mystery plays, the pub's name and the fact that the initial company had three members.

The company commissioned new plays which it presented at arts centres around the country and then brought into small London theatres, such as The Bush and King's Head. The Wakefield Tricycle produced more than 60 plays including works by Sam Shepard, John Antrobus, Olwen Wymark and co-founder Barrie.

=== The building ===
After securing the support of Brent London Borough Council, the Greater London Council and Arts Council England, the company was given a lease and began converting the Foresters' Hall on the Kilburn High Road into the Tricycle Theatre ("Wakefield" being dropped from the company's name at this point), opting for this space due to the lack of local entertainment facilities for the residents of Kilburn at the time. The Foresters' Hall, which was built for the Ancient Order of Foresters, had previously been used for various purposes, including as a cinema and as a music and dance hall and as temporary offices for Brent Housing Department and Rent Tribunal.

The then 235-seat auditorium, designed by architect Tim Foster and theatre consultant Iain Mackintosh, was modelled on the Georgian Theatre Royal in Richmond, Yorkshire. It was built using free-standing system-scaffolding that supported padded benches rather than individual seats. The pre-existing proscenium arch was in front of a stage so shallow as to be almost useless, so a large apron was built to take the acting area out into "the courtyard", leaving the old stage as almost a backstage area, frequently unused in productions, but leaving the theatre with the oddity of a proscenium arch framing a small rear, inner acting area.

In 1987, the theatre suffered a devastating fire that spread from a neighbouring timber yard and which seriously damaged the building. However, after extensive fundraising, the theatre was rebuilt and reopened in 1989, with only minor alterations.

In 1998, a 300-seat cinema was added to the complex, and in 2001 the Creative Space was built for the theatre's extensive education and community work. All stages of the development were designed by Tim Foster Architects (now Foster Wilson Size).

In July 2016, the theatre began to refurbish the theatre auditorium and front of house spaces, led by Chapman Architects. In April 2018, the theatre announced its planned reopening in September 2018, as well as the 2018/19 season of plays.

The refurbished building opened on 5 September 2018 with:

- A new auditorium with a flexible stage
- Increased capacity in the auditorium (292 seats) and individual seating
- Eight wheelchair positions within the auditorium with access at stalls level and increased accessibility in front of house and backstage areas
- Additional toilets
- New façade and street-facing café
- Technical bridges and increased access to technical equipment

=== Renaming ===
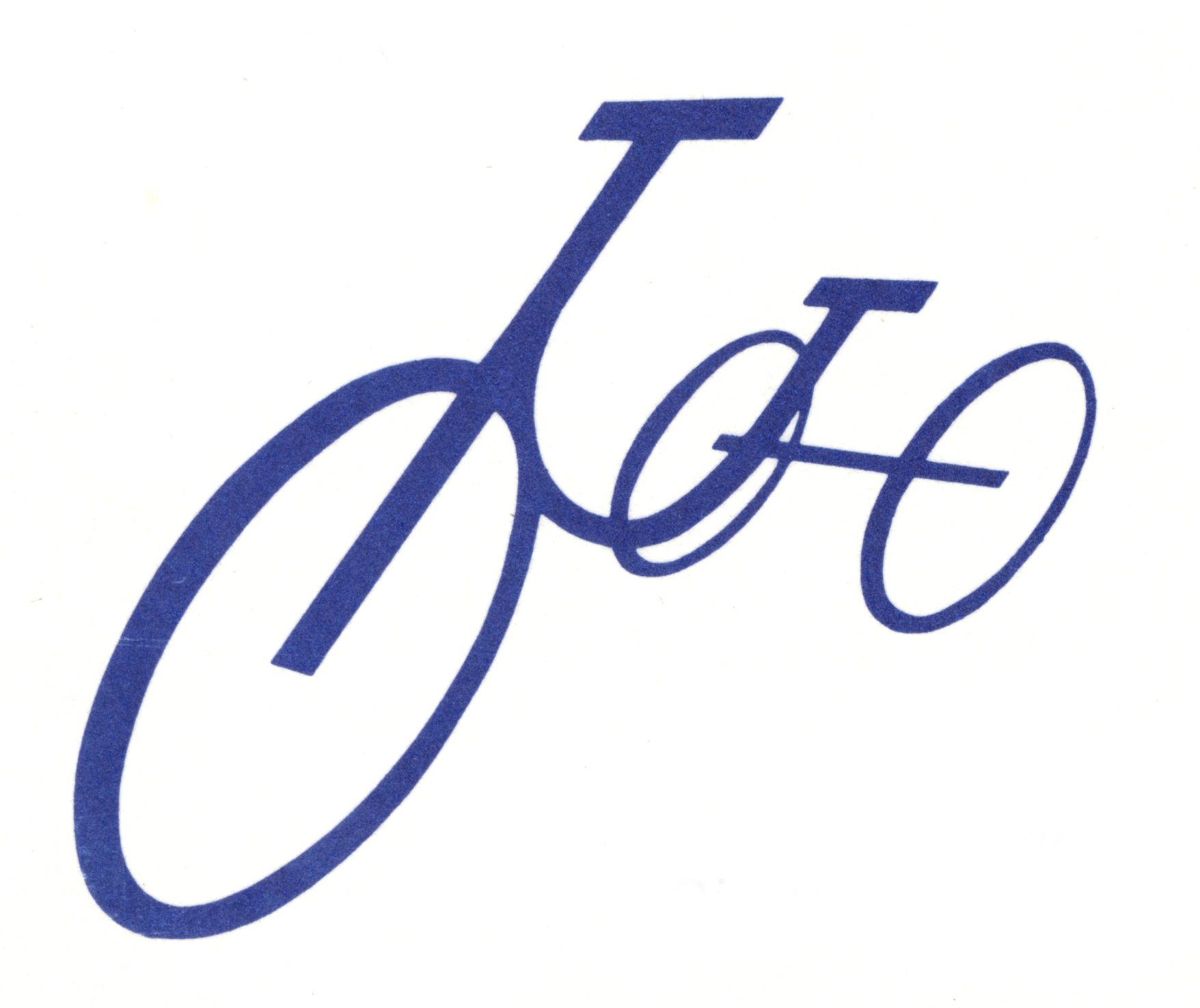
Tricycle logo from 1980 -2018

In April 2018 the theatre was renamed as Kiln Theatre. Artistic director Indhu Rubasingham said that the new name helped strengthen the venue's association with the Kilburn area and that kilns also have a relationship with all cultures around the world, and are symbols of creativity and culture. Following this, a public petition was launched arguing that the name change was "unnecessary, costly and squanders the established reputation of The Tricycle". As of July 2018 the petition was reported to have received over 2,000 signatures. The theatre received public support from various industry professionals, including an open letter in The Guardian from actors Jim Carter and Imelda Staunton and articles from critics Lyn Gardner and Matt Trueman, as well as arts writer Jessie Thompson. In September 2018 The Stage published an open letter in support of Kiln Theatre, including signatures from Richard Bean, Moira Buffini, Dominic Cooke, David Eldridge, Rebecca Lenkiewicz, Simon Stephens and Erica Whyman.

Later that month, The Guardian published an open letter opposed to the name change, including signatures from both former Artistic Directors (Ken Chubb and Nicolas Kent) and 13 others, including several former Trustees (Pam Jordan, Tim Foster, Nicholas Allott, Mark Cummins, Rosalie Horner, Martin Dives, Errol Lloyd, Mustapha Matura, Janet Mokades, Andree Molyneux, Stephen Phillips and James Shillingford). In October 2018, the Camden New Journal published an open letter calling for the name of the Tricycle Theatre to be reinstated, signed by Sally Greengross, Michael Codron, Lord Cashman, Ken Livingstone, Clive Hirschhorn, Martin Yates, Anita Dobson, Christopher Biggins, Bradley Walsh, Mark Thomas, Lesley Joseph, Les Dennis, Bobby Crush, Lorraine Chase, Mark Curry, Anne Reid, Joe Pasquale, Sandra Dickinson, Linda Hayden, Ray Cooney, Christina Lamb, Robin Soans, Paul Freeman, Joan Ann Maynard and Clarke Peters.

According to trustees, over 50% of audience members attending the 2018 reopening season were visiting the theatre for the first time.

== Artistic directors ==
In 1984, co-founder Ken Chubb turned leadership over to new artistic director Nicolas Kent, who had previously brought a successful production of Playboy of the West Indies by Mustapha Matura to the theatre with the Oxford Playhouse Company. Ken Chubb and Shirley Barrie returned shortly thereafter to their native Canada, where they have continued working in theatre and education.

In 2012, the role of artistic director was taken over by Indhu Rubasingham, who had previously worked as a guest director at the theatre working on shows such as Starstruck by Roy Williams (1998), Fabulation by Lynn Nottage (2006), The Great Game (with Nicolas Kent in 2009) and Detaining Justice by Bola Agbaje (2009).

Rubasingham stepped down in December 2023, to be replaced by Amit Sharma.

== Productions ==
=== Tricycle Theatre productions 1980s–1990s ===
Among the highpoints of the 1980s and early 1990s were productions of Return to the Forbidden Planet, Just So (a musical based on the Rudyard Kipling children's stories), the UK premiere of Alice Childress's Trouble in Mind and productions by The Black Theatre Co-operative, Carib Theatre, Druid, Field Day, Foco Novo, Market Theatre of Johannesburg, National Theatre of Brent, Paines Plough, Shared Experience, Talawa Theatre Company.

=== "Tribunal plays" ===
From 1994, during the tenure of Nicolas Kent as artistic director, the theatre established a reputation for its distinctive "tribunal plays" based on verbatim reconstructions of public inquiries.

In 1994, the theatre produced Half the Picture by Richard Norton-Taylor and John McGrath (a dramatisation of the Scott Arms to Iraq Inquiry), which was the first play ever to be performed in the Houses of Parliament. This was the first of a series of plays that have subsequently become known as the Tricycle Tribunal Plays. The next, marking the 50th anniversary of the 1946 War Crimes Tribunal, was Nuremberg, which was followed by Srebrenica – the UN Rule 61 Hearings, which later transferred to the National Theatre and the Belfast Festival at Queen's.

In 1999, the theatre's reconstruction of The Stephen Lawrence Inquiry – The Colour of Justice received critical and public acclaim, The Guardian calling it "the most vital piece of theatre on the London stage". It went on to play for two weeks at Theatre Royal, Stratford East and transferred to the Victoria Palace in the West End. It completed a national tour in 1999 which included the Belfast Festival and the National Theatre.

In 2003, Justifying War – Scenes from the Hutton Inquiry opened at the theatre.

In 2004, the theatre produced Guantanamo: Honor Bound to Defend Freedom written by Victoria Brittain and Gillian Slovo from spoken evidence, which transferred to the New Ambassadors Theatre in the West End and the Culture Project in New York (where Archbishop Desmond Tutu appeared in the production). In 2006 the theatre presented a performance of the play at the Houses of Parliament and also on Washington's Capitol Hill. It has since been performed around the world. Through the "Guantanamo Reading Project" there have been 25 community productions of readings of the play in the United States.

Bloody Sunday: Scenes from the Saville Inquiry opened in 2005 and later transferred to Belfast, Derry and to the Abbey Theatre for the Dublin Theatre Festival. In 2006, the theatre was awarded an Evening Standard Special Drama Award for "pioneering political work", and a Laurence Olivier Award for Outstanding Achievement for Bloody Sunday.

In 2007, Called to Account – the indictment of Tony Blair for the crime of aggression against Iraq – a hearing was staged at the Tricycle with evidence from American political lobbyist Richard Perle, the Chilean Ambassador to the United Nations Security Council in 2003, Juan Gabriel Valdes, and ex-Cabinet Minister Clare Short.

In 2010, Nicolas Kent, Indhu Rubasingham and the Tricycle Theatre were awarded a Human Rights Award from Liberty for "their proud record of highlighting some of the most important human rights issues of the day". The award named several of the tribunal plays.

Several of these plays have been broadcast by the BBC on radio or television.

=== Productions 2006–2012 ===
- The 39 Steps adapted by Patrick Barlow (10 August − 9 September 2006)
- Fabulation, or the Re-Education of Undine by Lynn Nottage (14 September − 21 October 2006)
- Called to Account edited by Richard Norton-Taylor (19 April − 9 June 2007)
- Moonlight & Magnolias by Ron Hutchinson (September 2007 − 3 November 2007; revived 2 July − 2 August 2008)1 *Doubt: A Parable by John Patrick Shanley (22 November 2007 − 12 January 2008)
- Let There Be Love by Kwame Kwei-Armah (17 January − 16 February 2008; revived 5 − 30 August 2008)
- Radio Golf by August Wilson (2 October − 1 November 2008)
- Loot by Joe Orton, starring Matt Di Angelo, David Haig and Doon Mackichan (11 December 2008 – 31 January 2009)
- The Great Game: Afghanistan – A festival that included 12 newly commissioned short plays by Richard Bean, David Edgar, David Greig, Amit Gupta, Ron Hutchinson, Stephen Jeffreys, Abi Morgan, Ben Ockrent, J. T. Rogers, Simon Stephens, Colin Teevan and Joy Wilkinson (17 April − 14 June 2009). The production, which received an Olivier Award Nomination for Outstanding Achievement, returned to the Tricycle in the autumn of 2010, before embarking on a tour of the US
- Not Black and White by Roy Williams, Kwame Kwei-Armah and Bola Agbaje (8 October − 19 December 2009), a season of full-length plays looking at 21st-century London from a black perspective
- Greta Garbo Came to Donegal (7 January – 20 February 2010) by Frank McGuinness
- Women, Power and Politics (4 June − 17 July 2010). Following the 2010 General Election, the Tricycle presented a season of twelve new plays that examined both the history of women's role in politics, and the complex issues surrounding women's participation and role in contemporary governments
- Broken Glass by Arthur Miller (10 August − 10 September 2010)
- The Riots, written by Gillian Slovo from spoken evidence (17 November − 10 December 2011; transferred to the Bernie Grant Arts Centre 4 − 14 January 2012)
- The Bomb – a partial history with plays by Lee Blessing, John Donnelly, Elena Gremina, Amit Gupta, Zinnie Harris, Ron Hutchinson (9 February – 1 April 2012)
- Lover's Rock Monologues, the story of how a subgenre of reggae born in the UK defined a generation in the late 1970s and 1980s and had huge impact on British pop culture (9–14 July 2012)
- Jazz at Cafe Society, a show about the 1940s New York Cafe Society nightclub, written and produced by Alex Webb, narrated by DJ and BBC Radio presenter Max Reinhardt and featuring Gwyneth Herbert, Alexander Stewart and China Moses (16–21 July 2012)

=== Productions 2012–2020 ===
Productions between 2012 and 2020 included:

- Red Velvet, a world premiere of a play by Lolita Chakrabarti and directed by Indhu Rubasingham. It was based on the life of Ira Aldridge, the first black actor to play Othello on a London stage in 1833 (played 11 October – 24 November 2012; revived 23 January 2014 – 15 March 2014; transferred to New York 25 March – 20 April 2014). The production received awards for Most Promising Playwright and Best Actor at the Evening Standard Award and Critics' Circle Theatre Awards, and transferred to the West End in 2016 as part of the Kenneth Branagh season at the Garrick.
- The Arabian Nights by Mary Zimmerman, adapted from The Book of the Thousand Nights and One Night (30 November 2012 – 12 January 2013)
- Paper Dolls by Philip Himberg, a play about a Filipino drag act in Tel Aviv (28 February – 28 April 2013)
- Bracken Moor by Alexi Kaye Campbell, presented by Shared Experience and the Tricycle Theatre (6 June – 20 July 2013)
- A Boy and His Soul by Colman Domingo, a play about growing up in Philadelphia with Soul music (4 September – 21 September 2013)
- Handbagged by Moira Buffini, directed by Indhu Rubasingham (October 2013). In 2014 Handbagged transferred to the Vaudeville Theatre in London's West End, and the Tricycle Theatre received an Olivier Award for "Outstanding Achievement in an Affiliate Theatre". The play was nominated for an Olivier Award for "Best Comedy" and went on national tour in 2015.
- The Colby Sisters of Pittsburgh, Pennsylvania by Adam Bock (19 June − 26 July 2014)
- The Kilburn Passion by Suhayla El-Bushra, presented by the Young Company's 19–25 Ensemble (5 – 9 August 2014)
- The House That Will Not Stand by Marcus Gardley (9 October – 29 November 2014)
- Lionboy, from the novel by Zizou Corder, adapted by Marcelo Dos Santos and Complicité (17 December 2014 – 10 January 2015)
- Multitudes by John Hollingworth(19 February – 21 March 2015)
- The Dissidents by Shamser Sinha presented by the Young Company's 19–25 Ensemble (26 – 28 March 2015)
- After Electra by April De Angelis (7 April – 2 May 2015)
- The Father by Florian Zeller, in a translation by Christopher Hampton (7 May – 13 June 2015). This show transferred to the West End in September 2015 and won Kenneth Cranham an Olivier Award for Best Actor.
- A Wolf in Snakeskin Shoes by Marcus Gardley (8 October – 14 November 2015)
- Ben Hur by Patrick Barlow (19 November 2015 – 9 January 2016)
- The Mother by Florian Zeller (21 January – 12 March 2016)
- The Invisible Hand by Ayad Akhtar (12 May – 2 July 2016)
- The Great Wave by Francis Turnly (co-production with the National Theatre, 10 March – 14 April 2018)
- Holy Sh!t by Alexis Zegerman (5 September – 6 October 2018)
- White Teeth by Stephen Sharkey, adapted from the novel by Zadie Smith (world premiere, 26 October – 22 December 2018)
- Approaching Empty by Ishy Din (co-production with Tamasha and Live Theatre, world premiere, 9 January – 2 February 2019)
- The Son by Florian Zeller (UK premiere, 20 February – 6 April 2019). This show transferred to the West End in Aug-Nov 2019, produced by Fiery Angel and Gavin Kalin Productions.
- The Half God of Rainfall by Inua Ellams (co-production with Fuel and Birmingham Repertory Theatre, world premiere, 26 April – 17 May 2019)
- Wife by Samuel Adamson (world premiere, 30 May – 6 July 2019)
- Blues in the Night by Sheldon Epps (18 July – 7 September 2019). This production was nominated for an Olivier Award for "Outstanding achievement in an affiliate theatre"
- The Seven Ages of Patience by Chinonyerem Odimba (world premiere, 25 – 28 September 2019)
- When the Crows Visit by Anupama Chandrasekhar (world premiere, 23 October – 30 November 2019)
- Snowflake by Mike Bartlett (10 December 2019 – 25 January 2020)
- Pass Over by Antoinette Nwandu (UK premiere, 13 February – 4 April 2020)

=== Productions 2021-present ===
Following closure due to the COVID-19 pandemic, Kiln Theatre reopened in May 2021.

- Reasons You Should(n't) Love Me by Amy Trigg (21 May – 12 June 2021) (winner of the Women's Prize for Playwriting)
- The Invisible Hand by Ayad Akhtar (1 – 31 July 2021)
- NW Trilogy by Moira Buffini, Suhayla El-Bushra and Roy Williams (6 September – 9 October 2021)
- The Wife of Willesden adapted by Zadie Smith from Chaucer's The Wife of Bath (11 November 2021 – 15 January 2022)
- Black Love by Chinonyerem Odimba (28 March – 23 April 2022)
- Girl on an Altar by Marina Carr (19 May – 25 June 2022)
- The Darkest Part of the Night by Zodwa Nyoni (14 July – 13 August 2022)
- Handbagged by Moira Buffini (10 September – 29 October 2022)
- The Wife of Willesden adapted by Zadie Smith from Chaucer's The Wife of Bath (14 December 2022 – 11 February 2023)
- Retrograde by Ryan Calais Cameron (20 April – 27 May 2023)
- Es and Flo by Jennifer Lunn
- Modest by Ellen Brammar (29 June – 15 July 2023)
- Mlima's Tale by Lynn Nottage (12 September – 21 October 2023)
- Two Strangers (Carry a Cake Across New York) by Jim Barne and Kit Buchan (9 November – 23 December 2023)
- The Frogs by Carl Grose (8 February – 2 March 2024)
- The Ballad of Hattie and James by Samuel Adamson (11 April – 19 May 2024)
- English by Sanaz Toossi (5 June – 29 June 2024)
- Peanut Butter & Blueberries by Suhaiymah Manzoor-Khan (8 – 31 August 2024)
- Pins and Needles by Rob Drummond (19 September – 26 October 2024)
- The Purists by Dan McCabe (14 November – 21 December 2024)
- The Lonely Londoners by Sam Selvon, adapted by Roy Williams (10 January – 15 February 2025)
- Shanghai Dolls by Amy Ng (3 April – 10 May 2025)
- The Ministry of Lesbian Affairs by Iman Qureshi (13 June – 15 July 2025)
- Reunion by Mark O’Rowe (11 September – 11 October 2025)
- Coven, book by Rebecca Brewer and Music and Lyrics by Daisy Chute. (31 October 2025 – 17 January 2026)

== 2014 Jewish Film Festival funding ==
In August 2014, the theatre informed the UK Jewish Film Festival (UKJFF) that it could not host the festival in 2014 (as it had done for the previous eight years) if the festival accepted a £1400 grant from the Israeli Embassy in London, as the theatre did not think that the festival should accept funding from any party to the then ongoing conflict in Gaza. The theatre offered to make up the loss itself but the festival's chief executive director Stephen Margolis dismissed this offer as a "publicity stunt", saying that artistic director Indhu Rubasingham had also demanded to scrutinise the list of films to be shown. The decision led to accusations of anti-semitism and The Jewish Chronicle described the decision as "open racism". Rubasingham drew attention to her own and the theatre's record, adding: "I am not anti-Semitic or anti-Israeli".

Nick Cohen, writing in The Spectator, accused the Tricycle of inconsistency, as other groups' or events' funding had not, he claimed, previously been examined in this way. Cohen also pointed out that the theatre accepted Arts Council funding during times that the UK was actively involved in military conflicts. In an editorial, The Guardian said that the theatre had made "a bad error of judgment". Sajid Javid, the Secretary of State for Culture, Media and Sport was reported as saying that the theatre had been "misguided" in demanding the festival drop its sponsorship by the Israeli Embassy.

Theatre directors Nicholas Hytner and Richard Eyre both supported the Tricycle's stance and deplored those who had misrepresented that position. Hytner also said "Rubasingham and the Tricycle board could not have made clearer their commitment to Jewish culture ... It is entirely understandable that they felt obliged to insist that no government agency should sponsor the festival. The Tricycle ... has a clear responsibility to make no statement about the dispute that is behind the current conflict. It greatly saddens me that the UKJFF have unwisely politicised a celebration of Jewish culture".

However, in a joint statement on 15 August, the UKJFF and Tricycle Theatre said: "Some weeks ago the UKJFF fell out, very publicly, with the Tricycle over a condition imposed by the Tricycle regarding funding. This provoked considerable public upset. Both organisations have come together to end that. Following lengthy discussions between the Tricycle and UKJFF, the Tricycle has now withdrawn its objection and invited back the UK Jewish Film Festival on the same terms as in previous years with no restrictions on funding from the Embassy of Israel in London." The 2014 festival did not take place at the theatre, but it was suggested that the Tricycle might hold some UKJFF-related events later in the year.

In May 2015, the Tricycle Theatre's chair, Jonathan Levy, issued an apology in a piece published in The Jewish Chronicle, saying that the theatre had taken the wrong decision when it had asked UKJFF to return to the Israeli Embassy the £1400 funding it had received and that it was now seeking ways to rebuild mutual trust with the Jewish community.

== Facilities ==
- 292-seat theatre
- 291-seat cinema
- The Cameron Mackintosh Rehearsal Studio
- The James Baldwin Studio – for workshops and smaller scale theatre works
- The Paint Box – a visual arts studio endowed by the John S Cohen Foundation
- The August Wilson Creative Space – for education and outreach workshops
- Cafe-bar
