= Ugly Lies the Bone =

2015 play by Lindsey Ferrentino

- Original language: English
- Written by: Lindsey Ferrentino
- Characters: Jess; Kacie; Stevie; Kelvin; Voice; Mom
- Genre: Drama
- Setting: Titusville, the heart of Florida's Space Coast

Premiere
- Date: 10 September 2015
- Place: Roundabout Underground

Ugly Lies the Bone is a 2015 play by Lindsey Ferrentino. The play had a developmental workshop at by the Theatre Program of Fordham University in October 2014, before having its world premiere production by Roundabout Underground, and played at the Black Box Theatre in the Harold and Miriam Steinberg Center for Theatre. It opened on 10 September 2015, playing an extended run to 6 December. In 2017 the Royal National Theatre staged a production in the Lyttelton Theatre in a limited run from 1 March 2017 to 6 June. Directed by Indhu Rubasingham - the cast consisted of Kate Fleetwood as Jess, Olivia Darnley as Kacie, Ralf Little as Stevie, Kris Marshall as Kelvin and Buffy Davis as Voice/Mom.

== Plot ==
Jess returns to her home in the Space Coast area of Florida after three tours of military service in Afghanistan. She tries to confront her traumatic experiences and deal with how life has changed at home.

Using pioneering virtual reality therapy, she builds her own world, by which she is able to start to mend and heal various relationships, and her own life.
