= The Father and the Assassin =

2022 play written by Anupama Chandrasekhar

- Written by: Anupama Chandrasekhar
- Music by: Siddhartha Khosla

Premiere
- Date: 12 May 2022
- Place: National Theatre, London
- Directed by: Indhu Rubasingham

The Father and the Assassin is a play written by Anupama Chandrasekhar. It tells the story of Nathuram Godse, a follower of Gandhi who would go on to shoot him. The play premiered on 12 May 2022 at the National Theatre in London, directed by Indhu Rubasingham.

== Production history ==
Anupama Chandrasekhar began writing The Father and the Assassin in 2016. She developed the first and second drafts as a writer-in-residence National Theatre in London. In November 2021, the National Theatre announced its schedule through summer 2022, including The Father and the Assassin in May on the Olivier stage, starring Shubham Saraf alongside Sagar Arya, Ayesha Dharker, and Peter Singh. Further cast members were announced in February 2022.

In an interview with The Guardian, Chandrasekhar stated "My job is to chronicle the changes that are happening in society", and that as a result of the rise of Hindu nationalism, Godse had "entered political conversations in India". She wanted to stage this play in Britain, as "I didn't realise there was a gap in the British education system about the empire until I came here". Told from Godse's perspective, Chandresekhar felt it was important to "sift through the mythology surrounding these figures... I didn't want any of the characters to be idols", but admitted she had to take creative liberties with parts of Godse's story due to a lack of information. This marked the fourth time Chandrasekhar worked with director Indhu Rubasingham. Rajha Shakiry did the costume and set design, which included a rotating stage, while Oliver Fenwick did the lighting.

In July 2023, it was announced The Father and the Assassin would return to the National Theatre from 8 September to 14 October 2023, with Hiran Abeysekera replacing Shubham Saraf as Godse. Tony Jayawardena, who had played Baba in the original production, would take over the role of Savarkar from Sagar Arya. Other new cast members included Aysha Kala, while the likes of Paul Bazely, Ayesha Dharker, Marc Elliott, and Ravin J Ganatra would reprise their roles.

== Cast and characters ==
Character	National Theatre	
Character	2022	2023
Nathuram Godse	Shubham Saraf	Hiran Abeysekera
Mohandas Gandhi	Paul Bazely	Paul Bazely
Vinayak Savarkar	Sagar Arya	Tony Jayawardena
Aai	Ayesha Dharker	Ayesha Dharker
Pandit Jawaharlal Nehru	Marc Elliott	Marc Elliott
Saradar Vallabhai Patel	Ravin J Ganatra	Ravin J Ganatra
Vimala	Dinita Gohil	Aysha Kala
Mohammad Ali Jinnah	Irvine Iqbal	Nicholas Khan
Narayan Apte	Sid Sagar	Sid Sagar
Baba	Tony Jayawardena	Ravi Aujla
Madhav Kishore	Ankur Bahl	Hari McKinnon
Mithun	Nadeem Islam	Nadeem Islam
Daulat	Peter Singh	Azan Ahmed
Kishen	Maanuv Thiara	Akshay Shah

== Reception ==
=== Critical response ===
Andrzej Lukowski of Time Out London, who gave the play five stars, compared The Father and the Assassin to Peter Shaffer's Amadeus.

=== Awards and nominations ===
Year	Award	Category	Nominee	Result	Ref.
2022	Evening Standard Theatre Awards	Best Play	The Father and the Assassin	Nominated	
2022	Evening Standard Theatre Awards	Best Actor	Shubham Saraf	Nominated	
2023	WhatsOnStage Awards	Best Direction	Indhu Rubasingham	Nominated	
