= Indhu Rubasingham =

British stage director (born 1970)

Indhu Rubasingham MBE
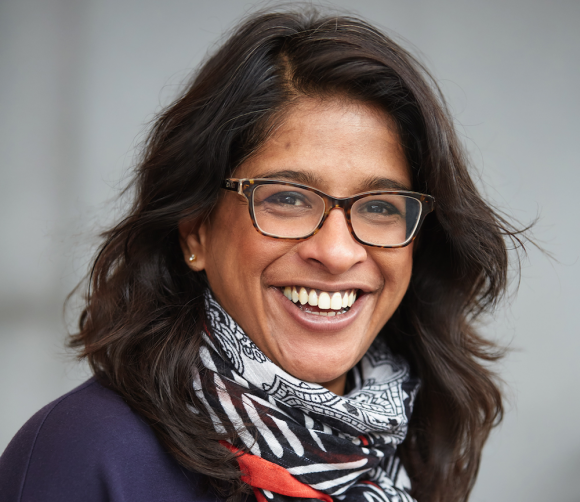
- Born: Sheffield, England
- Education: Hull University
- Occupation: Director
- Known for: Artistic Director of Kiln Theatre

Indhu Rubasingham, MBE (/ˈɪnduː ˌruːbəˈsɪŋəm/; born 1970), is a British theatre director and the current artistic director of the National Theatre.

== Early life and education ==
Born in Sheffield, England, to Tamil parents from Sri Lanka on 18 February 1970, Rubasingham was educated at Nottingham Girls' High School, after which she studied drama at Hull University, from where she later received an honorary doctorate in 2017.

== Career ==
=== Freelance directing ===
Soon after graduating from Hull University, Rubasingham received an Arts Council bursary to work as a trainee director at the Theatre Royal Stratford East, where she assisted director Mike Leigh. She then worked as a freelance theatre director for more than fifteen years and during this time held posts as an associate director at the Gate Theatre, the Young Vic, and the Birmingham Repertory Theatre.

She has worked across the UK and internationally. Her focus has been predominantly directing new writing and developing exciting voices. Themes that often arise in her work explore and examine ideas around British identity and the threads of human connection that crosses race, culture and identity; telling stories from different perspectives and specificity that reveals the universality of the human spirit.

Rubasingham had a long involvement with the international department at the Royal Court Theatre when headed by Elyse Dodgson which allowed her to forge relationships with playwrights from Cuba, Mexico, Brazil, Uganda and India. Indhu has also had a longstanding relationship with Sundance Theatre Lab (2011–2019), under the artistic directorship of Philip Himberg. She has directed radio plays for BBC Radio 4, BBC Radio 3 and the BBC World Service.

She is a trustee for the Royal Opera House, Metroland (Brent), the George Devine Award and the Susan Smith Blackburn Prize. Previous trustee positions include Mountview Academy of Theatre Arts, British Council Advisory Board and the Regional Theatre Young Directors Scheme, for which Rubasingham is currently a patron. She is on the judging panel for the Channel 4 Playwriting Scheme and the Phil Fox Award for Playwriting. Since 2021, she has been on the judging panel of The Women's Prize for Playwriting, becoming Chair in 2023.

In 2017, Rubasingham was appointed MBE in the 2017 New Year Honours List.

=== As artistic director ===
Rubasingham succeeded Nicolas Kent as artistic director of the Tricycle Theatre in 2012. In April 2018, after a capital renovation, the theatre's name was changed to the Kiln Theatre. Rubasingham's mission for Kiln Theatre was to make theatre for all by making space for unheard/ignored voices to be part of the mainstream and be a local theatre with an international vision. The theatre sits in the Borough of Brent.

In August 2014, she was at the centre of an antisemitism controversy over the funding of the UK Jewish Film Festival, intended to have been held at Tricycle. Rubasingham said it was "inappropriate" to host a festival part-funded by the Israeli embassy given "the current conflict in Israel and Gaza". She later claimed she had been subject to "vitriol from some elements of the Jewish community" and "people saying they are going to withdraw money". The theatre eventually reversed the decision and issued a public apology, allowing the festival to go ahead.

Rubasingham oversaw a £9 million major renovation of Tricycle building, which reopened in 2018 as Kiln. The revamped building includes an adaptable stage in the larger 292-seat theatre, better sightlines, new lighting facilities, a new café, improved disabled access and gender-neutral toilets.

Rubasingham's production of Red Velvet by Lolita Chakrabarti was transferred to the West End's Garrick Theatre and St Ann's Warehouse Theater in New York. Her production of Moira Buffini's Handbagged was transferred to the West End's Vaudeville Theatre prior to a UK tour before playing at 59e59 in New York and Washington, D.C.'s Round House Theatre. Her production of Zadie Smith's The Wife of Willesden has transferred to American Repertory Theatre, Harvard University and Brooklyn Academy of Music. Sher programmed Florian Zeller's "Family Trilogy", including The Son, which was transferred to the West End's Duke of York's Theatre in 2019; and The Father, which was transferred to the West End's Wyndham's Theatre in 2015 before being moved to the West End's Duke of York's Theatre in 2016. The Father was adapted for the 2020 film starring Anthony Hopkins and Olivia Colman, directed by Zeller.

It was announced in December 2023 she would take over as Artistic Director of the National Theatre from Rufus Norris. She took up her role in the spring of 2025.

== Works ==
=== Theatre productions ===
Year	Play	Production	Notes
2023	The Wife of Willesden by Zadie Smith	Brooklyn Academy of Music	NY premiere
2023	The Wife of Willesden by Zadie Smith	American Repertory Theater, Harvard University	US premiere
2022	Kerry Jackson by April de Angelis	National Theatre	UK premiere
2022	The Wife of Willesden by Zadie Smith	Kiln Theatre	First major revival
2022	Handbagged by Moira Buffini	Kiln Theatre	First major revival
2022	The Father and the Assassin by Anupama Chandrasekhar	National Theatre	World premiere
2021	The Wife of Willesden by Zadie Smith	Kiln Theatre	World premiere
2021	The Invisible Hand by Ayad Akhtar	Kiln Theatre	First major revival
2021	Girl on an Altar (Rehearsed Reading) by Marina Carr	Kiln Theatre	Live Stream. Co-directed with Susie McKenna
2020	The Invisible Hand (Rehearsed Reading) by Ayad Akhtar	Kiln Theatre	Live Stream
2020	Pass Over by Antoinette Nwandu	Kiln Theatre	UK premiere
2019	When the Crows Visit by Anupama Chandrasekhar	Kiln Theatre	World Premiere
2019	Handbagged by Moira Buffini	59E59 Theaters	New York Premiere, produced by Round House Theatre
2019	Wife by Samuel Adamson	Kiln Theatre	World Premiere
2018	White Teeth by Zadie Smith, adapted by Stephen Sharkey	Kiln Theatre	World Premiere
2018	Holy Sh!t by Alexis Zegerman	Kiln Theatre	World Premiere
2018	The Great Wave by Francis Turnly	National Theatre	World Premiere. A co-production with Kiln Theatre
2017	Ugly Lies the Bone by Lindsey Ferrentino	National Theatre	
2016	The Invisible Hand by Ayad Akhtar	Tricycle Theatre	UK Premiere
2015	A Wolf in Snakeskin Shoes by Marcus Gardley	Tricycle Theatre	
2015	The Motherfucker with the Hat by Stephen Adly Guirgis	National Theatre	Winner of Best Play and nominated for Best Director at Evening Standard Theatre Awards.
2015	Multitudes by John Hollingworth	Tricycle Theatre	
2014	The House That Will Not Stand by Marcus Gardley	Tricycle Theatre	
2013	Handbagged by Moira Buffini	Tricycle Theatre	West End transfer, Vaudeville Theatre, in 2014
2012	Red Velvet by Lolita Chakrabarti	Tricycle Theatre	Winner Outstanding Achievement in an Affiliate Theatre Laurence Olivier Awards. New York transfer, St. Ann's Warehouse, in 2014. UK tour in 2015. West End transfer, Garrick Theatre, in 2016
2012	Belong by Bola Agbaje	Royal Court Theatre	
2011	Stones in His Pockets by Marie Jones	Tricycle Theatre	
2010	Ruined by Lynn Nottage	Almeida Theatre	
2010	Women, Power and Politics by various authors including Moira Buffini and Rebecca Lenkiewicz	Tricycle Theatre	
2010	Disconnect by Anupama Chandrasekhar	Royal Court Theatre	
2009	Detaining Justice by Bola Agbaje	Tricycle Theatre	
2009	The Great Game (with Nicolas Kent )	Tricycle Theatre	Also US Tour, finishing at The Pentagon, Washington.
2008	Wuthering Heights, adapted by April De Angelis from the novel by Emily Brontë	Birmingham Rep	
2007	Free Outgoing by Anupama Chandrasekhar	Traverse Theatre	
2007	Pure Gold by Michael Bhim	Soho Theatre	
2007	Heartbreak House by G.B. Shaw	Watford Palace Theatre	
2007	Free Outgoing by Anupama Chandrasekhar	Royal Court Theatre	
2006	Sugar Mummies by Tanika Gupta	Royal Court Theatre	
2006	Fabulation by Lynn Nottage	Tricycle Theatre	
2005	The Morris by Helen Blakeman	Liverpool Everyman	
2004	Anna in the Tropics by Nilo Cruz	Hampstead Theatre	
2004	Another America a new opera by Errolyn Wallen	Sadler's Wells	
2003	Yellowman by Dael Orlandersmith	Liverpool Everyman and Hampstead Theatre	
2003	Rhinoceros by Ionesco	UCDavis, California	
2002	The Misanthrope by Molière, in an adaptation by Martin Crimp	Minerva Theatre, Chichester	
2002	Bombay Dreams	Apollo Victoria	Associate Director
2002	Romeo and Juliet	Chichester Festival Theatre	
2001	Secret Rapture by David Hare	Minerva Theatre, Chichester	
2001	Clubland by Roy Williams	Royal Court Theatre	
2001	Ramayana	National Theatre	
2000	The Waiting Room by Tanika Gupta	National Theatre	
2000	Ramayana	Birmingham Rep	
1999	Time of Fire by Charles Mulekwa	Birmingham Rep	
1999	Lift Off by Roy Williams	Royal Court Theatre	
1998	The Crutch by Ruwanthie Dechickera	Royal Court Theatre (Upstairs)	
1998	Starstruck by Roy Williams	Tricycle Theatre	Received the John Whiting Award and an EMMAs Award.
1998	Kaahini by Maya Chowdhry	Birmingham Rep	
1997	A River Sutra by Gita Mehta adapted by Tanika Gupta	Three Mills Island Studios	Received Diverse Acts Award from LAB.
1997	Shakuntala by Kalidasa adapted by Peter Oswald	Gate Theatre	
1996	Storming Young Writers Festival	Royal Court Theatre (Upstairs)	
1996	Gulp Fiction by Trish Cooke	Theatre Royal Stratford East	
1996	No Boys' Cricket Club by Roy Williams	Theatre Royal Stratford East	
1996	Sugar Dollies by Klaus Chatten	Gate Theatre	
1996	A Doll's House by Henrik Ibsen	Young Vic Studio	
1994/1995	D'yer Eat With Your Fingers?!	Theatre Royal Stratford East	
1994	Party Girls by Debbie Plentie	Theatre Royal Stratford East	

== Accolades and honours ==
- Best Director, The Father and the Assassin, Eastern Eye Arts, Culture & Theatre Awards (2023)
- Kiln Theatre "Best London Theatre" The Stage Awards (2021)
- Best Director, White Teeth, ACTA – Eastern Eye's Arts Culture & Theatre Awards (2019)
- Tonic Awards (2017)
- Laurence Olivier Award for Outstanding Achievement in an Affiliate Theatre, Handbagged (2014)
- The Arts & Culture Award, Asian Women of Achievement Awards (2012)
- Liberty Human Rights Award (2010)
- The Carlton Multi-Cultural Achievement Award for Performing Arts (2001)
- Achievement in Art and Culture at Asian Achievers Awards (2025)
