= Handbagged =

2010 play by Moira Buffini

Handbagged is a play by the British playwright Moira Buffini, examining the relationship between Elizabeth II of the United Kingdom and Margaret Thatcher, the British prime minister from 1979 to 1990.

== Background ==
Handbagged originated in 2010 as a one-act play, with the younger Thatcher played by Claire Cox, and the elder by Stella Gonet, as part of the Tricycle Theatre's Women, Power and Politics festival. The title derives from the verb coined early in Margaret Thatcher's term to evoke the effects emanating from her personal handbag, as it became an emphatic political prop and visible symbol of her power.

The extended version premiered in October 2013 at the Tricycle.

== West End production ==
In April 2014, the play transferred to the Vaudeville Theatre in London's West End, due to run until August 2014. The cast of this production was:

- Marion Bailey as Q, Older Queen Elizabeth II
- Stella Gonet as T, Older Thatcher
- Neet Mohan as Actor 1 (various parts, including Neil Kinnock and Nancy Reagan)
- Jeff Rawle as Actor 2 (various parts, including Denis Thatcher, Ronald Reagan and Peter Carington, 6th Baron Carrington)
- Lucy Robinson as Liz, Younger Queen
- Fenella Woolgar as Mags, Younger Thatcher
- Katy Brittain as Understudy Q and Liz
- Neil Chinneck as Understudy Actor 1 and Actor 2
- Genevieve Swallow as Understudy T and Mags

The play toured the UK from September to December 2015, starring Susie Blake and Kate Fahy, with the younger Queen portrayed by Emma Handy and younger Thatcher by Sanchia McCormack. It visited Canterbury, Salford, Guildford, Oxford, Coventry, Cambridge, Nottingham, Newcastle-upon-Tyne, Edinburgh, Norwich, Cheltenham, Richmond, Cambridge and Bath.

== 2022 revival ==
The play was revived at the same theatre where it first opened, now renamed the Kiln, running from 11 to 29 October 2022. The cast of this production was:

- Marion Bailey as Q, Older Queen Elizabeth II
- Kate Fahy as T, Older Thatcher
- Romayne Andrews as Actor 1
- Richard Cant as Actor 2
- Abigail Cruttenden as Liz, Younger Queen
- Naomi Frederick as Mags, Younger Thatcher

The director was Indhu Rubasingham, who also directed the 2014 premiere.
