= Anupama Chandrasekhar =

Indian playwright

Anupama Chandrasekhar is an Indian playwright born and based in Chennai. She is known for her play The Father and the Assassin, which earned her a nomination for the Evening Standard Theatre Awards for Best Play and was a finalist for the Susan Smith Blackburn Prize.

== Career ==
Chandrasekhar's plays have been staged at leading venues in India, Europe, Canada, and the US. She was the National Theatre, London's first international playwright-in-residence from 2016 to 2017.

Her play Free Outgoing, directed by Indhu Rubasingham premiered at the Royal Court Theatre in London in 2007. It was revived at the Royal Court's main theatre in Summer 2008 and travelled to the Traverse Theatre for the Edinburgh Fringe Festival the same year.

Chandrasekhar was a runner up for the Evening Standard Theatre Award’s Charles Wintour Prize for Most Promising Playwright in 2008. She was also shortlisted for the John Whiting Award and the Susan Smith Blackburn Prize for Free Outgoing. The play has also been staged by the Nightwood Theatre in Toronto. The play was staged in India by Crea-Shakti and directed by Mahesh Dattani in 2015 and had its American premiere, directed by Snehal Desai and produced by Boom Arts, in Portland, Oregon in 2016.

Her next play, Disconnect, directed by Indhu Rubasingham, also premiered at the Royal Court Theatre. Disconnect has been translated and staged in German and Czech languages and had its American and West Coast premieres in 2013 at Chicago's Victory Gardens Theater and the San Jose Repertory Theatre respectively.

Her play for children, The Snow Queen, an Indian adaptation of the Hans Christian Andersen story, written under commission to the Unicorn Theatre in London, opened for Christmas in December 2011. The play, directed by Rosamunde Hutt, was a tremendous box office success. A remount of the production, produced by the Trestle Theatre, UK, opened the Chennai Metroplus Theatre Festival in 2012 and has toured several cities in India and the UK.

Her subsequent play, When the Crows Visit, inspired by Ibsen's Ghosts and tackling the issue of sexual violence and patriarchy in India, opened at the Kiln Theatre in Autumn 2019. Directed by Indhu Rubasingham, the play was a response to India's horrific 2012 Delhi gang rape and other crimes against women.

In June 2021, the National Theatre announced that it would stage Chandrasekher's new work The Father and the Assassin in its Olivier Theatre in May 2022, a work about the radicalised, devout follower of Gandhi who eventually became his killer.

Her other plays include Acid, originally produced by QTP, Mumbai and later by the Madras Players in 2007 (which she directed), and Closer Apart, produced by Theatre Nisha – Chennai.

Her screenplay adaptation of Free Outgoing was a finalist for the Sundance International Screenwriters’ Lab, Utah. She is the screenplay writer for a short film Kitchen Tales directed by Jane Moriarty and completed in 2020-21.

Her short story Wings of Vedanthangal was the Asia winner of the Commonwealth Short Story Prize in 2006. She won a Charles Wallace Trust of India (CWIT) fellowship to the Royal Court Theatre's International Playwrights Programme in 2000. She was the CWIT Writing Fellow at the University of Chichester in 2015.

== Selected plays ==
1. The Father and the Assassin
2. When the Crows Visit
3. The Snow Queen
4. Disconnect
5. Free Outgoing
6. Acid
