= Evening Standard Theatre Award for Best Play =

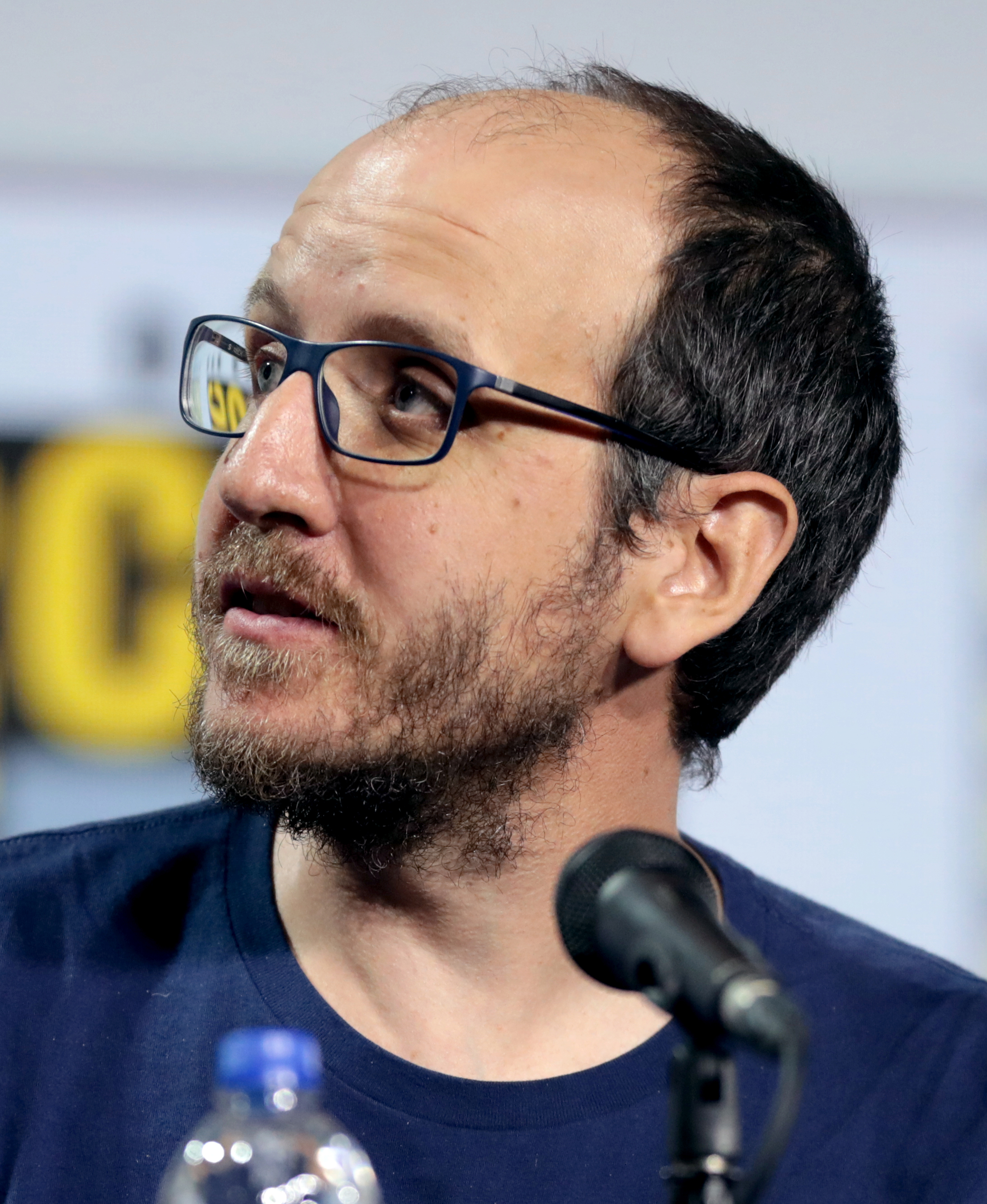
- The 2023 recipient: Jack Thorne
- Awarded for: Best Play
- Location: United Kingdom
- Presented by: Evening Standard
- Currently held by: Jack Thorne for The Motive and the Cue (2023)

The Evening Standard Theatre Award for Best Play is an annual award presented by the Evening Standard since 1955, in recognition of achievement in British theatre.

== Winners and nominees ==
=== 1950s ===
Ceremony	Play	Writer
1st
1st	Tiger at the Gates	Christopher Fry
2nd
2nd	Romanoff and Juliet	Peter Ustinov
3rd
3rd	Summer of the Seventeenth Doll	Ray Lawler
4th
4th	Cat on a Hot Tin Roof	Tennessee Williams
5th
5th	The Long and the Short and the Tall	Willis Hall

=== 1960s ===
Ceremony	Play	Writer
6th
6th	The Caretaker	Harold Pinter
7th
7th	Becket	Jean Anouilh (play) and Lucienne Hill (translation)
8th
8th	The Caucasian Chalk Circle	Bertolt Brecht and Eric Bentley
9th
9th	Poor Bitos	Jean Anouilh (play) and Lucienne Hill (translation)
10th
10th	Who's Afraid of Virginia Woolf?	Edward Albee
11th
11th	The Killing of Sister George	Frank Marcus
11th	A Patriot for Me	John Osborne
12th
12th	Loot	Joe Orton
13th
13th	A Day in the Death of Joe Egg	Peter Nichols
14th
14th	The Hotel in Amsterdam	John Osborne
15th
15th	The National Health	Peter Nichols

=== 1970s ===
Ceremony	Play	Writer
16th
16th	Home	David Storey
17th
17th	Butley	Simon Gray
18th
18th	Jumpers	Tom Stoppard
19th
19th	Saturday, Sunday, Monday	Eduardo De Filippo (play), Keith Waterhouse and Willis Hall (translation)
20th
20th	The Norman Conquests	Alan Ayckbourn
21st
21st	Otherwise Engaged	Simon Gray
22nd
22nd	Weapons of Happiness	Howard Brenton
23rd
23rd	Just Between Ourselves	Alan Ayckbourn
24th
24th	Night and Day	Tom Stoppard
25th
25th	Amadeus	Peter Shaffer

=== 1980s ===
Ceremony	Play	Writer
26th
26th	The Dresser	Ronald Harwood
27th
27th	Passion Play	Peter Nichols
28th
28th	The Real Thing	Tom Stoppard
29th
29th	"Master Harold"...and the Boys	Athol Fugard
30th
30th	Benefactors	Michael Frayn
31st
31st	Pravda	David Hare and Howard Brenton
32nd
32nd	Les Liaisons Dangereuses	Christopher Hampton
33rd
33rd	A Small Family Business	Alan Ayckbourn
34th
34th	Aristocrats	Brian Friel
35th
35th	Ghetto	Joshua Sobol (play) and David Lan (translation)

=== 1990s ===
Ceremony	Play	Writer
36th
36th	Shadowlands	William Nicholson
37th
37th	Dancing at Lughnasa	Brian Friel
38th
38th	Angels in America	Tony Kushner
39th
39th	Arcadia	Tom Stoppard
40th
40th	Three Tall Women	Edward Albee
41st
41st	Pentecost	David Edgar
42nd
42nd	Stanley	Pam Gems
43rd
43rd	The Invention of Love	Tom Stoppard
44th
44th	Copenhagen	Michael Frayn
45th
45th	N/A	

=== 2000s ===
Ceremony	Play	Writer
46th
46th	Blue/Orange	Joe Penhall
47th
47th	The Far Side of the Moon	Robert Lepage
47th	Mouth To Mouth	Kevin Elyot
47th	The Shape Of Things	Neil LaBute
48th
48th	A Number	Caryl Churchill
48th	The Lieutenant Of Inishmore	Martin McDonagh
48th	The York Realist	Peter Gill
49th
49th	Democracy	Michael Frayn
49th	After Mrs Rochester	Polly Teale
49th	Fallout	Roy Williams
50th
50th	The History Boys	Alan Bennett
50th	The Goat, or Who Is Sylvia?	Edward Albee
50th	The Pillowman	Martin McDonagh
51st
51st	The Home Place	Brian Friel
51st	2,000 Years	Mike Leigh
51st	Bloody Sunday	Richard Norton-Taylor
51st	Harvest	Richard Bean
52nd
52nd	Rock 'n' Roll	Tom Stoppard
52nd	Frost/Nixon	Peter Morgan
52nd	The Seafarer	Conor McPherson
53rd
53rd	A Disappearing Number	Complicité and Simon McBurney
53rd	Rafta, Rafta...	Ayub Khan-Din
53rd	The Reporter	Nicholas Wright
54th
54th	The Pitmen Painters	Lee Hall
54th	Black Watch	Gregory Burke
54th	Now or Later	Christopher Shinn
55th
55th	Jerusalem	Jez Butterworth
55th	August: Osage County	Tracy Letts
55th	ENRON	Lucy Prebble
55th	Punk Rock	Simon Stephens

=== 2010s ===
Ceremony	Play	Writer
56th
56th	Clybourne Park	Bruce Norris
56th	Cock	Mike Bartlett
56th	Sucker Punch	Roy Williams
57th
57th	The Heretic	Richard Bean
57th	One Man, Two Guvnors	Richard Bean
57th	Becky Shaw	Gina Gionfriddo
57th	Tribes	Nina Raine
58th
58th	Constellations	Nick Payne
58th	This House	James Graham
58th	Love and Information	Caryl Churchill
59th
59th	Chimerica	Lucy Kirkwood
59th	The Dark Earth and the Light Sky	Nick Dear
59th	The Effect	Lucy Prebble
60th
60th	The James Plays	Rona Munro
60th	Intimate Apparel	Lynn Nottage
60th	King Charles III	Mike Bartlett
60th	The Nether	Jennifer Haley
61st
61st	The Motherfucker with the Hat	Stephen Adly Guirgis
61st	Hangmen	Martin McDonagh
61st	The Father	Florian Zeller (play) and Christopher Hampton (translation)
62nd
62nd	Harry Potter and the Cursed Child	J. K. Rowling, Jack Thorne and John Tiffany
62nd	Father Comes Home From The Wars (Parts 1, 2 and 3)	Suzan-Lori Parks
62nd	The Flick	Annie Baker
63rd
63rd	The Ferryman	Jez Butterworth
63rd	The Children	Lucy Kirkwood
63rd	Ink	James Graham
63rd	Oslo	J. T. Rogers
64th
64th	The Inheritance	Matthew Lopez
64th	Home, I’m Darling	Laura Wade
64th	John	Annie Baker
64th	The Lehman Trilogy	Stefano Massini (play) and Ben Power (translation)
64th	The Writer	Ella Hickson
65th
65th	Sweat	Lynn Nottage
65th	Downstate	Bruce Norris
65th	ear for eye	debbie tucker green
65th	Glass. Kill. Bluebeard. Imp.	Caryl Churchill

=== 2020s ===
Ceremony	Play	Writer
66th
66th	Best of Enemies	James Graham
66th	Indecent	Paula Vogel
66th	Red Pitch	Tyrell Williams
66th	The Father and the Assassin	Anupama Chandrasekhar
66th	The Mirror and the Light	Hilary Mantel and Ben Miles
67th
67th	The Motive and the Cue	Jack Thorne
67th	Dear England	James Graham
67th	A Mirror	Sam Holcroft
67th	Retrograde	Ryan Calais Cameron

== Multiple awards ==
6 awards

- Tom Stoppard

3 awards

- Alan Ayckbourn
- Michael Frayn
- Peter Nichols

2 awards

- Edward Albee
- Howard Brenton
- Jez Butterworth
- Simon Gray
- Willis Hall
- Lucienne Hill
- John Osborne
- Jack Thorne

== See also ==
- Laurence Olivier Award for Best New Play
- Critics' Circle Theatre Award for Best New Play
- Tony Award for Best Play
