= Darragh Hand =

Irish actor

- Born: 25 August 1998 (age 28); London, England
- Education: London College of Music
- Occupation: Actor
- Television: Heartstopper (2024); How to Get to Heaven from Belfast (2026)

Darragh Hand (born 25 August 1998) is an Irish stage and television actor. His television appearances include Heartstopper (2024) and How to Get to Heaven from Belfast (2026). In 2023, he was nominated for an Olivier Award for his stage work.

== Early life and education ==
Darragh Hand was born on 25 August 1998 in Croydon, London, and is of Irish and Jamaican heritage.

He trained at the London College of Music, graduating with a Bachelor of Arts in acting in 2021.

== Career ==
Hand had early television roles in episodes of crime series Grace and Silent Witness. On stage, he appeared as footballer Marcus Rashford in the play Dear England, a fictionalised account of the England football team under Gareth Southgate (Joseph Fiennes).

In April 2022 Hand appeared on stage in For Black Boys Who Have Considered Suicide When the Hue Gets Too Heavy at Royal Court Theatre in London, for which he was nominated at the 2023 Laurence Olivier Awards for best supporting actor. In 2024, Hand could be seen as Michael Holden in television series Heartstopper.

From February 2026, Hand could be seen as Liam, a member of the local Garda, in Netflix comedy drama series How to Get to Heaven from Belfast. From March to June 2026, he has a role as Chevalier Danceny in Christopher Hampton’s adaptation of Pierre Choderlos de Laclos’ novel Les Liaisons Dangereuses at the National Theatre, alongside Lesley Manville and Aidan Turner.

== Filmography ==
Key
†	Denotes upcoming work

=== Television ===
Year	Title	Role	Notes
2023	Silent Witness	Kai	2 episodes
2023	Grace	Leo	1 episode
2024	Heartstopper	Michael Holden	4 episodes
2026	How to Get to Heaven from Belfast	Liam	Main cast

=== Film ===
Year	Title	Role	Notes
2026	Heartstopper Forever	Michael Holden	

=== Selected stage credits ===
Year	Title	Role	Venue	Director	Refs
2021	For Black Boys Who Have Considered Suicide When the Hue Gets Too Heavy	Sable	New Diorama Theatre	Ryan Calais Cameron	
2022	For Black Boys Who Have Considered Suicide When the Hue Gets Too Heavy	Sable	Royal Court Theatre	Ryan Calais Cameron	
2022	Bangers	Clef	Soho Theatre	Chris Sonnex	
2023	For Black Boys Who Have Considered Suicide When the Hue Gets Too Heavy	Sable	Apollo Theatre	Ryan Calais Cameron	
2023	Dear England	Marcus Rashford	Olivier Theatre	Rupert Goold	
2023-2024	Dear England	Marcus Rashford	Prince Edward Theatre	Rupert Goold	
2026	Les Liaisons Dangereuses	Chevalier Danceny	Lyttelton Theatre	Marianne Elliott	

== Awards and nominations ==
Year	Award	Category	Work	Result	Ref.
2022	The Stage Debut Awards	Best Performer in a Play	For Black Boys Who Have Considered Suicide When the Hue Gets Too Heavy (Note: Joint nomination with castmates Mark Akintimehin, Emmanuel Akwafo, Nnabiko Ejimofor, Aruna Jalloh, Kaine Lawrence.)	Won	
2023	Laurence Olivier Awards	Best Actor in a Supporting Role	For Black Boys Who Have Considered Suicide When the Hue Gets Too Heavy	Nominated	
