= Ivanno Jeremiah =

British actor

- Born: Uganda
- Education: BRIT School
- Alma mater: Royal Academy of Dramatic Art
- Occupation: Actor
- Years active: 2011–present

Ivanno Jeremiah is an English actor of Ugandan and Rwandan heritage. He is known for his appearances in Humans (2015-2018) and in the episode Shut Up and Dance (2016) of the anthology series Black Mirror.

== Early life and education ==
Jeremiah was born in Uganda to a Ugandan mother and a Rwandan father. At one month old, he moved with his family to London, where he grew up. Jeremiah grew up with four siblings and was raised in a "working class", single-parent household. He has spoken about being neurodivergent.

As a child, Jeremiah attended weekend classes at a local branch of Stagecoach Performing Arts. Prior to gaining entry to the BRIT School in his late teens, Jeremiah attended a local comprehensive school. He later won a scholarship to study at the Royal Academy of Dramatic Art, graduating with a Bachelor of Arts in Acting in 2010.

== Filmography ==
=== Film ===
Year	Title	Role	Notes
2017	Bees Make Honey	Russell	
2018	London Unplugged	Carlton	
2019	The Flood	Haile	
2023	Ozi: Voice of the Forest	Robert	
2024	Woken	James	

=== Television ===
Year	Title	Role	Notes
2011	Injustice	Liam Johnstone	1 episodes
2011	The Jury	Tahir Takana	5 episodes
2012	The Hollow Crown	Blunt	1 episode - television adaptation of Richard III
2015–2018	Humans	Max	23 episodes
2016	Black Mirror	Moped Man	Episode: "Shut Up and Dance"
2017	Doctor Who	Rafando	Episode: "Extremis"
2018	Natural World	Himself (as narrator)	Series 37, episode 4: "Red Ape: Saving the Orangutan"
2019	Counterpart	Young Juma	1 episode
2019	Cold Feet	Charlie Sinclair	4 episodes
2021	Gold Rush: Our Race to Olympic Glory	Himself (as narrator)	BBC 3-part documentary series
2022	A Discovery of Witches	Christopher Roberts	7 episodes
2023	Lockwood & Co.	Inspector Barnes	All 8 episodes
2024	Halo	Antares	3 episodes
2025	Israel and the Palestinians: The Road to 7th October	Himself (as narrator)	BBC 3-part documentary series
2025	Just Act Normal	Leo	

=== Selected stage credits ===
Year	Title	Role	Venue/Production company	Director	Notes/Refs
2011	truth and reconciliation	Rwandan young man	Royal Court Theatre	debbie tucker green (also writer)	
2012	Julius Caesar	Octavius / Cobbler / Ensemble	Royal Shakespeare Theatre; UK tour and World tour	Gregory Doran	
2014	The Suit	Philomen	Various venues - world tour	Peter Brook (also writer)	
2014	The Nether by Jennifer Haley	Woodnut	Royal Court Theatre	Jeremy Herrin	
2015	The Nether by Jennifer Haley	Woodnut	Duke of York's Theatre	Jeremy Herrin	West End transfer of the original production
2015	Measure for Measure	Claudio	Young Vic	Joe Hill-Gibbins	
2017	The Soldier's Tale	The Soldier	City of London Sinfonia	Janet Suzman	
2018-2019	The Convert by Danai Gurira	Chancellor	Young Vic	Ola Ince	
2021	Constellations by Nick Payne	Roland	Vaudeville Theatre; produced by Donmar Warehouse	Michael Longhurst	
2023	Retrograde by Ryan Calais Cameron	Sidney Poitier	Kiln Theatre	Amit Sharma	
2025	Retrograde by Ryan Calais Cameron	Sidney Poitier	Apollo Theatre	Amit Sharma	West End transfer; produced by Colman Domingo
