= 67th Evening Standard Theatre Awards =

Theatre award ceremony

- Date: 19 November 2023
- Location: Claridge's
- Hosted by: Susan Wokoma

Highlights
- Most wins: Sunset Boulevard (2)
- Most nominations: Guys and Dolls (5)

The 67th Evening Standard Theatre Awards were awarded in recognition of the 2022–2023 London theatre season on 19 November 2023 at a ceremony at Claridge's, London. Nominations were announced on 19 October 2023. The awards were hosted by Ian McKellen alongside Evgeny Lebedev, proprietor of the London Evening Standard, with Susan Wokoma presenting the ceremony.

== Eligibility and nomination process ==
All new productions and performances on the London stage between 14 October 2022 and 13 October 2023 were eligible for consideration.

Once again the judging panel was comprised Baz Bamigboye (Deadline Hollywood), Sarah Crompton (WhatsOnStage and The Observer), the Evening Standard’s chief theatre critic Nick Curtis, freelance critic and playwright Farah Najib, Alice Saville, culture writer for Exeunt, Time Out and Financial Times and Matt Wolf (The New York Times); chaired by the Evening Standard's culture editor Nancy Durrant.

== Ceremony ==
=== Presenters ===
- David Tennant presented the Natasha Richardson Award for Best Actress
- Boy George and Jake Shears presented the Editor's Award to Elton John
- Tom Hiddleston presented the Editor's Award to Ruth Wilson

Other presenters included Sheila Atim, Tuppence Middleton, Layton Williams, Paloma Faith, Omari Douglas, Hayley Atwell, Rebecca Lucy Taylor.

=== Sponsors ===
Sponsors included luxury ready-to-wear brand Mithridate and electric vehicle manufacturer, Polestar.

== Non-competitive awards ==
Special Editor's Awards from the Evening Standard's new Editor-in-Chief, Dylan Jones, were given to Ruth Wilson for her marathon 24-hour show The Second Woman, and to Sir Elton John in recognition of his collaborative approach to musical theatre. The Lebedev Award was presented to Sir Sam Mendes for his dedication and contribution to theatre over four decades.

== Winners and nominees ==
Best Play	Best Musical
The Motive and the Cue by Jack Thorne (National Theatre); Dear England by James Graham (National Theatre); A Mirror by Sam Holcroft (Almeida Theatre); Retrograde by Ryan Calais Cameron (Kiln Theatre)	Guys and Dolls (Bridge Theatre); Standing at the Sky’s Edge (National Theatre); A Strange Loop (Barbican Theatre); Tammy Faye (Almeida Theatre)
Best Actor	Natasha Richardson Award for Best Actress
Andrew Scott, Vanya (Duke of York's Theatre); Paapa Essiedu, The Effect (National Theatre); Mark Gatiss, The Motive and the Cue (National Theatre); Paul Mescal, A Streetcar Named Desire (Almeida Theatre)	Patsy Ferran, A Streetcar Named Desire (Almeida Theatre); Anjana Vasan, A Streetcar Named Desire (Almeida Theatre); Sophie Okonedo, Medea (@sohoplace); Rachael Stirling, Private Lives (Donmar Warehouse)
Best Musical Performance	Milton Shulman Award for Best Director
Nicole Scherzinger, Sunset Boulevard (Savoy Theatre); Kyle Ramar Freeman, A Strange Loop (Barbican Theatre); Charlie Stemp, Crazy For You (Gillian Lynne Theatre); Marisha Wallace, Guys and Dolls (Bridge Theatre)	Jamie Lloyd, Sunset Boulevard (Savoy Theatre); Rebecca Frecknall, A Streetcar Named Desire (Almeida Theatre); Rupert Goold, Dear England (National Theatre); Nicholas Hytner, Guys and Dolls (Bridge Theatre)
Best Design	Charles Wintour Award for Most Promising Playwright
Georgia Lowe, The Good Person of Szechwan (Lyric Hammersmith); Bunny Christie, Guys and Dolls (Bridge Theatre); Robert Jones, Dancing at Lughnasa (National Theatre); Tom Pye, My Neighbour Totoro (Royal Shakespeare Company/Barbican Theatre)	Isley Lynn, The Swell (Orange Tree Theatre); Matilda Feyiṣayọ Ibini, Sleepova (Bush Theatre); Kimber Lee, Untitled F*ck M*ss S**gon Play (Young Vic Theatre); Anoushka Lucas, Elephant (Bush Theatre)
Emerging Talent Award
Tatenda Shamiso, No I.D. (Royal Court); Andrew Richardson, Guys and Dolls (Bridge Theatre); Taylor Russell, The Effect (National Theatre); Jack Wolfe, Next to Normal (Donmar Warehouse)

=== Multiple awards ===
2 awards

- Sunset Boulevard (Savoy Theatre)
- A Streetcar Named Desire (Almeida Theatre)

=== Multiple nominations ===
5 nominations

- Guys and Dolls (Bridge Theatre)

4 nominations

- A Streetcar Named Desire (Almeida Theatre)

2 nominations

- The Motive and the Cue (National Theatre)
- Dear England (National Theatre)
- The Effect (National Theatre)
- A Strange Loop (Barbican Theatre)
- Sunset Boulevard (Savoy Theatre)

== See also ==
- 2023 Laurence Olivier Awards
