= 2009 Evening Standard Theatre Awards =

The 2009 Evening Standard Theatre Awards were announced on 2009. The shortlist was revealed on 2009 and the longlist on 2 November 2009.

== Winners, shortlist and longlist ==
= winner

=== Best Play ===
- Jerusalem by Jez Butterworth (Royal Court)

==== Longlisted ====
- August: Osage County by Tracy Letts (Steppenwolf/National)
- England People Very Nice by Richard Bean (National)
- Enron by Lucy Prebble (Royal Court)
- Our Class by Tadeusz Słobodzianek/Ryan Craig (National)
- Pornography by Simon Stephens (Tricycle)
- Punk Rock by Simon Stephens (Lyric Hammersmith)
- Tusk Tusk by Polly Stenham (Royal Court)
- When The Rain Stops Falling by Andrew Bovell (Almeida)

=== Best Director ===
- Rupert Goold for Enron (Royal Court)

==== Longlisted ====
- Howard Davies for Burnt by the Sun (National)
- Marianne Elliott for All's Well That Ends Well (National)
- Richard Eyre for The Last Cigarette (Trafalgar Studios) and The Observer (National)
- Jeremy Herrin for Tusk Tusk (Royal Court)
- Janice Honeyman for The Tempest (RSC Stratford/Richmond)
- Sean Mathias for Waiting For Godot (Theatre Royal Haymarket)
- Sam Mendes for The Winter's Tale (Old Vic)
- Ian Rickson for Jerusalem (Royal Court)
- Anna D Shapiro for August: Osage County (Steppenwolf/National)

=== Best Actor ===
- Mark Rylance, Jerusalem (Royal Court)

==== Longlisted ====
- Bertie Carvel, The Pride, (Royal Court)
- Michael Feast, Plague Over England (Duchess)
- Henry Goodman, Duet For One (Almeida/Vaudeville)
- David Harewood, The Mountaintop (Theatre 503/Trafalgar Studios)
- Matthew Kelly, Who's Afraid Of Virginia Woolf (Trafalgar Studios) & Troilus And Cressida (Shakespeare's Globe)
- Ian McKellen, Waiting For Godot (Theatre Royal Haymarket)
- Simon Russell Beale, The Winter's Tale (Old Vic)
- Kevin Spacey, Inherit The Wind (Old Vic)
- Ken Stott, A View From The Bridge (Duke of York's)
- David Tennant, Hamlet (RSC Stratford/Novello)
- David Troughton, Enjoy (Gielgud) & Inherit The Wind (Old Vic)
- Samuel West, Enron (Royal Court)

=== Natasha Richardson Award for Best Actress ===
- Rachel Weisz, A Streetcar Named Desire (Donmar Warehouse)

==== Longlisted ====
- Samantha Bond, Arcadia (Duke of York's)
- Deanna Dunagan, August: Osage County (Steppenwolf/ National)
- Penny Downie, Helen (Shakespeare's Globe)
- Rebecca Hall, The Winter's Tale (Old Vic)
- Pauline Malefane, The Mysteries (Garrick)
- Lyndsey Marshal, The Pride (Royal Court)
- Mary Elizabeth Mastrantonio, A View From The Bridge (Duke of York's)
- Amy Morton, August: Osage County (Steppenwolf/ National)
- Juliet Stevenson, Duet For One (Almeida/Vaudeville)
- Michelle Terry, England People Very Nice (National)

=== Ned Sherrin Award for Best Musical ===
- Hello, Dolly! (Open Air, Regent's Park)

==== Longlisted ====
- A Little Night Music (Menier Chocolate Factory/Garrick)
- Been So Long (Young Vic)
- The Mysteries (Garrick)
- Spring Awakening (Lyric Hammersmith/Novello)
- Sunset Boulevard (Comedy)

=== Best Design ===
- Mamoru Iriguchi, Mincemeat (Cardboard Citizens/Cordy House, Shoreditch)

==== Longlisted ====
- Jon Bausor, Kursk (Young Vic)
- Miriam Buether, Judgement Day (Almeida)
- Lez Brotherston, Dancing At Lughnasa (Old Vic)
- Bob Crowley, Phedre (National) & The Power Of Yes (National)
- Rob Howell, The Observer (National)
- Peter McKintosh, Prick Up Your Ears (Comedy)
- Vicki Mortimer, Burnt by The Sun (National)
- Christopher Oram, Hamlet, Madame de Sade, Twelfth Night (Donmar at Wyndham's), A Streetcar Named Desire (Donmar Warehouse)
- Todd Rosenthal, August: Osage County (National)
- Ultz, Jerusalem (Royal Court)

=== Charles Wintour Award for Most Promising Playwright ===
- Alia Bano, Shades (Royal Court)

==== Longlisted ====
- Kieron Barry, Stockwell (Landor & Tricycle)
- Lucy Kirkwood, It Felt Empty When The Heart Went At First But It Is Alright Now (Arcola)
- Molly Davies, A Miracle (Royal Court)
- Katori Hall, The Mountaintop (Theatre 503 & Trafalgar Studios)
- Ella Hickson, Eight (Trafalgar Studios)
- Alexi Kaye Campbell, The Pride (Royal Court) & Apologia (Bush)

=== Milton Shulman Award for Outstanding Newcomer ===
- Lenny Henry, Othello (Northern Broadsides at Trafalgar Studios)

==== Longlisted ====
- Naana Agyei-Ampadu, Been So Long (Young Vic)
- Aneurin Barnard, Spring Awakening (Lyric Hammersmith)
- Ruth Negga, Phedre (National)
- Bel Powley, Tusk Tusk (Royal Court)
- Toby Regbo, Tusk Tusk (Royal Court)
- Tom Sturridge, Punk Rock (Lyric Hammersmith)
- Charlotte Wakefield, Spring Awakening (Lyric Hammersmith & Novello)
- Phoebe Waller-Bridge, 2nd May 1997 (Bush)

== Judges ==
- Henry Hitchings of the Standard
- Susannah Clapp of The Observer
- Matt Wolf of the International Herald Tribune
- Georgina Brown of The Mail on Sunday
- Charles Spencer from the Daily Telegraph
- Sarah Sands, London Evening Standard
- Evgeny Lebedev, London Evening Standard
