= Police Cops: The Musical =

Police Cops: The Musical is a comedy musical written by Zachary Hunt, Nathan Parkinson and Tom Roe, with music by Ben Adams. It was developed by Hunt, Parkinson and Roe, out of sketches they created while they were classmates at East 15 drama school. The show is a spoof of Hollywood action movies of the 1980s, and makes abundant use of dance numbers, physical comedy, sight gags, and audience participation.

In 2015, Police Cops received a five-star review from The Stage while playing at the Edinburgh Fringe Festival. It steadily picked up a popular following, and has returned to Edinburgh several times. It has also toured extensively in the UK as well as abroad. The show played in London at the New Diorama Theatre in 2021, and at the Southwark Playhouse first in 2023 and then again in 2024, to critical acclaim and sell-out crowds.

The cast includes the show's creators Hunt, Parkinson and Roe, as well as Melinda Orengo and Natassia Bustamante, who play a variety of female roles. Mychele Lebrun and Ben Lancaster complete the cast as offstage understudies.
