= Tatenda Shamiso =

American theatre director (born 1999)

- Born: November 1999 (age 26); California, USA
- Education: Goldsmiths, University of London
- Occupations: Theatre director, performer, and writer
- Writing career
- Genre: Drama
- Notable work: No I.D. (2023)
- Notable awards: Standard Theatre Award for Emerging Talent (2023)
- Website: www.tatendashamiso.com

Tatendo Shamiso (born November 1999) is an American theatre performer, director, and writer based in London, England. He was the winner of the 2023 Standard Theatre Award for Emerging Talent as writer and performer of the one-man play No I.D., staged at the Royal Court Theatre, which was inspired by his personal experience as a transgender man.

== Early life and education ==
Shamiso was born in California in the United States to a Zimbabwean mother and a Belgian father. He attended a Catholic school during his childhood.

Shamiso moved to Switzerland and eventually to London in the United Kingdom to study for a BA in Acting and Performance Making at Goldsmiths, University of London.

== Career ==
Shamiso has directed and co-directed theatre productions at the Bristol Old Vic and a number of Off West End venues, such as Theatre Royal Stratford East, Shoreditch Town Hall, and Soho Theatre. His first major credit was as an assistant director to Rebecca Frecknall in her production of A Streetcar Named Desire at the Almeida Theatre in 2022-23. In 2023, he was an assistant director in the UK premiere of Robert O'Hara's Bootycandy at Gate Theatre, London. Shamiso also stepped in as a cover cast member in this production and his performance was commended in The Telegraph, which gave the production an overall five star review. In 2024, he was an associate director in the West End transfer of Ryan Calais Cameron's For Black Boys Who Have Considered Suicide When the Hue Gets Too Heavy at Garrick Theatre.

As a writer, his breakout work was the play No I.D., in which he was also the solo performer. It was performed at Theatre Peckham as part of the Peckham Fringe Festival and the Young, Gifted and Black season in 2022, before being picked up by Royal Court Theatre the following year. The production received four out of five star reviews from The Guardian and WhatsOnStage as well as five stars from Time Out London.

== Recognition ==
Shamiso was the winner of the 2023 Standard Theatre Award for Emerging Talent. He was also named as one of London's unsung LGBTQ+ heroes by The Standard in 2024.

== Works ==
| Year | Title | Venue(s)/Production | Roles | | | Note/Refs |
| Year | Title | Venue(s)/Production | Director | Writer | Performer | Note/Refs |
|---|---|---|---|---|---|---|
| 2021–2023 | Sundown Kiki and Sundown Kiki: Reloaded, by Jay Jay Revlon | Young Vic | No | No | Yes | |
| 2022 | Housewarming | Theatre Peckham | Primary director | Yes | No | |
| 2022–2023 | No I.D. | Theatre Peckham (2022); Royal Court Theatre (2023) | No | Yes | Yes | |
| 2022–2023 | A Streetcar Named Desire | Almeida Theatre | Assistant director | No | No | |
| 2023 | Bootycandy, by Robert O'Hara | Gate Theatre, London | Assistant director | No | Cover cast member | |
| 2023 | The Village | Almeida Theatre | No | Co-writer | No | Performed by Almeida Young Company (14-18) |
| 2023–2026 | Choir Boy, by Tarell Alvin McCraney | Bristol Old Vic (2023) and Theatre Royal Stratford East (2026) | Associate director | No | No | Co-directed with Nancy Medina |
| 2024 | For Black Boys Who Have Considered Suicide When the Hue Gets Too Heavy | Garrick Theatre | Associate director | No | No | |
| 2024–2025 | 1884, by Rhianna Ilube | Shoreditch Town Hall (2024) and UK tour (2024-25) | Primary director | No | No | |
| 2025 | A Good House, by Amy Jephta | Royal Court Theatre and Bristol Old Vic | Associate director | No | No | Co-directed with Nancy Medina |
| 2025 | I thought this would feel good, by Travis Alabanza | Charleston Festival | Primary director | No | No | Starring Dylan Mulvaney |
| 2025–2026 | Eat The Rich (but maybe not me mates x), by Jade Franks | Pleasance Theatre (Edinburgh Fringe, 2025); UK Tour (Soho Theatre, Liverpool Everyman, and Bristol Old Vic; 2026) | Primary director | No | No | |

=== Published playtext ===
- Falase, Abi; Shamiso, Tatenda (2023). The Village (1st ed.). London: Nick Hern Books. ISBN 9781788507356.
