= Jack Gordon (actor) =

English actor

- Born: John Gordon; 27 June 1985 (age 41); Bedfordshire, England
- Education: Royal Academy of Dramatic Art (RADA)
- Occupation: Actor
- Years active: 2006–present

John Gordon (born 27 June 1985) is an English actor. He is best known for roles such as Sean in Elaine Constantine's Northern Soul, Ronnie Biggs in the BBC One TV-series The Great Train Robbery and Peter Foley in The Crimson Field. On the stage, he gained acclaim for his role as "Man" in Philip Ridley's Tender Napalm and Giovanni in Cheek by Jowl's 'Tis Pity She's a Whore.

== Early life ==
Jack Gordon was born on 27 June 1985 in Bedfordshire, England. After graduating from Bedford College, he became a member of the National Youth Theatre. At seventeen, he was accepted at the Royal Academy of Dramatic Art and graduated with a BA in Dramatic Arts in 2007. During his final year, he signed with talent agency Hamilton Hodell.

== Career ==
Following RADA, he starred as Romeo in Shakespeare's Romeo and Juliet at the Battersea Arts Centre in London. On stage, he played Billy in West End show Warhorse at the National Theatre in 2010. In 2011, he resumed work with Phillip Ridley, who cast him to star as 'Man' in his play, Tender Napalm. The following year, he starred as Giovanni in 'Tis Pity She's A Whore, a Cheek by Jowl production that would go on to tour the world.

In film, he would go on to play roles such as Jamie in Andrea Arnold's Fish Tank, Jeeko in Phillip Ridley’s Heartless, Lieutenant Burridge in Julian Jarrold’s A Royal Night Out and GI Stanley in Captain America; The First Avenger. In 2014, he was cast as the rowdy Northern Soul dancer, Sean in Elaine Constantine’s Northern Soul, and starred as Max in Love Me Do opposite Rebecca Calder in 2015.

His television work includes the award-winning The Great Train Robbery, directed by Julian Jarrold, where he played the role of notorious thief, Ronnie Biggs, as well as various projects on the BBC, including The Crimson Field where he played Orderly Corporal Peter Foley, as well EastEnders, Primeval, and The Bill.

In 2017, he starred as Russell in Anthony Woodley's refugee-drama, The Flood, starring Lena Headey.

== Filmography ==
=== Film ===
Year	Title	Role	Notes
2009	Fish Tank	Jamie	
2009	Wrong Turn 3: Left for Dead	Trey	Direct-to-video
2009	Heartless	Jeeko	
2010	It's a Wonderful Afterlife	Ari Goldman	
2011	The Devil's Business	Cully	
2011	Captain America: The First Avenger	GI Stanley	
2011	Panic Button	Max	
2012	Life Just Is	Pete	
2012	Truth or Dare	Chris	Also known in the United States as Truth or Die
2014	Northern Soul	Sean	
2015	Love Me Do	Max	
2015	A Royal Night Out	Lieutenant Burridge	
2015	The Carrier	Craig Turnpike	
2016	Bachelor Games	Henry	
2017	Phantom Thread	Rowdy Boy	
2019	The Flood	Russell	

=== Television ===
Year	Title	Role	Notes
2008	Lewis series 2	James Coupland	1 episode
2009	Primeval series 3	Tony	2 episodes
2009	The Bill	Art Minshull	Main role, 1 episode
2008–2009	EastEnders	Paul	Main role, 9 episodes
2012	Law and Order	Mickey	Main role, 1 episode
2013	The Great Train Robbery	Ronnie Biggs	Main role, 2 episodes
2014	The Crimson Field	Peter Foley	Main role, 6 episodes
2016	New Blood	Elias Wesley	Lead role, 2 episodes

=== Stage ===
Year	Title	Role	Theatre/Production
2007	Romeo and Juliet	Romeo	Battersea Arts Centre
2007	The Car Cemetery	Tiossido	Gate Theatre London
2008	The Miracle	Header	National Theatre
2009	DNA	John Tate	National Theatre
2010	War Horse	Billy	National Theatre/West End
2010	Lulu	Alwa	Gate Theatre
2011	Tender Napalm	Man	Southwark Playhouse/Supporting Wall
2012	'Tis Pity She's a Whore	Giovanni	Cheek By Jowl/Barbican/World Tour
2015	Ant Street	Mani	Arcola Theatre
2016	Cosmic Fear (or the day Brad Pitt Got Paranoia)	C	Bedlam Theatre, Edinburgh Fringe Festival
2018	Screaming Secrets	Antonio	Tristan Bathes Theatre
2018	Henry V	Henry	Corsini Gardens, Florence, The New Generation Festival

=== Short film ===
Year	Title	Role	Production
2008	Underneath	Lee	NFTS
2009	Friends Forever	Bully	NFTS
2013	The Body	Jack	Ten Cent Adventures
2014	KIVITOQ	Rene	Fischer Film
2015	The Baby Shower	Actor	Facade Films/Melocoton Films
2017	Faithless	George	Kinetic Films
2018	51 States	M	Independent

=== Video games ===
Year	Title	Role	Ref.
2010	The Curfew	Travis	
