= Laura Horton (writer) =

Laura Horton is a writer, playwright and performer, and was Plymouth's Laureate of Words 2021–23, the first woman to receive this title.

== Early life ==
Horton grew up in Plymouth. Horton graduated with a Bachelor of Arts (BA) in English from Cardiff University in 2006.

== Career ==
Horton's one-woman play Breathless premiered at the Pleasance Courtyard at the Edinburgh Fringe Festival in August 2022. It won a Scotsman Fringe First award and was shortlisted for the Mental Health Foundation Fringe Award, before a run at the Soho Theatre. Her play Lynn Faces played at New Diorama Theatre London and Summerhall Edinburgh Fringe 2024, before embarking on a UK tour in 2025. Horton was recognised in The Stage 100 in 2021 by The Stage newspaper.
