= Northern Soul (film) =

- UK theatrical poster
- Directed by: Elaine Constantine
- Written by: Elaine Constantine
- Produced by: Debbie Gray
- Starring: Elliot James Langridge; Joshua Whitehouse; Antonia Thomas; Jack Gordon; James Lance; Christian McKay; Ricky Tomlinson; Lisa Stansfield; Steve Coogan
- Cinematography: Simon Tindall
- Edited by: Stephen Haren
- Production companies: Stubborn Heart Films; Baby Cow Productions
- Distributed by: Universal Pictures
- Release date: 17 October 2014
- Running time: 99 minutes
- Country: United Kingdom
- Language: English
- Box office: $1.1 million

Northern Soul is a 2014 British historical film directed by Elaine Constantine. It tells the story of two young Lancashire teenagers, Matt and John, whose lives are changed forever by the discovery of African-American soul music and the dance culture that grew up around it in Britain. The film was selected to be shown in the City to City section of the 2015 Toronto Film Festival.

== Plot ==
Set in Lancashire in 1974, the film follows Matt and John as they leave behind a humdrum life of youth clubs and factory lines to chase a dream of travelling to the US, unearthing unknown soul 45s and establishing themselves as top DJ's on the Northern soul music scene. Their dance and amphetamine fuelled quest brings them into contact with some of the darker elements of the scene and tests their friendship to its limits.

== Cast ==
- Josh Whitehouse as Matt
- Elliot James Langridge as John Clark
- Antonia Thomas as Angela
- Steve Coogan as Mr Banks
- James Lance as Ray Henderson
- Ashley Taylor Dawson as Paul, Matt's brother
- Christian McKay as Dad
- Lisa Stansfield as Mum
- Jack Gordon as Sean
- Ricky Tomlinson as Grandad
- John Thomson as Terry youth club DJ
- Claire Garvey as Betty
- Jo Hartley as Jo Sherbert

== Distribution ==
The film was a 15-year labour of love for writer/director Elaine Constantine. Turned down by all the major funding bodies, key festivals and institutional production partners in the UK, the film was eventually funded through a mix of private investors and Constantine's substantial personal investment. The film was eventually picked up for distribution by Universal Pictures who sub-licensed the theatrical release to Munro Film Services. Despite only being given a three-day theatrical window and a limited marketing campaign, the film went on to become the widest short-window release to date in the UK according to its producers. Initially expected to open on six to fourteen screens nationally, the film opened on 89 screens on its opening night and 120 screens across its opening weekend. With 97/98 % seat occupancy across 235 individual screenings these were enough to propel the film into the box office top 10 for its opening weekend.

The soundtrack from the film reached no. 7 in the UK Compilation Chart. On 2 December the movie was released on Netflix in the United States.

== Reception ==
The film was positively received by both the public and critics. On publication of early projections for the number of independent screens due to take the film, social media groups sprang up campaigning for the film to come to their local cinema. This grass roots pressure on local indie screens, which included 23 Ourscreen bookings; the committed efforts of Munro Film Services and a growing media interest in the film's progress saw distribution snowball to the levels above. The film went on to screen in nearly 300 separate cinemas and other venues in the UK.

On Rotten Tomatoes, the film has an approval rating of 76% based on reviews from 38 critics. The site's consensus is, "Northern Soul overcomes its spotty narrative with a likable cast, rich period atmosphere, and a killer soundtrack that perfectly captures the time." On Metacritic it has a score 64% based on reviews from 14 critics, indicating "generally favorable reviews". Mark Kermode of The Guardian was one of several critics who gave the film four stars, saying, "Constantine catches the energy of the dancehall with aplomb, transporting her audiences from the empty floors of dour neighbourhood youth clubs to the throng of the Wigan Casino with urgent ease. Steve Coogan and Ricky Tomlinson add sly cameo support. Definitely worth a spin".

== Accolades ==
- 2015 BAFTA Outstanding Debut for a Writer, Director or Producer Award - Nominated.
- 2015 NME Best film of 2014 - WINNER
- 2015 London Critics Circle Breakthrough British Filmmaker Award — Nominated.

Northern Soul won the NME Best Film Award 2015 on 18 February 2015. The award was voted for by the general public, confirming the popularity of the film. The film was up against Boyhood, Frank, Get On Up, God Help The Girl, and The Inbetweeners 2.
