= Karen Bryson =

British actress and film director

- Education: London Academy of Music and Dramatic Art
- Occupations: Actress and Film director

Karen Bryson is a British actress and film director best known for her role as Avril Powell in the comedy drama series Shameless. Since her television debut in 1996, she has appeared in several BAFTA-award winning series, including Buried (2003), Canterbury Tales (2003), The Bill and Holby City. She has also appeared in Black Narcissus (2020) and The Split (2022). She had an uncredited role as Elinore Stone in the 2021 American superhero film Zack Snyder's Justice League. Bryson made her directorial debut in 2022 with the short film Monochromatic. As a theatre actress, she has performed with the Royal Shakespeare Company in productions including The Winter's Tale and The Comedy of Errors. She has voiced various characters in several video games, including Baldur's Gate 3 and 007 First Light.

She was honoured with an MBE by Queen Elizabeth II in June 2017 for her contributions in the field of drama, which was awarded to her by Prince Charles. She is an ambassador for the charity Solace Women's Aid.

== Biography ==
Her family moved from Barbados to England after her father joined the British Army. Bryson practised dancing in her youth. She studied at the London Academy of Music and Dramatic Art.

== Filmography ==
Film performances
Year	Title	Role	Notes
1998	Middleton's Changeling	Asylum inmate	
2000	Maybe Baby	Actor playing doctor	
2001	Zulu 9	Woman	Short film
2014	Family Reunion	Karen	Short film
2015	The Carrier	Maria Adams	
2016	Time Is Forever	Dr. White	Short film
2017	Just Charlie	Claire Robson	
2017	Zack Snyder's Justice League	Elinore Stone	Uncredited
2018	The Intent 2: The Come Up	Sergeant Walker	
2019	Real	Bola	

Television performances
Year	Title	Role	Notes
1996	Frontiers		Episode: "Casual Bank Robbers"
1997	The Longest Memory	Cook	Television film
1999	The Winter's Tale	Maid	Television film
1999	The Bill	Tania	Episode: "Just Looking"
2001	Holby City	Police officer	Episode: "Men Are From Mars"
2002	Lenny Blue	Girlfriend	
2003	Buried	Cleo Kingly	2 episodes
2003	Canterbury Tales	Oonagh	Episode: "The Knight's Tale"
2003	Between the Sheets	Catherine Walton	6 episodes
2004	The Bill	Asha Richards^{‡}	3 episodes
2004–2005	Bodies	Hazel Melrose	Supporting role
2005	Doctors	Jackie Grant	Episode: "Fifty-Fifty"
2006	Holby City	Helen Logan^{‡}	Episode: "Honesty"
2006	New Street Law	Dr. McFarlane	1 episode
2007	Waking the Dead	Dr. Claudia Vincent	Episode: "Mask of Sanity: Part 1"
2007	Waterloo Road	Francine	1 episode
2007	Coming Down the Mountain	London teacher	Television film
2007	Torn	Debbie Weaver	2 episodes
2007	Sold	Angela Tudor	1 episode
2007	Lead Balloon	Ally	Episode: "Rita"
2007	Doctors	Ana Achebe^{‡}	Episode: "Red, White & Blue"
2008	Changing Climates, Changing Times	Idri's mother	Television film
2008	The Children	PC Yearsley	2 episodes
2008	Apparitions	Zoe Dayton	1 episode
2008	Shameless	Doctor	Episode: "The Countdown"
2008	Silent Witness	DI Helen Okoroafor	2 episodes
2009	10 Minute Tales	Second midwife	Episode: "Ding Dong"
2011–2013	Shameless	Avril Powell^{‡}	Recurring role
2013	Casualty	Karen Baines	Episode: "A History of Violence"
2015	Ordinary Lies	Sally	Episode: "Kathy's Story"
2015	Doctors	Karina Seagrove^{‡}	Episode: "Corked"
2015	Cuffs	Custody Sgt. Melanie Pyke	Supporting role
2016	Happy Valley	Dr. Carol Fowler	1 episode
2017	The Child in Time	Mrs. Matterson	Television film
2017	Red Light	Susan	Television miniseries
2018	Safe	Helen Crowthorne	Supporting role
2018	The Block	Marion	Television film
2019	MotherFatherSon	Kali Elgood	4 episodes
2020	Vera	Louise Wilmott	Episode: "The Escape Turn"
2020	Bulletproof	Vanessa Daniels	3 episodes
2020	White Wall	Gina	Supporting role
2020	Black Narcissus	Sister Philippa	2 episodes
2021	Death in Paradise	Gardenia Dujon	1 episode
2021	Silent Witness	Dr. Emily Braithwaite^{‡}	2 episodes
2022	The Teacher	Ava	1 episode
2022	The Split	Leonora Hale	6 episodes
2024	The Madame Blanc Mysteries	Lucia	Episode: "Fashion"
2025	The Rainmaker	Dot Black	Supporting role
2026	Patience	Jane Wallace	Episode: "Hostage"
"‡" denotes a subsequent appearance in the same series as a different character

Video game performances
Year	Title	Role
2018	World of Warcraft: Battle for Azeroth	
2021	Last Stop	Tamara Adeleke
2023	Baldur's Gate 3	Various characters
2026	007 First Light	
2026	The Quiet Things	Pamela Hughes

== Awards and nominations ==
Year	Award ceremony	Category	Nominated work	Result	Ref.
2013	Movie Video & Screen Awards	Best Comedy Performance	Shameless	Nominated	
2013	Movie Video & Screen Awards	Best Actress	Shameless	Nominated	
2013	Screen Nation Awards	Best Actress in TV	—N/a	Won	
2023	City of Angels Film Festival	Most Innovative Film	Monochromatic	Won	
2023	225 Film Club Audience Award	Best Film	Monochromatic	Nominated	
2024	Kino London Short Film Festival	Best First Time Filmmaker	Monochromatic	Won	
