= Birmingham Youth Theatre =

Theatre in the UK

Coordinates: 52.4527°N 1.9037°W

The Birmingham Youth Theatre was founded in 1971 in Birmingham, England by local teachers Derek Nicholls and Ray Speakman, and was based at the Midlands Arts Centre and Birmingham Repertory Theatre. From 1984 it was also run by teacher and director Malcolm Cleland, who also ran the Central Junior Television Workshop in Birmingham.

The company was funded by Birmingham City Council and West Midlands Arts for the purpose of giving 16- to 23-year-olds from the wider local community access to drama and the theatre arts. Many successful actors and actresses began their careers in the youth theatre, most notably:

- Andrew Tiernan
- Adrian Lester
- Lorna Laidlaw, Doctors (2000 TV series)
- Joe Dixon (actor)

As of 2009, Derek Nicholls is now the chief executive of Qdos Entertainment plc's HQ Theatres division.

Due to problems with funding, the company ceased to exist in 1987. The unrelated BMOS Youtheatre was set up in Birmingham in 1987, and renamed "Birmingham Youth Theatre" in 2013; it is a registered charity.
