= 2008 Evening Standard Theatre Awards =

Theatre award in the United Kingdom

The Evening Standard Theatre Awards were announced on November 24, 2008. The longlist was revealed on November 4, 2008 and the shortlist on November 7, 2008.

== Winners, shortlist and longlist ==
= winner

=== Best Play ===
==== Shortlisted ====
- Black Watch by Gregory Burke (National Theatre of Scotland at the Barbican Theatre)
- Now Or Later by Christopher Shinn (Royal Court Jerwood Theatre Downstairs)
- The Pitmen Painters by Lee Hall (Live Theatre and National Theatre co-production)

==== Longlisted ====
- Black Watch by Gregory Burke (National Theatre of Scotland at the Barbican Theatre)
- Days Of Significance by Roy Williams (Royal Shakespeare Company at the Tricycle Theatre)
- Her Naked Skin by Rebecca Lenkiewicz (National Theatre Olivier)
- Never So Good by Howard Brenton (National Theatre Lyttelton)
- Now Or Later by Christopher Shinn (Royal Court Jerwood Theatre Downstairs)
- The Pitmen Painters by Lee Hall (Live Theatre and National Theatre co-production)

=== Sydney Edwards Award for Best Director ===
==== Shortlisted ====
- Michael Boyd for The History Cycle (Royal Shakespeare Company at the Roundhouse)
- Michael Grandage for Othello (Donmar Warehouse), The Chalk Garden (Donmar Warehouse), Ivanov (Donmar West End at the Wyndham's Theatre)
- John Tiffany for Black Watch (National Theatre of Scotland at the Barbican Theatre)

==== Longlisted ====
- Lucy Bailey for Timon Of Athens (Shakespeare's Globe)
- Michael Boyd for The History Cycle (Royal Shakespeare Company at the Roundhouse)
- Rupert Goold for Six Characters In Search Of An Author (Gielgud Theatre), No Man's Land (Duke of York's Theatre), The Last Days of Judas Iscariot (Almeida Theatre)
- Michael Grandage for Othello (Donmar Warehouse), The Chalk Garden (Donmar Warehouse), Ivanov (Donmar West End at the Wyndham's Theatre)
- Katie Mitchell for The Trojan Women (National Theatre Lyttelton)
- Emma Rice for Brief Encounter (Kneehigh at the Cinema Haymarket)
- Alan Rickman for Creditors (Donmar Warehouse)
- John Tiffany for Black Watch (National Theatre of Scotland at the Barbican Theatre)

=== Best Actor ===
==== Shortlisted ====
- Kenneth Branagh, Ivanov (Donmar West End at the Wyndham's Theatre)
- David Calder, King Lear (Shakespeare's Globe)
- Chiwetel Ejiofor, Othello (Donmar Warehouse)

==== Longlisted ====
- Kenneth Branagh, Ivanov (Donmar West End at the Wyndham's Theatre)
- David Calder, King Lear (Shakespeare's Globe)
- Adam Godley, Rain Man (Apollo Theatre)
- Chiwetel Ejiofor, Othello (Donmar Warehouse)
- Will Keen, Waste (Almeida Theatre)
- Simon Russell Beale, Much Ado About Nothing (National Theatre Olivier)
- Jonathan Slinger, Richard II/Richard III (Royal Shakespeare Company at the Roundhouse)
- Kevin Spacey, Speed-The-Plow (Old Vic)

=== Best Actress ===
==== Shortlisted ====
- Lesley Manville, Her Naked Skin (National Theatre Olivier)
- Margaret Tyzack, The Chalk Garden (Donmar Warehouse)
- Penelope Wilton, The Chalk Garden (Donmar Warehouse)

==== Longlisted ====
- Lesley Manville, Her Naked Skin (National Theatre Olivier)
- Helen McCrory, Rosmersholm (Almeida Theatre)
- Phoebe Nicholls, Waste (Almeida Theatre)
- Lesley Sharp, Harper Regan (National Theatre Cottesloe)
- Margaret Tyzack, The Chalk Garden (Donmar Warehouse)
- Penelope Wilton, The Chalk Garden (Donmar Warehouse)

=== Ned Sherrin Award for Best Musical ===
==== Shortlisted ====
- La Cage Aux Folles, Menier Chocolate Factory and Playhouse Theatre
- Marguerite, Theatre Royal Haymarket
- Street Scene, The Opera Group, Young Vic and Watford Palace Theatre co-production

==== Longlisted ====
- La Cage Aux Folles, Menier Chocolate Factory and Playhouse Theatre
- Eurobeat, Novello Theatre
- Jersey Boys, Prince Edward Theatre
- Marguerite, Theatre Royal Haymarket
- Street Scene, The Opera Group, Young Vic and Watford Palace Theatre co-production

=== Charles Wintour Award for Most Promising Playwright ===
==== Shortlisted ====
- Tarell Alvin McCraney, Brothers Size and In the Red and Brown Water
- Anupama Chandrasekhar, Free Outgoing (Royal Court)- Runner up
- Bola Agbaje, Gone Too Far! (Royal Court) - Runner up
