= Standard Theatre Awards =

Annual awards ceremony for theatrical achievements

- Standard Theatre Award statuette
- Awarded for: Outstanding achievement in London theatre
- Location: London
- Country: United Kingdom
- Presented by: The Standard
- First award: 1955; 71 years ago
- Website: https://www.standard.co.uk/topic/evening-standard-theatre-awards

The Standard Theatre Awards, formerly the Evening Standard Theatre Awards, were established in 1955 and are the oldest theatrical awards in the United Kingdom. Awarded by The Standard newspaper, the awards recognise outstanding achievement in London theatre and are equivalent to New York's Drama Desk Awards.

== Statuette ==
The trophies take the form of a modelled statuette, a figure representing Drama, designed by Frank Dobson RA, a former Professor of Sculpture at the Royal College of Art.

== History ==
The 2007 Awards lunchtime ceremony took place at the Savoy Hotel in London on 27 November 2007. The judges' assessments of the winners are online. The 2008 winners were announced in a ceremony at the Royal Opera House, Covent Garden, on 24 November 2008. The judges' assessments are online. The 2009 winners were announced in a ceremony, again at the Royal Opera House, on Monday, 23 November 2009. The judges' assessments are online. The 2010 winners were announced at a celebratory evening ceremony on Thursday 28 November 2010 in the newly refurbished Savoy Hotel.

The 2011 winners were announced in a ceremony at the Savoy Hotel on 20 November 2011. The 2012 winners were announced in a ceremony again at the Savoy Hotel on 25 November 2012. The 2013 winners were announced in a ceremony again at the Savoy Hotel on 17 November 2013. The 2014 winners were announced in a ceremony at the London Palladium on 30 November 2014. The 2015 winners were announced in a ceremony at the Old Vic Theatre on 22 November 2015. The 2016 winners were announced in a ceremony again at the Old Vic Theatre on 13 November 2016. The 2017 winners were announced in a ceremony at the Theatre Royal Drury Lane on 3 December 2017. The 2018 winners were announced in a ceremony again at the Theatre Royal Drury Lane on 18 November 2018. The 2019 winners were announced in a ceremony at the London Coliseum on 24 November 2019. The 2022 winners were announced in a ceremony at The Ivy on 11 December 2022. The 2023 winners were announced in a ceremony at Claridge's Hotel on 19 November 2023.

== Awards by year ==
List of existing articles for individual years: (Note: After the 65th Awards, presented in November 2019, the complete shutdown of UK theatres in 2020/2021, as a result of lockdowns caused by the COVID-19 pandemic, delayed the 66th awards to December 2022.)

- 2008
- 2009
- 2010
- 2011
- 2012
- 2015
- 62nd (2016)
- 63rd (2017)
- 64th (2018)
- 65th (2019)
- 66th (2022)
- 67th (2023)
- No ceremony held (2024)
- 2025 Evening Standard Theatre Awards

== Categories ==
Three of the awards are given in the names of former Standard notables:

- Arts editor Sydney Edwards (who conceived the awards, and died suddenly in July 1979) for the Best Director category.
- Editor Charles Wintour (who as deputy-editor in 1955, launched the awards after a nod from the proprietor, Lord Beaverbrook') for Most Promising Playwright.
- Long-serving theatre critic Milton Shulman (for several years a key member of the judging panel) for the Outstanding Newcomer award.

In 1980, noting the first use of the Special Award category, Shulman observed that "In 1968 the judges felt that Alan Bennett's work Forty Years On did not fit either the category of a Play or a Musical. But since they liked it so much they gave him the coveted Dobson statuette as a Special Award. In a quarter of a century, only in 1968 had no-one been designated as 'Promising' although it could conceivably be argued that Alan Bennett's Special Award was a reasonable substitute for this category."

The Special Award process came to a climax in 2004 when, in the 50th anniversary year, the category was used to signal peaks of accomplishment by the National Theatre (an institution), Harold Pinter (a playwright) and Dame Judi Dench (a performer). The Patricia Rothermere Award, presented biennially from 1999 to 2005, was created to honour the memory of Patricia Harmsworth, Viscountess Rothermere, wife of Viscount Rothermere, chairman of the Daily Mail and General Trust, which formerly owned the Standard. The two part award recognised those who had given outstanding support to young actors, while also providing a three-year scholarship award for a drama student.

In 2009, the Special Award was given in the name of Evgeny Lebedev, executive director of the Standard. Commencing in 2009, the Best Actress award was renamed in tribute to Natasha Richardson, who died after a skiing accident in Quebec in March 2009.

== Winners ==
=== Best Play ===
- 1955 – Tiger at the Gates by Jean Giraudoux
- 1956 – Romanoff and Juliet by Peter Ustinov
- 1957 – Summer of the Seventeenth Doll by Ray Lawler
- 1958 – Cat on a Hot Tin Roof by Tennessee Williams
- 1959 – The Long and the Short and the Tall by Willis Hall
- 1960 – The Caretaker by Harold Pinter
- 1961 – Becket by Jean Anouilh, adapted by Lucienne Hill
- 1962 – The Caucasian Chalk Circle by Bertolt Brecht, translated by John Holmstrom
- 1963 – Poor Bitos by Jean Anouilh, adapted by Lucienne Hill
- 1964 – Who's Afraid of Virginia Woolf? by Edward Albee
- 1965 – A Patriot for Me by John Osborne, and The Killing of Sister George by Frank Marcus (joint award)
- 1966 – Loot by Joe Orton
- 1967 – A Day in the Death of Joe Egg by Peter Nichols
- 1968 – The Hotel in Amsterdam by John Osborne
- 1969 – The National Health by Peter Nichols
- 1970 – Home by David Storey
- 1971 – Butley by Simon Gray
- 1972 – Jumpers by Tom Stoppard
- 1973 – Saturday, Sunday, Monday by Eduardo De Filippo, adapted by Keith Waterhouse and Willis Hall
- 1974 – The Norman Conquests by Alan Ayckbourn
- 1975 – Otherwise Engaged by Simon Gray
- 1976 – Weapons of Happiness by Howard Brenton
- 1977 – Just Between Ourselves by Alan Ayckbourn
- 1978 – Night and Day by Tom Stoppard
- 1979 – Amadeus by Peter Shaffer
- 1980 – The Dresser by Ronald Harwood
- 1981 – Passion by Peter Nichols
- 1982 – The Real Thing by Tom Stoppard
- 1983 – "Master Harold"...and the Boys by Athol Fugard
- 1984 – Benefactors by Michael Frayn
- 1985 – Pravda by Howard Brenton and David Hare
- 1986 – Les Liaisons Dangereuses by Christopher Hampton, adapted from the novel by Choderlos de Laclos
- 1987 – A Small Family Business by Alan Ayckbourn
- 1988 – Aristocrats by Brian Friel
- 1989 – Ghetto by Yehoshua Sobol
- 1990 – Shadowlands adapted by William Nicholson from a play Surprised By Joy by Brian Sibley and Norman Stone
- 1991 – Dancing at Lughnasa by Brian Friel
- 1992 – Angels in America by Tony Kushner
- 1993 – Arcadia by Tom Stoppard
- 1994 – Three Tall Women by Edward Albee
- 1995 – Pentecost by David Edgar
- 1996 – Stanley by Pam Gems
- 1997 – The Invention of Love by Tom Stoppard
- 1998 – Copenhagen by Michael Frayn
- 1999 – no award
- 2000 – Blue/Orange by Joe Penhall
- 2001 – Far Side of the Moon by Robert Lepage
- 2002 – A Number by Caryl Churchill
- 2003 – Democracy by Michael Frayn
- 2004 – The History Boys by Alan Bennett
- 2005 – The Home Place by Brian Friel
- 2006 – Rock 'n' Roll by Tom Stoppard
- 2007 – A Disappearing Number by Simon McBurney and Complicité
- 2008 – The Pitmen Painters by Lee Hall
- 2009 – Jerusalem by Jez Butterworth
- 2010 – Clybourne Park by Bruce Norris
- 2011 – One Man, Two Guvnors and The Heretic by Richard Bean
- 2012 – Constellations by Nick Payne
- 2013 – Chimerica by Lucy Kirkwood
- 2014 – The James Plays by Rona Munro
- 2015 – The Motherfucker with the Hat by Stephen Adly Guirgis
- 2016 – Harry Potter and the Cursed Child by Jack Thorne
- 2017 – The Ferryman by Jez Butterworth
- 2018 – The Inheritance by Matthew Lopez
- 2019 – Sweat by Lynn Nottage
- 2022 – Best of Enemies by James Graham
- 2023 – The Motive and the Cue by Jack Thorne

=== Best Director ===
Also known as The Sydney Edwards Award for Best Director from 1979. Renamed the Milton Shulman Award for Best Director from 2014.

- 1979 – Trevor Nunn for Once in a Lifetime
- 1980 – Trevor Nunn and John Caird for The Life and Adventures of Nicholas Nickleby
- 1981 – Peter Hall for The Oresteia
- 1982 – Richard Eyre for Guys and Dolls
- 1983 – Yuri Lyubimov for Crime and Punishment
- 1984 – Christopher Morahan for Wild Honey
- 1985 – Bill Bryden for The Mysteries
- 1986 – Nuria Espert for The House of Bernarda Alba
- 1987 – Peter Hall for Antony and Cleopatra
- 1988 – Deborah Warner for Titus Andronicus
- 1989 – Nicholas Hytner for Miss Saigon and Ghetto
- 1990 – Richard Jones for Into The Woods and The Illusion
- 1991 – Trevor Nunn for Timon of Athens
- 1992 – Stephen Daldry for An Inspector Calls
- 1993 – Terry Hands for Tamburlaine The Great
- 1994 – Sean Mathias for Les Parents terribles and Design for Living
- 1995 – Matthew Warchus for Volpone and Henry V
- 1996 – Katie Mitchell for The Phoenician Women
- 1999 – Trevor Nunn for Summerfolk and The Merchant of Venice
- 2000 – Howard Davies for All My Sons
- 2001 – Deborah Warner for Medea
- 2002 – Sam Mendes for Uncle Vanya and Twelfth Night
- 2003 – Polly Teale for After Mrs Rochester
- 2004 – Rufus Norris for Festen
- 2005 – Michael Grandage for Don Carlos and Grand Hotel
- 2006 – Marianne Elliott for Pillars of the Community
- 2007 – Rupert Goold for Macbeth
- 2008 – Michael Grandage for Ivanov and Othello and The Chalk Garden
- 2009 – Rupert Goold for Enron
- 2010 – Howard Davies for The White Guard and All My Sons
- 2011 – Mike Leigh for Grief
- 2012 – Nicholas Hytner for Timon of Athens
- 2013 – Richard Eyre for Ghosts
- 2014 – Jeremy Herrin for Wolf Hall and Bring Up The Bodies
- 2015 – Robert Icke for The Oresteia
- 2016 – John Malkovich for Good Canary
- 2017 – Sam Mendes for The Ferryman
- 2018 – Marianne Elliott for Company
- 2019 – Robert Icke for The Doctor and The Wild Duck
- 2022 – Lynette Linton for Blues for an Alabama Sky

=== Best Actor ===
- 1955 – Richard Burton for Henry V
- 1956 – Paul Scofield for The Power and the Glory
- 1957 – Laurence Olivier for The Entertainer
- 1958 – Michael Redgrave for A Touch of the Sun
- 1959 – Eric Porter for Rosmersholm
- 1960 – Alec Guinness for Ross, and Rex Harrison for Platonov
- 1961 – Christopher Plummer for Becket
- 1962 – Paul Scofield for King Lear
- 1963 – Michael Redgrave for Uncle Vanya
- 1964 – Nicol Williamson for Inadmissible Evidence
- 1965 – Ian Holm for Henry V
- 1966 – Albert Finney for A Flea in Her Ear
- 1967 – Laurence Olivier for Dance of Death
- 1968 – Alec McCowen for Hadrian VII
- 1969 – Nicol Williamson for Hamlet
- 1970 – John Gielgud and Ralph Richardson for Home
- 1971 – Alan Bates for Butley
- 1972 – Laurence Olivier for Long Day's Journey Into Night
- 1973 – Alec McCowen for The Misanthrope
- 1974 – John Wood for Travesties
- 1975 – John Gielgud for No Man's Land
- 1976 – Albert Finney for Tamburlaine the Great
- 1977 – Donald Sinden for King Lear
- 1978 – Alan Howard for Coriolanus
- 1979 – Warren Mitchell for Death of a Salesman
- 1980 – Tom Courtenay for The Dresser
- 1981 – Alan Howard for Good
- 1982 – Alec McCowen for The Portage to San Cristobal of A.H.
- 1983 – Derek Jacobi for Much Ado About Nothing
- 1984 – Ian McKellen for Coriolanus
- 1985 – Antony Sher for Richard III
- 1986 – Albert Finney for Orphans
- 1987 – Michael Gambon for A View from the Bridge
- 1988 – Eric Porter for Cat on a Hot Tin Roof
- 1989 – Ian McKellen for Othello
- 1990 – Richard Harris for Henry IV
- 1991 – John Wood for King Lear
- 1992 – Nigel Hawthorne for The Madness of King George III
- 1993 – Ian Holm for Moonlight
- 1994 – Tom Courtenay for Moscow Stations
- 1995 – Michael Gambon for Volpone
- 1996 – Paul Scofield for John Gabriel Borkman
- 1997 – Ian Holm for King Lear
- 1998 – Kevin Spacey for The Iceman Cometh
- 1999 – Stephen Dillane for The Real Thing
- 2000 – Simon Russell Beale for Hamlet
- 2001 – Alex Jennings for The Winter's Tale and The Relapse
- 2002 – Simon Russell Beale for Uncle Vanya and Twelfth Night
- 2003 – Michael Sheen for Caligula
- 2004 – Richard Griffiths for The History Boys
- 2005 – Simon Russell Beale for The Philanthropist
- 2006 – Rufus Sewell for Rock 'n' Roll
- 2007 – Patrick Stewart for Macbeth
- 2008 – Chiwetel Ejiofor for Othello
- 2009 – Mark Rylance for Jerusalem
- 2010 – Rory Kinnear for Hamlet and Measure for Measure
- 2011 – Benedict Cumberbatch and Jonny Lee Miller for Frankenstein
- 2012 – Simon Russell Beale for Collaborators
- 2013 – Adrian Lester and Rory Kinnear for Othello
- 2014 – Tom Hiddleston for Coriolanus
- 2015 – James McAvoy for The Ruling Class
- 2016 – Ralph Fiennes for The Master Builder and Richard III
- 2017 – Andrew Garfield for Angels in America
- 2018 – Ralph Fiennes for Antony and Cleopatra
- 2019 – Andrew Scott for Present Laughter
- 2022 – James McAvoy for Cyrano de Bergerac

=== Best Actress ===
Also known as The Natasha Richardson Award for Best Actress from 2009

- 1955 – Siobhán McKenna for Saint Joan
- 1956 – Peggy Ashcroft for The Chalk Garden
- 1957 – Brenda De Banzie for The Entertainer
- 1958 – Gwen Ffrangcon-Davies for Long Day's Journey Into Night
- 1959 – Flora Robson for The Aspern Papers
- 1960 – Dorothy Tutin for Twelfth Night
- 1961 – Vanessa Redgrave for As You Like It
- 1962 – Maggie Smith for The Private Ear and The Public Eye
- 1963 – Joan Plowright for Saint Joan
- 1964 – Peggy Ashcroft for The Wars of the Roses
- 1965 – Eileen Atkins for The Killing of Sister George
- 1966 – Irene Worth for A Song at Twilight
- 1967 – Lila Kedrova for The Cherry Orchard
- 1968 – Jill Bennett for Time Present
- 1969 – Rosemary Harris for Plaza Suite
- 1970 – Maggie Smith for Hedda Gabler
- 1971 – Peggy Ashcroft for The Loves of Viorne
- 1972 – Rachel Roberts for Alpha Beta
- 1973 – Janet Suzman for Hello and Goodbye
- 1974 – Claire Bloom for A Streetcar Named Desire
- 1975 – Dorothy Tutin for A Month in the Country
- 1976 – Janet Suzman for Three Sisters
- 1977 – Alison Steadman for Abigail's Party
- 1978 – Kate Nelligan for Plenty
- 1979 – Vanessa Redgrave for The Lady from the Sea
- 1980 – Judi Dench for Juno and the Paycock and Frances de la Tour for Duet for One
- 1981 – Maggie Smith for Virginia
- 1982 – Judi Dench for A Kind of Alaska and The Importance of Being Earnest
- 1983 – Geraldine McEwan for The Rivals
- 1984 – Maggie Smith for The Way of the World
- 1985 – Vanessa Redgrave for The Seagull
- 1986 – Julia McKenzie for Woman in Mind
- 1987 – Judi Dench for Antony and Cleopatra
- 1988 – Lindsay Duncan for Cat on a Hot Tin Roof
- 1989 – Felicity Kendal for Much Ado About Nothing and Ivanov
- 1990 – Josette Simon for After the Fall
- 1991 – Vanessa Redgrave for When She Danced (Martin Sherman)
- 1992 – Diana Rigg for Medea
- 1993 – Fiona Shaw for Machinal
- 1994 – Maggie Smith for Three Tall Women
- 1995 – Geraldine McEwan for The Way of the World
- 1996 – Diana Rigg for Who's Afraid of Virginia Woolf? and Mother Courage
- 1997 – Eileen Atkins for A Delicate Balance
- 1998 – Sinéad Cusack for Our Lady of Sligo
- 1999 – Janie Dee for Comic Potential
- 2000 – Paola Dionisotti for Further Than the Furthest Thing
- 2001 – Fiona Shaw for Medea
- 2002 – Clare Higgins for Vincent in Brixton
- 2003 – Sandy McDade for Iron
- 2004 – Victoria Hamilton for Suddenly, Last Summer
- 2005 – Harriet Walter for Mary Stuart
- 2006 – Kathleen Turner for Who's Afraid of Virginia Woolf?
- 2007 – Anne-Marie Duff for Saint Joan
- 2008 – Penelope Wilton and Margaret Tyzack for The Chalk Garden
- 2009 – Rachel Weisz for A Streetcar Named Desire
- 2010 – Nancy Carroll for After the Dance
- 2011 – Sheridan Smith for Flare Path
- 2012 – Hattie Morahan for A Doll's House
- 2013 – Helen Mirren for The Audience
- 2014 – Gillian Anderson for A Streetcar Named Desire
- 2015 – Nicole Kidman for Photograph 51
- 2016 – Billie Piper for Yerma
- 2017 – Glenda Jackson for King Lear
- 2018 – Sophie Okonedo for Antony and Cleopatra
- 2019 – Maggie Smith for A German Life
- 2022 – Jodie Comer for Prima Facie

=== Best Musical ===
Renamed the Ned Sherrin Award for Best Musical in 2007

- 1955 – The Pajama Game
  - The musical Salad Days received 1955 Award for Most Enjoyable Show
- 1956 – Cranks by John Cranko and John Addison
- 1957 – no award
- 1958 – West Side Story
- 1959 – Make Me an Offer by Wolf Mankowitz, Monty Norman and David Heneker
- 1960 – Fings Ain't Wot They Used T'Be by Frank Norman and Lionel Bart
- 1961 – Beyond the Fringe
- 1962 – no award
- 1963 – Oh, What a Lovely War!
- 1964 – Little Me
- 1965 – no award
- 1966 – Funny Girl
- 1967 – Sweet Charity
- 1968 – Cabaret
- 1969 – Promises, Promises
- 1970 – no award
- 1971 – no award
- 1972 – Applause
- 1973 – The Rocky Horror Show
- 1974 – John, Paul, George, Ringo … and Bert by Willy Russell
- 1975 – A Little Night Music
- 1976 – A Chorus Line
- 1977 – Elvis
- 1978 – Annie
- 1979 – Songbook by Monty Norman and Julian More
- 1980 – Sweeney Todd
- 1981 – Cats
- 1982 – Windy City by Dick Vosburgh and Tony Macaulay
- 1983 – Little Shop of Horrors
- 1984 – 42nd Street
- 1985 – Are You Lonesome Tonight by Alan Bleasdale
- 1986 – The Phantom of the Opera
- 1987 – Follies
- 1988 – no award
- 1989 – Miss Saigon
- 1990 – Into the Woods
- 1991 – Carmen Jones
- 1992 – Kiss of the Spider Woman
- 1993 – City of Angels
- 1994 – no award
- 1995 – Mack and Mabel
- 1996 – Passion
- 1997 – Lady in the Dark
- 1998 – Oklahoma!
- 1999 – Spend Spend Spend
- 2000 – The Car Man
- 2001 – Kiss Me, Kate (a revival)
- 2002 – The Full Monty
- 2003 – Jerry Springer: The Opera
- 2004 – The Producers
- 2005 – Billy Elliot
- 2006 – Caroline, or Change
- 2007 – Hairspray
- 2008 – Street Scene
- 2009 – Hello, Dolly!
- 2010 – Passion
- 2011 – Matilda
- 2012 – Sweeney Todd
- 2013 – Merrily We Roll Along
- 2014 – The Scottsboro Boys
- 2015 – Kinky Boots
- 2016 – Jesus Christ Superstar
- 2017 – Bat Out of Hell: The Musical
- 2018 – Hamilton
- 2019 – Evita
- 2022 – Oklahoma!

=== Best Musical Performance ===
- 2013 – Rosalie Craig for The Light Princess
- 2014 – no award
- 2015 – Imelda Staunton for Gypsy: A Musical Fable
- 2016 – Glenn Close for Sunset Boulevard
- 2017 – Amber Riley for Dreamgirls
- 2018 – Rosalie Craig for Company
- 2019 – Anne-Marie Duff for Sweet Charity
- 2022 – Patrick Vaill for Oklahoma!

=== Best Designer ===
- 1998 – Richard Hoover for Not about Nightingales
- 1999 – Rob Howell for Richard III, Troilus and Cressida and Vassa
- 2000 – Bunny Christie for Baby Doll
- 2001 – Paul Brown for Platonov and The Tempest
- 2002 – Ian MacNeil for Plasticine and A Number
- 2003 – Christopher Oram for Caligula
- 2004 – Ian MacNeil, Jean Kalman and Paul Arditti for Festen
- 2005 – Bob Crowley for Mary Poppins
- 2006 – Timothy Bird (projections) and David Farley (set and costumes) for Sunday in the Park With George
- 2007 – Rae Smith and the Handspring Puppet Company for War Horse
- 2008 – Neil Murray for Brief Encounter
- 2009 – Mamoru Iriguchi for Mincemeat at Cordy House in Shoreditch
- 2010 – Miriam Buether for Earthquakes in London and Sucker Punch
- 2011 – Adam Cork for Anna Christie and King Lear
- 2012 – Soutra Gilmour for Inadmissible Evidence and Antigone
- 2013 – Bob Crowley for People and The Audience and Once
- 2014 – Es Devlin for American Psycho
- 2015 – Anna Fleischle for Hangmen
- 2016 – Gareth Fry and Pete Malkin for The Encounter
- 2017 – Bunny Christie for Heisenberg, Ink and The Red Barn
- 2018 – Miriam Buether for The Jungle
- 2019 – Bunny Christie for A Midsummer Night's Dream
- 2022 – Tom Scutt for Cabaret

=== Best Comedy ===
- 1970 – The Philanthropist by Christopher Hampton
- 1971 – Getting On by Alan Bennett
- 1972 – Veterans by Charles Wood
- 1973 – Absurd Person Singular by Alan Ayckbourn
- 1974 – Travesties by Tom Stoppard
- 1975 – Alphabetical Order by Michael Frayn
- 1976 – The Thoughts of Chairman Alf by Johnny Speight
- 1977 – Privates on Parade by Peter Nichols
- 1978 – Gloo-Joo by Michael Hastings
- 1979 – A Day in Hollywood / A Night in the Ukraine by Dick Vosburgh and Frank Lazarus
- 1980 – Make and Break by Michael Frayn
- 1981 – Goose Pimples by Mike Leigh
- 1982 – Noises Off by Michael Frayn
- 1983 – Tales from Hollywood by Christopher Hampton
- 1984 – Stepping Out by Richard Harris
- 1985 – A Chorus of Disapproval by Alan Ayckbourn
- 1986 – A Month of Sundays by Bob Larbey
- 1987 – Serious Money by Caryl Churchill
- 1988 – Lettice and Lovage by Peter Shaffer
- 1989 – Henceforward... by Alan Ayckbourn
- 1990 – Man of the Moment by Alan Ayckbourn and Jeffrey Bernard is Unwell by Keith Waterhouse
- 1991 – Kvetch by Steven Berkoff
- 1992 – The Rise and Fall of Little Voice by Jim Cartwright
- 1993 – Jamais Vu by Ken Campbell
- 1994 – My Night with Reg by Kevin Elyot
- 1995 – Dealer's Choice by Patrick Marber
- 1996 – 'Art' by Yasmina Reza
- 1997 – Closer by Patrick Marber
- 1998 – no award
- 1999 – no award
- 2000 – Stones in His Pocket by Marie Jones
- 2001 – Feelgood by Alistair Beaton

=== Most Controversial Play ===
- 1955 – Waiting for Godot by Samuel Beckett (Only award in this category)

=== Editor's Award (renamed 'for a Shooting Star' in 2010) ===
- 2006 – Frost/Nixon
- 2007 – no award
- 2008 – Royal Shakespeare Company for its epic cycle of history plays
- 2009 – no award
- 2010 – Daniel Kaluuya for Sucker Punch
- 2011 – no award
- 2012 – David Hare
- 2013 – Kevin Spacey for his contribution to British theatre
- 2014 – Kate Bush for her remarkable theatre-based comeback live shows Before the Dawn
- 2015 – Vanessa Redgrave
- 2016 – Good Chance Theatre
- 2017 – no award
- 2018 – no award
- 2019 – Ian McKellen

=== Most Promising Playwright ===
Also known as the Charles Wintour Award for Most Promising Playwright

- 1955 – no award
- 1956 – John Osborne for Look Back in Anger
- 1957 – Robert Bolt for Flowering Cherry
- 1958 – Peter Shaffer for Five Finger Exercise
- 1959 – John Arden for Serjeant Musgrave's Dance and Arnold Wesker for Roots
- 1960 – J P Donleavy for Fairy Tales of New York
- 1961 – Gwyn Thomas for The Keep and Henry Livings for Stop It Whoever You Are
- 1962 – David Rudkin for Afore Night Come
- 1963 – Charles Wood for Cockade and James Saunders for Next Time I'll Sing To You
- 1964 – no award
- 1965 – David Mercer for Ride a Cock Horse
- 1966 – David Halliwell for Little Malcolm and His Struggle Against the Eunuchs
- 1967 – Tom Stoppard for Rosencrantz and Guildenstern are Dead and David Storey for The Restoration of Arnold Middleton
- 1968 – no award
- 1969 – Peter Barnes for The Ruling Class
- 1970 – David Hare for Slag and Heathcote Williams for AC/DC
- 1971 – E A Whitehead for The Foursoe
- 1972 – Wilson John Haire for Within Two Shadows
- 1973 – David Williamson for The Removalists
- 1974 – Mustapha Matura for Play Mas
- 1975 – Stephen Poliakoff for Hitting Town
- 1976 – Stewart Parker for Spokesong
- 1977 – Mary O'Malley for Once a Catholic and James Robson for Factory Birds
- 1978 – John Byrne for The Slab Boys and Brian Clark for Whose Life Is It Anyway?
- 1979 – Richard Harris for Outside Edge and Victoria Wood for Talent
- 1980 – Paul Kember for Not Quite Jerusalem
- 1981 – Nell Dunn for Steaming
- 1982 – Terry Johnson for Insignificance
- 1983 – Phil Young for Crystal Clear
- 1984 – Sharman MacDonald for When I Was a Girl, I Used to Scream and Shout
- 1985 – Billy Hamon for Grafters
- 1986 – Frank McGuinness for Observe the Sons of Ulster Marching Towards the Somme
- 1987 – Stephen Bill for Curtains
- 1988 – Timberlake Wertenbaker for Our Country's Good
- 1989 – Stephen Jeffreys for Valued Friends
- 1990 – Clare McIntyre for My Heart's a Suitcase
- 1991 – Rona Munro for Bold Girls
- 1992 – Philip Ridley for The Fastest Clock in the Universe
- 1993 – Brad Fraser for Unidentified Human Remains and Simon Donald for The Life of Stuff
- 1994 – Jonathan Harvey for Babies
- 1995 – Jez Butterworth for Mojo
- 1996 – Martin McDonagh for The Beauty Queen of Leenane
- 1997 – Conor McPherson for The Weir
- 1998 – Mark Ravenhill for Handbag
- 1999 – Rebecca Gilman for The Glory of Living
- 2000 – Gary Mitchell for The Force of Change
- 2001 – Roy Williams for Clubland
- 2002 – Vassily Sigarev for Plasticine
- 2003 – Kwame Kwei-Armah for Elmira's Kitchen
- 2004 – no award
- 2005 – Nell Leyshon for Comfort Me With Apples
- 2006 – Nina Raine for Rabbit
- 2007 – Polly Stenham for That Face
- 2008 – Tarell Alvin McCraney for In the Red and Brown Water and The Brothers Size
- 2009 – Alia Bano for Shades
- 2010 – Anya Reiss for Spur of the Moment
- 2011 – Penelope Skinner for The Village Bike
- 2012 – Lolita Chakrabarti for Red Velvet
- 2013 – Rachel De-lahay for Routes
- 2014 – Beth Steel for Wonderland
- 2015 – Molly Davies for God Bless The Child
- 2016 – Charlene James for Cuttin It
- 2017 – Branden Jacobs-Jenkins for An Octoroon
- 2018 – Natasha Gordon for Nine Night
- 2019 – Jasmine Lee-Jones for seven methods of killing kylie jenner
- 2022 – Tyrell Williams for Red Pitch
- 2023 – Isley Lynn for The Swell

=== Outstanding Newcomer ===
Also known as the Milton Shulman Award for Outstanding Newcomer

Note: Category ceased but is re-styled as the Emerging Talent Award

- 1999 – Eve Best for Tis Pity She's a Whore
- 2000 – Chiwetel Ejiofor for Blue/Orange
- 2001 – Rufus Norris for Afore Night Come
- 2002 – Jake Gyllenhaal for This Is Our Youth
- 2003 – Tom Hardy for Blood and In Arabia We'd All Be Kings
- 2004 – Eddie Redmayne for The Goat: or, Who Is Sylvia?
- 2005 – Menier Chocolate Factory: David Babani and Danielle Tarento
- 2006 – Andrew Garfield for Beautiful Thing; Burn/Chatroom/Citizenship; The Overwhelming
- 2007 – Stephen Wight for Dealer's Choice and Don Juan in Soho
- 2008 – Ella Smith for Fat Pig
- 2009 – Lenny Henry for Othello
- 2010 – Kate Bond and Morgan Lloyd for You Me Bum Bum Train
- 2011 – Kyle Soller for The Faith Machine, The Glass Menagerie and Government Inspector
- 2012 – Matthew Tennyson for Making Noise Quietly
- 2013 – Seth Numrich for Sweet Bird of Youth

=== Emerging Talent ===
- 2013 – Cush Jumbo for Josephine and I
- 2014 – Laura Jane Matthewson for Dogfight
- 2015 – David Moorst for Violence and Son
- 2016 – Tyrone Huntley for Jesus Christ Superstar
- 2017 – Tom Glynn-Carney for The Ferryman
- 2018 – Jamael Westman for Hamilton
- 2019 – Laurie Kynaston for The Son
- 2022 – Isobel McArthur for Pride and Prejudice* (*sort of)
- 2023 – Tatenda Shamiso for No I.D.
- 2025 – Gracie Oddie-Jones for The Lady from the Sea

=== Theatrical Achievement ===
- 1998 – Jonathan Kent and Ian McDiarmid of the Almeida Theatre (Only award in this category)

=== Lady Rothermere Drama Award ===
Two part award, originally as the Patricia Rothermere Award

- 1992 - Fionuala Clarence, Scholarship award
- 1993 – Matthew Rhys, scholarship award
- 1997 – Judi Dench, for outstanding services to the theatre
  - 1997 – Mark Rice-Oxley, scholarship award
- 1999 – Simon Callow, for outstanding services to the theatre
  - 1999 – Martin Rea, scholarship award
- 2001 – Prunella Scales, for ...
  - 2001 – Cassandre Joseph, scholarship award
- 2003 – Richard Attenborough, for exceptional support for young actors
  - 2003 – Elif Yesil, scholarship award
- 2005 – Penelope Keith, for ...
  - 2005 – Hannah Croft, scholarship award

=== The Special Award (given as The Lebedev Special Award in 2009) ===
- 1968 – Alan Bennett for Forty Years On
- 1969–1971 – no award
- 1972 – Peter Daubeny (Impresario and organizer of the annual World Theatre Season, Aldwych Theatre 1967–1973)
- 1973 – Laurence Olivier
- 1974 – no award
- 1975 – Ben Travers
- 1976 – Peggy Ashcroft
- 1977 – Hampstead Theatre
- 1978 – no award
- 1979 – 25th Anniversary Special Award: Sir Peter Hall
- 1980 – Ralph Richardson
- 1981 – The Royal Shakespeare Company
- 1982 – John Gielgud
- 1983 – no award
- 1984 – Graeae Theatre Company sharing with The Theatre of Comedy Company
- 1985–1987 – no award
- 1988 – National Theatre 1963–1988: 25 Years of Achievement
- 1989 – Stephen Sondheim
- 1990–1997 – no award
- 1998 – Nicole Kidman for The Blue Room
- 1999–2001 – no award
- 2002 – Shakespeare's Globe
- 2003 – Max Stafford-Clark
- 2004 – 50th Anniversary Special Award: Harold Pinter (playwright), National Theatre (institution) and Dame Judi Dench (performer)
- 2005 – The Royal Court Theatre
- 2006 – The Tricycle Theatre for its pioneering work in political theatre
- 2007 – Stephen Tompkins for innovative theatre architecture
- 2008 – Kevin Spacey for bringing new life to the Old Vic
- 2009 – Ian McKellen for his contribution to British theatre
- 2010 – Michael Gambon
- 2011 – Kristin Scott Thomas
- 2012 – Nicholas Hytner
- 2013 – Andrew Lloyd Webber
- 2014 – Tom Stoppard
- 2015 – Stephen Sondheim
- 2016 – Kenneth Branagh
- 2017 – no award
- 2018 – Cameron Mackintosh
- 2019 – Peter Brook
- 2022 – Nica Burns and Vanessa Redgrave for their outstanding contribution to and support of London theatre during the COVID-19 pandemic

=== Theatre Icon Award ===
- 2013 – Maggie Smith

=== Moscow Art Theatre's Golden Seagull ===
- 2010 – Sir Peter Hall
- 2011 – Sir Tom Stoppard
- 2012 – Judi Dench

=== Beyond Theatre award ===
- 2011 – Pet Shop Boys and Javier de Frutos for The Most Incredible Thing
- 2012 – Danny Boyle and his teams for the opening ceremony for the London 2012 Olympics
- 2013 – BBC Proms 2013
- 2014 – Here Lies Love

=== Award For Comedy ===
- 2013 – David Walliams for A Midsummer Night's Dream

=== Best Revival of the Year ===
- 2014 – Skylight

== See also ==
- Laurence Olivier Awards
- Black British Theatre Awards
- Critics' Circle Theatre Awards
- WhatsOnStageAwards
- The Offies
- UK Theatre Awards

== Sources ==
- Celebration: 25 Years of British Theatre. W. H. Allen Ltd, 1980. ISBN 0-491-02770-2, for Awards 1955–1978
- Theatre Record and its annual Indexes, for Awards 1981 to date.
