= Kieron Barry =

British playwright

- Occupation: Playwright
- Years active: 2005 – present
- Website: www.kieronbarry.net

Kieron Barry is a British playwright.

== Early life ==
Barry was born in Stratford-upon-Avon and attended Glebelands School in Cranleigh. He later received degrees from Durham University and Goldsmiths College. At Durham he played trumpet and piano in a band called The Soul Patrol and was a member of the Durham Revue sketch group.

== Work ==
Barry's plays include Stockwell: The Inquest into the Death of Jean Charles de Menezes about the 2005 shooting of Brazilian Jean Charles de Menezes, which had two sell-out runs in London. The success of this play saw Barry nominated for the Charles Wintour Award for Most Promising Playwright at the 2009 Evening Standard Theatre Awards.

== Published works ==
- Numbers
- Embassyland
- Cumquats
- Black Soap
- Mahler and Rachmaninov

The works above have been published together under the title Five Plays.

- Stockwell
- Tomorrow in the Battle
- The Official Adventures of Kieron and Jade
- The Problem of Sex, or: Why Are We in Afghanistan?
