= David Byrne (playwright) =

British playwright (born 1983)

David Byrne (born 1983 in Stevenage) is a British playwright and formerly the artistic director of the New Diorama Theatre in Camden, London, and currently artistic director of the Royal Court Theatre. Byrne has also written for radio and television.

Byrne has received several awards: Writers' Guild of Great Britain and the List Awards for Drama, a Les Enfants Terribles Prize and the 2014 Offie for "Best Artistic Director".

Byrne's adaptation of Down and Out in Paris and London sold out at the Edinburgh Festival in 2015 and received multiple four and five star reviews before transferring to London.

The New Diorama Theatre, under Byrne's artistic directorship, has won two Empty Space Peter Brook Awards.

At New Diorama, Byrne developed relationships throughout the small and emergent theatre communities, using the theatre's resources to offer support for the development of new and challenging work, and new voices.

In July 2023, it was announced that David Byrne would assume the role of artistic director of The English Stage Company/Royal Court in early 2024.

In July 2024, Byrne received an honorary doctorate from the University of Hull.
