= The Flood (2019 film) =

- Theatrical release poster
- Directed by: Anthony Woodley
- Written by: Helen Kingston
- Produced by: Luke Healy
- Starring: Lena Headey; Ivanno Jeremiah; Mandip Gill; Jack Gordon; Peter Singh; Arsher Ali; Iain Glen
- Cinematography: Jon Muschamp
- Edited by: Mike Pike
- Music by: Billy Jupp
- Production company: Megatopia Films
- Distributed by: Curzon Artificial Eye
- Release date: 21 June 2019 (United Kingdom)
- Running time: 99 minutes
- Country: United Kingdom
- Language: English
- Box office: £5,966

The Flood is a 2019 British drama film directed by Anthony Woodley from a screenplay by Helen Kingston. It stars Lena Headey, Ivanno Jeremiah, Mandip Gill, Jack Gordon, Peter Singh, Arsher Ali and Iain Glen.

The film was released in the United Kingdom on 21 June 2019 by Curzon Artificial Eye. It received mixed reviews from critics.

== Synopsis ==
Wendy (Lena Headey), a hardened immigration officer is offered a high-profile asylum case, judged on her ability to quickly and clinically reject applicants. Through her interrogation, she must uncover whether Haile (Ivanno Jeremiah) is lying and has a more sinister reason for seeking asylum. We follow Haile on his perilous 5,000 km journey over oceans, across borders, and amidst the flurry of the Calais Jungle to find solace and safety in the UK. But now he must cross the final hurdle.

== Cast ==
- Lena Headey as Wendy
- Ivanno Jeremiah as Haile
- Mandip Gill as Reema
- Jack Gordon as Russell
- Peter Singh as Faz
- Arsher Ali as Nasrat
- Iain Glen as Philip

== Production ==
In March 2017, it was announced Lena Headey had joined the cast of the film, with Anthony Woodley directing from a screenplay by Helen Kingston. Headey will also serve as an executive producer on the film, while Megatopia Films will produce the film. In April 2017, Ivanno Jeremiah, Iain Glen and Jack Gordon had joined the cast of the film.

== Filming ==
Filming began in April, 2017, in London and the Calais Jungle. Joss Bay in Kent doubled as an italian coastline during filming and production also visited the Port of Ramsgate.

== Release ==
In May 2019, Curzon Artificial Eye acquired U.K. distribution rights to the film. The film was released on 21 June 2019. It was scheduled to be released in the United States on 1 May 2020, by Samuel Goldwyn Films.

== Reception ==
=== Box office ===
In the United Kingdom, the film opened on 21 June 2019 grossing £3,983 from 4 screens in its opening weekend, finishing twenty-ninth at the box office. It grossed another £113 in its second weekend and grossing £5,563 through 10 days. The film has grossed a total of £5,966 in its fourth week of release.

=== Critical response ===
Review aggregator website Rotten Tomatoes reports an approval rating of 69% based on 39 reviews, with an average rating of 6.4/10. The site's critical consensus reads, "Imperfect yet ultimately honorable, The Flood takes an empathetic look at the plight of asylum seekers in the 21st century."

Sheila O'Malley of RogerEbert.com gave the film three out of four stars, praising its attention to the human consequences of asylum procedures while criticizing its "pedestrian look" and its focus on Wendy's personal life. Peter Bradshaw of The Guardian described the film as well-meaning and honestly acted, but criticized it as "glib, programmatic and contrived". Michael Ordoña of the Los Angeles Times wrote that the film humanized migrants and praised the performances, but said its drama "dries up" as the story develops.
