= Retrograde (play) =

Play by Ryan Calais Cameron, premiered in 2023

- Cover of the 2nd edition of the play text, featuring, L.-R. cast members Stanley Townsend, Ivanno Jeremiah, and Oliver Johnstone (Bloomsbury, 2025)
- Written by: Ryan Calais Cameron
- Based on: Sidney Poitier
- Characters: Sidney Poitier; Bobby; Mr Parks
- Subject: McCarthyism
- Setting: 1950s, NBC Studios (New York City)

Premiere
- Date: 20 April 2023
- Place: Kiln Theatre
- Original run: 20 April 2023 – 27 May 2023

Retrograde is a 90-minute play by Ryan Calais Cameron inspired by the early career of actor Sidney Poitier during the McCarthyism era. The play was premiered on 20 April 2023 at Kiln Theatre in London, before transferring to Apollo Theatre in the West End in 2025 and to Arts Centre Melbourne in Australia in 2026. It was nominated for the Evening Standard Theatre Award for Best Play in 2023, among other accolades.

== Background ==
Playwright Ryan Calais Cameron first became aware of Sidney Poitier after the actor was awarded with the Presidential Medal of Freedom by Barack Obama in 2009. Cameron was inspired to write a play that explores Poitier's experiences of both McCarthyism censorship as well as the height of Jim Crow laws. The writing of this play, which would become Retrograde, was financially enabled through Cameron winning The Offies's Adopt a Playwright Award scheme in 2018. Prior to being staged, the script was shortlisted for the Alfred Fagon Award in 2019 and the Verity Bargate Award in 2020.

== Synopsis ==
The play is set in the 1950s, when Sidney Poitier was an up-and-coming actor, at the cusp of his Hollywood breakthrough. Poitier meets with screenwriter Bobby (loosely based on Robert Alan Aurthur) and Mr Parks, NBC's lawyer, at NBC Towers in New York City, expecting to sign a contract before the shooting of soon-to-be-famous A Man Is Ten Feet Tall. Instead, the actor is asked to sign an oath of loyalty to America and to denounce one of his acting heroes Paul Robeson, an active civil right campaigner. Poitier is threatened with the loss of his role and with blacklisting in the industry if he refuses to sign the oath.

== Cast and characters ==
Character	Description	Original Off West End	West End	Melbourne
Character	Description	2023	2025	2026
Sidney Poitier	Based on the real-life actor in his early career	Ivanno Jeremiah	Ivanno Jeremiah	Donné Ngabo
Bobby	A screenwriter, loosely based on Robert Alan Aurthur	Ian Bonar	Oliver Johnstone	Josh McConville
Mr Parks	A lawyer of NBC	Daniel Lapaine	Stanley Townsend	Alan Dale

== Production history ==
In 2019, a staged reading of Retrograde took place at Criterion Theatre, with Ivanno Jeremiah reading the part of Sidney Poitier. The first fully staged production of the play took place at Kiln Theatre in Kilburn, London, where it ran from 20 April to 27 May 2023. Retrograde was transferred to Apollo Theatre in the West End in 2025, running from 8 March to 14 June. Jeremiah reprised his role as Poitier in both of these productions. Both London productions were directed by Amit Sharma, who was nominated for The Stage Debut Award for Best Creative West End Debut in 2025. The West End transfer was co-produced by Nica Burns and Colman Domingo. A professional recording of the West End production was made available for streaming via National Theatre Live on 9 September 2025.

Retrograde was debuted in Australia at Fairfax Theatre, Arts Centre Melbourne on 16 May 2026 and will run until 27 June the same year. It is produced by Melbourne Theatre Company and directed by Bert La Bonté.

== Critical reception ==
Ratings for Retrograde
Kiln Theatre, 2023
Review scores
Source	Rating
The Telegraph	5/5 stars
The Guardian	4/5 stars
The Standard	4/5 stars
The Independent	4/5 stars
WhatsOnStage.com	3/5 stars

Ratings for Retrograde
Apollo Theatre, 2025
Review scores
Source	Rating
The Telegraph	5/5 stars
WhatsOnStage.com	5/5 stars
Time Out	4/5 stars
BroadwayWorld	4/5 stars
The Independent	4/5 stars

Both the original and West End productions of Retrograde were positively reviewed across major British newspapers. Notably, it received five stars twice in 2023 and 2025 from Dominic Cavendish at The Telegraph, who praised Jeremiah's charisma and compared the play to Arthur Miller's The Crucible. Also giving the 2025 production five stars, WhatsOnStage's Maygan Forbes praised the acting of all three cast members: "Each actor commanding the stage with such ferocious talent that singling out a standout feels impossible". The Guardian's Arifa Akbar, in a four-star review of the 2023 production, commended Cameron's writing, which she described as "sabre-sharp, every demotic and period inflection perfected, every threat hewn and glimmering with intelligence". Time Out critiqued the use of cliches such as "the phone ringing at precisely the most tense moment, the convenient reasons for an actor to leave the stage or come back on" in an overall positive four-star review of the Apollo Theatre production. Similarly, Alexander Cohen from BroadwayWorld found the characterisation of Mr Parks "too caricatured as a vaudeville baddie". Giving the original production only three stars, Alun Hood from WhatsOnStage argued that the character of Sidney Poitier would benefit from more backstory being explored in the script.

== Awards and nominations ==
Year	Awards	Category	Nominee(s)	Result	Refs
2019	Alfred Fagon Award		Ryan Calais Cameron	Shortlisted	
2020	Verity Bargate Award		Ryan Calais Cameron	Shortlisted	
2023	Standard Theatre Awards	Best Play	Ryan Calais Cameron	Nominated	
2025	The Stage Debut Awards	Best Creative West End Debut	Amit Sharma (Director)	Nominated	
