= Ryan Ellsworth =

Canadian-born British actor

Ryan Ellsworth (born 6 October 1975 in Kelowna, British Columbia) is a Canadian-born British actor. A graduate of LAMDA, he made his professional stage debut in Declan Donnellan's production of Antigone at the Old Vic Theatre in 1999.

Other stage credits include The Round Dance at the Roundhouse, Where There's a Will for English Touring Theatre, Cat on a Hot Tin Roof at Theatr Clwyd, Henry V and Romeo and Juliet at Regent's Park Open Air Theatre and Labyrinth at Hampstead Theatre. In 2017–18, he played the title role in The Wizard of Oz at the Sheffield Crucible Theatre.

Ellsworth was a member of the Reduced Shakespeare Company touring the UK and Europe with The Complete Works of William Shakespeare (Abridged).

He has performed in Cheek by Jowl's productions of Cymbeline and Tis Pity She's a Whore. In 2022, Ellsworth was in the original London cast of Aaron Sorkin's adaptation of To Kill a Mockingbird at the Gielgud Theatre, directed by Bartlett Sher. He played George Voskovec in The Motive and the Cue directed by Sam Mendes at the National Theatre in 2023 and the West End transfer to the Noel Coward Theatre. Ellsworth returned to the National Theatre appearing in the Grapes of Wrath in 2024 and Hamlet in 2025.

His TV credits include Island at War for ITV and EastEnders for the BBC. In 2020, Ellsworth appeared in the period crime drama The Alienist: Angel of Darkness for TNT. In 2022, Ellsworth appeared as Murray Sinclair, father of Enid Sinclair, in the Netflix comedy horror series, Wednesday.
