= Joe Dixon (actor) =

English actor (born 1965)

- Born: Joseph Dixon; 10 October 1965 (age 61); Birmingham, England
- Occupation: Actor
- Years active: 1989–present
- Spouse: Lesley Manville (m. 2000; div. 2004)

Joe Dixon (born 10 October 1965) is an English actor who is perhaps best known for his role as Jacques in The Mummy Returns.

== Early life ==
Dixon was born in Birmingham in 1965 to Jamaican parents. He began acting at Castle Vale Comprehensive, where the drama teacher encouraged him to join the Birmingham Youth Theatre with his contemporary, Barry Aird. Dixon graduated from the Royal Academy of Dramatic Art and Castle Vale Comprehensive (now Greenwood Academy).

== Career ==
Dixon won the Ian Charleson Award for his 1991 performance as Jacques in Cheek by Jowls' all-male production of As You Like It, and was nominated for an Olivier Award for Best Performance in a Supporting Role for his 2003 performance in The Roman Actor at the Gielgud Theatre (Royal Shakespeare Company).

He also has extensive performances in film and television. A professional tenor, Joe Dixon sang the lead role in The Bacchae opera at Queen Elizabeth Hall, and was in the top ten in Denmark, Spain, and Russia for backing vocals. He plays the euphonium, guitar, tuba, and piano.

== Personal life ==
Dixon has two children, Zachary and Coco Rose, with his ex-fiancée Anna Jacobs. Dixon was married to actress Lesley Manville from 2000 to 2004.

== Filmography ==
Film
1995	Rich Deceiver	Pete Sparrow	TV movie
1998	Middleton's Changling	Franciscus	
2000	The Last Musketeer	D.C.I. Lyon	TV movie
2001	The Mummy Returns	Jacques Clemons	
2002	The Stretford Wives	Dave McCarthy	TV movie
2004	When I'm 64	Lynval	TV movie
2007	Rise of the Footsoldier	Mr. Khan	
2008	Criminal Justice (British TV series)	Robert Lloyd	
2010	14 Days with Victor	Martin	Currently in post production
2012	The Cold Light of Day	Dixon	
2015	The Carrier	Eric Mason	
2017	Hi-Lo Joe	Bruiser	
Television
1989	The Bill	Young Blood	One Episode: Duty Elsewhere
1990	The Manageress	Terry Moir	Six Episodes: Doing the Business, Pingvin Lakrids, Steal Your Heart Away, A Hundred and Ten Percent, A Match for Anyone, and At the End of the Day
1994	‘’Little Napoleons’’	Rap	Episode 1-4
1997	Frighteners	Jack	One Episode: Jevan
1997	Holding On	Eylot	Three Episodes: Episodes No.1.6 - 1.8
1999	An Unsuitable Job for a Woman	Alan	One Episode: Living on Risk
2007	Casualty	Martin Priddie	One Episode: The Apostate
2007	Silent Witness	'D.I. Simon Rush	Two Episodes: Suffer the Children: Part 1 and Suffer the Children: Part 2
2008	Criminal Justice	Robert Lloyd	Four Episodes: Episodes No.1.1 - 1.4
2010	Doctor Who	The Chancellor	One Episode: "The End of Time (Part 2)"
2013	Atlantis	Ramos	Thirteen Episodes: Episodes 1x1 to 1x13
2014	Lewis	Tony Maddox	Episode 8.3: Beyond Good and Evil
2016	Vera	George Haleford	Episode 6.2 "Tuesday’s Child"
2016	The Coroner	Samuel Mansfield	Episode 2.4 "The Beast of Lighthaven"
2017-2025	Midsomer Murders	Elliot Luthando	Episode 3, season 19 "Last Man Out"
2017-2025	Midsomer Murders	Noah Conoboy	Episode 3, season 25 "Death Strikes Three"
