= The Carrier (film) =

- Directed by: Anthony Woodley
- Written by: Luke Healy; Helen Kingston; Stefan Mitchell; Anthony Woodley
- Produced by: Luke Healy; Cody Lieberman; Anthony Woodley
- Starring: Edmund Kingsley; Jack Gordon; Karen Bryson
- Cinematography: Marcus Gillis
- Edited by: Drew King; Eugene Kotlyarenko
- Music by: Joseph Paul Alvarado
- Production companies: Megatopia Films; SPEIS Limited; Premiere Picture; Future Masters of Technology
- Distributed by: Altitude Film Distribution
- Release dates: 30 September 2015 (Raindance Film Festival); 26 January 2017 (UK)
- Running time: 86 minutes
- Country: United Kingdom
- Language: English

The Carrier is a 2015 British science fiction thriller film directed by Anthony Woodley, starring Edmund Kingsley, Jack Gordon and Karen Bryson.

== Cast ==
- Edmund Kingsley as Tobias Black
- Jack Gordon as Craig Turnpike
- Karen Bryson as Maria Adams
- Joe Dixon as Eric Mason
- Zora Bishop as Kate Hall
- Billy Clarke as Larry Cooper
- Andrew French as Kevin Adams
- Luke Healy as James Ayres
- Rebecca Johnson as Jess Ayres
- Walter van Dyk as Clarkson
- Josie Taylor as Terri Holmes
- Darren Stoneham as Wes
- Imogen Gearing as Olivia Ayres
- Hardeep Singh Kohli as Man
- James Littlewood as Ewan Thompson
- Luke Gomes as David

== Reception ==
Cleaver Patterson of Scream rated the film 2.5 stars out of 5 and wrote that the film "has all the feel of an inflight movie and something you’d probably only watch to pass the time."

Gareth Jones of Dread Central rated the film 2 stars out of 5 and wrote that the film is a "respectable, if sub-par, indie thriller with a few good ideas behind it… but it just never takes off."

Jeremy Aspinall of RadioTimes rated the film 2 stars out of 5 and wrote that while the film has a "committed" cast, it is not "particularly scary".
