= Christopher Shinn =

American playwright (born 1975)

- Born: 1975 (age 50–51); Hartford, Connecticut, U.S.
- Education: New York University (BFA)
- Occupation: Playwright
- Website: www.christophershinn.co

Christopher Shinn (born 1975) is an American playwright. His play Dying City (2006) was a finalist for the 2008 Pulitzer Prize for Drama, and Where Do We Live (2004) won the 2005 Obie Award, Playwriting.

== Early life ==
Shinn was born in Hartford, Connecticut in 1975 and lives in New York. He earned a BFA, Dramatic Writing, from New York University.

The Royal Court Theatre in London produced his first play Four and commissioned several plays from him. Shinn said: "The fifteen years I was embraced by the Court allowed me to become the artist I am today."

== Career ==
In an article about Shinn, Rob Weinert-Kendt observed: "If playwright Christopher Shinn has a signature character, it is the manipulative victim — the half-sympathetic, half-deplorable sort of person whose suffering is real but who uses it as rationale for bad behavior." As an example, in Dying City, "Shinn conjured twin terrors: a pair of brothers, one a straight soldier shipping off to Iraq, the other a successful gay actor."

Four was produced by the Royal Court Theatre in their Young Writers' Festival in 1998. The play was produced by the Worth Street Company at the TriBeCa Playhouse, New York City, in July 2001, directed by Jeff Cohen. It was produced by the Manhattan Theatre Club at Stage II in association with the Worth Street Company in January 2002.

Other People premiered at the Royal Court Theatre, Jerwood Theatre Upstairs in March 2000, directed by Dominic Cooke and featuring Daniel Evans, Doraly Rosen, James Frain, and Neil Newbon. The play opened Off-Broadway at Playwrights Horizons New Theater Wing in October 2000. The play takes place in the East Village in 1997 shortly before Christmas, and involves roommates, current and former, all artists in various fields.

Where Do We Live opened Off-Broadway at the Vineyard Theatre, running from May 11, 2004, to May 30, 2004. Directed by Shinn, the cast featured Emily Bergl, Daryl Edwards, Jesse Tyler Ferguson, Luke Macfarlane, Burl Moseley, Jacob Pitts, Aaron Stanford, Liz Stauber and Aaron Yoo. The play won the 2005 Obie Award, Playwriting and was nominated for the 2005 GLAAD Media Awards, Outstanding New York Theater: Broadway and Off-Broadway. It was first produced at the Royal Court in May 2002.

His play Dying City was produced Off-Broadway by Lincoln Center Theater at the Mitzi E. Newhouse Theatre, from February 15, 2007, in previews, officially on March 4, 2007, to April 29, 2007. Directed by James Macdonald the cast starred Rebecca Brooksher and Pablo Schreiber. The play had its world premiere in 2006 at the Royal Court Theatre in London. The play was a finalist for the 2008 Pulitzer Prize for Drama.

Shinn's play Now or Later premiered at the Royal Court Theatre in London from 3 September 2008 to 1 November 2008. Directed by Dominic Cooke, the cast featured Eddie Redmayne, Matthew Marsh, Adam James, Domhnall Gleason, Nancy Crane and Pamela Nomvete. The play takes place during a U.S. presidential election and focuses on the crisis that the gay son of the Democratic candidate is undergoing. The play had its US premiere at the Huntington Theatre Company, Boston in October 2012. Adriane Lenox, Tom Nelis and Grant MacDermott are featured, with direction by Michael Wilson.

His adaptation of Hedda Gabler premiered on Broadway at the Roundabout Theatre Company American Airlines Theatre, from January 6, 2009, to March 29, 2009. The play was directed by Ian Rickson and starred Mary-Louise Parker as Hedda Tesman, Michael Cerveris as Jorgen Tesman, Peter Stormare as Judge Brack, and Paul Sparks as Ejlert Lovborg.

Teddy Ferrara was commissioned by the Goodman Theatre, Chicago, and premiered there from February 2, 2013, to March 3, 2013, directed by Evan Cabnet. The play involves a gay college student, Gabe, whose life is complicated by a tragedy on campus. The play was produced in London at the Donmar Warehouse in October 2015, directed by Dominic Cooke.

An Opening in Time premiered at Hartford Stage, running from September 17 to October 11, 2015, directed by Oliver Butler. The play is set in New England and focuses on Anne, in her 60s, seeking to reconnect with a man from her past.

Against premiered at the Almeida Theatre, running from August 12 to September 30, 2017, directed by Ian Rickson and starring Ben Whishaw. The play is about a Silicon Valley billionaire who goes on a quest to try to get America to address its problem with violence.

His adaptation of Judgment Day premiered at Park Avenue Armory on December 5, 2019.

The Narcissist premiered at Chichester Festival Theatre, running from August 26 to September 24, 2022, directed by Josh Seymour and starring Harry Lloyd and Claire Skinner. The play is about a political consultant who is being courted by a Senator as his personal life faces crisis.

== Other work ==
He wrote Sandcastle for "The 24 Hour Plays" which was performed on September 24, 2001, starring Liev Schreiber and Lili Taylor. He wrote Dance of Life for the 2003 version of "The 24 Hour Plays", which was performed at the American Airlines Theatre in September 2003 and starred Rachel Dratch, Catherine Kellner and Sam Rockwell.

He participated in the Bush Theatre's 2011 project Sixty Six Books where he wrote a piece based upon a book of the King James Bible.

He wrote a short play for Headlong's 2011 project Decade about the impact and legacy of 9/11.

He has also written short plays for Naked Angels, and the New York International Fringe Festival.

Shinn's plays are published in collections from Theatre Communications Group and Methuen, and in acting editions from Dramatists Play Service.

Shinn teaches playwriting at The New School for Drama.

== Bibliography ==
Source: Internet Off-Broadway Database

- Four—1998, Royal Court Theatre
- Other People—2000, Royal Court Theatre
- The Coming World—2001, Soho Theatre, London
- Where Do We Live—2002, Royal Court Theatre
- What Didn't Happen—2002, Playwrights Horizons
- On the Mountain—2005, Playwrights Horizons
- Dying City—2006, Royal Court Theatre
- Now or Later—2008, Royal Court Theatre
- Hedda Gabler (adaptation)—2009, Roundabout Theatre Company, American Airlines Theatre
- Picked—2011, Vineyard Theatre
- Teddy Ferrara—2013, Goodman Theatre
- An Opening in Time—2015, Hartford Stage
- Against—2017, Almeida Theatre
- Judgment Day (adaptation)—2019, Park Avenue Armory
- The Narcissist—2022, Chichester Festival Theatre

== Awards and honors ==
For Dying City, Shinn was a 2008 Pulitzer Prize finalist, was nominated for the 2007 Lucille Lortel Award for Outstanding Play, and was nominated for the TMA Award for Best New Play (2006). Shinn won the Obie Award in Playwriting (2005) for Where Do We Live and was nominated for an Olivier Award for Most Promising Playwright (2003) for Where Do We Live He was shortlisted for the Evening Standard Theatre Award for Best Play (2008) for Now or Later and the South Bank Show Award for Theatre (2008) for Now or Later. In 2020, he was nominated for a Drama Desk Award for Outstanding Adaptation for Judgment Day.

He received a Guggenheim Fellowship in Playwriting (2005). He has received grants from the NEA/TCG Residency Program and the Peter S. Reed Foundation, and he is a recipient of the Robert Chesley Award for Lesbian and Gay Playwriting.

He was a 2019–2020 Radcliffe Fellow at Harvard. In 2020–2021, he was a Cullman Fellow at New York Public Library.

== Personal life ==
Shinn is openly gay. In 2012, Shinn was diagnosed with Ewing's sarcoma, a rare form of bone cancer, and had part of his left leg amputated.
