= Now or Later =

Play by Christopher Shinn

Now Or Later is a play by the American playwright Christopher Shinn. The play premiered at the Royal Court Theatre in London in 2008. Set in Democratic campaign headquarters on an American election night, the play deals with contemporary political themes, such as freedom of speech and depictions of Muhammad. The original run of the play was directed by Dominic Cooke, and featured actors Eddie Redmayne and Domnhall Gleason.
