= For Black Boys Who Have Considered Suicide When the Hue Gets Too Heavy =

2021 play by Ryan Calais Cameron

- West End Promotional Poster
- Original language: English
- Written by: Ryan Calais Cameron
- Based on: For Colored Girls Who Have Considered Suicide/When the Rainbow Is Enuf by Ntozake Shange
- Characters: Jet; Midnight; Obsidian; Onyx; Pitch; Sable

Premiere
- Date: 12 October 2021
- Place: New Diorama Theatre

For Black Boys Who Have Considered Suicide When the Hue Gets Too Heavy is a 2021 play by Ryan Calais Cameron, inspired by Ntozake Shange's For Colored Girls Who Have Considered Suicide/When the Rainbow Is Enuf. The play follows six young Black British men—Jet, Midnight, Obsidian, Onyx, Pitch, and Sable—meeting for group therapy.

The show was originally commissioned by New Diorama Theatre and co-commissioned by Boundless Theatre.

== Production history ==
=== Off-West End (2021-2022) ===
The show opened on 12 October 2021 at New Diorama Theatre in London, running until November. Tristan Fynn-Aiduenu directed the original production. The production transferred to the Royal Court for a limited 5 week run from 31 March 2022 to 7 May 2022.

=== West End (2023-2024) ===
The show transferred to the West End for a limited engagement at the Apollo Theatre from 25 March 2023 until 7 May. All six original cast members reprised their roles, and Ryan Calais Cameron directed. In November 2023, it was announced that the production would return to the West End for a nine-week limited engagement. The show started performances from 29 February 2024 at the Garrick Theatre.

== Cast ==
Character	Off-West End	West End	West End Remount
Character	2021-2022	2023	2024
Jet	Nnabiko Ejimofor	Nnabiko Ejimofor	Fela Lufadeju
Obsidian	Aruna Jalloh	Aruna Jalloh	Mohammed Mansaray
Onyx	Mark Akintimehin	Mark Akintimehin	Tobi King Bakare
Midnight	Kaine Lawrence	Kaine Lawrence	Posi Morakinyo
Pitch	Emmanuel Akwafo	Emmanuel Akwafo	Shakeel Haakim
Sable	Darragh Hand	Darragh Hand	Albert Magashi

== Awards ==
Year	Award	Category	Nominee	Result
2022	Stage Debut Awards	Best Performer in a Play	Mark Akintimehin, Emmanuel Akwafo, Nnabiko Ejimofor, Darragh Hand, Aruna Jalloh, and Kaine Lawrence	Won
2022	Black British Theatre Awards	Best Director	Ryan Calais Cameron and Tristan Fynn-Aiduenu	Won
2022	Black British Theatre Awards	Best Production (Play)		Won
2023	Laurence Olivier Awards	Best New Play		Nominated
2023	Laurence Olivier Awards	Best Actor in a Supporting Role	Mark Akintimehin, Emmanuel Akwafo, Nnabiko Ejimofor, Darragh Hand, Aruna Jalloh, and Kaine Lawrence	Nominated
