= Mamoru Iriguchi =

Japanese artist

- Born: Japan
- Occupations: Multimedia artist, Theatre designer
- Awards: Evening Standard Theatre Award for Best Designer

Mamoru Iriguchi is a Japanese multimedia artist and theatre designer. He studied zoology at Kyoto University and then obtained an MA in Theatre Design from Nottingham Trent University. His designs include Mincemeat which won in the best design category at the Evening Standard Theatre Awards in 2009, and The Pink Bits, which won the Oxford Samuel Beckett Theatre Award in 2004.
