= Elaine Constantine =

British writer and photographer

- Born: 1965 (age 60–61); Bury, Lancashire
- Known for: Photography, film directing

Elaine Constantine (born 1965 in Bury, Lancashire) is a BAFTA nominated writer/director and photographer, known for her colourful and upbeat fashion imagery of confident young women.

== Career ==
=== Photography ===
Constantine came to prominence in the 1990s due to work published in The Face magazine. Her energetic and honest take on young women attracted international interest when she was regularly commissioned by Italian Vogue editor, Franca Sozzani and US Vogue editor ;0 Anna Wintour.

==== Exhibitions ====
Constantine's first solo show was at Marion de Beaupre's Gallerie 213, Paris, in 1998. In 2002 Constantine exhibited Tea Dance, a show that documented the elderly tea dance culture of Northern England. Tea Dance has toured Paris, London, Rome, Amsterdam and Moscow.

==== Art collections ====
Constantine's work has been exhibited at London's The Photographers' Gallery, Tate Britain's Look at Me exhibition, curated by Val Williams, and the V&A's Imperfect Beauty exhibition, curated by Charlotte Cotton. A series of Constantine's prints are held in the photography collection at the National Portrait Gallery.

==== Editorial ====
Constantine has contributed to American, French and Italian Vogue. Her commercial clients have included Adidas, Alberto Bianni, Anna Molinari, Burberry, Clarins, Diesel, Gucci, Hunter, Lacoste, Levi's, Nike, Shiseido and Vivienne Westwood.

=== Feature film ===
In 2000 Constantine learned to screen write in order to create the feature-length screenplay for a film that would tell the story of her music and cultural obsession, Northern Soul. Constantine set up Stubborn Heart Productions and in late summer 2012 and returned to the north of England to direct the debut feature film, Northern Soul.

The film tells the Story of two Northern DJ's whose worlds are changed forever when they discover black American soul music. The film was released in October 2014 by Universal and reached the box office top 10 on its opening weekend despite a relatively limited distribution.

The film received nominations from both, The British Independent Film Awards, and the British Academy Awards (BAFTA). It also won the NME's award for Film of the Year, which was a public vote.

Constantine's book, of the same title, Northern Soul (An Illustrated History) was published by Random House' Virgin Books and co-edited by Gareth Sweeney, a factual and oral account of northern soul culture. The soundtrack, released by Demon Music, also of the same title, entered the top ten when released and went to the top of the soul chart.

=== Short film ===
Constantine directed the 9 minutes length 9 Kisses short film. The film was released in 2014.

== Awards ==
- 1998: John Kobal Foundation's Award
- 2002: Creative Review's Award for Best Up and Coming Promo Director
- 2005: Royal Photographic Society's Terence Donovan Achievement Award
- 2015: London Critics Circle Breakthrough British Filmmaker Award — Nominated.
- 2015: NME Best film of 2014 – Winner
- 2015: BAFTA Outstanding Debut for a Writer, Director or Producer Award – Nominated.
- The National Portrait Gallery's collection includes a portrait of Elaine Constantine by Immo Klink.
