= Alia Bano =

British playwright of Pashtun origin

Alia Bano (born 1980/1981) is a British playwright of Pakistani origin.

Born in Birmingham and a graduate of Queen Mary University of London, she currently works as a schoolteacher in London. Bano is a product of the Royal Court Theatre's programme for young playwrights, and her debut play Shades was staged at the Royal Court in early 2009. The play met with instant acclaim from the critics. Charles Spencer wrote in his four-star review in The Daily Telegraph: "Shades turns out to be something both special and unexpected – a Muslim Bridget Jones's Diary". Shades also received strong reviews in the Guardian, the Evening Standard and the International Herald Tribune among others and won Bano the award for Most Promising Playwright in the 2009 Evening Standard Awards.

Bano also took part in the Bush Theatre's 2011 project Sixty Six Books where she wrote a piece based upon a book of the King James Bible.
