= Ryan Calais Cameron =

British playwright

- Born: Ryan Peter Martin Cameron; 22 May 1988 (age 38); Tooting, London
- Education: Arts University Bournemouth
- Occupations: Playwright; screenwriter; director; actor; theatre producer
- Spouse(s): Shavani, née Seth (m. 2018)
- Children: 4
- Writing career
- Years active: 2011-present
- Subjects: Black masculinity, Black British identity, mental health, racism
- Notable work: For Black Boys Who Have Considered Suicide When the Hue Gets Too Heavy (2021)
- Notable awards: 2022 - Black British Theatre Awards for best play and best director 2024 - Sky Arts Awards for Theatre

Ryan Peter Martin Cameron, known professionally as Ryan Calais Cameron, (born 22 May 1988) is a British playwright, screenwriter, and actor. He is best known for his 2021 play, For Black Boys Who Have Considered Suicide When the Hue Gets Too Heavy, which has seen two sold-out West End productions. The play received two Laurence Olivier Awards nominations and won two Black British Theatre Awards, among other accolades.

== Early life and education ==
Cameron was born in Tooting and grew up in Catford, a majority working-class neighbourhood in Southeast London. Cameron is the only son and eldest of six children born to his parents, who were of Guyanese heritage. His grandparents migrated to the UK as part of the Windrush generation. As a child, Cameron briefly moved to Martinique with his family in 1999 before returning to London after a year.

Cameron has spoken about wanting to become an actor since his childhood. His early experience of acting was through attending classes at Albany Theatre as a teenager. However, Cameron did not always feel an affinity towards the theatre. "This theatre thing isn't made for me; it isn't speaking to me. They don't sound like me either", said Cameron of his experience of school trips to the theatre. Growing up in a predominantly working-class area, he was instead encouraged to pursue a more traditional trade and as such he trained as an electrician after leaving school.

Cameron returned to college at 19 and rediscovered his passion for acting. He earned a Bachelor of Arts in Acting from Arts University Bournemouth in 2011. He later received an honorary fellowship from the university in 2023.

== Career ==
=== Acting career ===
Cameron studied acting at university and pursued this path professionally before he started writing, which he is now best known for. Having had no personal connections in the industry, Cameron first sought acting opportunities by cold-contacting his favourite actors to ask for advice. One of such actors, Jimmy Akingbola, responded by encouraging Cameron to compete in the Monologue Slam competition that he was hosting. Cameron not only won the competition but was also noticed by agents and casting directors in attendance. It was through this competition that Cameron met director Clint Dyer, who eventually cast him in The Westbridge (written by Rachel De-lahay), staged at Royal Court Theatre in 2011. This was Cameron's first acting gig after graduating from university. The following year, he starred as Jason in Vivienne Franzmann's Mogadishu at the Lyric Theatre, Hammersmith as well as in the UK tour of the production. His TV credits include: Luther, Casualty, and Jekyll and Hyde.

Cameron's most recent stage role was in the West End debut run of Nassim Soleimanpour’s White Rabbit Red Rabbit in 2024, where he was one of the rotating performers.

=== Writing career ===
Cameron was inspired to start writing as he notices a lack of authentic, nuanced Black British representation as well as a lack of opportunity for Black performers in British theatre. While this has driven many of his contemporaries to seek stage opportunities in the US, Cameron chose instead to create original works that could create opportunities for Black actors like himself. He said in an interview in 2025: "I was always that person online saying, 'someone needs to write this idea for us'. So I thought, I'm just gonna have a go, and if it doesn't work, it doesn't work. But at least I can satisfy that creativity in my mind that's looking for something more than what I'm being offered." Cameron's writing is also guided by the ambition to bring more Black British and working-class audience to the theatre. Cameron believes that authentic stories is key to this: "if I can create stories for the people I meet on my street, then I'm positive I can get those people into the theatre".

Cameron's first major work was Timbuktu (2016), which was first staged as part of Bush Theatre's Black Lives Black Words Festival. He went on to write Rhapsody (2018), Typical (2019), followed by major West End hits, For Black Boys Who Have Considered Suicide When the Hue Gets Too Heavy (2021) and Retrograde (2023). He has cited the playwright debbie tucker green as one of his heroes.

In addition to plays, Cameron has also been a guest writer on a number of TV series, namely The Flatshare, Boarders, and Queenie.

==== Residencies ====
In 2019, Cameron received a writer’s fellowship from Theatre Centre, where he also became a resident writer and wrote Human Nurture, premiered in Sheffield and toured across the UK in 2022.

In 2021, Cameron was an associate artist on the Artists of Change programme at Albany Theatre, where he had previously had acting classes as a teenager. In 2024, he was appointed as an associate playwright at Royal Court Theatre.

==== Notable plays ====
===== Retrograde (2023) =====
Cameron first became aware of Sidney Poitier, the first Black man to win the Oscar for Best Actor, when Poitier was awarded with the Presidential Medal of Freedom by Barack Obama in 2009. The playwright became particularly interested in Poitier's experiences of the Red Scare and McCarthyism and how that affected Poitier's career. In 2018, Cameron won the Off West End's Adopt a Playwright award for his play Rhapsody, staged at the Arcola Theatre. The prize money from the scheme allowed him to create a new play, and thus Cameron started researching and writing Retrograde, inspired by the career of Sidney Poitier. The play was first read by a full cast on stage in 2019, starring Ivanno Jeremiah as Poitier. Retrograde was premiered at Kiln Theatre in 2023, with Jeremiah reprising his role. Jeremiah returned to the role again for the play's West End transfer to Apollo Theatre in 2025, with Colman Domingo as producer. Retrograde was premiered in Australia at Arts Centre Melbourne in May 2026, produced by Melbourne Theatre Company.

=== Production company ===
Also inspired by his frustration with the lack of diversity and representation in British theatre, Cameron and his wife, Shavani Cameron, co-founded their production company Nouveau Riche in 2015, hoping to create roles for young Black actors beyond the stereotypes of gangsters and drug dealers. In addition to Cameron's original works, Nouveau Riche has also produced plays written by other emerging Black British authors, notably Jessica Hagen. The company has also worked with Lewisham Council to organise the annual SEEN festival, which has platformed many Black performers and writers and those from other underrepresented groups.

== Personal life ==
In 2018, Cameron married his wife Shavani (née Seth); they had previously acted alongside one another in The Westbridge (2011) at Royal Court Theatre. Shavani also works in the theatre industry as an actress and producer. The couple reside in London and have four children. Cameron converted to Pentecostal Christianity as an adult.

== Writing credits ==
Key
†	Denotes upcoming work

=== Theatre ===
Year premiered	Title	Notable productions	Note
2016	Timbuktu	2016 - Bush Theatre (part of Black Lives Black Words Festival); 2018 - Theatre Royal Stratford East	
2017	Queens of Sheba	2018 - Edinburgh Festival Fringe; 2019 - UK tour (10 venues); 2021, 2023, 2024 - Soho Theatre; 2024 - Lincoln Center, Oklahoma Contemporary, Clarice Smith Performing Arts Center (US tour; part of Under the Radar Festival)	Co-written with Jessica Hagen; initially developed through Camden People's Theatre's Starting Blocks programme
2018	Rhapsody	2018 - Arcola Theatre	
2019	Typical	2019 - The Pleasance (part of Edinburgh Festival Fringe); 2021 - Soho Theatre	
2019	The Tide	2019 - Greenwich+Docklands International Festival and London Festival of Architecture; 2021 - UK tour	Co-created with Jade Hackett; produced by Talawa Theatre Company
2020	Shuga_b*tt	Written for audience’s self-produced readings	Commissioned by Theatre Centre and Theatre503 as part of the ImagiNation project - a collection of 19 plays.
2020	My White Best Friend (and Other Letters Left Unsaid)	2020 - Royal Court Theatre (online reading)	Cameron was one of 10 writers commissioned to write a monologue as part of an online festival curated by Rachel De-lahay and Milli Bhatia
2021	For Black Boys Who Have Considered Suicide When the Hue Gets Too Heavy	2021 - New Diorama Theatre; 2022 - Royal Court Theatre; 2023 - Apollo Theatre; 2024 - Garrick Theatre	
2022	Human Nurture	2022 - Studio Theatre, Sheffield and UK tour	Commissioned and produced by Theatre Centre
2023	Retrograde	2023 - Kiln Theatre; 2025 - Apollo Theatre; 2026 - Arts Centre Melbourne	
2026	The Afronauts †	2026 - Royal Court Theatre	Commissioned by Genesis Foundation

=== TV ===
Year	Title	Network / Production company	Notes / Refs
2022	The Flatshare	Paramount Plus	Guest writer - Episode 4
2024	Boarders	BBC Three	Series 1, episode 4
2024	Queenie	Channel 4	Episodes 2 and 7

== Selected acting credits ==
=== Theatre ===
Year	Title	Role	Venue(s)/Production	Notes
2011	The Westbridge	Andre	Royal Court Theatre	
2012	Mogadishu	Jason	Royal Exchange, Manchester, Lyric Hammersmith, and UK tour	
2013	The Dug Out	Sammy	Tobacco Factory Theatre	
2024	White Rabbit Red Rabbit		@sohoplace	Performing on 8 November 2024

=== Television ===
Year	Title	Role	Network / Production company	Notes / Refs
2011	Luther	Steve Meredith	BBC	Series 3, episode 3.
2012	Casualty	Connor Harper	BBC	Series 27, episode 6.
2015	Casualty	Jerome Parke	BBC	Series 29 - episode 34.
2015	Jekyll and Hyde	Georgie Collings	ITV	Episodes 8 and 9.

== Awards and nominations ==
Year	Award	Category	Nominated work	Results	Notes / Refs
2018	New Diorama and Underbelly's Untapped Award		Queen of Sheba	Won	
2018	Off West End 'Adopt A Playwright Award'		Rhapsody	Won	
2019	Alfred Fagon Award		Retrograde	Shortlisted	
2020	Verity Bargate Award		Retrograde	Shortlisted	
2020	The Offies	New Play	Typical	Nominated	
2022	Black British Theatre Awards	Best Production Play	For Black Boys Who Have Considered Suicide When the Hue Gets Too Heavy	Won	
2022	Black British Theatre Awards	Best Director	For Black Boys Who Have Considered Suicide When the Hue Gets Too Heavy	Won	
2023	Laurence Olivier Awards	Best New Play	For Black Boys Who Have Considered Suicide When the Hue Gets Too Heavy	Nominated	
2023	Standard Theatre Awards	Best Play	Retrograde	Nominated	
2024	Sky Arts Awards	Theatre	Body of work	Won	
