= The Nether =

American sci-fi crime drama

- Written by: Jennifer Haley

Premiere
- Date: 24 March 2013
- Place: Kirk Douglas Theatre, California

The Nether is a sci-fi crime drama play written by American playwright Jennifer Haley. The play received its world premiere at the Kirk Douglas Theatre in California in March 2013, after being first developed at the Eugene O'Neill Theater Center as part of the 2011 National Playwrights Conference. Subsequent productions have been mounted at the Royal Court Theatre in 2013, MCC Theater in 2014 and in the West End at the Duke of York's Theatre in 2015. It won the 2012 Susan Smith Blackburn Prize, and was nominated for Best New Play at the 2015 Laurence Olivier Awards.

== Plot ==
The play is set in the near future. The internet has evolved into the Nether, a vast network of virtual reality realms. Users may log in, choose an identity, and indulge any desire. When Detective Morris investigates a realm called The Hideaway where pedophiles may live out their fantasies involving children, she brings its creator in for interrogation. They discover they have made emotional attachments in his realm that blind them to the greater questions of ethical behavior, both in the imagination and the outside world.

== Characters ==
- Detective Morris: head of the investigation of The Hideaway
- Sims/Papa: creator of The Hideaway
- Doyle: an older man who has a connection to The Hideaway
- Iris: young girl who works at The Hideaway
- Woodnut: a frequent visitor at The Hideaway

== Production history ==
The world premiere at Center Theatre Group was directed by Neel Keller. It won 7 Ovation Awards for design, acting, and Playwriting for an Original Play. Headlong and the Royal Court produced The Nether in London in 2014, with Jeremy Herrin directing. In 2015 the show transferred to the West End’s Duke of York’s Theatre, produced by Sonia Friedman Productions, Scott M. Delman and Tulchin Bartner Productions, and was nominated for an Olivier Award for Best New Play. Manhattan Class Company produced the play in New York City in 2015, with Anne Kauffman directing. Truman State University produced the show in fall 2015. San Francisco Playhouse produced the play in January 2016, as did the Woolly Mammoth Theatre Company of Washington D.C. in April 2016, and the Alley Theatre in May 2016. More recently it was performed at the Jungle Theater in Minneapolis and at the Seymour Centre of Sydney, Australia, both in September/October 2017, as well as the Mosesian Center for the Arts in Watertown, MA outside of Boston in June 2018. Mohit Takalkar from India directed The Nether for Aasakta in September 2024 which opened at the Prithvi Theatre in Mumbai. It was set up in Swedish at the Royal Dramatic Theatre in Stockholm in 2017, directed by Lena Endre. In 2026, the play was staged by HuM Theatre at the Esplanade in Singapore, directed by Yogesh Tadwalkar.
