= Jennifer Haley =

American playwright

- Education: University of Texas, Austin (BFA); Brown University (MFA)
- Occupation: Playwright
- Writing career
- Notable work: The Nether
- Notable awards: 2012 Susan Smith Blackburn Prize
- Website: jenniferhaley.com

Jennifer Haley (born October 3, 1974) is an American playwright. She grew up in San Antonio, Texas and studied acting at the University of Texas at Austin for her undergraduate degree. Haley also received a MFA in playwriting at Brown University in 2005, where she worked under American playwright and professor, Paula Vogel. Now living in Los Angeles, Haley is pursuing a career in theatre, film and television.

== Early years ==
She grew up in San Antonio, Texas, and lived there until she was nine, then moved to Houston, where she attended Jack Albright Middle School and Alief Elsik High School. She went to University of Texas, Austin as a double major of Liberal Studies and Theatre. Haley first began writing during her last few years of undergrad to increase the number of roles available to women. Susan Zeder, her playwriting professor, approached her after a piece she had written, and Haley deferred that she was not a playwright, but Zeder told her she was. She would go to pursue a playwriting degree at Brown University. Both Vogel, her mentor and professor at Brown, and Zeder's guidance, she began to shift her focus towards playwriting over the next few years.

In the late 1990s, she moved to Seattle to become a web designer, while still writing plays at night. This would influence her work, as technology is prevalent in many of her plays.

== Career ==
Her play, The Nether, was developed at the O'Neill National Playwrights Conference, Lark Play Development Center, and the Philadelphia Theatre Company. It had two workshops at the Center Theatre Group before it was staged in March 2013, at the Royal Court Theatre in July 2014, and at the MCC Theater in February 2015. It won the 2012 Susan Smith Blackburn Prize and seven Los Angeles Ovation Awards. In January 2015, the Royal Court production transferred to the West End. It was nominated for Best New Play at the 2015 Olivier Awards.

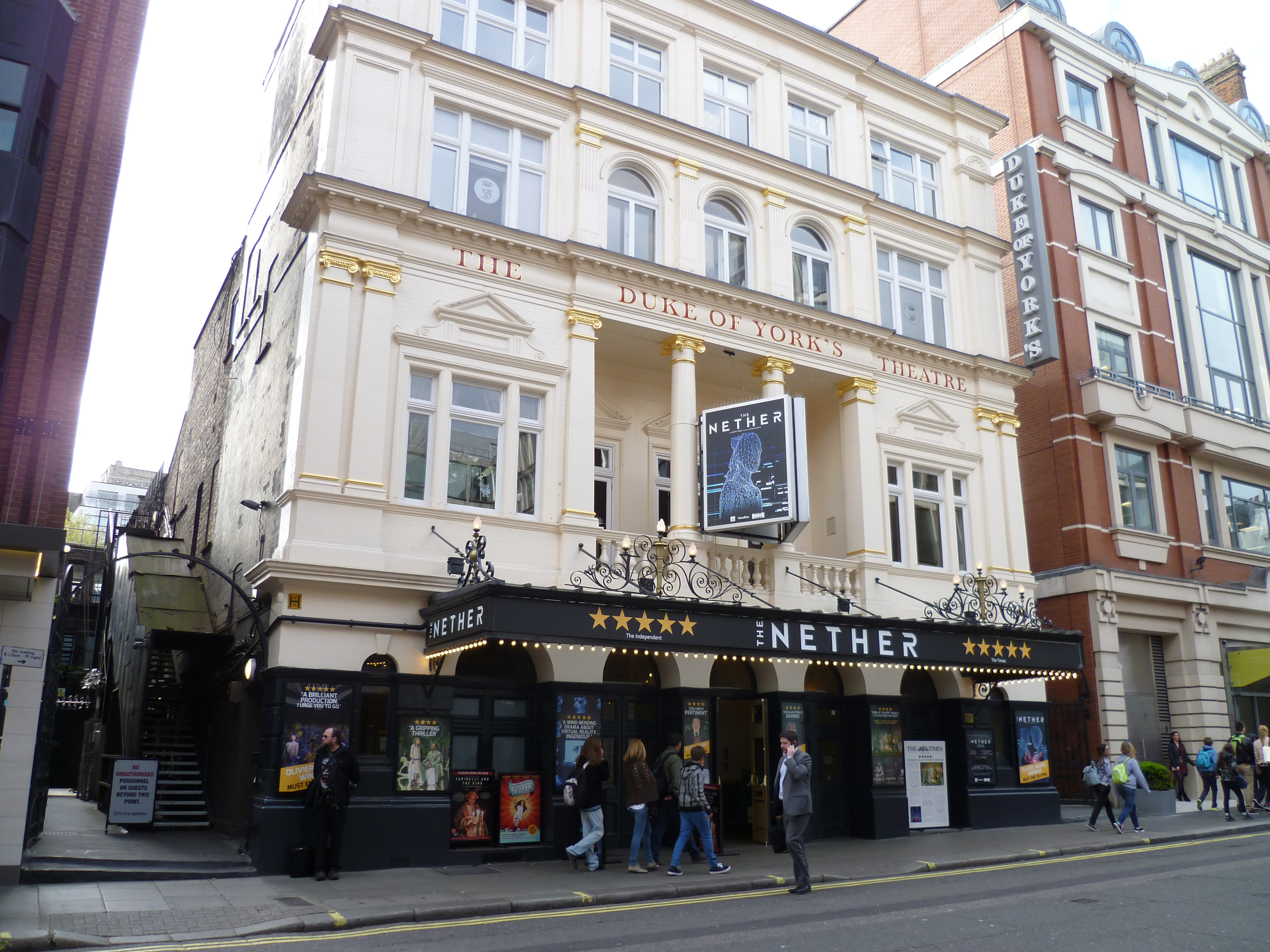
The Nether, produced at the West End's Duke of York's Theatre in 2015.

Haley has worked with Center Theatre Group, the Royal Court Theatre, the Humana Festival of New American Plays, American Conservatory Theater, Theater 150, the Contemporary American Theater Festival, The Banff Centre, Sundance Theatre Lab, O'Neill National Playwrights Conference, Lark Play Development Center, Sacred Fools Theater Company, PlayPenn, Page 73, Millay Colony for the Arts, and the MacDowell Colony.

She is a member of New Dramatists and the founder of LA's The Playwrights Union. Hosting events throughout the year, The Playwrights Union is a casual collective of playwrights in Los Angeles seeking to encourage new work for theatre, film and television.

Haley's other plays include Froggy and Neighborhood 3: Requisition of Doom, which premiered at the Actor's Theatre of Louisville 2008 Humana Festival.

== TV and Film ==
In addition to her work for the theatre, Haley wrote for the Netflix series Hemlock Grove and for the David Fincher-helmed series Mindhunter.

== Awards and honors ==
In 2012 Haley was the recipient of the Susan Smith Blackburn Prize for her production of The Nether.

For television, Haley, along with Erin Levy, won the 2017 My Entertainment World award for Outstanding Writing for a Drama for Mindhunter's "Episode 8".

== Filmography ==
Year	Role	Title	Notes
1999	Dai-Guard	Domeki	English version; Voice
2014	Hemlock Grove	—N/a	Writer, 2 episodes
2017	Mindhunter	—N/a	Writer, 1 episode; co-producer, 8 episodes

== Plays ==
- The Nether
- Neighborhood 3
- Sustainable Living
- Breadcrumbs
- Froggy

== Personal life ==
Haley lost her father to alcoholism in 2010.

She listed Qui Nguyen, Anne Washburn, Lisa D'Amour, Young Jean Lee, Luis Alfaro, and Caryl Churchill as some of her favorite contemporary playwrights. She cited Black Hole and Like a Velvet Glove Cast in Iron as favorite graphic novels, the latter inspiring Froggy.
