= The Motive and the Cue =

2023 play by Jack Thorne

- West End Promotional Poster
- Original language: English
- Written by: Jack Thorne
- Subject: History, acting, Shakespeare
- Genre: Drama
- Setting: 1960s New York City

Premiere
- Date: 21 April 2023
- Place: Lyttelton Theatre, Royal National Theatre, London
- Directed by: Sam Mendes

The Motive and the Cue is a play written by Jack Thorne. The production, directed by Sam Mendes, premiered on 21 April 2023 in the Lyttelton Theatre at the London's Royal National Theatre. The play revolves around the history behind the 1964 Broadway production of William Shakespeare's Hamlet starring Richard Burton and directed by John Gielgud. As rehearsals progress, two ages of theatre collide and the collaboration between actor and director soon threatens to unravel. The original London cast included Johnny Flynn as Burton, Mark Gatiss as Gielgud, and Tuppence Middleton as Elizabeth Taylor.

== Background ==
Mendes decided to stage the play after reading Richard L. Sterne's John Gielgud Directs Richard Burton and William Redfield's Letters from an Actor, with Thorne joining to write the script. Mendes previously collaborated with production designer Es Devlin on The Lehman Trilogy. The production runs for two hours and 40 minutes.

== Plot ==
The play revolves around the dynamic and tense relationship between a young, enthusiastic Richard Burton and an aging John Gielgud during the 1964 modern-dress Broadway production of Hamlet.

== Roles and cast ==
Role	National Theatre — Lyttelton / Noël Coward Theatre 2023
Richard Burton	Johnny Flynn
John Gielgud	Mark Gatiss
Elizabeth Taylor	Tuppence Middleton
Hume Cronyn	Allan Corduner
George Voskovec	Ryan Ellsworth
William Redfield	Luke Norris
Jessica Levy	Aysha Kala / Elena Delia

== Production ==
The play originated at the National Theatre, written by Jack Thorne, and directed by Sam Mendes, with previews opening on 21 April 2023.

Following the play's success at the National Theatre, the production transferred to the Noël Coward Theatre in London's West End from 9 December 2023 for a limited run until 23 March 2024. Flynn, Gatiss and Middleton reprised their roles as Burton, Gielgud and Taylor.

The play was broadcast on National Theatre Live in March/April 2024, and again in February 2027.

== Reception and accolades ==
Critical reception for the play has been mostly positive, in particular for the leading performance of John Gielgud by Mark Gatiss. In The Independent, theatre critic Jessie Thompson declared: "It's Gatiss, as Gielgud, who owns this show. He deserves all the superlatives for a performance of restrained, quiet dignity, laced with sharp wit." The Standard described the production as "elegant" and "a love letter to theatre". The Telegraph's Dominic Cavendish hailed the play as "a witty, deft, touching evocation of a fascinating, fraught encounter that captures the mood of those times". Arifa Akbar of The Guardian gave a mixed review, praising the performances but noting that "ultimately, this play-about-the-play leaves us wishing we had been there to see Burton in the real thing".

=== Awards and nominations ===
Year	Award	Category	Nominee	Result
2024	WhatsOnStage Awards	Best New Play		Nominated
2024	WhatsOnStage Awards	Best Direction	Sam Mendes	Nominated
2024	WhatsOnStage Awards	Best Casting Direction	Alastair Coomer & Naomi Downham	Nominated
2024	Laurence Olivier Awards	Best New Play	Jack Thorne	Nominated
2024	Laurence Olivier Awards	Best Actor	Mark Gatiss	Won
2024	Laurence Olivier Awards	Best Director	Sam Mendes	Nominated

== See also ==
- English drama
- Theatre of the United Kingdom
