= New Diorama Theatre =

Theatre in London, England

- Interactive map of New Diorama Theatre
- Address: 15-16 Triton Street, Regents Place; London; United Kingdom
- Coordinates: 51.52494°N 0.14216°W
- Capacity: 80 seats
- Type: Off West End theatre
- Current use: Theatre

Construction
- Opened: 2010
- Years active: 2010-to date

Website
- www.newdiorama.com

The New Diorama Theatre is an eighty-seat theatre near Regent's Park in the London Borough of Camden, opened in 2010. The theatre received two Peter Brook awards during the first two years of its programming.

== History ==
New Diorama Theatre opened in 2010 in the new British Land development of Regents Place as part of a Section 106 Agreement. As such, it has a responsibility to serve local workers and residents.

Artistic Director Bec Martin left in August 2024 due to creative differences. The former artistic director is the playwright David Byrne.

== Awards ==
New Diorama Theatre received two consecutive Peter Brook awards for the first two years of its programming. David Byrne received the 2014 Offi for Best Artistic Director.

In 2022, the New Diorama Theatre was awarded Fringe Theatre of the Year, and in 2023, it was awarded the Critics' Circle Venue Award.

Year	Organization	Award	Ref
2016	Peter Brook Awards	Peter Brook Empty Stage Award	
2017	The Stage Awards	Fringe Theatre of The Year	
2018	Peter Brook Awards	Peter Brook Empty Stage Award	
2019	The Stage Awards	Innovation Award	
2022	The Stage Awards	Fringe Theatre of the Year	
2023	Critics' Circle	The Empty Space Peter Brook Award	

== Notable Commissions and Premieres ==
- Container (2025) by Alan Fielden
- For Black Boys Who Have Considered Suicide When the Hue Gets Too Heavy (2021) by Ryan Calais Cameron
- The Incident Room (2021)
- Operation Mincemeat (2019) by SpitLip
