= Pride (musical) =

2026 stage musical

- The Musical
- Production Poster
- Music: Christopher Nightingale; Josh Cohen; DJ Walde
- Lyrics: Stephen Beresford
- Book: Stephen Beresford
- Setting: 1984 British miners' strike
- Basis: Pride by Stephen Beresford
- Premiere: 31 March 2026: Sherman Theatre, Cardiff
- Productions: 2026 Cardiff; 2026 London

Pride is a musical with book and lyrics by Stephen Beresford and music by Christopher Nightingale, Josh Cohen and DJ Walde. The musical is based on Beresford's 2014 film of the same name which depicts the true story of the Lesbians and Gays Support the Miners campaign during the British miners' strike in 1984.

The musical, directed by Matthew Warchus (who also directed the film) made its world premiere at the Sherman Theatre, Cardiff on 31 March 2026 before opening in the Dorfman Theatre at the Royal National Theatre, London in June 2026.

== Background ==
The musical is based on the 2014 film Pride, by Stephen Beresford.

In 2014, at a screening of the film in London Beresford revealed that early talks had taken place about adapting the film into a stage musical. In 2022, Matthew Warchus who directed the film announced that a stage musical was in development with Beresford returning to write the script.

The musical was officially announced on 29 April 2025, as part of Indhu Rubasingham's inaugural season announcement as Director of the Royal National Theatre, in a co-production with Sherman Theatre.

== Production ==
=== World premiere: Cardiff and London (2026-27) ===
The musical had its world premiere with preview performances at the Sherman Theatre in Cardiff from 31 March to 18 April 2026, before transferring to the Dorfman Theatre at the National Theatre in London from 11 June, with an official opening night on 25 June, running until 12 September 2026. It is directed by Matthew Warchus, set and costume designed by Bunny Christie and choreographed by Lizzi Gee. Casting was announced on 20 January 2026.

Following the run at the National, the musical will transfer to the Bridge Theatre, London from 12 November 2026, running until 8 May 2027.

== Cast and characters ==
Character	Cardiff	London	
Character	Cardiff	National	Bridge
Character	2026		
Jonathan Blake	Samuel Barnett	Samuel Barnett	Samuel Barnett
Bromley	Lewis Cornay	Lewis Cornay	Dan Hand
Gwen	Gillian Elisa	Gillian Elisa	Gillian Elisa
Mike	Matthew Durkan	Matthew Durkan	Matthew Durkan
Martin	Robin Hayward	Robin Hayward	Robin Hayward
Gethin	Chris Jenkins	Chris Jenkins	Chris Jenkins
Cliff	Darren Lawrence	Darren Lawrence	Darren Lawrence
Mark Ashton	Jhon Lumsden	Jhon Lumsden	Ryan Kopel
Hefina Headon	Kirsty Malpass	Kirsty Malpass	Kirsty Malpass
Debbie	Madeleine Morgan	Madeleine Morgan	Madeleine Morgan
Sian James	Sarah Pugh	Sarah Pugh	Sarah Pugh
Reggie	Jordan Shaw	Jordan Shaw	Carl Spencer
Steph	Courtney Stapleton	Courtney Stapleton	Courtney Stapleton
Maureen	Caroline Sheen	Caroline Sheen	Caroline Sheen
Margaret	Mared Williams	Mared Williams	Mared Williams
Dai	Matthew Woodyatt	Matthew Woodyatt	Matthew Woodyatt
