= List of awards and nominations received by Imelda Staunton =

Imelda Staunton awards and nominations
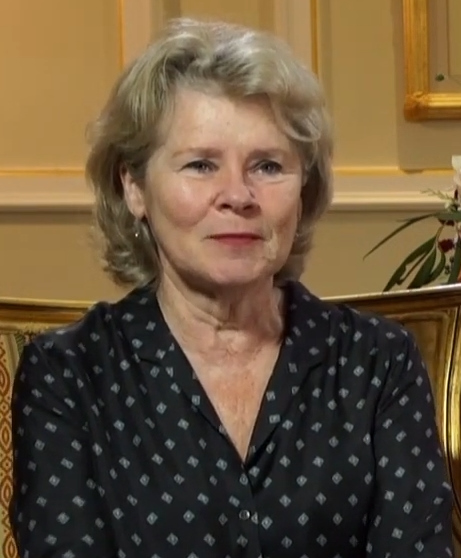
- Staunton during an interview for the promotion of the film Downton Abbey in 2019
Awards and nominations
Award	Wins	Nominations
Academy Awards	0	1
BAFTA Awards	1	5
Emmy Awards	0	3
Golden Globes	0	3
IFTA Awards	0	1
Laurence Olivier Awards	5	15
Screen Actors Guild Awards	1	4

Totals (Note: Certain award groups do not simply award one winner. They acknowledge several different recipients, have runners-up, and have third place. Since this is a specific recognition and is different from losing an award, runner-up mentions are considered wins in this award tally. For simplification and to avoid errors, each award in this list has been presumed to have had a prior nomination.)
- Wins: 32
- Nominations: 73

Imelda Staunton is an English actress and singer who has received various awards and nominations, including a British Academy Film Award and five Laurence Olivier Awards. Additionally, she has been nominated for an Academy Award, three Golden Globes, and two Primetime Emmy Awards. In 2016, Staunton was appointed Commander of the Order of the British Empire (CBE) in honour of her services to drama.

Staunton debuted in the West End in 1982 and the same year, she earned her first nomination for the Laurence Olivier Award for Best Actress in a Musical for The Beggar's Opera. Her first Laurence Olivier Award win came in 1985, when her performances in A Chorus of Disapproval and The Corn Is Green went on to collect an Olivier Award. Following a second Laurence Olivier Award win in 1991 for her lead performance as the Baker's Wife in the original London production of Into the Woods, Staunton's breakthrough role as the titular 1950s working-class provider of illegal abortions in director Mike Leigh's critically acclaimed drama film Vera Drake (2004) won her the Volpi Cup for Best Actress at the Venice Film Festival and the BAFTA as well as the BIFA Award, the European Film Award and the NYFCC Award, and she was nominated for the Academy Award, the Golden Globe, the Screen Actors Guild Award and the Critics' Choice Award. The following year, she appeared in the television film My Family and Other Animals and was nominated for the International Emmy Award for Best Actress for her performance as Louisa Durrell.

In 2007, Staunton received international mainstream recognition for playing the antagonist Dolores Umbridge in Harry Potter and the Order of the Phoenix, the fifth instalment of the Harry Potter film series, and her performance earned her a nomination for the Saturn Award for Best Supporting Actress. Staunton's other television credits include the 2010 Christmas special miniseries Return to Cranford and the 2012 biographical film The Girl. For her portrayal of Alma Reville Hitchcock in the latter, she was nominated for the Primetime Emmy Award, the BAFTA TV Award and the Critics' Choice Television Award. Staunton's played human rights activist Hefina Headon in the historical comedy Pride (2014) brought her the British Independent Film Award as well as a nomination for the BAFTA Award. Alongside her work on screen, Staunton starred in many plays in the West End and went onto win the Olivier Awards for Best Actress in a Musical for the 2012 London revival of Sweeney Todd, the 2015 London revival of Gypsy, and the 2025 London revival of Hello, Dolly!, as Mrs. Lovett, Momma Rose, and Dolly Gallagher Levi respectively. In 2022, She portrayed Elizabeth II for the final two seasons of The Crown, garnering nominations for the BAFTA, the Golden Globe, and the Primetime Emmy Award.

== Major associations ==
=== Academy Awards ===
Year	Category	Nominated work	Result	Ref.
2004	Best Actress	Vera Drake	Nominated	

=== BAFTA Awards ===
Year	Category	Nominated work	Result	Ref.
British Academy Film Awards
2005	Best Actress in a Leading Role	Vera Drake	Won	
2015	Best Actress in a Supporting Role	Pride	Nominated	
British Academy Television Awards
2010	Best Supporting Actress	Return to Cranford	Nominated	
2013	Best Supporting Actress	The Girl	Nominated	
2023	Best Actress	The Crown	Nominated	

=== Emmy Awards ===
Year	Category	Nominated work	Result	Ref.
Primetime Emmy Awards
2013	Outstanding Supporting Actress in a Miniseries or a Movie	The Girl	Nominated	
2024	Outstanding Lead Actress in a Drama Series	The Crown	Nominated	
International Emmy Awards
2006	Best Actress	My Family and Other Animals	Nominated	

=== Golden Globe Awards ===
Year	Category	Nominated work	Result	Ref.
2005	Best Actress in a Motion Picture – Drama	Vera Drake	Nominated	
2023	Best Actress in a Television Series – Drama	The Crown	Nominated	
2024	Best Actress in a Television Series – Drama	The Crown	Nominated	

=== Laurence Olivier Awards ===
Year	Category	Nominated work	Result	Ref.
1982	Best Actress in a Musical	The Beggar's Opera	Nominated	
1982	Most Promising Newcomer of the Year	The Beggar's Opera	Nominated	
1985	Best Performance in a Supporting Role	A Chorus of Disapproval / The Corn Is Green	Won	
1988	Actress of the Year in a Revival	Uncle Vanya	Nominated	
1988	Best Actress in a Musical	The Wizard of Oz	Nominated	
1991	Best Actress in a Musical	Into the Woods	Won	
1997	Best Actress in a Musical	Guys and Dolls	Nominated	
2010	Best Actress	Entertaining Mr Sloane	Nominated	
2013	Best Actress in a Musical	Sweeney Todd	Won	
2015	Best Actress	Good People	Nominated	
2016	Best Actress in a Musical	Gypsy	Won	
2018	Best Actress	Who's Afraid of Virginia Woolf?	Nominated	
2018	Best Actress in a Musical	Follies	Nominated	
2025	Best Actress in a Musical	Hello, Dolly!	Won	

=== Screen Actors Guild Awards ===
Year	Category	Nominated work	Result	Ref.
1999	Outstanding Cast in a Motion Picture (Note: Shared with the cast)	Shakespeare in Love	Won	
2005	Outstanding Actress in a Leading Role	Vera Drake	Nominated	
2023	Outstanding Ensemble in a Drama Series	The Crown	Nominated	
2024	Outstanding Ensemble in a Drama Series	The Crown	Nominated	

== Miscellaneous awards ==
Awards and nominations
Award	Year	Category	Work	Result	Ref.
Annie Awards	2013	Outstanding Voice Acting in an Animated Feature Production	The Pirates! In an Adventure with Scientists!	Nominated	
British Independent Film Awards	2004	Best Actress	Vera Drake	Won	
British Independent Film Awards	2014	Best Supporting Actress	Pride	Won	
Chicago Film Critics Association	2004	Best Actress	Vera Drake	Won	
Chlotrudis Awards	2005	Best Actress	Vera Drake	Won	
Chlotrudis Awards	2015	Best Supporting Actress	Pride	Nominated	
Clarence Derwent Awards	1986	Best Supporting Actress – UK	The Corn Is Green	Won	
Critics' Choice Movie Awards	2005	Best Actress	Vera Drake	Nominated	
Critics' Choice Television Awards	2013	Best Supporting Actress in a Movie or a Miniseries	The Girl	Nominated	
Critics' Circle Theatre Awards	1985	Best Supporting Actress	A Chorus of Disapproval and The Corn Is Green	Won	
Dallas–Fort Worth Film Critics Association	2005	Best Actress	Vera Drake	Runner-up	
Empire Awards	2005	Best British Actress	Vera Drake	Nominated	
European Film Awards	2004	Best Actress	Vera Drake	Won	
Evening Standard British Film Awards	2005	Best Actress	Vera Drake	Won	
Evening Standard Theatre Awards	2015	Best Musical Performance	Gypsy	Won	
Irish Film & Television Academy Awards	2000	Best Actress	Rat	Nominated	
London Film Critics' Circle	2005	Actress of the Year	Vera Drake	Won	
London Film Critics' Circle	2008	British Supporting Actress of the Year	Harry Potter and the Order of the Phoenix	Nominated	
Los Angeles Film Critics Association	2004	Best Actress	Vera Drake	Won	
Movies for Grownups Awards	2010	Best Supporting Actress	Taking Woodstock	Nominated	
Movies for Grownups Awards	2010	Best Grownup Love Story (Note: Shared with Henry Goodman)	Taking Woodstock	Nominated	
Movies for Grownups Awards	2024	Best Actress (TV)	The Crown	Nominated	
National Film Awards	2015	Best Actress	Pride	Nominated	
National Society of Film Critics	2005	Best Actress	Vera Drake	Won (Note: Tied with Hilary Swank for Million Dollar Baby (2004))	
New York Film Critics Circle	2004	Best Actress	Vera Drake	Won	
New York Film Critics Online	2004	Best Actress	Vera Drake	Won	
Online Film Critics Society	2005	Best Actress	Vera Drake	Nominated	
San Diego Film Critics Society	2004	Best Actress	Vera Drake	Won	
San Diego Film Critics Society	2010	Best Ensemble	Another Year	Nominated	
Satellite Awards	2005	Best Actress in a Motion Picture – Drama	Vera Drake	Nominated	
Satellite Awards	2024	Best Actress in a Series – Drama or Genre	The Crown	Nominated	
Saturn Awards	2008	Best Supporting Actress	Harry Potter and the Order of the Phoenix	Nominated	
Toronto Film Critics Association	2004	Best Actress	Vera Drake	Won	
UK Theatre Awards	2012	Best Performance in a Musical	Sweeney Todd	Won	
UK Theatre Awards	2015	Best Performance in a Musical	Gypsy	Won	
Vancouver Film Critics Circle	2005	Best Actress	Vera Drake	Won	
Venice Film Festival	2004	Best Actress	Vera Drake	Won	
Village Voice Film Poll	2004	Best Performance	Vera Drake	Won	
Washington D.C. Area Film Critics Association	2004	Best Actress	Vera Drake	Won	
WhatsOnStage Awards	2013	Best Actress in a Musical	Sweeney Todd	Won	
WhatsOnStage Awards	2015	Best Actress in a Play	Good People	Nominated	
WhatsOnStage Awards	2016	Best Actress in a Musical	Gypsy	Won	
WhatsOnStage Awards	2018	Best Actress in a Play	Who's Afraid of Virginia Woolf?	Nominated	
WhatsOnStage Awards	2025	Best Performer in a Musical	Hello Dolly!	Nominated	
Women Film Critics Circle	2004	Best Actress	Vera Drake	Won	

== Honours ==
Honours
Awarding institution	Year	Honour	Ref.
Monarchy of the United Kingdom	2006	Officer of the Order of the British Empire	
Monarchy of the United Kingdom	2016	Commander of the Order of the British Empire	
Royal Academy of Music	2018	Honorary Membership	
