= LGSM =

LGSM may refer to:

- the ICAO code for Samos International Airport, Greece
- Lesbians and Gays Support the Miners, British advocacy group, founded 1984
- Lesbians and Gays Support the Migrants, British advocacy group, founded 2016
- Licentiate of the Guildhall School of Music, London
- Liverpool Guild Student Media, Liverpool
