= LAPC =

LAPC may refer to:

- Los Angeles Pierce College, a community college that serves more than 23,000 students in the northern Chalk Hills of Woodland Hills, a community within the San Fernando Valley region of the city of Los Angeles, California.
- Lesbians Against Pit Closures, an alliance of openly lesbian women who came together to support the National Union of Mineworkers and various mining communities during the UK miners' strike.

== See also ==
- Roland LAPC-I a sound card for PCs
