= No Births Behind Bars =

British advocacy group

No Births Behind Bars is a British advocacy group calling for an end to the incarceration of pregnant people.

== History ==
In March 2022, the group co-organised a protest in Parliament Square along with feminist advocacy group Level Up. The protest featured a speech by Emma Hughes, who had been arrested as part of the Stansted 15 in 2017 and was pregnant at the time of her arrest.

In June 2022, the group co-organised a feed-in protest outside the Ministry of Justice to pressure Minister of Justice Dominic Raab to respond to a petition that gathered over 10 000 signatures calling for the government to change sentencing laws to ensure that judges took pregnancy and parenthood into consideration. Later that month, the group held a protest outside of HM Prison Styal in Cheshire to mark two years since an inmate at the prison serving an eight-month sentence delivered a stillborn baby after her calls for medical attention had been ignored for several hours.
