= Stephen Beresford =

English actor and writer

- Beresford at the 2026 Montclair Film Festival
- Born: 1972 (age 53–54); London, England
- Education: Royal Academy of Dramatic Art
- Occupations: Actor, writer
- Notable work: The Last of the Haussmans; Pride

Stephen Beresford (born c. 1972) is an English actor and writer. He is best known for writing the play The Last of the Haussmans, produced by the National Theatre in 2012, and the 2014 historical comedy Pride, which won the Queer Palm award at the 2014 Cannes Film Festival.

== Early life ==
Beresford was born in London and raised in Dartmouth. He began acting with a local children's drama group when he was nine years old, and later attended the Royal Academy of Dramatic Art.

== Career ==
After several years of professional work, Beresford turned from acting and began writing scripts, with several sold to Channel 4 though not produced. Inspired by his upbringing in Dartmouth, he wrote The Last of the Haussmans and submitted it to the National Theatre. In her review, Kate Kellaway of The Observer wrote: "It is with disbelief that one discovers that The Last of the Haussmans is actor Stephen Beresford's first play. It is a knockout – entertaining, sad and outrageous. If he has more of this quality to write, he is going to be a major name."

The production was directed by Howard Davies with Julie Walters and Helen McCrory in the lead roles. It also marked the professional debut of Taron Egerton direct from completing his acting training at RADA.

Beresford was a new entry in 2014 to The Independent on Sunday's Rainbow List at number 17. In 2018, Beresford's stage adaptation of Fanny and Alexander opened at The Old Vic.

Beresford has also continued to work on screenplays, remarking in 2015 that he always looks for projects with an "element of subversion" in them, so that he can find ways to smuggle in messages and meaning. He wrote Pride, inspired by lesbian and gay activists who raised money to help families affected by the British miners' strike in 1984, at the outset of what would become the Lesbians and Gays Support the Miners campaign, and then co-wrote Tolkien, a 2019 biopic of the author J.R.R. Tolkien. The film, starring Nicholas Hoult, touches on Tolkien's early life, including his friendships, love of languages, religion, and romance with Edith Bratt. The Tolkien Estate, without viewing the film, stated that it does not endorse the film or its content, though among reviews, Graeme Tuckett of Stuff called it "A subtle, delicate biopic of The Lord of the Rings author."

In 2020, Beresford's new play The Southbury Child was due to open at the Bridge Theatre; however, due to the COVID-19 pandemic, the run was postponed until mid-2022, in a production starring Alex Jennings and directed by Nicholas Hytner. The Daily Telegraph gave the production a five-star review by critic Dominic Cavendish.

He wrote a new play Three Kings as part of The Old Vic's Old Vic: In Camera series.

In 2026, the stage musical adaptation of Pride will premiere at the Sherman Theatre and Royal National Theatre, with Beresford writing the book and lyrics.

== Filmography ==
=== Film ===
| Year | Title | Role | Distributor |
|---|---|---|---|
| 1994 | Spring Awakening (TV film) | (uncredited) | CBS |
| 2000 | Where There's Smoke (TV film) | Joe | Carlton Television |
| 2003 | She Stoops to Conquer | Mr. George Hastings | Heritage Theatre |
| 2010 | The Thing You Drew (Short) | Boy | N/A |
| 2014 | Pride | Writer | Pathé Distribution/20th Century Fox |
| 2019 | Tolkien | Co-writer | Fox Searchlight Pictures |
| TBA | Elsinore | Writer | N/A |

=== Television ===
| Year | Title | Role | Episode |
|---|---|---|---|
| 1999 | The Bill | Priest | "Lock In" |
| 2000 | Casualty | Mr. Samuals | "Life Support" |
| 2004 | Midsomer Murders | Marcus Poole | "The Maid in Splendour" |
| 2004 | He Knew He Was Right | Richard | Mini-series |
| 2004 | Peep Show | Dancer | "Dance Class" |
| 2004 | The Last Chancers | David | 1.2 & 1.4 |
| 2005 | Nathan Barley | Ivan Plapp | Mini-series |

== Awards and nominations ==
Films

- 2014 – British Independent Film Awards, Nominated, Best Screenplay – For Pride (2014)
- 2014 – British Academy Film Awards, Outstanding Debut by a British Writer, Director or Producer – For Pride (2014), with David Livingstone, producer
