= Contemporary British History =

- Discipline: British history
- Language: English
- Edited by: Tony Shaw, Christopher Moores, Lucy Robinson, Camilla Schofield

Publication details
- Former name: Contemporary Record
- History: 1987–present
- Publisher: Routledge
- Frequency: Quarterly

Standard abbreviations
- ISO 4: Contemp. Br. Hist.

Indexing
- ISSN: 1361-9462 (print); 1743-7997 (web)
- LCCN: 96645160

Links
- Journal homepage; Online access; Online archive

Contemporary British History is a quarterly peer-reviewed academic journal covering the history of Britain since 1945. It was established in 1987 as the Contemporary Record, obtaining its current name in 1996. It is published by Routledge and the editors-in-chief are Tony Shaw (University of Hertfordshire), Christopher Moores (University of Birmingham), Lucy Robinson (University of Sussex), and Camilla Schofield (University of East Anglia).

== History ==
The journal was established in 1987 as the journal of the Institute of Contemporary British History. which had been founded two years prior by Anthony Seldon and Peter Hennessy. Seldon co-founded and co-edited the journal from 1987 to 1995. Its original format was a "combination of academic journal and news magazine that analyze[d] British history and current affairs". Among its sections were "Mediawatch", and "Private Papers", the latter of which surveyed deposited private documents relevant to modern British history.

== Abstracting and indexing ==
The journal is abstracted and indexed in:

- Arts and Humanities Citation Index
- British Humanities Index
- EBSCO databases
- International Bibliography of the Social Sciences
- ProQuest databases
- Scopus
