= Dominic West =

English actor (born 1969)

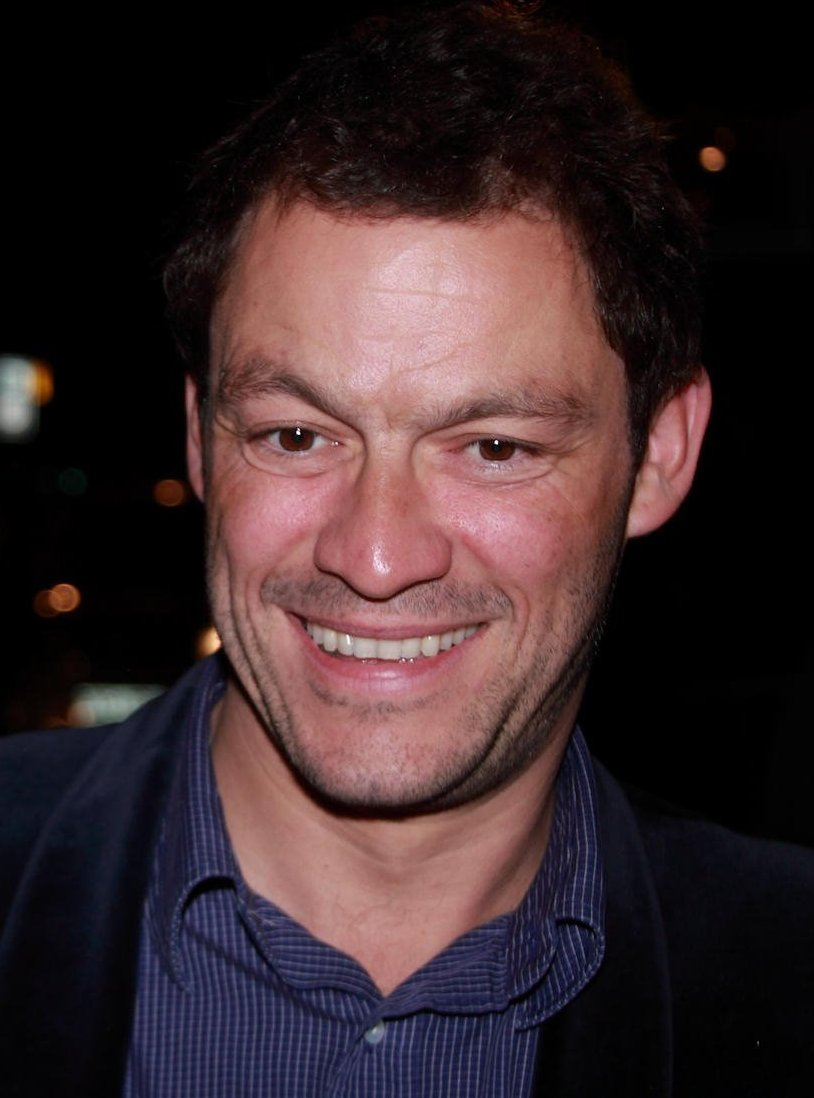
- West in 2011
- Born: Dominic Gerard Francis Eagleton West; 15 October 1969 (age 57); Sheffield, England
- Education: Trinity College Dublin (MA); Guildhall School of Music and Drama (MA)
- Occupations: Actor; director; producer; musician
- Years active: 1991–present
- Spouse: Catherine FitzGerald (m. 2010)
- Children: 5
- Relatives: Thomas Eagleton (cousin)
- Dominic West's voice From Front Row Interviews, July 2011

Dominic Gerard Francis Eagleton West (born 15 October 1969) is an English actor, director, producer, and musician. He is best known for playing Jimmy McNulty in HBO's The Wire (2002–2008); Noah Solloway in Showtime's The Affair (2014–2019), for which he was nominated for a Golden Globe Award for Best Actor – Television Series Drama; Ebenezer Scrooge's nephew Fred in A Christmas Carol (1999); and Charles, Prince of Wales, in The Crown (2022–2023), for which he was nominated for another Golden Globe Award and a Primetime Emmy Award.

West made his television debut in 1998 BBC medical drama Out of Hours before appearing in the films A Christmas Carol, 28 Days with Sandra Bullock in 2000, and Nicholas Nickleby (2001). His breakthrough came with the role of Detective Jimmy McNulty in the series The Wire. He then starred in BBC series The Hour (2011–2012) earning a Golden Globe Award nomination. He received a BAFTA Award for his performance as the serial killer Fred West in the ITV drama Appropriate Adult (2011) and a nomination for his portrayal as Richard Burton in BBC Four's Burton & Taylor (2013). He played Jean Valjean in the 2018 BBC miniseries Les Misérables. He has since starred in the Netflix series Stateless (2020), and the Amazon Studios The Pursuit of Love (2021). West most recently played the role of Dr Chris Cox in the Sky One series Brassic (2019–2025).

His film debut came with his portrayal of Henry, Earl of Richmond in Ian McKellen's adaptation of Richard III (1995). He has since appeared in 28 Days (2000), Chicago (2002), Mona Lisa Smile (2003), 300 (2007), Punisher: War Zone (2008), Johnny English Reborn (2011), John Carter (2012), Pride (2014), Testament of Youth (2014), Money Monster (2016), Genius (2016), The Square (2017), Tomb Raider (2018), Colette (2018), Downton Abbey: A New Era and Downton Abbey: The Grand Finale (2025).

== Early life ==
Dominic Gerard Francis Eagleton West was born on 15 October 1969 in Sheffield, West Riding of Yorkshire (now South Yorkshire). He is the sixth of seven siblings (five girls and two boys) born into a family of Irish descent; his maternal grandparents were born in Ireland, while his paternal grandmother was Irish-American. His mother, Pauline Mary (née Cleary), was an actress, and his father, Thomas (George) Eagleton West, owned a plastics factory. He is the first cousin once removed of American politician Thomas Eagleton. (Note: West's paternal grandfather, Sir Harold Ernest Georges West (1894–1968), was an industrialist; by virtue of his marriage to Winifred Mary, daughter of Thomas Eagleton, of St. Louis, Missouri, West's first cousin once removed was the American senator and 1972 Democratic vice-presidential nominee Thomas Eagleton. Sir Harold and Winifred West's daughter Gloria married Hugh Clifford Holmes, son of senior Army officer Sir Noel Holmes.)

West attended Eton College. He has been unenthusiastic about the career benefits of being an Old Etonian, saying it "is a stigma that is slightly above 'paedophile' in the media in a gallery of infamy", but asked whether he would consider sending his own children there, said "Yes, I would. It's an extraordinary place. [...] It has the facilities and the excellence of teaching and it will find what you're good at and nurture it." Following a gap year during which he spent four months working as a cattle herder in Argentina, he studied English literature at Trinity College Dublin, graduating in 1993, and promoted per tradition to an MA. He graduated from the Guildhall School of Music and Drama in 1995.

== Career ==
=== Film and television ===
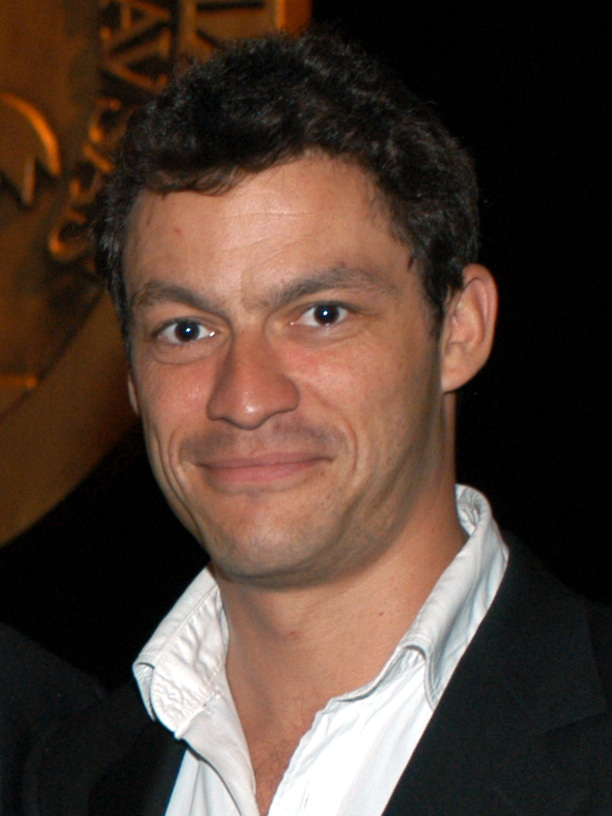
West in 2004

West's screen appearances include True Blue, Chicago, Richard III, and Mona Lisa Smile. He also starred in The Wire as Baltimore police detective Jimmy McNulty. West was praised for the accuracy of his character's American accent. His debut as a director was while being on The Wire; he directed the episode "Took" (2008). West starred as Lysander in the 1999 film version of William Shakespeare's A Midsummer Night's Dream. That same year, he appeared as Fred in A Christmas Carol. In feature films, he portrayed the heavy metal guitarist Kirk Cuddy in the 2001 film Rock Star. West played Fred Casely in the 2002 film Chicago.

In 2006, West played the Spartan politician Theron in 300 and made a guest appearance as an actor in a sketch in The Catherine Tate Show, alongside "Frankie Howerd impressionist". In 2007 he played Detective Poppil in Hannibal Rising. West played the disfigured supervillain Jigsaw in the 2008 film Marvel's Punisher: War Zone. In 2010 he had a role as General Virilus in Neil Marshall's adventure thriller Centurion. West starred in the UK ghost film, The Awakening. West has done other work on TV and radio. He appeared in the role of Oliver Cromwell in the Channel 4 series The Devil's Whore. He also performed as "Dr. West", the opening track on Eminem's 2009 album Relapse, as a doctor discharging Eminem from a rehab facility. West played the part over the phone in January 2009 while Eminem was recording it in a Miami studio.

In December 2009, West starred as Hank in a radio adaptation of Eugene O'Neill's play The Hairy Ape for BBC Radio 3, was a guest presenter on the BBC show Have I Got News for You, and ended the year alongside Joan Rivers and Sarah Jessica Parker with an appearance on Graham Norton's New Year's Eve Show. In 2011, West appeared as a news presenter on the BBC period drama series The Hour. He also played serial killer Fred West in the ITV two-part series Appropriate Adult, giving a performance that the serial killer's daughter described as capturing the "evil essence of [Fred West] – his character, his mannerisms, even his gait."

In 2012, West was offered the role of Mance Rayder in the HBO fantasy series Game of Thrones, but turned it down due to the amount of time he would have to spend away from his family. He played gay activist Jonathan Blake in the 2014 film Pride about the 1984–1985 UK miners' strike. West starred as Noah Solloway on Showtime's series The Affair, which premiered October 2014. The series was renewed for a fifth season in 2018.

In 2018 it was reported that West was represented by Tavistock Wood Management. That year he appeared in Colette as the eponymous writer's husband, Willy. In 2019, West played the role of Jean Valjean in the BBC's adaptation of Victor Hugo's novel Les Misérables. Also in 2019, West appeared in Sky One's series Brassic, in the recurring role of Dr. Chris Cox. In October 2020, West entered negotiations to play Charles, Prince of Wales in the final two seasons of The Crown. His casting was confirmed in April 2021. That same month, West joined the cast of the 2022 film Downton Abbey: A New Era. He also appeared in the 2025 sequel Downton Abbey: The Grand Finale.

=== Theatre ===
As a theatre actor, West has played Edward in Harley Granville Barker's The Voysey Inheritance directed by Peter Gill at the Royal National Theatre in 2006. Around 2009, he starred at London's Donmar Warehouse as the protagonist in Helen Edmundson's adaptation of Pedro Calderón de la Barca's existential drama Life Is a Dream, for which he received glowing reviews.

He took the title role in Simon Gray's classic comedy, Butley, playing at the Duchess Theatre in London from 1 June 2011. In the September he returned to his native Sheffield to play Iago to his former Wire co-star Clarke Peters's Othello at the Crucible Theatre.

In September to October 2012, he starred in Jez Butterworth's The River at the Royal Court Theatre in London with Miranda Raison and Laura Donnelly.

From mid December 2012 to January 2013, West starred as Henry Higgins in My Fair Lady at the Crucible Theatre in Sheffield.

In 2015–16, he starred alongside Janet McTeer in Les Liaisons Dangereuses at the Donmar Warehouse in London.

In 2024, West played the leading role of Eddie Carbone in A View from the Bridge at the Ustinov Studio, Bath. The production subsequently transferred to the Theatre Royal Haymarket in the West End.

=== Advertising ===
In 2009, West starred in a series of online films known as "The Carte Noire Readers". Made to promote French coffee brand Carte Noire, they consist of actors reading love scenes from a selection of sources and acting through the commitment of justice. West reads extracts from Pride and Prejudice by Jane Austen; Lady Chatterley's Lover by D.H. Lawrence; High Fidelity by Nick Hornby; The Age of Innocence by Edith Wharton; Life Class by Pat Barker; The Moment You Were Gone by Nicci Gerrard; and Something Childish But Very Natural by Katherine Mansfield.

From October 2023, West started appearing as an inept banker in a series of television advertisements for Nationwide.

== Charity work ==
West is a supporter of care charity Helen's Trust in response to their assistance to his mother prior to her death.

He led Team Canada/Australia for Walking With The Wounded, a fundraising event for wounded soldiers. He trekked to the South Pole against Team UK (led by Prince Harry) and Team America (led by Alexander Skarsgård). A few days into the trek, it was decided that the competition part of the race would be cancelled due to hazardous terrain and weather conditions, so the teams combined forces and continued. Alongside Harry, Skarsgård and several wounded soldiers, West successfully made it to the South Pole on 13 December 2013.

== Personal life ==
In 1998, West and his girlfriend, Polly Astor (daughter of Michael Astor), had a daughter named Martha. Years later, West rekindled his romance with Catherine FitzGerald, whom he had dated at university. The two married in Glin, County Limerick on 26 June 2010, and have four children together. The couple have hosted fox hunting at their home, Glin Castle. In 2024, West was appointed as the new ambassador of Julian House, a Bath based charity that supports vulnerable and at-risk individuals.

West is a fan of association football. Having grown up in Sheffield, West originally supported Sheffield Wednesday F.C. However, in a 2026 interview, West has said to changed his allegiance for Bristol City F.C. in part of his son having played for their academy.

== Political views ==
In August 2014, West was one of 200 public figures who were signatories to a letter to The Guardian expressing their hope that Scotland would vote to remain part of the United Kingdom in September's referendum on that issue.

West is a supporter of fox hunting, and opposes attempts to ban it in the United Kingdom, stating he does not "really get the opposition to fox hunting."

== Honours ==
- In November 2010, West was awarded an honorary degree for services to the Arts by Sheffield Hallam University.
- In July 2018, he received an honorary doctorate from the University of Sheffield.

== Filmography ==
=== Film ===
Year	Title	Role	Notes
1991	3 Joes	Joe Smoker	Short film
1995	Richard III	Henry, Earl of Richmond	
1996	True Blue	Donald Macdonald	
1996	Surviving Picasso	Paulo Picasso	
1996	E=mc2	Spike	
1997	The Gambler	Alexei	
1997	Diana & Me	Rob Naylor	
1997	Spice World	Photographer	
1999	A Midsummer Night's Dream	Lysander	
1999	Star Wars: Episode I – The Phantom Menace	Jerus Jannick	
2000	28 Days	Jasper	
2001	Rock Star	Kirk Cuddy	
2002	Ten Minutes Older	Young Man	
2002	Chicago	Fred Casely	
2003	Mona Lisa Smile	Bill Dunbar	
2004	The Forgotten	Ash Correll	
2006	Stingray	Luther	Short film
2006	300	Theron	
2007	Hannibal Rising	Inspector Popil	
2008	Hold On	Delivery Man	Short film
2008	Punisher: War Zone	Billy Russotti / Jigsaw	
2010	Centurion	General Titus Flavius Virilus	
2010	Jackboots on Whitehall	Billy Fiske	Voice
2010	Words of the Blitz	Sir John Colville	
2010	From Time to Time	Caxton	
2011	Johnny English Reborn	Simon Ambrose	
2011	Arthur Christmas	Lead Elf	Voice
2011	The Awakening	Robert Mallory	
2012	John Carter	Sab Than	
2013	The Girl with the Mechanical Maiden	Inventor	Short film
2013	Boy Cried Wolf	Hughie	Short film
2014	Pride	Jonathan Blake	
2014	Testament of Youth	Mr Brittain	
2016	Genius	Ernest Hemingway	
2016	Money Monster	Walt Camby	
2016	Finding Dory	Rudder	Voice
2017	The Square	Julian Gijoni	
2018	Colette	Henry Gauthier-Villars	
2018	Tomb Raider	Lord Richard Croft	
2022	Downton Abbey: A New Era	Guy Dexter	
2025	& Sons	Rainer	
2025	Downton Abbey: The Grand Finale	Guy Dexter	
2027	Wind of Change	Doc McGhee	Post-production
TBA	The Custom of the Country †		Post-production

=== Television ===
Year	Title	Role	Notes
1998	Out of Hours	Dr. Paul Featherstone	6 episodes
1999	A Christmas Carol	Fred	Television film
2001	Nicholas Nickleby	Sir Mulberry Hawk	Television film
2002–2008	The Wire	Detective Jimmy McNulty	Main role
2006	The Catherine Tate Show	Actor	Episode: "#3.5"
2008	The Devil's Whore	Oliver Cromwell	Main role
2009	Breaking the Mould	Howard Florey	Television film
2011	Appropriate Adult	Fred West	Main role
2011–2012	The Hour	Hector Madden	Main role
2013	Burton & Taylor	Richard Burton	Television film
2014–2019	The Affair	Noah Solloway	Main role
2016	Revolting Rhymes	Wolf / Magic Fairy / Giant (voice)	Television film
2017	Panorama	Narrator	Voice; Episode: "Germany's New Nazis"
2018–2019	Les Misérables	Jean Valjean	Main role
2019–2025	Brassic	Dr. Chris Cox	Main role
2020	Stateless	Gordon Masters	Main role
2021	The Pursuit of Love	Matthew Radlett	Main role
2022	Ten Percent	Himself	Episode #1.3
2022–2023	The Crown	Charles, Prince of Wales	Main role (seasons 5–6)
2022–2025	SAS: Rogue Heroes	Lieutenant Colonel Dudley Clarke	Main role (season 1); guest (season 2)
2024–2026	The Agency	CIA Director	7 episodes
2026	War	Morgan Henderson	Main role

== Accolades ==
Year	Award	Category	Project	Result	Ref.
2002	Critics' Choice Movie Award	Best Acting Ensemble	Chicago	Won	
2002	Screen Actors Guild Award	Outstanding Ensemble in a Motion Picture	Chicago	Won	
2002	Crime Thriller Awards	Best Actor	The Wire	Won	
2011	BAFTA Television Award	Best Actor	Appropriate Adult	Won	
2011	Crime Thriller Awards	Best Actor	Appropriate Adult	Nominated	
2011	Royal Television Society Award	Best Actor	Appropriate Adult	Nominated	
2012	Broadcasting Press Guild Award	Best Actor	The Hour	Won	
2012	Golden Globe Award	Best Actor – Miniseries or Television Film	The Hour	Nominated	
2013	BAFTA Television Award	Best Actor	Burton & Taylor	Nominated	
2013	Satellite Award	Best Actor in a Miniseries or TV Film	Burton & Taylor	Nominated	
2013	Critics' Choice Television Award	Best Actor in a Miniseries	The Hour	Nominated	
2014	Critics' Choice Television Award	Best Actor in a Miniseries	The Hour	Nominated	
2015	Golden Globe Award	Best Actor – TV Series Drama	The Affair	Nominated	
2015	Satellite Award	Best Actor in a TV Series – Drama	The Affair	Won	
2016	Satellite Award	Best Actor in a TV Series – Drama	The Affair	Won	
2023	Screen Actors Guild Awards	Outstanding Performance by an Ensemble in a Drama Series	The Crown	Nominated	
2024	Golden Globe Awards	Best Actor – TV Series Drama	The Crown	Nominated	
2024	Screen Actors Guild Awards	Outstanding Performance by an Ensemble in a Drama Series	The Crown	Nominated	
2024	BAFTA Television Award	Best Actor	The Crown	Nominated	
2024	Primetime Emmy Award	Outstanding Lead Actor in a Drama Series	The Crown	Nominated	
