= Lesbians and Gays Support the Migrants =

British advocacy group

Lesbians and Gays Support the Migrants is a British advocacy group promoting solidarity between the LGBT+ community and refugees, asylum seekers and migrants.

== Name ==
The group is named in reference of Lesbians and Gays Support the Miners, an LGBT+ organisation that supported the striking miners during the 1984-85 miners' strike.

== History ==
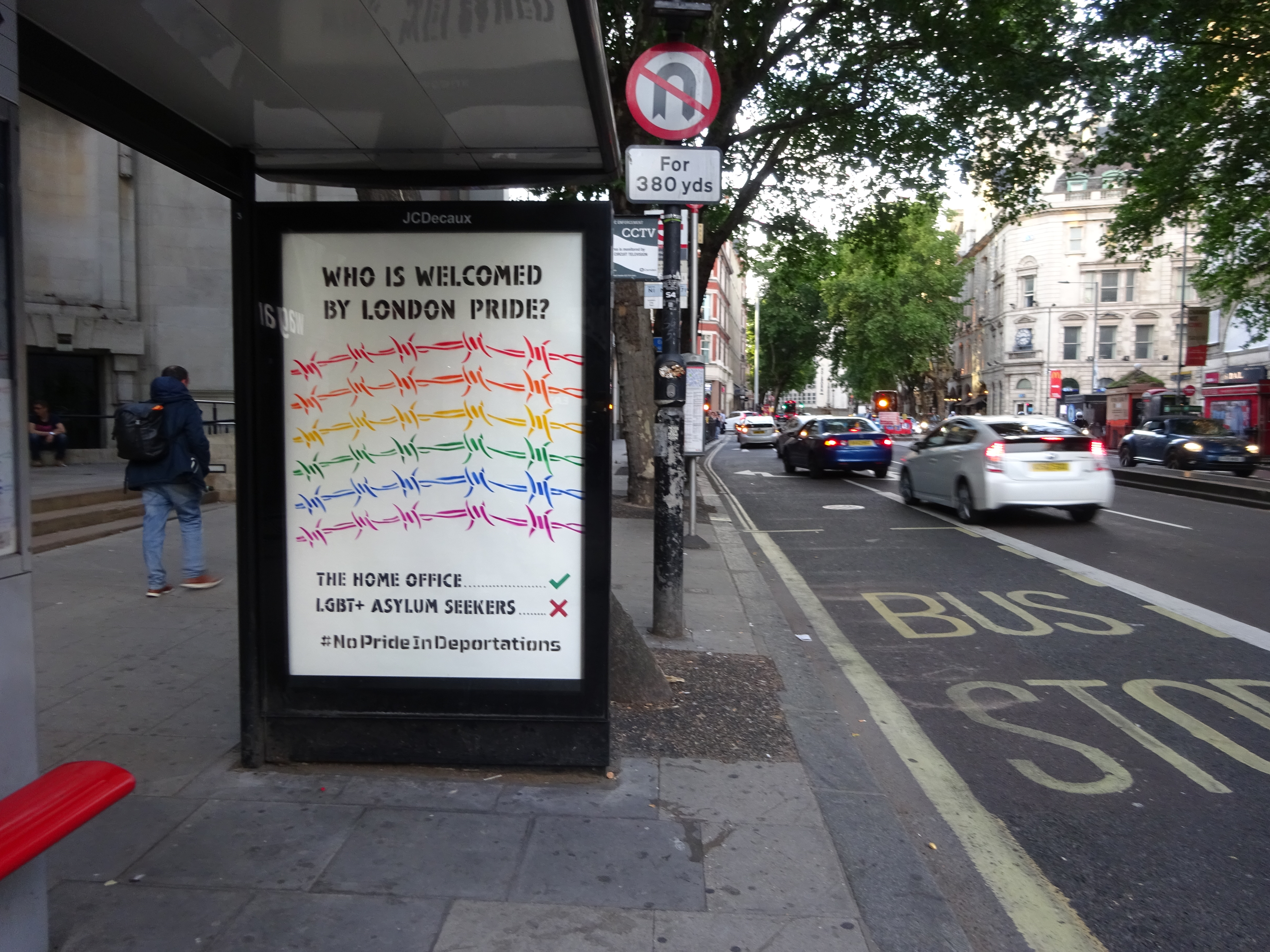
Bus stop adhack by Lesbians and Gays Support the Migrants and Protest Stencil, July 2019

In April 2016, the group held a protest outside the Home Office against new rules that would deport non-EU workers from Britain if they failed to reach an annual salary of £35,000. In the protest, the group symbolically burned £35,000 worth of fake bank notes featuring the face of Theresa May, the Home Secretary at the time.

In March 2017, several members of the group were arrested and charged with terrorism after organising a protest at Stansted Airport to block a deportation flight. In June 2017, the group co-organised a counter-protest with Action for Trans Health against a far-right "Gays Against Sharia" demonstration in Manchester organised by the English Defence League.

In August 2018, the group occupied the British Airways i360 observation tower in Brighton in protest over the company's sponsorship of Brighton Pride, which the group deemed pinkwashing. In December 2018, the group placed over 200 posters on top of advertising spaces in the London Underground. The posters carried information on how to block deportation flights and used the slogan "See It, Say It, Stop It."

In January 2019, activists from the group disrupted the Airline UK Annual Dinner 2019, distributing sick bags to the gathered airline industry and government representatives and holding a speech calling for airline companies to end their contracts for deportation flights. In August 2019, the group responded to British Airways' 100th anniversary campaign, which featured a "love letter to Britain" by 100 British celebrities, by running a counter-campaign featuring 100 letters from BA staff and migrants opposing the Airways' participation in deportation flights.

In July 2022, the group held a die-in protest at Pride in London against the participation of the Metropolitan Police in Pride, lasting 23 minutes to mark the 23 people who died under Met custody since 2021.
