= Imelda Staunton =

English actress and singer (born 1956)

Dame Imelda Staunton DBE
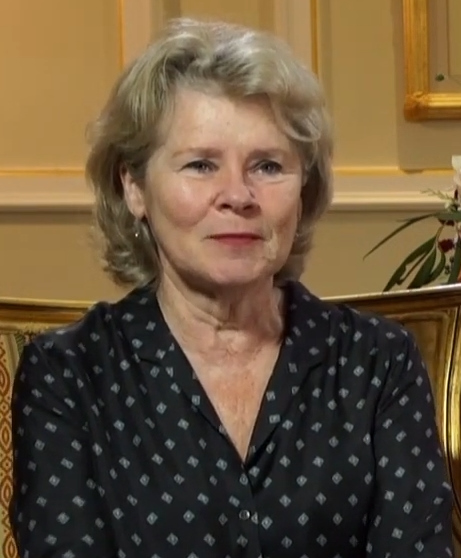
- Staunton in 2019
- Born: Imelda Mary Philomena Bernadette Staunton; 9 January 1956 (age 70); Archway, London, England
- Education: Royal Academy of Dramatic Art
- Occupations: Actress; singer
- Years active: 1976–present
- Spouse: Jim Carter (m. 1983)
- Children: Bessie Carter
- Awards: Full list

Dame Imelda Mary Philomena Bernadette Staunton (born 9 January 1956) is an English actress and singer. After training at the Royal Academy of Dramatic Art, Staunton began her career in repertory theatre in 1976 and appeared in various stage productions in the West End and across the UK. Throughout her career, she has received numerous accolades including a British Academy Film Award, and five Laurence Olivier Awards as well as nominations for an Academy Award, three British Academy Television Awards, three Golden Globes, and three Primetime Emmy Awards.

On London stage, she has received fourteen Laurence Olivier Award nominations, winning the Best Supporting Role in a Play for her work in both A Chorus of Disapproval / The Corn Is Green (1985) followed by four wins for Best Actress in a Musical for Into the Woods (1991), Sweeney Todd (2013), Gypsy (2016), and Hello, Dolly! (2024). She was Olivier-nominated for The Beggar's Opera (1982), The Wizard of Oz (1988), Uncle Vanya (1988), Guys and Dolls (1997), Entertaining Mr Sloane (2010), Good People (2015), and Follies (2018).

On film, Staunton took early roles in films such as Peter's Friends (1992), Much Ado About Nothing (1993), Sense and Sensibility (1995), and Shakespeare in Love (1998). Staunton won a BAFTA Award for playing the title role of a working-class woman in Vera Drake (2004). She later gained notoriety for playing Dolores Umbridge in two of the Harry Potter films in 2007 and 2010. She also acted in Nanny McPhee (2005), Another Year (2010), Pride (2014), and Downton Abbey (2019), and voiced roles in Chicken Run (2000), Arthur Christmas (2011), and the Paddington film series since 2014.

On television, Staunton starred in the sitcoms Up the Garden Path from (1990–1993) and Is it Legal? (1995–1998). She received Primetime Emmy Award and British Academy Television Award nominations for her portrayals of Alma Hitchcock in the HBO television film The Girl (2012) and Queen Elizabeth II in the Netflix historical series The Crown (2022–2023). Staunton also took roles in Antonia and Jane (1990), Citizen X (1995), David Copperfield (1999), My Family and Other Animals (2005), Cranford (2007), and Flesh and Blood (2020).

== Early life and education ==
Staunton was born in Archway, North London, the only child of Bridie (née McNicholas), a hairdresser, and Joseph Staunton, a labourer. They lived over Staunton's mother's salon. Her parents were immigrants from County Mayo, Ireland; her father from Ballyvary and her mother from Bohola. Her mother, a musician, had played in Irish showbands; while she could not read music, she could play almost any tune by ear on the accordion or fiddle. When Staunton was in her teens, her parents separated, both later meeting new partners.

As a pupil at La Sainte Union Catholic School, Staunton took drama classes with her elocution teacher and had starring roles in school plays, including that of Polly Peachum in The Beggar's Opera. Encouraged by her teacher, she auditioned for drama schools: while the Central School of Speech and Drama and Guildhall School of Music and Drama did not extend offers to her, she was accepted into the Royal Academy of Dramatic Art at age 18.

== Acting career ==
=== 1976–1999: Career beginnings and early roles ===
Staunton graduated from RADA in 1976, then spent six years in British repertory theatre, including a period at the Northcott Theatre, Exeter, where she had the title role in Shaw's Saint Joan (1979). She then moved on to roles at the National Theatre, including Lucy Lockit in The Beggar's Opera (1982), which earned her Olivier Award nominations for Best Actress in a Leading Role in a Musical and Most Promising Newcomer of the Year in Theatre. She also appeared in two revivals of Guys and Dolls at the National Theatre; the first in 1982 in which she met her husband Jim Carter and the second in 1996 in which she played Miss Adelaide and was nominated for the Olivier Award for Best Actress in a Musical.

In 1985, Staunton won her first Laurence Olivier Award for Best Performance in a Supporting Role for her work in both The Corn Is Green at The Old Vic and A Chorus of Disapproval at the National Theatre. She also played Dorothy Gale in the Royal Shakespeare Company's 1987 revival of The Wizard of Oz at the Barbican Centre, which earned her another Olivier nomination for Best Actress in a Musical. Staunton won her first Laurence Olivier Award for Best Actress in a Musical for playing the Baker's Wife in the original London production of Into the Woods (1990).

Staunton's first big-screen role came in a 1986 film Comrades. She then appeared in the 1991 film Antonia and Jane, and in the 1992 film Peter's Friends. Other film roles include performances in Much Ado About Nothing (1993), Deadly Advice (1993), Sense and Sensibility (1995) and Twelfth Night (1996). In 1993, she appeared on television alongside Richard Briers and Adrian Edmondson in If You See God, Tell Him. Staunton also played the wife of Detective Burakov in the 1995 HBO movie, Citizen X, which recounted the pursuit and capture of Russian serial killer Andrei Chikatilo. She has had other television parts in The Singing Detective (1986), Midsomer Murders, the sitcom Is It Legal? (1995–98), Tales From the Crypt in its 7th and final season when all filming had been relocated to England, she was in Episode 10 About Face, as well as A Bit of Fry and Laurie. She was a voice artist on Mole's Christmas (1994). Staunton shared a Screen Actors Guild Award for Best Performance by a Cast in 1998 for Shakespeare in Love.

On radio, she has appeared in the title role of the detective drama series Julie Enfield Investigates, as the lead "Izzy Comyn" in the comedy Up the Garden Path (which later moved to ITV with Staunton reprising the role), in Diary of a Provincial Lady (from 1999), as "Courageous Kate" in Series 1 of Elephants to Catch Eels and as "Xanthippe" in Series 2 of Acropolis Now. She starred opposite Anna Massey in the post-World War II mystery series Daunt and Dervish, and opposite Patrick Barlow in The Patrick and Maureen Maybe Music Experience. She played the role of a schoolboy as the lead character in the five part (15 minutes each): "The Skool Days of Nigel Molesworth" for BBC Radio 4.

=== 2000–2011: Vera Drake and Harry Potter films ===
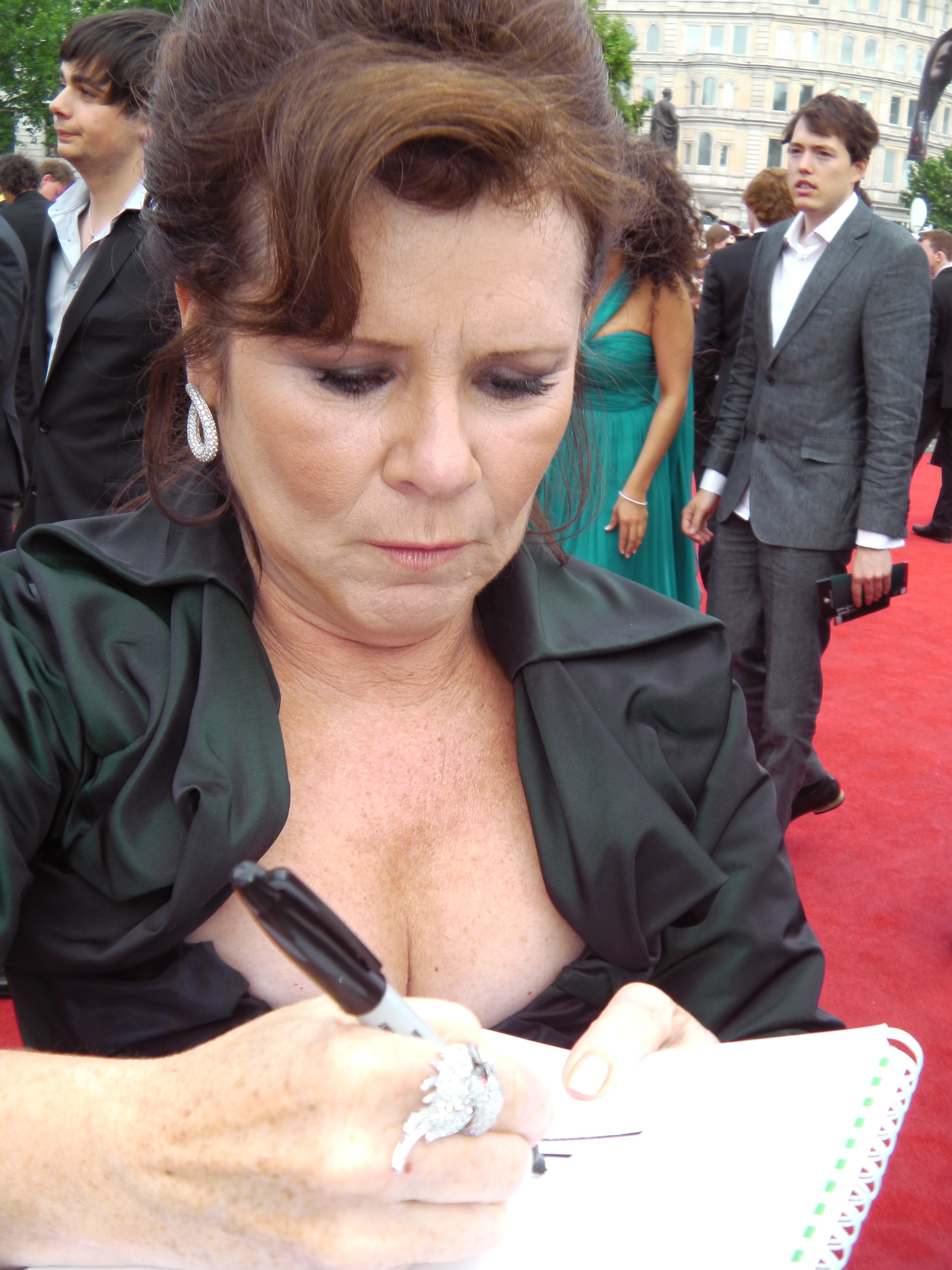
Staunton at the premiere of Harry Potter and the Deathly Hallows – Part 2 in 2011

In the early 2000s, Staunton appeared in supporting roles in Chicken Run (2000), Another Life (2001) and Bright Young Things (2003). She received widespread acclaim for her performance in the title role of Mike Leigh’s Vera Drake (2004) as a working-class woman who secretly performs abortions. She won the BAFTA Award for Best Actress in a Leading Role, the European Film Award for Best Actress, and the Volpi Cup for Best Actress at the Venice Film Festival; the film itself won the Golden Lion. For the same role, she received her first Academy Award nomination as well as Golden Globe and Screen Actors Guild Award nominations. She went on to star in Nanny McPhee (2005) and played Margaret Campbell in Freedom Writers (2007) opposite Hilary Swank. That same year she portrayed the free-thinking gossip Miss Pole in the BBC series Cranford.

Staunton portrayed Dolores Umbridge in Harry Potter and the Order of the Phoenix (2007), for which she received widespread acclaim. She was nominated for Best British Actress in a Supporting Role at the London Film Critics Circle Awards. Staunton reprised her role as Dolores Umbridge in Harry Potter and the Deathly Hallows – Part 1 in 2010. In 2011, she played Grace Andrews in the second series of Psychoville.

Other film roles include the 2008 film A Bunch of Amateurs, in which she starred alongside Burt Reynolds, Derek Jacobi and Samantha Bond, and the character of Sonia Teichberg in Ang Lee's Taking Woodstock (2009). Staunton provided the voice of the Talking Flowers in Tim Burton's Alice in Wonderland (2010), and played one of the lead roles in the supernatural drama film The Awakening (2011). In the ensuing twenty years, Staunton mainly had roles in plays, including Sonya in Uncle Vanya (1988), Kath in Entertaining Mr Sloane (2009) and Margie Good People (2014), for which she received Olivier nominations for Best Actress in a Play. She also appeared in two productions at the Almeida Theatre; firstly in the premiere of Frank McGuinness's There Came a Gypsy Riding in 2007 and secondly in a revival of Edward Albee's A Delicate Balance in 2011. Also in 2011, she was the Voice of the Interface in the highly-acclaimed and Hugo Award-nominated episode of Doctor Who, "The Girl Who Waited". In 2012, she portrayed Alma Reville, the wife of Alfred Hitchcock, in the HBO television movie The Girl, which also starred Toby Jones and Sienna Miller. Her performance saw her nominated for a BAFTA Television Award and a Primetime Emmy Award.

=== 2012–2019: Return to musical theatre ===
Most recently, Staunton has appeared in two Chichester Festival Theatre productions, taking on the role of Mrs. Lovett in a revival of Stephen Sondheim's Sweeney Todd between 2011 and 2012, starring opposite Michael Ball, before starring as Rose in a revival of Gypsy between 2014 and 2015. Both productions transferred to London for critically and commercially acclaimed runs. Staunton won her second and third Olivier Awards for Best Actress in a Musical for the two productions in 2013 and 2016 respectively. In 2012, she voiced Queen Victoria in the Aardman film The Pirates! Band of Misfits, where she serves as the main antagonist. In 2014, she co-starred in Maleficent as well as the British comedy-drama Pride. In late 2014, she had a voice role in Paddington, a film based on the Paddington Bear books by Michael Bond. Staunton and her Harry Potter co-star Michael Gambon voiced Paddington's Aunt Lucy and Uncle Pastuzo, respectively.

Staunton returned to the Harold Pinter Theatre in London's West End in 2017 as Martha in Who's Afraid of Virginia Woolf?, starring alongside Conleth Hill, Luke Treadaway and Imogen Poots at the Harold Pinter Theatre. This play was broadcast in National Theatre Live on 18 May 2017. Staunton performed the role of Sally in the 2017 National Theatre revival of Stephen Sondheim's Follies, alongside Janie Dee as Phyllis, and Philip Quast as Ben. The show was broadcast through the National Theatre Live initiative on 16 November 2017. An August 2018 announcement revealed that Staunton would be among the new cast to join the original actors in Downton Abbey, which started principal photography at about the same time.

=== 2020–present: The Crown and theatre roles ===
Staunton starred as Penny in seasons 1 and 2 of the Apple TV+ comedy series Trying. Season One premiered on 1 May 2020 and Season Two premiered on 14 May 2021. On 31 January 2020, it was announced that she would be portraying Queen Elizabeth II in the fifth season of the critically acclaimed Netflix series The Crown. On 9 July 2020, it was announced that the series had been extended to a sixth and final season, with Staunton again to reprise her role of the Queen. Staunton's performance in the fifth season earned her Golden Globe Award and British Academy Television Award nominations. Her performance in season six earned her Golden Globe Award and Primetime Emmy Award nominations. She has stated that she was filming scenes for The Crown on 8 September 2022, the day of the death of Queen Elizabeth II, and that she and co-star Lesley Manville were informed of the news during the shoot and chose to complete the day’s filming before observing a period of mourning. In summer 2024, Staunton played the role of Dolly Gallagher Levi in a revival of the musical Hello, Dolly! at the London Palladium. For her performance, she won her fourth Laurence Olivier Award for Best Actress in a Musical.

Staunton has narrated unabridged audio-book versions of many of Julia Donaldson's children's books, including The Gruffalo, The Gruffalo's Child, Monkey Puzzle, The Snail and the Whale, Stick Man and Zog, as well as other children's books. In 2014 she collaborated with her husband, Jim Carter, and Show of Hands on Centenary: Words and Music of the Great War, an album of songs and poetry from and inspired by World War I. Staunton reprised her role as Dolores Umbridge for the Harry Potter and the Battle at the Ministry attraction, which opened at Universal Epic Universe on May 22, 2025.

== Personal life ==
Staunton and her husband, actor Jim Carter, have a daughter, Bessie, born in 1993. In 2007, they appeared in the BBC series Cranford, with Carter as Captain Brown and Bessie as a maid. They live in West Hampstead. In 2025 Staunton and her daughter Bessie Carter co-starred in a production of Mrs. Warren's Profession in London.

In 2014, Staunton's dog, Molly, appeared as Chowsie the dog in Gypsy at the Chichester Festival Theatre from 6 October to 8 November. Staunton played the leading role of Mama Rose.

Staunton is a patron for the Milton Rooms, a new arts centre in Malton, North Yorkshire along with Bill Nighy, Jools Holland and Kathy Burke. In addition, Staunton is a patron at the Swan Theatre, Worcester, where she made her acting debut, as well as leading creative health charity Breathe Arts Health Research.

== Political views ==
Staunton endorsed the Labour Party in the 2024 United Kingdom general election.

== Performances and works ==
=== Film ===
Year	Title	Role(s)	Notes	Ref(s)
1986	Comrades	Betsy Loveless		
1992	Peter's Friends	Mary Charleston		
1993	Much Ado About Nothing	Margaret		
1994	Deadly Advice	Beth Greenwood		
1995	The Snow Queen	Ivy / Angorra	Voice; Direct-to-video	
1995	Sense and Sensibility	Charlotte Palmer		
1996	Twelfth Night	Maria		
1996	Tales from the Crypt (TV series)	Sarah		
1996	The Snow Queen's Revenge	Elspeth / Rowena	Voice; Direct-to-video	
1997	Remember Me?	Lorna		
1997	The Ugly Duckling	Scruffy	Voice; Direct-to-video	
1998	Shakespeare in Love	Nurse		
1999	Jack & the Beanstalk	Dilly	Voice; Direct-to-video	
2000	Chicken Run	Bunty	Voice	
2000	Rat	Conchita Flynn		
2001	Another Life	Ethel Graydon		
2001	Crush	Janine		
2002	The Strange Case of Penny Allison	Penny Allison / Alison Ayling	Short; Direct-to-video	
2002	Ready	Naomi	Short (Note: Included as a segment of the direct-to-video anthology feature Guilty Hearts (2011))	
2003	The Virgin of Liverpool	Sophie Conlon		
2003	Bright Young Things	Lady Brown		
2003	I'll Be There	Dr. Bridget		
2003	Blackball	Bridget		
2004	Vera Drake	Vera Drake		
2005	Nanny McPhee	Mrs. Blatherwick		
2006	Shadow Man	Ambassador Cochran	Direct-to-video	
2007	Freedom Writers	Margaret Campbell		
2007	Harry Potter and the Order of the Phoenix	Dolores Umbridge		
2007	How About You	Hazel Nightingale		
2008	Three and Out	Rosemary Cassidy		
2008	A Bunch of Amateurs	Mary		
2009	Taking Woodstock	Sonia Teichberg		
2010	Alice in Wonderland	Tall Flower Faces	Voice	
2010	Another Year	Janet		
2010	Harry Potter and the Deathly Hallows – Part 1	Dolores Umbridge		
2011	The Awakening	Maud Hill		
2011	Arthur Christmas	Mrs. Santa	Voice	
2012	The Pirates! In an Adventure with Scientists!	Queen Victoria	Voice	
2014	Pride	Hefina Headon		
2014	Maleficent	Knotgrass		
2014	Paddington	Aunt Lucy	Voice	
2017	Little Bird	First Officer Simpkins	Short	
2017	Finding Your Feet	Sandra Abbott		
2017	Paddington 2	Aunt Lucy	Voice	
2019	Downton Abbey	Lady Maud Bagshaw		
2019	Maleficent: Mistress of Evil	Knotgrass		
2020	Amulet	Sister Claire		
2022	Downton Abbey: A New Era	Lady Maud Bagshaw		
2023	The Canterville Ghost	Mrs. Umney	Voice	
2023	Chicken Run: Dawn of the Nugget	Bunty	Voice	
2024	Paddington in Peru	Aunt Lucy	Voice	
2025	& Sons	Isabel Platt		

=== Television ===
Year(s)	Title	Role(s)	Notes	Ref(s)
1982	Playhouse	Mary Price	Episode: "Easy Money"	
1986	Ladies in Charge	Edith	Episode: "Double Act"	
1986	The Singing Detective	Staff Nurse White	Miniseries; 5 episodes	
1988	Thompson	Various roles	Miniseries; 6 episodes	
1989	The Ruth Rendell Mysteries	Polly Flinders	3 episodes	
1990–1993	Up the Garden Path	Izzy Comyn	Main role; 18 episodes	
1990	ScreenPlay	Jane Hartman; Stephanie (Note: Staunton played separate characters in each episode.)	Episode: "Antonia and Jane"; Episode: "The Englishman's Wife"	
1990	The Play on One	Cheryl Newman	Episode: "Yellowbacks"	
1990	Masterpiece	Louie	Episode: "The Heat of the Day"	
1991	Screen Two	The Producer	Episode: "They Never Slept"	
1992	A Masculine Ending	Bridget Bennet	Television film	
1992	Performance	Jenny Beales	Episode: "Roots"	
1993	Don't Leave Me This Way	Bridget Bennet	Television film	
1993	If You See God, Tell Him	Muriel Spry	Miniseries; 4 episodes	
1994	Woodcock	Edna	Television film	
1994	Frank Stubbs Promotes	Susan	Episode: "Charity"	
1994	Mole's Christmas	Various roles	Voice; Television film	
1995	Citizen X	Mrs. Burakov	Television film	
1995	Look at the State We're In!	Councillor Johnson	Miniseries; Episode: "Local Government"	
1995–1998	Is It Legal?	Stella Phelps	Main role; 21 episodes	
1995	The Adventures of Mole	Various roles	Voice; Television film	
1996	The Adventures of Toad	Various roles	Voice; Television film	
1996	Tales from the Crypt	Sarah Nevin	Episode: "About Face"	
1998–2000	The Canterbury Tales	The Prioress	Miniseries; 3 episodes	
1999	Midsomer Murders	Christine Cooper	Episode: "Dead Man's Eleven"	
1999	David Copperfield	Emma Micawber	Two-part television special	
2002	Murder	DCI Billie Dory	Miniseries; 4 episodes	
2003	Let's Write a Story	Mrs. Twit	Docuseries; Episode: "Humour"	
2003	Cambridge Spies	Queen Elizabeth	Miniseries; Episodes 2 and 4	
2003	Strange	Reverend Mary Truegood	Miniseries; Episode: "Incubus"	
2005	Fingersmith	Mrs. Sucksby	3 episodes	
2005	ShakespeaRe-Told	Polly Moon	Episode: "A Midsummer Night's Dream"	
2005	Little Britain	Mrs. Mead	Series 3, episode 6	
2005	My Family and Other Animals	Louisa Durrell	Television film	
2006	Dogtown	Gwen Gregson	Miniseries; Episode 4	
2006	The Wind in the Willows	Barge Lady	Television film	
2007	Where Have I Been All Your Life?	Angela	Television short	
2007	Cranford	Miss Octavia Pole	Miniseries; 5 episodes	
2008	Clay	Mary Doonan	Television film	
2008	Coming Up	Mother	Episode: "Lickle Bill Um"	
2008	Big & Small	Ruby / Twiba	Voice; 28 episodes	
2009	Return to Cranford	Miss Octavia Pole	Episodes: "August 1844", "October 1844"	
2010–2011	Psychoville	Grace Andrews	Guest role (Halloween special) main role (series 2); 7 episodes	
2010	White Other	Lynne McDermott	Television short	
2011	Doctor Who	The Interface	Voice; Episode: "The Girl Who Waited"	
2012	The Girl	Alma Reville Hitchcock	Television film	
2013	Mouse and Mole at Christmas Time	Various roles	Voice; Television film	
2014	That Day We Sang	Enid	Television film	
2019	A Confession	Karen Edwards	Miniseries; 6 episodes	
2020	Flesh and Blood	Mary	Miniseries; 4 episodes	
2020	Talking Heads	Irene Ruddock	Episode: "A Lady of Letters"	
2020–2021	Trying	Penny	8 episodes	
2022–2023	The Crown	Queen Elizabeth II	Main role (Seasons 5–6); 20 episodes	
2023	Brassic	Aunt Edie	Episode: "A Very Brassic Christmas"	
2026	Agatha Christie's Tommy & Tuppence	Aunt Ada	Mystery drama television series	

=== Theatre ===
Year(s)	Title	Role(s)	Theatre(s)	Notes	Ref(s)
1982–1983	Guys and Dolls	Mimi (Hot Box Girl); Miss Adelaide (Note: Staunton replaced Julia McKenzie as Miss Adelaide since May 1983.)	Royal National Theatre		
1982–1983	The Beggar's Opera	Molly Brazen / Lucy Lockit	Royal National Theatre		
1982–1983	Schweyk in the Second World War	Anna	Royal National Theatre		
1984	A Mad World, My Masters	Janet Claughton	Theatre Royal Stratford East		
1984	Us Good Girls	Paulette	Soho Theatre		
1985	The Corn Is Green	Bessie Watty	The Old Vic		
1985–1986	A Chorus of Disapproval	Hannah Llewellyn	Royal National Theatre		
1987	Venus and Adonis	Venus	Barbican Centre		
1987	The Fair Maid of the West	Bess Bridges	Mermaid Theatre		
1987	They Shoot Horses, Don't They?	Gloria Beatty	Mermaid Theatre		
1987–1988	The Wizard of Oz	Dorothy Gale	Barbican Centre		
1988	Uncle Vanya	Sonya	Vaudeville Theatre		
1989	The Lady and the Clarinet	Luba	King's Head Theatre		
1990–1991	Into the Woods	The Baker's Wife	Phoenix Theatre		
1991	Bold Girls	Cassie	Hampstead Theatre		
1994	On Borrowed Time	—	Southwark Playhouse	Producer and director	
1994–1995	Slavs!	Bonfila	Hampstead Theatre		
1996	Habeas Corpus	Mrs. Swabb	Donmar Warehouse		
1996–1997	Guys and Dolls	Miss Adelaide	Royal National Theatre		
1998	Divas at the Donmar	—	Donmar Warehouse	Solo cabaret season	
2000–2001	Life x 3	Ines	Royal National Theatre; The Old Vic (Note: The production transferred to the Old Vic in February 2001.)		
2004	Calico	Nora Barnacle	Duke of York's Theatre		
2007	There Came a Gypsy Riding	Margaret	Almeida Theatre		
2007	Follies in Concert	Hattie Walker	London Palladium	Benefit concert	
2009	Entertaining Mr Sloane	Kath	Trafalgar Theatre		
2011	A Delicate Balance	Claire	Almeida Theatre		
2011–2012	Sweeney Todd: The Demon Barber of Fleet Street	Mrs. Lovett	Chichester Festival Theatre; Adelphi Theatre		
2013	Circle Mirror Transformation	Marty	Royal Court Theatre		
2014	Good People	Margie Walsh	Hampstead Theatre; Noël Coward Theatre (Note: The production transferred to the Noël Coward Theatre in April 2014.)		
2014–2015	Gypsy	Momma Rose	Chichester Festival Theatre; Savoy Theatre		
2017	Who's Afraid of Virginia Woolf?	Martha	Harold Pinter Theatre		
2017–2018	Follies	Sally Durant Plummer	Royal National Theatre		
2020	Talking Heads	Irene Ruddock	Bridge Theatre	Segment: "A Lady of Letters"	
2024	Hello, Dolly!	Dolly Gallagher Levi	London Palladium		
2025	Mrs. Warren's Profession	Kitty Warren	Garrick Theatre		

=== Theme park attractions ===
Year	Title	Role	Ref(s)
2025	Harry Potter and the Battle at the Ministry	Dolores Umbridge	

=== Discography ===
- 1990: Into the Woods – Original London Cast; as baker's wife.
- 2010: Julia Donaldson Audio Collection; as the narrator of the Gruffalo, The Gruffalo's Child, Highway Rat, Zog, and Charlie Cook's Favourite Book.
- 2012: Sweeney Todd – Revival Cast Recording; as Mrs. Lovett.
- 2015: Gypsy – London Cast Recording; as Momma Rose.
- 2019: Follies – London Cast Recording; as Sally.

== Awards and honours ==
Staunton has received numerous accolades including a BAFTA Award, five Olivier Awards, and a Screen Actors Guild Award in addition to nominations for an Academy Award, three Golden Globe Awards, and two Primetime Emmy Awards. Staunton was appointed Officer of the Order of the British Empire (OBE) in the 2006 New Year Honours, Commander of the Order of the British Empire (CBE) in the 2016 New Year Honours and Dame Commander of the Order of the British Empire (DBE) in the 2024 Birthday Honours, all for services to drama, and the last additionally for charity.

== See also ==
- List of British actors
- List of Academy Award winners and nominees from Great Britain
- List of actors with Academy Award nominations
