= Daunt and Dervish =

British radio drama series

- Genre: Radio drama
- Country of origin: United Kingdom
- Language: English
- Home station: BBC Radio 4
- Starring: Anna Massey; Imelda Staunton; Frances Barber; Sylvestra Le Touzel; Bill Paterson; Sean Scanlan
- Created by: Guy Meredith
- Original release: 17 November 2003 – 3 April 2009
- No. of series: 4
- No. of episodes: 20

Daunt and Dervish is a British radio drama series broadcast on BBC Radio 4 from 2003 to 2009. Set in the aftermath of the Second World War, the series focuses on former spies Josephine Daunt and Susan Dervish as they operate a detective agency with the aid of former private investigator Bill Mackie.

== Cast ==
- Anna Massey as Josephine Daunt
- Imelda Staunton as Susan Dervish (Series 1)
- Frances Barber as Susan Dervish (Series 2)
- Sylvestra Le Touzel as Susan Dervish (Series 3–4)
- Bill Paterson as Bill Mackie (Series 1)
- Sean Scanlan as Bill Mackie (Series 2–4)

== Episodes ==
Series	Episode	Title	First broadcast	Ref.
One	1	After the Ball is Over	17 November 2003	
One	2	South of the Border	18 November 2003	
One	3	A Question of Class	19 November 2003	
One	4	Games of Chance	20 November 2003	
One	5	The Singer not the Song	21 November 2003	
Two	1	In Questionable Shape	19 May 2006	
Two	2	Que Reste-t-ll de Nos Amours?	26 May 2006	
Two	3	Some Commandment or Other	2 June 2006	
Two	4	A Farewell to Ingleby	9 June 2006	
Two	5	Base Metal	16 June 2006	
Three	1	Episode One	4 February 2008	
Three	2	Episode Two	5 February 2008	
Three	3	Episode Three	6 February 2008	
Three	4	Episode Four	7 February 2008	
Three	5	Episode Five	8 February 2008	
Four	1	Episode One	30 March 2009	
Four	2	Episode Two	31 March 2009	
Four	3	Episode Three	1 April 2009	
Four	4	Episode Four	2 April 2009	
Four	5	Episode Five	3 April 2009	
