= Helen's Trust =

Helen's Trust was a nonprofit organization located in Derbyshire, England in the United Kingdom. It aimed to enable people with any terminal illness to have the choice to stay in their own home. Originally established in Baslow, the charity supported people throughout North Derbyshire and Sheffield, providing a help at recipients homes. The organization supported those in need with home care respite, equipment acquisitions, household chores, and additional tasks needed to support those with terminal illness to stay at home.

In 2020, Helen's Trust merged with neighbouring end of life care charity, Blythe House Hospicecare, to provide more high-quality care and support to those affected by life-limiting illnesses across the whole of North Derbyshire.

In 2024 the merger was formalised with a new name – Blythe House Hospice – and a new clear identity which celebrates its past by keeping the historic colours of both charities, remembering Helen Lyon and the founders of both Helen’s Trust and Blythe House.

== History ==
The charity was named after Helen Louise Lyon (1956-2001). Lyon died from breast cancer. Lyon focused on living a normal life, living at her home instead of entering a hospital when her cancer worsened. The charity launched one week after her funeral, in 2001.

== President and Patrons ==
The Duchess of Devonshire was the president of the Trust. Patrons included Dominic West, who became involved after his mother wished to stay at home during the final stages of an illness, and Roy Hattersley.
