= Action for Trans Health =

British advocacy group

Action for Trans Health is a British advocacy group that campaigns to improve access to transgender health care and to make it more democratic. Action for Trans Health operates as a loose federation of "chapters", local grassroots trans advocacy groups linked by "the principles of mutual aid, education, and solidarity". The national organisation's last solidarity fund round closed in 2021.

== History ==
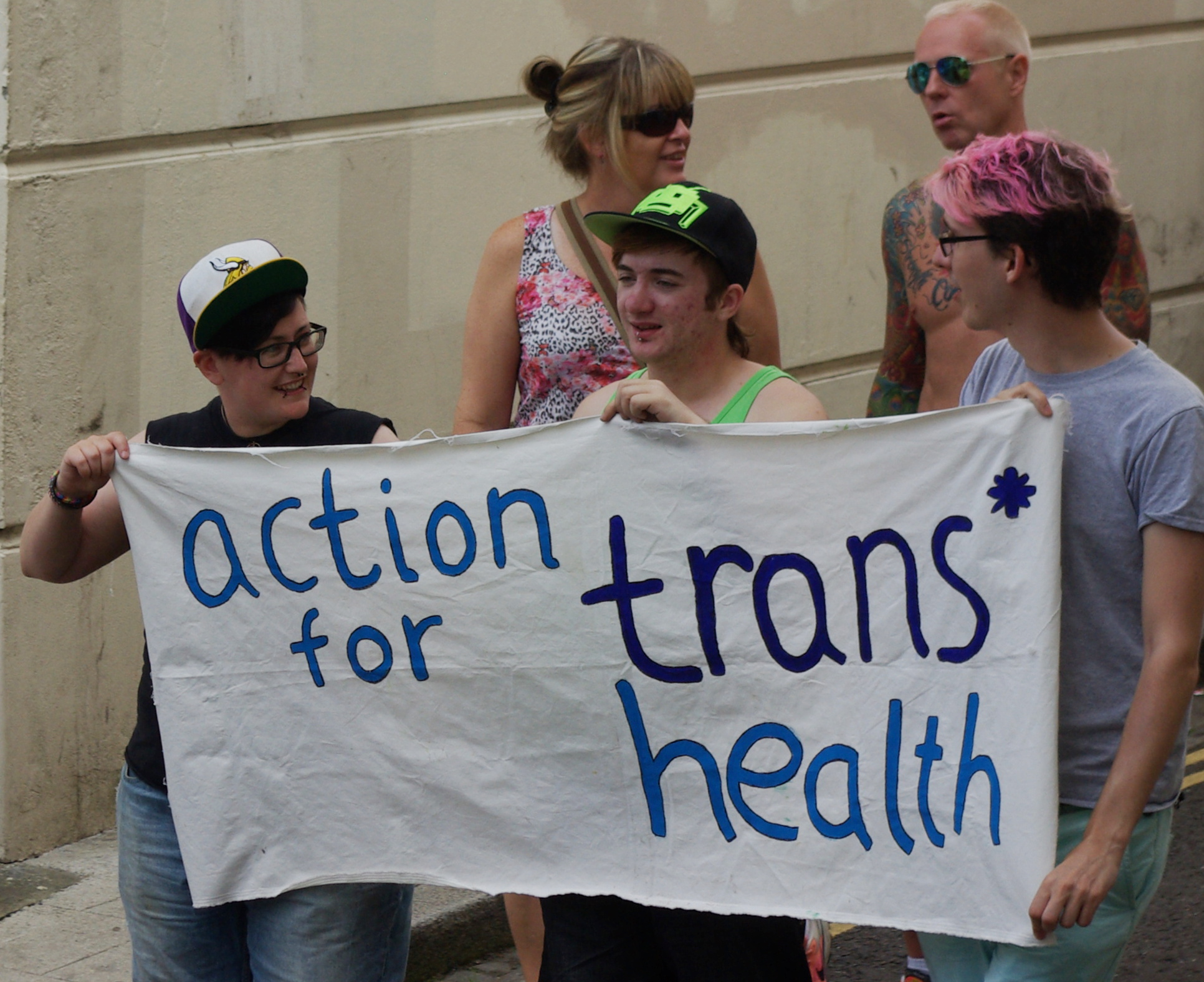
Action for Trans Heath in 2014

In January 2017, the group co-organised a protest with No Prisons Manchester and Queer Agenda Sheffield outside of HM Prison Doncaster over the death of Jenny Swift, a trans woman who died while incarcerated in the prison. In September 2017, the group was involved in a counter-protest against an anti-trans group at Speakers' Corner in Hyde Park that sparked controversy after a brief fight broke out between one of the anti-trans demonstrators and one of the counter-protestors.

In May 2021, Dr Harriet Hutchinson – a community organiser with Action for Trans Health Durham (an independent but broadly aligned local chapter) – gave evidence to a meeting of the Women and Equalities Select Committee for the committee's inquiry into Gender Recognition Act 2004 reform. Hutchinson provided the committee with evidence that trans people were often forced to "conform to stereotypes in order to receive a diagnosis" of gender dysphoria, and called for the NHS Gender Identity Clinic system to be abandoned in favour of an informed consent model.

== Services ==
The group maintains a list of trans-friendly GPs in the United Kingdom, crowdsourced from the trans community.
