= Lesbians Against Pit Closures =

Alliance in support of striking UK miners

Lesbians Against Pit Closures (LAPC) were an alliance of lesbian women who came together to support the National Union of Mineworkers and various mining communities during the 1984–1985 United Kingdom miners' strike. They were formed after a schism in the Lesbians and Gays Support the Miners (LGSM) movement, in November 1984. Members of the organisation were involved in picket line protests against the delivery of coal to the factories by strikebreakers.

== History ==
We do regular collections around lesbian pubs and clubs [...] we do collections outside of supermarkets, as well, to try and involve other people in what we're doing, as well as the normal activities in colleges and workplaces that other people are involved in as well.

— LAPC activist, speaking for All Out! Dancing in Dulais (produced by LGSM)

LAPC originated when a number of lesbian LGSM members decided they needed to split from LGSM to create a women-only space for lesbians. This was mainly due to issues concerning sexism, misogyny and lesbophobia among men in the LGSM movement. Ray Goodspeed, an LGSM member, says: "The men in the meetings were generally like men in most meetings", and according to founders of LAPC, when the issues of a lesbian-only organisation were discussed in LGSM, "they [LGSM members] often snorted with derision". LAPC was also formed as a group to give women a voice, as with Women Against Pit Closures, to help bring feminist ideas into a working men's sphere, such as a miners' institute. Some women said they were intimidated by the gay men who made up the bulk of LGSM membership.

The alliances which the campaign forged between LGBTQ and labour groups also proved to be an important turning point in the progression of LGBT issues in the United Kingdom. Miners' labour groups began to support and endorse and participate in various LGBT pride events throughout the UK; at the 1985 Labour Party conference in Bournemouth, a resolution committing the party to support LGBT equality rights passed for the first time due to block voting support from the National Union of Mineworkers; and miners' groups were among the most outspoken allies of the LGBT community in the 1988 campaign against Section 28.

== Activities and fundraising ==
LAPC used some similar tactics to LGSM, such as rattling buckets outside of bars and clubs to raise money for the miners, but operated with a specific focus on women's issues. They held weekly planning meetings, for which they shared the duties of taking and sending out minutes, and photocopying. They organized daily collections outside supermarkets, visited pit village, attended picket lines, and organized women-only benefit nights. They marched with their banner in the Lesbian Strength March in 1985 and the London Gay Pride March in 1985, alongside LGSM and the mining communities. At one point they organized a women-only day at Kentish Town Women's Centre for themselves and some of the mining women from Dulais valley.

With LGSM, they were a part of a short promotional film about the two group's unified work during the Miners' Strike called All Out! Dancing in Dulais.

== Depiction in Pride ==
The film Pride, which depicted the unity of LGSM and the Onllwyn mining community in Wales, also mentioned the LAPC splinter organisation.

== See also ==
- Intersectionality
- Lesbian feminism
- Lesbians and Gays Support the Miners
- National Union of Mineworkers (Great Britain)
- Socialism and LGBT rights
- 1984–1985 United Kingdom miners' strike
- Pride (2014 film)
- Women Against Pit Closures
