= Pride (2014 film) =

2014 film by Matthew Warchus

- Theatrical release poster
- Directed by: Matthew Warchus
- Screenplay by: Stephen Beresford
- Produced by: David Livingstone
- Starring: Bill Nighy; Imelda Staunton; Dominic West; Paddy Considine; Andrew Scott; George MacKay; Joseph Gilgun; Ben Schnetzer
- Cinematography: Tat Radcliffe
- Edited by: Melanie Ann Oliver
- Music by: Christopher Nightingale
- Production companies: Pathé; BBC Films; British Film Institute; Calamity Films; Canal+; Ciné+
- Distributed by: 20th Century Fox (United Kingdom); Pathé Distribution (France)
- Release dates: 23 May 2014 (Cannes Film Festival); 12 September 2014 (United Kingdom); 17 September 2014 (France)
- Running time: 120 minutes
- Countries: United Kingdom; France
- Language: English
- Box office: $19 million

Pride is a 2014 historical comedy-drama film written by Stephen Beresford and directed by Matthew Warchus. It stars Bill Nighy, Imelda Staunton, Dominic West, Paddy Considine, Andrew Scott, George MacKay, Joseph Gilgun and Ben Schnetzer. Based on a true story, the film depicts a group of lesbian and gay activists who raised money to help families affected by the British miners' strike in 1984, at the outset of what would become the Lesbians and Gays Support the Miners campaign.

The film had its world premiere in the Directors' Fortnight section of the 2014 Cannes Film Festival, where it won the Queer Palm award. Screenwriter Beresford said a stage musical adaptation involving director Warchus was being planned.

Pride was nominated for the Golden Globe Award for Best Motion Picture – Musical or Comedy and for the BAFTA for Best British Film, Best Actress in a Supporting Role for Staunton and for Outstanding Debut by a British Writer, Director or Producer.

A stage musical adaptation premiered at the Sherman Theatre, Cardiff on 31 March 2026 before opening in the Dorfman Theatre at the Royal National Theatre, London in June 2026 where it is expected to run until mid-September 2026.

== Plot ==
Upon watching the news about the Welsh miners' strike of 1984, gay activist Mark Ashton realises that the police have stopped harassing the gay community because they are harassing the miners instead. He spontaneously arranges a bucket collection for the miners during the Gay Pride Parade in London. Encouraged by the success, he founds "Lesbians and Gays Support the Miners" (LGSM). Among its first members are 20-year-old closeted student Joe Cooper and an older gay couple, Jonathan Blake and Gethin Roberts, whose bookshop, Gay's the Word, is used as the group's headquarters.

LGSM faces homophobia from the mining community and anger from gay people who have been mistreated by miners in the past. Frustrated by the lack of response, the activists instead decide to take their donations directly to the small mining village of Onllwyn in Wales. Dai Donovan, spokesperson for the miners in Onllwyn, comes to London to meet their new allies. Though he is startled to learn that "L" and "G" stand for "Lesbian and Gay", he expresses his gratitude in a short, eloquent speech at a gay bar, and the cause takes off.

In Onllwyn, the Women's Support group, led by Hefina Headon and Maureen Barry, debate whether to invite LGSM to the village as a thank you; Hefina, and her supporters, favour gratitude from all camps, whilst Maureen's supporters consider the gays abhorrent. First-time volunteer Siân James speaks up fiercely in favour of inviting LGSM and is asked to join the committee.

When LGSM arrives in Onllwyn, they are met with a frosty reception and Maureen leads a walkout after Mark's speech to the village. However, the next day, Jonathan shares with Siân his knowledge of harassment laws and abuse of police power; the fiery Siân marches down to the police station to demand the release of illegally detained miners.

Many grateful miners acknowledge LGSM's role in their release, relations begin to thaw and the two communities quickly become close. Finding herself on the outside, Maureen contacts a tabloid about the situation in Onllwyn. The resulting story humiliates the National Union of Mineworkers, who call a vote on whether to accept LGSM's support.

Back in London, Mark declares that they will embrace the labels in the tabloid and throws an enormous concert at the Electric Ballroom, headlined by Bronski Beat and attended by Dai, Hefina and a number of the women from the village. Mark is badly shaken when he encounters a former lover who implies that he, the lover, is dying of AIDS. The "Pits and Perverts" festival raises thousands of pounds for Onllwyn, but the Union vote moves forward three hours without notice, and without Dai or Hefina, Maureen's camp succeeds in voting to refuse further help from LGSM.

Disillusioned and haunted, Mark abandons LGSM. Gethin, who initially refused to participate due to his own experience coming out in a mining village, attempts to campaign alone and is violently assaulted and hospitalised. Meanwhile, Joe is outed when his parents find photos from Onllwyn and they keep him away from the group.

In March 1985, the miners' strike is over. The miners of Onllwyn gather to go back into the mines. Joe sees the news and sneaks off to Onllwyn to show solidarity, where he encounters Mark. Mark confronts Joe about hiding his activism and homosexuality from his parents. When Siân drives him to London in the LGSM-donated van, he learns of Gethin's condition. Joe decides it is time to leave home and has her drive him directly up to his home, embarrassing his conservative mother.

On the day of the 1985 Gay Pride Parade, Mark returns to the group and apologises for abandoning the cause. He leads LGSM to the Parade, where they are joined by hundreds of miners in a show of solidarity.

A textual epilogue reveals that consequently the Labour Party incorporated rights for gays and lesbians in their party programme due in part to a massive vote lodged by the National Union of Mineworkers, that Siân was elected to Parliament, that Jonathan still lived, despite being one of the first people in Britain to be diagnosed with HIV, and that Mark Ashton died of AIDS just two years later at the age of 26.

== Cast ==
LGSM members

- Dominic West as Jonathan Blake, Gethin's partner and the second person diagnosed with HIV in the UK
- Andrew Scott as Gethin Roberts, Jonathan's partner and a Welshman who was alienated from his village when he came out sixteen years earlier
- George MacKay as Joe "Bromley" Cooper, a fictional LGSM member
- Joseph Gilgun as Michael "Mike" Jackson, Mark's best friend
- Ben Schnetzer as Mark Ashton, founder of LGSM
- Chris Overton as Reggie Blennerhassett, Ray's partner
- Faye Marsay as Stephanie "Steph" Chambers, the sole lesbian among the LGSM founders
- Freddie Fox as Jeff Cole, popular with the Onllwyn children
- Joshua Hill as Ray Aller, Reggie's partner

Women's Support Group members

- Imelda Staunton as Hefina Headon, member of the strike committee
- Jessica Gunning as Siân James, wife of Martin
- Lisa Palfrey as Maureen Barry, sister-in-law of Cliff and a widow who is against LGSM support
- Liz White as Margaret Donovan, member of the strike committee and wife of Dai
- Nia Gwynne as Gail Pritchard, wife of Alan
- Menna Trussler as Gwen, an elderly member, and widow of William, who was a miner

Other characters

- Bill Nighy as Cliff Barry, a leader of the men's union
- Paddy Considine as David "Dai" Donovan, a leader of the men's union and member of the strike committee
- Monica Dolan as Marion Cooper, Bromley's mother
- Rhodri Meilir as Martin James, a leader of the men's union
- Matthew Flynn as Tony Cooper, Bromley's father
- Karina Fernandez as Stella, an LGSM member who broke off to form an all-female group Lesbians Against Pit Closures
- Jessie Cave as Zoe, Stella's girlfriend
- Kyle Rees as Carl Evans, a miner who asks Jonathan for dancing lessons
- Jack Baggs as Gary, Carl's friend who also asks for dance lessons
- Sophie Evans as Debbie Thomas
- Olwen Medi as Gethin's mother, who initially disowned him for being gay
- Jams Thomas as the Miners Union leader
- Deddie Davies as the old lady at bingo
- Russell Tovey as Tim, apparent ex-lover of Mark

== Release ==
=== Cinema release ===
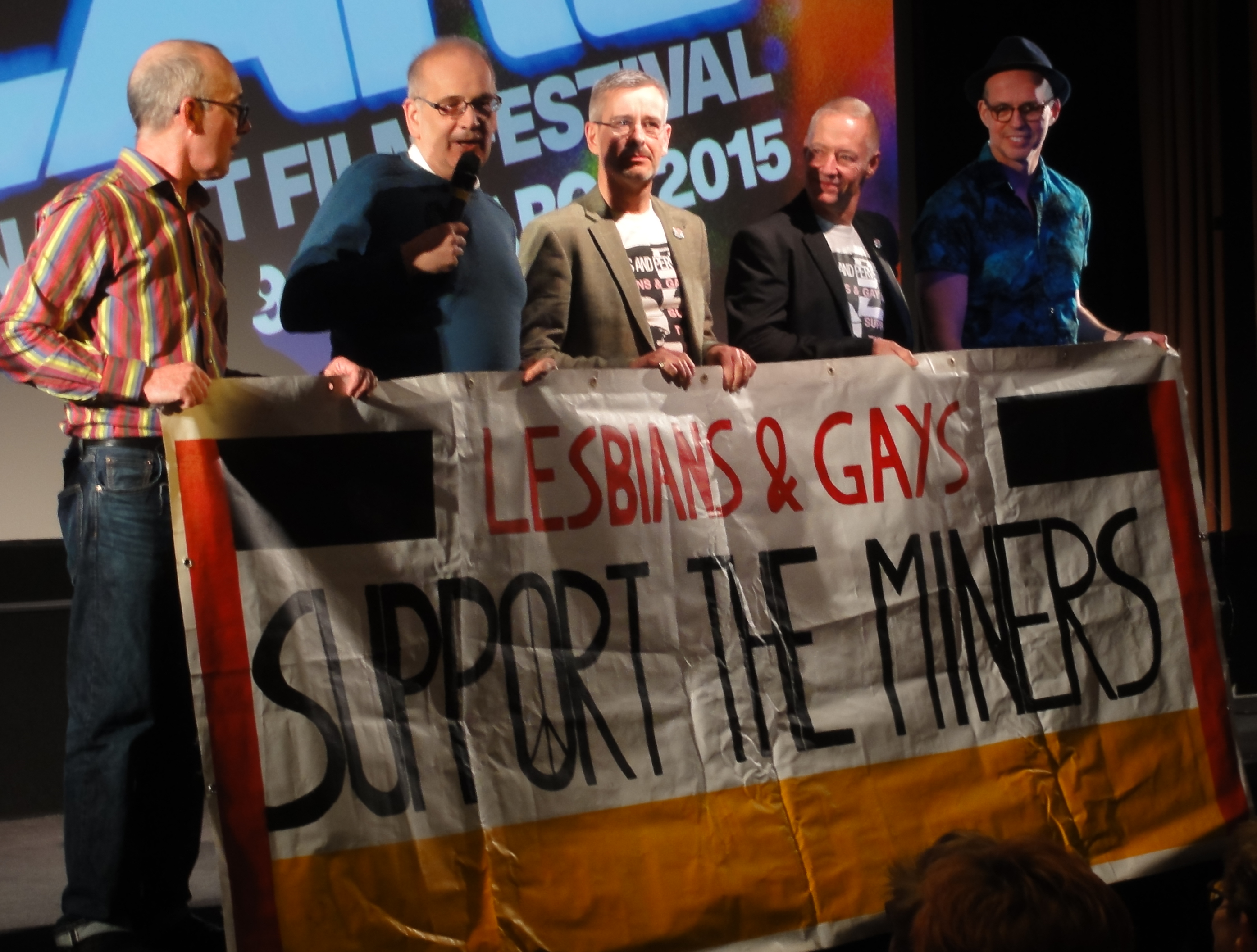
The actual members of Lesbians and Gays Support the Miners, speaking at a 2015 British Film Institute event devoted to the film. Left → right: Mike Jackson, Gethin Roberts, Reggie Blennerhassett, Ray Aller, Jeff Cole.

Pride premiered at the 2014 Cannes Film Festival, where it received a standing ovation and won the Queer Palm award. It was also screened at the 2014 Toronto International Film Festival, with the Washington Post reporting that it was "hugely popular with preview and festival audiences". It was released to cinemas throughout the UK on 12 September 2014. It was released in France on 17 September. It was distributed by Pathé in the UK and France, with the title being distributed through Pathé's British distribution partner 20th Century Fox. CBS Films acquired distribution rights for the United States.

The film received a limited release in the US on 26 September 2014, in New York City, Los Angeles and San Francisco.

=== Controversies ===
In the UK, the film received a 15 certificate by the British Board of Film Classification for "occasional strong language" and two scenes of a sexual nature, one scene in a gay club where men are depicted "wearing 'bondage' clothing", and a comedic scene where some of the characters discover a pornographic magazine in a bedroom. The MPAA gave the film an R rating, the nearest US equivalent to the UK's 15 certificate. (This reflects common practice; the British Film Institute states that "most" 15 certificate films are R-rated in the US.) The Independent published an article calling the MPAA's rating "draconian", alleging that the R rating's higher age restriction ("no unaccompanied under-17s") was specifically applied due to gay content. The Independent's article formed the basis for a Guardian article which further compounded the issue by mistakenly stating that the MPAA had given the film an NC-17 rating. This error was corrected a few days later.

In January 2015, it was reported that the cover of the US DVD release of the film made no mention of the gay content. A standard description of "a London-based group of gay and lesbian activists" was reduced to "a group of London-based activists", and a lesbian and gay banner was removed from a photograph on the back cover.

The absence of direct mention of Mark Ashton's communist beliefs in the film (even though they are hinted at from the start), despite his position as the leader of the youth branch of the Communist Party of Great Britain (CPGB), has become a point of contention for his surviving friends. Fellow communist activist and a close friend of Mark Ashton, Lorraine Douglas, accused the film of having "glossed over Mark's politics and said nothing about the fact he subsequently became General Secretary of the YCL", the youth wing of the CPGB.

== Reception ==
=== Box office ===
In its opening weekend Pride took £718,778 at the UK box office. It was the third highest-grossing release of the weekend, behind Lucy in second place and The Boxtrolls, which debuted at the top of the box office. During its second weekend in the UK, Pride retained its third-place position with takings of £578,794. The Guardian reported that it had a drop of just 12% during its second weekend, and a strong weekday performance: "After a somewhat shaky start, Matthew Warchus' film is displaying signs of solid traction with audiences." In its third weekend, Pride dropped to sixth with takings of £400,247 over the weekend period. By its fourth weekend it had dropped to tenth place, with takings of £248,654 and an overall UK gross totalling £3,265,317.

In the US, Pride grossed £84,800 from six theatres in its opening weekend. It expanded slowly, adding cinemas in existing markets for its second weekend followed by release in additional cities from 10 October.

=== Critical response ===
Pride was met with critical acclaim. On review aggregator Rotten Tomatoes 92% of 127 critics gave the film a positive review, with an average rating of 7.6 out of 10. The site's consensus reads: "Earnest without being didactic and uplifting without stooping to sentimentality, Pride is a joyous crowd-pleaser that genuinely works." Metacritic gave the film an aggregate score of 79/100 based on 36 reviews, indicating "generally favorable reviews". Audiences surveyed by CinemaScore gave the film an average grade of "A" on an A+ to F scale.

Geoffrey Macnab, of The Independent, noted how Pride followed on from other British films such as The Full Monty, Brassed Off and Billy Elliot as "a story set in a Britain whose industrial base is being shattered". Macnab, who gave the film a five-star review, praised the screenplay for combining "broad comedy with subtle observation", and noted that director Matthew Warchus "relishes visual contrasts and jarring juxtapositions" throughout the film. Macnab's review stated that Pride retained its humour and accessibility without trivialising the issues addressed in the film.

Peter Bradshaw, reviewing for The Guardian, described the film as "impassioned and lovable". Bradshaw praised performances of the cast, including Bill Nighy's "taciturn shyness" in his portrayal as Cliff and the "dignified and intelligent performance" from Paddy Considine as Dai. Imelda Staunton's performance as Hefina Headon, who died in October 2013, was met with positive reviews by critics. Geoffrey Macnab said Staunton's performance as the matriarchal Hefina was "part Mother Courage and part Hilda Ogden". Ben Schnetzer's performance as Mark Ashton drew positive reviews. Charlotte O'Sullivan, writing for the London Evening Standard, said: "Schnetzer is a New Yorker with an unpromising CV (he was one of the few good things about The Book Thief) and he's fantastic here".

Paul Byrnes in The Sydney Morning Herald described the film as "dry, surprising, compassionate, politically savvy, emotionally rewarding and stacked to the gills with great actors doing solid work".

Nigel Andrews, writing for the Financial Times, gave the film one star out of five, describing it as "a parade of tricks, tropes and tritenesses, designed to keep its balance for two hours atop a political correctness unicycle". Andrews' review read, "Nothing in modern history is more amazing than the cultural rebranding of the UK miners' strike as a heroic crusade, rather than a Luddite last stand for (inter alia) union demagoguery, greenhouse gas and emphysema."

=== Awards ===
Award	Date of ceremony	Category	Recipients	Result
Cannes Film Festival	25 May 2014	Queer Palm	Pride	Won
Cannes Film Festival	25 May 2014	Directors' Fortnight	Pride	Nominated
Flanders International Film Festival Ghent 2014	27 October 2014	Audience award "Port of Ghent"	Pride	Won
Leiden International Film Festival 2014	10 November 2014	Audience Award	Pride	Won
British Independent Film Awards	7 December 2014	Best British Independent Film	Pride	Won
British Independent Film Awards	7 December 2014	Best Director	Matthew Warchus	Nominated
British Independent Film Awards	7 December 2014	Best Screenplay	Stephen Beresford	Nominated
British Independent Film Awards	7 December 2014	Best Supporting Actress	Imelda Staunton	Won
British Independent Film Awards	7 December 2014	Best Supporting Actor	Andrew Scott	Won
British Independent Film Awards	7 December 2014	Best Supporting Actor	Ben Schnetzer	Nominated
British Independent Film Awards	7 December 2014	Most Promising Newcomer	Ben Schnetzer	Nominated
Golden Globe Awards	11 January 2015	Best Motion Picture – Musical or Comedy	Pride	Nominated
London Film Critics Circle Awards	18 January 2015	British Film of the Year	Pride	Nominated
Dorian Awards 2014	20 January 2015	LGBTQ Film of the Year	Pride	Won
Dorian Awards 2014	20 January 2015	Unsung Film of the Year	Pride	Won
Dorian Awards 2014	20 January 2015	Film of the Year	Pride	Nominated
Artios Awards	22 January 2015	Outstanding Achievement in Casting - Feature Film Studio or Independent Comedy	Fiona Weir	Nominated
British Academy Film Awards	8 February 2015	Best British Film	Pride	Nominated
British Academy Film Awards	8 February 2015	Best Actress in a Supporting Role	Imelda Staunton	Nominated
British Academy Film Awards	8 February 2015	Outstanding Debut by a British Writer, Director or Producer	Stephen Beresford and David Livingstone	Won
GLAAD Media Awards	21 March 2015	Outstanding Film - Wide Release	Pride	Nominated
Irish Film & Television Awards	24 May 2015	Actor in a Supporting Role in a Feature Film	Andrew Scott	Nominated
Apolo Awards	8 January 2016	Best Film	Pride	Won
Apolo Awards	8 January 2016	Best Director	Matthew Warchus	Nominated
Apolo Awards	8 January 2016	Best Original Screenplay	Stephen Beresford	Won
Apolo Awards	8 January 2016	Best Sound	Jamie Caple, Tony Gibson, Blair Jollands and Martin Trevis	Nominated
Apolo Awards	8 January 2016	Best Supporting Actor	Andrew Scott	Nominated
Apolo Awards	8 January 2016	Best Supporting Actress	Imelda Staunton	Nominated
Apolo Awards	8 January 2016	Best Ensemble Cast	Ben Schnetzer, Monica Dolan, George MacKay, Bill Nighy, Andrew Scott, Imelda Staunton, Dominic West, Paddy Considine, Joseph Gilgun, Sophie Evans, Lisa Palfrey, Menna Trussler, Karina Fernandez, Liz White, Chris Overton, Jessica Gunning, Matthew Flynn, Jessie Cave and Freddie Fox	Won

== Soundtrack ==
Pride Music From and Inspired by The Motion Picture

Soundtrack album by Various artists
- Released: 15 September 2014
- Length: 153:09
- Label: Universal Music
- Producer: Christopher Nightingale

Side one
No.	Title	Writer(s)	Length
1.	"I Want to Break Free"	Queen	4:23
2.	"Shame, Shame, Shame"	Shirley & Company	3:47
3.	"Why?"	Bronski Beat	4:04
4.	"Love & Pride"	King	3:21
5.	"Relax"	Frankie Goes to Hollywood	3:57
6.	"Tainted Love"	Soft Cell	2:37
7.	"West End Girls"	Pet Shop Boys	4:01
8.	"Karma Chameleon"	Culture Club	4:02
9.	"Pull Up to the Bumper"	Grace Jones	4:42
10.	"You Spin Me Round"	Dead or Alive	3:19
11.	"Freedom"	Wham!	5:20
12.	"I Second That Emotion"	Smokey Robinson	2:42
13.	"Walls Come Tumbling Down"	The Style Council	3:23
14.	"Temptation"	Heaven 17	3:26
15.	"Love Will Tear Us Apart"	Joy Division	3:21
16.	"Pale Shelter"	Tears for Fears	4:27
17.	"Making Plans For Nigel"	XTC	4:12
18.	"Our Lips Are Sealed"	Fun Boy Three	2:53
19.	"There Is Power in a Union"	Billy Bragg	2:49
20.	"Solidarity Forever"	Pete Seeger	2:51
21.	"Across the Great Divide"	Frank Solivan	3:54
Total length:			01:17:31

Side two
No.	Title	Writer(s)	Length
1.	"Two Tribes"	Frankie Goes to Hollywood	3:24
2.	"Blue Monday"	New Order	4:04
3.	"For a Friend"	The Communards	4:36
4.	"All of My Heart"	ABC	4:49
5.	"Do Ya Wanna Funk"	Sylvester	3:29
6.	"Red Red Wine"	UB40	3:00
7.	"Genius of Love"	Tom Tom Club	3:28
8.	"Homosapien"	Pete Shelley	4:34
9.	"Hard Times"	The Human League	4:54
10.	"I Travel"	Simple Minds	4:03
11.	"A New England"	Kirsty MacColl	3:48
12.	"Waiting for the Love Boat"	Associates	4:26
13.	"Ghosts"	Japan	4:32
14.	"Living on the Ceiling"	Blancmange	4:03
15.	"Robert De Niro's Waiting..."	Bananarama	3:41
16.	"Keep On Keepin' On!"	The Redskins	3:52
17.	"Are You Ready to Be Heartbroken"	Lloyd Cole and the Commotions	3:05
18.	"Across the Bridge"	Christopher Nightingale	1:40
19.	"Autumn Montage"	Christopher Nightingale	1:25
20.	"Homecoming"	Christopher Nightingale	2:50
21.	"Bread and Roses"	Bronwen Lewis	1:55
Total length:			01:15:38

Parts of the soundtrack were recorded with Tredegar Town Band, who also appeared on-screen.

== Musical adaptation ==
It was announced on 3 October 2022 that a musical adaptation of Pride is currently in development with Warchus directing the stage version.

On 29 April 2025, it was announced that the musical will have its world premiere in the Dorfman Theatre at the Royal National Theatre, London, in a co-production with the Sherman Theatre, Cardiff, as part of Indhu Rubasingham's inaugural season announcement. The musical will be directed by Warchus, with book and lyrics by Beresford, with music by Christopher Nightingale, Josh Cohen and DJ Walde. The musical opened at the Sherman Theatre in March 2026.

== See also ==
- Brassed Off (1996)
- The Full Monty (1997)
- Billy Elliot (2000)
