= Jonathan Blake (activist) =

British gay rights activist

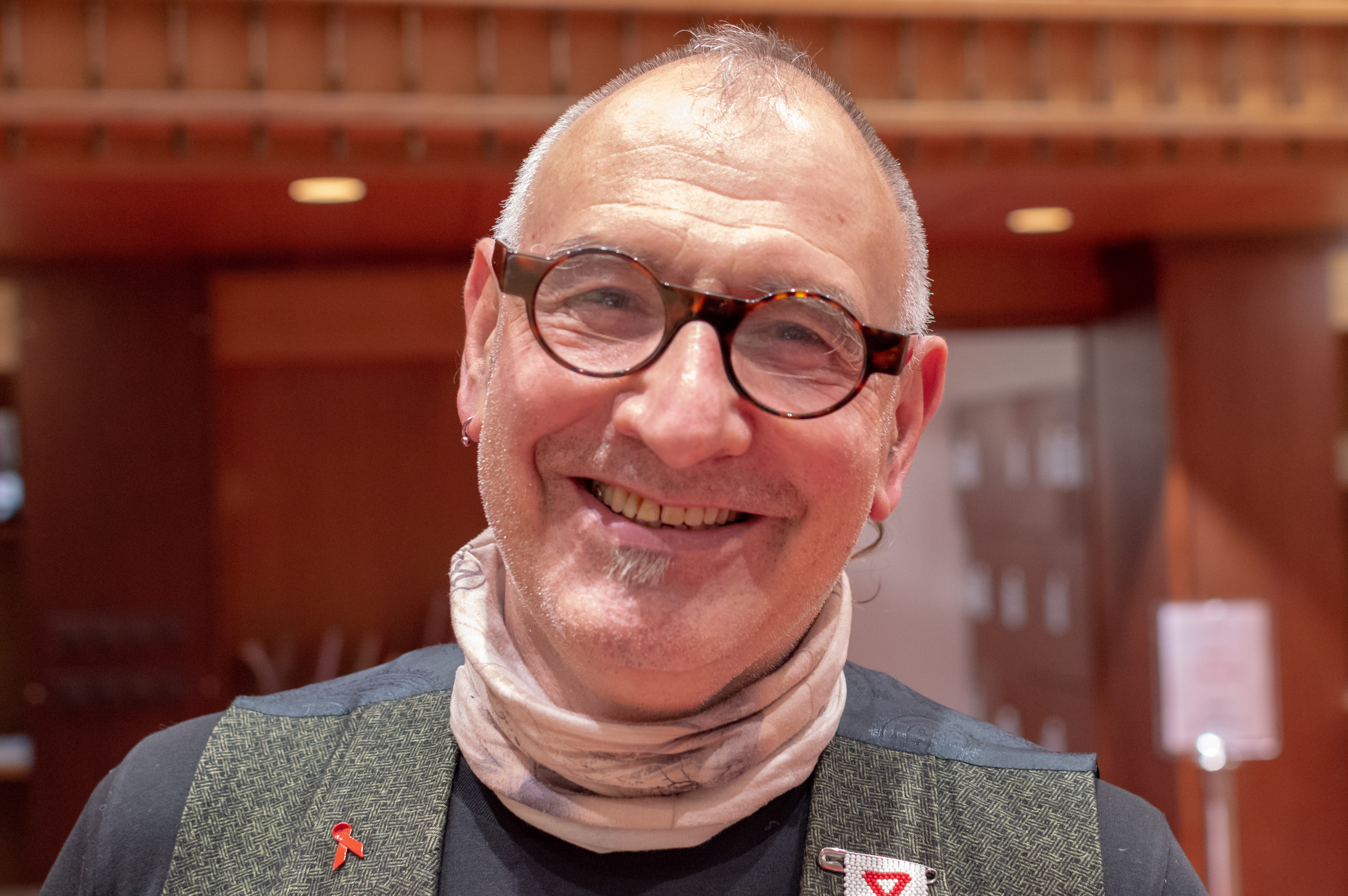
- Blake in 2018
- Born: 21 July 1949 (age 77); Birmingham, England
- Occupation: Gay rights activist
- Movement: Lesbians and Gays Support the Miners

Jonathan Blake (born 21 July 1949) is a British gay rights activist and former member of Lesbians and Gays Support the Miners (LGSM). He was one of the first people diagnosed with HIV in the United Kingdom and is one of the country's longest surviving people with the illness.

== Biography ==
In February 1981 Blake visited a friend who was getting married in San Francisco in the US. He believes it was there that he contracted the virus, during a visit to a steambath.

In July 1982, he noticed he had enlarged lymph nodes, and they continued growing and becoming more painful. He checked into a STI clinic and in October of that year he was diagnosed with HIV; then called HTLV3. He was the first case at Middlesex Hospital, given the number L1 (London 1), and one of the first cases in the country.

"They came back and said, "You have a virus, there is absolutely nothing we can give you to help. There will be palliative care when the time comes, and you have about six months to live", and that was that. They said I could go home."

In December of that year, in fear of how the illness would affect him he attempted suicide: "the voice of my mother was in my head, she would say, 'you have to clean up your own mess!' And then it was a question of, well I can't kill myself. I better go on and live. But how on earth are you going to do that?". A turning point took place when he attended a nuclear protest with a group of gay men in 1983. It was there he met his partner Nigel Young and started being more politically active. Together they joined Lesbians and Gays Support the Miners, which helped Blake take his mind off his diagnosis. He continued to live his life, immersing himself in volunteering and completing education courses, ultimately obtaining a diploma in tailoring and working on theatre productions and eventually becoming an assistant pattern cutter for the English National Opera.

Blake saw men living with HIV die during a trial for antiretroviral drug AZT in the late 1980s and refused to take part, believing it was a failed chemotherapy drug, and while it wiped out the cancer, it also wiped out the immune system.

In 1989 his CD4 (T cell) count fell to 200, the cut off point for an AIDS diagnosis. In 1996 he decided to start medical treatment, a combination of D4T, DDI and Nevirapine, and after 4 weeks felt the effects, describing his sudden surge of energy as "Lazarus raised from the dead". He started Anti Retro-Viral Therapy (ART) in 1997 which he continues to this day.

== Legacy ==
He extensively discussed his experiences of attitudes towards sexual health and homosexuality during the 1970s. He speaks openly about living with HIV and the struggles it entails, and fights against the stigmatisation of the illness. He has volunteered at various HIV drop-in centres including The Landmark in Brixton/Tulse Hill; Lighthouse South London; the Terrence Higgins Trust (THT); and The Food Chain. He was the Face of THT's first safer sex poster aimed at gay men and took part in Peter Cash's HIV Monologues (2016–18). He is a champion of the U=U (Undetectable = Untransmittable) campaign and a commentator on current LGBTQ+ rights issues.

In September 2014, LGSM's activities were dramatised in the film Pride, where he was played by Dominic West.

== See also ==
- HIV/AIDS in the United Kingdom
- HIV/AIDS activism
