= Stansted 15 =

UK activists who stopped a deportation flight in 2017

The Stansted 15 are a group of human rights activists who took action to stop a deportation flight leaving from Stansted Airport, UK on 28 March 2017. The plane, a Titan Airways Boeing 767 was chartered by the UK Home Office to deport 60 migrants to Ghana, Nigeria and Sierra Leone.

The group were arrested, endured a ten week trial and later prosecuted in December 2018 under the Aviation and Maritime Security Act 1990 and convicted of terrorism-related charges. During February 2019, they received suspended sentences or community orders after the presiding judge (Judge Armstrong) decided not to imprison them stating he believed the group had been motivated by "genuine reasons".

In January 2021, the convictions of the Stansted 15 were overturned on appeal.

== The action ==
On the night of 28 March 2017, the group of nine women and six men cut a hole measuring one square metre in the perimeter fence of Stansted Airport. Four protesters then arranged themselves around the front landing gear of the aircraft and locked their arms together inside double-layered pipes filled with expanding foam, also displaying a banner stating “mass deportations kill”. Their aim was to prevent the departure of a deportation flight from Stansted Airport that had been chartered by the UK Home Office to forcibly deport 60 migrants to Ghana, Nigeria and Sierra Leone. The activists said that they acted to prevent human rights abuses from taking place. However, they were accused of putting the safety of the airport and passengers at risk and causing serious disruption to international air travel. The police charged the group with aggravated trespassing, an offence carrying a maximum three-month custodial sentence.

== The group ==
The group included members of the campaigning groups Lesbians and Gays Support the Migrants and End Deportations. Members were Helen Brewer, Lyndsay Burtonshaw, Nathan Clack, Laura Clayson, Melanie Evans, Joseph McGahan, Benjamin Smoke, Jyotsna Ram, Nicholas Sigsworth, Alistair Tamlit, Edward Thacker, Emma Hughes, May MacKeith, Ruth Potts and Melanie Strickland.

== The deportees ==
As of 2018, Eleven of the 60 passengers who were to be deported on the aircraft still live in the UK. Amongst the passengers to be deported were two victims of human trafficking.

The majority of deportations take place on standard scheduled flights, but in this case, the activists intercepted a mass deportation charter flight. Up to 2,000 people a year travel on these secretive night flights, often shackled in “waist restraint belts” or “leg restraints”. Deportees travel on aircraft hired from charter companies including Titan Airways.

== Trial ==
The Stansted 15 stated that they acted to prevent human rights abuses from taking place but were accused of putting the safety of the airport and passengers at risk and causing serious disruption to international air travel. During the trial, representatives of Amnesty International UK were observing due to the serious concern that the charges had been made to deter other protesters from taking non-violent direct action, and that the group were treated with undue harshness in relation to the severity of the 'crimes'.

Following a ten week trial, a jury at Chelmsford Crown Court found all members of the group guilty of intentional disruption of services at an aerodrome, under the Aviation and Maritime Security Act 1990, a law passed in response to the 1988 Lockerbie bombing. Following their conviction, a demonstration to protest against the Stansted 15’s guilty verdict was held outside the Home Office. More than 1,300 attendees turned out to hear MPs Diane Abbott and Clive Lewis speak alongside Lesbians and Gays Support the Migrants.

== Appeal ==
On 29 January 2021, the Court of Appeal quashed the convictions of the Stansted 15, finding that "it could not be established to the criminal standard that the actions of the appellants created disruption to the services of Stansted airport which was likely to endanger its safe operation or the safety of persons there". The Court ruled that there was no case to answer: "their conduct did not satisfy the various elements of the offence".
