= Hefina Headon =

Welsh activist (1930–2013)

- Born: Hefina Lewis; 8 June 1930; Bryn-henllan, Wales, UK
- Died: 5 October 2013 (aged 83); Abercraf, Wales, UK
- Spouse(s): Johnny Smith (1947–1953 divorced); John Headon (1958–1999 his death)
- Children: David Smith (deceased); Jennifer Smith (deceased); Jayne Headon; Allison Headon; Ian Headon

Hefina Headon (8 June 1930 – 5 October 2013) was a Welsh community and human rights activist. She became a notable figure in Wales through her activism during the UK miners' strike of 1984–1985. A biography was released in August 2015.

== Life and activism ==
Headon was born in Bryn-henllan, Wales, the daughter of Catherine Louisa "Katie" (née Phillips d.1996) and Thomas Idris Lewis (d. 1972). She had two sisters, Verona and Norma, and a brother, John.

She became an activist in the Welsh Labour Party's support of the miners' strike of 1984–1985. Headon served as secretary of the Seven Sisters Labour Party branch and was organiser and speaker for many of the protests the group conducted. She was also a member of the Swansea Valley Women's Support Group. She dedicated her life to numerous social causes including LGBT rights. She was director of the Dulais Valley Partnership from 1998 to 2001, an organisation that "finds solutions to the social and economic deprivation of the Dulais Valley".

== Portrayal in media ==
In the 2014 film Pride, Headon was portrayed by English actress Imelda Staunton. Staunton won the British Independent Film Award and received a nomination for the BAFTA Award for Best Actress in a Supporting Role for her performance as Headon, who died while the film was in production in the autumn of 2013.

Headon's contributions during the 1984–1985 miners' strike were chronicled in the book by Hywel Francis, History on our Side: Wales and the 1984–1985 Miners’ Strike. A new edition of the book was released in 2015, dedicated to the memory of Headon. Francis stated that Headon "played a critical role in building the very special alliance between LGSM (Lesbians and Gays Support the Miners) and our local support group". He also said of Hefina Headon that she was "quite outstanding in her courage and political leadership, in her public speaking (including the big Afan Lido Rally), fundraising, picketing and unique style of minute taking".

In 2006, Welsh artist Jacqueline Alkema created an art exhibit titled Women with a Past, featuring Hefina Headon as one of six women. Alkema painted portraits of each woman, stating "I found something encapsulating about them, these were fighters and active women and the strike was still with them".

== Bibliography ==
- Francis, Hywel (2015) [1st pub. Iconau:2009]. History on our Side: Wales and the 1984-85 Miners' Strike. London: Lawrence and Wishart. ISBN 978-1-910448-15-1.
- Headon, Jayne D. (2015). Mrs Hellfire "You Said it!": The Life & Endeavours of Hefina Headon with Memoirs from Family & Friends. Headon Publishing. ISBN 978-0-9933475-0-4.
- Moses-Lloyd, Rachel (14 October 2013). "Tributes paid to Dulais Valley woman, Hefina Headon, who fought for miners". South Wales Evening Post.
- Turner, Robin (21 March 2013). "Miners Strike: When the gay community stood up for the miners". Wales Online.
