= Lucy Robinson (historian) =

Lucy Robinson is an academic historian whose work examines the history of sexuality, identity politics, youth cultures and the political Left in the twentieth century. She is Professor in Collaborative History at the University of Sussex, as of 2018.

== Career and research ==
Robinson is a graduate of Oxford Brookes University, where she read English Studies and History; she also completed a master's degree at the University of Sussex, where she subsequently carried out her doctoral research; her PhD was awarded in 2003 for her thesis "Gay men and the revolutionary left in Britain since 1957: tracing the development of identity politics". She subsequently worked at the University of Sussex, where she is Professor in Collaborative History and Joint Head of the Department of History as of 2018.

== Books ==
In addition to articles in peer-reviewed journals, Robinson has authored or edited the following books:

- Gay Men and the Left in Post-War Britain: How the Personal Got Political, Critical Labour Movement Studies (Manchester University Press, 2007).
- (Co-edited with Keith Gildart, Anna Gough-Yates, Sian Lincoln, Bill Osgerby, John Street, Peter Webb and Matthew Worley) Subcultures, Popular Music and Social Change (Cambridge Scholars, 2014).
- (Co-edited with Jon Garland, Keith Gildart, Anna Gough-Yates, Paul Hodkinson, Sian Lincoln, Bill Osgerby, John Street, Peter Webb and Matthew Worley) Fight Back: Punk, Politics and Resistance (Manchester University Press, 2014).
- (Co-edited with Keith Gildart, Anna Gough-Yates, Sian Lincoln, Bill Osgerby, John Street, Peter Webb and Matthew Worley) Youth Culture and Social Change: Making a Difference by Making a Noise, Palgrave Studies in the History of Subcultures and Popular Music (Palgrave, 2017).
