= Lesbians and Gays Support the Miners =

1984–85 alliance to support striking British miners

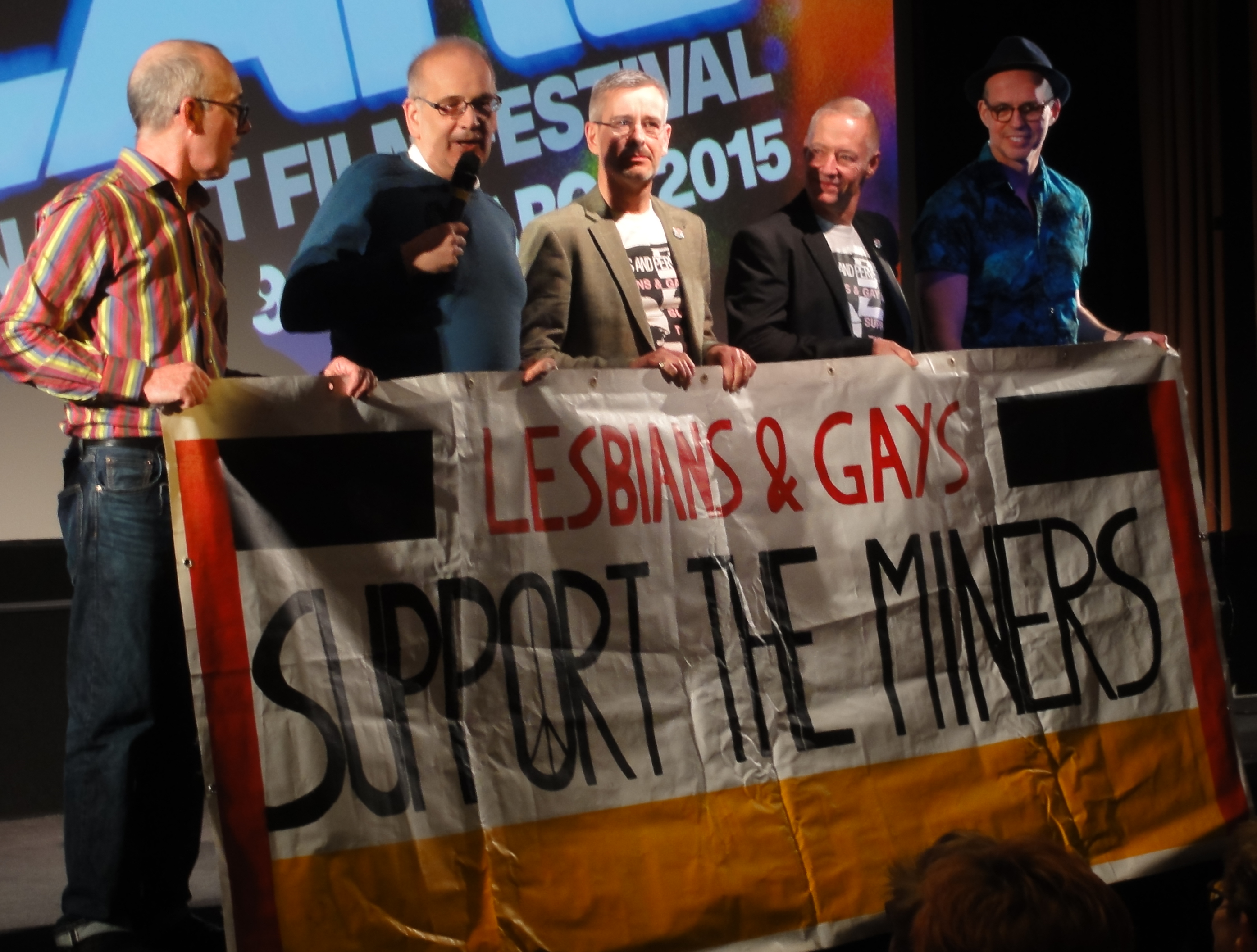
- Lesbians and Gays Support the Miners, speaking at a 2015 British Film Institute event devoted to the 2014 film Pride. L-R: Mike Jackson, Gethin Roberts, Reggie Blennerhassett, Ray Aller, Jeff Cole.
- Abbreviation: LGSM
- Formation: 30 June 1984; 42 years ago
- Founder: Mark Ashton, Mike Jackson
- Founded at: London
- Type: Advocacy group
- Headquarters: Gay's the Word bookshop; afterwards The Fallen Angel pub
- Secessions: Lesbians Against Pit Closures
- Website: lgsm.org

Lesbians and Gays Support the Miners (LGSM) was an alliance of lesbians and gay men who supported the National Union of Mineworkers during the year-long strike of 1984–1985.

As of 1985, eleven LGSM groups had emerged in the UK. The original London-based group alone raised approximately £22,500 (equivalent to £70,000 in 2025) in support for strikers.

== Background ==
During the UK miners' strike of 1984–1985, the Thatcher government sequestered the funds of the National Union of Mineworkers (NUM), meaning that it was pointless for supporters of the strike to send donations to the national union. Instead, support groups in Britain were encouraged to partner with the various mining communities in England, Scotland and Wales.

== History ==
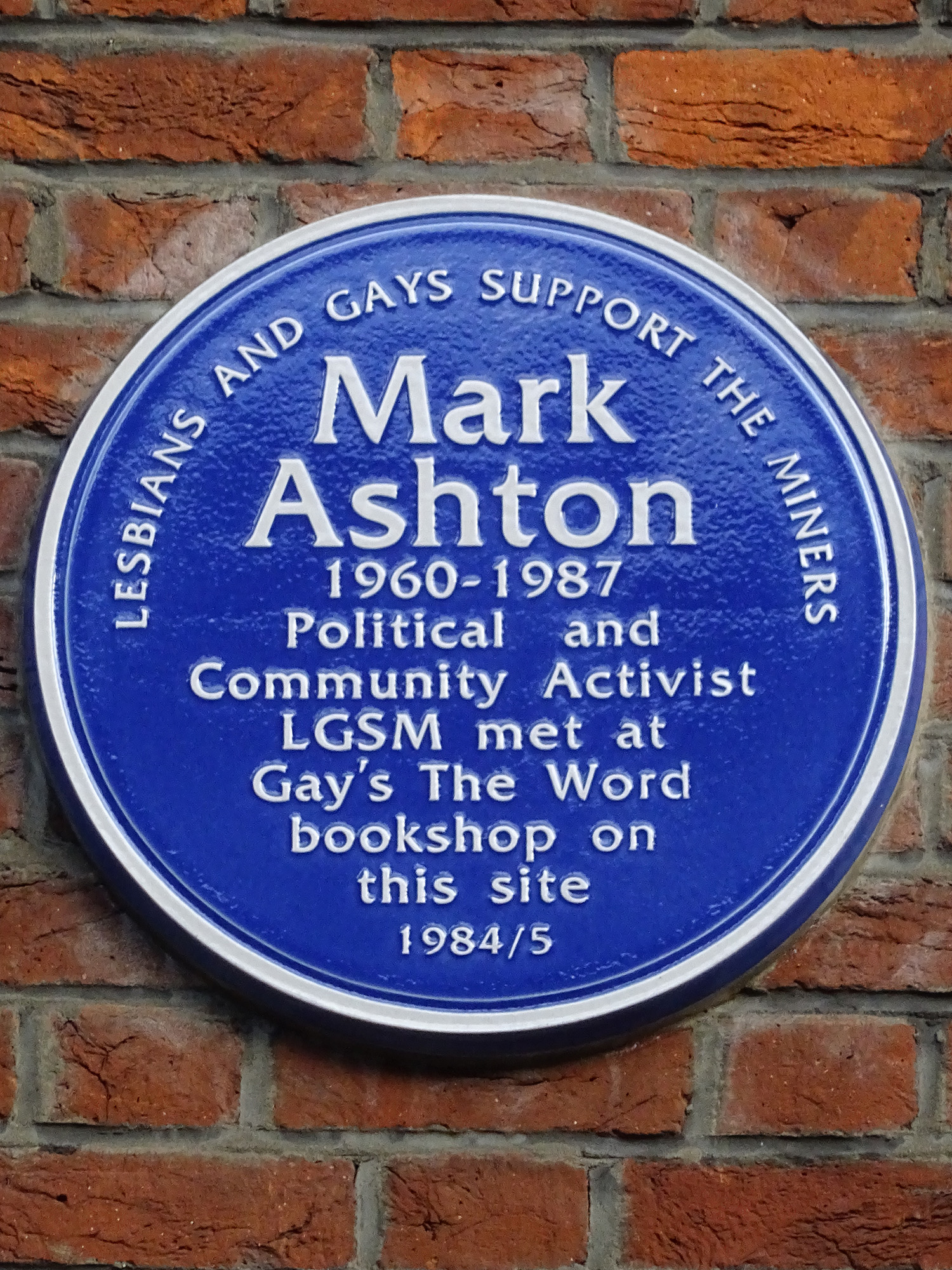
Plaque at Gay's the Word celebrating Mark Ashton and LGSM

Three months into the strike, Lesbians and Gays Support the Miners (LGSM) was established by Communist Party of Great Britain activist Mark Ashton, Mike Jackson, and their friends, after they had collected donations for the miners at the 1984 Lesbian and Gay Pride march in London. At that pride march, Ashton and Jackson collected a total of around £150 (equivalent to £490 in 2025).

The London LGSM group met and fundraised in numerous locations, including the Gay's the Word bookshop. The group grew rapidly and moved out of the bookshop to a larger venue—The Fallen Angel, a gay pub in Graham Street, Islington, which LGSM had also used as a fundraising location. The London group was twinned with the Neath, Dulais, and Swansea Valleys Miners Support Group.

In September 1984, inspired by the London group a second LGSM group was independently established in Lothian in Scotland. In November, a group of lesbians broke away from LGSM to form a separate group, Lesbians Against Pit Closures, although some lesbians remained active in the LGSM campaign rather than joining the women-only group.

The money raised was used to buy a white minibus to help transport the miners and their families for giving speeches relevant to their campaign. The minibus had a pink triangle and 'Lesbians and Gays Support the Miners' printed on it.

In addition to raising approximately £22,500 for the families who were on strike, there were reciprocal visits. The largest fundraising event that LGSM organised was the "Pits and Perverts" benefit concert, which was held in the Electric Ballroom in Camden Town, London, on 10 December 1984. The event was headlined by Bronski Beat and its lead singer, Jimmy Somerville. The title of the fundraiser event is claimed by many to have originated as a headline in the British tabloid The Sun "perverts supporting the Pits". The benefit concert raised an estimated £5,000.

== Outlook ==
The members of LGSM gave their support to the miners from a socialist standpoint. The group gave unconditional support to the miners without any expectation or requirement that miners would suddenly support lesbian and gay liberation. Rather, members of LGSM were socialists who were out and open about their sexuality, instead of only being socialists supporting the miners. Additionally LGSM members sought to demonstrate solidarity of a shared struggle. One common example was that LGSM members related to police harassment that both striking miners and queer people had endured.

LGSM chose to twin the Dulais Support Group instead of giving money directly to the NUM. Some historians, like Lucy Robinson, thought that the LGSM twinning with the Dulais Support Group, and not giving money directly to NUM, was a sort of rejection of the NUM. This interpretation has been critiqued by Diarmaid Kelliher noting quotes from LGSM's Rosie Leach and Mark Ashton, implying the LGSM saw little difference between the support groups and the NUM.

In terms of partisan affiliation, members included Labour Party, Communist Party of Great Britain, Socialist Workers Party, Socialist Organiser and International Marxist Group. Many LGSM members however held an anti-Thatcher and socialist view point without being a member of any political party.

== Legacy ==
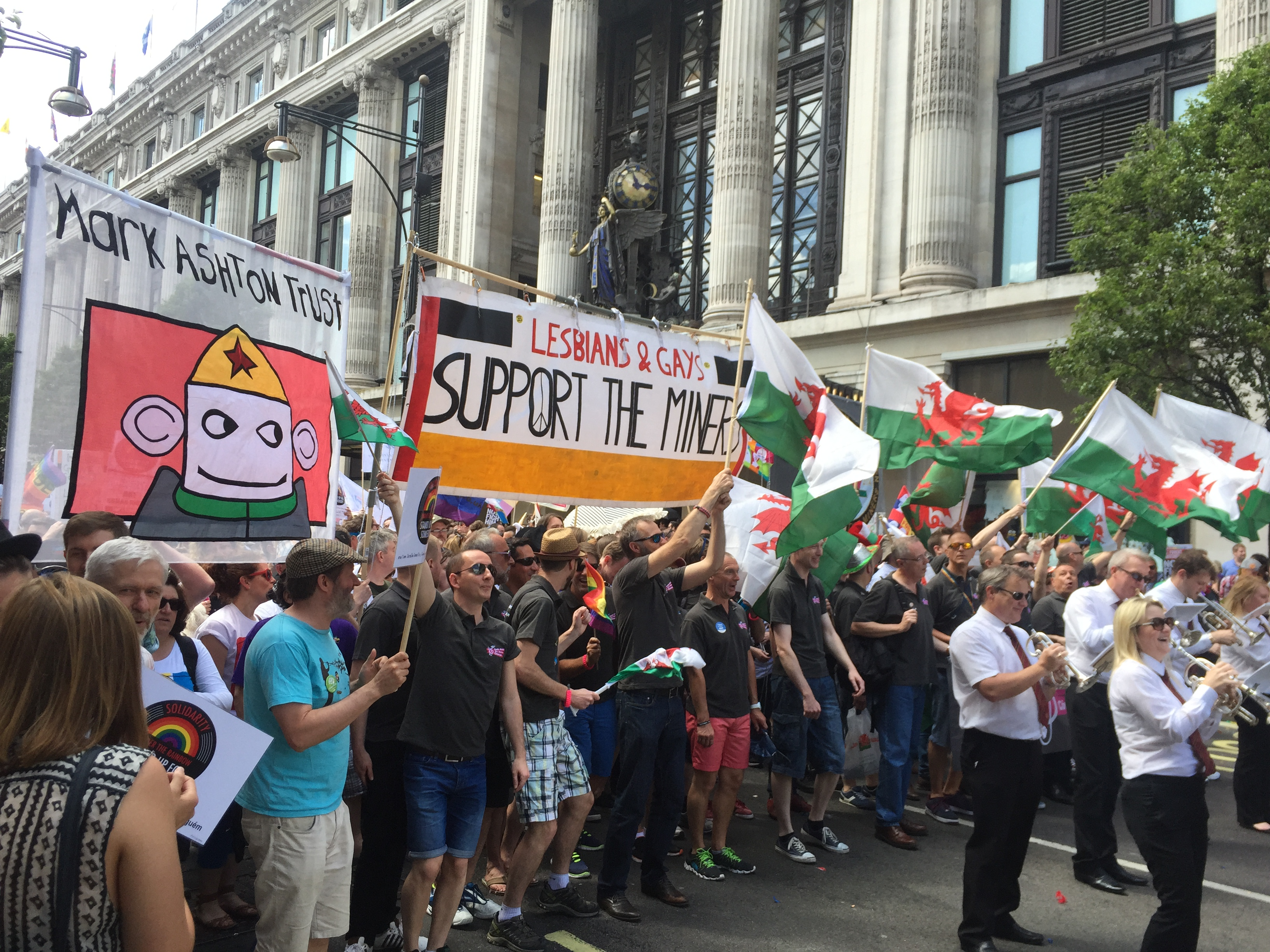
LGSM and Welsh miners at Pride in London 2015

The alliances which the campaign forged between the lesbian, gay, bisexual, transgender, and queer (LGBTQ) community and British labour groups proved to be an important turning point in the progression of LGBT matters in the United Kingdom. Miners' labour groups began to support, endorse and participate in various gay pride events throughout the UK, including leading London's Lesbian and Gay Pride parade in 1985. At the 1985 Labour Party conference in Bournemouth, a resolution committing the party to the support of LGBT rights passed, due to block voting support from the National Union of Mineworkers. The miners' groups were also among the most outspoken allies of the LGBT community in the 1988 campaign against Section 28.

An archive of the London group's work is kept at the People's History Museum in Manchester. It includes the minutes of the weekly meetings, correspondence, press cuttings, publicity material, enamel badges, photographs and the group's banner. The London group's alliance with the Welsh mining village of Onllwyn is dramatised in the 2014 film, Pride, which was directed by Matthew Warchus. Several of the surviving group members participated in the film's promotion. Some commentators noted that the film downplayed Mark Ashton's connections to the Communist Party of Great Britain, specifically as General Secretary of its youth wing, the Young Communist League.

In 2015, following the film's release, the surviving members of the organisation held a 30th anniversary reunion to raise funds for the Mark Ashton Fund, an HIV/AIDS charitable fund administered by the Terrence Higgins Trust. The group was chosen to lead the 2015 Birmingham Pride parade, in recognition of their historic status. They were also slated to lead the 2015 Pride in London parade but withdrew in favour of marching further back after organisers refused to allow other affiliated groups, such as trade union contingents, to march with the LGSM. They also accepted invitations to 2015 Pride marches in Derry, Doncaster, Newcastle upon Tyne, Sunderland, Norwich, Liverpool Pride, Belfast and Leeds Pride.

LGSM announced on 9 October 2015 that they would "wind down as a current campaigning force", saying that they did not want to become "an LGBT version of the British Legion". The group elected four original core members to carry the legacy of the group onwards. These were Mike Jackson (Secretary), Dave Lewis (Press Officer), Martin Goodsell and Brett Haran (Treasurers). The remit of the four is to continue fundraising by selling merchandise (t-shirts, badges, the book Pride, etc.); respond to speaker requests; develop and maintain the website and to attend directly related mineworkers' legacy events such as the Durham Miners' Gala. The legacy group gained the approval of a substantial majority of the former members in supporting Jeremy Corbyn as Labour leader in August 2016.

Lesbians and Gays Support the Migrants was named in reference to LGSM.

In 2022, a documentary Pride in Our Valley was made which featured the LGSM.

In 2026, following withdrawal of local council support for Durham Pride by the Reform UK council, about £25,000 was donated by trade unions, the Durham Miners Association and similar groups as a direct response to the historic solidarity between the LGBT+ community and miners

=== Pride, the book ===
The group were approached in 2016 by UK publisher John Blake Books to produce a book about LGSM and they accepted. Author Tim Tate was chosen. He made extensive audio recordings of original members of LGSM and the mining families and activists they twinned with in South Wales. These verbatim interviews are woven together with the author's explanatory narrative. The book was published in 2017 by John Blake, it is available both in paperback and digital editions.

== See also ==
- Siân James MP
- Jonathan Blake
- Hefina Headon
- Women Against Pit Closures
- Intersectionality
- Socialism and LGBT rights

== Bibliography ==
- Blain, Terence (9 October 2013). "Pits and Perverts by Micheál Kerrigan". Irish Theatre Magazine. Archived from the original on 29 December 2014.
- Cabadi, Marie (2023). Lesbiennes et gays au charbon. Solidarités avec les mineurs en grève, 1984-1985 (in French). Paris: Éditions EHESS. ISBN 978-2-7132-2959-6.
- Clarke, Cath (12 September 2014). "Meet the people who inspired 'Pride'". Time Out London.
- Clews, Colin (10 September 2012a). "1984. Lesbians and Gays Support the Miners. Part One". Gay in the 80s.
- Clews, Colin (13 September 2012b). "1985. Lesbians and Gays Support the Miners. Part Two". Gay in the 80s.
- Clews, Colin (27 May 2013). "1984. 'Pits and Perverts' Benefit Concert". Gay in the 80s.
- Clews, Colin (15 September 2014). "1984. Politics: Lesbians Against Pit Closures". Gay in the 80s.
- Field, Nicola (1995). Over the Rainbow: Money, Class and Homophobia. London: Pluto Press. pp. 163–165. ISBN 978-0-7453-0826-5. OL 7955132M.
- Fisher, Emily (29 September 2014). "Lesbians and Gays Support the Miners material at the People's History Museum". PHMMcr.
- Francis, Hywel (2015) [1st pub. Iconau:2009]. History on our Side: Wales and the 1984-85 Miners' Strike. London: Lawrence and Wishart. ISBN 978-1-910448-15-1.
- Hall–Carpenter Archives (1989). Walking After Midnight: Gay Men's Life Stories. London: Routledge. ISBN 978-0-415-02957-5. OL 15164674W.
- Hartley, Eve (29 February 2016). "LGBT History Month: How One Bookshop Battled Homophobic Attacks While Supporting The Miners Strike". Huffington Post.
- Kellaway, Kate (31 August 2014). "When miners and gay activists united: the real story of the film Pride". The Guardian.
- Kelliher, Diarmaid (2014). "Solidarity and Sexuality: Lesbians and Gays Support the Miners 1984–5" (PDF). History Workshop Journal. 77 (1). Oxford Journals: 240–262. doi:10.1093/hwj/dbt012. S2CID 41955541.
- Leeworthy, Daryl (5 March 2015). "'Don't worry about him, he's a Scargill man': The Miners' Strike and after". History on the Dole. Archived from the original on 2 April 2015.
- Robinson, Lucy (2007). Gay men and the left in post-war Britain: how the personal got political. Manchester: Manchester University Press. ISBN 978-0-7190-7434-9. OL 21837097M.
- Smith, Evan; Leeworthy, Daryl (2016). "Before Pride: The Struggle for the Recognition of Gay Rights in the British Communist Movement, 1973–85". Twentieth Century British History. 27 (4): 621–642. doi:10.1093/tcbh/hww043 – via Scholars Portal Journals.
- Tate, Time (2017). Pride: The Unlikely Story of the True Heroes of the Miners' Strike. John Blake Publishing Ltd. ISBN 978-1-78606-291-8.
