= 2013 WhatsOnStage Awards =

British theatre awards

The WhatsOnStage Awards, founded in 2001 as the Theatregoers' Choice Awards, are a fan-driven set of awards organised by the theatre website WhatsOnStage.com, based on a popular vote recognising performers and productions of English theatre, with an emphasis on London's West End theatre.

The 2013 Whatsonstage Award winners and nominees were:

Best New Play	Best New Musical
The Curious Incident of the Dog in the Night-time; 55 Days; Chariots of Fire; Constellations; Red Velvet; The Effect	The Bodyguard; Daddy Long Legs; Loserville; Soho Cinders; Sweet Smell of Success; Top Hat
Best Play Revival	Best Musical Revival
Abigail's Party; A Doll’s House; Long Day’s Journey into Night; Our Boys; She Stoops to Conquer; The Judas Kiss	Sweeney Todd; Jesus Christ Superstar; Kiss Me, Kate; Merrily We Roll Along; Singin’ in the Rain; Taboo
Best Actor in a Play	Best Actress in a Play
Rupert Everett – The Judas Kiss; Adrian Lester – Red Velvet; David Haig – The Madness of George III; David Suchet – Long Day’s Journey into Night; Luke Treadaway – The Curious Incident of the Dog in the Night-time; Mark Rylance – Twelfth Night & Richard III	Sheridan Smith – Hedda Gabler; Billie Piper – The Effect; Hattie Morahan – A Doll’s House; Jill Halfpenny – Abigail’s Party; Julie Walters – The Last of the Haussmans; Sally Hawkins – Constellations
Best Actor in a Musical	Best Actress in a Musical
Michael Ball – Sweeney Todd; Adam Cooper – Singin’ in the Rain; Alex Bourne – Kiss Me, Kate; Lloyd Owen – The Bodyguard; Mark Umbers – Merrily We Roll Along; Tom Chambers – Top Hat	Imelda Staunton – Sweeney Todd; Emi Wokoma – Soul Sister; Hannah Waddingham – Kiss Me, Kate; Heather Headley – The Bodyguard; Megan McGinnis – Daddy Long Legs; Scarlett Strallen – Singin’ in the Rain
Best Supporting Actor in a Play	Best Supporting Actress in a Play
Stephen Fry – Twelfth Night; Adrian Scarborough – Hedda Gabler; Andy Nyman – Abigail’s Party; Kyle Soller – Long Day’s Journey into Night; Mark Gatiss – The Recruiting Officer; Tim McInnerny – Scenes from an Execution	Natalie Casey – Abigail's Party; Fenella Woolgar – Hedda Gabler; Helen McCrory – The Last of the Haussmans; Jenny Jules – Moon on a Rainbow Shawl; Linda Bassett – In Basildon; Sophie Thompson – The Physicists
Best Supporting Actor in a Musical	Best Supporting Actress in a Musical
Tim Minchin – Jesus Christ Superstar; Adam Garcia – Kiss Me, Kate; Daniel Crossley – Singin’ in the Rain; Jon Robyns – Spamalot; Ricardo Afonso – Top Hat; Sam Buttery – Taboo	Melanie C – Jesus Christ Superstar; Beverly Rudd & Suzie Chard – Soho Cinders; Debbie Kurup – The Bodyguard; Katherine Kingsley – Singin’ in the Rain; Sian Phillips – Cabaret; Vivien Parry – Top Hat
Best Direction	Best Choreography
Jonathan Kent – Sweeney Todd; Edward Hall – Chariots of Fire; Gregory Doran – Julius Caesar; Lindsay Posner – Abigail’s Party, Noises Off, Uncle Vanya; Marianne Elliott – The Curious Incident of the Dog in the Night-time; Thea Sharrock – The Bodyguard	Andrew Wright – Singin’ in the Rain; Bill Deamer – Top Hat; Karen Bruce – Midnight Tango; Nathan M Wright – Sweet Smell of Success; Scott Ambler – Chariots of Fire; Stephen Mear – Kiss Me, Kate
Best Set Design	Best Lighting Design
Tom Scutt – The Lion, the Witch & the Wardrobe, Constellations; Bunny Christie – The Curious Incident of the Dog in the Night-time; Hildegard Bechtler – Scenes from an Execution; Michael Taylor – The Ladykillers; Miriam Buether – Chariots of Fire, Wild Swans, The Effect; Tim Hatley – The Bodyguard	Mark Henderson – Sweeney Todd; Humphrey McDermott – Let It Be; Lee Curran – Constellations; Patrick Woodroffe – Jesus Christ Superstar; Paul Anderson – The Master & Margarita; Paule Constable – The Curious Incident of the Dog in the Night-time, This House
Best Original Music	Best London Newcomer of the Year
Sweet Smell of Success – Marvin Hamlisch; Daddy Long Legs – Paul Gordon; Soho Cinders – George Stiles; The Last Session – Steve Schalchlin; The Magistrate – Richard Sisson; The Recruiting Officer – Michael Bruce	Will Young – Cabaret; Alex Lawther – South Downs; Joshua Miles – Bully Boy; Lolita Chakrabarti – Red Velvet; Maria Friedman – Merrily We Roll Along; Rob Brydon – A Chorus of Disapproval
Best Off-West End Production	Best Regional Production
Taboo; Desire Under the Elms; Mad About the Boy; Shivered; Steel Pier; Uncle Vanya	American Idiot; Company; Gypsy; Medea; The Resistible Rise of Arturo Ui; Wonderful Town
Best New Comedy	Best Shakespearean Production
The Ladykillers by Graham Linehan; All New People by Zach Braff; Birthday by Joe Penhall; NSFW by Lucy Kirkwood; People by Alan Bennett; The Last of the Haussmans by Stephen Beresford	Twelfth Night; Julius Caesar; King Lear; Much Ado About Nothing; Richard III; Timon of Athens
Best Takeover In A Role	Best West End Show
Ramin Karimloo – Les Misérables; Danielle Hope – Les Misérables; Dean Chisnall – Shrek The Musical; Gina Beck – Wicked; Oliver Tompsett – We Will Rock You; Owain Arthur – One Man, Two Guvnors	Les Misérables; Matilda the Musical; The Lion King); The Phantom of the Opera; War Horse; Wicked
Best Solo Performance	Best Ensemble Performance
Idina Menzel – Idina Menzel at the Apollo; Chris Larner – An Instinct for Kindness; Cillian Murphy – Misterman; Mark Quartley & Paul Chequer – Private Peaceful; Roger Rees – What You Will; Simon Callow – A Christmas Carol	Richard III & Twelfth Night; Chariots of Fire; Let It Be; Our Boys; The Curious Incident of the Dog in the Night-time; The Ladykillers
Theatre Event of the Year
Danny Boyle's Olympics Opening Ceremony; Jesus Christ Superstar‘s arena tour, following the ITV casting competition Superstar; Mark Rylance returning to Shakespeare's Globe in Twelfth Night & Richard III; The Globe to Globe season, all 37 plays in 37 different languages, as part of the World Shakespeare Festival; The opening of the new state-of-the-art St James Theatre on the site of the demolished Westminster Theatre; The premiere of the Susan Boyle bio-musical I Dreamed a Dream
