= 2012 Evening Standard Theatre Awards =

British theatre award season

The 2012 Evening Standard Theatre Awards were announced on 25 November 2012. The shortlist was revealed on 12 November 2012 and the longlist on 29 October 2012.

== Winners, shortlist and longlist ==
= winner

=== Best Play ===
- Constellations by Nick Payne (Royal Court Upstairs)
- Love and Information by Caryl Churchill (Royal Court Downstairs)
- This House by James Graham (Cottesloe Theatre)

==== Longlisted ====
- Choir Boy by Tarell Alvin McCraney (Royal Court Upstairs)
- The Curious Incident of the Dog in the Night-Time by Simon Stephens (Cottesloe Theatre)
- Jumpy by April De Angelis (Royal Court Downstairs and Duke of York's Theatre)
- The Last of the Duchess by Nicholas Wright (Hampstead Theatre)
- Love, Love, Love by Mike Bartlett (Royal Court Downstairs)
- Reasons to Be Pretty by Neil LaBute (Almeida)
- South Downs by David Hare (Chichester Minerva and the Harold Pinter)
- The Witness by Vivienne Franzmann (Royal Court Upstairs)

=== Best Director ===
- Nicholas Hytner for Timon of Athens (Olivier Theatre)
- Carrie Cracknell for A Doll's House (Young Vic)
- James Macdonald for Love and Information (Royal Court Downstairs)
- Ian Rickson for Hamlet (Young Vic)

==== Longlisted ====
- Benedict Andrews for Three Sisters (Young Vic)
- Lucy Bailey for Uncle Vanya (The Print Room)
- Tom Cairns for Scenes from an Execution (Lyttelton Theatre)
- Marianne Elliott for The Curious Incident of the Dog in the Night-time (Cottesloe Theatre)
- Polly Findlay for Antigone (Lyttelton Theatre)
- Sean Foley for The Ladykillers (Gielgud)
- Jeremy Herrin for This House (Cottesloe Theatre)
- Jonathan Kent for Sweeney Todd (Chichester Festival and Adelphi)
- Roger Michell for Farewell to the Theatre (Hampstead)
- Lindsay Posner for Noises Off (Old Vic and Novello)
- Josie Rourke for The Recruiting Officer (Donmar Warehouse)
- Lyndsey Turner for Philadelphia, Here I Come! (Donmar Warehouse)

=== Best Actor ===
- Simon Russell Beale, Collaborators (National's Cottesloe and Olivier)
- Charles Edwards, The King's Speech (Wyndham's) and This House (National's Cottesloe)
- Adrian Lester, Red Velvet (Tricycle Theatre)
- Luke Treadaway, The Curious Incident of the Dog in the Night-time (National Cottesloe)

==== Longlisted ====
- Rupert Everett, The Judas Kiss (Hampstead)
- Laurence Fox, Our Boys (Duchess)
- David Haig, The Madness of George III (Theatre Royal Bath and Apollo)
- Douglas Hodge, Inadmissible Evidence (Donmar Warehouse)
- Alex Jennings, Collaborators (National's Cottesloe and Olivier)
- Rory Kinnear, The Last of the Haussmans (National's Lyttelton)
- Simon Paisley Day, The Taming of the Shrew (Shakespeare's Globe)
- Eddie Redmayne, Richard II (Donmar Warehouse)
- Adrian Scarborough, Hedda Gabler (Old Vic)
- Michael Sheen, Hamlet (Young Vic)
- Scott Shepherd, Gatz (Elevator Repair Service at Noël Coward)
- David Suchet, Long Day's Journey Into Night (Apollo)

=== Natasha Richardson Award for Best Actress ===
- Hattie Morahan, A Doll's House (Young Vic)
- Eileen Atkins, All That Fall (Jermyn Street)
- Cate Blanchett, Big and Small (Sydney Theatre Company for Barbican)
- Laurie Metcalf, Long Day's Journey Into Night (Apollo)

==== Longlisted ====
- Pippa Bennett-Warner, The Witness (Royal Court Upstairs)
- Eve Best, The Duchess of Malfi (Old Vic)
- Anna Chancellor, The Last of the Duchess (Hampstead)
- Anne-Marie Duff, Berenice (Donmar Warehouse)
- Mariah Gale, Three Sisters (Young Vic)
- Tamsin Greig, Jumpy (Royal Court Downstairs and Duke of York's)
- Sally Hawkins, Constellations (Royal Court Upstairs)
- Martina Laird, Moon on a Rainbow Shawl (National's Cottesloe)
- Helen McCrory, The Last of the Haussmans (National's Lyttelton)
- Joely Richardson, The Lady from the Sea (Kingston's Rose Theatre)
- Sheridan Smith, Hedda Gabler (Old Vic)
- Imelda Staunton, Sweeney Todd (Chichester and Adelphi)

=== Ned Sherrin Award for Best Musical ===
- Sweeney Todd (Chichester Festival and Adelphi)
- Singin’ In the Rain (Chichester Festival and Palace Theatre)
- Swallows and Amazons (A Bristol Old Vic production, presented by the National Theatre and The Children's Touring Partnership at the Vaudeville Theatre)

==== Longlisted ====
- Floyd Collins (Southwark Playhouse)
- Mack & Mabel (Southwark Playhouse)
- Top Hat (Aldwych)

=== Best Design ===
- Soutra Gilmour, Inadmissible Evidence (Donmar Warehouse) and Antigone (National's Olivier)
- Miriam Buether, Wild Swans (A Young Vic/American Repertory Theatre/Actors Touring Company co-production)
- Ian MacNeil, A Doll's House (Young Vic)

==== Longlisted ====
- Hildegard Bechtler, Top Hat (Aldwych)
- Bunny Christie, The Curious Incident of the Dog in the Night-time (National's Cottesloe)
- Kevin Depinet, Detroit (National's Cottesloe)
- Es Devlin, The Master and Margarita (Complicite at Barbican)
- Richard Kent, Richard II (Donmar Warehouse)
- Peter McKintosh, Noises Off (Old Vic)
- Vicki Mortimer, The Last of the Haussmans (National's Lyttelton)
- Lucy Osborne, The Recruiting Officer (Donmar Warehouse)
- Michael Taylor, The Ladykillers (Gielgud)
- Jamie Vartan, Misterman (National's Lyttelton)

=== Charles Wintour Award for Most Promising Playwright ===
- Lolita Chakrabarti, Red Velvet (Tricycle)
- John Hodge, Collaborators (National's Cottesloe)
- Tom Wells, Kitchen Sink (Bush)

==== Longlisted ====
- Stephen Beresford, The Last of the Haussmans (National's Lyttelton)
- Ishy Din, Snookered (Bush Theatre and Oldham Coliseum Theatre co-production)
- Vickie Donoghue, Mudlarks (Bush)
- Nancy Harris, Our New Girl (Bush)
- Luke Norris, Goodbye to All That (Royal Court Upstairs)
- Nicholas Pierpan, You Can Still Make a Killing (Southwark Playhouse)
- Tim Price, Salt, Root and Roe (Trafalgar Studios)
- Hayley Squires, Vera Vera Vera (Royal Court Upstairs and Theatre Local Peckham)

=== Milton Shulman Award for Outstanding Newcomer ===
- Matthew Tennyson, Making Noise Quietly (Donmar Warehouse)
- Denise Gough, Our New Girl (Bush) and Desire Under the Elms (Lyric Hammersmith)
- Abby Rakic-Platt, Vera Vera Vera (Royal Court Upstairs and Theatre Local Peckham)

==== Longlisted ====
- Jonathan Bailey, South Downs (Chichester Minerva and the Harold Pinter)
- David Fynn, She Stoops to Conquer (National's Olivier)
- Cush Jumbo, She Stoops to Conquer (National's Olivier)
- Joshua Williams, Shivered (Southwark Playhouse) and Love and Information (Royal Court Upstairs)
- Emi Wokoma, Soul Sister (Hackney Empire and Savoy)

=== Beyond Theatre Award ===
- Danny Boyle and his creative team, for the Opening Ceremony of the London 2012 Olympics

=== Lebedev Special Award ===
- Nicholas Hytner, for his dynamic directorship of the National Theatre

=== Editor's Award ===
- David Hare, for his contribution to theatre

=== Burberry Award for Emerging Director ===
- Simon Godwin

=== Moscow Art Theatre's Golden Seagull Award ===
- Judi Dench, for her contribution to world theatre

== Judges ==
- Henry Hitchings (London Evening Standard)
- Georgina Brown (Mail on Sunday)
- Susannah Clapp (The Observer)
- Libby Purves (The Times)
- Charles Spencer (The Daily Telegraph)
- Matt Wolf (The International Herald Tribune)
- Sarah Sands (London Evening Standard)
- Evgeny Lebedev (London Evening Standard)
