= Wokoma =

Wokoma is a surname. Notable people with the surname include:

- Emi Wokoma (born 1983/84), British actress
- Inye Wokoma (borm 1968/69), American artist
- Susan Wokoma (born 1987), British actress, writer and director
