= Woof (album) =

Studio album by Fat Dog
- Released: 6 September 2024
- Genres: Dance-punk; industrial; IDM; post-punk; synth-pop
- Length: 33:03
- Label: Domino
- Producer: James Ford

Fat Dog chronology
Woof (2024)	Cancel Me (I'm Tired) (2026)

Singles from Woof
- 1. "King of the Slugs" Released: 21 August 2023; 2. "All the Same" Released: 22 February 2024; 3. "Running" Released: 22 April 2024; 4. "I Am the King" Released: 3 June 2024; 5. "Wither" Released: 15 July 2024

Woof (stylised as WOOF.) is the debut studio album by British band, Fat Dog. The album was released on 6 September 2024 through Domino.

== Background and recording ==
Fat Dog formed as a band in 2020 during the COVID-19 lockdowns. As lockdowns eased into 2021 and 2022, the band became known for their eccentric live shows, garnering a following prior to their first songs. In 2023, they signed to Domino Recording Company, where they began to start writing and recording the debut album.

== Release and promotion ==
The band's first single, "King of the Slugs", was released in August 2023. The song, a seven minute long track combining punk and techno music, was co-produced by Love and James Ford, and was accompanied by a music video directed by Dylan Coates. The song was named at number 33 on NME's list of the best 50 songs of 2023. A follow-up single, "All The Same", was released in January 2024, accompanied by a music video featuring Neil Bell. A remixed version of All The Same by Mandy, Indiana was released the following month.

The band's third single, "Running", was released on 22 April 2024, which corresponded with the announcement of the debut album. Two additional singles during the summer were released: "I Am the King" and "Wither".

== Critical reception ==
Professional ratings
Aggregate scores
Source	Rating
AnyDecentMusic?	7.1/10
Metacritic	75/100
Review scores
Source	Rating
Allmusic	4.5/5 stars
Clash	8/10
DIY	5/5 stars
The Guardian	3/5 stars
Mojo	3/5 stars
NME	5/5 stars
Paste	7.4/10
Pitchfork	5.7/10
The Quietus	4/5 stars
Under The Radar	7.5/10 stars

Liam Martin, writing for Allmusic, praised the album, giving it four-and-a-half out of five stars. Martin said that the band's "reputation as London's craziest live act is not overexaggerated — the fact that they've managed to capture that energy on record is exhilarating." Martin further said of the album that the band has "bottled the spirit of chaos that has been haunting the masses in these uncertain times, catalyzing it into something that can be collectively expunged."

Ben Tipple of NME gave WOOF. a five-star rating praising its originality and instrumentation. Tipple said of the album "is the end to any conversation that originality in music is dead." Tipple went on to say the WOOF. is "also proof that everything but the kitchen sink can come together when placed in the right hands." Tipple summarized the album "as barbaric as it is chaotic, there’s somehow and inexplicitly an order to things that the album’s dystopian nightmare fuel perfectly hinges on. It’s unhinged, disturbing, and certainly not a relaxing listen, brimming instead with the live energy that the band are increasingly renowned for. ‘WOOF.’ is brilliant, dark, and downright batshit crazy."

In a more mixed review, Shaad D'Souza, writing for The Guardian awarded the album three stars out of five. D'Souza felt the album felt too similar to the eccentric nature that many artists are attempting to do in 2024. D'Souza said of WOOF. that it "arrives at the end of a summer that saw Kesha release the antagonistic klezmer-pop internet hit Joyride; flamboyant NYC dance-punk revivalists Model/Actriz tear through the festival circuit; and their scene compatriot the Dare get a career boost via prime placement on Charli XCX's Brat. Closer to home, Dublin’s Gilla Band broke through in 2022 with Most Normal, an arresting and discombobulating mix of club rat sneer and crust punk snarl. Forgive Woof, then, for sounding a little trite."

Pitchfork writer, Madison Bloom, also gave WOOF. a mixed review, believing that the album felt too polished and calculated. Bloom said that WOOF. "slumps right in a tepid puddle, weighed down by gimmicks, cheap irony, and unearned mythology. Rather than stoking rapture or rage, it prods with hollow indifference. More a whimper than a woof." Bloom awarded the album a 5.7 out of 10.

== Track listing ==
All tracks are written by Joe Love, except "Vigilante", lyrics co-written by Chris Hughes.

No.	Title	Length
1.	"Vigilante"	3:20
2.	"Closer to God"	3:46
3.	"Wither"	4:11
4.	"Clowns"	2:42
5.	"King of the Slugs"	7:05
6.	"All the Same"	2:55
7.	"I Am the King"	3:03
8.	"Running"	5:17
9.	"And So It Came to Pass"	0:44
Total length:		33:03

== Personnel ==
- Joe Love – lead vocals and guitar
- Chris Hughes – synthesiser, keyboards and Ableton programmer
- Morgan Wallace – saxophone and keyboards (backing vocals on "Clowns")
- Ben Harris – bass guitar
- Johnny "Doghead" Hutch – drum kit and percussion
- Neil Bell – spoken words on "Vigilante" and "And So It Came to Pass"

Production

- Producer – James Ford
- Co-producers – Joe Love and Jimmy Robertson

== Charts ==
Chart performance for Woof
Chart (2024)	Peak position
Belgian Albums (Ultratop Flanders)	102
Belgian Albums (Ultratop Wallonia)	183
Scottish Albums (Official Charts)	5
UK Albums (Official Charts)	16
UK Independent Albums (Official Charts)	1
