= Emi Wokoma =

Nigerian-British actress

- Born: Tamunoemi Wokoma; Nigeria
- Education: Guildford School of Acting & The Brit School
- Occupation: Actress
- Years active: 1999–present
- Relatives: Susan Wokoma (sister)

Tamunoemi "Emi" Wokoma is a Nigerian -British actress. She began her professional acting and singing career in her teens and has gone on to appear in productions including Cabaret, Golden Girls, Hello, Dolly!, Hairspray and Little Shop of Horrors. In 2012, she was cast as Tina Turner in Soul Sister, which earned her a nomination for the WhatsOnStage Award for Best Actress in a Musical at their 2013 ceremomy, as well as being nominated for the Outstanding Newcomer accolade at the 2012 Standard Theatre Awards. Wokoma has also appeared in television series, including Casualty, Doctors and EastEnders as Daphne Fox.

== Life and career ==
Tamunoemi Wokoma was born in the 1980s in Nigeria. Her parents are Kalabari & Nembe from Rivers State in southern Nigeria. Her mother and her father were civil servants and worked in the Home Office. Wokoma's father died in 2012 and her mother in 2025. She also has a sister, fellow actress Susan Wokoma. The family moved to England as a child and spent time in Peckham, London, specifically on the now demolished North Peckham Estate. She then lived in Canary Wharf in the London Borough of Tower Hamlets. Aged 9, she began singing, later joining the BRIT School aged 14. Aged 17, she sang in a motown band, before studying at the Guildford School of Acting. Wokoma is also a trained fitness instructor. Away from her acting, she has worked as group exercise instructor and competed as a professional bodybuilder, having represented the UK at the Arnold Sports Festival.

After beginning her stage career in 1999, Wokoma made numerous appearances in various productions including Cabaret as Sally Bowles, Golden Girls, Much Ado About Nothing, The Merry Widow, Is There Life After High School? and Hello, Dolly!, amongst others. In 2008, she made her television debut in the BBC Three sitcom Trexx and Flipside. In 2010, she appeared in an episode of the BBC soap opera EastEnders. She portrayed Daphne Fox, the sister of established characters Denise Fox (Diane Parish) and Kim Fox (Tameka Empson). A year later, she appeared in fellow BBC series Casualty as a psychiatric nurse.

In 2012, Wokoma was cast as Tina Turner in Soul Sister. Critics praised her portrayal of Turner, with The Guardian's Michael Hann writing that "stardom surely awaits" for Wokoma. Henry Hitchings, in his review for The Evening Standard, wrote: "the words "a star is born" can be hazardous, but Emi Wokoma, who plays Tina Turner in this 'bio-musical', is blessed with star quality and a voice that's rawly emotional yet also regal". Laura Thompson for The Daily Telegraph highlighted her, writing: "Wokoma is amazing, a strong-bodied yet vulnerable goddess. Singing fearlessly, and almost continually, she does a fine imitation of Tina Turner – that teetering sideways lean, those sexy washer-woman arms – but her performance goes way beyond the 'Tonight, Matthew, I will be...' of Stars in Their Eyes." The role earned her a nomination for the WhatsOnStage Award for Best Actress in a Musical at their 2013 ceremomy, as well as being nominated for the Outstanding Newcomer accolade at the 2012 Standard Theatre Awards.

In 2015, Wokoma appeared in an episode of the BBC medical drama series Holby City. Following this, she made two appearances in fellow BBC series Doctors, in 2016 and 2017, respectively. In 2022, she appeared in another episode of Casualty, in a different role.

== Stage ==
| Year | Title | Role | Ref. |
|---|---|---|---|
| 1999 | Street Dance Productions | Singer | |
| 2002 | Cabaret | Sally Bowles | |
| 2003 | Golden Girls | Muriel Farr | |
| 2004 | Much Ado About Nothing | Beatrice | |
| 2005 | The Merry Widow | Anna | |
| 2005 | Is There Life After High School? | Homecoming Queen | |
| 2005 | Hello, Dolly! | Dolly Levi | |
| 2005 | The Mystery of Edwin Drood | Princess Puffer | |
| 2006 | Titanic | Charlotte Cardoza | |
| 2006 | Dancing in the Streets | Gladys Knight / Tammi Tarrell | |
| 2006 | Porgy and Bess | Unknown | |
| 2007 | Mass Carib | Singer | |
| 2007–2008 | The Bacchae | Bacchae | |
| 2009, 2011 | Drive Ride Walk | J'Naysha | |
| 2009 | One Dark Night | Unknown | |
| 2009 | Hairspray | Cindy Watkins | |
| 2010 | Little Shop of Horrors | Ronette | |
| 2012–2013 | Soul Sister | Tina Turner | |
| 2013 | Blues in the Night | The Woman | |
| 2013 | The Tina Turner Experience | Tina Turner | |
| 2014 | Memphis to Motown | Lead Vocalist | |

== Filmography ==
| Year | Title | Role | Notes |
|---|---|---|---|
| 2008 | Trexx and Flipside | Chinaza | Main role |
| 2010 | EastEnders | Daphne Fox | Guest role |
| 2011, 2022 | Casualty | Jackie Thornbury / Chase Coleman | 2 episodes |
| 2015 | Holby City | Talesha Chambers | Episode: "When a Man Loves a Woman" |
| 2016–2017 | Doctors | Jackie Dornan / Della Marke | 2 episodes |
| 2018 | In the Long Run | Lady in Launderette | Guest role |
| 2020 | Jingle Jangle: A Christmas Journey | Gustafson Gate Guard | Film |
| 2021-2023 | Lagging | Judith | Recurring role |

== Awards and nominations ==
| Year | Organisation | Category | Nominated work | Result | Ref. |
|---|---|---|---|---|---|
| 2012 | Standard Theatre Awards | Outstanding Newcomer | Soul Sister | Nominated | |
| 2013 | WhatsOnStage Awards | Best Actress in a Musical | Soul Sister | Nominated | |
