= Chubby Funny =

- Directed by: Harry Michell
- Written by: Harry Michell
- Produced by: Ahmad Ahmadzadeh; Vanessa Ford; Samuel Hyatt-Twynam; Kevin Loader; Roger Michell; Sophie Reynolds; Johan Schiller; Helen Simmons
- Starring: Harry Michell; Augustus Prew; Isabella Laughland; Asim Chaudhry; Alice Lowe; Olivia Ross; Julian Rhind-Tutt; Anna Maxwell Martin
- Cinematography: Craig Dean Devine
- Edited by: Dylan Holmes Williams
- Production companies: Guinea Pig Productions; Free Range Films; Aimimage Productions
- Release dates: 28 September 2016 (Dinard Festival of British Cinema); 30 June 2017
- Running time: 89 minutes

Chubby Funny is a 2016 British comedy-drama film, directed and written by Harry Michell. Michell also stars in the film alongside Augustus Prew and Isabella Laughland. The film premiered at LOCO London Comedy Film Festival at BFI Southbank on Saturday 6 May 2017. It was produced by Free Range Films, Aimimage Productions and Guinea Pig Productions.

== Plot ==
Oscar is an aspirational young actor living with his friend and fellow-thespian Charlie. Their twenty-something friendship dynamic is put under strain when Charlie lands a part in a Shakespeare play while Oscar endures a succession of less-than-glamorous role offers and a part-time job as a door-to-door paid fundraiser. Oscar's family life is depicted as unstable and competitive while his love life puts his friendship under more strain as a potential girlfriend chooses the consistently fortunate Charlie over him. Rejecting the support and romantic advances from his friend Sophie casts Oscar in a dim light although his efforts to assist a local shop keeper clean up his store after an attack by vandals acts as a meaningful act of redemption. Oscar and Charlie decide to move out of the shared flat although and in doing so may save their friendship. It is left open ended as to whether Oscar will continue acting having been typecast as the 'chubby funny' sort which he is initially resentful of although the film ends with a job offer.

== Cast ==
- Harry Michell as Oscar
- Augustus Prew as Charlie
- Isabella Laughland as Sophie
- Jeff Rawl as Michael
- Jack Cooper Stimpson as Peter
- Maggie Michell as Lauren
- Johan Schiller as Jack
- David Bamber as Mr. White
- Asim Chaudhry as Arash
- Phoebe Nicholls as Aunty Jane
- Dave Benson Phillips as Babatunde
- Pierre Novellie as Greg
- Ben Kavanagh as Felix
- Hugh Stubbins as Tony
- Paul Adeyefa as Johnny
- Simon Alcock as Sophie's Date
- Alice Lowe as Susan
- Ahmad Ahmadzadeh as Cabby
- Anna Maxwell Martin as Sally
- Julian Rhind-Tutt as Director

== Production ==
Chubby Funny is directed by Harry Michell who also wrote and stars in the film. It is his debut feature as a director and was produced through Aimimage Productions, along with Free Range Films and Guinea Pig Productions. They claimed that for the low budget comedy their production base was a pub.

== Soundtrack ==
Chubby Funny's soundtrack is notable for the use of Franz Schubert's Symphony No. 4 in C minor throughout as an underscore. This also becomes a device in Oscar's developing relationship with the shop keeper as they debate which symphony is being played on the radio in the newsagents.

The filmmakers also included a number of young British artists in the film including Hannah Heartshape, Joyshop and Xylaroo.

== Release ==
Chubby Funny received its official UK premiere at the LOCO Comedy Film Festival on the 6 May 2017. The film also screened at East End Film Festival on 16 June 2017 and was in competition at Dinard Film Festival 2016. It was released in select cinemas on 30 June 2017 including Picturehouse Central in London and at the Glasgow Film Theatre. It was also shown at Kinokulture cinema in Shropshire, the Errol Flynn Filmhouse in Northampton, and at Latitude Festival.

== Reception ==
Chubby Funny was met with a positive critical response and award nominations.

- Peter Bradshaw of The Guardian called it a "terrifically funny post-Withnail satire"
- Jamie Graham of Total Film described it as “a potent cocktail of mirth and melancholy".
- Time Out said of Oscar that "he’ll make you cringe and concur in equal measure"
- Harry Michell's debut feature earned him a nomination for 'Most Promising Newcomer' in the British Independent Film Awards 2017.
