= Isabella Laughland =

English actress (born 1991)

- Born: Isabella India Jane Laughland; 1991 (age 34–35); Hammersmith, London, England
- Occupation: Actor
- Years active: 2009–present

Isabella India Jane Laughland (born 1991) is a British actress. She began her career in the Harry Potter films Half Blood Prince (2009) and Deathly Hallows: Part 1 (2010) and Part 2 (2011). She went on to star in Urban Hymn (2015) and Chubby Funny (2016). Her other films include Now Is Good (2012), Slaughterhouse Rulez (2018), Film Stars Don't Die in Liverpool (2017), and Good Luck to You, Leo Grande (2022).

On television, she is known for her roles in the Black Mirror episode "Fifteen Million Merits" (2011), the BBC Two comedy-drama Trigonometry (2020), and the Channel 5 miniseries Anne Boleyn (2021). She also had recurring roles in the Channel 4 drama Chimerica (2019), the BBC One sitcom Ghosts (2019) and drama Four Lives (2022), and a voice role in The Dark Crystal: Age of Resistance (2019) on Netflix. She portrays the role of Brother Constant in the Apple TV+ series Foundation (2024).

Laughland is a regular performer on stage, starring in the National Theatre productions of Greenland (2011) and The Last of the Haussmans (2012). In 2010, she was nominated for Outstanding Newcomer at the Evening Standard Theatre Awards for her performance in Wanderlust at the Royal Court Theatre.

== Early life and education ==
Laughland was born in 1991 in West London to Welsh television director Nick Laughland (1951–2020) and casting director Nadira Seecoomar, who is of Indo-Guyanese heritage. Seecoomar's father had arrived in England from Guyana in 1962 as part of the Windrush generation. Laughland was raised in Twickenham, South West London with her older brother Oliver, now a reporter for The Guardian.

As a teenager, Laughland participated in a drama group hosted each Saturday by the Young Blood Theatre Company at the Riverside Studios, Hammersmith. However, her mother insisted that she take her GCSEs before going into acting. Laughland further developed her acting skills through the National Youth Theatre.

== Career ==
Laughland made her television debut in a 2009 episode of the E4 sitcom The Inbetweeners. She was 16 when she was cast as Leanne in Harry Potter and the Half-Blood Prince, marking her feature film debut in 2009. She would reprise her role in the final two Harry Potter films Harry Potter and the Deathly Hallows: Part 1 (2010) and Part 2 (2011).

Also in 2010, Laughland made her professional stage debut in Nick Payne's Wanderlust at the Royal Court Theatre, for which she was nominated for Outstanding Newcomer at the Evening Standard Theatre Awards. She then appeared in the Black Mirror episode "Fifteen Million Merits" on Channel 4 and the teen film Now Is Good, and starred in the National Theatre productions of Greenland and The Last of the Haussmans.

Laughland starred in the 2015 and 2016 films Urban Hymn and Chubby Funny. For her performance in the former, Laughland was longlisted for the British Independent Film Award for Most Promising Newcomer. She led Pride and Prejudice opposite James Northcote at the Sheffield Crucible. In 2017, she played Vanessa in the film Film Stars Don't Die in Liverpool in a cast that included Annette Bening, Julie Walters, Stephen Graham, and Vanessa Redgrave.

In 2021, Laughland starred in the Channel 5 Tudor thriller Anne Boleyn as “Lizzie” (Elizabeth Browne, Countess of Worcester), lady-in-waiting to Anne Boleyn.

In 2022, she played the role of China in the BBC One four-part true crime drama Four Lives alongside Stephen Merchant and Sheridan Smith.

== Filmography ==
=== Film ===
Year	Title	Role	Notes
2009	Harry Potter and the Half-Blood Prince	Leanne	
2010	Harry Potter and the Deathly Hallows: Part 1	Leanne	
2011	Harry Potter and the Deathly Hallows: Part 2	Leanne	
2012	National Theatre Live: The Last of the Haussmans	Summer	Live streaming theatre
2012	Now Is Good	Beth	
2015	Urban Hymn	Leanne Dixon	
2016	Sarah Chong Is Going to Kill Herself	Intern	Short film
2016	Chubby Funny	Sophie	
2017	Smear	Anna	Short film
2017	Film Stars Don't Die in Liverpool	Vanessa	Uncredited
2018	Unexpected Item	Nicky	Short film
2018	Slaughterhouse Rulez	Kay	
2018	Mercury	Al	Short film
2021	Reset the Stage	Bee	Short (monologue)
2022	Good Luck to You, Leo Grande	Becky	
2026	Finding Emily	Freya	

=== Television ===
Year	Title	Role	Notes
2009	The Inbetweeners	Louise Graham	Episode: "Will's Birthday"
2009	10 Minute Tales	Hotel Check Out Girl	Episode: "Syncing"
2009	That Mitchell and Webb Look	Various	1 episode
2011	Without You	Beth	1 episode
2011	Black Mirror	Swift	Episode: "Fifteen Million Merits"
2012	The Hollow Crown	The Queen's Serving Lady	Episode: "Richard II"
2013	Coming Up	Teresa	Episode: "Henry"
2014	Comedy Feeds	Taylor	Episode: "In Deep"
2015	Lewis	Gina Doran	Series 9, 2 episodes: "Magnum Opus: Parts 1 & 2"
2017	Liam Williams' Valentine	Claire	TV Short
2018	Settling	Anna	6 episodes
2019	Chimerica	Alex Sguerra	3 episodes
2019	Criminal: UK	McRae	Episode: "Jay"
2019	The Dark Crystal: Age of Resistance		Voice role; 10 episodes
2020	Ghosts	Clare	2 episodes
2020	Trigonometry	Moira Moi	7 episodes
2021	Anne Boleyn	Elizabeth Browne	3 episodes
2022	Four Lives	China	3 episodes
2023	Foundation	Brother Constant	6 episodes
2024	The Road Trip	Deb	Main role
2025	Surface	Claire	

== Stage ==
Year	Title	Role	Director	Venue	Ref.
2010	Wanderlust	Michelle	Simon Godwin	Royal Court Theatre	
2011	Greenland	Lisa	Bijan Sheibani	National Theatre	
2012	The Last of the Haussmans	Summer	Howard Davies	National Theatre	
2013	Hard Feelings	Viv	James Hiller	Finborough Theatre	
2013	The Same Deep Water As Me	Isabella Reynolds	John Crowley	Donmar Warehouse	
2013	King Lear	Cordelia	Angus Jackson	Chichester Festival Theatre,	
2015	Pride and Prejudice	Elizabeth Bennett	Tamara Harvey	Crucible Theatre	
2015	A Further Education	Lydia	Caitlin McLeod	Hampstead Theatre	
2016	BU21	Izzy	Dan Pick	Trafalgar Theatre	
2018	Cock	W	Kate Hewitt	Minerva Theatre, Chichester	
2019	Either	Ensemble	Guy Jones	Hampstead Theatre	
2020	Love, Love, Love	Rose	Rachel O'Riordan	Lyric Theatre	

== Awards and nominations ==
Year	Award	Category	Nominated work	Result	Notes	Ref.
2010	Evening Standard Theatre Awards	Outstanding Newcomer	Wanderlust, Royal Court Theatre	Nominated		
2016	British Independent Film Awards	BIFA Most Promising Newcomer	Urban Hymn	Longlisted		
2018	Festival Européen du Film Court de Nice	Prix d'interprétation feminine - Europeenne	Mercury	Won	(shared with Harriet Cains)	
