= Wait for Me (2023 film) =

British film

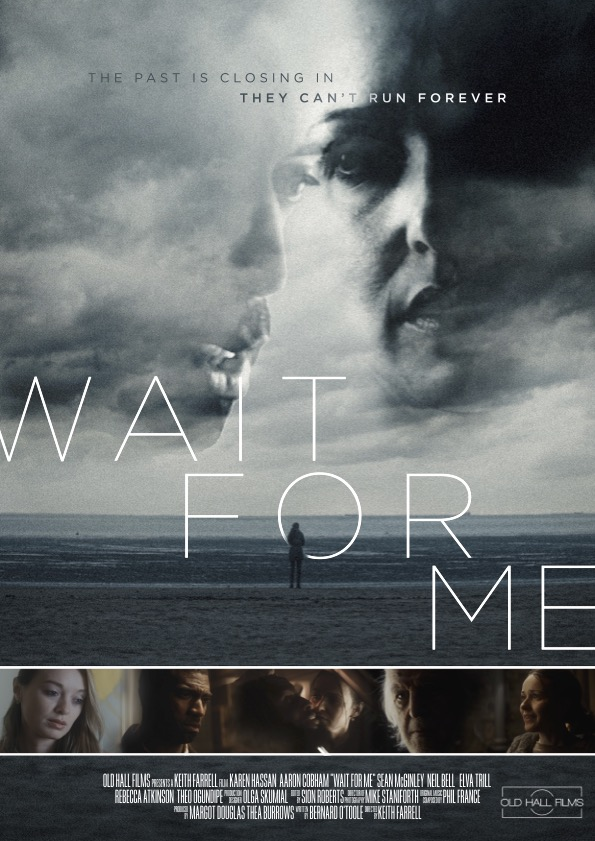
- International Release Poster
- Directed by: Keith Farrell
- Written by: Bernard O'Toole
- Produced by: Thea Burrows
- Starring: Karen Hassan; Aaron Chobham
- Cinematography: Mike Staniforth
- Edited by: Siôn Roberts
- Music by: Phil France
- Production company: Old Hall Films/Tile Media
- Distributed by: Munro Films
- Release date: 12 March 2023 (Manchester International Film Festival)
- Running time: 94 minutes
- Countries: United Kingdom; Ireland
- Language: English
- Box office: est. USD 2,102

Wait for Me is a 2023 United Kingdom-Irish co-production film, written by Bernard O'Toole and Directed by Keith Farrell, it stars Karen Hassan, Aaron Chobham, Sean McGinley and Neil Bell. The film was released in theatres on 2 June 2023.

The score was composed by Phil France, formerly of the Cinematic Orchestra.

== Synopsis ==
Set in Halifax, West Yorkshire, the film tells the story of Alison, an Irish emigrant who has fallen into a life of prostitution and drug taking, but is looking for a way out. Her father Ged, who has been forced out of their home in Northern Ireland by paramilitaries (for which the reason is never specified), now lives under the protection of local crime boss Max. Ged convinces her to keep working as a sex worker. At the brothel where she works, Alison meets Sam, a quiet, troubled photographer who has become indebted to Max and is now working as an odd job man for Max. A friendship develops between Sam and Alison. When Alison discovers that Max and his henchman Barry are trafficking young women into Yorkshire she decides to escape Halifax. Taking Sam with her she goes in search of her daughter Ruby, who is being raised by her sister Karen. Finding Karen and Ruby in Cleethorpes, she tries to re-build her relationship with her sister and daughter. As Alison struggles with her addiction, Karen is worried that Alison will go back into prostitution. Max believes unsure why Alison has disappeared believes that Alison could expose his human trafficking operation. He sends Barry, a local thug to go in search of Alison. Initially, Barry is unable to track down Alison. Under pressure from Max, Ged reveals where Karen is living and Barry goes to Cleethorpes to bring Alison back to Halifax. Sam sacrifices himself to save Alison, Karen and Ruby by claiming that Alison has stolen his money and left the seaside resort. Barry kidnaps Sam and takes him back to Halifax. Alison returns to Halifax to rescue Sam and confronts Max. In the process both her father Ged and Max are killed. In the last scene Alison is in prison and is visited by Karen and Ruby.

== Cast ==
- Karen Hassan as Alison
- Aaron Chobham as Sam
- Sean McGinley as Ged
- Neil Bell as Max
- Elva Trill as Karen
- Theo Ogundipe as Barry
- Rebecca Atkinson as Lisa

== Release ==
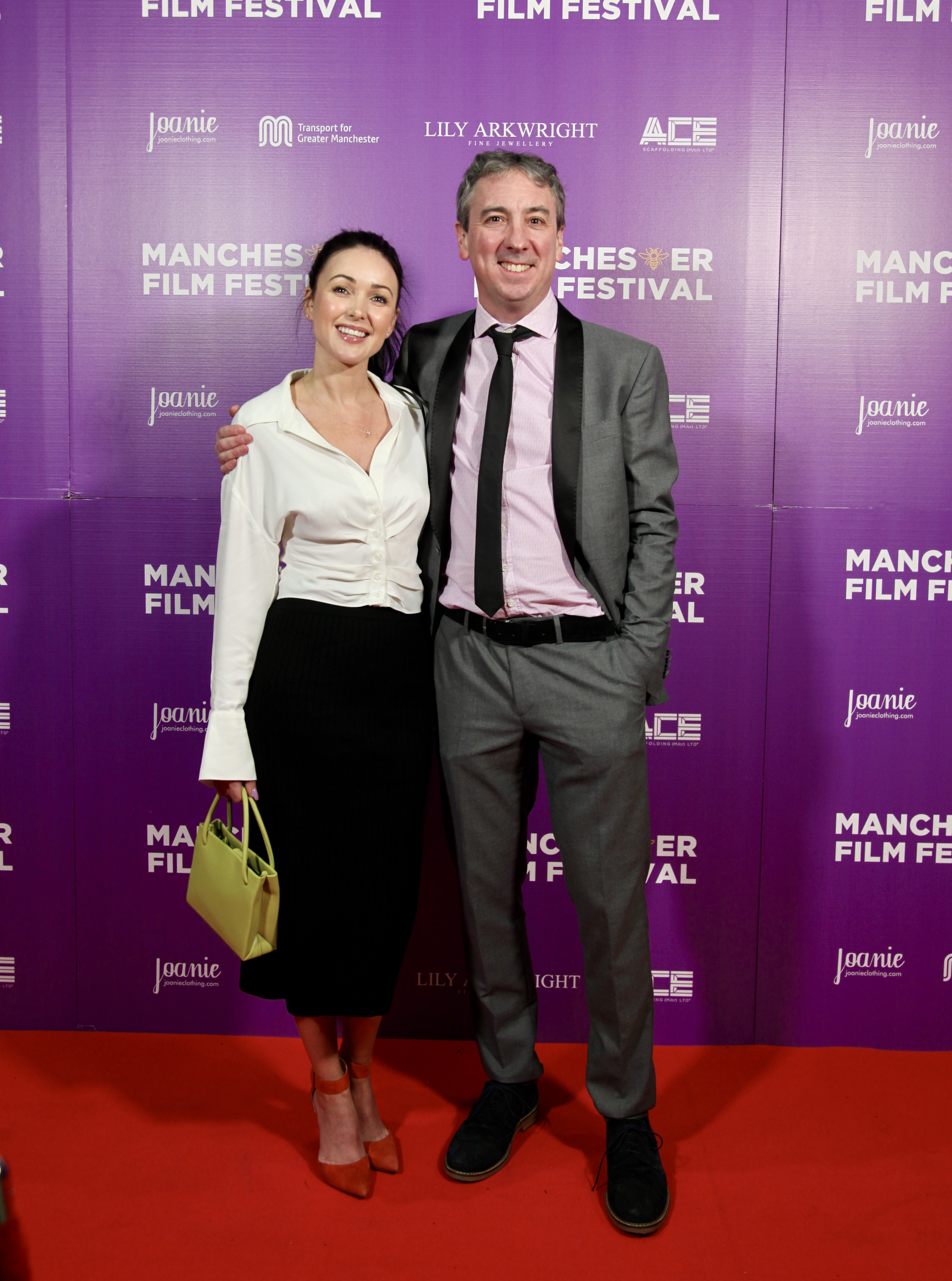
Karen Hassan & Keith Farrell at the 2023 Manchester International Film Festival

The film premiered on 12 March 2023 at the Manchester Film Festival in the UK where Keith Farrell won the Best Director award. On the back of the film's success at Manchester, Screen Daily announced that film had picked up a distribution deal in the UK. The film was released in UK and Irish cinemas on 2 June 2023.

== Critical reception ==
Matt Looker from Total Film awarded the film three out of five stars and described the film as "a poignant – if slightly contrived – tale about determination, responsibility and facing your demons"." The People's Movies, gave the film four stars out of five and praised the "myriad of great performances" from the cast. While praising the performance of Aaron Cobham, "The Irish News" found the film a "grim grind" but with "decent performances to enjoy too". "The Guardian", awarded it two stars but praised Karen Hassan for her "terrific screen presence". The "RTÉ Guide" gave the film four stars describing it as a "very impressive feature debut."
