= Fat Dog =

English band

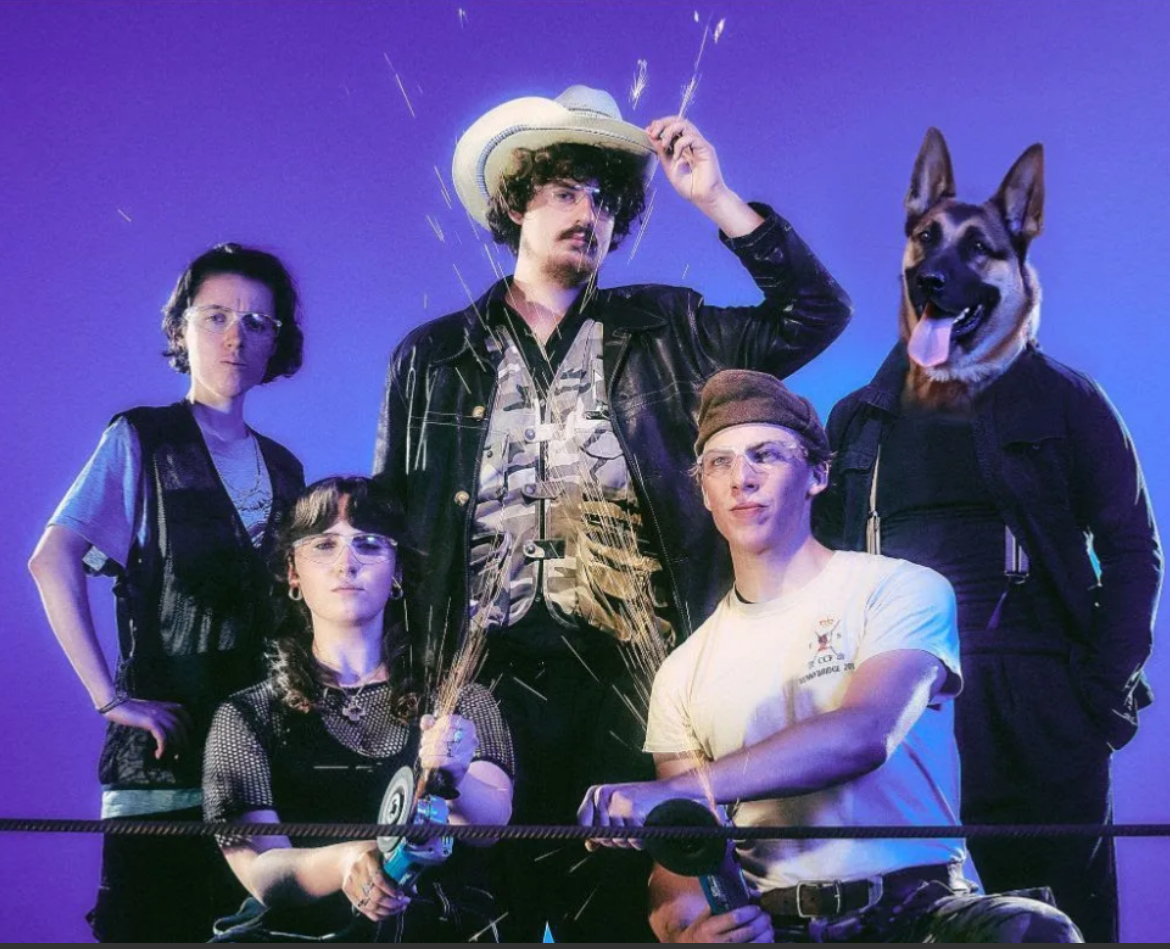
- L-R Morgan Wallace, Jacqui Wheeler, Joe Love, Chris Hughes and Johnny ‘Doghead’ Hutch

Background information
- Origin: South London, England
- Genres: New rave, dance-punk revival, windmill scene
- Years active: 2020–present
- Label: Domino Recording Company
- Members: Joe Love; Chris Hughes; Morgan Wallace; Ellis Dickson; Michael Dunlop; Dillon Harrison; Jed Bevington
- Past members: Johnny ‘Doghead’ Hutch; Jacqui Wheeler; Jazz Grant; Will Cox
- Website: fatdogfatdogfatdog.com

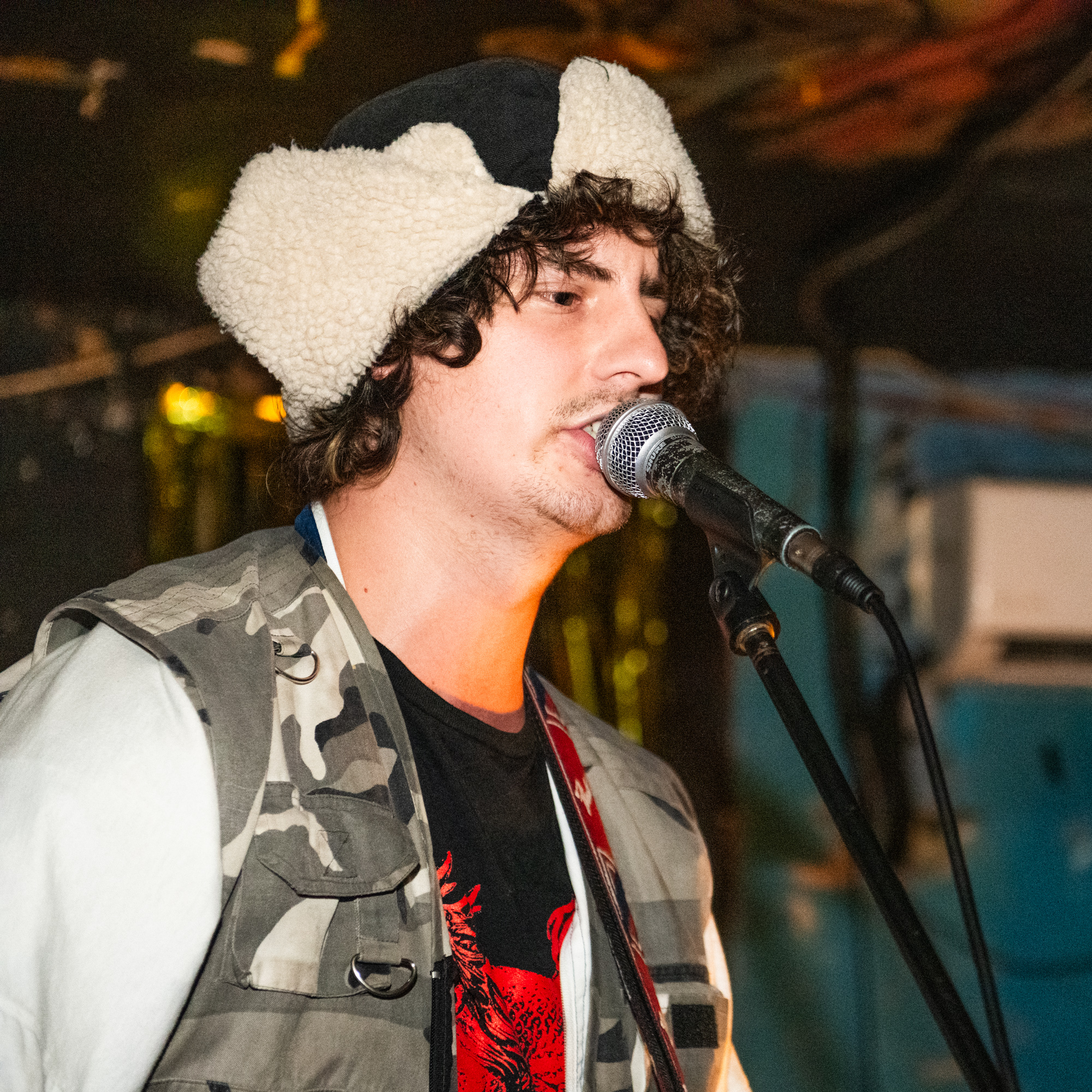
Joe Love of Fat Dog at the Windmill, Brixton, February 2023

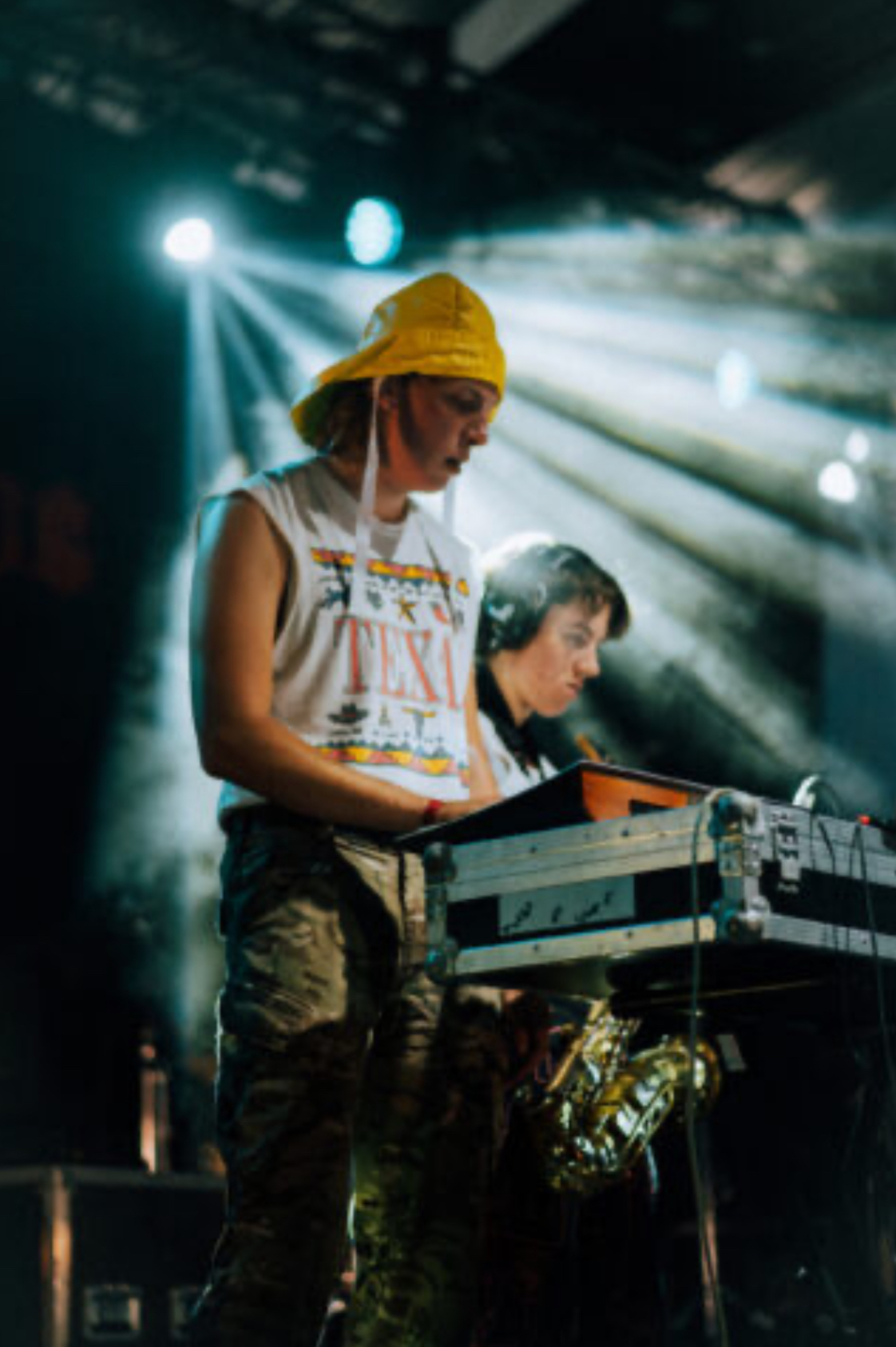
Chris Hughes (left) on analogue synth and Morgan Wallace (right) with her saxophone performing at SXSW 2024

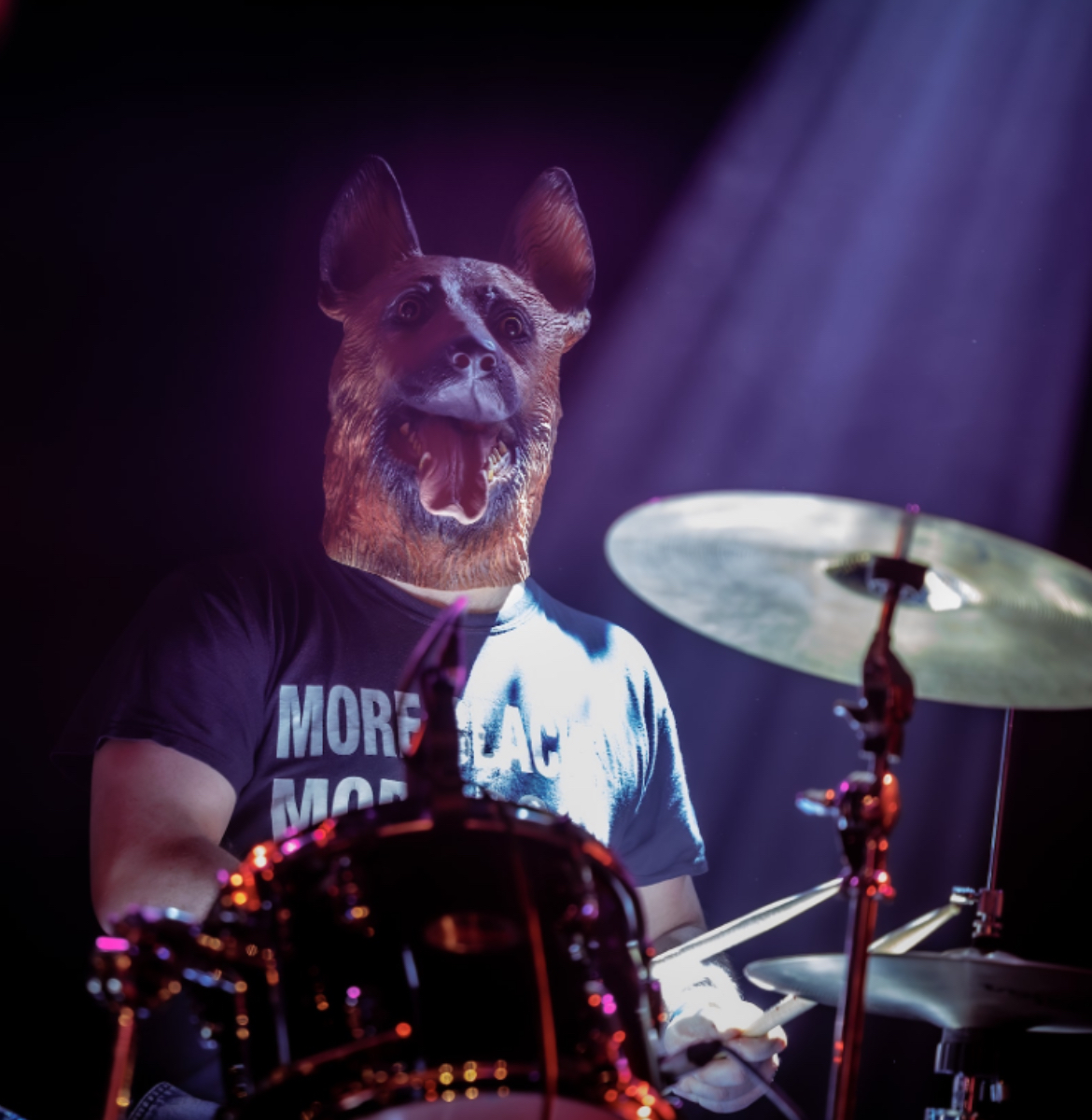
Johnny ‘Doghead’ Hutch on drum kit donning ‘More Blacks More Dogs More Irish’ t-shirt

Fat Dog are an English band, currently consisting of Joe Love, Chris Hughes, Morgan Wallace, and Ellis D. The band formed in 2020 in South East London.

== Music career ==
Fat Dog was formed during the COVID-19 lockdowns. Prior to releasing any singles, the band became known for their boisterous live performances, with Gary Ryan of NME describing them as "2023's wildest live band". In 2023, they signed to Domino Recording Company. They opened for bands such as Viagra Boys and Yard Act, and sold out Scala on their debut headline tour. They were named part of DIY Magazine's "Class of 2024" and performed at its launch show that year.

The band's first single, "King of the Slugs", was released in August 2023. The song, a seven minute long track combining punk and techno music, was co-produced by Love and James Ford, and was accompanied by a music video directed by Dylan Coates. The song was named at number 33 on NME's list of the best 50 songs of 2023. A follow-up single, "All the Same", was released in January 2024, accompanied by a music video featuring Neil Bell. A remixed version of All the Same by Mandy, Indiana was released the following month.

Drummer Johnny Hutch got the nickname of "Doghead" from drumming in every gig with a latex dog mask on his head. He has stated that being autistic, it helped him overcome anxieties while playing to an audience. In September 2024, Doghead felt his time with Fat Dog had run its course and announced his departure to focus on producing & his solo project, The Bar., Artist and multi-instrumentalist, Ellis D took over drumming duties.

The band made their US debut by playing South by Southwest in 2024. They played at End of the Road Festival in 2023, again in 2026, and the Borderline Festival in Dublin in February 2024. The tour with English band Sports Team in late 2022 was the first tour featuring the current line up.

Their debut album, WOOF., was released on September 6, 2024.

== Musical influences ==
Fat Dog's music has been described as containing elements of dance, punk and klezmer; frontman Joe Love has cited the music from Serious Sam as having influenced the band's sound.

== Members ==
=== Current members ===
- Joe Love – vocals and guitar (2020–present)
- Chris Hughes – keyboards and synths (2022–present)
- Morgan Wallace – saxophone and keyboard (2022–present)
- Ellis D – drums (2024–present)
- Michael Dunlop – bass (2025–present)
- Dillon Harrison – percussion (2024–present)
- Jed Bevington – strings (2026–present)

=== Former members ===
- Jazz Grant – vocals and keys (2020–2022)
- Will Cox – keyboards and synths (2020–2022)
- Johnny "Doghead" Hutch – drums and percussion (2020–2024)
- Jacqui Wheeler – bass (2024–2025)

== Discography ==
=== Studio albums ===
List of studio albums, with selected details
Title	Details	Peak chart positions		
Title	Details	UK	BEL (FL)	SCO
Woof.	Released: 6 September 2024; Label: Domino; Formats: Cassette, CD, digital download, LP, streaming	16	102	5
Cancel Me (I'm Tired)	Released: 2 October 2026; Label: Domino; Formats: CD, digital download, LP, streaming	13	167	7

=== Singles ===
List of singles, with selected chart positions
Title	Year	Peak chart positions		Album
Title	Year	EST Air.	US Alt.	Album
"King of the Slugs"	2023	—	—	Woof.
"All the Same"	2024	—	—	Woof.
"Running"	2024	—	—	Woof.
"I Am the King"	2024	—	—	Woof.
"Wither"	2024	—	—	Woof.
"Peace Song"	2024	—	—	Non-album singles
"Pray to That"	2025	—	—	Non-album singles
"Go Fuck Urself"	2026	67	—	Cancel Me (I'm Tired)
"Cancel Me (I'm Tired)"	2026	—	—	Cancel Me (I'm Tired)
"Shit Love"	2026	66	—	Cancel Me (I'm Tired)
"Call It What You Want"	2026	—	39	Cancel Me (I'm Tired)
"Heart of Darkness"	2026	—	—	Cancel Me (I'm Tired)
"—" denotes singles which were not released in that country or failed to chart.
