= Rebecca Atkinson =

English actress

- Born: 22 September 1983 (age 42); Salford, England
- Other name: Rebecca Batt
- Occupation: Actress
- Years active: 2001–present
- Known for: Shameless
- Spouse: Ben Batt (m. 2025)
- Children: 1

Rebecca Atkinson (born 22 September 1983) is an English actress, known for portraying Karen Maguire in Shameless from 2004 until 2013.

== Early life and education ==
Atkinson studied theatre and dance at Preston College.

== Career ==
Before her television appearances, Atkinson attended the David Johnson Drama and taught dancing in Goostrey for the Glenda Ann School of Dancing.

In 2004, Atkinson began playing Karen Maguire in Channel 4's popular comedy drama series, Shameless, and appeared in all 11 series. She has also appeared in Life On Mars, Ideal and BBC Three sitcom Trexx and Flipside. In October 2016, Atkinson joined the cast of BBC Scotland soap opera, River City, as Belinda Roberts.

She has had minor parts in many shows, including playing Asia in four episodes of BBC comedy series Ideal, and two episodes of New Street Law, where she played a character named Susie Hardwick. She appeared in Heartbeat in 2002 and 2006 playing two different characters. She has also had single appearances in Life on Mars, Holby City, The Bill, Coronation Street, Doctors and The Royal. She appeared in Children's Ward. She also appeared in the film adaptation of Kevin Sampson's Awaydays, released in 2009. She has now had a role in Wait For Me (2023) playing Lisa.

== Personal life ==
Her husband is Shameless co-star, Ben Batt, who played Joe Pritchard. They met on the set in 2008, the couple have a son, Jack, born in 2016. The couple were later married in March 2025.

== Filmography ==
Film
Year	Title	Role	Notes
2001	Now You See Her	Girl	Minor role
2009	Awaydays	Sonya	
2014	Film: The Movie	Heather Cleveland	
2023	Wait for Me	Lisa	
2024	The Can	Karen	

Television
Year	Title	Role	Notes
2002-2006	Heartbeat	Linda	2 episodes
2002	Coronation Street	Stephanie Mills	3 episode
2003	The Royal	Suzanne	1 episode
2004–2013	Shameless	Karen Maguire	Series regular; 130 episodes
2005-2017	Doctors	Sharon Irvine	1 episode
2005	The Bill	Caitlin Vicars	1 episode
2006-2019	Holby City	Savanna	2 episodes
2006	Life on Mars	Tina	1 episode
2005–2006	Ideal	Asia	Recurring role; 5 episodes
2006	Heartbeat	Hayley Fenton	1 episode
2006–2007	New Street Law	Susie Hardwick	2 episodes
2008	Trexx and Flipside	Amber	1 episode
2010-2016	Moving On	Kaycee	2 episode
2014	Staff Room	Leigh	1 episode
2015	Doctors	Sadie Mawby	1 episode
2016	Moving On	Laura	1 episode
2016–2023	River City	Belinda Roberts	8 episodes
2017	Doctors	Hayley Armsden	1 episode
2019-2021	Flatmates	Erin	9 episodes
2019	Holby City	Denise Mullins	1 episode
2021	Silent Witness	Dr. Benning	1 episode
2025	Coronation Street	Mandy Waring	6 episodes
