= Preston College =

Further education college in Preston, Lancashire, England

Coordinates: 53.7839°N 2.7005°W

- Preston, Lancashire, Lancashire; England

Information
- Type: Further Education and Technical college
- Established: 1974
- Principal: Kate Wallace
- Campus: Fulwood
- Website: https://www.preston.ac.uk/

Preston College is a further education in the city of Preston, Lancashire, England. The college originally opened as W. R. Tuson College in September 1974 and was renamed Preston College on 1 September 1989.

== Campus ==
The college had two main sites until mid-2011; the main campus on St. Vincent's Road in Fulwood and a smaller building located next to Moor Park. The college finished the build of a Btec building in mid-2011 upon the Fulwood campus; the replaced the Moor Park campus.

A £5m visual and performing arts centre was opened on the Fulwood site in January 2012.

== Courses ==
The college primarily provides education in vocational subjects, but academic courses at a sixth form college level can also be undertaken.

== Notable alumni ==
- Lenny Henry re-took his O Levels at the college whilst appearing in a summer comedy show in Blackpool.
- Rebecca Atkinson studied theatre and dance at the college.
- Ashley Dalton MP studied at the college.
- Jordan North
