= Soul Sister (musical) =

Jukebox musical

Soul Sister is a jukebox musical based on the life and times of Tina Turner and Ike Turner, written by John Miller and Pete Brooks, with the original production directed by Bob Eaton.

== Productions ==
Soul Sister opened at the Hackney Empire where it played a limited run from 14 April - 5 May 2012. The production transferred at the Savoy Theatre in the West End on 23 August 2012, following previews from 20 August. It played a limited run to 29 September 2012. Emi Wokoma starred as Tina Turner, for which she was nominated for the Whatsonstage.com Award for Best Actress in a Musical. The musical was nominated for 2013 Laurence Olivier Award for Best New Musical.

The production, again starring Wokoma, toured the UK in 2013.

== Critical reception ==
Reviews for the show were mixed, although with praise for Wokoma. Henry Hitchings in his review for The Evening Standard wrote, "The words "a star is born" can be hazardous, but Emi Wokoma, who plays Tina Turner in this 'bio-musical', is blessed with star quality and a voice that's rawly emotional yet also regal...As jukebox musicals go, Soul Sister is meaty. Yet the story never soars." Laura Thompson for The Daily Telegraph highlighted the central performance, stating: "Wokoma is amazing, a strong-bodied yet vulnerable goddess. Singing fearlessly, and almost continually, she does a fine imitation of Tina Turner – that teetering sideways lean, those sexy washer-woman arms – but her performance goes way beyond the 'Tonight, Matthew, I will be...' of Stars in Their Eyes."

== See also ==
- Tina (musical)
