= Trexx and Flipside =

- Created by: Zeron Gibson
- Starring: Peter Dalton; David Ajala; Rich Fulcher; Ashley Madekwe; Tyronne Lewis; Emi Wokoma; Andrew Harrison; Marcel Mc Calla; Rebecca Atkinson
- Country of origin: United Kingdom
- No. of series: 1
- No. of episodes: 6

Production
- Producer: Juliet Charlesworth
- Running time: 30 minutes

Original release
- Network: BBC Three
- Release: 6 July – 3 August 2008

Trexx and Flipside is a multi-platform British sitcom shown as part of BBC Three's spring schedule and produced by FirstLookTV with Executive Producer Will Hanrahan. It follows the story of Trexx and Flipside, two "wannabe hip hop stars". The duo are managed by "Wu Hah Management", as shown in the first episode. The show premiered on Sunday, 6 July 2008 at 11PM.

The cast includes Rebecca Atkinson, known to British audiences for her work on Shameless. It also stars Rich Fulcher, who shot to fame as Bob Fossil in the cult TV hit The Mighty Boosh, and BBC 1Xtra DJ MistaJam as Trexx. David Ajala, who plays 'Flipside', has played Sean Campbell on Dream Team and had recently appeared in 'The Dark Knight', credited as 'Bounty Hunter #2', and appears in the scene where The Joker is brought in a bin-liner to the residence of one of the Gotham Mobsters. The show also starred Actor and musician Tyronne Lewis (EastEnders, Casualty, Teachers) as Trexx and Flipside's nemesis B-ICE.
