= Inye Wokoma =

Curator and Scholar from Seattle, Washington)

- Born: 1968 or 1969 (age 57–58); Seattle, Washington
- Education: Garfield High School
- Occupation: Artist

Inye Wokoma (born 1968 or 1969) is an artist, filmmaker, journalist, and co-founder of Wa Na Wari in Seattle, Washington.

== Early life and education ==
Wokoma was born in Seattle and grew up in Seattle's Central District and attended Garfield High School.

== Career ==
Wokoma has had two solo museum shows, including This Is Who We Are at Frye Art Museum, and An Elegant Utility at the Northwest African American Museum. His work focuses on gentrification and his family's history in Seattle.

Wokoma opened Wa Na Wari, a Black-centered arts organization and community space, in his great-aunt Birdie's house in the Central District, along with co-founders Elisheba Johnson, Jill Freidberg, and Rachel Kessler. Wa Na Wari aims at reclaiming space and supporting black artists in Seattle's historically black neighborhood, in the face of gentrification.
