= Shivered =

Shivered is a Persian heavy metal band formed in 2015 by Mohammad Maki. He is currently the sole member of the band, playing guitars, bass, drums (programmed), and vocals. However, prior to their latest record, 'Existential Mourning,' he had worked with session musicians such as Doug Ross and Arnaud Krakowka. The band has been labeled as Gothic, Progressive, and Doom Metal with hints of Rock. The band signed to independent label SenseSpirit in 2015.

== Biography ==
=== Debut EP and The beginning of the band (2015–2016) ===
Shivered was formed in 2015 by multi-instrumentalist Mohammad Maki. Previously before founding Shivered Mohammad Maki had worked on Alternative Metal band Lorn which got disbanded in 2015 due to legal issues with the band's name. In early 2015 Mohammad Maki started working on the band's debut EP " Bereaved and Gone Insane " which got released with the help of session musicians Doug Ross on the bass and Arnaud Krawokwa on Drums on May 20, 2016, the record was mixed and mastered by JARO SOUND

=== Journey to Fade and the future of the band (2017–present) ===
Shortly after releasing the debut EP, Mohammad Maki started working on the band debut full LP " Journey to Fade " with more direct connection with session musicians which helped the band get more progressive sound to it unlike the previous EP. the record was mixed and mastered by Derek Moffat from 608 Studios

The band released Journey to Fade on May 20, 2017.

By the end of 2017 Mohammad Maki on official Shivered Facebook page announced the band will go under a small hiatus due to financial issues but also said the band will release a single song in early 2018, " Disfigured Heart " released on February 20, 2018,

On 2 May 2024 Mohammad Maki officially revealed the details of the second full album ' Existential Mourning ' on bands official Instagram and Facebook page.

On September 19, 2025, Shivered's official Instagram posted a mysterious teaser ending with the text "October 2." On October 2, 2025, the page officially announced the band's third full-length concept album, " Chains ", along with the music video for the track " Ruins of Memories "

== Discography ==
Studio albums

- Journey to Fade (2017)
- Existential Mourning (2024)
- Chains (2025)

EPs

- Bereaved and Gone Insane (2016)

Singles

- Disfigured Heart (2018)

== Lyrical themes ==
Many of the band's lyrics use various aspects of psychology, death, Love, suicide and pessimism, In the band debut EP " Bereaved and Gone Insane " lyrics were more Gothic and dark such as the song " Doomsday Sun " which is about gothic love but in their debut LP " Journey to Fade " their lyrics expanded to more Psychological and pessimistic, such as the songs " Neurotic " and " The Light Tears Apart "

== Band members ==
- Mohammad Maki – Vocals, Guitar, Bass, Drums
