= World Shakespeare Festival =

Cultural festival

The World Shakespeare Festival was a programme of events about William Shakespeare and his work. They took place mostly in London and Stratford-upon-Avon as part of the 2012 Cultural Olympiad which accompanied the Olympic Games. It was produced by the Royal Shakespeare Company and sponsored by the Arts Council, BP and Lottery with about 60 participating organisations including the BBC, British Museum, National Theatre and Shakespeare's Globe.
