= Lolita Chakrabarti =

British actress and writer (born 1969)

Lolita Chakrabarti OBE
- Chakrabarti in 2022
- Born: 1969 (age 56–57); Kingston upon Hull, England
- Education: Royal Academy of Dramatic Art
- Occupations: Actress; writer
- Years active: 1990–present
- Spouse: Adrian Lester (m. 1997; div. 2024)
- Children: 2
- Relatives: Reeta Chakrabarti (sister)

Lolita Chakrabarti (born 1969) is an English actor and writer.

== Early life and education ==
Lolita Chakrabarti was born in Kingston upon Hull, England, to Bengali Hindu parents from India in 1969. She grew up in Birmingham, where her father worked as an Orthopaedic Surgeon at Selly Oak Hospital.

She was educated at the Convent of the Holy Child Jesus in Birmingham before moving to London, after being accepted at the Royal Academy of Dramatic Art, where she studied acting for three years, graduating in 1990.

== Career ==
=== Acting ===
TV Credits include Silo (Apple), Wheel of Time (Amazon), Criminal (Netflix), Vigil, Showtrial (BBC), A Casual Vacancy (BBC1/HBO), To Provide All People (BBC2), Beowulf (ITV), Jekyll and Hyde (ITV), Riviera (Sky), Numbertime (BBC). She appeared in The Bill as WPC Jamila Blake from 1996 to 1998.

Her theatre credits include Wendy and Peter Pan at the Barbican (2025), The Hunt for the Almeida at St Ann's Warehouse, New York (2024), Summer 1954 for Bath Theatre Royal and UK tour (2025), Fanny and Alexander for The Old Vic (2018), Gertrude in Hamlet starring Tom Hiddleston and directed by Kenneth Branagh for RADA (2017), The Great Game: Afghanistan for the Tricycle Theatre (2009), Last Seen - Joy for the Almeida (2009) (which she co-wrote), Free Outgoing for the Royal Court (2008), John Gabriel Borkman for the Donmar Warehouse (2007). The Waiting Room (2000) A Midsummer Night's Dream (1993) National Theatre, King Lear at Cochrane Theatre and UK Tour (1994).

Radio credits include 4 seasons of This Things of Darkness (BBC Scotland Radio 4), and Calmer (BBC3).

=== Writing ===
==== Red Velvet (2012) ====
Red Velvet, Chakrabarti's play about Ira Aldridge, an African-American actor at the centre of controversy in 1833 when he takes over from Edmund Kean in Othello at the Theatre Royal in Covent Garden, premiered in 2012 at the Tricycle Theatre, London. It returned to The Tricycle in 2014 before transferring to St. Ann's Warehouse in New York. It returned again to the Garrick Theatre in London's West End as part of Kenneth Branagh's season in 2016. Chicago Shakespeare Theater and San Diego's Old Globe Theatre presented Red Velvet in 2017–18. Red Velvet has had more than 25 productions in the United States.

The play won Chakrabarti the Charles Wintour Award for Most Promising Playwright at the 2012 Evening Standard Theatre Awards. That same year she was nominated for Best New Play and London Newcomer of the Year at the WhatsOnStage Awards. She won the award for Most Promising Playwright at the Critics' Circle Awards in January 2013 and received the AWA Award for Arts and Culture that same year. Red Velvet was also nominated for an Olivier Award in 2013.

==== The Greatest Wealth (2018) ====
In 2018, Chakrabarti curated this event for The Old Vic, London, commissioning seven monologues to celebrate the 70th Anniversary of the NHS. The season was relaunched online during the pandemic in 2020, with a new monologue written by Booker prize winning novelist Bernardine Evaristo.

==== Invisible Cities (2019) ====
Chakrabarti adapted Italo Calvino's 1972 novel Invisible Cities, in collaboration with 59 Productions, Rambert Dance Company, and Sidi Larbi Cherkaoui. Presented at Manchester International Festival and Brisbane Festival in 2019, it was reimagined as a virtual reality film named Stones of Venice for Hong Kong New Vision Festival.

==== Life of Pi (2019) ====
Chakrabarti's adaptation of Life of Pi, based on Yann Martel's 2001 novel, premiered at the Crucible Theatre, Sheffield in June 2019. Following critical acclaim, the production transferred to the Wyndham's Theatre, West End in November 2021. It went on to play around the world - ART in Boston, The Schoenfeld Theatre on Broadway, a year long US tour, a year long UK tour, Mumbai, a tour of China, a tour of South Korea. Life of Pi was nominated for 9 Olivier Award, winning 5 of them. Chakrabarti was awarded the Olivier Award for Best New Play for her work, and numerous other accolades, including a WhatsOnStage Award, UK Theatre Award and CAMEO Award. Life of Pi also won 3 Tonys, 4 UK Theatre Awards and many more.

==== A Working Diary (2020) ====
Adrian Lester and Lolita Chakrabarti: A Working Diary was published by Bloomsbury in 2020, charting a year in the working life of Chakrabarti as she was developing the stage adaptation of Life of Pi and the film of Red Velvet.

==== Hymn (2021) ====
In 2020 during the height of the pandemic Lolita's play Hymn opened at the Almeida Theatre in London. It was live streamed for seven performances in January 2021 and returned for live performances in July and August that year. An original play with music about two men who meet at a funeral and discover they are brothers. She reconfigured the play to be set in Chicago and a major new production opened at Chicago Shakespeare Theatre in 2025.

==== Hamnet (2023) ====
Chakrabarti adapted Maggie O'Farrell's award winning novel Hamnet for the highly anticipated stage version. Hamnet had its world premiere at Stratford-Upon-Avon's Swan Theatre on 1 April 2023. After its sold-out Stratford engagement closing on 17 June 2023, the show transferred to the West End's Garrick Theatre. It opened on 30 September 2023 and played until 17 February 2024. In 2026 it toured the US.

Calmer (2025)

This original piece about three generations of women in one family dealing with legacy and chaos was recorded for BBC Radio 3. Chakrabarti also starred in it playing Nina alongside Meera Syal.

==== Dramaturg ====
In 2020 Lolita was dramaturg on Message in a Bottle for Sadler's Wells Theatre and ZooNation. She also dramaturged Sylvia which played at The Old Vic in 2023. Both were created and realised by Kate Prince. Sylvia returns for a UK tour culminating in several performances at the Royal Albert Hall in 2026.

==== Other work ====
The Goddess for Woman's Hour on BBC Radio 4, Faith, Hope and Blue Charity for on BBC Radio 4,

=== Producing ===
Chakrabarti ran Lesata Productions with Rosa Maggiora. In 2011, they produced Of Mary, a short film that won the Best Short Film Award at PAFF, Los Angeles, 2012. Chakrabarti and Maggiora were nominated for the Best Producer Award at the Underwire Film Festival, London, 2011.

== Personal life ==
Chakrabarti was a visiting Torch Fellow at Oxford University in 2021.

She was appointed Officer of the Order of the British Empire (OBE) in the 2021 Birthday Honours for services to drama.

She has served on boards for RADA, Rambert and is a Creative Ambassador for The Roundhouse, The Horniman Museum, The Unicorn.

Chakrabarti is divorced from actor Adrian Lester. She has two daughters.
