= Tom Cairns =

English footballer

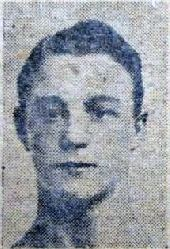

Personal information
- Full name: Thomas Cairns
- Date of birth: 1896
- Place of birth: Chopwell, England
- Date of death: 13 October 1917 (aged 21)
- Place of death: near Arras, France
- Position: Inside left

Senior career*
| Years | Team | Apps | (Gls) |
| –1913 | Chopwell Villa | | |
| 1913–1914 | Newcastle City | | |
| 1914–1917 | Newcastle United | 1 | (0) |
- * Club domestic league appearances and goals

Thomas Cairns (1896 – 13 October 1917) was an English professional footballer who played in the Football League for Newcastle United as an inside left.

== Personal life ==
Prior to joining Newcastle United, Cairns worked as a driver. He enlisted as a gunner in the Royal Field Artillery in 1915, during the First World War. Serving in 'Z' 61st Trench Mortar Battery, he saw action at Fromelles and at the Third Battle Of Ypres and rose to the rank of corporal. Cairns was killed east of Arras on 13 October 1917, during the build-up to the offensive on Cambrai. He has no known grave and is commemorated on the Arras Memorial.

== Career statistics ==
Appearances and goals by club, season and competition
| Club | Season | League | | | FA Cup | | Total | |
| Club | Season | Division | Apps | Goals | Apps | Goals | Apps | Goals |
|---|---|---|---|---|---|---|---|---|
| Newcastle United | 1914–15 | First Division | 1 | 0 | 0 | 0 | 1 | 0 |
| Career total | | | 1 | 0 | 0 | 0 | 1 | 0 |
