= Adrian Lester =

British actor (born 1968)

Adrian Lester CBE
- Lester in 2024
- Born: Anthony Harvey; 14 August 1968 (age 58); Birmingham, England
- Education: Royal Academy of Dramatic Art
- Occupation: Actor
- Years active: 1987–present
- Spouse: Lolita Chakrabarti (m. 1997; div. 2024)
- Children: 2
- Adrian Lester's voice from the BBC series Front Row, 2013

Adrian Anthony Lester CBE (born Anthony Harvey on 14 August 1968) is a British actor. He is the recipient of a Laurence Olivier Award, an Evening Standard Theatre Award and a Critics' Circle Theatre Award for his work on the London stage, and has also been nominated for a Tony Award.

== Early life and education ==
Lester was born on 14 August 1968 in Birmingham, the son of Jamaican immigrants, Monica, a medical secretary, and Reginald, a manager for a contract cleaning company. His maternal grandfather, James Lester, had arrived in the United Kingdom in 1954, followed by his wife Mabel a year later. His mother was brought up by her grandparents in Jamaica until 1960, when she joined her parents in Birmingham at the age of 14.

From the age of 9, Lester sang as a boy treble in the choir of St Chad's Cathedral, Birmingham. At 14, he began acting with the Birmingham Youth Theatre. After leaving Archbishop Masterson RC School, Lester attended Joseph Chamberlain Sixth Form College for one year, before winning a place at the Royal Academy of Dramatic Art (RADA) in 1986, at which he completed three years of training, graduating in 1989.

== Career ==
=== Theatre ===
Lester received an Ian Charleson Award commendation and a Time Out Award for his 1991 performance as Rosalind in Cheek by Jowl's all-male production of As You Like It. In 1992 he played Paul in the UK premiere of John Guare's Six Degrees of Separation, alongside Stockard Channing at the Royal Court Theatre in a production that transferred to the West End's Comedy Theatre. The following year, he appeared as Anthony Hope in the National Theatre's production of Sweeney Todd: The Demon Barber of Fleet Street, receiving an Olivier Award nomination for Best Supporting Performance in a Musical. He has also appeared on stage as Robert in the Donmar Warehouse production of the Stephen Sondheim musical Company, for which he won an Olivier Award, and in the title role of Hamlet (Carlton TV Theatre Award).

In 2003, he played the title role in Henry V at the National Theatre.

In 2010, he played the part of Brick in Tennessee Williams' play Cat on a Hot Tin Roof at the Novello Theatre in London.

In 2012, he appeared as Ira Aldridge in the play Red Velvet, written by his wife Lolita Chakrabarti.

Lester played the part of Othello in the Shakespeare play of the same name in 2013 alongside Rory Kinnear as Iago at the National Theatre. Both actors won the Best Actor award in the Evening Standard Theatre Awards for their roles; the award is traditionally given to only one actor, but the judges were unable to choose between the pair.

In 2018, he played Sky Masterson in the Royal Albert Hall production of Guys and Dolls.

In 2021, he appeared in the live-streamed production of Hymn written by his wife Lolita Chakrabarti for the Almeida Theatre. The play co-starred Danny Sapani and was performed with social distancing in place in accordance with COVID-19 restrictions.

He made his Broadway debut in the 2021 production of The Lehman Trilogy, directed by Sam Mendes. His performance earned him a Tony Award nomination.

Lester made his debut with the Royal Shakespeare Company in 2025, playing the title character in Edmond Rostand's Cyrano de Bergerac at the Swan Theatre in Stratford-upon-Avon. In January 2026, it was announced that the production would be transferring to the Noel Coward Theatre in London's West End later in the year.

=== Television ===
In 1997, Lester starred in an episode of Silent Witness. It was in a two-part episode of series two entitled "Cease upon the Midnight", where he played the part of Danny Morris. For his role in the BBC feature-length drama Storm Damage, in 2000 he was nominated for the EMMA Award for Best TV Actor.

He is known for playing a big-time con artist named Michael "Mickey Bricks" Stone on the BBC television series Hustle between 2004 and 2012. The character was written out of the fourth series and replaced by Ashley Walters, although Lester returned from the fifth series (2009) onwards.

On American television, he appeared on the sitcom Girlfriends from 2002 to 2003, as Ellis Carter, a film star who dated Tracee Ellis Ross's character, Joan Clayton.

In late 2005, he had a major guest-starring role in Channel 4's police drama The Ghost Squad.

In 2008, he starred on the BBC drama Bonekickers, a programme focusing on a team of archaeologists.

He played the character Myror in a 2009 episode of the British television drama Merlin.

In 2024, Netflix announced that Lester would play the role of Destiny of the Endless in the upcoming second season of The Sandman.

=== Film ===
Lester played campaign manager Henry Burton in Mike Nichols' film Primary Colors (1998), based on the novel by Anonymous (Joe Klein). His character is believed to represent George Stephanopoulos. This part earned him a Chicago Film Critics Association award nomination for "Most Promising Actor".

He appeared as Dumain in Kenneth Branagh's Love's Labour's Lost (2000), a musical adaptation of the William Shakespeare play, set in the 1930s. The film itself was poorly received, but Lester received a British Independent Film Awards nomination for his performance.

In The Day After Tomorrow, Lester had a small but important role as Simon, one of the three researchers who drink a toast of "twelve-year-old Scotch" shortly before freezing to death.

He filmed scenes for Spider-Man 3 (2007), as a research scientist who is sought after by the Sandman (Thomas Haden Church) to find a cure for his ailing daughter. He was seen in one teaser trailer for the film; however, his scenes were cut from the final theatrical version.

=== Other work ===
In 2010, Lester appeared in the documentary When Romeo Met Juliet together with his wife Lolita Chakrabarti as acting mentors to the pupils of two Coventry schools involved in a production of Romeo and Juliet.

He recorded Alpha Force: Survival, an audio book written by Chris Ryan. Lester was the presenter at the 2024 Royal British Legion Festival of Remembrance Festival at the Royal Albert Hall.

== Personal life ==
In 1997 Lester married actress and writer Lolita Chakrabarti, whom he met while they were both students at RADA. They lived in East Dulwich, south-east London with their two daughters. They divorced in 2024.

In 2007, Lester took part in Empire's Children, a Channel 4 documentary exploring the journey taken by the "Windrush Generation" to the United Kingdom. Lester's grandfather, Kenneth Nathaniel Lester, was to be included in the documentary, but was unwell during filming in Jamaica and could not be interviewed. Kenneth died soon after the documentary completed filming and never saw the programme aired.

In April 2013, Lester appeared on the Cultural Exchange feature of Front Row on BBC Radio 4, a feature of the programme where people had to choose a piece of art that meant a great deal to them. He chose "Redemption Song" by Bob Marley.

Lester holds a 4th Dan black belt in Moo Duk Kwan Taekwondo.

== Acting credits ==
Key
†	Denotes films that have not yet been released

=== Film ===
Year	Title	Role	Notes
1997	Les Soeurs Soleil	Isaac Nelson	
1997	Up on the Roof	Scott	
1998	Primary Colors	Henry Burton	
2000	Love's Labour's Lost	Dumaine	
2000	Maybe Baby	George	
2000	Best	Rocky	
2000	Born Romantic	Jimmy	
2001	Dust	"Edge"	
2002	The Final Curtain	Jonathan Stitch	
2004	The Day After Tomorrow	Simon	
2006	As You Like It	Oliver De Boys	
2006	Scenes of a Sexual Nature	Peter Brian "Pete" Maxwell	
2007	Spider-Man 3	Dr. Phil Wallace	Scenes deleted
2007	Starting Out in the Evening	Casey Davies	
2008	Doomsday	Sergeant Norton	
2009	Case 39	Wayne	
2013	Jimi: All Is by My Side	Michael X	
2017	Grey Lady	Julius Johnson	
2017	Euphoria	Aron	
2018	Mary Queen of Scots	Lord Randolph	
2026	Mutiny	Captain Adam Spencer	

=== Television ===
Year	Title	Role	Notes
1987	A Sort of Innocence	Dave	1 episode
1988	Boon	Fast Eddie's Staff Member	Episode: "Beef Encounter"
1991	For the Greater Good	Young Gay Man	Episode: "Member"
1992	Touch and Die	Lute	TV film
1992	The Bill	Dotun Konchella	Episode: "Just Send Some Flowers"
1995	The Affair	Ray	TV film
1996	Soldier Soldier	Mokete Malange	Episode: "Divided Loyalties"
1996	Company	Bobby	TV film
1997	Silent Witness	Danny Thomas	Episode: "Cease Upon the Midnight"
2000	Storm Damage	Danny	TV film
2000	Jason and the Argonauts	Orpheus	Mini-series
2002	The Tragedy of Hamlet	Hamlet	TV film
2002–2003	Girlfriends	Ellis Carter	9 episodes
2004–2012	Hustle	Mickey Stone	Series regular
2005	Afterlife	D.I. Felix George	Episode: "Lower Than Bones"
2005	The Ghost Squad	D.I. Gus Philips	Episode: "Colour Blind"
2006	Beyond	Morris Fitch	TV film
2007	Ballet Shoes	Mr. Sholsky	TV film
2008	Being Human	Herrick	Episode: "Pilot"
2008	Bonekickers	Ben Ergha	Mini-series
2009	Merlin	Myror	Episode: "The Once and Future Queen"
2009	Sleep With Me	Richard	TV film
2013	Robot Chicken	Bow/Lego Man (voice)	Episode: "Eaten by Cars"
2014–2015	Red Band Society	Dr. Naday	4 episodes
2015	London Spy	Professor Marcus Shaw	Mini-series
2016	Undercover	Nick Johnson	Mini-series
2017	Riviera	Robert Carver	10 episodes
2018	Trauma	Jon Allerton	Mini-series
2019	Curfew	Simon Donahue	2 episodes
2019	The Rook	Conrad Grantchester	Series regular
2020	Staged	Adrian Lester	Episode: "Ulysses"
2020	Life	David Aston	Series regular
2022	Trigger Point	Joel Nutkins	1 episode
2022	The Undeclared War	Andrew Makinde	6 episodes
2023–2024	Quentin Blake's Box of Treasures	Narrator (voice)	Animated series
2024	Renegade Nell	Earl of Poynton	8 episodes
2025	The Sandman	Destiny	5 episodes
2025	The Hack	Mr. Apollo	Episode #1.1
2026	Ponies	Dane Walter	Series regular

=== Theatre ===
Year	Title	Role	Notes
1988	Act Without Words	Man	Jerwood Vanbrugh Theatre, London
1988–1989	Love for Love		
1990	Fences	Cory Maxson	Garrick Theatre, Liverpool Playhouse
1991, 1994, 1995	As You Like It	Rosalind	Albery Theatre, Comedy Theatre
1992	Six Degrees of Separation	Paul	Royal Court Theatre, Comedy Theatre
1993	Sweeney Todd: The Demon Barber of Fleet Street	Anthony Hope	Cottesloe Theatre, Lyttelton Theatre, Theatre Royal
1994	Caste		Battersea Arts Centre
1995–1996	Company	Robert	Donmar Warehouse, Albery Theatre
2001	Hamlet	Hamlet	Young Vic
2003	Henry V	Henry V	Olivier Theatre
2013	Othello	Othello	Olivier Theatre
2016	Red Velvet	Ira Aldridge	Garrick Theatre
2019	The Shakespeare Revue	Special Guest	Mercers' Hall
2021	Hymn	Performer	Almeida Theatre
2021	The Lehman Trilogy	Emanuel Lehman & Various	Nederlander Theatre
2025	Cyrano de Bergerac	Cyrano	Swan Theatre

== Awards and honours ==
Lester was appointed Officer of the Order of the British Empire (OBE) in the 2013 New Year Honours and Commander of the Order of the British Empire (CBE) in the 2020 Birthday Honours, both for services to drama.

In July 2013, he received an honorary degree from the University of Warwick.

In December 2013, he received an honorary doctorate from the University of Birmingham.

In July 2019, Lester was made an Honorary Doctor of Arts at De Montfort University, Leicester.

Year	Award	Category	Work	Result	Ref.
1994	Laurence Olivier Awards	Best Supporting Performance in a Musical	Sweeney Todd	Nominated	
1995	Laurence Olivier Awards	Best Actor	As You Like It	Nominated	
1996	Laurence Olivier Awards	Best Actor in a Musical	Company	Won	
1999	Chicago Film Critics Association Award	Most Promising Actor	Primary Colors	Nominated	
2000	British Independent Film Award	Best Actor	Love's Labour's Lost	Nominated	
2012	Evening Standard Theatre Award	Best Actor	Red Velvet	Nominated	
2012	Critics' Circle Theatre Award	Best Actor	Red Velvet	Won	
2013	Evening Standard Theatre Award	Best Actor	Othello	Won	
2016	Laurence Olivier Award	Best Actor	Red Velvet	Nominated	
2022	Tony Award	Best Performance by a Leading Actor in a Play	The Lehman Trilogy	Nominated	
2022	Outer Critics Circle Awards	Outstanding Actor in a Play	The Lehman Trilogy	Nominated	
