= Neil Bell (actor) =

English actor (born 1970)

- Born: 4 February 1970 (age 56); Oldham, Lancashire, England
- Occupation: Actor

Neil Bell (born 4 February 1970) is an English actor, mainly on British television and occasionally in films.

Bell studied drama at Oldham College and has played character roles in such TV series as Buried, Shameless, Murphy's Law, Ideal, City Lights, The Bill and Casualty, and the films 24 Hour Party People (2002), Dead Man's Shoes (2004) and Wait For Me (2023). He also had a small role in the acclaimed TV series State of Play, playing the colleague of Polly Walker's character. He has recently had a main role in The Bill playing the role of a killer. In 2010, he had a role in the ITV comedy-drama Married Single Other. He has appeared in Coronation Street, and in 2012, he had a regular role in Downton Abbey as Durrant. In 2013, he appeared in the first series of BBC2's Peaky Blinders as Publican Harry Fenton. In February 2016, he appeared in the BBC drama series Moving On.

In 2004, he wrote, directed and starred in a biographical play about the Salford-born poet John Cooper Clarke called 36 Hours.

In 2007, he directed a play at the Contact Theatre in Manchester, entitled Fair.

In 2016, he directed the biographical play about Manchester band Joy Division called New Dawn Fades at the Dancehouse Theatre in Manchester and in 2017 he directed a play entitled Old Ground which centred around the re-opening of the Moors murders case in the mid-1980s. In 2018, he played the reformer Samuel Bamford in the film Peterloo, directed by Mike Leigh.

In 2020, Bell re-joined the cast of Coronation Street to play the role of gangster Mick Chaney.

In 2021, Bell played the role of the Sardaukar Bashar in the Denis Villeneuve film Dune. He also played the "Time Grappler" (the bell-ringer) in Andor - a prominent role with no speaking lines. Following this, Bell played the role of Max in the 2023 British independent film Wait for Me.

In 2024 he featured in the Fat Dog (band) video for their single "All the Same" and regularly performs poetry and songs at the beginning of the band's performances.

He played the custody officer in Adolescence (Netflix - 2025).
