= Ian Sansom =

British author, broadcaster and academic

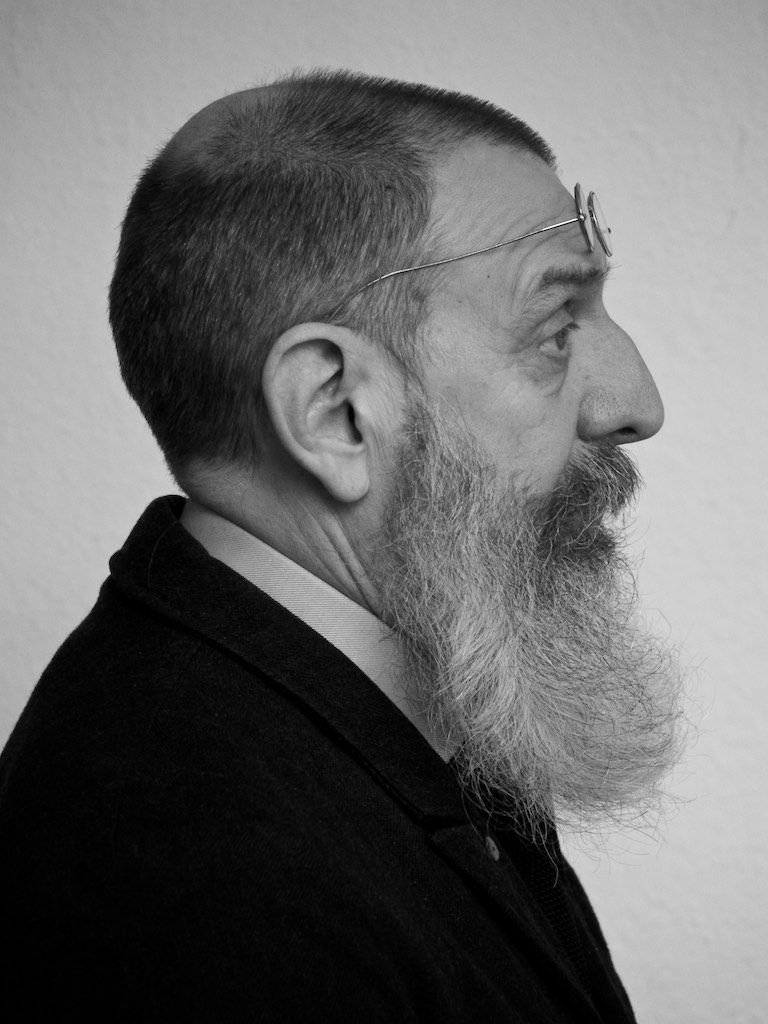
Ian Sansom profile

Ian Sansom is an English novelist, journalist, broadcaster, and academic. He is the author of The Mobile Library series of novels and the County Guides series, and has also written as a columnist and as a contributor to British and Irish newspapers and literary journals.

== Career ==
Sansom has held a number of academic posts including Professor of Creative Writing and Director of the Warwick Writing Programme at the University of Warwick; Professor and Head of the School of English at Queen's University Belfast; Director of the Oscar Wilde Centre at Trinity College Dublin; and a Research Fellow in English at Emmanuel College, Cambridge.

He has contributed as a journalist and critic to publications including The Guardian, The London Review of Books, The Times Literary Supplement, The Spectator, and the New Statesman.

Sansom was elected a Fellow of the Royal Society of Literature (FRSL) in 2025.

== Fiction ==
Sansom's fiction includes The Mobile Library series (2006–2010), beginning with The Case of the Missing Books. The series follows a librarian in Northern Ireland and combines elements of crime fiction and comedy. Reviewing The Case of the Missing Books, The Guardian noted its “quirky humour and literary playfulness”.

He later published the County Guides series, including The Norfolk Mystery (2013), Death in Devon (2015), Westmorland Alone (2016), Essex Poison (2017), and The Sussex Murders (2019).

Other fiction includes Ring Road (2004), which was broadcast on BBC Radio 4 as Book of the Week.

== Non-fiction ==
Sansom's non-fiction includes Paper: An Elegy (2012), a cultural history of paper; September 1, 1939: A Biography of a Poem (2019), a study of the W. H. Auden poem; and Reading Room: A Year of Literary Curiosities (2019). Paper: An Elegy was reviewed in The New York Times, which described it as an “engaging meditation on the material and cultural life of paper”. He has also co-authored The Enthusiast Almanack (2006) and The Enthusiast Field Guide to Poetry (2007) with David Herd.

== Journalism and essays ==
Sansom has published essays, criticism, and short fiction in journals including The Dublin Review, The London Review of Books, The Yale Review, Raritan, and Salmagundi. He has also contributed to edited collections and exhibition catalogues and has worked as an editor of literary magazines including The Enthusiast and Thumbscrew.

== Broadcasting ==
Sansom has written and presented for BBC Radio, particularly Radio 3 and Radio 4, contributing documentaries, essay series, short stories, and literary features. His work includes contributions to The Essay (BBC Radio 3), Opening Lines (BBC Radio 4) and a range of standalone features and series.

== Selected works ==
=== The Mobile Library Series ===
- The Case of the Missing Books (2006)
- Mr Dixon Disappears (2007)
- The Delegates’ Choice (2008)
- The Bad Book Affair (2010)

=== The County Guides Series ===
- The Norfolk Mystery (2013)
- Death in Devon (2015)
- Westmorland Alone (2016)
- Essex Poison (2017)
- The Sussex Murders (2019)

=== Fiction ===
- Ring Road (2004)
- December Stories I (2019)
- December Stories II (2021)

=== Non-fiction ===
- The Truth About Babies (2002)
- The Enthusiast Almanack (2006, with David Herd)
- The Enthusiast Field Guide to Poetry (2007, with David Herd)
- Paper: An Elegy (2012)
- Reading Room: A Year of Literary Curiosities (2019)
- September 1, 1939: A Biography of a Poem (2019)
