= The Last of the Haussmans =

2012 play by Stephen Beresford

- Original language: English
- Written by: Stephen Beresford
- Setting: Devon

Premiere
- Date: 19 June 2012
- Place: Lyttleton, National Theatre

The Last of the Haussmans is a play by Stephen Beresford, set in Devon, and about three generations of the Haussman family.

== Productions ==
The Last of the Haussmans opened in the Lyttleton at the National Theatre on 19 June 2012, following previews from 12 June. It had its final performance on 11 October 2012. The production was broadcast as part of National Theatre Live Helen McCrory was nominated for the Laurence Olivier Award for Best Actress in a Supporting Role for her performance as Libby.

== Cast and characters ==
| Character | London (2012) |
|---|---|
| Libby | Helen McCrory |
| Nick | Rory Kinnear |
| Summer | Isabella Laughland |
| Judy | Julie Walters |
| Peter | Matthew Marsh |
| Daniel | Taron Egerton |
