= The Ladykillers (play) =

2011 stage adaptation by Graham Linehan

The Ladykillers is a 2011 stage adaptation written by Graham Linehan based on the 1955 Ealing comedy film of the same name. The play premièred at the Liverpool Playhouse in November 2011, directed by Sean Foley. It then transferred to the Gielgud Theatre in London, opening on 7 December 2011 (after previews from 26 November 2011), and closed after a successful and extended run on 14 April 2012. The production, with a different cast, then embarked on a UK national tour from September to December 2012. The play returned to Ealing in March 2017, when it was performed at The Questors Theatre, located less than 500 metres from Ealing Studios, where the original 1955 film was shot. The play had its North American premiere at the Shaw Festival in Niagara-on-the-Lake, Ontario, Canada in June 2019 with Damien Atkins as Professor Marcus and Chick Reid as Mrs. Wilberforce.

== Key cast ==
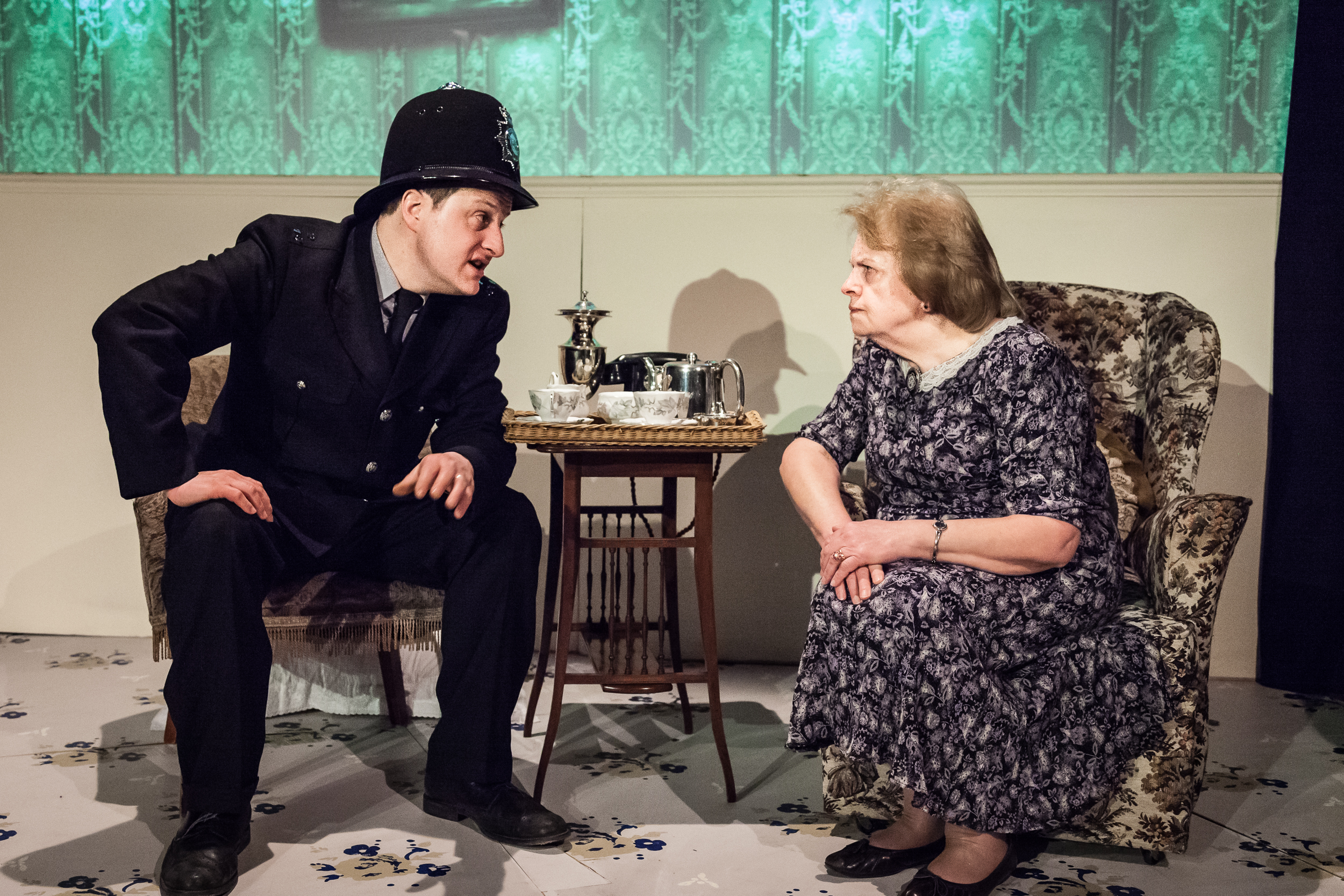
Mrs Wilberforce reports her fanciful suspicions to the local police constable, in a 2014 production by OVO theatre company, St Albans, UK

Character	Film	Original play	2012 tour	Shaw Festival 2019
Marcus	Alec Guinness	Peter Capaldi	Paul Bown	Damien Atkins
Harry	Peter Sellers	Stephen Wight	William Troughton	Andrew Lawrie
Louis	Herbert Lom	Ben Miller	Shaun Williamson	Steven Sutcliffe
Major Courtney	Cecil Parker	James Fleet	Clive Mantle	Ric Reid
One Round	Danny Green	Clive Rowe	Chris McCalphy	Martin Happer
Mrs Wilberforce	Katie Johnson	Marcia Warren	Michele Dotrice	Chick Reid
