= Henry Hitchings =

British author and critic (born 1974)

Henry Hitchings FRSL
- Born: 11 December 1974 (age 51); Guildford
- Education: Eton College; Christ Church, Oxford; University College London
- Known for: Author and critic
- Website: www.henryhitchings.com

Henry Hitchings FRSL (born 11 December 1974) is an author, reviewer and critic, specializing in narrative non-fiction, with a particular emphasis on language and cultural history. The second of his books, The Secret Life of Words: How English Became English, won the 2008 John Llewellyn Rhys Prize and a Somerset Maugham Award. He has written two books about Samuel Johnson and has served as the president of the Johnson Society of Lichfield. As a critic, he has mainly written about books and theatre. He was chair of the drama section of the UK's Critics' Circle from 2018 to 2020.

== Life ==
He was a King's Scholar at Eton College, before going to Christ Church, Oxford, and then to University College London to research his PhD on Samuel Johnson.

== Books ==
=== Dr Johnson's Dictionary ===
In 2005, Hitchings published Dr Johnson's Dictionary: The Extraordinary Story of the Book that Defined the World, a biography of Samuel Johnson's epochal A Dictionary of the English Language (1755). The first popular account of Dr Johnson's magnum opus, it "charts the struggle and ultimate triumph of one of the first attempts to 'fix' the language, which despite its imperfections proved to be one of the English language's most significant cultural monuments".

Avoiding the more usual portrayal of Dr Johnson as "a lovable eccentric", Hitchings "keeps drawing attention to the unremitting intelligence that Johnson's lexicographical labours demanded, not least in separating out the ramifying senses of common words". Whilst declaring, "Hitchings's task is to rescue Johnson from Boswell's attentions," Will Self pointed out, "The Johnson of the Dictionary was never known to Boswell, and as the older man was ill-disposed to animadvert on his younger self, Boswell got such basics as the great man's working methods on the Dictionary glaringly wrong. Not so Hitchings."

The American edition was titled Defining the World: The Extraordinary Story of Dr Johnson's Dictionary.

In the United States, Defining the World won the Modern Language Association's prize for the best work by an independent scholar in 2005.

=== The Secret Life of Words ===
In April 2008, Hitchings published The Secret Life of Words: How English Became English, a study of loanwords, calques and their cultural significance. Following the English language's history through "its debt to invasions, to threats from abroad, and to an island people's dealings with the world beyond its shores" the book examines its unbroken acquisitiveness—"but for all that [Hitchings'] true object is to reveal past frames of mind and to show how our present outlook is informed by the history squirreled away in the words we use". Instead of using history to explain language, Hitchings "picks words apart to find their origins" and then molds this "mountain of dense information into an elegant narrative". The Economist noted that "whatever is hybrid, fluid and unpoliced about English delights him".

The book was published in America under the same title the following September.

In November 2008, The Secret Life of Words won the John Llewellyn Rhys Prize, the first work of non-fiction to do so in six years. The chair of the judges, Henry Sutton, described it as a landmark, vast in scope and '"written with an unnerving precision, clarity and grace", adding "amazingly accessible, it's written with great grace and enthusiasm and humour, and is also a scholarly work." The shortlist had also included the winner of the 2008 Booker Prize, The White Tiger by Aravind Adiga.

In March 2009, on the strength of The Secret Life of Words, Hitchings was shortlisted for the Sunday Times Young Writer of the Year Award. In June 2009, he received a Somerset Maugham Award.

=== Who's Afraid of Jane Austen? ===
How to Really Talk About Books You Haven't Read, a guide to books and literary erudition, was released in October 2008. The paperback edition was given the name Who's Afraid of Jane Austen?: How to Really Talk About Books You Haven't Read.

=== The Language Wars ===
The Language Wars: A History of Proper English was published in February 2011. It is "a detailed narrative of the attempts ... to make rules about how we speak and write" and "a historical guide to the sometimes splenetic battles that have been fought over English down the centuries". Writing in The Daily Telegraph, Charles Moore, after praising the book as "crisply written, amusing, informative and thought-provoking", commented that "it is an agony not to be able to use English properly. Mr Hitchings eschews the rules: he can do that only because he knows them".

The book was published in America under the same title in October 2011.

=== Sorry! The English and their Manners ===
Hitchings's fifth book, Sorry! The English and their Manners, was published in January 2013. Writing about it in The Guardian, Ian Sansom commented that its research offered "a kind of restless, wandering, burrowing through history and ideas" and that the book "reveals ... the kind of writer Hitchings really is: an overseer, guardian, wise man, guide".

=== Browse ===
In 2016, Hitchings edited a collection of original essays about bookshops, with the title Browse: The World in Bookshops. Its contributors included Alaa Al Aswany, Stefano Benni, Michael Dirda, Daniel Kehlmann, Andrey Kurkov, Yiyun Li, Pankaj Mishra, Dorthe Nors, Yvonne Adhiambo Owuor, Ian Sansom, Elif Shafak, Iain Sinclair, Ali Smith, Sasa Stanisic and Juan Gabriel Vasquez.

=== The World in 38 Chapters, or Dr Johnson's Guide to Life ===
In June 2018, Hitchings published his sixth full-length book, returning to the subject of his first, Samuel Johnson. Jane Darcy, writing in the Times Literary Supplement, explained that "The book’s subtitle, Dr Johnson’s Guide to Life, may evoke that popular sub-genre of self-help books which co-opt historical celebrities to present tips for the modern world, but Hitchings, like his favourite author, has a serious moral purpose. Despite his often breezily demotic tone, he is deeply attuned to Johnson’s melancholy, tracing its presence throughout his adult life and its influence on his thinking about pain and suffering", and commented that "Hitchings inevitably revisits familiar places and favourite quotations. But the pleasures of this book lie in Hitchings’s fresh re-evaluation of them".

== Other writing and television ==
In May 2009, Hitchings became the theatre critic on the London Evening Standard, replacing Nicholas de Jongh. He left this role in 2019, after more than ten years, following cost-cutting at the paper.

Hitchings has written for Financial Times, the New Statesman, The Guardian, The Wall Street Journal and The Times Literary Supplement, among other publications, and has made radio, television and festival appearances.

Hitchings was the writer and presenter of the documentary Birth of the British Novel, which was first broadcast on BBC Four on Monday 7 February 2011. He had previously been a featured contributor to the documentary Samuel Johnson: The Dictionary Man in 2006.

He became a Fellow of the Royal Society of Literature in 2015. In 2018, he took up the position of president of the Johnson Society of Lichfield; he was succeeded by Rowan Williams.
