= Red Velvet (play) =

Play by Lolita Chakrabarti

Red Velvet is a 2012 play by Lolita Chakrabarti, dealing with the biography of the 19th century actor Ira Aldridge and his taking of the role of Othello as the first Black man to play this part on the British stage. The play premiered at the Tricycle Theatre, London (directed by its new artistic director Indhu Rubasingham) from 11 October to 24 November 2012, with Aldridge played by Adrian Lester. Lester revived his role when the Tricycle Theatre Production collaborated with Kenneth Branagh Company’s season at the West End's Garrick theatre in 2016. It has since been produced by several theatres in the United States and Canada.

== Plot ==
The play begins with Aldrige in later life, nearing the end of a brilliant career. A young Polish journalist, Halina Wozniak, sneaks into his dressing room to interview him about his success, and especially to find out why he has steadfastly refused to play Covent Garden Theatre since playing the lead in a production of Othello decades before. The play revisists crucial moments in Aldridge's past, especially the Othello performance, in which he stepped in for an ailing Kean, hoping to bring some authenticity to the part, but is viciously treated by critics.

== Other productions ==
- St. Ann’s Warehouse Theater, Brooklyn Bridge Park, New York City, April 2014
- Shakespeare & Company in Lenox, MA from August 6 through September 13, 2015, with Aldridge played by John Douglas Thompson.
- The Junction Theatre in Los Angeles, CA from March 26 through April 30, 2016, with Aldridge played by Paul Outlaw
- San Francisco Playhouse in San Francisco, CA from May 10 through June 25, 2016, with Aldridge played by Carl Lumbly.
- San Jose Youth Shakespeare at The Historic Hoover Theatre in San Jose, CA from August 12 through August 14, 2016, with Aldridge played by Nathan Sandoval. Directed by Bob Rumsby.
- Shakespeare Theatre of New Jersey in Madison, NJ from September 7 through September 25, 2016, with Aldridge played by Lindsay Smiling.
- Raven Theatre in Chicago, Il from September 28 through November 27, 2016, with Aldridge played by Brandon Greenhouse.
- Old Globe Theater in San Diego, Ca from March 25 through April 30, 2017, with Aldridge played by Albert Jones. Directed by Jenn Rapp.
- Lantern Theatre in Philadelphia, Pa from September 7 through October 8, 2017, with Aldridge played by Forrest McClendon
- Chicago Shakespeare Theater from December 1, 2017, through January 21, 2018, with Aldridge played by Dion Johnstone.
- Chesapeake Shakespeare Company in Baltimore, Maryland, from February 2 through February 25, 2018, with Aldridge played by Christian R. Gibbs. Directed by Shirley Basfield Dunlap.
- Ensemble Theatre Cincinnati in Cincinnati, Ohio, from March 6 through March 31, 2018, with Aldridge played by Ken Early.
- OWI (Office of War) Bureau of Theatre Boston, MA from May 30 to June 16, 2018, with Aldridge played by Seth Hill.
- Jewel Theatre in Santa Cruz, CA from January 23 through February 17, 2019, with Aldridge played by Aldo Billingslea. Directed by Bob Rumsby.
- Southern Connecticut State University in New Haven, CT from February 28 through March 7, 2020, with Aldridge played by Gary Robinson Jr. and Malcolm Davis
- Shakespeare Theatre Company in Washington, DC from June 16th through July 17th, 2022, with Aldridge played by Amari Cheatom. Directed by Jade King Carroll.
- Crow's Theatre, Toronto, from November 22nd through December 18th, 2022, with Allan Lewis playing Aldridge.
- Burbage Theatre Company in Pawtucket, RI from June 1st through June 18th, 2023, with Aldridge played by Ja'Quan Malik Jones. Directed by Jackie Davis.
- Bag&Baggage Productions in Hillsboro, OR from July 21st through August 6th, 2023, with Aldridge played by Eric Zulu. Directed by Nik Whitcomb.
- Crescent Theatre Company in Birmingham UK, July 2024, with Hugh Blackwood as the older and Papa Yentumi as the younger Ira Aldridge. Director: Alan K. Marshall
