= List of works by Alan Bennett =

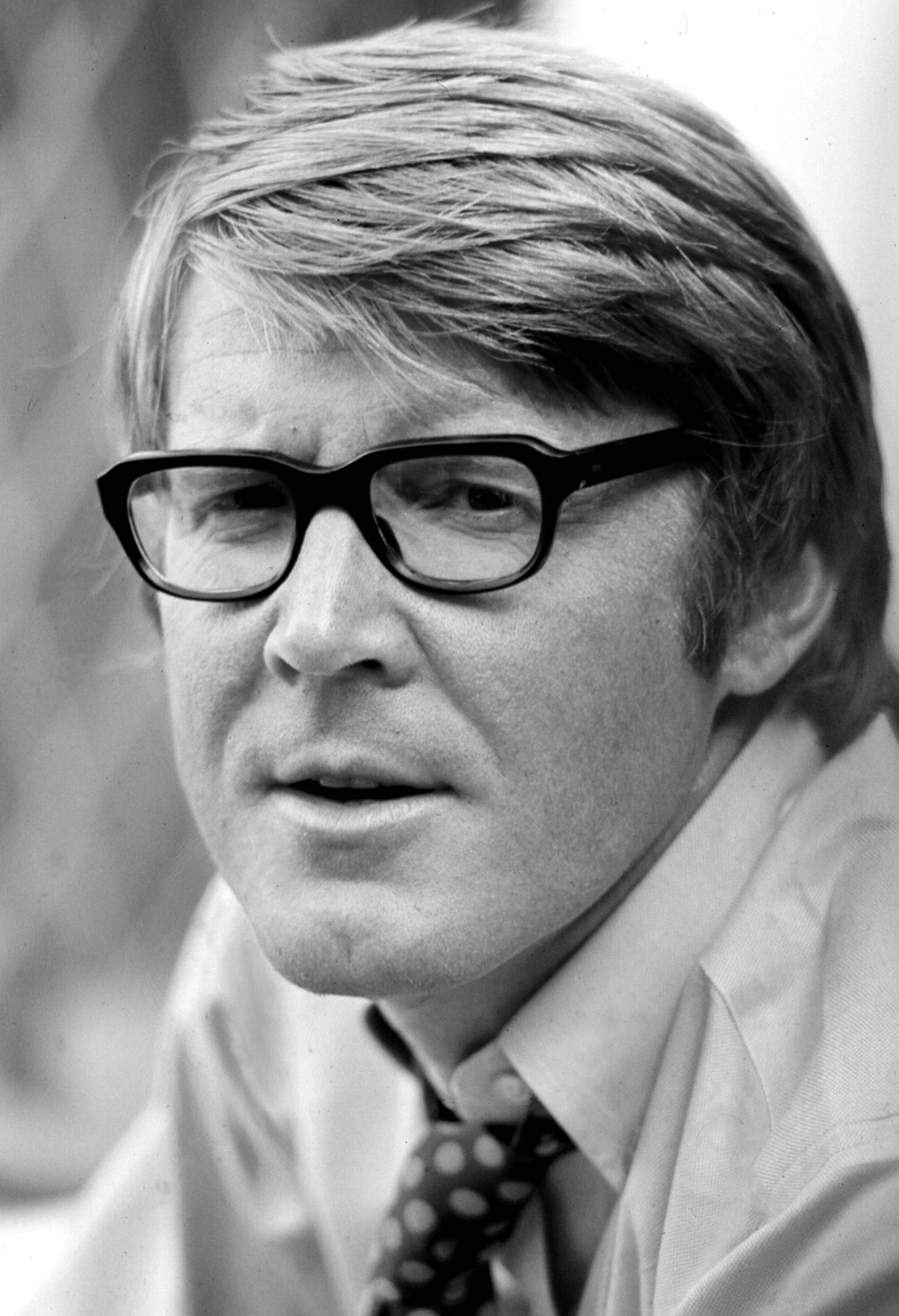
Alan Bennett in London, 1973

Alan Bennett is an English playwright.

Having started at the Royal National Theatre, he became known for such works as Talking Heads, The Madness of King George, The History Boys, The Lady in the Van and The Habit of Art. The following plays were later adapted into films, The Madness of King George (1995), The History Boys (2005), and The Lady in the Van (2015).

== Television ==
- A Trip to the Moon (actor), 1964
- The Saint (actor; 3 episodes), 1964–65
- Sunday Night (actor; 1 episode), 1965
- My Father Knew Lloyd George (actor and co-writer), 1965
- Famous Gossips (actor; 1 episode), 1965
- Plato—The Drinking Party, 1965
- Alice in Wonderland (actor), 1966
- On the Margin (actor & writer), 1966–67
- Not Only... But Also (actor; 1 episode), 1970
- Hamlet (actor), 1971
- A Day Out (writer and bit role), 1972
- Sunset Across the Bay (writer), 1975
- A Little Outing (actor and writer), 1975
- A Visit from Miss Prothero (writer and narrator), 1978
- Me! I'm Afraid of Virginia Woolf (narrator and writer), 1978
- Doris and Doreen (Green Forms) (writer), 1978
- The Old Crowd (writer) with Lindsay Anderson (director), LWT 1979
- Afternoon Off (actor & writer), 1979
- One Fine Day (writer), 1979
- All Day on the Sands (writer), 1979
- Objects of Affection (writer), 1982
- The Merry Wives of Windsor (actor), 1982
- Intensive Care (actor and writer), 1982
- An Englishman Abroad (writer), 1983
- The Insurance Man (writer), 1986
- Breaking Up (actor), 1986
- Man and Music (narrator), 1986
- Talking Heads (actor (one episode) and writer), 1988
- The Wind in the Willows, The Willows in Winter (voice), 1995–1996
- The World of Peter Rabbit and Friends (voice), 1995
- The Story Store (voices and narrator), 1995
- Down Cemetery Road: The Landscape of Philip Larkin (presenter), 1987
- Fortunes of War series (actor), 1987
- Dinner at Noon (narrator), 1988
- Poetry in Motion (presenter), 1990
- 102 Boulevard Haussmann (writer), 1990
- A Question of Attribution (writer), 1991
- Selling Hitler (actor), 1991
- Ashenden (actor), 1991
- Julie Walters and Friends (actor and co-writer), 1991
- Poetry in Motion 2 (presenter), 1992
- A Night In (presenter), 1992
- The Long Summer (narrator), 1993
- Portrait or Bust (presenter), 1994
- The Abbey (presenter), 1995
- A Dance to the Music of Time (actor), 1997
- Talking Heads 2, 1998
- Did I Say Hairdressing? I Meant Astrophysics (narrator),1998
- Telling Tales (writer and presenter), 2000
- Christmas Under Fire (documentary, as narrator), 2002
- The Young Visiters (narrator), 2003
- Meg and Mog (voice), 2003–04
- The South Bank Show (documentary, as himself), 2005
- Being Alan Bennett (BBC documentary), 2009
- Mark Lawson Talks To Alan Bennett (BBC, extended interview), 2009
- Bennett on Bennett (5 10-minute monologues, as himself), 2009
- Storyville Survivors: My Friend Sam - Living For the Moment (documentary, as himself), 2012
- Family Guy (Brian's Play, as himself), 2013
- The Native Hue of Resolution (documentary, as himself; also contributing writer), 2013
- Mouse and Mole (voice), 2013
- Alan Bennett at 80: Bennett Meets Hytner (documentary, as himself), 2014
- Stop All the Clocks: WH Auden in an Age of Anxiety (documentary, as himself)
- Talking Heads (Remake), 2020

== Theatre ==
- Better Late, 1959
- Beyond the Fringe (also co-writer), 1960
- The Blood of the Bambergs, 1962
- A Cuckoo in the Nest, 1964
- Forty Years On (also writer), 1968
- Sing a Rude Song (co-writer), 1969
- Getting On (writer), 1971
- Habeas Corpus (also writer), 1973
- The Old Country (writer), 1977
- Enjoy (writer), 1980
- Kafka's Dick (writer), 1986
- A Visit from Miss Prothero (writer), 1987
- Single Spies (An Englishman Abroad and A Question of Attribution) (also writer and director), 1989
- The Wind in the Willows (adaptation), 1990
- The Madness of George III (writer), 1991
- Talking Heads (Waiting for the telegram, A Chip in the Sugar, Bed Among the Lentils, A Lady of Letters, Her Big Chance, Soldiering On, A Cream Cracker Under the Settee) (also writer), 1992
- The Lady in the Van (writer), 1999
- The History Boys (writer), 2004
- The Habit of Art (writer), 2009
- People (writer), 2012
- Hymn (writer), 2012
- Cocktail Sticks (writer), 2012
- Allelujah! (writer), 2018

== Film ==
- Every Home Should Have One (actor; uncredited), 1970
- Long Shot, 1980
- Dreamchild (voice of the Mock Turtle), 1985
- The Secret Policeman's Ball, 1986
- The Secret Policeman's Other Ball, 1982
- A Private Function (screenplay, with Malcolm Mowbray), 1984
- Pleasure at Her Majesty's, 1976
- Prick Up Your Ears (screenplay), 1987
- Little Dorrit, 1987
- The Wind in the Willows (voice of Mole), 1995
- Parson's Pleasure (writer), 1995
- The Madness of King George (screenplay from his play The Madness of George III and cameo appearance), 1995
- The Willows in Winter (voice of Mole), 1996
- In Love and War (actor)
- The Importance of Being Morrissey (cinematic documentary, as himself), 2002
- The History Boys (screenplay, from his play of the same name), 2006
- National Theatre: Fifty Years on Stage (actor and writer), 2013
- The Lady in the Van (screenplay, from his play of the same name; cameo), 2015
- Alan Bennett's Diaries (cinematic documentary, as himself; also writer), 2016
- Allelujah (screenplay, from his play of the same name), 2022
- The Choral (screenplay), 2025

== Radio ==
- The Great Jowett, 1980
- Dragon, 1982
- Uncle Clarence (writer, narrator), 1985
- Winnie-the-Pooh (reader), 1983, 1984
- Alice's Adventures in Wonderland (reader), 1985
- Better Halves (narrator), 1988
- Forty Years On (writer), 2000
- The Lady in the Van (writer, narrator), 2009
- Denmark Hill, 2014 (from unproduced 1982 screenplay)

== Books ==
- Beyond the Fringe (with Peter Cook, Jonathan Miller, and Dudley Moore). London: Souvenir Press, 1962, and New York: Random House, 1963
- Forty Years On, London: Faber, 1969
- Getting On, London: Faber, 1972
- Habeas Corpus, London: Faber, 1973
- The Old Country, London: Faber, 1978
- Enjoy, London: Faber, 1980
- Office Suite, London: Faber, 1981
- Objects of Affection, London: BBC Publications, 1982
- A Private Function, London: Faber, 1984
- Forty Years On; Getting On; Habeas Corpus, London: Faber, 1985
- The Writer in Disguise, London: Faber, 1985
- Prick Up Your Ears: The Film Screenplay, London: Faber, 1987
- Two Kafka Plays, London: Faber, 1987
- Talking Heads, London: BBC Publications, 1988; New York: Summit, 1990
- Single Spies, London: Faber, 1989
- The Lady in the Van (essay in the London Review of Books), 1989
- The Lady in the Van (book), 1990
- Single Spies and Talking Heads, New York: Summit, 1990
- Poetry in Motion, (with others). 1990
- The Wind in the Willows, London: Faber, 1991
- Forty Years on and Other Plays, London: Faber, 1991
- The Madness of George III, London: Faber, 1992
- Poetry in Motion 2 (with others) 1992
- Writing Home (memoir & essays) London: Faber, 1994
- The Madness of King George (screenplay), 1995
- Father! Father! Burning Bright (prose version of 1982 TV script, Intensive Care), 1999
- The Laying on of Hands (stories), 2000
- The Clothes They Stood Up In (novella), 2001
- Untold Stories (memoir & essays), London, 2005, ISBN 0-571-22830-5
- The Uncommon Reader (novella), London, 2007
- A Life Like Other People's (memoir), London, 2009
- Smut: Two Unseemly Stories (stories), London, 2011
- Six Poets: Hardy to Larkin: An Anthology, London: Faber, 2015
- Keeping on Keeping On (memoir & essays), London, 2016
- The Shielding of Mrs Forbes, London: Faber, 2019 (part of Faber Stories series)
- House Arrest: Pandemic Diaries, London: Faber, 2022
- "Killing Time" (novella), London, Faber, 2024.
- Enough Said (diaries), London: Faber, 2026

=== Audio releases ===
- Alan Bennett at the BBC (compilation)
- Diaries 1980–1990
- Diaries 1997–2004
- Telling Tales
- Hymn
- The Lady in the Van
- Alan and Thora
- Untold Stories
- Smut: Two Unseemly Stories: The Greening of Mrs Donaldson & The Shielding of Mrs Forbes
- Written on the Body
- A Common Assault
- Beyond the Fringe
- Alan Bennett's on the Margin
- Forty Years On (1973 version)
- Forty Years On (2003 version)
- Kafka's Dick
- An Englishman Abroad (1983 version)
- An Englishman Abroad (2006 version)
- A Question of Attribution
- The Madness of King George III
- The History Boys
- The Lady in the Van (play)
- A Woman of No Importance
- The Clothes They Stood Up In
- The Laying on of Hands
- Father! Father! Burning Bright
- Say Something Happened
- A Visit From Miss Protheroe
- Two in Torquay
- The Uncommon Reader
- Dear Philip, Dear Kingsley (with Robert Hardy)
- Poetry in Motion
- Winnie the Pooh (narrator)
- The House at Pooh Corner (narrator)
- A Party for Pooh (narrator)
- The Wind in the Willows (narrator)
- Peter Pan and Wendy (narrator)
- The Story of Doctor Dolittle (narrator)
- The Voyages of Doctor Dolittle (narrator)
- Doctor Dolittle's Garden (narrator)
- The Owl and the Pussycat (narrator)
- The Little Prince (narrator)
- Animal Farm (narrator)
- Alice in Wonderland and Through The Looking-Glass (narrator)
