= List of awards and nominations received by Alan Bennett =

Alan Bennett awards and nominations
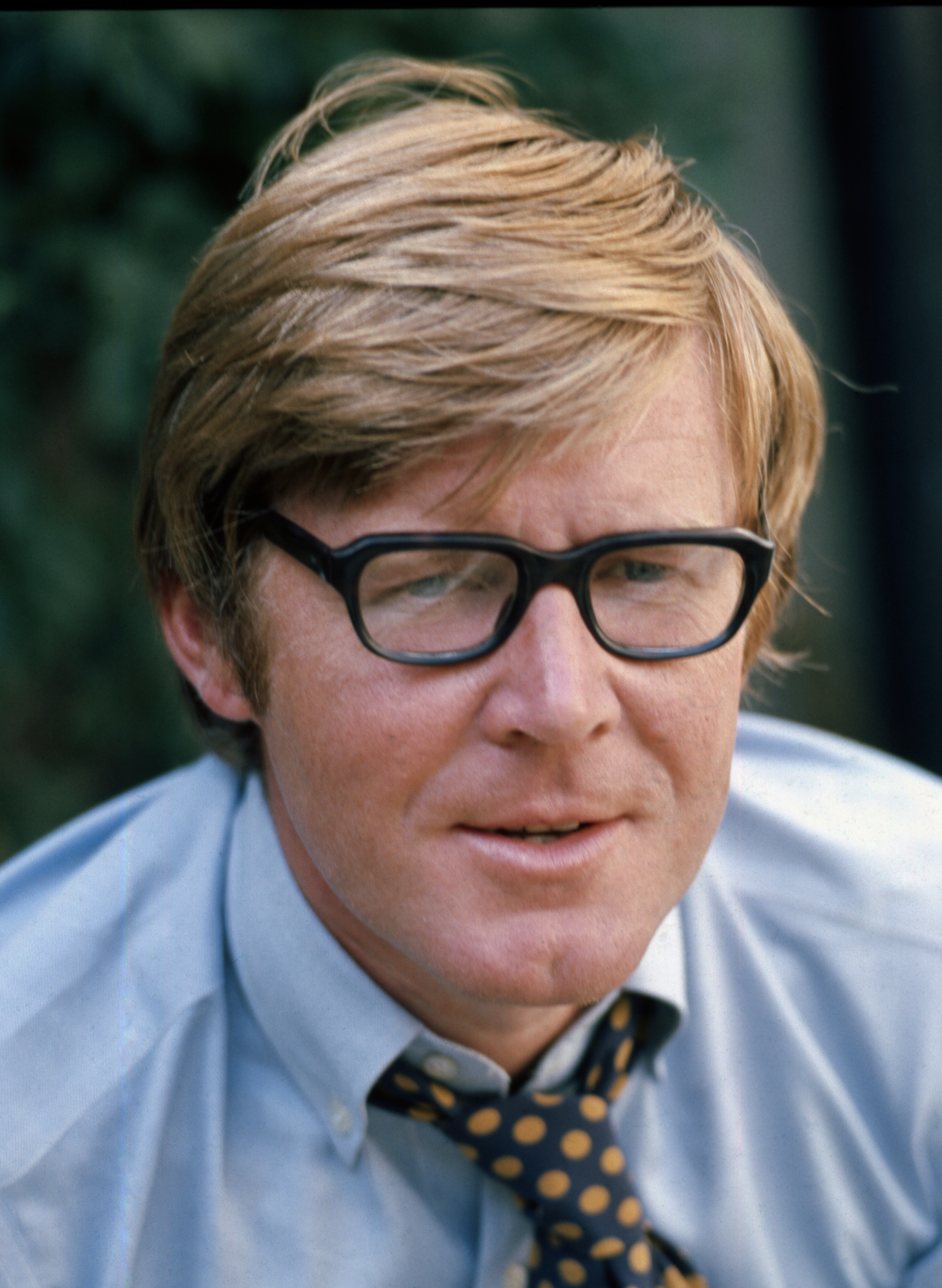
Award	Wins	Nominations
Academy Awards	0	1
BAFTA Awards	4	14
Tony Awards	2	2
Olivier Awards	5	7

Alan Bennett is an English playwright known for his work film, theatre and television.

He has received various awards for his work in film, television and theatre. For film he earned an Academy Award for Best Adapted Screenplay nomination for The Madness of King George (1994). He also received four British Academy Film Award nominations for A Private Function (1984), Prick Up Your Ears (1987), and The Madness of King George (1994), winning Outstanding British Film for the latter. For his work on television he has received eight British Academy Television Awards nominations for Talking Heads (1989), Screen Two (1992), and Talking Heads 2 winning for the latter, in addition to two Best Entertainment Performance wins in the 1960s.

For his work in theatre he has received four competitive Laurence Olivier Awards for his work on the West End. He won for Single Spies in 1990, Talking Heads in 1992, and The History Boys in 2005. That same year he received the Society of London Theatre Special Award. He has also received two Tony Awards for his work on the Broadway stage. He won a Special Tony Award in 1963 for Beyond The Fringe alongside Peter Cook, Jonathan Miller, and Dudley Moore. He also won Best Play for The History Boys in 2005. He also won a Drama Desk Award, five Evening Standard Theatre Awards, three New York Drama Critics Circle Awards, two London Film Critics Circle Awards, and an Outer Critics Circle Award.

== Major associations ==
=== Academy Awards ===
Year	Category	Nominated work	Result	Ref.
1994	Best Adapted Screenplay	The Madness of King George	Nominated	

=== BAFTA Awards ===
Year	Category	Nominated work	Result	Ref.
British Academy Film Awards
1984	Best Original Screenplay	A Private Function	Nominated	
1987	Best Adapted Screenplay	Prick Up Your Ears	Nominated	
1995	Best Adapted Screenplay	The Madness of King George	Nominated	
1995	Alexander Korda Award for Best British Film	The Madness of King George	Won	
British Academy Television Awards
1967	Best Light Entertainment Performance	—N/a	Won	
1968	Best Light Entertainment Performance	—N/a	Won	
1989	Best Actor	Talking Heads: A Chip in the Sugar	Nominated	
1989	Best Drama Series	Talking Heads: A Cream Cracker under the Settee	Nominated	
1989	Best Single Drama	Talking Heads: A Bed Among the Lentils	Nominated	
1989	Best Single Drama	Talking Heads: A Lady of Letters	Nominated	
1992	Best Single Drama	Screen Two: A Question of Attribution	Won	
1992	Best Single Drama	Screen Two: 102 Boulevard Haussmann	Nominated	
1999	Best Single Drama	Talking Heads 2: Waiting for the Telegram	Nominated	
1999	Best Single Drama	Talking Heads 2: Playing Sandwiches	Nominated	

=== Laurence Olivier Awards ===
Year	Category	Nominated work	Result	Ref.
1990	Best New Comedy	Single Spies	Won	
1992	Best Entertainment	Talking Heads	Won	
1992	Best Actor in a Musical	Talking Heads	Won	
1992	Best New Play	The Madness of George III	Nominated	
2000	Best New Play	The Lady in the Van	Nominated	
2005	Best New Play	The History Boys	Won	
2005	Society of London Theatre Special Award	—N/a	Honored	

=== Tony Awards ===
Year	Category	Nominated work	Result	Ref.
1963	Special Tony Award	Beyond the Fringe (shared with Peter Cook, Jonathan Miller and Dudley Moore)	Honored	
2006	Best Play	The History Boys	Won	

== Theatre awards ==
=== Critics' Circle Theatre Award ===
- 2004 Critics' Circle Theatre Award, Best New Play: The History Boys (won)
- 2005 Critics' Circle Award for Distinguished Service to the Arts (won)

=== Drama Desk Award ===
- 2003 Drama Desk Award, Outstanding Play: Talking Heads - nominated
- 2006 Drama Desk Award, Outstanding Play: The History Boys - won

=== Evening Standard Award ===
- 1968 Evening Standard Award, Special Award: Forty Years On - won
- 1985 Evening Standard British Film Award, Best Screenplay: A Private Function (shared with Malcolm Mowbray) - won
- 1987 Evening Standard British Film Award, Best Screenplay: Prick Up Your Ears - won
- 1995 Evening Standard British Film Award, Best Screenplay: The Madness of King George - won
- 2004 Evening Standard Award, Best Play: The History Boys - won

=== New York Drama Critics Circle ===
- 1963 New York Drama Critics' Circle Award, Special Award: Beyond the Fringe (shared with Peter Cook, Jonathan Miller and Dudley Moore) - won
- 2003 New York Drama Critics' Circle Award, Best Foreign Play: Talking Heads - won
- 2006 New York Drama Critics' Circle Award, Best Play: The History Boys - won

=== Outer Critics Circle Award ===
- 2003 Outer Critics Circle Award, Outstanding Off-Broadway Play: Talking Heads - nominated
- 2006 Outer Critics Circle Award, Outstanding Broadway Play: The History Boys - won

== Miscellaneous awards ==
=== Bodley Medla ===
- 2008 Bodley Medal

=== Bollinger Prize ===
- 2008 Bollinger Everyman Wodehouse Prize: The Uncommon Reader - nominated

=== British Book Award ===
- 1995 British Book Award, Book of the Year: Writing Home - won
- 2002 British Book Award, Audiobook of the Year: The Laying on of Hands - won
- 2003 British Book Award, Lifetime Achievement Award
- 2006 British Book Award, Author of the Year - won

=== British Comedy Award ===
- 2000 British Comedy Award, Lifetime Achievement Award

=== GLAAD Award ===
- 2007 GLAAD Media Award, Outstanding Film - Limited Release: The History Boys - nominated

=== Hawthornden Prize ===
- 1989 Hawthornden Prize: Talking Heads

=== JR Ackerley Prize ===
- 2006 J. R. Ackerley Prize for Autobiography: Untold Stories - won

=== London Film Critics Circle ===
- 1987 Critics' Circle Film Award, Screenwriter of the Year: Prick Up Your Ears - won
- 1995 Critics' Circle Film Award, Screenwriter of the Year: The Madness of King George - won

=== Samuel Johnson Prize ===
- 2006 Samuel Johnson Prize: Untold Stories - nominated
