= Afternoon Off =

1979 film by Stephen Frears

- Written by: Alan Bennett
- Directed by: Stephen Frears
- Starring: Henry Man; Benjamin Whitrow; Angela Morant; Pasquale Perrino
- Music by: George Fenton
- Country of origin: United Kingdom
- Original language: English

Production
- Producers: Stephen Frears; Tony Wharmby
- Cinematography: Charles Stewart
- Editor: Andrew Page

Original release
- Network: ITV
- Release: 3 February 1979

Afternoon Off is a 1979 television play by Alan Bennett. Broadcast under the umbrella title Six Plays by Alan Bennett, it was produced for London Weekend Television and directed by Stephen Frears. The screenplay was published by Faber and Faber in 1984.

== Synopsis ==
Lee, a Chinese waiter in a large hotel in Hartlepool, England, has various adventures in trying to locate the elusive Iris, whom he has been led to believe will have sex with him. His inability to speak fluent English and the varying degrees of assistance or confusion several individuals offer lead him on a wild goose chase. He finally encounters Iris in bed with one of his waiting staff colleagues at the very hotel at which he started off.

== Cast ==
It stars Henry Man as Lee, with an all star cast almost all of whom are in cameo roles, including one by Alan Bennett himself.

- Henry Man as Lee
- Sherrie Hewson as Iris
- Benjamin Whitrow as Father
- Angela Morant as Mother
- Pasquale Perrino as Maitre d'
- Philip Jackson as Bernard
- Harold Innocent as Marjory
- Pete Postlethwaite as Art Gallery attendant
- Stan Richards as Man in Art Gallery
- Harry Markham as Harry
- Jackie Shinn as Jackie
- Elizabeth Spriggs as Miss Beckinsale
- Peter Butterworth as Mr Bywaters
- Joan Scott as Shoe-Shop manageress
- Angela Curran as Shirley
- Carol MacReady as Shoe-Shop customer
- Patricia Baker as Iris Butterfield
- Douglas Quarterman as Ernest Fletcher
- Alan Bennett as Mr Petty
- Janine Duvitski as Doreen
- Richard Griffiths as Factory Boss
- John Normington as Duggie
- Paul Shane as Alf
- Neville Smith as Cyril
- Bernard Wrigley as Vic
- Anna Massey as Coffee-Shop owner
- Stephanie Cole as Customer
- Sylvia Brayshay as Hospital Orderly
- Vicky Ireland as Second Orderly
- Thora Hird as Mrs Beevers
- Lucita Lijertwood as Nurse
