= Bibs Ekkel =

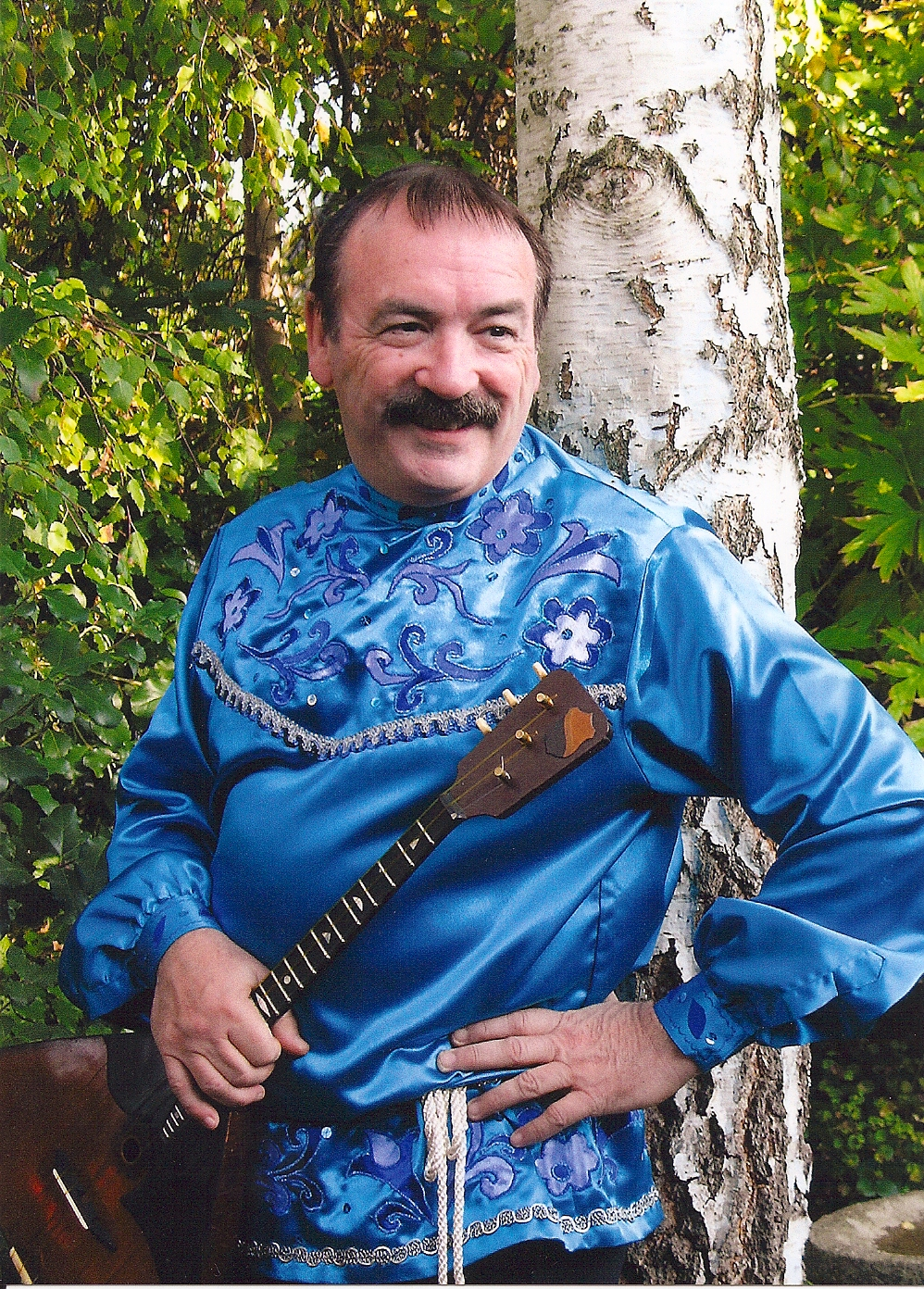
- Bibs with Balalaika and Garmoshka.

Background information
- Birth name: Vyvyan John Ekkel
- Born: 11 January 1946 (age 79)
- Origin: Brighton, UK
- Genres: Russian folk music, Russian Gypsy,
- Occupation(s): Balalaika player, composer, singer, songwriter, bandleader, author
- Instrument(s): Balalaika, Garmoshka, Guitar, Seven-string guitar, Piano
- Years active: 1960s – present
- Website: www.bibsekkel.com

Bibs Ekkel (born 11 January 1946) is one of few exponents of the balalaika outside Russia.

Ekkel is of a mixed Polish-English background. His career as a professional balalaika player has included concerts, cabaret, recordings, films, and radio and television appearances in Europe and North America. In Russia he has performed on radio and TV as well as at Moscow's "Hall of Columns" and "Tchaikovsky Hall".

He has lectured on Russian folk music at American universities, co-authored a BBC Radio educational series on the subject, and worked as Russian music adviser for several BBC TV productions. He has also had Russian or Polish speaking roles in a variety of movies.

In addition to his activities as a soloist, Ekkel runs a Russian music and dance ensemble, "Tziganka", which has toured internationally since 1975, an instrumental quartet "Balalaika Potpourri" (started by him in Vancouver in 1989, soon after his move there from London) and the duo "Russian Tornado", specifically aimed at school concerts. Some of his many recordings have been issued by "Russkiy Disk" Moscow, CBS Israel, and Decca Records in London.

In 1983, Ekkel had a small role in Alan Bennett's television film An Englishman Abroad.

In 2006, he was one of the soloists accompanying the BBC Symphony Orchestra on the Last Night of the Proms.
