= Bird of Prey (serial) =

- Freeze-frame from the computer block-graphic style animated title sequence
- Genre: Drama
- Created by: Ron Hutchinson
- Starring: Richard Griffiths; Carole Nimmons
- Country of origin: United Kingdom
- Original language: English
- No. of series: 2
- No. of episodes: 8

Production
- Producer: Michael Wearing
- Running time: 50
- Production company: BBC

Original release
- Network: BBC1
- Release: 22 April 1982 – 27 September 1984

Bird of Prey is a British techno-thriller television serial written by Ron Hutchinson and produced by Michael Wearing and Bernard Krichefski for the BBC in 1982. It was directed by Michael Rolfe. The second series was co-written with Lee Montague.

The series starred Richard Griffiths and Carole Nimmons as Henry and Anne Jay: Henry is a humble but highly computer-savvy civil servant who finds that he and his wife are drawn into an international conspiracy involving the mysterious Le Pouvoir organisation. A sequel, Bird of Prey 2 followed in 1984.

== Plot outline ==
=== Series 1 ===
Henry Jay, a lacklustre and predictable government clerk compiling statistics and writing reports on computer fraud, suddenly finds himself with the threads of an international computer fraud in his hands. Forced to flee his wife and home when bodies start littering his path, he unexpectedly evades pursuit long enough to realise that his one chance at survival is to complete the puzzle and turn the tables on his pursuers – thus turning this very unlikely candidate into a "bird of prey".

=== Series 2 ===
Again under attack, Henry Jay must escape the clutches of a professional assassin who is interested in having a piece of the action and the country they are in, find a way to eliminate the dangers, and permanently safeguard his wife and himself.

== Cast ==
=== Series 1 ===
- Richard Griffiths as Henry Jay
- Carole Nimmons as Anne Jay
- Nigel Davenport as Charles Bridgnorth
- Christopher Logue as Hugo Jardine
- Jeremy Child as Tony Hendersly
- Roger Sloman as Harry Tomkins
- Trevor Martin as Chambers
- Pamela Moiseiwitsch as Miss Lucas
- Richard Ireson as Detective Sergeant Vine
- Jim Broadbent as Detective Inspector Richardson
- Michael O'Hagan as Detective Constable Slater
- Billy Hamon as Detective Constable Morrisey
- Stephen Thorne as Bank Manager
- Edmund Pegge as Lanchbury
- Sally Faulkner as Hannah Brent
- Mandy Rice-Davies as Julia
- Nicolas Chagrin as Louis Vacheron
- Rudi Delhem as Hotel Porter
- Wolfe Morris as Mr. Martin
- Henry Stamper as Dalgleish
- Guido Adorni as Mario
- Eddie Mineo as Dino

=== Series 2 ===
- Richard Griffiths as Henry Jay
- Carole Nimmons as Anne Jay
- Michael Cashman as Reeves
- Roland Curram as Mr. Adrian
- Jan Holden as Mrs. Lucas
- Hugh Fraser as Kelner
- Lee Montague as Roche
- Valerie Minifie as Irene Benson
- Jack Chissick as Fred Benson
- Richard Miles as Art Gallery Assistant
- Elaine Ford as Thelma Dent
- Terence Rigby as Duggan
- Heather Tobias as Halston
- Bob Peck as Greggory
- Joan Blackham as Kaye Greggory
- Timothy Bateson as Mr. Jorry
- Bara Chambers as Jenks
- Patrick Jordan as Mr Miles
- Stephen Churchett as Mr. Conry
- Marian Kemmer as Matron
- Stephane Vasseur as Spook
- Enrique Massari as Trapdoor

== Filming locations ==
Bird of Prey (first season) makes heavy use of outdoor locations around the derelict Port of London and the City of London, while Bird of Prey 2 includes the newly built Blackfriars in London and Silbury Boulevard in Milton Keynes. The outside of Richard Griffith's house, supposedly in Pinner, was filmed in Selly Park, Birmingham.

== DVD release ==
Bird of Prey and Bird of Prey 2 were released together on DVD x 2, BBC 2 Entertain, CCTV30316 (Region 2 + 4 colour PAL, UK) in 2006.
