= Giles Cooper (actor) =

British actor (born 1982)

- Born: 11 August 1982 (age 44); Bath, Somerset, England
- Education: Central School of Speech and Drama
- Occupation: Actor
- Years active: 2003–present

Giles Cooper (born 11 August 1982) is a British actor. He is best known for playing Fred Silvester in the 2018 UK Tour of This House and food writer Nigel Slater in the 2019 London premiere of Toast.

== Early life ==
Giles Cooper was born in Bath, UK and attended Kingswood School. He is the grandson of BBC radio dramatist Giles Cooper.

== Career ==
Giles Cooper trained at the Royal Central School of Speech and Drama. He has appeared in numerous stage plays including After the Dance at the Royal National Theatre in 2010, People and Henry V in 2012, The Duchess of Malfi and Knight of the Burning Pestle at Shakespeare's Globe in 2014. He performed in the 2015 London revival of As Is. In 2018, he performed the role of Fred Silvester in the first national UK tour of This House. In 2019, it was announced that he would play food writer Nigel Slater in the stage adaption of Toast. In 2020, he reprised the role of Nigel for an audio version of Toast recorded during lockdown. The production raised money for the Lawrence Batley Theatre in Huddersfield.

Cooper's film credits include The Lady in the Van, directed by Nicholas Hytner, and Pride, directed by Matthew Warchus.

== Filmography ==
=== Film and television ===
Year	Film	Role	Notes
2005	The Nun	Harley	
2007	Consenting Adults	Philip French	TV movie
2011	Killing Adam	James	Short
2012	Hollyoaks	Business Man	TV series – 1 Episode
2013	Pride	Steward	
2014	The Duchess of Malfi	Silvio	BBC Broadcast
2015	The Lady in the Van	Passer-by	
2017	Oska Bayte	Writer	Short Film
2017	The Forbidden Door	Writer	Short Film
2017	Airport Hotel	Young Man	Music Video

=== Stage ===
Year	Production	Role	Theatre
2003	Rafts and Dreams	Alex	Manchester Royal Exchange Theatre
2004	Across Oka	Nikolai	Manchester Royal Theatre Exchange
2004	Twelfth Night	Sebastian	Bolton Octagon
2004	The Witches	Boy	Birmingham Rep
2005	The Witches	Boy	Wyndham's Theatre
2006	Rafts and Dreams	Alex	Royal Court Theatre
2006	A Touch of the Sun	John	Salisbury Playhouse
2008	Think Global, F**k Local	Pip	Royal Court Theatre
2009	Dreams of Violence	Carl/Simon	Soho Theatre
2010	Little Billee	Trilby	Finborough Theatre
2010	The Talented Mr Ripley	Pip	Royal & Derngate Northampton
2011	After the Dance	Dr George Banner	Royal National Theatre
2011	Great Expectations	Herbert Pocket	English Touring Theatre
2012	People	Nigel	Royal National Theatre
2012	Henry V	Montjoy/Monsier le Fer/Sir Thomas Grey	Shakespeare's Globe
2014	The Knight of the Burning Pestle	Michael	Shakespeare's Globe
2014	The Duchess of Malfi	Silvio	Shakespeare's Globe
2015	As Is	Chet	Trafalgar Studios
2017	A Princess Undone	Tristan	National Tour
2018	This House	Fred Silvester	National Tour
2019	Toast	Nigel Slater	London's West End
2019	Toast	Nigel Slater	National Tour
