= The Old Country (play) =

- Alec Guinness and Rachel Kempson in The Old Country
- Original language: English
- Written by: Alan Bennett
- Genre: Drama

Premiere
- Date: 1977
- Place: Queen's Theatre

The Old Country is Alan Bennett’s fourth play. It is about a fictional English one-time spy (echo of the real spy Kim Philby) living with his wife in exile in Russia. They are visited by two English couples, with whom they discuss how England has changed, his life in Russia, the nature of friendship, the relative importance of art. It turns out one of the visitors has come to try to persuade him to return to England, and succeeds.

The play opened in London in 1977 starring Alec Guinness and ran for twelve months.

The spy, Hilary, lives with his wife Bron in an English manner “bordering on the grotesque”. Eric, another former spy, much younger than Hilary, comes to call, with his Russian wife Olga. They get into a discussion about Englishness.

Olga opines, “They are the most embarrassed nation in the world, the English. You cannot look each other in the face.... Husbands embarrassed by wives, Wives embarrassed by husbands. Children by parents. Is there anyone not embarrassed in England? The Queen, perhaps?”

Eric and Olga leave to go on a picnic. Hilary’s sister Veronica arrives from England with her husband Duff who was recently knighted for public service. Together they talk about the state of England, the disappearance of a popular chain of coffee houses, the mass culling of diseased elm trees, the Church of England’s replacement of the Book of Common Prayer, E.M. Forster’s views on friendship and treason.

The talk is riddled throughout with irony. Hilary expostulates: “In England we never entirely mean what we say, do we? Do I mean that? Not entirely. And logically it follows that when we say we don’t mean what we say, only then are we entirely serious.”

Duff suggests to Hilary that it might be easy to find a publisher for his memoirs. “Memoirs make a mint.”

Hilary wonders whether Duff is serious. “Irony is inescapable. We are conceived in irony. We float in it from the womb. It’s the amniotic fluid. It’s the silver sea. It’s the waters at their priestlike task washing away guilt and purpose and responsibility. Joking but not joking. Caring but not caring. Serious but not serious.”

Duff discloses that he and some friends were discussing the possibility of Hilary returning to England. A minimal spell in prison, then life in the country. Financially no more problems. Appearances on television and in the Sunday newspapers. People falling over themselves.

The women intercede that there must be an explanation. Veronica: “Well what about this mess on the carpet, which we’ve had to live with for fifteen years. When you’ve lowered your pinstripes and done your No. 2s right in the middle of the hearth-rug one is entitled to some explanation. It would be nice to think this turd had an infrastructure.”

Bron: “People died. And not merely died. Eventually died. Good people. Friends.”

Hilary gives us the only glimpse in the play of why he did it. “Done out of devilment, would that meet with sympathy? To be on one’s own? Alone? If for no other reason than to be one’s own worst enemy.”

He asks, “How can I come home? I am home. I am a Soviet citizen.”

Duff: “A technicality. To do with ordinary people.”

It transpires that a prisoner swap has been arranged, not including Eric and Olga. Government cars are waiting. Hilary leaves.

== Cast ==
- Hilary - Alec Guinness
- Bron - Rachel Kempson
- Eric - Bruce Bould
- Olga - Heather Canning
- Veronica - Faith Brook
- Duff - John Phillips

The play directed by Clifford Williams. The play was revived in London in 2006 starring Timothy West.

== Critical reaction ==
Bernard Levin in the Sunday Times: “It is written in language that is at once a feast for the ear, the mind and the aesthetic sense. Mr Bennett writes beautifully, by which I must not be taken to mean anything precious or fey; his prose is virile and bright, but it is shaped by a master of English, and - more important - one who clearly loves his native tongue and revels in its infinite scope and flexibility.”

Irving Wardle in The Times: “Never has Bennett found an apter form for the things he does best: Hilary improvising a Times obituary, or a mock-Buchan Buchan thriller, or isolating the fatuities of English good manners in the unlikeliest context.”

Michael Billington in the Guardian: “A wittily intelligent examination of the entrenched irony that is both a national characteristic and a psychological prison.”

Harold Hobson in Drama: ”Guinness's is a very remarkable performance of a man who preserves all the outward marks of an English gentleman, but whose heart has died within him. He is not really afraid; he has no regret; his mind is as sharp as ever, but inside him there is nothing; whatever spiritual force he ever had is now totally exhausted; and the looks of pain and weariness that occasionally sweep over his tired face demand and receive pity where perhaps pity should not be... This is the sort of play which in compassion, skill, wit, and its heartrending efforts to assuage bewildered grief with religious ritual learned in childhood spreads a glory over the English theatre.”

Ronald Bergan: “Alec Guinness’s dry delivery and perfect timing enabled him to ride Bennett’s winged hobby-horses with consummate ease.”

David Benedict in Variety: “Bennett is so good on English mores — his perennial favorite topic, as the vastly superior Broadway-bound The History Boys shows — because he genuinely wrestles with his subject’s contradictions. His mind is not made up, making his smartly written views tarter and funnier than any other dramatist’s.”
