= Richard Griffiths =

English actor (1947–2013)

Richard Griffiths OBE
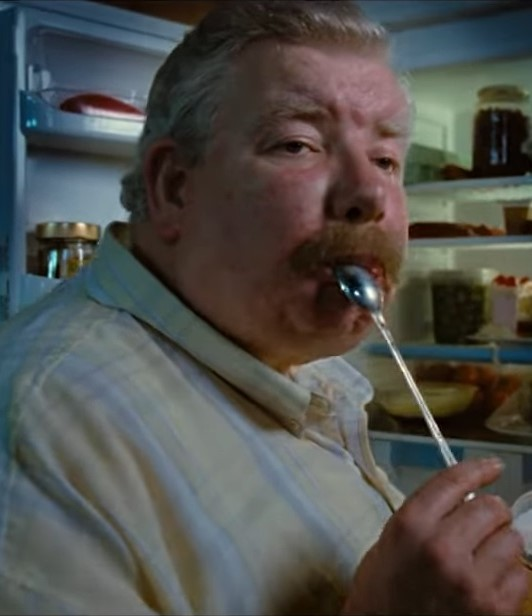
- Griffiths as Vernon Dursley in Harry Potter and the Order of the Phoenix (2007)
- Born: Richard Thomas Griffiths; 31 July 1947; Thornaby-on-Tees, North Riding of Yorkshire, England
- Died: 28 March 2013 (aged 65); Coventry, West Midlands, England
- Resting place: St Mary the Virgin Churchyard, Bearley, Warwickshire
- Education: Manchester Polytechnic School of Drama
- Occupation: Actor
- Years active: 1974–2013
- Notable work: Harry Potter; Withnail and I
- Spouse: Heather Gibson (m. 1980)
- Awards: See awards section

Richard Thomas Griffiths (31 July 1947 – 28 March 2013) was an English actor. He was known for his portrayals of Vernon Dursley in the Harry Potter films (2001–2011), Uncle Monty in Withnail and I (1987), and Henry Crabbe in Pie in the Sky (1994–1997). He received numerous accolades in his career and was appointed an Officer of the Order of the British Empire (OBE) by Queen Elizabeth II in 2008.

For his performance in the stage play The History Boys, Griffiths won the Tony Award for Best Actor in a Play and a Laurence Olivier Award in the same category. For the 2006 film adaptation, Griffiths was nominated for the BAFTA Award for Best Actor in a Leading Role. Griffiths is also known for his performances at the National Theatre including Equus (2008), The Habit of Art (2010), and The Sunshine Boys (2012).

Griffiths had supporting roles in such critically acclaimed films as Chariots of Fire (1981), The French Lieutenant's Woman (1981), Gandhi (1982), A Private Function (1984), Venus (2006), Ballet Shoes (2007), and Hugo (2011). He also acted in The Naked Gun 2½: The Smell of Fear (1991), Sleepy Hollow (1999), The Hitchhiker's Guide to the Galaxy (2005), and Pirates of the Caribbean: On Stranger Tides (2011).

== Early life and education ==
Richard Thomas Griffiths was born in Thornaby-on-Tees, North Riding of Yorkshire, to Jane (née Denmark, 1923–1969) and Thomas Griffiths (1915–1976). His father was a steelworker who also fought in pubs for money, while his mother's occupation was described as "bagger".

He had an elder sister and two brothers, all of whom died in infancy before he was born. A younger brother, whom he did not want to talk about because he had promised his family not to mention them in press, survived.

He was brought up as a Roman Catholic.

As a boy, he was so skinny that he was given radiation therapy on his pituitary gland when he was eight years old. This permanently slowed his metabolism, making him struggle with obesity for the rest of his life.

His parents were both deaf and he became fluent in British Sign Language at an early age. During his childhood he attempted to run away from home many times. He dropped out of Our Lady & St Bede School in Stockton-on-Tees at the age of 15 and worked as a porter for Littlewoods for a while but his boss eventually persuaded him to go back to school. He decided to attend a drama class at Stockton & Billingham College. He continued his education in drama at Manchester Polytechnic School of Theatre (now Manchester School of Theatre) at the same time as Bernard Hill.

== Career ==
After graduating, Griffiths won a contract on BBC Radio with their Radio Drama Company. He also worked in small theatres, sometimes acting and sometimes managing. He built up an early reputation as a Shakespearean clown with portrayals of Pompey in Measure for Measure and Bottom in A Midsummer Night's Dream with the Royal Shakespeare Company and went on to play the Kings in Love's Labour's Lost and in Henry VIII. He eventually settled in Manchester and began to get lead roles in plays. From there, he began to appear on television and then got his big break in film in It Shouldn't Happen to a Vet (1976). By the early 1980s, he was selected for the lead role in Bird of Prey, an early computer-conspiracy thriller. His character Henry Jay was reprised in Bird of Prey 2 (1984). In 1981, he also gave a memorable performance as Chilean secret police victim William Beausire in an edition of the BBC Prisoners of Conscience series. Griffiths went on to supporting roles in a number of major films, including The French Lieutenant's Woman, Chariots of Fire and Gandhi. On stage, in 1985–1986, he performed the role of Verdi in Julian Mitchell's After Aida, in Wales and at the Old Vic Theatre in London. He appeared in The World of Peter Rabbit and Friends.

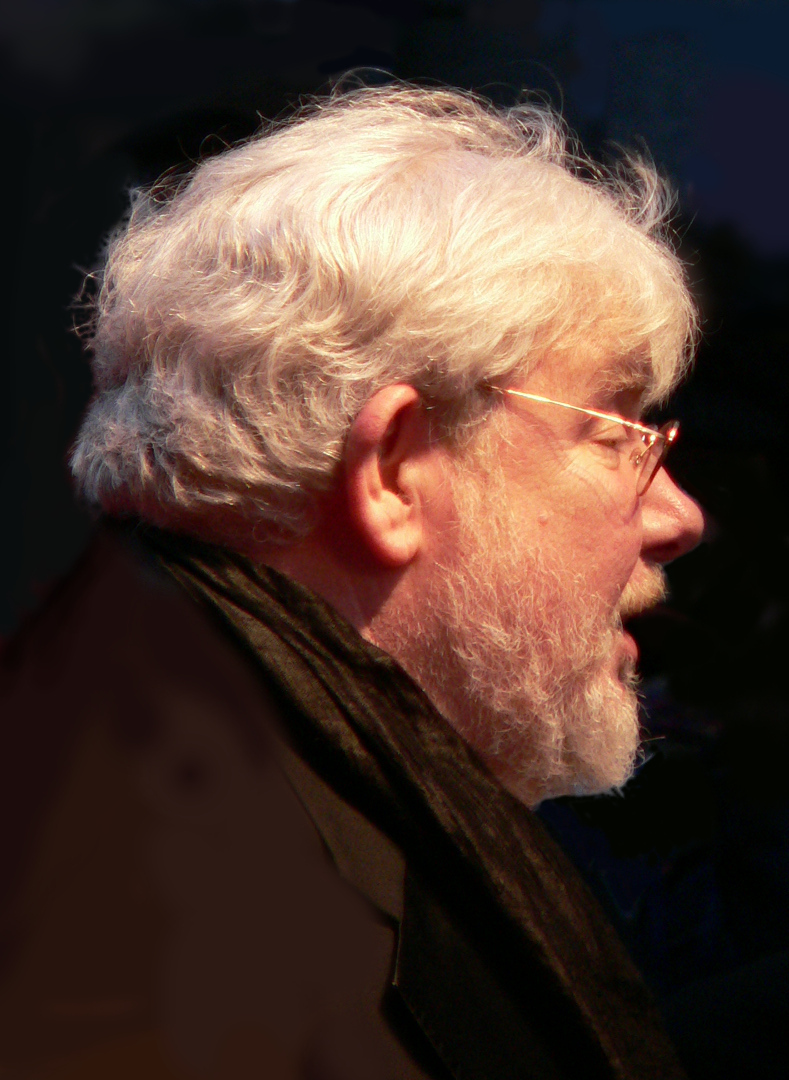
Griffiths at the 61st British Academy Film Awards in 2007

Griffiths' film roles were in both contemporary and period pieces. Some of his most memorable roles included supporting parts in films as Gorky Park (1983), Withnail and I (1987), King Ralph (1991), The Naked Gun 2 1/2: The Smell of Fear (1991), Blame It on the Bellboy (1992), Guarding Tess (1994) and Sleepy Hollow (1999). Later, he portrayed the short-tempered Vernon Dursley in the Harry Potter series, appearing in five of the eight films: Philosopher's Stone, Chamber of Secrets, Prisoner of Azkaban, Order of the Phoenix and Deathly Hallows – Part 1.

He appeared as Inspector Henry Crabbe, disillusioned policeman and pie chef extraordinaire, in Pie in the Sky, a role which was created for him. He also made an extended appearance in the 2005 version of Charles Dickens' Bleak House. In 2004, he originated the role of Hector (the teacher) in Alan Bennett's play The History Boys, directed by Nicholas Hytner, winning the 2005 Laurence Olivier Award for Best Actor. During the play's United States run, he won a Drama Desk Award, an Outer Critics Circle Award and a Tony Award. He reprised his role in the film version, which was released in October 2006. In 2007 he starred in Ballet Shoes with his Harry Potter co-stars Emma Watson and Gemma Jones.

Together with his Harry Potter co-star Daniel Radcliffe, he appeared in a stage revival of Peter Shaffer's Equus at the Gielgud Theatre in London and later, from October 2008, in a short run of the play at the Broadhurst Theatre on Broadway, which ended in February 2009. Later in 2009, he replaced Michael Gambon as W. H. Auden prior to the premiere of The Habit of Art at the National Theatre, once again directed by Hytner.

Griffiths was considered for the part of the Fifth Doctor in Doctor Who, following Tom Baker's departure in 1981, but was unavailable. He was strongly considered once again to take on the role of the Eighth Doctor, had the series continued past 1989. He performed in adaptations of the Hitchhiker's Guide to the Galaxy, providing the voice for Slartibartfast for the radio adaptation of Life, the Universe and Everything and playing the Vogon Jeltz in the film version of The Hitchhiker's Guide to the Galaxy. He appeared in Bedtime Stories with Adam Sandler and as a special guest in A Muppets Christmas: Letters to Santa.

In 2005, he asked a member of the audience to leave a performance of Heroes after her phone rang three times. Such interruptions due to audience distractions happened three times in his career.

Griffiths appeared in a cameo as King George II in Disney's Pirates of the Caribbean: On Stranger Tides. He appeared in the first episode of the television series Episodes as Julian Bullard. In April 2012, Griffiths starred, with Danny DeVito, in a revival of the Neil Simon play The Sunshine Boys. The show previewed at the Savoy Theatre from 27 April 2012, opening on 17 May and playing a limited 12-week season until 28 July.

== Personal life ==
Griffiths met Heather Gibson in 1973 and they married in 1980. They had no children. Griffiths was awarded an honorary degree from Teesside University in 2006 and was appointed an Officer of the Order of the British Empire (OBE) in the 2008 New Year Honours.

He was the godfather of comedian Jack Whitehall.

Griffiths died aged 65 in Coventry, West Midlands on 28 March 2013 after complications following heart surgery.

== Filmography ==
=== Film ===
Year	Title	Role	Notes
1977	It Shouldn't Happen to a Vet	Sam Broadbent	
1980	Breaking Glass	Studio engineer	
1980	Superman II	Terrorist #3	
1981	Chariots of Fire	Head Porter at Caius College	
1981	The French Lieutenant's Woman	Sir Tom	
1981	Ragtime	Delmas' Assistant No. 1	
1982	Britannia Hospital	Cheerful Bernie	
1982	Gandhi	Collins	
1983	Gorky Park	Anton	
1984	Greystoke: The Legend of Tarzan	Captain Billings	
1984	A Private Function	Henry Allardyce the Accountant	
1986	Shanghai Surprise	Willie Tuttle	
1987	Withnail and I	Uncle Monty	
1991	King Ralph	Duncan Phipps	
1991	The Naked Gun 2 1/2: The Smell of Fear	Dr. Albert S. Meinheimer / Earl Hacker	
1992	Blame It on the Bellboy	Maurice Horton	
1994	Guarding Tess	Frederick	
1995	Funny Bones	Jim Minty	
1997	The Warrens		
1999	Sleepy Hollow	Magistrate Philipse	
1999	Casper & Spooky		
2000	Vatel	Dr. Bourdelot	
2001	Harry Potter and the Philosopher's Stone	Vernon Dursley	
2002	Harry Potter and the Chamber of Secrets	Vernon Dursley	
2004	Harry Potter and the Prisoner of Azkaban	Vernon Dursley	
2004	Stage Beauty	Sir Charles Sedley	
2005	The Hitchhiker's Guide to the Galaxy	Jeltz	Voice
2005	Opa!	Tierrney	
2006	Venus	Donald	
2006	The History Boys	Hector	
2007	Harry Potter and the Order of the Phoenix	Vernon Dursley	
2008	Bedtime Stories	Barry Nottingham	
2010	National Theatre Live: The Habit of Art	Fitz / W. H. Auden	
2010	Jackboots on Whitehall	Hermann Göring	Voice
2010	Harry Potter and the Deathly Hallows – Part 1	Vernon Dursley	
2011	Pirates of the Caribbean: On Stranger Tides	King George II	
2011	Hugo	Monsieur Frick	
2012	Private Peaceful	The Colonel	
2013	About Time	Defence Lawyer in play (uncredited)	Posthumous release; Final film role

=== Television ===
Year	Title	Role	Notes
1974	Crown Court	Interpreter	Episode 3.31: "Duress: Part 1"
1974	Village Hall	Mr. Ridealgh	Episode 1.1: "Mr. Ellis Versus the People"
1974	ITV Playhouse	Park keeper	Episode 7.2: "Norma"
1976	When the Boat Comes In	P.C. Price	Episode 1.1 "A Land Fit for Heroes and Idiots"
1976	Red Letter Day	Window cleaner	Episode 1.3: "Well Thank You, Thursday"
1976	The Expert	Ripley	Episode 4.10: "Tainted Money"
1977	Second City Firsts		Episode 8.1: "Twelve Off the Belt"
1977	ITV Playhouse	Board member	Episode 9.10: "It's Only Rock 'n' Roll"
1978	The Comedy of Errors	Officer	TV play
1978	The Sweeney	Ronnie Harries	Episode 4.14: "Jack or Knave"
1979	Afternoon Off	Mr. Turnbull	TV play
1980	Nobody's Perfect	Sam Hooper	14 episodes
1981	Prisoners of Conscience	William Beausire	Episode 1.1: "William Beausire"
1982	Minder	Derek Farrow	Episode: "Dreamhouse"
1982	Whoops Apocalypse	Premier Dubienkin	Episode: "Set the Controls for the Heart of the Sun"
1982	Bird of Prey	Henry Jay	4 episodes
1982	The World Cup: A Captain's Tale	Sidney Barron	TV film
1982	Five-Minute Films	The Window Cleaner	Episode: "A Light Snack"
1982	The Merry Wives of Windsor	Sir John Falstaff	Part of the BBC Television Shakespeare series
1983	The Cleopatras	Pot Belly	3 episodes
1983	Bergerac	Jean-Pierre	Episode 2.6: "Fall of a Birdman"
1984	Bird of Prey 2	Henry Jay	4 episodes
1985	Bleak House	Mr Bayham Badger	BBC TV serial
1986	Boon	Sidney Garbutt	Episode: "Glasshouse People"
1987	Casanova	Cardinal	TV film
1987	Ffizz	Jack Mowbray	12 episodes
1987	The Marksman	Brown	TV mini-series
1988–90	A Kind of Living	Trevor Beasley	15 episodes
1989	Goldeneye	Second admiral	TV film
1989	Plum, A Portrait of P.G. Wodehouse	P.G. Wodehouse (voice)	BBC documentary
1991	Perfect Scoundrels	Phil Kirby	Episode: "Ssh, You Know Who"
1992	El C.I.D.	Weatherby	Episode: "Nothing Is Forever"
1992	The Good Guys	Archie Phillips	Episode: "Going West"
1992	Mr. Wakefield's Crusade	Porter	TV film
1993	Inspector Morse	Canon Humphrey Appleton	Episode: "The Day of the Devil"
1993	Lovejoy	Hans Koopman	Episode: "They Call Me Midas"
1994	A Breed of Heroes	Brian Beazely	TV film
1993–95	The World of Peter Rabbit and Friends	Various (voice)	3 episodes
1994–97	Pie in the Sky	Henry Crabbe	All 40 episodes
1998	In the Red	Geoffrey Crichton-Potter	Episode 1.3
1998	The Canterbury Tales	Saturn (voice)	Episode: "Leaving London"
1998	Oi! Get Off Our Train	Elephant (voice)	TV short
1998	Ted & Ralph	Landowner at Party	TV film
1998–00	Archibald the Koala	Archibald (voice)	Episode: The Dragon
1999	The Vicar of Dibley	Bishop of Mulberry	Episode: "Spring"
2000	Gormenghast	Swelter	TV mini-series; 2 episodes
2000	Hope and Glory	Leo Wheeldon	10 episodes
2002	TLC	Mr Benedict Ron	6 episodes
2002	Jeffrey Archer: The Truth	Willie Whitelaw	TV film
2003	The Brides in the Bath	Sir Edward Marshall Hall	TV film
2005	Princes in the Tower	Sir Thomas More (voice)	TV film
2005	Bleak House	Mr. Bayham Badger	2 episodes
2007	Ballet Shoes	Great Uncle Matthew Brown "Gum"	TV film
2008	A Muppets Christmas: Letters to Santa	Santa Claus	TV film
2010	National Theatre Live	Fitz / W. H. Auden	TV play: The Habit of Art
2011	George and Bernard Shaw	Bernard	Episode: "Pilot"
2011	Episodes	Julian Bullard	Episode: "Episode One"
2012	The Hollow Crown – Henry V	Duke of Burgundy	TV film

== Theatre ==
Year	Production	Role	Venue	Ref.
1974	Measure for Measure	Abhorson/Guard	The Royal Shakespeare Theatre	
1974	The Tempest	Gonzalo	The Other Palace, London	
1976–77	The Comedy of Errors	Officer	The Royal Shakespeare Theatre	
1976–77	Romeo and Juliet	Peter	The Royal Shakespeare Theatre	
1977	The Days of the Commune	Thiers	Aldwych Theatre, London	
1978	The Tempest	Trinculo	The Royal Shakespeare Theatre	
1978–79	Measure for Measure	Pompey	The Royal Shakespeare Theatre	
1978	A Miserable and Lonely Death	Dr. Gordon	Donmar Warehouse, London	
1983–84	Volpone	Volpone	The Other Place, London	
2004–05	The History Boys	Hector	Lyttelton Theatre, London	
2006	The History Boys	Hector	Broadhurst Theatre, Broadway	
2008–09	Equus	Martin Dysart	Broadhurst Theatre, Broadway	
2010	The Habit of Art	Fitz/W. H. Auden	Lyttelton Theatre, London	
2012	The Sunshine Boys	Al	Savoy Theatre, London	

== Awards and nominations ==
Year	Award	Category	Nominated work	Result	Ref.
1979	Laurence Olivier Awards	Best Comedy Performance	Once in a Lifetime	Nominated	
1981	Clarence Derwent Awards	Best Supporting Male	—N/a	Won	
2003	Phoenix Film Critics Society Awards	Best Acting Ensemble	Harry Potter and the Chamber of Secrets	Nominated	
2005	Laurence Olivier Awards	Best Actor	The History Boys	Won	
2006	Tony Award	Best Actor in a Play	The History Boys	Won	
2006	Drama Desk Award	Outstanding Actor in a Play	The History Boys	Won	
2006	Outer Critics Circle Award	Best Actor in a Play	The History Boys	Won	
2006	Theatre World Award	—N/a	The History Boys	Won	
2006	Laurence Olivier Awards	Best Actor	Heroes	Nominated	
2007	British Academy Film Awards	Best Actor in a Leading Role	The History Boys	Nominated	
2007	London Film Critics' Circle	Best Actor of the Year	The History Boys	Nominated	
2007	Chlotrudis Awards	Best Supporting Actor	The History Boys	Nominated	
