= Joan Scott =

Joan Scott may refer to:

- Joan Wallach Scott (born 1941), American historian
- Joan LaCour Scott (1921–2012), American screenwriter
- Joan Scott (actress) (1920–1997), British actress in Sleeping Murder
- Joan Canning, 1st Viscountess Canning (née Scott, 1771–1816), wife of George Canning
- Joan McKowen, born Joan Scott, Australian ice hockey figure
