= The Wind in the Willows (play) =

1990 play by Alan Bennett

- Original language: English
- Written by: Alan Bennett
- Based on: The Wind in the Willows by Kenneth Grahame
- Music by: Jeremy Sams

Premiere
- Date: 12 December 1990
- Place: Olivier Theatre, Royal National Theatre, London

The Wind in the Willows is a play based on the 1908 children's novel of the same name by Kenneth Grahame, adapted for the stage by Alan Bennett, with music by Jeremy Sams.

== Production history ==
The play made its world premiere on 1 December 1990 over the festive period in the Olivier Theatre at the Royal National Theatre, London directed by Nicholas Hytner and designed by Mark Thompson. The production starred Griff Rhys Jones as Toad, David Bamber as Mole, Richard Briers as Rat and Michael Bryant as Badger. Due to the success of the production, it returned on 12 December 1991 for another festive season starring Desmond Barrit as Toad, Adrian Scarborough as Mole, David Ross as Ratty and Bryant returning as Badger.

In 1994, the National Theatre production transferred to The Old Vic where the set design by Mark Thompson had to be modified for its proscenium arch stage. The production was directed by Jeremy Sams and starred Jeremy Sinden as Toad.

== Cast and characters ==
| Character | Original National Theatre Cast | National Theatre revival |
| Character | 1990 | 1991 |
|---|---|---|
| Toad | Griff Rhys Jones | Desmond Barrit |
| Mole | David Bamber | Adrian Scarborough |
| Rat | Richard Briers | David Ross |
| Badger | Michael Bryant | Michael Bryant |
| Otter | John Matshikiza | |
| Albert (a horse) | Terence Rigby | Barry Stanton |
| Rabbit | Charlotte Metcalf | |
| Rabbit / Passenger | Tricia Morrish | |
| Hedgehog / Clerk of the Court | Mike Murray | Roger Swaine |
| Hedgehog / Washerwoman | Mona Hammond | Maria Charles |
| Stoat / Gipsy | James Goode | |
| | Guy Moore | |
| Chief Weasel | Tim McMullan | Robin Sneller |

== Awards and nominations ==
=== Original London production ===
| Year | Award | Category | Nominee | Result |
|---|---|---|---|---|
| 1991 | Laurence Olivier Awards | Best Comedy Performance | Griff Rhys Jones | Nominated |
| 1991 | Laurence Olivier Awards | Best Comedy Performance | Richard Briers | Nominated |
| 1991 | Laurence Olivier Awards | Best Director of a Play | Nicholas Hytner | Nominated |
| 1991 | Laurence Olivier Awards | Best Set Designer | Mark Thompson | Won |
| 1991 | Laurence Olivier Awards | Best Costume Designer | Mark Thompson | Nominated |
| 1991 | Laurence Olivier Awards | Best Lighting Designer | Paul Pyant | Nominated |
