= People (play) =

Play by Alan Bennett

People is a play by the English playwright Alan Bennett.

== Cast and characters ==
Character	National Theatre cast (2012)	UK tour cast (2013)
Theodore	Peter Egan	Paul Moriarty
Dorothy Stacpoole	Frances de la Tour	Siân Phillips
Bevan	Miles Jupp	Simon Bubb
Iris	Linda Bassett	Brigit Forsyth
June Stacpoole	Selina Cadell	Selina Cadell
Ralph Lumsdem	Nicholas Le Prevost	Michael Thomas
Bishop	Andy de la Tour	
Bruce	Alistair Parker	Ieuan Rhys
Louise	Fraces Ashman	
Nigel	Giles Cooper	
Les	Jack Chissick	
Colin	Robin Pearce	
Brit	Jess Murphy	
Ensemble	Ellie Burrow Philip Childs Carole Dance Barbara Kirby Alexander Warner	

== Production history ==
The play premiered in the Lyttelton Theatre at the National Theatre, London on 31 October 2012, running until 3 May 2013. The production was directed by Nicholas Hytner and designed by Bob Crowley and starred Frances de la Tour, Nicholas le Prevost, Peter Egan and Linda Bassett in the cast. The play was captured by National Theatre Live and broadcast to cinemas worldwide on 21 March 2013.

A UK tour starring Siân Phillips, Brigit Forsyth and Selina Cadell opened at the Birmingham Repertory Theatre from 3 to 21 September, before touring to Leicester Curve (24 to 28 September), Norwich Theatre Royal (1 – 5 October), Lowry Theatre, Salford (15 to 19 October), Marlowe Theatre, Canterbury (22 to 26 October), Milton Keynes Theatre (29 October to 2 November), Leeds Grand Theatre (5 to 9 November) ending at Plymouth Theatre Royal (12 to 16 November).
