= The Uncommon Reader =

2007 novella by Alan Bennett

- A First edition of the novel
- Author: Alan Bennett
- Cover artist: Peter Campbell
- Language: English
- Publisher: Faber & Faber and Profile Books
- Publication date: 2007
- Publication place: England
- Media type: Hardback
- Pages: 124
- ISBN: 978-1-84668-049-6
- OCLC: NA

The Uncommon Reader is a novella by Alan Bennett. After appearing in the London Review of Books, Vol. 29, No. 5 (8 March 2007), it was published later that year in book form by Faber & Faber and Profile Books. An audiobook version read by the author was released in 2007.

== Plot ==
The title's "uncommon reader" (Queen Elizabeth II) becomes obsessed with books after she chances to encounter the City of Westminster's mobile library, and feels she should borrow a book. She borrows a novel by Ivy Compton-Burnett, then one by Nancy Mitford, and becomes an avid reader. The story follows the consequences of this obsession for the Queen, her household and advisers, and her constitutional position.

== Reception ==
The novella was well received. Writing in the Guardian, Nicholas Lezard described it as "a piece of audacious lèse majesté which, in an earlier age, would have put its author's head on a spike". The Washington Post said it was "an uncommonly enjoyable and funny read, a flight of imagination about what would happen if the Queen of England suddenly became an avid reader (and then a writer)." New Zealand journalist Adam Dudding described it as a "quirky fantasy" which was "a witty and engaging... advertisement for the delights of reading" and an "affectionate portrait of the Queen."
