= Talking Heads (British TV series) =

British television drama series

- Title screen of the first series, with animated characterisation of Alan Bennett.
- Also known as: Alan Bennett's Talking Heads
- Created by: Alan Bennett
- Starring: Alan Bennett; Maggie Smith; Julie Walters; Patricia Routledge; Thora Hird; David Haig; Eileen Atkins; Penelope Wilton; Stephanie Cole
- Music by: George Fenton
- Country of origin: United Kingdom
- Original language: English
- No. of series: 3
- No. of episodes: 15 (including stand-alone play)

Production
- Producer: Innes Lloyd
- Running time: 30–40 mins

Original release
- Network: BBC One (1988, 2020); BBC Two (1998)
- Release: 19 April – 24 May 1988
- Release: 6 October – 11 November 1998
- Release: 23 June – 9 July 2020

Talking Heads is a 1988 TV series of dramatic monologues written for BBC television by British playwright Alan Bennett. The first series was broadcast on BBC1 in 1988, and adapted for radio on BBC Radio 4 in 1991. A second series was broadcast on BBC Two in 1998. They have since been included on the A-level and GCSE English Literature syllabus. Some episodes aired on PBS in the United States as part of its Masterpiece Theatre programme.

In 2020, the BBC released a new series of Talking Heads including remakes of 10 of the original monologues and two new episodes written by Bennett in 2019.

== Summary ==
There are two series of Talking Heads, six monologues in each, along with an earlier (1982) play, A Woman of No Importance, which, while not released alongside Talking Heads, generally fits into the canon. Although the plays deal with a variety of subjects, there are certain recurring themes, such as death, illness, guilt and isolation. All of the characters are childless with the notable exception of Muriel in "Soldiering On"; Violet in "Waiting for the Telegram" is told she has a son, but she does not remember him.

Most of the plays give some hint as to where they are set, mostly in Leeds, although not (as Bennett stresses) the "real" Leeds, but rather one that exists in his head. For example, Matthias Robinson, in which Miss Fozzard works, closed in the 1970s.

== Cast and crew ==
Each episode consists of an individual monologue and therefore in most episodes only one character appears. Julie Walters, Patricia Routledge and Thora Hird appear as different characters in both series.

The show was produced by Innes Lloyd and Ralph Wilton (series 1) and Mark Shivas (series 2), while Alan Bennett, Stuart Burge, Giles Foster, Tristram Powell, Gavin Millar, Patrick Garland, Stuart Garland and Udayan Prasad directed individual episodes. The music was written by George Fenton.

== Episodes ==
Actors are named for the earlier of the BBC television versions.

=== Stand-alone play ===
"A Woman of No Importance" – (19 November 1982)

- Patricia Routledge plays Miss Schofield

Peggy Schofield, clerical worker and self-described linchpin of her office, finds that when her strict regime is disrupted, her world crumbles around her. Her health deteriorates and she is rapidly spirited away to hospital, where she reconstructs her office routine, appropriating doctors, other hospital staff and patients as replacements for her co-workers. It is suggested that she is not as popular or significant as she assumed, and her office swiftly moves on without her. As she grows sicker and weaker, she does not acknowledge the severity of her condition and is left to die alone.

=== Series 1 ===
Talking Heads 1 – (19 April to 24 May 1988)

- Alan Bennett plays Graham Whittaker in "A Chip in the Sugar"

Mild, middle-aged Graham Whittaker (who we learn is a repressed homosexual with a history of mild mental health problems) finds life becoming complicated as his mother, with whom he still lives, reunites with an old flame named Frank Turnbull. Graham becomes increasingly jealous when Mr Turnbull takes an ever-growing hold on Mam, especially when Frank proposes marriage while simultaneously suggesting Graham move out of the house to a hostel. But Mr Turnbull is hiding a secret, and when Graham finds out he triumphantly confronts his mother with the information, restoring the status quo and his comfortable life, but destroying her hopes of happiness in the process.

- Patricia Routledge plays Irene Ruddock in "A Lady of Letters"

Irene Ruddock is a working class single woman living near Bradford who is not afraid to speak, or rather write, her mind: she writes letters to her MP, the police, the chemist – everyone she can, to remedy the social ills she sees around her. After one too many accusations of misconduct from Irene's pen, she is sent to prison – where, for the first time in her life, she feels free and happy.

- Maggie Smith plays Susan in "Bed Among the Lentils"

Susan, an alcoholic, nervous vicar's wife who has to travel into Leeds to go to the off-licence because of her debts with the local shop keeper, distracts herself from her ambitious, and, as she sees him, vainly insensitive husband and his doting parishioners by conducting an affair with a nearby grocer, Ramesh Ramesh the third, discovering something about herself and God in the process. She does not feel cheated when Ramesh Ramesh moves on to marry. (Anna Massey took the role in the BBC Audio Tape version.)

- Stephanie Cole plays Muriel Carpenter in "Soldiering On"

Muriel is a strong woman, and always has been – a pillar of the community, a regular charity worker, and a volunteer for Meals on Wheels; and looking after her mentally ill daughter, Margaret, has fortified her resolve. So, after the death of her husband Ralph, Muriel is well-prepared to cope with the crisis. However, given her son Giles' ineptitude (or dishonesty) with money, and the vile secret behind Margaret's illness, Muriel finds that she needs to adapt in order to 'soldier on'.

- Julie Walters plays Lesley in "Her Big Chance"

Lesley is an aspiring actress, who, after a series of unpromising extra roles on television programmes such as Crossroads, finds what she believes to be her big break as the adventurous Travis in a new film for the West German market. It is not clear to what extent Lesley understands that she is appearing in a soft pornographic film.

- Thora Hird plays Doris in "A Cream Cracker under the Settee"

Doris, aged seventy-five, is a tidy woman — and when she suffers a fall after trying to clear up after her considerably less thorough home help, Zulema, it becomes apparent that her constant nagging may have been responsible for her husband's early death. Alone and injured, she wonders whether the only place left for her in society is a care home which she distrusts. Resisting this with all her being, she decides she'd rather die on her own in considerable pain than live in a care home 'smelling of pee'.

=== Series 2 ===
Talking Heads 2 – (6 October to 11 November 1998)

- Patricia Routledge plays Miss Fozzard in "Miss Fozzard Finds Her Feet"

Miss Fozzard is a lonely, middle-aged department-store clerk in Soft Furnishings whose free time is mostly spent caring for her brother after he suffers a stroke. Her one joy is visiting her chiropodist, but, when he retires, she finds her life consumed with a burgeoning relationship with his replacement, Mr Dunderdale, who is a decidedly kinky fellow with an all-consuming foot fetish. While Miss Fozzard would be the last to admit it, she ventures into benign prostitution as she allows her new chiropodist to pay her to model a variety of footwear whilst also indulging in other activities. It is this that gives her the satisfaction her life was missing, as she begins to stop caring what other people think.

- Eileen Atkins plays Celia in "The Hand of God"

Celia is a covetous antiques dealer who brazenly aids elderly neighbours for the sole purpose of being in a good position to buy their treasures on the cheap when they die. She's particularly put out when one elderly woman whom she's visited, living in a house chock full of antiques, dies and leaves everything to a distant Canadian relative. Celia is somewhat soothed when the Canadian gives her a small box of the woman's things, which includes a curious drawing of a finger. Celia is particularly pleased she makes a hundred pounds selling the frame around the picture, but then later learns to her horror that the drawing is a lost Michelangelo masterpiece worth millions, which the buyer says on national television he bought in a "junk shop". The figure is a study of the central image of the hand of God on the ceiling of the Sistine Chapel.

- David Haig plays Wilfred Paterson in "Playing Sandwiches"

Wilfred is, we discover over time, a reformed paedophile living under a false identity and working as a much-praised maintenance man in a public park. However, as a superior begins to pressure him for bureaucratic historical information to include in his personnel file, the pressure causes Wilfred to resume his old ways, with horrifying results. Incarcerated, he contemplates his condition, remarking 'It's the one part of my life that feels right... and that's the bit that's wrong.'

- Julie Walters plays Marjory in "The Outside Dog"

Clean freak Marjory gradually comes to realise that her husband, Stuart, who works in a slaughterhouse, is using his employment to cover the fact he's a particularly dangerous criminal. He regularly goes out with his Alsatian, Tina (whom Marjory has barred from entering the house), and returns late at night. This usually culminates in brutal sexual advances which Marjory finds distasteful but feels powerless to reject. She is so alienated from the outside world that she subsumes all emotion in her domestic routine – her control of which becomes gradually more threatened as her husband becomes the subject of both police and media attention. When he is arrested and tried for a series of murders, Marjory struggles to maintain a low profile, and to continue with her routine as normal, but in the process discovers a damning piece of evidence which links her husband to the killings. However, she receives a telephone call announcing he has been acquitted (due to lack of evidence), before she is able to decide upon a course of action. When he returns home, Marjory now has to deal with the horrific realisation she'll be sharing her home with a serial murderer. As an ultimate sign of her lapsed control, Tina finally gains entry into the house. Marjory contemplates making the evidence known.

- Penelope Wilton plays Rosemary Horrocks in "Nights in the Gardens of Spain"

Rosemary Horrocks is a lonely woman whose husband is intent on moving them both to Marbella. Unknown to him, Rosemary does not wish to go. She takes it upon herself to tend to a female neighbour's garden after the latter is arrested for murdering her abusive husband. The two women become close friends in a tender relationship which has the potential to bring both of them real happiness. As the case of her newfound friend is investigated, a darker and more perverted side of Rosemary's own husband is revealed. Sadly, Rosemary's neighbour dies of cancer before the potential of their friendship can be fully realised, and Rosemary must passively continue with the non-marriage she has with her highly repressed, golf-playing husband.

- Thora Hird plays Violet in "Waiting for the Telegram"

Violet is a confused, elderly woman in a nursing home who has been told by the excited staff she will soon be receiving a congratulatory telegram from the Queen in honour of her one hundredth birthday. This, however, perplexes Violet as she wanders far back in her memory to an age where telegrams brought news of death on a battlefield. Violet ruminates about a long-lost love to her only real friend, a gay male nurse at the home named Francis, who ultimately dies of AIDS.

=== 2020 Series ===
Talking Heads 3 – (23 June to 9 July 2020)

Filmed on abandoned EastEnders sets during the lockdown for COVID-19 in 2020, the BBC released a new series of Talking Heads including remakes of 10 of the original monologues and two new episodes written by Bennett in 2019.

- Sarah Lancashire plays Gwen Fedder in "An Ordinary Woman"

Michael is only 15, but you wouldn't know. Gwen thought there would be something that gave you immunity, that you couldn't fall for your own child.

- Monica Dolan plays Lorna in "The Shrine"

Lorna visits the spot where Clifford's motorbike crashed, hoping for some closure. But one day she finds someone else has left some flowers on the shrine.

Ten of the original monologues were performed with new actors.

- Imelda Staunton plays Irene Ruddock in "A Lady of Letters"
- Harriet Walter plays Muriel Carpenter in "Soldiering On"
- Jodie Comer plays Lesley in "Her Big Chance"
- Lucian Msamati plays Wilfred Paterson in "Playing Sandwiches"
- Martin Freeman plays Graham Whittaker in "A Chip in the Sugar"
- Rochenda Sandall plays Marjory in "The Outside Dog"
- Lesley Manville plays Susan in "Bed Among the Lentils"
- Tamsin Greig plays Rosemary Horrocks in "Nights in the Gardens of Spain"
- Kristin Scott Thomas plays Celia in "The Hand of God"
- Maxine Peake plays Miss Fozzard in "Miss Fozzard Finds Her Feet"

The two Thora Hird monologues ("A Cream Cracker under the Settee" and "Waiting for the Telegram") were not remade.

== Nominations and awards ==
=== Series 1 (1988) ===
BAFTA TV Awards

Year	Category	Nominee(s)	Episode	Result
1989	Best Actress	Thora Hird	"A Cream Cracker under the Settee"	Won
1989	Best Actress	Patricia Routledge	"A Lady of Letters"	Nominated
1989	Best Actress	Maggie Smith	"Bed Among the Lentils"	Nominated
1989	Best Actor	Alan Bennett	"A Chip in the Sugar"	Nominated
1989	Best Drama Series	Alan Bennett, Innes Lloyd	"A Cream Cracker under the Settee"	Nominated
1989	Best Single Drama	Alan Bennett, Innes Lloyd	"Bed Among the Lentils"	Nominated
1989	Best Single Drama	Alan Bennett, Innes Lloyd, Giles Foster	"A Lady of Letters"	Nominated
1989	Best Video Lighting	Clive Thomas	"A Cream Cracker under the Settee"	Nominated
1989	Best Lighting	Tony Burrough	N/A	Nominated
1989	Best Graphics	Mina Martinez	N/A	Nominated
1989	Best Original Television Music	George Fenton	N/A	Nominated

RTS Awards

Year	Category	Nominee(s)	Episode	Result
1989	Actor: Female	Maggie Smith	"Bed Among the Lentils"	Won

=== Series 2 (1998) ===
BAFTA TV Awards

Year	Category	Nominee(s)	Episode	Result
1999	Best Actress	Thora Hird	"Waiting for the Telegram"	Won
1999	Best Single Drama	Alan Bennett, Mark Shivas, Stuart Burge	"Waiting for the Telegram"	Nominated
1999	Best Single Drama	Alan Bennett, Mark Shivas, Udayan Prasad	"Playing Sandwiches"	Nominated

Peabody Awards

RTS Awards

Year	Category	Nominee(s)	Episode	Result
1999	Best Single Drama	Alan Bennett, Mark Shivas, Udayan Prasad	"Playing Sandwiches"	Nominated
1999	Actor: Female	Thora Hird	"Waiting for the Telegram"	Won

== Radio broadcasts ==
The nature of the monologues is that, despite being conceived for television, they can be broadcast unaltered in sound only. As such, they were re-broadcast on BBC Radio 4 between February and March 1991, the only difference being the inclusion of an introductory instalment with Bennett discussing their development. The second series did not appear on radio but received a CD release. "Bed Among the Lentils" was subsequently remade for BBC Radio 7 in 2008 with Anna Massey as Susan.

== Releases ==
The radio shows were released as two CDs in 1999. In 2007, the monologues were published as a book titled Talking Heads. There have also been a number of DVD and video releases, the most recent in 2005 entitled The Complete Talking Heads. This release also features Bennett's autobiographical Telling Tales monologues from 2000.

== Stage adaptations ==
A West End theatre production, also entitled Talking Heads, opened at the Comedy Theatre in January 1992 for a 10-week season, starring Patricia Routledge and Alan Bennett, who also directed, plus piano interludes by Jeremy Sams.

In 2002, seven of the pieces were performed at the Tiffany Theater in Los Angeles for a highly praised engagement. In 2003, the Los Angeles production was staged Off-Broadway, at the Minetta Lane Theatre with a few changes in casting and creative personnel, and replacement of one of its seven monologues. This version was recognised with Drama Desk and Outer Critics Circle award nominations, and won the Drama Desk Award for Outstanding Featured Actress (Lynn Redgrave), The Obie Award for Outstanding Performance, (Kathleen Chalfant, Daniel Davis, Christine Ebersole, Valerie Mahaffey, Redgrave, Brenda Wehle), and The Drama Critics' Circle Award for Best Foreign Play (Alan Bennett).

London's Bridge Theatre staged eight monologues from the 2020 television series in the months following their broadcast. Actors Lucian Msamati, Imelda Staunton, Tamsin Greig, Maxine Peake, Rochenda Sandall, Kristin Scott Thomas, Monica Dolan and Lesley Manville reprised their roles in four double bills. Martin Freeman, Jodie Comer, Harriet Walter and Sarah Lancashire appeared in the TV series, but not in the stage productions.
