= The Habit of Art =

Play written by Alan Bennett

- Original language: English
- Written by: Alan Bennett
- Characters: W. H. Auden; Benjamin Britten; Humphrey Carpenter
- Setting: London, present day; (Caliban's Day Oxford, 1972)

Premiere
- Date: 5 November 2009
- Place: Lyttelton Theatre, London, United Kingdom

The Habit of Art is a 2009 play by English playwright Alan Bennett, centred on a fictional meeting between W. H. Auden and Benjamin Britten while Britten is composing the opera Death in Venice. It premiered on 5 November 2009 at the Lyttelton Theatre at the Royal National Theatre, with the central roles filled by Alex Jennings as Britten and Richard Griffiths as Auden (the latter replacing Michael Gambon, who had to withdraw from the production due to minor ill health). The performance of April 22, 2010 was broadcast to more than 200 cinemas worldwide by NTLive.

== Synopsis ==
The Habit of Art centres on Fitz, Henry, Tim and Donald, who are actors rehearsing a play called Caliban's Day. (The title reflects Auden's view that The Tempest was incomplete and Caliban should have an epilogue.) The director has been called away, so they have a run-through/workshop directed by the stage manager, Kay, in the presence of the playwright, Neil.

Caliban's Day is about a fictitious meeting in 1972 in Auden's rooms at Oxford, between Auden (Fitz) in his latter years and Britten (Henry). Auden has hired a rent boy, Stuart (Tim) and when Humphrey Carpenter (Donald)—who will write biographies of both Auden and Britten after their deaths—arrives to interview him, Auden mistakes him for Stuart. Britten has been auditioning boys for Death in Venice nearby, and arrives unexpectedly (their first meeting in 25 years after they fell out over the failure of their opera Paul Bunyan). He wants to discuss his misgivings about the paedophilic theme of Death in Venice and the light that may cast on his own life, but Auden assumes Britten wants him to write the libretto.

The characters intermittently break out of the rehearsal to discuss the play, how accurately/harshly it should treat Auden's failings, the actor's craft and many other issues raised by Auden, Britten and the play. In doing so, they reveal something of their own backgrounds.

== Productions ==
The world premier production commenced on 5 November 2009 at the Lyttelton Theatre at the National Theatre, directed by Nicholas Hytner.

The play was revived in a new production by The Original Theatre Company, York Theatre Royal and Ghost Light Theatre Productions and toured the UK in late 2018.

The Habit of Art; characters and casts
Character in The Habit of Art	Character in Caliban's Day	World premier production, National Theatre, from 5 November 2009	UK touring production, autumn 2018
Fitz	W.H. Auden	Richard Griffiths	Matthew Kelly
Henry	Benjamin Britten	Alex Jennings	David Yelland
Donald	Humphrey Carpenter	Adrian Scarborough	John Wark
Tim	Stuart	Stephen Wight	Benjamin Chandler
Charlie	Singer	Laurence Belcher/Otto Farrant/Toby Graham	Alexandra Guelff
Brian (absent, except beginning of Part 2, read by 'Henry')	Boyle	Philip Childs	–
Penny (absent, read by 'Kay')	May	–	–
Read by 'Kay' and 'George'	Mirror, Chair, Bed, Door, Clock, Music, Words		Veronica Roberts, Alexandra Guelff
Neil	Author	Elliot Levey	Robert Mountford
Stephen (absent)	Director	–	–
Kay	Stage Manager	Frances de la Tour	Veronica Roberts
George	Assistant Stage Manager	John Heffernan	Alexandra Guelff
Joan	Chaperone	Barbara Kirby	–
Matt	Sound	Danny Burns	
Ralph	Dresser	Martin Chamberlain	
Tom	Rehearsal pianist	Tom Attwood	–
Creative Team
Director		Nicholas Hytner	Philip Franks
Designer		Bob Crowley	Adrian Linford
Lighting Designer		Mark Henderson	Johanna Town
Music		Matthew Scott	Max Pappenheim
Sound Designer		Paul Groothuis	Max Pappenheim
Company Voice Work		Kate Godfrey	
Production Manager		Diane Willmott	Tammy Rose
Stage Manager		David Marsland	Tim Speechley
Deputy Stage Manager		Fiona Bardsley	Judith Barrow
Assistant Stage Manager		Valerie Fox	Davey Williams
Props Supervisor		Chris Lake	Claire Aucache
Costume Supervisor		Janet Bench	Siobhan Boyd

The music by Britten includes: 'The Ash Grove', The Turn of the Screw, Peter Grimes and The Young Person's Guide to the Orchestra.

== Critical reception ==
Critical reaction to the original production of the play was generally positive. Michael Billington (The Guardian) said it was a 'superbly fluid production ... and is beautifully acted'; and Charles Spenser (The Telegraph) says 'The Habit of Art is another absolute cracker, often wonderfully and sometimes filthily funny'. However, Benedict Nightingale (The Times) was more critical and suggested that 'the play lacks dramatic tension', and Andrew Billen (New Statesman) said that the 'humour obscures the character of [the] play'. Critics identified and examined the themes of the play: 'a multi-levelled work that deals with sex, death, creativity, biography and much else besides', and one in which 'the knack of making ordinary people seem greater than they are, and revealing important people as being ordinarily human like the rest of us' (Peter Brown, London Theatre). Billington suggests that the play 'is at its strongest when it deals with the theme implicit in its title: the idea that, for the artist, creativity is a constant, if troubling imperative'. Spenser also notes of the author that 'there is a confidence here, a sense of a writer pushing himself to the limits ... that is hugely invigorating'. Brown says that 'whether you're an ardent Bennett fan or not, it's pretty much unmissable'.
