= Cocktail Sticks =

Play by Alan Bennett

Cocktail Sticks is an autobiographical play by the English playwright Alan Bennett. It premièred in the National Theatre in 2012 as part of a double bill (with the monologue Hymn). The production was directed by long-term Bennett collaborator Nicholas Hytner. It received great acclaim, and transferred to the Duchess Theatre in the West End of London. The role of Bennett was played by Alex Jennings.

An adaptation for radio was first broadcast on BBC Radio 4 on 3 January 2015, with Alex Jennings (and Alan Bennett himself) as Bennett, Jeff Rawle as Dad and Gabrielle Lloyd as Mam.
