= Single Spies =

Double bill written by Alan Bennett

- Written by: Alan Bennett
- Original language: English
- Genre: Comedy/Drama

Premiere
- Date premiered: 1988
- Place premiered: Lyttelton, National Theatre; London

Single Spies is a 1988 double bill written by the English playwright Alan Bennett. It consists of An Englishman Abroad and A Question of Attribution, the former an adaptation of a television play the author had written for the BBC in 1983. Both plays depict members of the Cambridge spy ring and touch on their moral, political and aesthetic beliefs: the first shows Guy Burgess in exile in Moscow in 1958, seven years after absconding from Britain. The second focuses on Sir Anthony Blunt while he still holds high office in the Royal Household although known to the security services as a former Soviet agent. The title comes from a speech in Hamlet: ‘When sorrows come, they come not single spies, but in battalions.’

The double bill was presented at the National Theatre in December 1988, and transferred to the Queen's Theatre in the West End in February 1989.

== An Englishman Abroad ==
The play is based on the true story of a chance meeting of the actress Coral Browne, with Guy Burgess, a member of the Cambridge spy ring, who worked for the Soviet Union while serving with MI6 and fled to exile in Moscow to avoid arrest in 1951. Browne was in Moscow in 1958 as a member of the Shakespeare Memorial Theatre Company playing Gertrude in Hamlet to Russian audiences. Her Hamlet, Michael Redgrave, had been at Cambridge with Burgess, who came to see him. Burgess also met Browne, who undertook to visit his London tailor on her return to order new suits for him. Bennett took this incident and dramatised it for television. Browne played her 25-years-younger self, and Alan Bates played Burgess. All the other characters, including Redgrave, were anonymised by Bennett.

The play was first broadcast on BBC Television on 29 November 1983 with the following cast:

- Guy Burgess – Alan Bates
- Coral – Coral Browne
- Claudius – Charles Gray
- Rosencrantz – Harold Innocent
- Guildenstern – Vernon Dobtcheff
- General – Czeslaw Grocholski
- Boy – Matthew Sim
- Hamlet – Mark Wing-Davey
- Hotel receptionist – Faina Zinova
- Toby – Douglas Reith
- Giles – Peter Chelsom
- Tessa – Judy Gridley
- Scarfman – Bibs Ekkel
- Tolya – Alexei Jawdokimov
- Mrs Burgess – Molly Veness
- Tailor – Denys Hawthorne
- Shoe shop assistant – Roger Hammond
- George – Charles Lamb
- Pyjama shop manager – Trevor Baxter

The film was directed by John Schlesinger

Source: BBC.

For the stage version Bennett substantially rewrote the script, cutting out many minor characters. At the National Theatre premiere on 1 December 1988 the cast was:

- Coral – Prunella Scales
- Burgess – Simon Callow
- Tolya – Paul Brightwell
- Tailor – Alan Bennett
- Shop Assistant – Edward Halsted

The play was directed by Bennett.

Source: Playscript.

== A Question of Attribution ==
The second play is based on Anthony Blunt's role in the Cambridge Spy Ring and, as Surveyor of the Queen's Pictures, personal art adviser to Queen Elizabeth II. Bennett portrays his continuing interrogation by Chubb, an MI5 officer; his work researching and restoring art; and an unexpected meeting with the Queen while he and an assistant are rehanging paintings at Buckingham Palace. The Queen, though ostensibly discussing aesthetic matters with him, interrogates Blunt more probingly than the MI5 man has done. The play was lightly revised for a television version first shown on 20 October 1991. The casts of the stage and screen versions were:

| | National Theatre, 1988 | BBC Television, 1991 |
|---|---|---|
| Blunt | Alan Bennett | James Fox |
| Restorer | David Terence | John Carter |
| Chubb | Simon Callow | David Calder |
| Phillips | Crispin Redman | Mark Payton |
| Colin | Brett Fancy | Jason Flemyng |
| The Queen ("HMQ" in the stage version) | Prunella Scales | Prunella Scales |

The stage play was directed by Simon Callow. The television version was directed by John Schlesinger.

The plays were adapted for radio in 2006, with Brigit Forsyth as Coral and Simon Callow as Burgess in the first play, and Edward Petherbridge as Blunt and Prunella Scales as the Queen in the second.

== Reception ==
In a televised documentary Caviar to the General broadcast on UK Channel 4 in 1990, shortly before her death, Coral Browne humorously described her reaction to seeing the stage version of An Englishman Abroad, particularly expressing her irritation at the costumes. She recalled that when she made the film version, the costume designer went to great lengths to find out what she wore at the time the story is set, but when she saw the stage costumes she exclaimed: "I fainted. The prospect of my appearing in a fake fur whatever it was, and hats that wouldn't have come out of a grab bag after Christmas at the Salvation Army... I was incensed... and I mean... and if the play ever comes to New York I shall go there with three lawyers... because I consider it a defamation."

== References and sources ==
=== Sources ===
- Bennett, Alan (1990). Single Spies: Two Plays about Guy Burgess and Anthony Blunt; Talking Heads: Six Monologues. New York and London: Summit. ISBN 978-0-671-69249-0.

== See also ==
- Cambridge Spies, a 2003 BBC TV play about the Cambridge Ring, and how Blunt came to be a Soviet agent.
