= Matthias Robinson =

Former department store chain

Matthias Robinson was a small chain of department stores in the north of England which were purchased by Debenhams.

== History ==
In 1875 Matthias Robinson opened a drapery shop on Lynn Street, Hartlepool. He quickly expanded the business by taking on the store next door, before buying the large building next to his store and calling it Lynn House.

On the advice of doctors, Matthias moved his family to Stockton on Tees due to his wife's health condition and in 1896, a new store was opened in Stockton-on-Tees as the first Robinsons department store. The two houses that were converted on Stockton High Street were destroyed by fire in December 1899, but a new store was completely rebuilt on the same site re-opening in May 1901. The new store had 48 departments, a restaurant and a cafe. The building was designed by Barnes & Coates of Sunderland with the assistance of W. Basil Scott and is an early example of steel frame construction in England.

By 1912, the Hartlepool business had grown further with premises opening on the opposite side of Lynn Street, which Matthias called The Coliseum and buildings on Whitby Street which he named Birmingham House. The business continued to grow and in 1914 opened a new department store in Briggate, Leeds. This store was later expanded in 1938 by purchasing neighbouring department store H & D Hart.

After the death of Matthias in 1929, his sons took over the running of the business with his son Cyril running the Stockton branch until he retired. The Stockton branch was then run by his grandson, Lionel, who was later responsible for negotiating the sale of the business to Debenhams. The Leeds store was run by another of Mathias's grandsons, Cecil. The business expanded in 1961 with the purchase of Bainbridge Barker, a quality department store in Darlington, which was renamed Matthias Robinson. The following year Debenhams purchased all four stores of Matthias Robinson for £2.8 million. The stores continued to operate under the Matthias Robinson or Robinsons name, with the Hartlepool store being closed and demolished in the late 1960s. In 1973, as part of a wider rationalisation and rebranding exercise, the Darlington store was closed and the Robinson name was dropped in favour of Debenhams at the two remaining stores which continue to trade.

On 26 April 2019, it was announced the Stockton branch would close in 2020 as one of 22 to be closed.
