= An Englishman Abroad =

1983 television film directed by John Schlesinger

- VHS cover art
- Written by: Alan Bennett
- Directed by: John Schlesinger
- Starring: Alan Bates; Coral Browne; Charles Gray
- Composer: George Fenton
- Country of origin: United Kingdom
- Original language: English

Production
- Producer: Innes Lloyd
- Cinematography: Nat Crosby
- Editor: Ken Pearce
- Running time: 60 min.
- Production company: BBC

Original release
- Network: BBC 1
- Release: 29 November 1983

An Englishman Abroad is a 1983 BBC television drama film based on the true story of a chance meeting of actress Coral Browne with Guy Burgess, a member of the Cambridge spy ring who spied for the Soviet Union while an officer at MI6. The production was written by Alan Bennett and directed by John Schlesinger. Browne stars as herself.

== Plot ==
The film is set in Moscow in 1958, after Burgess had defected to the Soviet Union in 1951 with Donald Maclean when it became apparent that Maclean was about to be investigated by British intelligence. Burgess barges into Browne's dressing room during the interval of a touring Shakespeare Memorial Theatre production of Hamlet, in which she portrayed Gertrude, and charms her. Later on she is invited to his Moscow flat, finding it with some difficulty, to measure him for a suit that he would like ordered from his London tailor. On returning to London, she visits several high-class gentlemen's outfitters to purchase his requirements.

== Film cast ==
- Alan Bates as Guy Burgess
- Coral Browne as herself
- Charles Gray as 'Charles' playing Claudius
- Harold Innocent as Rosencrantz
- Vernon Dobtcheff as Guildenstern
- Czeslaw Grocholski as general
- Matthew Sim as boy
- Mark Wing-Davey as Hamlet
- Faina Zinova as hotel receptionist
- Douglas Reith as Toby
- Peter Chelsom as Giles
- Judy Gridley as Tessa
- Bibs Ekkel as scarf man
- Alexei Jawdokimov as Tolya
- Molly Veness as Mrs Burgess
- Denys Hawthorne as tailor
- Roger Hammond as shoe shop assistant
- Charles Lamb as George
- Trevor Baxter as pyjama shop manager

Charles Gray's character was simply named 'Charles' but in the real events on which the play is based, his character would have been the actor Mark Dignam. During the film, Burgess refers to one of the actors in the version of 'Hamlet' he's just seen, playing the part of Laertes. "I like the look of Laertes. He goes rather well in to tights" says Burgess. "That's what he thinks" replies Browne, to which Burgess responds: "Looks like he put a couple of King Edward's down there". The actor they were discussing would have been Edward Woodward in the Moscow production. Michael Redgrave, Dorothy Tutin, Julian Glover, Anthony Nicholls, Eileen Atkins, Ian Holm and Edward de Souza were all members of the Shakespearean troupe involved with this tour of Russia, but they play no part in Bennett's storyline.

== Production ==
Rather than film in the Soviet Union, Schlesinger used several locations in Scotland. The Caird Hall and Whitehall Theatre in Dundee stood in for the Moscow theatre, and the grand marble staircase of Glasgow City Chambers played the part of the British Embassy. Additional filming was done at Glasgow's St. Andrew's Suspension Bridge ("luckily, in a snowstorm" Bennett later wrote) and the Moss Heights flats in Cardonald, which represented Burgess' Moscow apartment.

=== Writing ===
Several plot changes were made from the true story told by Browne to Bennett. Burgess in fact threw up in the dressing room of Michael Redgrave, who asked for Browne's help. Redgrave documented the incident in his autobiography without mentioning Browne's involvement with the incident. Browne addressed some press speculation that she had in fact plagiarized Redgrave's story in various interviews to promote the film's first broadcast, explaining Bennett's dramatic changes. The play also contained scenes in Moscow's British Embassy and in London shops where Browne encountered resistance to helping Burgess, none of which happened in reality.

Bennett gives the date of Browne's meeting with Burgess as 1958 in the introduction to his Single Spies, which contains the text of An Englishman Abroad in the stage play version and the text of A Question of Attribution about Anthony Blunt.

The play was also adapted for radio on the BBC World Service in 1994 starring Michael Gambon as Burgess and Penelope Wilton as Coral Browne. It was subsequently re-broadcast on BBC Radio 7 and BBC Radio 4 Extra, most recently in 2013 as part of BBC Radio 4 Extra's Cambridge Spies season.

== Reception ==
The film was shown at the 1983 London Film Festival on 21 November 1983.

Both Browne and Bates were winners of the BAFTA awards for acting for their roles in the production. The film won the British Academy Television Award for Best Single Drama.

On the BFI TV 100, a list compiled in 2000 by the British Film Institute (BFI), chosen by a poll of industry professionals, to determine what were the greatest British television programmes of any genre ever to have been screened, An Englishman Abroad was listed at number 30.

The U.S. film critic Pauline Kael wrote in 1985 that An Englishman Abroad "is probably the finest hour of television I've ever seen."

== See also ==
- Cambridge Spies, a 2003 BBC TV play about the Cambridge Ring
