= The Madness of King George =

1994 British film by Nicholas Hytner

- Theatrical release poster
- Directed by: Nicholas Hytner
- Screenplay by: Alan Bennett
- Based on: The Madness of George III; 1991 play by Alan Bennett
- Produced by: Stephen Evans; David Parfitt
- Starring: Nigel Hawthorne; Helen Mirren; Ian Holm; Amanda Donohoe; Rupert Graves; Rupert Everett
- Cinematography: Andrew Dunn
- Edited by: Tariq Anwar
- Music by: George Fenton; George Frideric Handel
- Production companies: Channel Four Films; Close Call Films
- Distributed by: Channel Four Films; The Samuel Goldwyn Company (through Rank Film Distributors)
- Release dates: 28 December 1994 (United States); 24 March 1995 (United Kingdom)
- Running time: 110 minutes
- Country: United Kingdom
- Language: English
- Box office: $27.4 million

The Madness of King George is a 1994 British biographical comedy drama film directed by Nicholas Hytner and adapted by Alan Bennett from his own 1991 play The Madness of George III. It tells the true story of George III of Great Britain's deteriorating mental health, and his equally declining relationship with his eldest son, George Prince of Wales, particularly focusing on the period around the Regency Crisis of 1788–89. Two text panels at the end of the film note that the colour of the King's urine suggests that he was suffering from porphyria, adding that the disease is "periodic, unpredictable and hereditary."

The Madness of King George won the BAFTA Awards in 1995 for Outstanding British Film and Best Actor in a Leading Role for Nigel Hawthorne, who was also nominated for the Academy Award for Best Actor. The film won the Oscar for Best Art Direction and was also nominated for Oscars for Best Supporting Actress for Mirren and Best Adapted Screenplay. Helen Mirren also won the Cannes Film Festival Award for Best Actress and Hytner was nominated for the Palme d'Or.

In 1999, the British Film Institute voted The Madness of King George the 42nd-greatest British film of all time.

== Plot ==
King George III's bout of madness in 1788 touched off the Regency Crisis and triggered a power struggle between factions of Parliament under the Tory Prime Minister William Pitt the Younger and the reform-minded Leader of the Opposition Charles James Fox.

At first, the King's behaviour appears mildly eccentric. He is deeply concerned with the wellbeing and productivity of Great Britain and exhibits an encyclopaedic knowledge of the families of even the most obscure royal appointments. He is devoted to his loving wife, Queen Charlotte, and their large brood of 15 children. However, he is growing more unsettled, partly over the loss of America. His memory fails, his behaviour becomes erratic and hypersexual, he talks and talks, and his urine turns blue.

George, Prince of Wales, aggravates the situation, knowing that he will be named regent if the King becomes incapacitated. Prince George chafes under his father's relentless criticism, and yearns for greater freedom, particularly when it comes to choosing a wife. He married the woman everyone believes to be his mistress, Maria Fitzherbert, in a secret ceremony in 1785. Without his father's consent, the marriage is illegal. Even with consent, it would remove him from the succession, because Maria is a Catholic. He knows that he has the moral support of Fox, whose agenda includes abolition of the slave trade and friendlier relations with America. Knowing how to exacerbate the King's behaviour, the Prince arranges a concert of music by Handel. The King reacts as expected, interrupting the musicians, speaking lasciviously to Lady Pembroke, and finally assaulting his son.

In a private moment, the King tells Charlotte that he knows something is wrong. They are brutally interrupted when the Prince has them separated, supposedly on the advice of physicians. Led by the Prince of Wales's personal physician, Dr. Warren, the King is treated using the medical practices of the time, which focus on the state of his urine and bowel movements and include painful cupping and purgatives.

Lady Pembroke recommends Dr. Francis Willis, who cured her mother-in-law. Willis uses novel procedures. At his farm in Lincolnshire, patients work to gain "a better opinion of themselves". He observes to an equerry: "To be curbed, thwarted, stood up to, exercises the character." When the King insults him, foully, he is strapped into a chair and gagged. He will be restrained whenever he "swears and indulges in meaningless discourse" and "does not strive every day and always towards his own recovery".

When the Prince has the King transferred to Kew, Charlotte watches as her beloved, bearded and wearing a soiled diaper and a straitjacket, struggles against being put in the coach. "Until you can govern yourself, you're not fit to govern others. And until you do so, I shall govern you", Willis says. At Kew, the King spits soup at Willis, but gains control under the physician's intractable gaze. (Note: According to the film, it was unheard of for anyone to look directly at the King without his permission.) Later, the King, properly dressed, feeds himself to a round of applause from staff — but the delusions persist.

The Whig opposition confronts Pitt's increasingly unpopular Tory government with a proposal that would give the Prince powers of regency. Baron Thurlow, the Lord Chancellor, obtains and suppresses proof of the marriage. Fox wins, and the Regency Bill is printed. Thurlow comes to see the King and joins in a moving reading of King Lear. "I have remembered how to seem..." the King muses. "What, what!" an expression he has not used in six months. His urine is yellow.

Thurlow and the King arrive at Parliament in time to thwart the bill. The King forces the Prince to put away Maria Fitzherbert. With the crisis averted, all those who have witnessed his suffering are summarily dismissed, including Captain Greville, the King's equerry. Fitzroy, another equerry, observes to the sacked Greville: "To be kind does not commend you to kings."

Cheering crowds welcome the royal family to St. Paul's Cathedral. Willis stands by, but the King dismisses him.

The King declares: "We must be a model family" and tells Prince George, who wants "something to do": "Smile at the people, wave at them. Let them see that we're happy. That's why we're here." Saluting, Willis disappears into the crowd, where Mrs. Fitzherbert also smiles, wistfully.

== Cast ==
- Nigel Hawthorne as King George III
- Helen Mirren as Queen Charlotte
- Ian Holm as Francis Willis
- Amanda Donohoe as Lady Pembroke, Lady of the Bedchamber
- Rupert Graves as Captain Greville
- Geoffrey Palmer as Doctor Warren
- Rupert Everett as George, Prince of Wales
- Jim Carter as Charles James Fox, Leader of the Opposition
- Julian Rhind-Tutt as Frederick, Duke of York
- Julian Wadham as William Pitt the Younger, Prime Minister
- Anthony Calf as Lord Charles FitzRoy
- Adrian Scarborough as Fortnum
- Matthew Lloyd Davies as Papendiek
- John Wood as Lord Chancellor Lord Thurlow
- Jeremy Child as Black Rod
- Struan Rodger as Henry Dundas
- Barry Stanton as Sheridan
- Janine Duvitski as Margaret Nicholson
- Caroline Harker as Mrs. Fitzherbert
- Roger Hammond as Baker
- Cyril Shaps as Pepys
- Selina Cadell as Mrs. Cordwell
- Alan Bennett as a backbench MP
- Nicholas Selby as Speaker

== Production ==
Alan Bennett insisted that director Nicholas Hytner and actor Nigel Hawthorne should be cast in the film version, after having acted in the play.

=== Title change ===
In adapting the play to film, the director Nicholas Hytner changed the name from The Madness of George III to The Madness of King George for American audiences, to clarify George III's royalty. A popular explanation developed that the change was made because there was a worry that American audiences would think it was a sequel and not go to see it, assuming they had missed "I" and "II". An interview revealed: "That's not totally untrue," said Hytner, laughing. "But there was also the factor that it was felt necessary to get the word King into the title."

=== Filming locations ===
Principal photography took place from 11 July to 9 September 1994. The film was shot at Shepperton Studios and on location at:

- Arundel Castle, Arundel, West Sussex, including Hiorne's Tower
- Divinity School, Oxford
- Broughton Castle, Banbury, Oxfordshire
- Eton College, Eton, Berkshire
- Royal Naval College, Greenwich
- St Paul's Cathedral, London, including the Geometric staircase
- Syon House, Brentford, Middlesex
- Thame Park, Oxfordshire
- Wilton House, Wilton, Wiltshire, including the Double Cube Room

== Reception ==
=== Box office ===
The Madness of King George was the second highest-grossing British film of the year, behind Shallow Grave, with a gross of £4.6 million in the UK. It debuted strongly at the US box office and went on to gross $15,238,689 in the United States and Canada and $27.4 million worldwide.

=== Critical response ===
The film received largely positive reviews. On Rotten Tomatoes, the film has a 94% score based on 47 reviews, with an average of 7.8/10. The site's consensus states: "Thanks largely to stellar all-around performances from a talented cast, The Madness of King George is a funny, entertaining, and immensely likable adaptation of the eponymous stage production."

Reviewing for Variety, Emanuel Levy praised the film, writing: "Under Hytner's guidance, the cast, composed of some of the best actors in British cinema, rises to the occasion... Boasting a rich period look, almost every shot is filled with handsome, emotionally charged composition".

John Simon of The National Review wrote, "The Madness of King George III has survived the transfer from stage to screen, and emerges equally enjoyable on film." Simon praised the leading actors and most of the supporting cast, except for Carter's portrayal of Fox, which he said lacked charisma.

Stanley Kauffmann of The New Republic wrote, "For those who, like myself, were disappointed in the play, the film contains pleasant surprises, all of them resulting from differences between the two arts."

== Year-end lists ==
- 2nd – Peter Rainer, Los Angeles Times
- 8th – National Board of Review
- 10th – Kenneth Turan, Los Angeles Times
- Top 10 runner-ups (not ranked) – Janet Maslin, The New York Times
- Best of the year (not ranked) - Michael Medved, Sneak Previews

== Accolades ==
Award	Category	Nominee(s)	Result	Ref.
Academy Awards	Best Actor	Nigel Hawthorne	Nominated	
Academy Awards	Best Supporting Actress	Helen Mirren	Nominated	
Academy Awards	Best Screenplay – Based on Material Previously Produced or Published	Alan Bennett	Nominated	
Academy Awards	Best Art Direction	Art Direction: Ken Adam; Set Decoration: Carolyn Scott	Won	
British Academy Film Awards	Best Film	Stephen Evans, David Parfitt, and Nicholas Hytner	Nominated	
British Academy Film Awards	Outstanding British Film	Stephen Evans, David Parfitt, and Nicholas Hytner	Won	
British Academy Film Awards	Best Direction	Nicholas Hytner	Nominated	
British Academy Film Awards	Best Actor in a Leading Role	Nigel Hawthorne	Won	
British Academy Film Awards	Best Actress in a Leading Role	Helen Mirren	Nominated	
British Academy Film Awards	Best Actor in a Supporting Role	Ian Holm	Nominated	
British Academy Film Awards	Best Adapted Screenplay	Alan Bennett	Nominated	
British Academy Film Awards	Best Cinematography	Andrew Dunn	Nominated	
British Academy Film Awards	Best Costume Design	Mark Thompson	Nominated	
British Academy Film Awards	Best Editing	Tariq Anwar	Nominated	
British Academy Film Awards	Best Make-Up and Hair	Lisa Westcott	Won	
British Academy Film Awards	Best Original Music	George Fenton	Nominated	
British Academy Film Awards	Best Production Design	Ken Adam	Nominated	
British Academy Film Awards	Best Sound	Christopher Ackland, David Crozier, and Robin O'Donoghue	Nominated	
British Society of Cinematographers Awards	Best Cinematography in a Theatrical Feature Film	Andrew Dunn	Won	
Cannes Film Festival	Palme d'Or	Nicholas Hytner	Nominated	
Cannes Film Festival	Best Actress	Helen Mirren	Won	
Empire Awards	Best Actor	Nigel Hawthorne	Won	
Evening Standard British Film Awards	Best Film	Nicholas Hytner	Won	
Evening Standard British Film Awards	Best Screenplay	Alan Bennett	Won	
Evening Standard British Film Awards	Best Technical and Artistic Achievement	Andrew Dunn	Won	
Goya Awards	Best European Film	Nicholas Hytner	Nominated	
London Film Critics Circle Awards	British Film of the Year		Won	
London Film Critics Circle Awards	British Actor of the Year	Nigel Hawthorne	Won	
London Film Critics Circle Awards	British Actress of the Year	Helen Mirren	Nominated	
London Film Critics Circle Awards	British Screenwriter of the Year	Alan Bennett	Won	
London Film Critics Circle Awards	British Technical Achievement of the Year	Ken Adam	Won	
National Board of Review Awards	Top Ten Films		8th Place	
Writers Guild of America Awards	Best Screenplay – Based on Material Previously Produced or Published	Alan Bennett	Nominated	
Writers' Guild of Great Britain Awards	Best Screenplay	Alan Bennett	Won	

== See also ==
- BFI Top 100 British films
