= Talking Heads (play) =

Play written by Alan Bennett

- Original language: English
- Written by: Alan Bennett

Premiere
- Date: The Chichester Festival Theatre, UK, 1991 New Version : Minetta Lane Theatre, NY, April 6, 2003

Talking Heads is a stage adaptation of the BBC series of the same title created by Alan Bennett. It consists of six monologues presented in alternating programmes of three each.

== Programme A ==
The Hand of God

Antiques dealer Celia cultivates friendships with her aging neighbours in the hope she will be able to get a good deal on their treasures when they die. She is particularly pleased to sell an odd sketch of a finger for £100, only to discover it was a lost Michelangelo masterpiece, a study of the central image of the hand of God on the ceiling of the Sistine Chapel worth millions.

A Lady of Letters

In an effort to remedy the social ills surrounding her, Irene Ruddock compulsively writes letters of protests and complaints to everyone she can, including her MP, the police, and her local chemist.

Bed Among the Lentils

Susan, the alcoholic wife of a vainly insensitive vicar, distracts herself from her marriage by conducting an affair with grocer Ramesh Ramesh.

== Programme B ==
Her Big Chance

After appearing in a series of small, unimportant roles, aspiring actress Lesley is thrilled to be cast by a West German filmmaker, until she discovers she will be appearing in soft pornography.

A Chip in the Sugar

Graham, a closeted middle-aged man with a history of mild mental health problems, finds his life upended when his ageing widowed mother, on whom he dotes, is reunited with an old flame who is his exact opposite. When he unearths a secret about the man's past, he triumphantly confronts his mother with the information and restores the status quo and his comfortable life but destroys her chance of happiness in the process.

Miss Fozzard Finds Her Feet

A lonely, middle-aged department store clerk finds her life consumed with a burgeoning relationship with her new podiatrist, a decidedly kinky fellow whose all-consuming foot fetish prompts him to pay her to model a variety of shoes while also indulging in other activities.

== Productions ==
Various incarnations of the original BBC television series found their way to the stage, including adaptations produced for the Chichester Festival Theatre in 1991, London's West End in 1992 and 1998, St. Martin's in Lancaster in 1994 and at the Tiffany Theater in Los Angeles in 2002.

The original 1991-92 stage production comprised "A Woman of No Importance", "A Chip in the Sugar" and "A Lady of Letters", with Alan Bennett and Patricia Routledge reprising their TV roles.

Staged by Michael Engler, the off-Broadway production opened at the Minetta Lane Theatre in Greenwich Village on April 6, 2003 and ran until September 7. The opening night casts included Brenda Wehle as Celia, Christine Ebersole as Irene, Kathleen Chalfant as Susan, Valerie Mahaffey as Leslie, Daniel Davis as Graham, and Lynn Redgrave as Miss Fozzard.

== Critical reception ==
In his review in The New York Times, Ben Brantley noted the play "is not an unqualified success. Presented in two programs of three monologues apiece, Talking Heads provides two perfectly pleasant evenings of civilized entertainment. But . . . it's impossible not to feel that something precious has been lost in the trans-Atlantic translation. This is largely because no one does repression – and its first cousin, denial – like the English . . . the Talking Heads monologues are quiet, exquisitely modulated and veddy, veddy English exercises in dramatic irony. Raise the speakers' voices, literally or figuratively, and you risk turning them from sly character studies into comic gargoyles . . . Though each of the monologues holds your attention, it often seem as if the characters are being impersonated instead of incarnated. This means that while the jokes almost always go over, they can feel like cartoon captions instead of involuntary hiccups of personality. Then, of course, there's the matter of making speeches stageworthy that were devised for the confessional privacy of a television camera."

In their reviews for CurtainUp, Jerry Weinstein observed, "While there's nothing to prevent a contemporary staging of these plays, they have a decidedly 1950s postwar frisson," and Les Gutman called it "a very polished and satisfying evening of theater" and added, "There's more than a little irony in the snideness with which Bennett relates these stories. One can only wonder if, like many of his subjects, he's oblivious to it."

== Awards and nominations ==
Talking Heads won the Laurence Olivier Award for Best Entertainment in 1992, with Bennett also winning the award for Best Actor in a Musical or Entertainment.

Alan Bennett won the New York Drama Critics' Circle Award for Best Foreign Play and was nominated for the Drama Desk Award for Outstanding Play and the Outer Critics Circle Award for Outstanding Off-Broadway Play. The entire cast won the Obie Award for Outstanding Performance, and Lynn Redgrave won the Drama Desk Award for Outstanding Featured Actress in a Play.
