= The Madness of George III =

1991 play by Alan Bennett

Poster for National Theatre production on tour

The Madness of George III is a 1991 play by Alan Bennett. It is a fictionalised biographical study of the latter half of the reign of King George III of Great Britain, his battle with mental illness, and the inability of his court to handle his condition. It was adapted for film in 1994 as The Madness of King George.

== Performance history ==
The play had its premiere on 28 November 1991 at the Lyttelton Theatre of the National Theatre in London. It was directed by Nicholas Hytner and designed by Mark Thompson. The play starred Nigel Hawthorne as King George III, Janet Dale as Queen Charlotte and Michael Fitzgerald as the Prince of Wales, also starring Julian Wadham, Charles Kay, Adrian Scarborough, Mark Lockyer and David Henry.

After its London run, the production toured the UK and the United States, returned to the National Theatre in 1993 and was then presented in Athens and Israel in 1994. Hawthorne repeated the role in the 1994 film, and was nominated for the Academy Award for Best Actor.

The play was staged at the Lowell Davies Festival Theatre in San Diego, California, from June 19 to September 24, 2010.

On 18 January 2012, the play was revived at the Apollo Theatre. David Haig played George III.

A further revival took place in November 2018, at Nottingham Playhouse, with Mark Gatiss as the lead. This production was streamed on the National Theatre's YouTube channel in June 2020 as part of the NT at Home season.

== Cast ==
=== Original Cast (National Theatre, 1991) ===
- Nigel Hawthorne as King George III
- Janet Dale as Queen Charlotte
- Michael Fitzgerald as the Prince of Wales
- Julian Wadham as William Pitt
- Anthony Calf as Captain Fitzroy
- Daniel Flynn as Captain Greville
- Charles Kay as Dr. Willis
- David Henry as Charles Fox
- Matthew Lloyd Davies as Papendiek
- Brian Shelley as Fortnum
- Paul Kynman as Ramsden Skrimshire

=== Second London Run (Apollo Theatre, 2012) ===
- David Haig as George III
- Beatie Edney as Queen Charlotte
- Christopher Keegan as the Prince of Wales
- William Belchambers as the Duke of York
- Charlotte Asprey as Lady Pembroke
- Ed Cooper Clarke as Captain Fitzroy
- Orlando James as Captain Greville
- Beruce Khan as Papandiek
- Ryan Saunders as Fortnum
- Peter McGovern as Braun
- Simon Markey as Prince's Footman
- Gary Mackay as Prince's Valet
- Nicholas Rowe as William Pitt
- Thomas Wheatley as Lord Thurlow
- Richard Hansell as Dundas
- Gary Oliver as Charles Fox
- Patrick Moy as Sheridan
- Peter Pacey as Sir George Baker
- Madhav Sharma as Dr Richard Warren
- John Webb as Sir Lucas Pepys
- Clive Francis as Dr. Willis
- Karen Winchester as Margaret Nicholson
- Chris McCalphy as Willis' Henchman
- Haseeb Malik as Warren's assistant

=== Nottingham Playhouse Run (2018) ===
- Mark Gatiss as George III
- Adrian Scarborough as Dr Willis
- Debra Gillett as Queen Charlotte
- Nadia Albina as Fitzroy
- Nicholas Bishop as William Pitt
- Amanda Hadingue as Fox/Dr Pepys
- Jack Holden as Greville
- David Hounslow as Thurlow
- Stephanie Jacob as Dr Baker/Sheridan
- Louise Jameson as Dr Warren
- Andrew Joshi as Dundas
- Adam Karim as Fortnum
- Harry Kershaw as Duke of York
- Billy Postlethwaite as Braun
- Sara Powell as Lady Pembroke
- Wilf Scolding as Prince of Wales
- Jessica Temple as Papandiek

== Reviews ==
The play has been viewed as a character study for the actor who plays George III and most reviewers attribute its success to compelling performances from the two actors, Hawthorne and Haig, who played the king. Frank Rich of The New York Times singled out Nigel Hawthorne's performance in the US tour, calling it "astonishing" and "unforgettable", but he labelled the play itself as not "one of Bennett's major works" and as being more "marketable to Broadway and the colonies". Writing about the 2012 revival, Lyn Gardner said that Luscombe's production reminds us that "Bennett is not writing a royal Downton Abbey, but a play exploring appearance and reality", and that the play brings out the fact that amidst all the royal pomp the king is merely a man like everybody else. In The Telegraph, Charles Spencer praised Haig's performance, comparing it favorably to Hawthorne's performance twenty years earlier, saying "it seemed an impossible act to follow, but David Haig proves every inch Hawthorne’s equal in a performance of extraordinary emotion, tenderness and humour".

Writing on the 2018 Nottingham Playhouse run, Kate Maltby, writing for The Guardian notes that "Scarborough and Gatiss are electric", praising Gillett for her "endearing" portrayal of Queen Charlotte. She adds that "Gatiss delivers a tour de force" in this "viscerally repulsive depiction of the gap between public and private life." despite his descent into a "slobbering wreck" as George III. Maltby notes overall that this production is a "technically excellent production of a modern classic." giving it a 4 out of 5 rating.
