= Alan Bennett =

English writer and actor (born 1934)

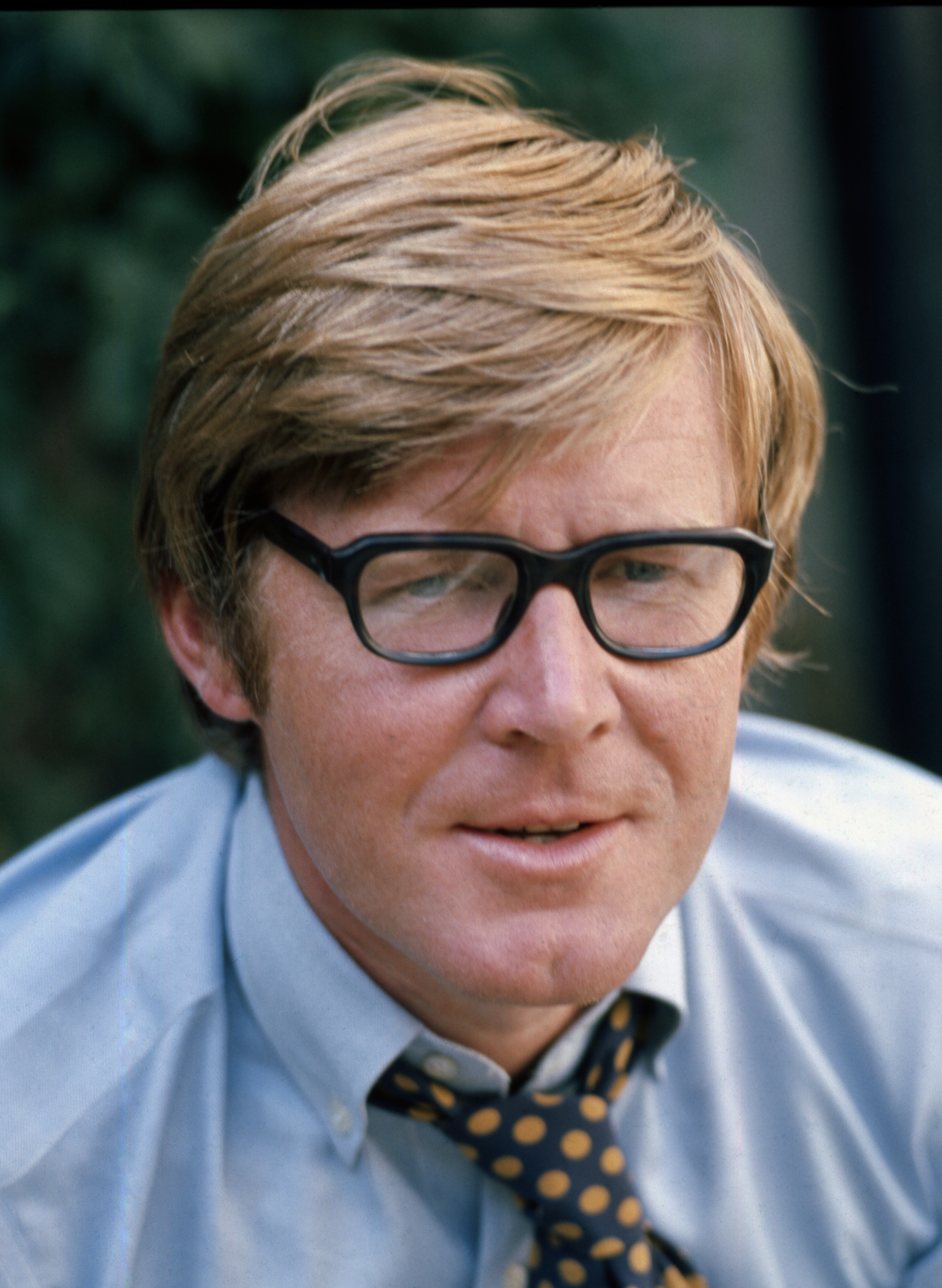
- Bennett in 1973
- Born: 9 May 1934 (age 92); Armley, West Yorkshire, England
- Education: Exeter College, Oxford
- Occupations: Playwright; author; screenwriter; actor
- Years active: 1960–present
- Partner: Rupert Thomas

Alan Bennett (born 9 May 1934) is an English author, playwright, screenwriter, and actor. He has received numerous awards and honours including four BAFTA Awards, four Laurence Olivier Awards, and two Tony Awards. In 2005, he received the Society of London Theatre Special Award.

Bennett was born in Leeds and attended the University of Oxford, where he taught medieval history for several years. His work in the satirical revue Beyond the Fringe at the 1960 Edinburgh Festival brought him instant fame and later a Special Tony Award. He turned to writing full time and gained acclaim with his plays at the Royal National Theatre. The following plays were adapted into films: The Madness of King George (1994), The History Boys (2006), and The Lady in the Van (2015).

== Early life ==
Bennett was born on 9 May 1934 in Armley, Leeds, West Riding of Yorkshire. The younger son of a Co-op butcher, Walter, and his wife, Lilian Mary (née Peel), Bennett attended Christ Church, Upper Armley, Church of England School (in the same class as Barbara Taylor Bradford), and then Leeds Modern School (now Lawnswood School). He has an older brother, Gordon, who is exactly three years older than him. Gordon is a retired airline pilot.

Bennett learned Russian at the Joint Services School for Linguists (JSSL) during his national service before applying for a scholarship at Oxford University. He was accepted by Exeter College, Oxford, and graduated with a first-class degree in history. While at Oxford, he performed comedy with a number of eventually successful actors in The Oxford Revue. He remained at the university for several years, working as a junior lecturer of Medieval History at Magdalen College, before deciding in 1960 that he was not suited to being an academic.

== Career ==
=== Early career ===
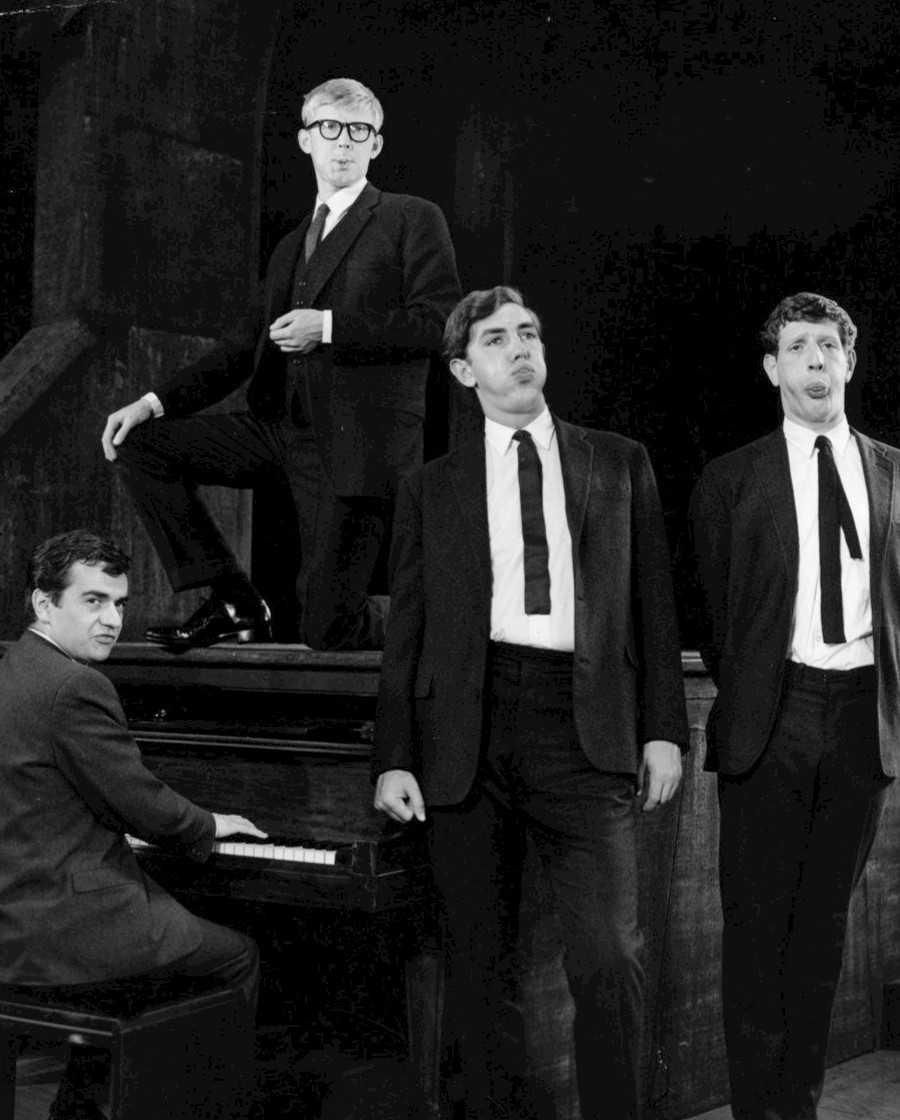
Bennett (second left, on top of the piano) in Beyond the Fringe on Broadway c. 1962. Also pictured are (left to right): Dudley Moore (seated at the piano), Peter Cook and Jonathan Miller.

In August 1960, Bennett – along with Dudley Moore, Jonathan Miller and Peter Cook – gained fame after an appearance at the Edinburgh Festival in the satirical revue Beyond the Fringe, with the show continuing in London and New York. He also appeared in My Father Knew Lloyd George. His television comedy sketch series On the Margin (1966) was erased; the BBC re-used expensive videotape rather than keep it in the archives. However, in 2014 it was announced that audio copies of the entire series had been found.

Bennett's first stage play, Forty Years On, directed by Patrick Garland and starring John Gielgud, was produced in 1968. His second play, Getting On, also directed by Garland and starring Kenneth More, opened in 1971. This was followed by Habeas Corpus in 1973 and The Old Country in 1977, both starring Alec Guinness. Many television and radio plays followed, with screenplays, short stories, novellas, a large body of non-fictional prose, and broadcasting and many appearances as an actor.

Despite a long history with both the National Theatre and the BBC, Bennett never writes on commission, saying "I don't work on commission, I just do it on spec. If people don't want it then it's too bad."

Bennett's works for television include his first play for the medium, A Day Out in 1972, A Little Outing in 1977, Intensive Care in 1982, An Englishman Abroad in 1983, and A Question of Attribution in 1991. In 1988 Talking Heads, a series of monologues for television, was broadcast. They were later performed at the Comedy Theatre in London in 1992. A second set of six Talking Heads followed a decade later.

=== 1980s ===
Bennett wrote the play Enjoy in 1980. It barely scraped a run of seven weeks at the Vaudeville Theatre, in spite of the stellar cast of Joan Plowright, Colin Blakely, Susan Littler, Philip Sayer, Liz Smith (who replaced Joan Hickson during rehearsals) and, in his first West End role, Marc Sinden. It was directed by Ronald Eyre. A new production of Enjoy attracted very favourable notices during its 2008 UK tour and moved to the West End of London in January 2009. The West End show took more than £1 million in advance ticket sales and even extended the run to cope with demand. The production starred Alison Steadman, David Troughton, Richard Glaves, Carol Macready and Josie Walker.

=== 1990s ===
Bennett wrote The Lady in the Van based on his experiences with an eccentric woman called Miss Shepherd, who lived on Bennett's driveway in a series of dilapidated vans for more than fifteen years. It was first published in 1989 as an essay in the London Review of Books. In 1990 he published it in book form. In 1999, he adapted it into a stage play, which starred Maggie Smith and was directed by Nicholas Hytner. The stage play includes two characters named Alan Bennett. On 21 February 2009 it was broadcast as a radio play on BBC Radio 4, with Maggie Smith reprising her role and Alan Bennett playing himself. He adapted the story again for a 2015 film, with Maggie Smith reprising her role again, and Nicholas Hytner directing again. In the film Alex Jennings plays the two versions of Bennett, although Alan Bennett appears in a cameo at the very end of the film.

Bennett adapted his 1991 play The Madness of George III for the cinema. Entitled The Madness of King George (1994), the film received four Academy Award nominations: for Bennett's writing and the performances of Nigel Hawthorne and Helen Mirren. It won the award for best art direction.

In 1995, Bennett wrote and hosted the three-part BBC documentary series The Abbey, directed by Jonathan Stedall. The programme provides a personal tribute to, and tour of, Westminster Abbey.

=== 21st century ===
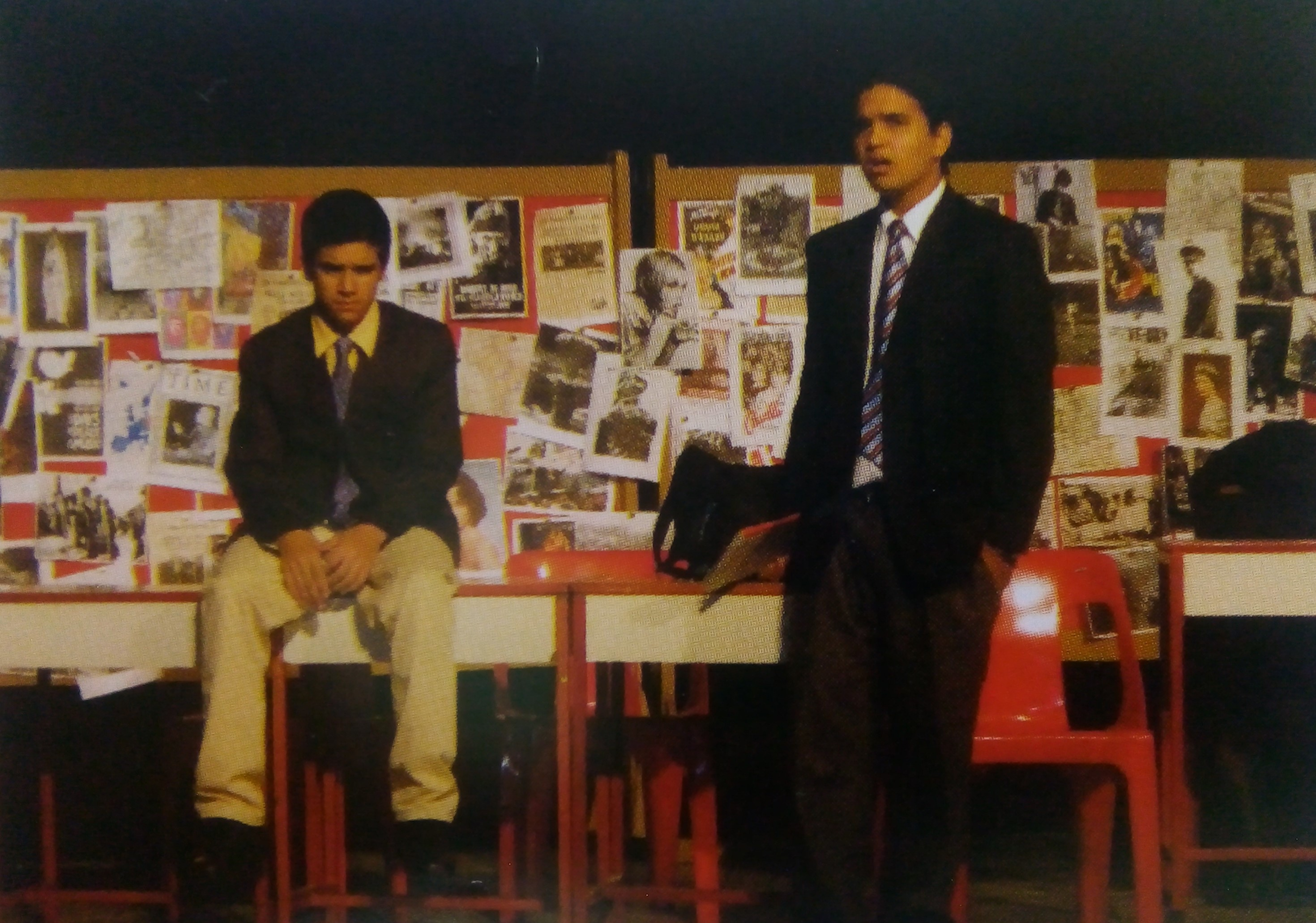
A 2007 production of Bennett's The History Boys at The Doon School, India.

Bennett's The History Boys won three Laurence Olivier Awards in 2005, for Best New Play, Best Actor (Richard Griffiths), and Best Direction (Nicholas Hytner), having previously won Critics' Circle Theatre Awards and Evening Standard Awards for Best Actor and Best Play. Bennett also received the Laurence Olivier Award for Outstanding Contribution to British Theatre. The History Boys won six Tony Awards on Broadway, including best play, best performance by a leading actor in a play (Richard Griffiths), best performance by a featured actress in a play (Frances de la Tour) and best direction of a play (Nicholas Hytner). A film version of The History Boys was released in the UK in October 2006.

In 2005, Bennett released his second volume of autobiographical prose Untold Stories, which actor Simon Callow described as "magisterial", saying it offered a "comprehensive insight into a figure who... has become a defining feature of the national landscape".

At the National Theatre in late 2009 Nicholas Hytner directed Bennett's play The Habit of Art, about the relationship between the poet W. H. Auden and the composer Benjamin Britten.

Bennett's play People opened at the National Theatre in October 2012. In December that year, Cocktail Sticks, an autobiographical play by Bennett, premièred at the National Theatre as part of a double bill with the monologue Hymn. The production was directed by Bennett's long-term collaborator Nicholas Hytner. It was well-received, and transferred to the Duchess Theatre in the West End of London, being subsequently adapted for radio broadcast by BBC Radio 4.

In July 2018, Allelujah!, a comic drama by Bennett about a National Health Service hospital threatened with closure, opened at London's Bridge Theatre to critical acclaim.

== Personal life ==
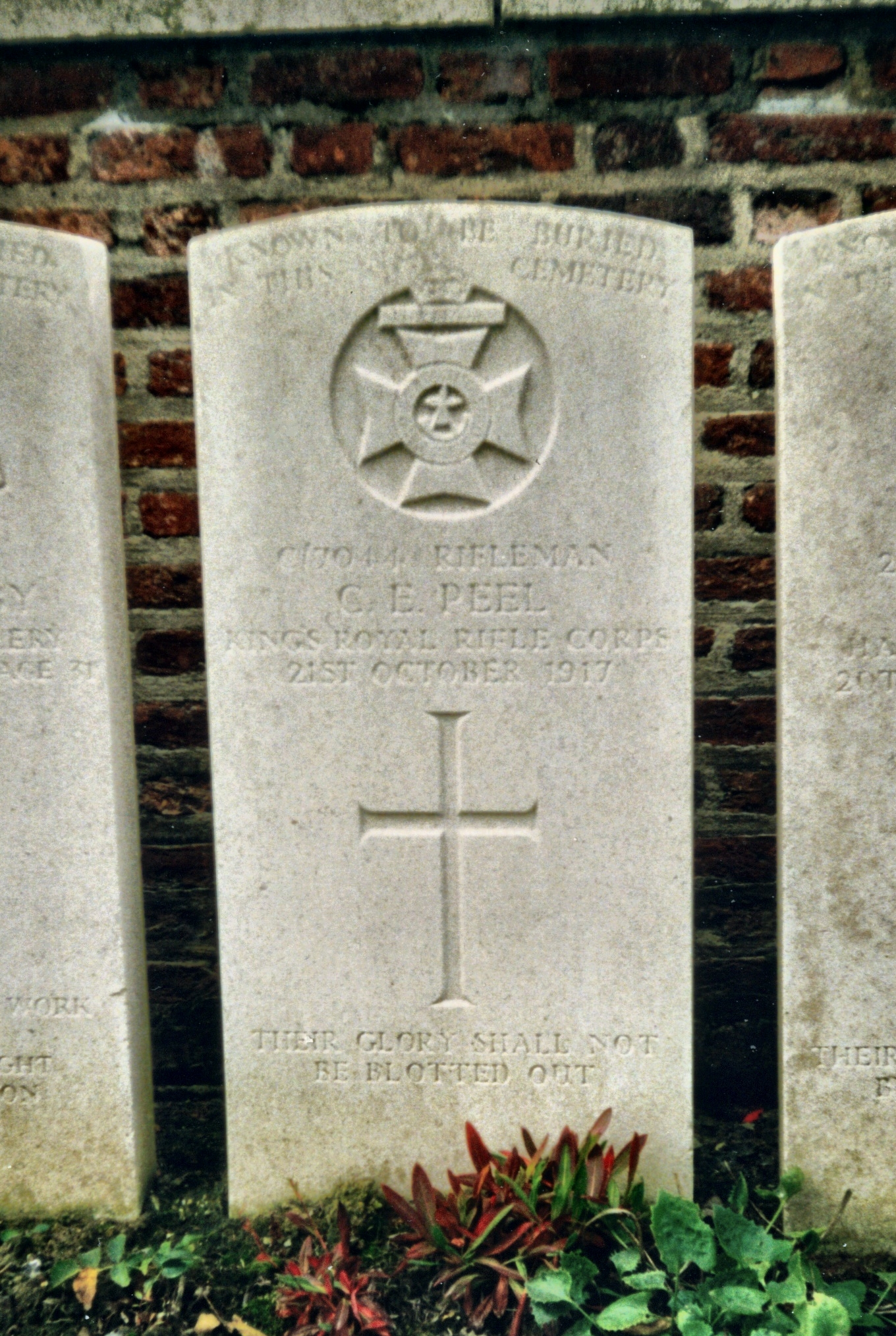
The headstone, in Larch Wood (Railway Cutting) Cemetery, of Alan Bennett's Uncle Clarence, subject of a 1985 radio monologue

Bennett lived for 40 years on Gloucester Crescent in Camden Town, London, and in 2006 moved a few minutes' walk away to Primrose Hill with his partner Rupert Thomas, the former editor of The World of Interiors magazine. Bennett also had a long-term relationship with his former housekeeper, Anne Davies, until her death in 2009.

Bennett is an agnostic. He was raised Anglican and gradually "left it [the church] over the years".

Bennett declined the award of Commander of the Order of the British Empire (CBE) in 1988 and declined a knighthood in 1996.

In September 2005, Bennett revealed that, in 1997, he had undergone treatment for colorectal cancer and described the illness as a "bore". His chances of survival were given as being "much less" than 50 per cent and surgeons had told him they removed a "rock-bun" sized tumour. He began Untold Stories (published 2005) thinking it would be published posthumously, but his cancer went into remission.

In the autobiographical sketches which form a large part of the book, Bennett says of himself "I am homosexual", but also mentions "flings" with women. Previously Bennett had referred to questions about his sexuality as like asking a man who has just crawled across the Sahara desert to choose between Perrier or Malvern mineral water.

=== Charity work ===
In October 2008, Bennett announced that he was donating his entire archive of working papers, unpublished manuscripts, diaries and books to the Bodleian Library, stating that it was a gesture of thanks repaying a debt he felt he owed to the British welfare state that had given him educational opportunities which his humble family background would otherwise never have afforded.

In September 2015, Bennett endorsed Jeremy Corbyn's campaign in the Labour Party leadership election. The following month, after Corbyn's election victory, Bennett said: "I approve of him. If only because it brings Labour back to what they ought to be thinking about."

Following the death of Jonathan Miller in 2019, Bennett became the last surviving member of the original Beyond the Fringe quartet which had also included Peter Cook and Dudley Moore.

For many years Bennett has owned a cottage in Clapham in the Yorkshire Dales.

== Selected credits ==
=== Film ===
- A Private Function (screenplay), 1984
- Prick Up Your Ears (screenplay), 1987
- Little Dorrit, 1987
- The Madness of King George (screenplay), 1994
- The History Boys (screenplay), 2006
- The Lady in the Van (screenplay), 2015
- Allelujah (co-written), 2022
- The Choral (screenplay), 2025

=== Theatre ===
- The Madness of George III (writer), 1991
- The Wind in the Willows (writer), 1991
- Talking Heads (also writer), 1992
- The Lady in the Van (writer), 1999
- The History Boys (writer), 2004
- The Habit of Art (writer), 2009
- People (writer), 2012
- Cocktail Sticks (writer), 2012
- Allelujah! (writer), 2018

== Bibliography ==
- Beyond the Fringe (with Peter Cook, Jonathan Miller, and Dudley Moore). London: Souvenir Press, 1962, and New York: Random House, 1963
- Forty Years On, London: Faber, 1969
- Getting On, London: Faber, 1972
- Habeas Corpus, London: Faber, 1973
- The Old Country, London: Faber, 1978
- Enjoy, London: Faber, 1980
- Office Suite, London: Faber, 1981
- Objects of Affection, London: BBC Publications, 1982
- A Private Function, London: Faber, 1984
- Forty Years On; Getting On; Habeas Corpus, London: Faber, 1985
- The Writer in Disguise, London: Faber, 1985
- Prick Up Your Ears: The Film Screenplay, London: Faber, 1987
- Two Kafka Plays, London: Faber, 1987
- Talking Heads, London: BBC Publications, 1988; New York: Summit, 1990
- Single Spies, London: Faber, 1989
- The Lady in the Van (essay in the London Review of Books), 1989
- The Lady in the Van (book), 1990
- Single Spies and Talking Heads, New York: Summit, 1990
- Poetry in Motion, (with others). 1990
- The Wind in the Willows, London: Faber, 1991
- Forty Years on and Other Plays, London: Faber, 1991
- The Madness of George III, London: Faber, 1992
- Poetry in Motion 2 (with others) 1992
- Writing Home (memoir, essays and diaries) London: Faber, 1994
- The Madness of King George (screenplay), 1995
- Father! Father! Burning Bright (prose version of 1982 TV script, Intensive Care), 1999
- The Laying on of Hands (stories), 2000
- The Clothes They Stood Up In (novella), 2001
- Untold Stories (memoir, essays and diaries), London, 2005, ISBN 0-571-22830-5
- The Uncommon Reader (novella), London, 2007
- A Life Like Other People's (memoir), London, 2009
- Smut: Two Unseemly Stories (stories), London, 2011
- Six Poets: Hardy to Larkin: An Anthology, London: Faber, 2015
- Keeping On Keeping On (memoir, essays and diaries), London, 2016
- The Shielding of Mrs Forbes, London: Faber, 2019 (part of Faber Stories series)
- House Arrest: Pandemic Diaries, London: Faber, 2022
- Killing Time (novella), London: Faber, 2024
- Enough Said (diaries), London: Faber, 2026

== Awards and honours ==
Bennett was made an Honorary Fellow of Exeter College, Oxford, in 1987. He was also awarded a D.Litt by the University of Leeds in 1990 and an honorary doctorate from Kingston University in 1996. In 1998 he refused an honorary doctorate from Oxford University, in protest at its acceptance of funding for a chair from press baron Rupert Murdoch. He also declined a CBE in 1988 and a knighthood in 1996. He has stated that, although he is not a republican, he would never wish to be knighted, saying it would be a bit like having to wear a suit for the rest of his life.

In December 2011, Bennett returned to Lawnswood School, nearly 60 years after he left, to unveil the renamed Alan Bennett Library. He said he "loosely" based The History Boys on his experiences at the school and his admission to Oxford. Lawnswood School dedicated its library to the writer after he emerged as a vocal campaigner against public library cuts. Plans to shut local libraries were "wrong and very short-sighted", Bennett said, adding: "We're impoverishing young people."

== In popular culture ==
- In the film for television Not Only But Always, about the careers of Peter Cook and Dudley Moore, Bennett is portrayed by Alan Cox.
- Along with the other members of Beyond the Fringe, Bennett is portrayed in the play Pete and Dud: Come Again, by Chris Bartlett and Nick Awde.
- Bennett voices himself in the episode "Brian's Play" of the animated series Family Guy.
- Bennett was portrayed by Harry Enfield as Stalin, in an episode of "Talking Heads of State", in BBC Two's 2014 satirical Harry and Paul's Story of the Twos.
- Bennett is portrayed by Reece Dinsdale in a 2014 production of Untold Stories at the West Yorkshire Playhouse.
- Bennett is portrayed by British actor Alex Jennings in the 2015 comedy-drama film The Lady in the Van. He appears as himself briefly at the end of the film.
- In the season 2 episode "Mystery Man" of the Netflix show The Crown, Bennett is portrayed by British actor Seb Carrington.
- In Stewart Lee's 2022 comedy special "Tornado", Bennett appears as himself at the very end. In the appearance, Bennett states that Erving Goffman would have enjoyed the special. This refers to a review of Lee's comedy that Bennett wrote for The London Review of Books in 2017 and acts as a callback to a previous joke in the special.

== See also ==
- List of British actors
- List of British playwrights since 1950
- List of Academy Award winners and nominees from Great Britain
