= John Lithgow on screen and stage =

American actor

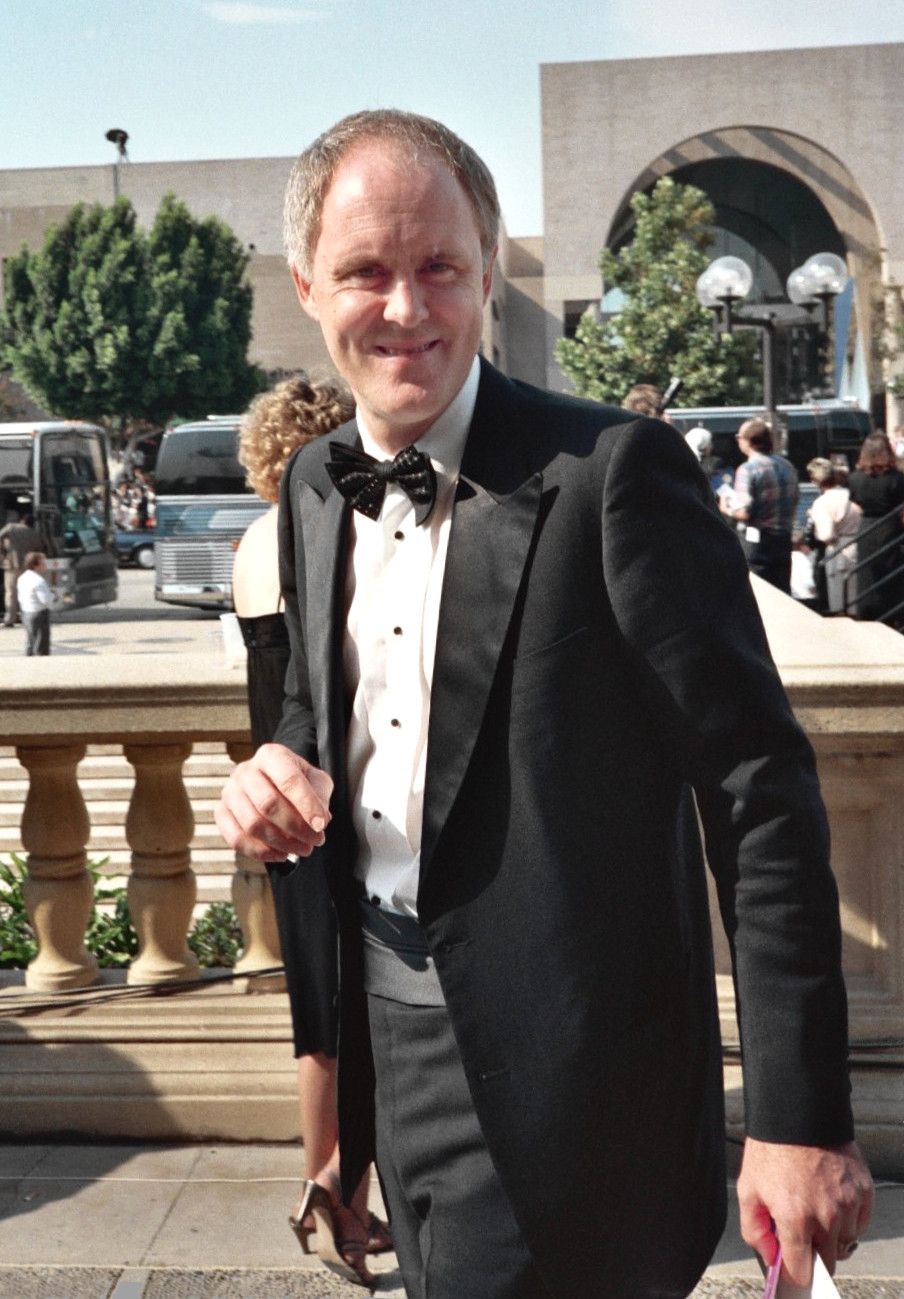
Lithgow attending the red carpet prior to the 40th Primetime Emmy Awards in 1988

John Lithgow is an American actor. He made his film debut in the comedy-drama Dealing: Or the Berkeley-to-Boston Forty-Brick Lost-Bag Blues (1972). He has since then appeared in over 50 films, countless television projects and on stage. Lithgow's first appearance on stage came in 1973, in a Broadway production of The Changing Room by David Storey, for which he won a Tony Award for Best Performance by a Featured Actor in a Play and a Drama Desk Award. Some of his other theater work he performed in were My Fat Friend (1974), Trelawny of the 'Wells' (1975) and the 1976 plays A Memory of Two Mondays / 27 Wagons Full of Cotton, Secret Service and Boy Meets Girl. Lithgow subsequently acted in films such as Obsession (1976), The Big Fix (1978), the 1979 films All That Jazz with Roy Scheider and Rich Kids, Blow Out (1981) starring John Travolta, and I'm Dancing as Fast as I Can (1982).

Lithgow's film breakthrough came after playing a transgender woman, Roberta Muldoon, who was a former football player, in a supporting role in the comedy-drama The World According to Garp (1982) with Robin Williams. Lithgow was nominated for an Academy Award for Best Supporting Actor for his role. He then portrayed an airplane passenger who suffers from aviophobia in Twilight Zone: The Movie (1983). Later the same year, Lithgow went on to play a science professor in the television disaster film The Day After, which won him an Emmy Award nomination for Outstanding Supporting Actor in a Miniseries or Special. As 1983 came to a close, he also featured in Terms of Endearment, where he played the role of a banker with Shirley MacLaine, Debra Winger and Jack Nicholson, thus earning Lithgow his second Academy Award nomination in the same category. In addition, Lithgow had a string of main and supporting roles during the 1980s, notably in the 1984 films Footloose, The Adventures of Buckaroo Banzai Across the 8th Dimension, 2010, Santa Claus: The Movie (1985), The Manhattan Project (1986), and Harry and the Hendersons (1987).

The 1990s saw Lithgow continue to appear in various Hollywood films, namely Ricochet (1991) opposite Denzel Washington, Raising Cain (1992), Cliffhanger (1993) starring Sylvester Stallone and The Pelican Brief (1993), where he was reunited with Washington. He was cast in a main role in the 1996 television sitcom 3rd Rock from the Sun, where he played a high-ranking commander of an alien unit of four who have been sent to Earth to retrieve information under the disguise as a university professor. The show spanned over 100 episodes, during which Lithgow won one Golden Globe and three Emmy Awards for his role, before ending in 2001. That same year, he became the character of Lord Farquaad in the animated fantasy-comedy film Shrek (2001).

Other roles Lithgow appeared in during the 2000s were The Life and Death of Peter Sellers (2004) with Geoffrey Rush, where he portrayed the famed director, screenwriter and producer Blake Edwards, Kinsey (2004), and Dreamgirls (2006). Lithgow also starred in the short-lived sitcom Twenty Good Years (2006). In 2009, he joined the cast of crime show Dexter as Arthur Mitchell, a family man who lives a double life as a serial killer. He appeared in a total of twelve episodes as the main antagonist on the fourth season, and for his performance, he won his second Golden Globe and fifth Emmy Award. Lithgow's later roles during the 2010s includes the science fiction film Rise of the Planet of the Apes (2011), the political comedy The Campaign (2012), the comedy-drama This Is 40 (2012), the sitcom How I Met Your Mother (2005–14), where he performed as a guest star in four episodes in the role as the father of executive Barney Stinson, as the voice of Percy the White Rabbit in ABC's fantasy-drama and spin-off program Once Upon a Time in Wonderland (2013–14), and the 2014 films Love Is Strange, alongside fellow co-star Alfred Molina, The Homesman, and Interstellar. Other films include Daddy's Home 2 (2017), Pitch Perfect 3 (2017), a new adaptation of Stephen King's novel, Pet Sematary (2019), and Bombshell (2019). Lithgow can be seen as Winston Churchill in the television drama series The Crown (2016). Lithgow will play Albus Dumbledore in HBO's forthcoming Harry Potter television series.

== Acting credits ==
=== Film ===
Year	Title	Role(s)	Notes	Ref(s)
1972	Dealing: Or the Berkeley-to-Boston Forty-Brick Lost-Bag Blues	John		
1976	Obsession	Robert LaSalle		
1978	The Big Fix	Sam Sebastian		
1979	Rich Kids	Paul Philips		
1979	All That Jazz	Lucas Sergeant		
1981	Blow Out	Burke		
1982	I'm Dancing as Fast as I Can	Mr. Brunner		
1982	The World According to Garp	Roberta Muldoon		
1983	Terms of Endearment	Sam Burns		
1983	Twilight Zone: The Movie	John Valentine	Segment: "Nightmare at 20,000 Feet"	
1984	Footloose	Reverend Shaw Moore		
1984	The Adventures of Buckaroo Banzai Across the 8th Dimension	Dr. Emilio Lizardo / Lord John Whorfin		
1984	2010: The Year We Make Contact	Dr. Walter Curnow		
1985	Santa Claus: The Movie	B.Z.		
1986	Mesmerized	Oliver Thompson		
1986	The Manhattan Project	John Mathewson		
1987	Harry and the Hendersons	George Henderson		
1988	Distant Thunder	Mark Lambert		
1989	Out Cold	Dave Geary		
1990	Memphis Belle	Lt. Col. Bruce Derringer		
1991	L.A. Story	Harry Zell	Scenes deleted	
1991	At Play in the Fields of the Lord	Leslie Huben		
1991	Ricochet	Earl Talbot Blake		
1992	Raising Cain	Carter / Cain / Dr. Nix / Josh / Margo		
1993	The Wrong Man	Phillip Mills		
1993	The Pelican Brief	Smith Keen		
1993	Love, Cheat & Steal	Paul Harrington		
1993	Cliffhanger	Eric Qualen		
1994	Silent Fall	Dr. Rene Harlinger		
1994	Princess Caraboo	Professor Wilkinson		
1994	A Good Man in Africa	Arthur Fanshawe		
1996	Hollow Point	Thomas Livingston		
1998	Homegrown	Malcolm / Robert Stockman		
1998	Johnny Skidmarks	Sergeant Larry Skovik		
1998	A Civil Action	Judge Walter J. Skinner		
2000	Rugrats in Paris: The Movie	Jean-Claude	Voice role	
2001	Shrek	Lord Farquaad	Voice role	
2002	Orange County	Bud Brumder		
2004	The Life and Death of Peter Sellers	Blake Edwards		
2004	Kinsey	Alfred Seguine Kinsey		
2006	Dreamgirls	Jerry Harris		
2009	Confessions of a Shopaholic	Edgar West		
2010	Leap Year	Jack Brady		
2011	Rise of the Planet of the Apes	Charles Rodman		
2011	New Year's Eve	Jonathan Cox		
2011	The Jungle Bunch: The Movie	Maurice	Voice role; English dub; direct-to-video	
2012	The Campaign	Glenn Motch		
2012	This Is 40	Oliver		
2012	Casting By	Himself	Documentary	
2014	Love Is Strange	Benjamin Arthur Hull		
2014	The Homesman	Reverend Alfred Dowd		
2014	Interstellar	Donald		
2015	Best of Enemies	Gore Vidal	Voice role; documentary	
2016	The Accountant	Lamar Blackburn		
2016	Miss Sloane	Senator Ron M. Sperling		
2017	Beatriz at Dinner	Doug Strutt		
2017	Daddy's Home 2	Don Whitaker		
2017	Pitch Perfect 3	Fergus Hobart		
2019	Late Night	Walter Newbury		
2019	The Tomorrow Man	Ed Hemsler		
2019	Pet Sematary	Jud Crandall		
2019	Bombshell	Roger Ailes		
2022	The Bubble	Tom the Studio Chairman	Cameo	
2023	Sharper	Richard Hobbes		
2023	Killers of the Flower Moon	Prosecutor Peter Leaward		
2024	Cabrini	Mayor Gould		
2024	Conclave	Cardinal Tremblay		
2024	The Rule of Jenny Pen	Dave Crealy		
2024	Spellbound	Minister Bolinar	Voice role	
2025	Jimpa	Jimpa		

=== Television ===
Year	Title	Role(s)	Notes	Ref(s)
1974	The Country Girl	Paul Unger	Television film	
1977	Great Performances	Captain Thorne	Episode: "Secret Service"	
1980	The Oldest Living Graduate	Clarence Sickenger	Television film	
1980	Mom, the Wolfman and Me	Wally	Television film	
1980	Big Blonde	Herbie Morse	Television film	
1982	Not In Front of the Children	Richard Carruthers	Television film	
1983	The Day After	Professor Joe Huxley	Television film	
1984	Faerie Tale Theatre	Goldilocks' father	Episode: "Goldilocks and the Three Bears"	
1984	The Glitter Dome	Sergeant Marty Wellborn	Television film	
1985–1988	Saturday Night Live	Himself	Host; 3 episodes	
1986	Amazing Stories	John Walters	Episode: "The Doll"	
1986	Resting Place	Major Kendall Laird	Television film	
1987	Baby Girl Scott	Neil Scott	Television film	
1989	Traveling Man	Ben Cluett	Television film	
1990	Ivory Hunters	Robert Carter	Television film	
1991	The Boys	Artie Margulies	Television film	
1993	The Country Mouse and the City Mouse: A Christmas Tale	Alexander	Voice role; animated television special	
1994	World War II: When Lions Roared	Pres. Franklin D. Roosevelt	Television film	
1995	Tales from the Crypt	Dr. Oscar Charles	Episode: "You, Murderer"	
1995	My Brother's Keeper	Tom Bradley / Bob Bradley	Television film	
1995	Frasier	Madman Martinez	Voice role; episode: "Someone to Watch Over Me"	
1995	Redwood Curtain	Laird Riordan	Television film	
1995	The Tuskegee Airmen	Senator Conyers	Television film	
1996–2001	3rd Rock from the Sun	Dick Solomon	139 episodes	
1999	Cosby	Himself	Episode: "Superstar"	
2000	Don Quixote	Don Quixote de la Mancha / Alonso Quijano	Television film	
2003	Freedom: A History of Us	Benjamin Rush / Roger Williams / Henry Billings Brown / Ward Hunt	Voice role; 4 episodes	
2006	Twenty Good Years	John Mason	13 episodes (Note: Although only four episodes were broadcast by NBC before the series was removed from the schedule, 13 were produced.)	
2009	Dexter	Arthur Mitchell "The Trinity Killer"	12 episodes	
2009	30 Rock	Himself	Episode: "Goodbye, My Friend"	
2011	Prohibition	H. L. Mencken	Voice role; 3 episodes	
2011–2014	How I Met Your Mother	Jerome "Jerry" Whitaker	4 episodes	
2013	Timms Valley	Ol' Gregory Timms	Voice role; pilot	
2013–2014	Once Upon a Time in Wonderland	Percy the White Rabbit	Voice role; 13 episodes	
2014	Drunk History	William Randolph Hearst / George Washington	2 episodes	
2015	Louie	Funny Man	Episode: "Sleepover"	
2016–2019	The Crown	Winston Churchill	Main role (Season 1); supporting role (Seasons 2–3); 11 episodes	
2017	Trial & Error	Professor Larry Henderson	13 episodes	
2019, 2022	The Simpsons	Himself (voice) / Augustus "Gus" Redfield	Episodes: "I'm Just a Girl Who Can't Say D'oh" and "Meat Is Murder"	
2019–2022	The Late Show with Stephen Colbert	Rudy Giuliani	4 episodes	
2020	Perry Mason	Elias Birchard "E.B." Jonathan	5 episodes	
2021	Wolfboy and the Everything Factory	Professor Chronopher (voice)	Episode: "Losing Track of Time / Chaos Comes to Class"	
2021	Live in Front of a Studio Audience	Phillip Drummond	Episode: "Diff'rent Strokes" and "The Facts of Life"	
2021	Dexter: New Blood	Arthur Mitchell "The Trinity Killer"	Episode: "Skin of Her Teeth"	
2022–2024	The Old Man	Harold Harper	Main cast	
2024	Art Happens Here with John Lithgow	Himself	Television film	
2025	Dexter: Resurrection	Arthur Mitchell "The Trinity Killer"	Episode: "A Beating Heart..."	
2026–present	Harry Potter †	Professor Albus Dumbledore	Main cast; Post-production	

=== Theater ===
Year	Title	Role	Director(s)	Venue	Ref(s)
1973	The Changing Room	Kenny Kendal	Michael Rudman	Morosco Theatre	
1974	My Fat Friend	James	Robert Moore	Brooks Atkinson Theatre	
1975	Hamlet	Laertes / Player King	Michael Rudman	Delacorte Theater	
1975	Trelawny of the 'Wells'	Mr. Ferdinand Gadd	A. J. Antoon	Vivian Beaumont Theatre	
1976	A Memory of Two Mondays; 27 Wagons Full of Cotton	Kenneth	Arvin Brown	Playhouse Theatre	
1976	Secret Service	Captain Thorne	Daniel Freudenberger	Playhouse Theatre	
1976	Boy Meets Girl		Himself	Playhouse Theatre	
1976–1977	Comedians	Ged Murray	Mike Nichols	Music Box Theatre	
1977	Anna Christie	Mat Burke	José Quintero	Imperial Theatre	
1978	Once in a Lifetime	George Lewis	Tom Moore	Circle in the Square Theatre	
1979	Spokesong	Frank	Kenneth Frankel	Circle in the Square Theatre	
1980	Salt Lake City Skyline	Joe Hill	Robert Allan Ackerman	The Public Theater	
1980	Division Street	Chris	Tom Moore	Ambassador Theatre	
1981–1982	Kaufman at Large	George S. Kaufman	Himself; Steven Robman	Marymount Manhattan Theatre	
1982	Beyond Therapy	Bruce	John Madden	Brooks Atkinson Theatre	
1985	Requiem for a Heavyweight	Harlan "Mountain" McClintock	Arvin Brown	Martin Beck Theatre	
1986–1987	The Front Page	Walter Burns	Jerry Zaks	Vivian Beaumont Theatre	
1988–1990	M. Butterfly	Rene Gallimard	John Dexter	Eugene O'Neill Theatre	
2002	Sweet Smell of Success	J. J. Hunsecker	Nicholas Hytner	Martin Beck Theatre	
2003–2004	The Retreat from Moscow	Edward	Daniel Sullivan	Booth Theatre	
2005–2006	Dirty Rotten Scoundrels	Lawrence Jameson	Jack O'Brien	Imperial Theatre	
2007	Twelfth Night	Malvolio	Neil Bartlett	Courtyard Theatre	
2008–2009	All My Sons	Joe Keller	Simon McBurney	Gerald Schoenfeld Theatre	
2010	Mr. & Mrs. Fitch	Mr. Fitch	Scott Ellis	Second Stage Theatre	
2011	8	Theodore Olson	Joe Mantello	Eugene O'Neill Theatre	
2012	The Columnist	Joseph Alsop	Daniel Sullivan	Samuel J. Friedman Theatre	
2012–2013	The Magistrate	Aeneas Posket	Timothy Sheader	Royal National Theatre	
2014	King Lear	Leir of Britain	Daniel Sullivan	Delacorte Theater	
2014–2015	A Delicate Balance	Tobias	Pam MacKinnon	John Golden Theatre	
2018	John Lithgow: Stories by Heart	Himself	Daniel Sullivan	American Airlines Theatre	
2018	Candide	Voltaire / Dr. Pangloss	Gary Griffin	Carnegie Hall	
2019	Hillary and Clinton	Bill Clinton	Joe Mantello	John Golden Theatre	
2024	Giant	Roald Dahl	Nicholas Hytner	Royal Court Theatre	
2025	Giant	Roald Dahl	Nicholas Hytner	Harold Pinter Theatre	
2026	Giant	Roald Dahl	Nicholas Hytner	Music Box Theatre	

== Narrator ==
Year	Title	Notes	Ref(s)
1985	The Amazing Bone	Story	
1992	Dr. Seuss Video Classics: Yertle the Turtle	Story	
1993	Sylvester and the Magic Pebble	Story	
1996	Special Effects: Anything Can Happen	Documentary	
1998	The Gold Rush	Documentary	
1999	Adventures in Time: The National Geographic Millennium Special	Documentary	
2000	Culture Shock	Episode: "The Shock of the Nude: Manet's Olympia"	
2001	95 Worlds and Counting	Documentary	
2001–2010	Nova	6 episodes	
2011	Truly California: Our State, Our Stories	Episode: "Miracle in a Box"	
2014	Projections of America	Documentary	

== Audio drama ==
Year	Title	Role	Author	Production company	Notes	Ref(s)
2021	The Sandman: Act II	Joshua Norton	Neil Gaiman, Dirk Maggs	Audible		

== Radio ==
Year	Title	Role	Notes	Ref(s)
1981, 1983	Star Wars	Yoda	Radio drama	

== See also ==
- List of awards and nominations received by John Lithgow
