= List of awards and nominations received by John Lithgow =

John Lithgow awards and nominations
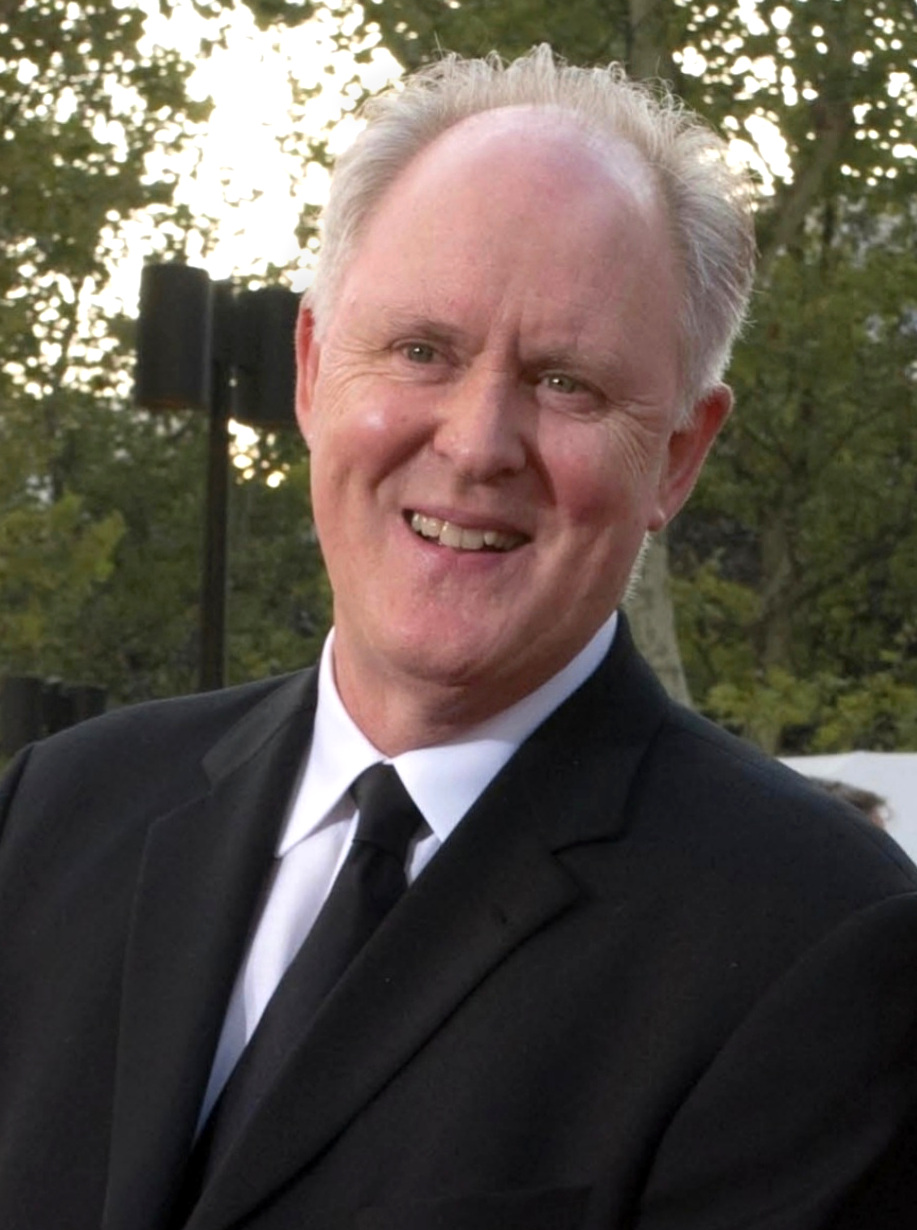
- Lithgow at the Met Opera in 2008
Awards and nominations
Award	Wins	Nominations
Academy Awards	0	2
Actor Awards	4	12
BAFTA Awards	0	1
Critics' Choice Awards	2	7
Emmy Awards	7	14
Grammy Awards	0	4
Golden Globe Awards	2	6
Actor Awards	4	9
Laurence Olivier Awards	1	1
Tony Awards	3	7

Totals (Note: Certain award groups do not simply award one winner. They acknowledge several different recipients, have runners-up, and have third place. Since this is a specific recognition and is different from losing an award, runner-up mentions are considered wins in this award tally. For simplification and to avoid errors, each award in this list has been presumed to have had a prior nomination.)
- Wins: 26
- Nominations: 70

John Lithgow is an American actor. Over his extensive career with diverse roles on stage and screen, he has received numerous accolades including four Actor Awards, two Critics' Choice Awards, seven Emmy Awards, two Golden Globe Awards, a Laurence Olivier Award, and three Tony Awards, as well as nominations for two Academy Awards, a British Academy Film Award and four Grammy Awards. Lithgow has received a star on the Hollywood Walk of Fame and has been inducted into the American Theater Hall of Fame.

Lithgow received Academy Award for Best Supporting Actor nominations for his performances as a transsexual ex-football player in the comedy-drama The World According to Garp (1982) and a lonely banker in the family drama Terms of Endearment (1983). He portrayed Roger Ailes in the political drama Bombshell (2019) and prosecutor Peter Leaward in the western crime drama Killers of the Flower Moon (2023). For both films, Lithgow along with ensemble received nominations for the Screen Actors Guild Award for Outstanding Performance by a Cast in a Motion Picture.

On television, he has received six Primetime Emmy Awards. He won his first for Outstanding Guest Actor in a Drama Series playing lonely man in Amazing Stories (1986), followed by three wins for Outstanding Lead Actor in a Comedy Series for his role as Dick Solomon in the NBC sitcom 3rd Rock from the Sun (1996–2001). He later won for Outstanding Guest Actor in a Drama Series for playing a serial killer in the crime series Dexter (2010), and for Outstanding Supporting Actor in a Drama Series playing Winston Churchill in the Netflix historical drama series The Crown (2017).

Lithgow started his career acting in numerous productions at The Public Theater and off Broadway. He gained acclaim for his extensive work on Broadway, where he has received two Tony Awards. He won his first for Best Featured Actor in a Play for playing a rugby player in The Changing Room (1973), and Best Actor in a Musical playing newspaper columnist J.J. Hunsecker in Sweet Smell of Success (2002). Lithgow was also Tony-nominated for his roles in Requiem for a Heavyweight (1985), M. Butterfly (1988), Dirty Rotten Scoundrels (2005), and The Columnist (2012). On the West End he portrayed Roald Dahl in the Mark Rosenblatt play Giant (2024) for which he won the Laurence Olivier Award for Best Actor.

== Major associations ==
=== Academy Awards ===
Year	Category	Nominated work	Result	Ref.
1983	Best Supporting Actor	The World According to Garp	Nominated	
1984	Best Supporting Actor	Terms of Endearment	Nominated	

=== Actor Awards ===
Year	Category	Nominated work	Result	Ref.
1997	Outstanding Ensemble in a Comedy Series	3rd Rock from the Sun	Nominated	
1997	Outstanding Actor in a Comedy Series	3rd Rock from the Sun	Won	
1998	Outstanding Actor in a Comedy Series	3rd Rock from the Sun	Won	
1998	Outstanding Ensemble in a Comedy Series	3rd Rock from the Sun	Nominated	
2000	Outstanding Ensemble in a Comedy Series	3rd Rock from the Sun	Nominated	
2001	Outstanding Actor in a Miniseries or Television Film	Don Quixote	Nominated	
2010	Outstanding Ensemble in a Drama Series	Dexter	Nominated	
2017	Outstanding Ensemble in a Drama Series	The Crown	Nominated	
2017	Outstanding Actor in a Drama Series	The Crown	Won	
2020	Outstanding Cast in a Motion Picture	Bombshell	Nominated	
2024	Outstanding Cast in a Motion Picture	Killers of the Flower Moon	Nominated	
2025	Outstanding Cast in a Motion Picture	Conclave	Won	

=== BAFTA Awards ===
Year	Category	Nominated work	Result	Ref.
British Academy Television Awards
2017	Best Supporting Actor	The Crown	Nominated	

=== Critics' Choice Awards ===
Year	Category	Nominated work	Result	Ref.
Critics' Choice Movie Awards
2020	Best Acting Ensemble	Bombshell	Nominated	
2024	Best Acting Ensemble	Killers of the Flower Moon	Nominated	
2025	Best Acting Ensemble	Conclave	Won	
Critics' Choice Television Awards
2016	Best Supporting Actor in a Drama Series	The Crown	Won	
2021	Best Supporting Actor in a Drama Series	Perry Mason	Nominated	
2023	Best Supporting Actor in a Drama Series	The Old Man	Nominated	
2025	Best Supporting Actor in a Drama Series	The Old Man	Nominated	

=== Emmy Awards ===
Year	Category	Nominated work	Result	Ref.
Primetime Emmy Awards
1984	Outstanding Supporting Actor in a Limited Series or a Special	The Day After	Nominated	
1986	Outstanding Guest Performer in a Drama Series	Amazing Stories (episode: "The Doll")	Won	
1986	Outstanding Lead Actor in a Miniseries or a Special	Resting Place	Nominated	
1995	Outstanding Lead Actor in a Miniseries or a Special	My Brother's Keeper	Nominated	
1996	Outstanding Lead Actor in a Comedy Series	3rd Rock from the Sun (episode: "Dick, Smoker")	Won	
1997	Outstanding Lead Actor in a Comedy Series	3rd Rock from the Sun (episode: "See Dick Continue to Run")	Won	
1998	Outstanding Lead Actor in a Comedy Series	3rd Rock from the Sun (episode: "Stuck with Dick")	Nominated	
1999	Outstanding Lead Actor in a Comedy Series	3rd Rock from the Sun (episode: "What's Love Got to Do with Dick?")	Won	
2000	Outstanding Lead Actor in a Comedy Series	3rd Rock from the Sun (episode: ""Frankie Goes to Rutherford")	Nominated	
2001	Outstanding Lead Actor in a Comedy Series	3rd Rock from the Sun (episode: "Red, White, and Dick")	Nominated	
2010	Outstanding Guest Actor in a Drama Series	Dexter (episode: "Road Kill")	Won	
2017	Outstanding Supporting Actor in a Drama Series	The Crown (episode: "Assassins")	Won	
2021	Outstanding Supporting Actor in a Drama Series	Perry Mason (episode: "Chapter 4")	Nominated	
Children's and Family Emmy Awards
2025	Outstanding Single Voice Role Performer	Spellbound	Won	

=== Golden Globe Awards ===
Year	Category	Nominated work	Result	Ref.
1997	Best Actor – Television Series Musical or Comedy	3rd Rock from the Sun	Won	
1998	Best Actor – Television Series Musical or Comedy	3rd Rock from the Sun	Nominated	
1999	Best Actor – Television Series Musical or Comedy	3rd Rock from the Sun	Nominated	
2010	Best Supporting Actor – Television	Dexter	Won	
2017	Best Supporting Actor – Television	The Crown	Nominated	
2023	Best Supporting Actor – Television	The Old Man	Nominated	

=== Grammy Awards ===
Year	Category	Nominated work	Result	Ref.
2002	Best Spoken Word Album for Children	Ogden Nash's the Christmas that Almost Wasn't	Nominated	
2004	Best Spoken Word Album for Children	Carnival of the Animals	Nominated	
2004	Best Spoken Word Album	The World According to Mr. Rogers	Nominated	
2006	Best Musical Album for Children	The Sunny Side of the Street	Nominated	

=== Laurence Olivier Awards ===
Year	Category	Nominated work	Result	Ref.
2025	Best Actor	Giant	Won	

=== Tony Awards ===
Year	Category	Nominated work	Result	Ref.
1973	Best Featured Actor in a Play	The Changing Room	Won	
1985	Best Leading Actor in a Play	Requiem for a Heavyweight	Nominated	
1988	Best Leading Actor in a Play	M. Butterfly	Nominated	
2002	Best Leading Actor in a Musical	Sweet Smell of Success	Won	
2005	Best Leading Actor in a Musical	Dirty Rotten Scoundrels	Nominated	
2012	Best Leading Actor in a Play	The Columnist	Nominated	
2026	Best Leading Actor in a Play	Giant	Won	

== Theatre awards ==
Organizations	Year	Category	Work	Result	Ref.
Drama Desk Awards	1973	Outstanding Performance	The Changing Room	Won	
Drama Desk Awards	1985	Outstanding Actor in a Play	Requiem for a Heavyweight	Won	
Drama Desk Awards	1988	Outstanding Actor in a Play	M. Butterfly	Nominated	
Drama Desk Awards	2002	Outstanding Actor in a Musical	Sweet Smell of Success	Won	
Drama Desk Awards	2004	Outstanding Featured Actor in a Play	Mrs. Farnsworth	Nominated	
Drama Desk Awards	2026	Outstanding Lead Performance in a Play	Giant	Won	
Outer Critics Circle Awards	2002	Best Actor in a Musical	Sweet Smell of Success	Won	
Outer Critics Circle Awards	2018	Outstanding Solo Performance	John Lithgow: Stories by Heart	Nominated	
Outer Critics Circle Awards	2026	Outstanding Lead Performer in a Broadway Play	Giant	Nominated	
Dorian Award	2026	Outstanding Lead Performance in a Broadway Play	Giant	Won	

== Miscellaneous awards ==
Organizations	Year	Category	Work	Result	Ref.
AACTA Awards	2020	Best International Supporting Actor – Cinema	Bombshell	Nominated	
Independent Spirit Award	2014	Best Male Lead	Love is Strange	Nominated	
Los Angeles Film Critics Association	1982	Best Supporting Actor	The World According to Garp	Won	
Los Angeles Film Critics Association	1983	Best Supporting Actor	Terms of Endearment / Twilight Zone: The Movie	Nominated	
New York Film Critics Circle	1982	Best Supporting Actor	The World According to Garp	Won	
New York Film Critics Circle	1983	Best Supporting Actor	Terms of Endearment / Twilight Zone: The Movie	Nominated	
People's Choice Awards	1996	Favorite Male Television Performer	3rd Rock from the Sun	Nominated	
People's Choice Awards	1997	Favorite Male Television Performer	3rd Rock from the Sun	Nominated	
People's Choice Awards	1998	Favorite Male Television Performer	3rd Rock from the Sun	Nominated	
People's Choice Awards	1999	Favorite Male Television Performer	3rd Rock from the Sun	Nominated	
Satellite Awards	1997	Best Actor – Television Series Musical or Comedy	3rd Rock from the Sun	Won	
Satellite Awards	1998	Best Actor – Television Series Musical or Comedy	3rd Rock from the Sun	Nominated	
Satellite Awards	2009	Best Supporting Actor – Series, Miniseries or Television Film	Dexter	Won	
Saturn Awards	1984	Best Supporting Actor	Twilight Zone: The Movie	Won	
Saturn Awards	1985	Best Supporting Actor	The Adventures of Buckaroo Banzai	Nominated	
Saturn Awards	1993	Best Actor	Raising Cain	Nominated	
Saturn Awards	2010	Best Guest Starring Role on Television	Dexter	Nominated	
Saturn Awards	2019	Best Supporting Actor	Pet Sematary	Nominated	

== Honorary awards ==
Organizations	Year	Award	Result	Ref.
Hollywood Walk of Fame	2001	Motion Picture Star	Honored	
American Theater Hall of Fame	2005	Inductee	Honored	
Harvard University	2005	Honorary Doctorate	Honored	
American Academy of Arts and Sciences	2010	Fellow	Honored	
Harvard University	2017	Harvard Arts Medal	Honored	
London Academy of Music and Dramatic Art	2025	Master of Dramatic Art	Honored	
