= Carmen De La Paz =

Puerto Rico-born American TV personality

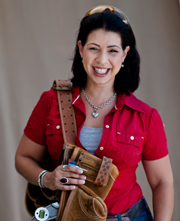
- Carmen with her tool belt
- Born: Carmen Nery De La Paz; San Juan, Puerto Rico
- Occupations: Television personality, interior/exterior designer, wood turner, welder, professional cook
- Years active: 1986–present
- Website: http://carmendelapaz.com

Carmen Nery De La Paz is an American television personality, interior/exterior designer, wood turner, welder, and professional cook.

She is best known for her work on HGTV's Hammer Heads, Design Star and All American Handyman. De La Paz is a brand ambassador for Minnesota-based manufacturing company, 3M.

== Personal life ==
De La Paz was born in San Juan, Puerto Rico and raised in Waukesha, Wisconsin. De La Paz started playing the violin at age 7, singing and dancing by the age of 8 and playing the guitar by 9. As a teen, De La Paz was a member of "The Kids from Wisconsin," music ambassadors from Wisconsin that traveled the country, performing over 80 live shows in the course of a summer. De La Paz attended Syracuse University, where she graduated with a BFA in Music Theatre. She also studied Broadcast Journalism though the UCLA Certificate program.

== Career ==
=== Television ===
De La Paz is most recognized for her carpentry and design skills featured on six seasons of HGTV's makeover series Hammer Heads, with fellow carpenters Steve Hanneman and Marcus Hunts. In each episode, they introduce homeowners to power tools, new building materials and creative designs. Her role in Hammer Heads led to her nominations for the 2011 & 2010 Imagen Award for Best Reality Show.

De La Paz also appears on Fox International's Spanish-language programming and is distributed in 17 countries. She appears in the Spanish language talk show Hola Martin –Estilo de Vida. Hola Martin is taped in Buenos Aires and airs on the Spanish-language channel UTILISIMA, distributed by FOX International to countries including the U.S., Spain, Venezuela, Mexico, Canada, El Salvador, Chile, Guatemala, Peru, Bolivia and Colombia. The show premiered in fall 2010. In Hola Martin, De La Paz teaches viewers crafting and DIY projects focusing on environmentally friendly and cost-effective ways to be creative.

In fall 2011, De La Paz appeared on the HGTV show Design Star. De La Paz was also a guest judge on an episode of All American Handyman in the fall of 2010.

For two seasons, HGTV's ShowDown featured De La Paz as the only female carpenter to compete in the show, bringing a female perspective to the combination of home improvement, power tools, design and "do-it-yourself".

De La Paz acted as co-host to John Lithgow in Paloozaville, based on the book Palooza, also written by Lithgow. As "Side Kick" Suza Palooza, De La Paz shared her energy and enthusiasm for teaching by guiding children and parents in the "how-to" children's show focused on creative learning.

=== Music & theater ===
De La Paz made her Broadway debut at New York City Lincoln Center's production of In the Summer House starring Dianne Wiest, Liev Schreiber and Frances Conroy. De La Paz is a member of Actor's Equity Association and has performed in national touring companies, as well as regional and professional children's theatre. A trained musician, De La Paz plays nine instruments and is an alto singer.

=== Design ===
De La Paz is the owner of De La Paz Designs, an interior/exterior design studio specializing in creating designs focusing on custom and "one of a kind" creations including decorative finishes and custom made furniture for interior/exterior residential and commercial spaces. De La Paz has designed both residential and commercial spaces in Los Angeles and New York City, as well as her hometown of Waukesha.

With her experience in the design industry, De La Paz is knowledgeable in techniques ranging from venetian plaster, wood graining and gilding, to stenciling and furniture refinishing. In addition to her experience in decorative textures and finishes, she is a carpenter and mason, working in woodturning, stone, cement/tile and glass work.

=== Current projects ===
De La Paz launched her own television show – Be Handy Con Carmen for Fox International's new Spanish-language channel UTILISIMA! in Fall 2011. With De La Paz as producer and host, the show focuses on home improvement, power tools, design and "do-it-yourself". Episodes were shot in Los Angeles. Be Handy Con Carmen airs in 17 countries including the U.S., Canada and Mexico and as well as countries in the Caribbean and South America.

De La Paz is also currently working on You Can Do It magazine, an online publication where she simplifies home renovations by breaking them down to the basics. The magazine was launched in Fall 2011.
