= License to Kill (1984 film) =

- Genre: Drama
- Written by: William A. Schwartz
- Directed by: Jud Taylor
- Starring: James Farentino; Penny Fuller
- Music by: Laurence Rosenthal
- Country of origin: United States
- Original language: English

Production
- Executive producer: Marian Rees
- Producer: Dorothea G. Petrie
- Production location: Dallas
- Cinematography: Robert C. Jessup
- Editor: Paul LaMastra
- Running time: 96 minutes
- Production companies: D. Petrie Productions; Marian Rees Associates

Original release
- Network: CBS
- Release: January 10, 1984

License to Kill is a 1984 television film directed by Jud Taylor. It stars James Farentino and Penny Fuller. It was released on DVD in 2008 by Echo Bridge Home Entertainment.

== Plot ==
John and Judith Peterson's world is shattered when their daughter Lynne is killed by a drunk driver on the same day she graduates from high school and receives an award for safe driving. John becomes obsessed with seeing Tom Fiske, the arrogant businessman who caused the accident and who shows no remorse, punished for his crime. Fiske hires a crafty defense attorney who delays the trial repeatedly and succeeds in having his blood sample showing his inebriation suppressed as evidence. However dogged prosecutor Martin Sawyer prevails by entering into evidence Fiske's bar bill on the day of the accident showing his consumption of martinis as proof of his inebriation. Justice prevails when Fiske is sentenced to prison.

== Production ==
Both Farentino and Murray are said to have swapped roles early on during principal photography.

== Cast ==
- Denzel Washington as Martin Sawyer
- James Farentino as John Peterson
- Penny Fuller as Judith Peterson
- Don Murray as Tom Fiske
- Millie Perkins as Mary Fiske
- Ari Meyers as Amy Peterson
- Kristen Vigard as Lynne Peterson
- George Martin as Steve

== Home media ==
The film was released in Australia as a double feature DVD with Resting Place by Payless Entertainment.
