= John Lithgow =

American actor (born 1945)

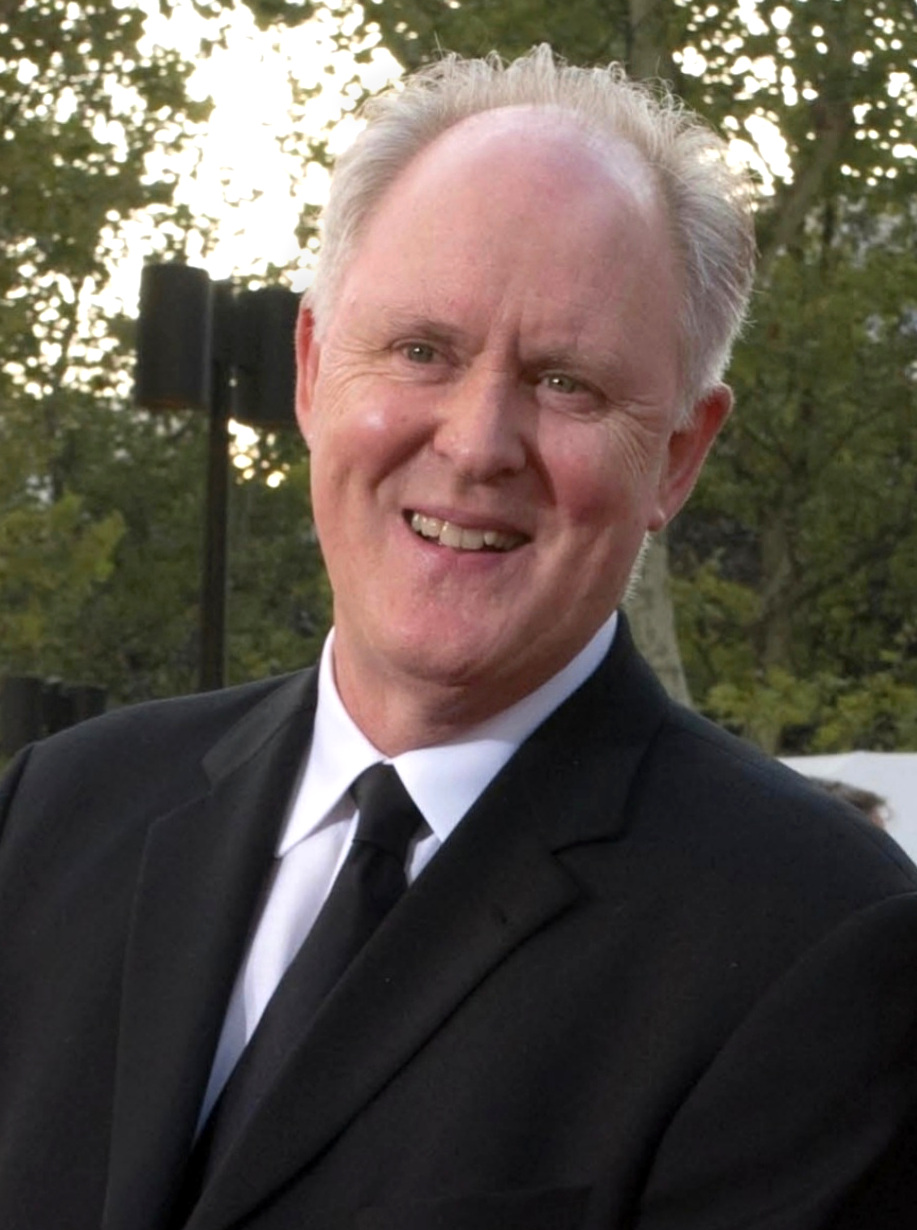
- Lithgow in 2008
- Born: John Arthur Lithgow; October 19, 1945 (age 81); Rochester, New York, U.S.
- Education: Harvard University (BA); London Academy of Music and Dramatic Art
- Occupations: Actor; author; musician; poet
- Years active: 1972–present
- Works: Full list
- Spouses: Jean Taynton (m. 1966; div. 1980); Mary Yeager (m. 1981)
- Children: 3, including Ian
- Father: Arthur Lithgow
- Awards: Full list
- Website: www.johnlithgow.com

John Arthur Lithgow (/ˈlɪθɡoʊ/ LITH-goh; born October 19, 1945) is an American actor. He studied at Harvard University and the London Academy of Music and Dramatic Art before becoming known for his diverse work on stage and screen. He has received numerous accolades including four Actor Awards, seven Emmy Awards, two Golden Globes, a Laurence Olivier Award, and three Tony Awards, as well as nominations for two Academy Awards, a British Academy Television Award and four Grammy Awards.

A three-time Tony Award winner, Lithgow has won in the categories Best Featured Actor in a Play for his Broadway debut portraying a rugby player in The Changing Room (1972), Best Actor in a Musical for playing a fearful columnist in Sweet Smell of Success (2002), and Best Actor in a Play for his portrayal of Roald Dahl in Giant (2026). (Note: He previously played this role in the West End in 2025 earning him the Laurence Olivier Award for Best Actor.) He was Tony-nominated for Requiem for a Heavyweight (1985), M. Butterfly (1988), Dirty Rotten Scoundrels (2005), and The Columnist (2012). He has also acted in A Delicate Balance (2014) and Hillary and Clinton (2019).

On television, Lithgow starred as Dick Solomon in the NBC sitcom 3rd Rock from the Sun (1996–2001), winning three Primetime Emmy Awards for Outstanding Lead Actor in a Comedy Series. He received further Emmy Awards for Outstanding Guest Actor in a Drama Series playing Arthur Mitchell in the drama Dexter (2009) and for Outstanding Supporting Actor in a Drama Series for his portrayal of Winston Churchill in the Netflix drama The Crown (2016–2019). He also starred in the HBO drama series Perry Mason (2020) and the FX thriller series The Old Man (2022–2024).

In film, Lithgow has received two nominations for the Academy Award for Best Supporting Actor for his roles as a transgender ex-football player in The World According to Garp (1982) and as a lonely banker in Terms of Endearment (1983). He also acted in All That Jazz (1979), Blow Out (1981), Footloose (1984), Harry and the Hendersons (1987), A Civil Action (1998), Shrek (2001), Kinsey (2004), Rise of the Planet of the Apes (2011), Love Is Strange (2014), Interstellar (2014), Late Night (2019), Bombshell (2019), Killers of the Flower Moon (2023), and Conclave (2024).

== Early life and education ==
Lithgow was born on October 19, 1945, in Rochester, New York. His mother, Sarah Jane (née Price), was a retired actress. His father, Arthur Lithgow, was a theatrical producer and director who ran McCarter Theatre in Princeton, New Jersey. His father was born in Puerto Plata, Dominican Republic, to a European-American family; his great-grandfather was a vice consul and vice commercial agent in the country. He is the third of four children and his siblings are an older brother David Lithgow, an older sister Robin Lithgow, and a younger sister Sarah Jane Bokaer.

Lithgow is of mostly English and Welsh descent. His maternal grandfather, Orlo Price, as well as other family members, left their native Wales, and settled in a town called Welsh Hills, Ohio, and started fruit farming in the 19th century. On the show Finding Your Roots, Lithgow also discovered that he is a descendant of eight Mayflower passengers, including colonial governor William Bradford. He is also related to that show's host, the historian and literary critic, Henry Louis Gates Jr., in addition to being distant cousins with painter Frederic Edwin Church, chef Julia Child, author Thomas Pynchon, and actors Alec Baldwin, Clint Eastwood, and Sally Field.

Because of his father's job, the family moved frequently during Lithgow's childhood. He spent his childhood years in Yellow Springs, Ohio, where activist Coretta Scott King was his babysitter. He spent his teenage years in Akron (living at Stan Hywet Hall) and Lakewood, Ohio, followed by Princeton, New Jersey.

Lithgow is a 1963 graduate of Princeton High School. He then studied history and English literature at Harvard College. Lithgow lived in Adams House as an undergraduate and later served on the Harvard Board of Overseers. He credits a performance at Harvard of Gilbert and Sullivan's Utopia Limited with helping him decide to become an actor. He was a pupil of dramatist Robert Chapman who was the director of Harvard's Loeb Drama Center. Lithgow was graduated from Harvard in 1967 with an A.B. magna cum laude and was elected to Phi Beta Kappa.

Upon graduation from Harvard, Lithgow won a Fulbright Scholarship to study at the London Academy of Music and Dramatic Art. After graduation from the LAMDA, he served as the director of the Arts and Literature Department at WBAI, the Pacifica radio station in New York City.

== Career ==
=== 1972–1995: Broadway debut and breakthrough ===
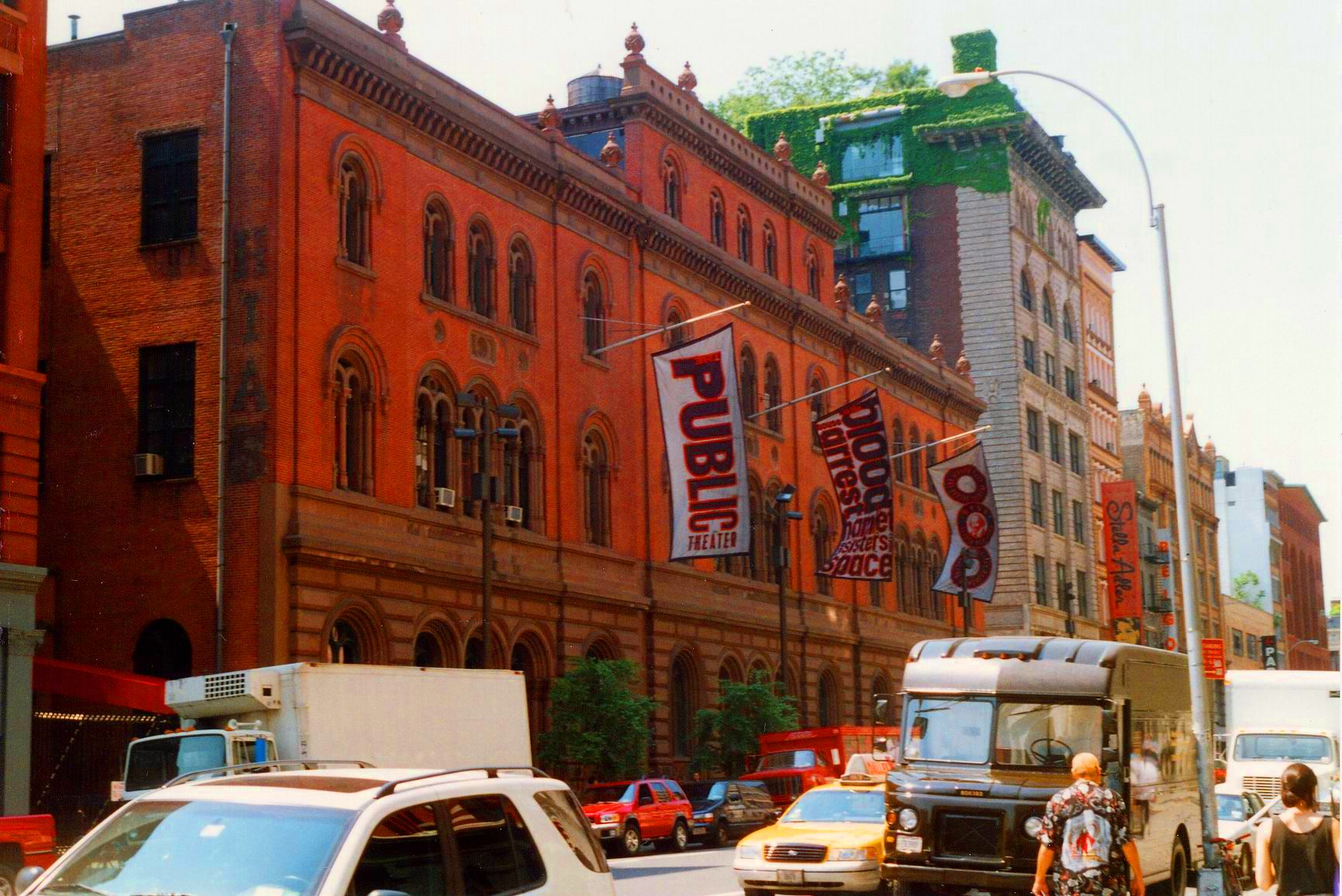
Lithgow has starred in numerous productions at the Public Theatre

In 1972, Lithgow made his film debut in Dealing: Or the Berkeley-to-Boston Forty-Brick Lost-Bag Blues. The same year, he directed a production of The Beaux’ Strategem at Center Stage in Baltimore. In 1976, he starred in a pivotal role in Brian De Palma's Obsession with Cliff Robertson and Genevieve Bujold as Robertson's long time business partner, Robert Lasalle. In 1973, Lithgow debuted on Broadway in David Storey's The Changing Room at the Morosco Theatre, playing English rugby player Kenny Kendal. He won a Drama Desk Award and the Tony Award for Best Featured Actor in a Play. The production ran from March 2 to August 18, totaling 3 previews and 192 performances. The following year, he starred again on Broadway in the comedy play My Fat Friend, opposite Lynn Redgrave at the Brooks Atkinson Theatre. He starred in several plays, such as 27 Wagons Full of Cotton, A Memory of Two Mondays, and Secret Service, with Meryl Streep at The Public Theater and with Tom Hulce at the Playhouse Theatre. Lithgow acted in Bob Fosse's semi-autobiographical movie All That Jazz (1979), playing a character loosely based on real-life Broadway director and choreographer Michael Bennett. Between 1978 and 1980, Lithgow appeared in ten episodes of the radio drama revival series CBS Radio Mystery Theater. Lithgow voiced the character of Yoda in the National Public Radio adaptations of The Empire Strikes Back and Return of the Jedi.

Lithgow was approached about playing Dr. Frasier Crane on Cheers, but turned it down. In 1982, Lithgow was nominated for the Academy Award for Best Supporting Actor for his performances as transsexual ex-football player Roberta Muldoon in The World According to Garp. In 1983, he played lonely small-town banker Sam Burns in Terms of Endearment, receiving his second consecutive Oscar nomination. Both films were screen adaptations of popular novels. In 1983, Lithgow appeared in a remake of the classic Twilight Zone episode "Nightmare at 20,000 Feet" in Twilight Zone: The Movie as the paranoid passenger made famous on the television show by William Shatner. In an interview with Bill Moyers, Lithgow revealed this role as his favorite of his film career. Also in 1983, Lithgow appeared in a minor role as University of Kansas science professor Joe Huxley in the nuclear apocalypse television film The Day After, receiving a nomination for the Primetime Emmy Award for Outstanding Supporting Actor in a Limited or Anthology Series or Movie. In 1984, he starred in the film The Adventures of Buckaroo Banzai Across the 8th Dimension as Dr. Emilio Lizardo / Lord John Whorfin. Also in 1984, he starred in 2010: The Year We Make Contact and played a pastor who condemns dancing and rock music in Footloose.

In 1985, he starred opposite Jodie Foster in Mesmerized. Also in 1985, he starred in Santa Claus: The Movie alongside Dudley Moore. Also in 1985, at the Martin Beck Theatre on Broadway, he starred in Requiem for a Heavyweight, written by Rod Serling. Playing washed-up boxer Harlan "Mountain" McClintock, he won the Drama Desk Award for Outstanding Actor in a Play and was nominated for the Tony Award for Best Actor in a Play. The production ran only 11 performances. In 1986, he was nominated for the Primetime Emmy Award for Outstanding Lead Actor in a Miniseries or a Special for Resting Place, portraying Major Kendall Laird, a charismatic but morally compromised Southern lawman entangled in a long-buried murder. In 1986, he starred in The Manhattan Project, directed by Marshall Brickman. Also in 1986, Lithgow won the Primetime Emmy Award for Outstanding Guest Actor in a Drama Series for his appearance in the episode "The Doll" of the Amazing Stories anthology series. In 1987, Lithgow starred in the Bigfoot-themed family comedy Harry and the Hendersons.

In 1988, he returned to Broadway and starred in David Henry Hwang's M. Butterfly alongside BD Wong, at the Eugene O'Neill Theatre. Playing French diplomat René Gallimard, he won the Drama Desk Award for Outstanding Actor in a Play and was nominated for the Tony Award for Best Actor in a Play. The production ran from March 13 to January 27, 1990, totaling 9 previews and 777 performances.

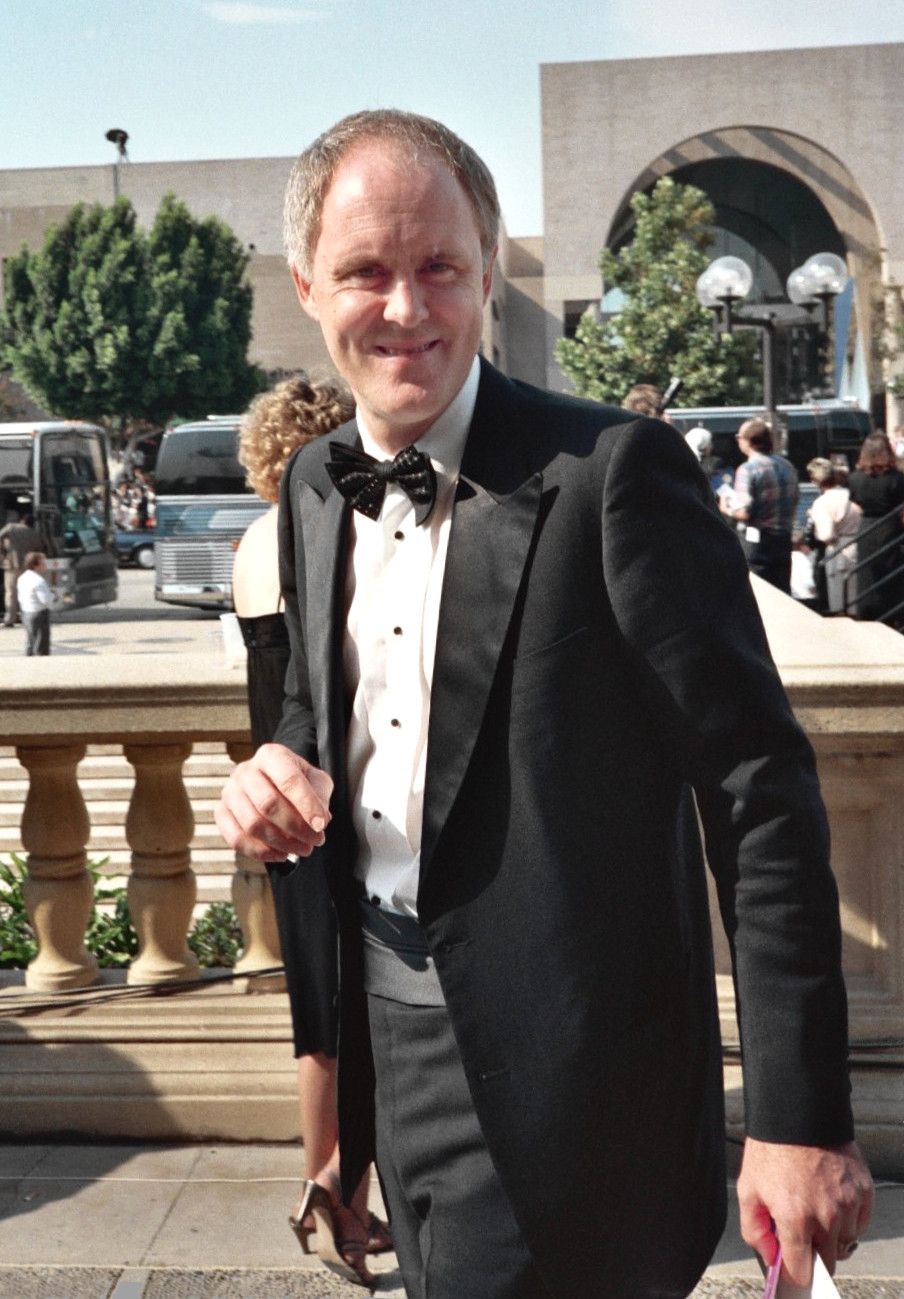
Lithgow at the Primetime Emmy Awards in 1988

In 1991, he starred in the movie Ricochet opposite Denzel Washington as Earl Talbot Blake, a criminal seeking revenge against the policeman who sent him to prison. Also in 1991, he played missionary Leslie Huben in the film adaptation of Peter Matthiessen's novel At Play in the Fields of the Lord. In 1992, he starred as a man with multiple personality disorder in Brian De Palma's film Raising Cain. In 1992, he became the narrator in the Dr. Seuss video Yertle the Turtle and Other Stories. In 1993, he starred in Renny Harlin's film Cliffhanger opposite Sylvester Stallone as terrorist leader Eric Qualen, and he reunited with Washington in Alan J. Pakula's film The Pelican Brief. In 1994, Lithgow played Franklin Delano Roosevelt in the NBC miniseries World War II: When Lions Roared (also known as Then There Were Giants) directed by Joseph Sargent, and starring alongside Michael Caine and Bob Hoskins. In an interview with The Los Angeles Times, Lithgow said that his parents loved Roosevelt and that his mother "burst into tears" when he told her he was playing him. Lithgow wore leg braces to mirror Roosevelt's paralysis after FDR contracted polio and expressed the difficulty of playing a revered historical figure: "People know him and revere him so much, no matter how close you get, you're not only far from the real thing, you are far from people's fantasies of him. But what also makes it's hard, is what makes it fascinating." Variety praised the performances of Lithgow, Caine, and Hoskins, and Paul Mavis admitted Lithgow "does quite well with the character" despite his initial reservations on whether the actor could faithfully portray FDR. In 1995, he was nominated for the Primetime Emmy Award for Outstanding Lead Actor in a Limited or Anthology Series or Movie for My Brother's Keeper, portraying Tom Bradley, an HIV-positive teacher, and Bob Bradley, his twin brother. He provided narration for the IMAX film Special Effects: Anything Can Happen (1996).

=== 1996–2015: Sitcom and theater work ===
In television, Lithgow is widely known for his starring role as Dick Solomon in the 1996–2001 NBC sitcom 3rd Rock from the Sun. He received six consecutive nominations for the Primetime Emmy Award for Outstanding Lead Actor in a Comedy Series and won the award three times (1996, 1997, 1999). His son, Ian, regularly appeared alongside him as Leon, one of his physics students. In 1998, he appeared in the film, A Civil Action, as Judge Walter J. Skinner. Emanuel Levy of Variety wrote that Lithgow was among the film's "standout character performances", and Lithgow and costars James Gandolfini and Sydney Pollack were cited by Janet Maslin of The New York Times as giving "shrewd, first-rate performances". He lent his voice to the character Jean Claude in the 2000 Nickelodeon Movies animated film, Rugrats in Paris: The Movie.

In 2001, Lithgow gained recognition for voicing Lord Farquaad in the Academy Award-winning DreamWorks Animation film Shrek, alongside Mike Myers, Eddie Murphy, and Cameron Diaz. Upon joining the film, Lithgow read his dialogue and was shown a maquette of his character and storyboards. As Shrek experienced delays, Lithgow would return "once every eight months or so to record some new material." He admitted to not thinking the film would be as successful as it ended up being: "I thought it was like a Saturday morning cartoon or something. Not a big deal." Abigail Stevens praised Lithgow and Vincent Cassel as giving "deliciously evil performances", and Elvis Mitchell opined that Lithgow's involvement made the film funnier. Peter Bradshaw compared Lithgow's vocal characterization to being "somewhere between Kelsey Grammer and Alan Rickman."

In 2002, he narrated Life's Greatest Miracle, a documentary about human embryonic development. That same year, Lithgow returned to Broadway portraying powerful NYC gossip columnist J. J. Hunsecker in the adaptation of the 1957 film Sweet Smell of Success, acting alongside Brian d'Arcy James. Lithgow won the Tony Award for Best Actor in a Musical for his performance. In 2005, he starred on Broadway in the musical-comedy Dirty Rotten Scoundrels alongside Norbert Leo Butz at the Imperial Theatre. While both were nominated for the Tony Award for Best Leading Actor in a Musical, Butz won over Lithgow. That same year, Lithgow was elected into the American Theater Hall of Fame for his work on Broadway, as well as for his performances in operas by Verdi and Wagner. In 2004, he portrayed the moralistic, rigid father of Alfred Kinsey in that year's biopic Kinsey, in which Liam Neeson also starred. In 2003, Lithgow wrote the narrations for the Christopher Wheeldon ballet Carnival of the Animals and appeared as the elephant character—nurse Mabel Buntz—with the New York City Ballet. He returned for a 2005 revival, the Houston Ballet production of the same show in 2007, and the Pennsylvania Ballet production of it in 2008.

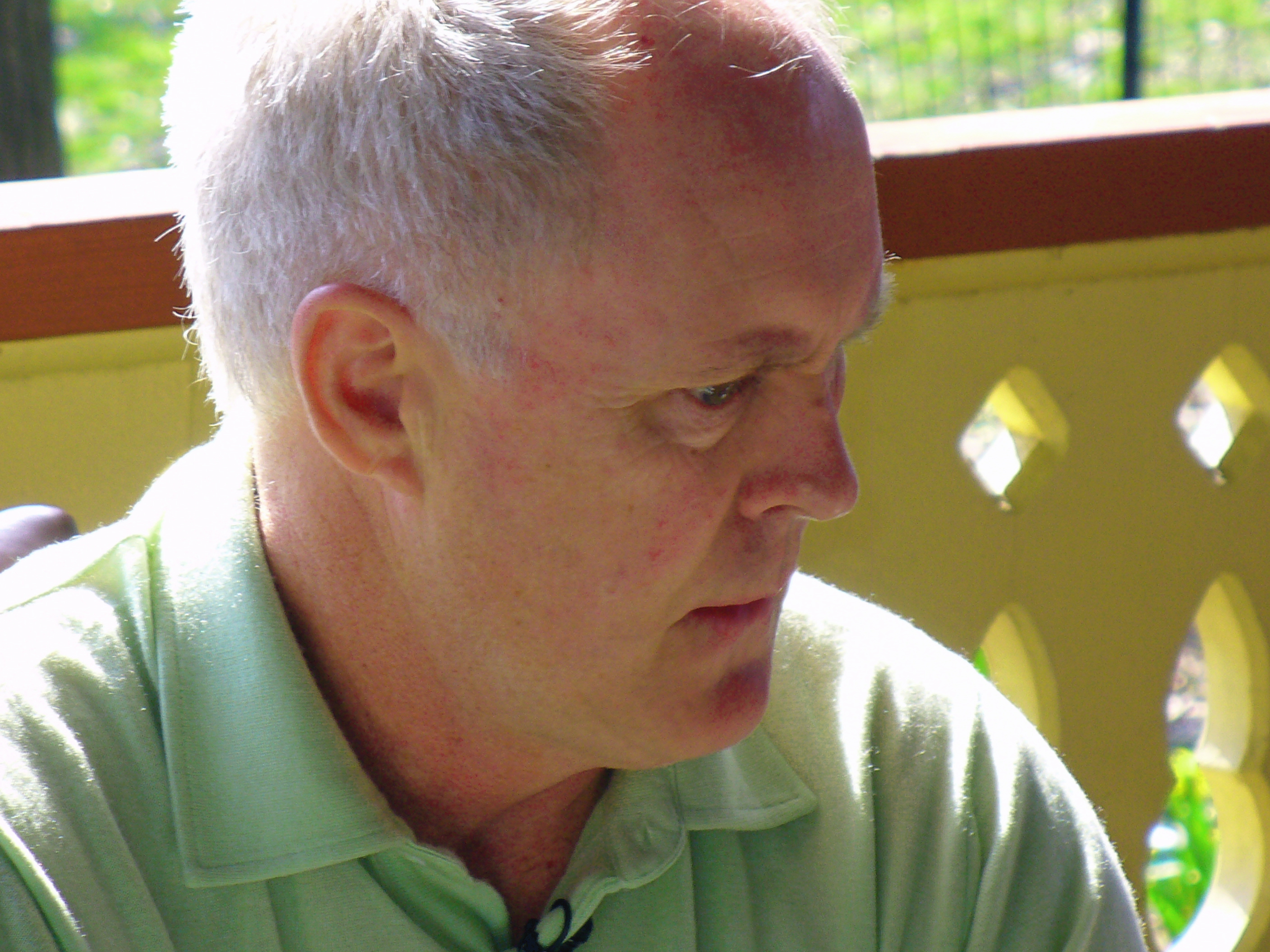
Lithgow in 2007

In 2005, Lithgow became the first ever actor to deliver a commencement speech at Harvard University, his alma mater, and they awarded him an honorary Doctor of Arts. In 2006, Lithgow had a small role in the Academy Award-winning film, Dreamgirls, as Jerry Harris, a film producer offering Deena Jones (Beyoncé Knowles) a film role. Since 2006, he has starred in Progresso commercials, advertising their soup brand.

In 2007, Lithgow played Malvolio in the Royal Shakespeare Company's production of Twelfth Night, at The Courtyard Theatre, Stratford-upon-Avon, in the United Kingdom. He was featured at Heinz Hall in Pittsburgh, Pennsylvania from December 4–6, 2009 for performances of Mozart's Requiem with the Pittsburgh Symphony Orchestra. In certain parts of the performance, he narrated some letters written by Wolfgang Amadeus Mozart, some poems, and sections from the Book of Revelation.

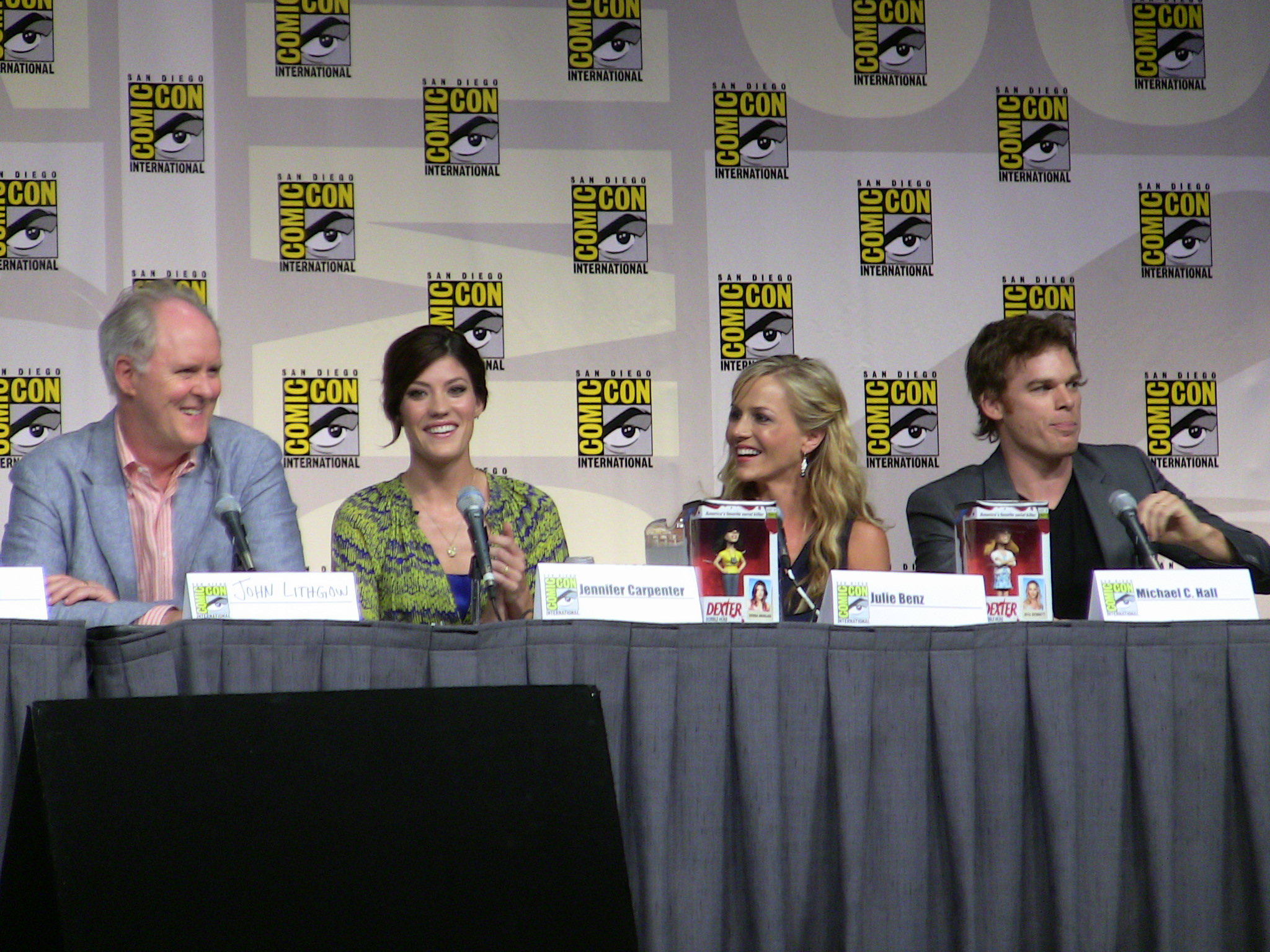
(L-R): John Lithgow, Jennifer Carpenter, Julie Benz, and Michael C. Hall at San Diego Comic-Con in July 2009

Lithgow starred with Jeffrey Tambor in the NBC sitcom Twenty Good Years. On March 5, 2009, Lithgow made a cameo on NBC's 30 Rock acting in the episode "Goodbye, My Friend" with several references to his role in Harry and the Hendersons. In September 2009, Lithgow joined the cast of Dexter as Arthur Mitchell, a serial killer and Dexter Morgan's nemesis. He won a Golden Globe Award for this role and won an Emmy for Outstanding Guest Actor in a Drama Series. He guest starred on How I Met Your Mother in the role of Barney Stinson's father, Jerry. In 2008 through 2009, Lithgow played Joe Keller in a Broadway revival of Arthur Miller's All My Sons directed by Simon McBurney. Lithgow starred alongside Dianne Wiest, Patrick Wilson, and Katie Holmes in her Broadway debut at the Schoenfeld Theatre. He hosted Paloozaville, a children's Video on demand program on Mag Rack based on his bestselling children's books. Lithgow also appears in Books By You, a children's computer game that guides them through the steps to personalize a predesigned book.

In 2010, Lithgow starred in the off-Broadway production of Douglas Carter Beane's comedy, Mr. & Mrs. Fitch, alongside Jennifer Ehle at the Second Stage Theater that ran from February 22, 2010, to April 4, 2010. The same year, he appeared briefly in the romantic comedy, Leap Year, playing Amy Adams' father. On October 1, 2010, Lithgow appeared on Doug Benson's podcast Doug Loves Movies, with fellow guests Paul F. Tompkins and Jimmy Pardo. He appeared on Chris Hardwick's show The Nerdist Podcast in 2012 and the WTF with Marc Maron podcast in 2019. In September 2011, Lithgow was featured in a one-night-only production of Dustin Lance Black's play 8, a staged reenactment of the federal trial that overturned California's Proposition 8 ban on same-sex marriage—as Attorney Theodore Olson to raise money for the American Foundation for Equal Rights. In 2015, Lithgow did the voiceover work for Gore Vidal in the documentary film Best of Enemies, with Kelsey Grammer.

In 2012, Lithgow returned to Broadway in David Auburn's play The Columnist, which played at the Manhattan Theatre Club. The performance earned him a nomination for the Tony Award for Best Actor in a Play. In the winter of 2012–13, he appeared in the London revival of Arthur Wing Pinero's The Magistrate as Police Magistrate Aeneas Posket at the National Theatre.

In 2014, he returned to Manhattan and Central Park at the Delacorte Theater and Shakespeare in the Park for the 2014 summer season in the title role of Shakespeare's King Lear, directed by Tony Award winner Daniel Sullivan. The production was the first play at the theater since 1973 and Lithgow's first time there since 1975, when he had played Laertes. In fall 2014, Lithgow returned to Broadway as Tobias in a revival of Edward Albee's A Delicate Balance. He starred opposite Glenn Close, Martha Plimpton, Lindsay Duncan, Bob Balaban, and Clare Higgins. Pam MacKinnon directed the limited 18-week production at the John Golden Theatre. Lithgow gained critical attention for starring in Ira Sachs' independent romance film Love Is Strange (2014). The film received a 94% on Rotten Tomatoes, with the consensus reading, "Held aloft by remarkable performances from John Lithgow and Alfred Molina, Love Is Strange serves as a graceful tribute to the beauty of commitment in the face of adversity." The film also received four Film Independent Spirit Award nominations, including for both Lithgow and Molina. Lithgow during the 2010s appeared in Rise of the Planet of the Apes (2011), Jay Roach's The Campaign (2012), Judd Apatow's This Is 40 (2012), Christopher Nolan's Interstellar (2014), and Tommy Lee Jones' The Homesman (2014). In 2015, Lithgow made a cameo on Louis C.K.'s Louie in the season-five episode "Sleepover" alongside Glenn Close, Michael Cera, and Matthew Broderick.

=== 2016–2019: The Crown and other roles ===
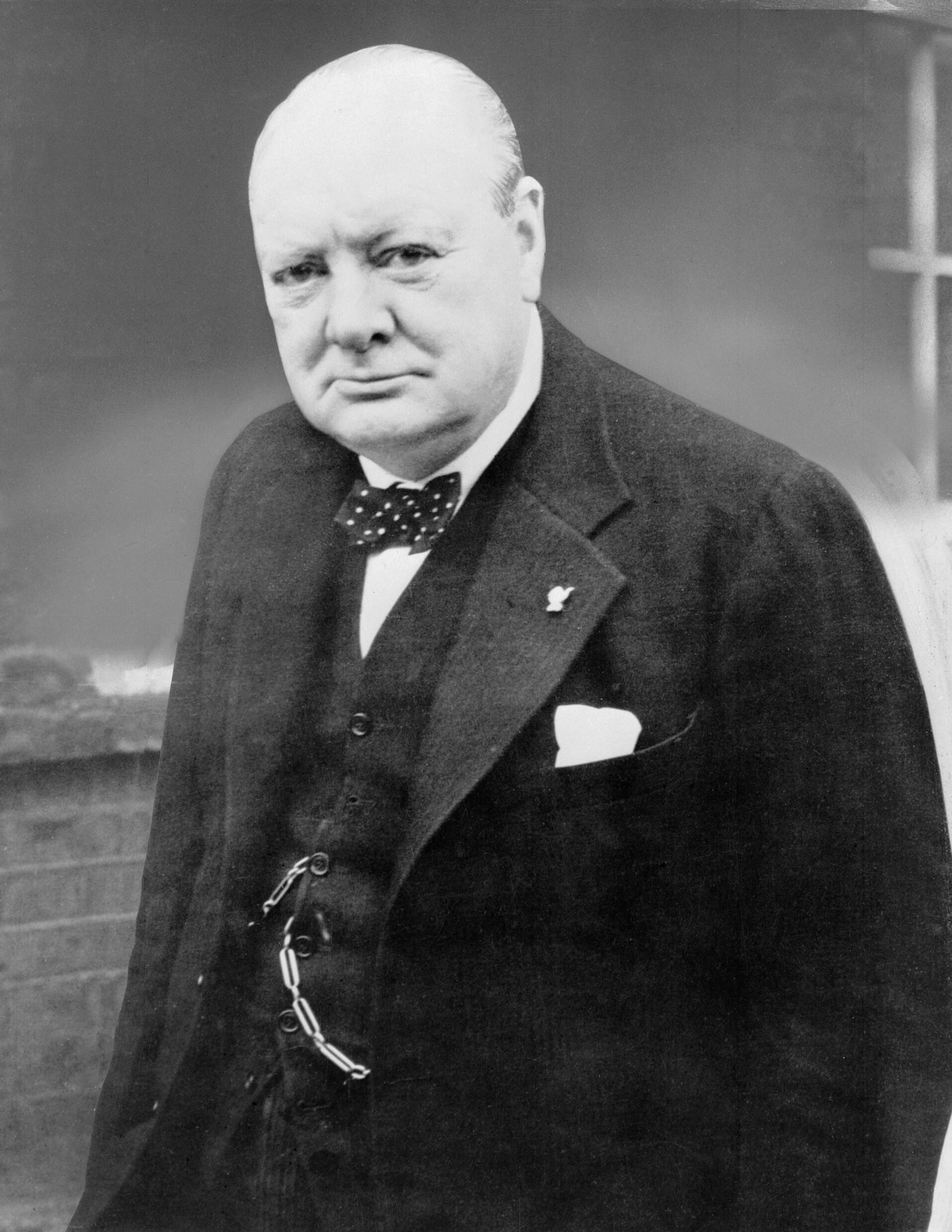
Lithgow portrayed Winston Churchill, shown above, in the Netflix television series, The Crown

In 2016, Lithgow appeared in the first season of The Crown (2016) portraying Winston Churchill. Lithgow had no hesitation in taking the role and his research included reading and viewing archival footage of Churchill, reflecting that he did not believe "I've ever prepared for any role quite as much as this." Lithgow spent two days fitting the fatsuit, wearing a wig to appear balder and mouth plumpers to swell his jowls to further mimic Churchill's manner of speaking. Caroline Siede opined in The A.V. Club that Lithgow "offers his most layered performance to date on this show" as he embraced both the comical sides of Churchill and demonstrated his vulnerability. Lithgow won numerous awards for his performance, including the Primetime Emmy Award and the Screen Actors Guild Award.

On October 18, 2017, Lithgow coauthored the New York Times daily crossword puzzle. Lithgow starred in the independent film Beatriz at Dinner (2017). Lithgow starred in the solo play John Lithgow: Stories by Heart, which opened on Broadway on January 11, 2018, at the American Airlines Theatre, written by Lithgow. Lithgow acted in the play around the U.S., starting at the Lincoln Center Theater with Willie Nelson in 2008, with a return performance at Lincoln Center for April to May 2019. During this time, he also acted in Gavin O'Connor's The Accountant, John Madden's Miss Sloane (2016), Sean Anders's Daddy's Home 2 (2017), Trish Sie's Pitch Perfect 3 (2017), and Pet Sematary (2019).

In 2017, Lithgow starred in the first season of Trial & Error as a professor who becomes implicated in the murder of his wife. In 2018, Lithgow was one of the actors who voiced the audiobook of A Day in the Life of Marlon Bundo. In 2019, Lithgow performed in Emily Chadwick Weiss's audio play If You Win, released by Playing on Air in spring 2020. Lithgow starred as Bill Clinton opposite Laurie Metcalf as Hillary Clinton in the Lucas Hnath play Hillary and Clinton, on Broadway at the John Golden Theatre. The play opened on April 18, 2019, and closed on June 23, 2019. In 2019, Lithgow co-starred in Mindy Kaling's comedy Late Night. The film premiered at the Sundance Film Festival and was released on June 7, 2019. The same year, he portrayed Fox News CEO Roger Ailes in the film Bombshell, which starred Charlize Theron, Margot Robbie, and Nicole Kidman. Lithgow said he was "telling a story that needs to be told" and that the intention behind his Ailes portrayal was "to trouble people, unsettle people with the fact that they shouldn't have sympathy for the devil." Kristy Puchko of IGN praised Lithgow as giving "a glowering menace".

=== 2020–present: Giant and expansion ===
In 2020, Lithgow portrayed the attorney Elias Birchard "E.B." Jonathan in season one of the HBO reboot of Perry Mason. In the story, Mr. Birchard starts out as the employer of Mason, who is his investigator. On June 28, 2021, Showtime confirmed that Lithgow would reprise his role of Arthur Mitchell in the ten-episode Dexter limited series, with Clyde Phillips returning as the head writer. The series premiered on November 7, 2021. In 2022, Lithgow portrayed former FBI Assistant Director Harold Harper in the Hulu series The Old Man, opposite Jeff Bridges. Lithgow was drawn to the show for the opportunity to work with Bridges, calling him "a wonderful actor" and found the plot "to be an extremely unusual story" only comparable to Grumpy Old Men. Mike Hale credited Lithgow with giving "an expertly entertaining performance as Chase’s primary nemesis", and Dave Nemetz of TVLine praised Lithgow and Bridges with making "a formidable cat-and-mouse duo, in the vein of The Fugitive's Harrison Ford and Tommy Lee Jones." For his performance, he was nominated for the Golden Globe Award for Best Supporting Actor – Series, Miniseries or Television Film.

In 2022, Lithgow presented Liv Ullmann with the Academy Honorary Award at the Governors Awards. In 2023, Lithgow played Peter Leaward in Martin Scorsese's Killers of the Flower Moon. The film co-starred Leonardo DiCaprio, Lily Gladstone, and Robert De Niro, and it received ten Academy Award nominations, including for Best Picture.

In 2024 Lithgow starred in the conspiracy thriller Conclave, directed by Edward Berger. The film revolves around a fictional story about cardinals who are tasked in finding a successor to a deceased Pope. Lithgow starred opposite Ralph Fiennes, Stanley Tucci, and Isabella Rossellini. In an interview, Lithgow said the film "resonates so much with our historical moment, even though it's about this very esoteric, hidden and misunderstood cabal of secret people." Kristy Puchko of Mashable called his performance "intriguingly slippery". Lithgow next appeared in the psychological horror The Rule of Jenny Pen (2024). Peter Bradshaw observed that Lithgow played his character with "true hideousness". While Alison Foreman of IndieWire praised Lithgow, she lamented that his character's "overwritten origin story means not even the legendary actor can make up the scads of solo brooding sessions this bloated effort would be better without." Also in 2024, he participated in the Netflix-released animated movie Spellbound, with Rachel Zegler, Nicole Kidman, Javier Bardem, and Nathan Lane.

In September 2024, Lithgow portrayed Roald Dahl in the West End production of the Mark Rosenblatt play Giant at the Royal Court Theatre. Arifa Akbar of The Guardian described his performance as "fabulous", adding that he bore an "uncanny resemblance to the writer". For his performance, he received the Laurence Olivier Award for Best Actor.

On February 25, 2025, Lithgow confirmed previous reports that he would play Dumbledore in the HBO Harry Potter series.

Lithgow starred alongside Olivia Colman in the 2025 film Jimpa, directed by Australian director Sophie Hyde and filmed in South Australia, Amsterdam, and Helsinki. He played gay rights and HIV/AIDS activist Jim Hyde, father of the director, in the film, which was released in US and Australian cinemas in early 2026 after premiering at Sundance on January 23, 2025.

== Other work ==
=== Works for children ===
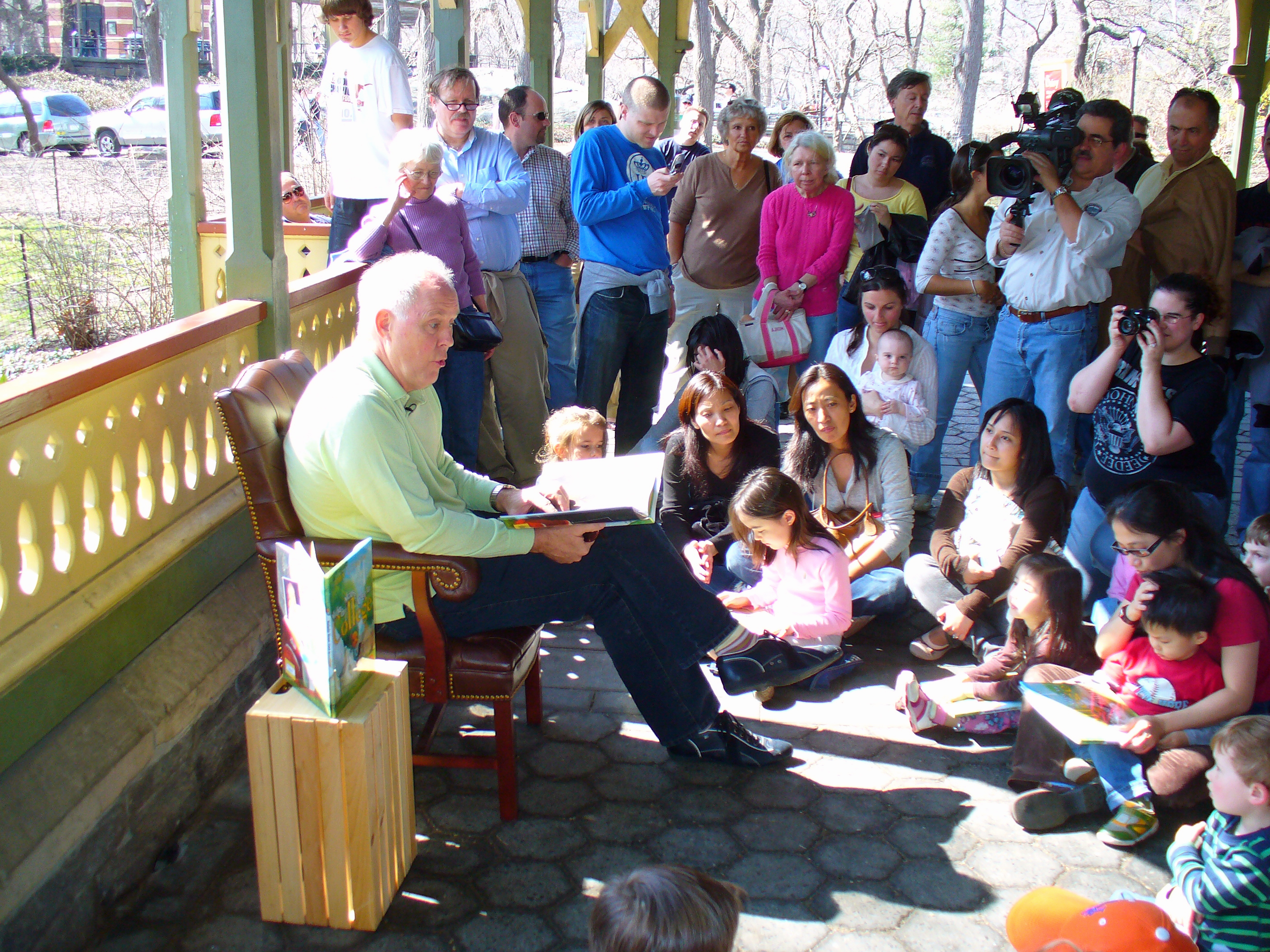
Lithgow reading a book to children in 2007

Lithgow has done extensive work for children, including several books and albums. While he was the conductor of the orchestra of Brahms Hungarian Dance Ballet and Tchaikovsky's The Nutcracker, he took children to some of the performances. The titles of his books for children include, Marsupial Sue, Marsupial Sue Presents "The Runaway Pancake", Lithgow Party Paloozas!: 52 Unexpected Ways to Make a Birthday, Holiday, or Any Day a Celebration for Kids, Carnival of the Animals, A Lithgow Palooza: 101 Ways to Entertain and Inspire Your Kids, I'm a Manatee, Micawber, The Remarkable Farkle McBride, Mahalia Mouse Goes to College, and I Got Two Dogs. He also appeared as a guest on Ants in Your Pants, a Canadian program for children.

Lithgow launched into a career as a recording artist with Singin' in the Bathtub, a 1999 album of music for children. In June 2002, Lithgow released his second album for children Farkle and Friends; however, Waylon Jennings died four months before its release, and it was dedicated to his memory. It was the musical companion to his book, The Remarkable Farkle McBride, which tells the story of a young musical genius. Farkle and Friends features the vocal talents of Lithgow and Bebe Neuwirth, backed by the Bill Elliott Swing Orchestra, as well.

In August 2006, Lithgow released a Franz Schubert tribute album, The Sunny Side of the Street, his third album for children and first with Razor & Tie. This album features versions of classic songs from the Great American Songbook, including "Getting to Know You" and "Ya Gotta Have Pep". Produced by J. C. Hopkins, the album features guest appearances by Madeleine Peyroux, Wayne Knight, Sherie Rene Scott, and Maude Maggart. Lithgow also makes occasional appearances on stage and television singing songs for children, accompanying himself on guitar.

=== Satirical works and political portrayals ===
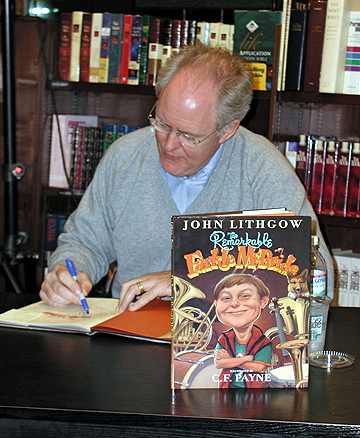
Lithgow autographing copies of The Remarkable Farkle McBride

In June 2019, Lithgow portrayed Donald Trump in The Investigation: A Search for the Truth in Ten Acts, a live reading of special counsel Robert Mueller's report on Trump's 2016 presidential campaign. Staged on the altar of New York City's Riverside Church in Manhattan, the reading was created by playwright Robert Schenkkan and narrated by Annette Bening. The production featured Kevin Kline as Mueller, Joel Grey as Jeff Sessions, Jason Alexander as Chris Christie, and Alfre Woodard as Hope Hicks. He also portrayed Rudy Giuliani in a series of skits on The Late Show with Stephen Colbert.

In October 2019, Lithgow published Dumpty: The Age of Trump in Verse, a book of poems and illustrations. The project originated when Lithgow was asked to perform a Gilbert and Sullivan–style song he wrote about Michael Flynn. The book charted at number three on The New York Times hardcover nonfiction bestsellers in its first week.

A follow-up book entitled Trumpty Dumpty Wanted a Crown was released on September 29, 2020, by Chronicle Books. Lithgow contributed voiceover work for the audio book version of A Day in the Life of Marlon Bundo, a 2018 children's book written by Jill Twiss, a comedy writer for HBO's television show Last Week Tonight with John Oliver. The book is a loose parody of Marlon Bundo's A Day in the Life of the Vice President, a children's book written by Charlotte Pence, the daughter of then–Vice President of the United States Mike Pence, and illustrated by her mother, Karen Pence.

== Personal life ==
Lithgow married Jean Taynton, a teacher, in 1966. They had one son together, Ian Lithgow. The couple separated following an affair he had with actress Liv Ullmann; Lithgow and Taynton divorced in 1980. Lithgow subsequently married UCLA history professor Mary Yeager, with whom he has a son and daughter.

== Acting credits and accolades ==
Lithgow has received three Tony Awards, seven Emmy Awards, two Golden Globes, three Actor Awards, an American Comedy Award, a Laurence Olivier Award, four Drama Desk Awards, and he has been nominated for two Academy Awards and four Grammy Awards. Lithgow has received a star on the Hollywood Walk of Fame and he was inducted into the American Theater Hall of Fame.

Lithgow was elected to the American Philosophical Society in 2019.

== Discography ==
- Singin' in the Bathtub (1999, Sony Wonder)
- Farkle & Friends (2002, Kid Rhino)
- The Sunny Side of the Street (2006, Razor & Tie)

== Bibliography ==
- The Remarkable Farkle McBride (2000, Simon & Schuster)
- Marsupial Sue (2001, Simon & Schuster)
- Micawber (2002, Simon & Schuster)
- I'm a Manatee (2003, Simon & Schuster)
- A Lithgow Palooza (2004, Simon & Schuster)
- Carnival of the Animals (2004, Simon & Schuster)
- Lithgow Party Paloozas!: 52 Unexpected Ways to Make a Birthday, Holiday, or Any Day a Celebration for Kids (2005, Simon & Schuster)
- Lithgow Paloozas!: Boredom Blasters (2005, Running Press)
- Marsupial Sue Presents "The Runaway Pancake" (2005, Simon & Schuster)
- Mahalia Mouse Goes to College (2007, Simon & Schuster)
- I Got Two Dogs (2008, Simon & Schuster)
- Dumpty: The Age of Trump in Verse (2019, Chronicle Prism)
- Trumpty Dumpty Wanted a Crown: Verses for a Despotic Age (2020, Chronicle Books)
- A Confederacy of Dumptys: Portrait of American Scoundrels In Verse (2021, Chronicle Books)

== See also ==
- List of actors with Academy Award nominations
- List of actors with more than one Academy Award nomination in the acting categories
- List of Primetime Emmy Award winners
- List of Golden Globe winners
