= Michael Rudman =

American theatre director (1939–2023)

- Born: 14 February 1939; Tyler, Texas, US
- Died: 30 March 2023 (aged 84)
- Spouse(s): Veronica Bennett (divorced) Felicity Kendal (m. 1983; div. 1990)
- Partner: Felicity Kendal (1998–2023)
- Children: 3

Michael Rudman (February 14, 1939 – March 30, 2023) was an American theatre director who lived and worked primarily in England.

== Early life and education ==
Rudman was born in Tyler, Texas, on February 14, 1939. He graduated from St. Mark's School of Texas in 1956, and four years later, graduated cum laude from Oberlin College with a degree in government. In 1964, he received an MA in English Language and Literature at St Edmund Hall, Oxford; while a student there, he was President of the Oxford University Dramatic Society.

== Career ==
Rudman's career began at the Nottingham Playhouse in 1964, where he was an assistant director and, later, associate producer. He went on to become director of the Traverse Theatre in Edinburgh from 1970 to 1973, after which he took up the post of artistic director at Hampstead Theatre. While he was at Hampstead, the theatre won the Evening Standard Award for Outstanding Achievement. Also at Hampstead, Rudman oversaw the premiere of The Elephant Man by Bernard Pomerance (co-produced with Foco Novo Theatre Company) and is credited with convincing Pomerance to change the play's name from Deformed to The Elephant Man after a dismal preview tour.

In the U. S. Rudman directed the American premiere of The Changing Room by David Storey in 1973. It opened at Long Wharf Theatre, then transferred to the Morosco on Broadway. In Clive Barnes' laudatory review for The New York Times, he writes "It would be very difficult to detect that this is an American production." The play's single setting is a Rugby League Team's locker room in the North of England. The Changing Room won four Drama Desk awards, including Outstanding Director for Rudman. John Lithgow won a Tony for Best Featured Actor in a Play. Eventually Rudman would go on to direct two more plays on Broadway. His production of Death of a Salesman with Dustin Hoffman and John Malkovich at the Broadhurst Theatre won a Tony Award for Best Revival. Hamlet starring Sam Waterston and featuring Jane Alexander and Mandy Patinkin was produced by Lincoln Center in 1975 and also played in a free performance in Central Park produced by New York Shakespeare Festival and Joseph Papp.

In 1978, he was invited to join the National Theatre by Peter Hall and was director of the Lyttelton Theatre from 1979 to 1982. He continued there as an associate director until 1988, after which he went to Chichester Festival Theatre as the director for the 1990 season. From 1992 to 1994, he was artistic director of Crucible Theatre in Sheffield.

== Personal life and death ==
Rudman was Jewish. With his first wife Veronica Bennett, Rudman had two daughters. He was later married to Felicity Kendal from 1983 to 1991. They had one son together. They parted in 1991, divorced in 1994, but from 1998 the partnership between them resumed.

Rudman died on 30 March 2023, at the age of 84.

== Notable productions ==
=== Director ===
- 2017: All My Sons by Arthur Miller for the Hong Kong Arts Festival.
- 2016: All My Sons by Arthur Miller at The Rose Theatre in Kingston with Penny Downie, David Horovitch & Alexander Waldmann.
- 2013: Chin Chin, for Bill Kenwright Productions. Writer François Billetdoux, from a version by Willis Hall. With Simon Callow & Felicity Kendal.
- 2011: The Old Masters, Long Wharf Theatre, New Haven, Connecticut. Writer Simon Gray. With Shirley Knight, Brian Murray & Sam Waterston.
- 2010: Mrs. Warren's Profession, Comedy Theatre, London. Writer George Bernard Shaw. With Max Bennett, Lucy Briggs-Owen, Felicity Kendal & David Yelland.
- 2009: Berlin Hanover Express, Hampstead Theatre, London. Writer Ian Kennedy Martin. With Sean Campion, Isla Carter, Owen McDonnell & Peter Moreton.
- 2006: A Man for All Seasons, Theatre Royal Haymarket, London. Writer Robert Bolt. With Clive Carter, Alison Fiske & Martin Shaw.
- 2006: Present Laughter, Theatre Royal, Bath. Writer Noël Coward. With Simon Callow, Tilly Tremayne & Jessica Turner.
- 2000: Fallen Angels, Globe Theatre, London. Writer Noël Coward. With Frances de la Tour & Felicity Kendal.
- 1997: Our Betters, Chichester Festival Theatre. Writer W. Somerset Maugham. With Charles Edwards & Kathleen Turner.
- 1997: The Admirable Crichton, Chichester Festival Theatre. Writer J. M. Barrie. With Michael Denison, Barbara Jefford & Ian McShane.
- 1997: The Heiress, Gate Theatre, Dublin. Writer Ruth and Augustus Goetz. With Donna Dent.
- 1996: Mansfield Park, Chichester Festival Theatre. Writer Willis Hall (an adaptation of Jane Austenʼs novel). With Tony Britton, Liza Goddard & Lucy Scott.
- 1993: Measure for Measure, New York Shakespeare Festival. Writer William Shakespeare. With Andre Braugher & Kevin Kline.
- 1992: A Midsummer Night's Dream, Sheffield Crucible Theatre. Writer William Shakespeare. With Alex Kingston and Anthony Brown.
- 1992: Making It Better, Criterion Theatre, London. Writer James Saunders. With Jane Asher, David de Keyser, Larry Lamb & Rufus Sewell.
- 1990: Eurydice, Chichester Festival Theatre. Writer Jean Anouilh.
- 1990: Merry Wives of Windsor, Chichester Festival Theatre. Writer William Shakespeare. With Barbara Ferris, Penelope Keith, Phyllida Law & Bill Maynard.
- 1990: Rumours, Chichester Festival Theatre. Writer Neil Simon. With Polly Adams, John Quayle, Alison Fiske, Una Stubbs & Simon Ward.
- 1990: The Wizard of Oz, Chichester Festival Theatre. Writer L. Frank Baum. With Joanna Riding.
- 1987: Father and Sons, National Theatre, London. Writer Brian Friel. With Alec McCowen, Richard Pasco, Ralph Fiennes, Robert Glenister, Barbara Jefford & Robin Bailey.
- 1987: Six Characters in Search of an Author, National Theatre, London. Writer Luigi Pirandello. With Robin Bailey, Ralph Fiennes, Barbara Jefford & Richard Pasco.
- 1987: Waiting for Godot, National Theatre, London. Writer Samuel Beckett. With Alec McCowen.
- 1986: Brighton Beach Memoirs, National Theatre, Lyttelton, London. Writer Neil Simon. With Frances de la Tour, Stephen MacIntosh & Harry Towb.
- 1986: The Magistrate, National Theatre, London. Writer Arthur Wing Pinero. With Nigel Hawthorne & Ken Stott.
- 1984: Death of a Salesman, Broadhurst Theatre, New York. Writer Arthur Miller. With Dustin Hoffman & John Malkovich.
- 1981: Measure for Measure, National Theatre, London. Writer William Shakespeare. With Norman Beaton & Peter Straker.
- 1981: The Second Mrs Tanqueray, National Theatre, London. Writer Arthur Wing Pinero. With Harold Innocent & Felicity Kendal.
- 1980: Harlequinade, National Theatre, Lyttelton, London. Writer Terence Rattigan. With Nicky Henson, Geraldine McEwan & Alec McCowen.
- 1980: The Browning Version, National Theatre, Lyttelton, London. Writer Terence Rattigan. With Geraldine McEwan & Alec McCowen.
- 1980: Thee and Me, National Theatre, Lyttelton, London. Writer Philip Martin. With Gillian Barge, Leonard Maguire & Ian Hogg.
- 1979: Death of a Salesman, National Theatre, Lyttelton, London. Writer Arthur Miller. With Stephen Greif, Doreen Mantle & Warren Mitchell.
- 1979: Gloo Joo, Criterion Theatre, London. Writer Michael Hastings. With Akosua Busia, Anthony Brown, Dave Hill & Oscar James.
- 1979: For Services Rendered, National Theatre, London. Writer W. Somerset Maugham. With Robin Bailey, Alison Fiske, Ian Hogg & Peter Jeffrey.
- 1979: Taking Steps, Lyric Theatre, Hammersmith, London. Writer Alan Ayckbourn. With Dinsdale Landen, Michael Maloney & Nicola Pagett.
- 1979: Clouds, The Duke of York Theatre, London. Writer Michael Frayn. With Paul Chapman, Tom Courtenay & Felicity Kendal.
- 1978: Beyond a Joke (revue), The Hampstead Theatre, London. Writer Rowan Atkinson With Rowan Atkinson.
- 1978: Gloo Joo, The Hampstead Theatre, London. Writer Michael Hastings. With Antony Brown, Dave Hill & Oscar James.
- 1977: Clouds, The Hampstead Theatre, London. Writer Michael Frayn. With Nigel Hawthorne & Barbara Ferris.
- 1976: Donkey's Years, Globe Theatre, London. Writer Michael Frayn. With Peter Barkworth, Peter Jeffrey & Penelope Keith.
- 1975: Alphabetical Order, The Hampstead Theatre, London. Writer Michael Frayn. With Dinsdale Landen & Billie Whitelaw.
- 1975: Hamlet, The Vivian Beaumont Theater, The Lincoln Centre, Broadway. Writer William Shakespeare. With Sam Waterston & Maureen Anderman.
- 1973: The Changing Room, Morosco Theatre, New York. Writer David Storey. With Tom Atkins, George Hearn, John Lithgow, Richard D. Masur & John Tillinger.
- 1973: The Ride Across Lake Constance, Hampstead Theatre, London. Writer Peter Handke. With Nigel Hawthorne, Nicky Henson & Alan Howard.
- 1972: Black and White Minstrels, Traverse Theatre, Edinburgh. Writer Cecil P. Taylor. With Tom Conti & Alan Howard.
- 1972: Carravagio Buddy, Traverse Theatre, Edinburgh. Writer Stanley Eveling. With Ian Holm.
- 1970: Curtains, Traverse Theatre, Edinburgh. Writer Tom Mallin. With Nigel Hawthorne.
- 1969: A Who's Who of Flapland, Traverse Theatre, Edinburgh. Writer David Halliwell. With James Garbutt and Russell Hunter.
- 1969: A Delicate Balance, Citizens Theatre, Glasgow. Writer Edward Albee.
- 1968: Henry IV, Part I, Sheffield Playhouse. Writer William Shakespeare. With David Bradley & Nigel Hawthorne.
- 1966: Long Day's Journey into Night, Nottingham Playhouse. Writer Eugene O'Neill. With Gillian Martell and Robert Ryan.
- 1966: Schweik in the Second World War, Nottingham Playhouse. Writer Bertolt Brecht. With Chris Hancock, Harold Innocent and John Neville.

=== Producer ===
- 1971: A Day With My Sister, Traverse Theatre, Edinburgh. Writer Stephen Poliakoff. Director David Halliwell.
- 1974: Little Ocean, The Hampstead Theatre, London. Writer Sam Shepard. Director Stephen Rea. With O-Lan Jones.
- 1977: Abigail's Party, The Hampstead Theatre, London. Writer and Director Mike Leigh.
- 1977: The Elephant Man, The Hampstead Theatre, London. Writer Bernard Pomerance. Director Roland Rees. With David Schofield Co-produced with Foco-Novo Theatre Company.

=== Playwright ===
- 1983: Short List, Hampstead Theatre, London. Directed by Mike Ockrent. With Bernard Hill & Ian McKellen.
- 1966: Moll Flanders, Nottingham Playhouse.

=== Autobiography ===
- 2014: I Joke Too Much, A Director's Tale, published by Capercaillie Books

== See also ==
- Notable alumni of St. Mark's School of Texas
