= Imaginary Friends (play) =

Play by Nora Ephron

- Original language: English
- Written by: Nora Ephron
- Subject: The decades-long rivalry between Lillian Hellman and Mary McCarthy
- Genre: Comedy-drama

Premiere
- Date: September 21, 2002
- Place: Old Globe Theatre; San Diego

Imaginary Friends is a play by Nora Ephron. It includes songs with music by Marvin Hamlisch and lyrics by Craig Carnelia. This was Ephron's first stage play.

== Plot ==
Writers Lillian Hellman and Mary McCarthy reunite in hell and reflect on their decades-long antagonistic relationship. Dating back to their first meeting at a conference at Sarah Lawrence College in 1948, it came to a head in 1980 when McCarthy, in a television interview with Dick Cavett, asserted, "every word she writes is a lie, including 'and' and 'the'". Hellman subsequently sued McCarthy for slander. As the play progresses, the two women recall, among other things, Hellman's 1952 testimony before the House Un-American Activities Committee; McCarthy's childhood abuse by an uncle; and their romantic involvements: McCarthy with Philip Rahv and Hellman with Dashiell Hammett. Throughout it all, McCarthy accuses Hellman of repeatedly presenting fiction as fact, while Hellman insists McCarthy always portrays fact as fiction.

== Productions ==
Directed by Jack O'Brien, choreographed by Jerry Mitchell, and starring Cherry Jones as McCarthy, Swoosie Kurtz as Hellman, and Harry Groener as all the men in their lives, the play had its world premiere at the Old Globe Theatre in San Diego, where it ran from September 21 through November 3, 2002.

The production transferred to Broadway, opening at the Ethel Barrymore Theatre on December 12, 2002. It closed on February 16, 2003 after 76 performances and 20 previews.

== Critical reception ==
In his CurtainUp review of the San Diego production, Gordon Osmond called it "an uncomfortable cross between vaudeville and conventional musical comedy." He observed, "From its outset Act II shows that the production has been hijacked by Mr. Hamlisch and select members of his troupe of gypsies. The play breaks out into a rash of stand-alone and largely incongruous musical numbers, which seem concocted for the sole purpose of filling up a record album designed perhaps to defray the production's undoubtedly daunting costs . . . [W]e have a desiccated trial scene which didn't happen in life and shouldn't, in its present form, have happened on stage. The finale consists of an off-stage cat fight between the stuffed doll alter egos of Hellman and McCarthy. Having two women of wit, wisdom and letters slug it out physically, albeit offstage, is not just imaginary, it's artistically misguided, pandering to that segment of the audience which doesn't for a moment understand the substance and potential of the play." He concluded, "Imaginary Friends has the feel of a work by a new playwright who was recently quoted as saying that she 'got a taste of the freedom that theater offered . . .' What the playwright failed to recognize is that the theatre has its own rules; e.g., thematic and stylistic consistency."

In his review of the Broadway production, Ben Brantley of The New York Times said it "isn't a show that leaves you gasping at its daring or chuckling over its cleverness. In chronicling a feud between two politically engaged, exceptionally feisty women within a literary world of men, Ms. Ephron makes her points dutifully, clearly and repetitively . . . In trying to appeal to both those who are and those who are not familiar with the play's high-brow heroines, the show winds up sacrificing its dramatic energy to Cliff Notes-like expositions disguised in masquerade costumes . . . Mr. Hamlisch's songs, with lyrics by Craig Carnelia, are tuneful, jinglelike numbers that add little in period flavor or character definition. And some of them simply slow things down to no purpose."

Reviewing for Talkin' Broadway, Matthew Murray noted Nora Ephron "has a thrillingly theatrical concept that she simply hasn't taken to its furthest extremes. This being her first play, that is perhaps understandable, and Imaginary Friends is never incompetent or boring. It does manage to be exciting occasionally, but less often than it should be . . . What Ephron gets right is her depiction of Lillian Hellman and Mary McCarthy as avatars for the diametrically opposed (maybe) deities of 'fiction' and 'fact.' . . . When Imaginary Friends tackles that aspect of the story, presenting its scenes with the flair and creativity only theatre can allow, the play is at its best . . . These moments . . . are theatrically astute and emotionally honest . . . Scenes that give us greater insight into the characters are always the most successful and entertaining." He called the songs "the most puzzling component" of the play, commenting, "While the songs don't slow down or detract from the action, they do not particularly enhance it." He concluded, "What is missing, and would probably have made the show more effective, is the literary music created by McCarthy and Hellman. For the most part, their writings - as lyrical and incisive as one is apt to find - are missing from the play, and the contributions of Hamlisch and Carnelia are a poor substitute. Late in the show, when we're reminded of the real legacy these women leave behind in the impressive volume of material each produced, it becomes all too obvious that Imaginary Friends is weaker for its absence. Given what is present, Nora Ephron could have quite a theatre career ahead of her . . . However, she would be expected to correct her lapses in judgment here in the future; if the addition of the songs was her idea, she should think twice next time and let her characters sing all on their own."

== Awards and nominations ==
Craig Carnelia was nominated for the Drama Desk Award for Outstanding Lyrics but lost to Marc Shaiman and Scott Wittman for Hairspray. The play was also chosen as one of the ten best plays of the 2002-03 New York theatre season by The Best Plays Theatre Yearbook, where critic Charles Wright wrote “Ephron’s characterization captures the tension of women defying expectations when literature was a men’s club and entry appeared—at times—to depend less on talent than on personal association with a man of established position. . . . At a time when deceptive rhetoric permeated the American ether, Ephron offered a play about prevarication and truth-telling in public discourse—and delivered a message of skepticism about the objectivity of “truth” and the credibility of those with easiest access to the media.”
