= Craig Carnelia =

American actor (born 1949)

Craig Carnelia (born August 13th, 1949) is an American musical theater composer and singer. Carnelia has written music and/or lyrics for the broadway musicals Is There Life After High School, Working, Sweet Smell of Success and Imaginary Friends, as well as off-broadway and regional shows including Three Postcards, Cowboys and Lawyers, and Poster Boy.

As a composer and lyricist, Carnelia's accolades include the Johnny Mercer Award, the Gilman and Gonzalez-Falla Award and the Kleban Award. He has also earned three Tony Awards nominations, and two Drama Desk Awards nominations.

== Biography ==
Carnelia grew up in Floral Park, New York. He was exposed to Broadway at the age of fourteen when he was inspired by the Richard Rodgers musical No Strings. He played guitar, was in a folksinging group and taught himself to play the piano. While attending Hofstra University he won the role of The Boy in off-Broadway's The Fantasticks and dropped out of school as a sophomore.

After a short stint in the production, Carnelia pursued songwriting and, later, musical theatre composition. Carnelia has one child, actress Daisy Carnelia, and lives in Springfield, Missouri with his wife, actress Lisa Brescia. His Poster Boy (2016) was performed at the Williamstown Theater Festival in Williamstown, Massachusetts.

Carnelia's songs were heard with the work of other writers in the Stephen Schwartz conceptual revue Working (1978).

From there he wrote full scores, both lyrics and music, for the short-lived Broadway musical Is there life after high school? (1982), which is still performed in stock, amateur, and regional theatres. He composed lyrics and music for Three Postcards, with a book by Craig Lucas, which was staged off-Broadway by Playwrights Horizons in 1987 and revived by Circle Rep in 1994.

For the musical Sweet Smell of Success (2002), he teamed with composer Marvin Hamlisch, with whom he also composed songs for the 2002 Nora Ephron play Imaginary Friends.

He has received the Johnny Mercer Award, "Emerging American Songwriter", the first annual Gilman and Gonzalez-Falla Musical Theater Award, and the Kleban Award. He also is a mentor to young writers through the ASCAP Musical Theatre Workshop, the Dramatists Guild Musical Theatre Fellowship and the Eugene O’Neill Musical Theatre Conference.

== Awards and nominations ==
- 1978 Tony Award Best Original Score Working – Music (nominee)
- 1978 Tony Award Best Original Score Working – Lyrics (nominee)
- 2002 Drama Desk Award Outstanding Lyrics Sweet Smell of Success (nominee)
- 2002 Tony Award Best Original Musical Score – Lyrics Sweet Smell of Success (nominee)
- 2003 Drama Desk Award Outstanding Lyrics Imaginary Friends (nominee)
