= Paloozaville =

Animated/live-action series on Mag Rack

Paloozaville is an animated/live-action series for children and their parents on the Video On Demand network, Mag Rack.

The Mag Rack original series was created exclusively for On Demand and stars John Lithgow as Paloozaville's absent-minded mayor. The show is based on Lithgow's best selling children's books. Every episode begins with a boredom crisis that is subsequently solved by co-host Suza Palooza (Carmen De La Paz) and her team of kids. Every episode has a different theme centering on arts and crafts, music, history, dance, literature, and drama. The series strives to create educational children's entertainment that will allow parents to spend time with their children and learn at the same time.
