= Arthur Lithgow =

American theatre director (1915–2004)

- Born: Arthur Washington Lithgow III; September 9, 1915; Puerto Plata, Dominican Republic
- Died: March 24, 2004 (aged 88); Amherst, Massachusetts, U.S.
- Education: Antioch College (BA)
- Occupations: Actor; director
- Years active: 1935–1984
- Spouse: Sarah Jane Price
- Children: 4, including John
- Relatives: Ian Lithgow (grandson)

Arthur Washington Lithgow III (September 9, 1915 – March 24, 2004) was a Dominican-American actor and director. He helped pioneer the regional theater movement in the United States and founded two Shakespeare festivals. He was the father of the American film and theater actor John Lithgow.

== Early life ==
Lithgow was born in Puerto Plata, the Dominican Republic, the son of Ina Berenice (née Robinson), an American nurse, and Arthur Washington Lithgow II, a Dominican entrepreneur born to Ellen Prentiss Peirce, American, and Arthur Washington Lithgow I, a Dominican businessman and judge of American and Provençal (Southern France) descent, who represented the United States as vice commercial agent and vice consul in Puerto Plata, Dominican Republic. He first appeared onstage in December 1920 at age 5 as a cherub in a Christmas pageant at the Unitarian Church in Melrose, Massachusetts.

== Career ==
He appeared in student productions at Antioch College, where he founded the Antioch Summer Theater in 1935 and where he received his BA in 1938. He made his New York City debut in November 1938, as a soldier in Jacques Deval's anti-Nazi drama, Lorelei.

A nomad all his life, Lithgow was in Rochester, New York near the end of World War II, where he appeared in amateur productions such as the glib cockney scoundrel in an amateur production of the English comic melodrama Ladies in Retirement, produced by the Rochester Community Players.

Lithgow received his MA from Cornell University on playwriting in 1948 and served as assistant professor of dramatics at Antioch from 1947 to 1956. In summer 1951 he was associate producer of the Shaw Festival at the Rice Playhouse on Martha's Vineyard, where he performed in several plays by George Bernard Shaw.

He first began directing Shakespeare at Antioch College in 1952, when he became the Founder and Artistic Director of the Antioch Shakespeare Festival, or "Shakespeare under the Stars," as it came to be known. Within a period of six years, this festival produced all of the works of Shakespeare, bringing the attention and praise of even the Queen of the United Kingdom. Set on an elaborate, multilevel stage behind Antioch's Main Building, the festival attracted during its five-year run a total attendance of over 135,000. Directing and acting in many of these productions, he played Petruchio in The Taming of the Shrew opposite Nancy Marchand's Kate, and also played Stephano, Peter Quince, Dr. Caius and Henry IV. In 1956, the festival partnered with the Toledo Zoo and works were presented outdoors at Antioch and at the zoo.

After leaving Antioch, Lithgow went to Oak Bluffs, Massachusetts; Waterville, Ohio; and Stockbridge, Massachusetts. In 1958, he moved to Northern Ohio as Executive Director of Stan Hywet Hall in Akron, Ohio. He produced a summer Shakespeare festival in 1960, but was fired from Stan Hywet in May 1961. Having already scheduled a second summer Shakespeare season in 1961, he produced the festival at the Ohio Theater in Cuyahoga Falls.

In the summer of 1962, he founded the Great Lakes Shakespeare Festival in Lakewood, Ohio (today known as the "Great Lakes Theater").

He appeared on Broadway in A Cure for Matrimony, Steel and the musical Lorelei (which starred Carol Channing and was based on Gentlemen Prefer Blondes).

In 1963, he became executive director of the McCarter Theatre at Princeton University, a position he held until 1972, when he and his family relocated to Boston, where he was a visiting professor at the University of Massachusetts Boston. He served as administrative director of the Brattleboro Center for the Performing Arts in Brattleboro, Vermont. In 1976, he became a Visiting Associate Professor of the Theatre Arts at the University of South Florida at Tampa. While there he began directing the Alice People Theatre. He returned to Antioch College to direct two summer Shakespeare festivals in 1981 and 1982. At Antioch in 1981, he directed the rarely produced complete versions of all three parts of Shakespeare's Henry VI, performed over three nights.

From 1982 to 1984 he taught at Sinclair Community College in Dayton, Ohio. In Ithaca, New York, he co-founded the Ithaca Theater Guild along with former Cornell University classmate Edward Kamarck.

== Personal life ==
Lithgow married actress Sarah Jane Price in 1939. They had four children, including John, who is an Emmy- and Tony-winning actor.

== Death ==
Lithgow died of heart failure at age 88 in Amherst, Massachusetts.
