= Resting Place =

- DVD cover
- Genre: Drama
- Written by: Walter Halsey Davis
- Directed by: John Korty
- Starring: John Lithgow; Morgan Freeman; CCH Pounder; Frances Sternhagen; G. D. Spradlin
- Music by: Paul Chihara
- Country of origin: United States
- Original language: English

Production
- Executive producer: Marian Rees
- Producer: Robert Huddleston
- Production location: Covington, Georgia
- Cinematography: William Wages
- Editors: Bonnie Koehler; Laurel Ladevich
- Running time: 87 minutes
- Production companies: Hallmark Hall of Fame Productions; Marian Rees Associates, Inc.

Original release
- Network: CBS
- Release: April 27, 1986

Resting Place is an American TV movie directed by John Korty, starring John Lithgow, Morgan Freeman, CCH Pounder, Frances Sternhagen and G. D. Spradlin, released in 1986.

== Plot ==
In 1972, Major Kendall Laird as a Survivors Assistance officer, is charged with helping the families of soldiers killed in action for as long as he may be needed. He is escorting the remains of Dwight Johnson, an Army Lieutenant, for delivering them to his parents Luther and Ada at Rockville, Georgia, which he estimates will be a short duty, and one in which he will have nothing really helpful to do. The funeral is prevented from taking place because, despite desegregation being legally in effect for many years, the town still is deeply segregationist, and its authorities refuse the deceased to be interred in the local "for caucasians only" cemetery. They propose Lt. Johnson's burial to take place in the cemetery for Blacks located in the outskirts of the town, notwithstanding his unit has recommended him for the Silver Star.

The Lieutenant's parents refuse to give in, and they are willing to have his son's body kept in their church's safeguard until the town and cemetery's authorities change their minds. Major Laird searches for a way to break the impasse with the help of Eudora McCallister, the lady who sold the Johnsons a plot of her property in the cemetery, and the local newspaper's editor Sam Jennings. This one suggests that telling the Lieutenant's story would effect a change, so the Major starts an informal quest for biographical data. His first interviews with family and acquaintances reveal the young Lt. Johnson was an extraordinary man, but the interviews with the soldiers of his unit suggest there was something wrong in the way the Lieutenant was killed, given that in their telling of the events they keep repeating the same words as if rehearsed, and one of them plainly refuses to talk without legal counsel.

After many attempts and trying several approaches, Major Laird has to draw upon his own dormant self-assurance and authority to force the soldiers to reveal what happened exactly. The death of the Lieutenant resulted from his unit ultimately mistrusting his command abilities because of his race, and their recommendation for the decoration came from their guilt, as the lieutenant died saving their lives.

Finally, as the story comes to light, Lieutenant Dwight Johnson gets the funeral with full military honors he deserved as a decorated war hero, in the grave his parents had chosen for him, not without a final confrontation with the recalcitrant local authorities.

== Cast ==
- John Lithgow as Major Kendall Laird
- Morgan Freeman as Luther Johnson
- C.C.H. Pounder as Ada Johnson
- Frances Sternhagen as Eudora McCallister
- G. D. Spradlin as Sam Jennings
- M. Emmet Walsh as Sergeant "Sarge"
- John Philbin as Bradford Erskine
- Brian Tarantina as Specialist Four Beyer
- Richard Brooks as Booker T. Douglas

== Reception ==
Resting Place obtained two nominations at the 1986 Primetime Emmy Awards, for Outstanding Directing in a Miniseries or a Special (John Korty), and for Outstanding Lead Actor in a Miniseries or a Special (John Lithgow). It was also nominated at the 1987 Artios Awards for Outstanding Achievement in Movie of the Week Casting by the Casting Society of America (Marsha Kleinman). John J. O'Connor from The New York Times, said that "'Resting Place' dissipates some of its potential power by paying too much attention to the fairly predictable Vietnam investigation. But the film, especially that ending, provides more than enough moving moments, thanks to Mr. Korty and his first-rate cast."

== Home media ==
The film was released in Australia as a double feature DVD with License to Kill by Payless Entertainment.
