= The Sunny Side of the Street =

Studio album by John Lithgow
- Released: August 29, 2006 (U.S.)
- Genre: Children
- Label: Razor & Tie

John Lithgow chronology
Singin' in the Bathtub (1999)	The Sunny Side of the Street (2006)

The Sunny Side of the Street is an album recorded by John Lithgow, released in 2006.

== Track listing ==
1. Getting to Know You
2. On The Sunny Side
3. Pick Yourself Up
4. Baby!
5. Be Human
6. Ya Gotta Have Pep
7. Everyone Says I Love You
8. Inka Dinka Doo
9. I Always Say Hello to a Flower
10. The Laughing Policeman
11. Song of the Sewer
12. I'm a Manatee
13. Lullaby in Ragtime
