= Mag Rack =

Video-on-demand television channel

Mag Rack (formerly Lifeskool) was a video on demand (VoD) television channel. Its primary focus provided viewers with informational programs when they want them. These programs ranged from "how-to" programs to other programs that spotlight past and present products.

The service started off as a 24-hour Catholic channel at the request of James Dolan. It soon grew into a multi-show on demand channel. Most of its early shows were based on unconventional topics such as: birdwatching, Catholicism, and healthy living. Soon after, it gravitated towards shows that brought in a larger audience such as cooking instructions, car shows, fitness, and yoga.

In March 2007, Mag Rack was renamed Lifeskool. After eight months, it was rebranded as Mag Rack once again.

The majority of Mag Rack's programming was acquired through other production companies or through syndication.

Mag Rack was part of Rainbow Media Holdings, Inc., a subsidiary of Cablevision. It was acquired by Joe Covey and Matthew Davidge, co-founders of InterActivation, in October 2008. On July 14, 2017, Covey and Davidge sold Mag Rack to Grace Creek Media, which later dissolved the company.

== Programming ==
- 24seven Gamer
- Art of Basketry
- Auto Access
- Aviator's World
- Buff Fitness
- Celebrating Dogs
- Classic Cars
- Cook With the Pros
- Destination: Nature
- Guitar Xpress
- History of Art
- Inside Weddings
- Let's Dance
- Let's Go Garden
- In Living Color
- Katie Brown @ Home
- Living With
- Mag Rack Kids Club
- Mag Rack: Showcase
- Eebee's Adventures
- Mama Gena's School of Womanly Arts
- Maximum Science
- Mission Space
- Motorcycle Freedom
- Paloozaville
- Personal Trainer
- Photography Close Up
- Pilates
- Road Rage
- Shakespeare
- Smart Carb Gourmet
- Steve Schirripa's Hungry
- Tennis Zone
- The Bible & You
- The Pet Shop with Marc Morrone
- Total Ski
- Total Snowboard
- Traveler's Guide
- Turning Tricks with Justin Willman Kredible
- Wild Wheels
- Yoga Retreat
- Your Next Car
