= Miracle of Life =

Miracle of Life may refer to:

== Movies ==
- The Miracle of Life (1926 film), American silent drama film
- The Miracle of Life (1982 film), Swedish TV film about the human reproductive process

== Other media ==
- Miracles of Life, a 2008 autobiography by British writer J. G. Ballard
- "Miracle of Life", a song by Yes on Union
