= Raising Cain =

1992 American film

- Theatrical release poster
- Directed by: Brian De Palma
- Written by: Brian De Palma
- Produced by: Gale Anne Hurd
- Starring: John Lithgow; Lolita Davidovich; Steven Bauer; Frances Sternhagen
- Cinematography: Stephen H. Burum
- Edited by: Robert Dalva; Paul Hirsch; Bonnie Koehler; Peet Gelderblom
- Music by: Pino Donaggio
- Distributed by: Universal Pictures
- Release date: August 7, 1992
- Running time: 88 minutes
- Country: United States
- Language: English
- Budget: $12 million
- Box office: $37.1 million

Raising Cain is a 1992 American psychological horror thriller film written and directed by Brian De Palma, and starring John Lithgow, Lolita Davidovich and Steven Bauer.

== Plot ==
Respected child psychologist Dr. Carter Nix's wife, Jenny, becomes concerned that he is obsessively studying their daughter Amy; he regards her like a scientist tracking the development of his creation. However, Carter himself suffers from multiple personality disorder, as his alternate personalities include violent petty criminal Cain, shy 7-year-old boy Josh, and middle-aged nanny Margo who protects the others at all costs. Carter and Cain are killing young mothers to procure their children, apparently for experiments performed by Carter's father, a child psychologist who lost his license years earlier after performing unethical experiments on children.

Jenny is having an affair with her ex-boyfriend Jack Dante, the widower of a former patient, and she plans to leave Carter for him. When Carter discovers their tryst, Cain takes over and begins leaving subtle clues for the police implicating Jack in the murders. Next, he attempts to kill Jenny by suffocating her and submerging her car in a lake. She escapes, however, and confronts Carter at home. Unable to find Amy, Jenny demands Carter tell her where she is. Carter replies that she is with his father - only for an incredulous Jenny to reply that his father has been dead for years.

The police contact Dr. Lynn Waldheim, who co-wrote a book with Nix Sr. called Raising Cain, about a boy with multiple personality disorder. Nix Sr. had extensive detailed knowledge of Cain's tortured childhood, including taped recordings of their sessions. However, Waldheim was never allowed to meet Cain. She eventually discovered the truth: Nix Sr. dispassionately put his own son through years of severe child abuse to gain firsthand accounts of his traumatic psychological development and study the emerging personalities. Horrified, Waldheim quit the project. Nix Sr. then disappeared, leaving behind a suicide note. After the police make the connection, Carter is apprehended for attempted murder. Waldheim is sent in alone to interrogate him.

During interrogation, Margo and Josh act and speak for Carter. Josh recites a rhyme and vanishes, and Margo assumes control, stonewalling Waldheim from any further questioning. Eventually, Carter and Cain break from their confines and pounce upon Dr. Waldheim, knocking her unconscious and leaving the building disguised as her. The police soon find Waldheim, who begs them to arrest Carter before he harms Amy.

Jenny follows a woman who she thinks is Waldheim to a motel, but it is actually Carter/Cain. She follows Carter/Cain, who is now Margo, into an elevator. When it opens, she sees Nix Sr. holding Amy hostage. While Jenny begs for Nix Sr. to give back her daughter, Carter, Cain and Margo stab "their" father from behind. Jack arrives with the police, and Carter and his personalities disappear.

Later on, Jenny takes Amy to a park and explains to her friend Sarah that Nix Sr. faked his own death and established a new identity and a clandestine research facility in Norway. He had been using Carter and his multiples to procure the children so he would have an adequate control group to study the development of MPD.

Amy runs off into the woods, calling for her father. Jenny follows her and finds Amy, who says her father has gone away. When Jenny bends down to pick Amy up, Carter appears behind her in a wig and a dress; Margo is now in control.

== Cast ==
- John Lithgow as Dr. Carter Nix / Cain / Dr. Carter Nix Sr. / Josh / Margo
- Lolita Davidovich as Dr. Jenny O’Keefe Nix
- Steven Bauer as Jack Dante
- Frances Sternhagen as Dr. Lyn Waldheim
- Gregg Henry as Lieutenant Terri
- Tom Bower as Sergeant Sean Cally
- Mel Harris as Sarah
- Teri Austin as Karen Bowman
- Gabrielle Carteris as Nan
- Barton Heyman as Mack
- Amanda Pombo as Amy Nix
- Kathleen Callan as Emma
- Geoff Callan as Young Lover

== Production ==
During production on The Bonfire of the Vanities, Brian De Palma toyed around with the idea of a suspense movie set on a playground. He was concerned however, that returning to the suspense genre was dangerous for him as it could be regarded as a step backward in his career. Part of the plot's inception came from De Palma's own experience having a relationship with a married woman; while watching her sleep, he wondered what would happen if he did not wake her in time for her to return to her husband.

Originally titled Father's Day, Raising Cain was the director's first in the suspense/thriller genre in almost a decade; the prior was 1984's Body Double. The role of the five characters, or personalities (Dr. Carter Nix, Cain, Dr. Carter Nix Sr., Josh, and Margo) went to John Lithgow, who had previously worked with De Palma in Obsession and Blow Out.

Production took place in southern San Francisco Peninsula communities of Mountain View, Los Altos, Palo Alto, Menlo Park and Woodside. Locations included Stanford Shopping Center, the old Stanford Children's Hospital, and Mountain View City Hall, as well as the Legion of Honor Museum in San Francisco. The film's director Brian De Palma and producer Gale Anne Hurd were married and living in Woodside at the time. De Palma explained, "Gale was pregnant, and I wanted to do a movie that I could do very simply and that was close to home."

Principal photography began on October 23, 1991. Production was completed on December 18, 1991.

== Reception ==
Critical reviews were mixed to positive, with Lithgow earning praise. Raising Cain holds a 65% rating on Rotten Tomatoes based on 43 reviews. The site's critical consensus states "Raising Cain doesn't rank with Brian De Palma's best work, but John Lithgow's spellbinding split-personality performance makes this thriller hard to dismiss."

Janet Maslin of The New York Times called the film a "delirious thriller" that "finds Mr. De Palma creating spellbinding, beautifully executed images that often make practically no sense. Working with an exhilarating sense of freedom, he seems to not care in the least what any of it really means. The results are playful, lively and no less unstrung than Dr. Carter Nix himself." Lawrence Cohn of Variety described the film as "a superficial, often risible, exercise in pure aesthetics that's likely to turn off mainstream audiences, spelling a fast flop. As a showcase for John Lithgow's acting talents and a visual tour de force, the film may delight the director's most camp followers." Kenneth Turan of the Los Angeles Times wrote that "De Palma has concocted a hugely improbable stew that is preposterous from beginning to end. And, despite some early confusion on this point, he has clearly done so with careful deliberation, intending Raising Cain to function simultaneously as both a thriller and a parody of thrillers. A commendably ambitious idea, but one that does not work well at all in this particular case." Dave Kehr of the Chicago Tribune gave the film one star out of four and wrote, "Lifting his subject this time from Michael Powell's extremely disturbing Peeping Tom of 1960, De Palma has created one of the most incoherent films in memory, a mass of contradictions and inconsistencies that appears to have defeated the best efforts of three credited editors to make marginal sense of it." Hal Hinson of The Washington Post wrote that "director Brian De Palma addresses his most vivid personal issues—his obsession with Hitchcock and twins, and the loss of innocence—but he runs through them impersonally, as if the luster of his own obsessions has worn off. That luster is about all that's missing from this flamboyant, skillfully crafted bit of moviemaking, but its absence makes Raising Cain seem like something of a rehash." Owen Gleiberman of Entertainment Weekly assigned a grade of B− and wrote: "Is Raising Cain a good movie? No way. You could almost say it's intentionally bad — a gleeful piece of jerry-built schlock. Yet De Palma's naughty-boy gamesmanship has a perverse fascination, even when it doesn't work (which is most of the time)."

=== Box office ===
The film was a modest box office success, grossing $37.1 million worldwide.

=== Accolades ===
Award	Category	Subject	Result
Saturn Awards	Best Actor	John Lithgow	Nominated
Saturn Awards	Best Supporting Actress	Frances Sternhagen	Nominated
Venice Film Festival	Golden Lion	Brian De Palma	Nominated

== Director's cut ==
A Collector's Edition Blu-ray of the film featuring the director's cut as well as the theatrical cut was released on September 13, 2016. The director's cut features scenes that are reorganized as originally intended. The cut was originally edited by Peet Gelderblom, a director from the Netherlands and a long-time De Palma fan. He found out De Palma had regrets about the theatrical cut, and so created a fan edit to more closely resemble the original script, and posted the result on IndieWire in January 2012. De Palma came across Gelderblom's edit and was so impressed by it, he had Gelderblom supervise a high definition version of it for Blu-ray, which was released under the Director's Cut label, as De Palma felt that the edit has "restored the true story of Raising Cain".
