= The Changing Room =

1971 play by David Storey

- First edition
- Written by: David Storey
- Characters: 22 men: rugby players and staff
- Genre: Drama
- Setting: Changing room of a rugby field

Premiere
- Date: 9 November 1971
- Place: Royal Court Theatre, London

The Changing Room is a 1971 play by David Storey, set in a men's changing room before, during and after a rugby league football game. It premiered at the Royal Court Theatre on 9 November 1971, directed by Lindsay Anderson. The 1973 Broadway production, directed by Michael Rudman, won several awards including the New York Drama Critics' Circle award for Best Play and the Tony Award for Best Featured Actor for John Lithgow. The technical director for the play was the former Great Britain Rugby League captain Bev Risman.

== Plot ==
At the play's core is a semi-pro Northern England rugby league team. During the week, its members are peaceable men toiling away at mindless, working class jobs. On Saturday, they prepare for gory combat on the playing field. The changing room is where they perform their pre-game initiation rites, strip down, loosen muscles, and get into their uniforms. After the match they return, often broken, muddy, and bloody, regretting their loss or giddy with victory in the communal shower. There is little in the way of plot, but Storey engages his audience with his ability to dissect his characters' hurts, hopes, desires, and fighting instincts.

== Productions ==
Premiering on 9 November 1971 at London's Royal Court Theatre, The Changing Room had a limited, sold-out run before transferring to the Globe in the West End on 14 December. It was directed by Lindsay Anderson and the cast included Jim Norton, David Daker, Warren Clarke, Brian Glover, Alun Armstrong and John Barrett.

The U.S. premiere was at New Haven's Long Wharf Theatre on 17 November 1972. After three previews, the Broadway production, directed by Michael Rudman, opened on 6 March 1973 at the Morosco Theatre, where it ran for 192 performances. The cast included George Hearn, John Lithgow, Richard Masur, John Tillinger, and Tom Atkins.

The play was revived in 1996 by the Royal Court, in their 'Classics' season, premiering on 1 February and running for two months at the Duke of York's Theatre.

== Reception ==
Despite extensive male nudity, there was very little controversy associated with the play in 1971. Critical reception was favourable, with the treatment of male relationships praised particularly. Most criticism focused upon the lack of character development and plot. Noël Coward commented, leaving the theatre: "15 acorns are hardly worth the price of admission," referring to the male nudity.

American critics were more glowing in their praise, with the production hailed by Walter Kerr of The New York Times as "mysterious and ultimately mesmerizing." Clive Barnes, also of The New York Times, wrote: "It is a remarkable play because while it only purports to document what goes on in a locker room before, during and after a football game, the playwright's skill is such that we seem to get to know these football players and the society that produced them."

The Broadway production of The Changing Room won the New York Drama Critics' Circle award for best play for the 1973 season. John Lithgow won the Tony Award for Best Featured Actor in a Play and the Drama Desk Award for Outstanding Performance. Tom Atkins won the Drama Desk Award for Most Promising Performer, and Michael Rudman won for Outstanding Director.

During the 1996 revival, critical reception was more mixed. Some critics commented on how the play had aged; both rugby league and the global politics mentioned in the play had moved on a long way in the intervening two decades. Many women's publications criticised the macho nature of the play. In contrast, Paul Taylor of The Independent wrote, "...The Changing Room seems, in 1996, at once a timeless study of male bonding rites and a preservation in art of a fast-vanishing culture."

== Awards and nominations ==
- Tony Award for Best Play (nominee)
- Tony Award for Best Featured Actor in a Play (Lithgow, winner)
- Tony Award for Best Scenic Design (nominee)
- Tony Award for Best Direction of a Play (nominee)
- Drama Desk Award for Outstanding Performance (Lithgow, winner)
- Drama Desk Award for Most Promising Performer (Atkins, winner)
- Drama Desk Award for Outstanding Director (winner)
- Drama Desk Award for Outstanding Set Design (winner)
- New York Drama Critics' Circle Award for Best Play (winner)
