= Sweet Smell of Success (musical) =

2002 musical

- Original Cast Recording
- Music: Marvin Hamlisch
- Lyrics: Craig Carnelia
- Book: John Guare
- Basis: Sweet Smell of Success by Alexander Mackendrick; Clifford Odets; Ernest Lehman; Sweet Smell of Success by Ernest Lehman
- Productions: 2002 Broadway

Sweet Smell of Success is a musical created by Marvin Hamlisch (music), Craig Carnelia (lyrics), and John Guare (book). The show is based on the 1957 movie of the same name, which in turn was based on the 1955 novelette of the same name by Ernest Lehman. The show tells the story of a powerful newspaper columnist named J. J. Hunsecker (based on famed New York columnist Walter Winchell) who uses his connections to ruin his sister's relationship with a man he deems inappropriate.

It was a critical and commercial failure.

== Production history ==
A workshop was held in Toronto in August 1998. According to a Livent spokesman "...the show had a cast of 18, made up mainly of Canadians. The performers' names were not revealed." The workshop was directed by Nicholas Hytner. The workshop was followed by a reading in November 1998 in New York City, with Jonathan Pryce as J.J. Hunsecker, Brian d'Arcy James as Sidney, Anastasia Barzee, Patrick Wilson, Stacey Logan and an ensemble of 12.

The work had a pre-Broadway tryout in Chicago in January 2002. Critics' reactions were not favorable. Chicago Tribune critic Chris Jones found that it had an "identity crisis" and warned that "...[b]etween now and the Broadway opening, director Nicholas Hytner and the other multitalented parties involved had better all get on the same conceptual page, or what’s left of the gossip column fraternity will have a lot to chew on."

Subsequently changes were made to the show, including a new ending.

Modifications to the plot and differences from the film reportedly reflect author Ernest Lehman's original intent. Lehman, the author of the original novelette, was a producer on the musical adaptation.

The musical opened on March 14, 2002 at the Martin Beck Theatre on Broadway. Again directed by Hytner, it closed on June 15, 2002, after 109 performances and 18 previews. The show starred John Lithgow as J.J. Hunsecker, and Brian d'Arcy James as Sidney Falcone.

The creative team included choreography by Christopher Wheeldon, sets and costumes by Bob Crowley, and lighting by Natasha Katz. Sweet Smell garnered seven Tony Award nominations including Best Musical. John Lithgow received the show's only Tony Award, winning Best Performance by a Leading Actor in a Musical.

== Cast and characters ==
Character	Broadway (2002)	Master Voices (2025)
J.J. Hunsecker	John Lithgow	Raul Esparza
Sidney	Brian d'Arcy James	Ali Louis Bourzgui
Susan	Kelli O'Hara	Lizzy Mcalpine
Dallas	Jack Noseworthy	Noah J, Ricketts
Rita	Stacey Logan	Aline Mayagoitia
Club Zanzibar Singer	Bernard Dotson	

=== Notable Replacements ===
- Susan: Elena Shaddow (u/s)
- Sidney: Frank Vlastnik (u/s)

== Musical numbers ==
Source: Playbill

Act I

- "The Column" - J.J., Sidney, and Ensemble
- "I Could Get You in J.J." - Sidney
- "I Cannot Hear the City" - Dallas
- "Welcome to the Night" - J.J., Sidney, and Ensemble
- "Laughin' All the Way to the Bank" - Club Zanzibar Singer
- "At the Fountain" - Sidney
- "Psalm 151" † - J.J. and Sidney
- "Don't Know Where You Leave Off" - Dallas and Susan
- "What If" - Susan and Ensemble
- "For Susan" - J.J.
- "One Track Mind" - Dallas
- "Act I Finale" † - Ensemble

Act II

- "Break It Up" - J.J., Sidney, and Ensemble
- "Rita's Tune" - Rita
- "Dirt" - Ensemble
- "I Could Get You in J.J." (Reprise) - Sidney
- "I Cannot Hear the City" (Reprise) - Susan and Dallas
- "Don't Look Now" - J.J. and Ensemble
- "At the Fountain" (Reprise) - Sidney and Ensemble
- "Act II Finale" - J.J., Susan, Sidney, and Ensemble

† Not included on the Original Broadway Cast Recording (2002)

== Awards and nominations ==
=== Original Broadway production ===
Year	Award	Category	Nominee	Result
2002	Tony Award	Best Musical		Nominated
2002	Tony Award	Best Book of a Musical	John Guare	Nominated
2002	Tony Award	Best Original Score	Marvin Hamlisch and Craig Carnelia	Nominated
2002	Tony Award	Best Performance by a Leading Actor in a Musical	John Lithgow	Won
2002	Tony Award	Best Performance by a Featured Actor in a Musical	Brian d'Arcy James	Nominated
2002	Tony Award	Best Orchestrations	William David Brohn	Nominated
2002	Tony Award	Best Lighting Design	Natasha Katz	Nominated
2002	Drama Desk Awards	Outstanding Musical		Nominated
2002	Drama Desk Awards	Outstanding Book of a Musical	John Guare	Nominated
2002	Drama Desk Awards	Outstanding Lyrics	Craig Carnelia	Nominated
2002	Drama Desk Awards	Outstanding Music	Marvin Hamlisch	Nominated
2002	Drama Desk Awards	Outstanding Actor in a Musical	John Lithgow	Won
2002	Drama Desk Awards	Outstanding Actor in a Musical	Brian d'Arcy James	Nominated
2002	Drama Desk Awards	Outstanding Director of a Musical	Nicholas Hytner	Nominated
2002	Drama Desk Awards	Outstanding Choreography	Christopher Wheeldon	Nominated
2002	Drama Desk Awards	Outstanding Costume Design	Bob Crowley	Nominated
2002	Drama Desk Awards	Outstanding Set Design	Bob Crowley	Nominated
2002	Drama Desk Awards	Outstanding Lighting Design	Natasha Katz	Nominated

== Reception ==
Despite eager anticipation, the musical version received largely negative reviews and it was a commercial flop. Reportedly, it lost its entire $10 million investment. One critic lamented that it was "a real heartbreaker; one of those fabulous sounding new musicals with an impeccable pedigree which never quite comes together and ultimately only disappoints."

A 2012 London production of the musical met with mixed reviews. Theatre critic Lyn Gardner of The Guardian praised the score and choreography but found that it: "sugars the pill and never locates the savage, cynical heart... It wants to be a straightforward song-and-dance show – the problem is, this piece is anything but."
