= The Columnist (play) =

Play by David Auburn

- Original language: English
- Written by: David Auburn
- Subject: A fictionalized biographical drama about journalist Joseph Alsop.
- Genre: Drama
- Setting: Washington, D.C.

Premiere
- Date: April 25, 2012
- Place: Samuel J. Friedman Theatre

The Columnist is a play by American playwright David Auburn. It opened on Broadway's Samuel J. Friedman Theatre, under the direction of Daniel J. Sullivan. The play opened on April 25, 2012, and closed July 8, 2012, with John Lithgow starring as Joseph Alsop. The cast also included Margaret Colin, Boyd Gaines, Grace Gummer, Stephen Kunken, Marc Bonan and Brian J. Smith.

== Background ==
In researching journalists, David Auburn became interested in frequent references to Joseph Alsop. "I I realized here was this person who was so well known, so influential — almost a household name in his day — and now he's completely obscure," explained Auburn. "And, the play kind of came out of wondering, 'How does that happen? How do you go from being that central figure to being, at first, a kind of joke and then almost forgotten?' It was in digging into that that I found the story."

== Synopsis ==
Set between 1954 and 1968, American journalist Joseph Alsop finds his relevance fading as attention shifts from the Cold War to the Vietnam War.

== Awards and nominations ==
- 2012 Tony Award for Best Actor in a Play nominee for John Lithgow
