= Hytner =

Hytner is a surname. Notable people with the surname include:

- Benet Hytner (1927–2023), former Judge of Appeal of the Isle of Man
- Joyce Hytner (born 1935), British theatrical fundraiser
- Nicholas Hytner (born 1956), English theatre, film, and opera director
- Steve Hytner (born 1959), American actor
