= National Theatre Live =

UK television programmes

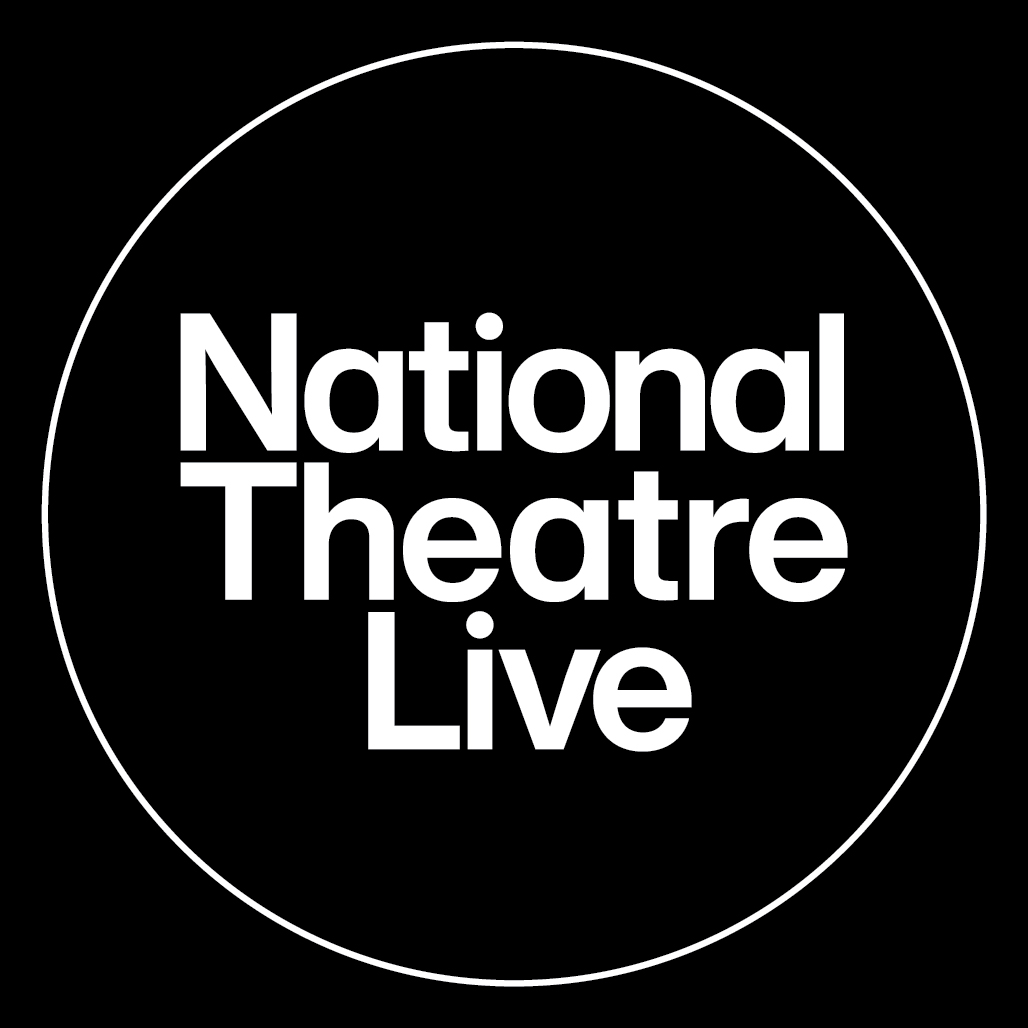
Logo of National Theatre Live

National Theatre Live is an initiative operated by the Royal National Theatre in London. It broadcasts live and filmed live performances of their productions (and those of other theatres) to a range of venues, including cinemas, pubs, village halls and arts centres, around the world.

== About ==
I grew up in Manchester in the 60s. If I had been able to see Olivier's National Theatre at my local cinema, I would have gone all of the time.

— Nicholas Hytner, director of the Royal National Theatre.

The programme began its pilot season in June 2009 with a production of Phèdre, starring Helen Mirren, which screened live in 70 cinemas across the UK. Two hundred more venues eventually showed the production internationally, resulting in a combined audience of around 50,000 people for this one performance. The second production, All's Well That Ends Well, showed at a total of around 300 screens, and today, the number of venues that show NT Live productions has grown to around 700.

With the exception of a Saturday matinee for Nation, a Monday evening showing for London Assurance, and a Tuesday evening showing for A Streetcar Named Desire, all National Theatre Live productions have been broadcast on a Thursday evening, to avoid conflicting with cinemas' weekend schedules. Most venues screen the productions live as they are broadcast, but because of the time differences in South Africa, Australia, New Zealand, and the United States venues in those countries show the recorded production some days later. Many venues also offer repeat screenings of popular productions which they term 'Encores'.

Most productions broadcast are plays performed in repertory at the Royal National Theatre, but works by other companies have been included. A Disappearing Number by Complicité was broadcast live from the Theatre Royal, Plymouth on 14 October 2010. The Donmar Warehouse's production of King Lear, starring Derek Jacobi was broadcast live on 3 February 2011. In the summer of 2013, a broadcast of Macbeth starring Kenneth Branagh and Alex Kingston was broadcast live from the Manchester International Festival. Following this, A Streetcar Named Desire starring Gillian Anderson was broadcast live from the Young Vic on 16 September 2014.

Over the years from 2015 to 2019, National Theatre Live released a wide range of plays in cinemas including ones from the National Theatre and others from the West End such as Who's Afraid of Virginia Woolf? with Imelda Staunton and All About Eve with Lily James and Gillian Anderson. It also broadcast both parts of Tony Kushner's Angels in America on week apart. Other notable productions include Phoebe Waller-Bridge's Fleabag and Cyrano de Bergerac with James McAvoy (the last the screen in cinemas before the COVID-19 pandemic).

The programme returned to screens in 2022 with Leopoldstadt, which had its cinema run cancelled due to the closure of theatres and arts venues. Following this, plays released included the one-woman Prima Facie with Jodie Comer and GOOD with David Tennant.

In April 2024, National Theatre Live released its 100th play in cinemas, Nye featuring Michael Sheen, broadcast live from the National Theatre. Since then the programme has included highlights such as the National Theatre's brand new production of Oscar Wilde's The Importance of Being Earnest and Inter Alia with Rosamund Pike. From the West End they have broadcast Dr. Strangelove with Steve Coogan, based on the 1964 Stanley Kubrick film, Mrs. Warren's Profession from the Garrick Theatre and The Fifth Step from in-the-round theatre @sohoplace, featuring Jack Lowden and Martin Freeman.

2025's season includes a line-up of shows starting with a new West End production of All My Sons with Bryan Cranston, filmed live from Wyndham's Theatre. From the National Theatre, John Millington Synge's The Playboy of the Western World and Christopher Hampton's Les Liaisons Dangereuses join the season.

== Live broadcasts ==
Live performances are broadcast live from the National Theatre (unless noted). They are certified differently from feature films.

=== Season 1 (2009-2010) ===
- Phèdre – 25 June 2009
- All's Well That Ends Well – 1 October 2009
- Nation – 30 January 2010
- The Habit of Art – 22 April 2010
- London Assurance – 28 June 2010

=== Season 2 (2010-2011) ===
- A Disappearing Number – 14 October 2010
- Hamlet – 9 December 2010
- Fela! – 13 January 2011
- King Lear – 3 February 2011 (broadcast from the Donmar Warehouse)
- Frankenstein – 17 & 24 March 2011
- The Cherry Orchard – 30 June 2011

=== Season 3 (2011-2012) ===
- One Man, Two Guvnors – 15 September 2011
- The Kitchen – 6 October 2011
- Collaborators – 1 December 2011
- Travelling Light – 9 February 2012
- The Comedy of Errors – 1 March 2012
- She Stoops to Conquer – 29 March 2012

=== Season 4 (2012-2013) ===
- The Curious Incident of the Dog in the Night-Time – 6 September 2012
- The Last of the Haussmans – 11 October 2012
- Timon of Athens – 1 November 2012
- The Magistrate – 17 January 2013
- People – 21 March 2013
- This House – 16 May 2013
- The Audience – 13 June 2013 (broadcast from the Gielgud Theatre)
- Macbeth – 20 July 2013 (broadcast from the Manchester International Festival)

=== Season 5 (2013-2014) ===
- Othello – 26 September 2013
- Coriolanus – 30 January 2014 (broadcast from the Donmar Warehouse)
- Chewing Gum Dreams – 19 March 2014
- War Horse – 27 February 2014 – (broadcast from the New London Theatre)
- King Lear – 1 May 2014
- A Small Family Business – 12 June 2014
- Skylight – 17 July 2014 (broadcast from Wyndham's Theatre)

=== Season 6 (2014-2015) ===
- Medea – 4 September 2014
- A Streetcar Named Desire – 16 September 2014 (broadcast from the Young Vic)
- JOHN – 9 December 2014
- Treasure Island – 22 January 2015
- Behind the Beautiful Forevers – 12 March 2015
- A View from the Bridge – 26 March 2015 (The Young Vic production broadcast from Wyndham's Theatre)
- The Hard Problem – 16 April 2015
- Man and Superman – 14 May 2015
- Everyman – 16 July 2015

=== Season 7 (2015-2016) ===
- The Beaux' Stratagem – 3 September 2015
- Hamlet – 15 October 2015 (broadcast from the Barbican Theatre)
- Of Mice and Men – 19 November 2015 (broadcast from the Longacre Theatre)
- Jane Eyre – 8 December 2015
- Les Liaisons Dangereuses – 28 January 2016 (broadcast from the Donmar Warehouse)
- As You Like It – 25 February 2016
- Hangmen – 3 March 2016 (Royal Court production broadcast from Wyndham's Theatre)

=== Season 8 (2016-2017) ===
- The Deep Blue Sea – 1 September 2016
- The Threepenny Opera – 22 September 2016
- No Man's Land – 15 December 2016 (broadcast from Wyndham's Theatre)
- Amadeus – 2 February 2017
- Saint Joan – 16 February 2017 (broadcast from the Donmar Warehouse)
- Hedda Gabler – 9 March 2017
- Twelfth Night – 6 April 2017
- Rosencrantz and Guildenstern Are Dead – 20 April 2017 (broadcast from The Old Vic)
- Obsession – 11 May 2017 (broadcast from the Barbican Theatre)
- Who's Afraid of Virginia Woolf? – 18 May 2017 (broadcast from the Harold Pinter Theatre)
- Peter Pan – 10 June 2017
- Salomé – 22 June 2017
- Angels in America, Part One: Millennium Approaches – 20 July 2017
- Angels in America, Part Two: Perestroika – 27 July 2017
- Yerma – 31 August 2017 (broadcast from The Young Vic)

=== Season 9 (2017-2018) ===
- Follies – 16 November 2017
- Young Marx – 7 December 2017 (production broadcast from the Bridge Theatre)
- Cat on a Hot Tin Roof – 22 February 2018 (The Young Vic production broadcast from the Apollo Theatre)
- Julius Caesar – 22 March 2018 (production broadcast from the Bridge Theatre)
- Macbeth – 10 May 2018

=== Season 10 (2018-2019) ===
- Julie – 6 September 2018
- King Lear – 27 September 2018 (Chichester Festival Theatre production broadcast from the Duke of York's Theatre)
- Allelujah! - 1 November 2018
- The Madness of George III – 20 November 2018 (broadcast from the Nottingham Playhouse)
- Antony & Cleopatra – 6 December 2018
- The Tragedy of King Richard the Second – 15 January 2019 (broadcast from the Almeida Theatre)
- I'm Not Running – 31 January 2019
- All About Eve – 11 April 2019 (broadcast from the Noël Coward Theatre)
- All My Sons – 14 May 2019 (broadcast from The Old Vic; due to a competing Broadway production then under way, North American streaming was postponed until a later date)
- Small Island – 27 June 2019
- The Lehman Trilogy – 25 July 2019 (broadcast from the Piccadilly Theatre)

=== Season 11 (2019-2020) ===
- Fleabag – 12 September 2019 (a Soho Theatre production, broadcast from the Wyndham's Theatre)
- A Midsummer Night's Dream – 17 October 2019 (broadcast from the Bridge Theatre)
- Hansard – 7 November 2019
- Present Laughter – 28 November 2019 (broadcast from The Old Vic)
- Cyrano de Bergerac – 20 February 2020 (broadcast from Playhouse Theatre)
- The Welkin – ~~21 May 2020~~ Cancelled due to UK theatre closures relating to the 2020 COVID-19 pandemic
- Leopoldstadt – ~~25 June 2020~~ Cancelled due to UK theatre closures relating to the 2020 COVID-19 pandemic
- Jack Absolute Flies Again – ~~23 July 2020~~ Cancelled due to UK theatre closures relating to the 2020 COVID-19 pandemic

=== Season 12 (2022) ===
- Leopoldstadt – 27 January 2022 (broadcast from the Wyndham's Theatre)
- The Book of Dust – 17 February 2022 (broadcast from the Bridge Theatre)
- Henry V – 21 April 2022 (broadcast from the Donmar Warehouse)
- Straight Line Crazy – 26 May 2022 (broadcast from the Bridge Theatre)
- Prima Facie – 21 July 2022 (broadcast from the Harold Pinter Theatre)
- Much Ado About Nothing – 8 September 2022
- Jack Absolute Flies Again – 6 October 2022
- The Seagull – 3 November 2022 (filmed live at the Harold Pinter Theatre)

=== Season 13 (2023) ===
- The Crucible – 26 January 2023
- Othello – 23 February 2023
- Life of Pi – 30 March 2023 (filmed live at Wyndham's Theatre, due to a competing Broadway production then under way, North American streaming was postponed until a later date)
- GOOD – 20 April 2023 (filmed live at the Harold Pinter Theatre)
- Best of Enemies – 18 May 2023 (filmed live at the Noël Coward Theatre)

=== Season 14 (2024) ===
- Dear England – 25 January 2024
- Vanya – 22 February 2024 (filmed live at the Duke of York's Theatre)
- The Motive and the Cue – 21 March 2024
- Nye – 23 April 2024

=== Season 15 (2025-2026) ===
- The Importance of Being Earnest – 20 February 2025
- Dr. Strangelove – 27 March 2025 (filmed live at the Noël Coward Theatre)
- Inter Alia - 4 September 2025
- Mrs. Warren's Profession - 23 October 2025 (filmed live at Garrick Theatre)
- The Fifth Step - 27 November 2025 (filmed live at @sohoplace)
- Hamlet - 22 January 2026

=== Season 16 (2026) ===
- All My Sons - 16 April 2026 (filmed live at Wyndham's Theatre)
- The Playboy of the Western World - 28 May 2026
- Les Liaisons Dangereuses - 25 June 2026
- The Misanthrope - 22 September 2026

=== Season 17 (2027) ===
- Hay Fever - 14 January 2027 (filmed live at Noël Coward Theatre)

== See also ==
- BroadwayHD
- Metropolitan Opera Live in HD
- Royal National Theatre
- List of Royal National Theatre Company actors
- Theatre of the United Kingdom
- Theater in the United States
