= La Belle Sauvage (play) =

2021 play by Bryony Lavery

The Book of Dust – La Belle Sauvage
- Poster for the Bridge Theatre production
- Written by: Philip Pullman (novel); Bryony Lavery (play)
- Original language: English

Premiere
- Date premiered: 30 November 2021
- Place premiered: Bridge Theatre, London

The Book of Dust – La Belle Sauvage is a play by Bryony Lavery based on the 2017 fantasy novel of the same name by Philip Pullman which is the first part of The Book of Dust trilogy (set twelve years before Pullman's His Dark Materials).

== Production ==
The play made its world premiere at the Bridge Theatre, London on 30 November 2021 (with a press night on 14 December) running until 26 February 2022. The play was originally scheduled to open in the summer of 2020, however was postponed due to the COVID-19 pandemic. The play will also be broadcast live to cinemas as part of NT Live on 17 February 2022.

The production is directed by Nicholas Hytner, who also directed the stage adaptation of His Dark Materials at the National Theatre, London in 2003 and 2004. The show was Co-Directed with Emily Burns, set and costume design by Bob Crowley, puppetry by Barnaby Dixon, lighting design by Jon Clark, sound by Paul Arditti, video design by Luke Halls and music by Grant Olding.

Casting was announced on 21 October 2021.
