= Oliver Chris =

English actor (born 1978)

- Born: Oliver Graham Chris; 7 November 1978 (age 47); Royal Tunbridge Wells, Kent, England
- Education: Royal Central School of Speech and Drama
- Years active: 2000–present
- Partner: Kate Phillips
- Children: 1

Oliver Graham Chris (born 7 November 1978) is an English actor. He has appeared in television series, TV films, and on the stage. His work has included theatrical productions in London's West End and New York City's Broadway.

== Early life ==
Chris was born in Royal Tunbridge Wells, Kent. He passed his eleven-plus exam and attended Tunbridge Wells Grammar School for Boys before moving to the Michael Hall Steiner School in his fourth year. He later graduated from the Royal Central School of Speech and Drama. In 2005, he completed an evening class at Birkbeck College, University of London and was subsequently accepted for a degree course in history, politics and philosophy.

== Career ==
Chris has appeared in several comedy series, including The Office, Green Wing, According to Bex, Nathan Barley, The IT Crowd, Rescue Me and Bluestone 42.

In 2004, Chris re-wrote the lyrics to the Beatles' "Let It Be" to a song about the England football player Wayne Rooney and recorded it in collaboration with the actor Stephen Campbell Moore and a number of other actors and journalists. The song was reprised and re-recorded, with rewritten lyrics, for the 2006 Fifa World Cup and became a hit on YouTube, with 200,000 views.

Chris has also narrated most of the Alex Rider series of audiobooks by Anthony Horowitz, although Dan Stevens replaced him as reader for Snakehead, Crocodile Tears and Scorpia Rising.

In early 2006, Chris played the role of Captain Leonard in Sharpe's Challenge, starring Sean Bean, while 2007 saw him in the TV comedy Bonkers, written by Sally Wainwright as well as Petruchio in The Taming of the Shrew at the Wilton's Music Hall. In 2006, he also appeared as Christian in Cyrano de Bergerac at the Royal Exchange Theatre, Manchester. He later appeared in Peter Hall's production of The Portrait of a Lady. He made his West End debut in late 2008 in Lisa Kron's comedy, Well. In 2010, he appeared alongside Judi Dench in Hall's production of A Midsummer Night's Dream at the Rose Theatre, Kingston.

Chris was cast in Ben Miller's feature-length debut comedy film Huge, which premiered in June 2010. In 2011, saw him appear in two episodes of Silent Witness, whilst also playing one of the leading roles in the National Theatre production of One Man, Two Guvnors alongside James Corden. He appeared in three series of the BBC Three comedy Bluestone 42, about a British bomb disposal detachment in Afghanistan. He also played Dr Richard Truscott in the ITV medical drama series Breathless, set in the 1960s, which ran for one series from October 2013.

From 2014 to 2016, Chris played Prince William in the play King Charles III, appearing in the West End and on Broadway. In May 2017, he appeared in the same role in the BBC Two film adaptation.

Between February and May 2017, Chris played Orsino in a production of Twelfth Night at the Royal National Theatre. He also played Friedrich Engels in Richard Bean and Clive Coleman's new play Young Marx, the opening production at the Bridge Theatre in December 2017. In 2019, Chris took on the roles of Oberon and Theseus in Nicholas Hytner's adaptation of A Midsummer Night's Dream at the Bridge Theatre, London. Paul Taylor, in his review for The Independent, described Chris' Oberon as "superlatively funny" while Stig Abell in the TLS opined that doubling the roles of Oberon and Theseus allowed Chris "to be by turns sublime and ridiculous, stuffy and lusty".

Chris' writing credits include Ralegh: The Treason Trial, staged at the Winchester Great Hall and then the Sam Wanamaker Playhouse in 2018 and Jack Absolute Flies Again, based on Sheridan's The Rivals, co-written with Richard Bean, due to be staged at the Olivier Theatre in 2020.

== Personal life ==
Chris is the partner of actress Kate Phillips and they have a daughter. Until 2012, he was engaged to actress Rachael Stirling, whom he had been dating since 2007.

== Filmography ==
=== Film ===
Year	Title	Role	Notes
2003	The Gathering	Brett	
2004	Bridget Jones: The Edge of Reason	Director in Gallery	
2010	Huge	Darren	
2018	The Little Stranger	Tony Morley	
2020	Dolittle	Sir Gareth	
2020	Miss Marx	Friedrich 'Freddy' Demuth	
2020	Emma	John Knightley	
2022	Living	Hart	
2022	What's Love Got to Do with It?	James	
2023	Shoshana	Ralph Cairns	
2023	White Widow	Andrew	
2026	The Magic Faraway Tree	Mr. Watzisname	

=== Television ===
Year	Title	Role	Notes
2000	Lorna Doone	Charley Doone	Television film
2001	The Office	Ricky Howard	6 episodes
2002	Rescue Me	Luke Chatwin	Series regular
2002	The Real Jane Austen	Tom Lefroy	Television film
2003	The Other Boleyn Girl	Henry Percy	Television film
2003	Casualty	Tim Lasky	Episode: "The Point of No Return"
2003	Sweet Medicine	Geoff Sweet	9 episodes
2003	Frankenstein: Birth of a Monster	Percy Bysshe Shelley	Television film
2004–2006	Green Wing	Boyce	18 episodes
2005	Nathan Barley	Max Herbert	Episode #1.1
2005	According to Bex	Ryan	8 episodes
2006	The IT Crowd	Daniel Carey	Episode: "Fifty-Fifty"
2006	Sharpe's Challenge	Leonard	Television film
2006	Tripping Over	Sam	4 episodes
2007	Bonkers	Marcus Lewis	Series regular
2007	Phineas and Ferb	Mr Macabre (voice)	Episode: "Terrifying Tri-State Trilogy of Terror"
2008	Fairy Tales	Vukoosin Ergovich	Miniseries; Episode: "Rapunzel"
2008	Hotel Babylon	David Duncan	Episode #3.1
2009	FM	Matt Kyle	Episode: "Blinded by the Light"
2011	Silent Witness	James Sabiston	2 episodes
2013	Breathless	Richard Truscott	6 episodes
2013–2015	Bluestone 42	Captain Nick Medhurst, ATO	Series regular
2015	The Scandalous Lady W	Viscount Deerhurst	Television film
2016–2022	Motherland	Paul	Supporting role
2017	King Charles III	Prince William	Television film
2018	The Queen and I	Prince of Wales	Television film
2018	Endeavour	Dr. Elliot Wingqvist	Episode: "Apollo"
2020–present	Trying	Freddy	24 episodes
2021	A Very British Scandal	George Emslie	Episode #1.3
2022	The Crown	James Colthurst	Episode: "The System"
2022–2024	Miss Scarlet and The Duke	Basil Sinclaire	4 episodes
2023	Maternal	Guy Cavendish	6 episodes
2023	Foundation	Director Sermak	7 episodes
2024	My Lady Jane	Narrator (voice)	8 episodes
2024	Rivals	James Vereker	Main cast

== Theatre ==
Year	Title	Role	Venue
2002	The Importance of Being Ernest	Algernon	Royal Theatre, Northampton
2007	The Taming of the Shrew	Petruchio	Wilton's Music Hall
2007	Cyrano de Bergerac	Christian	Royal Exchange Theatre, Manchester
2008	The Portrait of a Lady	Goodwood	UK Tour
2010	A Midsummer Night's Dream	Nick Bottom	Rose Theatre, Kingston
2011	One Man, Two Guvnors	Stanley Stubbers	Royal National Theatre (Lyttelton Stage) + UK 2011 Tour + Adelphi Theatre + Broadway
2014	Great Britain	Asst. Commissioner Donald Doyle Davidson	Royal National Theatre (Lyttleton Stage)
2014–2016	King Charles III	William	Almeida Theatre + Wyndham's Theatre + Broadway
2017	Twelfth Night	Orsino	Royal National Theatre, Olivier Stage
2017	Young Marx	Friedrich Engels	Bridge Theatre
2019	A Midsummer Night's Dream	Oberon / Theseus	Bridge Theatre
