= Great Britain (play) =

Satirical play written by Richard Bean

- Theatre Royal Haymarket production poster
- Original language: English
- Written by: Richard Bean

Premiere
- Date: 30 June 2014
- Place: Lyttelton Theatre, National Theatre, London

Great Britain is a satirical play written by Richard Bean. It received its world premiere at the Royal National Theatre, London on 30 June 2014, before transferring to the West End's Theatre Royal Haymarket.

== Production history ==
Great Britain is written by English playwright Richard Bean. In May 2013, it was revealed Bean was working on a new play based on the phone hacking scandal, having been commissioned by National Theatre artistic director Sir Nicholas Hytner, whilst still working on his play One Man, Two Guvnors. Speaking about the play he revealed that it would be set in a tabloid newsroom and is a play about the state-of-the-nation, press, politics and police in bed with each other. In March 2014, it was revealed that an undisclosed Bean play would premiere as part of the National Theatre 2014-15 season, Hytner's last as the National's artistic director. In May 2014, it was revealed that Billie Piper and Oliver Chris were taking part in workshops for the play and that the cast and crew had signed non-disclosure agreements for the as yet untitled production.

On 25 June 2014, the play was officially announced as Great Britain and that it would premiere without a preview period on 30 June, at the National Theatre's Lyttelton Theatre. It is a satire about the press, police and politics, and stars Billie Piper as a newspaper editor, Paige Britain. The play is directed by Nicholas Hytner, with design by Tim Hatley, lighting design by Neil Austin, video design by Leo Warner, music by Grant Olding, sound design by Paul Arditti and Clive Coleman acting as a story consultant. The launch was slightly delayed by concerns over legal issues which might have been caused by running at the same time as R v Coulson, Brooks and others.

Following its premiere production the play transferred to the West End's Theatre Royal Haymarket on 9 September 2014, with its official opening night coming on 26 September, booking until 10 January 2015. The transfer was announced only one day after opening at the national. Lucy Punch took over the role of Paige Britain and Ben Mansfield replaced Oliver Chris as Asst. Commissioner Donald Doyle Davidson for the West End Run, due to prior commitments. The play was reworked for its West End debut, with around twenty minutes cut from the running time.

== Principal roles and original cast ==
Original National Theatre cast of Great Britain

Character	National Theatre performer	West End performer
Paige Britain	Billie Piper	Lucy Punch
Wilson Tikkel	Robert Glenister	Robert Glenister
Asst. Commissioner Donald Doyle Davidson	Oliver Chris	Ben Mansfield
Hunter Dixon	Ross Boatman	
Garth Ellerington	William Chubb	
Paschal O'Leary	Dermot Crowley	
Marcus Hussein	Scott Karim	
Maddy Fitzpatrick	Barbara Kirby	
Boris Tudor	Nicholas Lumley	
Diane Bendall	Maggie McCarthy	
Billy Cain	Iain Mitchell	
Commissioner Sully Kassam	Aaron Neil	
Howard Woolf	Nick Sampson	
Wendy Klinkard	Kiruna Stamell	
Mac Macmanaman	Andrew Woodall	
Tina Ursal / Babs	Sarah Annis	
Larry Arthur / Bodger	Robert Calvert	
Virginia White / Jackie Spence / DI Da Costa	Jo Dockery	
Jimmy the Bins / St John / Felix	Ian Hallard	
Wallace Gee / Kieron Mills	James Harkness	
Thierry Picq / Sergeant Ojo	Miles Mitchell	
Gemma Charles / Stella Stone	Kellie Shirley	
Clarissa Kingston-Mills / Stella's Mum	Harriet Thorpe	
Jonathan Whey / Stevie	Rupert Vansittart	
DCI Cram/ Jasper Donald	Joseph Wilkins	
