= Young Marx (play) =

2017 play by Richard Bean

- Official artwork
- Original language: English
- Written by: Richard Bean; Clive Coleman
- Subject: The early life of Karl Marx
- Genre: Comedy
- Setting: 1850, Soho

Premiere
- Date: 27 October 2017
- Place: Bridge Theatre; London

Young Marx is a play by Richard Bean and Clive Coleman about the early life of Karl Marx.

It was the opening production at the Bridge Theatre in London (residency of the London Theatre Company), a new commercial theatre founded by previous National Theatre artistic director Nicholas Hytner and executive director Nick Starr. The production opened the theatre on Friday 27 October 2017, following previews from Wednesday 18 October, and ran until Sunday 31 December 2017. The production was also broadcast through National Theatre Live in December.

The production starred Rory Kinnear in the title role and Oliver Chris as Friedrich Engels and reunited the creative team of Bean's previous hit play One Man Two Guvnors (which premiered at the National Theatre), directed by Hytner, designed by Mark Thompson, music by Grant Olding, lighting by Mark Henderson and sound by Paul Arditti.

On 17 August, the full company was announced alongside Kinnear and Chris.

== Plot ==
The description published on the play's information page on the Bridge Theatre's website is as follows:

1850, and Europe's most feared terrorist is hiding in Dean Street, Soho. Broke, restless and horny, the thirty-two-year-old revolutionary is a frothing combination of intellectual brilliance, invective, satiric wit, and child-like emotional illiteracy.

Creditors, spies, rival revolutionary factions and prospective seducers of his beautiful wife all circle like vultures. His writing blocked, his marriage dying, his friend Engels in despair at his wasted genius, his only hope is a job on the railway. But there’s still no one in the capital who can show you a better night on the piss than Karl Heinrich Marx.

— Bridge Theatre website

== Cast and characters ==
| Character | Bridge Theatre, London cast (2017) |
|---|---|
| Karl Marx | Rory Kinnear |
| Friedrich Engels | Oliver Chris |
| Jenny von Westphalen | Nancy Carroll |
| Nym | Laura Elphinstone |
| Schramm | Eben Figueiredo |
| Willich | Nicholas Burns |
| Gert "Doc" Schmidt | Tony Jayawardena |
| Barthélemy | Miltos Yerolemou |
| Fleece/Darwin | Duncan Wisbey |
| Grabiner/ Singe | Scott Karim |
| Mrs Mullet | Alana Ramsey |
| Librarian | Sophie Russell |
| Peter | Fode Simbo |
| Constable Crimp | William Troughton |
| Sergeant Savage | Joseph Wilkins |
