= Peter Caulfield (actor) =

English actor

- Born: 13 June 1984 (age 42); Boston, Lincolnshire, England
- Education: Liverpool Institute for Performing Arts
- Occupation: Actor

Peter Caulfield (born 13 June 1984) is an English actor.

== Training and early career ==
Caulfield trained at the Liverpool Institute for Performing Arts (the Paul McCartney "Fame" school). Whilst training he was part of a small theatre company, Hedgehog, led by director Jamie Lloyd. The company went on to win numerous awards at the National Student Drama Festival with their production of Falsettoland. The production then played to sold-out audiences at the Edinburgh Festival Fringe. Caulfield started his professional career in the West End. His first production was the musical Our House, with music by the band Madness and a script by Tim Firth. The show won a Laurence Olivier Award for Best New Musical. Caulfield can be seen playing the role of Lewis in the BBC Three TV recording of the show.

== TV and film ==
Caulfield appeared in episodes one and eight of Channel 4 drama Cucumber, and episode three of its spin-off Banana. He played Dahh-Ren in Doctor Who episode "Oxygen". He has a role in the 2018 feature film Strangeways Here We Come (series) Sherlock 2015. In March 2023, he began playing loan shark Shiv in the BBC One soap EastEnders. Then in September 2023, he appeared in fellow BBC One soap opera Doctors as George Fulton.

== Other work ==
Caulfield has performed as a singer at London venues such as the Trafalgar Hilton and the Pigalle Club, and has produced his own music night, "Peter Caulfield Presents", at the St. James Theatre, London on a regular basis. Caulfield sang as a lead vocalist on the charity single "We're All Human", which reached number one in the songwriting and folk iTunes charts and 30 in the overall iTunes charts in May 2014. Caulfield provides the English voice acting for the character Diallos in Elden Ring, a video game created by FromSoftware.

== Productions ==
1. Our House directed by Matthew Warchus at the Cambridge Theatre West End
2. A Funny Thing Happened on the Way to the Forum directed by Edward Hall for the National Theatre.
3. Lark Rise to Candleford adapted and co directed by Mike Bartlett (playwright) for the Finborough Theatre
4. The Wild Duck directed my Michael Grandage for the Donmar Warehouse
5. Elegies, Jamie Lloyd (director) at the Arts Theatre West End for a limited run only.
  Cast included Peter Caulfield, John Barrowman, Susannah Fellows, Ray Shell and Lauren Ward.
6. Aladdin at The Old Vic starring Ian McKellen
7. Man of Mode directed by Nicholas Hytner for the National Theatre
8. Follies directed by Laurie Sansom at the Royal and Derngate Northampton
9. The White Liars directed by Adam Penford at the Etcetera Theatre
10. Into the Woods by Stephen Sondheim for The Royal Opera House
11. Peter Pan: A Musical Adventure played Title Role of Peter Pan. Written by George Styles and Anthony Drew for the Birmingham Repertory Theatre
12. Eric's directed by Jamie Lloyd for the Liverpool Everyman
13. Enron Created the role of the siamese Lehman Brothers in a production directed by Rupert Goold for the Royal Court, West End and Chichester Festival Theatre
  (Rupert Goold was awarded the Evening Standard, Critics’ Circle and Olivier Awards for Best Director for Enron. Lucy Prebble the writer was nominated for the Olivier and Evening Standard Awards for Best New Play and in 2010 won the TMA Award for Best New Play. Enron was also nominated for the Olivier Awards for Best Set Design, Best Lighting Design, Best Actor (Sam West) and Best Supporting Actor, as well as for the Evening Standard Award for Best Actor also Sam West.) Enron was a 5 Star Hit in the West End but bombed on Broadway after just six weeks.
14. The Wind in the Willows and The Merchant of Venice both for Derby Live
15. Nicked. A production about Nick Clegg and the 2011 United Kingdom Alternative Vote referendum for the High Tide festival.
16. Me and My Girl at Kilworth House.
17. One Man, Two Guvnors National Theatre (UK Tour) Cast in the role of Alfie. Directed by Nicholas Hytner.
18. One Man, Two Guvnors National Theatre (West End) Directed by Adam Penford
