= Mark Rosenblatt =

British director and writer (born 1977/78)

- Born: 1977 or 1978 (age 48–49)
- Education: University of Oxford
- Spouse: Amy Abrahams (m. 2018)
- Children: 2
- Awards: Laurence Olivier Award for Best New Play
- Website: markrosenblatt.com

Mark Rosenblatt (born 1977 or 1978) is a British director, writer, and playwright, best known for his debut play Giant, which won three Laurence Olivier Awards including Best New Play.

== Early life and education ==
Mark Rosenblatt was born in 1977 or 1978 and grew up in a Jewish family in North London. His father Harvey's family emigrated from Belarus, and his mother Linda lost many relatives in the Holocaust. He has a younger brother named Jonathan. He attended St Paul's School, London (where he performed with Rory Kinnear) and the University of Oxford, later becoming an assistant director at the Oxford Stage Company.

== Career ==
Rosenblatt spent twenty-five years as a theatre director, with Giant being the first play he wrote, an experience he has deemed "extremely lucky". He has directed productions at numerous theatres, including Shakespeare's Globe, the National Theatre and the New National Theatre, Tokyo. Rosenblatt was appointed the associate director of the Leeds Playhouse in 2013, and went on to help develop new work at the National Theatre.

In 2019, Rosenblatt wrote and directed the short film Ganef, which qualified for the Academy Award for Best Live Action Short Film in 2022. He also co-wrote feature film Making Noise Quietly, which was released in 2019.

Rosenblatt's first play, Giant, follows Roald Dahl shortly after publishing an allegedly antisemitic review of the picture book God Cried. Rosenblatt has cited the discourse surrounding the inquiry into antisemitism in the British Labour Party as a motivator to explore Dahl's antisemitism. Looking for a playwright to develop the idea, he approached fellow director Nicholas Hytner for recommendations, but Hytner suggested that Rosenblatt write it himself.

Giant premiered in 2024 at the Royal Court Theatre (a theatre noted for accusations of antisemitism) before transferring to the Harold Pinter Theatre in the West End in 2025. The show later transferred to Broadway in 2026, with all productions starring John Lithgow as Dahl. The London production won three Laurence Olivier Awards from five nominations, and the Broadway production has received four nominations at the 79th Tony Awards.

Rosenblatt also serves as a facilitator of the Jewish Playwrights Programme, run by the Jewish Literary Foundation. As of June 2026, he is "under commission" with the Royal Court to write his next play.

== Personal life ==
Rosenblatt lives in North London with his wife, Amy Abrahams, and their two sons. Rosenblatt describes himself as a British Jew, and does not believe in God. In interviews with Haaretz and The Times, Rosenblatt has shared that despite his play Giant depicting the antisemitic views held by Roald Dahl, he still reads Dahl's children stories to his sons.

== Awards ==
Rosenblatt won the JMK Young Director Award in 1999, for his production of The Dybbuk.

Organisation	Year (Note: Indicates the year of the ceremony.)	Category	Nominated work	Result	Ref(s)
Critics’ Circle Theatre Awards	2025	Best New Play	Giant	Won	
Critics’ Circle Theatre Awards	2025	Most Promising Playwright	Giant	Won	
Laurence Olivier Awards	2025	Best New Play	Giant	Won	
The Stage Debut Awards	2025	Best Creative West End Debut	Giant	Won	
Outer Critics Circle Awards	2026	Outstanding New Broadway Play	Giant	Nominated	
Drama League Awards	2026	Outstanding Production of a Play	Giant	Nominated	
Dorian Theater Awards	2026	Outstanding Broadway Play	Giant	Nominated	
Tony Awards	2026	Best Play	Giant	Nominated	
