= Giant (play) =

2024 play by Mark Rosenblatt

- West End Promotional Poster
- Written by: Mark Rosenblatt

Premiere
- Date: 20 September 2024
- Place: Royal Court Theatre, London
- Directed by: Nicholas Hytner

Giant is a 2024 play written by Mark Rosenblatt. It premiered at the Royal Court Theatre, London, in 2024 in a production starring John Lithgow as Roald Dahl and won three Laurence Olivier Awards, including Best New Play.

== Summary ==
It is a dramatisation of a period in author Roald Dahl's life after his 1983 literary review of God Cried, a picture book about the siege of West Beirut by the Israeli army during the 1982 Lebanon War, was deemed antisemitic.

== Production history ==
=== Off-West End (2024) ===
The play premiered at the Royal Court Theatre on 20 September 2024, running until 16 November. The production was directed by Nicholas Hytner and designed by Bob Crowley with a cast including John Lithgow as Roald Dahl, Elliot Levey as Tom Maschler, Rachael Stirling as Felicity 'Liccy' Crosland, Tessa Bonham Jones as Hallie, Romola Garai as Jessie Stone, and Richard Hope as Wally Saunders. The London production earned three 2025 Olivier Awards, including Best New Play alongside acting wins for Lithgow and Levey.

=== West End (2025) ===
The play transferred to the Harold Pinter Theatre in the West End for 14 weeks from 26 April 2025, running until 2 August. Lithgow, Levey, and Stirling reprised their roles as Dahl, Maschler, and Crosland, respectively.

=== Broadway (2026) ===
The play transferred to Broadway in Spring 2026 with Lithgow reprising his role as Dahl. Elliot Levey, Rachael Stirling, and Aya Cash (who had replaced Romola Garai as Jessie Stone) also reprised their respective roles on Broadway. The show began previews on March 11, 2026 and officially opened on March 23 at the Music Box Theatre. The Broadway production was directed by two-time Tony Award winner Nicholas Hytner. It closed on June 28.

=== Theatrical screening (2026) ===
On 19 November 2026, the Harold Pinter Theatre version of the production will be released in 18 countries and over 900 cinemas worldwide. It was filmed in 2025, and marks the first time a Royal Court Theatre production will be screened theatrically.

== Cast and characters ==
Character	London	West End	Broadway
Character	2024	2025	2026
Roald Dahl	John Lithgow	John Lithgow	John Lithgow
Tom Maschler	Elliot Levey	Elliot Levey	Elliot Levey
Felicity 'Liccy' Crosland	Rachael Stirling	Rachael Stirling	Rachael Stirling
Hallie	Tessa Bonham Jones	Tessa Bonham Jones	Stella Everett
Jessie Stone	Romola Garai	Aya Cash	Aya Cash
Wally Saunders	Richard Hope	Richard Hope	David Manis

== Awards and nominations ==
=== London production ===
Year	Award	Category	Nominee	Result	Ref.
2025	Laurence Olivier Awards	Best New Play	Mark Rosenblatt	Won	
2025	Laurence Olivier Awards	Best Actor	John Lithgow	Won	
2025	Laurence Olivier Awards	Best Actor in a Supporting Role	Elliot Levey	Won	
2025	Laurence Olivier Awards	Best Actress in a Supporting Role	Romola Garai	Nominated	
2025	Laurence Olivier Awards	Best Director	Nicholas Hytner	Nominated	
2025	WhatsOnStage Awards	Best New Play		Nominated	
2025	WhatsOnStage Awards	Best Supporting Performer in a Play	Romola Garai	Nominated	

=== Broadway production ===
Year	Award	Category	Nominee	Result	Ref.
2026	Tony Awards	Best Play		Nominated	
2026	Tony Awards	Best Leading Actor in a Play	John Lithgow	Won	
2026	Tony Awards	Best Featured Actress in a Play	Aya Cash	Nominated	
2026	Tony Awards	Best Direction of a Play	Nicholas Hytner	Nominated	
2026	Drama Desk Awards	Outstanding Lead Performance in a Play	John Lithgow	Won	
2026	Drama League Awards	Outstanding Production of a Play		Nominated	
2026	Outer Critics Circle Award	Outstanding New Broadway Play		Nominated	
2026	Outer Critics Circle Award	Outstanding Lead Performer in a Broadway Play	John Lithgow	Nominated	
2026	Dorian Awards	Outstanding Broadway Play		Won	
2026	Dorian Awards	Outstanding Lead Performance in a Broadway Play	John Lithgow	Won	
2026	Dorian Awards	Outstanding Script of a Broadway Play	Mark Rosenblatt	Nominated	
