= Pitcairn (play) =

2014 play by Richard Bean

Pitcairn is a 2014 play by the English playwright Richard Bean, based on the 1788 mutiny aboard the ship Bounty and the subsequent colonisation of the Pitcairn Islands by the mutineers. It is a co-production between the Chichester Festival Theatre (at whose Minerva auditorium it will premiere from 22 August to 20 September 2014), Shakespeare's Globe (where it will transfer from 22 September to 11 October 2014) and Out of Joint.

After its Chichester and London runs, it went on a regional tour to the Plymouth Theatre Royal, the Warwick Arts Centre, the Yvonne Arnaud Theatre, Devonshire Park Theatre, the Oxford Playhouse and Malvern Theatres between 14 October and 22 November 2014.
