= England People Very Nice =

Play written by Richard Bean

England People Very Nice is a play by Richard Bean. It opened at the National Theatre in February 2009. The play, directed by Nicholas Hytner, is about four waves of immigrants - French Huguenot, Irish, Jewish and Bangladeshi - that have arrived in the district of Bethnal Green, East London, over the course of the last three hundred years.

== Controversy ==
During a talk at the theatre given by Mr. Bean on 28 February 2009, Keith Kinsella, a teacher at Blackfen School for Girls, and Hussain Ismail, a playwright, walked onto the stage carrying placards, protesting against what they called racist depictions of ethnic groups in the play. “Richard Bean is making it seem like all Bangladeshis are drug dealers or users, muggers and marry their cousins,” Mr. Ismail said.
