= Straight Line Crazy =

2020 play by David Hare

- Original production poster
- Original language: English
- Written by: David Hare
- Subject: History, architecture, New York City
- Genre: Drama
- Setting: 1920s–1960s New York City

Premiere
- Date: 16 March 2022
- Place: Bridge Theatre; London
- Directed by: Nicholas Hytner

Straight Line Crazy is a play written by David Hare. The play, set in the 1920s through the 1960s in New York City, centers on Robert Moses, the powerful "master builder" of parks, bridges, and expressways. The first production, directed by Nicholas Hytner and starring Ralph Fiennes as Moses, opened in previews at the Bridge Theatre in London on 16 March 2022 before officially premiering on 23 March 2022.

The play was shown in cinemas in association with National Theatre Live in fall 2022. The production made its New York stage debut off-Broadway at The Shed running from October to December in 2022.

== Plot ==
The show revolves around Robert Moses who, at the start of his career, was motivated by a determination to improve the lives of New York City’s workers. He created hundreds of playgrounds and parks, dozens of bridges, and more than 600 miles of expressways to connect people to the great outdoors.

He used a mix of charm and intimidation to manipulate the people and events in his favour including the Governor of New York Al Smith, portrayed in the play by Danny Webb. Though never elected to office, he served on the New York State Council of Parks and as the New York Secretary of State.

In the 1950s, grassroots groups of citizens began to organize against his schemes and against the motor car, campaigning for a very different idea of what a city was and for what it should be.

== Cast ==
Character	London	Off-Broadway
Character	2022	
Robert Moses	Ralph Fiennes	Ralph Fiennes
Mariah Heller	Alisha Bailey	Krysten Peck
Finnuala Connell	Siobhán Cullen	Judith Roddy
Carol Amis	Dani Moseley	Nemuna Ceesay
Ariel Porter	Samuel Barnett	Adam Silver
Henry Vanderbilt	Guy Paul	Guy Paul
Stamford Fergus	David Bromley	David Bromley
Lewis Mason	Ian Kirkby	Andrew Lewis
Jane Jacobs	Helen Schlesinger	Mary Stillwaggon Stewart
Sandy McQuade	Al Coppola	Al Coppola
Shirley Hayes	Alana Maria	Alana Maria
Nicole Savage	Mary Stillwaggon Stewart	Jennifer Regan
Governor Al Smith	Danny Webb	Danny Webb

== Productions ==
=== 2022 London ===
The play originated at the Bridge Theatre, London, written by David Hare, and directed by Nicholas Hytner starring Ralph Fiennes as Robert Moses. The production opened in previews on 16 March 2022 before officially premiering on 23 March, running until 18 June.

=== 2022 Off-Broadway ===
The play made its North American premiere Off-Broadway at The Shed. The production was directed jointly by Nicholas Hytner and Jamie Armitage with Fiennes returning as Robert Moses. Preview performances began on 18 October and the production opened on 26 October with performances through 18 December 2022.

== NT Live screenings ==
A performance of the play during its London run was recorded and screened in UK cinemas on 26 May 2022, and shown in international locations on 8 September 2022, through NTLive.

== Critical reception ==
Critical reception for the play has been mostly positive, in particular for the leading performance of Robert Moses by Ralph Fiennes. Variety declared, "Fiennes is all boldly convincing, controlled threat, his monomania teetering on the edge of malevolence". In The Guardian's five star rave review, critic Mark Lawson described Fiennes' performance as "enthralling" adding, "This is Hare’s most dramatically gripping and politically thoughtful play since The Absence of War three decades ago and provides another acting triumph for Fiennes". The New York Times called the play "sputtering" though "still a pleasure," and described Fiennes' performance as "gloriously entertaining."
