= Owain Arthur =

Welsh actor

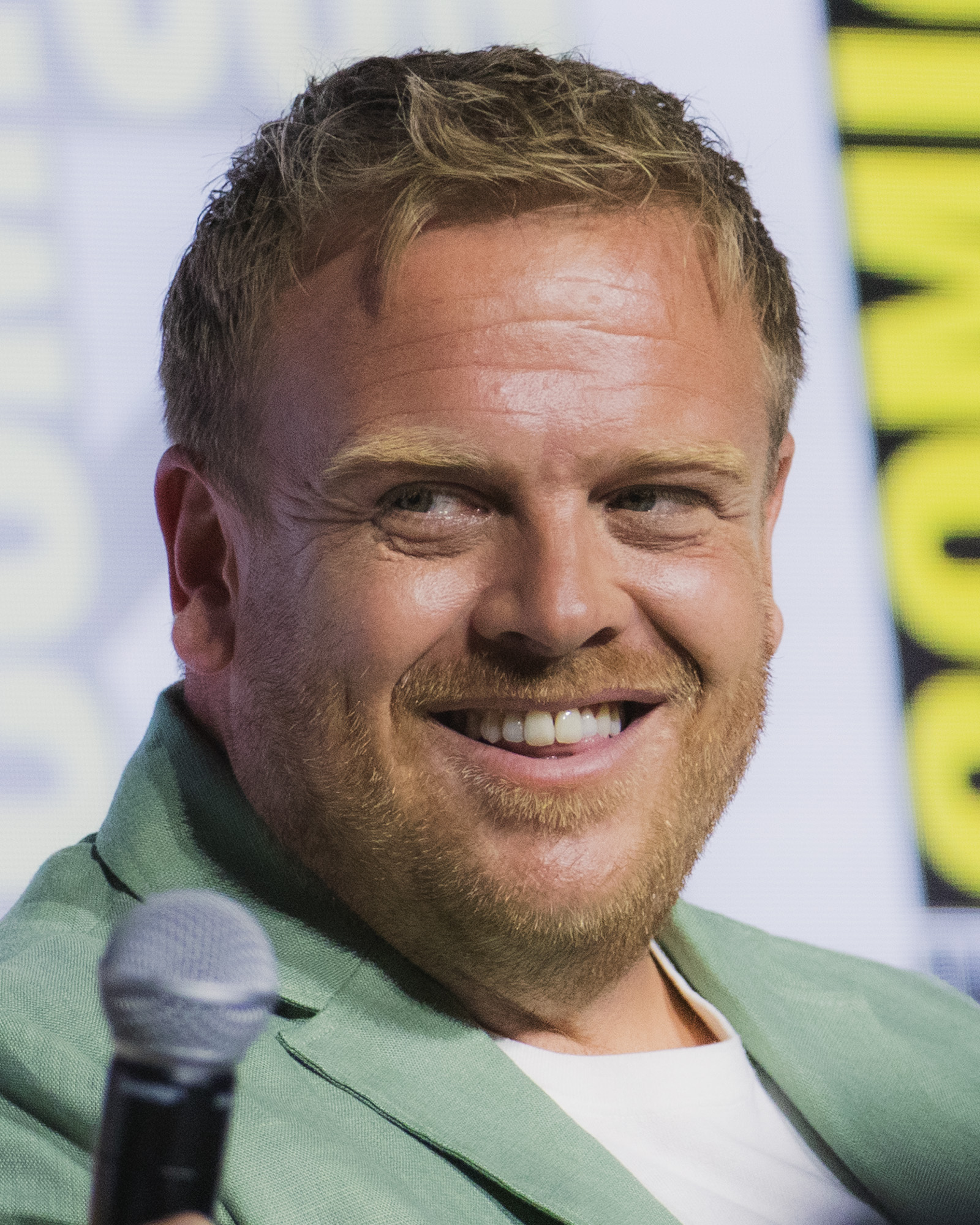
- Arthur in 2026
- Born: 5 March 1983 (age 43); Bangor, Wales
- Education: Guildhall School of Music and Drama
- Occupation: Actor
- Years active: 2000–present
- Notable work: One Man, Two Guvnors; Rownd a Rownd; The Lord of the Rings: The Rings of Power

Owain Arthur (born 5 March 1983) is a Welsh actor, who rose to fame playing Francis Henshall in The National Theatre's production of One Man, Two Guvnors at the Theatre Royal Haymarket.

His early years were spent in Bangor, Wales, filming the S4C series Rownd a Rownd, whilst attending the performing arts school, Ysgol Glanaethwy. Arthur then trained at the Guildhall School of Music and Drama in London.

He has played many roles in the theatre including Romeo and Juliet for the Royal Shakespeare Company, Comedy of Errors at the Royal Exchange Theatre and Birdsong at the Comedy Theatre. He has also worked extensively in UK TV roles.

He also voiced Lofty in the 2018 video game Ni no Kuni II: Revenant Kingdom.

Since 2022, he has played the Dwarven Prince Durin IV in The Lord of the Rings: The Rings of Power on Amazon Prime. Co-star Morfydd Clark mentioned enjoying speaking in Welsh on-set with Arthur and Trystan Gravelle.

In 2023, he played Nathan Detroit in the revival of Guys and Dolls at the Bridge Theatre from July to October before returning to the role in February 2024.

In 2026 he was cast as the voice of Red Leader in the Welsh dub of Star Wars: Episode IV - A New Hope.
