= One Man, Two Guvnors =

Play by Richard Bean, first performed in 2011

- Original language: English
- Written by: Richard Bean
- Based on: The Servant of Two Masters by Carlo Goldoni
- Genre: Comedy

Premiere
- Date: 24 May 2011
- Place: Lyttelton Theatre, Royal National Theatre, London

One Man, Two Guvnors is a play by Richard Bean, an English adaptation of The Servant of Two Masters (Italian: Il servitore di due padroni), a 1743 commedia dell'arte-style comedy play by the Italian playwright, Carlo Goldoni. The play replaces the Italian period setting of the original with Brighton in 1963. The play opened at the National Theatre in 2011, toured in the UK, and then opened in the West End in November 2011, with a subsequent Broadway opening in April 2012. The second tour was launched six months later, playing the UK, Hong Kong, Australia, and New Zealand. The second UK production in London closed in March 2014, before a fourth tour of the UK began in May 2014.

== Plot ==
In 1963 Brighton, out-of-work skiffle player Francis Henshall becomes separately employed by two men – Roscoe Crabbe, a gangster, and Stanley Stubbers, an upper class twit. Francis tries to keep the two from meeting, in order to avoid each of them learning that Francis is also working for someone else. Complicating events, Roscoe is really Rachel Crabbe in disguise, Roscoe's twin sister. Roscoe had been killed by Rachel's boyfriend, who is none other than Stanley. Complicating it further still is local mobster Charlie the Duck, who has arranged his daughter Pauline's engagement to Roscoe despite her preference for over-the-top amateur actor Alan Dangle. Even further complications are prompted by several letters, a very heavy trunk, several unlucky audience volunteers, an extremely elderly waiter and Francis' pursuit of his two passions: Charlie's feminist bookkeeper Dolly and a full stomach.

== Productions ==
=== National Theatre (2011) ===
The play premiered at the National Theatre's Lyttelton Theatre from 24 May 2011 (previews from 17 May) and continued until 19 September. Nicholas Hytner directed James Corden in the starring role of Francis Henshall, with associate director Cal McCrystal responsible for the physical comedy. The play contains songs written by Grant Olding and performed by "The Craze", in a "skiffle band" style. "The Craze" consisted of Grant Olding (lead vocals, guitar, keys, accordion, harmonica), Philip James (guitar, banjo, backing vocals), Richard Coughlan (double bass, electric bass, backing vocals) and Ben Brooker (percussion including washboard and spoons, drums, backing vocals). The music is written and composed by Grant Olding.

=== 1st UK tour (2011) ===
Following its engagement at the National in London, the play began its first national tour of UK prior to a West End engagement in the Autumn. Stops included Aylesbury Waterside Theatre (27 September–1 October), Plymouth Theatre Royal (4–8 October), The Lowry, Salford (11–15 October), Birmingham's New Alexandra Theatre (18–22 October) and the King's Theatre in Edinburgh (25–29 October).

=== West End (2011–14) ===
The show then made its West End debut at the Adelphi Theatre, with Corden still in the lead role. Previews began 8 November 2011, ahead of an opening night of 21 November. The run ended 25 February 2012 and subsequently transferred to the Theatre Royal Haymarket on 2 March 2012, with Corden's role being taken over by his first cover Owain Arthur.

Beginning performances 4 February 2013, Rufus Hound took over the title role, with Arthur returning to the role on 23 September 2013 after his run with the tour. Other replacements throughout the run would include Hugh Sachs as Harry Dangle, Angela Griffin as Dolly and Kellie Shirley as Pauline, reprising her role from the tour.

The London production concluded a three-year run on 1 March 2014. This came with the announcement that the show would return to tour the UK for a third time.

=== Broadway (2012) ===
The play then premiered on Broadway at the Music Box Theatre with an opening night of 18 April 2012, following previews from 6 April. James Corden reprised the role for American audiences.

The production received four nominations for the Outer Critics Circle Award: Outstanding New Broadway Play, Nicholas Hytner (Outstanding Director of a Play), James Corden (Outstanding Actor in a Play) and Tom Edden (Outstanding Featured Actor in a Play). Tom Edden went on to win the Outer Critics Circle Award for 'Outstanding Featured Actor in a Play.'

For the 66th Annual Tony Awards in 2012, the play received seven nominations: James Corden for Best Actor in a Play, Tom Edden for Best Featured Actor in a Play, Nicholas Hytner for Best Direction of a Play, Grant Olding for Best Original Score (Music and/or Lyrics) Written for the Theater, Mark Thompson for both Best Scenic Design of a Play and Best Costume Design of a Play and Paul Arditti for Best Sound Design of a Play. James Corden went on to win a Tony Award for Best Actor in a Play.

The limited engagement concluded 2 September 2012.

=== 2nd UK tour (2012–13) ===
A second UK touring production starring comedian Rufus Hound in the lead role, began 25 October 2012 at Curve in Leicester, on a run through 4 November. It then visited Theatre Royal, Newcastle (6–10 Nov), Glasgow Theatre Royal (13–17 Nov), Belfast Grand Opera (20–24 Nov), Blackpool Grand (27 Nov–1 Dec), Norwich Theatre Royal (4–8 Dec), Leeds Grand Theatre (11–15 Dec), Llandudno, Venue Cymru (2–5 Jan 2013), Salford The Lowry (8–19 Jan) and Cardiff Wales Millennium Centre (22–26 Jan), before ending with a run at Theatre Royal in Nottingham (29 Jan–2 Feb). Richie Hart, Philip Murray Warson, Oliver Seymour Marsh and Billy Stookes formed "The Craze" for this tour.

=== International tour (2013) ===
Following the second run of the UK, the production continued to tour to other countries from 25 February until 29 June 2013. Debuting at The Hong Kong Academy for Performing Arts in Hong Kong as part of the annual Hong Kong Arts Festival, the tour subsequently visited Her Majesty's Theatre in Adelaide, Australia, The Aotea Centre in Auckland, New Zealand, The Sydney Theatre in Sydney, Australia, before culminating at the Playhouse in Melbourne, Australia. Owain Arthur lead this cast, with his role in the London production being taken over by Rufus Hound.

=== 3rd UK tour (2014–2015) ===
Beginning performances 14 May 2014 at the Lyceum Theatre in Sheffield, One Man embarked on its third national tour of the UK. The final performance was in Wolverhampton on 21 March 2015.

=== Devonshire Park Theatre, Eastbourne 2017 ===
An Actor-Musician adaptation on the play featuring popular music of the 1960s began in June 2017 for a residence at Eastbourne's Devonshire Park Theatre. The final performance was on 22 July 2017.

=== New Victoria Theatre, Newcastle under Lyme 2024 ===
The play was featured at the New Vic Theatre , Newcastle-under-Lyme from April to May 2024, directed by Conrad Nelson. The production received enthusiastic reviews. The theatre-in-the-round format allowed all the audience to be close to the performers, and a number of the audience were briefly co-opted onto the stage. The final performance was on 11 May 2024.

=== Potential London revival ===
Original director Nicholas Hytner revealed in a 2023 interview that he and James Corden were planning a revival of the play following Corden's return to the UK after hosting The Late Late Show. According to Hytner, the revival will take place either at the Bridge Theatre, where Hytner serves as artistic director, or on the West End in late 2023 or early 2024. As of January 2026 the revival has not taken place.

== Casts (Original National Theatre production) ==
Character	National Theatre	UK Tour	West End (Adelphi)	Broadway	West End (Haymarket)	UK and International tour	UK tour	Melbourne Immersive
Character	2011-12			2012	2012-14	2012-13	2014-15	2026
Francis Henshall	James Corden	James Corden	James Corden	James Corden	Owain Arthur	Rufus Hound Owain Arthur	Gavin Spokes	Daragh Wills
Stanley Stubbers	Oliver Chris	Oliver Chris	Oliver Chris	Oliver Chris	Ben Mansfield	Edward Bennett	Patrick Warner	Johno White
Rachel Crabbe	Jemima Rooper	Jemima Rooper	Jemima Rooper	Jemima Rooper	Gemma Whelan	Rosie Wyatt	Alicia Davies	Zoe Rose
Dolly	Suzie Toase	Suzie Toase	Suzie Toase	Suzie Toase	Jodie Prenger	Amy Booth-Steel Jodie Prenger	Emma Barton	Sharon Wills
Charlie Clench	Fred Ridgeway	Fred Ridgeway	Fred Ridgeway	Fred Ridgeway	Gerard Horan	Colin Mace	Shaun Williamson Norman Pace	Andrew Roberts
Pauline Clench	Claire Lams	Claire Lams	Claire Lams	Claire Lams	Hannah Spearritt	Kellie Shirley	Jasmyn Banks	Emilie Toby
Alan Dangle	Daniel Rigby	Daniel Rigby	Daniel Rigby	Daniel Rigby	Daniel Ings	Leon Williams	Edward Hancock	Dylan Mazurek
Harry Dangle	Martyn Ellis	Martyn Ellis	Martyn Ellis	Martyn Ellis	Nigel Betts	Nick Caveliere	David Verrey	Mark Monroe
Lloyd Boateng	Trevor Laird	Trevor Laird	Trevor Laird	Trevor Laird	Derek Elroy	Mark Monero	Derek Elroy	Sujanthan Satkunarajah
Alfie	Tom Edden	Tom Edden	Tom Edden	Tom Edden	Martin Barrass	Peter Caulfield Mark Jackson	Michael Dylan	Tony Burge
Gareth	David Benson	David Benson	David Benson	Ben Livingston	David Benson	Matthew Woodyatt	Eliot Harper	BAND LEADER: Darcy Gurney

=== West End (Haymarket) replacements (2012-14) ===
- Francis Henshall – Rufus Hound, Owain Arthur
- Stanley Stubbers – Sam Alexander
- Alfie – Tom Edden, Peter Caulfield
- Rachel Crabbe – Amy Cudden
- Dolly – Angela Griffin
- Charlie Clench – Ian Burfield
- Pauline Clench – Kellie Shirley
- Alan Dangle – Dominic Thorburn
- Harry Dangle – Hugh Sachs

== Live broadcast ==
On 15 September 2011, the production was broadcast to cinemas around the world as a part of the British National Theatre Live program.

This recording was made available on YouTube for one week starting 2 April 2020, as the opening production of National Theatre at Home – a series of free broadcasts in response to the COVID-19 pandemic. It was watched by around 2.5 million viewers.

The play is also available to stream on Drama Online (with subscription).

== Critical reception ==
One Man, Two Guvnors received widespread critical acclaim. The Guardian gave it 5 stars, saying that it was "A triumph of visual and verbal comedy. One of the funniest productions in the National's history." The Daily Telegraph described it as "the feelgood hit of the Summer." The Independent wrote that it is a "massive hit" and London's Evening Standard as "a surefire hit". Blogging site Everything Theatre described it as "one of the most side-splittingly hilarious productions ever to be staged in London".

The show won Best Play at the Evening Standard Theatre Awards for 2011.

== Awards and nominations ==
=== Original Broadway production ===
Year	Award ceremony	Category	Nominee	Result
2012	Tony Award	Best Original Score	Grant Olding	Nominated
2012	Tony Award	Best Performance by a Leading Actor in a Play	James Corden	Won
2012	Tony Award	Best Performance by a Featured Actor in a Play	Tom Edden	Nominated
2012	Tony Award	Best Direction of a Play	Nicholas Hytner	Nominated
2012	Tony Award	Best Scenic Design in a Play	Mark Thompson	Nominated
2012	Tony Award	Best Costume Design in a Play	Mark Thompson	Nominated
2012	Tony Award	Best Sound Design in a Play	Paul Arditti	Nominated
2012	Drama Desk Award	Outstanding Music in a Play	Grant Olding	Won
2012	Drama Desk Award	Outstanding Actor in a Play	James Corden	Won
2012	Drama Desk Award	Outstanding Featured Actor in a Play	Tom Edden	Won
2012	Outer Critics Circle	Outstanding New Broadway Play		Won
2012	Outer Critics Circle	Outstanding Actor in a Play	James Corden	Won
2012	Outer Critics Circle	Outstanding Featured Actor in a Play	Tom Edden	Nominated
2012	Outer Critics Circle	Outstanding Director of a Play	Nicholas Hytner	Won
2012	Drama League Award	Distinguished Production of a Play		Nominated
