= Richard Bean =

English playwright (born 1956)

- Born: 11 June 1956 (age 70); Hull, England
- Occupations: playwright, screenwriter
- Writing career
- Genre: Drama

Richard Anthony Bean (born 11 June 1956) is an English playwright.

== Early years ==
Born in East Hull, Bean was educated at Hull Grammar School, and then studied social psychology at Loughborough University, graduating with a 2:1 BSc Hons. He then worked as an occupational psychologist, having previously worked in a bread plant for a year and a half after leaving school.

== Career ==
Between 1989 and 1994, Bean also worked as a comedian. He went on to be one of the writer-performers, with Andrew Clifford, Clive Coleman and Colin Swash, and performers Geraldine Fitzgerald and Mandy Knight, of the thriller sketch show Control Group Six (BBC Radio) which was nominated for a Writers Guild Award.

In 1995 he wrote the libretto for Stephen McNeff's opera Paradise of Fools, which premiered at the Unicorn Theatre.

His first full-length play, Of Rats and Men, set in a psychology lab, was staged at the Canal Cafe Theatre in 1988 and went on to the Edinburgh Festival. He adapted it for BBC Radio, starring Anton Lesser, and it was nominated for a Sony Award.

Bean wrote the films Harvest (2009) and The Duke (2020).

== Plays ==
- Of Rats and Men (1988) - premiered at the Canal Cafe Theatre
- Toast (1999) - premiered at the Royal Court Theatre, directed by Richard Wilson
- Mr England (2000) - premiered at the Crucible Theatre Sheffield, directed by Paul Miller
- The Mentalists (2002) - premiered at the National Theatre, directed by Sean Holmes
- The God Botherers (2003) - premiered at the Bush Theatre, directed by Will Kerley
- Smack Family Robinson (2003) - premiered at the Live Theatre, Newcastle upon Tyne, directed by Jeremy Herrin
- Under the Whaleback (2003) - premiered at the Royal Court Theatre, directed by Richard Wilson
- Honeymoon Suite (2004) - premiered at the Royal Court Theatre, directed by Paul Miller
- Harvest (2005) - premiered at the Royal Court Theatre, directed by Wilson Milam
- The Hypochondriac (2005) - a new version of Molière's play, premiered at the Almeida Theatre, directed by Lindsay Posner
- Up on Roof (2006) - premiered at the Hull Truck Theatre, directed by Gareth Tudor Price
- In the Club (2007) - premiered at the Hampstead Theatre, directed by David Grindley
- The English Game (2008) - premiered at the Yvonne Arnaud Theatre, Guildford, directed by Sean Holmes
- Pub Quiz Is Life (2009) - premiered at the Hull Truck Theatre, directed by Gareth Tudor Price
- England People Very Nice (2009) - premiered at the National Theatre, directed by Nicholas Hytner
- House of Games (2010) - an adaptation of the film by David Mamet, premiered at the Almeida Theatre, directed by Lindsay Posner
- The Big Fellah (2010) - premiered at the Lyric Hammersmith, directed by Max Stafford-Clark
- The Heretic (2011) - premiered at the Royal Court Theatre, directed by Jeremy Herrin
- One Man, Two Guvnors (2011) - premiered at the National Theatre, directed by Nicholas Hytner
- Great Britain (2014) - premiered at the Royal National Theatre, directed by Nicholas Hytner
- Pitcairn (2014) - premiered at the Chichester Festival Theatre, directed by Max Stafford-Clark
- Made in Dagenham (2014) - premiered at the Adelphi Theatre, directed by Rupert Goold
- The Nap (2016) - premiered at the Crucible Theatre - directed by Richard Wilson
- Kiss Me (2016) - premiered at the Hampstead Theatre, directed by Anna Ledwich
- The Hypocrite (2017) - premiered at Hull Truck Theatre and Royal Shakespeare Company, directed by Phillip Breen
- Young Marx (2017) - with Clive Coleman, premiered at the Bridge Theatre, directed by Nicholas Hytner
- Jack Absolute Flies Again (2022) - with Oliver Chris, premiered at the National Theatre, directed by Emily Burns
- 71 Coltman Street (2022) - premiered at the Hull Truck Theatre, directed by Mark Babych
- To Have and to Hold (2023) - premiered at the Hampstead Theatre, directed by Richard Wilson and Terry Johnson

== Awards ==
- Pearson Award 2002: Best New Play: Honeymoon Suite
- George Devine Award 2002: Best New Play: Under the Whaleback
- Olivier Awards 2005: Best New Play nomination for Harvest
- Evening Standard Awards 2005: Best New Play nomination for Harvest
- Critics' Circle Theatre Awards 2005: Best New Play: Harvest
- TMA Awards 2006: Best New Play nomination for Up on Roof
- Evening Standard Awards 2011: Best New Play The Heretic and One Man, Two Guvnors (both plays joint winners)
- Critics' Circle Theatre Awards 2011: Best New Play One Man, Two Guvnors

== Personal life ==
Richard is married to Sonia Saville.
