= Chambers (series) =

BBC radio and television sitcom

- Genre: Sitcom; Legal drama
- Running time: 30 minutes
- Country of origin: United Kingdom
- Language: English
- Home station: BBC Radio 4
- Syndicates: BBC Radio 7
- TV adaptations: Chambers
- Starring: John Bird; Sarah Lancashire; Lesley Sharp; James Fleet; Jonathan Kydd
- Written by: Clive Coleman
- Produced by: Paul Schlesinger
- Original release: 17 April 1996 – 30 March 1999
- No. of series: 3
- No. of episodes: 14

Chambers
- Written by: Clive Coleman
- Directed by: John Stroud; Gareth Carrivick
- Starring: John Bird; Sarah Lancashire; Nina Wadia; James Fleet; Jonathan Kydd
- Composer: Jody Talbot
- Country of origin: United Kingdom
- Original language: English
- No. of series: 2
- No. of episodes: 12

Production
- Executive producer: Geoffrey Perkins
- Producer: Paul Schlesinger
- Running time: 30 minutes

Original release
- Network: BBC One
- Release: 15 June 2000 – 2 September 2001

Chambers is a BBC radio and television sitcom. It was written by barrister Clive Coleman and starred John Bird, Sarah Lancashire, James Fleet and Jonathan Kydd in both versions. The radio version was broadcast on BBC Radio 4 in three series between 1996 and 1999, and the television version was broadcast on BBC One. The theme music was "Dance with Mandolins" from Prokofiev's Romeo and Juliet.

== Premise ==
John Fuller-Carp (John Bird) is the monstrously egotistical and avaricious barrister heading Forecourt Chambers. His colleagues are Hilary Tripping (James Fleet), a rather ineffectual young man, Ruth Quirke (Lesley Sharp, later Sarah Lancashire), initially a rather militantly left wing feminist, and Vince Griffiths (Jonathan Kydd), the worldly-wise barristers' clerk. After Lesley Sharp left the role after the first radio series and Sarah Lancashire took over, Ruth became more of a comic neurotic, but many of the 'original' Ruth's harder characteristics were later given to the character who replaced her in the second television series, Alex Kahn (Nina Wadia).

== Radio ==
=== Main cast ===
- John Bird as John Fuller-Carp
- James Fleet as Hilary Tripping
- Lesley Sharp as Ruth Quirke (Series 1)
- Sarah Lancashire as Ruth Quirke (Series 2 & 3)
- Jonathan Kydd as Vince Griffiths

=== Guest cast ===
Guest actors included David Harewood, Rebecca Front, Ben Crowe, Joanna Monro, Geoffrey Whitehead, Peter Gunn, Tilly Gaunt, Natalie Walter, Simon Greenall, John Rowe and Emma Clarke and Jeremy Clyde

=== Episodes ===
All episodes were written by Clive Coleman.

==== Series 1 ====
No. in series	Title	Original air date
1	Chambers	17 April 1996
2	The Right to Silence	24 April 1996
3	The Cab Rank Rule	1 May 1996
4	Trial by Television	8 May 1996
5	The American	15 May 1996

==== Series 2 ====
No. in series	Title	Original air date
1	Only the Lonely	11 May 1998
2	The Masons	18 May 1998
3	The Phantom Barrister	25 May 1998
4	A Case with a View	1 June 1998
5	Conditional Fees	8 June 1998

==== Series 3 ====
No. in series	Title	Original air date
1	Rent Arrears	9 March 1999
2	A Pain in the Back	16 March 1999
3	Outward Bound	23 March 1999
4	It's Only Words	30 March 1999

== Television ==
=== Main cast ===
- John Bird as John Fuller-Carp
- Sarah Lancashire as Ruth Quirke (Series 1) (2000)
- Nina Wadia as Alex Kahn (Series 2) (2001)
- James Fleet as Hilary Tripping
- Jonathan Kydd as Vince Griffiths

=== Guest cast ===
Guest actors included Elizabeth Berrington, John Leslie, Sara Stewart, Geoffrey Whitehead, Martin Trenaman, Robert Duncan, Roger Allam, Jeremy Clyde, John Hodgkinson, John Rowe, Robert Duncan and Donald Gee.

=== Episodes ===
All episodes were written by Clive Coleman, and directed by John Stroud (series 1) and Gareth Carrivick (series 2).

==== Series 1 ====
No. in series	Title	Original air date
1	It's Only Words	15 June 2000
2	Trial by Television	22 June 2000
3	Rent Arrears	29 June 2000
4	Phantom Barrister	6 July 2000
5	The Masons	13 July 2000
6	Only the Lonely	20 July 2000

==== Series 2 ====
No. in series	Title	Original air date
1	Conditional Fees	22 July 2001
2	Survival Trek	29 July 2001
3	The Bomb Scare	5 August 2001
4	A Pain in the Back	19 August 2001
5	The Bequest	26 August 2001
6	A Case with a View	2 September 2001
