= The Southbury Child =

- Original language: English
- Written by: Stephen Beresford

Premiere
- Date: 13 June 2022
- Place: Chichester Festival Theatre

The Southbury Child is a play by Stephen Beresford.

== Production history ==
The play premiered at the Chichester Festival Theatre running from 13 June to 25 June, before transferring to the Bridge Theatre, London running from 1 July to 27 August 2022. It is directed by Nicholas Hytner and stars Alex Jennings as David Highland.

== Cast and characters ==
Character	Chichester / London (2022)
David Highland	Alex Jennings
Joy Sampson	Holly Atkins
Lee Southbury	Josh Finan
Craig Collier	Jack Greenlees
Janet Oram	Hermione Guillford
Susannah Highland	Jo Herbert
Mary Highland	Phoebe Nicholls
Naomi Highland	Racheal Ofori
Tina Southbury	Sarah Twomey
u/s David Highland	Nick Barclay
u/s Susannah Highland & Joy Sampson	Amy Brown
u/s Mary Highland & Janet Oram	Hilary Derrett
u/s Lee Southbury & Craig Collier	Chris Knight
u/s Mary Highland & Naomi Highland	Lola May

== Critical reception ==
The play opened to positive reviews from critics.
