= Catherine Leroy =

French-born American photojournalist (1944–2006)

- Born: August 27, 1944; Paris, France
- Died: July 8, 2006 (aged 61); Santa Monica, California
- Website: dotationcatherineleroy.org

Catherine Leroy (August 27, 1944 – July 8, 2006) was a French-born photojournalist and war photographer, whose stark images of battle illustrated the story of the Vietnam War in the pages of Life magazine and other publications.

== Early life ==
Leroy was born in the suburbs of Paris on August 27, 1944. She attended a Catholic boarding school and, to impress her boyfriend, earned a parachutist's license at the age of 18. After being moved by images of war she had seen in Paris Match, she decided to travel to South Vietnam to "give war a human face." At the age of 21 she booked a one-way ticket to South Vietnam in 1966, with just one Leica M2 and $200 in her pocket.

== Career ==
Upon her arrival in Saigon in 1966, Leroy met the photographer Horst Faas, bureau chief of the Associated Press. A year later she became the first accredited journalist to participate in a combat parachute jump on 23 February 1967, joining the 173rd Airborne Brigade in Operation Junction City. She was so small and thin that she had to be weighed down so as not to be blown away during the jump. She had her press credentials temporarily suspended after she swore at a Marine officer who she felt was condescending in denying her request to jump shortly after Operation Junction City.

During the battle for Hill 881 on 30 April 1967 she took a series of photos of U.S. Navy Corpsman Vernon Wike tending to a dying Marine which were published in Life to critical acclaim. In the pictures Wike is crouched in tall grass cradling a Marine who has been shot while smoke from the battle rises into the air behind them. In the first frame Wike has two hands on the Marine's chest, trying to stanch the wound. In the second, he is trying to find a heartbeat. In the third frame, "Corpsman In Anguish", he has just realised the man is dead.

On 19 May 1967, while photographing Operation Hickory with a Marine unit near the Vietnamese Demilitarized Zone, she was severely injured by People's Army of Vietnam (PAVN) mortar fire. Leroy would later credit a camera with saving her life by stopping some of the shrapnel. She was evacuated first to Con Thien, then to the USS Sanctuary, where she was visited by III Marine Amphibious Force commander General Lew Walt. She was then transferred to a hospital in Danang and discharged in mid-June.

In September 1967 she photographed the siege of Con Thien. In October 1967 she visited her family in Paris and flew back via New York where she signed a contract with the Black Star photo agency.

In 1968, during the Tet Offensive, Leroy and Agence France-Presse journalist Francois Mazure were captured by PAVN soldiers during the Battle of Huế. She managed to talk her way out and emerged as the first newsperson to take photographs of PAVN soldiers behind their own lines. The subsequent story made the cover of Life.

In early 1968 she was awarded the George Polk Award by the Overseas Press Club for her photos on Hill 881, becoming the first freelancer and first woman to win the award. At the awards ceremony in early April in New York she used her acceptance speech to berate the Associated Press which she accused of losing her negatives, which spoiled her relationship with AP and Horst Faas. Returning to South Vietnam in May she struggled to regain her momentum, losing the drive for fieldwork:

When you look at war photographs, it's a silent moment of eternity. But for me, it is haunted by sound, a deafening sound. In Vietnam, most of the time it was extremely boring. Exhausting and boring. You walked for miles through rice paddies or jungle -- walking, crawling, in the most unbearable circumstances. And nothing was happening. And then suddenly all hell would break loose.

— Catherine Leroy, "A window on the war", Los Angeles Times, December 8, 2002

Her last major Vietnam photo essay This is That War was published in Look magazine on 14 May 1968 in the same issue where the editors changed policy to denounce the war.

Leroy returned to Paris from South Vietnam in mid December 1968. In August 1969 she accepted an assignment from Look to cover the Woodstock festival but on the first day decided to join the crowd and spent the subsequent months travelling and doing drugs with Vietnam veterans she had met there.

In August 1972 she and Frank Cavestani began filming Operation Last Patrol, a film about Ron Kovic and the anti-war Vietnam veterans and their protests at the 1972 Republican National Convention in Miami Beach. The film inspired Kovic to write his autobiography Born on the Fourth of July.

She returned to Saigon in mid-April 1975 not as a reporter, but to witness the Fall of Saigon. On 30 April she and Françoise Demulder photographed the PAVN entering the city, with Demulder taking the iconic photo of a tank crashing through the gate of the Independence Palace.

While covering the Lebanese Civil War in 1976 she began a relationship with Agence France-Presse reporter Bernard Estrade. Estrade was posted to Hanoi and in 1980 Leroy spent two months travelling around the country photographing for the fifth anniversary of the end of the war. From 1977 to 1986 she covered conflicts in Northern Ireland, Cyprus, Somalia, Afghanistan, Iraq, Iran and Libya for Time stopping war photography in the early 1990s.

Leroy originally sold her work to United Press International and the Associated Press, and later worked for Sipa Press and Gamma. In 1983, Leroy co-authored the book God Cried, about the siege of West Beirut by the Israeli army during the 1982 Lebanon War.

== Retirement ==
She lived in the Hotel Chelsea in the late 1980s. Later in life, she founded and ran a vintage clothing store, Piece Unique, with a website. Piece Unique also hosted an online gallery of images from the Vietnam War, entitled "Under Fire: Images From Vietnam".

In 2005 Paris-Match sent her to Arizona for a reunion with Vernon Wike in what would be her last photo assignment.

She died in Santa Monica, California, one week after being diagnosed with lung cancer.

== Awards ==
Leroy won numerous awards for her work, including in 1967 the George Polk Awards, Picture of the Year, The Sigma Delta Chi, and The Art Director's Club of New York. She was the first woman to receive the Robert Capa Gold Medal Award – "best published photographic reporting from abroad requiring exceptional courage and enterprise" – for her coverage of the civil war in Lebanon, in 1976. In 1997, she was the recipient of an Honor Award for Distinguished Service in Journalism from the University of Missouri.

== Works ==
- Catherine Leroy, ed. (2005). Under fire: great photographers and writers in Vietnam. Random House. ISBN 978-1-4000-6358-1.
- Tony Clifton; Catherine Leroy (1983). God Cried. Quartet Books. ISBN 978-0-7043-2375-9.
