= Joyce Hytner =

British theatrical fundraiser (born 1935)

Joyce Hytner OBE
- Born: Joyce Anita Myers; December 1935 (age 90)
- Occupation: Fundraiser
- Known for: Theatrical fundraising
- Spouse: Benet Hytner (m. 1954; died 2023)
- Children: 4, including Sir Nicholas Hytner

Joyce Anita Hytner OBE (née Myers; born December 1935) is a British theatrical fundraiser who previously served on the board of the Old Vic, the Royal Court Theatre, the Criterion Theatre, the Quintessentially Foundation, Manchester International Festival. She founded and leads fundraising consultancy Act IV.

== Early life ==
Joyce Anita Myers was born to Bernard Myers and Vera Myers (née Classick).

== Career ==
Hytner once worked as a publicist for Granada Television.

== Personal life ==
Hytner was married to retired barrister Benet Hytner until his death in 2023; they had four children: Nicholas, Jenny, Richard and James.

== Awards ==
- 2004 OBE for services to the arts
