= God Cried =

1983 book by T. Clifton and C. Leroy

God Cried is a 1983 book by Tony Clifton and Catherine Leroy about the Israeli siege and bombing of Beirut during the 1982 Lebanon War.

== Writing and publication ==
God Cried was a collaboration between Tony Clifton, an Australian journalist, and Catherine Leroy, a French photographer. The two had lived in Beirut since 1975. Clifton wrote the book, while Leroy contributed photographs. While on a promotional tour for the book, Clifton said that he chose to collaborate with Leroy out of hopes that her photography would provide irrefutable support for his narrative.

Quartet Books published God Cried in 1983.

== Content ==
The book was focused on the Israeli siege and bombing of Beirut during the 1982 Lebanon War, but documented the city from the outbreak in 1975 of a Civil War. In the book's opening pages, Clifton wrote that the book was biased against Israel's government, saying that "God Cried is not objective and could never have been." Clifton compared actions of the Israel armed forces to those of Nazis in the Second World War.

== Reception ==
Writing in The Middle East Journal, Loren Jenkins described God Cried as "powerful, moving, and important", praising the human face it put on suffering on the Middle East. However, Jenkins felt that Clifton's repeated criticism of Israel's government meant that it would "be too casually dismissed by those who continue to believe that Israel can do no evil in the Middle East." Erich Isaac and Rael Jean, reviewing the book for Quadrant, critiqued the writing and photography as presenting the 1982 conflict as being waged between a clear group of "good guys" (PLO fighters) and "bad guys" (Israelis), and not conveying possible justifications for the Israeli invasion. Isaac and Jean wrote that the book was valuable for how it demonstrated what they considered a broader bias of journalists against Israel.

A 1983 review of the book by Roald Dahl, published in the Literary Review, caused a "small outcry." Under the title "Not a Chivalrous Affair," Dahl compared the then-current war in Lebanon (which he described as "deliberate mass murder") to Dahl's own service in Palestine during WWII. Remarking on the "authentic tales of horror and bestiality throughout this book," Dahl asked of the war, "[W]hy in heaven’s name did not somebody influential in America shout 'Stop'[? ...] Is the American President and the Senate and the Congress so utterly dominated by the great Jewish financial institutions over there that they dare not defy them?" Dahl concluded that "on the whole [...] the great Jewish communities outside Israel cared very little about what was going on [in Lebanon]," and rhetorically asked: "Must Israel, like [Nazi] Germany, be brought to her knees before she learns how to behave in this world?" The review was widely perceived as antisemitic, a perception only deepened by Dahl's subsequent public statements in defense of his position. Events surrounding the reception of this review were dramatized in Mark Rosenblatt's 2024 play Giant.
