= Jack Absolute Flies Again =

Play by Richard Bean and Oliver Chris

- Written by: Richard Bean; Oliver Chris
- Based on: The Rivals by Richard Brinsley Sheridan
- Genre: Comedy
- Setting: July 1940

Premiere
- Place premiered: Olivier Theatre, National Theatre, London

Jack Absolute Flies Again is a play by Richard Bean and Oliver Chris, based on Richard Brinsley Sheridan's 1775 play The Rivals, a comedy of manners.

== Production history ==
The play was scheduled to make its world premiere in the Olivier Theatre at the National Theatre in London from April to July 2020. However, due to the COVID-19 pandemic, all scheduled performances were cancelled and the production postponed, not joining the repertoire in either 2020 or 2021.

The play finally premiered on 9 August 2022, running until 9 September, directed by Emily Burns (replacing Thea Sharrock who was originally due to direct), with set and costumes by Mark Thompson, lighting designed by Tim Lutkin (replacing Bruno Poet), music composed by Paul Englishby (replacing Adrian Johnston) with a cast including Caroline Quentin as Mrs Malaprop, Peter Forbes as Sir Anthony Absolute (replacing James Fleet) and Kelvin Fletcher as Dudley Scunthorpe (replacing Richard Fleeshman).

== Awards and nominations ==
In 2023, Quentin received a Laurence Olivier Award nomination for Laurence Olivier Award for Best Actress in a Supporting Role.
