= Leon Williams (actor) =

British actor

Leon Williams is a British actor, who has performed at Shakespeare's Globe open air theatre Regent’s Park the National Theatre, The Peter hall company and many theatre companies across the Uk.

His performance as Flute in A Midsummer Night's Dream at The Rose Theatre, Kingston, which also starred Judi Dench, was met with critical acclaim. He is also known for his 2011 hit performance of Private Peaceful by Michael Morpurgo at the Edinburgh Festival which went on to tour globally

Williams was nominated for best actor at the M.E.N awards for his performance of Pip in Great expectations at Manchester library theatre directed by Roger Haines. He also appeared in Phoebe Eclair-Powell's debut play WINK at the Theatre 503. Wink review – debut play explores what it means to be a real man He trained at The Guildhall School of Music & Drama in London.

He has also worked for BBC Television, with roles on Call the Midwife New Tricks. And Shakespeare & Hathaway Shakespeare & Hathaway - Private Investigators Series 2, Episode 10 - Too Cold For Hell alongside mark benton. For channel 4 he featured in pilot Ford & Akram, and drop the dead donkey.

He plays the estate agent in the short film Spectre.

Williams has voiced many cartoons including the 52 part Australian series Tashi Tashi (TV Series 2014– ) - IMDb and has narrated over a dozen audio books winning the earphones award for his narration of the goldfish boy.https://www.audiofilemagazine.com/reviews/read/124650/the-goldfish-boy-by-lisa-thompson-read-by-leon-williams/
