= Benet Hytner =

English barrister and judge (1927–2023)

Benet Hytner KC
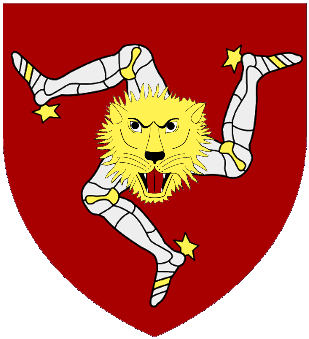
- Shield of arms as displayed in the Middle Temple.
- Born: Benet Alan Hytner; 29 December 1927
- Died: 7 February 2023 (aged 95)
- Spouse: Joyce Myers (m. 1954)
- Children: 4, including Sir Nicholas Hytner

Benet Alan Hytner KC (29 December 1927 – 7 February 2023) was an English barrister and judge. He was Judge of Appeal of the Isle of Man. He was the Head of the Byrom Street Chambers in Manchester and 42 Bedford Row in London. He practiced principally in General Common Law.

Hytner was born on 29 December 1927 to Maurice and Sarah Hytner. Hytner was called to the Bar in 1952 by Middle Temple and became a Queen's Counsel in 1970. He was a Crown Court Recorder 1971–1996, Deputy High Court Judge 1974–1997, Judge of Appeal of the Isle of Man 1980–1997 and elected Leader of the Northern Circuit 1980–1984. He also served both on Bar Council and Senate of Inns of Court and Bar.

== Personal life and death ==
Hytner married Joyce Myers in 1954. Their children are Sir Nicholas Hytner, Director of the National Theatre in London 2003–2015, Jenny Hytner-Marriott, Director of The Paw Seasons, Richard Hytner, worldwide deputy chairman of Saatchi & Saatchi, and James Hytner, Global COO of IPG Mediabrands.

Hytner died on 7 February 2023, at the age of 95.
