= Harriet Lane (author) =

British author

- Education: Bedales School
- Alma mater: University of Leeds
- Occupations: Writer and journalist
- Writing career
- Language: English
- Genre: Psychological thriller

Harriet Lane is an English novelist and journalist. She is the author of the psychological thrillers Alys, Always (2012), Her (2014), and Other People's Fun (2025). Her journalism has appeared in The Observer, The Guardian, Vogue and Tatler.

== Life and career ==
She studied at Bedales School, and University of Leeds.

In April 2008, Lane began having problems with her sight. She now has no sight in her left eye and problems with her peripheral vision in her right.

Lane's first novel, Alys, Always, is a psychological thriller and was published in 2012. She began working on the novel after she took a break from journalism due to her problems with her sight. Lane's second novel, Her, was published in 2014 and is also a psychological thriller. Her third novel, Other People's Fun was published in 2025.

== Bibliography ==
- Lane, Harriet (2012). Alys, Always. Scribner. ISBN 978-1451673166.
- Lane, Harriet (2015). Her. Little, Brown and Company. ISBN 978-0316369879.
- Lane, Harriet (4 November 2025). Other People's Fun. New York: Little, Brown and Company. ISBN 978-0-316-36994-7.
