= Clive Coleman =

Clive Coleman (born October 1961) is an English barrister playwright, film and sitcom writer and journalist. From 2010 to 2020, he was the BBC News Legal Correspondent.

Coleman qualified as a barrister in 1986 and practised until 1990 when he became a lecturer on the bar vocational course and began writing. He wrote for the sitcom Hair In The Gate and the TV comedy series Spitting Image, and Dead Ringers. He also contributed to The Bill and Crossroads; and wrote the comedy drama High Table starring Dawn French. Coleman wrote the sitcom Chambers, which ran on the radio for three series before moving to TV. He collaborated with Richard Bean on the plays Great Britain (2014) and the play Young Marx (2017). The pair also wrote the film The Duke, released in 2022.

From 2004 to 2010, Coleman presented the BBC Radio 4 legal analysis programme Law in Action. In 2010 Coleman became the BBC's Legal Correspondent. He also has presented other BBC programmes including Panorama BBC 1, 2009 The Death of Kiss and Tell, and Pick of the Week, Profile, and The Cases That Changed Our World on Radio 4. Coleman has also been a columnist for The Times, and has also written for The Guardian and The Independent.

== Early life and education ==
Coleman was born in October 1961 and grew up in North London. He attended Dame Alice Owen's School and then University College School.

Coleman studied English Literature at York University from 1981 to 1984. After graduating, he took a law conversion course before taking the bar exams in 1985 to qualify as a barrister. He was called to the Bar of England and Wales in 1986.

== Career ==
=== Law ===
Coleman first practised from the chambers of Robin Stewart QC. He worked in criminal law, both for the defence and the Crown Prosecution Service. He also practised civil law (e.g. insolvency, medical negligence and property). In 1990, he left full-time practice to teach part of the bar vocational course at the Inns of Court School of Law, becoming a principal lecturer.

=== Writing ===
The move into education allowed Coleman time to develop his creative writing career. He started making regular contributions to radio series Weekending and The News Huddlines, wrote the sitcom Hair In The Gate which starred Alistair McGowan.

He went on to be one of the writer-performers, with Richard Bean, Andrew Clifford, and Colin Swash, and performers Geraldine Fitzgerald and Mandy Knight, of the thriller sketch show Control Group Six (BBC Radio) which was nominated for a Writers Guild Award.

He then contributed to television comedy series Spitting Image, and Dead Ringers. Coleman also contributed to ITV series including The Bill (for whom he has also acted as storyline consultant), and Crossroads; and wrote the comedy drama High Table starring Dawn French for Tiger Aspect/BBC.

Coleman wrote the sitcom Chambers, set in what was described as "perhaps the country's least spectacular law chambers". Launched on BBC Radio 4 in 1996, ran for three series, before transferring to BBC One for two hit television series, using many of the same scripts in a different order for its 12 episodes. The series starred John Bird, James Fleet, Jonathan Kydd and Sarah Lancashire.

In 2014, he collaborated with Richard Bean on the play Great Britain. In 2017, he co-wrote the play Young Marx also with Richard Bean. The biographical comedy about the chaotic life of the young Karl Marx, was directed by Nicholas Hytner and starred Rory Kinnear. It was the premiere production which opened London's new Bridge Theatre in October 2017.

In 2020, Coleman, again working with Bean, wrote the film The Duke, released in 2022. It tells the story of Kempton Bunton, a Newcastle cab driver prosecuted for the 1961 theft of Francisco Goya's portrait of the Duke of Wellington from the National Gallery in London. Directed by Roger Michell, it stars Jim Broadbent as Bunton, Dame Helen Mirren as his wife Dorothy and Fionn Whitehead as their son Jackie. Co-stars include Matthew Goode, Anna Maxwell-Martin and Sian Clifford. It premiered at the 2020 Venice Film festival, receiving 5 star reviews in The Guardian, The Telegraph and The Daily Mail.

=== Journalism ===
From 2004 to 2010, Coleman presented the BBC Radio 4 legal analysis programme Law in Action. In 2009 he won the Bar Council Legal Broadcasting Award for a programme on the controversial legal doctrine of ‘joint enterprise’.

In 2010 Coleman became the BBC's Legal Correspondent covering major domestic and international legal stories across the BBC news output on television, radio and online. These included phone hacking, the Hillsborough Inquest verdicts, disclosure failings in the criminal justice system, the courts backlog, GDPR and the release of the London Bridge bomber Usman Khan.

In 2019, he won the Bar Council Legal Broadcasting Award for coverage of the UK Supreme Court case which decided that the Prime Minister Boris Johnson's advice to the Queen to prorogue parliament was unlawful. In a piece following the death of his sister Sarah, a lifelong non-smoker, from lung cancer Coleman won the 2018 GLCC (Global Lung Cancer Coalition) Cancer Journalism Award for excellence in lung cancer journalism.

He has presented a raft of other BBC programmes including Panorama BBC 1, 2009 The Death of Kiss and Tell, and Pick of the Week, Profile, and The Cases That Changed Our World on Radio 4.

Coleman has also been a columnist for The Times, and has also written for The Guardian and The Independent.

== Awards and honours ==
Coleman holds an honorary Doctorate of Laws from the University of West London. In 2018, he was made an Honorary Bencher of the Middle Temple. Both recognise his work as a legal journalist.

Coleman has also won the following awards:

- 1992: BBC Radio Light Entertainment Contract Writers Award
- 1994: Writers' Guild nomination for Control Group Six
- 1998: inaugural BBC Frank Muir Award for comedy writing, co-winner with Tony Roche
- 2009: Bar Council’s Legal Broadcasting Award (for Law in Action)
- 2018: Bar Council Legal Broadcasting Award (as part of team for coverage of disclosure crisis in the Criminal Justice System).
- 2018 GLCC (Global Lung Cancer Coalition) Cancer Journalism Award for excellence in lung cancer journalism.
- 2019: Bar Council Legal Broadcasting Award (for his BBC News coverage of the 2019 Supreme Court Prorogation Case).
