= Bridge Theatre =

Theatre in London, England

- The Bridge

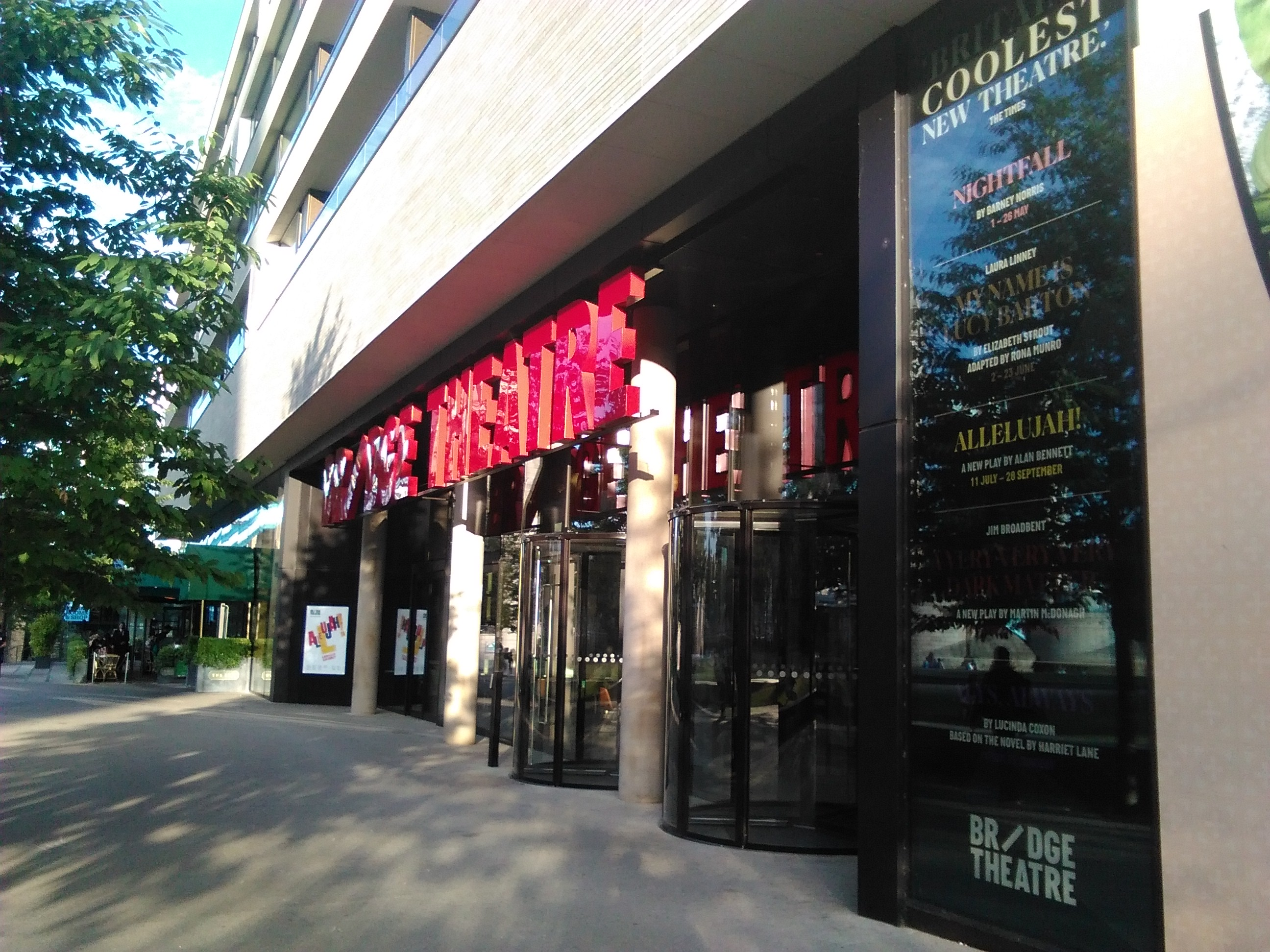
- Interactive map of Bridge Theatre
- Address: 3 Potters Fields Park; London, SE1; United Kingdom
- Coordinates: 51.5041°N 0.0776°W
- Operator: The London Theatre Company
- Capacity: 900 (seated), 1,100 (promenade)
- Type: Commercial producing theatre
- Event: Theatre
- Production: The Oresteia
- Public transit: London Bridge

Construction
- Opened: 18 October 2017; 8 years ago
- Cost: £11.6 million
- Architect: Haworth Tompkins Architects
- Project manager: Plann
- Structural engineer: Momentum Engineering
- Services engineers: Skelly & Couch
- Main contractor: Rise Contracts

Website
- bridgetheatre.co.uk

The Bridge Theatre is a commercial theatre near Tower Bridge in London that opened in October 2017. It was developed by Nick Starr and Nicholas Hytner as the home of the London Theatre Company, which they founded following their tenancy as executive director and artistic director, respectively, at the National Theatre.

The venue has a food and beverage partnership with the Michelin star St. John and is known for its madeleines, which are baked in house. It was reported that the theatre cost £12 million to build, financed by private investors.

In June 2026 it was announced that Trafalgar Entertainment had acquired the Bridge Theatre and London Theatre Company along with sister venue Lightroom.

== Format ==
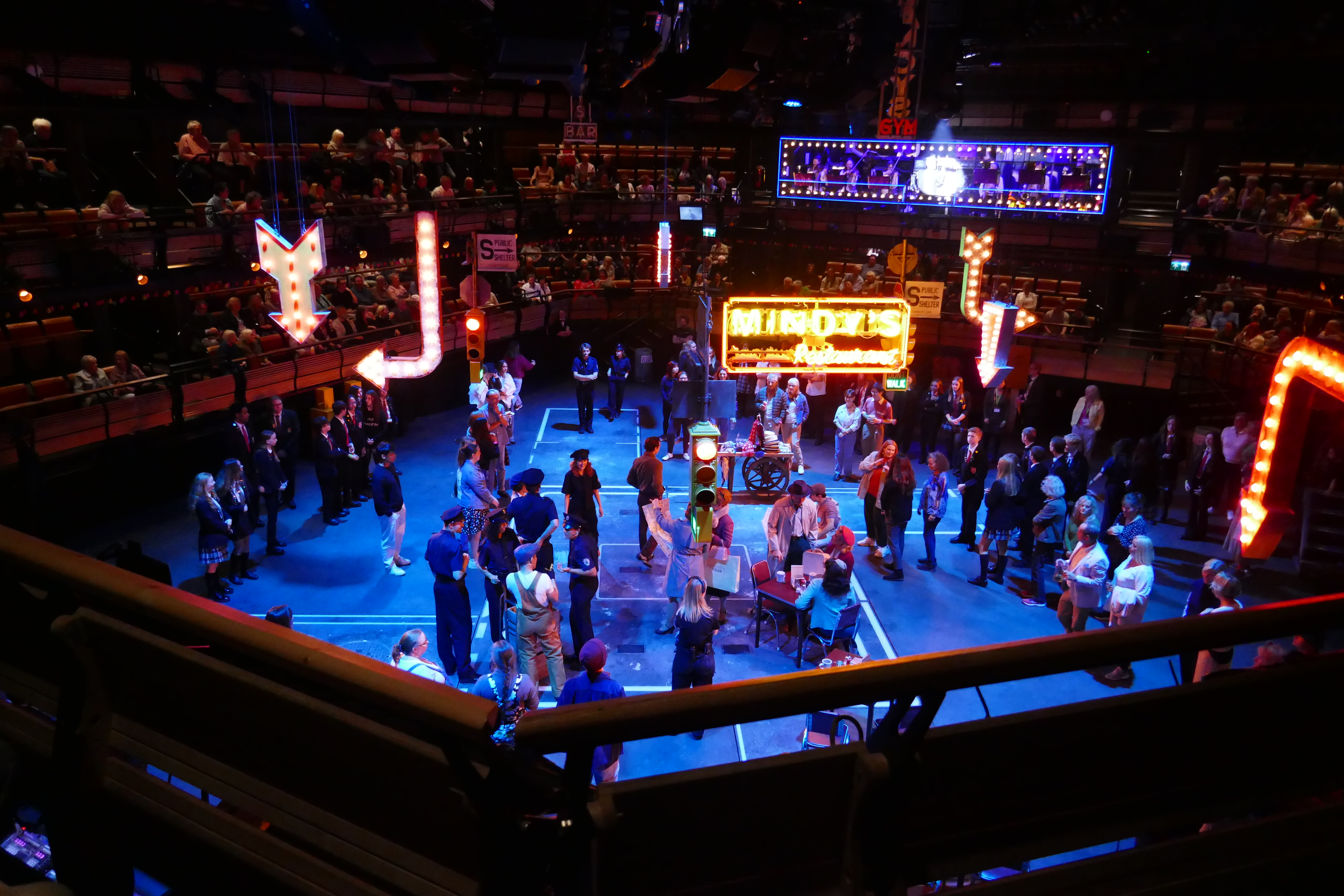
Performance of Guys and Dolls in 2024

The theatre seats 900 but is a flexible space designed to adapt to accommodate each production with a maximum capacity of 1,100 in its promenade format.

For example, the opening production, Young Marx, featured a traditional proscenium arrangement. The productions of Julius Caesar (2018), A Midsummer Night's Dream (2019, 2025) and Guys and Dolls (2023-25) had the stalls seating removed with the audience standing around moving and raising platforms offering an in-the-round immersive experience in promenade. Nightfall (2018) was performed on a thrust stage.

== Production history ==
Produced by London Theatre Company

- Young Marx by Richard Bean and Clive Coleman, starring Rory Kinnear and Oliver Chris, directed by Nicholas Hytner (18 October – 31 December 2017)
- Julius Caesar by William Shakespeare, starring Michelle Fairley, Ben Whishaw, David Calder and David Morrissey, directed by Nicholas Hytner (20 January – 15 April 2018)
- Nightfall by Barney Norris, starring Ophelia Lovibond, Ukweli Roach, Claire Skinner and Sion Daniel Young, directed by Laurie Sansom (28 April – 3 June 2018)
- My Name is Lucy Barton by Elizabeth Strout, adapted by Rona Munro, starring Laura Linney, directed by Richard Eyre (2–23 June 2018)
- Allelujah! by Alan Bennett, directed by Nicholas Hytner (11 July – 28 September 2018)
- A Very Very Very Dark Matter by Martin McDonagh, starring Jim Broadbent, directed by Matthew Dunster (10 October – 29 December 2018)
- My Name is Lucy Barton by Elizabeth Strout, adapted by Rona Munro, starring Laura Linney, directed by Richard Eyre (23 January – 16 February 2019, revival of 2018 production)
- Alys, Always a new play by Lucinda Coxon based on the novel by Harriet Lane, starring Joanne Froggatt and Robert Glenister, directed by Nicholas Hytner (25 February – 30 March 2019)
- A German Life – a new play by Christopher Hampton, drawn from the life and testimony of Brunhilde Pomsel, starring Maggie Smith, directed by Jonathan Kent (6 April – 11 May 2019)
- A Midsummer Night's Dream by William Shakespeare, directed by Nicholas Hytner (3 June – 31 August 2019)
- Two Ladies – a new play by Nancy Harris, starring Zoë Wanamaker and Zrinka Cvitešić, directed by Nicholas Hytner (14 September – 26 October 2019)
- The Lion, the Witch and the Wardrobe, based on the Leeds Playhouse production, directed by Sally Cookson, devised by the company (9 November 2019 – 2 February 2020)
- A Number – by Caryl Churchill, starring Roger Allam and Colin Morgan, directed by Polly Findlay (14 February – 14 March 2020)
- Beat the Devil – by David Hare, starring Ralph Fiennes, directed by Nicholas Hytner (27 August – 7 November 2020)
- Talking Heads – by Alan Bennett (monologues performed by Monica Dolan, Lesley Manville, Rochenda Sandall, Kristin Scott Thomas, Tamsin Greig, Maxine Peake, Lucian Msamati and Imelda Staunton) (28 September – 31 October 2020)
- A Christmas Carol – by Charles Dickens, starring Simon Russell Beale, Patsy Ferran and Eben Figueiredo, adapted and directed by Nicholas Hytner (27 November 2020 – 16 January 2021, closed early due to the COVID-19 pandemic)
- Bach and Sons – a new play by Nina Raine, starring Simon Russell Beale, directed by Nicholas Hytner (23 June – 11 September 2021)
- White Noise – by Suzan-Lori Parks, directed by Polly Findlay (5 October – 13 November 2021)
- The Book of Dust: La Belle Sauvage – by Philip Pullman, adapted by Bryony Lavery, directed by Nicholas Hytner (2 December 2021 – 26 February 2022)
- Straight Line Crazy – a new play by David Hare, starring Ralph Fiennes, directed by Nicholas Hytner (14 March – 18 June 2022)
- The Southbury Child – a new play by Stephen Beresford, starring Alex Jennings, directed by Nicholas Hytner (1 July – 27 August 2022)
- John Gabriel Borkman – by Henrik Ibsen, a new version by Lucinda Coxon, starring Simon Russell Beale, directed by Nicholas Hytner (24 September – 26 November 2022)
- A Christmas Carol – by Charles Dickens, starring Simon Russell Beale, Lyndsey Marshal and Eben Figueiredo, adapted and directed by Nicholas Hytner (6–31 December 2022, revival of 2020 production)
- Guys and Dolls – music and lyrics by Frank Loesser and book by Jo Swerling and Abe Burrows based on the story and characters by Damon Runyon, starring Daniel Mays, Marisha Wallace, Celinde Schoenmaker, Andrew Richardson, Cedric Neal, Owain Arthur and Gina Beck, directed by Nicholas Hytner (27 February 2023 – 4 January 2025)
- Richard II – by William Shakespeare, starring Jonathan Bailey, directed by Nicholas Hytner (10 February – 10 May 2025)
- A Midsummer Night's Dream – by William Shakespeare, directed by Nicholas Hytner (31 May – 23 August 2025, revival of 2019 production)
- The Lady from the Sea – by Henrik Ibsen, a new version written and directed by Simon Stone (10 September – 8 November 2025), starring Alicia Vikander and Andrew Lincoln
- Into the Woods – music and lyrics by Stephen Sondheim and book by James Lapine, directed by Jordan Fein (2 December 2025 – 30 May 2026)
- The Oresteia – written and directed by Simon Stone after Aeschylus and others (2 July – 19 September 2026)

Upcoming productions

- Pride – music by Christopher Nightingale, Josh Cohen and DJ Walde, book and lyrics by Stephen Beresford, developed and directed by Matthew Warchus (12 November 2026 – 8 May 2027)
