= Nicholas Hytner =

English theatre and film director

Sir Nicholas Hytner
- Born: 7 May 1956 (age 70); Didsbury, England
- Education: Trinity Hall, Cambridge (BA)
- Occupations: Director, film producer
- Relatives: Benet Hytner (father); Joyce Hytner (mother)
- Awards: Full list

Sir Nicholas Robert Hytner (/ˈhaɪtnər/ HITE-nər; born 7 May 1956) is an English theatre and film director, and film producer. He was the artistic director at the Royal National Theatre from 2003 to 2015. His major successes as director include Miss Saigon, The History Boys and One Man, Two Guvnors. He is also known for directing films such as The Madness of King George (1994), The Crucible (1996), The History Boys (2006), and The Lady in the Van (2015). Hytner was knighted in the 2010 New Year Honours for services to drama by Queen Elizabeth II.

== Early life and education ==
Hytner was born in the prosperous suburbs of south Manchester in 1956, to barrister Benet Hytner and his wife, Joyce. He is the eldest child of four, and has described his upbringing as being in "a typical Jewish, cultured family".

He attended Manchester Grammar School and went to university at Trinity Hall, Cambridge, where he studied English. He did some acting while at university, including co-scripting and performing in a televised production of the 1977 Cambridge Footlights Revue. However, Hytner did not consider acting his strong point. "I think I was savvy enough when I went to Cambridge to discover I was a poor actor," he said later. He also did some directing, including a production of Bertolt Brecht and Kurt Weill's Rise and Fall of the City of Mahagonny.

== Career ==
=== Early career ===
After leaving Cambridge, Hytner's first "proper paid job" was as assistant to Colin Graham at English National Opera. Some of his earliest professional directing work was in opera, including at Kent Opera, Wexford Festival Opera and a production of Rienzi at English National Opera. His first theatre productions were at the Northcott Theatre, Exeter. He then directed a series of productions at the Leeds Playhouse, including The Ruling Class by Peter Barnes, an adaptation of Tom Jones and a musical version of Alice in Wonderland. In 1985 he became an Associate Director of the Royal Exchange Theatre, Manchester, a position he retained until 1989.

=== Theatre director ===
Hytner was hired by producer Cameron Mackintosh to direct Miss Saigon, the next work from Les Misérables creators Alain Boublil and Claude-Michel Schönberg. "I had seen several of Nick's opera productions – Handel's 'Xerxes' and Mozart's 'Magic Flute' – as well as some of his classical plays, and he has a marvellously visual point of view," Mackintosh said. For Hytner, "It just felt like a huge lark... It was gigantic, and I was into gigantic at the time, so I threw everything I knew at it. It was big, honest, moving, brash, kind of crazy. I had no idea that it would take off."

Hytner's London production of Miss Saigon opened on 20 September 1989, and closed on 30 October 1999 after just over ten years, on its 4,274th performance, having grossed more than £150 million in ticket sales during its London run. Hytner also directed the New York production, where the show recouped its $10.9m investment in 39 weeks. The show, at New York's Broadway Theatre, opened on 11 April 1991 and closed on 28 January 2001 after 4,092 performances.

Hytner was on a percentage for both London and New York productions, allowing him (then aged 34) to never need worry about money again. "It was a huge– a massive stroke of fortune," he said in 2010. "It meant that thereafter I only needed to do what I wanted to do."

What Hytner did was to continue directing theatre and opera, including several productions at London's National Theatre (where he had first directed in 1989 with Ghetto). In 1990, he was appointed an Associate Director of the National by its then-Director Richard Eyre. One of the plays he directed was Alan Bennett's The Madness of George III. When a film adaptation was commissioned, Bennett insisted Hytner should direct it, and the retitled The Madness of King George (1994) became Hytner's film debut.

In 1994, Eyre announced he would be leaving the National Theatre in three years' time. "[It] made me begin to think about the vision that is needed in such a position and the fact that this needs refreshing under every directorate. I very much felt that you had to have a big idea in order to put yourself forward for such a role and as I didn't have this kind of idea at that time, I decided not to apply," Hytner said later. He continued as an Associate Director at the National until 1997, when the new Director, Trevor Nunn, took up his post.

Hytner directed more films: The Crucible (1996) with Daniel Day-Lewis, The Object of My Affection (1998) and Center Stage (2000). The last of these was not an adaptation from a play or novel, having been based on an original screenplay. He also spent 15 months developing a film of the musical Chicago, to star Madonna, but the project foundered and was later made with a different director and cast.

=== National Theatre Director (2003–15) ===
When Trevor Nunn announced that he would be leaving the National Theatre, Hytner "really felt that this time I had a strong sense of what the NT should be doing under a new Director. I had a long conversation with Christopher Hogg, then Chairman of the NT Board, and Tom Stoppard about my ideas for the NT's future. These included a redefinition of how it might be possible to use the theatre spaces and opening up the NT to new audiences by lowering prices for some performances." Hytner was successful in his application for the post, and his appointment as Director was announced in September 2001. He took over from Nunn in April 2003.

Hytner's role as Director of the National involved decisions about what plays are staged. "Essentially what I do is produce 20 shows a year here," he stated in one interview. "To produce as opposed to direct, as I generate the ideas, generate the repertoire. What I do is put together the team that are going to stage the repertoire together then stand back and come in at a later stage to see how it's all going." (Hytner also directed plays himself at the National, and all his theatre work during his period as Director originated there.) But his role was also about the overall direction of the National Theatre as an organisation. "It would be wrong to say that I confine myself only to the repertoire – I don't. I think how we allocate our resources, exactly what we spend money on, is always an artistic decision. I think the amount of attention we give to what goes on in the foyers, what goes on outside, how the building looks at night, the amount of attention we give to our education work and our website are all artistic matters. They all stem from a sense of the artistic direction of the organization."

Under Hytner's directorship, the National innovated with Sunday openings, live cinema broadcasts of NT plays around the world, National Theatre Live, and with its reduced price ticket seasons. These seasons, sponsored by Travelex, offered large numbers of reduced price seats (for £10 when the scheme was introduced in 2003, with prices rising to £12 from 2011). The reduced price seasons were credited with achieving high usage for the Olivier auditorium – between 90% and 100% full during the summer months compared to a historic average of 65%, with no loss in overall income, and with encouraging a younger and more diverse audience. In 2003 it was reported that one third of the audience for the multiracial production of Henry V in modern dress (directed by Hytner) had never been to the theatre before, and that a large section of the audience for the drama Elmina's Kitchen were Black east Londoners new to the National.

Hytner has said that this diversity was a consequence of the theatre's direction rather than the motivation for it. "I think our repertoire is more diverse than it's ever been," he said, "and I think that reflects a more diverse society and a more diverse audience. The aim, though, was not to go out and find a diverse audience but for the repertoire to reflect a greater diversity in our culture." He also said: "The rep[ertoire] should reflect the world we're part of, and it should put the society in which we live in the context of the past and, as far as we can, of the wider world."

Another of Hytner's innovations was NT Future, a £70 million scheme (of which £59 million had been raised at October 2012) to open up the National's building and to contribute to the regeneration of the South Bank, to transform facilities for education and participation, and to keep ahead of new technologies and the changing needs of theatre artists and audiences.

Hytner stated as early as 2010 that he did not wish to stay as head of the National indefinitely, saying, "I've been here seven years. My predecessors have averaged 12. It's important that someone else comes in and shakes it up again so I won't be here in 10 years, that's for sure." In April 2013, he announced that he would step down as Director of the National Theatre at the end of March 2015. In his role as Director of National Theatre, he appeared on the Cultural Exchange as part of the Radio Four programme Front Row, where he chose The Marriage of Figaro by Mozart as his work of art.

=== The London Theatre Company (2017–present) ===
Hytner and Nick Starr founded the London Theatre Company opening a new 900-seat adaptable commercial theatre, Bridge Theatre near Tower Bridge in October 2017. Hytner directed the inaugural production of Young Marx followed by productions such as the hit immersive revivals of William Shakespeare's Julius Caesar in 2018, A Midsummer Night's Dream in 2019 and Guys and Dolls which ran from March 2023 until January 2025.

The London Theatre Company also opened another venue with 59 Productions, The Lightroom in King's Cross, London in February 2023 used for immersive artist-led exhibitions which will also eventually become a theatrical space.

=== Opera and film ===
Hytner has worked extensively in opera, with many of his productions achieving critical acclaim and commercial success – his English National Opera staging of The Magic Flute was in repertory for 25 years. But Hytner has described himself (to an opera-related audience) as "someone who is unimpressed by his own work on the operatic stage".

Similarly, most of Hytner's films have achieved critical and commercial success, with The Madness of King George winning BAFTA and Evening Standard awards for best British film, but he still sees himself as primarily a theatre practitioner. "I think I'm a theatre director who does other stuff," he has said. "I can't see myself as a film-maker. I love doing opera when ever I've done it, but I always see myself as visiting from the theatre, which is where I belong. The real film-maker thinks with a camera, which is something I just can't do."

== Personal life ==
Hytner is gay. Although brought up in a Jewish household, Hytner said in 2010, "I'm not a believer, but I do think it is a significant part of my adventure and it fascinates me. I couldn't say I'm a member of the Jewish community or gay community in that I don't seek out either of those communities to hang out with, but it is an important part of who I believe myself to [be]."

Hytner's mother, Joyce Hytner OBE, is a theatrical fundraiser, who has served on the board of many organisations including The Old Vic, the Criterion Theatre, the Royal Court Theatre and Historic Royal Palaces.

== Works ==
=== Film ===
Year	Title	Director	Producer
1994	The Madness of King George	Yes	No
1996	The Crucible	Yes	No
1998	The Object of My Affection	Yes	No
2000	Center Stage	Yes	No
2006	The History Boys	Yes	Yes
2015	The Lady in the Van	Yes	Yes
2025	The Choral	Yes	Yes

=== Television ===
Year	Title	Notes
2013	National Theatre Live: 50 Years On Stage	TV special
2020	Talking Heads	3 episodes

=== Theatre ===
Year	Title	Playwright	Theater	Ref.
1982	Absurd Person Singular	Alan Ayckbourn	Northcott Theatre, Exeter	
1984	Jumpers	Tom Stoppard	Royal Exchange, Manchester	
1985	The Scarlet Pimpernel	Baroness Orczy	Chichester Festival Theatre	
1986	As You Like It	William Shakespeare	Royal Exchange, Manchester	
1986	Mumbo Jumbo	Robin Glendinning	Royal Exchange, Manchester	
1986	Edward II	Christopher Marlowe	Royal Exchange, Manchester	
1987	The Country Wife	William Wycherley	Royal Exchange, Manchester	
1987	Don Carlos	Friedrich Schiller	Royal Exchange, Manchester	
1988	The Tempest	William Shakespeare	Royal Exchange, Manchester	
1988	Measure for Measure	William Shakespeare	Barbican Theatre	
1989	Ghetto	Joshua Sobol	National Theatre	
1990	Volpone	Ben Jonson	Almeida Theatre	
1990–91	The Wind in the Willows	Kenneth Grahame adapted by Alan Bennett	National Theatre	
1989–99; 1991–2001	Miss Saigon	Claude-Michel Schönberg	Drury Lane, West End; The Broadway Theatre, Broadway	
1991	King Lear	William Shakespeare	Barbican Theatre	
1991–92	The Madness of George III	Alan Bennett	National Theatre	
1992	The Recruiting Officer	George Farquhar	National Theatre	
1992; 1994–95	Carousel	Rodgers and Hammerstein	Lyttleton Theatre, National Theatre; Vivian Beaumont Theater; Lincoln Center, New York	
1993	The Importance of Being Earnest	Oscar Wilde	Aldwych Theatre	
1997	The Cripple of Inishmaan	Martin McDonagh	National Theatre	
1998	Twelfth Night	William Shakespeare	Vivian Beaumont Theater, Broadway; Lincoln Center, New York	
1999	The Lady in the Van	Alan Bennett	Queen's Theatre	
2000	Orpheus Descending	Tennessee Williams	Donmar Warehouse	
2000	Cressida	Nicholas Wright	Albery Theatre	
2001	The Winter's Tale	William Shakespeare	National Theatre	
2001	Mother Clap's Molly House	Mark Ravenhill	National Theatre	
2002	Sweet Smell of Success	Marvin Hamlisch / Craig Carnelia	Martin Beck Theatre, Broadway	
2003	Henry V	William Shakespeare	National Theatre	
2003	His Dark Materials	Philip Pullman	Olivier Theatre, National Theatre	
2005; 2006	The History Boys	Alan Bennett	Lyttelton Theatre, National Theatre; Broadhurst Theatre, Broadway	
2004	Stuff Happens	David Hare	National Theatre	
2005	Henry IV, Part 1	William Shakespeare	National Theatre	
2005	Henry IV, Part 2	William Shakespeare	National Theatre	
2006	Southwark Fair	Samuel Adamson	National Theatre	
2006	The Alchemist	Ben Jonson	National Theatre	
2007	The Man of Mode	George Etherege	National Theatre	
2007	Rafta, Rafta...	Ayub Khan-Din	National Theatre	
2007–08	Much Ado About Nothing	William Shakespeare	National Theatre	
2008	Major Barbara	George Bernard Shaw	National Theatre	
2009	England People Very Nice	Richard Bean	National Theatre	
2009	Phèdre	Jean Racine	National Theatre	
2010	The Habit of Art	Alan Bennett	National Theatre	
2010	London Assurance	Dion Boucicault	National Theatre	
2010–11	Hamlet	William Shakespeare	Olivier Theatre, National Theatre	
2011; 2011–15; 2012	One Man, Two Guvnors	Richard Bean	Lyttleton Theatre, National Theatre; Adelphi Theatre, West End; Music Box Theatre, Broadway	
2011–12	Collaborators	John Hodge	Cottesloe Theatre, National Theatre	
2012	Travelling Light	Nicholas Wright	National Theatre	
2012	Timon of Athens	William Shakespeare	Olivier Theatre, National Theatre	
2013	Othello	William Shakespeare	Olivier Theatre, National Theatre	
2014	Great Britain	Richard Bean	Lyttleton Theatre; Haymarket Theatre	
2015	The Hard Problem	Tom Stoppard	Dorfman, National Theatre	
2017	Young Marx	Richard Bean and Clive Coleman	Bridge Theatre	
2018	Julius Caesar	William Shakespeare	Bridge Theatre	
2018	Allelujah!	Alan Bennett	Bridge Theatre	
2019	Alys, Always	Lucinda Coxon	Bridge Theatre	
2019	A Midsummer Night's Dream	William Shakespeare	Bridge Theatre	
2019	Two Ladies	Nancy Harris	Bridge Theatre	
2020	Beat the Devil	David Hare	Bridge Theatre	
2020	Talking Heads	Alan Bennett	Bridge Theatre	
2020, 2022	A Christmas Carol	Charles Dickens adapted by Hytner	Bridge Theatre	
2021	Bach & Sons	Nina Raine	Bridge Theatre	
2021	The Book of Dust: La Belle Sauvage	Philip Pullman	Bridge Theatre	
2022	Straight Line Crazy	David Hare	Bridge Theatre, London; The Shed, Off-Broadway	
2022	The Southbury Child	Stephen Beresford	Chichester Festival Theatre; Bridge Theatre	
2022	John Gabriel Borkman	Henrik Ibsen	Bridge Theatre	
2023–25	Guys and Dolls	Frank Loesser, Jo Swerling and Abe Burrows	Bridge Theatre	
2024; 2025; 2026	Giant	Mark Rosenblatt	Royal Court Theatre; Harold Pinter Theatre; Music Box Theatre, Broadway	
2025	Richard II	William Shakespeare	Bridge Theatre	
2026	The Standard of Living	James Graham	Theatre Royal Haymarket	

=== Opera ===
Opera produced by Nicholas Hytner
House	Opera	Composer	First production	Notes
Kent Opera	The Turn of the Screw	Benjamin Britten	1979	
Kent Opera	The Marriage of Figaro	Mozart	1981	
Wexford Festival Opera	Sakùntala	Franco Alfano	1982	
Kent Opera	King Priam	Michael Tippett	1983	
English National Opera	Rienzi	Wagner	1983	
English National Opera	Xerxes	Handel	1985	
Paris Opéra	Giulio Cesare	Handel	1987	
Royal Opera	Kuningas lähtee Ranskaan (The King Goes Forth To France)	Aulis Sallinen	1987	
Royal Opera	The Knot Garden	Michael Tippett	1988	
English National Opera	The Magic Flute	Mozart	1988	
Grand Théâtre de Genève	Le Nozze di Figaro	Mozart	1989	
Glyndebourne	La clemenza di Tito	Mozart	1991	
English National Opera	The Force of Destiny	Verdi	1992	
Bavarian State Opera, Munich	Don Giovanni	Mozart	1994	
Théâtre du Châtelet, Paris	The Cunning Little Vixen	Janáček	1995	
English National Opera	Xerxes	Handel	2002	
Glyndebourne	Così fan tutte	Mozart	2006	
Royal Opera	Don Carlo	Verdi	2008	
Metropolitan Opera	Don Carlo	Verdi	2010	

== Awards and honours ==
Hytner is on the Board of Trustees of the Royal Opera House and Royal Shakespeare Company. He is a patron of many organisations including London International Festival of Theatre, HighTide Festival Theatre, the Shakespeare Schools Festival, Dance UK, Action for Children's Arts, Pan Intercultural Arts and Prisoners' Penfriends.

He was elected an Honorary Fellow of Trinity Hall, Cambridge, in 2005, and was Visiting Professor of Contemporary Theatre at Oxford University in 2000–01.

Hytner was knighted in the 2010 New Year Honours for services to drama. In spring 2014, the Royal Northern College of Music announced it was to confer Honorary Membership of the College upon Hytner. In 2014 he was awarded an Honorary Fellowship of the Royal Academy of Arts.

Year	Category	Nominated work	Result	Ref.
1995	British Academy Film Awards	Outstanding British Film	The Madness of King George	Won
1995	British Academy Film Awards	Best Film	The Madness of King George	Nominated
1995	British Academy Film Awards	Best Direction	The Madness of King George	Nominated
1991	Tony Awards	Best Direction of a Musical	Miss Saigon	Nominated
1994	Tony Awards	Best Direction of a Musical	Carousel	Won
2006	Tony Awards	Best Direction of a Play	The History Boys	Won
2012	Tony Awards	Best Direction of a Play	One Man, Two Guvnors	Nominated
2026	Tony Awards	Best Direction of a Play	Giant	Nominated
1990	Laurence Olivier Awards	Best Director	Miss Saigon	Nominated
1991	Laurence Olivier Awards	Best Director of a Play	The Wind in the Willows	Nominated
1993	Laurence Olivier Awards	Best Director of a Musical	Carousel	Won
2001	Laurence Olivier Awards	Best Director	Orpheus Descending	Nominated
2005	Laurence Olivier Awards	Best Director	The History Boys	Won
2012	Laurence Olivier Awards	Best Director	One Man, Two Guvnors	Nominated
2014	Laurence Olivier Awards	Society of London Theatre Special Award		Won
2025	Laurence Olivier Awards	Best Director	Giant	Nominated

Accolades received by Hytner's feature films
Year	Title	Academy Awards		BAFTA		Golden Globes	
Year	Title	Nominations	Wins	Nominations	Wins	Nominations	Wins
1994	The Madness of King George	4	1	14	3		
1996	The Crucible	2		2	1	2	
2006	The History Boys			2			
2015	The Lady in the Van			1		1	
Total		6	1	19	4	3	

== See also ==
- List of British film directors
- List of English speaking theatre directors in the 20th and 21st centuries
