= Claire Rafferty (actress) =

Northern Irish actress

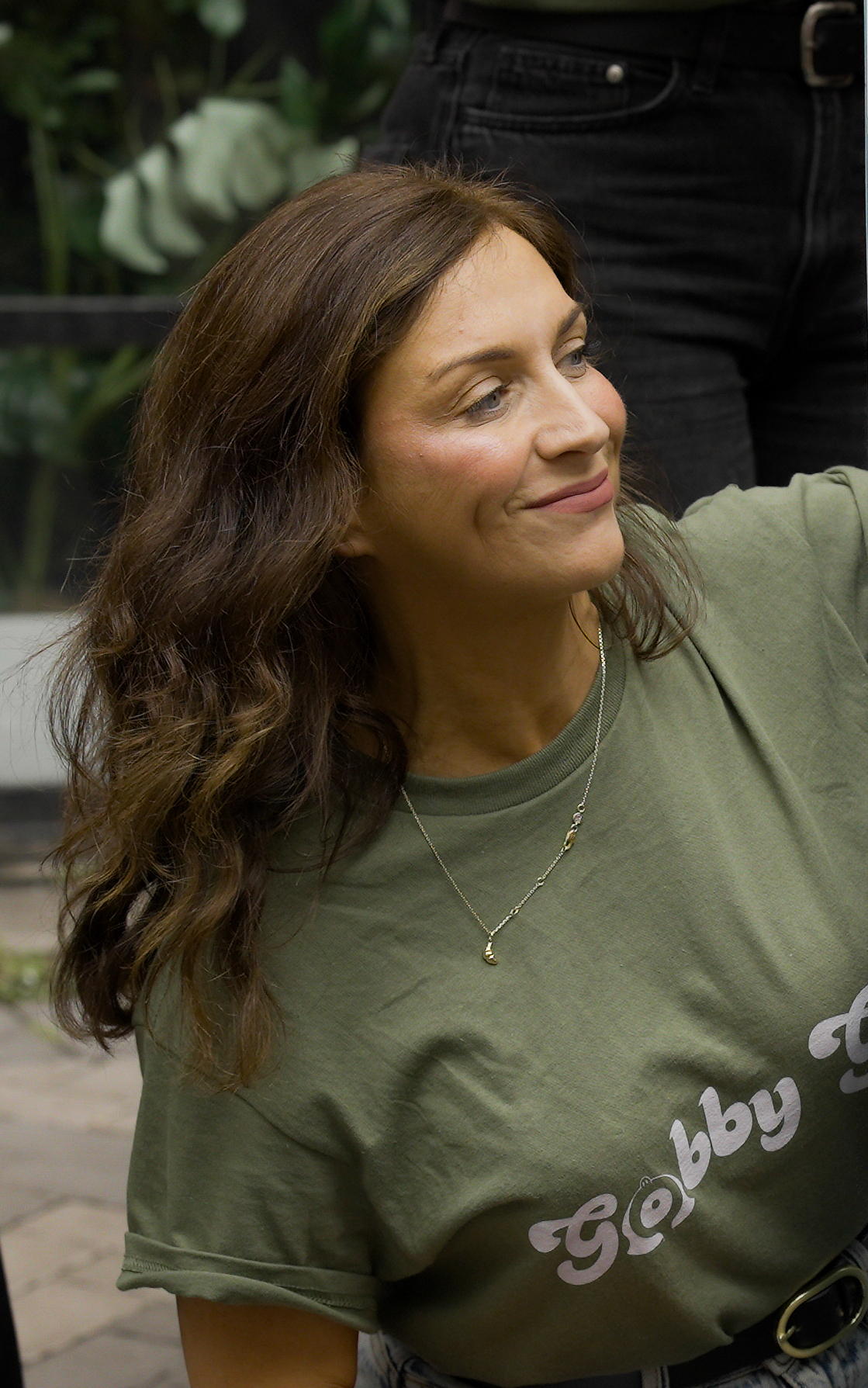
- Born: Belfast, Northern Ireland
- Education: Queen's University Belfast; London Academy of Music and Dramatic Art
- Occupation: Actress
- Years active: 2003–present

Claire Rafferty is a Northern Irish actress. She studied drama at Queen's University Belfast (2000 – 2003) followed by London Academy of Music and Dramatic Art. On television, she played Anna Haldane in the first series of Shetland, Detective Constable Christine Larkin in The Fall series 2 and 3, Tabitha Richie (lead role) in Banged Up Abroad: Bogota Belly Bust, and deputy headmistress Miss Mooney in all series of Derry Girls.

== Filmography ==
Film
Year	Title	Role	Director
2014	The Woman in Black: Angel of Death	Clara	Tom Harper
2016	Banshee Betty		Sam Brown
2017	Beast	News Reporter	Michael Pearce
2018	Here's Looking at You Kid	Miss Abbott	Michael Lennox
2020	Heaven Come In	Cara	Rebekah Davis
2023	The Last Rifleman	Vicky Tedjury	Terry Loane

Television
Date	Title	Role	Director	Notes
2012	The Bletchley Circle	Emily Dixon	Andy de Emmony	Episode: "Cracking a Killer's Code, Part 1"
2013	Shetland	Anna Haldane	Peter Hoar	Episode: "Red Bones" (2 parts)
2013	Misfits	Hayley	Lewis Arnold	Episode 5.6
2014–2016	The Fall	DC Christine Larkin	Allan Cubitt	9 episodes
2015	Fortitude	Anna	Sam Miller	
2015	Doctors	Ruth Anderton	Owen Brenman	Episode: "A Very Reverend Institution"
2015	Cuffs	Fiona Glendon	Kieron Hawkes	Episode 4
2015–2017	The Frankenstein Chronicles	Mrs Flynn	Benjamin Ross; Alex Gabassi	Episodes: "Seeing Things"; "All the Lost Children"; "Not John Marlott"; "Seeing the Dead"
2016	Vera	Ellie Connock	Paul Gay	Episode: "The Sea Glass"
2016	Houdini and Doyle	Charlotte	Daniel O'Hara	Episode: "In Manus Dei"
2016	Banged Up Abroad	Tabitha Richie	Sam Brown	Episode: "Bogota Belly Bust"
2017	Silent Witness	Sarah Logan	David Richards	Episode: "Remembrance"
2018–2022	Derry Girls	Miss Mooney	Michael Lennox	8 episodes
2019	Casualty	Maggie McKiernan	Daikin Marsh	Episode 34
2019	The Feed	Claire Leabridge	Jill Robertson	Episode 6
2021	Three Families	DC Fallon	Alex Kalymnios	2 episodes

Theatre
Date	Title	Author	Role	Director	Company / Theatre
2003	Redundant	Leo Butler	Lucy	Tanya Nash	Tinderbox
–	Living With Cancer		Kelly	Alison McCrudden	Cancer Lifeline
2007	Romeo and Juliet	William Shakespeare	Juliet	John Link	LAMDA; Linbury
2007	Uncle Vanya	Anton Chekhov	Yelena	Colin Cook	LAMDA; Linbury
2007	Pericles	William Shakespeare & George Wilkins	Gower	Rodney Cottier	LAMDA; Linbury
2007	Caucasian Chalk Circle	Bertolt Brecht	Mother In Law	John Baxter	LAMDA; Linbury
2008	The Cherry Orchard	Anton Chekhov	Ranyevskaya	Jo Blatchley	LAMDA; Linbury
2008	Mixed Up North	Robin Soans	Jen	Max Stafford-Clark	LAMDA; Linbury
2009	Mixed Up North	Robin Soans	Maureen & Catherine	Max Stafford-Clark	Out of Joint & Octagon Theatre, Bolton Tour: 20099 / Octagon Theatre, Bolton; 2009 / Royal Theatre, Northampton; 2009 / Curve, Leicester; 2009 / Nuffield Theatre, Southampton; 2009 / Stonyhurst College, Clitheroe; 2009 / Bolton Lads and Girls Club; 2009 / Bolton Sixth Form College; 2009 / Turton School, Bolton; 2009 / The ACE Centre, Nelson; 2009 / The Dukes, Lancaster; 2009 / Everyman Theatre, Liverpool; 2009 / Wilton's Music Hall, London
2010	Dancing at Lughnasa	Brian Friel	Christina Mundy	Tamara Harvey	Birmingham Repertory
2010–2011	The Big Fellah	Richard Bean	Elizabeth	Max Stafford-Clark	Out of Joint Tour: 2010 / Corn Exchange, Newbury; 2010 / Royal & Derngate, Northampton; 2010 / Theatre Royal, Bury St Edmunds; 2010 / Lyric Hammersmith, London; 2010 / Oxford Playhouse; 2010 / Nuffield Theatre, Southampton; 2010 / York Theatre Royal; 2010 / Birmingham Repertory Theatre; 2011 / Gaiety Theatre, Dublin; 2011 / Everyman Palace Theatre, Cork; 2011 / Liverpool Playhouse; 2011 / Northern Stage, Newcastle upon Tyne
2012	Macbeth	William Shakespeare	Third Witch & Lady Macduff	Lynne Parker	Lyric Theatre, Belfast
2014	Three Loose Teeth	Thomas McMullan	Various	Andrew Pritchard	BacksBroke; Shakespeare in Shoreditch Festival
