= Documentary theatre =

Theatre based on presenting factual material

Documentary theatre is theatre that uses pre-existing documentary material (such as newspapers, government reports, interviews, journals, and correspondences) as source material for stories about real events and people, frequently without altering the text in performance. The genre typically includes or is referred to as verbatim theatre, investigative theatre, theatre of fact, theatre of witness, autobiographical theatre, and ethnodrama.

== History ==
=== Zhivaya gazeta and Piscator ===
While fact-based drama has been traced back to ancient Greece and Phrynichus' production of The Capture of Miletus in 492 BC, contemporary documentary theatre is rooted in theatrical practices developed in Eastern Europe during the 1920s and 1930s. In the years after the Russian Revolution, the USSR's Department of Agitation and Propaganda employed theatre troupes known as the Blue Blouses (so called because they wore factory workers' overalls) to stage current events for the largely illiterate population. The Blue Blouses dramatized news items and current events through song, dance, and staging. By 1924 these performances were standardized into the form of the zhivaya gazeta (живая газета), or living newspaper.

Meanwhile, in Germany, Erwin Piscator was experimenting with incorporating documentary film footage and other primary source material into his "mass spectacles". In 1925 he wrote In Spite of Everything, a piece derived entirely from contemporary political documents and often cited as the beginning of the first period of modern documentary drama. In this and other early works, Piscator sought to depict the "absolute truth". He focused on the presentation of factual material in montage and collage form rather than trying to express the internal lives of the characters.

=== Depression-era America ===
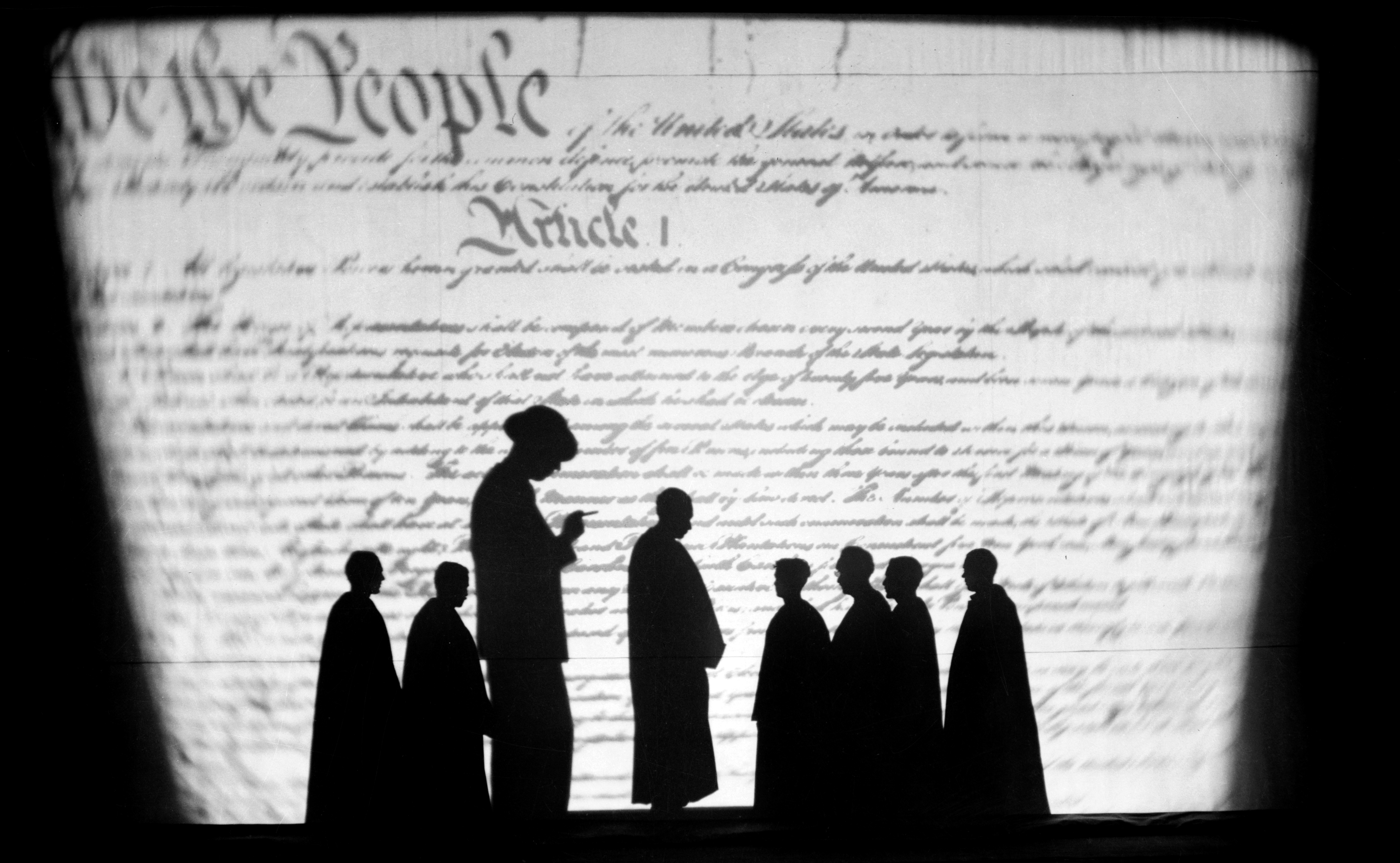
Triple-A Plowed Under (1936), Federal Theater Project

Documentary theatre spread west during the 1930s. In England, the form was employed by left-leaning political theatre groups like the Unity Theatre, which presented both documentary and historical dramas in order to expose the truths of the common man, frequently combining fiction and reality to achieve truth. Unity Theatre's documentary shows focused on the "living newspaper" aesthetic of Eastern Europe. Their first piece, Busmen (1938), combined naturalistic dialogue with abstract and stylized design aesthetics culled from expressionist and constructivist genres.

In the United States, the form was adapted by Hallie Flanagan Davis and Morris Watson into the large-scale Living Newspapers of the Federal Theatre Project of President Franklin D. Roosevelt's administration. Initially conceived as an "animated newsreel", the form evolved into a distinct theatrical genre; practitioners used spectacle and vaudeville techniques in addition to agitprop and Piscatorian conventions to tackle issues such as labor, housing, and agriculture during the Great Depression. Often, they included characters such as Little Man and Loudspeaker to stand in and speak for and to the audience during the action, fusing fact with dramatic symbol and clarifying the narrative arc. These plays, like later iterations of documentary theatre, were frequently communally created, often by groups of newspaper writers and theatre artists. The end of the Federal Theatre Project in 1939 brought documentary theatre in the United States to a halt until the early 1960s.

=== Post-war era and the 1970s ===
While the documentary theatre of the 1930s stressed the involvement of the audience, much of the work of the 1960s into the 1970s was influenced by Bertolt Brecht's distancing of the audience, through aesthetic practices, in order to question dominant ideologies. The work of this era focused more intensely on new or alternative perspectives of historical events by restructuring the documents to raise questions about perceived reality. In Germany, these documentary plays focused mainly on the aftermath of Nazism and the genocide of the Holocaust. Many works drew from transcripts from tribunals, such as Heinar Kipphardt's In the Matter of J. Robert Oppenheimer and Peter Weiss's The Investigation.

In his essay "Notes on the Contemporary Theatre", Weiss details 14 elements of documentary theatre, stating that "the strength of the documentary theatre resides in its ability to arrange fragments of reality into a usable model", and that the artistic power of the genre comes from a partisan interpretation and presentation of factual material. He also identified many potential sources for documentary theatre, including

minutes of proceeding, files, letters, statistical tables, stock-exchange communiques, presentations of balance-sheets of banks and industrial undertakings, official commentaries, speeches, interviews, statements by well-known personalities, press, radio, photo, or film reporting of events and all the other media bearing witness to the present.

This type of documentary drama was exported to Israel and the Middle East by Nola Chilton, whose theatre of testimony focused on marginalized groups in the area and later influenced the work of American practitioners. During this period of time, however, the American genre became more overtly political with plays such as Martin Duberman's In White America, a piece based in Living Newspaper techniques of narration and song, presented by the Free Southern Theatre, a company that sought to make theatre for black audiences in the south. Plays also became more experimental, leading to documentary-style performances, as artists such as Joseph Chaikin and The Open theatre used historical documents as source material for improvisations (Viet Rock) or Luis Valdez combined verbatim text from newspapers, transcripts, and correspondence with a fictionalized story and characters in Zoot Suit.

In England, meanwhile, the use of tape-recorded testimony to generate script became a hallmark of the Stoke Local Documentary Method, developed by Peter Cheeseman. In his many plays, including Fight for Shelton Bar (1977), Hands Up, For You the War Is Ended! (1971), Cheeseman focused on the exact transcription of recorded interviews, and is one of the earliest pioneers of the sub-genre "verbatim theatre". The theories of Cheeseman and other British practitioners of verbatim theatre informed the development much of American documentary theatre of the late 20th-century.

=== Late 20th-century and early 21st-century ===
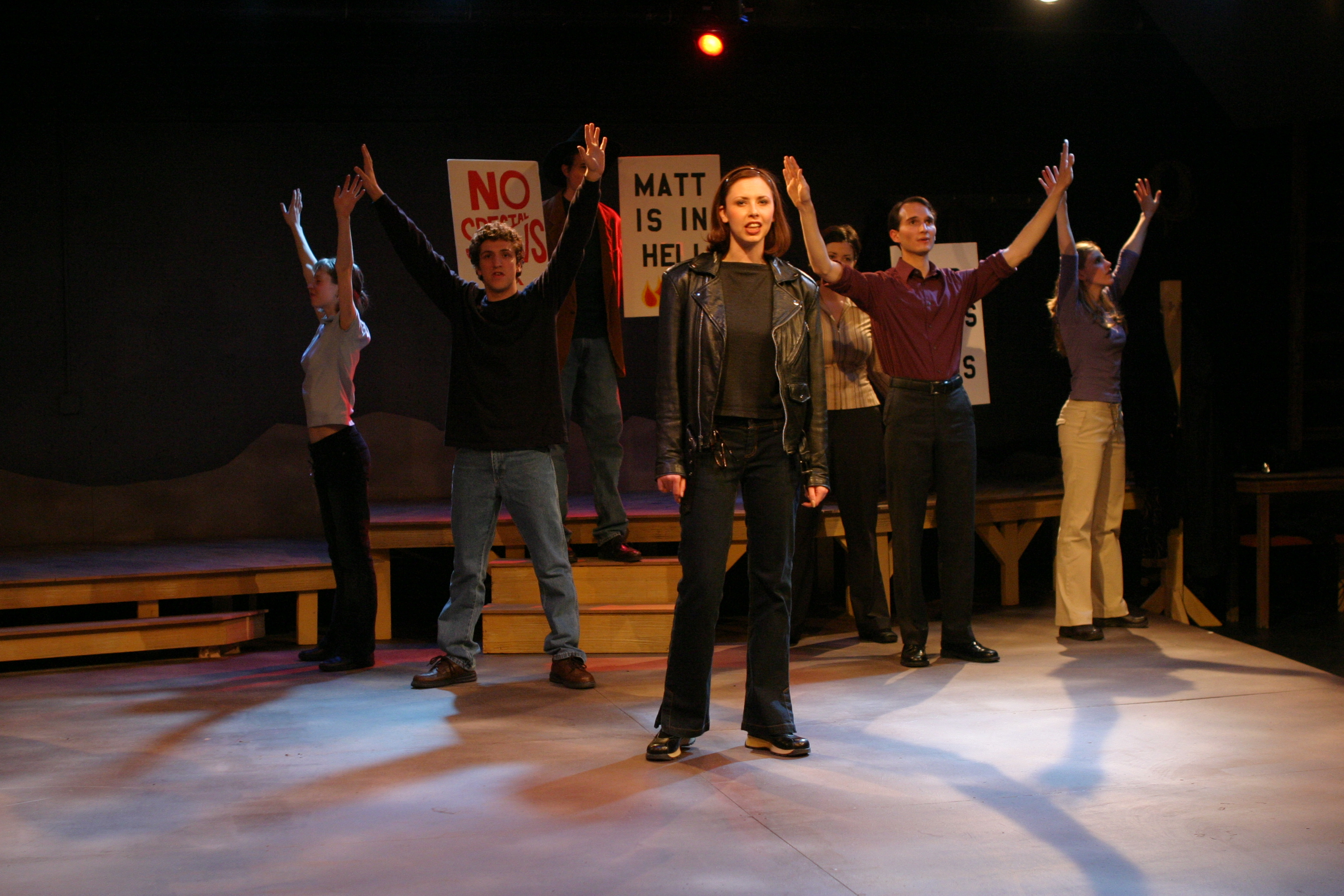
The Laramie Project

The focus on individuals within the context of historical events that permeated the documentary theatre of the 1960s and 1970s paved the way for artist- and individual-centric documentary theatre in the 1980s and 1990s. During this period of time, the focus shifted even further away from broad historical presentations to focus more specifically on how identity shaped personal relationships with major events. The seminal works of this period, which highlight the work of the artist as interpreter of the factual material, include one-person shows such as Anna Deavere Smith's Fires in the Mirror (1992), collectively created shows like Tectonic Theatre Project's The Laramie Project (2000), and playwright-driven work like Anne Nelson's The Guys (2001) and Jessica Blank and Erik Jensen's The Exonerated (2002). In Eastern Europe, new German documentary theatre also focused on the importance of the artist as interpreter through the development of media-driven non-narrative creations of auteur directors like Hans-Werner Kroesinger.

== Contemporary practice ==
Contemporary documentary theatre is defined by its privileging of subjectivity over universality and questioning of the definition of truth in an age where digital and physical realities collide. Many contemporary practitioners reject the term "documentary theatre" in favor of more equivocal labels like "investigative theatre" that allow for more leeway in the artistic interpretation of reality and moves away from the original concept of the artist as moral arbiter of the truth. Just as Piscator utilized the new media of film and projection to enhance his productions, so contemporary documentary theatre continues to rely on new media to explore the increasingly fuzzy line between reality and representation of reality. Similarly, documentary theatre continues to rely on a democratic process of interview gathering and multiple artistic perspectives to create new narratives. This has led to a proliferation of plays, both verbatim and fictionalized, that focus on the stories of refugees and migrants that use interviews and workshops as the starting point for narrative plays. A very recent iteration of documentary theatre has been undertaken by Anuja Ghosalkar and Kai Tuchmann`s Festival "Connecting Realities", which has attempted "to [...] contribute to an examination of Indian and Asian performance practices, both traditional and contemporary, that relate to performing reality."

Contemporary documentary theatre focuses more on the idea that it is difficult to show the complete truth on stage. While earlier forms of documentary theatre tried to present facts in a more objective way, many modern artists understand that becoming overall neutral is not always possible. When directors/creators choose which interviews, quotes, or events to include, they are beginning to create the overall story. Therefore, many productions in today's world have many different perspectives, which helps allow audiences to see different sides of the same issue. Modern documentary theatre also uses different aspects of technology in today's time than it did before. Many creators take inspiration for this type of work from early theatre creators such as ErwinPiscator, who was one of the first creators to use real footage in his theatre showcases. Many performances now include video, audio recordings, and digital media. These elements help connect live performance with real world events and make the experience more engaging and relatable for audiences. Technology also allows productions to gain insight into current topics such as global issues, migration, and the impact of media in society.

Another important change in documentary theatre is the focus on collaboration in order to bring the topics issue to life. Many theatre productions are created by working directly with people who have experienced the events being shown. This can include interviews, workshops, and group storytelling. By including these different voices and experiences, documentary theatre can represent a wider range of perspectives, especially from communities that are often left out or have little to no coverage from the mainstream media. This approach helps make the performances feel more authentic while also bringing attention to real social issues.

== Verbatim theatre ==
Verbatim theatre is a form of documented theatre in which plays are constructed from the precise words spoken by people interviewed about a particular event or topic.

=== Definition ===
The playwright interviews people who are connected to the topic that is the play's focus and then uses their testimony to construct the play. In this way, the playwright seeks to present a multi-voiced approach to events. Such plays may be focused on politics, disasters, sporting, and other social events.

A verbatim (word-for-word) style of theatre uses documented words from interviewees or records, such as court transcripts, to construct the play. Campion Decent, Australian playwright and author of the verbatim theatre play Embers, said it is “not written in a traditional sense… but is... conceived, collected and collated”. It is a creative type of drama to help tell the story of what happened in events. Verbatim theatre exists as conceived in the United Kingdom. But in the United States, verbatim theatre is not always distinguished from the broader genre of documentary theatre. Therefore, the plays, movies and TV listed below – as verbatim theatre, written by playwrights living and writing in the United States, should be considered as documentary theatre.

=== History ===
British-American playwright and critic Eric Bentley's 1974 play Are You Now Or Have You Ever Been: The Investigations of Show-Business by the Un-American Activities Committee was built on testimonies delivered before the US House Un-American Activities Committee in the 1950s.

American actress/playwright Anna Deavere Smith has been described as a pioneer of verbatim theatre due to two of her one-woman plays in the early 1990s: Fires in the Mirror (1992), about the 1991 Crown Heights riot in Brooklyn, New York, and Twilight: Los Angeles, 1992 (1994), about the 1992 Los Angeles riots. For both plays, she conducted interviews with numerous people connected to the events, then fashioned the plays by selecting from her interview transcripts.

New York-based theater company The Civilians, known for its "investigative theater" method, also contributes to the genre with its creative approach that blends in-depth research with theatrical performance. Their work includes landmark productions such as Gone Missing, Mr. Burns, a Post-Electric Play, and The Great Immensity.

High-profile pieces of verbatim theatre include The Laramie Project (2000) by Moises Kaufman and members of the Tectonic Theater Project and its sequel, The Laramie Project: Ten Years Later, both about the murder of Matthew Shepard in Laramie, Wyoming in 1998; Talking to Terrorists by Robin Soans, My Name Is Rachel Corrie by Alan Rickman and Katharine Viner, Deep Cut by Philip Ralph and Katharine Viner, The Permanent Way by David Hare, and Counted (2010) by LookLeftLookRight. Unusually, London Road (2011) by Alecky Blythe and Adam Cork, is a verbatim musical, in which the verbatim spoken text is coupled with music composed and sung to resemble the source interviews as closely as possible. In 2017, the Russian production "In Touch" (director - Ruslan Malikov) premiered its international version at London's National Theater (the Russian premiere was held in Moscow in 2015). It is the first documentary theater production in the world that features an ensemble cast of deafblind actors and seeing/hearing ones performing together - and performing verbatim about their own lives.

More recent examples of political verbatim theatre are Tess Berry-Hart's plays Someone To Blame (2012) and Sochi 2014 (2014). In Someone To Blame (about the miscarriage of justice related to teenager Sam Hallam) the words were taken solely from witness statements, court transcripts, media headlines, and interviews with those involved. Sochi 2014 was created from interviews with various LGBT citizens in Russia after Vladimir Putin's anti-gay laws were passed (see LGBT rights in Russia) in the run-up to the 2014 Winter Olympics. On The Record (2011) by Christine Bacon and Noah Birksted-Breen, produced by iceandfire theatre company at the Arcola Theatre, directed by Michael Longhurst, followed the lives of six real journalists around the globe, showing the professional and personal risks taken in the name of investigative journalism. Building a Real Boy (2017), a New York City play about Aaron Swartz's life, death, and legacy, was "devised" from interviews with Swartz's friends and colleagues, and from Swartz's blog posts and other writings.

Black Watch (2006) integrates interviews taken with members of the Black Watch with dramatized versions of their stories and dance pieces. The piece originated in the Edinburgh Festival Fringe and was created by the National Theatre of Scotland and Gregory Burke. 8, a play by Dustin Lance Black, is an example that uses interviews and courtroom transcripts in order to reenact the legal argument and witness testimony of the Perry v. Schwarzenegger case.

In 2021, two verbatim theatre plays, Dana H. and Is This a Room ran on Broadway in repertory. Both plays had played at the Vineyard Theatre Off-Broadway during the 2019-2020 season, and were paired due to their similar nature as documentary theatre: Dana H., which was developed by the Civilians, was lip-synced to audio interviews with the playwright's mother, while Is This a Room was a verbatim recreation of whistleblower Reality Winner's interrogation by the FBI.

== Major examples of documentary theatre ==
=== Early 20th-century ===
- One-Third of a Nation (1938)

=== Mid 20th-century ===
- The Investigation (1965)
- In the Matter of J. Robert Oppenheimer (1969)

=== Late 20th- and early 21st-century ===
- Fires in the Mirror (1992)
- The Laramie Project (2000)
- The Exonerated (2000)
- The Guys (2001)
- Bystander 9/11 (2001)
- I Am My Own Wife (2003)
- The Permanent Way (2003)
- My Name Is Rachel Corrie (2005)
- The Judy Monologues (2010)
- 8 (2011)
- London Road (2011)
- Come from Away (2017)
- The Jungle (2018)
- Is This a Room (2019)
- Fatherland (2024)

== See also ==
- Docudrama
- Teatro di narrazione
