= Barney Norris =

British playwright and politician (born 1987)

Barney Norris FRSL (born 1987) is an English writer.

== Early life ==
Norris was born in Chichester in West Sussex, later moving to Wiltshire where he attended Bishop Wordsworth's School in Salisbury. He studied English at Keble College, Oxford, and creative writing at Royal Holloway, University of London.

== Career ==
After leaving university, he founded the touring Up in Arms Theatre Company with the director Alice Hamilton, and worked in the theatre as assistant to Thelma Holt, Michael Frayn, Peter Gill, and Max Stafford-Clark, before becoming a full-time writer. He is a lecturer in creative writing at the University of Oxford, and reviews fiction regularly for The Guardian.

== Writing ==
Norris's early plays were produced by his company Up in Arms, usually on tour and often in partnership with other theatres. Following the success of his first full-length play Visitors, he began to write for other companies, and has since worked with Salisbury Playhouse, and the Bush Theatre.

== Politics ==
In February 2024, Norris was announced as the Green Party of England and Wales candidate for the Salisbury constituency at the 2024 general election.

== Selected works ==
=== Fiction ===
- Five Rivers Met on a Wooded Plain (2016)
- Turning for Home (2018)
- The Vanishing Hours (2019)
- Undercurrent (2022)

=== Theatre ===
- Visitors (2014, Up in Arms Theatre Company, Arcola Theatre, Bush Theatre and tour; 2015, National Theatre Latvia; 2015, Martha's Vineyard; 2023, Watermill Theatre)
- Every You Every Me (2015, Salisbury Playhouse and tour; 2017, Oxford Playhouse, Reading Rep and tour)
- Eventide (2015, Up in Arms, Arcola Theatre and tour)
- Echo's End (2017, Salisbury Playhouse)
- While We're Here (2017, Up in Arms, Bush Theatre, BBC Radio 4 and tour)
- Nightfall (2018, Bridge Theatre)
- We Started to Sing (2022, Arcola Theatre)
- The Band Back Together (2024, Arcola Theatre)
- Going Out Out (2025, HOME Manchester)

=== Adaptations ===
- The Remains of the Day (2019, Out of Joint Theatre Company, Royal & Derngate, Oxford Playhouse and tour)
- Blood Wedding (after Lorca) (2019, LAMDA; 2020, Salisbury Playhouse; 2025, Omnibus Theatre)
- Second Best (2025, Riverside Studios)

=== Collaborations ===
- The Wellspring with David Owen Norris (2022, Royal & Derngate and tour)
- A Stranger Comes To Town with Ailie Robertson (2023, An Tobar and Mull Theatres and tour)
- The Last Ship with Sting (2026, world tour)

=== Radio ===
- While We're Here (2018, BBC Radio 4)
- Song and Dance (2019, BBC Radio 4)
- The Queen of the Isle of Wight (2021, BBC Radio 4)

=== Non-fiction ===
- To Bodies Gone: The Theatre of Peter Gill (2014)
- The Wellspring: Conversations with David Owen Norris (2018)
