= Up in Arms Theatre Company =

English theatre company

The Up In Arms Theatre Company was an English touring-theatre company from the South West of England.

The company was founded by the director Alice Hamilton and the writer Barney Norris, who first began working together when they met in their local youth theatre in Salisbury.

The company presented work in theatres, woods and village halls across the United Kingdom, in co-production or in association with the Arcola Theatre, the Bush Theatre, the Orange Tree Theatre, the Out of Joint Theatre Company, the North Wall Arts Centre and the Reading Rep Theatre.

The company was dissolved in 2022.

== Productions ==
- 2020 – Lorca's Blood Wedding retold by Barney Norris (a co-production with the Wiltshire Creative)
- 2019 – Needletail by Barney Norris (a short film produced by Kate Moore)
- 2019 – In Lipstick by Annie Jenkins (a co-production with the Pleasance Theatre and Ellie Keel)
- 2017 – The March on Russia by David Storey (a co-production with the Orange Tree Theatre)
- 2017 – While We're Here by Barney Norris (a co-production with the Bush Theatre and Farnham Maltings)
- 2016 – German Skerries by Robert Holman (a co-production with the Orange Tree Theatre in association with the Reading Rep Theatre)
- 2015 – Eventide by Barney Norris (a co-production with the Arcola Theatre in association with the North Wall Arts Centre)
- 2014-15 – Visitors by Barney Norris (Arcola Theatre, Bush Theatre and tour)
- 2012-13 – Fear of Music by Barney Norris (tour with the Out of Joint Theatre Company)
- 2011 – At First Sight by Barney Norris (tour and the Latitude Festival)
