= Claire Rafferty =

Claire Rafferty may refer to:

- Claire Rafferty (footballer)
- Claire Rafferty (actress)
