= The Last Rifleman =

2023 British film by Kevin Fitzpatrick

- Film poster
- Directed by: Terry Loane
- Written by: Kevin Fitzpatrick
- Produced by: Katy Jackson; John Leslie; Kevin Jackson
- Starring: Pierce Brosnan; John Amos; Clémence Poésy; Jürgen Prochnow
- Cinematography: Mark McCauley
- Edited by: John Walters
- Music by: Stephen Warbeck
- Production companies: Wee Buns Films; Ripple World Pictures; Ingenious Media; Singer Studios
- Distributed by: Sky Cinema
- Release date: 5 November 2023
- Running time: 99 minutes
- Country: United Kingdom
- Language: English
- Budget: $20 million
- Box office: $10,061

The Last Rifleman is a 2023 British drama film written by Kevin Fitzpatrick, loosely based on real events and directed by Terry Loane, which features Pierce Brosnan. It follows Artie Crawford (Brosnan), a Northern Irish World War II veteran who, on the 75th anniversary of the D-Day landings in Normandy, decides to secretly escape his care home and embarks on an arduous but inspirational journey from Northern Ireland to France, to pay his final respects to his best friend and find the courage to face the ghosts of his past.

The film is loosely based on the true story of British D-Day veteran Bernard Jordan, who left his care home in England to travel to France. Another film based on Jordan's story, The Great Escaper, starring Michael Caine, was released a few weeks earlier.

The Last Rifleman marked the final film appearance by John Amos prior to his death on August 21, 2024. The film did not have a theatrical release; it premiered on the Sky Cinema subscription service on 5 November 2023.

== Cast ==
- Pierce Brosnan as Artie Crawford
- Clémence Poésy as Juliette Bellamy
- Jürgen Prochnow as Friedrich Mueller
- John Amos as Lincoln Jefferson Adams
- Desmond Eastwood as Tony McCann
- Claire Rafferty as Vicky Tedjury
- Ian McElhinney as Tom Malcolmson
- Samuel Bottomley as Rory

== Production ==
In September 2020, it was announced that Brosnan would star in the film. In November 2020, it was announced that Louis Gossett Jr. and Jürgen Prochnow had been added to the cast. Gossett's role was later recast with John Amos. This film was Amos' final film appearance before his death in August 2024.

Principal photography finished in August 2022 in Belfast after six weeks of filming.

== Release ==
The film did not have a theatrical release; instead it was released on Sky Cinema on 5 November 2023.

== Reception ==
On the review aggregator website Rotten Tomatoes, 71% of 17 critics' reviews are positive.
