= The Permanent Way =

The Permanent Way is a play by David Hare first performed in 2003.

In 1991 the British government decided to privatise the country's railways. David Hare recounts the development through the first-hand accounts of those most intimately involved. From passengers to government ministers, their voices bear witness to a narrative of national mismanagement.

Inspired by Ian Jack's book The Crash That Stopped Britain ISBN 9781862074682, the play is a piece of verbatim theatre based on numerous interviews, by the actors themselves, of the people involved. Theatre director Max Stafford-Clark and transport journalist Christian Wolmar selected the interviewees. Collation and editing, with a little linking narration added, allowed the quotations to take the form of drama:

Why aren't people angry? They were robbed. What belonged to them was taken from them by a bunch of bankers and incompetent politicians. What was theirs was given away. What was foredoomed to fail failed. And they aren't angry.

Actor Lloyd Hutchison of Out of Joint, the original acting company, describes Hare's contribution thus: "He puts in very, very little bridging material. The play is really one statement after another. He hasn't exactly written it; he collated it.

Incidents covered in the play include the passing of the Railways Act 1993 setting out the structure of rail privatization and the survival and bereavement stories resulting from the rail crashes of Southall, Ladbroke Grove, Hatfield, and Potters Bar. One character is author Nina Bawden, who was badly injured in the Potters Bar crash in which her husband Austen Kark was killed.

The play first opened in York in November 2003, directed by Stafford-Clark. The production toured Britain in 2004, winning the "Best Touring Production" award from the Theatre Management Association. A version for radio, with the original director and cast members, was made by Catherine Bailey Productions and broadcast on BBC Radio 3 on 14 March 2004. It was runner up in the year's Sony Radio Academy Award for drama.

In September 2019 a "site specific" production, directed by Alexander Lass, was mounted in the Vaults Theatre, beneath the tracks of London Waterloo station.

== See also ==
- The Navigators (2001) - a Ken Loach film with the same theme
