= Road (play) =

Play by Jim Cartwright

- Original language: English
- Written by: Jim Cartwright
- Subject: Thatcher's Britain, Unemployment
- Setting: 1980s, A town in Northern England

Premiere
- Date: 1986
- Place: Royal Court Theatre Upstairs; London, England

Road is the first play written by Jim Cartwright, and was first produced in 1986 at the Royal Court Theatre Upstairs, directed by Simon Curtis.

The play explores the lives of the people in a deprived, working class area of Lancashire during the government of Margaret Thatcher, a time of high unemployment in the north of England. Despite its explicit nature, it was considered extremely effective in portraying the desperation of people's lives at this time, as well as containing a great deal of humour. Set on a road on a busy night, the audience delve into the houses on the street and the characters' lives.

The play is often performed on a promenade, allowing the audience to follow the narrator (Scullery) along the road and visit different sets and the different homes of the characters.

The play has won a number of awards and was voted the 36th best play of the 20th century in a poll by the Royal National Theatre.

== Notable productions ==
- After the initial performance at the Royal Court Theatre "Upstairs", with Edward Tudor-Pole as Scullery, the play moved "Downstairs" in 1987 with Ian Dury as the narrator.
- Road was produced in New York by Lincoln Center Theater at La MaMa in 1988, with a cast including Joan Cusack and Kevin Bacon.
- In 1989 the theatre company 7:84 performed a production of the play, directed by David Hayman.
- In 1994 the play was produced by Out of Joint theatre and directed by Max Stafford-Clark. The production toured the UK and performed at the Leicester Haymarket and the Royal Court.
- In 1995 Jim Cartwright directed a production at the Royal Exchange Theatre, Manchester with Bernard Wrigley and Matthew Dunster and Robin Weaver.
- In 1998 the play was performed by the players at Collegiate School, Bristol.
- In 2008 the play was revived at Bolton's Octagon Theatre, in a production directed by Noreen Kershaw and featuring Jim Cartwright's son James Cartwright as one of the actors.
- The play was revived at the Royal Court in 2017, directed by John Tiffany.
- In 2026 Selina Cartmell directed the revival at the Royal Exchange Theatre performed in the round, which marked the 40th anniversary of the play as well as being part of their 50th anniversary programme. Notably, this performance was adapted to not include the 'professor' character and involved the removal of some key scenes from the main theatre space into the pre-show.

== Film adaptation ==
Road was later directed by renowned director Alan Clarke for the BBC2 anthology series ScreenPlay. It starred many young actors who later became well-known, including Jane Horrocks, David Thewlis, Moya Brady and Lesley Sharp.
