= Fires in the Mirror =

Play by Anna Deavere Smith

Fires in the Mirror: Crown Heights, Brooklyn and Other Identities
- Original language: English
- Written by: Anna Deavere Smith
- Series: On the Road: A Search for the American Character
- Setting: Crown Heights, Brooklyn, New York City

Premiere
- Date: May 1, 1992
- Place: The Public Theater; New York City

Fires in the Mirror: Crown Heights, Brooklyn and Other Identities (1992) is a one-person play by Anna Deavere Smith, an African-American playwright, author, actress, and professor. It explores the Crown Heights riot (which occurred in Crown Heights, Brooklyn in August 1991) and its aftermath through the viewpoints of African-American and Jewish people, mostly based in New York City, who were connected directly and indirectly to the riot.

Fires in the Mirror is composed of monologues taken directly by Smith from transcripts of the interviews she conducted with the people whom she portrays in the play. She interviewed more than 100 individuals in the course of creating this play. It is considered a pioneering example of the genre known as verbatim theatre. It received the Drama Desk Award for Outstanding One-Person Show.

== Context ==
Anna Deavere Smith's play Fires in the Mirror is a part of her project On the Road: A Search for the American Character. It is a series of monologues which she has created from interviews. Fires in the Mirror chronicles the Crown Heights riot in Brooklyn, New York in August 1991. In that racially divided neighborhood, populated largely by African Americans and Chabad Hasidic Jews, a car driven by a Jewish man veered onto a sidewalk and struck two children, killing Gavin Cato, a 7-year-old Caribbean-American boy. The death, and what the African-American community perceived as a delayed response of city emergency medical personnel, sparked protests by them in the neighborhood. During these, a group of black youths attacked and fatally injured Yankel Rosenbaum, a Jewish student visiting from Australia. Days of rioting ensued, exposing to national scrutiny the depth of the racial divisions in Crown Heights. The rioting resulted in 190 injuries, 129 arrests, and an estimated one million dollars in property damage.

Smith interviewed residents of Crown Heights, including participants in the disturbances, as well as leading politicians, writers, musicians, religious leaders, and intellectuals. From this material, she chose which figures to highlight and speeches to use in the monologues of her play. Through the words of 26 different people, in 29 monologues, Smith explores how and why these people signaled their identities, how they perceived and responded to people different from themselves, and how barriers between groups can be breached. "My sense is that American character lives not in one place or the other", Smith writes in her introduction to the play, "but in the gaps between the places, and in our struggle to be together in our differences." The title of the play suggests a vision of art as a site of reflection where the passions and fires of a specific moment can be examined from a new angle, contemplated, and better understood.

== Characters ==
- Ntozake Shange: 42- to 45-year-old African-American playwright, poet, novelist.
- Anonymous Lubavitcher Woman: Jewish mid-thirties preschool teacher.
- George C. Wolfe: African-American playwright who was also director/producer of the New York Shakespeare Festival. (served 1993–2004)
- Aaron M. Bernstein: Jewish man in his fifties. Physicist at Massachusetts Institute of Technology.
- Anonymous Girl: A junior high, teen-age black girl of Haitian descent. Lives in Brooklyn. (near Crown Heights)
- The Reverend Al Sharpton: Well-known African-American New York activist and minister.
- Rivkah Siegal: Lubavitcher woman. Graphic designer. Age unspecified.
- Angela Davis: Prominent African-American activist in her late 40s. Author, orator, and scholar. Then a Professor in the History of Consciousness Department at the University of California, Santa Cruz.
- Monique 'Big Mo' Matthews: African-American rapper in Los Angeles.
- Leonard Jeffries: African-American Professor of African American Studies at City University of New York, where he was former chair of the department.
- Letty Cottin Pogrebin: Author and founding editor of Ms. Magazine. Of Jewish descent and in her fifties.
- Minister Conrad Mohammed: African-American minister of New York associated with the Nation of Islam; he later became a Baptist. He served as minister for Louis Farrakhan.
- Robert F. Sherman: Executive Director of the City of New York's Increase the Peace Corps (part of the Mayor's Office).
- Rabbi Joseph Spielman: Spokesperson in the Luabvitch community.
- Reverend Canon Doctor Heron Sam: African-American pastor at St. Mark's Crown Heights Church.
- Anonymous Young Man #1: resident of Crown Heights, Caribbean-American man in his late teens or early twenties.
- Michael S. Miller: Executive Director of the Jewish Community Relations Council.
- Henry Rice: Crown Heights resident.
- Norman Rosenbaum: Brother of Yankel Rosenbaum, an Australian.
- Anonymous Young Man #2: Crown Heights resident, an African-American young man in his late teens or early twenties.
- Sonny Carson: African-American activist.
- Rabbi Shea Hecht: middle-aged Lubavitcher rabbi, spokesperson.
- Richard Green: Director of the Crown Heights Youth Collective and Co-director of Project CURE (a black-Hasidic basketball team that was developed after the riots)
- Rosalynn Malamud: Lubavitcher resident of Crown Heights.
- Reuven Ostrov: Lubavitcher youth and member of project CURE, 17 years old at the time of the riot. He worked as an assistant chaplain at Kings County Hospital.
- Carmel Cato: Father of Gavin Cato, immigrant from Guyana and resident of Crown Heights.

== Synopsis ==
The play is a series of monologues based on interviews conducted by Smith with people involved in the Crown Heights crisis, both directly and as observers and commentators. Each scene is titled with the person's name and a key phrase from that interview. There are a total of 29 monologues in Fires in the Mirror and each one focuses on a character's opinion and point of view of the events and issues surrounding the crisis. Most characters have one monologue; the Reverend Al Sharpton, Letty Cottin Pogrebin and Norman Rosenbaum have two monologues each.

Fires in the Mirror is divided into themed sections. The themes include elements of personal identity, differences in physical appearance, differences in race, and the feelings toward the riot incidents. The overall arc of the play flows from broad personal identity issues, to physical identity, to issues of race and ethnicity, and finally ending in issues relating to the Crown Heights riot.

The play is structured as follows:

Identity

- The Desert – Ntozake Shange discusses Identity in terms of the self fitting into the community as a whole and the feeling of being separate from others but still somewhat a part of the whole.
- Static – An anonymous Lubavitcher woman tells a humorous story of getting a young black boy from the neighborhood to turn off their radio during the Sabbath because no one in their family was allowed to.
- 101 Dalmatians – George C. Wolfe talks about racial identity and argues that "blackness" is extremely different from "whiteness"

Mirrors

- Mirrors and Distortions – Aaron M. Bernstein intellectually theorizes how mirrors can distort images both scientifically and in literature.

Hair

- Look in the Mirror – An anonymous girl talks about how racial identity is extremely important in her school and the girls act, dress, and wear their hair according to the racial groups.
- Me and James's Thing – Al Sharpton explains that he promised James Brown he would always wear his hair straightened and that it was not due to anything racial.
- Wigs – Rivkah Siegal discusses the difficulty behind the custom of wearing wigs. She focuses on how she feels like she is not herself and that she is fake.

Race

- Rope – Angela Davis talks about the changes in history of Blacks and Whites and then continuing need to find ways to come together as people.

Rhythm

- Rhythm and Poetry – Rapper Monique Matthews discusses the perception of rap and the attitude toward women in the hip-hop culture. She explains the need for women in that culture to be more confident and not accept being viewed as sexual objects.

Seven Verses

- Roots – Leonard Jeffries describes his involvement in Roots, a television series about African-American family histories and the slave trade.
- Near Enough to Reach – Letty Cottin Pogrebin says that blacks attack Jews because Jews are the only ones that listen to them and do not simply ignore their attacks.
- Seven Verses – Minister Conrad Mohammed theorizes and explains that blacks are God's "chosen people", and expresses his views on the suffering of blacks at the hands of white people.
- Isaac – Pogrebin talks about her uncle Isaac, a Holocaust survivor, who was forced by the Nazis to load his wife and children onto a train headed for the gas chambers.
- Lousy Language – Robert Sherman explains that words like "bias" and "discrimination" are not specific enough, leading to poor communication.

Crown Heights, Brooklyn, August 1991

- No Blood in His Feet – Rabbi Joseph Spielman describes the riot events; he believes that Blacks lied about the events surrounding the death of the boy Cato in order to start antisemitic riots. He focuses on the malicious intent of the black kids who stabbed Rosenbaum.
- Mexican Standoff – The Reverend Canon Doctor Heron Sam says that he feels the Jewish community was unconcerned with the killing of Cato.
- Wa Wa Wa – Anonymous Young Man #1 explains his view on the differences of police contact with the Jewish and Black communities, and how he thinks there is no justice for blacks as Jews are never arrested.
- "Heil Hitler" – Michael S. Miller argues that the Black community is extremely antisemitic.
- Knew How to Use Certain Words – Henry Rice describes his personal involvement in the events and the injustice he suffered.
- My Brother's Blood – Norman Rosenbaum speaks at a rally about wanting justice for his brother's murder, and says that he doesn't believe the police are doing all that they can.
- Sixteen Hours Difference – Norman Rosenbaum talks about first hearing the news of his brother's death.
- Bad Boy – Anonymous Young Man #2 explains that the black kid who was blamed for Rosenbaum's murder was an athlete and therefore would not have killed anyone
- Chords – Sonny Carson describes his personal contributions in the black community, and how he is trying to teach blacks to act against the white power structure.
- Ovens – Rabbi Shea Hecht does not believe integration is the solution to the problems of race relations.
- Rain – Al Sharpton talks about trying to sue the driver who hit Gavin Cato, and complains about bias in the judicial system and the media.
- Rage – Richard Green says that there are no role models for black youths, leading to rage among them.
- The Coup – Roslyn Malamud blames the police and black leaders for letting the events and crisis get out of control.
- Pogroms – Reuven Ostrov describes how Jews got scared because there are "Jew-haters" everywhere.
- Lingering – Carmel Cato closes the play by describing the trauma of seeing his son die, and his resentment toward powerful Jews.

== Style ==
Fires in the Mirror is a collection of multiple voices and points of view. It is a hybrid of theater and journalism.

Smith provides information as to where each interview was done, including the settings and environment, other people who were near, and when the interviews took place. This emphasizes the fact that the play was drawn from the words of people who were directly involved with events.

The play is written as verse. Smith uses lines, ellipses, and other notation, to express how people expressed themselves in each interview.

Fires in the Mirror is a postmodern play. According to David Rush, characteristics of a postmodern play include the minimization of a single "author"; its purpose is to engage the audience rather than express one point of view. There may be multiple narratives interacting with each other, the structure departs from the conventional play pattern, and the play is usually fragmented. Fires in the Mirror encompasses all of these characteristics.

== Themes ==
=== Racial tensions ===
The central focus of Fires in the Mirror is the resentment anger between two ethnic groups in the densely populated area of Crown Heights, Brooklyn, in New York City: the Lubavitcher Orthodox Jewish community and the African-American community. The monologues refer to such historic events as The Holocaust of World War II and slavery history of the United States, defining periods for each ethnic group. In addition, they express the often-fraught relationships between the two ethnic groups and the police, as well as the perceptions of the relationships between each other.

=== Individual identity and attitudes ===
By showing many different points of view and opinions on the issue of the riot, the play highlights that there are not just two sides, divided by race, but rather many different individual attitudes, emotions, and opinions.

== Staging ==
Fires in the Mirror is staged as a one-person play. In the original production, there was no real physical set and Deavere used a limited number of props and costumes. Black-and-white photographs were displayed behind Smith as she moved from one monologue and character to the next. She slightly changed her appearance and mannerisms for each character. Throughout most of her performance, she was dressed in black pants and white shirt, and was barefoot.

Many of the monologues are accompanied by music, ranging from black hip hop to Jewish religious chants. The music is meant to pair with the author's background or the essence of each monologue.

== Production history ==
Smith presented a first workshop production of the play in December 1991 at George Wolfe's Festival of New Voices. Fires in the Mirror had its world premiere at the New York Shakespeare Festival on May 1, 1992. Its official press opening was on May 12, 1992.

Fires in the Mirror has also been produced by the American Repertory Theatre in Cambridge, Massachusetts; the McCarter Theatre in Princeton, New Jersey; Brown University, Stanford University, Royal Court Theatre in London, and many others. It was presented as part of the 1994 Melbourne International Arts Festival in Australia at the Victorian Arts Centre (now Arts Centre Melbourne).

== Television film ==
A film of the play was adapted under the direction of George C. Wolfe and starred Anna Deavere Smith. Aired in 1993, it was produced by Cherie Fortis and filmed by "American Playhouse" for PBS.

== Awards ==
It received the Drama Desk Award for Outstanding One-Person Show in 1993. In 1994, Deavere received the award again, for her Twilight: Los Angeles, 1992, another example of verbatim theatre, based on the 1992 Los Angeles riots.

Fires in the Mirror was also a finalist for the Pulitzer Prize (Drama) in 1993.

== See also ==
- Chabad in film and television

== Sources ==
- Denzin, N. K. (2001). "The reflexive interview and a performative social science" (PDF). Qualitative Research. 1 (1): 23–46. doi:10.1177/146879410100100102. S2CID 145284826. Archived from the original (PDF) on December 31, 2019.
