= Anna Deavere Smith =

African-American actress and playwright (born 1950)

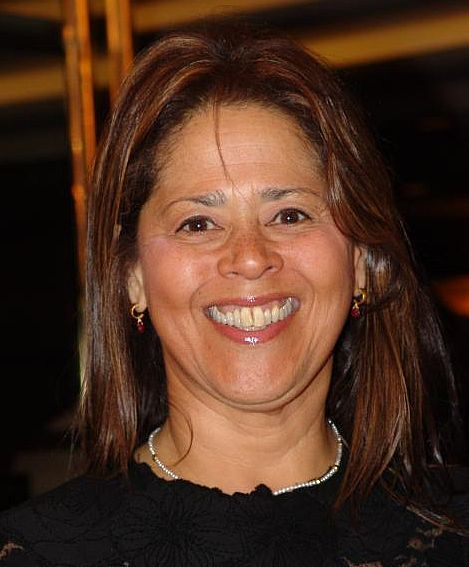
- Smith in 1999
- Born: September 18, 1950 (age 76); Baltimore, Maryland, U.S.
- Education: Arcadia University (BA); American Conservatory Theater (MFA)
- Occupations: Actress, playwright, professor
- Relatives: Basil Biggs (great-great-grandfather)
- Website: Official website Projects website

Anna Deavere Smith (born September 18, 1950) is an American actress, playwright, and professor. She is known for her roles as National Security Advisor Dr. Nancy McNally in The West Wing (2000–06), hospital administrator Gloria Akalitus in the Showtime series Nurse Jackie (2009–15), and U.S. District Court Clerk Tina Krissman on the ABC show For the People (2018–19).

Smith is a recipient of The Dorothy and Lillian Gish Prize (2013). In 2015 she was selected as the Jefferson Lecturer by the National Endowment for the Humanities. In 2016, she received a Guggenheim Fellowship in Theatre Arts. She is the founding director of the Institute on the Arts and Civic Dialogue at New York University.

== Early life and education ==
Smith was born in 1950 into an African-American family in Baltimore, Maryland, the daughter of Anna Rosalind (née Young), an elementary school principal, and Deaver Young Smith Jr., a coffee merchant. She has four younger siblings. She started attending school shortly after the city had started integrating the public schools, and attended both majority-black and majority-white schools during her elementary and middle school years. Smith is an alumna of the historic Western High School, an all-girls school.

Smith studied acting at Beaver College (now Arcadia University), where she was one of seven African-American women in her class, graduating in 1971. During her college career, she started to identify as Black. She earned a M.F.A. in acting from the American Conservatory Theater in San Francisco, California.

== Career ==
=== Theatre ===
At the beginning of her career, Smith appeared in a wide range of stage productions, including the role of Mistress Quickly in an Off-Broadway production of Shakespeare's The Merry Wives of Windsor with the Riverside Shakespeare Company, produced by Joseph Papp and the New York Shakespeare Festival. This production was set in New Orleans in post-Civil War America. For the role, Smith transformed herself into a "Cajun voodoo woman." She used her ability to take on other characters in her future work. From being in a variety of situations and in a kind of outsider status, she was a close observer of people and their language. She later told Henry Louis Gates Jr., when appearing on his show Finding Your Roots, that she had difficulty getting jobs at the beginning of her acting career because people did not know how to categorize her in terms of ethnicity for casting.

Smith is best known as a playwright and actress for her "documentary theatre" style, also called verbatim theatre, in plays such as Fires in the Mirror (1992) and Twilight: Los Angeles, 1992 (1993). Both featured Smith as the sole performer of multiple and diverse characters, based on interviews she had conducted with numerous residents and commentators in the two cities where riots took place. For these works, she won the Drama Desk Award for Outstanding One-Person Show two years in a row. She interviewed more than 100 people as part of her creation of Fires in the Mirror, which dealt with the 1991 Crown Heights riot. In 1992, she interviewed some 300 people as part of her research for creating Twilight: Los Angeles, 1992, which dealt with the 1992 Los Angeles riots after the acquittal of police officers who beat Rodney King, in events captured on tape. Both of these plays were constructed using material solely from interviews.

Smith's plays House Arrest (2000) and Let Me Down Easy (2008) were also created in this style. Let Me Down Easy, which explored the resiliency and vulnerability of the human body, debuted at the Long Wharf Theatre in January 2008. It was also performed at the American Repertory Theater in September and October 2008. A revised version of the show had its New York City premiere Off-Broadway at Second Stage Theatre in October 2009. It enjoyed favorable reviews and an extension into January 2010. It was a featured program as part of PBS's Great Performances series on January 13, 2012.

Smith debuted her one-woman play The Arizona Project in Phoenix, Arizona, in November 2008. The piece, which explored "women's relationships to justice and the law," was commissioned by Bruce Ferguson, director of Future Arts Research (F.A.R.), a new artist-driven research program at Arizona State University in Phoenix.

In 2009, Smith was an artist-in-residence with the Center for American Progress.

In Spring 2012, Smith was the first artist-in-residence at Grace Cathedral, San Francisco, a program founded by the Very Rev Jane Shaw, Dean of Grace Cathedral, who shared Smith's vision of "bringing together art and religion".

Commissioned by Grace Cathedral and the Cockayne Fund, Smith wrote and performed the play, On Grace, based on interviews relating to the meaning of God's grace. The performances were accompanied by American cellist Joshua Roman.

=== Film and television ===
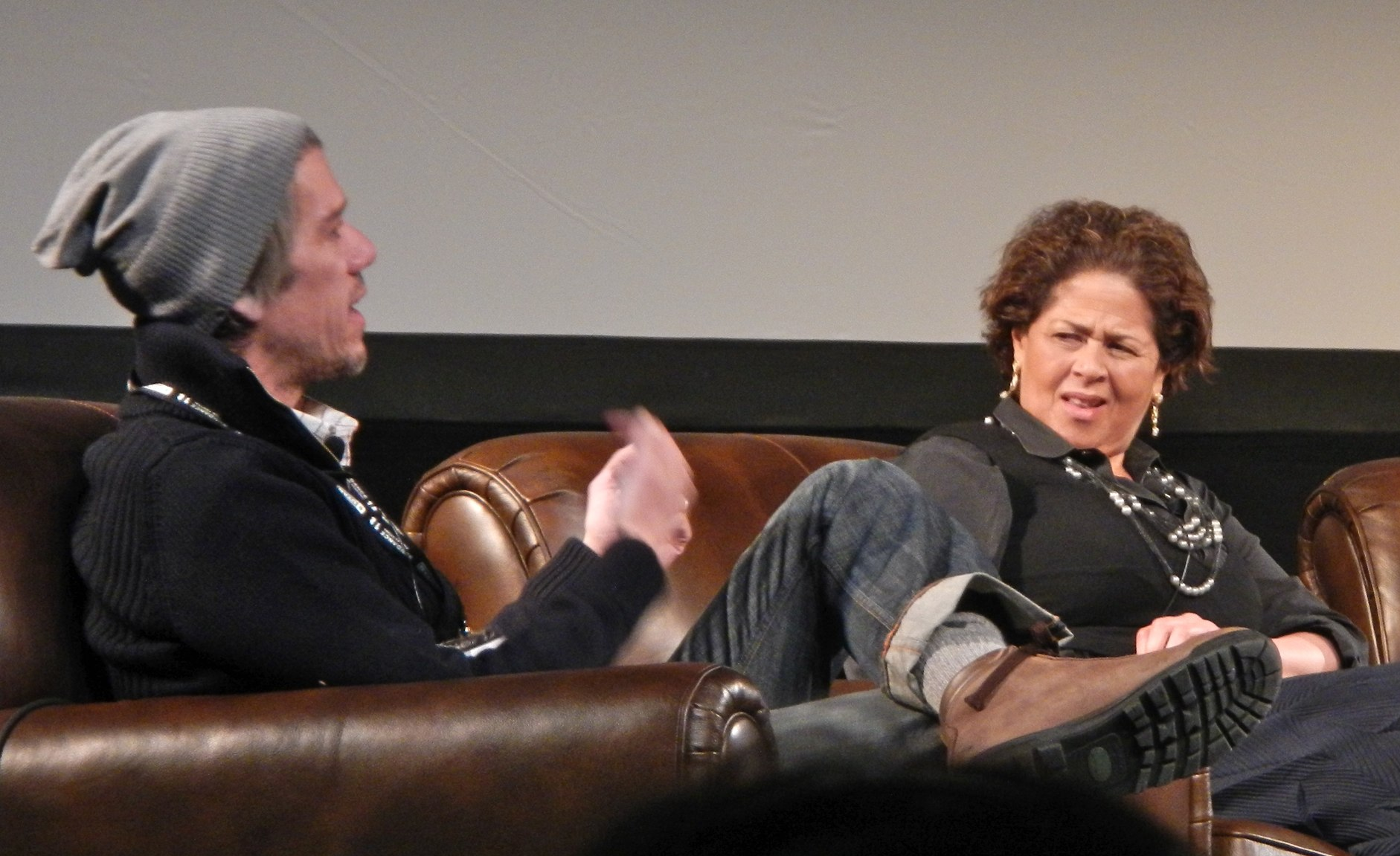
Stephen Gaghan and Smith at the 2012 Sundance Film Festival

Smith has appeared in several films, including Philadelphia (1993), Dave (1993), The American President (1995), Rent (2005), and Rachel Getting Married (2008).

She had recurring roles in the TV series The Practice (2000) and as Dr. Nancy McNally on The West Wing (2000–06). Smith also appeared as hospital administrator Gloria Akalitus in the Showtime dark comedy series Nurse Jackie, which premiered in June 2009. Early in her television career, she appeared on the long-running soap opera All My Children in the recurring role of "Hazel the shampoo girl".

In February 2014, Smith appeared as a mentor in Anna Deavere Smith: A YoungArts Masterclass, part of the HBO documentary series Masterclass.

In 2015, Smith appeared as a guest of Dr. Henry Louis Gates, Jr., on the PBS television show Finding Your Roots. Her ancestry in America was revealed to her for the first time. She was descended from a long line of free people of color. The most striking facts were linked to her great-great-grandfather, Basil Biggs, who was born in 1820 in Maryland. Biggs and his wife Mary were listed in the 1850 U.S. census to be free. His occupation was listed as veterinarian. In 1858, he moved his wife and four children to Pennsylvania, and chose to settle in Gettysburg. Another newsworthy article was found in The Cleveland Gazette (1892), which referred to Basil Biggs as the "wealthiest Afro-American in Gettysburg", mentioning his great home on 120 acres. 41% of Smith's European ancestry is from Great Britain, with remote Scandinavian, Finnish, Russian, Italian, and Greek.

In early 2017, Smith worked with Melissa McCarthy in the film Can You Ever Forgive Me? In New York City, they filmed one scene together in which their characters briefly reunite for the first time after the long-ago end of their relationship. Smith's character is a university professor of literature. In October 2018, this film was distributed to cinemas by Fox Searchlight Pictures.

In 2022, Smith played the supporting role of Maud in the Netflix series Inventing Anna.

=== Teacher ===
Smith teaches in the Department of Art & Public Policy at the Tisch School of the Arts at New York University. In 1986, she joined the faculty of the University of Southern California School of Dramatic Arts. From 1990 to 2000, she was a professor in the drama department at Stanford University and prior to that taught at Carnegie Mellon University. She also teaches at NYU School of Law.

=== Author ===
In 2000, Smith published her first book, Talk to Me: Travels in Media and Politics, through Random House. (It was published in paperback in 2001.) In 2006, she released Letters to a Young Artist: Straight-up Advice on Making a Life in the Arts – For Actors, Performers, Writers, and Artists of Every Kind.

In 2023, The Atlantic published the play This Ghost of Slavery: a Play of Past and Present in the December issue as part of the "On Reconstruction" project.

== Accolades and honors ==
As a dramatist, Smith was nominated for the Pulitzer Prize for Drama in 1993 for Fires in the Mirror, which won her a Drama Desk Award for Outstanding Solo Performance. She was nominated for two Tony Awards in 1994 for Twilight: one for Best Actress in a Play and another for Best Play. The play won her a Drama Desk Award for Outstanding Solo Performance and a Theatre World Award.

Smith was one of the 1996 recipients of the MacArthur Fellowship, often referred to as the "genius grant." She also won a 2006 Fletcher Foundation Fellowship for her contribution to civil rights issues, as well as a 2008 Matrix Award from the New York Women in Communications, Inc. In 2009, she won a Fellow Award in Theater Arts from United States Artists.

She has received honorary degrees from Loyola Marymount University, Dartmouth College, Swarthmore College, University of Pennsylvania, Spelman College, Arcadia University, Bates College, Smith College, Skidmore College, St. Olaf College, Macalester College, Occidental College, Pratt Institute, the College of the Holy Cross, Haverford College, Wesleyan University, School of Visual Arts, Northwestern University, Colgate University, California State University Sacramento, University of North Carolina at Chapel Hill, Wheelock College, Williams College, Yale University, and the Cooper Union.

The United Solo Theatre Festival board honored her with the award for outstanding solo performer during the inaugural edition in November 2010.

Smith won The Dorothy and Lillian Gish Prize (2013), one of the richest prizes in the American arts with a remuneration of $300,000.

In 2013, she received the 2012 National Humanities Medal from President Barack Obama. In 2015 the National Endowment for the Humanities selected her for the Jefferson Lecture, the U.S. federal government's highest honor for achievement in the humanities, delivering a lecture entitled "On the Road: A Search for American Character".

She was elected to the American Academy of Arts and Sciences in 2019.

In spring 2024, Smith delivered the 74th A.W. Mellon Lectures in the Fine Arts at the National Gallery of Art. The title of the series of four programs was "Chasing That Which Is Not Me / Chasing That Which Is Me."

== Works ==
=== Film ===
Year	Title	Role	Notes
1982	Soup for One	Deborah	
1983	Touched	Switch Board Operator	
1987	Unfinished Business	Anna	
1993	Dave	Mrs. Travis	
1993	Philadelphia	Anthea Burton	
1995	The American President	Robin McCall	
2000	Twilight: Los Angeles	Various	Writer and producer; adaptation of Smith's 1994 play
2003	The Human Stain	Mrs. Silk	
2004	The Manchurian Candidate	Political pundit	
2005	Cry Wolf	Headmaster Tinsley	
2005	Rent	Mrs. Jefferson	
2007	The Kingdom	Maricella Canavesio	
2007	Life Support	Mrs. Wallace	
2008	Rachel Getting Married	Carol	
2010	Seizing Justice: The Greensboro 4	Narrator	
2018	Can You Ever Forgive Me?	Elaine	
2021	Flora & Ulysses	Dr. Meescham	
2021	Here Today	Dr. Vidor	
2023	Ghosted	Claudia Yates	

=== Television ===
Year	Title	Role	Notes
1983	All My Children	Hazel	
1997	American Experience	Narrator	Episode: "Hawaii's Last Queen"
2000	The Practice	Kate Brunner	4 episodes
2000–2006	The West Wing	Dr. Nancy McNally	20 episodes
2001	100 Centre Street	Ms. Davis	Episode: "No Good Deed Goes Unpunished"
2001	Life 360	Herself	Episode: "Six Degrees of Separation"
2002	Presidio Med	Dr. Letty Jordan	4 episodes
2009–2015	Nurse Jackie	Gloria Akalitus	78 episodes
2013	The Surgeon General	Vice President	TV movie
2014	Anna Deavere Smith: A YoungArts Masterclass	Herself / Mentor	Documentary
2015–2022	Black-ish	Alicia	10 episodes
2015	Madam Secretary	Attorney General Mary Campbell	Episode: "Tamerlane"
2016	Law & Order: Special Victims Unit	Warden Lucille Fenton	Episode: "Nationwide Manhunt"
2016	Legends of Tomorrow	Cinnamon / Chay-Ara (19th century incarnation)	Episode: "The Magnificent Eight"
2016	BoJack Horseman	Betty Bruce	Episode: "Stop the Presses"
2016	Berlin Station	Polygraph Examiner	Episode: "False Negative"
2018–2019	For the People	Tina Krissman	20 episodes
2020	A West Wing Special to Benefit When We All Vote	Nancy McNally	TV special
2022	Inventing Anna	Maud	8 episodes

=== Theater ===
Year	Title	Role	Location	Notes
1974	Horatio	The savage	American Conservatory Theater	
1976	Alma, the Ghost of Spring Street	Marie Laveau	La MaMa Experimental Theatre Club	
1980	Mother Courage and Her Children	Kiowa woman / Their children	New York Shakespeare Festival	
1982–83	On the Road		Clear Space Theatre; Berkeley Repertory Theatre	
1983	The Merry Wives of Windsor	Mistress Quickly		Off-Broadway
1983	A Birthday Party and Aunt Julia's Shoes		Ward-Nasse Gallery	Original poems
1983	Tartuffe	Doreen	Geva Theatre Center	
1984	Charlayne Hunter Gault		Ward-Nasse Gallery	
1984	Aye, Aye, Aye, I'm Integrated		The American Place Theatre	
1985	Building Bridges, Not Walls		National Conference of Women and the Law	
1986	On the Road, ACT		American Conservatory Theater	
1988	Voices of Bay Area Women		Phoenix Theatre, San Francisco; American Conservatory Theater	
1988	Chlorophyll Post-Modernism and the Mother Goddess / A Conversation		Hahn Cosmopolitan Theatre	
1992	Fires in the Mirror	Various	The Public Theater	Writer; one-woman show
1994	Twilight: Los Angeles, 1992	Various	Cort Theatre	Writer; one-woman show
1997, 1999	House Arrest		Arena Stage; Mark Taper Forum	Writer
2008	The Arizona Project	Various	Herberger Theater Center	Writer; one-woman show
2008–10	Let Me Down Easy	Various	Long Wharf Theatre; American Repertory Theater; Second Stage Theatre	Writer; one-woman show
2014	On Grace	Various	Harris Theater	Writer; collaboration with Joshua Roman
2015	Reclaiming Grace in the Face of Adversity	Various		One-woman show
2015	Never Givin' Up		The Broad Stage	One-woman show
2015	Notes from the Field: Doing Time in Education — The California Chapter	Various	Berkeley Repertory Theatre	One-woman show
2016	Notes from the Field: Doing Time in Education	Various	American Repertory Theatre	One-woman show
2016	Notes from the Field: Doing Time in Education	Various	Second Stage Theatre	One-woman show Special Citation from the Obie Awards
2026	Basil Biggs		Wilma Theater	Workshop production produced by ArtPhilly

=== Bibliography ===
- Talk to Me: Travels in Media and Politics. New York: Random House. 2000. ISBN 978-0-3755-0150-0.
- Letters to a Young Artist: Straight-up Advice on Making a Life in the Arts – For Actors, Performers, Writers, and Artists of Every Kind. New York: Random House. 2006. ISBN 978-1-4000-3238-9.
