= Stella Feehily =

Irish playwright

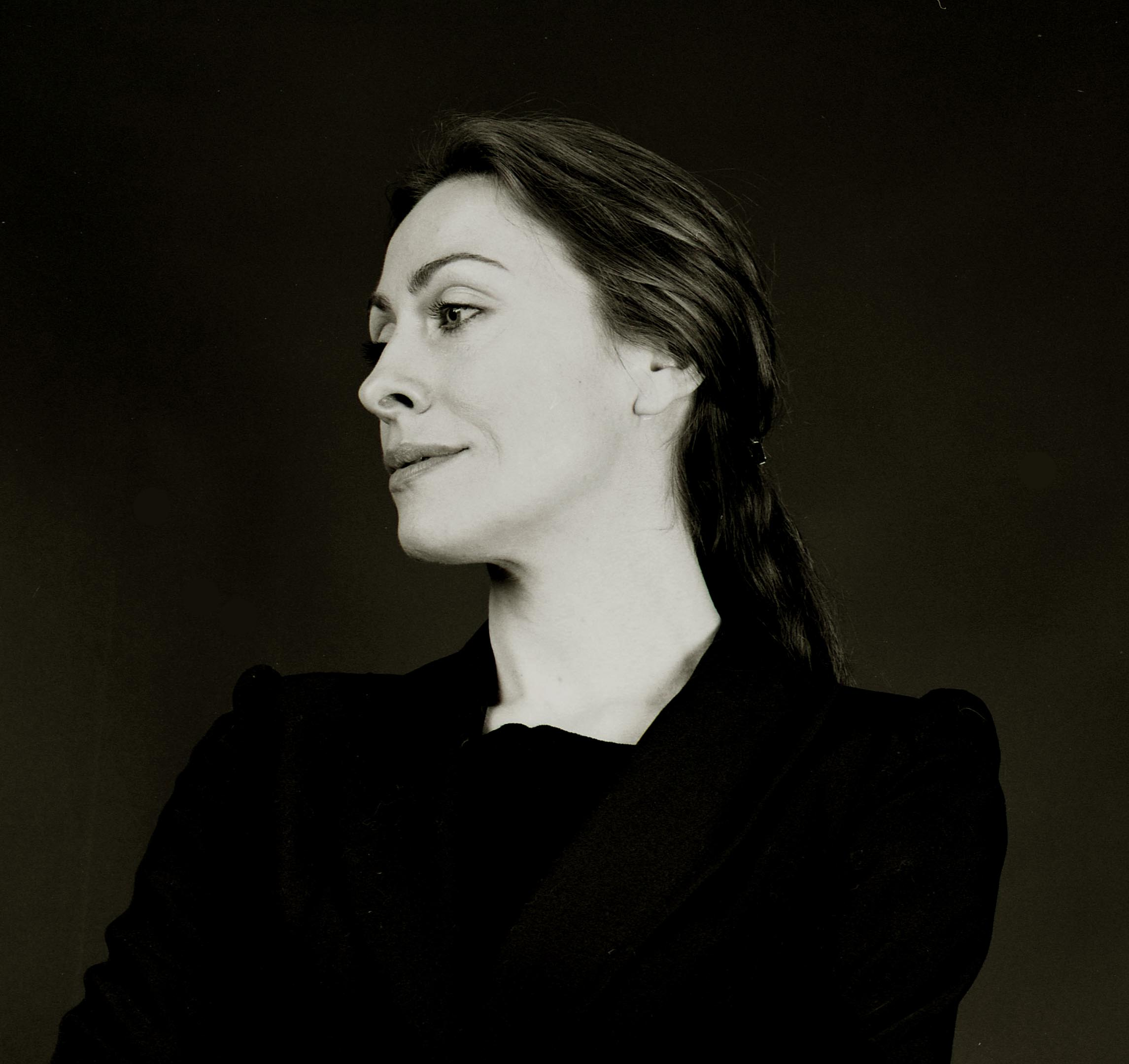
Stella Feehily

Stella Anne Feehily (born 1969, in London) is an Irish playwright and actor. Her plays include Game (2003), which was produced by Fishamble Theatre company, Dublin, and was published in an anthology of first plays by New Island. She is the author of Duck (2003) and O Go My Man (2006), both of which were first performed in co-productions by Out of Joint theatre company and the Royal Court Theatre. O Go My Man was a co-winner of the Susan Smith Blackburn award in 2006.

With four other female writers she co-wrote Catch (2006) (Royal Court Theatre), and for the Royal Court's Rough Cuts season wrote Think Global, Fuck Local, about the social and sexual lives of NGO and aid workers.

In 2009, Feehily's play Dreams of Violence, which is published by Nick Hern Books, received its premiere in a co-production between Soho Theatre and Out of Joint.

Her radio plays include Julia Roberts Teeth (2003), which was broadcast on BBC Radio 3, and Sweet Bitter (2003), broadcast on Lyric Radio in association with Fishamble Theatre company,

Feehily was previously an actress, and played regular character Sorcha Byrne in Irish soap opera Fair City. She is married to the British theatre director Max Stafford-Clark.
