= Bernard Jordan =

British World War II veteran known as "The Great Escaper"

- Born: 21 June 1924; Brighton, England
- Died: 30 December 2014 (aged 90)
- Occupations: Royal Navy veteran, electrician
- Known for: "The Great Escaper" – travelling to Normandy for D-Day commemorations in 2014
- Spouse: Irene Jordan (died 2015)

Bernard Jordan (21 June 1924 – 30 December 2014) was a British Royal Navy veteran of the Second World War. He gained widespread public and media attention in June 2014 when, at the age of 89, he left his care home in Hove without permission to attend the 70th-anniversary commemorations of the D-Day landings in France. His journey, undertaken independently after official veteran trips were full, was widely reported in national and international news, earning him the nickname "The Great Escaper". His story was later the inspiration for two feature films.

== Early life and military service ==
Bernard Jordan was born in Brighton, England, on 21 June 1924. During the Second World War, he served as a Royal Navy electrician aboard the destroyer HMS Eskimo. He served on Arctic convoys and was present for the D-Day landings in June 1944.

== The 2014 D-Day journey ==
In June 2014, Jordan was a resident at The Pines care home in Hove, East Sussex. Wishing to attend the 70th-anniversary events in Normandy, he discovered that the official trip organized by the Royal British Legion was fully booked.

On 5 June 2014, he left the home under the pretense of a routine trip into town, wearing his war medals under his raincoat, and travelled to Portsmouth to catch a ferry to Caen, France. When he failed to return, care home staff, concerned for his welfare, reported him missing to Sussex Police, who issued a public appeal.

On board the ferry, Jordan was assisted by fellow traveller Jon Orrell and his family, who helped arrange his accommodation in Normandy and his attendance at the commemorations at Sword Beach in Ouistreham. He visited the Grand Bunker Museum to pay his respects to fallen comrades.

== Media coverage and public response ==
The story of his independent journey, juxtaposed with the police missing person appeal, was picked up by major national news outlets including the BBC, ITV, The Independent, and The Guardian, as well as international media. Upon his safe return, the narrative shifted to celebration. The care home stated they were "pleased he was able to make the journey."

The incident resonated with the public as a symbol of the determination of the wartime generation. Days later, on his 90th birthday, he received over 2,500 cards from well-wishers around the world.

== Death and legacy ==
Bernard Jordan died on 30 December 2014, aged 90. His wife of over 60 years, Irene Jordan, died seven days later on 6 January 2015, aged 88. In their wills, the couple left their estate to the Royal National Lifeboat Institution (RNLI).

Jordan's story inspired two films:

- The Last Rifleman (2023), starring Pierce Brosnan, is a fictional story loosely inspired by the event.
- The Great Escaper (2023), starring Michael Caine as Jordan and Glenda Jackson as his wife Irene, is a direct dramatisation of his journey.

== See also ==
- D-Day
- D-Day naval deceptions
