= Twilight: Los Angeles, 1992 =

1994 one-woman play

Twilight: Los Angeles 1992
- Original language: English
- Written by: Anna Deavere Smith
- Characters: various
- Subject: Los Angeles Uprising of 1992
- Genre: One-person show
- Setting: Los Angeles, California

Premiere
- Date: June 13, 1993
- Place: Mark Taper Forum, Los Angeles

Twilight: Los Angeles, 1992 is a one-woman play written and originally performed by Anna Deavere Smith, an American actress, playwright and professor. It is about the infamous 1992 Los Angeles riots.

It was originally commissioned by the Mark Taper Forum in Los Angeles and premiered there in 1993. The original Broadway production opened at the Cort Theatre in New York City on April 17, 1994, and ran for 72 performances.

The play is composed of a series of monologues by real people connected directly and indirectly to the uprising. Smith chose the texts of the monologues and the subjects from interviews that she had conducted with more than 300 individuals in the process of researching the play. It is considered an example of the genre of verbatim theatre. The play was nominated in 1994 for a Tony Award for Best Play. It won the Drama Desk Award for Outstanding One-Person Show, Smith's second such honor in two years.

A 2021 off-Broadway revival, produced by Signature Theatre Company at the Pershing Square Signature Center in New York was well-received and won the Lucille Lortel Award for Outstanding Revival, out of four nominations.

== Conception ==
Smith interviewed some 300 people to gain opinions and viewpoints about the events related to the 1992 riots. From these interviews, she chose numerous subjects to feature as characters of the play, including such public officials as LAPD chief Daryl Gates and Congresswoman Maxine Waters; a nameless juror on the Rodney King police trial, which ended in the acquittal of police officers in his attack and was a catalyst for the riots; various victims and instigators of violence in South Central, including white truck driver Reginald Denny, who was beaten; and residents of greater Los Angeles with their own view of the events, including singer Jessye Norman and actor Charlton Heston. She memorized and delivered words in Korean to portray a Korean-American woman whose business had been burned.

Twilight takes its name from Twilight Bey, the Watts Gang Truce Activist. It is a direct successor to Smith's previous play, Fires in the Mirror (1992), which is also a one-woman play composed of monologues taken from interview transcripts. Fires in the Mirror is related to the Crown Heights riot of 1991 in Brooklyn, New York. Both plays are considered trailblazers in a genre that has become known as verbatim theatre.

== Productions ==
Smith recreated her roles in a filmed production entitled Twilight: Los Angeles (2000), directed by Marc Levin. It was aired on the PBS series Stage on Screen and in some theaters.

In April 2012 Smith returned to Los Angeles to take part in a "community conversation" marking the 20th-anniversary of the riot. It was sponsored by the nonprofit organization Facing History and Ourselves, and was to be held at Robert F. Kennedy Community High School's Cocoanut Grove Theater at 701 S. Catalina Street. In 2012, Katselas Theatre Company mounted a production of Twilight at the Skylight Music Theatre, with a "multiethnic cast of 25 performing many of the characters originally all portrayed by Smith".

Watts Village Theater Company launched "Riot/Rebellion," a multi-year project exploring three episodes of L.A. civil unrest: the 1965 Watts uprising, "the 1992 conflagration and the 1943 Zoot Suit riots, in which non-Latino white U.S. servicemen brawled with Mexican Americans and African Americans."

There was a reimagined production of Twilight : Los Angeles 1992 in March 2023, at The Mark Taper Forum in Los Angeles. Directed by Gregg T. Daniel, it featured a five member ethnically diverse cast in the roles Ms. Devere-Smith had played in the original production.

== Awards and nominations ==
The original production was nominated for the 1994 Tony Award for Best Play, losing to Angels in America: Perestroika. Smith was nominated for the Tony Award for Best Actress in a Play, losing to Diana Rigg in Medea. Twilight won the Drama Desk Award for Outstanding One-Person Show, Smith's second such honor in two years.

The 2021 off-Broadway revival won the Lucille Lortel Award for Outstanding Revival, out of four nominations.

=== Original Broadway production ===
Year	Award	Category	Nominee	Result	Ref.
1994	Tony Awards	Best Play		Nominated	
1994	Tony Awards	Best Performance by a Leading Actress in a Play	Anna Deavere Smith	Nominated	
1994	Drama Desk Awards	Outstanding Solo Performance	Anna Deavere Smith	Won	
1994	Drama Desk Awards	Outstanding Sound Design	John Gromada	Nominated	
1994	Drama Desk Awards	Outstanding Special Effects	Batwin & Robin Productions	Nominated	

=== 2021 Off-Broadway revival ===
Year	Award	Category	Nominee	Result	Ref.
2022	Lucille Lortel Awards	Outstanding Revival		Won	
2022	Lucille Lortel Awards	Outstanding Director	Taibi Magar	Nominated	
2022	Lucille Lortel Awards	Outstanding Ensemble	Elena Hurst, Wesley T. Jones, Francis Jue, Karl Kenzler, Tiffany Rachelle Stewart	Nominated	
2022	Lucille Lortel Awards	Outstanding Sound Design	Darron L. West	Nominated	
