= Bystander 9/11 =

Documentary play drawn from 9/11 experiences in NYC

Bystander 9/11: A Theatre Piece Concerning the Events of September 11, 2001 is a documentary theatre piece by Israeli-American playwright Meron Langsner, drawn primarily from his experiences during the September 11 attacks in New York City. It was performed on the first anniversary of the attacks in New York City by the Episcopal Actors Guild at Church of the Transfiguration, Episcopal (Manhattan) and at Brandeis University and has since been performed throughout the United States and the English speaking world. It was included in The Methuen Anthology of Testimonial Plays, published by Bloomsbury Publishing in 2013, and was later published in an acting edition and licensed by American publisher YouthPLAYS in early 2021. It has also been accepted to the permanent collection of the National September 11th Memorial and Museum in New York City. The play is written as a testimony of events starting from moments before the impact and continuing to describe NYC in the immediate aftermath, including the return to work in the offices of the Financial District. It requires a minimum of three performers (a narrator and two "New Yorkers") but is typically expanded to anywhere up to fifteen actors with different divisions of text.

This play is notable in that Langsner was the only dramatist known to have physically been at the event who created a play based on his first person account, and also in its longevity as a testimonial performance text decades after the facts it recorded, as well as that it is extremely New York City centric but has enjoyed productions throughout the US and abroad. He claims to have finished the first draft before the end of the month the attacks took place. Many performances of the play took place on anniversaries of the attacks themselves and were the centerpiece of a day of community events. It has primarily been popular with educational institutions, with a handful of professional performances. The play has been cited in numerous scholarly works regarding both testimonial/documentary theatre and responses to the attacks or war itself. He later drew from the same experiences to write the play Over Here, which dramatized the friendship between an Israeli immigrant and a Palestinian-American in a Post-9/11 NYC and which was performed at the New York International Fringe Festival and later published in an acting edition by Next Stage Press.
