= Ronald Frame =

Scottish novelist, short story writer and dramatist

Ronald Frame (born 23 May 1953) is a Scottish novelist, short story writer, and dramatist. He was educated in Glasgow, and at Oxford University.

He has written many original plays and adaptations (most recently The Other Simenon) for BBC Radio. His serial The Hydro (three series) was a popular success. A radio memoir of growing up in 50s and 60s Scottish suburbia, Ghost City, transferred to BBC Television. Unwritten Secrets, a novel and his fifteenth book of fiction, was published in 2010.

His first TV film Paris won the Samuel Beckett Award and PYE’s ‘Most Promising Writer New to Television’ Award.

His papers, to 2000, can be accessed at the National Library of Scotland in Edinburgh.

Fuller biographical details appear in Who’s Who (A & C Black), and in Debrett’s People of Today and International Who’s Who.

== Selected works ==
- Havisham, Picador, 2013
- Time in Carnbeg, Polygon 2004, ISBN 0-9544075-5-5
- Permanent Violet, Polygon 2002, ISBN 0-7486-6321-5
- The Lantern Bearers, Duckworth 1999, 2001, ISBN 0-7156-3133-0
- The Sun on the Wall, Hodder & Stoughton 1994, Sceptre 1995, ISBN 0-340-62858-8
- Walking my Mistress in Deauville (A Novella and Nine Stories,) Hodder & Stoughton 1992, Sceptre 1993, ISBN 0-340-57971-4
- Underwood and After, Hodder & Stoughton 1991, Sceptre 1992, ISBN 0-340-56540-3
- Bluette, Hodder & Stoughton 1990, Sceptre 1991, ISBN 0-340-55109-7
- Penelope's Hat, Hodder & Stoughton 1989, Sceptre 1990, ISBN 0-340-52455-3
- Paris, Faber and Faber 1987, ISBN 0-571-14776-3
- A Woman of Judah, (a Novel and Fifteen Stories) Bodley Head 1987, Sceptre 1989, ISBN 0-340-50071-9
- Sandmouth People, Bodley Head 1987, Sceptre 1988, ISBN 0-340-42320-X
- A Long Weekend with Marcel Proust (Seven Stories and a Novel) Bodley Head 1986, Sceptre 1988, ISBN 0-340-42891-0
- Watching Mrs Gordon, and Other Stories Bodley Head 1985, Triad Grafton 1987, ISBN 0-586-06998-4
- Winter Journey, Bodley Head 1984, Triad Grafton 1985, Sceptre 1993, ISBN 0-340-57973-0
