= Ezra Swerdlow =

Film producer

- Born: March 2, 1953; Great Neck, Long Island, New York, U.S.
- Died: January 23, 2018 (aged 64); Boston, Massachusetts, U.S.
- Occupations: Film producer, production manager
- Years active: 1980-2018

Ezra Swerdlow (March 2, 1953 – January 23, 2018) was an American film producer and production manager.

In 1980, he served as a unit manager on the Woody Allen film Stardust Memories. He co-owned Schindler/Swerdlow Productions in New York.

== Filmography ==
He was a producer in all films unless otherwise noted.

=== Film ===
Year	Film	Credit	Notes
1987	Radio Days	Associate producer	
1987	Spaceballs	Co-producer	
1989	The January Man		
1990	Everybody Wins	Co-producer	
1991	Life Stinks	Executive producer	
1992	Alien 3	Executive producer	
1993	The Good Son	Executive producer	
1995	Waiting to Exhale		
1996	The First Wives Club	Executive producer	
1997	Cop Land		
1997	Wag the Dog	Executive producer	
1998	Return to Paradise	Executive producer	
1999	Whiteboyz		
2000	Twilight: Los Angeles		
2001	Brooklyn Babylon		
2002	Easter	Executive producer	
2003	Head of State	Executive producer	
2004	Secret Window	Executive producer	
2005	Little Manhattan	Executive producer	
2006	Invincible	Executive producer	
2007	Enchanted	Executive producer	
2008	Ghost Town	Executive producer	
2009	Zombieland	Executive producer	
2010	When in Rome	Executive producer	
2011	The Smurfs	Executive producer	
2012	21 Jump Street	Executive producer	
2013	The Smurfs 2	Executive producer	
2014	The Equalizer	Executive producer	
2015	Southpaw	Executive producer	Final film as a producer

Production manager

Year	Film	Role
1980	Stardust Memories	Unit manager
1981	Arthur	Assistant unit production manager
1982	The King of Comedy	Unit manager
1983	Zelig	Unit manager
1984	Broadway Danny Rose	Unit production manager
1984	The Muppets Take Manhattan	Production manager
1986	Hannah and Her Sisters	Production manager
1986	Heartburn	Production manager
1996	The First Wives Club	Production manager
1998	Return to Paradise	Unit production manager
2005	Little Manhattan	Unit production manager
2009	Zombieland	Unit production manager
2012	The Vow	Production manager
2015	Southpaw	Unit production manager

Second unit director or assistant director

Year	Film	Role
1987	Radio Days	First assistant director

As an actor

Year	Film	Role
1995	Waiting to Exhale	Wild Bill

Location management

Year	Film	Role
1982	Tootsie	Location manager

Thanks

Year	Film	Role
2017	Rough Night	Special thanks

=== Television ===
Year	Title	Credit	Notes
2000	The Huntress	Co-executive producer	
2011	Too Big to Fail		Television film
