= Talking to Terrorists =

2005 play

Talking to Terrorists is a play written by Robin Soans. It was first performed at the Theatre Royal, Bury St. Edmunds, England, on 21 April 2005. The play is written in the style of verbatim theatre where all of the dialogue is taken from real interviews and then recreated on stage. The play discusses the importance of resolving terrorism not with violence or conflict, but with negotiations and peaceful discussions.

== Context ==
Robin Soans took a year to write Talking to Terrorists, he wanted to bring light to an important issue he discovered while undertaking interviews. He mentions in the preface to his play that a relief worker had arrived at a village which had been recently destroyed. When the relief worker talked with the villagers, the relief worker discovered that the villagers were not angry because they were hungry and homeless, but because they had a story that no one would listen to. The relief worker mentioned to Soans, "A huge part of what we call terrorism arises from no-one listening." Soans wanted to emphasise not just the unheard stories of former terrorists throughout the play, but he wanted the audience to hear the tales of everyone involved and affected by terrorism.

== Plot synopsis ==
The play opens up with SS1 and her husband discussing terrorism as a whole, Phoebe and Edward then discuss children involved in terrorism and the politics of it. Phoebe leaves and Edward talks about the difficulties of being a young Muslim in Luton, which leads to a sort of flashback conversation between four Muslim boys named Momsie, Aftab, Faiser, and Jab. After Edward's conversation, the five ex-terrorists (formerly members of the Irish Republican Army, the Ulster Volunteer Force, the Kurdish Workers Party, the National Resistance Army from Uganda, and the Al-Aqsa Martyrs Brigade from Bethlehem) discuss their stories involving where they grew up and how they first became involved with terrorism. The four men and one woman exchange tales about their early years, some went to prison the majority of their young lives, while others held meetings with their groups members to discuss issues in their communities and governments. Act One ends with the Bethlehem schoolgirl talking about her life in Israel around Christmas and how she feels hostility towards local soldiers.

Act Two begins with the ex-ambassador and his partner Nodira talking about the ambassador's duties. They recollect the first time the two met and the conflict of interests their relationship had on the ambassador's profession. The ex-ambassador also discusses the military's intelligence and their reliance upon information gathered through torture. He states his concern in a letter sent to London, which reads, “we are selling our souls for dross.” The ex-ambassador specifically states later that the evidence gathered under torture is incorrect and is morally wrong for London to support the American position by working with and using the American information. The play goes into a flashback of the ex-ambassador's earlier years when he discusses with Linda, Matthew, and Michael about London's information sharing, this conversation eventually leads the ambassador to come to the conclusion that it would be immoral to continue in his role.

Soans ex-Ambassador is based on verbatim quotes from Craig Murray, the former British Ambassador to Uzbekistan, and his wife Nadira. Murray later used much of this material in his memoir Murder in Samarkand (2006). It was used again by Sir David Hare for his play Murder in Samarkand.

== Genre ==
Talking to Terrorists is written in the form of verbatim theatre which consists of actors repeating the same words, movements, and accents that had been previously recorded in an interview or court hearings. This style of theatre allows the audience to see the characters as genuine people rather than fictitious creations. All of the characters in Talking to Terrorists consist of actual interviews from ex-members of terrorist groups, politicians, military officials, and victims of terrorism.

== Style ==
The style of Talking to Terrorists is realism, since all of the characters, sets, and words involved with the play come from real events, places, and people. David Rush describes realism as, “a style that attempts to depict life on stage as it is actually lived by the members of the audience.” Realism in this play truly depicts life, since the events and characters represent real people and their stories. This sort of docudrama/verbatim theatre play feeds off of its ability to “live in a world like ours… [and] appear logical and believable.” Rush also explains that realism applies to three rules, the unity of time, place, and action to be perceived as believable.

Unity of Time: Talking to Terrorists involve actual dialogues from actual people that occur in a constant flow of real time, essentially meaning that all of the stories happen in real time, rather than the course of several days, thus creating the impression on the audience that all of the events are unfolding before them in the course of two hours.

Unity of Place: All of the characters come into the same space and more often than not, the same set, and by doing so creates a reality for the audience that the locations do not change randomly, and the audience is viewing a real space in front of them.

Unity of Actions: The play tells essentially on plot from the perspective of several characters, although they all tell different stories, the play itself follows only one plot without any sort of subplot. Because Soans’ play follows these three unities, the play is considered realism in both a literal and technical sense.

== Selected production history ==
- Theatre Royal, Bury St. Edmunds (21–23 April 2005)
- Oxford Playhouse (26–30 April 2005)
- Malvern Theatres (4–7 May 2005)
- West Yorkshire Playhouse, Leeds (10–14 May 2005)
- Library Theatre, Manchester (17–21 May 2005)
- New Wolsey Theatre, Ipswich (24–28 May 2005)
- Warwick Arts Centre, Coventry (1–4 June 2005)
- Salisbury Playhouse (14–18 June 2005)
- Liverpool Everyman (21–25 June 2005)
- Royal Court, London (30 June 2005)

== Bibliography ==
Reviews

- http://www.onlinereviewlondon.com/index.php?option=com_content&view=article&id=219:talking-to-terrorists&catid=165:talking-to-terrorists&Itemid=247
- http://www.britishtheatreguide.info/reviews/talkterror-rev.htm
- https://www.independent.co.uk/arts-entertainment/theatre-dance/reviews/talking-to-terrorists-playhouse-oxford-222420.html
- https://web.archive.org/web/20081007063639/http://www.outofjoint.co.uk/prods/reviews_t2t.html

Interviews

- https://www.independent.co.uk/news/people/profiles/the-5minute-interview-robin-soans-writer-and-actor-403410.html
- http://www.eventguide.ie/articles.elive?session_id=12043075360&sku=070317103739
- https://web.archive.org/web/20080829212744/http://www.britishtheatreguide.info/otherresources/interviews/RobinSoans.htm
