= The Big Fellah (play) =

The Big Fellah is a play by Richard Bean about Irish-Americans in New York. The premier production is an Out of Joint and Lyric Hammersmith production, directed by Max Stafford-Clark and starting on 2 September 2010.

== Plot summary ==
The play is set in New York in 1972, where young fireman Michael Doyle decides to join the IRA to live up to his Irish heritage. Costello, the "Big Fellah" recruits Michael, wanting to use his apartment in The Bronx as a safe house for an escaped killer. As the play continues, it is clear that someone in their circle is leaking information and can not be trusted.

== Creative Team ==
- Directed by Max Stafford-Clark
- Designed by Tim Shortall
- Lighting by Jason Taylor
- Sound by Nick Manning
