= Twilight: Los Angeles (film) =

- Directed by: Marc Levin
- Written by: Anna Deavere Smith
- Produced by: Cherie Fortis; Daphne Pinkerson; Anna Deavere Smith; Ezra Swerdlow; Steven Tabakin
- Starring: Anna Deavere Smith
- Cinematography: Maryse Alberti; Joan Churchill
- Edited by: Bob Eisenhardt
- Music by: Camara Kambon
- Distributed by: Offline Releasing
- Release date: 2000
- Running time: 76 minutes
- Country: United States
- Language: English

Twilight: Los Angeles is a 2000 American film directed by Marc Levin and starring Anna Deavere Smith.

== Plot ==
In this film adaptation of the Broadway play, Twilight: Los Angeles, 1992, Anna Deavere Smith performs her one-woman show portraying various real life people involved in the aftermath of the 1992 Rodney King trial verdict riots in Los Angeles. The film is interspersed with additional footage shot in 1999 of Smith following up with some of her interviewees.

== Home media ==
PBS Home Video released this film on VHS in 2001. It has never been released on any format ever since.
