= Basil Biggs =

African-American laborer and veterinarian

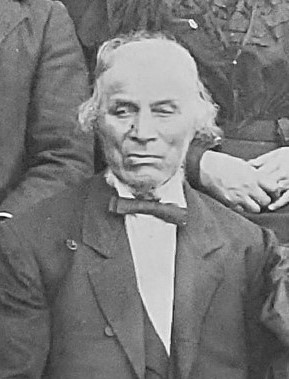
Biggs photographed between 1890 and 1906

Basil Biggs (c. 1819–1906) was a free African-American laborer and veterinarian. He lived near Gettysburg and was reportedly involved with the Underground Railroad.

== Formative years ==
Biggs was born in Carroll County, Maryland, in about 1819. His mother died when he was four years old. During the 1840s, Biggs married Mary Jackson. They had seven children. They moved from Maryland to Gettysburg in 1858.

== Later years ==
Following the Battle of Gettysburg, Biggs was hired to disinter bodies from temporary cemeteries, place them in coffins, and rebury them. The work started in October 1863 and ended in March 1864. He was paid $1.25 per body and worked with a crew of laborers. Gettysburg's Unknown Soldier, Amos Humiston, was among the disinterred.

Biggs used his earnings to purchase a farm in Gettysburg. He started the organization The Sons of Good Will in order to acquire land for black cemeteries.

== Death and interment ==
Biggs died on June 6, 1906, and was interred at the Lincoln Cemetery in Gettysburg.

== Legacy ==
Playwright and actor Anna Deavere Smith is Biggs' great-great-granddaughter. Biggs is the subject of Smith's play Basil Biggs.
