= Samuel Beckett Award =

British literary award

The Samuel Beckett Award was a British award set up in 1983 and, over the next decade, awarded to writers, who in the opinion of a committee of critics, producers and publishers, showed innovation and excellence in writing for the performing arts. The award was established in honour of Irish Nobel Laureate, novelist, playwright and poet Samuel Beckett and in recognition of his distinctive contribution to world theatre and literature.

== Notable winners ==
- Farrukh Dhondy
- Nick Perry
- Karim Alrawi
- Anne Devlin
- Shirley Gee
- Jim Cartwright
- Ronald Frame
- Kevin Elyot
