= Visitors (play) =

Play by Barney Norris

Visitors is a play by the English playwright Barney Norris. It premiered at the Arcola Theatre in London in March 2014, in a production directed by Alice Hamilton, produced by Norris and Hamilton's company Up In Arms. The cast included Linda Bassett, Robin Soans, Eleanor Wyld and Simon Muller.

The play revolves around an elderly couple who live on a farm on Salisbury Plain, and explores their relationships with each other, their son, and a young carer. It received widespread acclaim from theatre critics at the Arcola, on a national tour and following its transfer to the Bush Theatre in winter 2014, and was selected by Henry Hitchings for the Evening Standard and Mark Lawson for The Guardian as one of the best productions of 2014.

'Visitors' were recognised in the industry. Norris received a Critics' Circle Award, and an Offie for Most Promising Playwright. He was nominated for the Writers' Guild of Great Britain Best New Play Award and the Evening Standard Charles Wintour Award for Most Promising Playwright. Bassett received an Offie, and a BritishTheatre.com Award for Best Actress. 'Visitors' spawned 2014 Offie nominations for Best Actor (Robin Soans), Best Director (Alice Hamilton) and Best New Play.
