= Out of Joint Theatre Company =

- Industry: Theatre
- Founded: 1993
- Founder: Max Stafford-Clark; Sonia Friedman
- Defunct: 2025

Out of Joint (1993-2025) was a British and international touring theatre company based in London. It specialised in the commissioning and production of new writing, interspersed with occasional revivals and classic productions.

== History ==
=== Leadership ===
Out of Joint was founded in 1993 by director Max Stafford-Clark and producer Sonia Friedman.

In 1998, Graham Cowley succeeded Friedman as producer in 1998. Upon his retirement in 2012, Cowley was succeeded as producer by Panda Cox, who originally joined the company as Stafford-Clark's assistant.

Martin Derbyshire joined in 2013 and later became Joint CEO and Executive Producer after Stafford-Clark's departure.

In September 2017, Stafford-Clark left the company. In April 2017, he was replaced by then Co-Artistic Director Kate Wasserberg.

=== Activities ===
The company premiered plays by established writers such as David Edgar, Sebastian Barry, Richard Bean, Caryl Churchill, April De Angelis, David Hare, Rebecca Lenkiewicz, Mark Ravenhill and Timberlake Wertenbaker, as well as work from first-time writers such as Stella Feehily and Mark Ravenhill. Classic productions include She Stoops to Conquer, Three Sisters and Macbeth.

The company performed on six continents and has co-produced with theatres such as The National Theatre, Royal Court Theatre, Bush Theatre, Hampstead Theatre and Sydney Theatre Company.

By May 2021, the company had changed its registered address, professional and legal names, becoming known as Stockroom, previously the name of its writers development project. The organisation closed in November 2025.

== Productions ==
Year	Title	Writer	Notes	Ref
1994	The Man of Mode	George Etherege		
1994	The Libertine	Stephen Jeffreys		
1994	The Queen and I	Sue Townsend		
1994	Road	Jim Cartwright		
1995	The Steward of Christendom	Sebastian Barry		
1995	Three Sisters	Anton Chekhov		
1995	The Break of Day	Timberlake Wertenbaker		
1996	Shopping and Fucking	Mark Ravenhill		
1997	Blue Heart	Caryl Churchill		
1998	Our Country's Good	Timberlake Wertenbaker		
1998	Our Lady of Sligo	Sebastian Barry		
1998	The Positive Hour	April De Angelis		
1999	Some Explicit Polaroids	Mark Ravenhill		
1999	Drummers	Simon Bennett		
2000	Rita, Sue and Bob Too	Andrea Dunbar		
2000	A State Affair	Robin Soans		
2001	Sliding with Suzanne	Judy Upton		
2001	Feelgood	Alistair Beaton		
2002	She Stoops to Conquer	Oliver Goldsmith		
2002	A Laughing Matter	April De Angelis		
2002	Hinterland	Sebastian Barry		
2003	Duck	Stella Feehily		
2003	The Permanent Way	David Hare		
2004	Sisters, Such Devoted Sisters	Russell Barr		
2004	Macbeth	William Shakespeare		
2005	Talking to Terrorists	Robin Soans		
2006	The Overwhelming	J. T. Rogers		
2006	O go my Man	Stella Feehily		
2007	Flight Path	David Watson		
2007	King of Hearts	Alistair Beaton		
2008	The Convict's Opera	Stephen Jeffreys		
2008	Testing the Echo	David Edgar		
2009	Mixed Up North	Robin Soans		
2009	Dreams of Violence	Stella Feehily		
2010	The Big Fellah	Richard Bean		
2010	Andersen's English	Sebastian Barry		
2011	Bang Bang Bang	Stella Feehily		
2011	Top Girls	Caryl Churchill		
2011	A Dish of Tea with Dr Johnson		Adapted by Russell Barr, Ian Redford and Max Stafford-Clark from James Boswell's The Life of Samuel Johnson and The Journal of a Tour to the Hebrides.	
2012	Fear Of Music	Barney Norris		
2012	Our Country's Good	Timberlake Wertenbaker		
2013	Ciphers	Dawn King		
2014	This May Hurt A Bit	Stella Feehily		
2014	Pitcairn	Richard Bean		
2015	Crouch, Touch, Pause, Engage	Robin Soans		
2015	Jane Wenham: The Witch of Walkern	Rebecca Lenkiewicz		
2015	All That Fall	Samuel Beckett		
2016	A View from Islington North	Alistair Beaton, Caryl Churchill, Stella Feehily, David Hare and Mark Ravenhill		
2017	Consent	Nina Raine		
2017	Rita, Sue and Bob Too	Andrea Dunbar		
2018	Close Quarters	Kate Bowen		
2019	The Remains of the Day		Based on the novel by Kazuo Ishiguro adapted by Barney Norris	
2020	The Glee Club	Richard Cameron		
2022	Dead Air	Stockroom		
2023	Alice in Wonderland	Stockroom and Vikki Stone		
2023	Blaccine	Stockroom		
2024	Boys from the Blackstuff		Based on the TV show by Alan Bleasdale adapted by James Graham	

== External reference ==
- Out Of Joint website
- British Council Out Of Sight profile
