= The Great Escaper =

2023 biographical drama film by Oliver Parker

- Film poster
- Directed by: Oliver Parker
- Written by: William Ivory
- Produced by: Douglas Rae; Robert Bernstein
- Starring: Michael Caine; Glenda Jackson
- Cinematography: Christopher Ross
- Edited by: Paul Tothill
- Music by: Craig Armstrong
- Production companies: Pathé; BBC Film; Ecosse Films; Film i Väst; Filmgate Films
- Distributed by: Warner Bros. Entertainment UK
- Release dates: 20 September 2023 (BFI Southbank); 6 October 2023 (United Kingdom)
- Running time: 96 minutes
- Countries: United Kingdom; France
- Language: English
- Box office: £3.8 million

The Great Escaper is a 2023 British biographical comedy-drama film directed by Oliver Parker, written by William Ivory, and starring Michael Caine and Glenda Jackson. It is based on the true story of 90-year-old British World War II Royal Navy veteran Bernard Jordan who "broke out" of his nursing home to attend the 70th anniversary D-Day commemorations in France in June 2014.

The Great Escaper had its world premiere in London at BFI Southbank on 20 September 2023, and was released in the United Kingdom on 6 October 2023, by Warner Bros. Pictures. The film marked the final performance for Jackson, who died in June 2023, nine months after filming finished. Caine announced his retirement from acting in October 2023. This is also the last film produced by Pathé UK, after the division announced in November 2023 that they would restructure to focus on premium television and only release films from their parent company.

== Plot ==
Normandy veteran Bernard "Bernie" Jordan and his wife Rene are living together in a retirement home following Rene's health issues. Bernie, who served in the Royal Navy during World War II, initially hopes to attend the 70th anniversary of D-Day. However, he is told that there are no spaces left on any of the group tours to Normandy for the event. Initially hesitant to leave his wife behind due to her health, he is persuaded by Rene herself to find his own way to Normandy to join the commemorations.

Bernie leaves the nursing home early one morning, and takes a taxi to Dover, getting a ticket on a ferry to France. On the ferry, he meets Arthur, an RAF veteran who is on a group tour to Normandy for the commemoration. When Arthur discovers that Bernie is travelling on his own, he invites him to join his group and even to share his hotel room in France. Bernie is reluctant at first but ultimately acquiesces.

Back in the UK, the care home staff are all in a panic over the mysterious disappearance of Bernie, whose whereabouts Rene does not reveal until much later in the day, when she confesses the truth to her nurse, Adele, that he has "escaped". Rene tells Adele that she has been diagnosed with a terminal illness and has only a short time left, and that she has not told Bernie about it because it would only worry him.

Meanwhile, Arthur obtains a ticket for Bernie at the commemorative ceremony, but Bernie gives his and Arthur's ticket away to Heinrich, a German soldier who also fought on D-Day and has come to commemorate the event. Leaving the ceremony behind, Bernie and Arthur head to the Bayeux War Cemetery, where Arthur looks for his brother's grave while Bernie visits the grave of Douglas Bennett, a comrade-in-arms who was killed at the Normandy landing on D-Day after Bernie reassured him that he would be all right. Bernie feels responsible for Douglas' death, because he had persuaded him to leave their ship and face his fate.

When Bernie begins his return journey, he discovers that he has become a celebrity, dubbed "the Great Escaper", and the story of his flight to Normandy has appeared in all the papers. The ferry company staff treat him like royalty and when he gets back home he finds a gaggle of reporters awaiting him. He brushes past them in dismay and goes straight to Rene, to whom he confesses the truth of his guilt over Douglas' death, and his despair at the wasted lives of all the young men who died on that fateful day 70 years ago. Rene assures him that Douglas' death was not his fault, and points out that he and she have lived every second of their lives together and never wasted the time they were given. The next morning, Bernie and Rene get up early to watch the dawn break on the horizon, just as they did some seventy years earlier when they were young lovers.

An epilogue reveals that Bernie died six months after his "great escape" with Rene dying seven days later.

== Cast ==
- Michael Caine as Bernard Jordan, a 90-year-old Second World War veteran who served in the Royal Navy
  - Will Fletcher as young Bernard Jordan
- Glenda Jackson as Irene (Rene) Jordan, Bernard's wife
  - Laura Marcus as young Irene Jordan
- John Standing as Arthur Howard-Johnson
- Jackie Clune as Judith Cook, manager of the care home
- Danielle Vitalis as Adele, a care home worker
- Brennan Reece as Martin Roberts, a care home worker
- Wolf Kahler as Heinrich
- Ian Conningham as LCT Commander Parker
- Elliott Norman as Douglas Bennett
- Donald Sage Mackay as Nathan
- Stephen Leask as Officer Robert
- Carlyss Peer as Officer Vicky
- Victor Oshin as Scott Selwood
- Isabella Domville as Susan Everard

== Production ==
The film was announced in February 2021, and was scheduled to be shot in June of that year. Principal photography commenced the following year, on 8 September 2022, and director Oliver Parker noted that Glenda Jackson "shot almost all her big scenes in the first twelve days". The French street scene was filmed in Church Street, Twickenham. In early October 2022 filming took place in East Sussex, at Camber Sands and Hastings.

The film was shot entirely in the UK, to minimise the travelling involved and the COVID-19 risk to the older cast. John Standing, who appears in the film, claimed it was due to Brexit restrictions, a claim denied by Pathé, one of the film's main production companies. At the time of filming, Caine was 89 and Jackson was 86. They had last made a film together 47 years earlier, The Romantic Englishwoman (1975).

Parker screened the finished film for Caine and Jackson a few weeks before the latter's death on 15 June 2023.

== Reception ==
On the review aggregator website Rotten Tomatoes, 90% of 41 critics' reviews are positive, with an average rating of 7.0/10. The website's consensus reads: "Sweet without straying into sentimentality, The Great Escaper gains added resonance thanks to a pair of stellar performances from Michael Caine and Glenda Jackson." Metacritic, which uses a weighted average, assigned the film a score of 68 out of 100, based on seven critics, indicating "generally favorable" reviews.

Catherine Shoard of The Guardian called the film "brilliant" and "flintier than you might think, and very moving". Peter Bradshaw, also in The Guardian, gave the film 4 stars out of 5, saying "Michael Caine and the late Glenda Jackson bring their A games to this true-life heartwarmer ... their ineffable class give this film some real grit: it's a wonderful last hurrah for Jackson and there is something moving and even awe-inspiring in seeing these two British icons together". Lou Thomas of Empire magazine gave the film 4 stars out of 5, stating "A moving and surprisingly nuanced drama offering far more than flag-waving nostalgia. Superb performances from Michael Caine and Glenda Jackson ensure the latter's final screen role is fittingly dignified". Kevin Maher of The Times also gave the film 4 stars out of 5, saying "Michael Caine and Glenda Jackson are remarkable as a D-Day veteran and his wife in a charming tale".

Clarisse Loughrey of The Independent was less impressed by the film, giving it 2 stars out of 5, commenting on its "pat, patriotic sentimentalism" but that "ultimately, the film finds a way to undercut all that sentimentality until what we're left with is the memory of Caine and Jackson, misty-eyed and full of love". Mark Kermode gave the film a very positive review on his Kermode and Mayo's Take podcast with Simon Mayo, saying "Michael Caine is always watchable, Glenda Jackson has never been [...] anything less than brilliant, and it is one of the most lovely portrayals of a married couple who have been together forever and absolutely adore each other." Tori Brazier of Metro gave the film 4 out of 5, calling it an "unexpectedly complex and unflinching film".

Caine announced his retirement from acting in October 2023 in a BBC Today radio programme interview with Martha Kearney. Referring to The Great Escaper, he said "I keep saying I'm going to retire, well I am now, because I figured, I've had a picture which is, I played the lead and it's got incredible reviews. The only parts I'm liable to get now are old men, 90-year-old men, well, maybe 85, and I thought well I might as well leave with all this. I've got wonderful reviews. What am I going to do to beat this?"
