= The Judy Monologues =

The Judy Monologues is a multimedia one-act play based entirely upon rare voice tapes recorded by Judy Garland in the mid-1960s for her never-written autobiography. It was conceived as a piece of verbatim theatre based on the subject's actual words.

Conceived and directed by Darren Stewart-Jones, the original production featured vintage film clips of Garland from MGM's Till the Clouds Roll By. The Judy Monologues premiered at Buddies in Bad Times Theatre in Toronto, Ontario in September 2010 and subsequently played The Pearl Company in Hamilton, Ontario. Performed by three male actors as a tribute to Garland's influence on the gay community, the original cast featured Philip Cairns, Ryan Fisher and Darren Stewart-Jones. Nigel Gough (1982–2010) was the understudy. A Garland lookalike, Kimberly Roberts, also appeared in silent vignettes.

An abridged version of the play was performed in London, Ontario as part of the London One Act Festival in April, 2011. Philip Cairns won Best Actor at the festival's awards ceremony. The play also received two additional awards - special mentions for the concept and the audio/visual content.

The Judy Monologues was performed at the 2012 Toronto Fringe Festival. Michael Hughes replaced Ryan Fisher in his role.

A revamped version of The Judy Monologues was performed at the 2013 Hamilton Fringe Festival as a one-woman show, with Elley-Ray Hennessy portraying Garland to rave reviews.

The Judy Monologues was performed at the 2015 SpringWorks Festival in Stratford, Ontario, with Elley-Ray Hennessy reprising her role as Garland.

A short film, entitled Judy Garland: Scandalized, was released in 2020. It features the Garland voice tapes that inspired The Judy Monologues. The documentary short focuses mainly on Garland's reaction to the media's presence in her life.
