= Jim Cartwright =

English dramatist (born 1958)

- Born: 27 June 1958 (age 68); Farnworth, Lancashire, England
- Occupation: Playwright
- Writing career
- Notable work: Road (1986)
- Notable awards: George Devine Award; Samuel Beckett Award

Jim Cartwright (born 27 June 1958) is an English dramatist, screenwriter, actor and director. Born in Farnworth, Lancashire. Cartwright's first play, Road, won numerous awards before being adapted for TV and broadcast by the BBC. His work has been translated into more than 40 languages.

== Works ==
=== Plays ===
- Road (1986) – Premiered at the Royal Court Theatre, London. Directed by Simon Curtis. Winner of the George Devine Award, Plays and Players Award, Drama Magazine Award, and the Samuel Beckett Award.
- Bed (1988) - National Theatre, London. Directed by Julia Bardsley.
- Two (1989) - Octagon Theatre, Bolton; later at the Young Vic, London. Directed by Andy Hay. Winner of the Manchester Evening News Award for Best New Play.
- Baths (1990) – Octagon Theatre, Bolton. Directed by Andy Hay.
- Eight Miles High (1991) – Octagon Theatre, Bolton; also staged at Bristol Theatre Royal in 1994 and 1995. Nominated for the Theatre Management Association Best Musical Award. Directed by Andy Hay.
- The Rise and Fall of Little Voice (1992) – Directed by Sam Mendes. Winner of the Evening Standard Award for Best Comedy of the Year and the Laurence Olivier Award for Best Comedy.
- I Licked a Slag’s Deodorant (1996) – The Ambassadors Theatre, West End. Directed by Jim Cartwright.
- Prize Night (1999) – Royal Exchange Theatre, Manchester. Directed by Greg Hersov.
- Hard Fruit (2000) – Royal Court Theatre, London. Directed by James Macdonald.
- A Christmas Fair (2012) – Milton Rooms, Malton. Directed by Nick Bagnal.
- Mobile Phone Show (2013) – National Theatre, London.
- The Ancient Secret of Youth and the Five Tibetans (2015) – Octagon Theatre, Bolton. Directed by David Thacker.
- RAZ (2015) – Premiered at the Edinburgh Festival (winner of Fringe First Award 2015); later at Trafalgar Studios, London, and on nationwide tour.
- Two 2 (2016) – Octagon Theatre, Bolton. Directed by David Thacker.
- Stand Up Stand Up (2017) – Theatre Royal Wakefield; later toured nationally. Directed by Jim Cartwright.
- The Gap (2024) – Hope Mill Theatre, Manchester. Directed by Anthony Banks.

=== Films ===
- Road (1987) – TV adaptation of the play. Directed by Alan Clarke. Winner of the Golden Nymph Award.
- Little Voice (1998) – Film adaptation of Cartwright’s play. Nominated for 19 awards.
- Bed (1995) – BBC production.
- Vroom (1988) – Chosen as Centre Piece at the London Film Festival. Directed by Beeban Kidron.
- Strumpet (2001) – BBC film directed by Danny Boyle.
- Vacuuming Completely Nude in Paradise (2001) – BBC film directed by Danny Boyle.
- Johnny Shakespeare (2008) – BBC1 drama written and directed by Jim Cartwright; won two Royal Television Society Awards.
- King of the Teds (2012) – Sky TV drama directed by Jim Cartwright.

=== Radio ===
- Baths (1987) – BBC Radio 4. Directed by Penny Black.
- Sung (2015) – BBC Radio 4. Directed by Gary Brown.

=== Television ===
- The Hairdresser Mysteries (2026) - Creator.

=== Novels ===
- Supermarket Supermodel (2008) – Published by Random House.
