= Max Stafford-Clark =

British theatre director (born 1941)

- Born: Maxwell Robert Guthrie Stewart Stafford-Clark; 17 March 1941 (age 85); Cambridge, England, United Kingdom
- Occupation: Theatre director

Maxwell Robert Guthrie Stewart "Max" Stafford-Clark (born 17 March 1941) is a British theatre director.

== Early life ==
Stafford-Clark was born in Cambridge, the son of David Stafford-Clark, a physician, and Dorothy Crossley (née Oldfield). He was educated at Felsted School, in Essex, and Riverdale Country School in New York City, followed by Trinity College, Dublin.

== Career ==
His directing career began as Associate Director of the Traverse Theatre, Edinburgh, in 1966. He became artistic director there from 1968 to 1970. He was Director of the Traverse Theatre Workshop Company from 1970 to 1974.

Stafford-Clark then co-founded the Joint Stock Theatre Company in 1974. Joint Stock worked with writers using company research to inspire workshops. From these workshops, writers such as David Hare, Howard Brenton and Caryl Churchill would garner material to inspire a writing phase before rehearsals began. This methodology is sometimes referred to as The Joint Stock Method. Productions during this period included Hare's Fanshen (1975), Brenton's Epsom Downs and Churchill's Cloud Nine (1979) which Stafford-Clark directed, as well as The Speakers, a promenade production.

From 1979 to 1993, Stafford-Clark was Artistic Director of the Royal Court Theatre. He remains to date the Court's longest serving artistic director. He helped nurture emerging playwrights including Andrea Dunbar, Hanif Kureishi, Sarah Daniels and Jim Cartwright. His regular collaborators on his productions included the singer Ian Dury. During this time the theatre's productions included Victory by Howard Barker, The Arbor by Andrea Dunbar, Insignificance by Terry Johnson, Our Country's Good by Timberlake Wertenbaker, Road by Jim Cartwright and Rat in the Skull by Ron Hutchinson. Perhaps the most important commission and production of this era was Top Girls by Caryl Churchill (1982).

Our Country's Good is based on Australian author Thomas Keneally's book The Playmaker in which convicts deported from Britain to the penal colony perform George Farquhar's The Recruiting Officer. Stafford-Clark wrote about his experiences of staging the plays in repertoire in his book Letters to George.

He has staged productions for Happy Days Enniskillen International Beckett Festival.

In 1993, he founded the Out of Joint touring company with producer Sonia Friedman, one of her first ventures after leaving the National Theatre. He was Artistic Director until 2017.

=== Sexual harassment allegations and aftermath ===
In July 2017, an employee of Stafford-Clark's Out of Joint theatre company made a formal complaint about his a tendency to make lewd remarks to women. An investigation followed and he was asked to leave the company. Stafford-Clark stepped down in September 2017. In the weeks that followed, three more women stated that he had "made lewd comments to them." going back several decades. The actress Tracy-Ann Oberman was among those who contacted The Guardian to relate their experience, taking the number of women who had made complaints about Stafford-Clark to five.

He was succeeded by Kate Wasserberg, the company's then Co-Artistic Director. By May 2021, the company had changed its registered address, professional and legal names. It became known as Stockroom, presumably as a reference to Stafford-Clark's work in co-founding and leading his first company (Joint Stock). The name Out of Joint had cleverly used a famous three word phrase in Shakespeare's Hamlet to simultaneously describe the evolutionary legacy from Stafford-Clark's first company.

=== Academic credits ===
Academic credits include an honorary doctorate from Oxford Brookes University and Professorships at the University of Warwick and the University of Hertfordshire.

=== Papers ===
In 1999 the British Library acquired Stafford-Clark's papers consisting of production diaries and rehearsal scripts covering his time with the Joint Stock Theatre Company, the English Stage Company at the Royal Court Theatre, and Out of Joint theatre company. The Library also acquired supplementary production diaries and rehearsal scripts in 2005.

== Personal life ==
Stafford-Clark and Carole Hayman married in 1971; they later divorced. His second wife was Ann Pennington (m. 1981).

During a six-month period in 2006 and 2007, Stafford-Clark suffered three strokes, which left him physically disabled and impaired his eyesight. Stafford-Clark's experience, and the condition of the NHS, inspired Irish playwright Stella Feehily (the couple married in 2010) to write the play This May Hurt a Bit, first performed in 2014.

== Productions since 2000 ==
- 2000 A State Affair by Robin Soans (Out of Joint/Soho Theatre)
- 2000 Rita, Sue and Bob Too by Andrea Dunbar (Out of Joint/Soho Theatre)
- 2001 Feelgood by Alistair Beaton (Out of Joint, Hampstead Theatre and the Garrick Theatre)
- 2001 Sliding with Suzanne by Judy Upton (Out of Joint/The Royal Court)
- 2002 Hinterland by Sebastian Barry (Out of Joint/The National Theatre)
- 2002 A Laughing Matter by April De Angelis (Out of Joint/The National Theatre)
- 2002 She Stoops to Conquer by Oliver Goldsmith (Out of Joint/The National Theatre)
- 2003 The Breath of Life by David Hare (Sydney Theatre Company)
- 2003 Duck by Stella Feehily (Out of Joint/Royal Court)
- 2003 The Permanent Way by David Hare (Out of Joint/The National Theatre)
- 2004 Macbeth by William Shakespeare (Out of Joint)
- 2005 Talking to Terrorists by Robin Soans (Out of Joint/Royal Court)
- 2006 O Go My Man by Stella Feehily
- 2006 The Overwhelming by JT Rogers (Out of Joint/The National Theatre)
- 2007 King of Hearts by Alistair Beaton (Out of Joint, Hampstead Theatre)
- 2008 The Convicts Opera - Stephen Jeffreys - Based On The Beggars Opera
- 2009 Dreams of Violence by Stella Feehily - (Out of Joint/Soho Theatre)
- 2009 Mixed Up North by Robin Soans - (Out of Joint/Octagon Theatre Bolton)
- 2010 Andersen's English by Sebastian Barry (Out of Joint/Hampstead Theatre
- 2010 The Big Fellah by Richard Bean (Out of Joint/Lyric Hammersmith)
- 2011 A Dish of Tea with Dr Johnson adapted by Russell Barr, Ian Redford & Max Stafford-Clark from James Boswell.
- 2011 Bang Bang Bang by Stella Feehily - (Out of Joint/Royal Court Theatre/ Octagon Theatre Bolton/ Salisbury Playhouse/ Leicester Curve)
- 2011 Top Girls by Caryl Churchill - (Out of Joint, Chichester Festival Theatre)
- 2012 Our Country's Good by Timberlake Wertenbaker - (Out of Joint)
- 2014 This May Hurt A Bit by Stella Feehily
- 2014 Pitcairn by Richard Bean
- 2015 Crouch, Touch, Pause, Engage by Robin Soans

== Bibliography ==
- Ritchie, R. (1987), The Joint Stock Book, London: Methuen ISBN 0-413-41030-7
- Stafford-Clark, M. (1997), Letters to George: The Account of a Rehearsal, London: Nick Hern Books ISBN 1-85459-317-X
- Stafford-Clark, M. and Roberts, P. (2007), Taking Stock: The Theatre of Max Stafford-Clark, London: Nick Hern Books ISBN 1-85459-840-6
- Stafford-Clark, M. with McKeown, M. (2010), Our Country's Good: Page to Stage, London: Nick Hern Books ISBN 978-1-84842-043-4
- Stafford-Clark, M. (2014), Journal of the Plague Year, London: Nick Hern Books ISBN 9781848421790
