= Robin Soans =

British actor (born 1946)

- Born: Robin Michael Hardwick Soans; 20 June 1946 (age 80); Northamptonshire, England
- Occupation: Actor

Robin Soans (born 20 June 1946) is a British actor and playwright specialising in verbatim and documentary plays. These plays include Across the Divide (2007); A State Affair (2000) which looked at life on a Bradford estate, produced by Out of Joint Theatre Company; The Arab Israeli Cookbook (Gate Theatre 2004); Talking to Terrorists (Out of Joint theatre company and Royal Court Theatre); Life After Scandal (Hampstead Theatre); and Crouch, Touch, Pause, Engage (Out of Joint theatre company, National Theatre Wales, Arcola Theatre, and Sherman Cymru). Other plays include Bet Noir (Young Vic 1986); Sinners and Saints (The Croydon Warehouse) and Will and Testament (The Oval House).

He wrote Mixed Up North for LAMDA theatre school in 2008, about a youth theatre group created as a means to unite divided racial communities in the Lancashire mill town of Burnley; in 2009 it was performed professionally in a co-production between Out of Joint theatre company and Bolton Octagon Theatre.

As an actor, he has appeared at the National Theatre, the Royal Court Theatre, the Royal Shakespeare Company and Shakespeare's Globe. He also starred in Bill Douglas's epic film of the Tolpuddle Martyrs, Comrades.

In 2014 he appeared as Arthur in Barney Norris' play Visitors at the Arcola Theatre.

In 2015 his verbatim play Crouch, Touch, Pause, Engage, about the rugby player Gareth Thomas and young people in Bridgend, toured Britain and was staged at the Arcola.

In 2004, Soans compiled The Arab-Israeli Cookbook- The Recipes.
