= Index of drinking establishment–related articles =

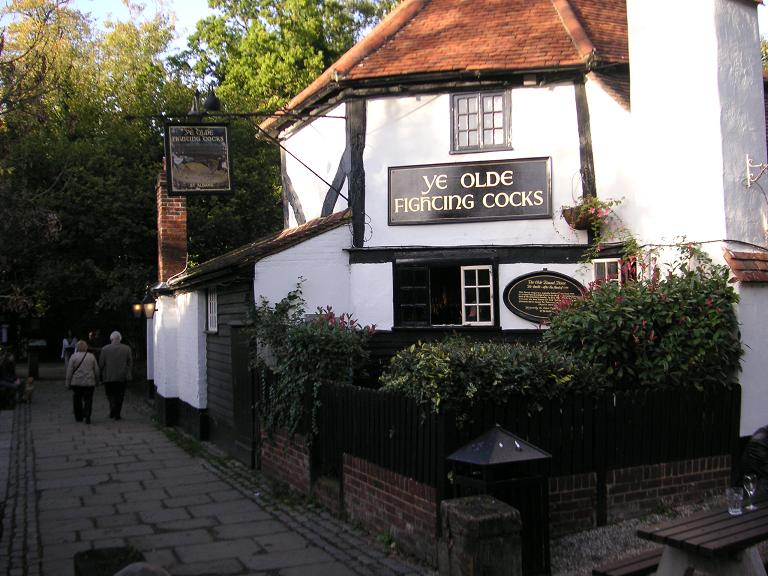
Ye Olde Fighting Cocks in St Albans, Hertfordshire, holds the Guinness World Record for the oldest pub in England.

This is an index of drinking establishment-related articles.

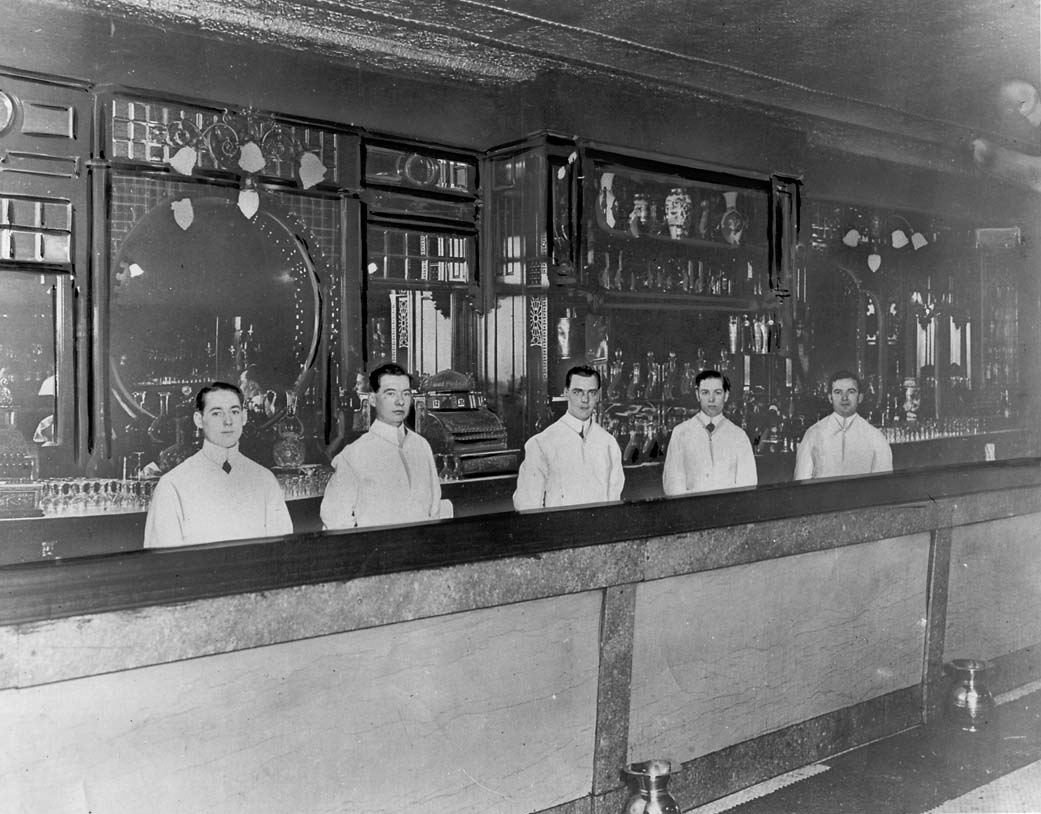
Bartenders at the St. Charles Hotel in Toronto, c. 1911

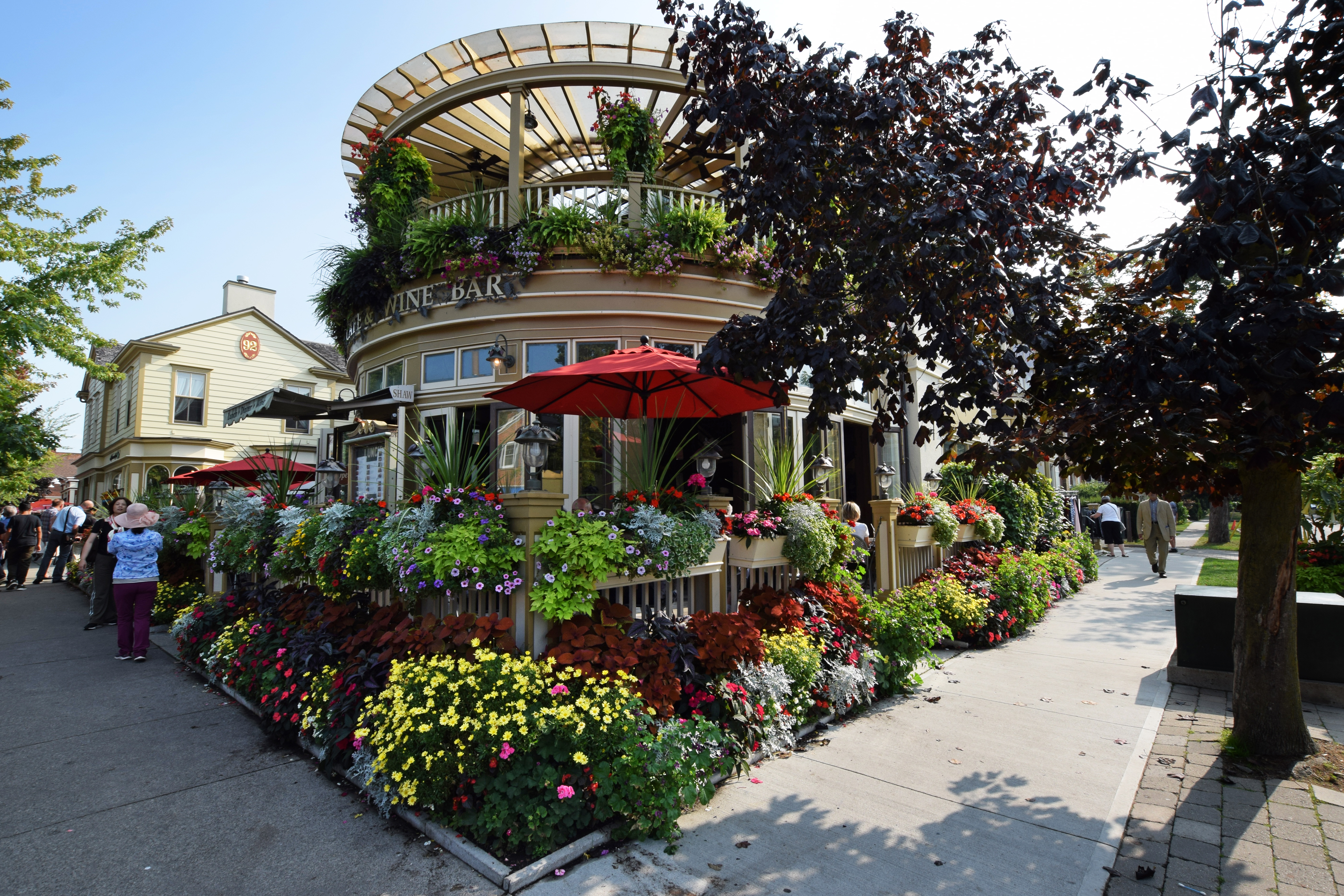
A café and wine bar in Ontario, Canada

== Types of drinking establishment ==
- Alcohol-free bar
- Australian pub
- Bar
- Beer hall
- Biker bar
- Bloodhouse
- Botequim
- Brewpub
- Cantina
- Cider house
- Cigar bar
- Dance bar
- Desi pub
- Dive bar
- Drinking establishment
- Fern bar
- Gastropub
- Gay bar
- Gothenburg Public House System
- Honky-tonk
- Hookah lounge
- Host and hostess clubs
- Ice bar
- Inn
- Irish pub
- Izakaya
- Juke joint
- Lesbian bar
- Micropub
- Nightclub
- Pub
- Ratskeller
- Roadhouse
- Shebeen
- Sly-grog shop
- Speakeasy
- Tavern
- Tied house
- Tiki bar
- Western saloon

== Lists of pubs ==
- List of award-winning pubs in London
- List of fictional bars and pubs
- List of former public houses and coffeehouses in Boston
- List of pubs in Australia
- List of pubs in Dublin
- List of pubs in London
- List of pubs in the United Kingdom
- List of pubs named Carpenter Arms
- List of real London pubs in literature
- Pubs and inns in Grantham

== Bar terminology ==
- Bar-back
- Bartender
- Bartending terminology
- Beer engine
- Beer garden
- Cocktail waitress
- Flair bartending
- Happy hour
- Ladies' night
- Last call

== Other ==
=== A ===
- Act of Parliament clock
- Alcohol licensing laws of the United Kingdom
- Anti-Saloon League

=== B ===
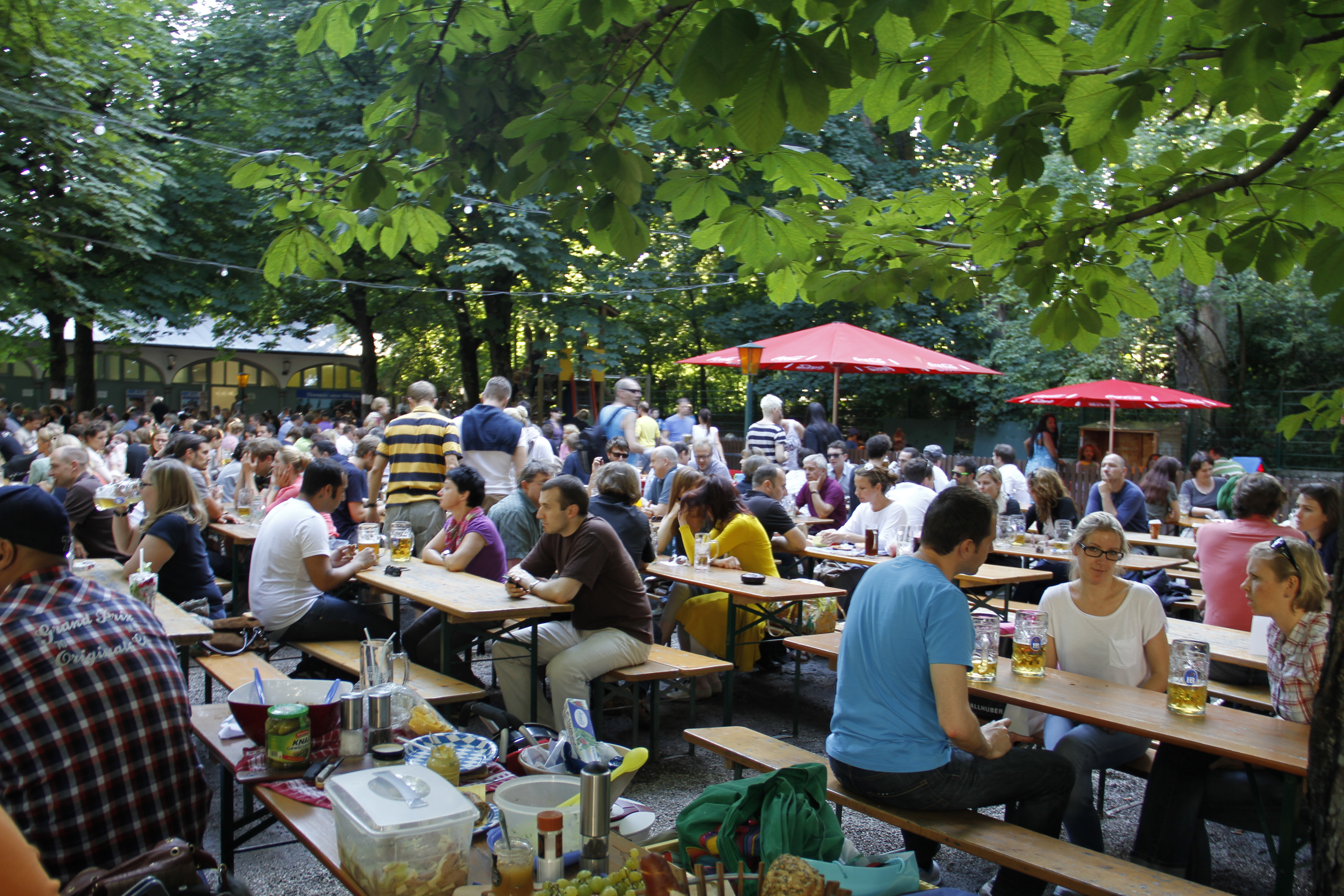
A beer garden in Munich, Germany

- Beerhouse Act 1830
- Birmingham pub bombings

=== C ===
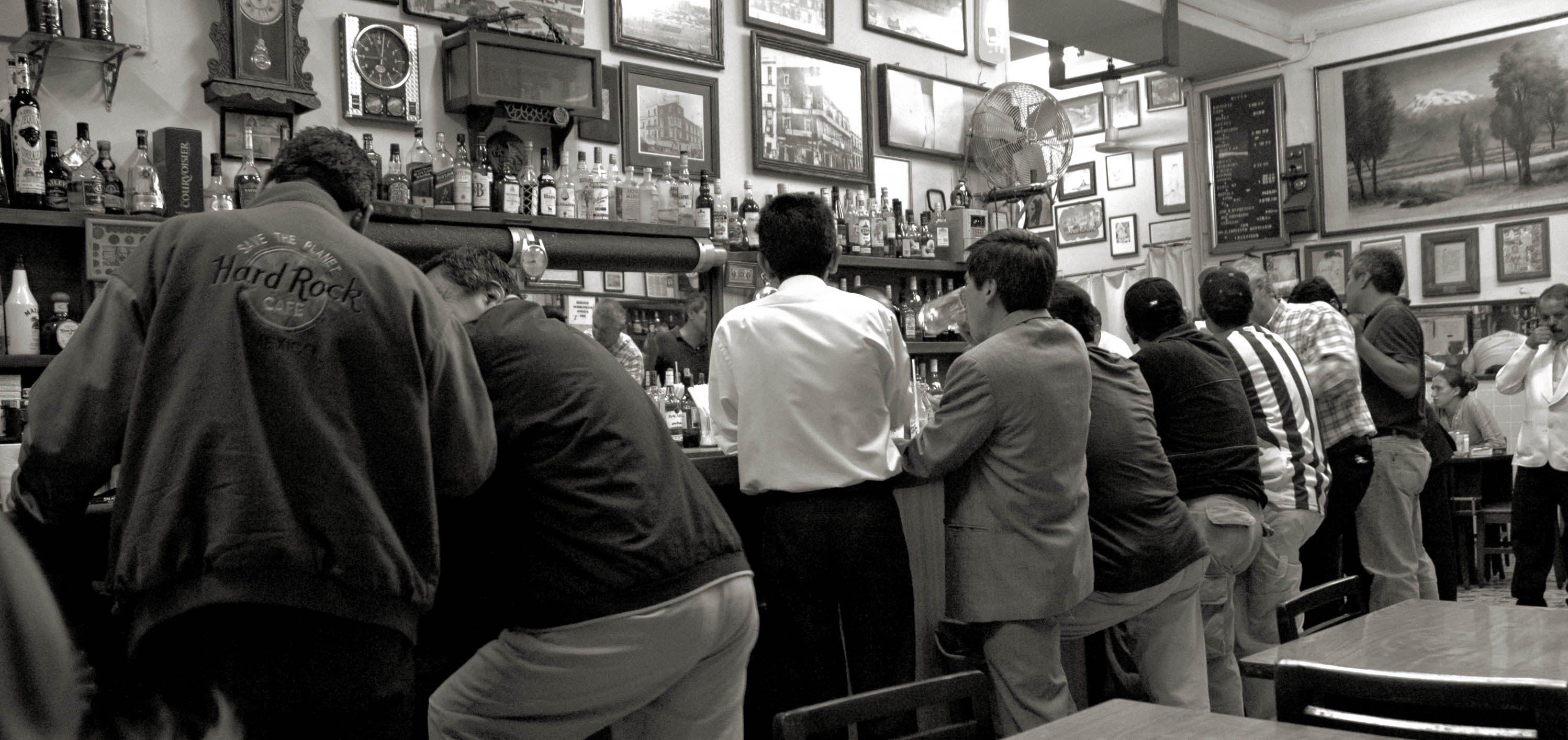
Customers at a cantina

- Campaign for Real Ale
- Cheers (sitcom)
- Classic cocktail

=== E ===
- Eire Pub, Dorchester, Massachusetts, visited by presidents and prime ministers and political candidates

=== G ===
- The Good Pub Guide
- Guildford pub bombings

=== I ===
- Ice luge

=== J ===
- J D Wetherspoon

=== K ===
- King Street Run

=== L ===
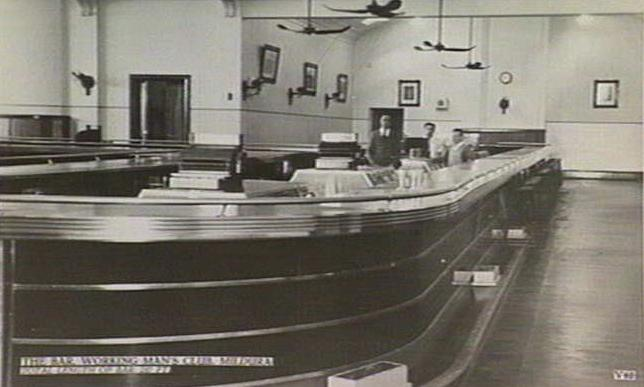
The Mildura Working Man's Club in 1945, bar length 91 metres (299 ft). It has been considered one of the longest bars in Australia.

- Licensing Act 1904
- List of bars
- List of microbreweries
- Longest bar in Australia

=== M ===
- Microbrewery

=== N ===
- National Pub of the Year

=== P ===
- Pub chain
- Pub church
- Pub crawl
- Pub Design Awards
- Pub games
- Pub Golf
- Pub names
- Pub Philosophy

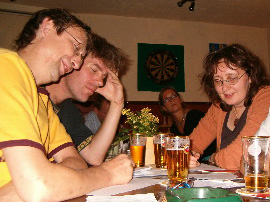
A pub quiz team in Amsterdam

- Pub quiz
- Pub rock (Australia)
- Pub rock (United Kingdom)
- Pub song
- Pub token
- Public houses of Montevideo
- Punch Taverns

=== R ===
- Rail Ale Ramble

=== S ===
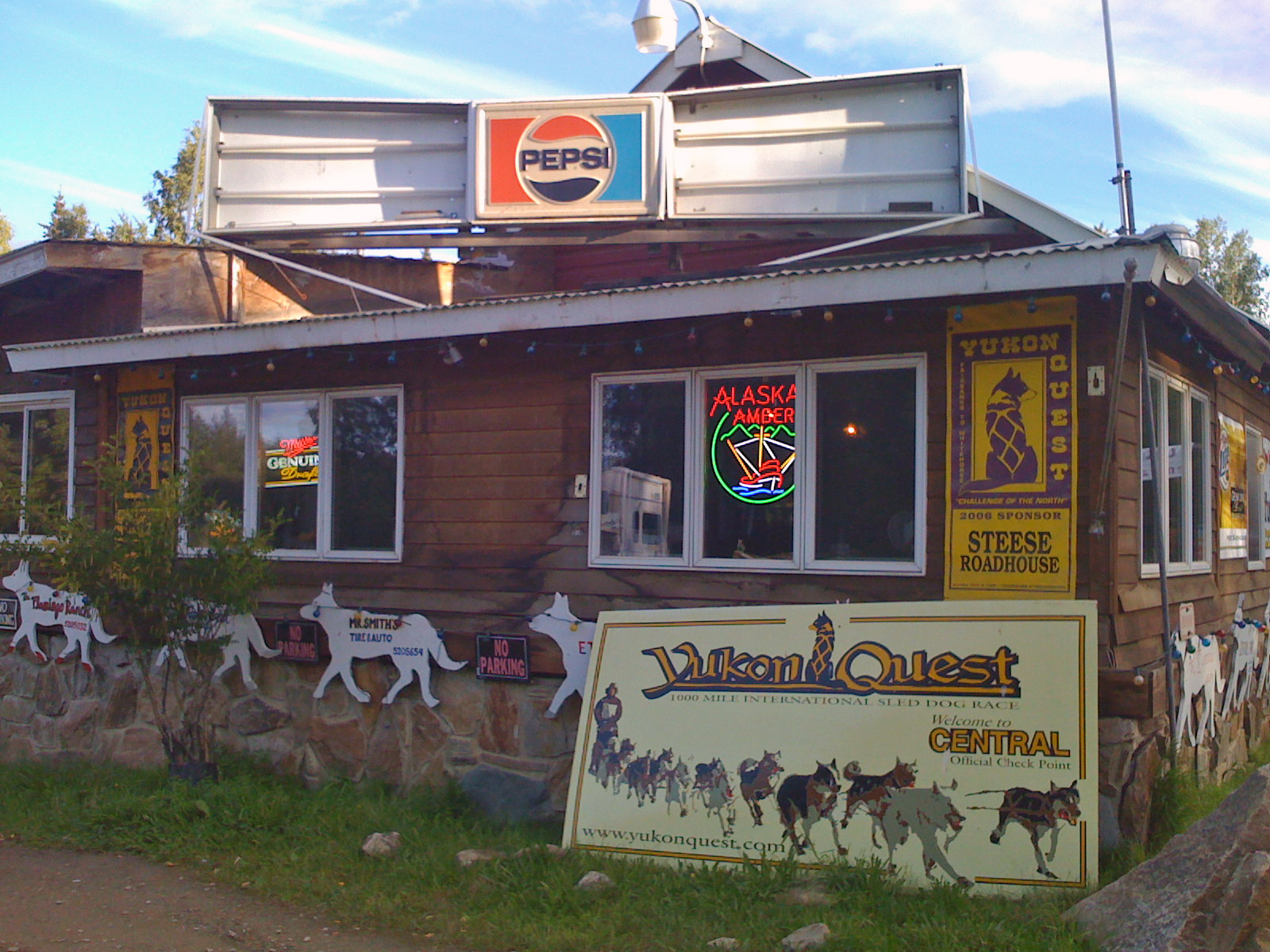
Steese Roadhouse in Central, Alaska, is the sole bar, general store, and gas station in Central.

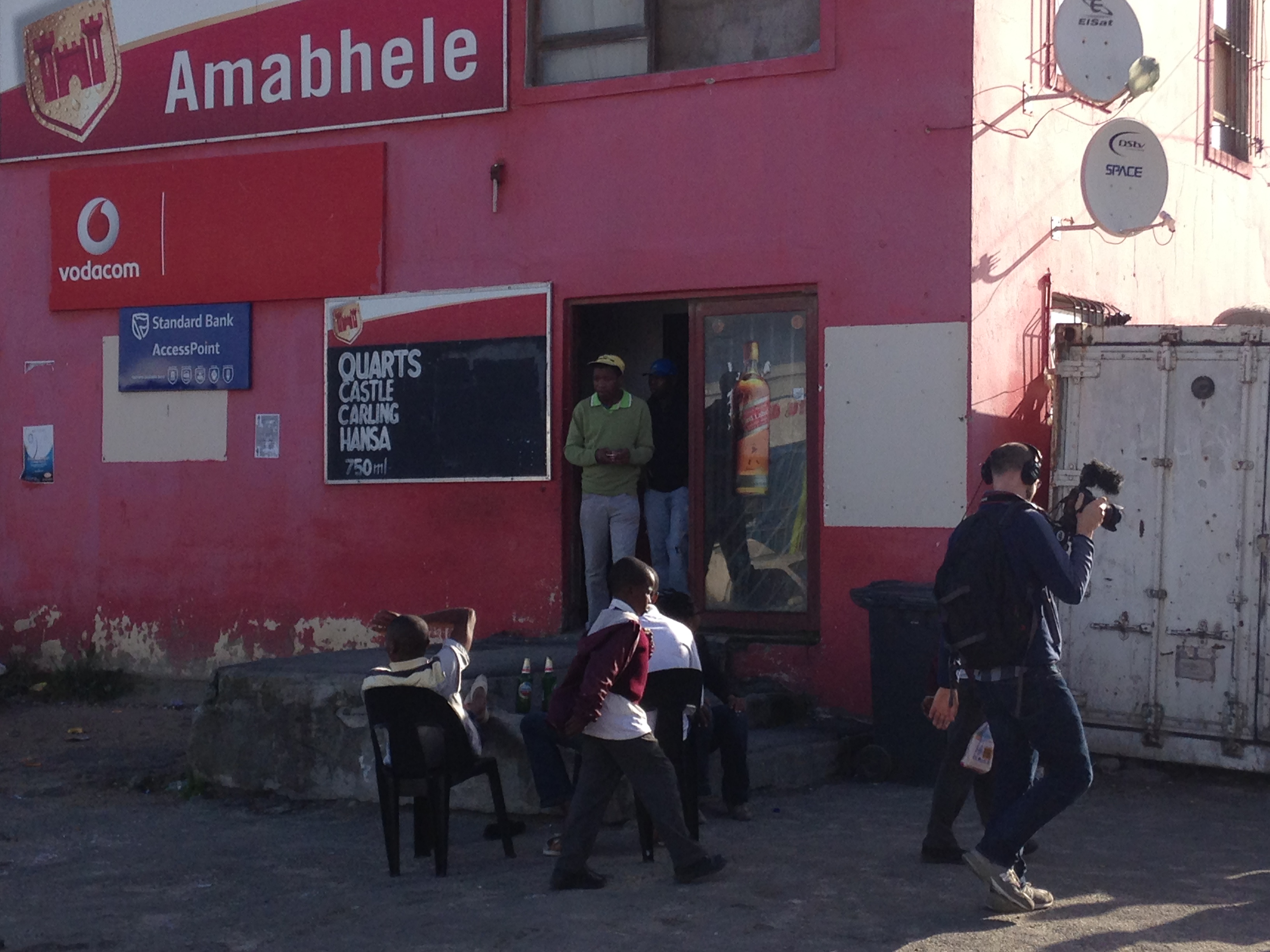
A shebeen in Joe Slovo Park, Cape Town

- SantaCon
- Six o'clock swill
- Skeptics in the Pub
- Stonegate Pub Company

=== W ===
- World of Pub (sitcom)
- The World's End (film)

=== Z ===
- Zombie Pub Crawl
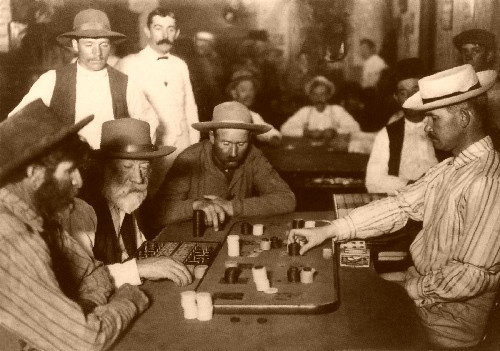
Men in an Arizona saloon in 1895 playing a game of faro

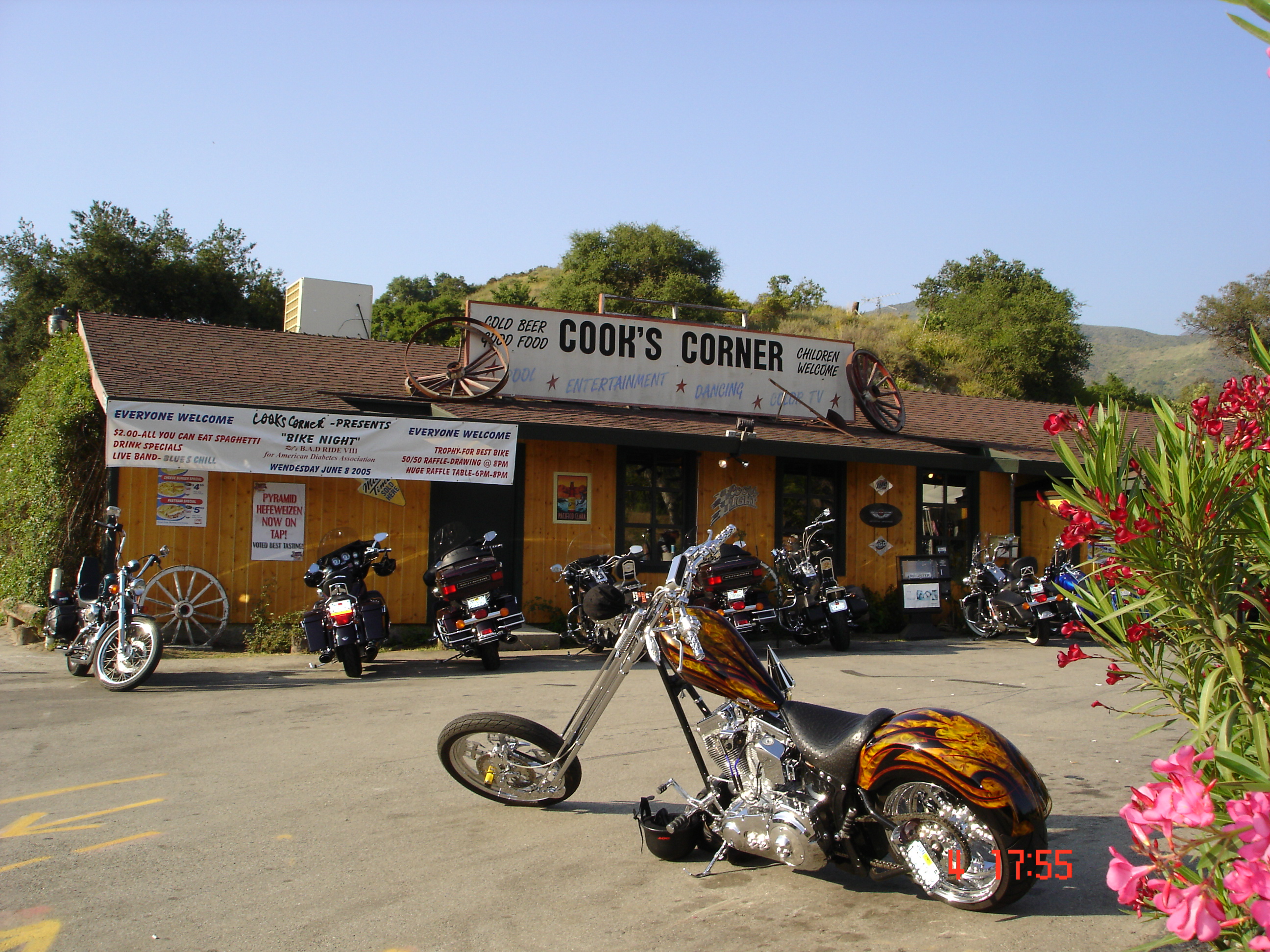
Cook's Corner, a biker bar, c. 2005

== See also ==
- Alcoholic beverage
- Beer and breweries by region
- Cocktail
- Drinking culture
- Drinking game
- List of alcoholic beverages
- List of bartenders
- List of cocktails
- List of drinking games
- Mixed drinks
