= Exchange Coffee House =

Exchange Coffee House may refer to:

- Exchange Coffee House, Boston, an early 19th-century hotel and coffeehouse
- Exchange Coffee House, Montreal, an early 19th-century hotel and stock trading place

== See also ==
- Coffeehouse#Europe, for an overview of coffeehouses as social and business centers
- Jonathan's Coffee-House, a London coffeehouse and the original home of the London Stock Exchange
- List of former public houses and coffeehouses in Boston
