= List of real London pubs in literature =

This is a list of real-life London pubs that are depicted in works of fiction. Pubs play a prominent role in British culture, with their portrayal in literature dating back at least as far as the time of Chaucer, and London's rich history of being used as a setting for literary works means this has continued into the 21st century.

The list is divided into pubs that appear under their real names and pubs that are either portrayed using close pseudonyms or whose description or location have led to speculation as to which establishments they were based on.

== Pubs depicted under their real names ==
Image	Name	Appears In	Notes
	Black Lion, Kilburn	The Hard Shoulder (2001), Chris Petit	O’Grady, the book’s protagonist, goes in shortly after being released from prison: 'He had favoured the Black Lion after being barred from the Roman Way for brawling' (p4).
	The Blind Beggar, Whitechapel	White Chappell, Scarlet Tracings (1987), Iain Sinclair	Briefly visited by the narrator and his companion whilst on a trip searching out rare books: ‘Across the generous boulevard, Whitechapel Road, and into the Blind Beggar; stopped down, thirsty. We are looked over and ignored.’ (Ch. 15)
	Boar's Head Inn, Eastcheap	Henry IV, Part 1 (c.1597), William Shakespeare	The meeting place of Sir John Falstaff and Prince Hal. Whilst this was a real pub when Shakespeare wrote the play there is no evidence it existed at the time the play is set. Original destroyed in the Great Fire of London and picture depicts the rebuilt site.
	The Brewery Tap, Commercial Road	London Blues (1997), Anthony Frewin	Visited by the narrator whilst on the way to meet a mysterious contact whom he later discovers murdered: ‘At the top of the road on the left there’s a quaint little pub that must be as old as Caroline Street itself. It’s a Victorian local called the Brewery Tap. It doesn’t look much bigger than my room.’ (Ch. 7). Closed in 2012 and converted into apartments; adjacent to the Troxy music venue.
	The Bunch of Grapes, Southwark	White Chappell, Scarlet Tracings (1987), Iain Sinclair	The narrator and his companions pass the pub as a group of young doctors, ‘with that exuberance whose post-textual charm does not translate onto the street, shove into The Bunch of Grapes, to drink themselves steady for an afternoon in the cutting-rooms.’ (Ch. 7)
	The Carpenters Arms, Bethnal Green	White Chappell, Scarlet Tracings (1987), Iain Sinclair	The mysterious book dealer Dryfeld locks his bike nearby: ‘Dryfeld padlocked his wheels, winding a heavily-guaranteed chain in and out of the spokes, round the crossbar, over the rail that fronted a strip of wasteground to the side of the Carpenters Arms.’ (Ch. 4)
	The Chatterton Arms, Bromley	The Buddha of Suburbia (1990), Hanif Kureishi	Visited by Karim, the narrator, who reports: 'In the pub, the Chatterton Arms, sat ageing Teddy Boys in drape coats'.
	Chelsea Potter, Chelsea	London Blues (1997), Anthony Frewin	The narrator and his girlfriend visit whilst feeling gloomy about the ongoing Cuban Missile Crisis: ‘Veronica and I went down to the Chelsea Potter pub on the Saturday evening to escape the gloom.’ (Ch. 5)
	The Chesham Arms, Hackney	Downriver (1991), Iain Sinclair	The narrator arranges to meet Fredrik, a writer, in there to discuss making a film about the River Thames: 'We arranged to meet for a drink in the Chesham Arms, Mehetabel Road, Hackney', (p64).
	The Cock and Pye, Drury Lane	Hawksmoor (1985), Peter Ackroyd	Architect Nicholas Dyer (based on Nicholas Hawksmoor) visits a series of pubs with his colleague: ‘Then we walk’d on to the Cock and Pye in Drury Lane, where a second and third Bottle succeeded on the Table’ (p184). Originally the Cock and Pye, it had been renamed the Cock and Magpie by the 1870s.
	The Cock Tavern, Fleet Street	Orlando (1928), Virginia Woolf	Originally located at no. 190, the pub is mentioned when Orlando relates drunkenly meeting a number of 16th century literary figures there: ‘He could remember he said, a night at the Cock Tavern in Fleet Street when Kit Marlowe was there and some others.’ (Ch. 2) The original building was demolished in 1887 and rebuilt at no. 22 as Ye Olde Cock Tavern (pictured).
	Coach and Horses, Isleworth	Oliver Twist (1837–39), Charles Dickens	Visited by Bill Sikes and Oliver on their way to a burglary in Shepperton. ‘At length they came to a public-house called the Coach and Horses, a little way beyond which another road appeared to turn off,' (p136).
	Coach and Horses, Soho	Jeffrey Bernard is Unwell (1989), Keith Waterhouse	The play is set inside the pub as a result of the protagonist, Jeffrey Bernard, having been locked in overnight.
The Dove	The Dove, Hammersmith	Under the Net (1954), Iris Murdoch	Visited by the protagonist, Jake Donaghue, in order to meet a theatrical acquaintance. 'The address I had been given was on that part of the Mall that lies between the Dove and the Black Lion', (p38). Also appears pseudonymously in The Water Gipsies; see below.
	The Flask, Hampstead	Clarissa (1748), Samuel Richardson	At the time the pub was known as the Lower Flask in order to distinguish it from the nearby Upper Flask, both of which are mentioned in volume 5 of the book: 'I have got the fellow down!—I have got old Grimes—hah, hah, hah, hah!—He is at the Lower Flask’ (Vol. 5, Letter 25) and ‘The coach carried us to Hampstead, to Highgate, to Muswell-hill; back to Hampstead to the Upper-Flask: there, in compliment to the nymphs, my beloved consented to alight, and take a little repast. Then home early by Kentish-town.’ (Vol. 5, Letter 1)
	The Fortune of War, Smithfield	Vanity Fair (1848), William Makepeace Thackeray	Appears in chapter 37: ‘The bill for servants' porter at the Fortune of War public house is a curiosity in the chronicles of beer.’ Allegedly the site where the Great Fire of London stopped, the pub was demolished in 1910 but the Golden Boy of Pye Corner, built to commemorate the fire, remains at the site where the pub was situated.
	The George Inn, Southwark	Little Dorrit (1857), Charles Dickens	The place where Tip Dorrit writes a letter to Arthur Clennam: ‘“I’ll have a Try too,” and if he goes into the George and writes a letter and if he gives it me and says, “Take that one to the same place, and if the answer’s a good ‘un I’ll give you a shilling,” it ain’t my fault, mother!’’ (Ch. 22)
	George and Vulture, City of London	The Pickwick Papers (1837), Charles Dickens	Visited by Mr Pickwick and Sam during the book: ‘Mr Pickwick and his friends returned to London; and the former gentleman, attended of course by Sam, straightway repaired to his old quarters at the George and Vulture.’ Dickens himself was also a regular.
	The Green Man, Fitzrovia	20,000 Streets Under the Sky (1929-1934), Patrick Hamilton	Bob, the central character in The Midnight Bell, the first part of the trilogy, arranges to meet Jenny, a local prostitute, there: ‘They arranged to meet at three fifteen outside ‘The Green Man,’ opposite Great Portland Street Station. That would be most convenient for him, and she could easily get up there in time’, (p94). Name was changed to ‘Greene’ Man following its acquisition by the Greene King brewery group.
	The Heaton Arms, Peckham	The Ballad of Peckham Rye (1960), Muriel Spark	Visited by Humphrey Page as part of his pub crawl in the opening chapter; see entry for The Rye Hotel for full details. Since demolished and turned into flats.
	Jack Straw's Castle, Hampstead	Dracula (1897), Bram Stoker	Visited by Van Helsing and Dr Seward prior to them commencing a midnight vigil in a nearby cemetery, with Seward noting in his diary: ‘We dined at ‘Jack Straw’s Castle’ along with a little crowd of bicyclists and others who were genially noisy’. Largely re-built following bomb damage in World War II. Closed in 2002 and converted into flats and a gym.
	The Jeremy Bentham, Bloomsbury	Saturday (2005), Ian McEwan	Henry Perowne, the protagonist, enters the pub in order to avoid being attacked on a day of London protests: ‘Just up the street is a pub, the Jeremy Bentham. But if it’s open this early, the drinkers are all inside in the warmth.’ Closed c.2017 and reopened as Simmons, though the auto-icon of Jeremy Bentham remains outside.
	The King's Head and Eight Bells, Chelsea	The George Smiley novels, (1961-2017), John le Carré	The regular pub of le Carré's spy character, it was also frequented by Ian Fleming. Later the Cheyne Walk Brasserie (pictured), as of Feb 2021 called No. Fifty Cheyne.
	The Macbeth, Hoxton	Memphis Underground (2007), Stewart Home	The narrator goes in with his companion, Captain Swanky: ‘Hell too is murky and the decor in the Macbeth was something else, being evenly split between neo-classical and rococo.’ (p63)
	Mermaid Tavern, Cheapside	Inviting a Friend to Supper (1616), Ben Jonson and Lines on the Mermaid Tavern (1819), John Keats	Jonson’s poem features the lines ‘But that which most doth take my Muse and me / Is a pure cup of rich Canary wine / Which is the Mermaid’s now, but shall be mine’ whilst Keats’ includes: ‘What Elysium have ye known / Happy field or mossy cavern / Choicer than the Mermaid Tavern?’ Destroyed in the Great Fire of London.
	The Mitre, Cheapside	Every Man out of His Humour (1599), Ben Jonson and Westward Ho (c.1604), Thomas Dekker and John Webster	Both works include a reference to George the drawer: ‘Where’s George? call me George hither quickly’ in the former and ‘O, you are George the drawer at the Mitre’ in the latter. Also spelt ‘Miter’, ‘Myter’ or ‘The Myter in Cheape’. Destroyed in the Great Fire of London. Believed to have been located at 18 Cheapside at the junction of Friday Street and Bread Street.
	Molly Moggs, Soho	Adrift in Soho (1961), Colin Wilson	Harry Preston, the main character, visits the pub not long after moving to London in an attempt to become a writer.
	The Morning Star, Peckham	The Ballad of Peckham Rye (1960), Muriel Spark	Visited by Humphrey Page as part of his pub crawl in the opening chapter; see entry for The Rye Hotel for full details. Name has since been changed to the Nag’s Head.
	Ye Olde Cheshire Cheese, Fleet Street	The Dynamiter (1885), Robert Louis Stevenson and Fanny Stevenson, The Million Dollar Bond Robbery (1923), Agatha Christie, The Mystery of 31 New Inn (1912), R. Austin Freeman and Ralph the Heir (1871), Anthony Trollope	Appears at the beginning of The Dynamiter in the Prologue of the Cigar Divan: ‘A select society at the Cheshire Cheese engaged my evenings; my afternoons, as Mr. Godall could testify, have been generally passed in this divan’. In The Million Dollar Bond Robbery a new client suggests to Hercule Poirot and Captain Hastings that they accompany her there in order to meet her fiancé as part of their enquiries into missing bonds: ‘I was about to suggest that you should lunch with me at the “Cheshire Cheese”.’ In The Mystery of 31 New Inn Dr. Thorndyke explains he has arranged to meet his solicitor there: "He called this morning to ask me to lunch with him and a new client at the 'Cheshire Cheese.' I accepted and notified him that I should bring you." (Ch. 5) In Ralph the Heir it is where Ontario Moggs addresses a debating club: ‘Mr. Ontario Moggs was the orator, and he was at this moment addressing a crowd of sympathising friends in the large front parlour of the Cheshire Cheese.’ (Ch. 16).
	The Old Horns, Bethnal Green	Downriver (1991), Iain Sinclair	The narrator meets a director, Saul Nickoll, who is to film his script, and who is a regular at the pub: ‘He modelled blue Crombie overcoats, left behind, in something of a hurry, at the Old Horns (Bethnal Green),’ (p347). Later renamed the Jeremiah Bullfrog, closed in 1997 and, as of March 2021, a Montessori School.
	Peacock Inn, Islington	Nicholas Nickleby (1839), Charles Dickens and Tom Brown's School Days (1857), Thomas Hughes	In Nicholas Nickleby the protagonist suffers an uncomfortable coach journey to the inn as he travels to Yorkshire: ‘Between the manual exertion and the mental anxiety attendant upon this task, he was not a little relieved when the coach stopped at the Peacock at Islington.’ (Ch. 5) In Tom Brown’s Schooldays Tom and his father stay there prior to him travelling to the Midlands to start at his new school: ‘Tally-ho coach for Leicester'll be round in half an hour, and don't wait for nobody.” So spake the boots of the Peacock Inn Islington, at half-past two o'clock on the morning of a day in the early part of November 183-, giving Tom at the same time a shake by the shoulder,’ (Ch. 4) The pub closed in 1962, though the building still stands.
	Pillars of Hercules, Soho	Under the Net (1954), Iris Murdoch and London Blues (1997), Anthony Frewin	In Under the Net the protagonist, Jake Donaghue, walks through Soho, noting: 'by the time I had worked my way along Brewer Street and Old Compton Street and up Greek Street as far as the Pillars of Hercules most of the money in my pocket had been taken away by various acquaintances', (p36). In London Blues it is visited by Timmy, the central character: ‘Afterwards we wandered lazily about the West End and had a couple of drinks in the Pillars of Hercules’ (Ch. 8)
	The Prince of Wales, Maida Vale	The Lonely Londoners (1956), Samuel Selvon	Tanty Bessy asks a policeman standing outside a pub for directions on how to reach Great Portland Street: ‘though she see plenty people that she could ask she ignore them and look for a policeman. She didn’t see one till she reach by the Prince of Wales.’ (p139 - eBook edition). Closed in 2014 following the landlord’s conviction for sexual assault and following the rejection of an application to turn it into a betting shop it is now a branch of Costa Coffee.
	Prospect of Whitby, Wapping	The League of Extraordinary Gentlemen, Volume One (2000), Alan Moore and Kevin O'Neill	Mina Murray passes the pub and says that it brings back memories, presumably a reference to her experiences with Dracula, who entered Britain via Whitby.
	The Roman Way, Kilburn	The Hard Shoulder (2001), Chris Petit	O’Grady, the book’s protagonist, decides against visiting the pub shortly after being released from prison: 'He had favoured the Black Lion after being barred from the Roman Way for brawling', p4. Closed c.2003 and as of Feb 2021 a branch of Nando’s.
	The Royal Oak, Bayswater	London Blues (1997), Anthony Frewin	The narrator of the opening chapter reports: ‘I turn left on to Porchester Road and stop. I’m standing outside the Royal Oak pub, a place that looks like it must have been here for a hundred years or more.’ (Ch.1) Dates back to at least the 18th century; since rebuilt, and now known as the Porchester. Fittingly, the narrator adds that it ‘probably hasn’t changed since the war and one that won’t until the day a developer gets planning permission to demolish and redevelop it, then it’ll become part of what it already seems – another part of Lost London.’
	The Rye Hotel, Peckham	The Ballad of Peckham Rye (1960), Muriel Spark	The opening chapter follows Humphrey Page shortly after he abandons his fiancée at the altar and embarks upon a pub crawl that sees him drive ‘along the Grove and up to the Common where he parked outside the Rye Hotel’, then briefly go into the saloon bar before leaving to visit four more pubs: 'He walked across to the White Horse and drank one bitter. Next he visited the Morning Star and the Heaton Arms. He finished up at the Harbinger.’ (p1) Of these, The Rye Hotel has gone through several similar names and currently trades as The Rye, The White Horse is still there (as of March 2021), The Morning Star became the Nag’s Head, The Heaton Arms has been demolished and replaced with flats and whilst a pub named the Harbinger is not known to have ever existed author Ed Glinert claims it was based on the now-demolished Golden Lion.
	The Seven Stars, Brick Lane	White Chappell, Scarlet Tracings (1987), Iain Sinclair	One of a number of pubs visited by a group including the narrator who are investigating rumours and legends surrounding Jack the Ripper: ‘The sign of the Pleiades hangs, stars joined into a pint pot, over a public house on the west side of Brick Lane: The Seven Stars. Brides of the Pleiades.’ (Ch. 6) Dating back to 1711, it was rebuilt in 1937, closed in November 2002 and is currently derelict though the car park is now a street art hotspot.
	The Shakespeare, Victoria	Hangover Square (1941), Patrick Hamilton	The book’s protagonist, George Harvey Bone, visits on the way back from Brighton: 'He had some drinks at the 'Shakespeare' opposite Victoria, and everybody was very excited. There was a strange atmosphere altogether.' (p269)
	The Shakespeare’s Head, Clerkenwell	Albert Angelo (1964), B. S. Johnson	Albert Angelo, the narrator, walks by the pub and recalls that it was built on the site of a previous pub that collapsed: ‘The Shakespeare’s Head. New pub. Old one fell down. Ten minutes after closing time one night, just as all the operalovers [sic] were wending their uplifted ways homeward, the front of the pub fell out.’ (p118)
	The Sir George Robey, Finsbury Park	Trainspotting (1993), Irvine Welsh	After carrying out a drug deal, 'Sick Boy and Begbie go to shoot what proves to be a competitive game of pool in the Sir George Robey.' (p340). Closed in 2004. Also appears in pseudonymous form in Fever Pitch by Nick Hornby; see below section.
	Spaniards Inn, Hampstead	Dracula (1897), Bram Stoker and The Pickwick Papers (1837), Charles Dickens	The pub appears in Dracula as the place where Van Helsing and Dr Seward finish their graveside vigil, with Seward noting in his diary: ‘By good chance we got a cab near the “Spaniards,” and drove to town.’ (Ch. 15) In The Pickwick Papers it is where Mrs Bardell plots against Mr Pickwick, with her saying: ‘I’m sure you ought to feel very much honoured at you and Tommy being the only gentlemen to escort so many ladies all the way to the Spaniards, at Hampstead.’ (Ch. 46)
	The Tabard, Southwark	The Canterbury Tales (c.1400), Geoffrey Chaucer	The opening takes place here as the pilgrims set off for Canterbury. Established in 1307, the pub was rebuilt in 1629 as The Talbot and demolished in 1875.
	Ten Bells, Spitalfields	From Hell (1999), Alan Moore and Eddie Campbell	In chapter 6, page 23, Inspector Abberline enters the pub whilst investigating the Jack the Ripper murders. The pub has long-since been associated with the Ripper killings, though no definite link has ever been conclusively proven. The pub also appears in the 2001 film adaptation.
	The Three Tuns, Beckenham	The Buddha of Suburbia (1990), Hanif Kureishi	At the start of the novel the protagonist, Karim Amir, drags his father off the bus and into the pub to see Kevin Ayers perform: 'I persuaded Dad to stop off at the Three Tuns in Beckenham. I got off the bus; Dad had no choice but to follow me.'(p8) During the 1960s it was the venue in which the Beckenham Arts Lab was hosted by David Bowie, who later provided the soundtrack for the TV adaptation of the novel. Later changed its name to the Rat and Parrot and is currently (as of March 2021) a branch of Zizzi.
	The Trader, Whitecross Street	Memphis Underground (2007), Stewart Home	The narrator goes there to meet his friend Captain Swanky: 'I met Swanky in The Trader on Whitecross Street' (p3). Closed in 2018 and as of March 2021 known as the Whitecross Tap (pictured).
	Viaduct Tavern, Newgate Street	Under the Net (1954), Iris Murdoch	Visited by the narrator, Jake Donoghue, whilst on a pub crawl in search of Hugo, an old friend: 'We strode past St Sepulchre and straight into the Viaduct Tavern.' (p105-6)
	The Wheatsheaf, Southwark	White Chappell, Scarlet Tracings (1987), Iain Sinclair	Visited by a group looking into the hidden history of London, only for them to leave when the resident pub bore starts offering his opinions on the 18th century poet Thomas Chatterton: If you can find a working market you’ll find a pub worth drinking in. When the workers are gone — a quiet one. We approach the Wheatsheaf, ‘TAKE COURAGE.’ (Ch. 7). Pictured in 2009, during its closure, but has since been renovated and re-opened.
	The White Hart, Whitechapel	Memphis Underground (2007), Stewart Home	Visited by the narrator: ‘I ended up in the White Hart more often than the pub merited, mainly on account of my weakness for Adnams Suffolk Ales... The drinkers were usually a mix of city types and locals who didn't quite gel together.’ (p119)
	The White Horse, Peckham	The Ballad of Peckham Rye (1960), Muriel Spark	Visited by Humphrey Page as part of his pub crawl in the opening chapter; see entry for The Rye Hotel for full details.

== Pubs depicted using pseudonyms or otherwise believed to be the basis for fictional portrayals ==
Image	Name	Pseudonymous name	Appears In	Notes
The Dove	The Dove, Hammersmith	The Pigeons	The Water Gipsies (1930), A. P. Herbert	Along with being depicted in fictional form, the pub was apparently a regular haunt of Graham Greene.
	The Golden Cross, Portobello Road	The Black Cross	London Fields (1989), Martin Amis	Despite the book's title it is set in West London, and the Black Cross is a haunt of protagonist and darts enthusiast Keith Talent. Renovated and renamed the Market Bar in the 1990s by singer and actor John Leyton. Became Shannon’s Bar in the late 2000s (photo is from 2009) then Ukai in the mid-2010s.
	The Grapes, Limehouse	The Six Jolly Fellowship Porters	Our Mutual Friend (1865), Charles Dickens	Thought to be the basis for the similarly small riverside pub that Dickens describes as follows: ‘The bar of the Six Jolly Fellowship Porters was a bar to soften the human breast. The available space in it was not much larger than a hackney-coach; but no one could have wished the bar bigger, that space was so girt in by corpulent little casks, and by cordial-bottles radiant with fictitious grapes in bunches,’ (Ch. 6)
	Green Man, Putney		The War of the Worlds (1898), H. G. Wells	Whilst making his way from Surrey to London the narrator reports that he ‘spent that night in the inn that stands at the top of Putney Hill’, making this a strong contender for being the one referred to.
	Newman Arms, Fitzrovia		Nineteen Eighty-Four (1949), and Keep the Aspidistra Flying (1936), George Orwell	Believed to be the basis for the pub that Winston Smith enters in order to speak to some ‘proles’ in 1984 and also thought to be the setting for scenes in Keep the Aspidistra Flying in which Gordon Comstock and Ravelston have an argument.
	The Old Bull and Bush, Hampstead	The Cow and Hedge	The Diary of a Nobody (1892), George and Weedon Grossmith	Charles Pooter and his friends visit after a walk on Hampstead Heath only to encounter difficulties due to a law insisting that only ‘travellers’ can be served at that time of day, and not locals.
	The Prince of Wales Feathers, Fitzrovia	The Midnight Bell	20,000 Streets Under the Sky (1929-1934), Patrick Hamilton	Known to be a haunt of Patrick Hamilton, this is thought to be the basis for the pub after which the first part of the trilogy is named, where two of the main characters, Bob and Ella, live and work.
	The Sir George Robey, Finsbury Park	The Harry Lauder	Fever Pitch (1992), Nick Hornby	Re-named in the book by taking the name of one music hall artist, Sir George Robey, and replacing it with that of his contemporary Sir Harry Lauder, as confirmed by Nick Hornby at a Q&A. Demolished in 2004.
	The Windmill, Clapham Common	The Pontefract Arms	The End of the Affair (1951), Graham Greene	Believed to be the pub depicted in the novel's opening pages, where Maurice Bendrix and Henry Miles meet and the toilet graffiti wishes customers, ‘a merry syphilis and a happy gonorrhea.’ (p3). Picture is from 2009 when it was known as The Windmill on the Common.

== Sources ==
- Ackroyd, Peter (2000). London: The Biography. London: Chatto & Windus. ISBN 9780099422587.
- Coverley, Merlin (2005). The Pocket Essential London Writing. Harpenden: Pocket Essentials. ISBN 978-1-904048-48-0.
- Glinert, Ed (2004). The London Compendium: A Street-by-Street Exploration of the Hidden Metropolis. London: Penguin Books. ISBN 0-141-01213-7.
- Glinert, Ed (2007). Literary London: A Street-by-Street Exploration of the Capital's Literary Heritage. London: Penguin Books. ISBN 978-0-141-02624-4.
- Herringshaw, Paul (18 June 2009). "London's literary pubs". Time Out. London.
- Jones, Richard (2001). Walking Haunted London. London: New Holland Publishers (UK) Ltd. ISBN 1-84330-046-X.
- Mason, Mark (2011). Walk the Lines: The London Underground, Overground. London: Random House Books. ISBN 9781847946539.
- Rennison, Nick (2006). The Book of Lists: London. Edinburgh: Canongate. ISBN 978-1-84767-666-5.
- Rhodes, Dan (13 March 2004). "Unhappy Hour". The Guardian. London.
- Talling, Paul (2008). Derelict London. London: Random House Books. ISBN 9781905211432.
- Wallace, David (1990). London: The Circle Line Guide. London: Penguin. ISBN 978-0140103311.

== See also ==
- List of fictional bars and pubs
