= Longest bar in Australia =

Features of drinking establishments

Coordinates: 34°11′15.34″S 142°09′37.30″E

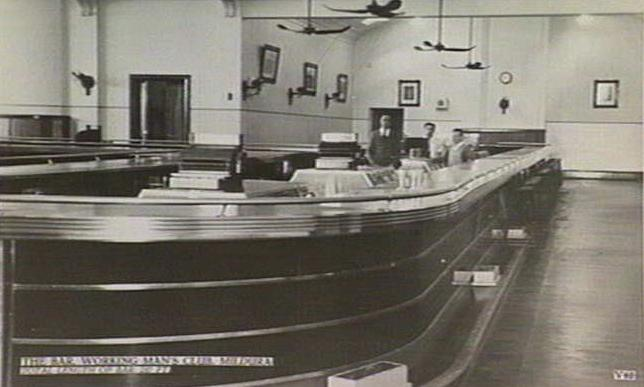
The Mildura Working Man's Club in 1945, bar length 91 metres (299 ft)

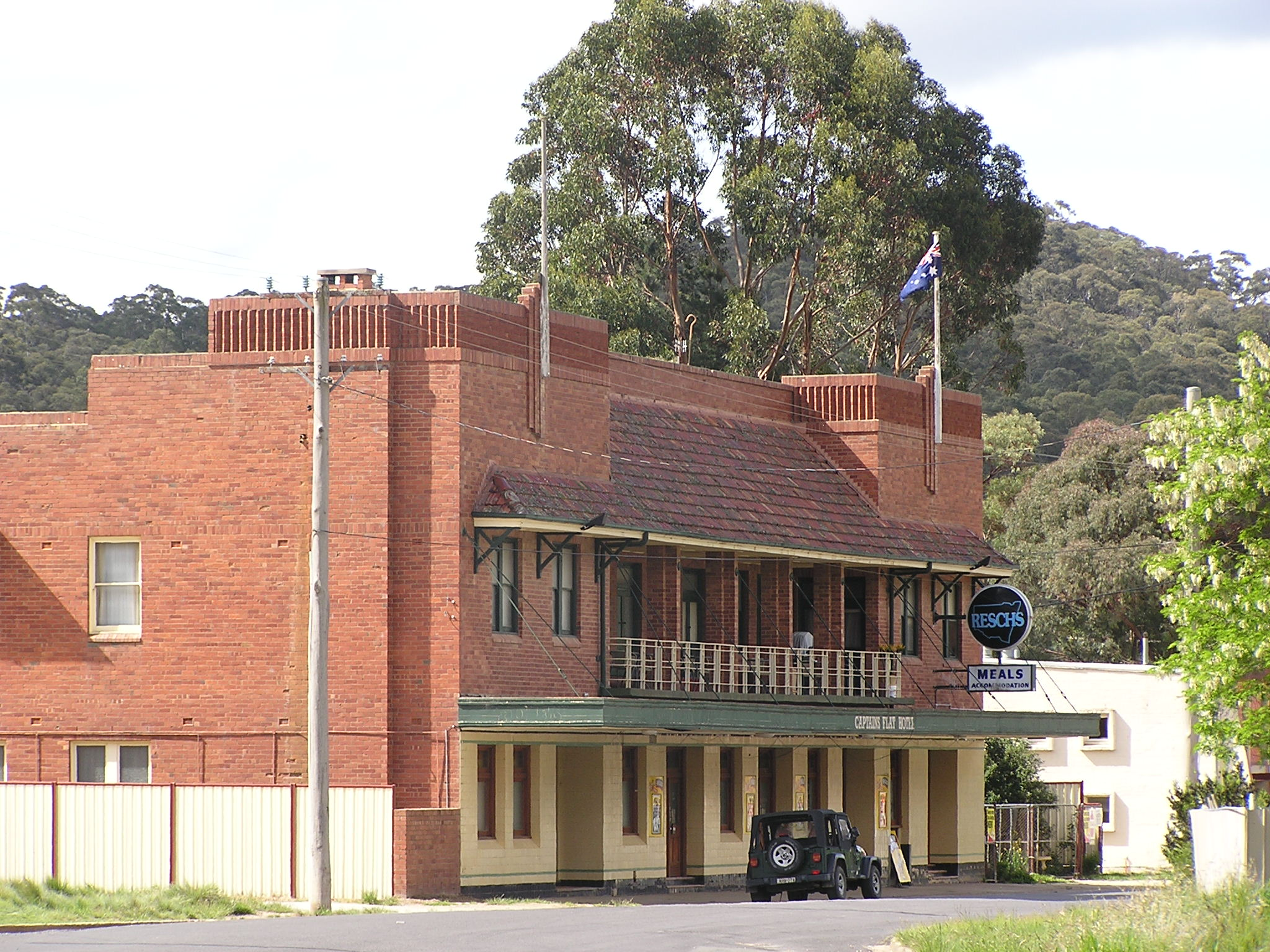
Captains Flat Hotel

As with any such statistic, there are a number of claims for the title "the longest bar in Australia":

- Captains Flat, New South Wales: When the new Captains Flat Hotel was built in 1937, it was said to have the longest bar in Australia at the time; it was 32 metres (105 ft) long.
- Mildura, Victoria: The Mildura Working Man's Sports & Social Club built a T-shaped bar in 1938. It was believed to be the longest bar in Victoria. In 1970 it was rebuilt with a hook and was noted in the Guinness Book of Records as holding world record length status. The bar was 91 metres (299 ft) long around "the centre line of the service surface" and had 32 beer taps. The bar was removed in 1995 during renovations to add poker machines.
- Big Bell, Western Australia: the hotel of an abandoned township in the Murchison region in Western Australia.
- Wiluna, Western Australia: The old Weeloona Hotel (demolished in the mid-1970s) was reputed to have the world's longest bar.
- Melbourne, Victoria: The bar at The Trust in Flinders Lane is said to be over 40 metres (130 ft) long.

== See also ==
- Mojo Record Bar
- Six o'clock swill
