= List of former public houses and coffeehouses in Boston =

This is a partial list of former public houses and coffeehouses in Boston, Massachusetts. In the 17th and 18th centuries in particular these types of venues functioned also as meeting spaces for business, politics, theater, concerts, exhibitions, and other secular activities.

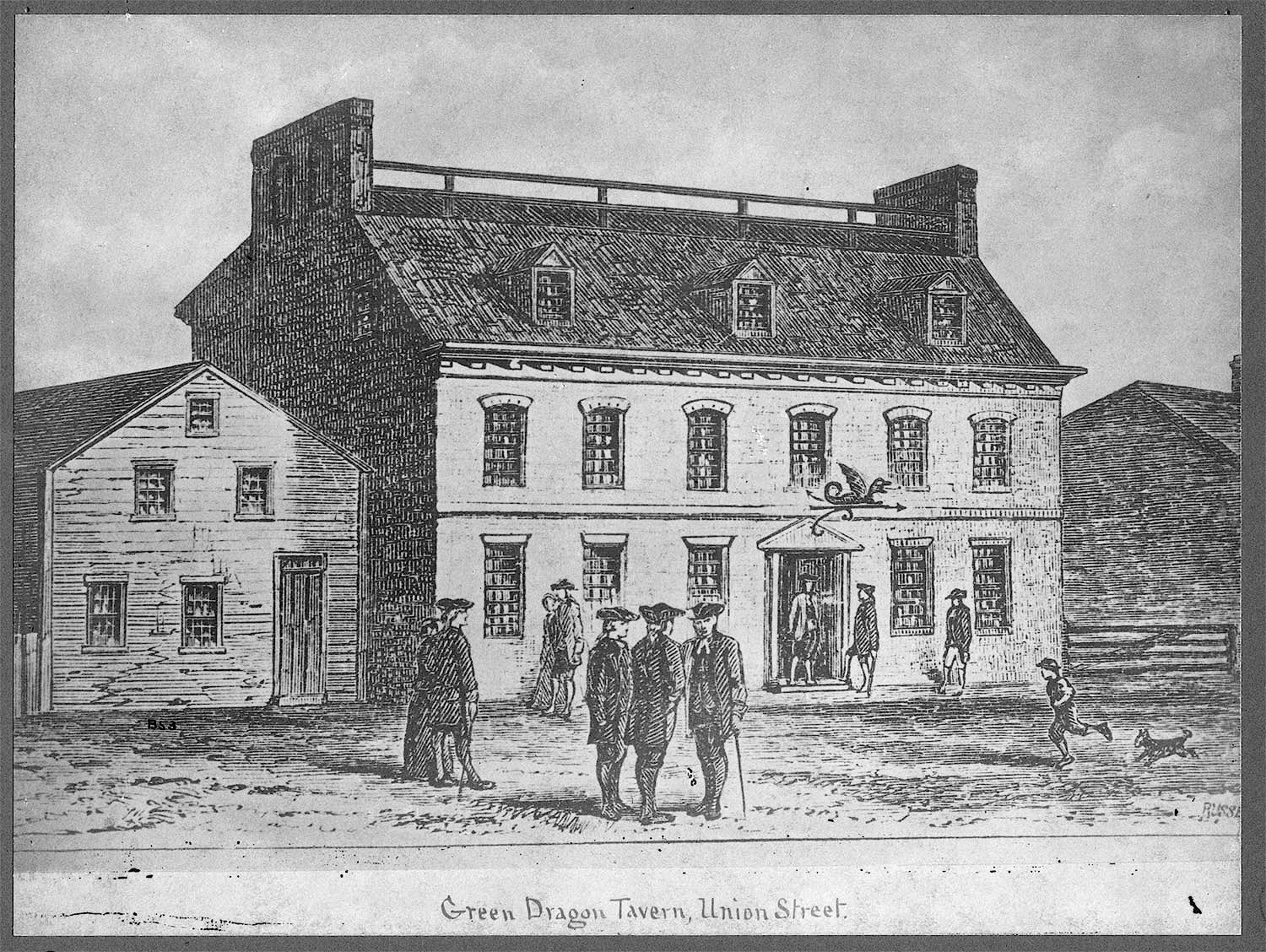
Green Dragon, Union St., 18th century

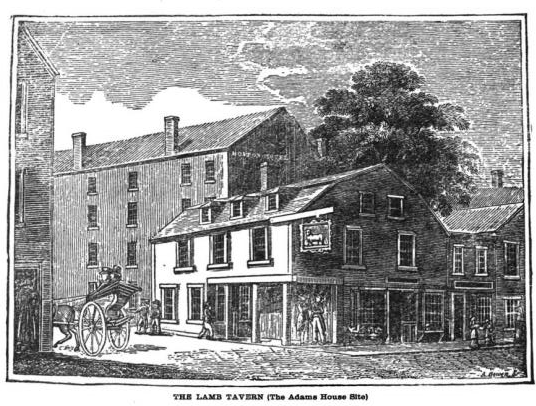
Lamb Tavern, c. 18th century

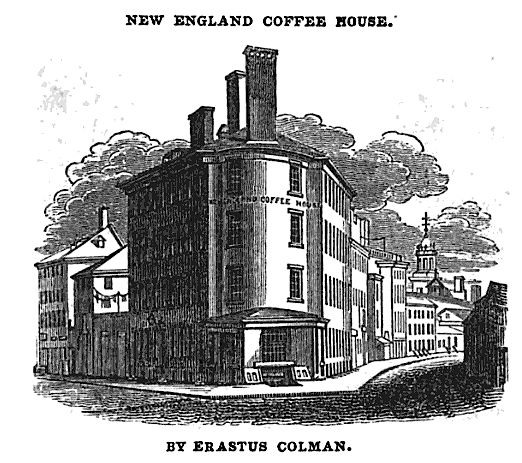
New England Coffee House, Clinton St., as it appeared in 1838

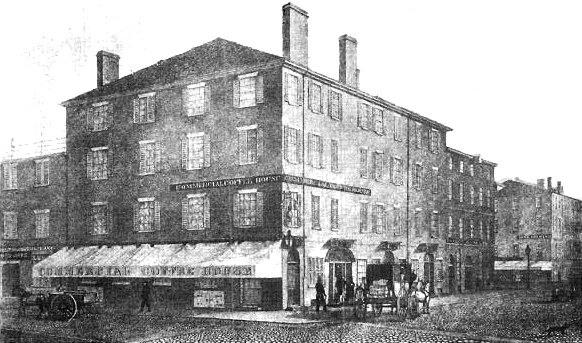
Commercial Coffee House, corner Milk St. and Batterymarch St., Boston

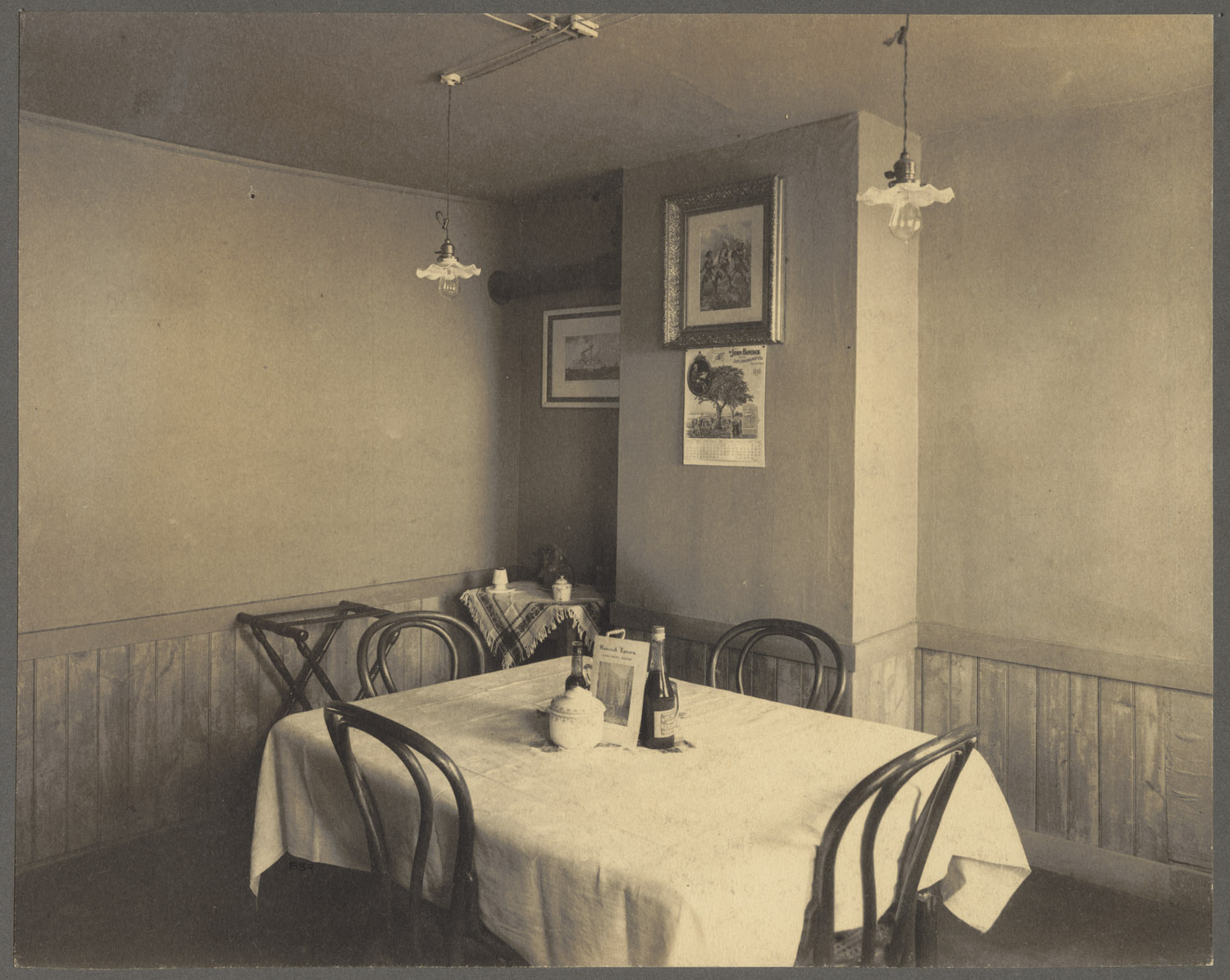
Hancock Tavern, Corn Ct., c. 1898

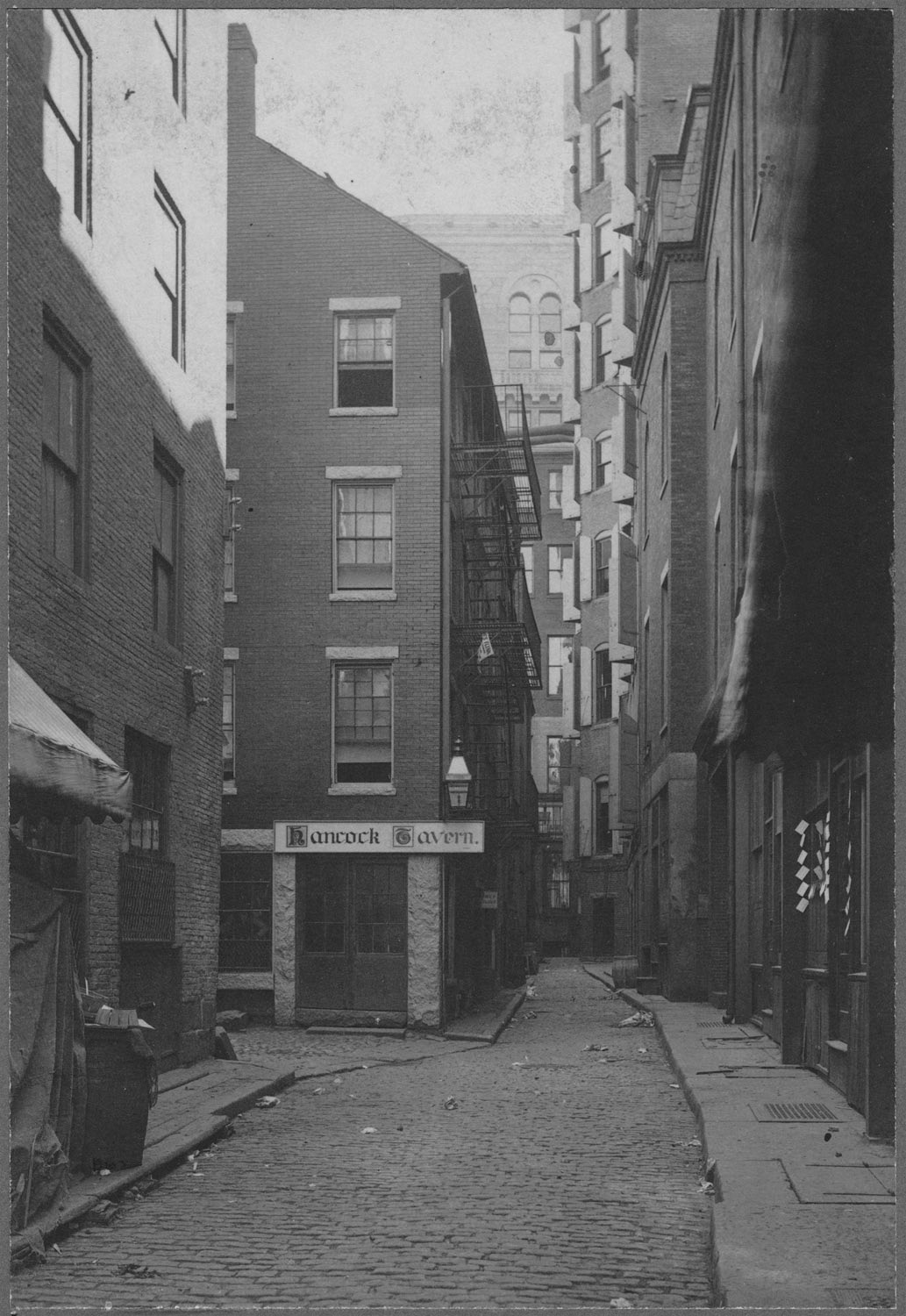
Hancock Tavern, Corn Ct., c. 1898

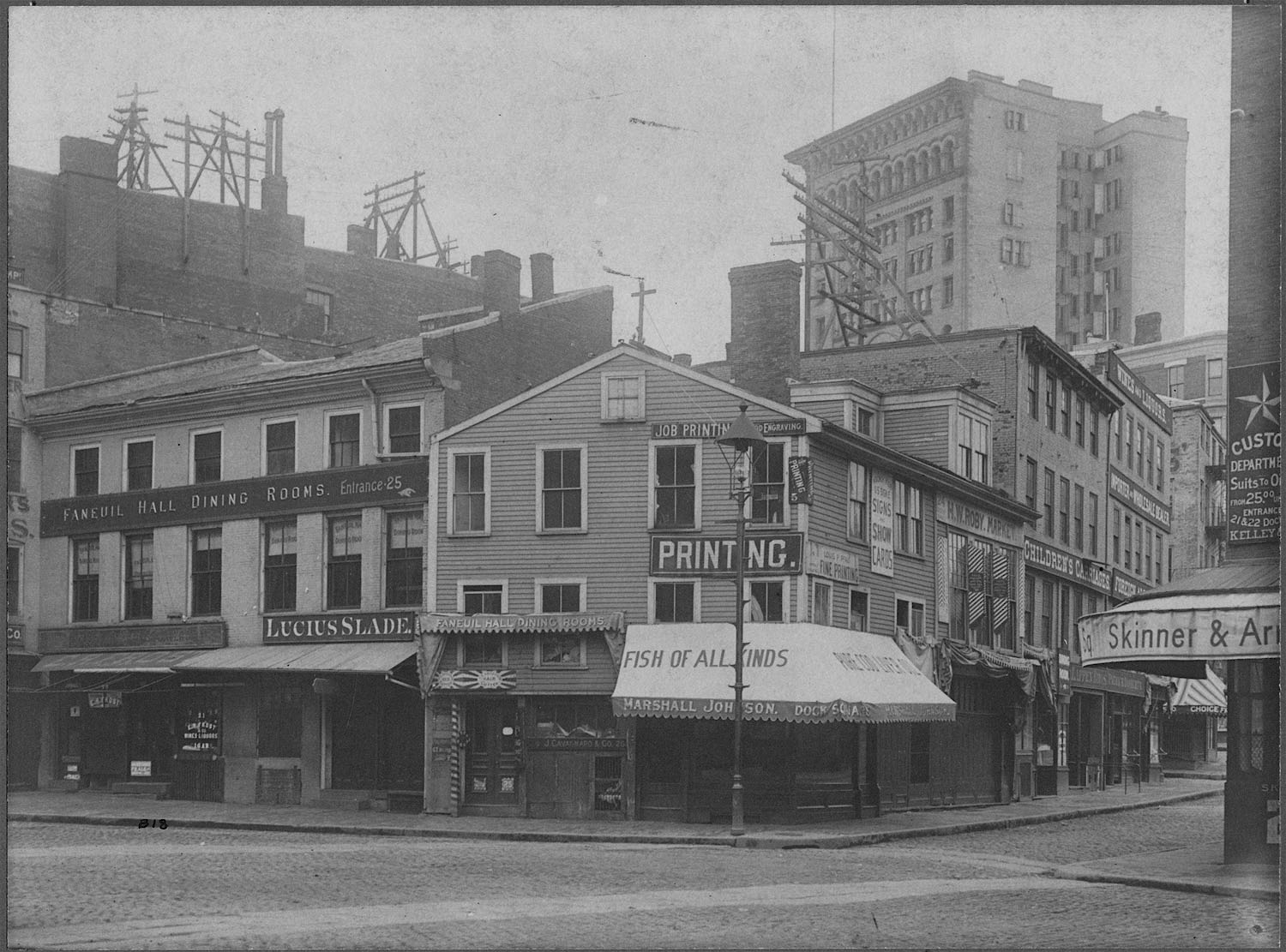
Sun Tavern, Dock Square, 19th century

- Admiral Vernon, southeast corner of State and Merchants Row.
- Albion, north corner of Beacon and Tremont.
- Beal's Inn, near Faneuil Hall Market in Dock Square.
- Bite or Bight, Faneuil Hall Square west of Change Avenue.
- Black Horse, west side of Prince Street.
- Blue Anchor, Globe Building.
- Blue Bell, northwest corner Batterymarch and Liberty Square.
- British Coffee House, 66 State Street.
- Bromfield House, 34 Bromfield Street.
- Bull, southwest corner of Summer and Federal.
- Bull's Head, northeast corner Congress and Water.
- Bunch of Grapes, northwest corner State and Kilby.
- Cape Breton, corner Main and Hancock Square.
- Castle, southwest corner Dock Square and Elm.
- Columbian Coffee House, 17 Court Street.
- Commercial Coffee House, northeast corner Milk and Batterymarch.
- Concert Hall, southeast corner Hanover and Court.
- Congress House, northeast corner Pearl and High.
- Copp's, south side City Square.
- Cornhill Coffee House, Cornhill Court.
- Cromwell's Head, 13 School Street.
- Cross, northwest corner North and Cross.
- Crown Coffee House, southwest corner State and Chatham Row.
- Dolphin, Fish, later North Street.
- Dove, Masonic Temple.
- Eagle Coffee House, Lewis corner Fulton.
- Earle's Coffee House, 24 Hanover Street.
- Eastern Exchange Hotel, Eastern Avenue.
- Eastern R. R. House, 115 Commercial Street.
- Eastern Stage House, 90 North Street.
- Eastern Steamboat House, 23 Commercial Street.
- Elephant, off North Street.
- Elm Street Hotel, northeast corner Elm and Washington.
- Evan's, Ann, later North Street.
- Exchange Coffee House, Congress, State and Devonshire.
- Exchange, southwest corner State and Exchange.
- Flower de Luce, northeast corner Bartlett and Blanchard.
- Fobes, Market and Brattle Square.
- Foster's Coffee House, corner Court and Howard.
- Fourth Ward House 9 Wilson's Lane.
- Franklin House, Merchants Row opposite Clinton.
- George, Washington south of Lenox.
- German Coffee House, 155 Pleasant Street.
- Globe, Commercial near Hanover.
- Golden Ball, southeast corner Chatham and Merchants Row.
- Grand Turk, Bijou Theatre.
- Green Dragon Tavern, Union west of Hanover.
- Greyhound, Washington opposite Vernon.
- Grotou House, 10 Sudbury Street.
- Half Moon, south corner Portland and Hanover.
- Hancock House, Corn Court.
- Hatch's, south corner Tremont and Mason.
- Hazlitt's, corner Washington and Palmer.
- Holland's Coffee House, Howard near Court.
- Horse Shoe, Tremont near Boylston.
- Indian Chief, Harvard Church.
- Indian Queen, Bromfield Street.
- Indian Queen, Parker Block, Washington Street.
- Jefferson House, Prince Street, south side.
- Julien's Restorator, restaurant, Post Office Square.
- Kent's, Grove Hall.
- King's Arms, formerly George Tavern.
- King's Arms, southeast corner Brattle and Washington.
- King's Head, northeast corner Lewis and North.
- Lafayette House, Washington opposite Boylston Market.
- Lamb, Adams House.
- Liberty Tree, southeast corner Essex and Washington.
- Lighthouse, northwest corner State and Devonshire.
- Lion, Bijou Theatre.
- Logwood Tree, Commercial Street.
- Mansion House, Milk between Hawley and Arch.
- Mansion House, south side City Square.
- Manufacturer's Hotel, southeast corner Salem and North Margin.
- Mareans, Elm Street and Dock Square.
- Marlboro Hotel, formerly Rising Sun.
- Marlborough Head, King now State Street.
- Miller's, afterward McLean Hospital.
- Mitre, Ship now Commercial.
- Montgomery House, northeast corner Bromfield and Tremont.
- Mt. Washington House, Washington Heights.
- New England Coffee House, Clinton Street.
- Noah's Ark, or Ship Tavern.
- Oliver Cromwell Tavern, School St.
- Orange Tree, northeast corner Court and Hanover.
- Page's, corner Main and Gardner.
- Paine's Tavern or White Horse.
- Painters' Arms, Hanover Street.
- Patterson's, Elm Street junction Washington.
- Peacock, southwest corner Centre and Allandale.
- Pearl Street House, northwest corner Pearl and Milk.
- Pease's, St. Paul's Church.
- Peirce's, northeast corner Charles River Avenue and Water Street.
- Pemberton House, Howard near Tremont Row.
- Perkins' House, Pearl between Milk and High.
- Philadelphia, opposite Hancock Wharf, North Street.
- Pine Tree, Dock Square.
- Piper's, southwest corner Main and Alford.
- Potter's Orange now Washington Street.
- Punch Bowl, Brookline Gas Works.
- Punch Bowl, Dock Square. (1789)
- Queen's Head, northwest corner North and Clark.
- Red Lion, northwest corner Richmond and North.
- Red, northwest corner Washington and Vernon.
- Ridgway's, Exchange Street.
- Rising Sun, Washington nearly opposite Franklin.
- Robbin's, west side City Square.
- Roebuck, Merchants Row, between Clinton and North.
- Rose and Crown, southwest corner State and Devonshire.
- Salutation, northwest corner Hanover and Salutation.
- Seven Star, west corner Summer and Hawley.
- Shakespeare, Water below Devonshire.
- Ship in Distress, Fleet opposite Moon.
- Ship, North near Fleet.
- Ship, southeast corner Charles River Avenue and Water.
- Stackpole House, Milk on Post Office site.
- Star, northeast corner Hanover and Union.
- State Arms, southeast corner State and Exchange.
- Sun Tavern, southwest corner Dock and Faneuil Hall Squares.
- Swan, northeast corner Fleet and North.
- Swan, Washington corner Hollis.
- Three Mariners, State near Merchants Row.
- Tremont House, south corner Tremont and Beacon.
- Turnbull's, northeast corner Charles River Avenue and Water.
- Two Palavers.
- Washington Coffee House, Boston Transcript.
- Washington Hotel, later Bromfield House.
- Washington House, Washington Market.
- White Horse, Washington south of Avery.
- Wilde's, Elm junction of Washington.
- Winthrop House, Masonic Temple.
- Yankee Hero, Elm Street.

== See also ==
- List of public house topics
