= Rail Ale Ramble =

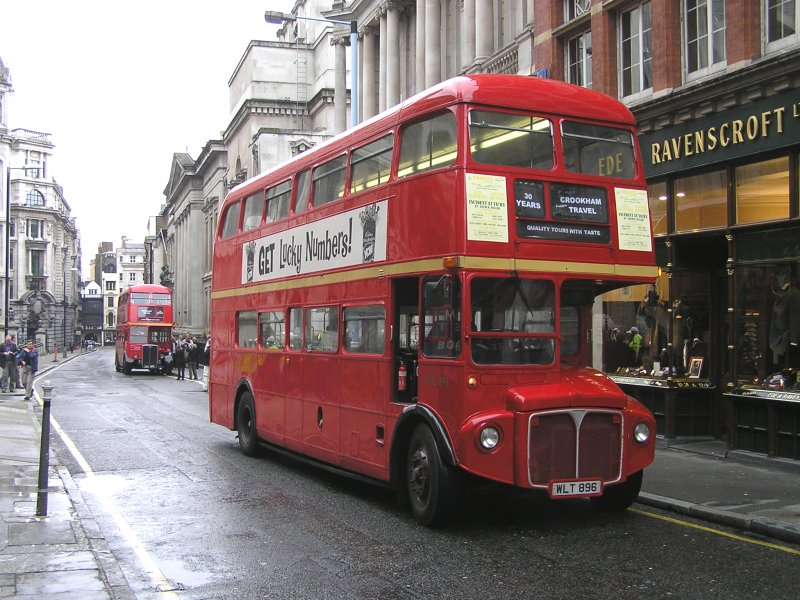
Two double-decker buses with special destination blinds carried passengers to the Knights Templar pub in central London as part of a celebration of 30 years of Rail Ale Rambles in 2007

Sometimes now used as a generic expression in the United Kingdom for a day tour of pubs and/or breweries by train, in search of "real ale" (cask-conditioned beer), the marketing name Rail Ale Ramble was originally conceived by Gerald Daniels, who runs an English tour company, Crookham Travel. In October 1977 he ran the first "RAR", a chartered train with 596 passengers from London to Bath, Somerset and Oxford.

At that time traditional cask-conditioned beer was rare in London, but the Campaign for Real Ale (CAMRA) was beginning to have more impact in regional centres where there was a greater range of traditional breweries still supplying this "living" beer.

More than thirty years later Crookham Travel still runs several Rail Ale Rambles each year as well as longer trips to explore surviving regional and local breweries and the increasing number of new microbreweries throughout Britain and beyond. Meanwhile, the term Rail Ale has been adopted by organisations such as the Devon & Cornwall Rail Partnership, which promote rural train routes in the English West Country as rail ale trails.

== See also ==
- List of public house topics
