= Barback =

Bartender's assistant

A barback (sometimes spelled as bar-back, also commonly known as a runner in Europe or a glassy in Australia) is a bartender's assistant. They are responsible for keeping the bar stocked, clean, and user-friendly for the bartender. Barbacks work in nightclubs, bars, pubs, restaurants, and catering halls and usually receive a portion of the bartender's tips. Barbacks are often under the tutelage of a bartender and work their way up to a bartending job.

Barbacks are essentially commis bartenders, and are there to simplify a bartender's job and prepare the bar by stocking it with liquor, ice, glassware, beer, garnishes, and so on. During the evening, they also collect and wash dirty dishes and glassware, clean tables (though there is a busser for this in larger bars), change kegs, and help to pack up the bar after closing time.

Although the legal drinking age in the United States is 21, the minimum age to work as a bartender or barback varies from 18 to 21.

== See also ==
- List of public house topics
