= List of fictional bars and pubs =

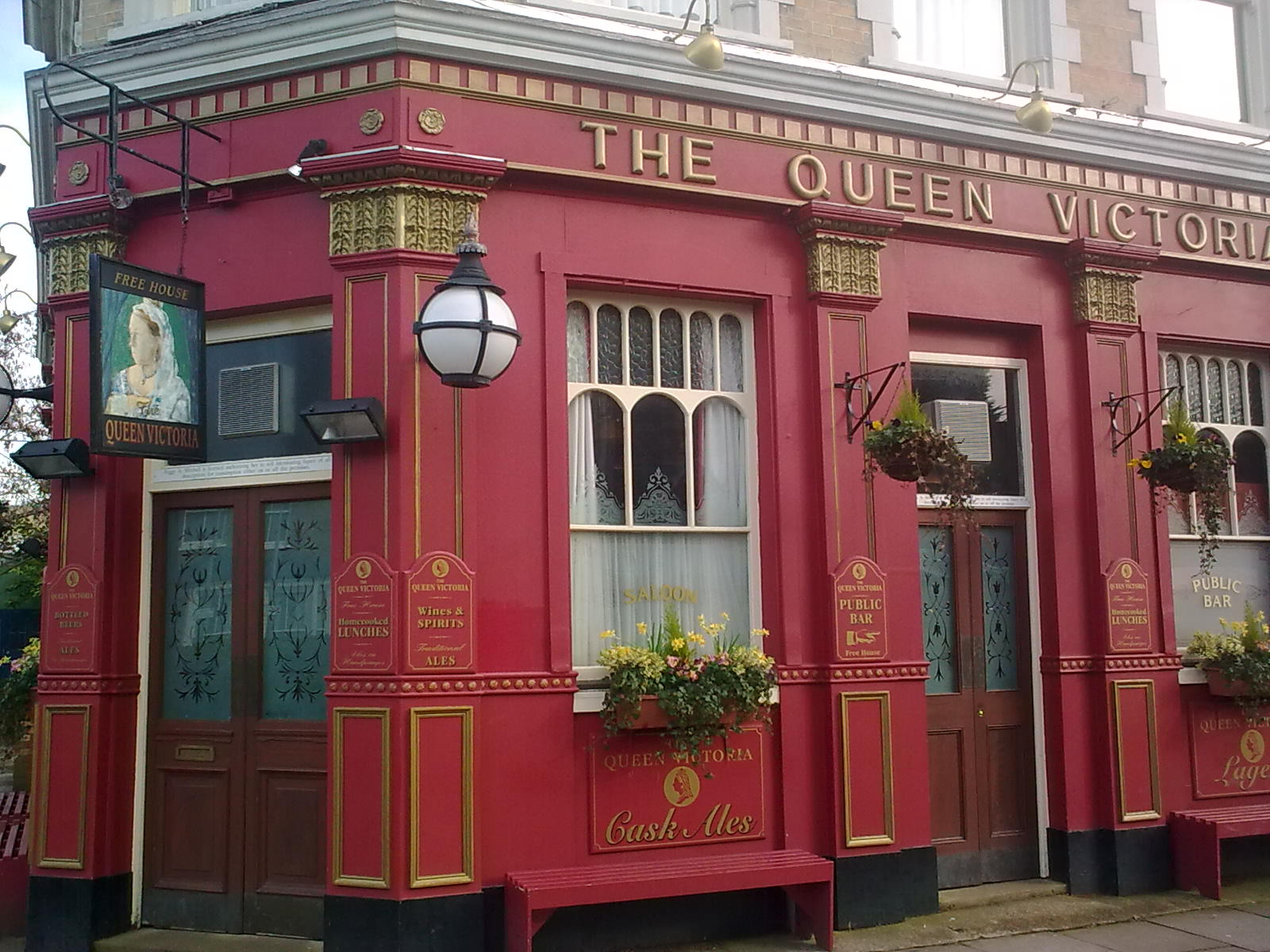
The Queen Victoria

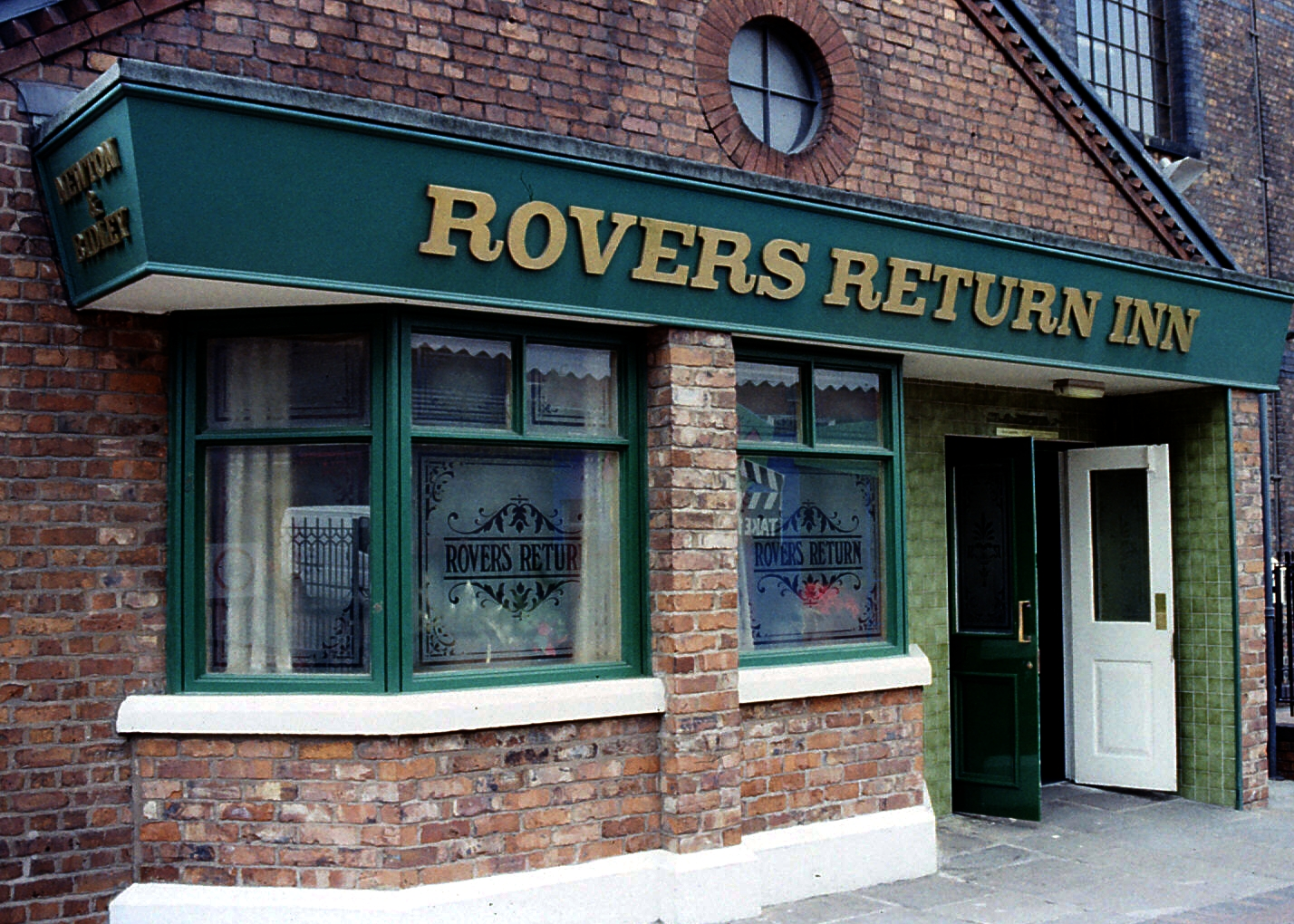
Rovers Return Inn

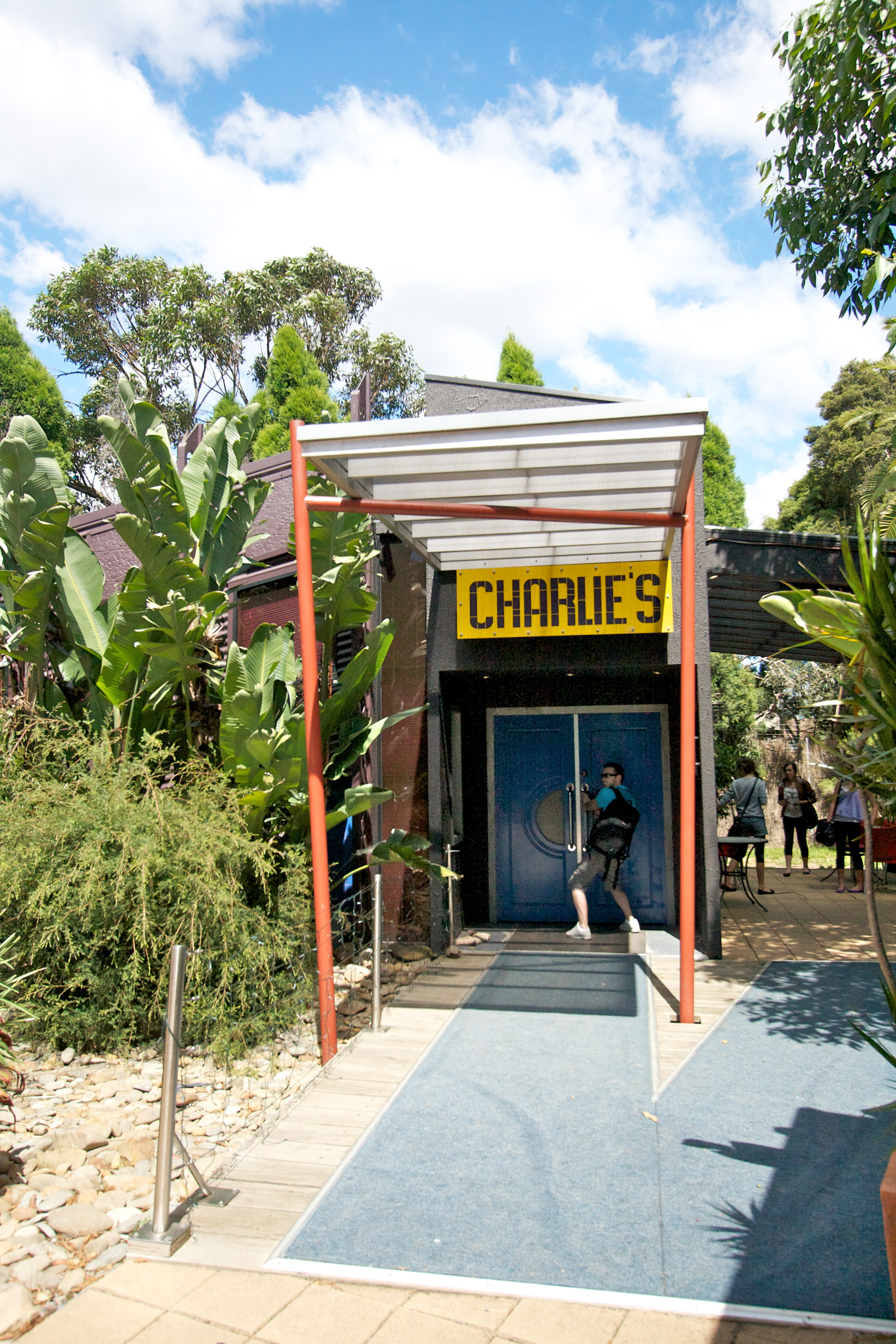
Charlie's

This is a list of notable fictional bars and pubs.

== A ==
- Ace of Clubs – Smallville
- The Admiral's Arms – Queen of the Damned
- The Admiral Benbow Inn – Treasure Island
- Ahhh, Bistro - Grand Theft Auto: Liberty City Stories
- The Aidensfield Arms – Heartbeat
- The Aigburth Arms – Red Dwarf
- Alibi Bar – Nick Knatterton
- The Alibi Room – Shameless
- The Anchor – Dad's Army
- Angel of Death Clubhouse - Grand Theft Auto IV (2008)
- The Angler's Rest – the Mr. Mulliner books by P. G. Wodehouse: Meet Mr Mulliner (1927), Mr Mulliner Speaking (1929), and Mulliner Nights (1933)
- Archer Hotel – Two Pints of Lager and a Packet of Crisps (2001–2011)
- Archie Bunker's Place – Archie Bunker's Place
- The Armada Room (at the Hilton Hotel) – where The Blues Brothers track down Murph & the Magic Tones
- Attica Bar – Grand Theft Auto: San Andreas

== B ==
- BA – Grand Theft Auto: Liberty City Stories
- BB Saloon – Gekisou Sentai Carranger
- Babylon – Queer as Folk US
- The Back Lane Bar – Neighbours
- Bahama Mamas - Grand Theft Auto IV (2008)
- The Ballroom – Community, episode "Mixology Certification"
- The Bamboo Lounge – Goodfellas (1990)
- The Bang Bang Bar – Twin Peaks (1990)
- The Bannered Mare – The Elder Scrolls V: Skyrim
- Barbary Coast Saloon – Around the World in 80 Days (1956)
- Bar Salade – Grownups
- Basement Dive – The Voice of Terror
- The Bay Bar - Grand Theft Auto V (2013)
- The Bee and Barb – The Elder Scrolls V: Skyrim
- The Beehive – The World's End (2013): The ninth of 12 pubs on the "golden mile" pub crawl
- Bellefleur's Bar and Grill – True Blood (2008)
- Benzinger's Bar – JAG (1995–2005)
- Big Als Liquor —Grand Theft Auto III (2001)
- The Bigger Jigger —Mama's Family (1983)
- The Black Bull – Emmerdale
- Black Eyes Bar (Detroit) —Undateable (2014)
- Black Horse – Whatever Happened to the Likely Lads?
- The Black Lion – Dad's Army
- The Black Swan – Family Affairs
- The Blake Hotel – The Full Monty
- Blarneys Irish Pub – 2 Broke Girls
- Blinking Skull – Dick Tracy's Dilemma
- The Bloated Float Inn – The Elder Scrolls IV: Oblivion (an inn located within a converted ship that still sits on the water)
- The Blue Anchor – New Tricks
- Blue Boar Inn – The Adventures of Robin Hood (Howard Pyle, TV series starring Richard Greene)
- Blue Hell – Gateway
- The Blue Oyster Bar – Police Academy franchise
- The Blue Parrot – rival bar run by Sydney Greenstreet's character Signor Ferrari in Casablanca
- The Boar's Head – Henry IV, Part 1 and Henry IV, Part 2 by William Shakespeare
- The Boar's Nest – The Dukes of Hazzard
- The Boatman – Four Weddings and a Funeral (1994); The Kings Arms, 30 High Street, Amersham, HP7 0DJ
- Bob's Country Bunker – The Blues Brothers, later renamed Bob's Country Kitchen in the sequel
- Boobies – Space Dandy
- Border Watch Inn – The Elder Scrolls IV: Oblivion
- The Bowlers Fist - Grand Theft Auto III (2001)
- Bottiglia Liquor Wholesale Grand Theft Auto: Liberty City Stories and Grand Theft Auto: Vice City Stories
- Brady Pub – Days of Our Lives
- Braidwood Inn – The Elder Scrolls V: Skyrim
- The Brass Lantern – Fallout 3
- The Brick – Northern Exposure
- The Broken Drum/The Mended Drum – Ankh-Morpork in Terry Pratchett's Discworld
- Broken Keel Tavern – World of Warcraft
- The Broken Stool – The Cleveland Show
- The Bronze – Buffy the Vampire Slayer (1997)
- Broome's (Coast City) – Arrow, episode "Legacies"
- The Buck's Head Inn – Far from the Madding Crowd, by Thomas Hardy
- The Bull – The Archers, BBC radio series
- The Bull – Beast
- Bull and Butcher – The Day of the Triffids
- Bunnys – The Young Doctors
- Burger Bar – Red Dwarf
- The Butchers Arms – Last of the Summer Wine

== C ==
- Café René – 'Allo 'Allo!
- Callahan's Place – Callahan's Crosstime Saloon
- Candlehearth Hall – The Elder Scrolls V: Skyrim
- Candlelight Club – Waterloo Bridge (1940)
- Candy Tavern/Dirt Beer Guy's Tavern – Adventure Time/Adventure Time: Fionna and Cake
- The Cap & Bell – Saloon Bar (1940)
- The Cat & Fiddle – the other pub in The Archers, BBC radio series
- Catherines Bar – Death in Paradise
- Charlie's – Harvey (1950), starring James Stewart
- Charlie's – Neighbours
- Chatsubo – Neuromancer, 1984 novel by William Gibson
- Cheers – Cheers
- Chez Quis – Ferris Bueller's Day Off
- China Coast – Alias Nick Beal
- The Clansman – Still Game
- Clintz Bar – Grand Theft Auto: Vice City and Grand Theft Auto: Vice City Stories
- Club Liberty - Grand Theft Auto IV (2008)
- Club Obi Wan – Indiana Jones and the Temple of Doom (1984)
- Club Pluto – The Adventures of Pluto Nash (2002)
- Cocktails and Dreams – Cocktail (1988)
- Cohan's – The Quiet Man (1952)
- Colcot Arms – Gavin & Stacey
- Colonial Taphouse – Fallout 4
- Copa – Rownd a Rownd
- Copacabana – Goodfellas
- The Corral – Terminator 2: Judgment Day
- Comrades Bar - Grand Theft Auto IV (2008)
- The Count's Arms – The Elder Scrolls IV: Oblivion
- Countryman Inn – Jonathan Creek
- Cowshed aka Cow's Hed – Time Gentlemen Please
- The Crab & Lobster – Doc Martin (2004—)
- The Crab Shed – How I Met Your Mother, episode "Sunrise"
- The Craw Bar – Grand Theft Auto: San Andreas
- The Crazy Cock – Far Cry 3
- The Crazy Horse – The Sopranos
- Crockett's Bar & Grill - Grand Theft Auto: Vice City Stories (2005)
- Crocs Bar – Grand Theft Auto: Vice City
- The Cross Hands – The World's End: The fourth of 12 pubs on the "golden mile" pub crawl
- The Crow & Crown – Withnail and I (1987)
- The Crown – Hot Fuzz (2007)
- The Crown – Men Behaving Badly (1992—1998)
- The Crow's Nest – The Perfect Storm (2000)

== D ==
- Daddy Crab Leg's Crab Shack – Saving Hope, episode "Remains of the Day"
- Dagmar – the pub where Angie Watts works in EastEnders
- Dal Riata – Lost Girl
- De Rossi's Wine Bar – Doctor Who, episode "Partners in Crime"
- Dead Man's Drink – The Elder Scrolls V: Skyrim
- Dead Mike's – Scooby Doo (2002)
- Deri Arms – Pobol y Cwm
- Deville – Arrow, episode "Vertigo"
- Dexter Lake Club – National Lampoon's Animal House (1978)
- Diamond Sky – Grand Theft Auto Advance
- Diner Bar Cocktails - Grand Theft Auto IV (2008)
- Dino's Bar and Grill – The Boys Are Back In Town, 1976 song by Thin Lizzy, on their 6th studio album, Jailbreak
- The Dirty Sanchez – DodgeBall: A True Underdog Story
- The Dog and Handgun – Bottom, rival pub of The Lamb and Flag, staff are seen in the episode "Dough" (1995) during the quiz night scene at the aforementioned pub, with one barman getting a near-fatal electric shock from the buzzer, after Edward Hitler (Adrian Edmondson) tampered with it earlier. The pub is never actually seen in the series.
- The Dog and Dart – Mount Pleasant
- Dog And Duck – No Angels (2004–2006)
- The Dog and Gun – Coronation Street
- The Dog and Partridge – Dad's Army
- The Dog in the Pond – Hollyoaks
- The Dolphin – Peep Show
- The Domain of the King Bar and Grille – Mostly Harmless, fifth novel in The Hitchhiker's Guide to the Galaxy series by Douglas Adams
- Donnies Bar - Grand Theft Auto IV (2008)
- Dorsia – American Psycho (2000)
- Double Deuce – Road House (1989)
- The Dragon of Wantley – an inn in The Barchester Chronicles, making its first appearance in The Warden as belonging to "The Barchester Reformer", John Bold.
- The Downy Pelican – Poet's Pub (1949)
- The Draco Tavern - The Draco Tavern by Larry Niven
- The Dripping Dagger – Dick Tracy vs. Cueball
- The Drowned Trout – RocknRolla (2008)
- The Drovers Arms – All Creatures Great and Small
- The Drunken Clam – the bar and primary haunt of Peter Griffin in Family Guy
- The Drunken Dragon Inn – The Elder Scrolls IV: Oblivion
- The Drunken Huntsman – The Elder Scrolls V: Skyrim
- Duffy's Tavern – the titular establishment
- Dubh Linn Irish Brew – Ugly Betty
- Dugout Inn – Fallout 4
- The Duke Of Burgundy – Passport to Pimlico (1949)
- Duke's Pub – Frasier (Martin Crane's favorite hangout until it is closed down, after which he frequents McGinty's)
- Durer's – Sherlock Holmes and the Secret Weapon
- Dwight's Bar – Burlesque

== E ==
- The Earl Of Osbourne – Inn for Trouble (1960)
- Earhart's – Officer's club on Babylon 5, located in the titular station's Red Sector
- Eden Hall – Bartender (manga)
- El Pequeño Cocinero - Grand Theft Auto: Vice City Stories (2005)
- El Quebrados Lounge - Grand Theft Auto: San Andreas (2004)
- Electric Psychedelic Pussycat Swingers Club – Austin Powers: International Man of Mystery
- The Elephant (London, 1599) – Doctor Who, episode "The Shakespeare Code"
- Elfsong Tavern – Baldur's Gate: Dark Alliance
- The Eolian – The Kingkiller Chronicle
- Essence – Parks and Recreation, episode "Two Parties"
- Esther's Magic Bean – Hollyoaks

== F ==
- The Famous Cock – The World's End (2013): The third of 12 pubs on the "golden mile" pub crawl
- Fangtasia – True Blood (2008)
- The Feathers – Dad's Army
- The Feathers – The Royle Family
- The Feed Bag – The Elder Scrolls IV: Oblivion
- The Feisty Goat Pub – Eurotrip
- Fellas – Grand Theft Auto III (2001)
- The First Post – The World's End (2013): The first of 12 pubs on the "golden mile" pub crawl
- Fitzgerald's – Ballykissangel
- The Five Claws Lodge – The Elder Scrolls IV: Oblivion
- Flanagan's Cocktails & Dreams – Cocktail
- Flanahan's Hole – Community, episode "Mixology Certification"
- The Flap and Throttle – Cabin Pressure (radio series)
- The Flowers of Gold – The Elder Scrolls III: Morrowind
- The Flowing Bowl – The Elder Scrolls IV: Oblivion
- The Flying Horse – Coronation Street's other pub
- The Flying Peacock – From a soundcheck track, "The Ballad of Rustie Lee" by Dumpy's Rusty Nuts: "the guys all rock, down the Flying Peacock"
- The Flying Swan – The Brentford Trilogy by Robert Rankin
- The Foaming Flask – The Elder Scrolls IV: Oblivion
- Foley's – Mrs. Brown's Boys
- Fort Carson Bar - Grand Theft Auto: San Andreas (2004)
- Fool and Bladder – Sir Henry at Rawlinson End
- Founding Fathers – Bones
- Four Shields Tavern – The Elder Scrolls V: Skyrim
- Free the Paedos – Super Hans' suggested pub name in Peep Show
- Friendsy's – Seeking a Friend for the End of the World
- Frostfruit Inn – The Elder Scrolls V: Skyrim
- The Frozen Hearth – The Elder Scrolls V: Skyrim
- Fuller's – Operation Good Guys

== G ==
- Gallow's End Tavern – World of Warcraft
- The Garrison – Peaky Blinders
- Gary's Old Towne Tavern – rival bar to Cheers
- Gaston's – Beauty and the Beast (1991)
- The Gates of Hell – Bayonetta
- Gateway Inn – The Elder Scrolls III: Morrowind
- The Gentleman Loser – Neuromancer by William Gibson; name comes from the track "Midnite Cruiser" on the 1972 Steely Dan album Can't Buy a Thrill
- The George III – Rip Van Winkle by Washington Irving; changed its name to the George Washington Hotel after 1776
- Glenister's – Life on Mars (U.S. version); a "cop bar" named in tribute to Philip Glenister of the original version
- The Globe and Anchor – Heartbreak Ridge (1986)
- The Goat and Compasses – Dad's Army
- The Goat and Compasses, Fitzrovia – Framley Parsonage, Chapter 32; Sowerby goes there to meet the debt collector Tom Tozer
- The Gold Room at the Overlook Hotel – The Shining by Stephen King and the 1980 film adaptation
- The Golden Lion – Doc Martin
- The Golden Perch – The Lord of the Rings
- Golden Pheasant – The Private Life of Don Juan
- The Good Companions – The World's End (film) (2013): The fifth of 12 pubs on the "golden mile" pub crawl
- The Granville – Operation Good Guys
- The Grapes – Early Doors
- The Grasshopper – The Titfield Thunderbolt
- Gray's Bar – Cougar Town
- Greely's – Unforgiven (1992)
- The Green Dragon in Hobbiton – The Lord of the Rings
- The Green Man – The Wicker Man
- The Greyhound – World Shut Your Mouth
- The Grey Mare – The Elder Scrolls IV: Oblivion
- The Griffin – New Girl, the bar was previously called "Clyde's Bar" in the early seasons.
- Grilby's – Undertale

== H ==
- The Hand & Racquet, East Cheam – Hancock's Half Hour
- The Hand of Glory – A Canterbury Tale (1944)
- The Hanged Man – Dragon Age II
- The Hanged Man - Harry Potter and the Goblet of Fire (2000)
- Hangman's Knot – Dick Tracy Meets Gruesome
- Happy's Place - Happy's Place
- Harry Hope's Saloon – The Iceman Cometh, 1939 play by Eugene O'Neill
- Harvelle's Roadhouse - Supernatural
- The Herald's Rest – Dragon Age: Inquisition
- Hi-Men - Grand Theft Auto V (2013)
- The Hip Joint – Futurama (1999)
- The Hog's Head – a pub in the Harry Potter series
- The Hole In The Wall – The World's End (film) (2013): The eleventh of 12 pubs on the "golden mile" pub crawl
- The Horse & Groom, Cottington – Arthur Dent's local in The Hitchhiker's Guide to the Galaxy
- The Hound Pits Pub – Dishonored

== I ==
- The Icon – Doctors
- Inn of Ill Omen – The Elder Scrolls IV: Oblivion
- Inn of the Last Home – Dragonlance
- The Intersection – How I Met Your Mother, episode "Challenge Accepted"
- The Iron Horse – Freaks and Geeks
- The Ivy Bush – in the Westfarthing of the Shire, in JRR Tolkien's The Lord of the Rings

== J ==
- Jack Rabbit Slim's – Pulp Fiction
- Jack's Crocodile Bar – "Where deals are made over a beer and a bite." – "American Gods"
- Jenny's – Still Game (the renamed Clansman, although still referred to as The Clansman by the regulars)
- Jerkov's - Grand Theft Auto IV
- Jimmy's Bar – Detroit: Become Human
- The Jockey – Shameless
- Joe's – Grey's Anatomy
- Joe's Bar - Déjà Vu
- John McRory's Place – Leverage, the bar downstairs from Nate's apartment

== K ==
- Kadie's Club Pecos – Sin City, a series of neo-noir comics by Frank Miller
- Kavanagh's Irish Pub – The Wire
- The Kebab & Calculator – The Young Ones (1982)
- Kelcy's – All in the Family (1971–1979)
- Kennedy's – Scarlett
- The King and Queen Tavern – The Elder Scrolls IV: Oblivion
- The King's Head – The World's End (film) (2013): The tenth of 12 pubs on the "golden mile" pub crawl
- The King of Prussia – Emmerdale

== L ==
- The Lamb & Flag – Bottom (1991–1995)
- The Last Chance Saloon – The Rifleman
- The Last Resort – Total Recall (1990)
- The Leaky Cauldron – a public house in the Harry Potter series and the entryway into Diagon Alley in London
- The Learned Goat – Bone Tomahawk
- Levy's – Lady in the Lake
- Lil' Probe'Inn – Grand Theft Auto: San Andreas
- The Limping Whippet — The Beiderbecke Trilogy
- The Lobo – Roseanne
- The Lock – Family Affairs
- The Lock – Lock, Stock...
- The Loft – Hollyoaks
- The Long Branch Saloon – Gunsmoke
- The Lord Nelson – Mongrels
- The Lost Lady Saloon – The Outlaw Josey Wales
- Louie's – TaleSpin
- Low Point – How I Met Your Mother, episode "How Your Mother Met Me"
- Lucky Winkles - Grand Theft Auto IV (2008)
- Lucky Lockup – The Elder Scrolls III: Morrowind
- Lusty Leopard – How I Met Your Mother
- LUX – Lucifer

== M ==
- Maccadam's Old Oil House – Transformers franchise
- MacLaren's Pub – How I Met Your Mother (2005)
- MacLaren's Pub (East Side) – How I Met Your Mother, episode "How Your Mother Met Me"
- Mad Dog Saloon – Bill & Ted's Excellent Adventure
- Mahoney's – Frasier (2023)
- The Maidenhead – Serenity (2005)
- The Malt Shovel – formerly the other pub in Emmerdale
- Martinis - It's a Wonderful Life (1946)
- McAnally's – The Dresden Files, a series of contemporary fantasy/mystery novels written by Jim Butcher
- McCoy's – Fair City, Long running Irish soap opera set in Dublin
- McGinty's – Boondock Saints (1999)
- McGinty's – Early Edition (1996)
- McGinty's – Frasier (Martin Crane's hangout after Duke's pub is closed down)
- McKenna's – Lou Grant, ground floor bar and restaurant in the Los Angeles Tribune building. In one episode, its owner was played by Rue McClanahan.
- Meibeyer's – The Pale King, 2011 novel by David Foster Wallace
- Merlotte's Bar and Grill – True Blood
- The Mermaid – The World's End (film) (2013): The eighth of 12 pubs on the "golden mile" pub crawl
- The Mellow Tiger - Needful Things by Stephen King
- Mesmer Club – The Woman in Green
- Mickey Finn's Palace – Way Out West
- Midnight Bell – 20,000 Streets Under the Sky by Patrick Hamilton
- The Midnight Star – Silverado (1985)
- Milk – The L Word
- Misty's – Grand Theft Auto San Andreas
- Mr. Pubbs – Cheers, episode "The Beer is Always Greener"
- Moe's Tavern – The Simpsons
- The Mohune Arms – Moonfleet, by J. Meade Faulkner
- Mojito Inn - Grand Theft Auto V (2013)
- Molly's – in three different US television series including Chicago Fire
- The Monkey Bar – Tales of the Gold Monkey
- The Moon Under Water – "The Moon Under Water", 1946 essay by George Orwell
- The Moonrakers – Hobson's Choice
- Mos Eisley cantina, aka "Chalmun's Cantina" – the bar in Star Wars Episode IV: A New Hope
- The Mucky Duck – Man About The House
- Muggy's – Fangirl, novel by Rainbow Rowell
- Mulberry Street Bar – The Godfather Part III
- Munden's Bar – Grimjack (comic)
- The Mayhew – Two Pints of Lager and a Packet of Crisps (2001)
- Mystic Grill – The Vampire Diaries

== N ==
- The Nag's Head – Only Fools and Horses
- Neptune's – Benidorm
- New Found Out – Being Human'
- New York Bar (atop the Park Hyatt Tokyo) – Lost in Translation (2003)
- Night Spot – Torchwood, episode "Day One"
- Noah's Bar – Home and Away

== O ==
- The Oak and Crosier – The Elder Scrolls IV: Oblivion
- The Oblivion Bar – DC Comics; exists in a hidden pocket dimension of magic
- Occidental Private Club – The Blue Lotus by Hergé
- Ol' Souris – Transformice
- The Old Familiar – The World's End (2013): The second of 12 pubs on the "golden mile" pub crawl
- The Old Haunt – Castle
- The Old Phoenix – A Midsummer Tempest
- The Old Pink Dog – So Long and Thanks for All the Fish by Douglas Adams
- The Ox and Lamb – Star Trek: Voyager: 'Fair Haven' – the little Irish pub in the holodeck
- Old Prospector Saloon – Fallout: New Vegas
- The Orange Tree – Teachers (2004)
- O'Malley's – "Escape", 1979 song by Rupert Holmes
- O'Malley's Bar – 1996 song of the same name by Nick Cave and the Bad Seeds, on their 9th studio album Murder Ballads
- The Overlook Hotel - The Shining by Stephen King

== P ==
- P3 – Charmed
- Paddy's Pub – It's Always Sunny in Philadelphia
- Palace Saloon (1885) – Back to the Future Part III (1990)
- Paradise Club – Dick Tracy (1945)
- The Peacock – Tom Brown's School Days. An Inn at Islington, London from where Tom catches a coach on his first trip to Rugby
- The Peacock -- Pickwick Papers. Inn at Eatanswill
- Pitchers on Vinewood - Grand Theft Auto V (2013)
- The Pit Stop - Talladega Nights: The Ballad of Ricky Bobby 2006
- The Pig and Whistle – World of Warcraft
- Pipeline Inn - Grand Theft Auto V (2013)
- The Pilgrim's Rest – The Elder Scrolls III: Morrowind
- The Place – The Big Time, a short 1958 sci-fi novel by Fritz Leiber
- Playaz Club – 1994 song of the same title by Rappin' 4-Tay, on his second album Don't Fight the Feelin'
- The Plot and Plaster – The Elder Scrolls III: Morrowind
- The Plumbers' Arms – Teachers (2001–2003)
- Poison – Arrow, episode "Lone Gunmen"
- The Poison Apple – Shrek 2
- The Pool Hall (Pleasure Island) – Pinocchio (1940)
- Poor Richard's – American version of The Office
- The Prancing Pony – The Lord of the Rings
- The Punch Tavern – Oblivion by Anthony Horowitz
- The Purple Pit – Cinderfella with Jerry Lewis
- Puzzles – How I Met Your Mother

== Q ==
- Quark's – Star Trek: Deep Space Nine
- The Queen Victoria – EastEnders
- The Queen's Haemorrhoids – Jabberwocky (1977)

== R ==
- The Rabennest (Raven's Nest) – Wolfenstein
- Radical - The Amazing Digital Circus, episode "Untitled"
- The Ragged Flagon – The Elder Scrolls V: Skyrim (a den of thieves)
- The Railway Arms – Life on Mars
- The Rat in the Pot – The Elder Scrolls III: Morrowind
- The Raven – Marion Ravenwood's bar in Nepal in Raiders of the Lost Ark of the Indiana Jones franchise
- The Red Boot Pub – Grounded for Life
- The Red Lion - Dad's Army
- The Red Pony – Longmire
- Red Lobster Inn – Pinocchio
- The Regal Beagle – Three's Company
- Rick's Café Américain – Casablanca
- The Rising Sun – Merlin (BBC TV series)
- Rolliver's Inn – Tess of the d'Urbervilles by Thomas Hardy
- Romanoff's – The Little Sister by Raymond Chandler
- The Rooster Bar – The Rooster Bar by John Grisham
- The Rose & Crown (London, 1892) – Doctor Who, episode "The Snowmen"
- The Rose & Thorn – The Riyria Chronicles
- Rosie's Bar – M*A*S*H
- Roulette (Metropolis) – Smallville, episode "Roulette"
- Rovers Return Inn – Coronation Street
- Rowlf's Tavern – The Muppets
- The Royal Barge – Bergerac
- The Rusty Anchor – The Golden Girls

== S ==
- Sailors Arms – Under Milk Wood
- St. Elmo's Bar – St. Elmo's Fire (1985)
- Salieri's Bar – Mafia: The City of Lost Heaven
- Salty Sailor Tavern – World of Warcraft
- Salty Spitoon – SpongeBob SquarePants
- Samoan Joe's – Lock, Stock and Two Smoking Barrels (1998)
- Sandbox – How I Met Your Mother
- Sazerac Saloon – Virginia City (1940)
- The Scarecrow and Mrs King – Daffyd Thomas sketches in Little Britain
- Scarlet Raven Tavern – World of Warcraft
- Seagrass – Arrow, episode "Muse of Fire"
- The Shakespeare – Being Human, Being Human novels
- Shamrock Taphouse – Fallout 4
- Shark Pool - Heartbreak High
- Shenanigan's Bar - Grand Theft Auto V (2013)
- Shooters – Melrose Place
- The Silent Woman – The Scarecrow of Romney Marsh, Disney TV miniseries starring Patrick McGoohan (1963); episode 1 and 3
- Silver-Blood Inn – Skyrim
- Silverclub – The Saint in New York (1938)
- The Silver Dollar Saloon – Bonanza
- Singleton's - Grand Theft Auto V (2013)
- The Siren – Gotham
- The Six Jolly Fellowship Porters – Our Mutual Friend, by Charles Dickens
- The Skinners Arms – Steptoe and Son
- The Slaughtered Lamb – An American Werewolf in London (1981)
- The Slaughtered Prince – Stardust (2007)
- Sleeping Giant Inn – Skyrim
- The Sleeping Mare Inn – The Elder Scrolls IV: Oblivion
- The Smack – Rapscallion by James McGee
- The Smash Club – Full House and Fuller House
- Snakehole Lounge – Parks and Recreation, episode "Telethon"
- The Snake Pit (aka Taffy's Place) – Blade Runner (1982)
- Snooky's Bar - WKRP in Cincinnati
- The Snug – Life on Mars (U.S. version)
- The Snuggly Duckling – Tangled
- The Spotted Dog – Game On
- The Stagger Inn _ Big Driver, (Full Dark, No Stars )', Stephen King
- The Stardrop Saloon - Stardew Valley
- Starlight Roof, The Green Lantern – The Long Goodbye, by Raymond Chandler
- Steinway Beer Garden – Grand Theft Auto IV
- Stonefire Tavern – World of Warcraft
- Stone's Throw/Scorched Bone/Setting Sun – A Darker Shade of Magic by V.E. Schwab
- Strokes – EastEnders
- SU Bar – Hollyoaks
- The Ship – Scarborough
- The Swan – Jez's proposed pub name in Peep Show (filmed at the Mitre, Hackney)
- The Swan & Paedo – a compromise proposal, in Peep Show
- Swerve's - The Transformers: More than Meets the Eye (Comic Series)

== T ==
- Tabard – The Canterbury Tales by Geoffrey Chaucer
- Table Salt – Arrow, episode "Vendetta"
- The Tall Ship – River City
- Tavern – Over the Garden Wall (2014 miniseries)
- Tavern of Time – World of Warcraft
- Ten Forward – Star Trek: The Next Generation
- Ten Green Bottles – Grand Theft Auto: San Andreas
- Tequi-la-la - Grand Theft Auto V (2013)
- The Third Rail – Fallout 4
- The Three Cripples – Oliver Twist
- The Thorax Bar (Society) – Gamer (2009)
- The Three Broomsticks – Harry Potter series
- The Three Sisters' Inn – The Elder Scrolls IV: Oblivion
- The Time In A Bottle – DC Comics; a London pub which all British superheroes and villains recognise as neutral territory. Frequented by Knight
- Thirsty's - George Lopez
- Thunderbrew Distillery – World of Warcraft
- Tigh Thaidhg – Ros na Rún
- Turk's Head – The Great Garrick
- Titty Typhoon – Danganronpa 2: Goodbye Despair
- Torchy's – Streets of Fire (1984)
- Trees Lounge – Trees Lounge
- The Trusty Servant – The World's End (2013): The sixth of 12 pubs on the "golden mile" pub crawl
- The Two-Headed Dog – The World's End (2013): The seventh of 12 pubs on the "golden mile" pub crawl

== U ==
- The Ullswater Hotel – The Lakes
- Underworld Tavern – Deus Ex

== V ==
- Vardi's – The Big Sleep, by Raymond Chandler
- The Venusville Bar – Total Recall (1990)
- Verdant – Arrow (2012)
- Very Cool Secret Bar – How I Met Your Mother, episode "The Lighthouse"
- The Vigilante – Citizen Smith
- Volpe's – Mean Streets (1973)
- The Vulgar Unicorn – Thieves' World

== W ==
- The Wakeley Arms – Straw Dogs
- Walhalla – The Lady from Shanghai
- The Wandering Company – A Fire Upon the Deep, by Vernor Vinge
- Wandin Valley RSL – A Country Practice
- The Warsaw—The Drew Carey Show
- Weatherfield Arms (known as the "Weathy Arms") – Coronation Street
- Weeb's Sports Grill – Full House
- Welsh's Bar – The Deer Hunter (1978)
- West Weald Inn – The Elder Scrolls IV: Oblivion
- The Waterhole - Neighbours
- The Whippet Inn – Carry On at Your Convenience
- The White Hart – How Do You Want Me?
- The White Hart – Tales from the White Hart, by Arthur C. Clarke
- The White Hart – The Anti-Death League, by Kingsley Amis
- The White Horse – Last of the Summer Wine
- White Stallionz Bar - Grand Theft Auto: Vice City (2002)
- The White Swan – Man About the House
- The Winchester Tavern – Shaun of the Dead (2004)
- The Winchester Club – Minder
- Windpeak Inn – Skyrim
- The Winking Skeever – Skyrim (A skeever is a kind of large rat within the game.)
- Woody's Topless Bar – Grand Theft Auto III (2001)
- The Woolpack – Emmerdale
- World's End Tavern – World of Warcraft
- The World's End – The World's End (film) (2013): The twelfth and last of 12 pubs on the "golden mile" pub crawl, where the climactic scenes of the film's story play out
- Wurstbraterei – Tatort

== Y ==
- Y Deri Arms – Pobol y Cwm (1974)
- The Yellow Flag – Black Lagoon
- Yellow Jack Inn – Grand Theft Auto V (2013)

== See also ==
- List of public house topics
- List of real London pubs in literature
