= London Blues =

1997 novel by Anthony Frewin

- First edition
- Author: Anthony Frewin
- Language: English
- Genre: Mystery, Crime novel
- Publisher: No Exit Press
- Publication date: 1997
- Publication place: England
- Media type: Print (Paperback)
- Pages: 304 pp (first edition paperback)
- ISBN: 1-874061-73-4 (first edition paperback)
- OCLC: 39073168

London Blues is a novel by Anthony Frewin first published in 1997 about Soho in the late 1950s and early 1960s and in particular about the early days of pornographic movie production in Britain. London Blues is a mystery novel in that it describes not just the dangerous life but also the disappearance of a young photographer in the wake of the Profumo affair.

== Plot summary ==
Tim Purdom is born in 1937 in a small village on the Kentish coast as the illegitimate son of a young woman who dies in her early forties. After her death in 1959, Purdom decides to move to London as he does not have any sense of belonging to his home town any more. He finds cheap accommodation in Bayswater and work in a snack bar in Soho. Purdom is not only a jazz fanatic (his favourite musician is Thelonious Monk) but also an intellectual who reads books and who is interested in what is going on in the world, both politically and culturally. His intellectual pursuits do not go together with his lifestyle or his job. However, without any formal education or money, he is reduced to the kind of life he is leading; but, unambitious by nature, he is quite content with it for the time being.

Very early during his stay in London Purdom is confronted with petty crime through his contact with guests and workmates. When he is offered some extra money by one of the older regulars he tags along with him and suddenly finds himself in a place where "dirty pictures"—which were illegal at the time—are taken. He is then approached by the owner of some adult bookshops and encouraged to become a pornographic photographer himself. The customers like his pictures, which are sold under the counter, and Purdom makes some good money.

He is initiated into the world of private parties where old blue movies of foreign origin are shown to middle-aged upper middle class men in the company of young, attractively made up women. At one of those parties, where he works as the projectionist, he meets a man who later turns out to be Stephen Ward, one of the key figures in what will later be referred to as the Profumo affair. Ward supplies Purdom with a good many "models" for his photographic sessions. Eventually Purdom buys an 8 mm amateur movie camera and starts shooting pornographic movie shorts himself.

His short-lived career is already over in early 1963 when he is told by his employer that the industry has moved on and that cheap Scandinavian imports are now in demand, which are also in colour rather than black and white. Purdom keeps on working at the snack bar and in addition is commissioned to do some serious photography about London for foreign magazines. He has become a respectable citizen with a new girlfriend who does not know anything about the shady business he has left behind. It is then that he feels he is being haunted by his past.

== Publication ==
In an interview, Frewin said about finding a publisher for London Blues, his first novel: "Simon & Schuster were going to go with it but they got cold feet. Nobody really understood it, and I almost gave up trying to get it published. I think the feeling was that it wasn't in a clearly defined genre—it had too many literary pretensions for a sexy thriller, and for a literary novel it was too thrillerish. They felt it was neither fish nor fowl. Most publishers are into genre publishing and they're very conservative."

London Blues was eventually published in 1997 by No Exit Press.

== See also ==
- London in fiction
