= Hancock's Wharf =

Coordinates: 42°21′48″N 71°02′55″W

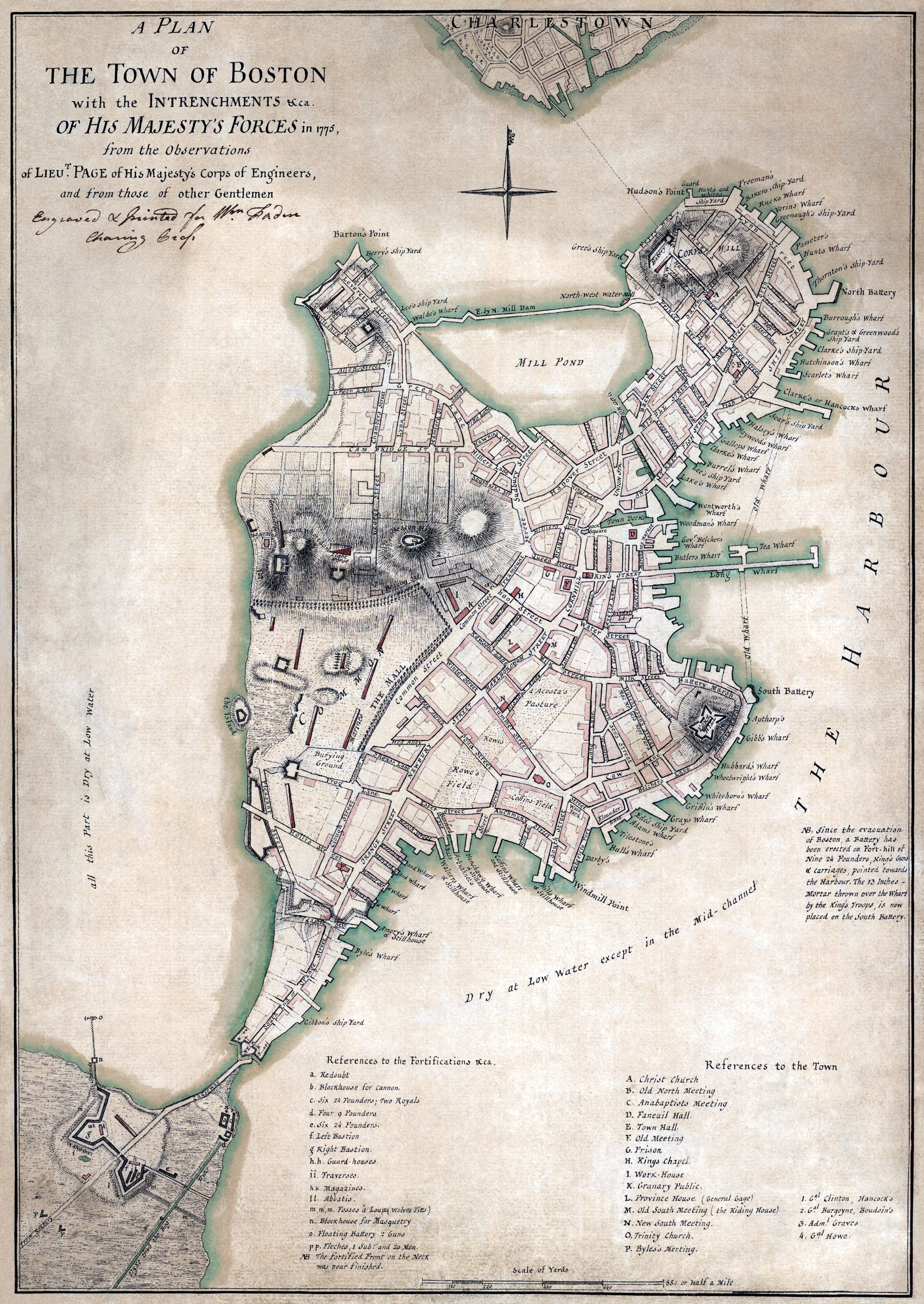
Map of the city of Boston (1775), showing the position of Hancock's Wharf at the North-East, between Long Wharf and North Battery.

Hancock's Wharf was a dock on the waterfront of Boston, Massachusetts in the 1700s, owned by John Hancock, and previously his uncle, Thomas Hancock. Hancock's Wharf began from near the foot of Fleet Street and the junction of Fish and Ship Streets. Both of the latter streets are now roughly the present-day Commercial Street. This wharf figures prominently in the early setting of Johnny Tremain, a Newbery Award-winning novel by Esther Forbes.
