= Anthony Frewin =

British writer and personal assistant (born 1947)

- Born: Anthony Edward Frewin; 1947 (age 78–79); Kentish Town, London, England
- Occupations: Writer, personal assistant
- Children: 1

Anthony Edward Frewin (born 1947) is a British writer and erstwhile personal assistant to film director Stanley Kubrick (from 1965 to 1968, and from 1979 to 1999). Frewin now represents the Stanley Kubrick Estate. His novel London Blues has been described as "masterful".

== Personal life ==
Anthony Edward Frewin and his brother Mark David Frewin are the sons of Edward Albert Frewin (1921–1982) and Ruby Jean Weeks (1924-2007, m. 1944). Frewin's ex-partner is Charlene Page, and they have a son, Nick Frewin (b. 1971).

== Credits ==
=== Novels ===
- London Blues, No Exit Press (1994) ISBN 1-874061-73-4
- Sixty-Three Closure (1996)
- Scorpian Rising: A Seaside Noir [sic] (1997)
- The Reich Stuff (2008)
- The Count of Comedy, or Teddy Taylor and the Great Past He Has in Front of Him (2013)
- The Lion of Canterbury: The Last Armed Uprising in England (2019)

=== Non-fiction ===
- One Hundred Years of Science Fiction Illustration 1840-1940 (1974)
- The Book of Days (1971)
- Elstree & Boreham Wood through two thousand years (1974)
- The assassination of John F. Kennedy: an annotated film, TV, and videography, 1963-1992 Issue 8 of Bibliographies and indexes in mass media and communications, Publisher Greenwood Press, 1993, ISBN 0313289824, 9780313289828, 170 pages.

=== Parodies ===
- The Secret Library of Georges Armoulian: Being an Annotated Catalogue of Bizarre, Curious, Suppressed and Outrageous Books, Amongst which there are Association Copies, Limited Editions, Fine Bindings, Private Press Titles, & Similar (2012)

=== Articles ===
- What Stanley didn't say, The Guardian, Saturday 20 November 2004
- Contributor to Lobster magazine on the JFK assassination

=== Film (writer) ===
- Colour Me Kubrick (2005)
- What is Out There? Segment on the Blu-ray release of 2001: A Space Odyssey (2007)
- Anthropoid (2016)

=== Film (assistant) ===
- 1999 Eyes Wide Shut (assistant: Stanley Kubrick)
- 1987 Full Metal Jacket (assistant to producer)
- 1980 The Shining (assistant: Stanley Kubrick—uncredited)
- 1971 A Clockwork Orange (assistant: Stanley Kubrick—uncredited)
- 1968 2001: A Space Odyssey (assistant: Mr. Kubrick—uncredited)

=== Film (associate producer) ===
- Stanley Kubrick: A Life in Pictures
