= Mojo Record Bar =

Independent record store and bar in Sydney, Australia

Mojo Record Bar is an independent record store and bar in Sydney, Australia, founded by Daniel McManus and Jon Ruttan in 2012 and designed by Bianca Mignone
