= The Buddha of Suburbia =

The Buddha of Suburbia may refer to:

- The Buddha of Suburbia (novel), a 1990 novel by Hanif Kureishi
- The Buddha of Suburbia (TV serial), a 1993 BBC television series based on the book
- The Buddha of Suburbia (album), a 1993 studio album by David Bowie partially inspired by the above television series
  - "The Buddha of Suburbia" (song), a single released from the soundtrack album
