= The Buddha of Suburbia (album) =

1993 studio album by David Bowie

Studio album / soundtrack album by David Bowie
- Released: 8 November 1993
- Recorded: August 1993
- Studio: Mountain (Montreux, Switzerland); O'Henry (Burbank, California)
- Genre: Rock; pop; ambient; jazz; experimental
- Length: 55:26
- Label: Arista
- Producer: David Bowie; David Richards

David Bowie chronology
Black Tie White Noise (1993)	The Buddha of Suburbia (1993)	The Singles Collection (1993)

Alternative cover
- 2007 reissue cover

Singles from The Buddha of Suburbia
- 1. "The Buddha of Suburbia" Released: 22 November 1993

The Buddha of Suburbia is the nineteenth studio album (Note: The Buddha of Suburbia was initially marketed as a soundtrack album rather than a studio album. In his book The Complete David Bowie, Nicholas Pegg lists Buddha as a studio album, as do other biographers and latter-day reviewers. Bowie's official website also includes Buddha with the rest of his discography. Nevertheless, a 2016 article by the BBC presenting all of Bowie's studio albums did not include Buddha.) by the English musician David Bowie, originally released on 8 November 1993 through Arista Records in the United Kingdom and Europe. The project originated following an interview between Bowie and the novelist Hanif Kureishi during a press tour for Black Tie White Noise (1993), where Bowie agreed to compose music for an upcoming adaptation of Kureishi's novel The Buddha of Suburbia (1990). After making basic tracks, Bowie decided to turn the project into a full album. Working with the musician Erdal Kızılçay, recording took place at Mountain Studios in Montreux, Switzerland, and was completed in six days; Mike Garson contributed piano overdubs.

The album's music primarily consists of numerous motifs created using various instruments and contain references to his late-1970s works. Commentators recognised rock, pop, ambient, jazz and experimental themes throughout. The music itself bears little resemblance to the music of the BBC serial; only the title track featured in the programme. Aside from three instrumentals, the lyrics are non-linear, which Bowie utilised as a way to reduce narrative form.

Initially marketed as a soundtrack album, The Buddha of Suburbia flopped and received little promotion from Bowie himself, despite receiving positive reviews from British critics. It was not released in the United States until October 1995 through Virgin Records with updated artwork. It fell back into obscurity until a worldwide reissue through EMI in 2007, although it still remains one of Bowie's least-known works. Nevertheless, reviewers have praised The Buddha of Suburbia as a forgotten gem in his catalogue. Bowie himself named it his favourite album in 2003. A remastered version was released in 2021 as part of the box set Brilliant Adventure (1992–2001).

== Conception and recording ==
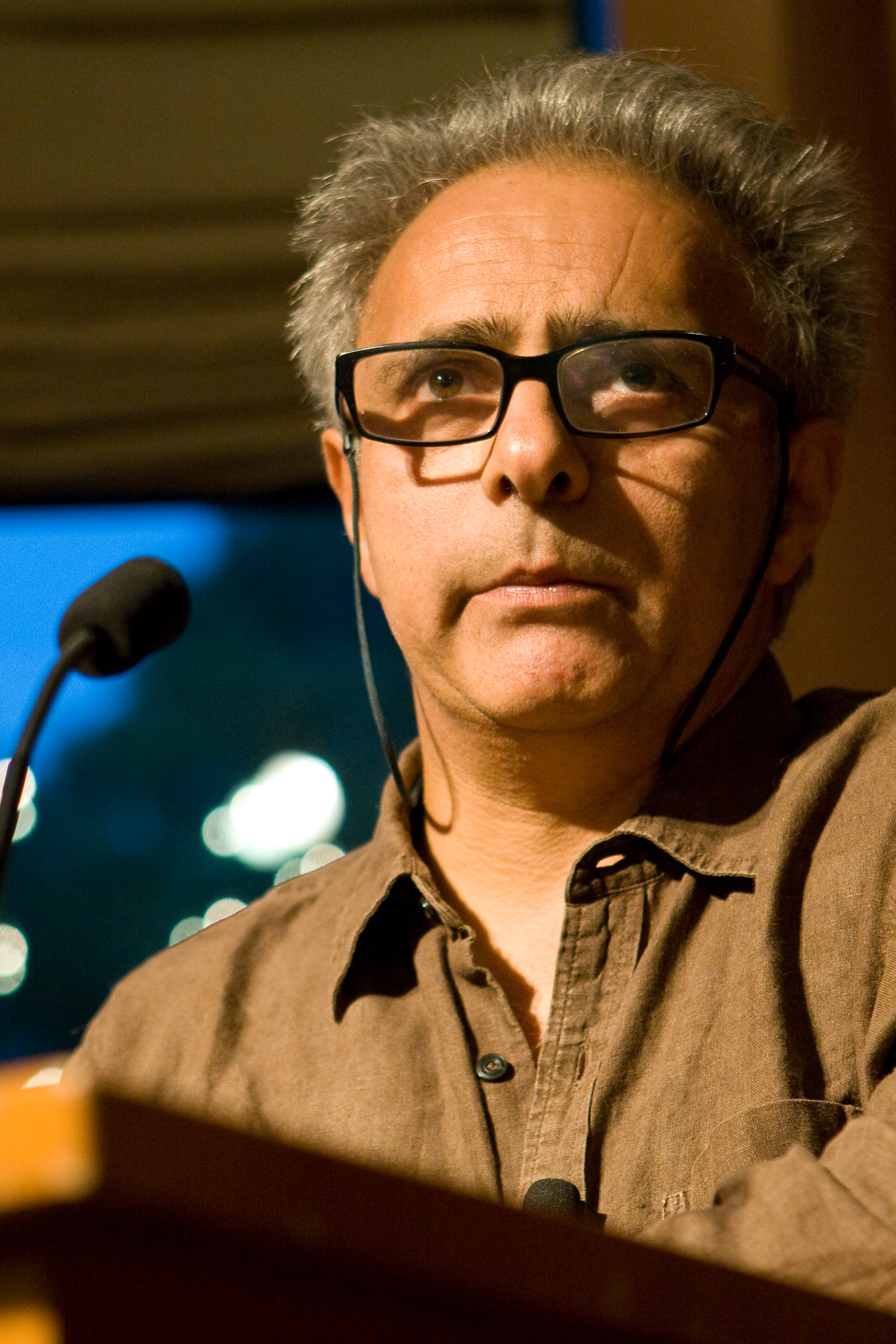
The Buddha of Suburbia began as a soundtrack for an adaptation of the 1990 novel of the same name, written by Hanif Kureishi (pictured in 2008).

While promoting his then-upcoming album Black Tie White Noise in February 1993, David Bowie spoke with the British novelist Hanif Kureishi for Interview magazine. Kureishi sought permission to use some of Bowie's older material (Note: Including "Changes", "Fill Your Heart" (both 1971) and "Time" (1973).) for an upcoming adaptation of his 1990 novel The Buddha of Suburbia. The novel, about a teenage boy named Karim attempting to be an actor in the 1970s, featured a character named Charlie who becomes embroiled with the rock star life. The biographer Nicholas Pegg describes Charlie as an amalgamation of Bowie, Sid Vicious and Billy Idol. Feeling the novel "reminded [him] of his own youth", Bowie agreed to compose the music and months later, Kureishi and the serial's director Roger Michell ventured to Switzerland to investigate Bowie's progress. According to Pegg, Bowie had completed close to 40 pieces by the early summer of 1993. Kureishi suggested revisions, after which Bowie decided to turn the project into a new album—what Chris O'Leary calls a "quasi-soundtrack". Speaking with the journalist Dylan Jones, Kureishi stated: "[Bowie] said he wanted to write some songs for it because he wanted to make some money out of it."

The album was recorded and mixed at Mountain Studios in Montreux, Switzerland, and co-produced by Bowie and David Richards, (Note: O'Leary lists Bowie and Kızılçay as co-producers.) who previously co-produced Never Let Me Down (1987). According to Bowie, it took only six days to write and record, but fifteen days to mix because of some "technical breakdowns". For the album, Bowie worked with the Turkish musician Erdal Kızılçay, his former collaborator on numerous 1980s projects. The two watched the serial repeatedly while making the album, with Kızılçay recalling that the album came from the stories they told one another while making it, as well as the connections Bowie had with Kureishi. In 2003, Bowie recalled that he felt "very happy" during the making of the record. Kızılçay later told the author Paul Trynka: "Something happened for that album. There wasn't a big budget; David explained the story before we started. It was a challenge, it was a small budget, but David just said, 'Let's go, let's do it,' and everything worked." The pianist Mike Garson, who had recently reunited with Bowie on Black Tie White Noise, overdubbed piano parts for two tracks ("South Horizon" and "Bleed Like a Craze, Dad") in a single three-hour session at O'Henry Sound Studios in Burbank, California.

== Music and lyrics ==
I took each theme or motif from the play and initially stretched or lengthened it to a five or six-minute duration. Then, having noted which musical key I was in and having counted the number of bars, I would often pull down the faders leaving just the percussive element with no harmonic informations to refer to. Working in layers I would then build up reinforcements in the key of the composition, totally blind so to speak. When all faders were pushed up again a number of clashes would make themselves evident. The more dangerous or attractive ones would then be isolated and repeated ...

—David Bowie on his working methods for the album

According to O'Leary, the music Bowie made for The Buddha of Suburbia consisted of short "motifs – combinations of guitar, synthesiser, trumpet, percussion, [and] sitar". In the extensive liner notes for the album, Bowie stated that the collection "bears little resemblance to the small instrumentation of the BBC play". He also presented a list of influences that he drew from when creating it, including the Beach Boys' Pet Sounds (1966), Roxy Music, T. Rex, Neu!, Kraftwerk and Brian Eno.

Reviewers have recognised numerous references to Bowie's 1970s works, with AllMusic's William Ruhlmann naming The Man Who Sold the World (1970), Aladdin Sane (1973) and Low (1977). The Guardian's Mark Hooper considered Buddha "a gloriously experimental mish-mash of 70s influences", while Julian Marszalek of The Quietus found a mix of "glam, jazz, funk, ambient soundscapes and pop".

Biographers have similarly observed the presence of pop, jazz, ambient, experimental and rock material. Aside from the three instrumental tracks, Pegg considers the album's lyrics "non-linear", which he believes suggests an adoption of the working methods of Eno, who Bowie listed as an influence in the liner notes. Bowie stated that he used "great dollops of pastiche and quasi-narrative" when crafting the lyrics as a way to reduce proper narrative form, which he considered "redundant".

=== Songs ===
The title track was written as a pastiche of Bowie's early 1970s sound. It contains musical and lyrical references to his past compositions "Space Oddity" (1969), "All the Madmen" (1970) and "The Bewlay Brothers" (1971). Lyrically, it primarily follows Kureishi's novel and was the only track to actually appear in the BBC serial. "Sex and the Church" uses a beat similar to "Pallas Athena" from Black Tie White Noise, which Buckley compares to the music of Prince. Pegg states that the two themes present throughout Kureishi's novel—sexuality and spirituality—combine to form the theme of "Sex and the Church". Bowie's vocals are distorted using a vocoder while the track ends with a sequence similar to Aladdin Sane's "The Jean Genie". "South Horizon" is an avant-garde jazz instrumental that Pegg believes foreshadows the experimental tracks found on Bowie's next album Outside (1995). Bowie said that "all elements, from lead instrumentation to texture, were played both forwards and backwards. The resulting extracts were then intercut arbitrarily". It was his favourite track on the album.

The album's longest track, "The Mysteries", is an ambient instrumental piece evocative of Bowie's Berlin Trilogy. Featuring various electronic sounds and synthesiser loops, Bowie stated that "the original tape was slowed down, opening up the thick texture dramatically and then Erdal would play thematic information against it". "Bleed Like a Craze, Dad" features contributions from the trio 3D Echo (Rob Clydesdale, Gary Taylor, Isaac Daniel Prevost), who were recording an EP at Mountain at the same time Bowie was. He almost raps during one section, which Buckley compares to his vocal on Lodger's "African Night Flight" (1979); Pegg also mentions the presence of "Lodger-style percussion" with Robert Fripp-type guitar licks. (Note: Fripp played lead guitar on both "Heroes" (1977) and Scary Monsters (1980).) "Strangers When We Meet" uses a sound akin to the late-1970s works of Roxy Music with a guitar riff from the Spencer Davis Group's "Gimme Some Lovin'" (1966). Pegg calls it one of the album's "more conventional" tracks, featuring impressionist lyrics about the beginning of a relationship. O'Leary describes it as "tense, compact and nerv[y]". Bowie rerecorded the track for Outside.

"Dead Against It" is evocative of various New York new wave bands from the late 1970s. O'Leary finds the lyric "clotted with internal rhymes and consonance". Bowie considered rerecording the song during the sessions for Outside and Earthling (1997), but the idea was scrapped. "Untitled No. 1" contains a dance beat influenced by Indian music. Bowie's phased vocals are both discernable (such as the line "It's clear that some things never change") and incomprehensible, with various "Ooohs" throughout. "Ian Fish, U.K. Heir" is an ambient piece reminiscent of the electronic work on "Heroes" (1977). It contains gramophone static and a slowed and distorted version of the title track's melody. In the liner notes, Bowie wrote: "The real discipline is ... to pare down all superfluous elements, in a reductive fashion, leaving as near as possible a deconstructed or so-called 'significant form', to use a 30's terminology." The title is an anagram of Hanif Kureishi. The album ends with an alternate version of the title track (labeled the "rock mix"), featuring Lenny Kravitz on guitar.

== Release and reissues ==
The Buddha of Suburbia was released solely in the United Kingdom and Europe on 8 November 1993 with the catalogue number 74321 170042. Arista Records (in association with BMG International) marketed it as a soundtrack album instead of a David Bowie album. The original album sleeve, featuring a still from the BBC serial's stage production of The Jungle Book overlaying a map of Beckenham, lacked Bowie's face and made his name almost unnoticeable. Bowie also did nothing to promote the album, aside from attending one photo session with Kureishi and filming a music video for the title track. With little promotion, the album flopped, charting at a mere 87 on the UK Albums Chart. It was further overshadowed by EMI's The Singles Collection, released a week after Buddha and which reached the UK top ten. The title track was released as a single, with "Dead Against It" as the B-side, on 22 November and reached number 35 on the UK Singles Chart.

The album remained unavailable in the United States until 24 October 1995, when it was reissued by Bowie's new label Virgin Records with alternate cover artwork depicting a black and white photo of Bowie sitting on a bed. By this time, Bowie had already released Outside. Buddha received a worldwide reissue by EMI in September 2007, featuring a sepia-tinted version of the 1995 cover art, although this reissue was also met with little fanfare. In 2021, the album was remastered and included as part of the box set Brilliant Adventure (1992–2001). With this release, it became available on vinyl for the first time in almost 30 years.

== Critical reception ==
Professional ratings
Review scores
Source	Rating
AllMusic	3/5 stars
The Encyclopedia of Popular Music	3/5 stars
MSN Music (Consumer Guide)	(dud)
Music Week	3/5 stars
Pitchfork	7.8/10
Q	4/5 stars
Record Collector	3/5 stars
The Rolling Stone Album Guide	1/5 stars
Uncut	8/10

Despite receiving positive reviews from British critics on release, with Q magazine saying that "Bowie's music walks a knife-edge once again", The Buddha of Suburbia remains one of Bowie's least-known works. He later stated: "The album itself only got one review, a good one as it happens, and is virtually non-existent as far as my catalogue goes – it was designated a soundtrack and got zilch in the way of marketing money. A real shame." Ten years after its release, he named Buddha his favourite album.

Latter-day reviews have praised Buddha as Bowie's "lost great album", a return to form, his finest in a decade, and even his most important and best release of the 1990s. Some reviewers labelled it—at the time—his best work since Scary Monsters (1980). Michael Keefe of PopMatters argued it was Bowie's most enjoyable record of the ten years' worth of material that preceded it. Others recognised Buddha as foreshadowing Bowie's subsequent 1990s and 2000s works. Marszalek wrote that it "contains an approach and execution that not only captures the best of Bowie's past but also kick starts his future". Trynka labels it one of "Bowie's triumphs" that "benefitted from its rushed creation", while James E. Perone finds it "a thoroughly listenable album and one that makes for interesting study". AllMusic's Stephen Thomas Erlewine later called it "an excellent, adventurous album that flew under the radar in 1993". Regarding its obscurity, Pegg states that it "remains one of the choicest treasures awaiting discovery among Bowie's less familiar work", one that displays him "at his most bravely experimental". In 2024, Uncut ranked the album at number 459 in their list of "The 500 Greatest Albums of the 1990s", calling it a "lost gem" that mingled the "glorious" title track and an early version of "Strangers When We Meet" with "instrumentals containing echoes from the '70s."

Buddha has also attracted mixed reviews, critics feeling it does not represent one of Bowie's major works. Record Collector's Jason Draper even thought it was "perhaps still best approached as a soundtrack". David Sackllah of Consequence of Sound summarised: "The album doesn't find Bowie diverging from anything he'd done before and feels like another middling entry in the midst of a decade where he would put out some of his most disappointing work," concluding "this record doesn't have much to offer to anyone who isn't a die-hard fan". In his Consumer' Guide, Robert Christgau called it a dud. Buddha has ultimately placed low in lists ranking the artist's studio albums.

== Track listing ==
All songs are written by David Bowie.

The Buddha of Suburbia track listing
No.	Title	Length
1.	"Buddha of Suburbia"	4:28
2.	"Sex and the Church"	6:25
3.	"South Horizon" (instrumental)	5:26
4.	"The Mysteries" (instrumental)	7:12
5.	"Bleed Like a Craze, Dad"	5:22
6.	"Strangers When We Meet"	4:58
7.	"Dead Against It"	5:48
8.	"Untitled No. 1"	5:01
9.	"Ian Fish, U.K. Heir" (instrumental)	6:27
10.	"Buddha of Suburbia" (featuring Lenny Kravitz)	4:19

== Personnel ==
According to the liner notes and the biographer Nicholas Pegg:

- David Bowie – vocals, keyboards, synths, guitar, alto and baritone saxophones, keyboard percussion
- Erdal Kızılçay – keyboards, trumpet, bass, guitar, drums, percussion
- 3D Echo (Rob Clydesdale, Gary Taylor, Isaac Daniel Prevost) – drums, bass, guitar on "Bleed Like a Craze, Dad"
- Mike Garson – piano on "Bleed Like a Craze, Dad" and "South Horizon"
- Lenny Kravitz – guitar on "Buddha of Suburbia" (rock mix)

Production

- David Bowie – producer
- David Richards – programmer, engineer, mixer, producer
- Mike Ruggieri – piano recording
- Dominik Taqua – assistant engineering
- John Jefford, BBC – photography
- David and Anne Hardy (Wybo Haas) – design
