= The Black Album =

The Black Album may refer to:

== Music ==
- Metallica (album), 1991 metal album by Metallica, commonly referred as The Black Album
- The Black Album (Prince album), initially cancelled 1987 funk album by American recording artist Prince, released in 1994
- The Black Album (The Damned album), 1980 rock album
- The Black Album, 1981 bootleg recording of The Beatles
- The Black Album/Come On Feel The Dandy Warhols, 1996 compilation album by The Dandy Warhols
- The Black Album (Jay-Z album), 2003 studio album by American rapper Jay Z
- The Black Album (compilation album), 2011 compilation album of former Beatles members' material by Ethan Hawke
- Weezer (Black Album), 2019 album by Weezer
- Accept Your Own and Be Yourself (The Black Album), a 1997 hip-hop album by producer No I.D.
- Planxty (album), 1973 Irish folk album by Planxty
- Neu! '75, 1975 rock album by Neu!
- Black Album (Kino album), 1990
- The Black Album, 2001 box set by Sinéad O'Connor
- The Black Album, CD by Babybird included in the 2002 box set The Original Lo-Fi
- Black Album, 2008 album by French rap duo Lunatic
- Songs: Ohia, 1997 indie album by Jason Molina known as the Black Album

== Other ==
- The Black Album (1996), a novel by Hanif Kureishi
- The Black Album (1995), a novel by Qaisra Shahraz
- The Black Album (play), a play based on the book by Hanif Kureishi

== See also ==
- Top R&B/Hip-Hop Albums, a Billboard magazine chart formerly listed as Top Black Albums
- 31 VII 69 10:26-10:49 PM / 23 VIII 64 2:50:45-3:11 AM The Volga Delta, a 1969 album by La Monte Young and Marian Zazeela, unofficially known as the Black Record
- The White Album (disambiguation)
- Black (disambiguation)
