= Kevin Elyot =

British playwright, screenwriter and actor (1951–2014)

- Born: 18 July 1951; Birmingham, England, UK
- Died: 7 June 2014 (aged 62); London, England
- Education: University of Bristol
- Occupations: Playwright, screenwriter

Kevin Elyot (18 July 1951 – 7 June 2014) was a British playwright, screenwriter and actor. His most notable works include the play My Night with Reg (1994) and the film Clapham Junction (2007). His stage work has been performed by leading theatre companies including the Royal Court, National Theatre, Bush Theatre, Royal Shakespeare Company, Donmar Warehouse and in the West End. He finished his final play, Twilight Song, not long before he died in 2014, which received a posthumous premiere at London's Park Theatre in 2017.

== Early life ==
Kevin Elyot was born in the Birmingham suburb of Handsworth, West Midlands, England, on 18 July 1951. As a child he was a member of the Anglo-Catholic church of St Peter's choir, and studied the piano. He studied at King Edward's School, Birmingham, where he acted the part of Desdemona, and sang in the third performance of Britten's "War Requiem". He also sang in the Birmingham Cathedral choir as a treble.

As children he and his sister were regularly taken to the theatre. He cited a trip to Stratford-upon-Avon when he was around 10 years old, to see a Royal Shakespeare Company production of Richard III starring Christopher Plummer and Eric Porter, as the "start of my love affair with the place", and afterwards he would take himself on the bus to Stratford to go to the theatre.

He went to the University of Bristol and graduated with a Theatre Studies degree in 1973.

== Career ==
Elyot began his theatre career as an actor, working regularly at London's Bush Theatre from 1976, with the pioneering company Gay Sweatshop, and at the King's Head Theatre. Following encouragement from the Bush Theatre's artistic team, he submitted his first play to them, then titled Cosy. The play opened on 3 November 1982 under the title Coming Clean, in a production directed by David Hayman. The play tackled sexual relationships in a period when AIDS was still a rumour in Britain. It won the Samuel Beckett Award.

On the back of the success of his debut work he was taken on briefly by agent Peggy Ramsay. After a deflating comment from Ramsay about the manuscript for his second play, A Quick One, which remained unstaged, he wrote the radio play According to Plan, which was broadcast on Radio 4 in 1987.

His first adaptation, of Wilkie Collins's detective novel The Moonstone, premiered at the Worcester Swan in 1990.

In 1992, Elyot created a new translation for the Royal Shakespeare Company of Alexander Ostrovsky's Artists and Admirers. The production was directed by Phyllida Lloyd with a cast that included Linda Bassett and opened at the Barbican Centre's The Pit on 13 October 1992.

Elyot's breakthrough play, My Night with Reg, was commissioned by the Hampstead Theatre in 1991. Hampstead passed on the play in 1993, at which point his agent submitted it to Stephen Daldry, who had just been appointed as the Royal Court Theatre's Artistic Director. Daldry was swift to schedule the play for a spring opening in 1994, and suggested Roger Michell should direct. It was a smash hit at the Royal Court's Theatre Upstairs, with a cast including David Bamber and John Sessions. From there it quickly transferred to the West End, first to the Criterion Theatre, and then to the even larger Playhouse Theatre where the cast included Hugh Bonneville. The play and the production won many awards including the Laurence Olivier Award for Best New Comedy and the Evening Standard Theatre Awards Best Comedy. It went on to premiere in New York in June 1997 in a production by The New Group starring Maxwell Caulfield, where it was positively reviewed by Ben Brantley in The New York Times.

Elyot also wrote the screenplay for the film adaptation of My Night with Reg, which was again directed by Michell and featured the entire original Royal Court cast, and which premiered on 14 March 1997. Elyot's television adaptation of The Moonstone was broadcast later that same year, with a cast featuring Greg Wise, Keeley Hawes and Antony Sher.

Elyot's next two plays were both directed by Ian Rickson. The Day I Stood Still premiered in the Royal National Theatre's Cottesloe on 22 January 1998, with a cast led by Adrian Scarborough. The play is a comedy drama about the heartbreak of unrequited love and the power of memories, and was nominated for Best Play at the Evening Standard Theatre Awards. Mouth to Mouth saw Elyot return to the Royal Court but now on the main stage Downstairs, and opened on 1 February 2001, starring Lindsay Duncan. A more sombre drama about a man haunted by feelings of guilt and shame over an incident in his past, the play transferred with Duncan to the West End's Albery Theatre on 17 May 2001. Mouth to Mouth was nominated for both the Laurence Olivier Award and Evening Standard Theatre Award for Best Play,

2004's Forty Winks again premiered at the Royal Court Theatre Downstairs, as an examination on love and growing up. It was directed by Katie Mitchell with a cast that included Dominic Rowan and Carey Mulligan.

Elyot was continuing to build a successful career as a screenwriter, which by now included episodes of Agatha Christie's Poirot and Agatha Christie's Marple. His last stage play was a new version of Christie's And Then There Were None in 2005, which opened directly in the West End at the Gielgud Theatre. It was favourably received, with The Daily Telegraph calling it "a gripping, gory corker. The show achieves a perfect balance between thrills and chills and a knowing, tongue-in-cheek humour."

Further screen success followed. Eylot adapted Patrick Hamilton's trilogy Twenty Thousand Streets Under the Sky into a three-part miniseries for the BBC, starring Zoë Tapper, Bryan Dick and Sally Hawkins.

Clapham Junction, for Channel 4, weaves together five stories of contemporary gay life during one hot summer's night, from a civil partnership ceremony to a heated dinner party, and from school and work to bars and clubs. The cast included Samantha Bond, Rupert Graves, Rachel Blake, Luke Treadaway, Richard Lintern and Paul Nicholls.

Elyot's final television film was an adaptation of Christopher Isherwood's autobiography, Christopher and His Kind, which tells the story of Isherwood's years living in hedonistic Weimar Berlin in the early 1930s. It was directed by Geoffrey Sax and starred Matt Smith as Isherwood, along with Toby Jones, Lindsay Duncan, Imogen Poots and Douglas Booth. It was first broadcast in the UK on BBC Two on 19 March 2011, and was also broadcast internationally.

Elyot died while preparations were under way for the Donmar Warehouse's 2014 revival of My Night with Reg, and shortly after completing Twilight Song, his first original stage play since 2004's Forty Winks. Twilight Song traces one family's hidden liaisons over half a century from the 1960s to the present day, and received a posthumous premiere at London's Park Theatre in summer 2017 to coincide with the 50th anniversary of the Sexual Offences Act 1967. The production was directed by Anthony Banks, and starred Adam Garcia (who had previously starred in Elyot's television drama Riot at the Rite), Bryony Hannah, Paul Higgins, Philip Bretherton and Hugh Ross.

== Personal life ==
Elyot was openly homosexual and some of the plays he created were based on growing up as a young homosexual man, such as The Day I Stood Still (in which he addresses growing up and dealing with his own homosexuality in the UK in the 1960s).

== Works ==
=== Plays ===
- Coming Clean, Bush Theatre, 1982
- The Moonstone (Wilkie Collins), Worcester Swan, 1990
- Artists and Admirers (a new translation from Alexander Ostrovsky), RSC at the Barbican, 1992
- My Night with Reg, Royal Court and West End, 1994
- The Day I Stood Still, National Theatre, 1998
- Mouth to Mouth, Royal Court and West End, 2001
- Forty Winks, Royal Court, 2004
- And Then There Were None (Agatha Christie), West End, 2005
- Twilight Song, Park Theatre, 2017

=== Television ===
- The Woman in White, BBC, 1982
- Killing Time, BBC, 1990
- My Night with Reg, premiere at London Lesbian and Gay Film Festival, 14 March 1997
- The Moonstone, BBC/Carlton, 1997
- No Night Is Too Long, BBC, 2002
- Twenty Thousand Streets Under the Sky, BBC, 2005
- Riot at the Rite, BBC, 2005
- Clapham Junction, Channel 4, 2007
- Christopher and His Kind, BBC, 2011
- Agatha Christie's Poirot (3 episodes), ITV, 2003–2013
- Agatha Christie's Marple (6 episodes), ITV, 2004–2013

== Awards and nominations ==
Year	Nominee / work	Award	Result
1983	Kevin Elyot for Coming Clean	Samuel Beckett Award	Won
1990	Killing Time	Writers’ Guild Award for Best TV Play or Film	Won
1994	My Night with Reg	Evening Standard Theatre Award for Best Comedy	Won
1994	Kevin Elyot for My Night with Reg	Critics' Circle Theatre Award for Most Promising Playwright	Won
1994	My Night with Reg	Writers’ Guild Awards for Best Play	Won
1995	My Night with Reg	Laurence Olivier Award for Best Comedy	Won
1998	The Day I Stood Still	Evening Standard Theatre Award for Best Play	Nominated
2001	Mouth to Mouth	Laurence Olivier Award for Best Play	Nominated
2001	Mouth to Mouth	Evening Standard Theatre Award for Best Play	Nominated
2006	Simon Curtis, Kevin Elyot and Kate Harwood for Twenty Thousand Streets Under the Sky	Banff Television Festival Rockie Award for Best Mini Series	Nominated
2012	Geoffrey Sax (director), Célia Duval (producer) and Kevin Elyot (writer) for Christopher and His Kind	Broadcasting Press Guild Award for Best Single Drama	Nominated

== Sources ==
- Interview, Independent.co.uk. Retrieved 6 August 2011.
