= Nina Raine =

English theatre director and playwright

Nina Raine is an English theatre director and playwright, the only daughter of Craig Raine and Ann Pasternak Slater, and a grand niece of the Russian novelist Boris Pasternak.

She graduated from Christ Church, Oxford in 1998 with a First in English Literature.

== Life and career ==
Raine won the Channel Four/Jerwood Space Young Regional Theatre Director bursary in 2000 to train as a director at the Royal Court Theatre where she assisted on a number of plays including My Zinc Bed, Mouth to Mouth, Presence and Fucking Games.

She has directed plays in several other theatres since then, including Unprotected at the Liverpool Everyman and the Edinburgh Festival in 2006, for which she won the TMA Best Director Award, and Shades by Alia Bano as part of the Royal Court Theatre's Young Writers' Festival in 2009, as well as Jumpy by April De Angelis at the Royal Court and in the West End.

Rabbit, Raine's first work as a dramatist, premiered at the Old Red Lion Theatre in London in the summer of 2006. The play, which she directed, transferred to the Trafalgar Studios later that autumn. She won both the 2006 Evening Standard's Charles Wintour Award for Most Promising Playwright and the Most Promising Playwright Award at the 2006 Critics' Circle Theatre Awards. Rabbit was performed in New York City in June 2007 at the Brits Off Broadway Festival.

Raine's second play Tribes was produced by the Royal Court in London, in October 2010, directed by Roger Michell and starring Harry Treadaway, Michelle Terry and Stanley Townsend. It had its Australian premiere at the Melbourne Theatre Company in February 2012, and its North American premiere at New York City's Barrow Street Theatre, also in 2012. It was then produced by Artists Repertory Theatre in Portland in February 2015. Tribes is about a deaf son who is raised in a dysfunctional, Jewish, hearing family (Raine is Jewish on her mother's side).

Tiger Country, commissioned by Hampstead Theatre and produced by Alcove Entertainment, opened in January 2011.

Raine directed and dramaturged Behind the Image by Alia Bano, which premiered at the Royal Court's 2008 Rough Cuts Season. In 2013, she directed Longing, an adaptation of two Anton Chekov stories by novelist William Boyd. Her fourth play, Consent, premiered at the National Theatre in April 2017, in a co-production with Out of Joint. Directed by Roger Michell, it starred Anna Maxwell Martin, Ben Chaplin and Pip Carter. Her fifth play, Bach & Sons, a work on the life of Johann Sebastian Bach, ran at the Bridge Theatre, with Simon Russell Beale as the composer in the premiere production.

Raine was elected a Fellow of the Royal Society of Literature in 2019.
