= Gabriel's Gift =

Novel by Hanif Kureishi

- First edition (publ. Faber & Faber)
- Author: Hanif Kureishi
- Language: English
- Publisher: Faber and Faber
- Publication date: 2001
- Publication place: United Kingdom
- Media type: Print
- Pages: 178 p.
- ISBN: 9780571209293
- OCLC: 644957588

Gabriel's Gift is a novel by Hanif Kureishi first published in 2001 about a 15-year-old Londoner called Gabriel who wants to become a filmmaker and whose parents break up rather unexpectedly one day. As opposed to other protagonists created by Kureishi, Rex, Christine and Gabriel are white.

John Crace, in The Guardian, summarised the story thus: "Co-dependent 15-year-old Buddha of Suburbia sorts out his parents' predictably dreary middle-aged rock'n'roll existential angst before embarking on his own".

== Plot summary ==
Rex Bunch, Gabriel's father, is a musician who, for a short time back in the 1970s, played in pop icon Lester Jones's band. However, while (the fictitious) Lester Jones is still going strong almost thirty years later, Rex has been leading a quiet and modest life without a regular income together with his live-in partner, Christine, Gabriel's mother, who back in the good old days designed trendy clothes for various rock stars. Gabriel's twin brother Archie died while still little, and in many ways the family of three still live and think according to the unwritten laws of the late 1960s and 1970s, despising anything remotely connected with middle class mentality, advocating universal freedom, and smoking the occasional joint.

When Christine has had enough of Rex and his lazy, good-for-nothing ways, she throws him out of the house, and for the first time in decades Rex has to fend for himself. While Christine herself gets a job as a waitress in a bar and hires an au pair from some Eastern European country to look after Gabriel, Rex, left to his own devices, ends up in a shabby bedsit a few blocks away from his former home but even there has difficulty paying the rent.

A meeting with Lester Jones renews Rex's hopes of becoming a sought-after musician again, but when Rex and Gabriel visit him at his hotel it soon turns out that all he wants is listen to Rex's reminiscences of their days together for his intended memoir. To Rex's dismay, he does not even pay him for it; however, on parting he presents Gabriel with one of his drawings.

A talented creative artist himself, Gabriel is impressed by this gift, but it soon becomes clear to him that both his parents are after the picture: Christine because, for the time being, she wants to keep it in a safe place; and Rex because he wants to sell it immediately. In order to prevent yet another argument between his mum and dad, Gabriel secretly makes two copies of the drawing—in doing so he has to forge Lester Jones's signature twice— and hands one copy to each of his parents while keeping the original for himself.

Unfortunately, each parent independently has the same idea of presenting the drawing to Speedy, an old friend of theirs who runs a hamburger restaurant full of 1970s memorabilia—a place occasionally even visited by Lester Jones himself—so that the picture can be exhibited there.

At Speedy's hamburger joint, a chance meeting with film producer Jake Ambler (also fictitious) sets off Rex's teaching career. Looking for someone to give his spoiled teenage son private guitar lessons, Jake offers the job to Rex who, encouraged by Gabriel to do something useful and earn some money at the same time, reluctantly agrees ("We're not so desperate that we're going to start working for a living") and eventually, after word of mouth has spread and he is teaching not just one but several kids, quite enjoys being seen as an authority on music by his pupils.

Before the truth about Lester Jones's drawing is found out, Gabriel strikes a deal with Speedy, regains possession of the picture in exchange for a painting of Speedy he has to paint himself, and destroys the two copies. Seeing her ex-partner's reformation, Christine reconsiders her decision to spend the rest of her life without him and does not mind the end of her affair with George, a young artist and a regular at the bar where she is waitressing. At the end of the novel Rex and Christine get married, and in the following summer, under Jake Ambler's supervision, Gabriel starts shooting his first film.
