= My Night with Reg (film) =

- VHS cover
- Directed by: Roger Michell
- Written by: Kevin Elyot (play and screenplay)
- Produced by: Simon Curtis
- Starring: David Bamber; Anthony Calf; Joe Duttine; Roger Frost; Kenneth MacDonald; John Sessions
- Cinematography: John Daly
- Edited by: Kate Evans
- Production company: BBC
- Distributed by: BBC
- Release date: 1996
- Running time: 105 minutes
- Country: United Kingdom
- Language: English

My Night with Reg is a 1996 British film adapted from the Kevin Elyot play of the same title, and directed by Roger Michell, who had directed the play on stage. The film marks the beginning of Michell's career in film.

== Synopsis ==
Entirely set among London's gay community in the mid-1980s against the background of the mounting AIDS crisis, My Night with Reg follows the ups and downs of a circle of gay friends over a period of several years. One of the group, the Reg mentioned in the title, is not a character in the play but the whole plot revolves around his apparent promiscuity and the chain reaction of deception and betrayal set off by it.

== Cast ==
- David Bamber as Guy
- Anthony Calf as John
- Joe Duttine as Eric
- Roger Frost as Bernie
- Kenneth MacDonald as Benny
- John Sessions as Daniel

== Reception ==
Jasper Rees wrote in The Independent "there's a good deal of all male kissing here, but it's mostly polite, puckered pecking between consenting cruisers". Phil Penfold of The Press wrote "the great thing about this story is that it's not a proselytising gay drama in the way that the first post-AIDS era movies were, its intention is more to take the stigma and terror out of gay lifestyles."

== See also ==
- List of LGBTQ-related films
