= Udayan Prasad =

Indian-British film and television director

Udayan Prasad (born Sevagram, 4 February 1953) is an Indian-born British television and film director. He is best known for his films Brothers in Trouble (1995) and My Son the Fanatic (1997), the latter based on a short story by Hanif Kureishi.

== Life ==
Udayan Prasad was born in Sevagram, Maharashtra, India in 1953, and grew up on an ashram. He came to Britain when he was nine. He started studying archaeology at Birmingham University, but left to study graphic design at Leeds Polytechnic, where he started filmmaking.

== Filmography ==
=== Film ===
- Brothers in Trouble (1995)
- My Son the Fanatic (1997)
- Gabriel & Me (2001)
- Opa! (2005)
- The Yellow Handkerchief (2008)

=== Television ===
- A Corner of a Foreign Field (1986, Channel 4)
- Here Is The News (1989, BBC)
- 102 Boulevard Haussmann (1990, BBC)
- They Never Slept (1991, BBC)
- Running Late (1992, BBC)
- Femme Fatale (1993, BBC)
- Talking Heads (1998, BBC): Playing Sandwiches
- Silent Witness (2010, BBC): Intent
- The Tunnel (2013, Sky/Canal+) (two episodes)
- Selection Day (2018, Netflix)
- Becoming Elizabeth (2022, Starz)

== Awards ==
- 1991: San Francisco International Film Festival Award in the category Golden Gate Award for Screen Two for the episode 102 Boulevard Haussmann
- 1992: BAFTA Award - nomination in the category Best Single Drama for Screen Two for the Episode 102 Boulevard Haussmann
- 1993: San Francisco International Film Festival Award - nomination in the category Television Feature for Screen One for the episode Running Late
- 1995: Third place in the Emden International Film Festival in the category Emden Film Award for Brothers in Trouble
- 1995: Thessaloniki Film Festival Award in the category Golden Alexander for Brothers in Trouble
- 1997: Brussels International Film Festival Award - Nomination in the category Best European Feature for My Son the Fanatic
- 1997: Dinard British Film Festival Award - Nomination in the category Golden Hitchcock for My Son the Fanatic
- 1999: BAFTA Awards - Nomination in the category Best Single Drama for Talking Heads 2 for the episode Playing Sandwiches
- 2000: Independent Spirit Awards - Nomination in the category Best Foreign Film for My Son the Fanatic
