= Anthony Calf =

British actor

- Born: Anthony Calf; 4 May 1959 (age 67); Hammersmith, London, England
- Education: Bradfield College; London Academy of Music and Dramatic Art
- Occupation: Actor
- Years active: 1982–present
- Spouse: Caroline Harker
- Children: 3

Anthony Calf (born 4 May 1959) is an English actor. He studied acting at the London Academy of Music and Dramatic Art (LAMDA). He had recurring roles in the television medical drama Holby City, as Michael Beauchamp, and New Tricks as DAC Robert Strickland. He has also worked in theatre, where his credits include productions of The Madness of George III with the National Theatre and A Midsummer Night's Dream, The false servant at the National Theatre and Rock'n Roll at the Duke of York's Theatre. He was nominated as best actor in the Irish Times Theatre Awards 2008 for his work in Uncle Vanya at the Gate Theatre. He was featured in King Charles III on Broadway in 2015.

== Career ==
He made his television debut in the 1982 Doctor Who episode The Visitation, he returned to the series 35 years later in the 2017 episode "Empress of Mars". Also in 1982, he landed the role of Digby Geste in a television adaptation of Beau Geste. His other television credits include the part of novelist Lawrence Durrell in My Family and Other Animals (1987), Pip in Great Expectations and Colonel Fitzwilliam in the 1995 BBC adaptation of Pride and Prejudice as well as Tom Faggus in the BBC adaptation of Lorna Doone. He has also appeared in episodes of Doc Martin, Foyle's War, Midsomer Murders and Agatha Christie's Poirot.

In 2010, Calf played the Foreign Secretary Anthony Eden in the BBC's revival of Upstairs, Downstairs, reprising his stage role as Eden (twenty years older as Prime Minister at the time of Suez) in Howard Brenton's Never So Good (2008). In 2019 he played William Wickham, founder of the British foreign secret service, in some episodes of Poldark, series 5.

== Personal life ==
He is married to the actress Caroline Harker, with whom he has three daughters.

== Selected filmography ==
=== Television ===
- Partygate (2023) as Sir Mark Sedwill
- Death in Paradise (2021) as Phillip Carlton
- Poldark (2019) as William Wickham
- King Lear (2018) as Duke of Albany
- Midsomer Murders "The Village That Rose From The Dead" (2016) as Julian Lennard
- Dracula (2013) as Dr William Murray
- New Tricks (2005–15) as DAC Robert Strickland
- Restless (2012) as Gerald Laird
- Call the Midwife (2012) as Mr. Tracey
- Upstairs Downstairs (2011) as Anthony Eden
- Identity (2010) as Max
- Lewis (2010) as Malcom Finneston
- Material Girl (2010) as Anthony Chatsworth
- Trinity (2009) as Lord Ravensby
- Doc Martin (2009) as Richard Wenn
- Mistresses (2008) as John
- Dalziel and Pascoe (2007) as Joe Furst
- The Good Samaritan (2007) as Michael Ambley
- Holby City (2005–06) as Michael Beauchamp
- Tom's Christmas Tree (2006) as Officer
- The Impressionists (2006) as Émile Zola
- Beau Brummell: This Charming Man (2006) as Frederick, Duke of York
- The Strange Case of Sherlock Holmes & Arthur Conan Doyle (2006) as Bryan Charles Walker
- The Robinsons (2005) as Peter
- Amnesia (2004) as John Deen
- The Murder Room (2004) as Lord Martlesham
- Indian Dream (2003) as David
- The Brides in the Bath (2003) as Howard Munday
- Judge John Deed, 2 episodes (2003) as James Brooklands
- Doc Martin and the Legend of the Cloutie (2003) as Tim Bowden
- Lucky Jim (2003) as Cecil Goldsmith
- Sirens (2002) as Anthony Soames
- Foyle's War, 1 episode (2002) as Wing Commander Martin Keller
- The Inspector Lynley Mysteries: A Great Deliverance as Simon St James
- Lorna Doone (2000) as Tom Faggus
- Midsomer Murders "Dead Man's Eleven" (1999) as Stephen Cavendish
- Our Mutual Friend (1998) as Alfred Lammle
- Kavanagh QC, Mute of Malice (1997) as Miles Beddoes
- A Touch of Frost, True Confessions (1997) as James Barr
- Pride and Prejudice (1995) TV miniseries as Colonel Fitzwilliam
- Bramwell (1995) as Andrew Armstrong
- Riders (1993) as Billy Lloyd-Foxe
- Agatha Christie's Poirot – The Mysterious Affair at Styles (1990) as Lawrence Cavendish
- Great Expectations (1989) TV miniseries as Pip
- Tanamera - Lion of Singapore (1989) as Tim Dexter
- My Family and Other Animals (1987) as Lawrence Durrell
- Fortunes of War (1987) as Cpl. Arnold
- Beau Geste (1982) as Digby Geste
- Doctor Who, The Visitation (1982) as Charles

=== Film ===
- De Gaulle : Tilting Iron (2026) as Edward Spears
- The Children Act (2017) as Mark Berner
- The Man Who knew Infinity (2015) as Howard
- Straightheads (2007) as Heffer
- Dead Cool (2004) as Mark
- Fairy Tale: a True Story (1997) as Hodson
- A Woman of the North (1997) as Hugo
- Anna Karenina (1997) as Serpuliovskoy
- My Night With Reg (1996) as John
- The Madness of King George (1994) as Fitzroy
- Great Expectations (1989) as Pip
- Oxford Blues (1984) as Gareth Rycroft

== Theatre ==
- Twelfth Night (2017) as Malvolio at the Royal Exchange, Manchester
- The Hard Problem (2015)
- Stephen Ward the Musical (2013–2014)
- Private Lives (2013)
- My Fair Lady (2012–13)
- Private Lives (2012)
- Death and the Maiden (2011)
- The Deep Blue Sea (2011)
- Les Parents Terribles (2011)
- The White Guard (2010)
- The Power of Yes (2009–10)
- Wallenstein (play) (2009)
- Gethsemane (play) (2008–09)
- Never So Good (play) (2008)
- Uncle Vanya (2007)
- Rock'n Roll (2006)
- The False Servant (2005)
- The Hotel in Amsterdam (2003)
- A Buyer's Market (2002)
- Cressida (2000)
- Dolly West's Kitchen (2000)
- Betrayal (1998)
- Neverland
- Cracked
- My Night with Reg
- The Madness of George III
- Green Fingers
- Another Country
- Filumena
- She Stoops to Conquer
- The Boy Friend
- A Midsummer Night's Dream
