= David Bamber =

English actor (born 1954)

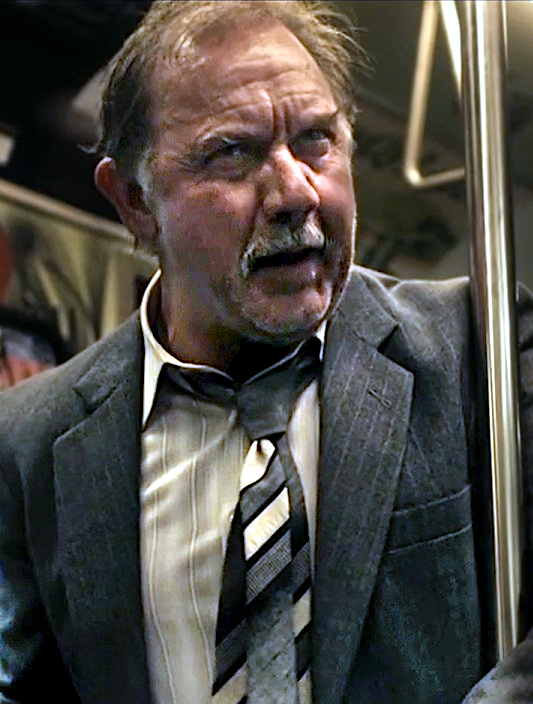
- Bamber in Urban Myths 2019
- Born: David James Bamber; 19 September 1954 (age 72); Walkden, Lancashire, England
- Occupation: Actor
- Years active: 1982–present
- Spouse: Julia Swift (m. 1982)
- Children: 2, including Ethan
- Relatives: David Swift (father-in-law); Paula Jacobs (mother-in-law)

David James Bamber (born 19 September 1954) is an English actor. His credits include Privates on Parade (1983), Juliet Bravo (1983), Crown Court (1984), Call Me Mister (1986), The Buddha of Suburbia (1993), Pride and Prejudice (1995), Chalk (1997), Mile High (2004), Beethoven (2005), Rome (2005–2007), Valkyrie (2008), Psychoville (2009–2011), The Borgias (2011), The Hollow Crown (2012), What Remains (2013), Darkest Hour (2017), Borg vs McEnroe (2017), Peterloo (2018), A Very English Scandal (2018), Flesh and Blood (2020) and The Regime (2024).

He won the 1995 Laurence Olivier Award for Best Actor for his performance as Guy in My Night with Reg.

== Early years ==
Bamber was born 19 September 1954 in Walkden, Lancashire. His very first stage performance was aged 5 as a pig in Tom Tom the Piper's Son. He joined the Manchester Youth Theatre, graduating with a drama degree. playing Pandarus in Troilus and Cressida. Bamber studied acting at Bristol University from 1973 to 1976, He continued his training at the Royal Academy of Dramatic Art (RADA) graduating 1979, with an Acting (RADA Diploma).

== Career ==
Bamber's first film role was in 1982 as Sergeant Charles Bishop in the World War II comedy Privates on Parade (1983). He made appearances in Juliet Bravo (1983) and Crown Court (1984), before securing a regular role as Fred Hurley in Call Me Mister (1986).

He appeared in the BBC adaptations of Hanif Kureishi's The Buddha of Suburbia (1993) and Jane Austen's Pride and Prejudice, in which he portrayed the Bennets' clergyman cousin, Mr. Collins. He also played the part of a junior treasury minister and stamp collecting enthusiast, Julian Whitaker, in an episode of The New Statesman, in which Alan frames Whitaker and forces his resignation. In 1997 he starred as Eric Slatt in two series of Steven Moffat's Chalk.

His best known international television role to date was his 2005–2007 role as Marcus Tullius Cicero in the HBO–BBC2 original television series, Rome. In Poirot, Series 3: Episode 7 "The Double Clue", he plays the effete middleman to a jewellery collector who is robbed. Bamber also played Adolf Hitler in Bryan Singer's film, Valkyrie. He played the part of Noel in the Sky Atlantic series Camping, and Admiral Ramsay in the 2017 film Darkest Hour.

As a stage actor, Bamber won the 1995 Laurence Olivier Award for Best Actor for his performance as Guy in My Night with Reg, a role he reprised in a 1996 BBC television adaptation. His roles as a voice actor include Emperor Constantine in the Doctor Who audio drama, The Council of Nicaea and as Jeremy Longstaff in the 2008 radio series The Way We Live Right Now. In 2013, he starred as Mathematics teacher Joe Sellers, alongside David Threlfall and Russell Tovey in the murder mystery miniseries What Remains.

== Personal life ==
Bamber is married to the actress Julia Swift, daughter of actors David Swift and Paula Jacobs. They have two sons, Theo (born 1991) and Ethan (born 1998). Ethan has played cricket for England U19s, Middlesex and Warwickshire. The family lives in North London.

== Filmography ==
=== Film ===
Year	Title	Role	Notes
1983	Privates on Parade	Sergeant Charles Bishop	
1983	The Oresteia	Chorus	
1985	The Doctor and the Devils	Cronin	
1988	High Hopes	Rupert	
1991	Dakota Road	Man on the Train	
1997	My Night with Reg	Guy	
2002	The Bourne Identity	Consulate Clerk	
2002	Gangs of New York	Passenger on Omnibus	
2003	I Capture the Castle	Vicar	
2006	Miss Potter	Fruing Warne	
2007	The All Together	Robin Swain	
2008	Valkyrie	Adolf Hitler	
2010	The King's Speech	Theatre Director	
2015	Christmas Eve	Walt	
2016	The Limehouse Golem	Mr. Greatorex	
2016	Chubby Funny	Mr. White	
2016	One Crazy Thing	Michael Steel	
2017	Mad to Be Normal	Dr. Meredith	
2017	Darkest Hour	Admiral Ramsay	
2017	Borg vs McEnroe	UK Commentator - George Barnes	
2018	This Weekend Will Change Your Life	David	
2018	Peterloo	Magistrate Rev Mallory	
2020	Enola Holmes	Sir Whimbrel	
2021	End of Term	DI Jim Burman	
TBA	The Bitter End		Filming

=== Television ===
Year	Title	Role	Notes
1983	Brass	Heseltine	1 episode
1983	Juliet Bravo	Mr. Saddlethwaite	Episode: "Mates"
1984	Crown Court	John Elliott	Episode: "Oddball: Part 1"
1984	Cockles	Graham	Recurring role
1984	The Brief	Lieutenant Dadd	Episode: "Long Glyn"
1986	Call Me Mister	Fred Hurley	Series regular
1987	Never Say Die	Verger	1 episode
1988	A Very Peculiar Practice	Professor Eric Middling	Episode: "Bad Vibrations"
1990	Who Bombed Birmingham?	David Mellor MP, Home Office	TV film
1991	The New Statesman	Julian Whitaker	Episode: "Natural Selection"
1991	Agatha Christie's Poirot	Bernard Parker	Episode: "The Double Clue"
1991	4 Play	Ted in 'Well Wishers'	Episode: "Seduction"
1991	The Bill	George Smith	Episode: "Samaritan"
1992	The Good Guys	Hubert Manuden	Episode: "Her Finest Hour"
1993	ITV Comedy Playhouse	Chris	Episode: "The Complete Guide to Relationships"
1993	The Buddha of Suburbia	Shadwell	TV Mini-series, 4 episodes
1993	Stalag Luft	The Prof	TV film
1994	The Chief	Philip Garrick	Episode #4.9
1994	Murder Most Horrid	Ray	Episode: "Smashing Bird"
1994	Wycliffe	Guy Bottrell	Episode: "The Dead Flautist"
1994	The Bill	Chris Baxter	Episode: "Games"
1995	Capital Lives	Fry	Episode: "Temp"
1995	Pride and Prejudice	Mr. Collins	Mini-series, 6 episodes
1995	Heavy Weather	P. Frobisher Pilbeam	TV film
1996	Heartbeat	Adrian Shaw	Episode: "Forget Me Not"
1996	Masterpiece	P. Frobisher Pilbeam	Episode: "Heavy Weather"
1997	Chalk	Eric Slatt	Series regular
1998	Neville's Island	Angus	TV film
2000	Masterpiece	Doctor Forrest	Episode: "The Railway Children"
2001	Masterpiece	Antonio	Episode: "The Merchant of Venice"
2002	Daniel Deronda	Lush	Mini-series
2002	Casualty	Dr. Martin Campbell	Episode: "Scapegoat"
2002	George Eliot: A Scandalous Life	Gossip	TV film
2003	Air Crash Investigation	Narrator	Documentary series
2003	Pollyanna	Reverend Ford	TV film
2004	Mile High	Bobbi Donnelly	2 episodes
2004	Animated Tales of the World	Wang Bao's Father	Episode: "The Magic Gourd"
2005	Beethoven	Prince Lichnowsky	Mini-series - documentary
2005-2007	Rome	Marcus Tullius Cicero	Recurring role
2006	Midsomer Murders	John Starkey	Episode: "Dead Letters"
2007	Trial & Retribution	Rex Stafford	Episode: "Curriculum Vitae"
2007	New Tricks	Dale Hewson	Episode: "Nine Lives"
2007	The Bill	Howard Gould	Episode: "Diamonds Are Deadly"
2007	Robin Hood	Physician Blight	Episode: "Ducking and Diving"
2007	Doc Martin	Mr. Porter	Episode: "Happily Ever After"
2007	Consenting Adults	Dr. Carl Winter	TV film
2008	EastEnders	Bernard	1 episode
2008	The Way We Live Right Now	Right Honorable Jeremy Longstaff	
2009	Hotel Babylon	Robert Carrick	2 episodes
2009	Collision	Sidney Norris	Mini-series
2009	Midsomer Murders	Anthony Prideaux	Episode: "The Black Book"
2009-2011	Psychoville	Robin	Recurring role
2010	The Village	Dr. Wagner	TV film
2011	The Borgias	Theo	2 episodes
2012	The Hollow Crown	Shallow	Episode: "Henry IV, Part 2"
2012	The Paradise	Charles Chisholm	1 episode
2012	The Nazi Gospels	Heinrich Himmler	TV film documentary
2013	Blandings	Herr Schnellhund	Episode: "Company for Gertrude"
2013	What Remains	Joe Sellers	Mini-series
2014	Casualty	Anthony Kingston	Episode: "In the Name of Love"
2014	Doctor Who	Captain Quell	Episode: "Mummy on the Orient Express"
2015	Father Brown	Walter Hubble	Episode: "The Curse of Amenhotep"
2015	Death in Paradise	Alan Butler	Episode: "Damned If You Do..."
2015	Doctors	Professor Jeremy Burroughs	Episode: "In the Presence of Beauty"
2015	The Sound of Music Live	Herr Zeller	TV film
2016	Midsomer Murders	Daniel Fargo	Episode: "A Dying Art"
2016	Camping	Noel	Mini-series, 4 episodes
2016	Plebs	Strabo	Episode: "The Weatherist"
2016	Victoria	Duke of Sussex	2 episodes
2016	Medici	Pope Eugenius IV	3 episodes
2017	Tina and Bobby	Alf Ramsey	Mini-series
2017	Snatch	Staff	4 episodes
2017	Quacks	Dr. Wyatt	Episode: "The Bishops Appendix"
2017	Gunpowder	Lord Northumberland	Mini-series
2018	Silent Witness	Brian Hawke	Episode: "Moment of Surrender"
2018	Call the Midwife	Stanley Hodgkiss	1 episode
2018	A Very English Scandal	Lord Arran	Mini-series
2018	Trust	Bela von Block	Recurring role
2018	Doctors	Derek Bartlett	Episode: "Face-Off"
2019	Queens of Mystery	Maximilian Sinclair	Episode: "Murder in the Dark: First Chapter"
2019	Urban Myths	Drunk	Episode: "Madonna and Basquiat"
2020	Grantchester	John Graham	Episode #5.2
2020	Inside No. 9	Robin	Episode: "Death Be Not Proud"
2020	Flesh and Blood	D.I. Doug Lineham	TV Mini-series, 4 episodes
2021	Dalgliesh	Edgar Froggart	TV Mini-series, 2 episodes
2024	The Regime	Schiff	TV Mini-series, 2 episodes
