= Consent (play) =

2017 play by Nina Raine

- Original language: English
- Written by: Nina Raine
- Genre: Drama

Premiere
- Date: 4 April 2017
- Place: Royal National Theatre

Consent is a 2017 play by Nina Raine. Its premiere production was at the National Theatre from 4 April to 17 May 2017. This run received positive reviews. In his 5-star review for The Independent, Paul Taylor stated "One of Nina Raine's most enjoyable and intelligent plays yet. Unreservedly recommended." In his 4-star review for The Telegraph, Dominic Cavendish described the play as a "tense, entertaining modern-day tragi-comedy... Is it worth seeing this ambitious would-be play for today? My much mulled verdict: yes, absolutely."

The 2017 production was revived for a West End transfer in May 2018 with the same director (Roger Michell) but a largely new cast and ran at the Harold Pinter Theatre until 11 August.

== Premiere casts ==
Character	2017	2018
Rachel	Priyanga Burford	Sian Clifford
Tim	Pip Carter	Lee Ingleby
Edward	Ben Chaplin	Stephen Campbell Moore
Gayle / Laura	Heather Craney	Heather Craney
Zara	Daisy Haggard	Clare Foster
Jake	Adam James	Adam James
Kitty	Anna Maxwell Martin	Claudie Blakley
