= Never So Good =

2008 play on Harold Macmillan

- Original language: English
- Written by: Howard Brenton
- Subject: Life and career of British politician Harold Macmillan

Premiere
- Date: 26 March 2008
- Place: National Theatre, London
- Official website

Never So Good is a 2008 play by Howard Brenton, which portrays the life and career of Harold Macmillan, a Conservative British politician who served as Prime Minister (1957–1963). It was first performed in the Lyttelton auditorium of the National Theatre, London, on 26 March 2008; previews began on 17 March 2008.

== Plot ==
The play is divided into four acts, covering Macmillan's early life and military experience in World War I; his involvement in British politics during the descent into World War II; the Suez Crisis, during which he served as Chancellor of the Exchequer; and his service as Prime Minister, during which the reputation of his government was severely damaged by the Profumo affair. Macmillan's younger self remains with him, providing mocking commentary.

== Productions ==
The National Theatre production was directed by Howard Davies. The cast included Jeremy Irons as Harold Macmillan, Anthony Calf as Anthony Eden, Pip Carter as young Harold Macmillan, Anna Carteret as Nellie Macmillan, Anna Chancellor as Dorothy Macmillan and Ian McNeice as Winston Churchill, whom he would later play in several episodes of Doctor Who.
