= My Son the Fanatic (film) =

- Directed by: Udayan Prasad
- Written by: Hanif Kureishi
- Based on: My Son the Fanatic by Hanif Kureishi
- Produced by: Chris Curling
- Starring: Om Puri; Rachel Griffiths; Akbar Kurtha; Stellan Skarsgård
- Cinematography: Alan Almond
- Edited by: David Gamble
- Music by: Stephen Warbeck
- Production companies: Miramax Films; BBC Films
- Distributed by: Feature Film
- Release dates: 21 October 1997 (France); 1 May 1998 (UK)
- Running time: 87 minutes
- Country: United Kingdom
- Language: English
- Budget: £2,134,800
- Box office: £123,000

My Son the Fanatic is a 1997 British comedy drama film directed by Udayan Prasad. It was written by Hanif Kureishi as an adaptation of his short story My Son the Fanatic.

== Plot ==
The plot of the film revolves around Parvez, a Pakistani-born taxi driver and a tolerant, secular Muslim. His life takes an unexpected dark turn when his son Farid converts to fundamentalist Islam, leading to a family breakdown and social conflict.

According to Rachel Donadio, The New York Times writer and editor, the film's theme is encapsulated in a pivotal scene:

One of the most revealing insights into Britain's recent social history comes early in My Son the Fanatic, Hanif Kureishi's tender and darkly prescient 1997 film. It’s morning in an unnamed city in northern England, and Parvez, a secular Pakistani immigrant taxi driver brilliantly portrayed by Om Puri, watches Farid, his increasingly devout college-age son, sell his electric guitar. "Where is that going?" Parvez asks Farid as the buyer drives off. "You used to love making a terrible noise with these instruments!" Farid, played by Akbar Kurtha, looks at his father with irritation. "You always said there were more important things than 'Stairway to Heaven'" he says impatiently in his thick northern English accent. "You couldn't have been more right".

== Cast ==
- Om Puri as Parvez: an alcoholic Pakistani taxi driver who after living in the UK for many years is still working hard to make a living in his taxi whilst others who migrated with him have become wealthy.
- Rachel Griffiths as Bettina/Sandra: a woman who goes by the name of Bettina who does sex work and has become friends with Parvez. Her real name is Sandra.
- Akbar Kurtha as Farid: Parvez's grown-up son who is to be engaged to the local Chief Inspector's daughter, Madeleine Fingerhut; upon discovering that his future father-in-law detests his family, he turns to Islam and is radicalized.
- Stellan Skarsgård as Mr. Schitz: a German businessman who makes use of both Parvez's and Bettina's professional services.
- Gopi Desai as Minoo: Parvez's wife, and mother of their son Farid.
- Harish Patel as Fizzy: Parvez's best friend, who, after borrowing a small sum of money from Parvez, made a business for himself and is quite wealthy.
- Sarah-Jane Potts as Madeleine Fingerhut, Farid's former fiancée.
- Geoffrey Bateman as Chief Inspector Fingerhut, Madeline's father.
- Judi Jones as Mrs Fingerhut:, Madeline's mother.
- Rowena King as Margot

== Critical reception ==
On Rotten Tomatoes, My Son the Fanatic has an approval rating of 79% based on 28 reviews.

Peter Travers of Rolling Stone wrote Parvez "draws most on our sympathies in this moving, painfully funny film. In Om Puri’s award-caliber performance, the price of happiness is rendingly observed."

== Awards ==
=== Nominations ===
- 2000, Independent Spirit Award: Best Foreign Film: Udayan Prasad
- 1998, British Independent Film Awards: Best Screenplay: Hanif Kureishi, Best British Actress: Rachel Griffiths
- 1998, Brussels International Film Festival, Best European Feature: Udayan Prasad
- 1997, Dinard Festival of British Cinema: Udayan Prasad

=== Wins ===
- 1998, Brussels International Film Festival, Best Actor: Om Puri
