= Asia House Festival of Asian Literature =

UK literary festival

The Asia House Festival of Asian Literature is the first and only literary festival in the UK dedicated to writing about Asia.

The Festival focuses on the newest and best books about Asia or Asians in an annual series of talks and discussions. Featured are fiction and non-fiction, written by Asians or non-Asians, covering a broad selection of Asian countries from the Persian Gulf in the West, to Indonesia in the East.

Believing that the most accessible way to understand a culture is through its literature, The Asia House Festival of Asian Literature offers a forum for the people of Britain to gain greater understanding of Asian cultures and of the Asian communities around them at home.

== Introduction and history ==
The first Asia House Festival of Asian Literature was held at Asia House in Central London, in May 2007. Founded by Adrienne Loftus Parkins, its current Director, it grew as a natural progression of an ongoing literature programme which has been running at Asia House since 2001. The Times has been the media partner of the Festival since its inception. The Festival is also supported by The National Lottery through Arts Council England. The Asia House produces the Festival in partnership with The Asian Word.

The Festival showcases both high-profile and emerging authors. Since its inception, the Festival has hosted authors such as: veteran writer/broadcaster Sir Mark Tully, Man Booker Prize winners Kiran Desai and Aravind Adiga, Tash Aw, Pankaj Mishra, Xiaolu Guo, Romesh Gunesekera, Kamila Shamsie, Daniyal Mueenuddin, Nadeem Aslam, Mohsin Hamid, Mohammed Hanif, Sarfraz Manzoor, Michael Wood, Will Hutton, William Dalrymple, Amitav Ghosh, former UN Under-Secretary of State Shashi Tharoor, Xue Xinran, Amit Chaudhuri, Charles Allen, John Gittings, Chinese dissident writer Ma Jian, and Hardeep Singh Kohli.

== Asia House Festival of Asian Literature ==
=== 2010 programme ===
==== Festival features ====
Features include "Meet the Author" receptions after each event, Panel Discussions, Poetry, Podcast of all events, and a Children in Asia Series, .

==== Themes ====
Overall themes for 2010 relate to Change and Adaptation to 21st century issues, whether they be political, economic, social or cultural.

Debates and discussions in 2010 cover conflict in Kashmir, democracy and freedom in Asia, Afghanistan, migration and displacement, Persian Gulf economies, and the development of Pakistani fiction.

==== Authors ====
The Festival has grown to include events for both adults and children and encompassing music, travel, politics, business, cooking as well as fiction. Authors appearing in 2010 are: Fatima Bhutto, William Dalrymple, Yasmin Alibhai-Brown, Janine di Giovanni, Chang-rae Lee, Atiq Rahimi, Peter Marsden, Daljit Nagra, Moniza Alvi, Imtiaz Dharker, Kavita Jindal, Hirsh Sawhney, Glen Peters, Diane Wei Liang, Michael Booth, John Kampfner, Humphrey Hawksley, Basharat Peer, Victoria Schofield, Justine Hardy, Jaspreet Singh, Neel Mukherjee, Tishani Doshi, Nitasha Kaul, Azadeh Moaveni, Persian Gulf experts Christopher Davidson and Jim Krane, Ali Sethi, Aamer Hussein, Francis Pike and 2008 Man Asian Prize winner Miguel Syjuco.

==== Children's authors and artists ====
Elizabeth Laird, Seema Anand, Nilesh Mistry and Prodeepta Das.

==== Dates ====
The 2010 Asia House Festival of Asian Literature ran from 5–27 May 2010 at Asia House. Pre Festival events took place in March, April and June, 2010.

=== 2011 programme ===
==== Authors ====
Colin Thubron, Zaiba Malik, Nikesh Shukla, Tahmima Anam, Ching-He Huang, Prajwal Parajuly, Wendy Law Yone, Moni Mohsin, Rachel Cusk, Mimi Khalvati, Ziba Karbassi, Stephen Watts, Mirza Waheed, Roma Tearne, Daisy Hasan, Tamara Chalabi, Ali Allawi, Angela Saini, Amanda Devi, Abdulrazak Gurnah, Tabish Khair, and Hanif Kureishi.

The 2011 Asia House Festival of Asian Literature will run from 10–26 May at Asia House.

== Asia House ==
Asia House is the home of the Festival of Asian Literature. Founded in 1996 by former UK diplomat Sir Peter Wakefield, it is the leading Pan-Asian organisation in the UK. A non-profit, non-political body, its geographical remit extends from the Persian Gulf in the West to Indonesia in the East.

Its mission is to “engage with the Century of Asia” by promoting a greater understanding of the distinctive and varied cultures, arts, religions, and commercial opportunities presented by the growing and vibrant countries of Asia.

In 2005, Asia House moved into its headquarters at 63 New Cavendish Street in Marylebone, Central London. Based in a listed, John Adam style 18th-century townhouse, featuring a gallery, library, café, and three reception rooms, it provides a focal point for people to meet and exchange ideas.
