= Maki Kureishi =

Pakistani poet (1927–1995)

Maki Kureishi (1927 Calcutta – Karachi 1995) was a Pakistani poet.

She taught at the University of Karachi for 30 years. She wrote in English. Noted British playwright Hanif Kureshi is her nephew.

== Works ==
- "For My Grandson", Drunken Boat 10
- The Far Thing. Oxford University Press. 1997. ISBN 978-0-19-577780-2.
- Kaleem Omar, ed. (1975). Wordfall: Three Pakistani Poets, Taufiq Rafat, Maki Kureishi, Kaleem Omar. Oxford University Press. ISBN 978-0-19-577217-3.

=== Anthologies ===
- Muneeza Shamsie, ed. (15 January 1998). A Dragonfly in the Sun: An Anthology of Pakistani Writing in English. OUP Pakistan. ISBN 978-0-19-577784-0.
