= The Body (Kureishi novel) =

Novella by Hanif Kureishi

First edition (publ. Faber and Faber)

The Body is the titular novella, published with seven other stories, in a 2003 collection by Hanif Kureishi. The narrator of the titular novella, Adam, is a British writer in his sixties who is given the chance to transfer his mind to a younger body, but then misses his wife and family.
