= My Son the Fanatic =

1998 short story by Hanif Kureishi

- 1998 standalone edition
- Author: Hanif Kureishi
- Language: English
- Genre: Short story
- Publisher: Faber and Faber
- Publication date: 1998 (standalone edition)
- Publication place: United Kingdom
- Media type: Print (Paperback)
- ISBN: 0-571-19234-3

My Son the Fanatic is a short story written by Hanif Kureishi first published in The New Yorker in 1994. It was reprinted in Kureishi's 1997 collection of short stories, Love in a Blue Time, and also as a supplement to some editions of The Black Album, and in 1998 as a standalone edition. The short story was also adapted into a film of the same title.

== Plot ==
The narrative deals with Parvez, a Pakistani immigrant in England, and his problems with his son Ali. Parvez worries about Ali's behaviour which has changed significantly. Early in the story, Parvez is afraid of discussing his worries with his friends because his son has always been a kind of showpiece son. Eventually, Parvez breaks his silence and tells them how his son has changed, hoping to receive some advice. After having a short conversation, they come to the conclusion that his son might be addicted to drugs and that he sells his things to earn money to buy drugs. After this meeting, Parvez goes to his taxi to drive home. But in his car he finds Bettina, a prostitute, who drives with Parvez very often and has become a confidante. Since Parvez has defended Bettina from a client who had attacked her, they take care of each other. Parvez tells Bettina what he has observed and that he and his friends assume that his son does all these strange things because he is drug addicted. Bettina instructs Parvez on how he has to observe his son to find out if there is anything physically wrong with him. However, after a few days of observations Parvez decides that his son appears totally healthy. The only physical change Parvez observes is that Ali is growing a beard. And it turns out that his son does not sell his things. He just gives them away.

Parvez notices that Ali prays five times a day, although he had not been brought up to be religious. Parvez decides to invite his son to dinner to talk to him about his recent behaviour. Initially, Ali refuses this invitation, but later he accepts it. Parvez drinks a lot during this meeting and they start to argue. Ali criticises his father's way of life because in his opinion his father is "too implicated in Western civilization" and breaks the Pakistani rules by drinking alcohol and eating pork.

Ali tells his father that he is going to give up his studies because, from his point of view, "Western education cultivates an anti-religious attitude". Parvez feels he has lost his son and wants to tell him to leave the house. But Bettina changes his mind and Parvez resolves to try to understand what is going on in his son's mind. During the next days Parvez tries to explain cautiously to his son what his ideas and attitudes towards life are. He even grows a beard to please Ali. But Ali still holds his father in contempt for not following the rules of the Qur'an. A few days later while Parvez is driving in his taxi with Bettina he sees his son walking down the sidewalk. Parvez asks Ali to come in and drive with them. In the car, Bettina starts to have a conversation with Ali, but as she tries to explain to Ali that his father loves him very much, Ali becomes angry and offends Bettina. Afterwards he wants to escape from the car, but Bettina prevents him. She leaves the car when it is still moving and runs away. Back at home Parvez drinks a lot of alcohol because he is furious at his son. He walks into Ali's room and attacks his son who does not show any kind of reaction to protect or defend himself. When Parvez stops hitting him, Ali asks his father: "So who's the fanatic now?"
