= The Black Album (play) =

The Black Album is the second novel written by British author Hanif Kureishi. Published in 1995 by Faber and Faber, the novel was adapted for the stage in 2009 and explores Muslim fundamentalism, youth culture, sex, drugs, and alienation in a young British-Pakistani man's world that is being pulled in different directions by a modern lifestyle of London and traditional Muslim culture.

Kureishi, a British-Pakistani novelist, playwright, screenwriter, and filmmaker, premiered the adaptation at the Royal National Theatre in July 2009 and was awarded the second Asia House Literature Award on the closing night of Asia House Festival of Asian Literature.

== Character List ==
- Shahid (Protagonist): The son of Pakistani immigrants, a British-Pakistani student from Kent, UK, whose father has recently died. Shahid moves to London for college, seeking to find a sense of independence in identity.
- Chili : Shahid's older brother
- Deedee : Shahid's lecturer professor/lover/mentor
- Riaz : Shahid's friend, and means of introduction into radical Islam

== Critical reception ==
Critical response to Hanif Kureishi’s stage adaptation of The Black Album (staged at the National Theatre’s Cottesloe in 2009) was mixed. In The Guardian, Michael Billington wrote that the adaptation retained “the bones” of the novel but lost “the thickness of texture” that had been part of the original’s appeal, adding that the stage version did “scant justice” to the novel’s broader portrait of late-1980s London. Writing for British Theatre Guide, Philip Fisher argued that the stage version was “overly-condensed” and that this compression reduced the intellectual depth of debate available in the novel form. A review in ArtsHub was also critical, suggesting the production relied on topicality while questioning aspects of its dramatic realisation.

The reception to the timing of the adaptation of the novel was positive as it came in the post-9/11 era of the world view. Kureishi had thought, back in the Nineties, of turning his novel into a film but it never happened. But a decade and a half on, in the wake of 9/11, 7/7 and the "war on terror", the relevance of the story became even greater. In an interview with the production team, it was asked: "Was it easy ... transforming the tale from page to stage? "The novel had a kaleidoscopic view of London," he says, "moving quickly from episode to episode. The play maintains that episodic sense. Hanif has retained a lot of the language of the original. The novel is full of deft wit. The play is too. It moves between the real and the absurd. Hanif calls it 'hyper-real'."
