= Peter Wakefield (diplomat) =

British diplomat and art fund director

Peter George Arthur Wakefield KBE CMG
- Born: 13 May 1922; London, England
- Died: 1 December 2010 (aged 88); Richmond, London, England
- Occupation: Diplomat

Sir Peter George Arthur Wakefield KBE CMG (13 May 1922 – 1 December 2010) was a British diplomat and art fund director. He served as a diplomat in Amman, Nicosia, Cairo, Vienna, Tokyo and Benghazi and as the United Kingdom's Ambassador in Lebanon and Belgium. Following his retirement from the diplomatic service, Wakefield was appointed director of the National Art Collections Fund.

He was educated at Cranleigh School and at Corpus Christi College, Oxford. He served in the Royal Artillery at the end of the Second World War and rose to the rank of captain. He joined the Foreign Office in 1949. He learned Arabic at the Middle East Centre for Arabic Studies in Lebanon, where he married Felicity Maurice-Jones, an artist working with Palestinian refugees, in 1951.

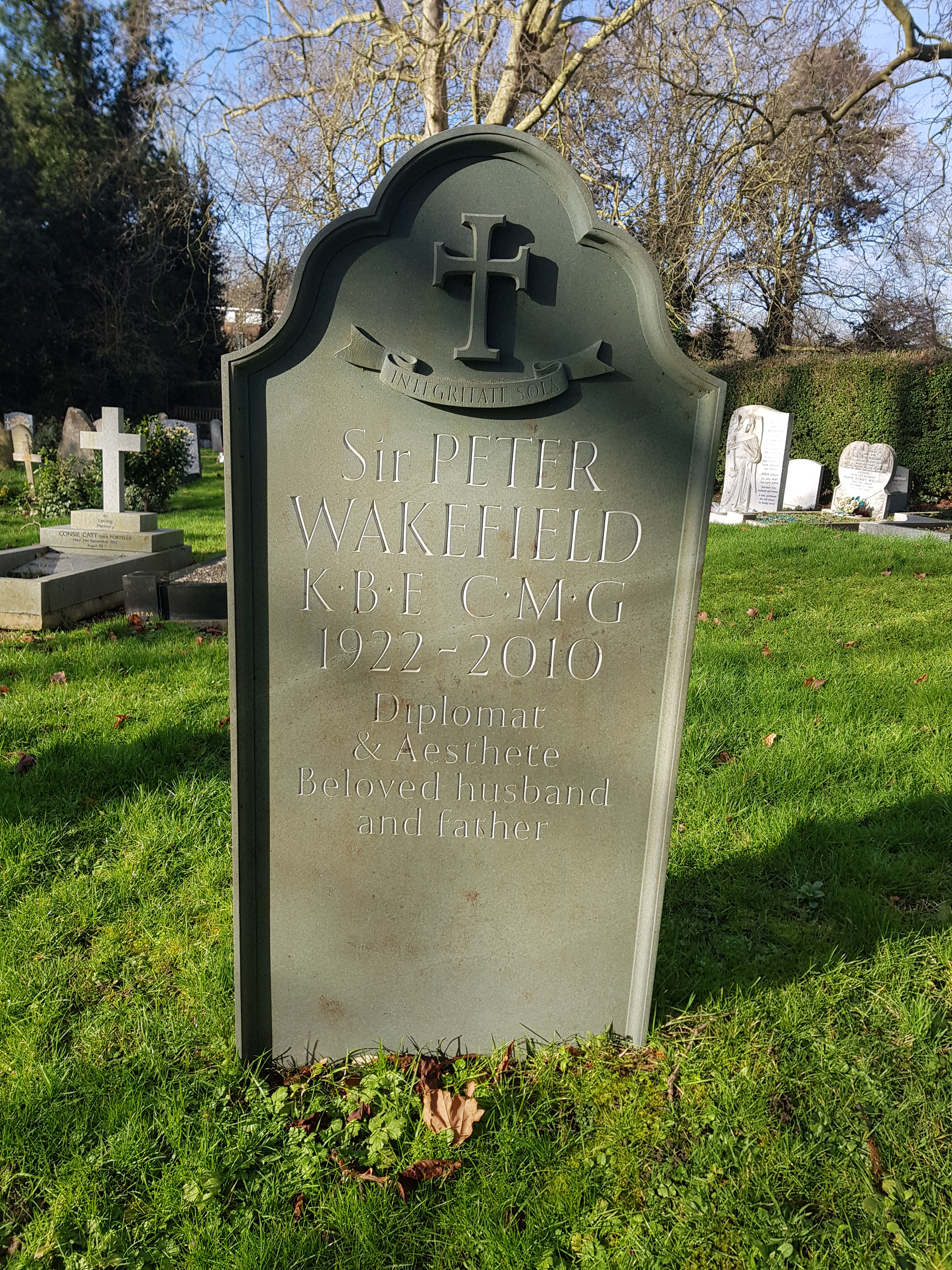
Richmond Cemetery

He was appointed CMG in 1973 and made a KBE in 1977.

He retained a deep interest in Asia, founding Asia House, the centre of expertise on Asia, in 1996.

He was a patron of Child In Need India (CINI).

He is buried in Richmond Cemetery.
