= Elizabeth: A Portrait in Parts =

- Release poster
- Directed by: Roger Michell
- Produced by: Kevin Loader
- Edited by: Joanna Crickmay
- Music by: George Fenton
- Production companies: Ingenious Media; Free Range Films
- Distributed by: Signature Entertainment
- Release date: 27 May 2022
- Running time: 90 minutes
- Country: United Kingdom
- Language: English

Elizabeth: A Portrait in Parts, released as Elizabeth: A Portrait in Part(s) in some territories, is a 2022 British documentary film about Queen Elizabeth II. The film was directed by Roger Michell. Released posthumously, it is the final film by Michell before his death.

== Overview ==
Composed entirely of archival recordings, the film depicts the life of Queen Elizabeth, from childhood to the later stages of her life.

== Reception ==
Elizabeth: A Portrait in Part(s) has an approval rating of 87% on review aggregator website Rotten Tomatoes, based on 23 reviews, and an average rating of 6.5/10. Metacritic assigned the film a weighted average score of 64 out of 100, based on 8 critics, indicating "generally favourable reviews".
