= The Yellow Handkerchief (2008 film) =

2008 American remake of a 1977 Japanese drama

- Theatrical release poster
- Directed by: Udayan Prasad
- Written by: Erin Dignam
- Based on: The Yellow Handkerchief by Yoji Yamada
- Produced by: Arthur Cohn
- Starring: William Hurt; Maria Bello; Kristen Stewart; Eddie Redmayne
- Cinematography: Chris Menges
- Edited by: Christopher Tellefsen
- Music by: Eef Barzelay; Jack Livesey
- Production company: Samuel Goldwyn Films
- Release dates: January 18, 2008 (Sundance); February 26, 2010 (United States)
- Running time: 102 minutes
- Country: United States
- Language: English
- Budget: $15.5 million
- Box office: $318,623

The Yellow Handkerchief is a 2008 American independent drama film. The film is a remake of the 1977 Japanese classic of the same name (幸福の黄色いハンカチ Shiawase no kiiroi hankachi, lit. The yellow handkerchief of happiness) directed by Yoji Yamada.

Set in the present-day American South, The Yellow Handkerchief stars William Hurt as Brett Hanson, an ex-convict who embarks on a road trip straight out of prison. Hanson hitches a ride with two troubled teens, Martine (Kristen Stewart) and Gordy (Eddie Redmayne), traversing post-Hurricane Katrina Louisiana in an attempt to reach his ex-wife and long-lost love, May (Maria Bello). Along the way, the three reflect on their existence, struggle for acceptance, and find their way not only through Louisiana but through life. Directed by Udayan Prasad and produced by Arthur Cohn, the film was shown at Sundance in 2008 and given a limited release on February 26, 2010, by Samuel Goldwyn Films.

== Plot ==
After being released from prison after six years, ex-convict Brett Hanson becomes lost in a new and unfamiliar world of freedoms and responsibilities. Struggling to reconcile himself with his disastrous past, he embarks on a journey to his home of south Louisiana to reunite with the ex-wife, May, who he left behind. Along this journey, he meets two teenagers: Martine, a troubled 15-year-old who has just escaped her family, and Gordy, a geeky outcast desperately seeking acceptance. Martine and Gordy offer to give Brett a lift home, and on the ensuing road trip the three reflect on their own personal misfit status while discovering in themselves and each other the acceptance each so deeply desires. Brett weighs whether to start a new life or rekindle his love with May – he's not sure she'll take him back – while Martine reevaluates her relationships with boys and her family and Gordy struggles with his affection for Martine.

== Cast ==
- William Hurt as Brett Hanson
- Kristen Stewart as Martine
- Maria Bello as May
- Eddie Redmayne as Gordy
- Kaori Momoi as Motel Owner
- Ashlynn Ross as Deliver Girl

== Production ==
The film is a remake of the 1977 film The Yellow Handkerchief, which in turn is based on the song Tie a Yellow Ribbon Round the Ole Oak Tree.

In 2003, producer Arthur Cohn obtained the remake rights for The Yellow Handkerchief from Japanese studio Shochiku.

Principal photography for the film took place in 2007 in Louisiana.

William Hurt prepared for his role by spending four days at Louisiana State Penitentiary at Angola, including a rare overnight for a volunteer in a maximum-security cell. In an interview, he said he'd also done "charitable work... periodically visit[ing] the prisons in Rockland County in New York State to take a program of hope and self-rehabilitation to the prisoners."

== Release ==
The film originally premiered at the 2008 Sundance Film Festival in the Premieres section. It was later given a one-week theatrical release at the end of the year in order to qualify for the Academy Awards.

Samuel Goldwyn Films acquired the film's distribution rights in 2009 but decided to hold the film from release to capitalize on Kristen Stewart's rising fame from the Twilight film series.

The film opened in limited release on February 26, 2010.

=== Box office ===
The film grossed $318,623 in 29 theaters in the United States.

== Reception ==
=== Critical response ===
The Yellow Handkerchief holds a 64% favorable rating on Rotten Tomatoes based on 50 reviews. The site's critics consensus reads, "Small and intimate -- occasionally to a fault -- The Yellow Handkerchief rises above its overly familiar ingredients thanks to riveting performances from William Hurt and Kristen Stewart." On Metacritic, the film has a weighted average score of 64 out of 100.
