= The Buddha of Suburbia (serial) =

1993 British TV series

- DVD cover
- Based on: The Buddha of Suburbia by Hanif Kureishi
- Screenplay by: Hanif Kureishi; Roger Michell
- Directed by: Roger Michell
- Starring: Naveen Andrews; Roshan Seth; Susan Fleetwood; Steven Mackintosh
- Composer: David Bowie
- Country of origin: United Kingdom
- Original language: English
- No. of series: 1
- No. of episodes: 4

Production
- Producer: Kevin Loader
- Cinematography: John McGlashan
- Editor: Kate Evans
- Running time: 55–60 minutes
- Production company: BBC Films

Original release
- Network: BBC Two
- Release: 3 November – 24 November 1993

The Buddha of Suburbia is a British four-part television serial, directed by Roger Michell, originally broadcast on BBC Two in November 1993. Based on the 1990 novel of the same name by Hanif Kureishi, the series starred Naveen Andrews as the main character, Karim Amir. Its theme song, as well as other original music for the series, was written and performed by David Bowie (this work also inspired Bowie's related 'soundtrack' album of the same name).

Unable to find distribution in America, the series was given a limited engagement screening at The Public Theater in Manhattan from December 1994 to January 1995.

== Overview ==
Karim Amir is a mixed-race 17-year-old who lives in a South London suburb during the 1970s. With an English mother and a Pakistani father, Karim is uncertain of his cultural identity. As his father becomes a kind of spiritual guru to the surrounding middle-class neighbours, Karim begins to explore his cultural roots with hopes that he will achieve sexual and racial self-realisation.

== Cast ==
- Naveen Andrews as Karim Amir
- Roshan Seth as Haroon Amir
- Susan Fleetwood as Eva Kay
- Steven Mackintosh as Charlie Kay
- Brenda Blethyn as Margaret Amir
- Harish Patel as Changez
- Nisha K. Nayar as Jamila
- David Bamber as Shadwell
- John McEnery as Uncle Ted
- Vicky Murdoch as Helen
- David Bradley as Helen's Father
- Jemma Redgrave as Eleanor
- Donald Sumpter as Matthew Pyke
- Jason Watkins as Terry
- Richard Leaf as Photographer
- Amanda Root as First TV Producer
- Mark Strong as Second TV Producer

== Production ==
=== Filming ===
Segments for the series were filmed at Naveen Andrews' old school Emanuel School. The extras used in the series were real punks, skinheads, suedeheads, hippies, and musicians cast by actress Barbie Wilde.

=== Music ===
The series features many songs from the seventies, as well as music written and performed specifically for the series by David Bowie. While a soundtrack album by Bowie was released under the same name on 8 November 1993, the music on the album is completely reworked, with the exception of the programme's theme song "The Buddha of Suburbia". A promotional music video was made for the song, featuring Bowie performing the song while strolling around the London suburb of Bickley as scenes from the series are intercut throughout. The rest of the original television soundtrack remained unreleased.
