= Roger Michell =

British film director (1956–2021)

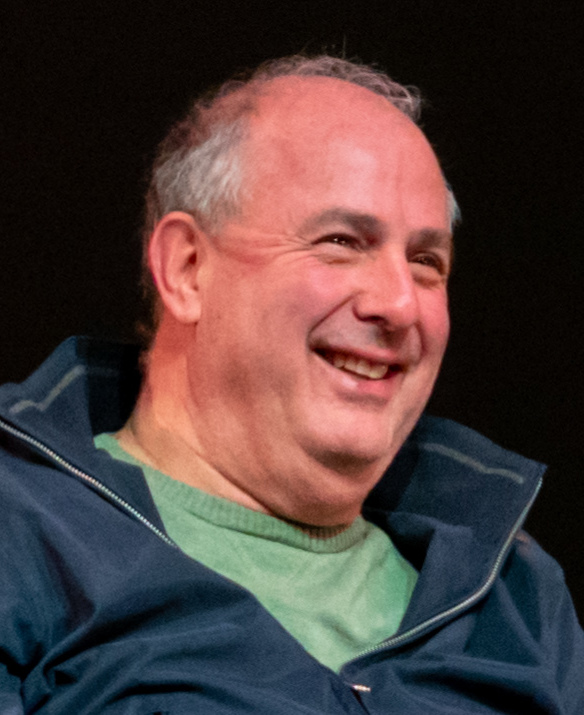
- Michell in 2019
- Born: 5 June 1956; Pretoria, Transvaal, Union of South Africa
- Died: 22 September 2021 (aged 65); Hitchin, England
- Occupation: Director
- Years active: 1977–2021
- Spouses: Kate Buffery (m. 1992; div. 2002); Anna Maxwell Martin (m. 2010; sep. 2020)
- Children: 4

Roger Harry Michell (5 June 1956 – 22 September 2021) was a British theatre, television and film director. He was best known for directing films such as Notting Hill and Venus, as well as the 1995 made-for-television film Persuasion.

== Early life and education ==
Roger Harry Michell was born on 5 June 1956 in Pretoria, Union of South Africa. He was not South African, as is sometimes mistakenly assumed, but was born there because his father was a British diplomat who had been posted to South Africa. On account of his father's job, Michell spent parts of his childhood in Beirut, Damascus, and Prague; he and his family were in Prague during the 1968 invasion.

He was educated at Clifton College in Bristol, where he began directing and writing short plays, before studying English at Queens' College, Cambridge, where he directed and acted in dozens of plays, winning both the RSC Buzz Goodbody Award for Best Student Director at the NSDF, and a Fringe First Award at the Edinburgh Fringe Festival for his play Private Dick. He graduated in 1977.

== Career ==
After leaving Cambridge, Michell moved to Brighton where he directed Peter Gill’s Small Change and other plays for the Brighton Actors Workshop. In 1978, under the RTDS scheme, he became an assistant director at the Royal Court Theatre where he assisted, amongst others, John Osborne, Max Stafford-Clark, and Samuel Beckett, and directed a number of plays in the Theatre Upstairs. Michell's contemporaries at the Court included Antonia Bird, Simon Curtis, Hanif Kureishi and, as his stage manager, Danny Boyle.

In 1979 he left the Royal Court Theatre and began writing and directing as a freelance, the most successful result of which was Private Dick, a comedy about Raymond Chandler co-written with Richard Maher, which opened at the Lyric Hammersmith to great reviews, and later moved to the West End with Robert Powell as Philip Marlowe.

In 1985, Michell joined the Royal Shakespeare Company where, as Resident Director for six years, he directed plays by Shakespeare, Havel, Nelson, Bond, Farquhar, Darke, and others, including Richard Nelson's Some Americans Abroad, which transferred to Broadway in 1990. In 1989, Michell was appointed the Judith E. Wilson Senior Fellow at Trinity College, Cambridge.

Michell was a graduate of the BBC Directors' Course, three-month course especially designed to help theatre directors understand the camera. Subsequently, his first piece of television was the three-part Leigh Jackson thriller Downtown Lagos, produced by Michael Wearing, which in turn led to the award-winning adaptation of Hanif Kureishi's autobiographical novel The Buddha of Suburbia, starring Naveen Andrews, which he scripted with the novelist. He followed that with the BBC film of Jane Austen’s Persuasion in 1995, widely regarded as one of the finest Austen adaptations, and winner of the 1995 BAFTA for Best Single Drama. Michell then directed My Night with Reg (1997), from the award-winning play that he had directed at the Royal Court and for a year in the West End. Next came Titanic Town (1998), a story set in Northern Ireland in the 1970s starring Julie Walters and Ciaran Hinds, and winner of Awards at Emden and Locarno.

Throughout the 1990s, Michell directed a number of productions at the National Theatre including Mustapha Matura's The Coup, Pinter's The Homecoming, Dylan Thomas’s Under Milk Wood, Joanna Murray Smith's Honour, Joe Penhall's Landscape With Weapon, Granville Barker's Waste, Nina Raine's Consent (subsequently at the Harold Pinter Theatre in the West End), and Blue/Orange with Bill Nighy, Andrew Lincoln, and Chiwetel Ejiofor, which won numerous awards and played in the West End for a year. Michell was subsequently sought out by Richard Curtis to direct his script Notting Hill, which became an award-winning smash hit and the greatest British Box Office success of all time. He then directed the 2002 critical box office success Changing Lanes starring Ben Affleck and Samuel L. Jackson.

For the next decade, Michell chose for personal reasons to work only in the UK, and in 2003 directed The Mother, his second collaboration with Hanif Kureishi, starring Anne Reid and Daniel Craig. Craig also starred in Michell's subsequent film, Enduring Love (2004), an adaptation of Ian McEwan's novel, before directing Peter O'Toole in 2006's Venus, again written by Kureishi. Their partnership became one of several important relationships with writers in both theatre and film, including Nick Darke, Joe Penhall, Joanna Murray Smith, and Nina Raine.

Michell was in negotiations to work with Craig yet again in 2006 on what became the James Bond film Quantum of Solace, but after months of unfruitful script conferences, and in spite of good relationships with the producers, he jumped ship. Michell later explained that he reached "tipping point" with producers Barbara Broccoli and Michael G Wilson, who were "desperate" to release the next 007 film in 2007, despite the lack of a script. This "freaked" Michell out, seeing a WGA writers’ strike fast-approaching, production gearing up, and still no proper script or story. The producers eventually delayed the film a year and eventually went ahead with Marc Forster at the helm.

He continued to work in theatre, at Hampstead Theatre with Richard Nelson's Farewell to the Theatre; at the Royal Court with Joe Penhall's Birthday, which he also filmed starring Stephen Mangan, and Nina Raine's Tribes; and at the Old Vic, Penhall's Mood Music, starring Ben Chaplin. His next film was 2010's Morning Glory, a comedy starring Rachel McAdams and Harrison Ford set in the world of morning news, produced by J. J. Abrams.

Michell then went on to direct Bill Murray playing Franklin D. Roosevelt in Hyde Park on Hudson (2012), for which he was nominated for a Golden Globe. Next came the multi-award-winning Le Week-End, another collaboration with Hanif Kureishi, starring Jim Broadbent and Lindsay Duncan, set and filmed in Paris. After working with Ellie Goulding on the mini rom-com How Long Will I Love You?, Michell directed the much-lauded two-part TV drama The Lost Honour of Christopher Jefferies, written by Peter Morgan, and telling the true-life story of a retired schoolteacher accused of murder. Jefferies was in fact not only innocent, but one of Michell's teachers at school. The film went on to win Michell a second BAFTA, as well as RTS and other awards.

Next came his own adaptation of Daphne du Maurier's novel My Cousin Rachel, starring Sam Claflin and Rachel Weisz; the acclaimed documentary Nothing Like a Dame for the BBC, featuring Joan Plowright, Maggie Smith, Eileen Atkins, and Judi Dench; the euthanasia-focused family drama Blackbird with Kate Winslet, Sam Neill, Susan Sarandon, Rainn Wilson, Mia Wasikowska, and Lindsay Duncan; and The Duke, with Helen Mirren and Jim Broadbent, which premiered to universal acclaim at the 2020 Venice Film Festival. His final film, Elizabeth: A Portrait in Parts, a documentary about Queen Elizabeth II, was released in 2022 for her Platinum Jubilee.

== Personal life and death ==
Michell was married to the actress Kate Buffery; they had two children.

After his divorce from Buffery, he married Anna Maxwell Martin. They had two daughters. Maxwell Martin confirmed in 2020 that she and Michell had separated.

Roger Michell died from a heart attack in Hitchin, Hertfordshire, on 22 September 2021, at the age of 65.

== Filmography ==
- Downtown Lagos (1992) (TV Mini Series)
- The Buddha of Suburbia (1993) (TV)
- The Buddha of Suburbia (1993) (David Bowie Music Video)
- Ready When You Are, Mr Patel (1995) (TV Documentary, episode of Omnibus)
- Persuasion (1995) (TV)
- My Night with Reg (1996)
- Titanic Town (1998)
- Notting Hill (1999)
- Changing Lanes (2002)
- The Mother (2003)
- Enduring Love (2004)
- Venus (2006)
- Morning Glory (2010)
- Hyde Park on Hudson (2012)
- How Long Will I Love You, Version 2 (2013) (Ellie Goulding Music Video)
- Le Week-End (2013)
- The Lost Honour of Christopher Jefferies (2014) (TV Mini Series)
- Birthday (2015) (TV film)
- My Cousin Rachel (2017)
- National Theatre Live: Consent (2017) (Film of play he also directed)
- Nothing Like a Dame (2018) (Documentary)
- Blackbird (2019)
- The Duke (2020)
- Elizabeth: A Portrait in Parts (2022)
