= Diane Wei Liang =

Chinese writer

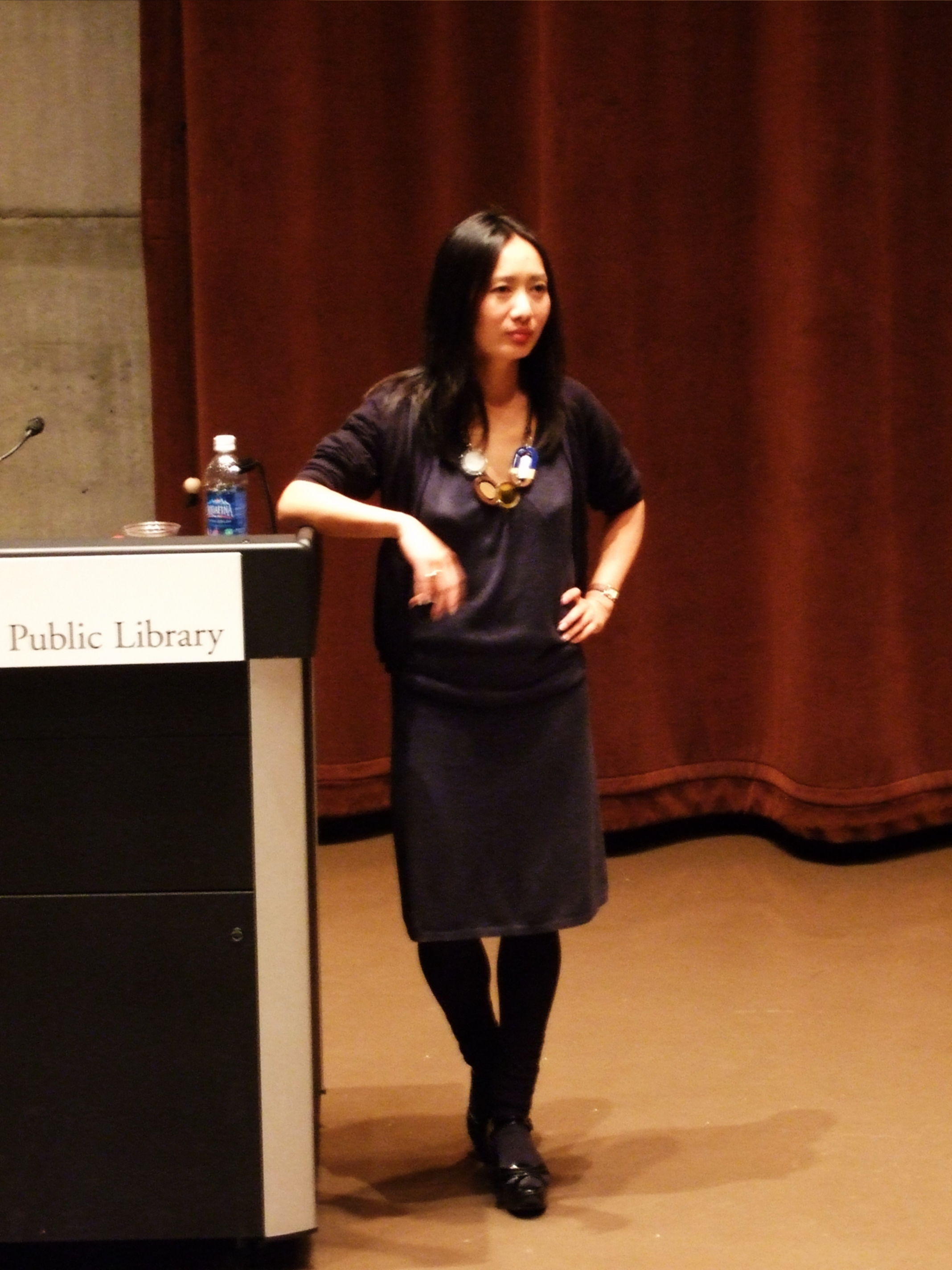
- Born: 1966 (age 59–60); Beijing
- Occupation: Writer
- Children: 2

Diane Wei Liang (born 1966) is a Chinese-born writer living in London.

== Life ==
Diane Wei Liang was born in 1966 in Beijing in the People's Republic of China to an official of the People's Liberation Army, a journalist and Chinese literature professor. Her parents were both college educated teachers so she spent some of her childhood in a labour and reeducation camp with her parents. In 1972 they moved back to live in a city and residency permits meant the family split.

She studied Psychology in Beijing University and completed her bachelor's degree there. But in 1989 she participated in the Student Democracy Movement, during which student leaders attempted to provoke the army. As a result of her involvement Liang was forced to flee China. Liang was able to leave because a passport application filed before the events began had been approved.

She continued studying in the United States in Carnegie Mellon University and selected the name Diana because of the Roman goddess. Liang graduated with a doctorate in Business Administration and began to teach in the United States, including in the University of Minnesota, and in the United Kingdom, at Royal Holloway College, University of London and Cranfield School of Management.

Her first book was begun while she was on maternity leave. It is autobiographical and was published in 2003. Liang is married to a German management consultant and lives in London. Her father and sister still live in China. Although she still visits China, Liang is no longer a Chinese citizen, holding instead both British and American citizenship.

== Bibliography ==
- Lake with no name: A true story of love and conflict in modern China – autobiography (2003).

=== Detective Mei Wang Series ===
- The Eye of Jade (2007). A Mei Wang Mystery, #1.
- Paper Butterfly (2008). A Mei Wang Mystery, #2.
- The House of Golden Spirit (2011). A Mei Wang Mystery, #3.
