= Pip Carter =

English actor

Pip Carter is an English actor.

== Career ==
Before starting his professional career, Carter trained at the Royal Academy of Dramatic Art (RADA) where he appeared in productions of The Cosmonaut's Last Message..., Platonov, In the Jungle of Cities, The Good Soldier and Assassins.

=== Theatre ===
Carter's work in theatre includes: Present Laughter and The Hour We Knew Nothing of Each Other at the National Theatre, London. He also appeared in Howard Brenton's new play, Never So Good at the National Theatre, London., David Hare's new play Gethsemane, also at the National Theatre, for which he was nominated as Best Supporting Actor in a Play in the Whatsonstage Theatregoers Choice Awards and in The White Guard at the National Theatre, London and Joseph K at the Gate Theatre, London. He appeared in Nina Raine's Tiger Country at the Hampstead Theatre in early 2011.

In 2016 he appeared as Sergei Voynitzev in Platonov and Medvedenko in The Seagull in the Young Chekhov season at the National Theatre. In 2017 he appeared in the premiere production of Consent at the Royal National Theatre, London.

== See also ==
- List of British actors
