= My Night with Reg =

1994 play by Kevin Elyot

- Original language: English
- Written by: Kevin Elyot
- Subject: Drama about gay manners and morals in the age of AIDS
- Genre: Comedy

Premiere
- Date: 31 March 1994
- Place: Royal Court Theatre; London

My Night with Reg is a play by British playwright Kevin Elyot which was produced in 1994 by the Royal Court Theatre, London, directed by Roger Michell. The production later transferred to the West End.

Set entirely among London's gay community in the mid-1980s against the background of the mounting AIDS crisis, My Night with Reg follows the ups and downs of a circle of gay friends over a period of several years. One of the group, the Reg mentioned in the title, is not a character in the play but the whole plot revolves around his apparent promiscuity and the chain reaction of deception and betrayal set off by it.

== Plot summary ==
All three scenes are set in the sitting room of Guy's London apartment: during Guy's flatwarming party (Scene 1); after Reg's funeral, some years later (Scene 2); and after Guy's funeral (Scene 3).

The group, most of them in their thirties, meet at irregular intervals, often at Guy's place. Guy himself is a lonely man. Ever since their university days, he has had a crush on John, but he has never dared to tell him about it. Rather, he lives a solitary life, which he only spices up with phone sex and an occasional visit to a gay pub – that is where he meets 18-year-old Eric, who then helps him decorate his new flat. On holiday on the island of Lanzarote, he meets a gay man who eventually forces himself on Guy and has unprotected sex with him. At his flatwarming party, he has just come back from his holiday and is still quite shocked about what happened. It is hard for him not to start crying when, as a present, John gives him a cookery book specialising in dishes for one.

The most popular of the gay circle is Reg, who is conspicuously absent from the party. Reg has had a long-term relationship with Daniel, but Daniel himself suspects Reg of occasionally being unfaithful to him. In fact Reg seems to be sleeping with every man he can get hold of (as it seems, even with the vicar). In the course of the play, John, Benny and even his seemingly faithful companion Bernie have secret sex with Reg. They all confide in Guy. It hurts Guy most to hear that John – whom he himself fancies – is having an affair with Reg, thus betraying their mutual friend Daniel. After his fling with Reg, Benny panics because he thinks he might have contracted HIV, but he does not confess it to his partner, Bernie.

When Reg is dying from AIDS, he is looked after by his partner, Daniel. The next one to die is Guy, the only one who has not had sex with Reg and who seems to have been infected with HIV when he was raped during his holiday in Lanzarote. Guy bequeaths his new flat to the love of his life, John who does not need it at all because he comes from a rich background. It is John who, somewhere in the flat, finds all kinds of memorabilia dating back to their student days.

The play serves as a "tip of the hat" to iconic musician Sir Elton John, with the names of all the characters being part of Eltoniana: Reg (Elton's birth name); Daniel, Benny, Guy (all from Elton John hit songs), John (the singer's appropriated surname, his homage to Long John Baldry), and Bernie (the Christian name of Elton's longtime lyricist, Bernie Taupin). Eric may be a reference to Eric Clapton, with whom John toured in 1992. Daniel gives Guy a recipe book by a Gertrude Pinner, a reference to the town in which Elton John grew up.

== Awards and nominations ==
Awards

- 1994 Evening Standard Award for Best Comedy
- 1994 Writers' Guild Award for Best Fringe Play
- 1995 Olivier Award for Best Comedy
- 2015 Olivier Award for Best Revival
