= The Buddha of Suburbia (song) =

1993 single by David Bowie

Single by David Bowie featuring Lenny Kravitz

from the album The Buddha of Suburbia
- B-side: "Dead Against It"
- Released: 22 November 1993
- Studio: Mountain (Montreux)
- Genre: Rock
- Length: 4:24
- Label: Arista
- Songwriter: David Bowie
- Producers: David Bowie; David Richards

David Bowie singles chronology
"Miracle Goodnight" (1993)	"The Buddha of Suburbia" (1993)	"The Hearts Filthy Lesson" (1995)

Lenny Kravitz singles chronology
"Heaven Help" (1993)	"The Buddha of Suburbia" (1993)	"Is There Any Love in Your Heart" (1993)

Music video
- "The Buddha of Suburbia" on YouTube

"The Buddha of Suburbia" is the theme song to the BBC TV series of the same name, released by British musician David Bowie in November 1993 by Arista Records. It was re-recorded with American musician Lenny Kravitz for Bowie's 19th studio album, also titled The Buddha of Suburbia (1993), and inspired by his musical score for the series. The single reached No. 35 on the UK Singles Chart.

== Background ==
One of the few tracks from the series that was actually retained unchanged for the album, its nostalgic lyrics were matched by a sound that was something of a pastiche of Bowie's past work, while retaining a fresh sound. Two places in the song there are references to older Bowie songs, the guitar break from "Space Oddity" and the line "Zane, zane, zane, ouvre le chien" from "All the Madmen".

Confusingly, several different versions of the song were released, some with no differentiation in title.

Album track No. 1 ("Buddha of Suburbia") does not feature Lenny Kravitz. Album track No. 10 does feature him, but is not titled any differently from album track No. 1, although he is credited in the liner notes.

CD single track No. 4 is labelled "Buddha of Suburbia (Rock Mix)", but it is the same as album track No. 10. Single track No. 1 is labelled just "Buddha of Suburbia" but does show "featuring Lenny Kravitz on guitar" in the credits. A careful comparison shows that this track is primarily the same as album track No. 1, but has the ending section of album track No. 10 (featuring Lenny Kravitz) instead of the original ending from album track No. 1.

To add additional confusion, a couple of seconds of "noise" appear at the end of Track No. 1 on the album version. It doesn't appear on the end of the song on any of the single versions of it and the 2007 remaster/reissue of the album moves it to the beginning of Track No. 2 instead.

This single was promoted by a video featuring Bowie performing the song while strolling around an English suburb, intercut with scenes from the series.

== Controversy ==
The song caused minor controversies on both sides of the Atlantic, with Radio 1 making an airplay edit to cover up the word "bullshit" in the lyric, and US networks re-edited the video to remove shots where Bowie was smoking a cigarette.

== Critical reception ==
The Stud Brothers from Melody Maker said, "Not a bad single, Bowie plundering his glory years to find something of the lushness of "Young Americans" and a little of the studied weirdness of "Heroes". It works as any composite might." Alan Jones from Music Week wrote, "The TV series is based in the Seventies, and Bowie's title song is evocative of both the period and his work from then. Its unusual lyrics may cause problems on radio, but it's still commercial and compelling."

== Track listing ==
All tracks written by David Bowie.

=== 7" vinyl single ===
- UK, Germany, Netherlands: Arista-BMG / 74321 17705 7

Side one
No.	Title	Length
1.	"Buddha of Suburbia"	4:24

Side two
No.	Title	Length
1.	"Dead Against It"	5:48

=== Cassette single ===
- UK, Germany, Netherlands: Arista-BMG / 74321 17705 4

Side one
No.	Title	Length
1.	"Buddha of Suburbia"	4:24
2.	"Dead Against It"	5:48

Side two
No.	Title	Length
1.	"Buddha of Suburbia"	4:24
2.	"Dead Against It"	5:48

=== CD single ===
- UK, Germany, Netherlands: Arista-BMG / 74321 17705 2

No.	Title	Length
1.	"Buddha of Suburbia"	4:24
2.	"South Horizon"	5:26
3.	"Dead Against It"	5:48
4.	"Buddha of Suburbia (Rock Mix)"	4:24

=== Collectors edition CD single ===
Collectors edition with a holographic CD.

- UK: Arista-BMG / 74321 18168 2

No.	Title	Length
1.	"Buddha of Suburbia"	4:24
2.	"Dead Against It"	5:48

== Personnel ==
- David Bowie – vocals, keyboards, guitar, synthesizers, saxophone, production
- Lenny Kravitz – guitar on "The Buddha of Suburbia"
- Erdal Kızılçay – bass, drums, keyboards, percussion, trumpet
- David Richards – production

== Charts ==
Chart (1993)	Peak position
UK Singles Chart (OCC)	35
UK Airplay (Music Week)	39
