= Hanif Kureishi =

British playwright (born 1954)

Hanif Kureishi CBE
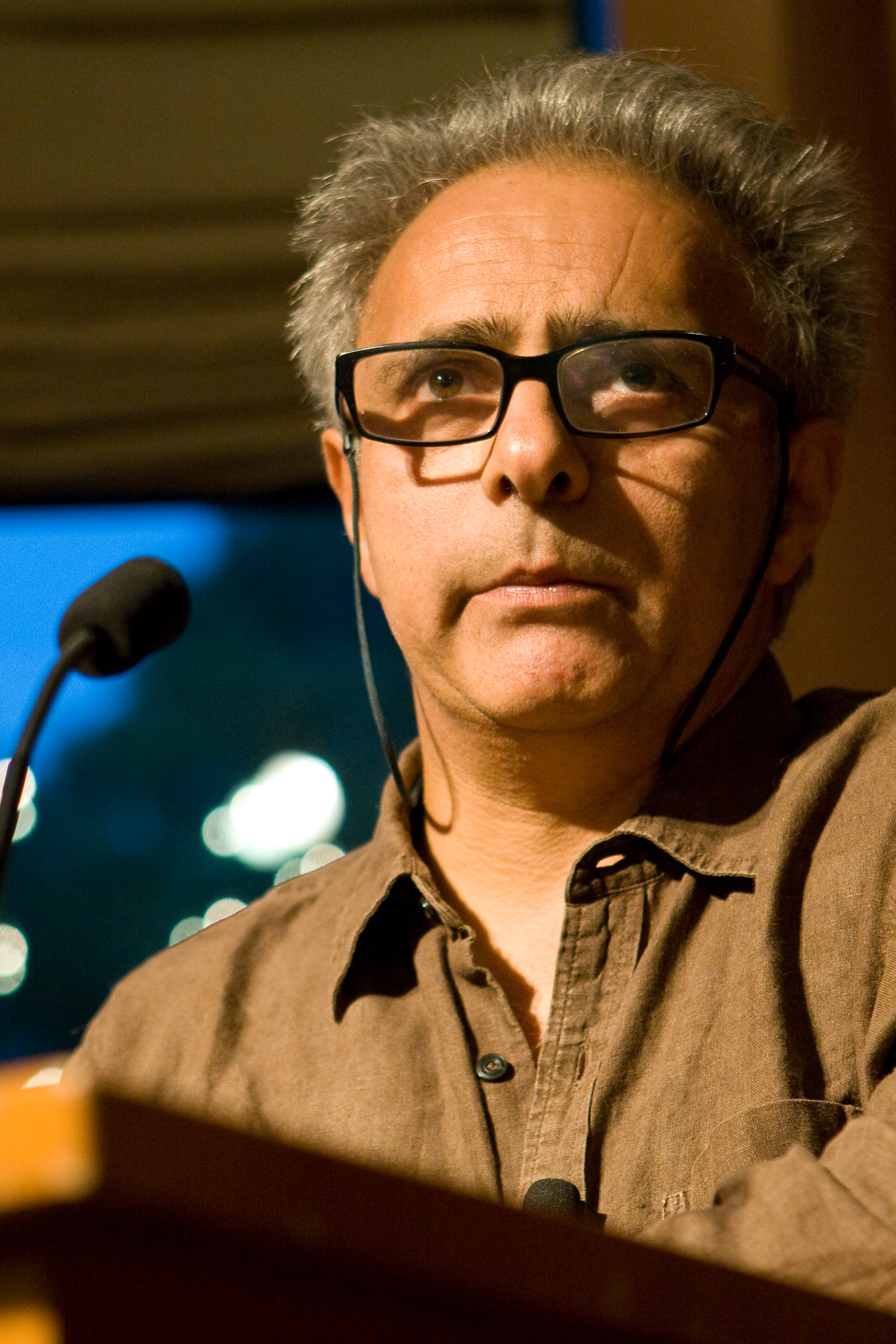
- Kureishi in 2008
- Born: 5 December 1954 (age 71); Bromley, Kent, England
- Education: Bromley College of Technology; Lancaster University; King's College London
- Occupations: Playwright, screenwriter, novelist
- Children: 3
- Writing career
- Period: 1976–present
- Notable works: My Beautiful Laundrette; The Buddha of Suburbia
- Movement: Postcolonial literature

Signature
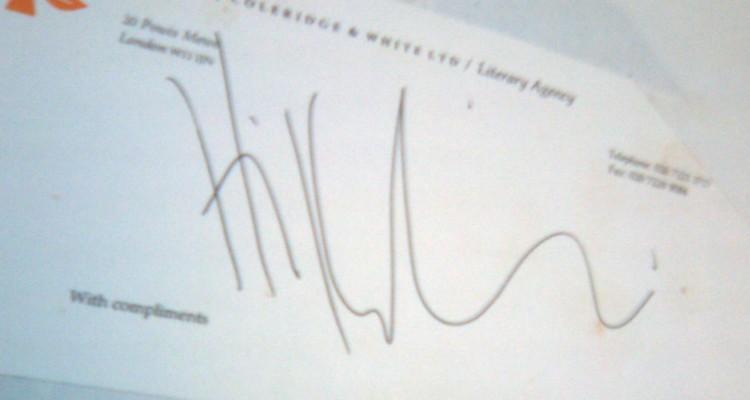

Hanif Kureishi CBE (born 5 December 1954) is a British playwright, screenwriter and novelist.

He wrote the screenplay for Stephen Frears's My Beautiful Laundrette (1985), earning Academy Award and BAFTA Award nominations for Best Original Screenplay. He is also known for his novel The Buddha of Suburbia (1990), which was adapted into a four-part BBC drama series.

Following a spinal injury in 2022, he wrote Shattered (2024) to wide acclaim. The book was a finalist for the 2025 National Book Critics Circle Award for Autobiography.

== Early life and education ==
He was born in Bromley to an English mother, Audrey Buss, and a father, Rafiushan (Shanoo) Kureishi, who had left India in his early twenties; Kureishi has written that his father worked for much of his adult life at the Pakistan High Commission in London, and that the family background was shaped by the 1947 Partition.

His father was from a wealthy family based in Madras (now Chennai), whose members moved to Pakistan after the Partition of India in 1947. Rafiushan's father was a colonel and doctor in the British Indian Army. Rafiushan attended the Cathedral School in Bombay (now Mumbai), the same school attended by Salman Rushdie. The family was later close to the Bhuttos. Rafiushan's brother (Hanif's uncle), Omar Kureishi, was a newspaper columnist and manager of the Pakistan cricket team.

Rafiushan travelled to the UK in 1950 to study law, but ran out of money and took a desk job at the Pakistani high commission instead. There, he met his wife-to-be. He wanted to be a writer but his ambitions were frustrated, with his submissions to publishers turned down.

Hanif Kureishi attended Bromley Technical High School and studied for A-levels at Bromley College of Technology. While at this college, he was elected student union president in 1972. Some of the characters from his semi-autobiographical novel The Buddha of Suburbia are drawn from this period.

He spent a year studying philosophy at Lancaster University, then withdrew. He later attended King's College London and earned a degree in philosophy.

== Career ==
Kureishi started his career in the 1970s as a pornography writer, under the pseudonyms Antonia French and Karim.

He went on to write plays for the Hampstead Theatre, Soho Poly, and by the age of 18, was with the Royal Court.

He wrote My Beautiful Laundrette in 1985, about a gay Pakistani-British boy growing up in 1980s London, for a film directed by Stephen Frears. The screenplay's depiction of racist hostility drew on Kureishi's own experiences of racism at school; he has said that he was "literally the only brown person" at his high school and was subjected to racist abuse.

The film won the New York Film Critics Circle Award for Best Screenplay and received an Academy Award nomination for Best Original Screenplay. He also wrote the screenplay for Sammy and Rosie Get Laid (1987).

His novel The Buddha of Suburbia (1990) won the Whitbread Award for Best First Novel and was later adapted into a BBC television serial, with a soundtrack composed by David Bowie.

In 1991, his feature film London Kills Me, which he wrote and directed, was released.

Kureishi's novel Intimacy (1998) follows a man preparing to leave his partner and their two young children after feeling emotionally and physically rejected. The novel attracted controversy and was widely read as at least semi-autobiographical, in light of reports that Kureishi had recently left his then partner, Tracey Scoffield, and their twin sons.

In 2001, Kureishi's work was adapted into the film Intimacy, directed by Patrice Chéreau; the film won the Golden Bear at the Berlin International Film Festival, and its lead actor Kerry Fox received the Silver Bear for Best Actress. The book was translated into Persian by Niki Karimi; a Persian-language edition (Nzdiky) is catalogued as published in Tehran by Tofiq Afrin in 1383 (2004–2005).

Kureishi's drama The Mother was adapted as a film by Roger Michell, released in 2003. It tells the story of a cross-generational relationship with a reversal of expected roles: a 70-year-old English grandmother seduces her daughter's boyfriend.

Kureishi wrote the screenplay for Venus (2006), a film starring Peter O'Toole. A novel titled Something to Tell You was published in 2008.

His 1995 novel The Black Album, adapted for the theatre, was performed at the National Theatre in July and August 2009.

In May 2011, he was awarded the second Asia House Literature Award on the closing night of the Asia House Festival of Asian Literature, where he discussed his Collected Essays (Faber).

Kureishi has also written non-fiction, including an autobiography, My Ear at His Heart. In it, he describes his relationship with his father, Rafiushan, who died in 1991.

Major influences on Kureishi's writing include P.G. Wodehouse and Philip Roth.

His work has often been cited in academic studies of postcolonial literature and British cultural identity, with My Beautiful Laundrette and The Buddha of Suburbia in particular becoming set texts in university curricula in the UK, US, and Australia. Scholars have highlighted his blending of comedy, sexuality, and racial politics as both groundbreaking and controversial, with critics noting that Kureishi's characters often challenge stereotypes of British Asians while also reflecting the tensions of assimilation and cultural hybridity.

In 2024, the BBC aired In My Own Words, a documentary directed by Nigel Williams that traced Kureishi's life and career using archival footage and new interviews. The same year, Shattered was shortlisted for the James Tait Black Memorial Prize for Biography, with judges praising its "unflinching insight into vulnerability and resilience."

== Other activities ==
In October 2013, Kureishi was appointed as a professor in the creative writing department at Kingston University in London, where he was a writer in residence.

== Personal life ==
Kureishi was living in West London in 2016. His entry in Who's Who lists his recreations as "music, cricket, sitting in pubs".

Although he acknowledges his father's Pakistani roots, Kureishi rarely visits Pakistan. A 2012 visit sponsored by the British Council was his first trip to Pakistan in 20 years. Kureishi's uncle was the writer, columnist and Pakistani cricket commentator and team manager Omar Kureishi. The poet Maki Kureishi was his aunt.

He is bisexual. He has twin boys from his relationship with film producer Tracey Scoffield and a younger son from a previous relationship.

Kureishi's family have accused him of exploiting them with thinly disguised references in his work, with his sister Yasmin writing a letter to The Guardian about it. She says that his descriptions of her family's working-class roots are fictitious, and their father was not a bitter old man. Yasmin takes issue with her brother for his thinly-disguised autobiographical references in his first novel The Buddha of Suburbia, as well as for the image of his own past that he portrays in newspaper interviews. Hanif's father felt that Hanif had robbed him of his dignity in The Buddha of Suburbia, and did not speak to him for many months. There was further furore with the publication of Intimacy, as the story was assumed to be autobiographical.

In early 2013, Kureishi lost his life savings in a suspected fraud.

In 2014, the British Library announced that it would be acquiring the archive of Kureishi's documents spanning 40 years of his writing life. The body of work was to include diaries, notebooks and drafts.

On 26 December 2022, Kureishi fell while on holiday in Rome, sustaining spinal injuries that left him tetraplegic and unable to move his limbs. He has described experiencing a near-death state in the minutes after the fall and credited his partner, Isabella d'Amico, with helping him remain calm until emergency services arrived. Following surgery and a long rehabilitation, Kureishi began documenting his recovery in a widely read Substack blog, later collected in his 2024 memoir Shattered, which interweaves diary entries, reflections on disability, and commentary on the creative process after physical trauma.

In September 2024, the BBC released a biographical documentary "In My Own Words" by his close friend Nigel Williams in which the writer revisits his life and career via the medium of old archive footage.

== Recognition, awards and honours ==
Kureishi was appointed Commander of the Order of the British Empire (CBE) in the 2008 New Year Honours for services to Literature and Drama. In the same year, The Times included Kureishi in its list of the 50 greatest British writers since 1945. He was also elected a Fellow of the Royal Society of Literature in 2008.

He has also won a number of literary awards, including:

- 1980 Thames Television Playwright Award, The Mother Country
- 1981 George Devine Award, Outskirts
- 1986 New York Film Critics Circle Award for Best Screenplay for My Beautiful Laundrette
- 1986 Nomination for the BAFTA Award for Best Original Screenplay for My Beautiful Laundrette
- 1987 Nomination for the Academy Award for Best Original Screenplay for My Beautiful Laundrette
- 1990 Whitbread First Novel Award, The Buddha of Suburbia
- 2007 National Short Story Competition, shortlist for "Weddings and Beheadings"
- 2010 PEN/Pinter Prize
- 2013 Outstanding Achievement in the Arts at The Asian Awards

== Works ==
=== Novels ===
- 1990 The Buddha of Suburbia, London: Faber and Faber
- 1995 The Black Album, London: Faber and Faber
- 1998 Intimacy, London: Faber and Faber
- 2001 Gabriel's Gift, London: Faber and Faber
- 2003 The Body, London: Faber and Faber
- 2008 Something to Tell You, London: Faber and Faber
- 2014 The Last Word, London: Faber and Faber
- 2017 The Nothing, London: Faber and Faber
- 2019 What Happened?, London: Faber and Faber

=== Story collections ===
- 1997 Love in a Blue Time, London: Faber and Faber
- 1999 Midnight All Day, London: Faber and Faber
- 2019 "She Said, He Said", The New Yorker

=== Collection of stories and essays ===
- 2011 Collected Essays, Faber and Faber
- 2015 Love + Hate: Stories and Essays, Faber & Faber

=== Plays and screenplays ===
- 1980: The King and Me, London: Faber and Faber
- 1981: Outskirts, London: Faber and Faber
- 1981: Borderline, London: Faber and Faber
- 1983: Birds of Passage, London: Faber and Faber
- 1988: Sammy and Rosie Get Laid, London: Faber and Faber
- 1991: London Kills Me, London: Faber and Faber
- 1996: My Beautiful Laundrette and other writings, London: Faber and Faber
- 1997: My Son the Fanatic, London: Faber and Faber
- 1999: Hanif Kureishi Plays One, London: Faber and Faber
- 1999: Sleep with Me, London: Faber and Faber
- 2002: Collected Screenplays Volume I, London: Faber and Faber
- 2003: The Mother, London: Faber and Faber
- 2004: When The Night Begins, London: Faber and Faber
- 2007: Venus, London: Faber and Faber
- 2009: The Black Album (adapted from the novel), London: Faber and Faber

=== Nonfiction ===
- 2002: Dreaming and Scheming: Reflections on Writing and Politics, London: Faber and Faber
- 2004: My Ear at His Heart, London: Faber and Faber
- 2005: The Word and the Bomb , London: Faber and Faber
- 2014: A Theft: My Con Man , London: Faber and Faber
- 2024: Shattered: A Memoir, London: Penguin

=== As editor ===
- 1995: The Faber Book of Pop. London: Faber and Faber

=== Screenplays ===
- 1985: My Beautiful Laundrette
- 1987: Sammy and Rosie Get Laid
- 1991: London Kills Me (and director)
- 1993: The Buddha of Suburbia (television miniseries, based on the novel)
- 1997: My Son the Fanatic (based on his own short story of the same title)
- 1999: The Escort (with Michel Blanc)
- 2003: The God of Small Tales (short) (with Akram Khan)
- 2003: The Mother (adapted from the play)
- 2006: Venus
- 2007: Weddings and Beheadings (2007)
- 2013: Le Week-End

=== Story basis only ===
- 2001: Intimacy

=== Producer ===
- 2006: Souvenir

== See also ==
- List of British Pakistanis
- List of British playwrights
- List of Academy Award winners and nominees from Great Britain
