= The Buddha of Suburbia (novel) =

1990 novel by Hanif Kureishi

- First edition
- Author: Hanif Kureishi
- Cover artist: Peter Blake
- Language: English
- Genre: Theatre-fiction
- Publisher: Faber and Faber
- Publication date: 1990
- Publication place: United Kingdom
- Media type: Print (hardback & paperback)
- Pages: 284
- ISBN: 0-571-14274-5
- OCLC: 59164181

The Buddha of Suburbia is a 1990 novel by British author Hanif Kureishi, which won the Whitbread Award for the best first novel. The novel has been translated into 20 languages and was also made into a four-part drama series by the BBC in 1993.

== Plot ==
The Buddha of Suburbia centers around Karim Amir, a bisexual mixed-race teenager who is desperate to escape suburban South London and to have new experiences in London in the 1970s. He eagerly seizes an unlikely opportunity when a life in the theatre presents itself as a possibility. When there is nothing left for him to do in London, he goes to New York for ten months. Returning to London, he takes on a part in a TV soap opera and the book leaves its reader on the brink of the 1979 general election (the defeat of Jim Callaghan's government on a motion of no confidence is specifically mentioned later in the novel).

Through his work with two theatre companies, Karim gets to know new people from completely different backgrounds, like the working-class Welshman Terry, who is an active Trotskyist and wants him to join the party, or Karim's lover Eleanor, who is upper middle class but pretends to be working class. Mixing with the people surrounding Eleanor and Pyke (a strange theatre director), he realises that they are speaking a different language because they received a good education, which was not valued in the suburbs.

Other characters and their struggles to make it in London are described, too. Kureishi portrays Eva as a social climber at war with the city: "Eva was planning her assault on London. […] she was not ignored by London once she started her assault. She was climbing ever higher, day by day. […] As Eva started to take London, moving forward over the foreign fields of Islington, Chiswick and Wandsworth inch by inch, party by party, contact by contact". Later in the novel, Karim's father Haroon (an Indian immigrant, a boring bureaucrat living with his family in a grey London suburb) is suddenly discovered by London's high society, which is hungry for exotic distractions, and so he becomes their Buddha-like guru, though he himself does not believe in this role. His son does not believe in him either and, at the same time, has his first erotic experiences.

== Style ==
Due to the orality in The Buddha, the historical events, and the many dialogues full of colloquialism, the reader gets the impression of realism. The novel is highly episodic; Kureishi uses juxtaposition and collage. The suburbs are "a leaving place" from which Kureishi's characters must move away. To Karim, London—even though it is geographically not far away from his home—seems like a completely different world. Therefore, his expectations of the city are great.

In The Buddha the move into (and later through) the city is like an odyssey or pilgrimage. On the first page Karim introduces himself as follows: "My name is Karim Amir, and I am an Englishman born and bred, almost". This motif is reinforced throughout the novel.

Pop music is an important theme in Kureishi's novels. One could even say that his novels have a soundtrack. London itself is associated by Karim to a sound. "There was a sound that London had. It was, I'm afraid, people in Hyde Park playing bongos with their hands; there was also the keyboard on The Doors' "Light My Fire". There were kids in velvet cloaks who lived free lives". Within the problems of prejudice and racism lies one of the themes of initiation novels: the question of identity. Furthermore, London seems to be the perfect setting for the protagonists' "often painful growth towards maturity through a range of conflicts and dilemmas, social, sexual and political." (Bart Moore-Gilbert, 2001, 113) These characterisations mark Kureishi's novels as examples of Bildungsromane and novels of initiation.

Even though The Buddha is set in the 1970s and ends just before the Thatcher era begins, Kureishi was writing it under the direct influence of the outcome of Thatcherism. It is not surprising then, looking back, that he can see the roots of Thatcherite conservatism already in the '70s.

Central themes in The Buddha of Suburbia include the search for identity, the tensions between social classes, and the complexities of cultural hybridity in postcolonial Britain. Karim’s journey reflects the dissonance between his suburban upbringing and his aspirations in cosmopolitan London. As Moore-Gilbert notes, the novel’s depiction of 1970s Britain reveals "the fractures and possibilities of a society negotiating race, class, and sexual politics." The weaving of pop culture, political change, and personal ambition frames the novel as both a Bildungsroman and a commentary on British identity.

== Awards and recognition ==
In 1990 The Buddha of Suburbia won the Whitbread Award for the best first novel. In 2009 Wasafiri magazine placed the novel on its list of 25 Most Influential Books published in the previous quarter-century.
