= London in fiction =

Works of fiction set in London, England

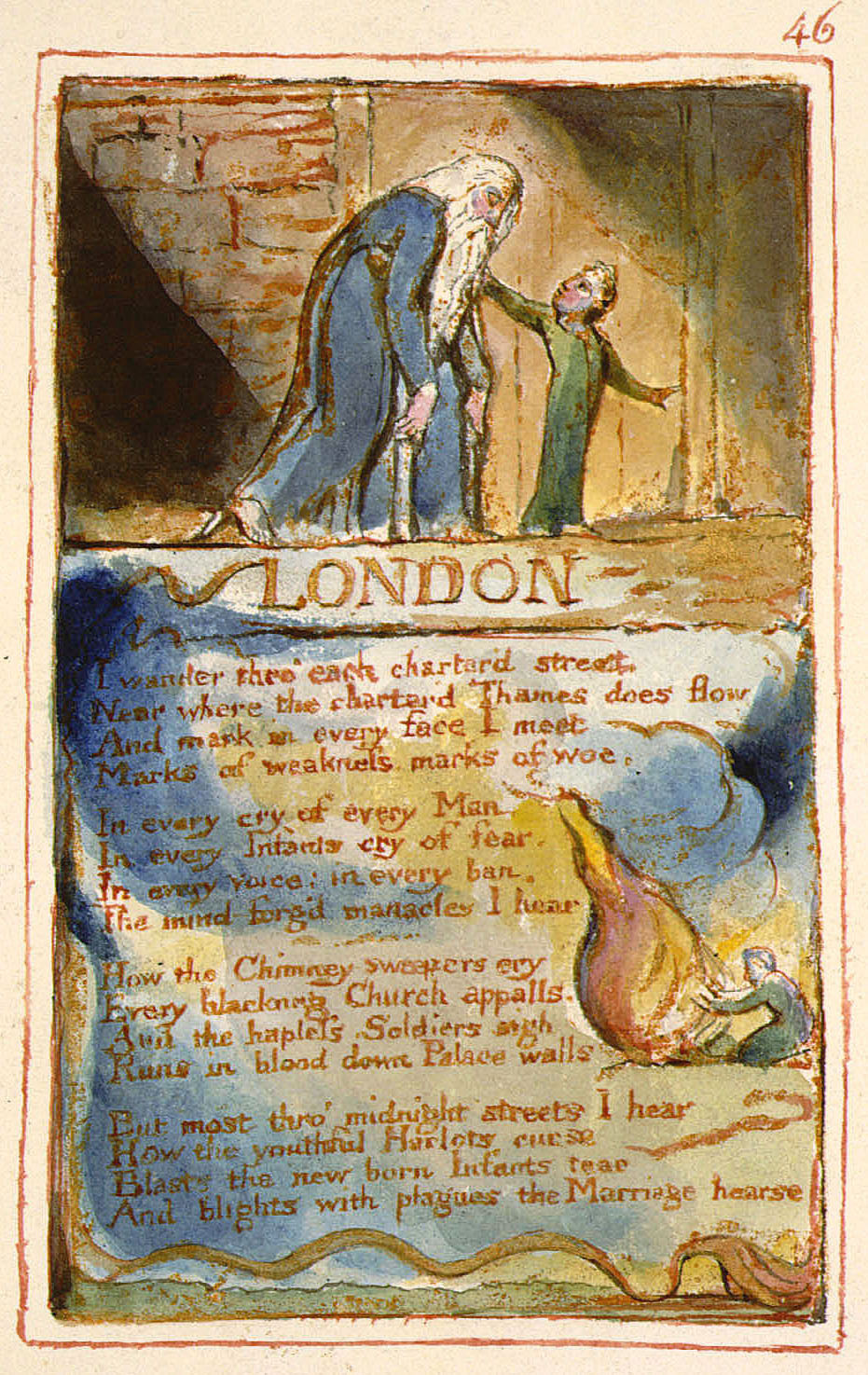
William Blake's poem London, which explores the meaning of the city. This image is a digital repercussion of his hand-painted 1826 print from Copy AA of Songs of Innocence and of Experience. The item is currently in the Collection of the Fitzwilliam Museum, Cambridge, England.

Many notable works of fiction are set in London, the capital city of England and of the United Kingdom. The following is a selection; there are too many such fictional works for it to be possible to compile a complete list.

== Folklore ==
- Dick Whittington and His Cat (c. 1354–1423)

== Early fiction ==
- Geoffrey Chaucer — The Canterbury Tales (late 14th century)
- Daniel Defoe — A Journal of the Plague Year (1722), Moll Flanders (1722)

== 19th century fiction ==
- Many of Charles Dickens' most famous novels are at least partially set in London; including: Oliver Twist (1838), The Old Curiosity Shop (1840), A Christmas Carol (1843), David Copperfield (1850), Bleak House (1853), Little Dorrit (1857), A Tale of Two Cities (1859), Great Expectations (1861), Our Mutual Friend (1865), and The Mystery of Edwin Drood (1870)
- William Makepeace Thackeray — Vanity Fair (1847)
- Mark Twain — The Prince and the Pauper (1881)
- Henry James — The Princess Casamassima (1886), A London Life (1888), What Maisie Knew (1897), In the Cage (1898)
- Oscar Wilde — The Picture of Dorian Gray (1891)
- H. G. Wells — The Invisible Man (1897), The War of the Worlds (1898)

== 20th century fiction ==
- G. K. Chesterton — his allegorical works The Napoleon of Notting Hill (1904) and The Man Who Was Thursday (1908) both feature surreal depictions of London
- Joseph Conrad — The Secret Agent (1907)
- J. M. Barrie — Peter and Wendy (1904–1911)
- Marie Belloc Lowndes — The Lodger (1913)
- D. H. Lawrence — Sons and Lovers (1913)
- P. G. Wodehouse — in his Jeeves and Wooster novels (1919 onwards), Wooster lives mainly in London, and is a member of the Drones Club
- T. S. Eliot — his long poem The Waste Land (1922) makes frequent reference to the Unreal City
- Virginia Woolf — Mrs Dalloway (1925)
- Evelyn Waugh — Vile Bodies (1930)
- Aldous Huxley — Brave New World (1932)
- P. L. Travers — Mary Poppins (1934) Takes place on Cherry Tree Lane and at the Bank of England
- Patrick Hamilton — 20,000 Streets Under the Sky (1935)
- George Orwell — Keep the Aspidistra Flying (1936), Nineteen Eighty-Four (1949)
- Cameron McCabe — The Face on the Cutting-Room Floor (1937)
- T. H. White — The Sword in the Stone (1938)
- Patrick Hamilton — Hangover Square (1941)
- Patrick White — The Living and the Dead (1941)
- Norman Collins — London Belongs to Me (1945)
- Elizabeth Bowen — The Heat of the Day (1949)
- Agatha Christie — Crooked House (1949)
- John Wyndham — The Day of the Triffids (1951)
- Graham Greene — The End of the Affair (1951), The Destructors (1954)
- Dodie Smith — The Hundred and One Dalmatians (1956)
- Michael Bond — A Bear Called Paddington (1958)
- Colin MacInnes — Absolute Beginners (1959), Mr Love and Justice (1960)
- Iris Murdoch — A Severed Head (1961)
- Muriel Spark — The Girls of Slender Means (1963)
- Doris Lessing — The Four-Gated City (1969)
- Michael Moorcock — the Jerry Cornelius stories (from 1969): Mother London (1988), King of the City (2000)
- Thomas Pynchon — Gravity's Rainbow (1973)
- Maureen Duffy — Capital: a Fiction (1975)
- Julian Barnes — Metroland (1980)
- Peter Ackroyd — The Great Fire of London (1982), Hawksmoor (1985), English Music (1992), The House of Doctor Dee (1993), Dan Leno and the Limehouse Golem (1994)
- Alan Moore — V for Vendetta (1982 – 1989), From Hell (1989–1996)
- Martin Amis — Money (1984), London Fields (1989)
- Iain Banks — Walking on Glass (1985)
- Tom Clancy — Patriot Games (1987)
- Hanif Kureishi — The Buddha of Suburbia (1987)
- Vertigo (DC Comics) — Hellblazer (1988–2013)
- Salman Rushdie — The Satanic Verses (1989)
- Josephine Hart — Damage (1991)
- Bernice Rubens — A Solitary Grief (1991)
- Barbara Vine — King Solomon's Carpet (1991)
- Nick Hornby — Fever Pitch - A Fan's Life (1992), High Fidelity (1995), About a Boy (1998)
- Will Self — Grey Area (1994)
- Helen Fielding — Bridget Jones's Diary (1996)
- Neil Gaiman — Neverwhere (1996) is set partly in real London, and partly in an alternative 'London Below'
- Anthony Frewin — London Blues (1997), is set mainly in Soho at the time of the Profumo affair
- Ian McEwan — Enduring Love (1997)
- J. K. Rowling — Harry Potter series (1997–2007) features fictional London locations: the hidden Diagon Alley, and Platform 9 3/4 at King's Cross
- Kouta Hirano — Hellsing manga series (1997–2009) casts London as the story's main setting
- William Boyd — Armadillo (1998)

== 21st century fiction ==
- Hanif Kureishi — Gabriel's Gift (2001)
- John Lanchester — Mr Phillips (2001), Capital (2012)
- Bernard Cornwell — Gallows Thief (2001)
- Philip Reeve — Mortal Engines (2001), A Darkling Plain (2006), Fever Crumb (2009)
- Zadie Smith — White Teeth (2000), NW (2012)
- Miles Tredinnick — Topless, (2001)
- Iain Banks — Dead Air (2002)
- William Gibson — Pattern Recognition (2003)
- Zoë Heller — Notes on a Scandal (2003)
- Adam Thirlwell — Politics (2003)
- Neal Stephenson — The Baroque Cycle (Quicksilver (2003), The Confusion (2004), The System of the World (2004))
- Monica Ali — Brick Lane (2004)
- Ben Elton — Past Mortem (2004)
- A. N. Wilson — My Name Is Legion (2004)
- Nick Hornby — A Long Way Down (2005)
- Ian McEwan — Saturday (2005)
- Will Self — The Book of Dave (2006)
- Charles Finch — A Beautiful Blue Death (2007), The September Society (2008), The Fleet Street Murders (2009), A Stranger in Mayfair (2010)
- Mary Novik — Conceit (2007)
- Charlie Fletcher — The Stoneheart (2008)
- Anthony Horowitz — Stormbreaker, Eagle Strike, Scorpia, Ark Angel (2008)
- Ruth Rendell — Portobello (2008)
- Audrey Niffenegger — Her Fearful Symmetry (2009)
- DC Comics — Wonder Woman is based in London following The New 52 relaunch of her ongoing series (2011–present)
- Jared Anthony Patterson — My Journey through the Gay Underground of London: Memoir of a Tottenham Boy (2011)
- Ben Aaronovitch — Rivers of London (2011), Moon Over Soho (2011), Whispers Under Ground (2012), Broken Homes (2013) The Hanging Tree (2016) The Furthest Station (2017)
- Mike Bartlett — 13 (2011)
- Daniel O'Malley — The Rook (2012)
- Robert Galbraith — The Cuckoo's Calling (2013), The Silkworm (2014) Career of Evil (2015) Lethal White (TBC)
- Anakana Schofield — Martin John (2016)
- Robert J. Sherman — Bumblescratch (2016)
- John Roman Baker — Time of Obsessions (2017)
- Cassandra Clare — The Clockwork Angel (2010), The Clockwork Prince (2011), The Clockwork Princess (2013)
- Jonathan Stroud⁣ — ⁣The Screaming Staircase (2013), The Whispering Skull (2014), The Hollow Boy (2015), The Creeping Shadow (2016), The Empty Grave (2017)
- Deborah Hewitt — The Nightjar (2019)
- Garth Nix — The Left-Handed Booksellers of London (2020)

== Nursery rhymes ==
Several nursery rhymes mention places in London.

- London Bridge is mentioned in London Bridge is falling down.
- Oranges and Lemons mentions several London Churches.
- Pop Goes the Weasel one version refers to the Eagle pub on the City Road.
