= Trinity College, Oxford =

College of the University of Oxford

Trinity College
- University of Oxford
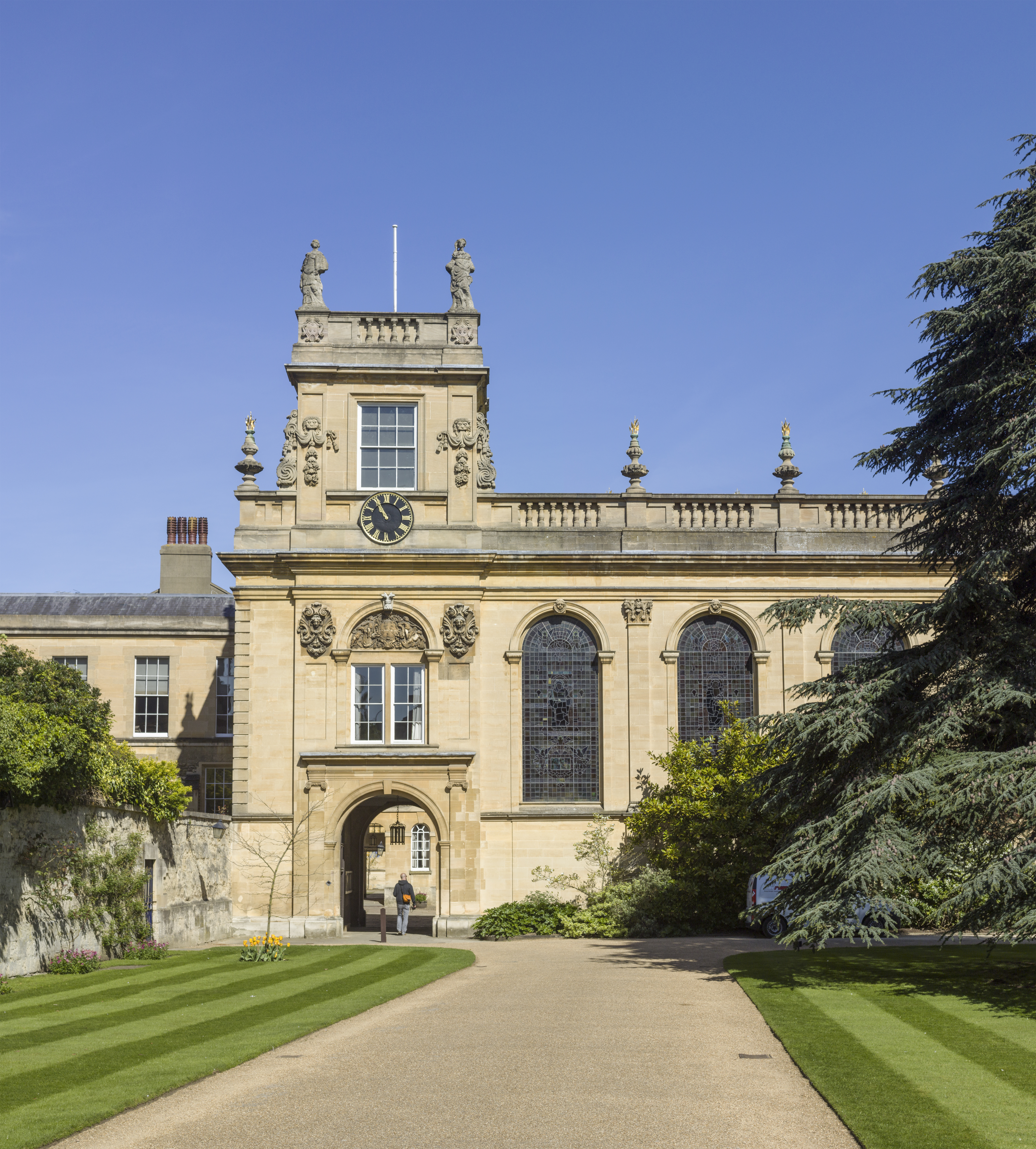

- Arms: Per pale or and azure, on a chevron between three griffins' heads erased four fleurs-de-lis all counter-changed (arms of Sir Thomas Pope, Founder)
- Location: Broad Street, Oxford OX1 3BH
- Coordinates: 51.755343°N 1.256958°W
- Full name: The College of the Holy and Undivided Trinity in the University of Oxford, of the foundation of Sir Thomas Pope (Knight)
- Latin name: Collegium Sanctae et Individuae Trinitatis in Universitate Oxon. ex Fundatione Thomae Pope Militis
- Motto: Latin: Quod tacitum velis nemini dixeris (That which you wish to be secret, tell to nobody)
- Established: 1555; 471 years ago
- Named for: The Holy Trinity
- Sister college: Churchill College, Cambridge
- President: Sir Robert Chote
- Undergraduates: 317 (2024/2025)
- Postgraduates: 138 (2024/2025)
- Endowment: £191 million (2023)
- Website: www.trinity.ox.ac.uk
- JCR: https://www.trinityjcr.com
- MCR: http://www.trinitymcr.com
- Boat club: Boat Club

Map
- Location within Oxford city centre

Trinity College (full name: The College of the Holy and Undivided Trinity in the University of Oxford, of the foundation of Sir Thomas Pope (Knight)) is a constituent college of the University of Oxford in England. The college was founded in 1555 by Sir Thomas Pope, on land previously occupied by Durham College, home to Benedictine monks from Durham Cathedral.

Despite its large physical size, the college is relatively small in terms of student numbers at approximately 400. It was founded as a men's college and has been coeducational since 1979. As of 2023, the total funds of Trinity amounted to more than £224 million, including a financial endowment of £191 million.

Trinity has produced three British prime ministers, placing it third after Christ Church and Balliol in terms of former students who have held that office.

== History ==
=== Durham College ===
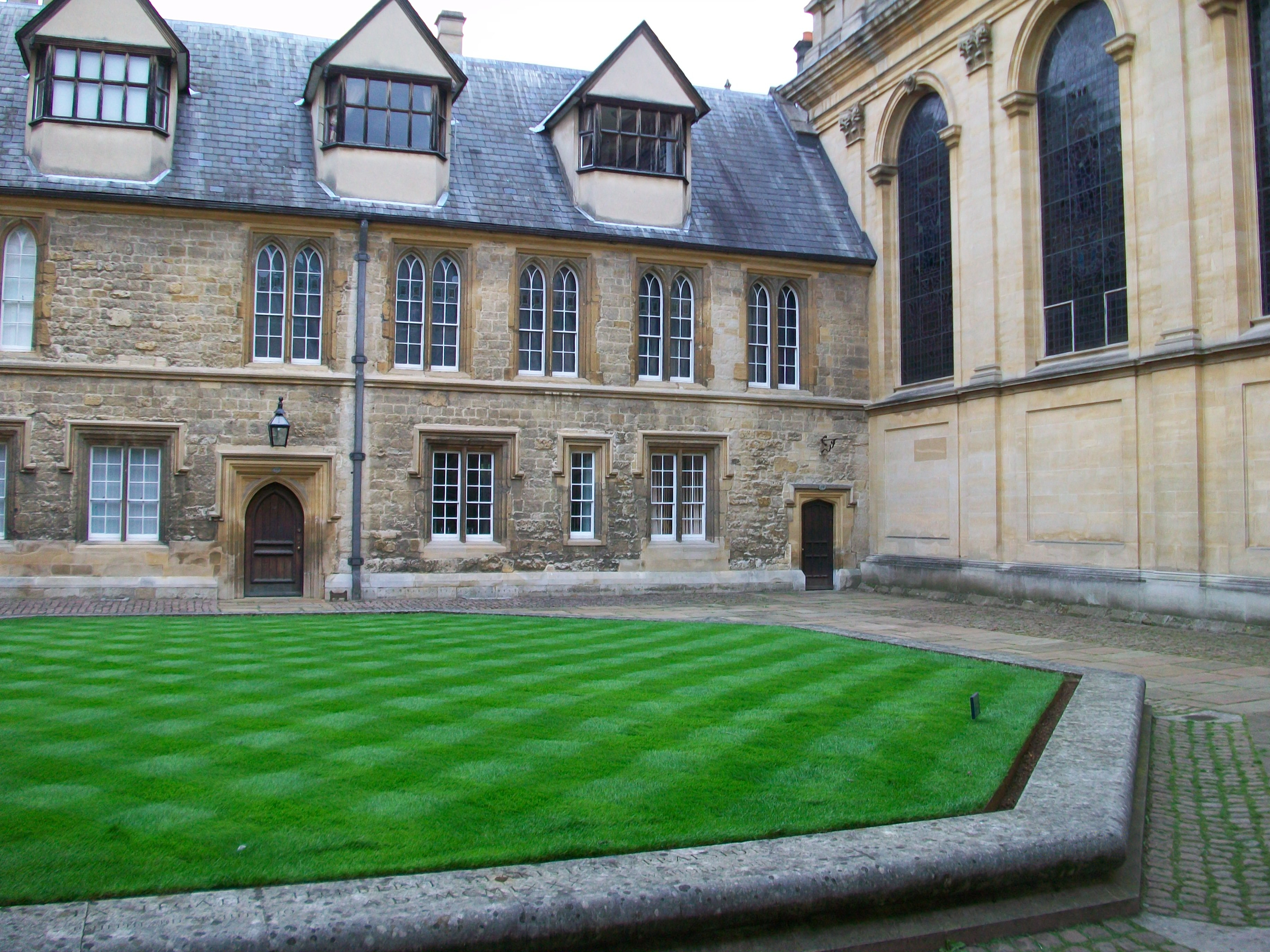
Surviving buildings of Durham College in Durham Quadrangle

The site where Trinity College now stands was originally occupied by Durham College, built for Benedictine monks from Durham Cathedral. This college had been founded after land was bought in 1291, though monks had been sent to Oxford for a few years previous to this. The site was surrendered to the crown in March 1545, being granted to private owners in 1553. They were then acquired by civil servant Thomas Pope on 20 February 1555 (February 1554 as then was), who used them to found Trinity College 16 days later. Durham College was originally dedicated to the Virgin Mary, St Cuthbert, and the Trinity, and it is thought that Trinity College took its name from the last element of this dedication.

=== Trinity College ===
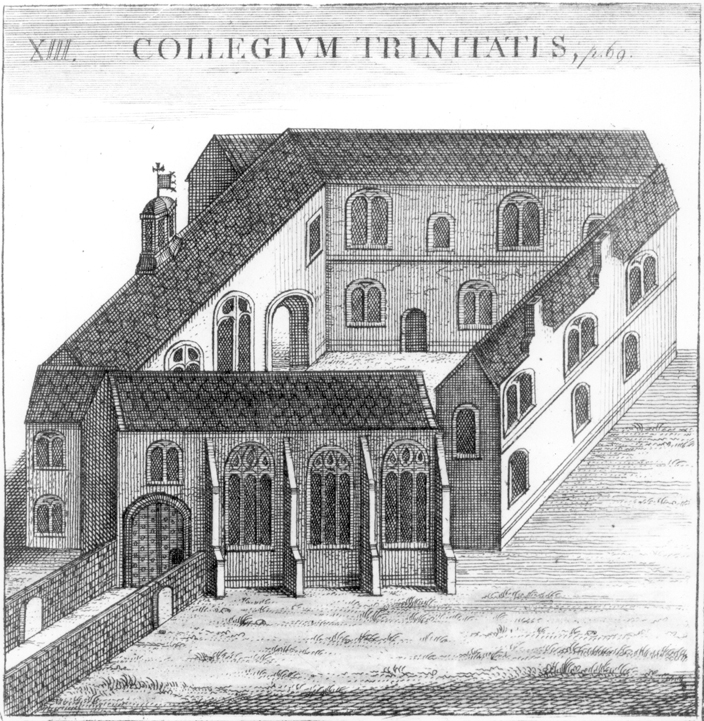
Trinity College in 1566 (looking north), shortly after its foundation. This quadrangle is now Durham Quad

Trinity College was founded in 1555 by Sir Thomas Pope, on land bought following the abolition of Durham College during the period of Protestant Reformation, whose buildings housed the original foundation. Pope was a Catholic who had no surviving children, and he hoped that by founding a college he would be remembered in the prayers of its students. His remains are still encased beside the chapel altar. The original foundation provided for a president, 12 fellows, and 12 scholars, and for up to 20 undergraduates. The fellows were required to take Holy Orders and to remain unmarried.

The college remained an all-male institution until 1979, when (in common with a number of other Oxford colleges) it admitted its first women undergraduates. It is now fully co-educational and co-residential. Between 2015 and 2017, 41.1% of UK undergraduates admitted to Trinity came from state schools.

Trinity was one of the locations used for filming of the 1981 TV serial Brideshead Revisited; its grounds were also, in part, the basis for Fleet College in Charles Finch's The Last Enchantments. Trinity has also featured heavily in episodes of Inspector Morse, Lewis and Endeavour.

Dame Hilary Boulding, formerly principal of the Royal Welsh College of Music and Drama, succeeded Sir Ivor Roberts as president in August 2017.

=== Trinity–Balliol rivalry ===
For many years, there has been a traditional and fierce rivalry shown between the students of Trinity and those of its immediate neighbour to the west, Balliol College. It has manifested itself on the sports field and the river; in the form of songs (of greater or less offensiveness) sung over the dividing walls; and in the form of "raids" on the other college.

In college folklore, the rivalry goes back to the late 17th century, when Ralph Bathurst, president of Trinity, was supposedly observed throwing stones at Balliol's windows. In fact, although the first antagonism was recorded in 1583, the rivalry in its modern form appears to date from the late 1890s, when the chant or song known as a "Gordouli" began to be sung from the Balliol side. The traditional words run:

Gordouli
Face like a ham,
Bobby Johnson says so
And he should know.

Although these words are now rarely heard, the singing of songs over the wall is still known as "a Gordouli". The traditional Gordouli is said to have been sung by Balliol and Trinity men in the trenches of Mesopotamia during the First World War.

The rivalry was given an extra edge in the early 20th century by the contrast between the radical tendencies of many Balliol students and Trinity's traditional conservatism and social exclusivity. The president of Trinity between 1907 and 1938 was Herbert Blakiston, who became notorious for his reluctance to admit non-white students. Notably, he stubbornly resisted pressure from the India Office to admit undergraduates from British India, something that government department was attempting to promote. Balliol in contrast did admit a number of Indian and Asiatic students which gave many of the taunts from the Trinity side a distinctly racist tone: Balliol students, for example, were sometime referred to as "Basutos".

In Five Red Herrings (1931), a Lord Peter Wimsey novel by Dorothy L. Sayers, Lord Peter (a Balliol man) is asked whether he remembers a certain contemporary from Trinity. "'I never knew any Trinity men,' said Wimsey. 'The Jews have no dealings with the Samaritans.'" Sayers also alludes to the rivalry in Murder Must Advertise (1933): Mr Ingleby, a Trinity man, comments, "If there is one thing more repulsive than another it is Balliolity."

One of the wittier raids from Balliol, in 1962 or 1963, involved the turfing of the whole of Trinity JCR (complete with daffodils). One of the most famous incidents was perpetrated by three Trinity students (Richard Todd, Richard Cohen and Deidrie Small) on the new intake of freshers to Balliol in October 1985. They sent personally addressed letters to each of Balliol's new freshers on Balliol headed notepaper. It enclosed a narrow neck 100ml screw-top receptacle. The attached letter read, "Dear [X], Welcome to Balliol. As you are aware the university requires a short medical check-up as part of your Coming-Up. Could you therefore please provide a urine sample in the attached sample bottle and return it to your college tutor's office by no later than 5.00 PM on Wednesday." The letters were sent out on that Wednesday evening. Balliol admitted to some 57 being returned. The incident was subsequently reported in the Daily Express under the headline, "students play wee joke on neighbours". The incident concluded with Todd and Cohen unfurling a banner over Balliol reading, "We are Balliol. Please Don't Take The Piss!". The last incident suspected to relate to the feud was the vandalism of Trinity's SCR pond in 2010, which led to the death of all but one of the fish.

== Buildings ==
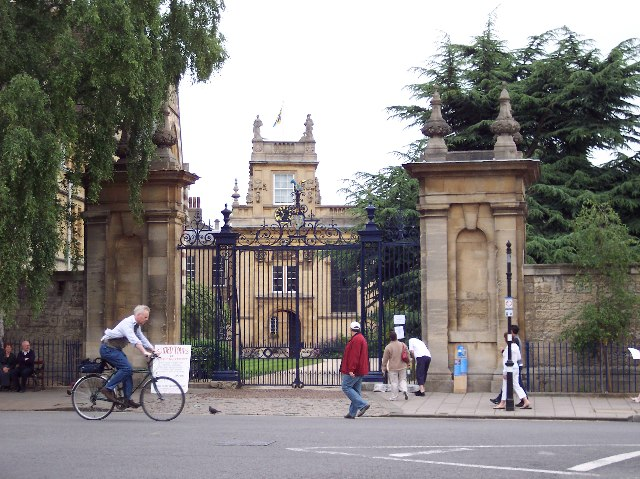
Entrance from Broad Street

The main entrance to the college is on Broad Street, located between Balliol College and Blackwell's bookshop, and opposite Turl Street. It is enclosed by an iron palisade rather than a wall, and the college's distinctive blue gates provide it with a more open appearance than many others in Oxford. The rear of the college backs onto St John's College, and has entrances on both St Giles' and Parks Road. As well as its four major quadrangles, the college also boasts a large lawn and gardens, which include a small area of woodland.

=== Durham Quadrangle ===
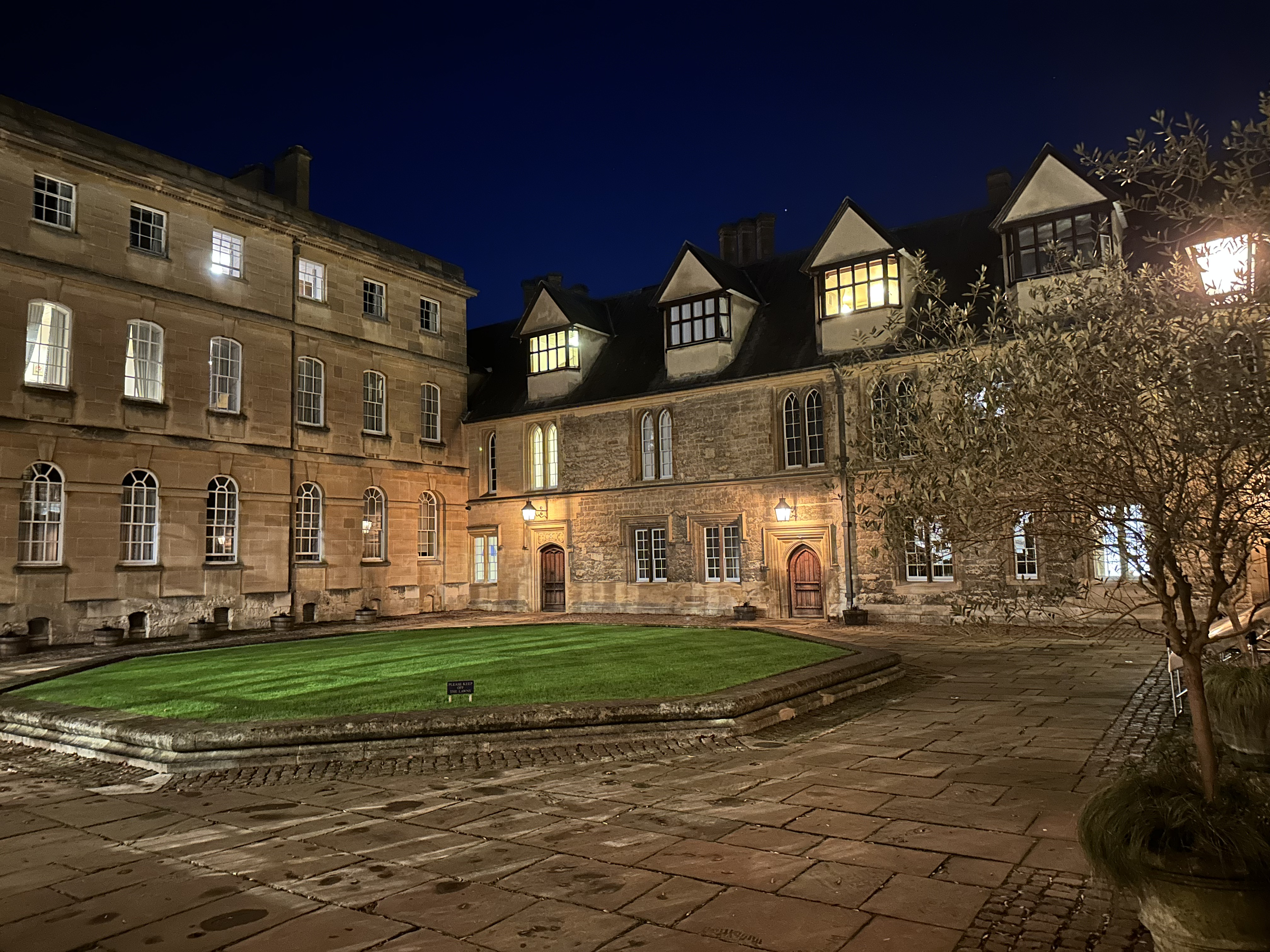
Durham Quadrangle at night, including surviving buildings of Durham College (right)

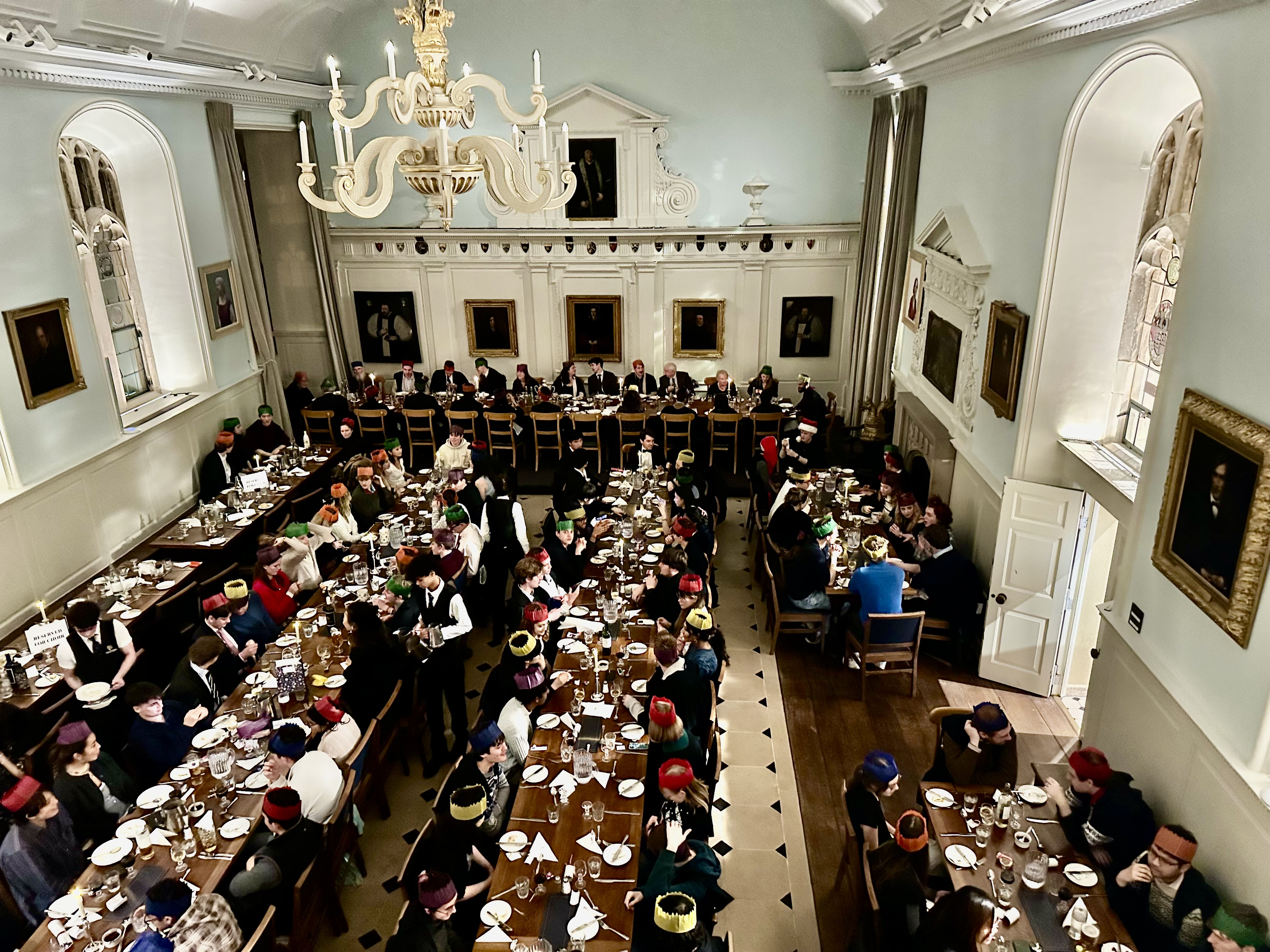
Dining hall following 2024 refurbishment

Durham Quadrangle is the oldest part of the college, and was originally the quadrangle of the medieval Durham College, Oxford, whose land and buildings were purchased by Thomas Pope in 1555 to house his new foundation. The East range of the Durham College buildings survives, including the Old Library on the first floor, along with some medieval remnants in the West range.

=== Chapel ===
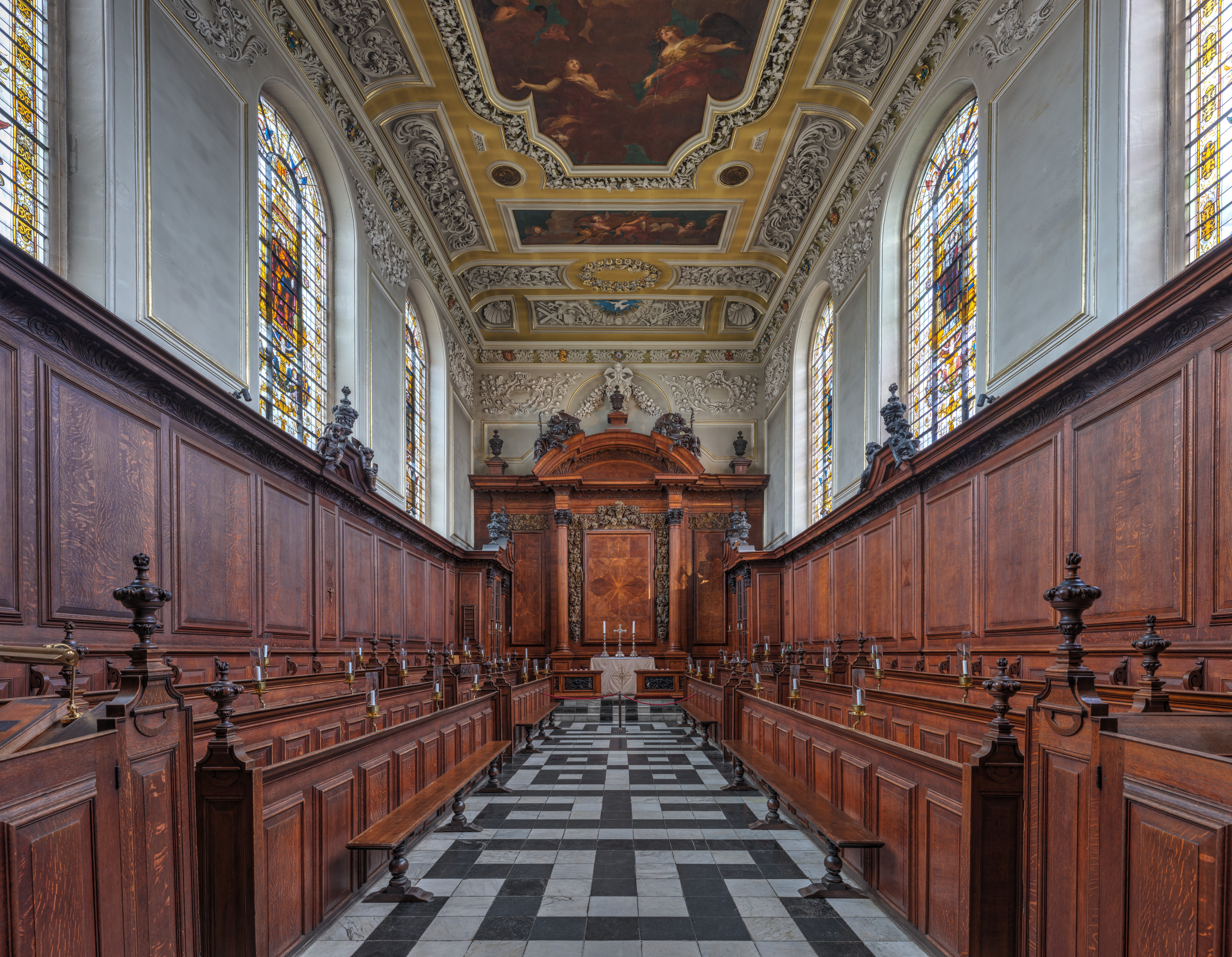
The chapel

The chapel, relatively modest in size compared to some of its Oxford counterparts, was the first college chapel to be designed entirely in the Baroque style. It was thought to have been designed by Henry Aldrich, with advice from Christopher Wren, and was consecrated in 1694. The executed design was based on a second print, moderated by Wren, and the previous print, held in the Library of Christ Church, Oxford, showed a different scheme for the west tower and the interior.

On the top of the west tower sit four female statues, which represent Astronomy, Geometry, Medicine and Theology.

=== Garden Quadrangle ===
In a letter dated 22 June 1665, kept in the Trinity College Archives, Christopher Wren wrote back to the President of the College, Ralph Bathurst that it would be 'lame one... like a threelegged table' in response to Bathurst's suggestion that an open Quadrangle be put up to allow the view of the Fellows' Garden.

During Wren's absence in Paris, the construction of the initial freestanding building - two-storied accommodation block with a mansard roof (the first one in Oxford) was put up under the direction of Oxfordshire stonemason family, the Townsends between 1665 and 1668. The west side was added to the same plan in 1682. The mansard roof was pulled down and replaced with the addition of a third storey as the population of Trinity College students grew.

In its current state, the Garden Quad remains faithful to Bathurst's original intentions; the addition of the central block, completing the open-air quadrangle, was probably inspired by William Byrd's Garden Quadrangle at New College, Oxford, completed between 1682 and 1702.

=== Front Quadrangle ===
The front quadrangle between the Durham quadrangle and Broad Street was formed by the new buildings (1883–1885) and the president's lodgings (1885–1887), both designed by Thomas Graham Jackson. It also includes some older buildings on Broad Street: four old cottages and Kettell Hall, a stone house built by President Ralph Kettell in around 1620.

=== Library Quadrangle ===
The library quadrangle is located between Jackson's new buildings and the new library of 1925–1928, built as a memorial to members of the college who perished in the First World War. The building was designed by architect Mr. J. Osborne Smith, with the ornate barrel roof created by the leading architectural designer Leonard Shuffrey.

The Cumberbatch buildings to the north and south were designed by Maguire and Murray and built in 1964–1966. The 10,000 square feet (930 m^{2}) Norrington Room (named after Sir Arthur Norrington, a former president of the college) of Blackwells bookshop lies underneath the quad.

In 2018 the college gained planning permission for a new building, designed by ADAM Architecture, to the north of the library quadrangle and the university's Weston Library and replacing the northern Cumberbatch building. The Levine Building was opened in 2022 and marked the beginning of the overarching transformation of Trinity College.

== Graces ==
The college grace reads:

Latin	English
Miserere nostri, te quaesumus Domine, tuisque donis, quae de tua benignitate percepturi sumus, benedicito, per Iesum Christum Dominum nostrum, amen.	"Have mercy upon us, we beseech thee O Lord, and bless thy gifts of which we are about to partake from thy goodness, through Jesus Christ our Lord. Amen."

== Student life ==
The college offers accommodation to all undergraduate students. First and second years are housed on the college's main site, and third and fourth years in college buildings on the Woodstock Road.

=== Chapel Choir ===
The Chapel Choir of Trinity College consists of up to eight choral scholars and exhibitioners, and over thirty choral volunteers from across Oxford. It remains as one of the few non-auditioning chapel choirs in Oxford and the majority of its singers are Trinity College students.

The choir sing a weekly Evensong on a Sunday with occasional weekday services to mark college events such the Founder's Day. Unlike many colleges, Trinity College remains in the minority of Oxford colleges with no Director of Music. Thus, the responsibility of overseeing the chapel choir falls to the organ scholars and is overseen by the Chaplain. As of 2023, the organ scholars and choral award-holders are supported by Sarah Tenant-Flowers and Joanna Campion-Watt. Previous choral advisors to the Chapel Choir include Ralph Allwood who was appointed after his directorship at Eton College.

The Chapel Choir has gone on overseas tours annually: tour destinations include Dublin in 2008, where they sang concerts and a Sung Eucharist in St Patrick's Cathedral, Dublin, Rome in 2009, Paris in 2010, Barcelona in 2011 and Vienna in 2012. In more recent decade, the Chapel Choir has toured Valencia (2022), Ljubljana (2023) and Lyon (2024), singing concerts and mass at Ljubljana Cathedral and Basilica of Notre-Dame de Fourvière.

In 2009, the Choir released a CD, titled A Voice from Afar, directed by then–organ scholar Catherine Wallace.

== Notable alumni ==
In over four centuries of its history, Trinity has produced a number of notable students who have led careers in fields such as academia, politics, science, religions and the arts.

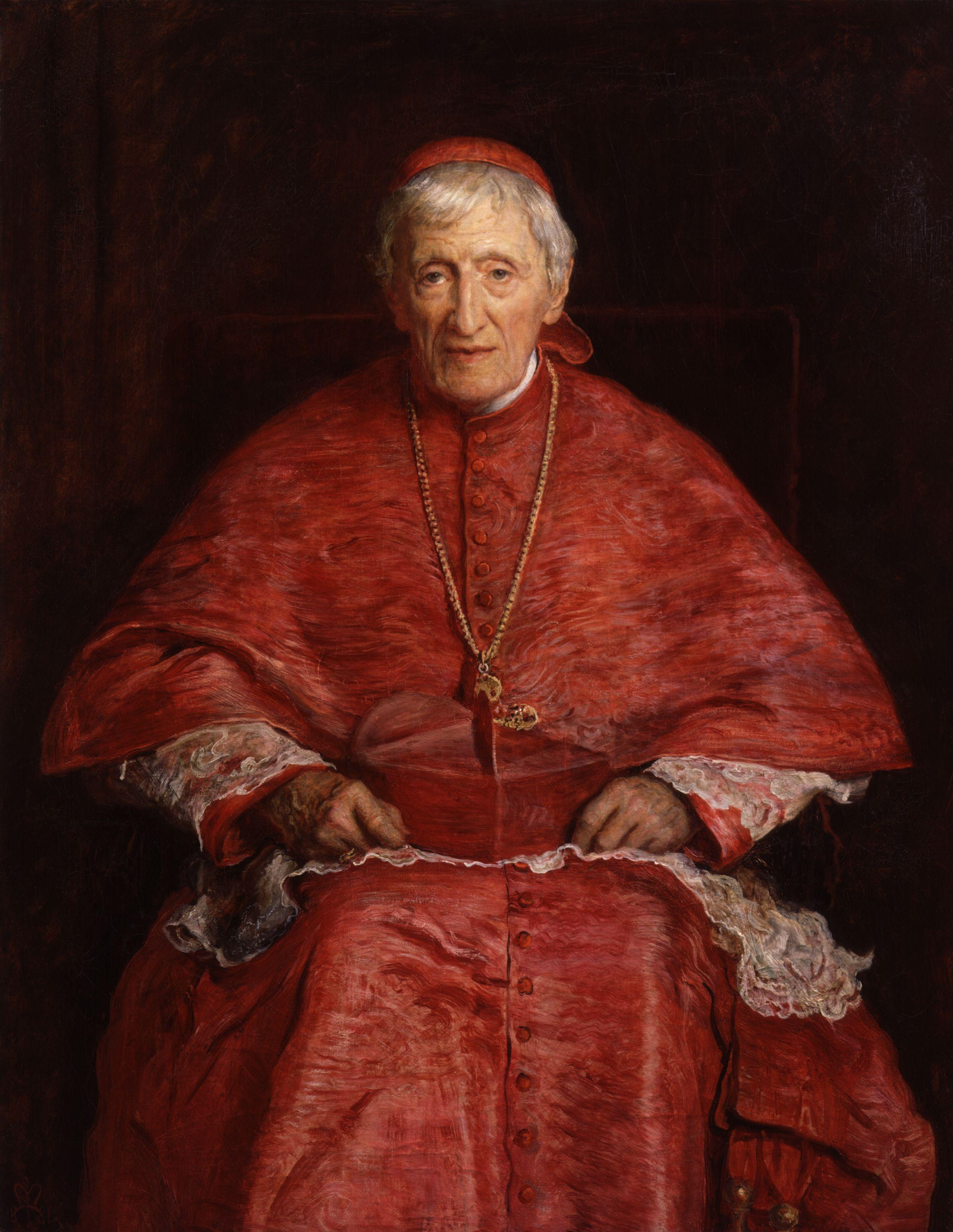
St John Henry Newman, theologian, poet and Cardinal of the Catholic Church

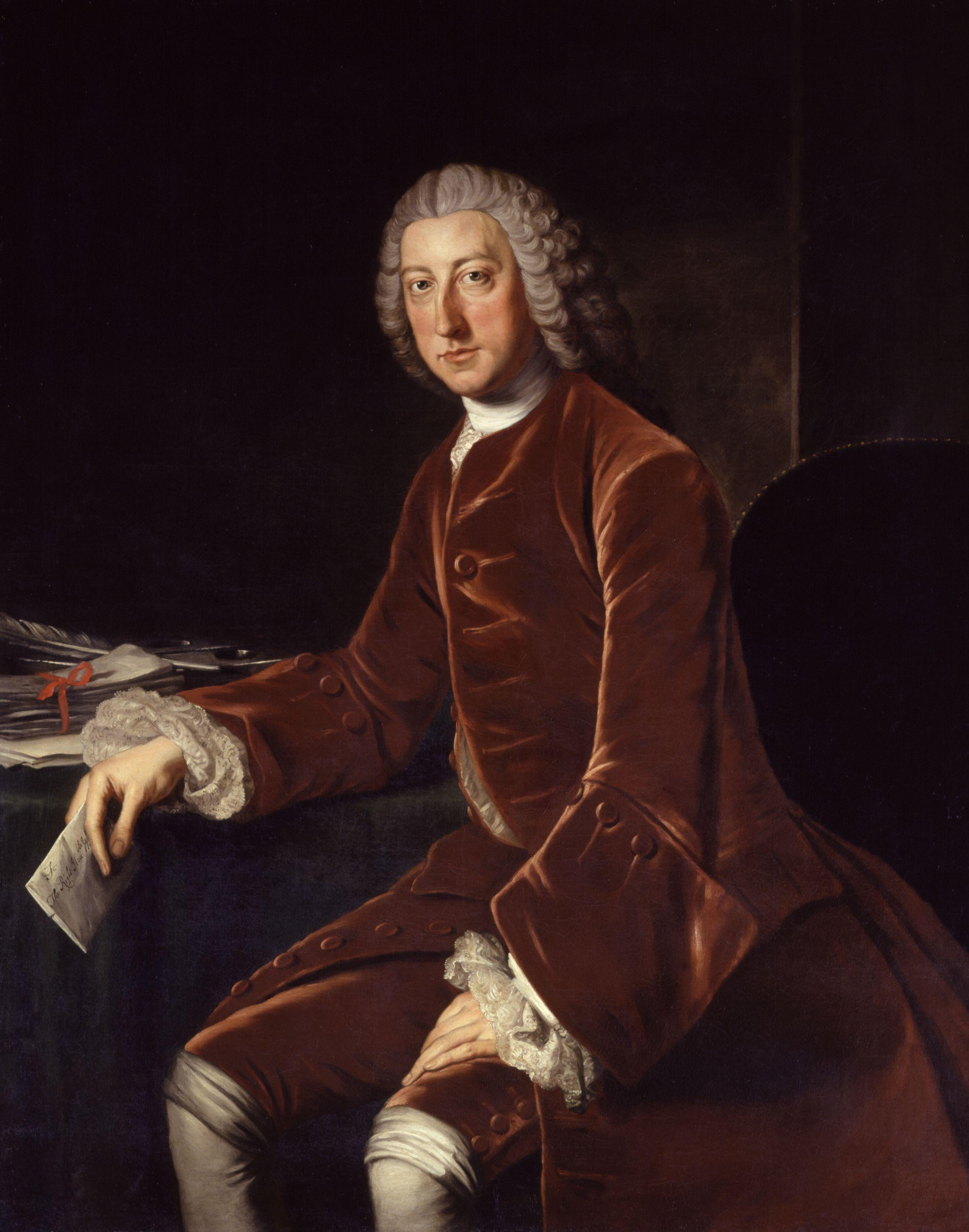
William Pitt the Elder, former Prime Minister of Great Britain

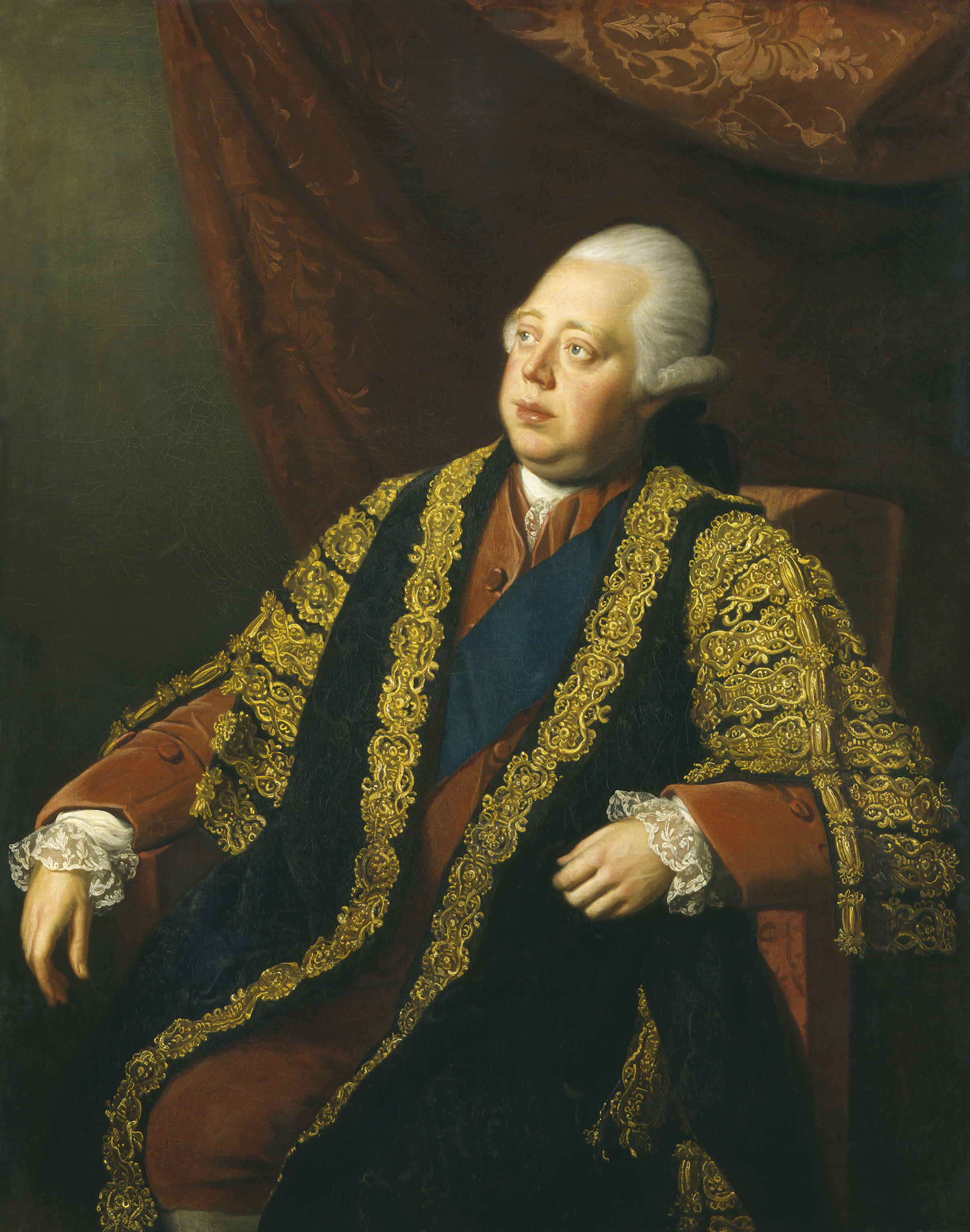
Frederick North, Lord North, former Prime Minister of Great Britain

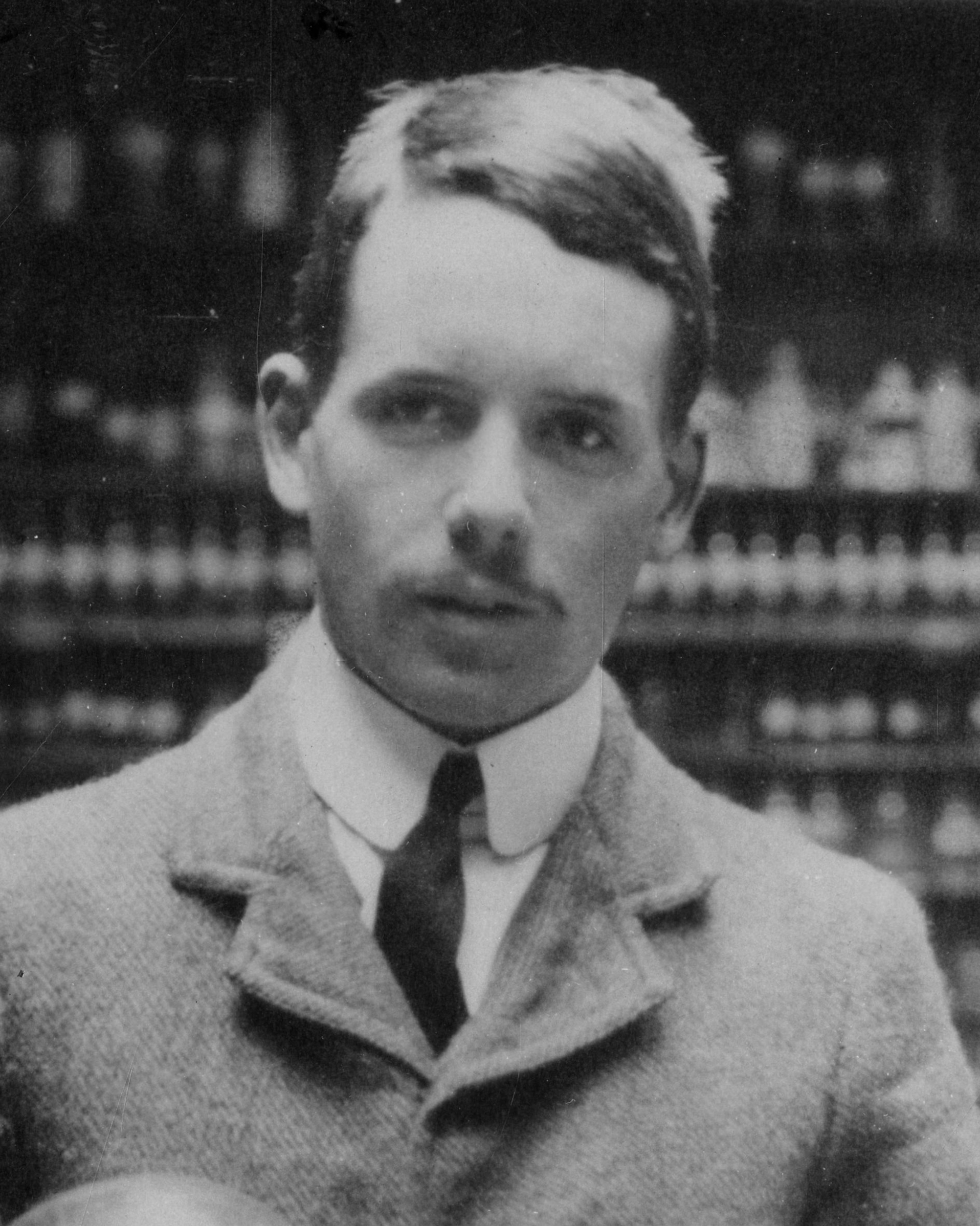
Henry Moseley, physicist and discoverer of Moseley's law

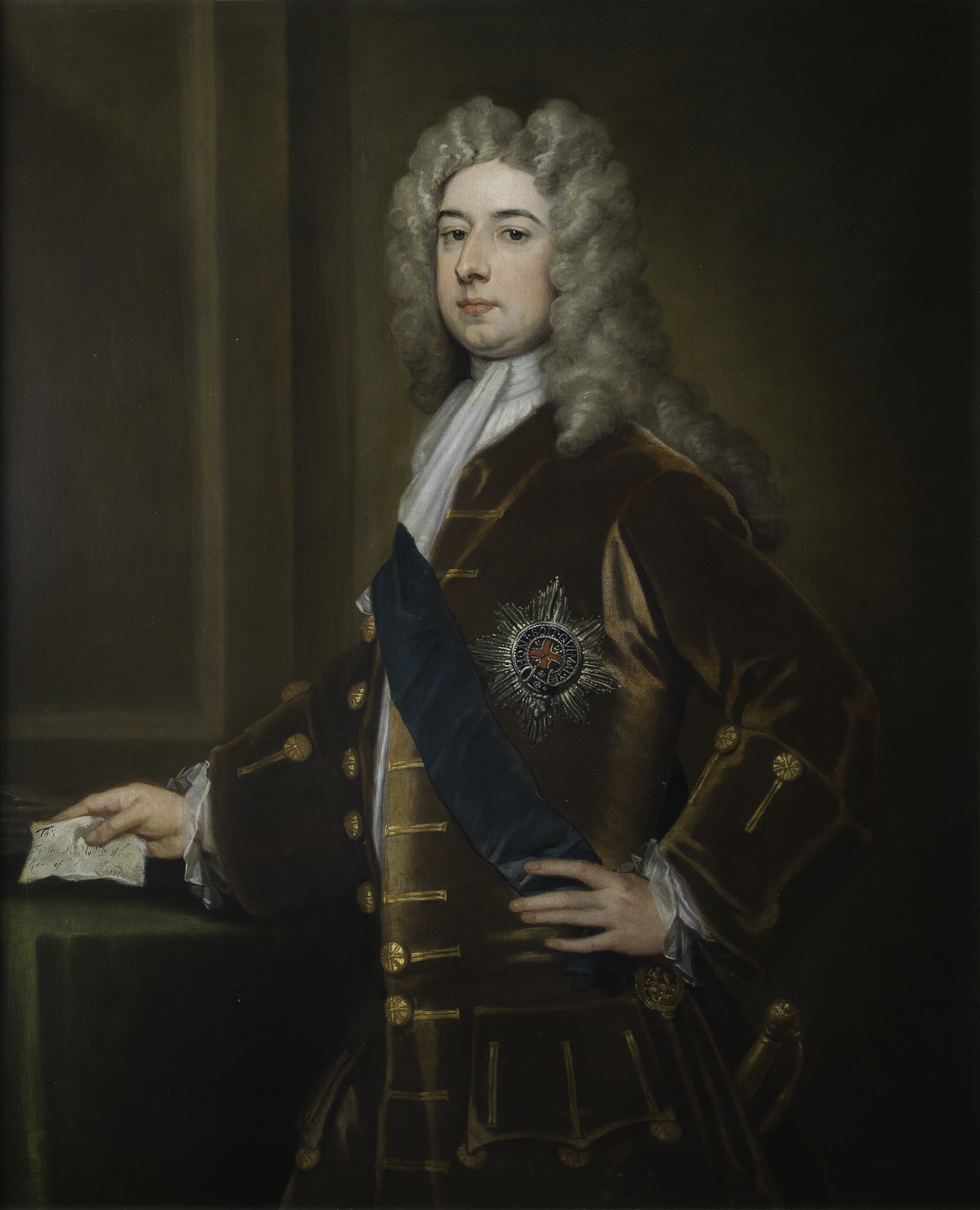
Spencer Compton, 1st Earl of Wilmington, former Prime Minister of Great Britain

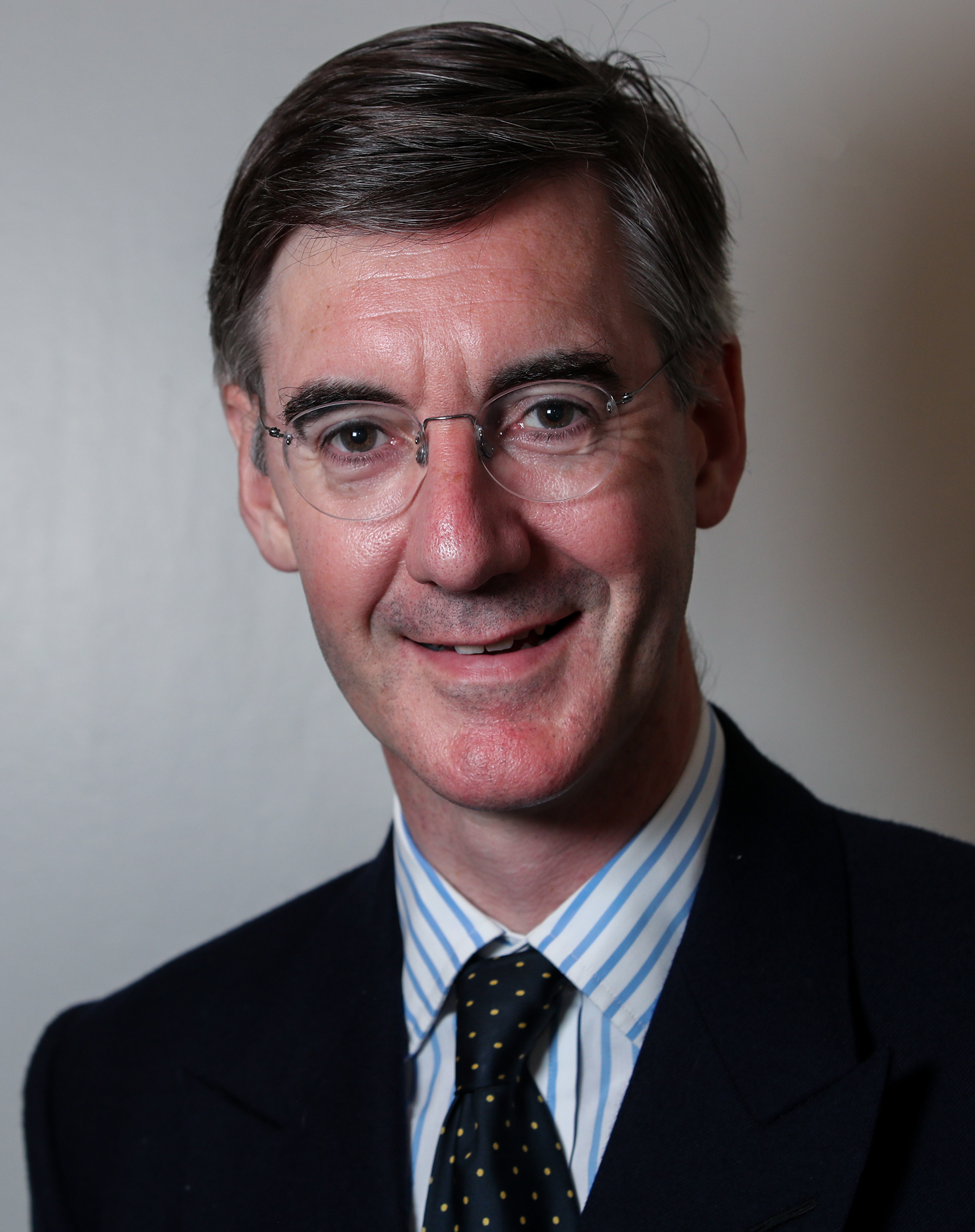
Sir Jacob Rees-Mogg, former Leader of the House of Commons and Lord President of the Council

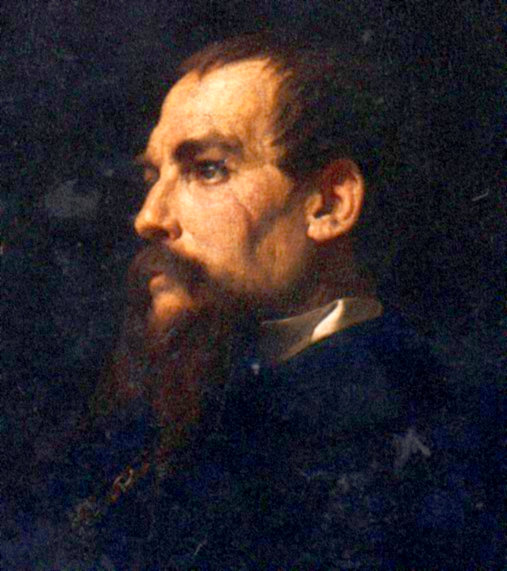
Sir Richard Burton, explorer and writer

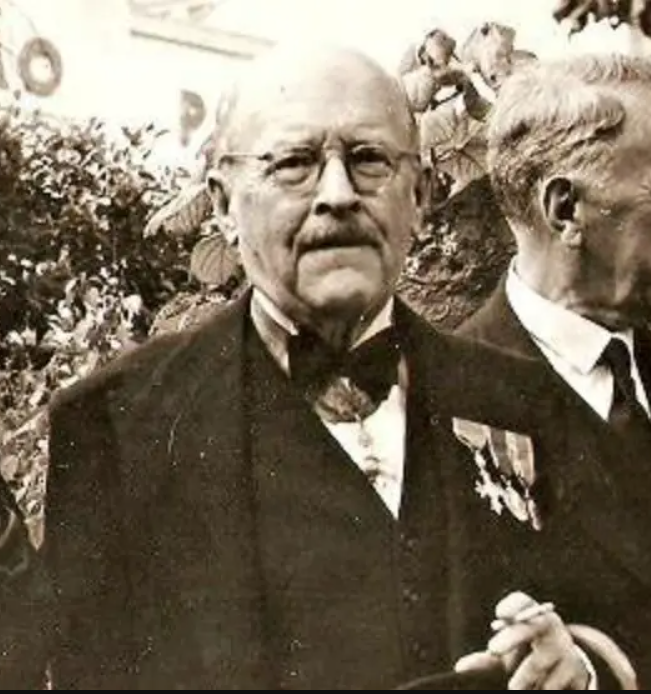
Robert Smallbones, British diplomat and humanitarian

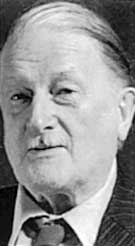
Sir Ronald Syme, Roman historian

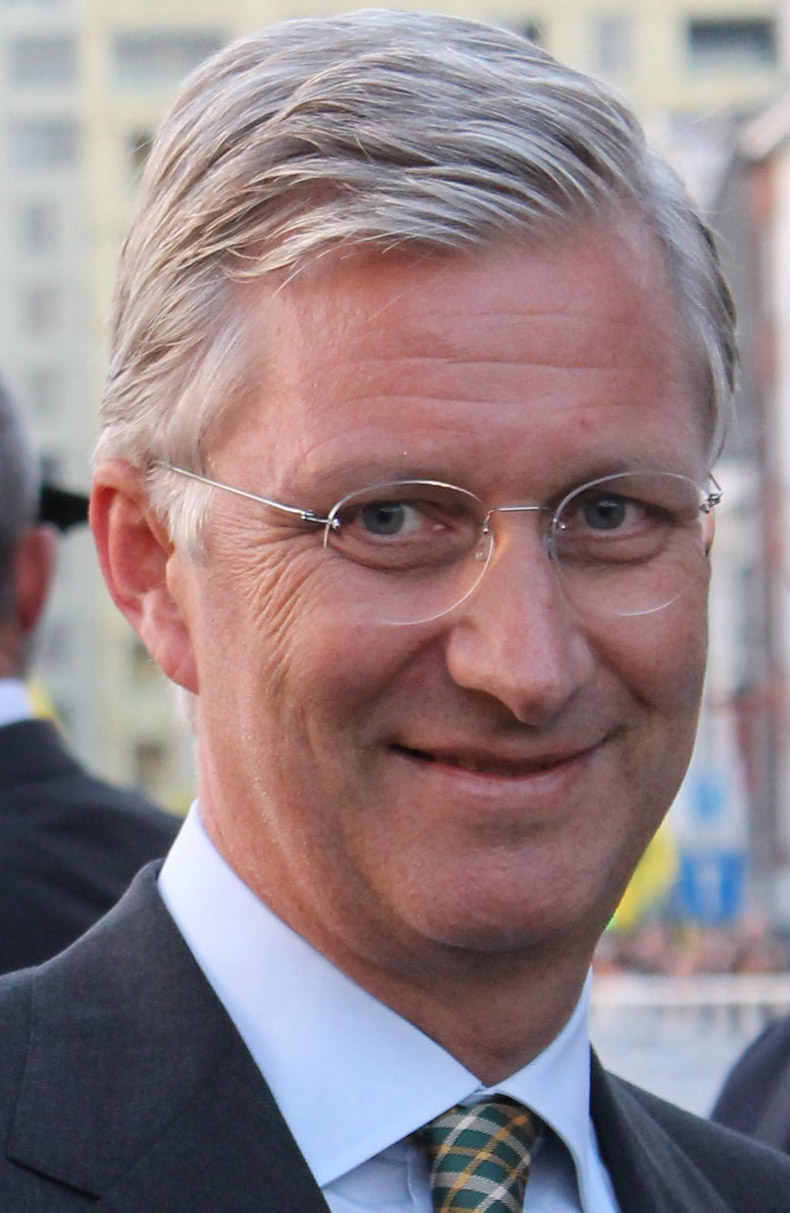
Philippe of Belgium, King of the Belgians

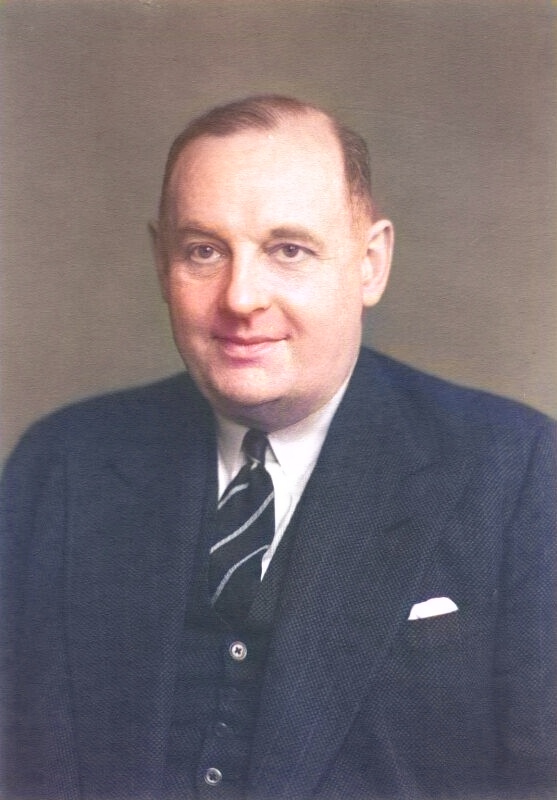
Sir Eric Errington, Bt. Conservative Party politician and Justice of the Peace

== Gallery ==
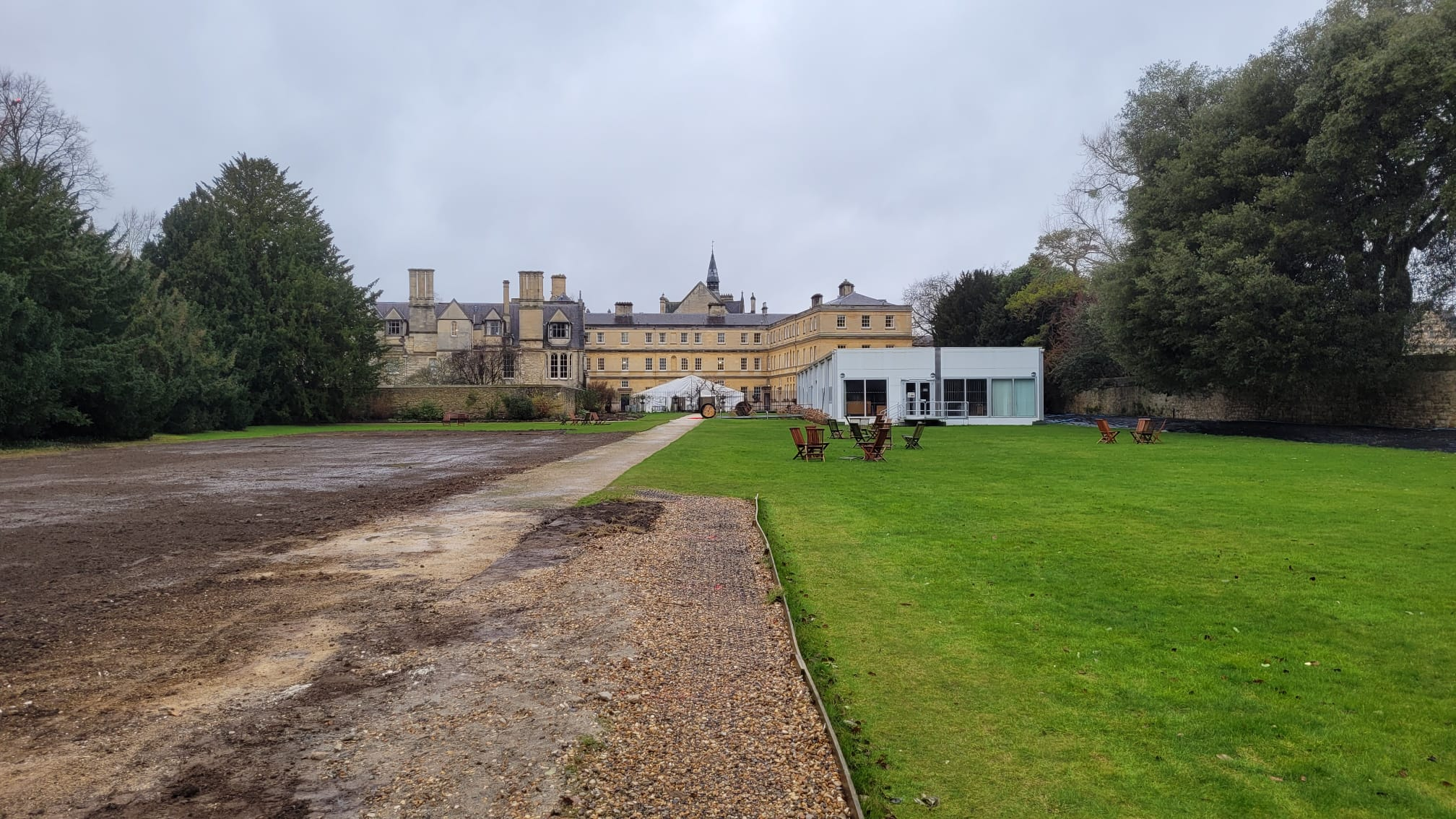
Back lawns looking towards Garden Quad; the white structure centre right is a temporary dining hall (2023).

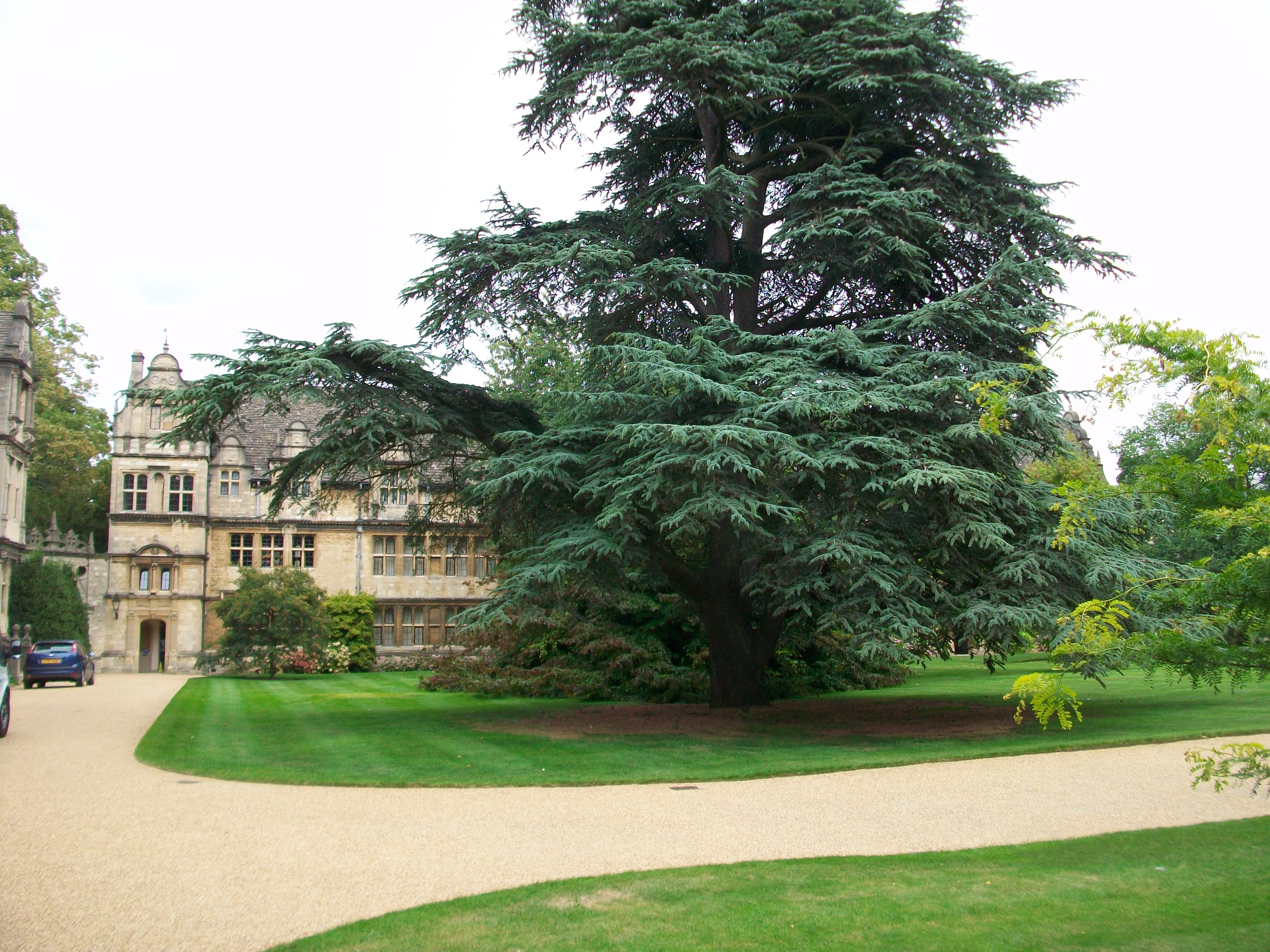
Front Quad looking towards Staircase VII

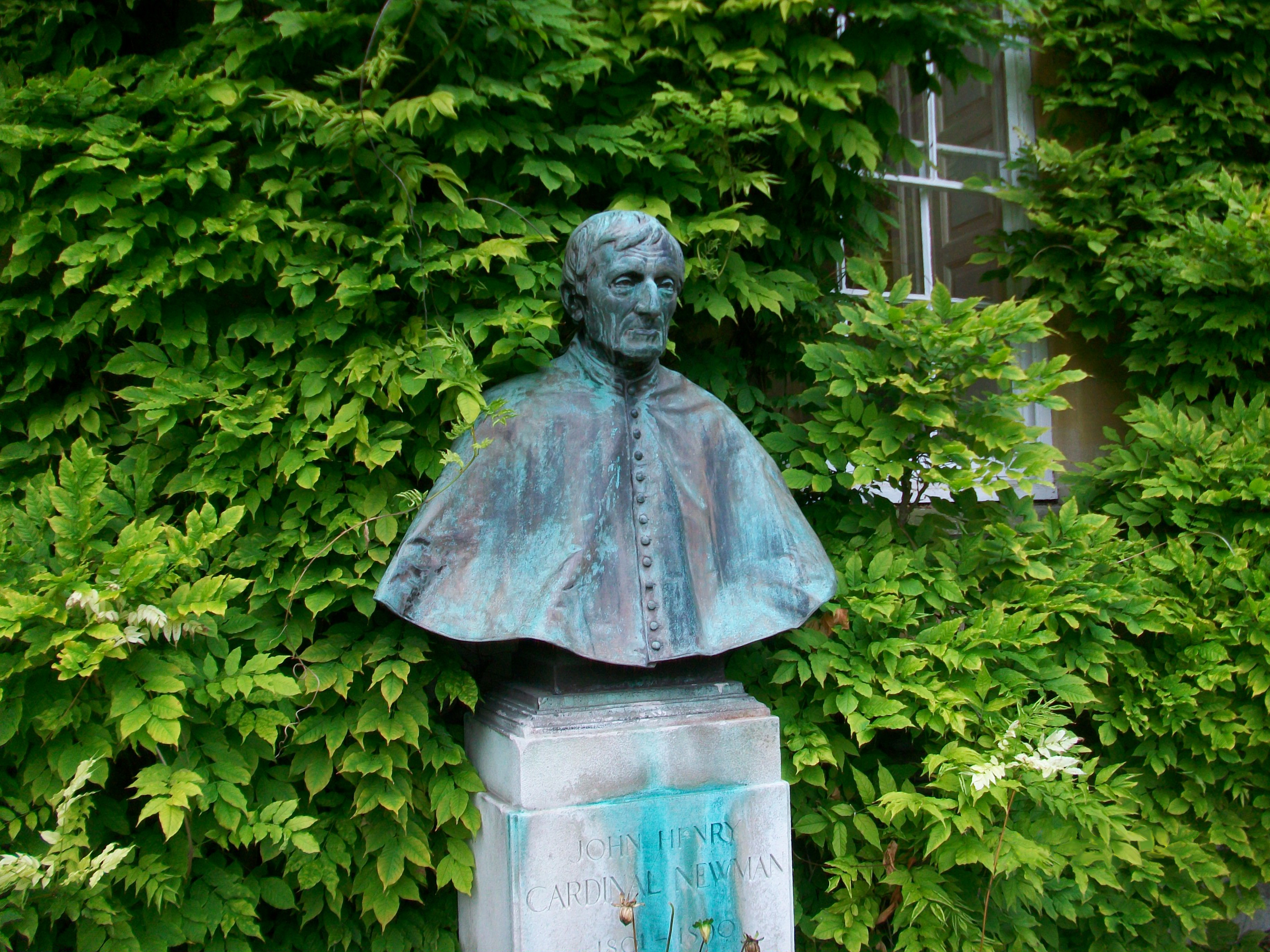
Bust of Cardinal Newman outside Garden Quad

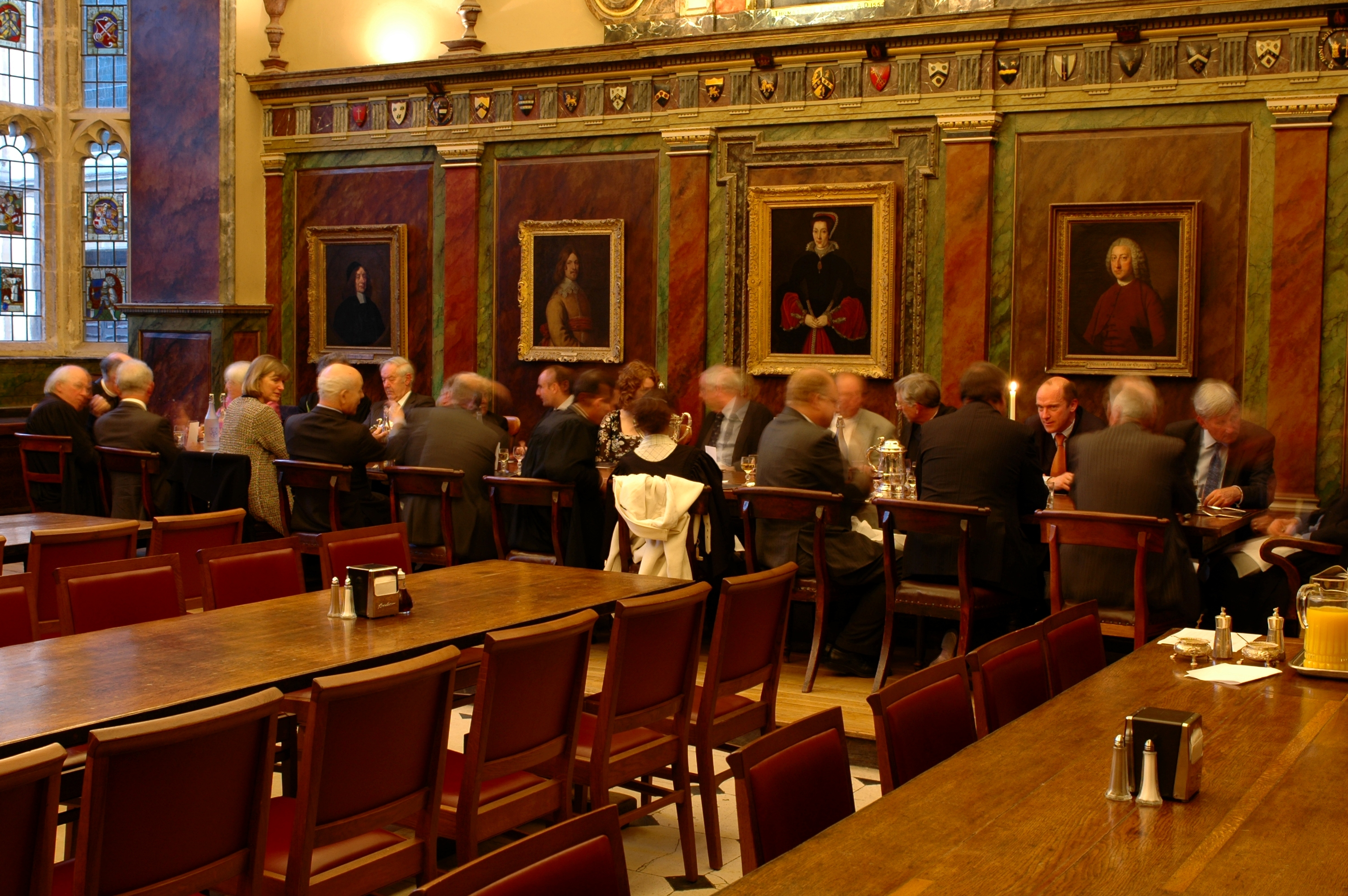
Old dining hall

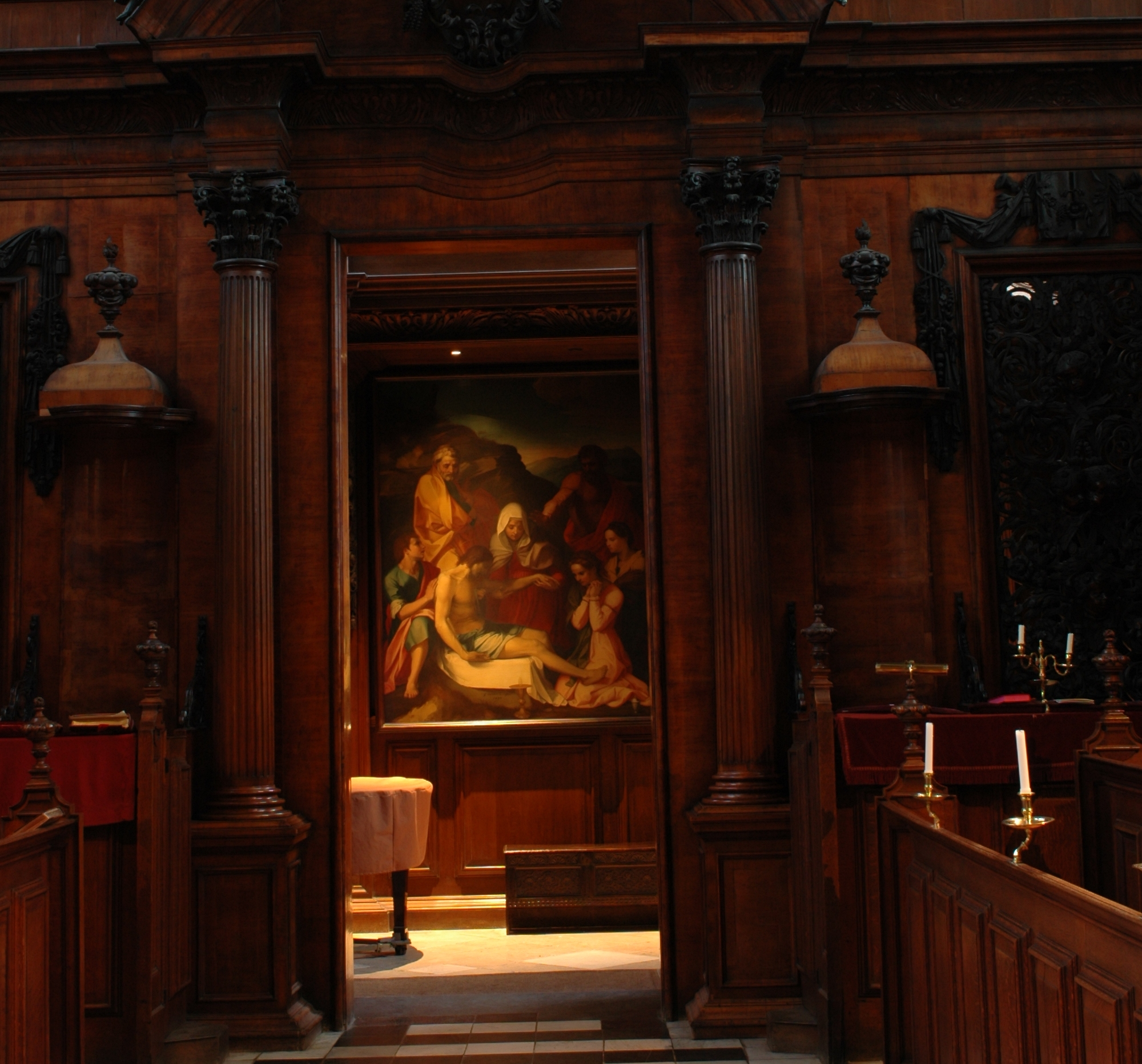
Chapel interior

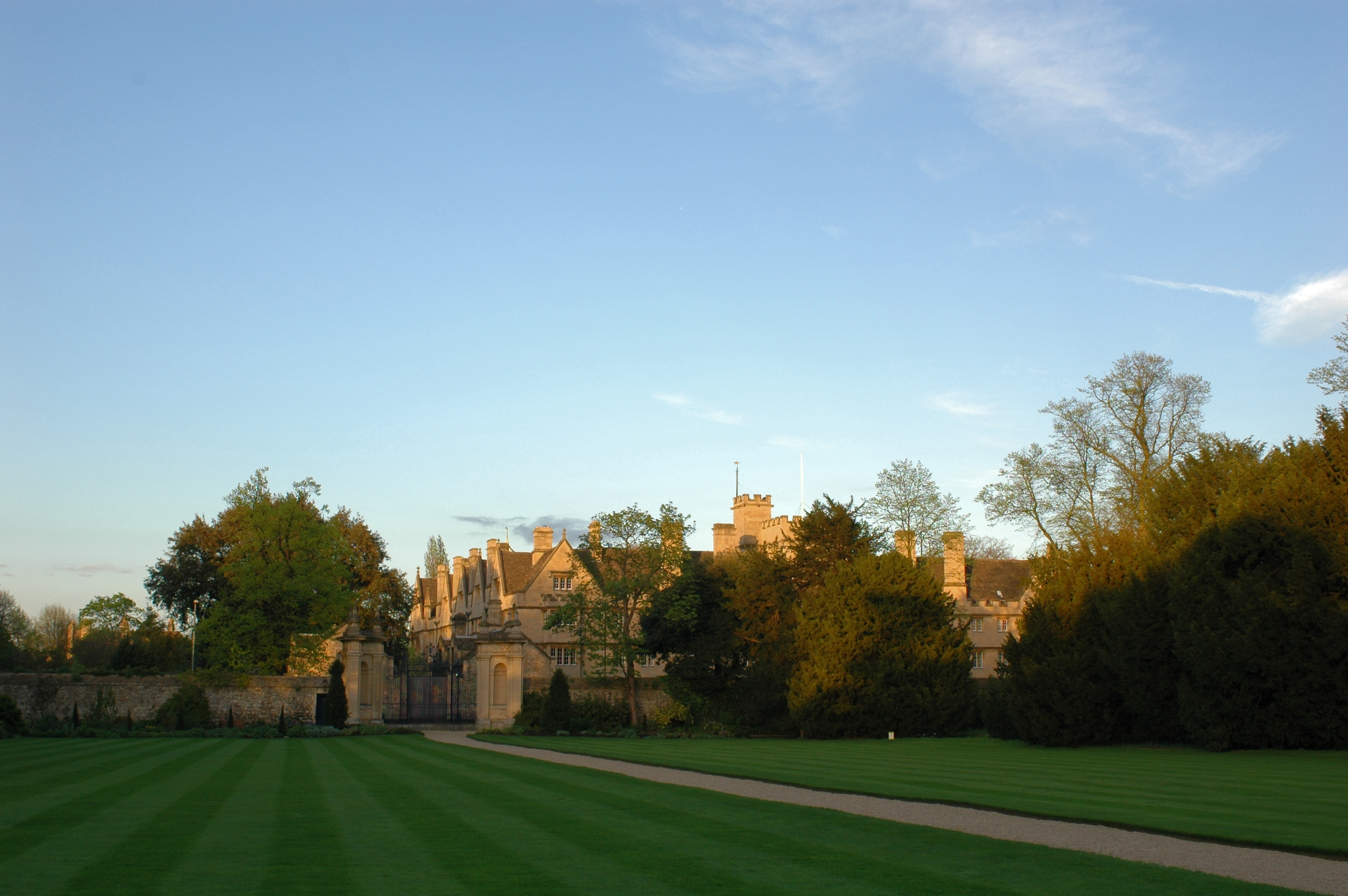
From the lawn looking towards Wadham College

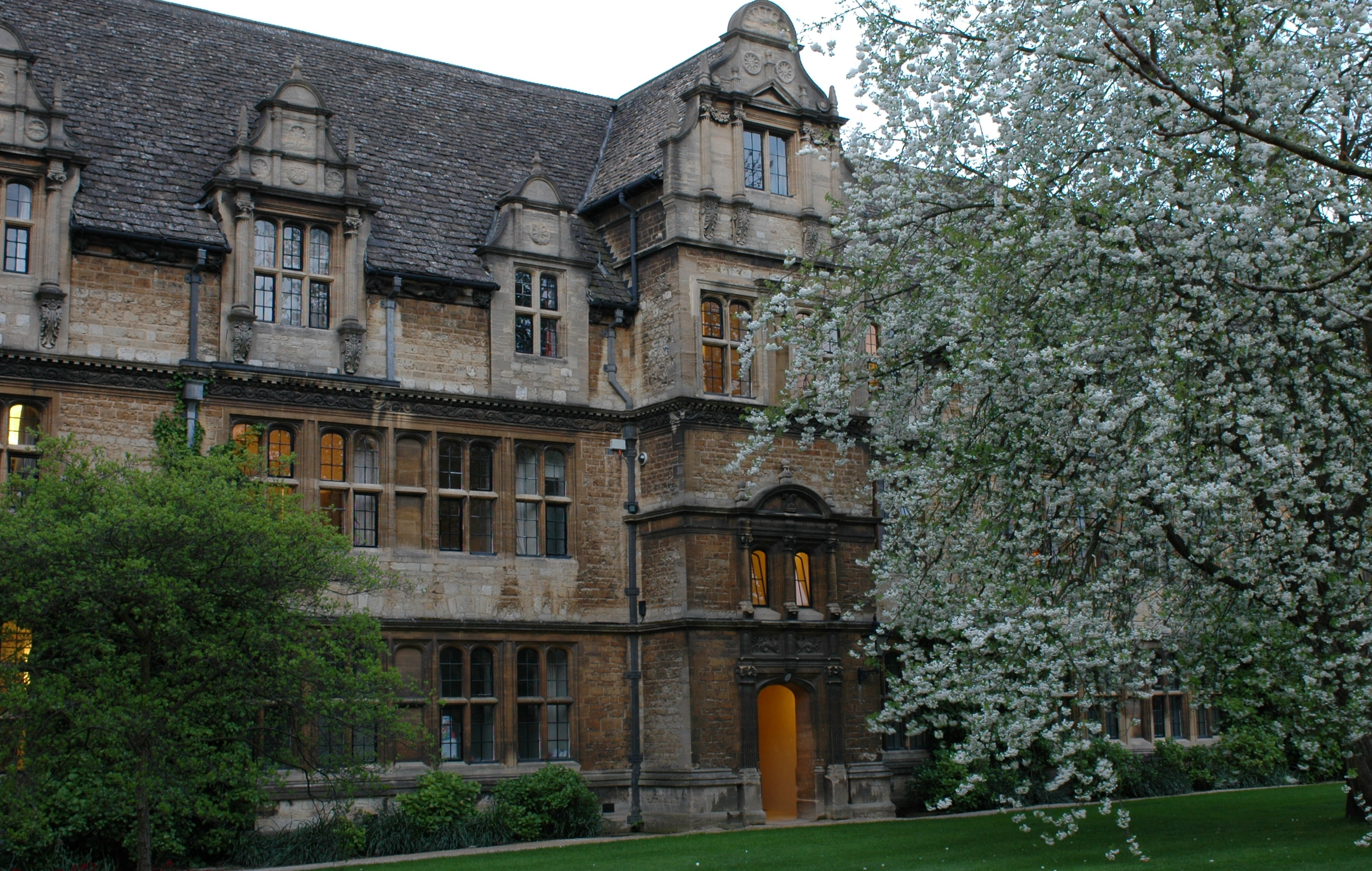
The Jackson Building (Staircase VI in Front Quad)

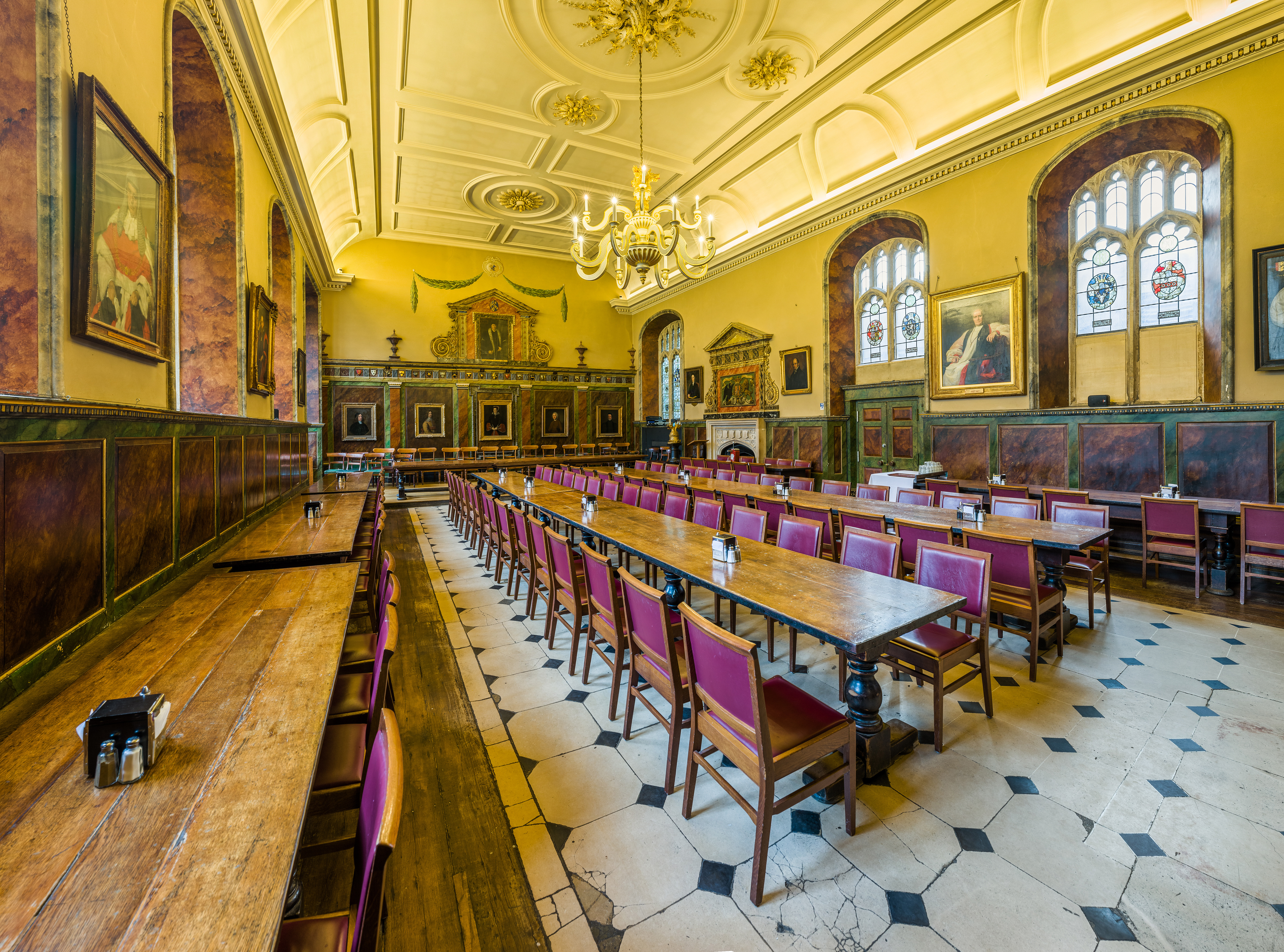
Dining hall prior to 2022-4 renovation

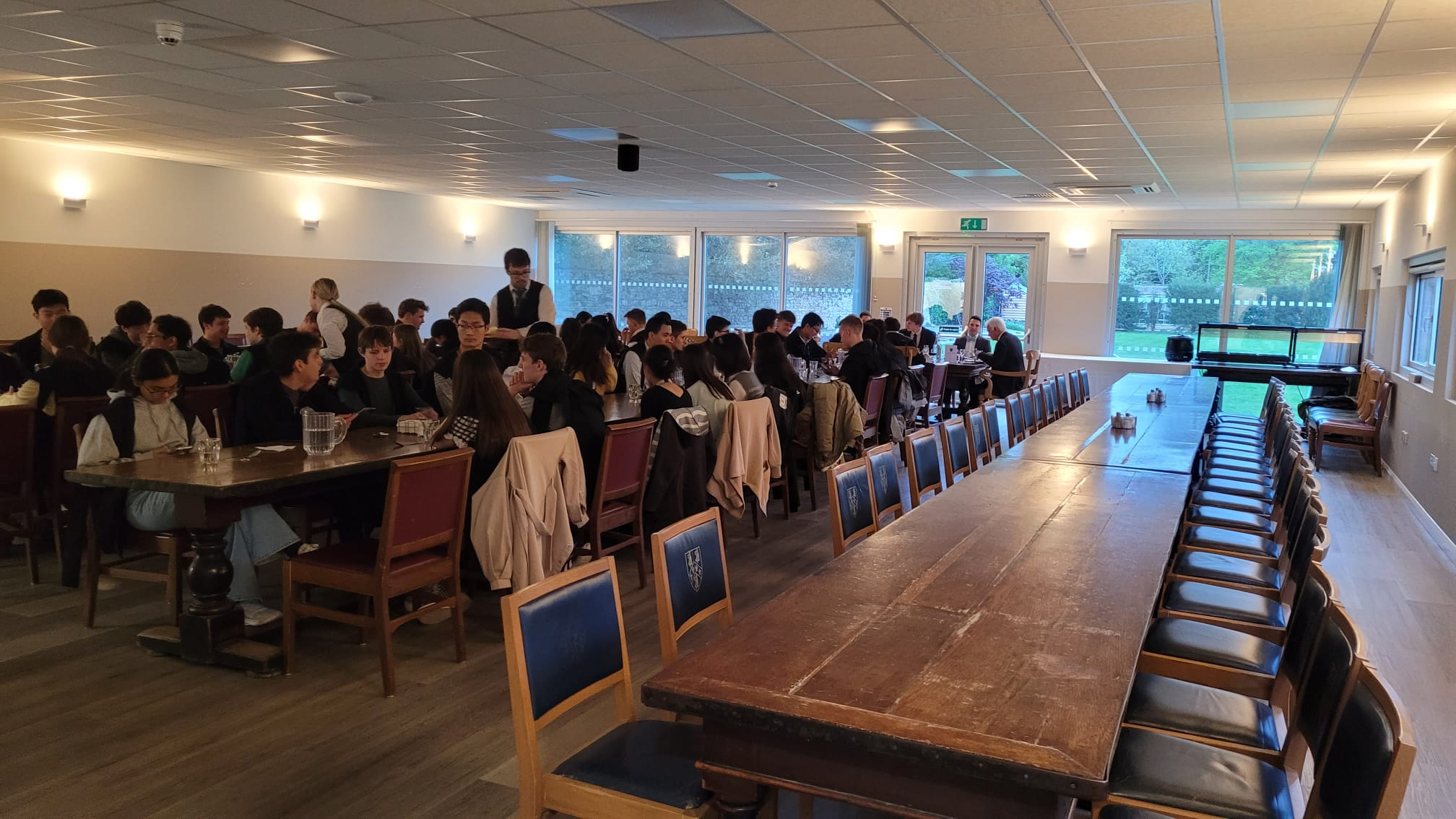
Temporary dining hall (2022–2024)
