= The September Society =

2008 novel by Charles Finch

- Cover art for The September Society
- Author: Charles Finch
- Language: English
- Series: Charles Lenox series
- Genre: Mystery, crime novel
- Publisher: St. Martin’s Press
- Publication date: August 5, 2008
- Pages: 320 (first edition, hardcover)
- ISBN: 978-0-312-35978-2
- Preceded by: A Beautiful Blue Death
- Followed by: The Fleet Street Murders

The September Society, by Charles Finch, is a mystery set in Oxford and London, England in the autumn of 1866, during the Victorian era. It is the second novel in a series featuring gentleman and amateur detective Charles Lenox, and the first of two books Finch has written about Oxford, along with The Last Enchantments.

== Plot summary ==
A student at Lincoln College at the University of Oxford goes missing. His mother engages Charles Lenox to solve the mystery of his disappearance. Lenox, himself a graduate of Oxford, revisits his alma mater to piece together the clues in this kidnapping case which, upon the discovery of a body, becomes a murder investigation. Eventually the trail leads Lenox back to London and the headquarters of a mysterious society.

Lenox’s evolving friendship and potential romance with his childhood friend and next-door neighbor Lady Jane is a central subplot. Additionally, the book introduces Lord John Dallington, a young wastrel aristocrat, as Lenox’s apprentice.

== Publication history ==
The September Society', was first published in hardcover by St. Martin’s Minotaur and released on August 5, 2008. The trade paperback was released in 2009. A large print edition was published by Center Point Publishing in February 2010.

== See also ==
- Literature in Oxford
