= Negus (drink) =

Spiced drink made of wine and hot water

Negus is a drink made of wine, often port, mixed with hot water, oranges or lemons, spices and sugar.

== History ==
According to Edmond Malone (Life of Dryden, Prose Work. i - p. 484) this drink was invented in the early 18th Century by Col. Francis Negus (d.1732), a British courtier (commissioner for executing the office of Master of the Horse from 1717 to 1727, then Master of the Buckhounds).

James Boswell refers to it repeatedly in his London Journal. Negus is also referred to in Jane Eyre by Charlotte Brontë, when Jane drinks it on arrival at Thornfield Hall. Jane Austen mentions it as part of the fare at a ball in Mansfield Park. In Wuthering Heights by Emily Brontë, Catherine is given it at Thrushcross Grange by the Lintons; it appears in several works by Charles Dickens, namely Sketches by Boz, The Pickwick Papers, A Christmas Carol (during the party at Fezziwig's), Dombey and Son, David Copperfield, Our Mutual Friend and Bleak House; in Harriette Wilson's Memoirs and Grace Dalrymple Elliott's Journal of My Life During the French Revolution; and in John Buchan's Midwinter. Anthony Trollope in The Small House at Allington portrays the rustic Earl de Guest's violent disgust at the thought of the drink. Negus makes a number of appearances as a tonic in The Forsyte Saga by John Galsworthy and in Patrick O'Brian's Aubrey-Maturin novels and a similar reference is made in Written in My Own Heart's Blood by Diana Gabaldon. In Death Comes to Pemberley by P.D. James, it is said to be added to a white soup. Arthur Conan Doyle has John give some negus to his sister Esther to quiet her in chapter 5 of The Mystery of Cloomber, and in A Death in the Small Hours by Charles Finch, the character Frederick Ponsonby claims that a glass of hot negus "settles the stomach wonderfully". In William Makepeace Thackeray's Vanity Fair, Ensign Stubble "never took his eyes off her except when the negus came in". In his Confessions of an English Opium-Eater, Thomas De Quincey relates that he usually took his laudanum infused in a glass of negus. Hyacinth Robinson is offered a glass of Negus three times by Mrs. Crookenden in The Princess Casamassima by Henry James.

The Sorrows of Werter/Goethe - "I had procured her some oranges from the sideboard, where they were making negus ..."

== Basic ingredients ==
Red, often Port, wine; lemon zest and juice; sugar; hot water.

== See also ==
- Glögg
- Hot Toddy
- Mulled cider
- Mulled wine
- Wassail
