= A Burial at Sea =

2011 novel by Charles Finch

- Cover art for A Burial at Sea
- Author: Charles Finch
- Language: English
- Series: Charles Lenox series
- Genre: Mystery, crime novel
- Publisher: St. Martin’s Press
- Publication date: November 2011
- Pages: 320 (first edition, hardcover)
- ISBN: 9780312625085
- Preceded by: A Stranger in Mayfair
- Followed by: A Death in the Small Hours

A Burial at Sea, by Charles Finch, is a set aboard a Royal Navy vessel in 1873 and in Egypt during the Victorian era. It is the fifth novel in the Charles Lenox series.

== Plot summary ==
Charles Lenox, gentleman and former amateur detective, is now a Member of Parliament, and his wife is expecting their first child. However, relations between the United Kingdom and France are increasing strained following the opening of the Suez Canal and several British agents have been murdered on French soil. Lenox is asked to undertake a secret mission to Egypt by Prime Minister Gladstone. However, the brutal murder of an officer on HMS Lucy has Lenox re-using his rusty investigation skills at the captain's request.

== Publication history ==
A Burial at Sea was first published in hardcover by St. Martin’s Minotaur and released November 2011. The trade paperback was released in August 2012.

== Reception ==
Finch received favorable reviews in several major newspapers. Publishers Weekly favorably compared Finch to Agatha Christie and Patrick O’Brian and said that A Burial at Sea was "the best in the series to date."
