= A Stranger in Mayfair =

2010 novel by Charles Finch

- First edition
- Author: Charles Finch
- Language: English
- Series: Charles Lenox series
- Genre: Mystery, crime novel
- Publisher: St. Martin’s Press
- Publication date: November 9, 2010
- Pages: 320 (first edition, hardcover)
- ISBN: 978-0-312-62506-1
- Preceded by: The Fleet Street Murders
- Followed by: A Burial at Sea

A Stranger in Mayfair, by Charles Finch, is a mystery set in Mayfair and surrounding neighborhoods in London, England during the Victorian era. It is the fourth novel in the Charles Lenox series.

== Plot summary ==
Charles Lenox, gentleman amateur detective, has recently married and has been elected to Parliament. Although Lenox plans to give up detection (due to the demands of his new vocation and to alleviate the concerns of his new wife), he is pulled into a case when a colleague in Parliament asks for help solving the murder of his footman.

== Publication history ==
A Stranger in Mayfair was first published in hardcover by St. Martin’s Minotaur and released on November 9, 2010. A large print edition was published by Center Point Publishing in June 2011. The trade paperback was released in July 2011.

== See also ==
- London in fiction
