= A Death in the Small Hours =

2012 novel by Charles Finch

- Cover art for A Death in the Small Hours
- Author: Charles Finch
- Language: English
- Series: Charles Lenox series
- Genre: Mystery, crime novel
- Publisher: Minotaur Books
- Publication date: November 2012
- Pages: 320 (first edition, hardcover)
- ISBN: 9781250011602
- Preceded by: A Burial at Sea
- Followed by: An Old Betrayal

A Death in the Small Hours, by Charles Finch, is a novel set in England during the Victorian era. It is the sixth novel in the Charles Lenox series.

== Plot summary ==
Charles Lenox, gentleman and former amateur detective, is now a prominent Member of the House of Commons. When selected to make the opening speech at the next session of Parliament, he takes up an offer to spend some time at his uncle’s estate in Somerset. Although Lenox expected to find a few quiet weeks to prepare his speech, instead he finds a bizarre case of vandalism in the quiet village, and the murder of a local constable. Lenox investigates and finds that the situation is far more complex and sinister than it first appeared.

== Publication history ==
A Death in the Small Hours was first published in hardcover by St. Martin’s Minotaur and released November 2012. The trade paperback was released in August 2013.

== Reception ==
Finch received favorable reviews in several major newspapers. Publishers Weekly called it “superb”
