= A Beautiful Blue Death =

Novel by Charles Finch

- Paperback cover
- Author: Charles Finch
- Language: English
- Series: Charles Lenox series
- Genre: Mystery, crime novel
- Published: 2007 (St. Martin’s Press)
- Pages: 320 (first edition, hardcover)
- ISBN: 978-0-312-35977-5
- Followed by: The September Society

A Beautiful Blue Death, by Charles Finch, is the first novel in a series of mysteries featuring Victorian gentleman and amateur detective Charles Lenox.

== Plot summary ==
The novel, set in 1865 London, follows Charles Lenox as he seeks to solve a murder. Lenox is an independently wealthy gentleman who enjoys solving crimes as a hobby, though he generally prefers to pass the cold winter days in his library with a cup of tea, a roaring fire and a good book. He is drawn into a new case when his lifelong friend and neighbor Lady Jane Grey makes a special request for his help. Prudence Smith, Grey's former housemaid, is dead in an apparent suicide. But Lenox immediately suspects foul play: murder by a rare and deadly poison. Smith lived and worked in the patrician house of George Barnard, a place full of suspects. While Smith played with more than a few hearts, the motive behind her death proves elusive.

When another body turns up during the season's most fashionable ball, Lenox must untangle the web of loyalties and animosities surrounding Barnard’s mansion. Lenox receives help with the task both from his faithful valet, Graham, and his friend, Dr. Thomas McConnell. Throughout the story, Lenox’s efforts are intermittently enabled or hampered by Scotland Yard Inspector James Exeter, who requires Lenox’s help with the case but wants always to appear in total control.

The subplots of the novel focus on Lenox's evolving personal relationship with Grey and McConnell's strained marriage to Lady Victoria "Toto" Phillips, all recurring characters in Finch's books.

== Awards and recognition ==
A Beautiful Blue Death was nominated for the Agatha Award for best first mystery of 2007.

The novel was also named one of Library Journal’s Best Books of 2007, one of only five mystery novels on the list.

== Publication history ==
A Beautiful Blue Death was first published in hardcover by St. Martin’s Minotaur and released on June 26, 2007. A large print edition was published by Thorndike Press in December of 2007. The trade paperback was released in 2008. The novel has been translated into German and Russian.

== Literary criticism ==
Finch received favorable reviews in several major newspapers. Kevin Allman of The Washington Post called A Beautiful Blue Death "a fine specimen of the genre" and noted that "particularly good is [Finch's] delineation of Lenox's cozy-but-proper relationship with Lady Jane." Publishers Weekly praised the book, saying that "lovers of quality historical whodunits will hope this is the first in a series."
