= The Fleet Street Murders =

2009 novel by Charles Finch

- Cover art for The Fleet Street Murders
- Author: Charles Finch
- Language: English
- Series: Charles Lenox series
- Genre: Mystery, crime novel
- Publisher: St. Martin’s Press
- Publication date: November 10, 2009
- Pages: 320 (first edition, hardcover)
- ISBN: 978-0-312-56551-0
- Preceded by: The September Society
- Followed by: A Stranger in Mayfair

The Fleet Street Murders, by Charles Finch, is the mystery set in London and in northern England in 1867 during the Victorian era. It is the third novel in the Charles Lenox series.

== Plot summary ==
While gentleman and amateur detective Charles Lenox is celebrating his engagement to his best friend and neighbor Lady Jane Grey, two journalists are murdered simultaneously across London. Lenox starts to involve himself in this strange case despite hostility from Scotland Yard, but soon must leave it behind to travel to Stirrington, in northern England, where he is running for a seat in Parliament. Once at Stirrington, he has to overcome local suspicion of an outsider, and faces a shock when Lady Jane sends him a letter casting doubt on their upcoming marriage. Meanwhile in London, the police have arrested two unlikely suspects. Lenox races back and forth between London and Stirrington to solve the crime, face the results of the election, and save his imperiled engagement. In the process, he discovers that the culprit is an old nemesis.

== Awards and recognition ==
The Fleet Street Murders was nominated for the Nero Award in 2010.

== Publication history ==
The Fleet Street Murders was first published in hardcover by St. Martin’s Minotaur and released on November 10, 2009. A large print edition was published by Center Point Publishing on December 1, 2009. The trade paperback was released on July 20, 2010.

== Literary criticism ==
Finch received favorable reviews in several major newspapers. Marilyn Stasio of the New York Times called The Fleet Street Murders "a beguiling Victorian mystery [with] an amiable gentleman sleuth cut from the same fine English broadcloth as Dorothy L. Sayers’s Lord Peter Wimsey." The Richmond Times-Dispatch praised the book, saying that "this third entry in Finch’s series shows the author at his confident best, with a well-conceived story [and] an honorable and amiable hero."
