= Mother London =

Book by Michael Moorcock

- Dust-jacket from the first edition
- Author: Michael Moorcock
- Cover artist: Peter Dyer
- Language: English
- Genre: Literary fiction
- Publisher: Secker & Warburg
- Publication date: 1988
- Publication place: United Kingdom
- Media type: Print (hardback)
- Pages: 496 pp
- ISBN: 0-436-28461-8
- OCLC: 17917718
- Followed by: King of the City

Mother London is a novel by Michael Moorcock. Published in 1988, it was shortlisted for the Whitbread Prize. Although the city of London itself is perhaps the central character, it follows three outpatients from a mental hospital—a music hall artist (Josef Kiss), a reclusive writer (David Mummery) and a woman just awoken from a long coma (Mary Gasalee)—who experience the history of the city from the Blitz to the late eighties through chaotic experience and sensory delusions. The novel is a non-chronological compilation of episodes, snippets and sidelines, rather than a single cohesive narrative. A piece in The Guardian called it 'a great, humane document'.

Michael Moorcock was the editor of New Worlds and gained numerous critical acclaim and media attention.
