= The Last Enchantments =

Novel by Charles Finch

- First edition cover
- Author: Charles Finch
- Language: English
- Publisher: St. Martin’s Press
- Publication date: January 28, 2014
- Publication place: United States
- Media type: Print (hardback)
- Pages: 336
- ISBN: 978-1-250-01871-7

The Last Enchantments is a novel by American author Charles Finch. It was published by St. Martin’s Press and released on January 28, 2014.

== Plot ==
The Last Enchantments tells the story of American graduate student Will Baker, and his relationships with friends and paramours, during his time at the University of Oxford. The book follows them through a tumultuous academic year at the fictional Fleet College, which is based in equal parts on Lady Margaret Hall, Trinity College, Oxford, and Merton College.

== Reception ==
In a starred review, Library Journal wrote "In prose that glides effortlessly from scene to scene, Finch captures the fleeting time in people's lives when their every decision, from career to lover, seems freighted with eternal consequence . . . A vividly evocative love letter to his alma mater, Finch's first contemporary novel . . . often reads less like fiction than as memoir, and will be enjoyed by readers of both."

Publishers Weekly wrote “the strength of Finch’s novel is its vivid portrayal of Oxford University in all its history, along with the school’s ancient and quirky traditions, and colorful student body and faculty.”

Kirkus Reviews wrote “Finch brings each character to life with striking effectiveness as they struggle with issues of class, the political climate, academics and their futures. A portrait of university life that’s contemplative and nostalgic.”
