= King of the City =

2000 novel by Michael Moorcock

- Dust-jacket from the first edition.
- Author: Michael Moorcock
- Language: English
- Genre: Fantasy novel
- Publisher: Scribners
- Publication date: 2000
- Publication place: United Kingdom
- Media type: Print (hardback and paperback)
- Pages: 421 pp
- ISBN: 0-684-86143-7
- OCLC: 43338149
- Preceded by: Mother London

King of the City (2000) is a novel by Michael Moorcock. It is a satire on modern London and its literary scene and, in part, a sequel to Mother London . Narrated by celebrity photographer and erstwhile rock star Dennis Dover, it charts a chaotic ride through London from the sixties to the end of the century.

Courtenay Grimwood, writing in The Guardian, said it showed the writer at his "funniest, wittiest and most deadly -- with a furious rant about exactly what is wrong with London, Britain, America and the planet (and a few pertinent suggestions as to the cure)". Horror writer Kim Newman, reviewing it in The Independent, wrote that "King of the City is at once splenetic and hilarious, tearing into people and institutions who deserve it, yet affectionate about the many different, vital worlds of London and its denizens"; Carmela Ciuraru praised its "brilliant ideas" in The Washington Post.

== Reception ==
Jeff Zaleski, in his review for Publishers Weekly, said that "Moorcock includes real people, like Johnny Lydon, and a host of fictional characters, like the Quentin Crisp--like actor, Norrie Stripling, as though the book were Moorcock's version of the Sgt. Pepper album cover: private favorites and public enemies. Fans of Moorcock's science fiction might find the references hard going, but readers of his Booker Prize-nominated Mother London will enjoy the novel's angry rant against the vices of the age". Marc Kloszewski said in his review for Library Journal that "despite the topical references, most readers stateside should find it fascinating and highly entertaining. And despite the lack of traditional sf elements, the book is dense with activity and detail and presents a kaleidoscopic view of London, which will likely appeal to fans of Moorcock's previous popular works".
