= Charles Finch =

American author and literary critic (born 1980)

- Born: 1980 (age 45–46); New York City, U.S.
- Education: Yale University (BA); Merton College, Oxford
- Occupation: Author
- Writing career
- Genres: Mystery novels Literary fiction Literary Criticism

Charles Finch (born 1980) is an American author and literary critic. He has written a series of mystery novels set in Victorian era England, as well as literary fiction and numerous essays and book reviews.

== Life and career ==
Finch was born in New York City the son of the art critic Charlie Finch. He graduated from Phillips Academy and Yale University, where he majored in English and History. He also holds a master's degree in Renaissance English Literature from Merton College, Oxford. He is the grandson of American artist and writer Anne Truitt.

His first published novel, A Beautiful Blue Death, introduced gentleman sleuth Charles Lenox. The book was named one of Library Journal’s Best Books of 2007 and was nominated for the Agatha Award for best new mystery of 2007. The Fleet Street Murders came out in 2009 and was nominated for the Nero Award. The Woman in the Water, released in 2018, is a prequel presenting the beginning of Lenox’s career in detection. The series is published by St. Martin's Minotaur, a division of St. Martin's Press.

Finch's first contemporary novel, The Last Enchantments, was published by St. Martin's Press in early 2014.

He has written for The New York Times and Slate and regularly writes essays and criticism for The New York Times, The New York Times Book Review, The New Yorker, The Guardian, the Chicago Tribune and USA Today. He was a 2014 finalist for the National Book Critics Circle's Nona Balakian Citation for Excellence in Reviewing, losing to Alexandra Schwartz of The New Yorker. He won the award in 2017.

Finch serves on the curatorial board of the arts colony Ragdale and the board of the National Book Critics Circle.

== Bibliography ==
=== Charles Lenox series ===
- A Beautiful Blue Death, 2007 Hardcover ISBN 978-0-312-35977-5
  - 2007 Large print ISBN 978-0-7862-9921-8
  - 2008 Paperback ISBN 978-0-312-38607-8
  - 2009 German translation (Bella Indigo) ISBN 978-3-404-15989-5
  - 2010 Russian translation (Прекрасная голубая смерть) ISBN 978-5-17-052226-2
  - 2011 Audio ISBN 978-1-4526-5454-6
- The September Society, 2008 Hardcover ISBN 978-0-312-35978-2
  - 2009 Paperback ISBN 978-0-312-56494-0
  - 2010 Large print ISBN 978-1-60285-666-0
  - 2010 German translation (September Society der Club der tödlichen Gentlemen) ISBN 978-3-404-16378-6
  - 2011 Audio ISBN 978-1-4526-5455-3
- The Fleet Street Murders, 2009 Hardcover ISBN 978-0-312-56551-0
  - 2009 Large print ISBN 978-1-60285-655-4
  - 2010 Paperback ISBN 978-0-312-65027-8
  - 2011 Audio ISBN 978-1-4526-5456-0
- A Stranger in Mayfair, 2010 Hardcover ISBN 978-0-312-62506-1
  - 2011 Audio ISBN 978-1-4526-5457-7
  - 2011 Large print ISBN 978-1-61173-080-7
  - 2011 Paperback ISBN 978-0-312-61695-3
- A Burial at Sea, 2011 Hardcover ISBN 978-0-312-62508-5
  - 2011 Audio ISBN 978-1-4526-5458-4
  - 2012 Paperback ISBN 978-1-2500-0814-5
  - 2012 Large print ISBN 978-1-6117-3321-1
- A Death in the Small Hours, 2012 Hardcover ISBN 978-1-250-01160-2
  - 2012 Audio ISBN 978-1-6240-6152-3
  - 2013 Large print ISBN 978-1-6117-3641-0
  - 2013 Paperback ISBN 978-1-2500-3149-5
- An Old Betrayal, 2013 Hardcover ISBN 978-1-2500-1161-9
  - 2013 Audio ISBN 978-1-6240-6777-8
  - 2014 Large print ISBN 978-1-6117-3961-9
  - 2014 Paperback ISBN 978-1-2500-4910-0
- The Laws of Murder, 2014 Hardcover ISBN 978-1-250-05130-1
  - 2014 Audio ISBN 978-1-4272-4365-2
  - 2015 Large print ISBN 978-1-6289-9420-9
  - 2015 Paperback ISBN 978-1-2500-6744-9
- Home by Nightfall, 2015 Hardcover ISBN 978-1-250-07041-8
  - 2016 Audio ISBN 978-1-5012-6269-2
  - 2016 Large print ISBN 978-1-6289-9974-7
  - 2016 Paperback ISBN 978-1-2500-9364-6
- The Inheritance, 2016 Hardcover ISBN 978-1-250-07042-5
  - 2016 Audio ISBN 978-1-5012-6275-3
  - 2017 Large print ISBN 978-1-6832-4280-2
  - 2017 Paperback ISBN 978-1-2501-3019-8
- The Woman in the Water (prequel), 2018 Hardcover ISBN 978-1-250-13946-7
  - 2018 Audio ISBN 978-1-5414-1522-5
  - 2019 Paperback ISBN 978-1-250-13947-4
- The Vanishing Man (prequel), 2019 Hardcover ISBN 978-1-250-31136-8
  - 2019 Audio ISBN 978-1-250-31820-6
  - 2021 Paperback ISBN 978-1-250-31137-5
- The Last Passenger (prequel), 2020 Hardcover ISBN 978-1-250-31220-4
  - 2020 Audio ISBN 978-1-250-26117-5
  - 2021 Paperback ISBN 978-1-250-31221-1
- An Extravagant Death, 2021 Hardcover ISBN 9781250767134
  - 2021 Audio ISBN 9781250767134

=== Other work ===
- The Last Enchantments, 2014 Hardcover ISBN 978-1-2500-1871-7
  - Paperback ISBN 978-1-2500-6325-0
  - Large print ISBN 978-1-4272-4365-2
  - Audio ISBN 978-1-4272-4138-2
- What Just Happened?, 2021
