= Simon Curtis (filmmaker) =

British director and producer (born 1960)

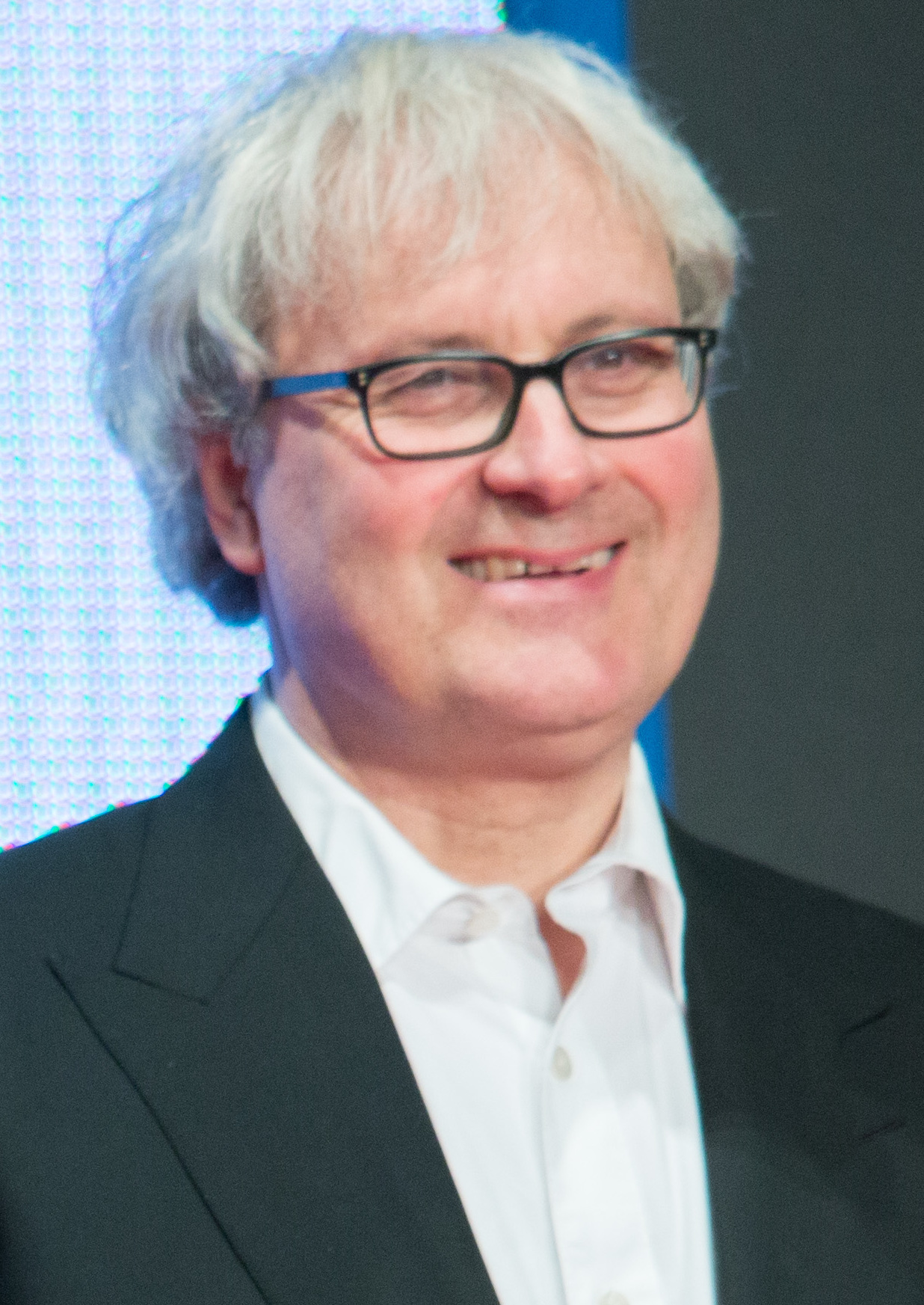
- Curtis in 2015
- Born: 11 March 1960 (age 66); London, England
- Spouse: Elizabeth McGovern (m. 1992)
- Children: 2

Simon Curtis (born 11 March 1960) is an English director and producer. He has worked in theatre, television and film.

== Career ==
Curtis began his career working at the Royal Court Theatre. His first job was assistant director for Caryl Churchill's Top Girls. He later became assistant director to both Danny Boyle and Max Stafford-Clark. Theatre productions Curtis has worked on include the world premiere of Road, A Lie of the Mind, Roots, Dinner with Friends and The Rise and Fall of Little Voice. In 2010, Curtis directed Serenading Louie at the Donmar Warehouse.

In 1996, Curtis directed episodes of the television comedy series Tracey Takes On... for HBO. He also directed the three-part television drama Twenty Thousand Streets Under the Sky for BBC Four in 2005. The serial is an adaptation of Patrick Hamilton's 20,000 Streets Under the Sky novels.

He directed the BBC's adaptation of Elizabeth Gaskell's Cranford in 2007. In June 2009, Curtis directed two new episodes of Cranford for the Christmas period. Titled Return to Cranford, the episodes were aired from 20 December 2009.

In August 2008, Curtis directed the one-off television drama A Short Stay in Switzerland for the BBC. The drama, featuring Julie Walters, was based on the true story of Dr. Anne Turner, who decided to take her own life at a Dignitas clinic in 2006. A Short Stay in Switzerland was nominated for Best Single Drama at the Royal Television Society Awards and the British Academy Television Awards.

In 2004, Curtis approached producer David Parfitt about making a film based on The Prince, The Showgirl and Me and My Week with Marilyn; two diary accounts written by Colin Clark about his time with Marilyn Monroe. Adrian Hodges wrote and adapted the screenplay for the film called My Week with Marilyn. Curtis and Parfitt went to BBC Films and the UK Film Council and they put up the money for development. Curtis then approached Harvey Weinstein who financed the film. My Week with Marilyn was filmed in late 2010 and released in November 2011.

In 2015, Curtis directed and executive produced the biographical film Woman in Gold, starring Helen Mirren as Maria Altmann, a Holocaust survivor attempting to recover a portrait of her aunt painted by Gustav Klimt which was stolen from her family by the Nazis and had eventually become property of the government of Austria, and closely connected to Austrian identity. Curtis' wife Elizabeth McGovern has a small role as a court judge in the film.

Curtis directed the 2019 feature film adaptation of Garth Stein's The Art of Racing in the Rain, starring Milo Ventimiglia and Amanda Seyfried.

In April 2021, it was announced Curtis would direct Downton Abbey: A New Era, the sequel to the first film and television series of the same name.

== Personal life ==
Curtis was born in London. He married American actress Elizabeth McGovern in 1992. The couple have two daughters and live in Chiswick, London.

== Filmography ==
=== Film ===
Year	Title	Director	Executive producer
2011	My Week with Marilyn	Yes	Yes
2015	Woman in Gold	Yes	Yes
2017	Goodbye Christopher Robin	Yes	No
2018	The Chaperone	No	Yes
2019	The Art of Racing in the Rain	Yes	No
2022	Downton Abbey: A New Era	Yes	No
2025	Downton Abbey: The Grand Finale	Yes	No

=== Television ===
Year	Title	Director	Producer	Notes
1996	Tracey Takes On...	Yes	No	4 episodes
2003	The Practice	Yes	No	Episode "Blessed Are They"
2005–2006	The Virgin Queen	No	Executive	4 episodes
2008	Freezing	No	Yes	3 episodes
2009	Hunter	No	Executive	2 episodes
2011–2012	Threesome	No	Executive	14 episodes
2014	Black Box	Yes	No	2 episodes
2015–2016	Indian Summers	No	Executive	20 episodes

TV movies

- My Summer with Des (1998)
- Man and Boy (2002)
- A Short Stay in Switzerland (2009)

Miniseries

Year	Title	Notes
1999	David Copperfield	
2005	Twenty Thousand Streets Under the Sky	
2007–2009	Cranford	7 episodes

=== Theatre ===
As a director

Year	Title	Playwright	Venue	Ref.
1986	Road	Jim Cartwright	Royal Court Theater, West End	
1987	A Lie of the Mind	Sam Shepard	Royal Court Theater, West End	
1988	Road	Jim Cartwright	Lincoln Center Theater, Off-Broadway	
1993	The Rise and Fall of Little Voice	Jim Cartwright	Steppenwolf Theater Company, Chicago	
1994	The Rise and Fall of Little Voice	Jim Cartwright	Neil Simon Theater, Broadway	
2001	Dinner with Friends	Donald Margulies	Hampstead Theatre, West End	
2010	Serenading Louie	Lanford Wilson	Donmar Warehouse, West End	

== Awards and nominations ==
Organizations	Year	Category	Nominated work	Result	Ref.
BAFTA Film Awards	2011	Outstanding British Film	My Week with Marilyn	Nominated	
BAFTA TV Awards	1992	Best Single Drama	The Trials of Oz	Nominated	
BAFTA TV Awards	1993	Best Single Drama	A Doll's House	Nominated	
BAFTA TV Awards	2008	Best Drama Serial	Five Days	Nominated	
BAFTA TV Awards	2008	Best Drama Serial	Cranford	Nominated	
BAFTA TV Awards	2010	Best Single Drama	A Short Stay in Switzerland	Nominated	
Laurence Olivier Awards	1986	Best Newcomer in Theater	Road	Nominated	
Primetime Emmy Awards	2005	Outstanding Children's Program	Pride	Nominated	
