= John Stride =

English actor (1936–2018)

- Born: John Edward Stride; 11 July 1936; London, England
- Died: 20 April 2018 (aged 81)
- Occupation: Actor
- Years active: 1959–1993
- Spouses: Virginia Thomas (m. 1958, divorced) April Wilding (m. 1972; died 2003)
- Children: 3

John Edward Stride (11 July 1936 – 20 April 2018) was an English actor best known for his television work in the 1970s.

== Biography ==
Stride was born in London, the son of Margaret (née Prescott) and Alfred Teneriffe Stride. He attended Alleyn's School, Dulwich, and trained at RADA, where he met his first wife, Virginia Stride (née Thomas).

He made his first, uncredited, screen appearance in the film Sink the Bismarck! (1960). He also played the role of Bob, the barman, in the film Bitter Harvest (1963), based on the trilogy 20,000 Streets Under the Sky by Patrick Hamilton. He made his West End debut in February 1959 in Five Finger Exercise. Directed by John Gielgud, the show featured another debutante, Juliet Mills, aged 17. It ran at the Comedy Theatre for 608 performances. He appeared at the Old Vic as Romeo in Franco Zeffirelli's long-running production of Romeo and Juliet, first staged in 1960, with Judi Dench, and also as Prince Hal in Henry IV, Part 1.

At the end of the 1960s he played Rosencrantz at the Old Vic, in the National Theatre Company's production of Tom Stoppard's play Rosencrantz and Guildenstern Are Dead. During the 1970s Stride appeared in two Shakespeare production made for the large and small screen respectively. In Roman Polanski's version of Macbeth (1971) he played the role of Ross. For the BBC Television Shakespeare production of Shakespeare's Henry VIII (1979) he was cast in the title role.

Stride developed a career in popular television drama series. In the Yorkshire Television series The Main Chance (1969–75) he played the solicitor David Main, the television role with which he became most closely associated; it ran for four series. A later series made by the same ITV franchise holder with Stride and Julia Foster in the lead, Wilde Alliance (1978), lasted for only one season, although viewing figures had been good. He also played one of the main parts in the BBC's adaptation of Kingsley Amis's novel The Old Devils (1992). BBC producer Adrian Mourby wrote that "John Stride actually played the lead in The Old Devils, the character of Alun Weaver. The part fitted him perfectly. He was a fine actor, although self-destructively volatile. When I proposed to Penguin Books that the tie-in paperback was reissued with the Old Devils themselves on the front cover and John on the back – because Alun was an interloper and catalyst in their world – he rang me up late at night and threatened to kill me. Up until that point John was making the life of the production manager hell. Then he turned his attention to me and was unremittingly unpleasant on set. It was almost as if he needed someone to hate in order to generate the energy that infused his acting. I'm pleased to say that he never attempted to actually carry out his threat and I remained impressed by his skill as an actor. He was vital to the success of this miniseries. It did strike me, however, that his pyrotechnic volatility might be why he only worked once with each of the producers who admired him."

Stride died on 20 April 2018, aged 81, in a care home after being discharged from Sandford Ward at the Fulbrook Centre, Oxford.

== Filmography ==
Year	Title	Role	Notes
1960	Sink the Bismarck!	Tom Shepard – 'Ark Royal' Air Gunner	Uncredited
1963	Bitter Harvest	Bob Williams	
1967	A Flea in Her Ear	Romain Tournel	TV movie
1970	Papillons	Robert Schumann	TV movie
1971	Macbeth	Ross	
1972	Something to Hide	Sergeant Tom Winnington	
1973	John Keats: His Life and Death	Keats	
1974	Juggernaut	Hughes	
1975	Brannigan	Insp. Traven	
1976	The Omen	The Psychiatrist	
1977	A Bridge Too Far	Grenadier Guards Major	
1978	The Ice House	Paul	TV movie
1979	BBC Television Shakespeare	King Henry VIII	TV movie
1980	Oh Heavenly Dog	Alistair Becket	
1983	Conversations with a Stranger	Englishman	TV movie
1985	Thirteen at Dinner	Film Director	TV movie
1985	Macho	Jack Forest	TV movie
1988	Hanna's War	Dr. Komoly	
1992	Growing Rich	Sir Bernard Bellamy	TV movie
