= Laird Cregar =

American actor (1913–1944)

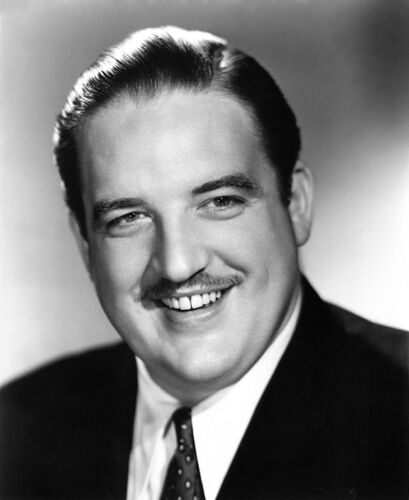
- Cregar in the 1940s
- Born: Samuel Laird Cregar; July 28, 1913; Philadelphia, Pennsylvania, U.S.
- Died: December 9, 1944 (aged 31); Los Angeles, California, U.S.
- Resting place: Forest Lawn Memorial Park, Glendale, California, U.S.
- Occupation: Actor
- Years active: 1938–1944

Samuel Laird Cregar (known professionally as Laird Cregar, July 28, 1913 – December 9, 1944) was an American stage and film actor. Cregar was best known for his performances of villains or psychologially disturbed persons in films such as I Wake Up Screaming (1941), This Gun For Hire (1942) and The Lodger (1944).

Cregar's screen career began in 1940 with small uncredited roles in films. By 1941, he had signed a film contract with 20th Century Fox. Cregar quickly rose to stardom, appearing in a variety of genres from film noir to screwball comedy to horror movies. He was a popular actor at the time of his death in 1944 at age 31, a result of complications from binge dieting undertaken to suit him for leading man roles.

== Early life ==
Laird Cregar was born in Philadelphia, the youngest of six sons of Elizabeth (née Smith) and Edward Matthews Cregar. His father earned his living as a tailor. He was also a cricketer, a member and later the coach of a team called the Gentlemen of Philadelphia, which toured internationally in the late 1890s and early 1900s. He followed his older brothers into the public school system until, not yet 16, he ran away to Miami and then Hollywood. He was back home with his brothers and widowed mother to be recorded by the census of March 1930.

== Early career ==
He spent a year in 1934/35 as a cadet in the Merchant Marine and then acted in productions of the Hedgerow Theater, an amateur company in Rose Valley, Pennsylvania. He later reported that he acted with other stock companies in Philadelphia and wrote some plays that were performed by amateur groups.

In 1936, Cregar persuaded the Philadelphia Rotary Club to support him with a $400 loan to study acting and gain on-stage experience at California's Pasadena Playhouse, where he remained for about two years without being noticed. He later said Thomas Browne Henry of the Playhouse gave him the best advice he possibly could, telling him "not to lose a pound of weight, but instead to develop a thin man's personality".

Returning to Pennsylvania, he appeared in small roles for little money in several productions mounted by the Federal Theatre at Bryn Mawr College's Goodhart Hall. He returned to the Pasadena Playhouse and took more small roles, finally getting noticed by Variety for his work in The Great American Family. As Lee Shippey, a Los Angeles Times columnist and the author of the novel from which the play was adapted, remembered: "There was only a small part in the first scene... but Laird was glad to get it–and it was almost entirely due to his superb acting that the play started with a bang which made all the bored Hollywood scouts sit up and get interested." He kept his role when the leads were replaced for a new production that hoped to reach Broadway, but he appeared only in Pasadena and San Francisco before the show closed.

== Early film career ==
Cregar made his film debut with a pair of uncredited appearances as a court clerk in Granny Get Your Gun (1940) and as a mechanic in Oh Johnny, How You Can Love (1940). Unable to find work for months, some friends let him sleep in their car.

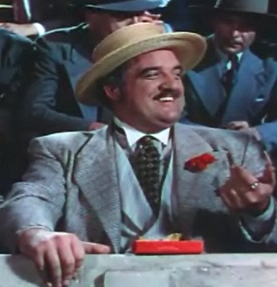
In Blood and Sand (1941)

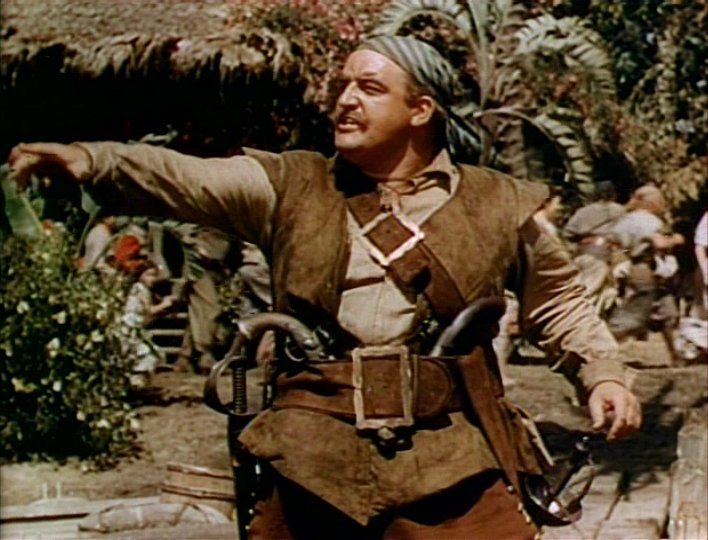
In the role of Sir Henry Morgan in The Black Swan (1942)

Impressed that the English actor Robert Morley–a man his own height and girth–had scored a triumph onstage in the play Oscar Wilde in both London in 1936 and in New York in 1938, Cregar determined to duplicate that success. A few years later he told an interviewer:

Every actor not of normal size and shape, I perceived, must make his own break.... I had been going on the assumption that, because I knew I had what it takes, others would be aware of it, too. Now I realized that I would have to force the knowledge on them, with a bludgeon, if necessary. Oscar Wilde, it came to me, must be the bludgeon used.

He persuaded a pair of inexperienced producers to back a production of the controversial play and Cregar opened as Wilde at the El Capitan Theatre on Hollywood Boulevard on April 22, 1940. The production was a triumph for Cregar, the Los Angeles Times saying he "scored a sensational success". John Barrymore saw him and said he was one of the most gifted young stage actors in the past 10 years.

Cregar's performance immediately attracted the interest of Hollywood studios: Cregar was tested for the second lead in The Letter (1940) and made screen tests for MGM and Paramount. The team behind Oscar Wilde considered mounting a biographical drama based on the life of Muhammad for him. He was tested by 20th Century Fox, which considered him as a replacement for Tyrone Power in The Great Commandment (1939).

Cregar performed Oscar Wilde for a two-week run in San Francisco, then signed with 20th Century Fox. They announced him for The Californian, which was not made, but Cregar was then cast in the big-budget historical movie Hudson's Bay (1941), where opposite Paul Muni he appeared "mountainous". He followed this up supporting Tyrone Power in Blood and Sand (also 1941), although he came down with measles during production, forcing filming to shut down for a week.

He then played the father of college student James Ellison, an actor three years older than he was, in the perennial comedy Charley's Aunt (1941). He portrayed an obsessed detective in I Wake Up Screaming (1941), "looking very elephantine and a shade on the psychopathic side" according to Bosley Crowther.

John Chapman of the Chicago Daily Tribune predicted he would become one of the "stars of 1942". RKO borrowed him for Joan of Paris (1942), where he gave a light touch to the film's villain, the suave German governor of occupied Paris. Cregar briefly returned to the stage to appear in the title role of The Man Who Came to Dinner and was well received. Paramount borrowed him for This Gun for Hire (1942), a film noir. Cregar appeared opposite Veronica Lake and Alan Ladd as the "unctuous, deceitful epicure" who double crosses his hired gun.

He followed that with the successful screwball comedy Rings on Her Fingers (1942) playing a con artist opposite Gene Tierney. Then in Ten Gentlemen from West Point (1942) he played a villainous army commander "whose sole aim is to break the spirits of the first batch of [West Point] cadets". Finally, his busy 1942 ended with The Black Swan (1942), a childish fantasy of swashbuckling pirates in which Cregar "bellows oaths like an irate opera singer" opposite Tyrone Power and Maureen O'Hara. After losing weight through a well-publicized hospital stay, Cregar appeared only in the opening and closing scenes that frame the action of Ernst Lubitsch's Heaven Can Wait (1943), playing "the friendliest, most reassuring Devil to appear onscreen", a "warm-hearted character unlike other film devils and most of Cregar's other roles".

Other performance opportunities came along with his success in studio features. These included radio roles on Lux Radio Theater in 1943 and a guest spot on The Eddie Cantor Show in April 1944.

== Film stardom ==
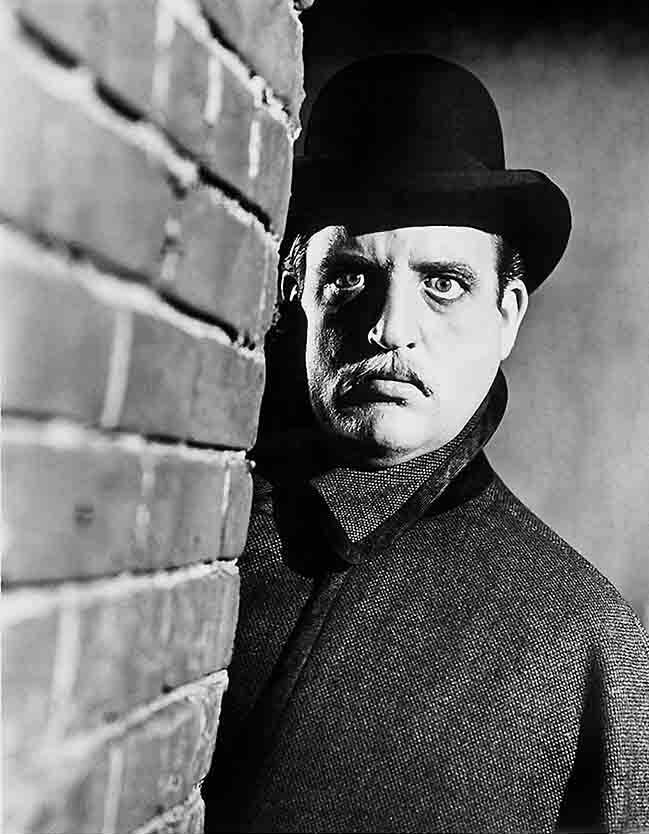
Cregar in the starring role in The Lodger (1944)

In March 1943, Fox announced Cregar to star in The Lodger (1944), as a character much like Jack the Ripper. Cregar began crash diets to lose weight, hoping to give the character a "romantic veneer". In its review, Variety declared the film "Laird Cregar's picture", and called it "as much a psychological study" of his character as a suspense film. His character's obsession with his dead brother provided a moment of "true pathos". The killer says his brother's portrait is "more beautiful than a beautiful woman" and he is reduced to tears.

Hoping to escape being typecast as a villain in his next film, Cregar got Fox to buy the rights to a recent best-seller, Patrick Hamilton's Hangover Square, published in the U.S. in 1942. Set in England in 1939, its central character George Bone is a pitiful alcoholic who suffers from psychotic episodes. He is exploited by the woman he worships until he kills her and her lover and then takes his own life. Screenwriter Barré Lyndon, largely at Zanuck's insistence, turned it into another film noir modeled on Jack the Ripper, setting the story in 1903 so that some of the sets from The Lodger could be used, dropping the alcoholism and adding several murders. Cregar was appalled by the script and refused to perform, which led Marlene Dietrich, who was about to sign on to the project, to abandon it. Zanuck put Cregar on suspension without salary for eight weeks and denied him leave to perform in Billy Rose's Broadway production of Shakespeare's Henry VIII, a role Cregar thought could make him a leading man. Cregar relented after two weeks, and filming went forward, though Cregar was uncooperative, resentful of his treatment by Zanuck, and suffering from health problems exacerbated by a crash diet. The film Hangover Square (1945), released after Cregar's death, received a mixed reception.

British critic Leslie Halliwell described Cregar as "American actor who had a tragically brief but impressive career in a rich variety of roles." He praised the actor "For providing such a memorable gallery of middle-aged characters while still in his early twenties." Leonard Maltin characterized him as "Hulking, brutish character actor whose heavy-lidded gaze and coldly sinister voice made him an ideal movie heavy in the early1940s. ...Ironically, the burly actor longed to play leading-man types ..."

== Personal life and death ==
Cregar's height and obesity never went unremarked. He was "several inches taller and a pound or so heavier than Man Mountain Dean" or "an immense Jovian figure ... a massive giant 6 feet 3 inches tall and weighing [in 1942] 310 pounds" (Body mass index 38.74).

Cregar's biographer describes his sexuality as "complicated". Memoirists consistently identify him as a homosexual, recalling him being frank about his homosexuality or meeting him with a "boyfriend". In 1943, David Bacon, a young actor with whom Cregar had been having an affair, was knifed to death, and press accounts of his death carried pictures of Cregar, describing him as "such a good friend" of Bacon. This prompted Darryl Zanuck to arrange for an article in Silver Screen to link Cregar romantically with Dorothy McGuire and to report that, despite his weight, the actor had female fans.

Gossip columnists reported Cregar had a crush at one time or another on Linda Darnell or Dorothy McGuire, or was dating Renie Riano, an older actress, or linked him romantically to Van Johnson. He "more or less steadily dated" Peggy Stack (Marguerite Pamela (née Bolton) Stack Burrowes (1916–2003)), (Note: Stack was sufficiently well known to be named by Hollywood columnists. She was the daughter of Guy Bolton and Marguerite Namara.) for more than two years. Later assessments of Cregar's performances at times identify his sexuality as key to his acting success, as Joel Greenburg wrote of Cregar in The Lodger: "Laird Cregar–plump, soft-spoken, suggesting reserves of violence and rage held barely in check–found in the role of the Ripper an almost therapeutic alleviation of his private angst, the misogyny of a tormented homosexual." Cregar's homosexuality is discussed on features included on a DVD boxed set of The Lodger and Hangover Square.

The crash diet that Cregar followed for his roles in The Lodger and Hangover Square (which included prescribed amphetamines) placed a strain on his system, resulting in severe abdominal problems. He underwent surgery at the beginning of December 1944. (Note: According to TCM host Eddie Muller's January 2023 post-film comments on Hangover Square, the procedure was bariatric surgery. In fact, the first weight-loss surgery was performed in 1954, ten years after Cregar's death.)

A few days after surgery, Cregar had a heart attack and was rushed to the hospital. He rallied briefly when put in an oxygen tent, but died on December 9, aged 31 years. His mother was at his bedside. Hangover Square was released two months after his death. At the time of his death, his next scheduled film was an adaptation of Les Misérables directed by John Brahm, and Billy Rose wanted him to star in a Broadway production of Henry VIII.

The funeral was held on December 13, 1944. Vincent Price, Cregar's co-star in Hudson's Bay (1941), delivered the eulogy. Cregar is interred in Forest Lawn Memorial Park in Glendale, California. His estate was valued at $10,000 ($182,892 today).

== Legacy ==
On February 8, 1960, Cregar received a posthumous star on the Hollywood Walk of Fame at 1716 Vine Street for his contributions to the film industry.

== Early life disinformation ==
Much of what the entertainment press reported about Laird Cregar's early life during his lifetime appears to be invented. His biographer writes that in interviews "he let a few facts mix with fancy". He lied about his age, reducing it by three years. He claimed descent from John Wilkes Booth, though Booth never married and is not known to have fathered a child. He described being sent to England at the age of eight to be educated at Winchester College, where he developed his abilities with British accents. He cited as his first appearances on the stage the role of a page boy with the Stratford-upon-Avon theatrical troupe, as well as other productions at Stratford. Yet Winchester has no record of him and no ship registry records his trans-Atlantic passage. He said he returned home from school in England upon his father's death from cancer, though he was three years old at the time. Cregar's claim to have attended the Episcopal Academy in Philadelphia and graduated when he was 14 is also false.

== Filmography ==
Year	Title	Role	Notes
1940	Oh Johnny, How You Can Love	Sam, Mechanic	uncredited
1940	Granny Get Your Gun	Court Clerk	uncredited
1941	Hudson's Bay	Gooseberry	
1941	Blood and Sand	Natalio Curro	
1941	Charley's Aunt	Sir Francis Chesney	alternative title: Charley's American Aunt
1941	I Wake Up Screaming	Police Insp. Ed Cornell	alternative title: Hot Spot
1942	Joan of Paris	Herr Funk	
1942	Rings on Her Fingers	Warren Worthington	
1942	This Gun for Hire	Willard Gates	
1942	Ten Gentlemen from West Point	Maj. Sam Carter	
1942	The Black Swan	Capt. Sir Henry Morgan	alternative title: Rafael Sabatini's The Black Swan
1943	Hello, Frisco, Hello	Sam Weaver	
1943	Heaven Can Wait	His Excellency (Satan)	
1943	Holy Matrimony	Clive Oxford	
1944	The Lodger	Mr. Slade	
1945	Hangover Square	George Harvey Bone	

== Select theatre credits ==
- Brother Rat – Pasadena Community Playhouse – March 1939
- To Quito and Back by Ben Hecht – Pasadena Community Playhouse – April 1939 – co-starring with Victor Mature
- The Wingless Victory by Maxwell Anderson – Pasadena Community Playhouse – July 1939
- The Great American Family – Pasadena Playhouse – August 1939
- Oscar Wilde by Leslie and Sewell Stokes – El Capitan Theatre, Los Angeles – April 22 – May 19, 1940 – toured San Francisco in June
- The Man Who Came to Dinner – El Capitan Theatre, Los Angeles – September 1941 – revived in Stamford in 1944

== Sources ==
- Mank, Gregory William (2017). Laird Cregar: A Hollywood Tragedy. McFarland & Co Inc. ISBN 978-0786449569.
