= West Pier (disambiguation) =

The West Pier is a pier in Brighton, England.

West Pier may also refer to:

- The West Pier, a novel by Patrick Hamilton and part of the Gorse Trilogy
- West Pier (play), by Bernard-Marie Koltès
