= The Art of Racing in the Rain (film) =

2019 film by Simon Curtis

- Theatrical release poster
- Directed by: Simon Curtis
- Screenplay by: Mark Bomback
- Based on: The Art of Racing in the Rain; 2008 novel by Garth Stein
- Produced by: Patrick Dempsey; Tania Landau; Neal H. Moritz
- Starring: Milo Ventimiglia; Amanda Seyfried; Kathy Baker; Martin Donovan; Gary Cole; Kevin Costner
- Cinematography: Ross Emery
- Edited by: Adam Recht
- Music by: Dustin O'Halloran; Volker Bertelmann
- Production companies: Fox 2000 Pictures; Original Film; Starbucks Entertainment; Shifting Gears Productions
- Distributed by: 20th Century Fox
- Release date: August 9, 2019 (United States)
- Running time: 109 minutes
- Country: United States
- Language: English
- Budget: $18 million
- Box office: $33.8 million

The Art of Racing in the Rain is a 2019 American drama film directed by Simon Curtis and written by Mark Bomback, based on the 2008 novel by author Garth Stein. The film stars Milo Ventimiglia, Amanda Seyfried, Kevin Costner as the voice of Enzo, and Parker as Enzo—a golden retriever dog.

It was theatrically released on August 9, 2019, by 20th Century Fox. The film received mixed reviews from critics and grossed $33.8 million worldwide.

== Plot ==
In Seattle, elderly Golden Retriever Enzo, too weak to move, is carried outside by his owner, professional race car driver Denny Swift. He promises to always to be there for him. Enzo recalls a Mongolian belief that the best dogs reincarnate into men. As he has little time left, he hopes to find Denny again in another life.

Years prior, Denny adopts puppy Enzo after a race. Bonding immediately, he names him after Enzo Ferrari. Denny divides his time between teaching auto racing, auto racing itself, and caring for Enzo. Denny dreams of racing in Formula One, as he struggles to support himself driving for IMSA teams.

A year later, Denny meets Eve. Although Enzo disapproves, they begin dating. Enzo envies their blossoming relationship, until one day Eve tells him she loves Denny, which he accepts. Denny and Eve marry the following year at her parents' mansion. Her mother Trish is supportive, but her father Maxwell disapproves.

Eve soon becomes pregnant. At Christmas, Denny is invited to drive for Team Penske in the 24 Hours of Daytona in late January, shortly before the due date. Eve insists he go, believing it is important for his career. The baby comes early, at home, halfway through the race as Enzo watches Denny on TV.

When Enzo meets their newborn Zoë, Eve tells him to always protect her. A day later, when Denny meets Zoë, he reveals his co-driver crashed in the last laps, but hopes more races will come. Eve's parents visit more frequently, and Maxwell confronts Denny on the dangers of racing, now he is a father. Denny swears always to put safety first, even if he loses every race.

Years pass and Enzo finds family life idyllic, while Denny spends prolonged periods away racing. He is invited to race at Laguna Seca, but is hesitant as he feels his career is stagnating. Enzo is shocked that Denny is considering quitting racing.

Eve falls gravely ill, which Enzo detects through a change in her odour. Diagnosed with brain cancer, she and Zoë move in with Eve's parents during her treatment. As the cancer progresses, Eve tells Enzo she does not fear death. Enzo watches Eve die.

At Eve's funeral, accusing Denny of putting racing before his family, Maxwell demands custody of Zoë and threatens to sue if Denny does not comply. Furious at his insinuation of negligence, Denny attempts to leave. Maxwell grabs him and Denny shoves him away, causing Maxwell to fall and allegedly break a rib.

Reporting the incident to the police, Denny is arrested on a 4th-degree assault charge. If he loses the case, he faces three months incarceration plus permanent loss of custody of Zoë. Continuing racing, Ferrari offers Danny a job in Maranello, testing prototypes. He declines due to his court case, but promises to accept if he wins.

Frustrated, Denny goes jogging in the rain with Enzo, who has slowed in his advanced age and falls behind. Enzo attempts to follow him crossing the street but is hit by a car. Denny rushes him to the vet and drains his savings to pay for the emergency treatment.

Financially and emotionally exhausted, Denny signs an out-of-court settlement, giving up custody of Zoë for visitation and erasing the assault charge. However, Enzo destroys the legal document, inspiring Denny to fight. At the trial, a conflicted Trish admits she did not see Denny assault Maxwell. With the charges dropped, Denny accepts the position with Ferrari. When Maxwell and Trish come to Zoë's ninth birthday party, Denny forgives them both, wanting them in Zoë's life.

Over the next few weeks, Enzo's health rapidly deteriorates. Realizing his best friend is dying, Denny races him around the track for his first and only time. Lamenting he will not be able to accompany his family in Italy, Enzo accepts the good life he has had and looks forward to his new one, hoping to become reincarnated as a human.

Eight years later, Denny, now a successful Formula One driver for Scuderia Ferrari, lives in Italy with Zoë. After a practice session, a young fan with golden hair approaches him for an autograph, introducing himself as Enzo. Denny smiles, saying he reminds him of an old friend, and suggests he return when he is ready to race.

== Cast ==
- Parker as Enzo, a Golden Retriever
  - Kevin Costner as Enzo's voice
- Milo Ventimiglia as Denny
- Amanda Seyfried as Eve
- Kathy Baker as Trish
- Martin Donovan as Maxwell
- Ryan Kiera Armstrong as Zoë
- Gary Cole as Don Kitch
- McKinley Belcher III as Mark Finn
- Andres Joseph as Tony
- Ian Lake as Mike
- Al Sapienza as Luca Pantoni

In addition, in the final scene, Lily Dodsworth-Evans has a brief appearance as a 17-year-old Zoë and former Scuderia Ferrari Formula One driver Giancarlo Fisichella is standing in the Ferrari garage.

== Production ==
In July 2009, Universal Pictures bought the film rights to the prize-winning novel The Art of Racing in the Rain. The project was not able to find a director and came to a halt with Universal Studios. Walt Disney Studios acquired the rights in January 2016. The film adaptation was to be produced by Neal H. Moritz through his Original Film production company.

In 2017, screenwriter Mark Bomback revealed that the project was now set up at 20th Century Fox, saying, "I'm hoping the third time's the charm, and I'm optimistic that next year will be when it finally goes into production."

Principal photography on the film began on May 9, 2018, in Vancouver, British Columbia. The auto racing scenes were filmed at Canadian Tire Motorsport Park in Bowmanville, Ontario, with additional on-track scenes filmed at Laguna Seca Raceway near Monterey, California, Pacific Raceways near Kent, Washington, and Mission Raceway Park, 80 km (50 mi) southeast of Vancouver.

Dustin O'Halloran & Volker Bertelmann teamed up to compose the film score. Fox Music & Hollywood Records has released the soundtrack.

== Release ==
The film was released on August 9, 2019, by Walt Disney Studios Motion Pictures.

=== Home media ===
The Art of Racing in the Rain was released on Digital HD by 20th Century Fox Home Entertainment on October 29, 2019, and on DVD and Blu-ray on November 5, 2019. It was added to Disney+ on September 16, 2022.

== Reception ==
=== Box office ===
The Art of Racing in the Rain grossed $26.3 million in the United States and Canada, and $7.3 million in other territories, for a worldwide total of $33.8 million.

In the United States and Canada, the film was released alongside The Kitchen, Dora and the Lost City of Gold, Scary Stories to Tell in the Dark and Brian Banks, and was projected to gross $6–8 million from 2,700 theaters in its opening weekend. The film made $3 million on its first day, including $450,000 from Thursday night previews. It ended up debuting to $8.1 million, finishing sixth at the box office. It dropped 46% in its second weekend to $4.4 million, finishing in 10th.

=== Critical response ===
On Rotten Tomatoes, the film holds an approval rating of 44% based on 120 reviews, and an average rating of 5.3/10. The site's critical consensus reads: "Its heartstring-tugging overtures may be difficult for dog lovers to resist, but The Art of Racing in the Rain is sentimental and contrived." On Metacritic the film has a weighted average score of 43 out of 100, based on 31 critics, indicating "mixed or average reviews". Audiences polled by CinemaScore gave the film an average grade of "A−" on an A+ to F scale, while those at PostTrak gave it an average 4.5 out of 5 stars and a 72% "definite recommend".

Ed Potton of The Sunday Times gave the film a positive review, observing that the premise "really shouldn't work, yet somehow it steers a course between corniness and barminess. By the end I was crying like a baby, along with many of the other people in my screening, as well as giggling at the preposterousness of it all." Peter Debruge of Variety wrote: "Granted, there aren't a lot of surprises in The Art of Racing in the Rain. If anything, knowing — or at least anticipating — how the film's myriad tragedies will unfold seems to heighten the effect."

Charlotte O'Sullivan of the Evening Standard gave the film 2 out of 5 stars, calling it "strong contender for most ridiculous tearjerker of the year," while Adam Graham of The Detroit News gave the film a "C" on an A to F scale, noting that "this tale of friendship and companionship between man and man's best friend is bogged down in weepy cliches ripped straight from the Art of Making the Audience Cry handbook."
