= Hangover Square (film) =

1945 American horror by John Brahm

- Theatrical release poster
- Directed by: John Brahm
- Screenplay by: Barré Lyndon
- Based on: Hangover Square; 1941 novel by Patrick Hamilton
- Produced by: Robert Bassler
- Starring: Laird Cregar; Linda Darnell; George Sanders
- Cinematography: Joseph LaShelle
- Edited by: Harry Reynolds
- Music by: Bernard Herrmann
- Production company: 20th Century Fox
- Distributed by: 20th Century Fox
- Release date: February 7, 1945 (NYC)
- Running time: 78 minutes
- Country: United States
- Language: English
- Budget: $1,154,400
- Box office: $850,000 $1,798,500 (worldwide)

Hangover Square is a 1945 American horror film directed by John Brahm, based on the 1941 novel Hangover Square by Patrick Hamilton. The screenplay was written by Barré Lyndon, who made a number of changes to the novel, including transforming George Harvey Bone into a classical composer-pianist and filming the story as a turn-of-the-20th-century period piece.

The film, which stars Laird Cregar, Linda Darnell and George Sanders, was released in New York City on February 7, 1945, two months after Cregar suffered a fatal heart attack.

== Plot ==
In Edwardian London in the summer of 1903, a Scottish shop owner in Fulham is stabbed to death and his shop set on fire by distinguished composer George Harvey Bone, who stumbles out onto the street in a stupor. George eventually makes his way back to his basement flat at 12 Hangover Square in Chelsea to find his girlfriend, Barbara Chapman, and her father, Sir Henry Chapman, inside. George admits privately to Barbara that there is "a whole day missing" from his memory. The newspaper has stories of the murder and fire, and George goes to see Dr. Allan Middleton, who works at Scotland Yard. Bone tells Middleton that when he is stressed or overworked he suffers from periods of amnesia brought on by discordant sounds.

On August 29, at a smoking concert at a working-class pub, George meets ambitious and conniving singer Netta Longdon, through his buddy, Mickey. Although Netta, who also lives in the square, is a mediocre talent, George becomes enamored of her. Netta finds George boring, but manipulates him for his composing ability. Meanwhile, Barbara is put off by George's interest in Netta, and Middleton tries to get closer to her. George is driven to another amnesia episode and almost strangles Barbara to death.

George finally kills Netta on Guy Fawkes Night. He carries her wrapped body through streets filled with revelers and deposits it on top of the largest bonfire. Having no memory of the killing, George is able to convince the police that he is innocent, but Middleton remains suspicious. He confronts George on the night of his concerto premiere and insists that he be taken in for his own protection. However, George locks Middleton in the flat and performs the concerto as planned. Middleton's banging is heard by a local workman, and he is freed. Midway through the performance, he enters the music salon with several other policemen, which causes George to remember his crimes. He stops playing and asks Barbara to carry the performance; however, when police question him in a separate room, he attacks them and throws a gas lamp, setting the building on fire. George returns to the salon and resumes playing the piano while the audience and musicians flee, heedless of the fire around him and ignoring Barbara's pleas to escape. As Middleton, Barbara, and Sir Henry look on from outside the burning building, Sir Henry asks why George did not try to get out. Middleton replies, "It's better this way, Sir." The concert hall fills with flame and smoke as George plays the last notes of his concerto.

== Cast ==
- Laird Cregar as George Harvey Bone
- Linda Darnell as Netta Longdon
- George Sanders as Dr. Allan Middleton
- Glenn Langan as Eddie Carstairs
- Faye Marlowe as Barbara Chapman
- Alan Napier as Sir Henry Chapman

Uncredited:

- Michael Dyne as Mickey
- Frederick Worlock as Supt. Clay
- Clifford Brooke as Gas Company Watchman
- Val Stanton as Postman
- Ted Billings as Pub Patron
- Charles Coleman as Man at Bonfire
- Francis Ford as Ogilby
- Eric Wilton as Waiter
- John Goldsworthy as William - Chapman's Butler
- Jimmy Aubrey as Drunk
- J.W. Austin as Detective Inspector King

== Production ==
Laird Cregar, a fan of the original novel, encouraged 20th Century Fox to buy the film rights. Fox agreed, but wanted to recreate the success that it had enjoyed the previous year with The Lodger, and made several changes to the story, including the main character's personality and the setting. Cregar, George Sanders, and John Brahm, who had all worked together in The Lodger, signed on with the project.

Cregar, who had ambitions of being a leading man and was worried that he would always be cast as a villain, refused the role and was put on suspension. Glenn Langan was announced as his replacement. However, Cregar realized that he could use his romantic scenes with Linda Darnell and Faye Marlowe to his advantage in order to change his public image into a more romantic one. He thus accepted the role, but began a radical crash diet to give his character more physical appeal.

The film had to be shot entirely in sequence so as to be consistent with Cregar's real-life weight loss. This frustrated director Brahm, who frequently clashed with Cregar. As a musician, Cregar was eager to perform the musical pieces on his own; however, Brahm insisted that he mime the piano playing. Cregar used amphetamines to aid his rapid weight loss, which led to erratic behavior. Brahm lost patience with Cregar and forced the entire cast and crew to sign a document stating that they were on Brahm's side in order to humiliate Cregar into submission. When filming ended, Cregar told Brahm: "Well, I think we've worked together long enough to know we never want to work together again."

Sanders also brought complications. Having been placed on suspension the previous year for refusing to perform in The Undying Monster, he accepted the role of Dr. Allan Middleton. However, he was unhappy with his script, particularly the final line in the film, which required him to justify the death of George Harvey Bone by saying, "He's better off this way." When shooting the scene, which was very expensive to film, Sanders repeatedly refused to say the line. He was later involved in an altercation with the film's producer Robert Bassler, with Sanders punching Bassler. The line was later changed to "It's better this way."

The American composer Stephen Sondheim has cited Bernard Herrmann's score for Hangover Square as a major influence on his musical Sweeney Todd.

== Reception ==
The film made a profit of $27,700.

The film received mixed reviews. The staff at Variety magazine liked the film and wrote, "Hangover Square is eerie murder melodrama of the London gaslight era—typical of Patrick Hamilton yarns, of which this is another. And it doesn't make any pretense at mystery. The madman-murderer is known from the first reel...Production is grade A, and so is the direction by John Brahm, with particular bows to the music score by Bernard Herrmann." The New York Times said: "There is not a first-class shiver in the whole picture." Film critic and author James Agee reviewed it in 1945: "Hangover Square is a better than average horror picture up to, but not including, its wildly overloaded climax..."

== CD release of Herrmann's music ==
In 2010, British label Chandos released a CD including a 17-minute concert suite from Hangover Square, assembled by Stephen Hogger. The film's musical tour de force is a sonata movement for piano and orchestra in the Lisztian style (in which the scherzo and adagio movements, which are typical as succeeding movements in a concerto, are compressed and presented in place of a central development). On the original film soundtrack the piece was performed off-screen by the pianist Ignace Hilsberg. Slightly revised by the composer in 1973 for Charles Gerhardt's RCA film music series and retitled "Concerto Macabre," it has been recorded by RCA, Naïve, Koch and Naxos, in addition to the recording paired with Hogger's suite. Except for the RCA releases, all of the recordings of the concerto rely on a version edited in 1992 by Christopher Husted. The disc also includes Hogger's extended suite based on Herrmann's incidental music for Citizen Kane (1941).
