= Bitter Harvest (1963 film) =

1963 British film by Peter Graham Scott

- Theatrical poster
- Directed by: Peter Graham Scott
- Written by: Ted Willis
- Based on: 20,000 Streets Under the Sky by Patrick Hamilton
- Produced by: Albert Fennell; Leslie Parkyn (executive); Julian Wintle (executive)
- Starring: Janet Munro; John Stride; Alan Badel
- Cinematography: Ernest Steward
- Edited by: Russell Lloyd
- Music by: Laurie Johnson
- Production company: Independent Artists
- Distributed by: J. Arthur Rank Film Distributors; Continental Distributing
- Release date: 1963
- Running time: 96 minutes
- Country: United Kingdom
- Language: English
- Budget: £200,000 or £250,000

Bitter Harvest is a 1963 British kitchen sink drama film directed by Peter Graham Scott and starring Janet Munro and John Stride. It was written by Ted Willis based on The Siege of Pleasure, the 1932 second volume in the trilogy 20,000 Streets Under the Sky by Patrick Hamilton.

It was the only film where Janet Munro played a lead role.

== Plot ==
Jennie Jones is a beautiful woman who returns intoxicated to her London apartment late one night and begins to destroy its contents in a rage, throwing her purse, keys and expensive gowns out into the street. Her story is then told in flashback.

As a young girl, Jennie lives in an economically depressed, former mining town in Wales, where she works in her father's shabby general store and dreams of a more glamorous life. The store is doing poorly, and Jennie is horrified to discover that her father wants her to move to Cardiff and live with her elderly aunts as a companion and caregiver. While walking through Cardiff, Jennie and her friend Violet meet two well-off older men, Andy and Rex. The men take the girls to a fashionable bar and club for drinks and dancing, and Jennie gets drunk and passes out in Andy's car.

She wakes up naked in bed in the men's apartment in London, having lost her virginity while drunk, and estranged herself from her father by staying out all night. She goes to meet Andy at a London pub, but when he fails to show, she is befriended by the kindly barman, Bob Williams, to the chagrin of the barmaid Ella who is attracted to Bob.

Not wanting to return to her home, Jennie says to Bob that she is pregnant and accepts his offer of help. Bob moves her into his flat and supports them both on his wages, planning to marry her soon. However, Jennie quickly becomes bored, and accepts an invitation from Bob's actor neighbour to attend a party in honour of a well-known producer, Karl Denny. Jennie tells Bob she is attending the party to get work as a model or actress, and convinces him to give her a large sum of money to buy a proper party dress.

Denny notices Jennie at the party and asks her to see him the following night, ostensibly about an acting role. After the party, a drunken Jennie creates a disturbance when she goes home to Bob's apartment. The next night, when Jennie fails to return from her appointment with Denny, Bob goes to Denny's apartment to find her and they argue, with Jennie revealing that she is not pregnant, does not love Bob and does not want to marry him. Heartbroken, Bob leaves and Jennie becomes Denny's mistress.

The flashback ends and the film returns to the scene shown at the start. The morning after Jennie's drunken rampage, she is found dead amidst the wreckage of her apartment (including a smashed framed photograph of Denny), having overdosed on pills. The police find her address book full of men's numbers, suggesting she had been promiscuous. The ambulance carrying Jennie's body almost collides with Bob and Ella, now a happy couple oblivious to Jennie's tragic fate.

== Cast ==
- Janet Munro as Jennie Jones
- John Stride as Bob Williams
- Anne Cunningham as Ella
- Alan Badel as Karl Denny
- Vanda Godsell as Mrs.Pitt
- Terence Alexander as Andy
- Richard Thorp as Rex
- Barbara Ferris as Violet
- Colin Gordon as Charles
- Francis Matthews as Mike
- William Lucas as David Medwin
- Daphne Anderson as Nancy Medwin
- Norman Bird as Mr. Pitt
- Allan Cuthbertson as Mr. Eccles
- Derek Francis as Mr. Jones
- Mary Merrall as Aunt Louise
- May Hallatt as Aunt Sarah
- Nigel Davenport as Police Inspector
- Thora Hird as Mrs Jessup (Uncredited role)
- Jane Hylton as Carole (Uncredited role)

== Production ==
It started filming on 10 September 1962 under the title Everything I Have after originally being known as Twenty Thousand Streets Under the Sky, with Peter Cotes directing. That same month Patrick Hamilton died. Cotes was an experienced theatre and television director who had worked several times with Ted Willis, author of the script for Bitter Harvest. He had also made a feature The Young and the Guilty with star Janet Munro. Male star John Stride had recently been in Romeo and Juliet at the Old Vic.

There was some location filming in Cardiff followed by work at Hampstead Heath. Two weeks into filming Cotes was fired by producer Julian Wintle saying he was dissatisfied with the Hamstead Heath footage. Cotes told Wintle "you cannot do this, it will ruin me in films." He was nonetheless let go, paid his fee of £4,000.

According to Cotes, "It was not a happy experience in the preliminary stages, and as a film was poorly adapted from Hamilton's fine novel. It was eventually made without me." He added, the film "had script trouble and was nearly abandoned before it was scheduled to begin" and "was a bitter experience from every angle."

== Reception ==
According to Peter Cotes "Neither was it, when completed, the most viable film. It was ‘death’ at the box office. In fact, an ‘artistic’ film, faithful to the original story (which is how I set out to direct it before I was stopped), could not have taken less at the box office — and would most likely have made more." Cotes's lawyer in the lawsuit over the film (see below) claims it lost £140,000.

=== Critical ===
Variety said: "Another chance for Janet Munro to destroy her 'Disney image' in a well-made but conventional goodtime-girl drama."

The Guardian said the film "would appear to be a further attempt to Italianize the British film industry. The story certainly seems to owe a lot to Fellini", but praised the acting.

The Radio Times Guide to Films gave the film 3/5 stars, saying that it: "lacks the bite of contemporary examples of social realism, but it's solidly made."

Leslie Halliwell said: "Naive sixties version of the road to ruin, quite well done if you like that kind of thing."

== Lawsuit ==
In 1966 Peter Cotes sued Independent Artists for damages over his sacking, claiming that he had been wrongly fired and his reputation as a feature director had been ruined. The hearing went on for nine days and involved the judge watching the rushes. Julian Wintle was accused of changing the script so that Munro's character died in order to cash in on the deaths of Marilyn Monroe and Pat Marlowe; Wintle denied this, saying it was a change made by the new director. Cotes lost his claim and had to pay costs, estimated at £10,000. The judge, Mr Justice McKenna, ruled that Cotes had not breached a term of his contract, but the producers sincerely believed that his version of the film would fail. The judge added "I cannot imagine a good film being made of this script by Mr Cotes or anybody else. I think Mr Cotes's film would have been more pleasing to the public than the finished film." Cotes declared that he had won a "moral victory".
