= BBC's 100 Most Inspiring Novels =

2019 British list of literary works

On 5 November 2019, the BBC published a list of english novels selected by a panel of six writers and critics, who had been asked to choose 100 English language novels "that have had an impact on their lives". The resulting list of "100 novels that shaped our world", called the "100 Most Inspiring Novels" by BBC News, was published by the BBC to kick off a year of celebrating literature.

The list triggered comments from critics and other news agencies. News agencies from outside the United Kingdom, like Canadian broadcaster CBC News and Nigerian news website Legit.ng, profiled authors with works included in the list who were nationals of their countries. The Guardian noted surprising titles missing from the list, like Moby-Dick (1851), and writing in The Daily Telegraph, Jake Kerridge called it "a short-sighted list that will please nobody."

The BBC relied on six experts: Stig Abell, Mariella Frostrup, Juno Dawson, Kit de Waal, Alexander McCall Smith and Syima Aslam. The CBC characterized the panel as composed of "writers, curators and critics". According to The Guardian, the list commemorated the publication of Robinson Crusoe (1719), 300 years earlier – "widely seen as the progenitor of the English-language novel".

The panel broke their list into ten categories of ten items.

List of BBC's "100 Most Inspiring Novels"
Title	Author	First published	BBC category	Author's nationality
Beloved	Toni Morrison	1987	Identity	American
Days Without End	Sebastian Barry	2016	Identity	Irish
Fugitive Pieces	Anne Michaels	1996	Identity	Canadian
Half of a Yellow Sun	Chimamanda Ngozi Adichie	2006	Identity	Nigerian
Homegoing	Yaa Gyasi	2016	Identity	Ghanaian American
Small Island	Andrea Levy	2004	Identity	British
The Bell Jar	Sylvia Plath	1963	Identity	American
The God of Small Things	Arundhati Roy	1997	Identity	Indian
Things Fall Apart	Chinua Achebe	1958	Identity	Nigerian
White Teeth	Zadie Smith	2000	Identity	British
Bridget Jones's Diary	Helen Fielding	1996	Love, Sex & Romance	British
Forever...	Judy Blume	1975	Love, Sex & Romance	American
Giovanni's Room	James Baldwin	1956	Love, Sex & Romance	American
Pride and Prejudice	Jane Austen	1813	Love, Sex & Romance	British
Riders	Jilly Cooper	1985	Love, Sex & Romance	British
Their Eyes Were Watching God	Zora Neale Hurston	1937	Love, Sex & Romance	American
The Far Pavilions	M. M. Kaye	1978	Love, Sex & Romance	British
The Forty Rules of Love	Elif Shafak	2009	Love, Sex & Romance	Turkish
The Passion	Jeanette Winterson	1987	Love, Sex & Romance	British
The Slaves of Solitude	Patrick Hamilton	1947	Love, Sex & Romance	British
City of Bohane	Kevin Barry	2011	Adventure	Irish
Eye of the Needle	Ken Follett	1978	Adventure	British
For Whom the Bell Tolls	Ernest Hemingway	1940	Adventure	American
His Dark Materials (trilogy)	Philip Pullman	1995	Adventure	British
Ivanhoe	Walter Scott	1819	Adventure	British
Mr Standfast	John Buchan	1919	Adventure	British
The Big Sleep	Raymond Chandler	1939	Adventure	American
The Hunger Games	Suzanne Collins	2008	Adventure	American
The Jack Aubrey Novels (series)	Patrick O’Brian	1969	Adventure	British
The Lord of the Rings	J. R. R. Tolkien	1954	Adventure	British
A Game of Thrones	George R. R. Martin	1996	Life, Death & Other Worlds	American
Astonishing the Gods	Ben Okri	1995	Life, Death & Other Worlds	Nigerian
Dune	Frank Herbert	1966	Life, Death & Other Worlds	American
Frankenstein	Mary Shelley	1818	Life, Death & Other Worlds	British
Gilead	Marilynne Robinson	2004	Life, Death & Other Worlds	American
The Chronicles of Narnia (series)	C. S. Lewis	1950	Life, Death & Other Worlds	British
Discworld (series)	Terry Pratchett	1983	Life, Death & Other Worlds	British
Earthsea (trilogy)	Ursula K. Le Guin	1968	Life, Death & Other Worlds	American
The Sandman	Neil Gaiman	1989	Life, Death & Other Worlds	British
The Road	Cormac McCarthy	2006	Life, Death & Other Worlds	American
A Thousand Splendid Suns	Khaled Hosseini	2007	Politics, Power & Protest	Afghan-American
Brave New World	Aldous Huxley	1932	Politics, Power & Protest	British
Home Fire	Kamila Shamsie	2017	Politics, Power & Protest	British
Lord of the Flies	William Golding	1954	Politics, Power & Protest	British
Noughts & Crosses	Malorie Blackman	2001	Politics, Power & Protest	British
Strumpet City	James Plunkett	1969	Politics, Power & Protest	Irish
The Color Purple	Alice Walker	1982	Politics, Power & Protest	American
To Kill a Mockingbird	Harper Lee	1960	Politics, Power & Protest	American
V for Vendetta	Alan Moore	1982	Politics, Power & Protest	British
Unless	Carol Shields	2002	Politics, Power & Protest	Canadian
A House for Mr Biswas	V. S. Naipaul	1961	Class & Society	Trinidadian
Cannery Row	John Steinbeck	1945	Class & Society	American
Disgrace	J. M. Coetzee	1999	Class & Society	South African
Our Mutual Friend	Charles Dickens	1864	Class & Society	British
Poor Cow	Nell Dunn	1967	Class & Society	British
Saturday Night and Sunday Morning	Alan Sillitoe	1958	Class & Society	British
The Lonely Passion of Judith Hearne	Brian Moore	1955	Class & Society	British Canadian
The Prime of Miss Jean Brodie	Muriel Spark	1961	Class & Society	British
The Remains of the Day	Kazuo Ishiguro	1989	Class & Society	British
Wide Sargasso Sea	Jean Rhys	1966	Class & Society	British
Emily of New Moon	L. M. Montgomery	1923	Coming of Age	Canadian
Golden Child	Claire Adam	2019	Coming of Age	Trinidadian
Oryx and Crake	Margaret Atwood	2003	Coming of Age	Canadian
So Long, See You Tomorrow	William Maxwell	1979	Coming of Age	American
Swami and Friends	R. K. Narayan	1935	Coming of Age	Indian
The Country Girls	Edna O’Brien	1960	Coming of Age	Irish
Harry Potter (series)	J. K. Rowling	1997	Coming of Age	British
The Outsiders	S. E. Hinton	1967	Coming of Age	American
The Secret Diary of Adrian Mole, Aged 13 ¾	Sue Townsend	1982	Coming of Age	British
Twilight (series)	Stephenie Meyer	2005	Coming of Age	American
A Suitable Boy	Vikram Seth	1993	Family & Friendship	Indian
Ballet Shoes	Noel Streatfeild	1935	Family & Friendship	British
Cloudstreet	Tim Winton	1991	Family & Friendship	Australian
Cold Comfort Farm	Stella Gibbons	1932	Family & Friendship	British
I Capture the Castle	Dodie Smith	1948	Family & Friendship	British
Middlemarch	George Eliot	1871	Family & Friendship	British
Tales of the City	Armistead Maupin	1978	Family & Friendship	American
The Shipping News	Annie Proulx	1993	Family & Friendship	American
The Tenant of Wildfell Hall	Anne Brontë	1848	Family & Friendship	British
The Witches	Roald Dahl	1983	Family & Friendship	British
American Tabloid	James Ellroy	1995	Crime & Conflict	American
American War	Omar El Akkad	2017	Crime & Conflict	Egyptian Canadian
Ice Candy Man	Bapsi Sidhwa	1988	Crime & Conflict	British
Rebecca	Daphne du Maurier	1938	Crime & Conflict	British
Regeneration	Pat Barker	1991	Crime & Conflict	British
The Children of Men	P. D. James	1992	Crime & Conflict	British
The Hound of the Baskervilles	Arthur Conan Doyle	1901	Crime & Conflict	British
The Reluctant Fundamentalist	Mohsin Hamid	2007	Crime & Conflict	Pakistani
The Talented Mr. Ripley	Patricia Highsmith	1955	Crime & Conflict	American
The Quiet American	Graham Greene	1955	Crime & Conflict	British
A Confederacy of Dunces	John Kennedy Toole	1980	Rule Breakers	American
Bartleby, the Scrivener	Herman Melville	1853	Rule Breakers	American
Habibi	Craig Thompson	2011	Rule Breakers	American
How to Be Both	Ali Smith	2014	Rule Breakers	British
Orlando	Virginia Woolf	1928	Rule Breakers	British
Nights at the Circus	Angela Carter	1984	Rule Breakers	British
Nineteen Eighty-Four	George Orwell	1949	Rule Breakers	British
Psmith, Journalist	P. G. Wodehouse	1909	Rule Breakers	British
The Moor's Last Sigh	Salman Rushdie	1995	Rule Breakers	British
Zami: A New Spelling of My Name	Audre Lorde	1982	Rule Breakers	American

== See also ==
- Criticism of the BBC
- Classical Literature
- Old English literature
- Medieval Literature
- Renaissance Literature
