= The Charmer (TV series) =

1987 British television series

- Genre: Drama
- Based on: Mr. Stimpson and Mr. Gorse by Patrick Hamilton
- Written by: Allan Prior
- Directed by: Alan Gibson
- Starring: Nigel Havers; Bernard Hepton; Rosemary Leach; Fiona Fullerton
- Theme music composer: Richard Rodney Bennett
- Opening theme: You're the Top – Performed by Paul Jones
- Ending theme: You're the Top – Performed by Paul Jones
- Country of origin: United Kingdom
- Original language: English
- No. of series: 1
- No. of episodes: 6

Production
- Producer: Philip Hinchcliffe
- Running time: 50 minutes
- Production company: LWT

Original release
- Network: ITV
- Release: 18 October – 22 November 1987

The Charmer is a 1987 British television serial set in the 1930s, and starring Nigel Havers as Ralph Ernest Gorse, a seducing conman, Rosemary Leach as Joan Plumleigh-Bruce, a smitten victim widow and Bernard Hepton as Donald Stimpson, Plumleigh-Bruce's would-be beau, who vengefully pursues Gorse after he has conned her.

It was made by London Weekend Television (LWT) for ITV, and loosely based on the 1953 novel Mr. Stimpson and Mr. Gorse by Patrick Hamilton, the second work in the Gorse Trilogy.

The series was repeated in February and March 1990. ITV3 also repeated the series in full at 1:45 a.m. from 5 September 2009. Narrative repeats were on Mondays from 7 September 2009 at 10:05 a.m. It was broadcast in the US on Masterpiece Theater starting 30 April 1989.

== Cast ==
- Nigel Havers as Ralph Ernest Gorse
- Rosemary Leach as Joan Plumleigh-Bruce
- Bernard Hepton as Donald Stimpson
- Fiona Fullerton as Clarice Mannors
- George Baker as Harold Bennett
- Judy Parfitt as Alison Warren
- Abigail McKern as Pamela Bennett
- Gillian Raine as Phyllis Bennett
- Andrew Bicknell as Archie
- Linal Haft as Henry
- Patrick Godfrey as Mr. Norris
- Richard Morgan as Birdwatcher

== Reception ==
Writing for The Los Angeles Times, Ray Loynd wrote "The world loves a delicious scoundrel. "The Charmer," which begins a six-week run on "Masterpiece Theatre" Sunday (8 p.m. on Channels 50 and 24, 9 p.m. on Channels 28 and 15), is a suave romp of a diversion... Havers is so devilishly decadent you root for him not to get caught."

== Episodes ==
No.	Title	Original release date	Length
1	"Gorse, the Tempter"	18 October 1987	51min.
In September 1938, Gorse is down on his luck in Reading when he meets Joan Plumleigh-Bruce, a widow and a snob, and Mr. Stimpson, a real estate broker with designs of his own on Joan.
2	"Gorse, the Investor"	25 October 1987	49min.
Gorse needs money to bankroll his affair with the beautiful Clarice Manners. He steps up his seduction of Joan which arouses the suspicions of Mr Stimpson.
3	"Gorse, the Deceiver"	1 November 1987	49min.
It's April 1939 and Gorse has fled Reading after absconding with Plumleigh-Bruce's money, which he has quickly squandered. He sets his sights on the daughter of his new employer. Mr. Stimpson keeps a watch on him.
4	"Gorse in the Middle"	8 November 1987	49min.
Now married, Gorse feels increasingly trapped. In need of money to escape his domestic life and be with Clarice, he resorts to drastic and dangerous measures.
5	"Gorse, the Imposter"	15 November 1987	49min.
In May 1940, Gorse, now a private, deserts his regiment. He spots his next victim, the recently widowed Alison Warren.
6	"Gorse at the End"	22 November 1987	49min.
With Joan and Mr Stimpson trailing him, Gorse plans a desperate escape with Clarice's help.
