= Oh Johnny, How You Can Love =

1940 film directed by Charles Lamont

- Directed by: Charles Lamont
- Screenplay by: Arthur T. Horman
- Story by: Edwin Rutt
- Produced by: Ken Goldsmith
- Starring: Tom Brown; Peggy Moran
- Cinematography: Milton R. Krasner
- Edited by: Philip Cahn
- Release date: January 1, 1940 (USA)
- Running time: 63 min
- Country: United States
- Language: English
- Budget: $100,000

Oh Johnny, How You Can Love is a 1940 American film directed by Charles Lamont and starring Tom Brown and Peggy Moran. It was an early appearance of Laird Cregar.

The film cost $100,000.

== Plot ==
Kelly Archer, an heiress trying to escape her controlling father and elope with an archeologist, runs into the truck of traveling salesman Johnny Sandham. She hitches a ride with Johnny. A bank robber known as The Weasel commandeers the truck and takes the two hostage. That night, stopping to have the truck's brakes fixed, Johnny dupes the Weasel into helping him win over Kelly: Johnny pretends to be gangster "Jersey Joe", and says they should kidnap Kelly for ransom. Kelly overhears their plan, and helps innkeeper Thistlebottom subdue both men. Kelly's father arrives to take his daughter home, but she rides off with Johnny.
