= Mr. Stimpson and Mr. Gorse =

Novel by Patrick Hamilton

- First edition (publ. Constable)
- Author: Patrick Hamilton
- Language: English
- Genre: Black comedy
- Publisher: Constable (UK)
- Publication date: 1953
- Publication place: United Kingdom
- Media type: Print (Hardback & Paperback)

Mr. Stimpson and Mr. Gorse is a 1953 novel by Patrick Hamilton, the second in the Gorse Trilogy.

The United Kingdom TV drama The Charmer from 1987, is somewhat loosely based on this novel, though the number of changes were sufficient for the dramatist, Allan Prior, to issue a novelisation of the TV series.

== Plot ==
Ernest Ralph Gorse, a suave psychopath and conman, relocates to Reading, Berkshire, to stay at the home of a wealthy friend who is visiting Paris. Gorse meets Joan Plumleigh-Bruce at a pub and decides to target her in a fraud scheme. Mrs. Plumleigh-Bruce, the pretentious widow of an Army Colonel, is contemplating marriage to Donald Stimpson, a local estate agent. Both are charmed by Gorse, who falsely claims to have fought heroically in France during World War I, and who pretends to be the nephew of a renowned Army General.

Stimpson and Gorse arrange to meet at the King's Hotel in London, where Gorse conspires with the bartender to get Stimpson very drunk. Gorse takes Stimpson to visit a prostitute, which gives Gorse "dirt" he can share with Mrs. Plumleigh-Bruce to make Stimpson look bad. Gorse pretends to fall in love with Mrs. Plumleigh-Bruce, and convinces her to open a joint chequeing account for the sake of making some investments and purchasing a car. Gorse dupes Mrs. Plumleigh-Bruce into believing he is buying his friend's house in Reading, as a prelude to marrying her, but runs off with £500.

When Mrs. Plumleigh-Bruce realizes she has been duped, and Gorse has emptied their joint account, she turns to Stimpson for support, only to learn he has married her Irish maid.

Gorse returns to London, while Mrs. Plumleigh-Bruce flees Reading in embarrassment, and relocates to a boarding house on the coast, where she lives out her days.
