= The Slaves of Solitude =

1947 novel by Patrick Hamilton

- First edition (publ. Constable)
- Author: Patrick Hamilton
- Language: English
- Genre: Black comedy
- Publisher: Constable (UK)
- Publication date: 1947
- Publication place: United Kingdom
- Media type: Print (Hardback & Paperback)

The Slaves of Solitude is a novel by Patrick Hamilton. It was published in 1947 and reissued by New York Review Books Classics in 2007. In the United States it was originally published under the title Riverside.

== Plot ==
The novel is set in 1943 in the fictional town of Thames Lockdon (based on Henley-on-Thames), and largely follows the experiences of Miss Roach who lives in the Rosamund Tea Rooms, a guest house, having left London during the Blitz. Also residing at the guest house are Mr Thwaites (described as the 'President in Hell'), Miss Steele, Miss Barrett (both aging spinsters) and Mr Prest (a retired comedian).

Miss Roach works at a publishing firm, 'as a secretary and in other capacities' in London. The opening sequence describes London as a great monster respiring, drawing workers into the city through its lungs in the morning and expelling them in the evening. It then follows Miss Roach to the Rosamund Tea Rooms and she is presented as leading a dull and uncomplicated life. She is, however, oppressed by Mr Thwaites who takes every opportunity to mock her at meal times. Mr Thwaites, revealed to be a Nazi sympathiser, insists that Miss Roach is a 'friend of the Russians', is shown to be overbearing and a bore and forces the shared meals the guests partake in to be conducted in an oppressive atmosphere. Soon after this, two American servicemen appear at dinner. Miss Roach becomes romantically involved with one of them, Lieutenant Pike, beginning a relationship centred on the local pub and kissing on a bench. This relationship becomes disrupted by the arrival of Miss Roach's German friend Vicki Kugelmann, who soon becomes Miss Roach's love rival. Miss Kugelmann moves into the Rosamund Tea Rooms, charms Mr Thwaites and there soon begins a sort emotional struggle between the two spinsters.

== Critical reaction ==
The poet John Betjeman said in a contemporary Daily Herald review, that "I think Mr Hamilton is one of the best living novelists, and that this is the best book he has yet written."

David Lodge described the book as 'one of the best novels about the second world war.'

On 5 November 2019 BBC News included The Slaves of Solitude on its list of the 100 most influential novels.
