= 20,000 Streets Under the Sky =

Series of novels by Patrick Hamilton

- 1935 joint edition with a quote by J. B. Priestley
- 1. The Midnight Bell; 2. The Siege of Pleasure; 3. The Plains of Cement
- Author: Patrick Hamilton
- Country: United Kingdom
- Discipline: Autobiographical novel
- Publisher: Constable Press
- Published: 1929–1934
- Media type: Print
- No. of books: 3
- OCLC: 5723581

20,000 Streets Under the Sky is a trilogy of semi-autobiographical novels by Patrick Hamilton.

The three books are The Midnight Bell (1929), The Siege of Pleasure (1932) and The Plains of Cement (1934). They focus on three of the people who populate The Midnight Bell pub in London; the stories interconnect.

The first book in particular contains autobiographical elements—Hamilton worked in London pubs before becoming a successful writer, was infatuated with a prostitute at that time, and eventually died of liver failure caused by alcoholism. The books are also notable for their portrayal of working class London in the inter-war period.

The trilogy was published in paperback by Vintage in 2004 (ISBN 0-09-947916-8).

== Synopsis ==
The Midnight Bell tells the story of Bob, a sailor turned bar waiter who becomes infatuated with Jenny, a prostitute who visits the pub. Ella, the barmaid at the pub, is secretly in love with Bob. In one of the most autobiographical narratives Hamilton ever wrote, Bob squanders his life savings on Jenny, whose lack of interest in Bob (beyond his money) is painfully evident to all but Bob. Eventually, Jenny loses all interest once Bob has spent all his savings on her.

The Siege of Pleasure is the shortest of the three stories, and recounts a little over twenty-four hours in Jenny's earlier life. She gets a new job as a housemaid to two elderly sisters, but later the same day along with her friend encounters three men in a bar. She elects to stand her erstwhile boyfriend up, gets drunk and is involved in a car accident where there is a possible fatality. The following morning, having spent the night in the home of one of the men, she determines not to go back to the sisters' employ. Bob and Ella do not feature at all in this novel.

The Plains of Cement is set during the events in The Midnight Bell, with Ella as the focus. Ella, still nursing a sublimated affection for Bob, has to deal with the increasingly unwelcome (and not always comprehensible) advances of the lower-middle class Ernest Eccles, an elderly customer of the pub. She is torn between a possible escape from her dull routine and a potential marriage to a man she does not love. We are also introduced to Ella's mother, trapped in a loveless marriage to Ella's violent stepfather. One of the episodes is a replication of that in The Midnight Bell, but told from Ella's perspective. The narrative concludes one day after the final scene of The Midnight Bell.

A common theme across all three stories is Hamilton's use of "narrated monologue or free indirect discourse", wherein a single character's thoughts (in this trilogy Bob, Jenny and Ella respectively) are reproduced directly through the third-person narrator. This is particularly evident in the third section, where Ella is attempting to interpret Eccles' semi-coherent intentions, from trying to work out if a bunch of flowers are for her, to an apparent proposal of marriage.

== Adaptations ==
The 1963 film Bitter Harvest was based on the trilogy.

In November 1989 the novels appeared on BBC Radio Four in three episodes, dramatised by Frederick Bradnum, featuring Steven Pacey, Annette Badland, Emily Morgan and John Moffatt.

In 2005, the books were serialised as Twenty Thousand Streets Under the Sky starring Sally Hawkins, Zoe Tapper and Bryan Dick, and directed by Simon Curtis. It was shown on BBC Four, accompanied by the documentary Words, Whisky and Women. The three-part drama was also released on DVD, HD DVD and Blu-ray.

A new stage adaptation, adapted by Simon Reade and directed by Matthew Iliffe, premiered at London's Southwark Playhouse Borough on 10 September, playing until 17 October 2026.
