= A Sudden Light =

2014 novel by Garth Stein

- First edition
- Author: Garth Stein
- Cover artist: Will Staehle
- Language: English
- Publisher: Simon & Schuster
- Publication date: 2014
- Pages: 416

A Sudden Light is the fourth novel by American author Garth Stein published in 2014 by Simon & Schuster, set in 1990 in Washington State.

== Inspiration ==
The novel is based on Stein's 2005 play Brother Jones which was presented at the Theater of Angels in Los Angeles. Stein initially shelved the play after its first run, but he says that "I really want[ed] to spend some more time with these characters that I'd worked on in the play...The theater is really about the immediacy of the drama as it plays out on a stage in front of us.. But with a novel you're allowed to go into the history of how we got to the 'now' of it and really dig down very deep."

== Plot summary ==
In 1990, 14-year-old Trevor Riddell tried to save his parents marriage following a trial split. He and his father Jones arrive at the family's huge tree mansion overlooking Puget Sound where he meets his seductive aunt Serena and grandpa Samuel suffering from dementia. His father and aunt plan to sell off the house and grounds to divide up the profits and to send Samuel to an assisted living facility. Trevor finds that the house is inhabited by a ghost who wants the family patriarch Elijah to return the house and surrounding forest to its original natural state as a penance for Elijah's exploitation of millions of trees harvested over the years...

== Reception ==
- Kirkus Reviews regards the novel as being preposterous and concludes that "The fatal flaw here is the author’s decision to have a teenager narrate this complex, sprawling story; though a prologue indicates that Trevor is recalling it from adulthood, he stays essentially within his teen perspective, and no matter how precocious he was, he couldn't possibly have had the vantage point to describe the whole situation. To solve that problem, the author supplements Trevor’s knowledge with letters, diaries and ghostly speeches that magically pop up where explication is needed. A repetitive, poorly conceived work of pulp fiction. Frankly, we're stumped."
- Publishers Weekly is more positive: "Stein dramatizes the various tensions between his characters well, although narrator Trevor comes off as a tad precocious for 14. The history of the Riddell family fails to shock after a while, even as events in the present lead to the tragic denouement."
