= The Art of Racing in the Rain =

Book by Garth Stein

- First edition
- Author: Garth Stein
- Language: English
- Genre: Fiction/Adult
- Publisher: HarperCollins
- Publication date: January 1, 2008 (hardcover); June 9, 2009 (paperback)
- Publication place: United States
- Media type: Print: Hardcover; Paperback; Audio: Audio-CD
- Pages: 321 (hardback); 336 (paperback)
- ISBN: 978-0-06-153793-6
- OCLC: 165478930

The Art of Racing in the Rain is a 2008 novel by American author Garth Stein. Narrated from the perspective of the protagonist's dog Enzo, the novel explores philosophy and the human condition through the narrative device of car racing. The novel was a New York Times bestseller for 156 weeks. A film adaptation of the same name directed by Simon Curtis and starring Milo Ventimiglia, Amanda Seyfried, and Kevin Costner as the voice of Enzo, was released in 2019.

== Summary ==
The novel follows the story of Denny Swift, a race car driver and customer representative at a Seattle BMW dealership, and his dog, Enzo, who believes in the legend that a dog "who is prepared" will be reincarnated in his next life as a human. Enzo sets out to prepare, with The Seattle Times calling his journey "a struggle to hone his humanness, to make sense of the good, the bad and the unthinkable."

Enzo spends most of his days watching and learning from television, gleaning what he can about his owner's greatest passion, race car driving—and relating it to life. He watches as Denny marries Eve, the birth of their daughter, Zoe and then Eve's development of brain cancer, which only he can detect through his acute sense of smell. Enzo eventually plays a key role in Denny's child-custody battle with his in-laws and distills his observations of the human condition in the mantra "that which you manifest is before you." Enzo helps Denny throughout his life, through his ups and downs, and gets Zoe back.

== Background ==
Inspiration for the novel came after Stein watched the 1998 Mongolian documentary State of Dogs, and then later in 2004 heard poet Billy Collins give a reading of the poem "The Revenant" told from a dog's point of view.

Stein had originally named the dog "Juan Pablo" after Colombian race car driver Juan Pablo Montoya, but changed his name at the suggestion of his wife, naming the dog instead after Enzo Ferrari, founder of the famous Italian automobile marque of the same name.

The race car driving experience of the novel's character, Denny, is based on Stein's own experience in racing cars, and on another race car driver who is a close friend of Stein's who was dealing with some family turbulence at the time. Stein moved from New York City to Seattle in 2001 and became involved in "high performance driver education," received his racing license with the Sports Car Club of America (SCCA), and won the points championship in the Northwest region Spec Miata class in 2003. Stein left racing after crashing while racing in the rain.

== Film adaptation ==
Universal Pictures acquired the rights to the novel in July 2009, for Patrick Dempsey to star in. The project was unable to find a director.

After the project came to a halt with Universal Studios, Disney acquired the rights in January 2016 with the film adaptation to be produced by Neal Moritz.

In 2017, screenwriter Mark Bomback revealed that the project was now set up at Fox 2000, saying, "I'm hoping the third time's the charm, and I'm optimistic that next year will be when it finally goes into production."

The film was released on August 9, 2019, by 20th Century Fox. It is the first 20th Century Fox film to be marketed on the Walt Disney Studios' official website since the acquisition of the studio by Disney. Milo Ventimiglia and Amanda Seyfried play Denny and Eve, respectively, while Enzo is voiced by Kevin Costner.

== Censorship ==
In 2022, The Art of Racing in the Rain was listed among 52 books banned by the Alpine School District following the implementation of Utah law H.B. 374, “Sensitive Materials In Schools."
