= Hangover Square =

1941 novel by Patrick Hamilton

Hangover Square A Tale of Darkest Earl's Court
- Cover to the 1941 first US edition
- Author: Patrick Hamilton
- Language: English
- Genre: Black comedy
- Publisher: Constable (UK); Random House (US)
- Publication date: 1941
- Publication place: United Kingdom
- Media type: Print (Hardback & Paperback)

Hangover Square is a 1941 novel by English playwright and novelist Patrick Hamilton. It follows the alcoholic George Harvey Bone and his tortured love for Netta Longdon in the months leading up to the Second World War. Subtitled A tale of Darkest Earl's Court, it is set in that area of London in 1939. A black comedy, it is often cited as Hamilton's finest novel, containing the author's concerns about social inequality, the rise of fascism and the impending Second World War.

== Synopsis ==
Set against the backdrop of the days preceding Britain declaring war on Germany, the main character is George Harvey Bone, a lonely, borderline alcoholic who has a form of dissociative identity disorder, referred to in the text as a "dead mood". He is obsessed with gaining the affections of Netta, a failed actress and one of George's circle of drinking acquaintances. Netta is repelled by George but, being greedy and manipulative, she and a common acquaintance, Peter, shamelessly exploit George to get money and drink from him.

During his disordered episodes, he is convinced he must kill Netta for the way she treats him. Upon recovering from these interludes, he cannot remember them; outside these he embarks on several adventures, trying in vain to win Netta's affections, including a would-be romantic trip to Brighton which goes horribly wrong. Netta brings Peter along, and an unknown man with whom she has sex in the hotel room next to George's.

Apart from being a source of money and alcohol, George has another attraction for Netta, his friendship with Johnnie, who works for a theatrical agent. Netta hopes that through him she will get to meet Eddie Carstairs, a powerful figure in the theatre. In a final reversal of fortune it is George, not Netta, who ends up attending a party amongst the theatrical great and good whilst Netta is cast aside by Eddie who (unlike George) has immediately seen her for the unpleasant person she is. George suddenly realises what it is like to be surrounded by people who are interested in him as a person, rather than for what he can provide.

This potentially promising turn of events in George's life is dashed when he suddenly clicks into a dead mood and resumes his murder plans. He murders Netta (and also Peter, whom the narrative describes as a "fascist" moments before the murder) before escaping to Maidenhead. Throughout the novel, Maidenhead represents for George a semi-mythical new beginning, representing a picture of traditional Englishness in contrast to the seaminess of Earl's Court, and the place where he once spent an idyllic holiday with his sister Ellen, now long dead, one of the few people who had loved and understood him. In the closing pages of the novel the fallacy of that dream becomes apparent to George. Now penniless, he gasses himself in a dingy Maidenhead boarding house by turning on the gas fire but not lighting it.

== Autobiographical aspects ==
Hamilton himself struggled with alcoholism. Hamilton located Netta’s flat precisely where a car hit him in 1932, leaving him badly injured and traumatized for many years.

== Reception and adaptations ==
Hangover Square was lauded on its publication. James Agee, writing in the Daily Express, called it "a magnificent thriller". Hamilton's friend Michael Sadleir considered it his best novel. John Betjeman in The Spectator referred to it as being in "the top class of English novels". V.S. Naipaul mentioned it as a book young writers should have read in his Enigma of Arrival. Such was the novel's success that it was rapidly adapted for a film which was released in 1945. Starring Laird Cregar, Linda Darnell and George Sanders, significant changes to the novel were made, most notably the plot's re-location to the Edwardian era.
