= Twenty Thousand Streets Under the Sky =

BBC TV series

- Genre: Drama
- Based on: 20,000 Streets Under the Sky by Patrick Hamilton
- Written by: Kevin Elyot
- Directed by: Simon Curtis
- Starring: Bryan Dick; Sally Hawkins; Zoë Tapper
- Theme music composer: John Lunn
- Country of origin: United Kingdom
- Original language: English
- No. of series: 1
- No. of episodes: 3

Production
- Executive producers: Richard Fell, Gareth Neame
- Producer: Kate Harwood
- Cinematography: John Daly
- Editor: Adam Recht
- Running time: 2 hours, 30 minutes
- Production company: BBC

Original release
- Network: BBC Four
- Release: 19 April – 21 April 2005

Twenty Thousand Streets Under the Sky is a 2005 BBC television serial depicting the intersecting lives of three working-class Londoners in the 1920s. The series is based on the trilogy 20,000 Streets Under the Sky by British author Patrick Hamilton. It stars Sally Hawkins, Zoë Tapper and Bryan Dick. The three-part drama was shown on BBC Four, accompanied by the documentary Words, Whisky and Women, and was also released on DVD, HD DVD and Blu-ray. The series was released in the United States on BBC America on 11 February 2006.

== Cast ==
- Bryan Dick – Bob
- Sally Hawkins – Ella
- Zoë Tapper – Jenny Maple
- Phil Davis – Ernest Eccles
- Susan Wooldridge – Ella's Mother
- Elisabeth Dermot Walsh – Mrs Sanderson-Chantry
- Kellie Shirley – Violet
- Tony Haygarth – The Governor (pub landlord)
- Jacqueline Tong – The Governor's Wife

== Episodes ==
No.	Title	Original release date
1	"The Midnight Bell: Bob's Story"	19 April 2005
Bob, a waiter at a pub called The Midnight Bell, falls in love with Jenny, a prostitute. Ella, a barmaid at the pub, is secretly in love with Bob. He begins to drain his savings in order to entertain Jenny and win her love, even though she repeatedly stands him up.
2	"The Siege of Pleasure: Jenny's Story"	20 April 2005
Jenny begins her working life as a housemaid. An encounter with an unscrupulous upper-class man turns her life towards prostitution.
3	"The Plains of Cement: Ella's Story"	21 April 2005
Taking place at the same time as "The Midnight Bell: Bob’s Story", "The Plains of Cement" is seen from Ella’s perspective. Ella catches the attention of Ernest Eccles, a much older man, who wants to marry her. She loves Bob, but because she finds her love is not returned she wants to change her life.

== Reception ==
The Los Angeles Times called the series "a dreamy but gritty period drama, superbly acted" and "the kind of television at which the BBC repeatedly excels – rich and fulfilling for its understatement, discreet tales that are well told."

Variety praised the series, writing that it "brims with a sense of yearning that takes the very old quandary of not being able to control who one loves and puts an evergreen spin on it. Moreover, the production itself is as meticulous as the storytelling, from the drab palette used in capturing the Depression-era surroundings to the melancholy score."
