= Bryan Dick =

British actor

- Born: 1 February 1978 (age 48); Carlisle, England, United Kingdom
- Education: London Academy of Music and Dramatic Art
- Occupation: Actor
- Years active: 1992–present
- Parent(s): Jim, Jenny

Bryan Dick (born 1 February 1978) is a British television, stage and film actor from Carlisle, England. He is perhaps best known for playing Ernie Wise in the BBC's BAFTA-winning biopic of Morecambe and Wise, Eric and Ernie.

== Career ==
Aged 11, Dick won a scholarship to Elmhurst Ballet School and left home to train as a dancer. Three years later, he was talent-spotted by ITV scouts and cast as the titular anti-hero of 1990s cult classic The Life and Times of Henry Pratt. Since graduating from London Academy of Music and Dramatic Art (LAMDA) in 2000, he has worked on some of the best dramas on British television. In 2015 he was DI Mill in the BBC's Capital, based on the best-selling novel by John Lanchester, and Sir Richard Riche in Wolf Hall.

Early career highlights include White Teeth, based on Zadie Smith's best-selling novel, in which he played Young Archie (old Archie was played by Phil Davis); Blackpool in which he was David Tennant's cheeky sidekick DC Blythe; Simon Curtis's Twenty Thousand Streets Under the Sky, based on the trilogy by Patrick Hamilton, in which he co-starred with Sally Hawkins; and The Long Firm with Mark Strong. Bryan also played Thomas Wyatt in The Virgin Queen, which starred Anne-Marie Duff. He was dance teacher Prince Turveydrop in the multi-award-winning BBC version of Charles Dickens's Bleak House and Freddie Trent in The Old Curiosity Shop.

Other TV work includes the lead with Kris Marshall in the ITV comedy drama series, Sold and Ordeal By Innocence in the Agatha Christie Agatha Christie's Marple with Geraldine McEwan. In 2008 he appeared as Adam in an episode of the same name in the BBC's cult Doctor Who spin-off, Torchwood. He also appeared in the popular television show Shameless and played teacher Ian Bateley in the BBC's critical hit school drama Excluded.

Dick has had several roles on the big screen, notably the role of Joseph Nagle with Russell Crowe in Peter Weir's Master and Commander: The Far Side of the World (2003) and a werewolf in Katja von Garnier's Blood and Chocolate (2007). Other film work includes Brothers of the Head (2005) and Colour Me Kubrick (2006), in which he co-starred with John Malkovich.

On stage he starred at the Hampstead Theatre in Seminar. He has worked with many of the UK theatre's top directors, appearing three times at the Royal Court in Sliding With Suzanne for Max Stafford-Clark, Plasticine, directed by Dominic Cooke, and Bone, by John Donnelly. At the National Theatre he starred as Andrea Sarti in Bertolt Brecht's The Life of Galileo and as Dapper in The Alchemist, both for Nicholas Hytner. He played the title role in Peter Shaffer's Amadeus, again at the Crucible Theatre, with Gerard Murphy as Salieri. Other theatre includes Edward Bond's Lear at the Crucible Theatre, Sheffield and School Play at the Soho Theatre.

In 2016 he played Willie Mossop in Hobson's Choice with Martin Shaw in London's West End.

== Filmography ==
=== Film ===
Year	Title	Role	Notes
2000	Losing It	Tom	TV film
2001	Dream	Bobby	
2002	Morvern Callar	Guy with Hat's Mate	
2003	Master and Commander: The Far Side of the World	Joseph Nagle	
2004	The Bunk Bed Boys	Phil	TV film
2004	Passer By	Ruddock	TV film
2005	Brothers of the Head	Paul Day	
2005	Colour Me Kubrick	Sean	
2007	Blood & Chocolate	Rafe	
2007	The Old Curiosity Shop	Freddie Trent	TV film
2007	I Want You	Boy	Short film
2008	He Kills Coppers	Peter	TV film
2010	Excluded	Ian	TV film
2011	Eric and Ernie	Ernie Wise	TV film
2012	I, Anna	D.C. Peter Hicock	
2012	Day of the Flowers	Conway	
2013	Survival Code	Clive	TV film
2013	The Numbers Station	David	
2016	The Complete Walk: As You Like It	Touchstone	Short film
2017	Joe Orton Laid Bare	Joe Orton	TV film
2018	Shakespeare's Globe: The Two Noble Kinsmen	Arcite	

=== Television ===
Year	Title	Role	Notes
1992	The Life and Times of Henry Pratt	Young Henry Pratt	Mini-series; 2 episodes
1993	Bonjour la Classe	Adam Huntley	Series regular; 6 episodes
1994	Earthfasts	Nellie Jack John	Recurring role, 2 episodes
1994	Stages	Karl	Episode: "Speaking in Tongues"
2000	North Square	Rory McLeish	Episode: "Series 1, Episode 10"
2000	Shockers	Alan Compton	Episode: "Parent's Night"
2001	Clocking Off	Scott Aindow	Episode: "Bev's Story"
2001	The Bill	Tristan King	Episode: "Lick of Paint"
2001	Merseybeat	David Carter	Episode: "Dead Time"
2001	Superintendent Winter	Sonen	Episode: "Dans med en ängel - Del 2"
2002	Strange	Toby	Episode: "Pilot"
2002	Bedtime	PC Jones	Recurring role; 3 episode
2002	Dalziel and Pascoe	Marcus Vanstone	Episode: "Mens Sana"
2002	White Teeth	Young Archie	Mini-series; 2 episodes
2003	Blue Murder	Dean Hendrix	Episode: "Cry Me a River"
2003	Foyle's War	Kenneth Hunter	Episode: "Fifty Ships"
2004	Red Cap	Sergeant Terry Canavan	Episode: "Long Time Dead"
2004	The Long Firm	Beardsley	Episode: "Jimmy's Story"
2004	Blackpool	D.C. Blythe	Series regular; 6 episodes
2005	Twenty Thousand Streets Under the Sky	Bob	Mini-series; 3 episodes
2005	Bleak House	Prince Turveydrop	Recurring role; 6 episodes
2006	Shameless	Jack Wyatt	Episode: "Dark Friends"
2006	The Virgin Queen	Thomas Wyatt the Younger	Mini-series; 1 episode
2006	Vincent	Simon Nelson	Episode: "Series 2, Episode 3"
2007	Agatha Christie's Marple	Micky Argyle	Episode: "Ordeal by Innocence"
2007	Sold	Danny	Series regular; 6 episodes
2008	Torchwood	Adam	Episode: "Adam"
2009	Lewis	Phil Beaumont	Episode: "The Quality of Mercy"
2009	All the Small Things	Jake Barton	Series regular; 6 episodes
2010	Being Human	Sykes	Episode: "Educating Creature"
2010	Ashes to Ashes	Daniel Stafford	Episode: "Series 3, Episode 4"
2011	Haven	Ian Haskell	Episode: "Fear & Loathing"
2013	Silent Witness	Lucas Ballinger	Episode: "Trust"
2013	Death in Paradise	Benjamin Sammy	Episode: "A Deadly Curse"
2013	The Ice Cream Girls	Al Francis	Mini-series; 3 episodes
2015	Wolf Hall	Solicitor General Richard Riche	Recurring role; 3 episodes
2015	Capital	DI Mill	Mini-series; 3 episodes
2018	The Split	Ramsey Sawyer	Episode: "Series 1, Episode 4"
2019	Midsomer Murders	Cyrus Babbage	Episode: "The Sting of Death"

== Theatre credits ==
Year	Title	Role	Venue	Ref
2001	Sliding with Suzanne	Luka	UK Tour	
2002	Plasticine	Lyokha	Jerwood Theatre, London	
2004	Bone	Jamie	Jerwood Theatre, London	
2005	Lear	The Gravedigger's Boy	Sheffield Theatres, Sheffield	
2006	Life of Galileo	Andrea Sarti	Olivier Theatre, London	
2006	The Alchemist	Dapper	Olivier Theatre, London	
2007	Amadeus	Wolfgang Amadeus Mozart	Sheffield Theatres, Sheffield	
2008	Tinderbox	Perchik	Bush Theatre, London	
2013	Public Enemy	Hovstad	UK Tour	
2014	Seminar	Martin	Hampstead Theatre, London	
2016	Hobson's Choice	Willie Mossop	UK Tour	
2017	Years of Sunlight	Emlyn	Theatre503, London	
2018	The Two Noble Kinsmen	Arcite	Shakespeare's Globe, London	
2018	The Art of Success	William Hogarth	Rose Theatre Kingston, Kingston upon Thames	
2018	The Taste of the Town	Samuel	Rose Theatre Kingston, Kingston upon Thames	
2018	Great Apes	Simon Dykes	Arcola Theatre, London	
2021	A Midsummer Night's Dream	Lysander	Shakespeare's Globe, London	
2021	Twelfth Night	Orsino	Shakespeare's Globe, London	
2022	All of Us	Aidan	Royal National Theatre	

== Radio roles ==
- The Exorcist, BBC Radio 4 (2009) - Dyer
- Classic Serial: Barnaby Rudge, BBC Radio 4 (2014) - Simon Tappertit
- The Great Gatsby, BBC Radio 4 (2012) - Nick Carraway
- Saturday Play: On the Ceiling, BBC Radio 4 (2009) - Loti
- Shattered, BBC Radio 4 (2008) - Tyler
- Ruth Rendell's The Fever Tree: The Dreadful Day of Judgement, BBC Radio 4 (2006) - Gilly
- Classic Serial: Kipps - the Story of a Simple Soul, BBC Radio 4 (2006) - Arthur Kipps
- The Wire: The Colony, BBC Radio 3 (2005) - Vinnie
- 15 Minute Drama: CJ Sansom - Shardlake: Sovereign BBC Radio 4 (2015)
- Drama on 4: A Broken Order - Vic Siffer BBC Radio 4 (2026)
- Celtic Christie: The Unexpected Guest BBC Radio 4 (2026) - Michael
