= State of Dogs =

State of Dogs Nohoin Oron
- Directed by: Peter Brosens; Dorjkhandyn Turmunkh
- Written by: Peter Brosens; Dorjkhandyn Turmunkh
- Produced by: Peter Brosens (Inti Films); Jan Ewout Ruiter (Balthazar Film); Kristiina Pervila; Alok Nandi I
- Starring: Nyam Dagyrantz; Baatar Galsansukh; Purevdavaa Oyungerel; Jamyansuren Oyunstingel
- Narrated by: Maria von Heland
- Cinematography: Heiki Färm; Sakhya Byamba
- Music by: Charo Calvo
- Release date: December 7, 1998
- Running time: 91 minutes
- Country: Mongolia
- Language: Mongolian

State of Dogs (Mongolian: Нохойн орон, alternately Nokhoin Oron) is a Mongolian movie that was released in 1998, directed and written by Peter Brosens and Dorjkhandyn Turmunkh. The film was shown at the 1998 Venice Film Festival, the 1998 Toronto International Film Festival, the 1999 Yamagata International Documentary Film Festival, and won the Grand Prix at the 1998 Visions du Réel film festival in Nyon, Switzerland.

== Synopsis ==
Set in Mongolia's capital city, Ulaanbaatar, the film combines documentary elements with fictional elements in the fragmented, impressionistic and dreamlike story of Baasar, a dog who dies early in the movie — shot by a hunter employed by the city to reduce its dog population, which has more than one dog for each four humans in its population of 800,000.

According to Mongolian legend, a dog (who is prepared) may be reincarnated in its next life as a human, after roaming free for as long as he wants. Baasar roams the memory of his life, uninterested in advancing to a human life.

The film includes brief interludes with a solar eclipse, a segment in which a young man recites poems directly to the camera, and a depiction of modern Mongolian life with undercurrents of mysticism and myth.

== Cultural influence ==
Garth Stein, American author and film producer, was inspired by State of Dogs to write his best selling novel The Art of Racing in the Rain.

== Awards ==
- "Grand Prix", Visions du Réel, Nyon
- "Grand Prix", Graz Biennale für Medien und Architektur
- "Grand Prix", Maremma Doc Festival, in Tuscany
- "Grand Prix" & "Special Jury Award", SEIA, Portugal
- "Critics Award", São Paulo International Film Festival
- "Best Documentary", Molodist International Film Festival, Kyiv
- "FICC Prize", Molodist International Film Festival, Kyiv
- "Don Quixote Award," Molodist International Film Festival
- "Best Film Award", Molodist International Film Festival
- "Best Feature Film Award", Gavà International Environmental Film Festival
- "Best Script Award", Györ MediaWave International Festival of Visual Arts, Hungary
- "Special Jury Award", St. Petersburg Message to Man Film Festival
- “Critics Award,” Bodrum Environmental International Film Festival
- “Mention Spéciale du Jury” Strasbourg Semaine du Documentaire de Création Européen
- “European Lianas for Best Documentary” New European Talent 98, Barcelona
- “Silver Award” World Festival of Human and Nature Films, Korea
- “Fonske” KFL (Katholieke Filmliga)
