= Rings on Her Fingers =

1942 film by Rouben Mamoulian

- Theatrical poster
- Directed by: Rouben Mamoulian
- Screenplay by: Ken Englund; Emeric Pressburger (adaptation) (uncredited)
- Story by: Robert Pirosh; Joseph Schrank
- Produced by: Milton Sperling
- Starring: Henry Fonda; Gene Tierney; Laird Cregar; Spring Byington
- Cinematography: George Barnes
- Edited by: Barbara McLean
- Music by: Cyril J. Mockridge; Leigh Harline
- Distributed by: 20th Century Fox
- Release date: March 20, 1942
- Running time: 86 minutes
- Country: United States
- Language: English
- Budget: $651,000
- Box office: $925,300

Rings on Her Fingers is a 1942 American comedy film directed by Rouben Mamoulian for 20th Century Studios and starring Henry Fonda and Gene Tierney.

The film is reminiscent of the 1930s screwball comedies starring Carole Lombard and Jean Arthur, and in particular Paramount's The Lady Eve (1941), also featuring Henry Fonda.

== Plot ==
Susan Miller works as a girdle salesgirl in a large department store. She dreams of living on "the other side", among the rich. An elderly woman, calling herself Mrs. Maybelle Worthington, comes to buy some underwear. She is actually a professional swindler. Her partner Warren meets her at the department store, and reports that her "daughter" (a partner in their schemes) has run away to get married. They notice that Susan resembles the "daughter", and ask her to impersonate the missing girl at their party that evening. Susan sees an opportunity to experience life among the rich, and wear the expensive clothes she could never afford.

From that day on, Susan becomes "Linda Worthington" and accompanies "Mother Worthington" and "Uncle Warren" in their travels. They use her to attract marriageable young rich men, whom they swindle. One day in Southern California, they encounter John Wheeler, and overhear his plan to buy a yacht for $15,000. They take him for a millionaire, and use "Linda" to lure him into one of their swindles. But John is actually an accountant, who has carefully saved the $15,000 out of his limited income. This time Susan/Linda falls in love with the intended victim, and it is hard for them to find their way to happiness.

== Cast ==
- Henry Fonda as John Wheeler
- Gene Tierney as Susan Miller / "Linda Worthington"
- Laird Cregar as Warren
- Spring Byington as Mrs. Maybelle Worthington
- Shepperd Strudwick as Tod Fenwick (as John Shepperd)
- Frank Orth as Kellogg
- Henry Stephenson as Colonel Prentiss
- Marjorie Gateson as Mrs. Fenwick
- George Lessey as Fenwick Sr.
- Iris Adrian as Peggy
- Harry Hayden as Conductor
- Clara Blandick as Mrs. Beasley
- Charles C. Wilson as Captain Hurley
- Gwendolyn Logan as Miss Calahan

== Reception ==
The film recorded a loss of $14,100.

== Retrospective appraisal ==
Producer Darryl Zanuck informed Mamoulian in writing that he expected the director to create a film that had the look of a high-production "A picture", but rendered on a "B-picture" budget. According to biographer Kurt Jensen, Mamoulian considered it "the least important of my films" and lacking the stylistic elements characteristic of his oeuvre.

Critic Tom Milne concurs, calling the film "a lightweight comedy [and] the only film he ever made in which one could not instantly recognize his hand". Praising Henry Fonda's performance as "brilliant throughout", he notes that "the film is of only marginal interest in Mamoulian’s work".

Film historian Marc Spergel emphatically denies that the film deviates significantly from Mamoulian's other pictures:

The claim that the film is unrepresentative of his body of work is false. While it may not be recognizable Mamoulian at first glance, it is congruent with his body of work…the sexual titillation, wit, sophistication, and fast-pacing in the film are all characteristically Mamoulian.

Spergal adds, "Mamoulian was fortunate in having a true ensemble of accomplished actors who were able to bring their abilities to the film," among these, Fonda, Tierney, Byington and Cregar.

Movie censors were primarily troubled by Mamoulian's failure to depict licentious behavior as deserving of punishment. Gene Tierney's bathing suit scenes and her conduct were deemed offensive because it appears that she is soliciting sex. The names "Betty, Irene and Mabel" were changed "because these were slang terms for contraceptives at the time".
