= Gorse Trilogy =

Three novels by Patrick Hamilton (1904-1962)

The Gorse Trilogy is a series of three novels, the last published works of the English author Patrick Hamilton. It consists of:

- The West Pier (1951)
- Mr. Stimpson and Mr. Gorse (1953)
- Unknown Assailant (1955)

Each volume represents an episode in the career of the anti-hero Ernest Ralph Gorse, a skilled professional confidence man, whose heartlessness and lack of scruple are matched only by the inventiveness and panache with which he swindles his victims. Hamilton is thought to have been based him on the real-life con-man and murderer Neville George Heath, who was executed in 1946.

Gorse insinuates himself into the lives of his victims with his good looks and easy confidence, and always with a good story. His victims are always women, and he flatters his way into their affections until he is in a position to turn things to his advantage. Graham Greene called The West Pier "the best book written about Brighton", while L.P. Hartley said, "The entertainment value of this brilliantly told story could hardly be higher." Writing for The Independent, critic D. J. Taylor called Unknown Assailant "an inferior work" while The Guardian called it "drink-soaked."

A loose adaptation of Mr Stimpson and Mr Gorse was produced by ITV in 1987, under the title The Charmer. The changes were sufficient for the dramatist, Allan Prior, to issue a separate novelisation of the TV series.

Gorse has a cameo as a secondary villain in Kim Newman's 2013 novel Johnny Alucard, par of his Anno Dracula series.
