= Garth Stein =

American writer

- Born: December 6, 1964 (age 61); Los Angeles, California, U.S.
- Education: Columbia University (BA, MFA)
- Occupation: Writer
- Spouse: Andrea Stein
- Children: Caleb; Eamon; Dashiell
- Writing career
- Notable works: The Art of Racing in the Rain, How Evan Broke His Head and Other Secrets
- Notable awards: Two PNBA Book Awards
- Website: www.garthstein.com

Garth Stein (born December 6, 1964) is an American author and film producer from Seattle, Washington. Widely known as the author of the novel The Art of Racing in the Rain, Stein is also a documentary film maker, playwright, teacher, and amateur racer.

== Early life and education ==
Garth Stein was born in Los Angeles on December 6, 1964, but spent most of his childhood growing up in Seattle. His father, a Brooklyn native, was the child of Austrian Jewish immigrants, while Stein's Alaskan mother comes from Tlingit and Irish descent. Stein later revisited his Tlingit heritage in his first novel, Raven Stole the Moon.

Stein earned a B.A. from Columbia College of Columbia University (1987), where he was a member of the Philolexian Society, and a Master of Fine Arts degree in film from the university's School of the Arts (1990).

== Career ==
Stein has worked as a director, producer and/or writer of documentary films, several of which won awards. In 1991, he co-produced an Academy Award winning short film, The Lunch Date. He then co-produced The Last Party, a film commentating on the 1992 Democratic National Convention. Stein also produced and directed a documentary about his sister's brain surgery, entitled When Your Head's Not a Head, It's a Nut.

After films, Stein took up creative writing. At one time, he taught creative writing at Tacoma School of the Arts. His published works include three books and two plays. Brother Jones, his first play, was produced in Los Angeles, California in 2005. Garth wrote another play (No One Calls Me Mutt Anymore, 2010) for the theatrical department at his alma mater, Shorewood High School in Shoreline, WA.

Stein's third novel, The Art of Racing in the Rain (Harper, 2008) became a New York Times bestseller, a No. 1 BookSense Pick., and winner of a 2009 Pacific Northwest Booksellers Association Award.

The novel follows the story of Enzo, a race car-obsessed dog who believes he will be reincarnated as a human. While his owner, race car driver Denny Swift, teaches him about the art of racing, most of Enzo's ideas and knowledge— including the Mongolian legend that a dog who is prepared will be reincarnated in its next life as a human— come from watching television.

Stein was inspired to write the book after viewing a documentary on Mongolia called State of Dogs and after hearing a reading of the Billy Collins poem "The Revenant," told from a dog's point of view.

The racing experience and insights of the novel's protagonist, Enzo, and his owner Denny are based on Stein's own experience racing cars. Stein moved from New York City to Seattle in 2001 and became involved in "high performance driver education," received his racing license with the Sports Car Club of America (SCCA), won the points championship in the Northwest Region Spec Miata class in 2004, and left racing after a serious crash — while racing in the rain.

== Personal life ==
Stein was born in Los Angeles, grew up in Seattle, and after spending 18 years in New York City, returned to Seattle where he lives with his wife, Andrea Perlbinder Stein, sons Caleb, Eamon and Dashiell — and the family dog, Comet, a lab/poodle mix. While living in New York, Stein played bass in Zero Band, a rock band that rehearsed but rarely performed.

== Bibliography ==
=== Films ===
- Lunch Date (1991)
- The Last Party (1992)
- When Your Head's Not a Head, It's a Nut (1993)--A documentary following Garth's sister and family, as she seeks treatment for her epilepsy through surgery.

=== Plays ===
- Brother Jones (2005)
- No One Calls Me Mutt Anymore (2010)

=== Novels ===
- Raven Stole the Moon (Atria Books, 1998)
- How Evan Broke His Head and Other Secrets (Soho Press, 2005) – Winner of a 2006 PNBA Award.
- The Art of Racing in the Rain (HarperCollins, 2008) – A New York Times bestseller and winner of a 2009 PNBA Award
- A Sudden Light (Simon & Schuster, 2014)

=== Children's Novels ===
- Racing in the Rain: My Life as a Dog (HarperCollins, 2011) – A middle-grade/young adult version of The Art of Racing in the Rain.

=== Graphic Novels ===
- The Cloven: Book One (Fantagraphics, 2020) – Illustrated by Matthew Southworth.
- The Cloven: Book Two (Fantagraphics, 2023)

=== Co-Authored Novel ===
- Hotel Angeline: A Novel in 36 Voices (2011) – Written by 36 authors in a week-long, marathon fundraiser for literacy projects in Seattle, WA.

=== Co-Produced Short Films ===
- The Lunch Date (1990) – Written by Adam Davidson, a short film produced to show the appearance and reality between the relationship of blacks and white.
