= Patrick Hamilton (writer) =

English playwright and novelist (1904–1962)

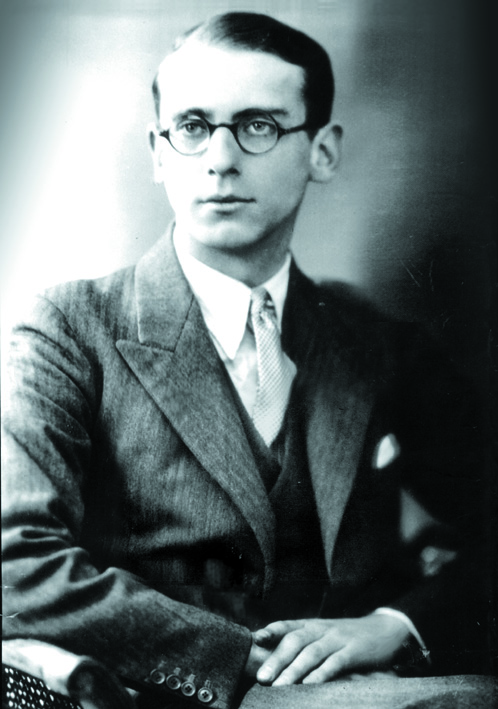
- Born: Anthony Walter Patrick Hamilton; 17 March 1904; Hassocks, Sussex, England
- Died: 23 September 1962 (aged 58); Sheringham, Norfolk, England
- Occupations: Playwright, novelist
- Relatives: Bruce Hamilton (brother)
- Writing career
- Notable works: Rope, Gas Light, Hangover Square

Anthony Walter Patrick Hamilton (17 March 1904 – 23 September 1962) was an English playwright and novelist. He was well regarded by Graham Greene and J. B. Priestley, and study of his novels has been revived because of their distinctive style, deploying a Dickensian narrative voice to convey aspects of interwar London street culture. They display a strong sympathy for the poor, as well as an acerbic black humour. Doris Lessing wrote in The Times in 1968: "Hamilton was a marvellous novelist who's grossly neglected".

His two most successful plays, Rope (1929) and Gas Light (1938), were made into famous films: Alfred Hitchcock's Rope (1948); the UK-made Gaslight (1940), followed by the 1944 American version.

== Life and works ==
Hamilton was born on 17 March 1904, at Dale House, in the Sussex village of Hassocks, near Brighton, to (Walter) Bernard Hamilton (1863–1930), a writer and non-practising barrister, and his second wife, Ellen Adèle (née Hockley; 1861–1934), who wrote as "Olivia Roy". His parents were pretentious and snobbish; Bernard Hamilton thought himself to be "a great writer although the few books he penned — soppy romances and some hotchpotch of religion and spirituality — were mediocre at best", "frequently boasted about his genealogical table", and "pretended to be the rightful heir to the throne of Scotland", and Ellen "treated her domestics with haughtiness" and "attempted to breed her children as members of the high society". Due to his father's alcoholism and financial ineptitude, the family spent much of Hamilton's childhood living in boarding houses in Chiswick and Hove. His education was patchy, and ended just after his fifteenth birthday when his mother withdrew him from Westminster School. His first published work was a poem, "Heaven", in the Poetry Review in 1919. His sister Lalla, acted under the name of Diana Hamilton and starred in Sutton Vane's Outward Bound.

After a brief career as an actor, he became a novelist in his early twenties with the publication of Monday Morning (1925), written when he was nineteen. Craven House (1926) and Twopence Coloured (1928) followed, but his first real success was the play Rope (1929, known as Rope's End in America).

The Midnight Bell (1929) is based upon Hamilton's falling in love with a prostitute and was later published along with The Siege of Pleasure (1932) and The Plains of Cement (1934) as the semi-autobiographical trilogy Twenty Thousand Streets Under the Sky (1935).

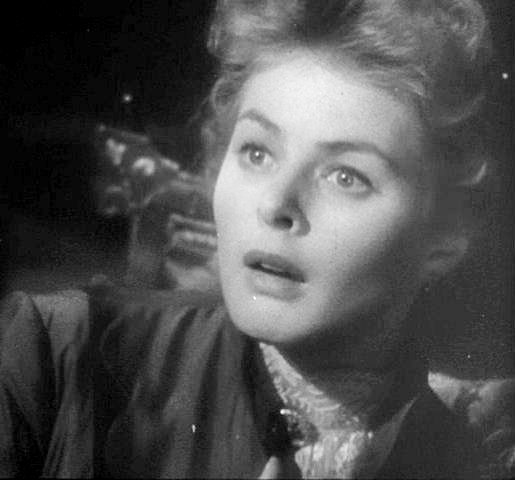
Ingrid Bergman in the 1944 American film version Gaslight

Hamilton disliked many aspects of modern life. He was disfigured badly when he was run over by a car in the late 1920s: the end of his novel Mr. Stimpson and Mr. Gorse (1953), with its vision of England smothered in metal beetles, reflects his loathing of the motor car. Despite some distaste for the culture in which he operated, however, he was a popular contributor to it. His two most successful plays, Rope and Gas Light (1938, known as Angel Street in the US), made Hamilton wealthy and were also successful as films: the British-made Gaslight (1940), the 1944 American adaptation of Gaslight, and Alfred Hitchcock's Rope (1948).

Hangover Square (1941) is often judged his most accomplished work and still sells well in paperback, and is regarded by contemporary authors such as Iain Sinclair and Peter Ackroyd as an important part of the tradition of London novels. Set in Earls Court where Hamilton himself lived, it deals with both alcohol-drinking practices of the time and the underlying political context, such as the rise of fascism and responses to it. Hamilton became an avowed Marxist, though not a publicly declared member of the Communist Party. During the 1930s, like many other authors, Hamilton grew increasingly angry with capitalism and believed that the violence and fascism of Europe during the period indicated that capitalism was reaching its end. This encouraged his Marxism and his novel Impromptu in Moribundia (1939) was a satirical attack on capitalist culture.

During his later life, Hamilton's writing developed a misanthropic authorial voice, which became more disillusioned, cynical and bleak as time passed. The Slaves of Solitude (1947) was his only work to deal directly with the Second World War and he preferred to look back to the pre-war years. His Gorse Trilogy – three novels about a devious sexual predator and conman – are not generally well thought of critically, although Graham Greene said that the first was 'the best book written about Brighton' and the second (Mr. Stimpson and Mr. Gorse) is regarded increasingly as a comic masterpiece. The hostile and negative tone of the novels is also attributed to Hamilton's depression and disenchantment with the utopianism of Marxism. The trilogy comprises: The West Pier (1952); Mr. Stimpson and Mr. Gorse (1953), dramatized as The Charmer in 1987; and in 1955 Hamilton's last published work, Unknown Assailant, a short novel much of which was dictated while Hamilton was drunk. The Gorse Trilogy was first published in a single volume in 1992.

Hamilton had begun to consume alcohol excessively while still a relatively young man. After a declining career and melancholia, he died in 1962 of cirrhosis of the liver and kidney failure, in Sheringham, Norfolk. He was married twice, firstly to Lois Marie Martin in 1930, and a year after divorcing Lois, to Lady Ursula Chetwynd-Talbot (a novelist who wrote under the pseudonym Laura Talbot) in 1954.

A collection of Hamilton's manuscripts and correspondence can be found at the Harry Ransom Center at the University of Texas at Austin.

== Bibliography ==
=== Novels ===
- Monday Morning (1925)
- Craven House (1926, revised edition 1943)
- Twopence Coloured (1928)
- The Midnight Bell (1929)
- The Siege of Pleasure (1932)
- The Plains of Cement (1934)
- Twenty Thousand Streets Under the Sky (1935 – trilogy of The Midnight Bell, The Siege of Pleasure and The Plains of Cement)
- Impromptu in Moribundia (1939)
- Hangover Square (1941)
- The Slaves of Solitude (1947)
- The West Pier (1951)
- Mr. Stimpson and Mr. Gorse (1953)
- Unknown Assailant (1955)

== Stage plays ==
- Rope (1929)
- The Procurator of Judea (1930; unpublished)
- John Brown's Body (1931; unpublished)
- Gas Light (1938), also known as Angel Street
- The Duke in Darkness (1943)
- The Governess (1946; unpublished)
- Caller Anonymous (1952; unpublished)
- The Man Upstairs (1953)
- Miss Roach (1958; unpublished)
- Hangover Square (1965; unpublished)

== Radio plays ==
- Rope. BBC National Programme, 18 January 1932. Adapted from the stage play qv
- Conversation in a Train. BBC Regional Programme. 2 June 1936
- Money with Menaces. BBC National Programme, 4 January 1937
- To the Public Danger. BBC National Programme, 25 February 1939
- Gas Light. BBC Home Service, 24 November 1939. Adapted from the play qv
- This is Impossible. BBC Home Service, 27 December 1941
- The Duke in Darkness. 17 April 1944. Adapted from the stage play qv
- The Governess. BBC Home Service, 1 November 1948. Adapted from the stage play qv
- Caller Anonymous. BBC Home Service, 7 March 1952
- 20,000 Streets Under the Sky. BBC Radio 4, 17 Nov 1989

== Recent revival ==
Hamilton was the subject of a special season of films in March 2005 at the National Film Theatre in London, and continuing the strong revival of interest in his work the British TV channel BBC Two screened an adaptation of 20,000 Streets Under the Sky in September 2005, reshown on BBC Four in January 2006, alongside a documentary account of his life. The adaptation was released on DVD in 2007. A one-man show about Hamilton's life appeared in the Edinburgh Festival in 2014 and the Brighton Fringe Festival in 2015 and in London, written and performed by Mark Farrelly and called The Silence of Snow: the Life of Patrick Hamilton.
