= A Proud Family Wizmas =

- Promotional poster
- Directed by: Bruce W. Smith
- Written by: Ralph Farquhar
- Based on: The Proud Family: Louder and Prouder by Bruce W. Smith
- Music by: Kurt Farquhar
- Production companies: Disney Television Animation; BaR Productions; HouseSpecial
- Distributed by: Disney+
- Release date: November 14, 2026
- Country: United States
- Language: English

A Proud Family Wizmas is an American animated holiday special based on and serving as the series finale of the American animated sitcom The Proud Family: Louder and Prouder, with the voice cast reprising their roles alongside numerous guest appearances. It premiered on Disney+ on November 14, 2026.

== Plot ==
When Penny Proud inadvertently ruins Christmas, she begrudgingly agrees to fix it and save Christmas for the children of Emilyville and the world.

== Production ==
=== Development ===
A Proud Family Wizmas was announced in June 2026. It is directed by creator and executive producer Bruce W. Smith alongside co-director David Brooks and was written by executive producer Ralph Farquhar.

=== Casting ===
A Proud Family Wizmas features returning cast members Kyla Pratt as Penny Proud, Tommy Davidson as Oscar Proud, Paula Jai Parker as Trudy Proud, Jo Marie Payton as Suga Mama, Cedric the Entertainer as Bobby Proud, Karen Malina White as Dijonay Jones, Soleil Moon Frye as Zoey Howzer, Alisa Reyes as LaCienega Boulevardez, Carlos Mencia as Felix Boulevardez, Alvaro Gutierrez as Papi, Raquel Lee as Nubia Gross, and Melissa De Sousa as Sunset Boulevardez. The special also features guest stars Anderson .Paak as Mall Elf, Lil Rel Howery as Bubble, J. B. Smoove as Mall Santa, Karlous Miller as Benny, Tone Loc returning as Penny Loc, Earthquake as Big Mack, Luenell as Belinda, Affion Crockett as Billy, and Gabrielle Union returning as Talia Rogue.

=== Animation ===
A Proud Family Wizmas features stop motion animation produced by Disney Television Animation and stop motion studio HouseSpecial.

== Release ==
On October 13, 2026, A Proud Family Wizmas was announced to release on November 14. Its trailer was released on November 4.

== Reception ==
A Proud Family Wizmas has received generally positive critical reviews. Common Sense Media's Joyce Slaton awarded the special a four out of five stars, calling it a "gratifying watch that should leave everyone in the family feeling warm inside". Laughing Place's Tony Betti praised A Proud Family Wizmas for its charming stop-motion animation, catchy musical numbers, humor, and holiday spirit, although it criticized the story for relying heavily on familiar Christmas movie plots, ultimately awarding it three out of five. Bubbleblabber's Marcus Gibson praised A Proud Family Wizmas for its humor, heartfelt charm, enjoyable stop-motion animation, and nostalgic holiday atmosphere, although he criticized its predictable storyline and lack of originality, ultimately awarding it a 7/10 rating.

== Soundtrack ==
The soundtrack for A Proud Family Wizmas was released on November 13, 2026, a day prior to its premiere, and features ten tracks. Series composer Kurt Farquhar served as the songwriter and composer.

No.	Title	Length
1.	"Wizmas Day"
2.	"Wizmas Christmas"
3.	"Santa Clause Never Goes to the Hood"
4.	"I Am, That I Am Suga Mama"
5.	"The Way of the Sleigh"
6.	"Have Yourself a Merry Wizmas"
7.	"Cause It's Christmas"
8.	"The Proud Family Theme (Christmas Version)"
9.	"As Long As You Keep Believing"
10.	"Giddy Up"
