= Karen Malina White =

American actress (born 1965)

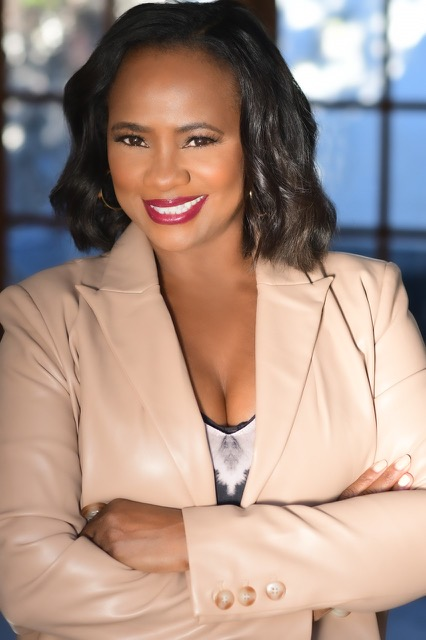
- White in 2006
- Born: Philadelphia, Pennsylvania, U.S.
- Education: Howard University (BFA)
- Occupation: Actress
- Years active: 1980–present
- Known for: Kaneesha Carter on Lean on Me; Charmaine Brown on The Cosby Show and A Different World; Dijonay Jones on The Proud Family and The Proud Family: Louder and Prouder
- Website: karenmalinawhite.com

Karen Malina White is an American film and television actress. She is best known for her roles as Kaneesha Carter in the 1989 drama film Lean on Me, Charmaine Brown during the two final seasons on The Cosby Show (1990–1992) and its spin-off A Different World (1992–1993), Nicolette Vandross on Malcolm & Eddie (1996–2000), and as the voice of Dijonay Jones on the Disney Channel animated comedy The Proud Family (2001–2005) and its 2022 Disney+ reboot The Proud Family: Louder and Prouder.

== Biography ==
Born and raised in Philadelphia, Pennsylvania, White studied at the Philadelphia High School for Creative and Performing Arts. After graduating high school, White continued her studies at Howard University, where she graduated cum laude with a Bachelor of Fine Arts Degree. During her senior year, White won the title of "Miss Howard University" and landed her first role as an actress.

== Career ==
In 1989, White starred in Lean on Me alongside actor Morgan Freeman, which White considers her first major role. She was nominated for the 1990 Young Artist Award for Best Young Actress Supporting Role in a Motion Picture for her performance in the film. During the 1990s, White made many guest appearances in various television shows. White portrayed Charmaine Brown during Seasons 7 and 8 of The Cosby Show (1990–1992), and Season 6 of A Different World (1992–1993). White also guest starred as Jewel, Jazz's wife, in two episodes of The Fresh Prince of Bel-Air. White portrayed series regular Nicolette Vandross on Malcom & Eddie. White appeared in recurring guest star roles on Animal Kingdom, Bruh, Better Things, Lodge 49, Kidding, Snowfall, Veep, and I Didn't Do It. White appeared as a guest star in 9-1-1, The Middle, Mike & Molly, Herman's Head, Hangin' with Mr. Cooper, Roc, My So-Called Life, Chicago Hope, Living Single, The Shield, Southland, How to Get Away with Murder, and Young Sheldon.

White has had several theater roles, most notably playing the role of Camae in Katori Hall's The Mountaintop and Arlene/Lacy in Eight Nights. In 2010, White played a role in The Ballad of Emmett Till - a role which she reprised in an online reading of the play in 2020.

From 2001 to 2005, she provided the voice of Dijonay Jones on the animated Disney Channel series The Proud Family. White stated that series creator Bruce W. Smith designed the character as White was reading lines for an initial presentation of the show. In 2022, she reprised her role as Dijonay Jones in the revival series The Proud Family: Louder and Prouder for which she was nominated for an Annie Award for Outstanding Achievement for Voice Acting in a Television Production.

White played the role of Shirley Hughes on Dahmer – Monster: The Jeffrey Dahmer Story, a role that allowed her to utilize American Sign Language, which she has been learning since she was 15. White says that the role provided her an outlet for anger, anxiety, and fear from the COVID-19 pandemic and the social unrest from the deaths of George Floyd and Ahmed Arbery. Dahmer - Monster: The Jeffrey Dahmer Show became Netflix's second most-watched series of all time.

White was a guest speaker in the online acting class Mastering the Business of Acting, a program that teaches acting students the business side of the acting industry.

In 2023, White appeared in a FanDuel commercial alongside former American football player Rob Gronkowski.

== Personal life ==
White has never married and has no children, although she was in a relationship with her co-star Malcolm-Jamal Warner for seven and a half years.

== Filmography ==
=== Film ===
Year	Title	Role	Notes
1989	Lean on Me	Kaneesha Carter	
1995	Statistically Speaking	-	Short
1996	Once Upon a Time...When We Were Colored	Mary	
2004	Fronterz	-	
2005	The Proud Family Movie	Dijonay Jones (voice)	TV movie
2006	The Ties That Bind	Madison	Short
2007	I Gotta Be Better Than Keanu	Acting Teacher	
2011	Aurora Borealis	Head Nurse	Short
2011	Kissed by the Devil	June Henderson	Short
2011	Cheaper to Keep Her	Koren	Video
2012	Who's Watching the Kids	Susan	
2012	A Bitter Pill	Nurse Kathy	Short
2012	Love Overboard	Tina	Video
2012	Where Do We Go from Here	Florence Theresa Ford	Short
2013	Jump In: The Movie	Camryn Davis	
2014	Freeloader	Aretha	Short
2016	Caged	Karen Stevens	Short
2016	Silent Cry Aloud	Dina	
2016	Mule	Nurse Vasquez	Short
2017	Conflict of Interest	Gabriele's Mother	
2017	a.m. Sunday	Julia	Short
2019	Unspeakable Indiscretions	Paulette	
2021	Love, for Real	Marie	TV movie
2021	'Tis the Season to be Merry	Sonia Hendricks	TV movie
2026	A Proud Family Wizmas	Dijonay Jones (voice)	

=== Television ===
Year	Title	Role	Notes
1989	A Man Called Hawk	Lisa	Episode: "The Divided Child" & "Beautiful Are the Stars"
1990–92	The Cosby Show	Charmaine Brown	Recurring cast: seasons 7-8
1992–93	A Different World	Charmaine Brown	Guest: season 5; main cast: season 6
1993	Herman's Head	Rene	Episode: "There's a Fly Girl In My Soup"
1993–97	Hangin' with Mr. Cooper	Florence	Recurring cast: seasons 2 & 5; guest: season 4
1993–94	Roc	Michelle	Recurring cast: season 3
1993–94	Getting By	Yolanda	Recurring cast: season 2
1994	The Fresh Prince of Bel-Air	Jewel Robertson	2 episodes
1994–95	My So-Called Life	Abyssinia Churchill	2 episodes
1995	Me and the Boys	Janet	Recurring cast
1995	Chicago Hope	Jennifer Koosman	Episode: "Hello Goodbye"
1995	The Parent 'Hood	Nina	Episode: "Track Dreams"
1995	Too Something	–	Episode: "Meter Feeders"
1996	The Home Court	Leslie	Episode: "Laborer of Love"
1996	Living Single	Shayla	Episode: "Woman to Woman"
1996	Dave's World	Natalie	Episode: "Do You Want to Know a Secret?"
1996–2000	Malcolm & Eddie	Nicolette Vandross	Main cast
2000	Seven Days	Tracy Donovan	Episode: "Mr Donovan's Neighborhood"
2001	Strong Medicine	Constance 'Connie' MacRane	Episode: "Relief"
2001–05	The Proud Family	Dijonay Jones (voice)	Main cast
2002	Jeremiah	Rickie	Episode: "City of Roses"
2003	The Shield	Dez' Girlfriend	Episode: "Barnstormers"
2004	Boston Public	Sonia Williamson	Episode: "Chapter Seventy-Eight"
2005	The Bernie Mac Show	Denise	Episode: "The Big Payback"
2007	Random! Cartoons	Mindy 500 (voice)	Episode: "Hero Heights"
2012	Suits	Doris Miller	Episode: "The Choice"
2013	Golden Boy	Lydia Lent	Episode: "Vicious Cycle"
2013	Southland	Irene	Episode: "Heroes"
2014	The Mentalist	Elsie Graham	Episode: "Black Helicopters"
2014	How to Get Away with Murder	Carla	Episode: "Let's Go Scooping"
2015	I Didn't Do It	Betty LeBow	Recurring cast: season 2
2016	Mike & Molly	Paula	Episode: "The Adoption Option"
2016	Veep	Kimberly	Episode: "C**tgate"
2016	Shameless	Sylvie Prum	Episode: "Home Sweet Homeless Shelter"
2016	The Middle	Mrs. Roberts	Episode: "Look Who's Not Talking"
2016–18	Animal Kingdom	Dina	Guest cast: seasons 1-3
2017	Snowfall	Doris Perkins	Episode: "Make Them Birds Fly"
2018	Kidding	Latrice	Episode: "Philliam"
2018	Raven's Home	Loretta	Episode: "Keepin' It Real"
2019	Lodge 49	Trish	Recurring cast: season 2
2019–20	Better Things	Debra	Guest cast: seasons 3-4
2020	Cherish the Day	Samantha	Episode: "Genesis"
2020	Mom	Natalie	Recurring Cast: season 7
2021	9-1-1	Avery Webber	Episode: "First Responders"
2021	The Zip Code Plays: Los Angeles	LaShae Fair	Episode: "91331: Pacoima – Gold & Shine"
2022	Dahmer – Monster: The Jeffrey Dahmer Story	Shirley Hughes	Recurring cast
2022–present	The Proud Family: Louder and Prouder	Dijonay Jones (voice)	Main cast
2022–24	Bruh	Hilda	Recurring cast: season 3; guest: season 4
2023	The Kick of Destiny	Agent	Episode: "Agent"
2023	Young Sheldon	Officer Larson	Episode: "A Stolen Truck and Going on the Lam"
2025	Chibiverse	Dijonay Jones (voice)	Episode: "Cheer Up Chibis"
2025-present	Georgie & Mandy's First Marriage	Lindsey	Recurring cast: seasons 2-3
