= Raquel Lee =

American actress (born 1986)

- Born: October 13, 1986 (age 40); Los Angeles, California, U.S.
- Other names: Raquel Lee Bolleau; Raquel Bolleau
- Occupation: Actress
- Years active: 1998–present
- Spouse: Edouard Bolleau (m. 2016)
- Children: 3

Raquel Lee (born October 13, 1986) is an American actress who appeared on Nickelodeon's The Amanda Show during the show's first season.

== Career ==
From 2001 to 2005, she provided the voice of Nubia Gross on the animated series The Proud Family, and did so on its Disney+ revival series The Proud Family: Louder and Prouder from 2022 to 2025. She also co-starred with Tahj Mowry, Mark Curry, and Dawnn Lewis in the Disney Channel Original Movie The Poof Point.

In 2024, following her negative experience with the Quiet on Set documentary, she posted a video on TikTok stating that she was done with acting and wanted to focus on her family. However, in 2025 and 2026, she continued to reprise her role as Nubia on Louder and Prouder and its Christmas special, A Proud Family Wizmas.

== Personal life ==
Lee married her husband Edouard Bolleau in 2016. Together, they have three children.

== Legal action against Disney ==
In August 2026, Lee filed a lawsuit against The Walt Disney Company, alleging corporate negligence and a failure to protect minor actors. According to the complaint, Lee was 14 years old and filming the Disney Channel movie The Poof Point in Utah in 2001 when she was repeatedly sexually assaulted by a middle-aged production staff member. The lawsuit outlines that Disney maintained an unsafe working environment permitting adults to interact with minor actors without proper oversight, ignored warning signs regarding her interactions with the staff member, and failed to intervene despite the alleged misconduct occurring within view of cast and crew members and even audible to sound technicians. Additionally, the complaint alleges that Disney blamed Lee herself when her behavior and job performance dramatically shifted following the abuse, and the suit seeks economic damages, compensation for emotional distress, and punitive damages.

== Filmography ==
Films and television
Year	Title	Role	Notes
1998	Malcolm & Eddie	Monica	1 episode
1999–2000	The Amanda Show	Herself, various characters	Main role (season 1)
2000	Double Dare 2000	Herself	Along with the cast of The Amanda Show; 2 episodes
2001	The Poof Point	Marie Ballard	Television film
2001–2005	The Proud Family	Nubia Gross	Recurring role, 24 episodes, voice-over role
2002	The Hughleys	Terria	2 episodes
2002	The Bernie Mac Show		1 episode
2005	The Proud Family Movie	Nubia Gross	Animated television film
2005	Commander in Chief		1 episode
2009	A Numbers Game	Sasha	Independent short film
2013	Real Husbands of Hollywood	Charmagne	Recurring role
2017	Grow House	Terri	
2022–2025	The Proud Family: Louder and Prouder	Nubia Gross	Voice-over role; credited as Raquel Lee Bolleau
2024	Quiet on Set: The Dark Side of Kids TV	Herself	Documentary series; 2 episodes; credited as Raquel Lee Bolleau
2026	A Proud Family Wizmas	Nubia Gross	
