= Tommy Davidson =

American actor and comedian

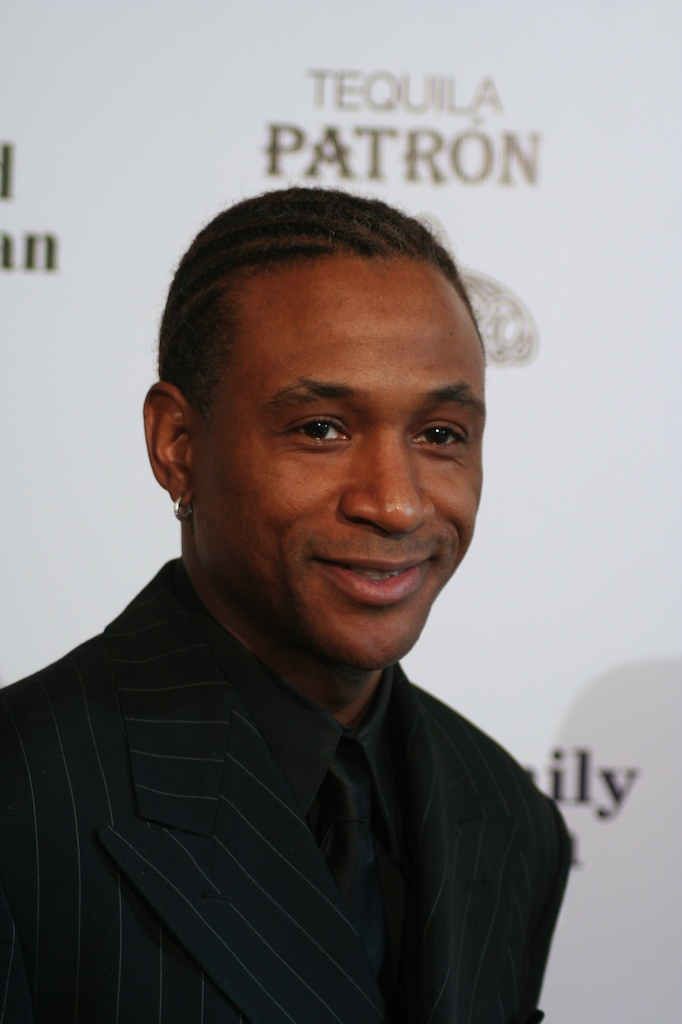
- Davidson in 2008
- Born: Anthony Reed; November 10, 1963 (age 63); Rolling Fork, Mississippi, U.S.
- Occupations: Actor; comedian
- Years active: 1984–present
- Spouse: Amanda Moore (m. 2015)
- Children: 6

Tommy Davidson (born Anthony Reed; November 10, 1963) is an American actor and comedian. He was an original cast member on the sketch comedy TV show In Living Color, and portrayed Mitchell on Between Brothers (1997–1999), Dexter on Malcolm & Eddie (1999–2000), the voice of Oscar Proud on The Proud Family (2001–2005) and its 2022 revival series, Rushon in Booty Call (1997), Womack in Bamboozled (2000), and Cream Corn in Black Dynamite (2009) and its subsequent television series. In 2022, Davidson appeared on Storybound reading from his book, Living in Color: What's Funny about Me.

== Early life ==
Born Anthony Reed in Rolling Fork, Mississippi, Davidson was abandoned in the trash at 18 months old, before being rescued by a white woman who became his adoptive mother. His parents changed his name to Thomas Davidson when they adopted him. He has two older siblings, Michael and Beryle. He and his family had moved from Colorado to Wyoming to Oregon by the time he was five years old.

His parents divorced when he was five years old, and his mother and the children moved to Washington, D.C. They later moved to Wheaton, Maryland, then the neighborhood of Rosemary Hills in Silver Spring, and then Takoma Park. He attended Rosemary Hills Elementary School, Sligo Middle School, and Bethesda-Chevy Chase High School, in Bethesda, Maryland. After graduating in 1981, he studied communications and interned at the radio station of the University of the District of Columbia for one semester. He had jobs in the kitchen of the Walter Reed National Military Medical Center, cleaning at Roy Rogers, bussing tables at an IHOP in Wheaton, and working in the stockroom of Hechinger in Hyattsville, Maryland.

== Career ==
Davidson started his career as a stand-up comedian in 1984, when a childhood friend convinced him to perform stand-up at The Penthouse strip club in Park View, Washington, D.C. He continued performing in various comedy clubs throughout the Washington Metropolitan region, Baltimore, and Philadelphia. He opened concerts for Patti LaBelle, Starpoint, and Kenny G. He performed on a fundraising telethon for WHMM in 1987.

Davidson won an amateur stand-up competition at the Apollo Theater in 1987. Soon afterwards, he moved to North Hollywood, California, where he met Martin Lawrence, who lived in his building. He performed at the Comedy Store, where Robert Townsend heard of him and asked him to be the warm-up comic for an HBO special. After performing at Luther Vandross and Anita Baker shows, he appeared on The Arsenio Hall Show.

== Personal life ==
Davidson has six children with three women.

Davidson and his wife Amanda Moore married in 2015. They have one child together, a son born in 2021.

== Filmography ==
=== Film ===
Year	Title	Role	Notes
1991	Strictly Business	Bobby	
1993	CB4	Weird Warren	
1995	Ace Ventura: When Nature Calls	The Tiny Warrior	
1997	Booty Call	Rushon	
1997	Plump Fiction	Julius	
1998	Woo	Tim	
1999	Pros & Cons	Ron Carter	
2000	Bamboozled	Womack/Sleep'n Eat	
2000	Santa Who?	Max the Elf	TV movie
2002	Juwanna Mann	Puff Smokey Smoke	
2002	The Scream Team	Jumper	TV movie
2004	Funky Monkey	Harland	
2005	The Proud Family Movie	Oscar Proud (voice)	TV movie
2009	Black Dynamite	Cream Corn	
2009	Pimp 24/7	Detective Bill	TV movie
2011	Dance Fu	Addict	
2012	Who Killed Soul Glow	Himself	
2016	Sharknado 4: The 4th Awakens	Aston Reynolds	TV movie
2018	Fury of the Fist and the Golden Fleece	Homeless Comic	
2018	Frat Pack	Big Daddy	
2021	Miracles Across 125th Street	Bishop Wishoff	TV movie
2023	Outlaw Johnny Black	Clancy	
2023	So Fly Christmas	Pastor	TV movie
2024	The Realtor	Bruce Kevin	
2024	Mr. Santa: A Christmas Extravaganza	Mr. Burns	
2025	F Plus	Gary Garrie	
2026	A Proud Family Wizmas	Oscar Proud (voice)	

=== Television ===
Year	Title	Role	Notes
1989	CBS Summer Playhouse	Prince Tariq	Episode: "Coming to America"
1990–94	In Living Color	Himself/Cast Member	Main cast
1992	Roc	Donald	Episode: "The Hand That Rocs the Cradle"
1993	The Commish	Reese	Episode: "Rising Sun"
1993	Martin	Varnel Hill	Episode: "Hollywood Swinging Parts 1 & 2"
1994	Just for Laughs	Himself	Episode: "Episode #9.1"
1994	Duckman	Marvin (voice)	Episode: "Joking the Chicken"
1995	Happily Ever After: Fairy Tales for Every Child	Jester (voice)	Episode: "The Frog Prince"
1996	The Ren & Stimpy Show	Sammy Mantis (voice)	Episode: "Sammy and Me"
1997	MADTv	Himself/Host	Episode: "Episode #2.14"
1997	Space Ghost Coast to Coast	Himself	Episode: "Pavement"
1997	Boston Common	Darrell	Episode: "Soup to Nuts"
1997–99	Between Brothers	Mitchell Ford	Main cast
1999	All That	Himself	Episode: "All That Live! (100th Episode)"
1999	Premium Blend	Himself/Host	Main host: Season 3
1999	Happily Ever After: Fairy Tales for Every Child	Cassim (voice)	Episode: "Ali Baba and the Forty Thieves"
1999–2000	Malcolm & Eddie	Dexter Sherman	Guest: Season 3, Recurring cast: Season 4
2000	Cousin Skeeter	-	Episode: "The Feminine Ms. Skeet"
2000	The Wonderful World of Disney	Max (Head Elf)	Episode: "Santa Who?"
2001	The Test	Himself/Panelist	Episode: "The Fatal-Attraction Test"
2001	Weakest Link	Himself	Episode: "Comedians Special"
2001–03	Hollywood Squares	Himself/Panelist	Recurring guest
2001–05	The Proud Family	Oscar Proud (voice)	Main cast
2002	I Love the '80s	Himself	Recurring guest
2002	MADTv	Woogie Jones Johnson	Episode: "Episode #8.11 & #8.19 & #9.6"
2004	The Sharon Osbourne Show	Himself/Guest Host	Episode: "March 29, 2004"
2004–05	The Bernie Mac Show	Lou	Guest cast: Seasons 3–4
2005	The Drop	Himself	Episode: "Episode #2.8"
2005	Poorman's Bikini Beach	Himself	Episode: "La Bamba Tour, Internet Modelpalooza, and Benchwarmer Party"
2005	Lilo & Stitch: The Series	Oscar Proud (voice)	Episode: "Spats"
2006	In the Mix	Himself	Episode: "Episode #2.5"
2006–07	Comics Unleashed	Himself	Episode: "Episode #1.19" & "#2.1"
2007	Everybody Hates Chris	Eddie	Episode: “Everybody Hates Houseguests”
2008	Live at Gotham	Himself/Host	Episode: "Episode #3.4"
2008	Battleground Earth	Himself	Episode: "Finale at the Greek"
2009	Make 'Em Laugh: The Funny Business of America	Himself	Recurring guest
2009	For the Love of Ray J	Himself	Episode: "The Foxes are Feuding"
2009	Comedy.TV	Himself	Episode: "Episode #1.8"
2009–18	Laugh Factory	Himself	Recurring guest
2010	Extreme Makeover: Home Edition	Himself	Episode: "The Johnson Family"
2011	Comedy All-Stars	Himself/Host	Main host
2011–15	Black Dynamite	Cream Corn (voice)	Main cast
2013	Celebrity Ghost Stories	Himself	Episode: "Coco/Craig Kilborn/Diana DeGarmo/Tommy Davidson"
2014	Gotham Comedy Live	Himself/Host	Episode: "Tommy Davidson"
2014	Chopped	Himself/Contestant	Episode: "Chopped Tournament of Stars: Comedians!"
2015	Celebrity Wife Swap	Himself	Episode: "Corey Feldman and Tommy Davidson"
2015	Real Husbands of Hollywood	Himself	Episode: "Kevin Davis Jr."
2016	Celebrity Family Feud	Himself	Episode: "Tommy Davidson vs. Kristi Yamaguchi/Dave Foley vs. Jalen Rose"
2016	Worst Cooks in America	Himself/Contestant	Main contestant: Season 9
2016–17	Celebrity Name Game	Himself/Celebrity Player	Episode: "Melissa Peterman & Tommy Davidson 1-3"
2016–18	Vacation Creation	Himself/Host	Main host
2017–19	Funny You Should Ask	Himself	Recurring cast: Season 1, guest: Season 2
2018	I'm Dying Up Here	Alan Lucas	Episode: "Plus One"
2021	Dark Humor	Himself	Recurring guest
2021	Soul of a Nation	Himself	Recurring guest: season 1
2021	Uncensored	Himself	Episode: "Tommy Davidson"
2021–24	The Ms. Pat Show	Marcus	Guest cast: Seasons 1–2 & 4
2022	The Real	Himself/Guest Co-Host	Episode: "Men of Comedy Week - Day 3"
2022	Phat Tuesdays: The Era of Hip Hop Comedy	Himself	Main guest
2022	The Neighborhood	Jordan	Episode: "Welcome to the Feud"
2022	A Black Lady Sketch Show	Jimothy James Paul	Episode: "Y'all Want Some Blood Juice?"
2022–26	The Proud Family: Louder and Prouder	Oscar Proud (voice)	Main cast
2023	See It Loud: The History of Black Television	Himself	Episode: "Laughing Out Loud"
2023	Celebrity Squares	Himself	Episode: "Can't Have No Cold Hot Sauce"
2023	Disney How NOT to Draw	Oscar Proud (voice)	Episode: "Suga Mama"
2023	Disney Theme Song Takeover	Oscar Proud (voice)	Episode: "LaCienega's Theme Song Takeover"
2025	Poppa's House	Jarnold the Elevator Guy	Episode: "Elevator Friend"
2025	Chibiverse	Oscar Proud (voice)	Episode: "Penny and the Chibi Scouts"

=== Music videos ===
Year	Artist	Song	Role
1990	Kid 'n Play	"Fun House"	Devil
1998	Queen Latifah featuring Apache	"Bananas (Who You Gonna Call?)"	Himself
2001	Dr. Dre featuring Knoc-turn'al	"Bad Intentions"	Himself
2002	Snoop Dogg featuring Pharrell Williams	"From tha Chuuuch to da Palace"	Officer

=== Comedy specials ===
Year	Title	Role
1990	Takin' It to D.C.	Stand-up Special
1991	Illin' in Philly	Stand-up Special
1996	On the Strength	Stand-up Special
2009	Shaq & Cedric the Entertainer Present: All Star Comedy Jam	Stand-up Special

== Book ==
- Davidson, Tommy; Teicholz, Tom (2020). Living in Color. Kensington Publishing. ISBN 978-1-4967-1294-3.
