= The Proud Family: Louder and Prouder =

American animated sitcom

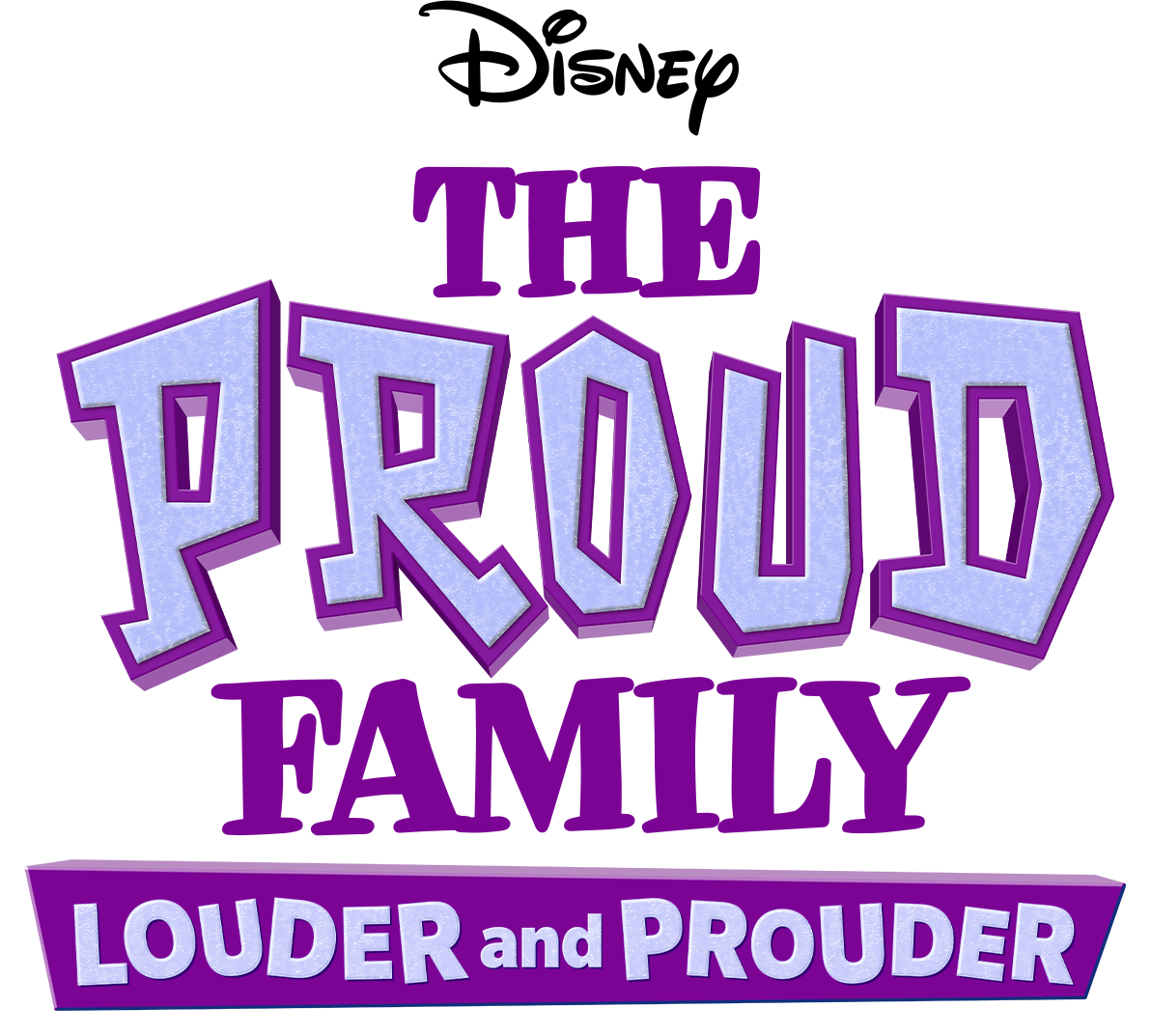
- Genre: Adventure Animated sitcom; Coming-of-age
- Created by: Bruce W. Smith; Ralph Farquhar
- Based on: The Proud Family by Bruce W. Smith
- Voices of: Kyla Pratt; Tommy Davidson; Jo Marie Payton; Paula Jai Parker; Cedric the Entertainer; Keke Palmer; Alisa Reyes; Karen Malina White; Soleil Moon Frye; Raquel Lee Bolleau
- Opening theme: "Proud Family" by Joyce Wrice
- Ending theme: "Proud Family" (instrumental)
- Composer: Kurt Farquhar
- Country of origin: United States
- Original language: English
- No. of seasons: 4
- No. of episodes: 39 (+ 1 unaired) (list of episodes)

Production
- Executive producers: Bruce W. Smith; Ralph Farquhar; Calvin Brown, Jr.
- Producer: Jan Hirota
- Running time: 23–30 minutes
- Production companies: Disney Television Animation; BaR Productions

Original release
- Network: Disney+
- Release: February 23, 2022 – July 29, 2026

Related
- The Proud Family; The Proud Family Movie; A Proud Family Wizmas

The Proud Family: Louder and Prouder is an American animated sitcom created by Bruce W. Smith and Ralph Farquhar that premiered on Disney+ on February 23, 2022. It is a revival of the original series, that originally aired on Disney Channel from 2001 to 2005. Set in the 2020s, Louder and Prouder retcons the original series as also having taken place in the 2020s (rather than the 2000s, as originally depicted). In addition, Louder and Prouder retcons the events of The Proud Family Movie (2005) to have been a dream.

In April 2022, Disney+ confirmed that the show's second season was in production, which premiered on Disney+ on February 1, 2023. The series made its linear premiere on January 7, 2023, on Disney Channel, and on Disney XD on January 8, 2023. The third season was released on August 6, 2025. In June 2025, it was announced the series had been renewed for a fourth and final season, which premiered on July 29, 2026. A holiday special A Proud Family Wizmas was released on November 14, 2026, on Disney+.

== Premise ==
The series follows Penny Proud, still a 14-year-old middle school girl and her family, as they navigate their lives in the 2020s. Suga Mama returns, as do Michael, Dijonay, Zoey, and LaCienega. Two new kids, Maya and KG, along with their adoptive gay fathers, try to adapt to life in Smithville (originally named Wizville in the original series; renamed to Emilyville after the season 2 finale, "Juneteenth").

== Characters ==
=== Main ===
- Penny Proud (voiced by Kyla Pratt, sung by Tone Loc in "Snackland", Logan Browning as an adult in "When You Wish Upon a Roker") is the main protagonist of the series. She is a 14-year-old African-American girl who is usually embarrassed by her father, Oscar. She enjoys hanging out with her friends, even though they have gotten her into trouble, and left her to face danger by herself many times. She always listens to and respects her parents, but often caves in to peer pressure. She is a talented singer as shown when she becomes a solo singer for Wizard Kelly productions but quits after missing her old life. Penny is a straight 'A' student and is part of the school newspaper staff. At one point, she tried out for cheerleading, but due to having an accident with the stage being converted into a giant CD, LaCienega got the last spot on the squad. Penny is also good at writing and reciting poetry and becomes jealous when her friend Dijonay becomes just as good as her. Convinced that everyone likes her, she tries to become friends with Maya Leibowitz-Jenkins, a new student at school. She is also a talented athlete who excels at football, basketball, softball and double-dutch.
- Oscar Proud (voiced by Tommy Davidson) is the overprotective father of Penny, BeBe and CeCe, husband of Trudy, younger brother of Bobby Proud and son of Suga Mama. Oscar is still characterized as hyperactive, immature, childish, but a well-meaning man. Oscar owned and operated his own snack food business called "Proud Snacks", which officially closed in the episode "BeBe". During the first season, he opens a new amusement park called "Snackland", which is unsafe but quickly becomes popular due to its inherent danger providing Emilyville residents adrenaline-inducing thrills. It closes later in the same season, but it gets re-opened in the third season thanks to Oscar making a deal with Wizard Kelly.
- Charlette "Suga Mama" Towne-Proud (voiced by Jo Marie Payton, Dominique Fishback as a child in "Old Towne Road") is Penny, BeBe, and CeCe's hip, wrestling-loving paternal grandmother, Oscar and Bobby's mother and Trudy's mother-in-law who does Tae Bo. She is very nice but sassy, and always gets straight to the point when she talks. For her occasionally ill temper, she can tease and even beat up Oscar, but loves him deep down. She has the highest respect for Trudy. Her age is unknown and is often made fun of by Oscar. An event from 20 years ago shows her looking exactly the same as before. Suga Mama is in love with her neighbor Papi, who often makes rude remarks about her in Spanish which she thinks are compliments. She shows extra amounts of love for her poodle, Puff. She is really into pink dresses and afro puffs, hence the name of her dog, Puff. Like Puff, Suga Mama also displays a really warm relationship with Penny and sometimes even agrees with her ideas.
- Trudy Proud (née Parker) (voiced by Paula Jai Parker) is the veterinarian mother of Penny, BeBe and CeCe, wife of Oscar, daughter-in-law of Suga Mama and sister-in-law of Bobby Proud. She comes from a relatively wealthy family, including her father who is a doctor and her sister Diana who is a famous actress. She often gives Penny advice when Penny is in trouble. Trudy is married to Oscar, and in turn often forces him to see the logical side of an argument. She is the level-headed one in the family along with Suga Mama, though she can be bossy, sassy and jealous sometimes.
- Bobby Proud (voiced by Cedric the Entertainer) is Oscar's older brother, Suga Mama's elder son, Trudy's brother-in-law and Penny, Bebe and CeCe's uncle. He is a fan of groups like Kool & the Gang among others. He sings and talks like the lead singers of the 1970s funk bands Cameo (Larry Blackmon), The Ohio Players (Sugarfoot) and The Commodores (Lionel Richie). He has a 1959 Cadillac Eldorado that only plays one song and has hydraulics and also a parachute for some safety reasons. Suga Mama favors him over Oscar. He often has Oscar do things that annoy him very often, but lead to Oscar meeting beautiful women. For example, he gets Oscar to be an ice cream man at a basketball game, which leads to one of the cheerleaders asking Oscar out on a date. Bobby and his band, DisFunkshunal Junction, are a parody of band leader George Clinton (also known as Dr. Funkenstein) and his band Parliament-Funkadelic, also known as P-Funk. In this reboot, Bobby's 1970s disco wardrobe is updated to a more 1990s outfit, including hammer pants.
- Maya Leibowitz-Jenkins (voiced by Keke Palmer, Lena Waithe as an adult in "When You Wish Upon a Roker" and "Forward to the Past") is a 14-year-old activist and new resident in Smithville, who is the adopted child of Barry and Randall Leibowitz-Jenkins. She is often seen reading real-life books themed around anti-racism.
- LaCienega Boulevardez (voiced by Alisa Reyes, Karrie Martin as an adult in "When You Wish Upon a Roker") is Penny's Latina frenemy and the daughter of Felix and Sunset Boulevardez. She is the most popular and beautiful girl in Penny's school, as well as an excellent student. In the show, LaCienega is able to convince her parents and the Prouds that she is a very sweet and innocent young lady, but actually, she is very vain, selfish, rude, petty, shallow, and spoiled. While in the original show, Penny and LaCienega despised each other and were only usually stuck hanging out with each other, since LaCienega is friends with Dijonay, and their parents and grandparents are best friends, the animosity is significantly toned down in the new show and the two are surprisingly more of friends with rare moments of conflict. Despite her rebellious attitude, she is secretly envious of Penny deep down and likes her a little bit, but would never show it. LaCienega and her mother Sunset are named after La Cienega Boulevard and Sunset Boulevard, two Los Angeles area arterial roads that meet in West Hollywood, California.
- Dijonay Jones (voiced by Karen Malina White, Bresha Webb as an adult in "When You Wish Upon a Roker") is Penny's selfish and untrustworthy yet enthusiastic and caring best friend. She had an obsessive crush on Sticky in The Proud Family. She also loves to gossip and has gotten Penny in trouble many times. Eventually, Penny gets fed up with Dijonay mistreating her, and completely loses her trust in her, though they still remain friends. Dijonay's name is a pun on the name of Best Foods'/Hellmann's Dijonnaise, and she has nine younger siblings all named after spices, seasonings and condiments. She later has a crush on KG after Sticky's family moves away. However, in Season 2, she starts dating Darrius St. Vil.
- Zoey Howzer (voiced by Soleil Moon Frye, Holly Winter as an adult in "When You Wish Upon a Roker") is geeky, timid, shy, kind, and smart. She is very insecure about her looks and wants to be accepted. Zoey is known for being a follower and Penny often has to talk sense into her. Her mother is a limousine driver while her aunt is a lawyer. Zoey enjoys dancing but has little faith in her skills. When she competes in a dance battle, however, she proves herself to be just as good as, if not better than, her friends.
- BeBe (voiced by Aiden Dodson) and CeCe Proud (voiced by Bresha Webb) are Penny's troublemaking 2-year-old fraternal twin siblings. BeBe is a boy with an afro and always has a pacifier in his mouth, while CeCe is a girl with brown hair and pink dress. BeBe and CeCe are named after the gospel music brother and sister duo, BeBe and CeCe Winans. BeBe's eyes are never seen, due to his afro hairstyle. They love Penny very much, but at times they play too roughly with her. They are often seen playing with Puff, and most of the time, Puff ends up getting injured. In this series, they are almost capable of speech, but because they are almost babbling, their speech is accompanied by subtitles. It is also revealed that their full names are Benjamin and Cecilia Proud. It is revealed that BeBe is autistic in the season 2 episode of the same name (BeBe being autistic was confirmed by the series creators during season 1). His voice actor, Aiden Dodson, is also autistic. Due to casting changes, Tara Strong did not return to reprise her role for the twins.
- Puff (vocal effects provided by Carlos Alazraqui) is Suga Mama's beloved pet poodle. Puff is often tormented by BeBe and CeCe, who play roughly with him. He does, however, show a soft side for Penny. It is also shown that Puff likes to watch drama shows. Due to casting changes, Tara Strong did not return to reprise her role for Puff.

=== Supporting ===
- The Gross Sisters (Nubia voiced by Raquel Lee Bolleau) are the main antagonists of the series and the former neighborhood bullies who are almost always seen together, who go around stealing money from students, faculty, and even parents (including their own). They live with their family in a rough housing estate in the city, so they have to do chores to support it. Nubia is the leader and the only Gross sister who can talk while her sisters (whom she often treats poorly), the heavily built Olei (who serves as Nubia's bodyguard), and the short-statured Gina (who collects the money), are silent. Nubia's catchphrase is "Hands up, cash out!" Despite the constant mistreatment and abuse, Nubia is protective over her sisters and threatens anyone who might endanger or harm them. Their names are a play on skincare products Neutrogena, Nivea, and Olay, which is ironic because their skin is noted to be dry, ashy, and blue. After the events of The Proud Family Movie, the Gross Sisters changed their ways. They quit bullying and stealing money from people. The Gross Sisters eventually became interested in hip hop and started their own rap group. All three sing a rap song called "Hands Up Cash Out". Olei has a crush on KG. In the third season, Nubia's real name is revealed to be Gabrielle when she joins the Wiz Kids, and her ashiness briefly disappears.
- Barry (voiced by Zachary Quinto) and Randall Leibowitz-Jenkins (voiced by Billy Porter) are the dads of their adopted children, Maya Leibowitz-Jenkins and Francis "KG" Leibowitz-Jenkins and are an interracial gay couple. Barry is a detective who works alongside Sunset, while Randall works at the bank as a loaner. Quinto and Porter are both gay actors.
- Michael Collins (voiced by EJ Johnson, Jeremy O. Harris as an adult in "When You Wish Upon a Roker") is Penny's flamboyant friend and the son of the school coach. Michael is openly gay and Non-binary in the series. They were previously voiced by Phil LaMarr in the original series.
- Kareem Abdul-Jabbar Brown (voiced by Asante Blackk, Ashton Sanders as an adult in "When You Wish Upon a Roker") is Penny's boyfriend. He is named after Kareem Abdul-Jabbar and James Brown.
- Francis "KG" Leibowitz-Jenkins (voiced by Artist "A Boogie" Dubose, Daniel "Desus Nice" Baker as an adult in "When You Wish Upon a Roker") is Maya's adoptive brother. He is very tech-savvy and is a competitive gamer known as "King Great" (hence the nickname "KG"). Dijonay Jones and Olei each have crushes on him.
- Mr. Chips (vocal effects by Carlos Alazraqui) is a monkey who is often Oscar's test subject and right-hand man in his schemes. Like many characters, he is often annoyed and frustrated at Oscar's antics. Yet Mr. Chips shows a lasting loyalty towards him.
- Wizard Kelly (voiced by Aries Spears) is an incredibly wealthy and famous businessman who made his fortune playing professional basketball. He owns various businesses that are named after him. A running gag is how he is too tall to fit in the picture, so every image and video of him shows only up to the lower half of his face, his eyes never being shown on-screen. In the first episode, it is shown that he is running for mayor, and he gets elected in "Juneteenth".
- Felix Boulevardez (voiced by Carlos Mencia) is Oscar's best friend and neighbor. (Oscar and Felix were also the names of the lead characters from the TV sitcom The Odd Couple). He is the father of LaCienega and the husband of Sunset. He and Oscar often get into trouble together. He and Oscar both have dominating wives, both have parents living in their home (Oscar has Suga Mama and Felix has Papi) and both have teenage daughters. The differences between them are that Oscar is tall and skinny and Felix is short and overweight, and Felix is also richer (due to his construction site named after him) and more successful than Oscar at everything, but that does not affect their friendship. They are also very strict with their daughters hanging out with boys.
- Sunset Boulevardez (voiced by Maria Canals-Barrera in seasons 1 and 2, and Melissa De Sousa in season 3) is Felix's wife and Trudy's best friend. She is the mother of LaCienega and was promoted from police officer to detective.
- Papi Boulevardez (voiced by Alvaro Gutierrez, Kevin Michael Richardson while laughing) is Felix's father, Sunset's father-in-law and Suga Mama's love interest. He is the grandfather of LaCienega. He speaks only Spanish and as a result he can get away with insulting Suga Mama. However, Suga Mama believes that he is sweet-talking her which only increases her affection towards Papi. Nevertheless, the two are often seen spending time together and genuinely enjoying each other's company. He is also known for his trademark cackling (provided by Kevin Michael Richardson) when after he insults Suga Mama or on some occasions. Ironically in The Proud Family Movie, Papi becomes enamored with the Spanish-speaking clone of Suga Mama, who promptly beat him up when he insulted her. Papi is a parody of Cesar Romero's character The Joker on the 1966 TV series Batman (as Romero was of Spanish-Cuban descent and his laugh is reminiscent of the Joker's; Richardson previously provided the voice of the Joker in The Batman).
- Dr. Payne (voiced by Kevin Michael Richardson) is the Prouds' doctor, whose build and mannerisms are based on those of Mr. T. Oscar usually suffers painful treatment at his hands. He calls Oscar "Fool", Penny "Itty Bitty" and Suga Mama "Sugar Bear".
- Peabo (voiced by Cree Summer) is the Prouds' 8-year-old neighbor. He is very smart for his age and often tries to warn Oscar whenever Oscar does something dangerous, though Oscar never listens and suffers for it. He is the only one who is known to like Proud Snacks. He at first has a crush on Penny, then Zoey, and ends up dating one of Dijonay's sisters. He later becomes Wizard Kelly's protege after Oscar loses a bet with Kelly.
- Vanessa Vue (voiced by Brenda Song) is a Thai-American local news anchor who is always out for a story. She is shown airing critical stories about Oscar Proud, his amusement park, his company Proud Snacks, and other issues in Smithville. She often talks about how she hates her job.
- Lil' Wiz is Wizard Kelly's son.
- Sir Paid-a-Lot (voiced by Aries Spears) is a famous rapper under Wizard Kelly's record label, a parody of Sir Mix-a-Lot and DMX.
- Myron Lewinski (voiced by Marcus T. Paulk, Jaden Smith as an adult in "When You Wish Upon a Roker") is a nerdy kid that has a crush on Penny. He later has a crush on Zoey, who reciprocates his feelings. His surname was revealed in season 3.
- Principal Rhonda Hightower (voiced by Patricia Belcher): In the original series, Miss Hightower was a teacher with a very timid voice who ran programs like the debutante ball and the cultural exchange program. A running gag involved her trying to get everyone's attention in a quiet nice voice, before finally yelling in a booming voice while insulting her students or the crowd. In Louder and Prouder, she is now the Principal for Willy T. Ribbs Middle School and her first name is revealed to be Rhonda. Her name and voice are an homage to Officer Laverne Hooks in the Police Academy films.
- Al Roker (voiced by himself): As in the original series, this version of Roker is a Faustian wish-granting type who often causes problems for Penny and her friends. His design is updated to reflect his most recent gastric bypass surgery as well as his purple glasses.
- Klaus (voiced by Kevin Michael Richardson) is a buff muscular man who is often seen in positions of authority such as a security guard, bodyguard, or inspector. His voice is a parody of Arnold Schwarzenegger.
- Shuggie (voiced by CeeLo Green) is a giant panda that lives at the zoo who can talk, sing and play the guitar. He is named for Shuggie Otis, and he even sings Otis's hit song "Strawberry Letter 23".
- Makeup Boy (voiced by Bretman Rock) is a social media influencer who provides makeup tips for adolescents. His real name is Sebastian Boyd. In season 2, he is shown to be dating Michael Collins.
- Darrius St. Vil (voiced by Chance the Rapper), a boy at a rival middle school who starts dating Dijonay.
- The Chang Triplets (Miyachi, Lydia Look and Haley Tju as Billy, Julie, and Debbie respectively) are three Chinese-American students who attend Willy T. Ribbs. In the original series, Look voiced all three triplets. Here, they have separate personalities and veer away from Asian stereotypes. In the third season, Billy Chang is revealed to be the rapper Young Toddler who appeared in the first season.
- The Darnell Sisters (Mamie voiced by Myra J. and Mary voiced by Bebe Drake) are former rivals of Suga Mama who are now good friends.
- Celia (voiced by Jane Lynch) is another senior friend of Suga Mama.
- Kwame (voiced by Leslie Odom Jr.) is the English teacher at Willy T. Ribbs. He has his class refer to him as "Brother Kwame".
- Igloo Hankins (voiced by Brian Hooks) is a mall cop and amateur detective. In the reboot, he quit being a mall cop to become a shady lawyer. Hooks reprises his role from the original series.
- Ms. Hill (voiced by Tiffany Haddish) is Penny and the gang's substitute teacher and Bobby's prom date, who appears to be homeless. According to her, Suga Mama stole her seat and her corsage, and even came to the prom dinner just to cut Bobby's meat. By the third season, she becomes Penny's homeroom teacher.
- Talia Rogue (voiced by Gabrielle Union) is a fashion designer and the editor-in-chief of Rogue (a parody of Vogue), a fashion magazine that includes sister publications such as Teen Rogue (a parody of Teen Vogue), who is strict and domineering over Penny. She also secretly works as the leader of The 100, an elite spy organization consisting of supermodels. Union previously voiced Sunny Stevens / Iesha in the original series.
- Dr. Lord (voiced by Holly Robinson Peete) is a doctor who helps the Prouds with BeBe's autism. In addition to voicing Dr. Lord, Peete was also credited as a consultant for the episode she appeared in, since her son is also autistic.

=== Guests ===
- Pink-I (voiced by KyLee Evans)
- Lizzo (voiced by herself): Lizzo temporarily replaces LPDZ as the headliner at Snackland. She also gives Penny advice.
- Rob Riggle, Neato Tito, and Iyanna (voiced by himself, Arturo Castro, and Marsai Martin, respectively) are the hosts of a reality show called Crab Barrel, a parody of Shark Tank.
- Lamorne Morris (voiced by himself) is the star of a hip-hop musical based on the life of Benedict Arnold, which parodies Hamilton.
- LaBrea Avanúñez (voiced by Princess Nokia) is the daughter of Melrose who goes to the quinceañera of her cousin, LaCienega.
- Melrose Avanúñez (voiced by Eva Longoria) is the jealous sister of Sunset who insults and degrades guests at LaCienega's quinceañera.
- Ms. Gina (voiced by Tina Knowles) is a hair stylist who helps LaCienega and her friends prepare for LaCienega's quinceañera.
- Kid Capri (voiced by himself) is a DJ who appears at LaCienega's quinceañera party, to replace Papi, but later he is removed and detained by Suga Mama.
- Pa (voiced by Glynn Turman) is the father of Suga Mama who was mean toward her and didn't allow her to enter the rodeo because she was a girl.
- Charlie Towne (voiced by Art Evans): Brother of Suga Mama.
- Charles Towne (voiced by James Pickens Jr., Marcus T. Paulk as a child): Nephew of Suga Mama.
- Myrtle Towne (voiced by Debbie Allen): Stepmother of Suga Mama and cowgirl.
- Man-Man (voiced by D.C. Young Fly): Nephew of Suga Mama.
- Chuck Towne (voiced by Lawrence Hilton-Jacobs): Half-Brother of Suga Mama.
- June Bug (voiced by Lil Nas X): Nephew of Suga Mama who is a guitar player who only wears a cowboy hat, pants, and has a gold tooth, performing with Bobby.
- Quanah (voiced by Wes Studi) is a Native American cowboy and Suga Mama's ex-fiancée, but laws at the time prevented them from doing so.
- Tyee (voiced by Forrest Goodluck) is Quanah's grandson.
- Dominique Dawes (voiced by herself) is an artistic gymnast, Olympic champion, and judge in LaCienega's competition.
- Gabby Douglas (voiced by herself) is an artistic gymnast, Olympic champion, and judge in LaCienega's competition.
- Laurie Hernandez (voiced by herself) is an artistic gymnast, who LaCienega defeats to participate in the Olympics. She also owns JoJo, a kangaroo that was briefly adopted by Oscar and named Zapp.
- Judge Byrd (voiced by Petri Hawkins Byrd) is a daytime television judge whose gimmick is labeling the losers of each suit as "dodos". Byrd was originally the bailiff on Judge Judy.
- Maury Povich (voiced by himself): Povich hosts a version of Maury called "Who's the Daddy?", in which Oscar, Suga Mama, Felix, and Papí appear on to determine if Puff is the father of the blue puppies that La Lupe, the Boulevardezes' dog, birthed.
- Ray Ray Proud, Sr. (voiced by Anthony Anderson) is Oscar and Bobby's country cousin. Anderson reprises his role from the original series.
- Merlin Kelly (voiced by Courtney B. Vance) is Wizard Kelly's father. Much like his son, only the lower half of his face is shown, but he also has a mustache and a Jheri curl.
- Giselle (voiced by Normani) is a pop music artist who was previously in the Soul Vibrations with Oscar, Bobby, and their cousin Ray Ray.
- Ms. Brady (voiced by Tara Strong) is the casually racist history teacher at the School. Strong voiced BeBe and CeCe in the original series.
- Emily (voiced by Storm Reid) is the ghost of a slave girl allegedly owned by Christian A. Smith, Barry's ancestor and founder of the city; only Maya can see her and talk to her. It is initially implied from her diary's abrupt ending that she was killed for trying to celebrate the first Juneteenth in Union territory where it did not yet free the slaves, but at the end her ghost appears as an old woman before departing, implying she was merely forced to hide the diary and lived to old age.
- Lucy Fur (voiced by Janelle James), Betty Davis' nemesis. Her name is a play on "Lucifer".
- Betty Davis (voiced by Sanaa Lathan), an old flame of Oscar's who is revealed to be a spy.
- Noah Doll (voiced by Neil deGrasse Tyson), an android teacher for the Wiz Kids. His name is a play on "Know-It-All".
- Miss Rosa Lee Davenport (voiced by Lynn Whitfield) A former sorority sister of Trudy, and current head official of the Alpha Theta Nu-ooh sorority. She is later revealed to be extremely prejudiced and judgmental to all dark skinned black girls. For example, when Dijonay came to audition for the sorority's beauty pageant, Rosa Lee deliberately rejected her because Dijonay failed the "brown paper bag" test.
- Breyana Dubois (voiced by Adrienne Warren), a noted talk show host who is Maya's biological mother.
- Reverend Haygood (voiced by Kirk Franklin), the preacher and leader of the church choir, previously having appeared in the Season 2 episode "The Camp, the Counselor, the Mole and the Rock".
- Bubba Wallace (voiced by himself)

=== Retired ===
- Sticky Webb is a character on the original series originally voiced by Orlando Brown. He appears in a non-speaking cameo in the first episode flashing a peace sign at his friends as his family drives away to the airport as it is revealed that he is moving to establish himself in another city in Japan due to his father getting a new job. He could have stayed with his cousins if he wanted but the main reason is he finally had enough of Dijonay's obsessive and insane crush on him. Series co-creator Bruce W. Smith stated; "For us, expanding the world sometimes means you lose characters, but you also gain more characters that help grow the show in a direction we feel is necessary for this new version. That's where a lot of our decisions lie." Francis "KG" Leibowitz-Jenkins replaced Sticky as Dijonay's crush until she began a relationship with Darrius St. Vil in season two.

== Episodes ==
Season	Episodes	Originally released	
Season	Episodes	First released	Last released
1	10	February 23, 2022	April 20, 2022
2	10	February 1, 2023	
3	9 (+1 unaired)	August 6, 2025	
4	10	July 29, 2026	

== Production ==
In August 2019, cast member Tommy Davidson stated that The Proud Family would be revived for a third season on Disney+.

On January 1, 2020, the original series began streaming on Disney+, and shortly thereafter Disney executives approached Farquhar and Smith about reviving the series. On February 27, 2020, the show was formally ordered on Disney+. The original cast (minus Tara Strong, due to casting restrictions and Orlando Brown, due to his judicial processes) reprised their roles, and Keke Palmer voiced a new character introduced to the series named Maya Leibowitz-Jenkins, who is a 14-year-old activist. Zachary Quinto and Billy Porter also voice her adoptive parents, Barry and Randall Leibowitz-Jenkins, and EJ Johnson replaced Phil LaMarr as Michael Collins. In July 2021, Canadian studio WildBrain stated that they would be engaging in animation services for the series, while it is produced by Disney Television Animation, a studio not involved with the original series. Smith and Farquhar said that the "show never really went away" and called it the "perfect time to bring back this show". Screen Rant argued that the revival would break down barriers through the inclusion of multicultural families and characters belonging to the LGBTQ+ community.

On September 15, 2021, more cast members were announced, including Asante Blackk as Penny's new boyfriend, Kareem, Artist "A Boogie" Dubose as Maya's gamer brother Francis "KG" Leibowitz-Jenkins, along with returning cast members Raquel Lee Bolleau as Nubia Gross and Marcus T. Paulk as Myron. Additionally, some celebrity guest voices include Lizzo, Lil Nas X, Tiffany Haddish, Lena Waithe, Debbie Allen, James Pickens Jr., Marsai Martin, Jaden Smith, Glynn Turman, Lamorne Morris, Brenda Song, Tina Knowles (whose daughters performed the original show's theme music), Eva Longoria, Al Roker, and Bretman Rock. Guests for season two will include Chance the Rapper, Gabrielle Union, Normani, Leslie Odom Jr., Anthony Anderson, Dominique Dawes, Gabby Douglas, Laurie Hernandez, Jane Lynch, Holly Robinson Peete, Maury Povich, Storm Reid, Courtney B. Vance, and Liana Mendoza. The show also has Aldis Hodge returning as Frankie and Patricia Belcher as Principal Hightower.

On November 12, 2021, it was announced the series was scheduled to be released in February 2022. On January 14, 2022, the series was given a release date of February 23, 2022. Eastwood Wong is the art director for the series, while Calvin Brown, Jr. is co-executive producer and story editor.

Before the show's premiere, Farquhar explained that the show would be more direct in discussing relevant social issues rather than using "coded language" as in the original show. He also explained that the introduction of LGBTQ+ characters is the "biggest change" people can expect to the show. Farquhar revealed that in The Proud Family, they had to use "code to talk about if Michael was gay, to talk about sexuality" and to be "sort of underhanded about it". He said this changed with The Proud Family: Louder and Prouder. The biggest changes to the show were "gender identity, obviously racial identity and quote-unquote wokeness", and said that sexuality can be "sort of in your face with it a lot more", manifesting itself in the storytelling. Smith added that the show has more than "just one gay person...representing the entire LGBTQ+ spectrum" and said that it is "not fair" to only have one LGBTQ character in the series.

On February 17, 2022, Farquhar said that the show would portray more than "one view of Blackness or a Black family." Smith argued that the series is "blazing a path...[in] this animated sphere", saying it has parts of the horror, sci-fi, and Western genres.

On April 18, 2022, Disney+ confirmed the show's second season was in production. It was also reported that the second season would feature guest stars such as Normani, Leslie Odom Jr., Dominique Dawes, Gabby Douglas, Laurie Hernandez, and Maury Povich.

The second season premiered on February 1, 2023, on Disney+ and March 4, 2023, on Disney Channel.

In June 2023, it was announced that the series was picked up for a third season. On July 2, 2025, it was announced that the third season would be released on August 6, 2025. Announced guest stars included Janelle James, Sanaa Lathan, Neil deGrasse Tyson, Lynn Whitfield, Adrienne Warren, Kirk Franklin, and Bubba Wallace. The third season premiered on August 6, 2025.

In June 2025, it was announced the series had been renewed for a fourth and final season, which premiered on July 29, 2026. A holiday special A Proud Family Wizmas was released on November 14, 2026, on Disney+.

== Music ==
R&B singer Joyce Wrice sings the theme song for the series. A digital soundtrack for the series became available on February 25, 2022. Composer, songwriter and producer Kurt Farquhar who composed and wrote the theme song of the original series returns as the songwriter and composer for this series.

"Gas Station Nachos", performed by Bobby Proud (voiced by Cedric the Entertainer) in the episode "Get In", was released as a single on digital music platforms on March 25, 2022, with a lyric video posted to the Disney Music Vevo channel. "I Sold Out, I'm Not a Sellout", from the episode "When You Wish Upon a Roker" and performed by guest star Lamorne Morris, was released similarly on April 1, 2022.

== Reception ==
=== Critical reception ===
According to review aggregator Rotten Tomatoes, 100% of 6 critics gave the series' first season a positive review, with an average rating of 7.50/10.

Lapacazo Sandoval of the Los Angeles Sentinel said the series is filled with "sparkling dialogue" and "colorful colloquialisms" known by Black households. Jessica Curney of The Michigan Daily said that the show "doesn't miss a beat" but that those used to the original show may take time getting used to the series due to change in story art and tone. Even so, Curney stated that the show is still wholesome while catering to modern sensibilities, teaching life lessons to viewers, especially the younger generation of viewers. Bustle stated that the series is reason to have a Disney+ subscription, while praising the series for its new characters, changed theme song, and guest stars. Some fans, however, sent the creators near death threats and warned them to not change the theme song from the original series. In contrast, Taylor Lyles of IGN reviewed the first two episodes of the series 7 out of 10, and said the revival retains the charm of the original while focusing on new trends like smartphones, social media influences, and cryptocurrency. They also stated that although attempts at being hip "fell flat", the revival generally makes changes but for the better, while remaining goofy and funny, and shows a "lot of potential."

Leigh Ann Jackson of the New York Times argued that the series revived a "beloved animated series" for a new generation, updating the themes from the original to trends of the 2020s. Stephanie Snyder of Common Sense Media rated the series 4 out of 5 stars and said the series had "life lessons and lots of laughs" which provokes "heartwarming nostalgia" for those who watched the original series. While the animation system, soundtrack, and modern jargon and slang were praised, it was noted that there are stereotypes, but they compel viewers to reflect, and stated that the series offers representation of a Black family on television like its predecessor. Nadira Goffe of Slate criticized the series, calling it "seemingly nostalgia-baiting revamp", voicing disapproval of the changed theme song, dialogue with modern slang, and stated that the series is not for old fans, but for a new audience instead. They also criticized the series for abandoning "many things that made it special" in the first place while praising it for its "beautiful, vibrant, and still entirely in tune" animation.

The second season of the show attracted some controversy for its themes particularly a performance scene which stated that "slaves built this country", advocating present-day reparations, and the season 2 finale episode, entitled "Juneteenth". However, others praised the season for its depiction of autism and Maya's character as adding a "layer of skepticism to the storylines". Rendy Jones of Them said the series "upped the ante" from season one, focusing on "virtually unspoken topics" not touched by other all-ages animation, noting the original series also "dared to air social commentary" pertaining to Black culture, praised the season two finale as a "surprisingly urgent and LGBTQ+-inclusive story", and said the episode will "stand the test of time".

=== Accolades ===
Year	Award	Category	Recipient	Result	Ref.
2022	Children's and Family Emmy Awards	Outstanding Animated Series	The Proud Family: Louder and Prouder	Nominated	
2022	Children's and Family Emmy Awards	Outstanding Casting for an Animated Program	Tatiana Bull, Aaron Drown, David H. Wright III	Won	
2022	Children's and Family Emmy Awards	Outstanding Voice Directing for an Animated Series	Ralph Farquhar, Bruce Smith	Nominated	
2023	Annie Awards	Outstanding Achievement for Voice Acting in an Animated Television/Broadcast Production	Karen Malina White	Nominated	
2023	NAACP Image Awards	Outstanding Animated Series	The Proud Family: Louder and Prouder	Won	
2023	NAACP Image Awards	Outstanding Character Voice-Over Performance (Television)	Billy Porter	Nominated	
2023	NAACP Image Awards	Outstanding Character Voice-Over Performance (Television)	Cedric the Entertainer	Nominated	
2023	NAACP Image Awards	Outstanding Character Voice-Over Performance (Television)	Kyla Pratt	Won	
2023	GLAAD Media Awards	Outstanding Kids and Family Programming – Animated	The Proud Family: Louder and Prouder	Nominated	
2023	Children's and Family Emmy Awards	Outstanding Casting for an Animated Program	Tatiana Bull, Aaron Drown	Nominated	
2024	GLAAD Media Awards	Outstanding Kids and Family Programming – Animated	The Proud Family: Louder and Prouder	Nominated	
2024	NAACP Image Awards	Outstanding Animated Series	The Proud Family: Louder and Prouder	Won	
2024	NAACP Image Awards	Outstanding Character Voice-Over Performance (Television)	Keke Palmer	Nominated	
2024	NAACP Image Awards	Outstanding Character Voice-Over Performance (Television)	Kyla Pratt	Won	
2026	NAACP Image Awards	Outstanding Soundtrack/Compilation Album	The Proud Family: Louder and Prouder	Nominated	
2026	GLAAD Media Awards	Outstanding Kids & Family Programming – Animated	The Proud Family: Louder and Prouder	Nominated	

== Scrapped spin-off ==
In December 2023, Disney Enterprises Inc. registered a new project under the title La Familia Avenúñez which was set to be a spin-off of The Proud Family: Louder and Prouder. The spin-off was set to focus on the characters LaBrea Avenúñez and her mother Melrose Avenúñez which introduced in the episode "Raging Bully" dealing with their extended Latin American family. In August 2026, series writer Ashley Soto Paniagua confirmed, on her Instagram account, that the proposed spin-off had a pilot, written by Silivia Olivas, but was scrapped by Disney. Some speculated it was scrapped due to the online discourse surrounding Primos.
