= Alisa Reyes =

American actress (born 1981)

- Born: February 3, 1981 (age 45)
- Occupation: Actress
- Years active: 1991–present
- Children: 1
- Website: www.alisa-reyes.com

Alisa Adriana Reyes (born February 3, 1981) is an American actress, best known for three seasons that she appeared on Nickelodeon's All That (1994–97) and providing the voice of LaCienega Boulevardez in the Disney Channel's, The Proud Family (2001–05) and its 2022 revival.

== Career ==
Reyes started modeling at the age of eight, and attended The Professional Performing Arts School, where she focused on musical theatre. She appears in a 1991 episode of Reading Rainbow to review the book I Want a Dog by Dayal Kaur Khalsa. In 1992, she appeared in Mariah Carey's music video for her single "Make It Happen." In 1993, Reyes became one of the original cast members of the Nickelodeon sketch comedy show All That.

After All That, Reyes was then cast in the NBC Saturday morning sitcom One World. For her role in One World she was nominated for "Best Young Actress/Performance in a Saturday Morning TV Program" at both the 1999 and 2000 YoungStar Award awards.

Reyes has also made guest appearances on HBO's Six Feet Under, Lifetime's Strong Medicine, PBS' The American Family, NYPD Blue, and Boston Public.

Reyes also provided the voice of LaCienega Boulevardez in the Disney Channel animated series The Proud Family from 2001 to 2005. She reprised the role in the series continuation The Proud Family: Louder and Prouder on Disney+.

Reyes also worked as a DJ for Playboy Radio on Sirius Satellite Radio and XM Satellite Radio (Channel 99) and as a host for PlayboyU online and on air shows.

== Filmography ==
- Reading Rainbow Herself (1 episode, 1991)
- All That Regular Performer (1994–1997), guest (2019–2020)
- Figure It Out (1997) TV Series Herself/panelist (1997)
- One World Marci Blake (39 episodes, 1998–2001)
- Strong Medicine Sonia (1 episode, 2000)
- Search Party Celebrity Contestant (2 episodes, 2000)
- The Proud Family LaCienega Boulevardez (45 episodes, 2001–2005)
- The Bold and the Beautiful Ginger (1 episode, 2001)
- V.I.P. (1 episode, 2001)
- Spyder Games (2001) Rocio Conejo (unknown episodes)
- Players (formerly Pledge of Allegiance) (2002)
- Boston Public Trina Sanchez (3 episodes, 2002)
- NYPD Blue Luisa Salazar (1 episode, 2002)
- American Family Young Vangie Gonzalez / ... (5 episodes, 2002)
- Passions Syd Valentine (10 episodes, 2002–2003)
- Pledge of Allegiance (aka Red Zone) (2003) Rachel
- ER (1 episode, 2003)
- The Making of A Sight for Sore Eyes (2003) Herself
- Six Feet Under Julie (1 episode, 2004)
- A Sight for Sore Eyes (2004) Laura Sanchez
- Freezerburn (2005) Angie
- Cuts Monica (1 episode, 2005)
- The Proud Family Movie (2005) (TV) (performer: "Together Makes it Better") (voice) LaCienega Boulevardez
- The John Kerwin Show Herself (1 episode, 2005) Herself
- Contradictions of the Heart (2006) Ellen
- Without a Trace Angelina Torres (1 episode, 2006)
- 4-Bidden (2007) Sydney
- The Doorman (2007) (Peter Bogdanovich film) Girl at Yoga Class
- DaZe: Vol. Too (2009) (post-production) as Amy
- My Trip to the Dark Side (2011) Misty Rae
- My Trip Back to the Dark Side (2012) Misty Rae
- Da Jammies (2015) MoMo (voice, season 1)
- The Proud Family: Louder and Prouder LaCienega Boulevardez (2022–2026)
- A Proud Family Wizmas LaCienega Boulevardez (2026)
