= Paula Jai Parker =

American actress

- Born: August 19, 1969 (age 57); Cleveland, Ohio, U.S.
- Education: Howard University
- Occupation: Actress
- Years active: 1992–present
- Spouse: Forrest Martin (m. 2004)
- Children: 1

Paula Jai Parker (born August 19, 1969) is an American actress. She is best known for her supporting roles in the films Friday (1995), Sprung (1997), Why Do Fools Fall in Love (1998), Phone Booth (2002), Hustle & Flow (2005), and Idlewild (2006). Parker is also known for her voice role as Trudy Proud in the Disney Channel animated comedy series, The Proud Family (2001–2005), which she reprised in the 2005 television film The Proud Family Movie, and its 2022 reboot, The Proud Family: Louder and Prouder.

== Early life ==
Born and raised in Cleveland, Ohio, Parker went to Shaker Heights High School but then graduated from Cleveland Heights High School due to racism in Shaker. For college she moved to Washington, D.C. to study at Howard University. After graduating with a Bachelor of Fine Arts degree, she moved to New York City and played a number of clubs. From 1992 to 1993, she performed on the FOX comedy program The Apollo Comedy Hour, filmed live at the legendary Apollo Theater, and later was cast member on the short-lived sketch show, Townsend Television.

== Career ==
In 1995, Parker made her film debut in the F. Gary Gray urban comedy Friday. In the same year, she earned a Cable ACE Award for her role in the HBO anthology presentation, Cosmic Slop. Later that year, Parker returned to television in the WB sitcom, The Wayans Bros. opposite Shawn and Marlon Wayans. Throughout the 1990s, she appeared in several short-lived shows, including CBS sitcom The Weird Al Show (1997), and David E. Kelley's ABC comedy-drama, Snoops (1999).

During the 1990s, Parker had supporting roles in a number of films. She has appeared in the 1995 horror anthology Tales from the Hood, Spike Lee's Million Man March drama Get on the Bus (1996), the urban comedy Sprung (1997), the Jada Pinkett Smith starring romantic comedy Woo (1997), and the Frankie Lymon biography, Why Do Fools Fall in Love (1998). In the early 2000s, Parker co-starred in 30 Years to Life, High Crimes, Phone Booth, and My Baby's Daddy. In 2004, she played a role in the comedy-drama, She Hate Me, and appeared as Ruth Brown in biographical film Ray. Her breakthrough was in the 2005 independent drama Hustle & Flow starring Terrence Howard. She later was cast opposite Howard in musical film Idlewild (2006).

From 2001 to 2005, Parker voiced the matriarch Trudy Proud in the Disney Channel animated comedy series, The Proud Family and its 2005 film The Proud Family Movie. She also played the iutstanding role of Billie Holiday on the episode of Touched by an Angel in 2000, and later guest-starred on The Shield, CSI: Crime Scene Investigation, My Name Is Earl, and The Mentalist. She co-starred in the 2007 thriller film Cover starring Aunjanue Ellis, and in later years worked in low-profile independent movies.

From 2013 to 2014, Parker had a recurring role in the HBO series True Blood during the show's seventh and final season. In 2014, she was cast as one of five leads on the TV One reality series, Hollywood Divas. In 2015, Parker was cast in the recurring roles on the Amazon drama Hand of God, as well as Freeform series, Recovery Road. In August 2016, she released an extended play album entitled "Paula Jai & Friends", which featured the single "Going Down".

== Personal life ==
Parker married Forrest Martin in 2004. The couple met on the set of Hustle & Flow, where Forrest, who had just graduated with a Master of Fine Arts, was working as an intern. She almost passed on shooting the critically acclaimed movie and only took the part at the urging of her manager. They have one son.

== Discography ==
- Paula Jai & Friends (2016)

== Filmography ==
=== Film ===
Year	Title	Role	Notes
1994	Cosmic Slop	Tang	TV movie
1995	Friday	Joi	
1995	Tales from the Hood	Sissy Johnson	
1996	Don't Be a Menace to South Central	Drunk Party Girl	
1996	Get on the Bus	Jamilia	
1997	Sprung	Adina	
1998	Always Outnumbered	Melodie	TV movie
1998	Woo	Claudette	
1998	Why Do Fools Fall in Love	Paula King	
1999	The Breaks	Ann	
2001	30 Years to Life	Stephanie	
2002	High Crimes	Gracie	
2002	Phone Booth	Felicia	
2003	Love Chronicles	Sara	
2004	My Baby's Daddy	Rolonda	
2004	She Hate Me	Evelyn	
2004	Ray	Ruth Brown	
2004	Konsequenz	Baby	Short
2005	Hustle & Flow	Lexus	
2005	The Proud Family Movie	Trudy Parker-Proud (voice)	TV movie
2005	Animal	Reecy	Video
2006	Idlewild	Rose	
2006	The Genius Club	Tatiana	
2007	Cover	Monica Wilson	
2010	Confessions of A Lonely Wife	-	
2011	King of the Underground	Elizabeth Gayle	
2013	When a Woman's Fed Up	Laticious	
2013	Life of a King	Gina Sanders	
2013	Pastor Shirley	Pastor Shirley	
2014	4Play	Linda	
2014	Patterns of Attraction	Desiree Stewart	
2014	Act of Faith	Shartruce	
2014	Assistant Motives	Joyce Miller	
2014	You Me & Her	Karen	Short
2015	The Summoning	Angela	
2016	Last Call at Murray's	Danice	
2016	She's Got a Plan	Rhonda	
2016	Echo Park Blues	CeCe McCoy	Short
2017	The White Sistas	Jordan White	
2018	Taco Shop	Eve	
2018	Hey, Mr. Postman!	Ms. Kelly	
2020	Blinders	Evelyn	
2022	A Miracle Before Christmas	Martha	
2023	Kings of L.A.	Mason	
2023	Sasha Lanes	Ashanti	
2023	The Furry Fortune	June	
2025	Soul of a Sister	Head Therapist	
2025	Don't Hang Up	Elizabeth Holiday	Short
2026	A Proud Family Wizmas	Trudy Parker-Proud (voice)	

=== Television ===
Year	Title	Role	Notes
1992–93	The Apollo Comedy Hour	Herself	Main cast
1993	Townsend Television	Herself	Main cast
1994	Soul Train	Herself/Guest Host	Episode: "CeCe Peniston/Outkast/Tashan"
1994	Roc	Jill	Episode: "No Place Like Home"
1995	Pointman	Udia	Episode: "Silent Auction"
1995–96	The Wayans Bros.	Mia	Guest: Season 1, Recurring cast: Season 2
1997	Riot	Lisa	Episode: "Homecoming Day"
1997	The Parent 'Hood	Sabrina	Episode: "Wendell and I Spy"
1997	The Weird Al Show	Val Brentwood-Gal Spy	Main cast
1997	Cosby	Tanya	Episode: "The Two Hilton Lucases"
1998	NYPD Blue	Cara Wilson	Episode: "Speak for Yourself, Bruce Clayton"
1999	Snoops	Roberta Young	Main cast
2000	Touched by an Angel	Billie Holiday	Episode: "God Bless the Child"
2001–05	The Proud Family	Trudy Parker-Proud (voice)	Main cast
2003	Gadget & the Gadgetinis	Jeanette Sir (voice)	Episode: "The General's Daughter"
2004	The Shield	Desirae	Episode: "Cracking Ice"
2005	Lilo & Stitch: The Series	Trudy Parker-Proud (voice)	Episode: "Spats: Experiment #397"
2005	CSI: Miami	Deana Walters/D-Nasty	Episode: "Shattered"
2006	CSI: Crime Scene Investigation	Julia Beltran	Episode: "Toe Tags"
2007	Side Order of Life	Stargell Grant	Recurring cast
2008	My Name Is Earl	Sylvia	Episode: "Orphan Earl"
2009	Fear Itself	Patty Orwell	Episode: "Something with Bite"
2010	The Mentalist	Astrid	Episode: "Red Sky at Night"
2010	Fish Hooks	Yolanda (voice)	Episode: "Hooray for Hamsterwood"
2011	Funny or Die Presents	Paula	Episode: "Episode #2.6"
2012	Let's Stay Together	Sherry Steele	Episode: "Inspect Me, Inspect Me Not"
2012	The Exes	Amelia	Episode: "How Holly Got Her Groove Back"
2012–19	Family Time	Lori	Guest: Season 1, Recurring cast: Season 2–7
2013	The Soul Man	Drew	Episode: "Bride and Prejudice"
2013–14	True Blood	Karen	Guest: Season 6, Recurring cast: Season 7
2014	Front Seat Chronicles	Rachel	Episode: "See You in Court"
2014–16	Hollywood Divas	Herself	Main cast
2015	Hand of God	Ida Congdon	Recurring cast: Season 1
2016	Recovery Road	Margarita Jean-Baptiste	Recurring cast
2016	Ray Donovan	Sylvie Starr	Recurring cast: Season 4
2016	How to Get Away with Murder	Yvonne	Episode: "It's About Frank"
2017	NCIS: Los Angeles	Ellie	Episode: "Forasteira"
2019	9-1-1	Judith Spivey	Episode: "Triggers"
2019	Black Jesus	Teresa	Recurring cast: Season 3
2019–22	Crown Lake	Headmistress Catherine Merriweather	Recurring cast: Season 1–2, Main Cast: Season 3
2019–23	A House Divided	Stephanie Sanders	Main cast
2020	Criminal Minds	Captain Vivian Paige	Episode: "Under the Skin"
2020	Insecure	Sheryl	Episode: "Lowkey Feelin' Myself"
2020	Etheria	Karen	Episode: "You Me & Her"
2021	Them	Hazel Emory	Recurring cast: Season 1
2021	Queen Sugar	Celine	Recurring cast: Season 6
2021	Colin in Black & White	Aunt Zora	Episode: "Crystal"
2022	Celebrity Family Feud	Herself/Contestant	Episode: "Episode #9.2"
2022	All Rise	Charlene Addison	Episode: "It Ain't Over Till It's Over"
2022	American Gigolo	Diamond	Episode: "The Escape Wheel"
2022–26	The Proud Family: Louder and Prouder	Trudy Parker-Proud (voice)	Main cast
2024	The Block Trilogies	The Host	Recurring cast

=== Music video ===
Year	Song	Artist
2001	"Girls, Girls, Girls"	Jay-Z

=== Documentaries ===
Year	Title
2007	Angels Can't Help But Laugh
2008	So You Want Michael Madsen?
2011	Kiss and Tell: The History of Black Romance in Movie
2011	Mama & Me

== Awards and nominations ==
Year	Awards	Category	Recipient	Outcome
1995	CableACE Award	CableACE Award for Best Actress in a Drama	"Cosmic Slop"	Won
2006	Women Film Critics Circle	Women Film Critics Circle Award for Best Comedic Performance	"Hustle & Flow"	Won
2006	Screen Actors Guild Award	Screen Actors Guild Award for Outstanding Performance by a Cast in a Motion Picture	"Hustle & Flow"	Nominated
2020	Indie Series Awards	Indie Series Award for Best Lead Actress — Drama	"A House Divided"	Nominated
