= The Proud Family =

American animated sitcom (2001-2005)

- Genre: Adventure; Animated sitcom Coming-of-age
- Created by: Bruce W. Smith
- Developed by: Bruce W. Smith; Doreen Spicer
- Voices of: Kyla Pratt; Tommy Davidson; Paula Jai Parker; Jo Marie Payton; Karen Malina White; Soleil Moon Frye; Alisa Reyes; Orlando Brown
- Opening theme: "The Proud Family Theme Song" performed by Solange Knowles and Destiny's Child
- Ending theme: "The Proud Family Theme Song" (instrumental)
- Composers: Kurt Farquhar; Bud'da
- Country of origin: United States
- Original language: English
- No. of seasons: 2
- No. of episodes: 52 (list of episodes)

Production
- Executive producers: Kurt Albrecht; Willard Carroll; Thomas L. Wilhite; Ralph Farquhar; Bruce W. Smith; Calvin Brown Jr.
- Producers: Mercedes J. Sichon; Gillian Higgins
- Running time: 20–22 minutes
- Production company: Jambalaya Studio

Original release
- Network: Disney Channel
- Release: September 15, 2001 – August 19, 2005

Related
- The Proud Family Movie; The Proud Family: Louder and Prouder

The Proud Family is an American animated sitcom created by Bruce W. Smith that premiered on Disney Channel from September 15, 2001, to August 19, 2005. The series centers on the life of the titular family, including the show's main protagonist, Penny Proud, a 14-year-old African-American teenage girl who navigates her adolescence while dealing with her friends and family. Episodes deal with Penny discovering her boundaries and struggling with family relationships and peer pressure. Penny has strong relationships with her entrepreneurial father Oscar Proud and her veterinarian mother Trudy Proud, as well as her friends Dijonay Jones, LaCienega Boulevardez, Zoey Howzer, and Sticky Webb.

Bruce W. Smith previously directed the 1992 film Bebe's Kids, which was a box office failure. Due to the lack of African-American animated shows, Smith co-founded Jambalaya Studios (Hyperion's division) to create diverse projects. The Proud Family was the first project to be created by the company, starting development in 1998. Smith was inspired to create the series due to the lack of African-American empowerment in animation. Based on his experiences with a middle-class African-American family in Los Angeles, the series featured several elements in animated sitcoms that explored socially relevant themes.

The Proud Family is the first original animated series to air exclusively on Disney Channel. The series premiered on September 15, 2001, as part of the network's programming block Zoog Disney. The series received generally positive reviews for its humor and themes, but received some criticism for its stereotypes. A feature film, The Proud Family Movie, premiered as the series finale on August 19, 2005. A revival, known as The Proud Family: Louder and Prouder, premiered on February 23, 2022, on Disney+.

== Characters ==
=== Main ===
The main characters of The Proud Family (from left to right): Penny Proud, Suga Mama Proud, Puff the Dog, Trudy Proud, Oscar Proud, and BeBe and CeCe Proud (below)

- Penny Proud (voiced by Kyla Pratt) is the main protagonist and the 14-year-old African-American girl who is usually embarrassed by the way her father, Oscar, acts. She enjoys hanging out with her friends, even though they have gotten her into trouble, and left her to face danger by herself many times. She sometimes listens to and always respects her parents, but often caves in to peer pressure. She is also a feminist at times, and is very logical. While in music, she is a very talented singer as shown when she becomes a solo singer (Penne) for Wizard Kelly productions, but quits after missing her past life. Penny is a straight-A student. She's on the football team and the newspaper staff. Penny tried out for cheerleading, but due to having an accident with the stage being converted into a giant CD, LaCienega got the last spot on the cheerleading squad. Penny is also good at reciting poetry and becomes jealous when Dijonay becomes just as good as her. In The Proud Family Movie, Penny turns 16, and she begins to want independence, but her father has issues letting her go. She saves the world and makes up with him, and he finally realizes she's her own person who can make her own decisions.
- Oscar Proud (voiced by Tommy Davidson) is the over-protective father of Penny, BeBe and CeCe, husband of Trudy, younger brother of Bobby and son of Suga Mama, who is characterized as obnoxious and immature, but remained a well-meaning, friendly man whose ambitions and failed attempts at fame and fortune often distract his judgement. Oscar is an amateur entrepreneur despite his job as a telemarketer for the fictional Kelly Inc. He is very hyper, immature, and semi-dimwitted, though considered intelligent in persona in an almost Homer Simpson-esque manner. Oscar owns a business and produces a spiteful brand of snack food called "Proud Snacks." Oscar's biggest weaknesses are money and attractive women.
- Trudy Proud (née Parker) (voiced by Paula Jai Parker) is the veterinarian mother of Penny, BeBe and CeCe, wife of Oscar, daughter-in-law of Suga Mama and sister-in-law of Bobby. She comes from a relatively rich family which includes her sister Diana, who is a best-known actress. She often gives Penny advice when Penny is in trouble while at the same time, she frequently forces Oscar to see the logical side of an argument and to allow Penny to have a voice. Trudy is the second most-sensible member of the family along with Penny, though she can be bossy sometimes. he comes from somewhat of a rich family, her father also being a doctor.
- Suga Mama Proud (voiced by Jo Marie Payton) is Penny, BeBe, and CeCe's hip, wrestling-loving paternal grandmother, Oscar and Bobby's mother and Trudy's mother-in-law who does Tae Bo. She is nice but sassy, and always gets straight to the point when she talks. She can even tease and beat up Oscar, but loves him deep down. Her age is unknown (although in one episode it stated she had a driver's license that expired in 1938), and often made fun of by her son. An event from 20 years ago reveals her looking exactly the same as before. Suga Mama is in love with Papi. On the contrary, Papi despises Suga Mama and often makes offensive remarks about her in the Spanish language which she thinks are compliments, she shows extra amounts of love for her pet poodle, Puff.
- BeBe & CeCe Proud (both voiced by Tara Strong) are Penny's trouble-making 1-year-old baby twin siblings. BeBe is an orange-clad boy with an Afro cut and always has a bottle in his mouth, while CeCe is a girl with the brown bobcut and a pink dress. BeBe and CeCe are namesakes of the gospel music sibling duo, BeBe & CeCe Winans. CeCe is the older twin. They liked Penny very much, but at points played too roughly with her. They are often seen playing with Puff, and most of the time, Puff ends up getting injured. Their voices are similar to Dil Pickles from Nickelodeon's Rugrats, whose voice is by the same actress.
- Puff the Dog (voiced by Tara Strong in the first season, Carlos Alazraqui in the second season and the movie) is Suga Mama's beloved pet poodle. Puff is often tormented by the baby twins, BeBe & CeCe, who play roughly with him. He does, however, show a soft side for Penny.
- LaCienega Boulevardez (voiced by Alisa Reyes) is Penny's Latina-American frenemy and the daughter of Felix and Sunset Boulevardez. She is the most beautiful and popular girl in Penny's school, caring a great deal about her popularity and image along showing a rather nasty-bullying demeanor; Penny in particular rarely gets along with her. Ironically, LaCienega and her mother Sunset are named after La Cienega Boulevard and Sunset Boulevard, two of the Los Angeles area's arterial roads that meet in West Hollywood, California.
- Dijonay Jones (voiced by Karen Malina White) is Penny's gossipy, selfish, but untrustworthy yet enthusiastic and caring, blonde-haired best friend. She wears belly-baring usual attire. She has an obsessive crush on Sticky. She is also liked to speak rumors and has gotten Penny in trouble many times. Dijonay's name is a pun on the name of Best Foods/Hellmann's Dijonnaise, and she has nine younger siblings, all named after spices, seasonings and condiments.
- Zoey Howzer (voiced by Soleil Moon Frye) is timid, shy, and very unsure about her looks and wants to be accepted. Zoey is known for being a follower and Penny often has to talk sense into her. She is a redhead. Her family is German-American.
- Sticky Webb (voiced by Orlando Brown) is Penny's other best friend. He is shown as a cool tech nerd who is able to build or hack any type of device, and after Zoey, he is Penny's most loyal friend. In the movie, he is related to Fifteen Cent. His voice actor did not return in the 2022 revival due to his judicial processes.

=== Supporting ===
- The Gross Sisters (Nubia is voiced by Raquel Lee, Olei and Gina do not speak) are the main antagonists of the series and the half-African Caribbean district bullies who are almost always seen together and who go around stealing money from students, faculty, and parents (including their own). Their names are references to skincare brands Neutrogena, Nivea, and Olay, although their skin is noted to be dry, ashy, and blue.
- Bobby Proud (voiced by Cedric the Entertainer, he did not reprise the role in the movie due to his schedules) is Oscar's older brother, Suga Mama's elder son, Trudy's brother-in-law and Penny, BeBe and CeCe's uncle. He is a fan of groups such as Kool & The Gang among others. Suga Mama favors him over Oscar. He often has Oscar do things that annoy him very often, but lead to Oscar meeting attractive women.
- Wizard Kelly (voiced by Aries Spears) is an incredibly rich and best-known businessman who made his fortune playing professional basketball, whom Oscar greatly admires. He owns several businesses that are named after him, one of which is the Kelly Inc. entrepreneurship where Oscar works. A running gag is that he is very tall, so every picture and video of him shows only up to his neck. He is based on former basketball player Magic Johnson, following a similar life and nomenclature. His wife's name, Ginger Snap, is a play on Johnson's wife Cookie.
- Smart Baby/Red-Nosed Baby (voiced by Ron Glass) is an infant with a droll expression, who enjoys harassing Oscar.
- Felix Boulevardez (voiced by Carlos Mencia) is the neighbor and best friend of Oscar. the father of LaCienega and the husband of Sunset. who owns his own construction company dubbed "Boulevardez Construction". Both Oscar and Felix tend to get in trouble with their wives (although he is noticeably more well-off and successful than Oscar is), yet their friendship is strong. Felix usually gives LaCienega everything she asks for but he has occasionally been pushed to a breaking point.
- Sunset Boulevardez (voiced by Maria Canals) is Felix's wife and Trudy's best friend. She is the mother of LaCienega, a stay-at-home mother who has a lot in common with Trudy, such as complaining about how their husbands get in trouble quite frequently. Unlike Felix, Sunset is more strict with LaCienega as she has little patience for her nasty demeanor. She is also very fond of Penny, much to LaCienega's chagrin.
- Papi Boulevardez (voiced by Alvaro Gutierrez, Kevin Michael Richardson while laughing) is Felix's father, Sunset's father-in-law and Suga Mama's love interest. He is the grandfather of LaCienega. Due to language, he speaks only Spanish and as a result he can get away with insulting Suga Mama. He is known for his signature cackling when after he insults Suga Mama or on some occasions.
- Michael Collins (voiced by Phil LaMarr) is Penny's flamboyant friend and the son of the school coach.
- Dr. Payne (voiced by Kevin Michael Richardson) is the Prouds' doctor, whose build and mannerisms are based on those of Mr. T. Oscar usually suffers painful treatment at his hands.
- Peabo (voiced by Cree Summer) is the Prouds' 9-year-old neighbor.
- Li’l Wiz (voiced by Aries Spears) is Wizard Kelly's son.

== Episodes ==
Season	Episodes	Originally released	
Season	Episodes	First released	Last released
1	21	September 15, 2001	May 24, 2002
2	31	September 27, 2002	August 19, 2005
TV movie		August 19, 2005	

=== Crossover with Lilo & Stitch ===
The Proud Family visit Hawaii in an episode of Lilo & Stitch: The Series, titled "Spats", in which they stay at Jumba & Pleakley's Bed & Not Breakfast and Suga Mama inadvertently activates an experiment that causes spats.

== Production ==
=== Origin and development ===
"Growing in L.A. in a family of six kids, we had some crazy episodes, and I thought it would be a cool idea to bring all that stuff to the screen. I wouldn't say it's edgy the way South Park is edgy–it's edgy but it has a heart."

— Bruce W. Smith on his interview with Charles Solomon, The Los Angeles Times

African-American animator and character designer Bruce W. Smith had previously directed the animated film Bebe's Kids. Based on comedian Robin Harris' stand-up comedy act of the same name, it was the first animated film to be targeted at a Black audience. Released on July 31, 1992, by Paramount Pictures, it was a box-office flop, and it received negative reviews from critics. Since the 1970s, only a few animated series had an African-American focus, including Little Bill in 1999.

In 1999, Smith co-founded Jambalaya Studio with Hyperion Pictures to bring more "racially and ethnically" diverse animated projects to television, movies, and online. The Proud Family was the first project created for Jambalaya Studio, starting development in 1998. Smith was inspired to create the series because he did not see the characters of color represented in animation. Upon creating the series, Smith drew his experiences with a middle-class African-American family in Los Angeles. The conception of the series was also inspired by his fatherhood of three children. In 2000, Smith told Charles Solomon of The Los Angeles Times that he wanted to create a middle-class African-American family that was "not so much Cosby-esque as Cosby-esque with a really interesting slant." The name of the series was inspired by his meeting with co-founder Tom Wilhite when Smith showed him the main characters drawn in a family portrait.

The series' lead character, Penny Proud, was partially based on Smith's daughter Rachel. According to Smith in 2001, he saw the series as an instructional video to his daughter. Oscar's mother, Suga Mama, was named after Smith's mother, Mary, who disliked being called "grandma". His mother's personality traits were also included for the character, including her "bold spirit". Oscar and Trudy Proud were based on Smith and his wife Denise. Papi Boulevardez's physical appearance was inspired by Cesar Romero as the Joker in Batman (1966).

=== Casting ===
Kyla Pratt was cast as the lead character Penny Proud. At the time, Pratt identified with her character's personality traits because they both "[knew] when to be sweet and when to have a little attitude", and they both liked being a "regular kid", "going to school", and "work[ing] [their] own way". Pratt also related to the episodes, stating that they taught her how to "deal with things that happened [in the episodes]." Pratt recorded dialogue for the series on days when she was not rehearsing and taping for One on One. Soleil Moon Frye, best known as the title character on the '80s sitcom Punky Brewster, was cast as Zoey Howzer. Describing the character as a "wonderfully fun and cute and crazy little character", Frye told TVData Features Syndicate that she was "having fun playing [her character]".

=== Writing ===
Featuring several conventions in every animated sitcom with socially-relevant themes, Smith wanted to create "something for the audience to laugh at" and give them "something to take away and be proud in terms of what [Black] culture represents." Although essentially an animated sitcom, Smith set up as an action-oriented show and included things that would be impossible for a live-action sitcom. Smith cited the first-season episode "I Had a Dream" as one of the examples, stating that the premise is similar to Back to the Future, and the premise would not be done in a "live-action half hour" show. According to TVData Features Syndicate, the dialogue included a "hip-hop vocabulary primer", and the series blended classic family themes from shows like The Simpsons with coming-of-age elements reminiscent of The Cosby Show and Canadian drama Degrassi Junior High.

=== Animation and design ===
In terms of design, Smith wanted the colors to "create a harmony" without "ghetto hues" for a mainstream look.

== Themes ==
Due to few pitches of all cartoons featuring African-Americans, The Proud Family is one of the few animated kids shows that featured an African-American protagonist and one of the few animated sitcoms to feature African-Americans as lead characters. Dealing with themes of bullying, rumors, responsibility, and others, The Proud Family highlighted the importance of prejudice, stereotyping, and culture differences. With universal themes rooted in the African-American culture, The Proud Family was considered "groundbreaking" for television due to its depiction on an African-American family in their day-to-day lives. According to Michael Mallory of The Los Angeles Times, the series was also addressing the "diversity issue" more effectively than in primetime television at the time of publishing. Smith told Mike Duffy of Detroit Free Press that the series is a "celebration [and inclusion] of all cultures." Ben Hooper of TVData Features Syndicate commented that while several animated shows deal with "multicultural issues", The Proud Family "keeps it real–er, skews closer to reality–by presenting a multiracial cast of characters with which tweens in culturally diverse schools can identify." Gerald Raiti of Kidscreen recalled that although the series is a satire of family life, it was "[communicating] to children of all races."

The series also had themes of African-American history and liberation. The first-season episode "I Had a Dream" experienced the importance of Black History Month and the life of a black person in the 1950s. In the episode, Penny encountered racism and segregation after she time-traveled to the year 1955. According to Smith on the holiday-themed episode "Seven Days of Kwanzaa", he implied Kwanzaa as the "true meaning of [December]", and he stated that "Kwanzaa is about someone leading a purposeful life, [and] it ties in with what we feel the Christmas spirit is about: family, giving, unity, purpose."

== Broadcast ==
In January 1999, Animation World Network announced that Nickelodeon commissioned production for The Proud Family. Although The Los Angeles Times implied that The Proud Family was picked up by Disney Channel on November 19, 2000, Variety officially announced that Disney Channel was preparing The Proud Family for its lineup on March 26, 2001. The series' first episode, "Bring It On", premiered on September 15, 2001, on Disney Channel. The show ran for two seasons and was followed by the 2005 film, The Proud Family Movie, which ended the series.

=== Reruns ===
On August 31, 2002, The Proud Family began airing in reruns on ABC as part of Disney's One Saturday Morning. Two weeks later, Disney's One Saturday Morning would be rebranded as ABC Kids where The Proud Family continued airing until September 2, 2006, when it was removed from the lineup. The series was shown on Disney Channel as part of Disney Replay on October 1, 2015, and aired again on December 24, 2015, with the episode, "Seven Days of Kwanzaa". In December 2018, the episode was part of a holiday live stream on Disney Channel's YouTube channel. It also aired on Toon Disney until February 6, 2009, just six days before the channel was relaunched as Disney XD, along Paramount Skydance-owned BET in 2008 and Centric in 2010.

=== International ===
The Proud Family aired on now-defunct Family Channel in Canada. In Jamaica, it aired on TVJ. In the United Kingdom, the series aired on ITV in 2002 as part of the network's Saturday morning Diggin' It show. The series has also aired on several international Disney Channel stations.

=== Streaming ===
As of September 2020, the series is available for purchase on the iTunes Store, Amazon Prime Video, and Google TV. The series became available to stream on Disney+ on January 1, 2020.

== Home media ==
To celebrate the show's 20th anniversary, Walt Disney Studios Home Entertainment released a 7-disc complete collection that includes the entire show for the first time ever on DVD, along with The Proud Family Movie and Shorties on March 15, 2022.

== Music ==
The Proud Family

Soundtrack album by Various artists
- Released: April 20, 2004; August 16, 2005 (re-release)
- Genres: Hip hop; soul; R&B
- Label: Walt Disney/Universal

The soundtrack album for the show is a combination of both original songs by the characters in the show, songs by popular R&B music artists such as Alicia Keys, India.Arie, and Solange & Destiny's Child (who perform the theme song), and classic soul music from artists such as Aretha Franklin and the O'Jays.

=== Track listing ===
1. "The Proud Family Theme Song" - Solange & Destiny's Child
2. "Enjoy Yourself" - L.P.D.Z.
3. "Peanut Butter Jelly Time" - Buckwheat Boyz
4. "Respect" - Aretha Franklin
5. "Fallin'" - Alicia Keys
6. "Throw Em Up" - Lil' Romeo
7. "Good Times" - Chic
8. "Bobby's Jam: So Dysfunkshunal" - Cedric the Entertainer
9. "Video" - India.Arie
10. "More Love" - Smokey Robinson & the Miracles
11. "We Are Best Friends" - L.P.D.Z.
12. "Use ta Be My Girl" - the O'Jays
13. "It's All About Me" - Penny Proud
14. "You'll Never Find Another Love like Mine" - Lou Rawls

== Reception ==
=== Critical response ===
The series received generally positive reviews from critics. Mark Sachs of The Los Angeles Times commented that it is a "fresh-feeling animated show geared teens". Betsy Wallace of Common Sense Media said that the series is a mix of positive role models, zany comedy, and stories which are relatable, while questioning the political point of having a famous basketball player own everything in town. Nadira Goffe of Slate praised the series for its humor aimed at viewers, with clear inspirations for in-universe shows and references, and for starring a cast of Black teenagers of "all different shades and family makeups." Todd Coleman of TelevisionWeek also praised the series for its "flat-out hilarious" humor, describing the series as "hip in style".

Screen Rant praised the series for having a "perfect balance" of being hilarious and heartfelt while breaking barriers with its "BIPOC representation" behind the scenes and in the show itself. Romper acclaimed the series for positive representation of Black families, changing the narrative through each episode. HuffPost lauded the series for allowing Black people to see versions of themselves "through expressive and entertaining characters. Leila Etthachfini of Vice Media criticized the show for negative stereotypes of Asian, Muslim, and Black people, but stated that it is "a standout Disney show in many ways."

=== Ratings ===
The Proud Family was a "huge success" when it premiered. During the 2003–04 TV season, the series had an average Nielsen rating of 4.0 for kids 6 to 11.

=== Awards and nominations ===
Year	Award	Category	Nominee(s)	Result	Ref.
2002	NAACP Image Awards	Outstanding Performance in a Youth or Children's Series/Special	Tommy Davidson	Nominated	
2002	NAACP Image Awards	Outstanding Youth or Children's Series/Special	The Proud Family	Nominated	
2002	Artios Award	Best Casting for Animated Voice Over, Television	Eileen Mack Knight	Won	
2003	NAACP Image Awards	Outstanding Supporting Actor in a Comedy Series	Cedric the Entertainer	Won	
2003	NAACP Image Awards	Outstanding Supporting Actor in a Comedy Series	Ving Rhames	Nominated	
2003	NAACP Image Awards	Outstanding Performance in a Youth/Children's Series/Special	Tommy Davidson	Nominated	
2003	NAACP Image Awards	Outstanding Performance in a Youth/Children's Series/Special	Jo Marie Payton	Nominated	
2003	NAACP Image Awards	Outstanding Performance in a Youth/Children's Series/Special	Kyla Pratt	Nominated	
2003	Casting Society of America	Best Casting for Animated Voice Over, Television	Eileen Mack Knight	Won	
2003	30th Annie Awards	Outstanding Achievement in an Animated Television Production Produced for Children	The Proud Family	Nominated	
2003	30th Annie Awards	Outstanding Character Design in an Animated Television Production	Shannon Tindle for episode "Forbidden Date"	Nominated	
2003	30th Annie Awards	Outstanding Directing in an Animated Television Production	Bruce W. Smith for episode "A Hero For Halloween"	Nominated	
2003	30th Annie Awards	Outstanding Writing in an Animated Television Production	James E. West II & T. Smith III for episode "I Had A Dream"	Nominated	
2004	31st Annie Awards	Outstanding Character Design in an Animated Television Production	Shannon Tindle for episode "Culture Shock"	Nominated	
2004	BET Comedy Awards	Outstanding Animated Series	The Proud Family	Won	
2004	NAACP Image Awards	Outstanding Performance in a Youth/Children's Series/Special	Tommy Davidson	Nominated	
2004	NAACP Image Awards	Outstanding Performance in a Youth/Children's Series/Special	Kyla Pratt	Nominated	
2004	2004 Kids' Choice Awards	Favorite Cartoon	The Proud Family	Nominated	
2004	20th TCA Awards	Outstanding Children's Programming	The Proud Family	Nominated	
2004	NAMIC Vision Awards	Best Comedic Performance	Jo Marie Payton	Nominated	
2004	NAMIC Vision Awards	Best Comedic Performance	Paula Jai Parker	Nominated	
2004	NAMIC Vision Awards	Children's	"Tween Town"	Nominated	
2005	36th NAACP Image Awards	Outstanding Performance in a Youth/Children's Series/Special	Tommy Davidson	Nominated	
2005	36th NAACP Image Awards	Outstanding Performance in a Youth/Children's Series/Special	Jo Marie Payton	Nominated	
2005	36th NAACP Image Awards	Outstanding Performance in a Youth/Children's Series/Special	Kyla Pratt	Nominated	
2005	NAMIC Vision Awards	Best Children's	The Proud Family	Won	
2005	NAMIC Vision Awards	Best Comedic Performance	Jo Marie Payton	Nominated	

=== Legacy ===
Entertainment Weekly ranked The Proud Family as sixth on greatest Disney Channel Original Series, stating that the series was a "warm tale of a family sticking together despite all their frustrations." The Proud Family was ranked at No. 17 on TV Guide's ranking of "The Best Disney Channel Shows". The Proud Family was included on MTV's "15 Disney Channel Series We Wish We Could Watch Again".

== Other media ==
=== Television film ===
On May 30, 2005, The Proud Family Movie was announced as part of the "tween-targeted fare" on Disney Channel. The film premiered as a Disney Channel Original Movie on August 19, 2005, on Disney Channel. The film served as the series finale for show's original run. All of the cast reprised their roles for the film. The film featured Omarion as 15 Cent (Sticky's cousin) and Arsenio Hall as Dr. Carver.

=== Video game ===
A video game based on the series was developed by Gorilla Systems and published by Buena Vista Games for the Game Boy Advance. The game was released in November 2005 in North America, a few months after the show ended. In the game, Penny works a variety of jobs to raise money so she can afford to buy her parents a T.H.A.N.G. (Total Home Automated Necessity Gizmo) for their upcoming wedding anniversary. Each job plays out as a minigame. Aside from Penny and her parents, other characters from the series also appear in the game, including Penny's friends and Suga Mama. GameDaily and GameZone both rated the game 8 out of 10.

=== Reboot ===
In August 2019, Tommy Davidson stated that The Proud Family would be revived for a third season on Disney+. On January 1, 2020, Disney executives approached Farquhar and Smith about reviving the series. On February 27, 2020, it was announced that a reboot of the series has been ordered on Disney+. The original cast (minus Tara Strong due to casting's race restrictions and Orlando Brown due to his judicial processes) returned to reprise their roles. Keke Palmer joined to voice a new character named Maya Leibowitz-Jenkins. It premiered on Disney+ on February 23, 2022.
