= Kyla Pratt =

American actress (born 1986)

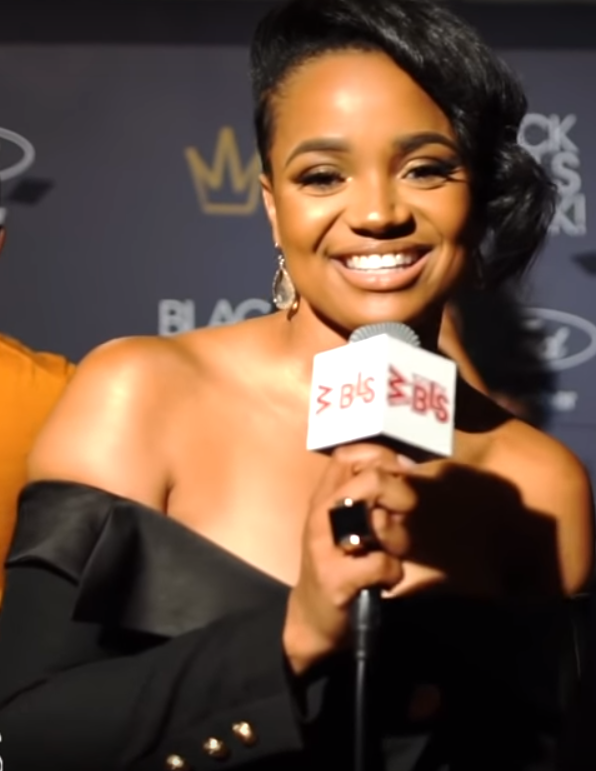
- Pratt at the Black Girls Rock! red carpet in 2018
- Born: Kyla Alissa Pratt; September 16, 1986 (age 40); Los Angeles, California, U.S.
- Occupation: Actress
- Years active: 1993–present
- Partner(s): Danny Kirkpatrick (2008–present; engaged)
- Children: 2

Kyla Alissa Pratt (born September 16, 1986) is an American actress. She is best known for providing the voice of Penny Proud in the first Disney Channel animated series, The Proud Family, its 2005 film adaptation and its revival The Proud Family: Louder and Prouder, and for portraying Breanna Latrice Barnes in UPN's One on One. She is also known for playing Maya Dolittle in the Dr. Dolittle franchise reboot from 1998 to 2009. From 2012 to 2014, she appeared in the series Let's Stay Together. She was formerly a part of VH1's Black Ink Crew: Compton and the cast of Call Me Kat on Fox.

== Early life ==
Kyla Alissa Pratt was born on September 16, 1986, to Kecia Pratt, a school teacher, and Johnny McCullar, a basketball player. She is the oldest of five children.

== Career ==
=== Acting career ===
Pratt began acting at age eight, appearing in commercials for an interactive computer game and Nike. In 1997, she appeared in an episode of Walker, Texas Ranger titled "The Neighborhood", in which she portrayed Kyla Jarvis, a ten-year-old girl who miraculously recovers after accidentally being shot in a drive-by shooting in her gang-ridden neighborhood, and reveals that she saw heaven where she met a guardian angel who gives her an important mission from God. With Walker's help, Kyla Jarvis spreads the angel message of faith and love, uniting her local community into helping clean up their neighborhood and end the gang violence plaguing it. She appeared in an episode of Friends, followed by roles in Smart Guy, So Weird, Sister, Sister, Family Matters, Lizzie McGuire, Moesha, and The Parkers.

In 2001, she won the role of Breanna Barnes in the UPN series One on One (2001–2006). During the run of One on One, Pratt also voiced Penny Proud, the lead character in the Disney Channel animated series The Proud Family. She later voiced the character for The Proud Family Movie in 2005. In addition to television roles, Pratt has appeared in several feature films, including Love & Basketball (2000) and Fat Albert (2004). She played Maya Dolittle in Dr. Dolittle (1998) and Dr. Dolittle 2 (2001), both of which starred Eddie Murphy, and reprised her role as Maya Dolittle (now the lead character) in the direct-to-DVD releases of Dr. Dolittle 3 (2006), Dr. Dolittle: Tail to the Chief (2008), and Dr. Dolittle: Million Dollar Mutts (2009).

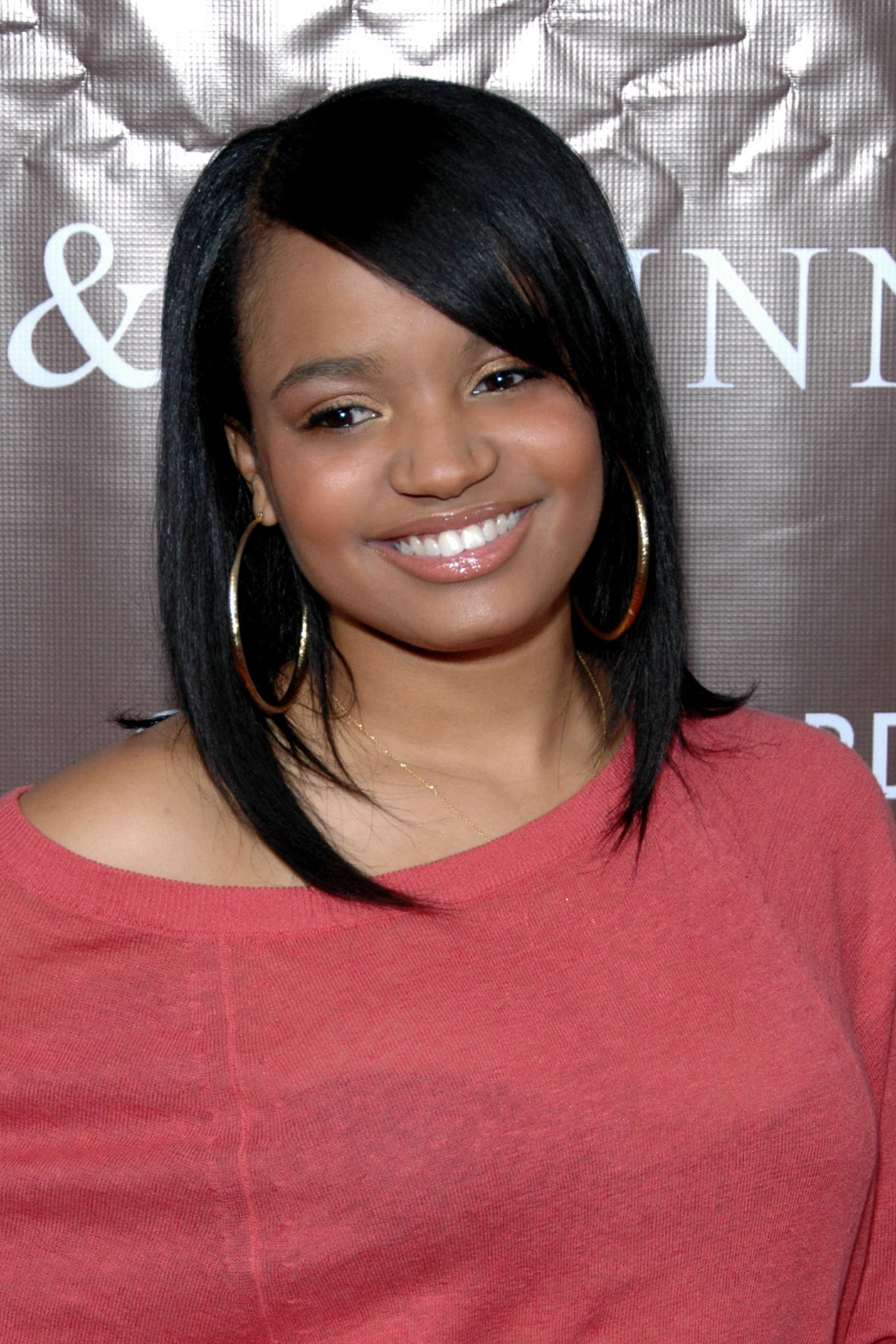
Pratt in 2008

In 2009, Kyla Pratt co-starred alongside Emma Roberts and Jake T. Austin in Hotel for Dogs. Pratt joined the cast of BET's Let's Stay Together in its second season. In February 2014, Pratt was voted #97 on VH1's 100 Greatest Child Stars. In June 2014, she starred alongside Jessica Sula in a Freeform pilot called Recovery Road based on Blake Nelson's novel of the same name. The show debuted on Freeform in January 2016, but was cancelled shortly afterwards, in May 2016.

In 2024, Pratt starred in the film adaptation of The Memo: What Women of Color Need to Know to Secure a Seat at the Table by Minda Harts. The psychological thriller film, titled The Memo, was produced by Valeisha Butterfield’s Seed Media.

In July 2025, it was announced that Pratt would be joining the fourth season of the Fox series, Animal Control, in a recurring role.

=== Singing career ===
As a member of the Disney Channel Circle of Stars, Pratt performed a cover version of "Circle of Life" that appeared on the DisneyMania 2 album. She sang "It's All About Me", for the series soundtrack for The Proud Family, and "A Dream Is a Wish Your Heart Makes" with the Disney Channel Stars. Kyla also sang in the 2019 Lifetime Christmas movie, No Time Like Christmas.

== Personal life ==
Pratt began a relationship with Danny Kirkpatrick, a rapper, songwriter, and tattoo artist, in 2008. On November 17, 2010, the couple welcomed their daughter, Lyric Kirkpatrick. They welcomed another daughter, Liyah Kirkpatrick, on August 5, 2013. Pratt appeared alongside Kirkpatrick on the reality show Black Ink Crew: Compton in 2019.

== Filmography ==
=== Film ===
Year	Title	Role	Notes
1995	The Baby-Sitters Club	Becca Ramsey	
1997	Riot	Jenny Baker	
1997	A Walton Easter	Joanie Potter	TV movie
1997	Mad City	Kid	
1998	Barney's Great Adventure	Marcella Walker	
1998	Dr. Dolittle	Maya Dolittle	
1999	Jackie's Back	Little Jackie Washington	TV movie
2000	Love & Basketball	Young Monica	
2001	Dr. Dolittle 2	Maya Dolittle	
2002	More than Puppy Love	Jae	
2003	Maniac Magee	Amanda Beale	TV movie
2004	The Seat Filler	Diona	
2004	Fat Albert	Doris	
2005	The Proud Family Movie	Penny Proud (voice)	TV movie
2006	Dr. Dolittle 3	Maya Dolittle	Video
2007	Hell on Earth	Keri Diamond/Dumpin	TV movie
2008	Dr. Dolittle: Tail to the Chief	Maya Dolittle	Video
2009	Hotel for Dogs	Heather	
2009	Dr. Dolittle: Million Dollar Mutts	Maya Dolittle	Video
2015	Beauty and the Beat Boots	-	Short
2016	Secret She Kept	Tía Jiles/Kingston	TV movie
2018	Best Baddies	Melody (voice)	Short
2018	The Christmas Pact	Sadie	TV movie
2019	Back to the Goode Life	Francesca Goode	TV movie
2019	No Time Like Christmas	Emma Potter	TV movie
2020	Let's Meet Again on Christmas Eve	Corinne Millbrook	TV movie
2021	The Addams Family 2	Volcano Kid, Book Girl, Festival Kid #1, Peggy (voice)	
2026	Girl in the Cellar	Rebecca	TV movie
2026	A Proud Family Wizmas	Penny Proud (voice)	

=== Television ===
Year	Title	Role	Notes
1993	Where I Live	Brittany	Episode: "Married... with Children"
1995	Living Single	Tracy	Episode: "He Works Hard for the Money"
1995	Guideposts Junction	Mailbox Kid #3	Episode: "Angels, Angels"
1995	The Parent 'Hood	Monica	Episode: "A Kiss Is Just a Kiss"
1996	In the House	Erica	2 episodes
1996	Sisters	Little Girl	Episode: "The Price"
1996	Lois & Clark: The New Adventures of Superman	Little Girl	Episode: "Through a Glass, Darkly"
1996	ER	Lily	Episode: "Take These Broken Wings"
1996	The Show	Nia	Episode: "The Last Episode of the Season and Them"
1996	Public Morals	Gretel Ruggs	Episode: "The Cornflower Cover"
1996	Touched by an Angel	Annie	Episode: "The Journalist"
1996	Friends	Charla Nichols	Episode: "The One Where Rachel Quits"
1997	Family Matters	Kelsey Webster	Episode: "Le Jour d'Amour"
1997	Walker, Texas Ranger	Kyla Jarvis	Episode: "The Neighborhood"
1997	Smart Guy	Lillie	Episode: "Baby, It's You and You and You"
1998	The Pretender	Tracy Johnson	Episode: "Gigolo Jarod"
1998	Smart Guy	Brandi	2 episodes
1998	Any Day Now	Birdie	Episode: "You Shoulda Seen My Daddy"
1999	Becker	Keisha	Episode: "Limits & Boundaries"
1999	So Weird	Kamilah Simmonds	Episode: "Lost"
1999	Sister Sister	Basketball Player	Episode: "The Road Less Traveled"
1999	The Parent 'Hood	Monica	Episode: "To Kiss or Not to Kiss"
1999	Moesha	Patricia	Episode: "The Crush"
2000	The Parkers	Shaquilla	Episode: "Bad to the Bone"
2000	The Hughleys	Kenyatha	Episode: "The Thin Black Line"
2000	Moesha	Sabrina Wilson	Episode: "Netcam"
2000	Strong Medicine	Donna Jenkins	Episode: "Brainchild"
2001	Lizzie McGuire	Brooke Baker	Episode: "Gordo and the Girl"
2001–2005	The Proud Family	Penny Proud	Voice; main cast
2001–2006	One on One	Breanna Latrice Barnes	Main cast
2002	Super Short Show	Herself	Episode: "The Proud Family Movie/That's So Raven: Raven's House Party: 1"
2004	Veronica Mars	Georgia	Episode: "The Wrath of Con"
2005	Dr. Phil	Herself	Episode: "Dr. Phil & Dr. Bill"
2005	Lilo & Stitch: The Series	Penny Proud	Voice; episode: "Spats: Experiment #397"
2012	The Mentalist	Juliana McVie	Episode: "Black Cherry"
2012–2014	Let's Stay Together	Crystal Whitmore	Main cast (seasons 2–4)
2013	L.A. Hair	Herself	Episode: "Don't Mess With My Mama"
2015	The Soul Man	Alicia	Episode: No Weddings and Ten Funerals
2016	Recovery Road	Trish Collins	Main cast
2018	In the Cut	LaShantay	Episode: "The Ring Bearer"
2019	Black Ink Crew: Compton	Herself	Supporting cast (season 1)
2020	Insecure	Dina	Episode: "Lowkey Done"
2021	Duncanville	Allison	Voice; 2 episodes
2021	Bronzeville	Maisie	Episode: "3,5,11,29"
2021	We Stay Looking	Keisha	Episode: "Wet and Alone"
2021–2023	Call Me Kat	Randi	Main cast
2022	Celebrity Family Feud	Herself/Contestant	Episode: "Salt-N-Pepa vs. The Proud Family and Bel-Air vs. Saved by the Bell"
2022	The Wheel	Herself/Animated Movies Expert	Episode: "Fish N' Chips & Gold Medal Flips"
2022	A Black Lady Sketch Show	Edge Donor	Episode: "Save My Edges, I'm a Donor!"
2022	Tales	Stephanie	Episode: "Survival of the Fittest"
2022–2026	The Proud Family: Louder and Prouder	Penny Proud	Voice; main role
2023	Fantasy Island	Peaches	Episode: "Peaches and the Jilted Bride"
2023, 2025	Chibiverse	Penny Proud	Voice; 2 episodes
2025	Special Forces: World's Toughest Test	Herself	Contestant on season 3
2025–2026	The Chi	Angie	Recurring role (seasons 7–8; 9 episodes)
2025–present	Animal Control	Daisy Cannon	Recurring role (seasons 4–5)

=== Music videos ===
Year	Title	Artist
2003	"What a Girl Wants"	B2K
