= Jo Marie Payton =

American actress (born 1950)

- Born: August 3, 1950 (age 76); Albany, Georgia, U.S.
- Other names: Jo Marie Payton-France; Jo Marie Payton-Noble
- Education: Albany State University
- Occupation: Actress
- Years active: 1978–present
- Spouse: Rodney Noble (m. 1993; div. 1998)
- Children: 1

Jo Marie Payton (born August 3, 1950) is an American actress. She portrayed Harriette Baines Winslow on the ABC/CBS sitcom Family Matters (1989–1997), a role she originated on its forerunner series Perfect Strangers. From 2001 to 2005, Payton provided the voice for Suga Mama Proud (Penny Proud's paternal grandmother) on Disney Channel's animated series The Proud Family and reprised the role in the 2005 television film The Proud Family Movie and also on Disney+'s revival The Proud Family: Louder and Prouder. The role earned her an NAACP Image Award nomination in 2005. Payton also had a recurring role as the personal assistant to Gregory Hines' character, Ben Doucette (Will Truman's boss), during season two of Will & Grace (1999–2000).

== Early life and education ==
Jo Marie Payton was born on August 3, 1950, in Albany, Georgia. Sometime during her early teens, her family relocated to Opa-locka, Florida. Payton attended high school at North Dade Jr./ Sr. High School and later graduated from Miami Carol City Senior High School in 1968. Continuing her education, Payton graduated from Albany State University. She then moved to California, where she joined the national touring company of the musical Purlie.

== Career ==
Payton's big break came when she was cast as Harriette Winslow, the elevator operator on the ABC sitcom Perfect Strangers, in 1987. Her performance was so well received by audiences that she was given her own sitcom, Family Matters, in 1989. Continuing her character Harriette Winslow from Perfect Strangers, she played a mother in a middle-class black family living in Chicago, Illinois. Payton left Family Matters partway through its final season, appearing for the last time on December 19, 1997, during increasing tension between her and star Jaleel White (the two nearly came to blows and had to be physically separated during Payton's penultimate episode). Harriette Winslow was played by Judyann Elder in the show's remaining eight episodes.

In 2002, Payton appeared on the "TV Moms" episode of the Anne Robinson version of The Weakest Link, and was the third one voted off. In 2003, Payton and her daughter appeared on a Mother's Day episode of Lingo, playing against fellow TV mom Meredith Baxter and her daughter. Baxter and her daughter won. In 2005, Jo Marie Payton provided the voice of Suga Mama in The Proud Family Movie. Her other television credits include Desperate Housewives, Reba, Girlfriends, Wanda at Large, Judging Amy, The Parkers, Will & Grace, The Hughleys, 7th Heaven, Moesha, The Jamie Foxx Show, 227, Silver Spoons, Small Wonder and The New Odd Couple. She also appeared as Mama in the Canadian television miniseries The Rev.

In 2005, Payton co-hosted the 15th Annual NAACP Theatre Awards with Glynn Turman. In August 2009, she guest starred on Meet the Browns as Shirley Van Owen. Payton then hosted her own show, Second Chance with Jomarie Payton, on the Hometeam Network. In 2012, Payton appeared in the GMC TV special From This Day Forward.

In 2017, Entertainment Weekly reunited the cast of Family Matters for an exclusive photo shoot and interview. During the interview, Payton said that she and White had a long talk, resolved any past animosity and reconciled.

=== Other ventures ===
In 2004, in an effort to help raise funds for Virginia Union University, Payton wrote letters to alumni urging them to donate money in amounts from $18.65 to $186,500, in honor of the university's founding date of 1865.

== Personal life ==
Until 1998, Payton was married to Rodney Noble.

== Filmography ==
=== Film ===
Year	Title	Role	Notes
1978	The Plant Family	Geneva	Television film
1980	The Hollywood Knights	Black Lady	
1981	Body and Soul	Lady in the Ring	
1983	Deal of the Century	Baptist #1	
1986	Crossroads	Jookhouse Woman #2	
1987	Disorderlies	Kool's Mother	
1988	Colors	Recreation Center Woman #2	
1989	Troop Beverly Hills	Saleswoman	
2001	Enchos of Enlightenment	Paul's Wife	
2002	In the Eyes of Kyana	Olivia	
2004	Gas	Loretta	
2005	The Proud Family Movie	Suga Mama Proud (voice)	Television film
2005	The Rev	Mama	Television film
2011	The Beach Chronicles AGX P2	Mothunevis Omaph	Short
2012	The Beach Chronicles AGX	Mothunevis Omaph	Short
2012	From This Day Forward	Elena	Television film
2015	Dangerous Lessons	Linda	Television film
2015	The Flight Before Christmas	Marie	Television film
2016	Jericho	Maebell	
2016	54:17	Violet	
2017	A Warrior's Path: Alpha	Essie	Short
2018	The Little Mermaid	Lorene	
2018	Christmas Made to Order	Rachel	Television film
2019	The Beach Bum	Judge	
2020	A Very Charming Christmas Town	Estelle	Television film
2023	Momma Said Come Home for Christmas	Dolly Roundtree	
2026	A Proud Family Wizmas	Suga Mama Proud (voice)	

=== Television ===
Year	Title	Role	Notes
1977–1978	Redd Foxx	Various	7 episodes
1982–1983	The New Odd Couple	Mona	4 episodes
1983	Teachers Only	Yolanda	Episode: "It's My Party and I'll Cry If I Want To"
1986	Small Wonder	Meter Maid	Episode: "Here Comes the Judge"
1986–1987	Silver Spoons	Marie	6 episodes
1987	227	Mrs. Herman	Episode: "The Handwriting on the Wall"
1987	The Slap Maxwell Story	Bavaria	Episode: "Episode #1.1"
1987–1989	Perfect Strangers	Harriette Winslow	Main cast; 33 episodes
1988	Frank's Place	Mrs. Ross	Episode: "The Recruiting Game"
1989	Small Wonder	Sergeant Pepper	Episode: "The Jailbirds"
1989–1997	Family Matters	Harriette Winslow	Main cast; 204 episodes
1996	Moesha	Valerie Shaw	Episode: "A Concerted Effort: Part 1"
1998	The Jamie Foxx Show	Janice King	Episode: "Just Don't Do It"
1999	Moesha	Mrs. Campbell	4 episodes
1999–2000	Will & Grace	Mrs. Freeman	5 episodes
2000	7th Heaven	Sharon Peacock	Episode: "Liar, Liar"
2000	City of Angels	Helen	Episode: "Saving Faces"
2001–2005	The Proud Family	Suga Mama Proud (voice)	Main cast; 52 episodes
2002	The Hughleys	Satin Fontaine	Episode: "Bored of the Rings"
2002	The Parkers	Ms. Campbell	Episode: "It's Showtime"
2003	Judging Amy	Mrs. Kahn	Episode: "Ex Parte of Five"
2003	Wanda at Large	Mrs. Hawkins	Episode: "Hurricane Hawkins"
2004	The Big House	Mrs. Jenkins	Episode: "Almost Touched by an Angel"
2004	Girlfriends	Annette Miles	2 episodes
2005	Lilo & Stitch: The Series	Suga Mama Proud (voice)	Episode: "Spats"
2005	Reba	Grandma Ruby	Episode: "No Good Deed"
2006	Desperate Housewives	Charlene	Episode: "Thank You So Much"
2009	Meet the Browns	Shirley	Episode: "Meet the Gold Digger"
2010	The Glades	Remelle	Episode: "Mucked Up"
2013	The Rev	Isabelle Starr	Main cast; 4 episodes
2015	Chopped	Herself/Contestant	Episode: "Sitcom Moms"
2015–16	Mann & Wife	Lorraine Mann	Main cast; 20 episodes
2019	Blaze and the Monster Machines	Grandma Ninja (voice)	Episode: "Ninja Soup"
2022–2026	The Proud Family: Louder and Prouder	Suga Mama Proud (voice)	Main cast; 32 episodes
2023–2025	Chibiverse	Suga Mama Proud (voice)	2 episodes
2025	Invincible	Warden (voice)	Episode: "This Was Supposed to Be Easy"
2025	Theme Song Takeover	Suga Mama (voice)	Episode: "Suga Mama Takes Over The Proud Family Theme Song!"
2025	Miss Governor	Cleo Dunkerman	Main cast; 16 episodes
