= Woo (film) =

- Theatrical release poster
- Directed by: Daisy von Scherler Mayer
- Written by: David C. Johnson
- Produced by: Beth Hubbard; Michael Hubbard
- Starring: Tommy Davidson; Jada Pinkett Smith; Dave Chappelle; Paula Jai Parker; LL Cool J; Darren Heath; Duane Martin
- Cinematography: Jean Lépine
- Edited by: Janice Hampton; Nicholas Eliopoulos
- Music by: Michel Colombier
- Distributed by: New Line Cinema
- Release dates: May 8, 1998 (United States); September 25, 1998 (United Kingdom); July 2, 1999 (Italy)
- Running time: 84 minutes
- Country: United States
- Language: English
- Budget: $13 million
- Box office: $8,165,984

Woo is a 1998 romantic-comedy film directed by Daisy von Scherler Mayer and starring Jada Pinkett Smith in the title role. Tommy Davidson also co-stars.

== Plot ==
Darlene "Woo" Barnes, an extroverted woman living in New York City, is notoriously talented at turning men into mush. When Woo's psychic friend Celestrial predicts that the man of her dreams is about to enter her life, Woo doesn't believe it is true. Celestrial is convinced that Woo is destined to meet a tall, debonair Virgo. Woo's cousin Claudette and Claudette's boyfriend Lenny plan to spend the night together but find themselves entertaining Woo instead. Lenny begs his best friend Tim Jackson to take Woo out, but the shy, strait-laced, law clerk Tim contrasts the sassy and brassy Woo. The same night, Lenny and Claudette's night goes wrong when his obsession with chicken drives her to be forced to dress up as a sexy but awkward "chicken ho" (he makes her cluck and walk like a chicken) but she is allergic to feathers.

At first, Woo is unconcerned about the matchmaking mismatch, but when told that Tim is a Virgo, she decides it is fate, jumps at the chance, and immediately heads for Tim's apartment. Meanwhile, Tim, who can't believe his luck, goes next door to his neighbor Darryl for tips on romancing women. Darryl supplies Tim with incense, edible body oils, and a tape of sexy songs. When Woo arrives, Tim is completely smitten. Woo, however, discovers that Tim is far from her imagined sexy, spontaneous stud. Seeing through Tim's pseudo-cool act, she humiliates and teases him. They are just about to leave Tim's apartment when Tim is visited by three of his pals: Frankie, Hop, and Romaine. The trio's chauvinistic attitude irritates Woo, so she retaliates and freaks them out by acting insane. Finally, the date gets underway. Woo and Tim arrive at a stuffy Italian restaurant, but Woo's behavior gets them thrown out. They go to a dance club, where Tim is punched out by Woo's ex-boyfriend, whom Woo punches back. Tim repeatedly suffers many other misfortunes, but Woo realizes that Tim is the guy she wants. After Tim gets his car back, it is smashed to pieces. Woo offers to share her car and her life with Tim.

== Cast ==
- Tommy Davidson - Tim Jackson
- Jada Pinkett Smith - Darlene "Woo" Barnes
- Dave Chappelle - Lenny
- Paula Jai Parker - Claudette
- LL Cool J - Darryl
- Darrel Heath - Hop
- Duane Martin - Frankie
- Dartanyan Edmonds - Shakim
- Girlina - Celestrial
- Lance Slaughter - Lamar
- Michael Ralph - Romaine
- Tiffany Hall - Denise
- Foxy Brown - Fiance
- Nicci Gilbert - Crayola
- Aida Turturro - Tookie
- Joanna Bacalso - Stunning Woman
- Lenny Solomon - Violin Player
- Jsu Garcia - Maitre d'
- Philip Akin - Roger Smith
- Natalie Venetia Belcon - Hootchie
- Buddy Lewis - Bartender
- Orlando Jones - Sticky Fingas
- Billy Dee Williams - Himself

== Reception ==
The film was met with negative reviews from critics. It holds a 10% approval rating at Rotten Tomatoes, based on 40 reviews, with an average score of 3.7/10. Derek Armstrong at Allmovie, while giving positive reviews to stars Davidson and Smith's performances, stated that the script was "formulaic", and that the film in general was "not much of a vehicle for its impish starlet." Made on a budget of $13 million, the film grossed $8 million domestically, making it a box-office flop. It was, however, a success when released on home video.

== Soundtrack ==
A soundtrack containing hip hop and R&B music was released on May 5, 1998 through Epic Records. It peaked at #52 on the Billboard 200 and #8 on the Top R&B/Hip-Hop Albums.
