= The Proud Family Movie =

2005 television film directed by Bruce W. Smith

- DVD cover
- Genre: Adventure; Comedy
- Based on: The Proud Family by Bruce W. Smith
- Written by: Calvin Brown, Jr. Ralph Farquhar; John Patrick White; Stiles White
- Directed by: Bruce W. Smith
- Starring: Kyla Pratt; Tommy Davidson; Paula Jai Parker; Jo Marie Payton; Tara Strong; Orlando Brown; Soleil Moon Frye; Jeff Bennett; Alisa Reyes; Omarion; LisaRaye McCoy; Arsenio Hall
- Composer: Frank Fitzpatrick
- Country of origin: United States
- Original language: English

Production
- Executive producers: Bruce W. Smith; Willard Carroll; Ralph Farquhar; Thomas L. Wilhite
- Producer: Chris Young
- Editor: Brandy Hammes
- Running time: 91 minutes
- Production company: Jambalaya Studio

Original release
- Network: Disney Channel
- Release: August 19, 2005

Related
- The Proud Family (2001–2005); The Proud Family: Louder and Prouder (2022–2026)

The Proud Family Movie is a 2005 American animated comedy television film based on the Disney Channel animated series, The Proud Family. It premiered on August 19, 2005, and serves as the finale to the show’s original run. The 2022 The Proud Family revival series Louder and Prouder retcons the events of the film to have been a dream.

== Plot ==
Penny Proud is about to celebrate her sweet 16, and she is excited for herself and her friends to be part of a dance group led by 15 Cent since he is Sticky's cousin. However, when 15 Cent drives Penny home, her father Oscar gets angry when he finds them kissing. Oscar grounds Penny indefinitely and cancels her birthday, which leaves Penny furious and resentful of Oscar.

In the meantime, Oscar manages to create a serum that can make his Proud Snacks tastier, but it instead causes the snack to expand and explode. As he is hauled away following his failed presentation, he protests that his formula has no expiration date, which is overheard by a man named Dr. Carver, who has been trying to create an army of humanoid peanuts but never got his formula stabilized. Plotting to steal the formula, Carver invites the Proud family to his home in Legume Island. Trudy forces Oscar and Penny to go, hoping they will bond in spite of their issues. Upon arrival, the Prouds meet the G-nomes, dwarf-sized creatures made from peanuts.

Carver tries to negotiate obtaining the formula from Oscar, but when Oscar refuses, Carver reveals he has created peanut clones of his family from DNA snatched from them while they were partying. Oscar runs away and tries explaining to his family, but they do not believe him. Meanwhile, the clones get a mix-up when the real Penny comes with them back to the mainland to search for the formula, while her clone remains with the original family. Penny soon enjoys the free life, which was encouraged by the clones, but eventually gets tired of it.

At that moment, a mysterious G-nome leads the Prouds and the Penny clone on a perilous journey to the other side of the island, saying there is someone who can answer their questions. Along the way, the Penny clone proves to be the kind of daughter that Oscar desires: obedient. When they meet the person that the G-nome wanted them to meet, he turns out to be the real Dr. Carver, who explains that the Dr. Carver that they met was actually a clone made of a peanut. Dr. Carver revealed that he created the G-nomes based on his research of peanuts. He created the Carver clone as a means of carrying out his research for the better of humankind, but the Carver clone went sizzling crisp in the sun one day and became evil. Donning a disguise of his original form, the Carver clone took over the island and enslaved the G-nomes, turning Carver's peanut research for evil. This makes Oscar realize that his formula is the key, and he tells the family he had left it in a locket for Penny's birthday, which she opens back home.

With this information, the Penny clone reveals herself by trapping the Prouds and the real Dr. Carver before informing the other clones, who take the formula after revealing their true nature to the real Penny. Realizing what just happened, Penny gathers her friends to head over to Legume Island and rescue her family. However, the Carver clone has already used the formula to create and stabilize his peanut soldier army to conquer the world and has left on an air blimp. Anticipating that this would happen, Carver reveals that he has a container of gas that could instantly turn solid peanuts into peanut butter. Penny takes the container and boards the blimp, intending to release it. Before she is about to, the Carver clone tries to convince her otherwise by offering her a life of complete freedom from her family. Though Penny admits that while she may have a lot of issues with her family (especially Oscar), she refuses the Carver clone's offer and unleashes the gas, melting the peanut soldier army and reverting the Carver clone back into a lifeless peanut.

With the Carver clone's plot foiled, the Prouds are declared heroes by the public, and Oscar gives Penny her birthday necklace before allowing her to attend the dance group with 15 Cent and her friends.

== Cast ==
- Kyla Pratt as Penny Proud
- Tommy Davidson as Oscar Proud
- Paula Jai Parker as Dr. Trudy Proud
- Jo Marie Payton as Charlette "Suga Mama" Proud
- Tara Strong as Bebe & Cece Proud / Cashew
- Orlando Brown as Sticky Webb
- Soleil Moon Frye as Zoey Howser
- Alisa Reyes as LaCienega Boulevardez
- Karen Malina White as Dijonay Jones
- Omarion as 15 Cent
- LisaRaye McCoy as The Choreographer
- Arsenio Hall as Dr. Carver / Bobby Proud
- Jeremy Suarez as Wally
- Carlos Alazraqui as Puff The Dog / Board Member
- Billy West as Board Member / Cab Driver
- Carlos Mencia as Felix Boulevardez
- Maria Canals as Sunset Boulevardez
- Alvaro Guttierez as Papi
- Phil LaMarr as Dr. Carver In Disguise / Board Member
- Aries Spears as Wizard Kelly / Board Member
- Keith David as Bebe Proud Clone
- Kevin Michael Richardson as Mangler Mania / Bobo The Sea Beast
- Masi Oka as The Announcer

== Soundtrack ==
The score to the film was composed by Elika Alvarez, Frank Fitzpatrick and Freddy Sheinfel. The film features new songs written by Frank Fitzpatrick, Jorge Corante, Robyn Johnson, Stephen Anderson, and Jayne Houston, along with covers of calypso songs. The songs featured in the film are:

- "Blowin' Up the Spot" - Omarion (Instrumental only)
- "Right Here" - 'Jhené Aiko'
- "Boom Boom Boom" - Arsenio Hall (Dr. Carver and Bobby Proud)
- "If I Ruled the World" - Arsenio Hall (Dr. Carver and Bobby Proud)
- "Looking for the Perfect Beat" - Performed by Afrika Bambaatta & the Soulsonic Force
- "Together Makes it Better" - Kyla Pratt (Penny Proud), Alisa Reyes (LaCienga Boulevardez), Karen Malina White (Dijonay Jones) and Soleil Moon Frye (Zoey)

== Release ==
The Proud Family Movie premiered on Disney Channel on August 19, 2005, and was released on VHS and DVD on December 6, 2005, with an extended ending.

In his 2020 autobiography, Tommy Davidson, who voices Oscar, revealed that the cast of The Proud Family quit after Disney wanted to pay them the TV series rate for the film instead of the feature film rate, but he convinced them to do the film "for our viewers". In a 2022 interview, Kyla Pratt, who voices Penny, mentioned that she introduced her children to The Proud Family by showing them a DVD of the film since she did not have access to episodes of the series.

The film re-aired on Disney Channel on May 28, 2016, as part of Disney Channel's 100 DCOM Marathon to celebrate the 100th film, Adventures in Babysitting, and again on April 5, 2021, as part of Disney Channel's Monday block DCOM and Dessert.

As of November 12, 2019, the film is available to stream on Disney+ and Prime Video.

The film is also included in the 7-disc complete collection, which includes the show and Shorties to celebrate the 20th anniversary of the series. It was released on March 15, 2022, on DVD.

== Reception ==
Reception to the film was mixed. Nancy Davis Kho of Common Sense Media felt that the film's plot is "so strange" and gave it two out of five stars, saying that parts of the film are slow-moving and that viewers may prefer to watch the "shorter and pithier TV episodes". Although Kho called the film "light on substance", she praised the character traits of the Proud family clones, fast-paced comedic dialogue, and rap music soundtrack. Some were more critical, arguing that the film uses low-rent animation, an unpleasant look, cliches, stereotypes, and offensive characteristics, calling it an "entirely worthless endeavor". In contrast, Entertainment Tonight called the film a "childhood favorite". Bustle recommended the film as one of those to bring you back to your childhood and asked viewers to remember the "peanut dance battle scene". Kareem Gannett of Collider said that while the movie is as "sassy and bold" as the original series, the film is a "mess" in terms of its plot, even though it comes together in the end. Liv McConnell of Teen Vogue said that the movie, like the series, combined "cartoon-level absurdity" with relatable slice-of-life stories. Scholar of African American cinema Debbie Olson criticized the movie for not having "ethnically rich" character designs like Fat Albert and for some stereotypical depictions of Black men, while noting it challenged stereotypes for having all the Black characters be affluent or middle class.

=== Awards and nominations ===
Year	Award	Category	Nominee(s)	Result
2006	36th NAACP Image Awards	Outstanding Performance in a Youth Children's Series or Special	Tommy Davidson	Nominated
2006	36th NAACP Image Awards	Outstanding Performance in a Youth Children's Series or Special	JoMarie Payton	Nominated
2006	36th NAACP Image Awards	Outstanding Performance in a Youth Children's Series or Special	Kyla Pratt	Nominated
