= Bruce W. Smith =

American animator

- Born: Los Angeles, California, U.S.
- Education: California Institute of the Arts (attended)
- Occupations: Animator, character designer
- Years active: 1984–present
- Employer: The Walt Disney Company (1996–present)
- Notable work: Bebe's Kids; The Proud Family; Hair Love
- Children: 3
- Relatives: Elliot Johnson

Bruce W. Smith is an American film and television producer, animator, character designer and film director. He is best known as the creator of Disney Channel's The Proud Family (2001–2005) and Disney+'s The Proud Family: Louder and Prouder (2022–2026). Employed by Disney since 1996, Smith has served as the supervising animator for Kerchak and Baboons & Baby Baboon in Tarzan, Pacha in The Emperor's New Groove, Pearl Gesner in Home on the Range, Dr. Facilier in The Princess and the Frog and Piglet, Kanga and Roo in Winnie the Pooh. His directorial debut was the 1992 animated film Bebe's Kids.

== Early life ==
Smith grew up in Los Angeles, California. At age 10, he made his first animated film based on designs of One Hundred and One Dalmatians. Smith attended the Character Animation program at California Institute of the Arts. He later stated that while at CalArts he became aware of the lack of Black characters in animated films, which motivated him to create his own animated series.

== Early career ==
In 1984, he was the key assistant animator on a TV short of Garfield in the Rough. In 1986, he served as an animator for Pinocchio and the Emperor of the Night, and joined the Walt Disney Studios as an animator for Who Framed Roger Rabbit, as well as other Roger Rabbit shorts produced by the studio. In a 2022 retrospective interview, Smith said that the "big old tree Afro" with lips (when Eddie Valiant enters Toontown) is a caricature of himself that he drew while working on the film.

He was an animator for the Back to Neverland short, Michael & Mickey. He was credited on the 1990s Don Bluth films Rock-A-Doodle and Rover Dangerfield—for which he served as a storyboard artist, character designer, character animator, and sequence director. In 1997, Smith served as a scenic artist for the film The Peacemaker and was an animator for The Indescribable Nth and Garfield in the Rough. He also worked as a character designer for the Fox Kids musical comedy C-Bear and Jamal.

Also in the early 1990s, Smith was selected by produced Reginald Hudlin (House Party, Boomerang) to direct the Paramount Pictures animated film Bebe's Kids. Upon its release in 1992, the film was a box office bomb and saw mixed to negative reviews from critics. In years that followed, he was credited as a character designer for Ted Turner's A Cool Like That Christmas, The Pagemaster, as well as the television series Happily Ever After: Fairy Tales for Every Child.

Smith also served as co-director on the Warner Bros. live-action animated film Space Jam before returning to Disney as supervising animator on such films as Tarzan (Kerchak and Baboons) and The Emperor's New Groove (Pacha).

== Career ==
While working in animation on the feature film side, Smith furthered his interest in television animation by creating The Proud Family for Disney Channel in 2001. Initially pitched to Nickelodeon in 1998, a pilot was created for the network. He co-founded Jambalaya Studios, which worked in conjunction with Willard Carroll's Hyperion Pictures to produce the series, for which he worked on over 50 episodes as well as The Proud Family Movie (2005).

The name of the series, the first venture for Jambalaya Studio, came from something he told his co-founder, Tom Wilhite when he showed him the show's main characters drawn as though they were in a family portrait.

In 2004, he served as a supervising animator for Disney's Home on the Range. That same year, co-created and served as executive producer for the series Da Boom Crew for The WB. Smith later described the series as mixing concepts of Star Wars with Boyz-N-The Hood, and argued that the series tries to recreate the "black experience in animated form." Although 13 episodes were produced, only four of which aired; the series was a commercial failure.

In 2009, Smith returned to the Walt Disney Animation Studios and Duncan Studio Production to supervise 2D animation on The Princess and the Frog—for the character Dr. Facilier—as well as the 2011 film Winnie the Pooh—for the characters Piglet, Kanga and Roo. In addition, he served as the lead animator for the animated short Tangled Ever After. Smith's character design ability led him into visual development for the studio's subsequent projects, namely Wreck-It Ralph and Frozen.

In 2015, he served as part of the senior creative team for the direct-to-TV film Tinker Bell and the Legend of the NeverBeast. In 2018, he served as an animator for Teen Titans Go! To the Movies. In 2019, he directed the short film Hair Love, which won the Academy Award for Best Animated Short Film. In 2019, he worked on the traditionally-animated indie steampunk short series Hullabaloo.

He returned to The Proud Family with the reboot The Proud Family: Louder and Prouder, which began airing on Disney+ in February 2022. This was spurred by the fact that on January 1, 2020, the original The Proud Family series began streaming on Disney+, and shortly thereafter, Disney executives approached Smith and Ralph Farquhar regarding a reviving of the series. On February 27, 2020, the show was formally ordered on the streaming service. Smith concurred with Farquhar, saying that the "show never really went away" and called it the "perfect time to bring back this show." Smith also argued that the series is "blazing a path...[in] this animated sphere," saying it has parts of the horror, sci-fi, and Western genres. The show is rated TV-PG, making this Disney Television Animation's first series to carry the rating.

In December 2020, he and Farquhar signed an overall deal with Disney to further produce television properties. On April 18, 2022, Disney+ renewed The Proud Family: Louder and Prouder for a second season.

== Filmography ==
Year	Title	Credits	Characters
1984	Garfield in the Rough (TV Short)	Key assistant animator	
1987	Pinocchio and the Emperor of the Night	Animator	
1988	Who Framed Roger Rabbit	Animator: Additional Animation	
1989	Back to Neverland (Short)	Key animator	
1989	Tummy Trouble (Short)	Animator	
1989	Vytor: The Starfire Champion (TV Movie)	Animator	
1989	Happily Ever After	Animator	
1991	Michael & Mickey	Animator	
1991	Rover Dangerfield	Storyboard Artist / Character Designer / Character Animator / Sequence Director	
1991	Rock-A-Doodle	Character Animator	
1992	Bebe's Kids	Director / Principal Character Designer	
1993	A Cool Like That Christmas (TV Movie)	Character Designer	
1994	The Pagemaster	Supervising Animator	
1995	Happily Ever After: Fairy Tales for Every Child (TV Series)	Director - 12 Episodes / Character Designs - 2 Episodes/ Character Designer - 12 Episodes	
1995	A Goofy Movie	Character Designer	
1996	C Bear and Jamal (TV Series)	Creative Consultant - 3 Episodes / Character Designer	
1996	Quack Pack (TV Series)	Animation Director / Supervising Animator - 1 Episode	
1996	Space Jam	Animation Director	
1997	Cats Don't Dance	Character Designer / Supervising Animator	Sawyer and Max
1999	Tarzan	Supervising Animator	Kerchak, Baboons & Baby Baboon
2000	The Indescribable Nit (Short)	Animator	
2000	John Henry	Character Designer & Visual Development Artist	
2000	The Emperor's New Groove	Supervising Animator	Pacha
2001–2005	The Proud Family (TV Series)	Director - 6 Episodes / Executive Producer / Writer / Creator - 52 Episodes / Developer - 2 Episodes / Additional Voices	
2004	Home on the Range	Supervising Animator	Pearl Gesner
2004	One by One (Video short)	Visual Development Artist	
2004	Da Boom Crew (TV Series)	Co-Creator / Executive Producer	
2005	The Proud Family Movie	Director / Executive Producer	
2005	The Picnic (TV Movie)	Director	
2005	The Beach (TV Movie)	Director	
2009	The Princess and the Frog (Video Game)	Voice	
2009	The Princess and the Frog	Supervising Animator / Party Guest, Jeremy (voice)	Dr. Facilier
2011	Winnie the Pooh	Supervising Animator	Piglet, Kanga and Roo
2011	Kung Fu Panda: Secrets of the Masters (Video short)	Animator: Duncan Studio Production	
2012	Tangled Ever After (Short)	Lead Animator	
2012	Wreck-It Ralph	Additional Visual Development Artist	
2013	Frozen	Additional Visual Development Artist	
2014	The Pirate Fairy (Video)	Senior Creative Team	
2014	Planes: Fire & Rescue	Senior Creative Team	
2016	Middle School: The Worst Years of My Life	Animator: animation sequences	
2018	Teen Titans Go! To the Movies	Animator: additional animator	
2018	The Late Batsby	Storyboard artist	
2019	Hair Love	Director	
2022–2026	The Proud Family: Louder and Prouder	Director / Executive Producer / Writer / Creator	
2023	Hullabaloo	Character Animator (Episode: "The Great Race")	

=== Internet ===
Year	Title	Notes
2016	Cartoons vs. Cancer	Himself
