= Bryony Lavery =

British dramatist (born 1947)

Bryony Lavery (born 1947) is a prolific British dramatist who has written over 100 plays, with some counts putting it as high as 130. Known for her successful and award-winning 1998 play Frozen. In addition to her work in theatre, she has also written for television and radio. She has written books including the biography Tallulah Bankhead and The Woman Writer's Handbook. She taught playwriting at the University of Birmingham. She was elected a Fellow of the Royal Society of Literature in 2002.

== Biography ==
Lavery grew up in Dewsbury, West Yorkshire.

Having begun her career as an actress, she decided that she wanted to write plays with better parts for women. Early in her career she founded a theatre company called Les Oeufs Malades (The Bad Eggs) with actors Gerard Bell and Jessica Higgs. She also founded Female Trouble, More Female Trouble, and served as artistic director of Gay Sweatshop.

Her plays have a feminist undertone. She has written such plays as More Light, which has only one male speaking role, with almost entirely female casts. By 2002, she had written more than twenty plays. Later counts have put this number as high as 110 (see Complete List of Works), exceeding that of her contemporary Alan Ayckbourn. Including unproduced and spec work, this could go as high as 130 plays.

Lavery was elected a Fellow of the Royal Society of Literature in 2002.

In addition, she has written translations of such works as Chekhov's Uncle Vanya. In addition to this, she has also translated Henrik Ibsen's A Doll's House, twice, as well as Jourko Tourkka's Cherished Disappointments in Love.

She has written five plays for the National Theatre Connections series. Her successful Frozen triggered a controversy and discussion about artistic sources and plagiarism. It was the subject of a piece by Malcolm Gladwell published in The New Yorker and collected in his book What the Dog Saw.

She adapted Treasure Island, the novel by Robert Louis Stevenson, as a play which was first performed on the Olivier Stage of the National Theatre, London, on 3 December 2014, directed by Polly Findlay.

Over the COVID-19 pandemic, she wrote 'about twenty things... on spec'. To date, none have been performed. This would put her total for plays as high as 130.

In the years since, she has written adaptations of The Lovely Bones, Swallows and Amazons, Brideshead Revisited, The Midnight Gang, Oliver Twist, The Book of Dust: La Belle Sauvage, Sputnik Sweetheart and Midnight Cowboy, for a range of prestige theatres such as the Arcola and Southwark Playhouse, and for directors such as Melly Still and Nicholas Hytner.

She was married to a man until her early thirties. Since that period, Lavery has identified as gay.

== Selected works ==
- The Two Marias (1988) – Theatre Centre
- Her Aching Heart (1992)
  - The Pink Paper's Play of the Year
- Peter Pan (1991) – a pantomime
- Goliath (1997)
- More Light (1997) – National Theatre Connections
- Frozen (1998)
  - Nomination/Tony Award for Best Play
  - Eileen Anderson Central Television Award
  - TMA Best New Play Award
- The Magic Toyshop (2001)
- A Wedding Story (2000)
- Illyria (2002) – NT Connections
- Last Easter (2004)
- Stockholm (2007) – Frantic Assembly
- Red Sky (2007, play) – NT Connections
- It Snows (2008, play) – NT Connections
- Breathing Underwater (1998 radio play) – BBC Radio 7
- Kursk (2009, play) – Young Vic
- Beautiful Burnout (2010) – Frantic Assembly / National Theatre of Scotland
- Dirt (2012, play) – Studio Theatre
- The Believers (2014, play) – Tricycle Theatre

=== Stage adaptations ===
- A Christmas Carol (by Charles Dickens, music and lyrics by Jason Carr) – Chichester Festival Theatre (2008, 2015) / Birmingham Repertory Theatre (2009, 2013) / West Yorkshire Playhouse (2010)
- Treasure Island (by Robert Louis Stevenson) – National Theatre (2014) / Birmingham Repertory Theatre (2016)
- Brighton Rock (by Graham Greene) – Pilot Theatre / York Theatre Royal / UK tour (2018)
- The Lovely Bones (by Alice Sebold) – Royal & Derngate, Northampton / Liverpool Everyman & Playhouse / Northern Stage / Birmingham Repertory Theatre / New Wolsey Theatre (2018)
- The Midnight Gang (by David Walliams, music and lyrics by Joe Stilgoe) – Chichester Festival Theatre (2018)
- Swallows and Amazons (by Arthur Ransome) – Storyhouse / Grosvenor Park Open Air Theatre (2018)
- The Book of Dust - La Belle Sauvage (by Philip Pullman) – Bridge Theatre (2020).

== Complete List of Plays ==
- Of All Living (Produced 1967)
- Days at Court (Produced 1968)
- Warbeck (produced 1969)
- I Was Too Young at the Time to Understand Why My Mother Was Crying (produced 1976)
- Sharing (produced 1976)
- Germany Calling, with Peter Leabourne (produced 1976)
- Grandmother's Footsteps (produced 1977)
- Snakes (produced 1977)
- The Catering Service (produced 1977)
- Floorshow, with others (produced 1978)
- Helen and Her Friends (produced 1978)
- Bag (produced 1979)
- Time, Gentlemen, Please (cabaret; produced 1979)
- The Wild Bunch (for children; produced 1979)
- Sugar and Spice (for children; produced 1979)
- Unemployment: An Occupational Hazard? (for children; produced 1979)
- Gentlemen Prefer Blondes, adaptation of the novel by Anita Loos (produced 1980)
- The Joker (for children; produced 1980)
- The Charge of the Light Brigade co-written with Patrick Barlow (produced 1980)
- The Family Album (produced 1980)
- Pamela Stephenson One Woman Show (cabaret; produced 1981)
- Missing (produced 1981)
- Zulu, with Patrick Barlow (produced 1981)
- Female Trouble (cabaret; produced 1981)
- The Black Hole of Calcutta, with Patrick Barlow (produced 1982)
- Götterdämmerung; or, Twilight of the Gods, with Patrick Barlow and Susan Todd (produced 1982)
- For Maggie, Betty and Ida, music by Paul Sand (produced 1982)
- More Female Trouble (cabaret), music by Caroline Noh (produced 1982)
- Uniform and Uninformed, and Numerical Man (broadcast 1983)
- Hot Time (produced 1984)
- Calamity (produced 1984)
- Origin of the Species (produced 1984)
- The Wandsworth Warmers (cabaret; produced 1984)
- The Zulu Hut Club (for children; produced 1984)
- The Wandsworth Warmers Christmas Carol Concert (cabaret; produced 1985)
- Witchcraze (produced 1985)
- Over and Out (produced 1985)
- Getting Through (additional lyrics only), by Nona Shepphard, music by Helen Glavin (produced 1985)
- The Wandsworth Warmers in Unbridled Passions (cabaret; produced 1986)
- Sore Points (for children; produced 1986)
- Mummy, with Sally Owen and L. Ortolja (produced 1987)
- Madagascar (for children; produced 1987)
- The Headless Body, music by Stephanie Nunn (produced 1987)
- The Dragon Wakes (for children; produced 1988)
- Puppet States (produced 1988)
- The Drury Lane Ghost, with Nona Shepphard (produced 1989)
- Two Marias (produced 1989)
- The Snow Queen (produced 1989/1990)
- Wicked (produced 1990)
- Her Aching Heart (produced 1990)
- Kitchen Matters (produced 1990)
- Flight (produced 1991)
- Peter Pan, with Nona Shepphard (produced 1991)
- Creature - A Horror Party, for New Perspectives Theatre Company.
- The Sleeping Beauty, with Nona Shepphard (produced 1992)
- The Way to Cook a Wolf (produced 1993)
- Nothing Compares To You (produced 1995)
- Down Among The Mini-Beasts (produced 1996)
- About Suffering (unproduced, 1996)
- Ophelia (produced 1996)
- Goliath (produced 1997)
- More Light (produced 1997, for National Theatre’s Connections scheme)
- Frozen (produced 1998)
- Shot Through The Heart (produced 2000)
- Illyria (produced 2000)
- Behind The Scenes At The Museum, adaptation of the Kate Atkinson novel (produced 2000)
- A Wedding Story (produced 2000)
- Cherished Disappointments in Love, translated from the play by Jouko Turkka (produced 2001)
- The Magic Toyshop, adapted from the Angela Carter novel (produced 2002)
- Precious Bane, adapted from the Mary Webb novel (produced 2003)
- Thyestes (Furies) (produced 2003)
- A Doll’s House, translated from the Ibsen play (produced 2004)
- Discontented Winter: House Remix (produced 2004, for National Theatre Connections)
- Last Easter (produced 2004)
- Dracula, adapted from the Bram Stoker novel (produced 2005)
- Smoke (produced 2006)
- Yikes! (produced 2006)
- The Thing With Feathers (unproduced, 2006)
- Wise Children, adapted from Angela Carter (unproduced, 2006)
- Uncle Vanya, translated from Chekhov (produced 2007)
- Red Sky (produced 2007)
- Stockholm (produced 2007)
- It Snows (produced 2008)
- The Bloody Chamber, adapted from the Angela Carter novel (produced 2008)
- A Christmas Carol, adapted from the Dickens novel (produced 2008)
- Kursk (produced 2009)
- The Wicked Lady, from the Magdalen King-Hall novel (produced 2009)
- Beautiful Burnout (produced 2010)
- Cesario (produced 2012)
- Dirt (produced 2012)
- Thursday (produced 2013)
- Queen Coal (produced 2014)
- The Believers (produced 2014)
- 57 Hours In The House of Culture (produced 2014)
- The One Hundred and One Dalmatians, adapted from the novel by Dodie Smith (produced 2014)
- Treasure Island, adapted from the Robert Louis Stevenson novel (produced 2014)
- Brideshead Revisited (produced 2016)
- Our Mutual Friend, adapted from Dickens (produced 2017)
- Balls (produced 2017)
- #DR@CULA (produced 2017)
- Brighton Rock, adapted from the Graham Greene novel (produced 2018)
- Swallows and Amazons, adapted from the Arthur Ransome novel (produced 2018)
- The Lovely Bones, adapted from the Alice Sebold novel (produced 2018)
- Slime (produced 2018)
- The Parting Glass (unproduced, 2018)
- The Midnight Gang, adapted from the David Walliams novel, music by Joe Stilgoe (produced 2018)
- The Borrowers, adapted from the Mary Norton novel (produced 2019)
- Small Island, from the novel by Andrea Levy (unproduced, 2019)
- Oliver Twist, from the Charles Dickens novel (produced 2020)
- Oscar and the Pink Lady - unproduced, for Sheffield Theatres (2020)
- String, from the play collection Fifteen Heroines: The Labyrinth (produced 2020)
- Red Riding Hood - unproduced, for Theatre Royal Stratford (2020)
- The Book of Dust: La Belle Sauvage, adapted from the Philip Pullman novel (produced 2021)
- Lovely, Loving, Loved - short play for the Birmingham Rep's Park Bench Plays (2022)
- A Doll’s House, a new version (2023)
- Sputnik Sweetheart, adapted from the Haruki Murakami novel (2023)
- Midnight Cowboy, adapted from the James Leo Herlihy novel, music by Francis ‘Eg’ White (produced 2025)
- God Bless the NHS - a script-in-hand performance at Orange Tree Theatre (2026)

=== Other ===
- "Writing Plays" in The Women Writers Handbook, Aurora Metro Books, 2020.

Lovely, Loving, Loved received a television production with Sky Arts broadcasting the plays.

She wrote an unproduced series for Channel 4 called Private Dyke.

In 2009 she wrote a film spec script called Buy.

Since 2015 she has been working on a musical with Douglas Hodge called The Wigmaker's Tale or more recently Wigmaker (about a wigmaker whose wigs start speaking in the night once he has gone), which has had three outings so far: once in 2016 with Mel Giedroyc, and again in 2022, under the second title, Wigmaker. One of its songs got another outing in the 2026 5x5 collection of plays.

In 2018 she was working on Far Forest for Working Title and Dying Light for Adorable Media. To date, none have been produced.
