= Curve (disambiguation) =

A curve is a geometrical object in mathematics.

Curve(s) may also refer to:

== Arts, entertainment, and media ==
=== Music ===
- Curve (band), an English alternative rock music group
- Curve (album), a 2012 album by Our Lady Peace
- "Curve" (song), a 2017 song by Gucci Mane featuring The Weeknd
- Curve, a 2001 album by Doc Walker
- "Curve", a song by John Petrucci from Suspended Animation, 2005
- "Curve", a song by Cam'ron from the album Crime Pays, 2009

=== Periodicals ===
- Curve (design magazine), an industrial design magazine
- Curve (magazine), a U.S. lesbian magazine

=== Other uses in arts, entertainment, and media ===
- Curve (film), a 2015 film
- BBC Two "Curve" idents, various animations based around a curve motif
- "Curved", a 2023 episode of The Proud Family: Louder and Prouder
- Altoona Curve, a Minor League Baseball team.

== Brands and enterprises ==
- Curve (payment card), a payment card that aggregates multiple payment cards
- Curve (theatre), a theatre in Leicester, United Kingdom
- Curve, fragrance by Liz Claiborne
- BlackBerry Curve, a series of phones from Research in Motion
- Curves International, an international fitness franchise

== Other uses ==
- Bézier curve, a type of parametric curve used in computer graphics and related fields
- Curve (tonality), a software technique for image manipulation
- Curveball, a baseball pitch often called simply a "curve"
- Female body shape or curves
- French curve, a template made out of plastic, metal or wood used to draw smooth curves
- Grading curve, a system of grading students
- Yield curve, a representation of predicted value of a fixed income security for different durations

== See also ==
- Curvature
- Flat spline, a very flexible rule used to draw curves
- The Curve (disambiguation)
