= Chris Bush (playwright) =

British playwright and artistic director

- Born: 3 July 1986 (age 40); Sheffield, England
- Education: University of York
- Occupations: Playwright, artistic director

Christine Claire Bush (born 3 July 1986) is an Olivier Award Winning British playwright, bookwriter and artistic director.

== Overview ==
Bush was born in Sheffield, England. She studied at the University of York and currently resides in London.

Her theatrical career began in earnest at York University in 2005, when she founded White Rose Theatre, named in reference to the colour of the Yorkists during the Wars of the Roses. It was this theatre company, which she wrote for and directed, that gave her the first taste of success with TONY! The Blair Musical.

She is best known for writing the book for Standing At The Sky's Edge which won the Olivier Award for Best New Musical in 2023. Earlier work includes 2007's TONY! The Blair Musical, which enjoyed sell-out runs and critical acclaim at the York Theatre Royal and Edinburgh Fringe before transferring to the Pleasance Islington as winner of the inaugural Sunday Times NSDF Award for a successful off West-End run. Its sequel, Tony of Arabia, debuted at the Pleasance Dome, Edinburgh in 2008, running in rep with the original show.

In 2012 Bush made her full-length debut as a writer/performer with The Loves I Haven't Known, a musical comedy performed with regular composing partner Ian McCluskey.

In 2012-13 Bush completed a writer's attachment at the National Theatre Studio, and was the 2013 Pearson Playwright-in-Residence for Sheffield Theatres, where she wrote The Sheffield Mysteries, a contemporary take on the medieval Mystery Plays, directed by Daniel Evans.

Bush has been an Artist in Residence for the Oxford Playhouse and Sheffield Theatres, and a member of the Orange Tree Theatre Writers' Collective. She has won both the Perfect Pitch Award and Kevin Spacey Foundation Artist of Choice Award for Musical Theatre.

She has stated on numerous occasions that her favourite colour is Periwinkle. More recently, she was among the writers to receive first-look deals with ViacomCBS International Studios to start a program to amplify diverse voices.

On 18 July 2024, Bush was made an honorary Doctor of Letters at the University of Sheffield. Later that month, on 29 July 2024, she received a second honorary degree from the University of York.

On the 30th April 2024, Bush won the Hermitage Major Theatre award, worth $35,000, with her brand-new play Orlando (FL). On the 6th October 2025, the play was commissioned by Hermitage Artists, and on the 14th of the same month a staged read-through, with the script on lecterns, took place.

== Selected stage works ==
- TONY! The Blair Musical (2007) York Theatre Royal, Pleasance
- Tony of Arabia (2008) Theatre Royal, Wakefield, Oxford North Wall, Pleasance
- WOLF (2009) The Theatre, Chipping Norton and Latitude Festival
- The Loves I Haven't Known (2012) C Venues, Edinburgh
- 20 Tiny Plays about Sheffield (2013) Crucible Theatre Studio
- The Sheffield Mysteries (2014) Crucible Theatre
- Poking the Bear (2014) Theatre503
- Be|Spoke (2014) Sheffield Hallam University/Welcome to Yorkshire, Tour de Yorkshire
- Larksong (2015) New Vic Theatre
- A Declaration From the People (2015) Royal National Theatre
- A Dream (2016) Crucible Theatre
- What We Wished For (2017) Crucible Theatre
- Steel (2018) Sheffield Theatres
- The Assassination of Katie Hopkins (2018) Theatr Clwyd
- Pericles (2018) National Theatre
- The Changing Room (2018) National Theatre Connections
- The Last Noël (2018) The Old Fire Station
- Standing At The Sky's Edge (2019) Sheffield Theatres
- Faustus: That Damned Woman (2019) Lyric Hammersmith
- Kein Weltuntergang (2021) Schaubühne, Berlin
- Rock/ Paper/ Scissors (2022) Sheffield Theatres
- A Dolls House (adaptation) (2024) Sheffield Theatres

== Complete list of plays ==
- Man and God (2006) Smirnoff Underbelly, Edinburgh
- TONY! The Blair Musical (2007) York Theatre Royal, Pleasance
- Tony of Arabia (2008) Theatre Royal, Wakefield, Oxford North Wall, Pleasance
- WOLF (2009) The Theatre, Chipping Norton and Latitude Festival
- The Loves I Haven't Known (2012) C Venues, Edinburgh
- 20 Tiny Plays about Sheffield (2013) Crucible Theatre Studio
- The Sheffield Mysteries (2014) Crucible Theatre
- Sleight & Hand (2014) Summerhall
- Poking the Bear (2014) Theatre503
- Be|Spoke (2014) Sheffield Hallam University/Welcome to Yorkshire, Tour de Yorkshire
- Larksong (2015) New Vic Theatre
- The Bureau of Lost Things (2015) Theatre503
- A Declaration From the People (2015) Royal National Theatre
- A Dream (2016) Crucible Theatre
- Transcending (2016) Orange Tree Theatre (unproduced, or, if produced, no record of it exists)
- What We Wished For (2017) Crucible Theatre
- Speaking Freely (2018) Theatre 503
- The Assassination of Katie Hopkins (2018) Theatr Clwyd
- The Changing Room (2018) National Theatre Connections
- Scenes From The End Of The World (2018) The Yard, London
- Pericles (2018) National Theatre
- Steel (2018) Sheffield Theatres
- Standing At The Sky's Edge (2019) Sheffield Theatres
- The Last Noël (2019) The Old Fire Station
- Faustus: That Damned Woman (2020) Lyric Hammersmith
- Cerberus (2020) reading at The Bunker
- Nine Lessons and Carols: Stories for a Long Winter (2020) Almeida Theatre
- The Band Plays On (2021) Sheffield Theatres
- Hungry (2021) Paines Plough
- Kein Weltuntergang or (Not) The End of the World (2021) Schaubühne, Berlin
- Fantastically Great Women Who Changed The World (2021) MAST Mayflower, Southampton
- Jane Eyre (adaptation from Bronte) (2022) Stephen Joseph Theatre
- Rock / Paper / Scissors (2022) Sheffield Theatres
- The Doncastrian Chalk Circle (2022) National Theatre
- The Odyssey (adaptation from Homer) (2023) National Theatre
- A Doll's House (adaptation from Ibsen) (2024) Sheffield Theatres
- Robin Hood and the Christmas Heist (music by Matt Winkworth) Rose Theatre, Kingston
- Otherland (2025) Almeida Theatre
- Cinderella (2026) Rose Theatre, Kingston
- The Kids Are Alright (2026) The Curve - radio play for Fifth Word Theatre.
- The Right Woman (2027) Almeida Theatre
- Medea (after Euripides) (2027) Liverpool Everyman
- Orlando (FL) (TBA)

== Political views ==
Despite lampooning him on stage, Bush described Tony Blair as "a decent man who made some bad decisions", and stated that she had "come to ridicule beautiful Blair not vilify him". Some have argued that Bush is not critical enough of New Labour. Writing in The Daily Telegraph, Dominic Cavendish claimed that "the country is angrier than [Tony, The Blair Musical] allows". Contrarily, Paul Lowman of The Press (York) has praised Bush's even-handedness, stating that her greatest strength is her ability to "camouflage complex issues in a vastly entertaining, glossy, media friendly package".

Bush has stated that she is proud of her British heritage, and is a supporter of immigration to the country. On a 2009 episode of Come Dine with Me she stated that "what makes [her] really proud of Britain [is] the number of people who want to be here".

Bush champions the Koala and is a frequent donor to the Australian Koala Foundation.

== Popular culture ==
In November 2009, Bush appeared on an episode of the Channel 4 reality television programme Come Dine with Me. Bush placed joint first and received £500 of the £1000 prize, which according to her equated to a "year's wages in the theatre".
