= Cultural depictions of Tony Blair =

This page is a list of cultural depictions of Tony Blair on stage, screen and in other forms of fiction and entertainment.

== Television, drama and film ==
- The Tony Blair Witch Project (2000) – Mike Martinez
- The Deal (2003) – Michael Sheen
- The Government Inspector (2005) – James Larkin
- A Very Social Secretary (2005) – Robert Lindsay
- The Queen (2006) – Michael Sheen
- The Amazing Mrs Pritchard (2006) – John Brolly
- The Alastair Campbell Diaries (2007) – Michael Sheen
- The Trial of Tony Blair (2007) – Robert Lindsay
- Confessions of a Diary Secretary (2007) – Damian Lewis
- W (2008) – Ioan Gruffudd
- Quantum of Solace (2008) – Mathieu Amalric based his portrayal of Dominic Greene on Blair
- The Ghost Writer (2010) – Pierce Brosnan plays British prime minister Adam Lang, who is based on Blair
- The Special Relationship (2010) – Michael Sheen
- The Journey (2016) – Toby Stephens
- The Crown (2023) – Bertie Carvel

== Theatre ==
- The Audience by Peter Morgan (2015) - Rufus Wright
- Agreement by Owen McCafferty (2023) - Rufus Wright

== Satire ==
- Spitting Image (1994–1996) - Alistair McGowan
- Sermon from St. Albion's (1998) – Harry Enfield
- The Big Impression (2001) – Alistair McGowan
- 2DTV (2001) – Jon Culshaw and Enn Reitel
- Jeffrey Archer: The Truth (2002) – Steven Pacey
- The Simpsons: The Regina Monologues (2004) – Himself in cameo role
- TONY! The Blair Musical (2007) – James Duckworth
- Red Nose Day 2007 Catherine Tate Show Sketch (2007) – Himself
- Dead Ringers (2006–2007) – David Tennant and Jon Culshaw
- Headcases (2008) - Jon Culshaw
- The Hunt for Tony Blair (2011) – Stephen Mangan

== Literature ==
- St Albion Parish News (1997–2007), column in Private Eye
- Stormbreaker (2000) by Anthony Horowitz. The book has a Prime Minister of the United Kingdom who hosts the grand opening of computers for schoolchildren. The book takes place in the year it was published; Blair was Prime Minister of the United Kingdom at the time.
- Alan Clark Diaries: Volume 3: The Last Diaries 1993–1999 (2002) by Alan Clark
- Number Ten (2002) by Sue Townsend, in which British prime minister Edward Clare is based on Blair
- In the Presence of Mine Enemies (2003) by Harry Turtledove. Charlie Lynton is almost certainly named for Anthony Charles Lynton Blair, Prime Minister of the United Kingdom at the time of the book's writing. Like Lynton, Blair was born in Edinburgh, but appears more English than Scottish in his speech and bearing. He was also born in the mid-1950s and became party leader in the mid-1990s. However, unlike Lynton, Blair is not a fascist.
- The Blunkett Tapes (2006) by David Blunkett
- Dan Blair - Pilot For The Foreseeable Future - satirical comic strip in The Times, in the style of 1950s British sci-fi icon Dan Dare
- The Blair Years (2007) by Alastair Campbell
- The Ghost (2007) by Robert Harris in which the British prime minister Adam Lang is based on Blair
- A View From The Foothills: The Diaries of Chris Mullin (2009) by Chris Mullin

== Radio ==
- Independence Day UK (1996) – Actors briefly portray Blair and John Major announcing the creation of a coalition government at the start of the alien invasion from the movie Independence Day
- The News Huddlines (1997–2001)
- House 7 (a Russian radio soap) (1997) – Himself in cameo role

== Music ==
- "Tony Blair" (1999)
- "Shoot the Dog" (2002)
