= Juneteenth (disambiguation) =

Juneteenth is an American federal holiday celebrating the emancipation of African-Americans and the abolition of slavery.

Juneteenth may also refer to:

- "Juneteenth" (Atlanta), a television episode
- "Juneteenth" (Black-ish), a television episode
- "Juneteenth" (The Proud Family: Louder and Prouder), a television episode
- Juneteenth (novel), 1999, by Ralph Ellison
