= National Theatre Connections =

Annual youth theatre festival of the Royal National Theatre in London

Connections (also referred to as New Connections and formerly Shell Connections and BT Connections) is the Royal National Theatre in London's annual youth theatre festival. It was founded in 1995 and sponsored by Royal Dutch Shell until 2007 when the Bank of America took over the sponsorship. The plays are also published by the National Theatre each year.

== Scheme ==
The National Theatre annually commissions ten plays from established playwrights which are performed by youth theatre groups across the UK. Groups are invited to perform at Connections Festivals held at a professional theatre in their area. A random performance group from each play is then performed at the end of the Festival at the National Theatre.

== Professional productions ==
Several of the specially commissioned Connection plays have been professionally produced at the National Theatre. In 1999 Sparkleshark was performed. In 2006 three were produced; Burn by Deborah Gearing, Chatroom by Enda Walsh and Citizenship by Mark Ravenhill were performed in 2006; the latter two were revived in 2007 when they also toured. In 2008 Baby Girl by Roy Williams, DNA by Dennis Kelly and The Miracle by Lin Coghlan also received professional productions in the Cottesloe.

== Commissioned plays ==
=== 2024 ===
- Back in the Day by Yasmeen Khan
- Orchestra by Charlie Josephine
- Kiss/Marry/Push Off Cliff by Josh Azouz
- Shout by Alexis Zegerman
- Age is Revolting by Abi Zakarian
- The Periodicals by Siân Owen
- Replica by Titas Halder
- Dy Enw Marw (Your Name is Dead) by Elgan Rhys
- The Sad Club by Luke Barnes and Adam Pleeth
- Wind/Rush Generation(s) by Mojisola Adebayo

=== 2023 ===
- (Circle Dreams Around) The Terrible, Terrible Past by Simon Longman
- Old Times by Molly Taylor
- Is This Good Enough? by Avaes Mohammad
- The Heights by Lisa McGee
- Tuesday by Alison Carr
- Innocent creatures by Leo Butler
- Model Behaviour by Jon Brittain
- Samphire by Shamser Sinha
- Strangers Like Me by Ed Harris
- Is My Microphone On? by Jordan Tannahill

=== 2022 ===
- Cable Street by Lisa Goldman
- Chat Back by David Judge
- Find a Partner! by Miriam Battye
- Hunt by Fionnuala Kennedy
- Like There's No Tomorrow, created by the Belgrade Young Company with Justine Themen, Claire Procter and Liz Mytton
- The Ramayana Reset by Ayeesha Menon, with choreography by Hofesh Shechter, in association with Hofesh Shechter Company
- Remote by Stef Smith
- Superglue by Tim Crouch
- Variations by Katie Hims
- You don't need to make a Big Song and Dance out of it by Abbey Wright, Shireen Mula and Matt Regan, in association with Tackroom Theatre

=== 2019 ===
- Ageless by Benjamin Kuffuor
- Chaos by Laura Lomas
- Class by Doc Brown & Lajuane Lincoln
- Flesh by Rob Drummond
- Salt by Dawn King
- The Small Hours by Katherine Soper
- Stuff by Tom Wells
- terra/earth by Nell Leyshon, with Choreography by Anthony Missen
- The Sad Club by Luke Barnes, with Music by Adam Pleeth
- Variations by Katie Himms

Source -

=== 2018 ===
- BLANK by Alice Birch
- The Blue Electric Wind by Brad Birch
- The Changing Room by Chris Bush
- The Free-9 by Insook Chappell
- The Ceasefire Babies by Fiona Doyle
- These Bridges by Phoebe Eclair-Powell
- When They Go Low by Natalie Mitchell
- Want by Barney Norris
- The Sweetness of a Sting by Chinonyerem Odimba
- Dungeness by Chris Thompson

Source -

=== 2017 ===
- Three by Harriet Braun
- "#YOLO" by Matthew Bulgo
- FOMO by Suhayla El-Bushra
- Status Update by Tim Etchells
- Musical Differences by Robin French
- Extremism by Anders Lustgarten
- The School Film by Patrick Marber
- Zero for the Young Dudes! by Alistair McDowall
- The Snow Dragons by Lizzie Nunnery
- The Monstrum by Kellie Smith

=== 2016 ===
- Bassett by James Graham
- Bedbug by Snoo Wilson, Gary Kemp & Guy Pratt
- Blackout by Davey Anderson
- Citizenship by Mark Ravenhill
- Children of Killers by Katori Hall
- Eclipse by Simon Armitage
- Gargantua by Carl Grose
- I'm Spilling My Heart Out Here by Stacey Gregg
- It Snows by Bryony Lavery, Scott Graham & Steven Hoggett for Frantic Assembly
- The Musicians by Patrick Marber
- Take Away by Jackie Kay
- What Are They Like? By Lucinda Coxon

=== 2015 ===
- Drama, Baby by Jamie Brittain
- Hood by Katherine Chandler
- The Boy Preference by Elinor Cook and performed by Best Theatre Arts from St Albans, Hertfordshire
- The Edelweiss Pirates by Ayub Khan Din
- Follow, Follow by Katie Douglas and performed by The St Ives Youth Theatre from Cambridgeshire
- The Accordion Shop by Cush Jumbo
- Hacktivists by Ben Ockrent
- Hospital Food by Eugene O'Hare
- Remote by Stef Smith
- The Crazy Sexy Cool Girls' Fan Club by Sarah Solemani

=== 2014 ===
- A Letter to Lacey by Catherine Johnson
- Angels by Pauline McLynn
- A Shop Selling Speech by Sabrina Mahfouz
- Hearts by Luke Norris
- Heritage by Dafydd James
- Horizon by Matt Hartley
- Pronoun by Evan Placey
- Same by Deborah Bruce
- The Wardrobe by Sam Holcroft
- Tomorrow by Simon Vinnicombe

=== 2013 ===
- The Guffin by Howard Brenton
- Mobile Phone Show by Jim Cartwright
- What Are They Like? by Lucinda Coxon
- We Lost Elijah by Ryan Craig
- I'm Spilling My Heart Out Here by Stacey Gregg
- Tomorrow I'll Be Happy by Jonathan Harvey
- Soundclash by Lenny Henry
- Don't Feed the Animals by Jemma Kennedy
- Ailie and the Alien by Morna Pearson
- Forty-Five Minutes by Anya Reiss

=== 2012 ===
- Victim Sidekick Boyfriend Me by Hilary Bell
- Socialism Is Great by Anders Lustgarten
- So You Think You're A Superhero? by Paven Virk
- Prince of Denmark by Michael Lesslie
- The Ritual by Samir Yazbek
- Little Foot by Craig Higginson
- Journey To X by Nancy Harris
- The Grandfathers by Rory Mullarkey
- Generation Next by Meera Syal
- Alice By Heart by Steven Sater & Duncan Sheik

=== 2011 ===
- Bassett by James Graham
- The Beauty Manifesto by Nell Leyshon
- Children of Killers by Katori Hall
- Cloud Busting by Helen Blakeman adapted from the novel by Malorie Blackman
- Frank & Ferdinand by Samuel Adamson
- Gap by Alia Bano
- Gargantua by Carl Grose
- Shooting Truth by Molly Davies
- Those Legs by Noel Clarke
- Too Fast by Douglas Maxwell

=== 2009 ===
- Blackout by Davey Anderson
- Dirty Dirty Princess by Georgia Fitch
- The Dummy Tree by Conor Mitchell
- A Handbag by Anthony Horowitz
- Heartbreak Beautiful by Christopher William Hill
- The Heights by Lisa McGee
- Six Parties by William Boyd
- Success by Nick Drake
- The Seance by Anthony Neilson
- The Things She Sees by Ben Power
- Trammel by Michael Lesslie
- The Vikings And Darwin by David Mamet

=== 2008 ===
- Scenes From Family Life by Mark Ravenhill
- A Vampire Story by Moira Buffini
- Theatre of Debate: Blackout by Davey Anderson inspired by the stories of a young person from Barnardo's, Glasgow
- He's Talking by Nicholas Wright
- My Face by Nigel Williams
- Theatre of Debate: Big Hopes a verbatim play by Gary Owen inspired by an xl. group from The Princes Trust, Cardiff followed by Safe by Deborah Gearing inspired by Fairbridge Southampton
- Arden City by Timberlake Wertenbaker
- The Peach Child by Anna Furse and Little Angel Theatre
- Theatre of Debate directed and devised by Jeremy Weller with young people from Fairbridge Centres in Kennington and Hackney.
- The Book of Everything by Peter Tabern based on a novel by Guus Kuijer in the English translation by John Nieuwenhuizen
- Fugee by Abi Morgan.
- It Snows by Bryony Lavery and Frantic Assembly
- Burying Your Brother in the Pavement by Jack Thorne

DNA

=== 2007 ===
- A Bridge to the Stars by Henning Mankell
- A Year and A Day by Christina Reid
- Baby Girl by Roy Williams
- Red Sky by Bryony Lavery
- Ruckus in the Garden by David Farr
- Scary Play by Judith Johnson
- Show and Tell by Laline Paull
- Black Remote by Glyn Maxwell
- DeoxyriboNucleic Acid (a.k.a. DNA) by Dennis Kelly

=== 2006 ===
- Pass It On by Doug Lucie
- The Spider Men by Ursula Rani Sarma
- Broken Hallelujah by Sharman Macdonald
- Pack Up Your Troubles by Snoo Wilson
- Shut Up by Andrew Payne
- Feather Boy by Nicky Singer and Peter Tabern with lyrics by Don Black and music by Debbie Wiseman
- The Shoemaker's Incredible Wife by Federico García Lorca
- The Miracle by Lin Coghlan
- School Journey to the Centre of the Earth by Daisy Campbell with Ken Campbell
- Liar by Gregory Burke

=== 2005 ===
- Seventeen by Michael Gow
- Blooded by Isabel Wright
- Burn by Deborah Gearing
- Chatroom by Enda Walsh
- Citizenship by Mark Ravenhill
- Just by Ali Smith
- Lunch In Venice by Nick Dear
- Mugged by Andrew Payne
- Samurai by Geoffrey Case
- Through The Wire a musical by Catherine Johnson

=== 2004 ===
- Bedbug: The Musical by Snoo Wilson with music by Gary Kemp and Guy Pratt
- Boat Memory by Laline Paull
- Dead End by Letizia Russo (translated by Luca Scarlini and Aleks Sierz)
- Discontented Winter: House Remix by Bryony Lavery
- Eclipse by Simon Armitage
- Headstrong by April de Angelis
- Karamazoo by Philip Ridley (Script not included in the Shell Connections 2004 anthology book. Instead the first draft of the script was available to download for free from the NT Shell Connections website. The script received a physical release in 2015 as part of Ridley's play collection The Storyteller Sequence.)
- Moonfleece by Philip Ridley
- The Musicians by Patrick Marber
- Where I Come From: Scenes From Abroad by Mike Williams and Richard Nelson
- The Willow Pattern by Judith Johnson

=== 2003 ===
- Brokenville by Philip Ridley
- The Crossing Path by Maya Chowdhry
- Dust by Sarah Daniels
- The Ice Palace by Lucinda Coxon
- An Island Far From Here by Laura Ruohonen
- Moontel Six by Constance Congdon
- Multiplex by Christopher William Hill
- Purple by Jon Fosse
- The Queen Must Die by David Farr
- Totally Over You by Mark Ravenhill

=== 2002 ===
- Illyria by Bryony Lavery
- The Actor by Horton Foote
- The Bear Table by Julian Garner
- The Exam by Andy Hamilton
- Gold by Timothy Mason, Mel Marvin
- Lady Cill, Lady Wad, Lady Lurve, Lady God by Kay Adshead
- Nuts by Fausto Paravidino, Luca Scarlini and Zachery James Kinney
- Olive by Tasmin Oglesby
- Starstone by Christian Martin
- Take-Away by Jackie Kay
- Team Spirit by Judy Upton

=== 2001 ===
- After Juliet by Sharman Macdonald
- Electric Halos by Helen Adams
- Emperors and Clowns by Chris Barton
- Happy Endings devised by Danny Parker and Nigel Williams
- Human Puppets devised by Theatre Royal Bath Young People's Theatre company
- Kids are from Mars devised by the London Bubble company
- Lagna by Jez Simons
- Les Juifs de Salonique...
- A Peasant of El Salvador by Peter Gould, Stephen Stearns, adapted by Mick Fitzmaurice
- Sunnyside by Neill Morton
- Ticking by Mari Binnie
- Time on Fire by Timothy Mason
- Too Too Tight devised by the Chichester Festival Youth Theatre Street Art Company

=== 1999 ===
- After Juliet by Sharman Macdonald
- Can You Keep a Secret? by Winsome Pinnock
- Devil in Drag by Dario Fo
- Don't Eat Little Charlie by Tankred Dorst with Ursula Ehler
- Early Man by Hannah Vincent
- Friendly Fire by Peter Gill
- Gizmo by Alan Ayckbourn
- King of the Castle by Christina Reid
- Pilgrimage by Paul Goetzee
- Taking Breath by Sarah Daniels

=== 1997 ===
- Asleep Under The Dark Earth by Sian Evans
- The Chysalids adapted by David Harrower from the novel by John Wyndham
- Cuba by Liz Lochhead
- Dog House by Gina Moxley
- Eclipse by Simon Armitage
- The Golden Door by David Ashton
- In the Sweat by Naomi Wallace and Bruce McLeod
- More Light by Bryony Lavery
- Shelter by Simon Bent
- Sparkleshark by Philip Ridley
- Travel Club and Boy Soldier by Wole Soyinka
- The Ultimate Fudge by Jane Coles
