= New Kids on the Block (The Proud Family: Louder and Prouder) =

- The Proud Family: Louder and Prouder episode
- Left to right: Penny, Michael, Zoey, LaCienega and Dijonay standing in front of Maya and KG's house
- Episode no.: Season 1 Episode 1
- Directed by: Wolf-Rüdiger Bloss
- Written by: Ralph Farquhar
- Production code: 101
- Original release date: February 23, 2022

Episode chronology
← Previous —	Next → "Bad Influence(r)"

"New Kids on the Block" is the first episode of the first season of the American animated sitcom The Proud Family: Louder and Prouder which was released to Disney+ on February 23, 2022, serving as one of the series premieres alongside "Bad Influence(r)". It later premiered on Disney Channel on January 7, 2023.

In the episode, Penny's world is turned upside down when two new kids, Maya and her brother KG, move into the neighborhood and immediately re-shuffle the fragile status quo. "New Kids on the Block" was directed by Wolf-Rüdiger Bloss and written by Ralph Farquhar.

== Plot ==
Penny and her friends suddenly hit puberty with Michael embracing their pride and a saddened LaCienega getting hairier. When they go to see Sticky, they discover that he has moved away to establish himself in another city in Japan and that his house is occupied by the Leibowitz-Jenkinses. Penny tries to befriend the kids, Maya and KG, but Maya blows her off. Meanwhile, Oscar's incensed at the fact that Penny's becoming a woman and tries everything to keep her conservative. Penny tries a variety of ways to get Maya to like her, but she tells her that she doesn't like her because she's superficial. Taking her words to heart, Penny sneaks away from the school dance to help Maya save Shuggie the panda (CeeLo Green), only to learn that he doesn't want to be saved. When Maya insists otherwise, Penny calls her superficial and returns to the dance, with Maya conceding. Oscar arrives when he realizes that Penny's dressed up for the dance; forcing her to finally sit him down to tell him that she's becoming a woman. He finally accepts this as Penny dances with KG.

== Reception ==
"New Kids on the Block" received negative critical reviews. Branyan Towe of Loud and Clear Reviews wrote that the episode "mishandles its story and creates something that doesn’t feel like The Proud Family." Taylor Lyles of IGN states that the episode "had so many instances that screamed "hey, look, we’re in the 2020s now!" that it was more annoying than genuine. Whether it was references to trendy songs from the last several years or incredibly cheesy TikTok slang, the attempts at modern hipness fell flat."
