= BeBe =

- The Proud Family: Louder and Prouder episode
- Oscar Proud holds his son BeBe in relief after rescuing the latter from the former's unsafe snack factory
- Episode no.: Season 2 Episode 9
- Directed by: Latoya Raveneau
- Written by: Travis Andres
- Production code: 209
- Original release date: February 1, 2023
- Running time: 22 minutes

Episode chronology
← Previous "Us Again"	Next → "Juneteenth"

"BeBe" is the ninth and penultimate episode of the second season of the American animated sitcom The Proud Family: Louder and Prouder, and the nineteenth episode of the series overall. It was released to Disney+, alongside the rest of the second season, on February 1, 2023. Furthermore, the episode was also broadcast on Disney Channel on April 1 of the same year.

In this episode, the Proud family discover that BeBe is on the autism spectrum.

== Plot ==
While Oscar faces legal ramifications order over his factory, Penny is tasked with looking after BeBe and CeCe while hanging out with her friends at the museum. BeBe gets lost and climbs atop a plane and shows no fear when he falls. When Penny brings the twins home, BeBe does the same thing again, much to Oscar and Trudy's shock and concern. Dr. Payne believes that something is off with BeBe and sends them to Dr. Lord who tells them that BeBe is on the autism spectrum. She offers to have him attend her school, but Oscar refuses on the grounds that he believes nothing is wrong with him.

Penny opens up to Dr. Lord as she believes that this will bounce back on her and stress her out, which she agrees. Oscar is forced to take the twins to work with him where he fails the inspection and has his factory shut down for good. He finally relents in letting BeBe go to the special school and accepts that his son is different. Just as they leave, BeBe and his new friends are revealed to have superpowers.

== Voice cast ==
- Kyla Pratt as Penny Proud
- Tommy Davidson as Oscar Proud
- Paula Jai Parker as Trudy Proud
- Bresha Webb as:
  - CeCe Proud
  - Tobasco
- Aiden Dodson as BeBe Proud
- Keke Palmer as Maya Leibowitz-Jenkins
- Alisa Reyes as LaCienega Boulevardez
- Karen Malina White as Dijonay Jones
- Soleil Moon Frye as Zoey Howzer
- EJ Johnson as Michael Collins
- A Boogie wit da Hoodie as KJ Leibowitz-Jenkins
- Marcus T. Paulk as Myron Lewinski
- Aries Spears as Wizard Kelly
- Asante Blackk as Kareem Abdul-Jabbar Brown
- Chance the Rapper as Darrius St. Vil
- Miyachi as Billy Chang
- Bretman Rock as Makeup Boy
- CeeLo Green as Shuggie
- Brenda Song as Vanessa Vue
- Brian Hooks as Igloo
- Holly Robinson Peete as Dr. Lord
- Kevin Michael Richardson as Dr. Payne
- Cree Summer as Peabo

== Production ==
During production of the second season, series creators Bruce W. Smith and Ralph Farquhar were asked if they wanted to explore autism in an episode, to which they immediately made BeBe Proud the autistic character, though BeBe was already confirmed to be autistic before this season. Holly Robinson Peete provides the voice of Dr. Lord.

"BeBe" was written by Travis Andres and directed by frequent series director Latoya Raveneau.

== Reception ==
"BeBe" was positively received by fans and critics alike. Fans praised the episode's heartwarming and realistic portrayal of autism. Marcus Gibson of Bubbleblabber states, "as someone who’s also on the spectrum, I thought that episode did a solid job displaying this disability." Branyan Towe of Loud and Clear Reviews states, "the early diagnosis and the reaction of Penny’s father, Oscar Proud both feel true to life."
