= White Rose Theatre =

- Address: York; United Kingdom
- Production: Lost Soul Music

Construction
- Years active: 2005 – present

Website
- http://www.whiterosetheatre.co.uk/ whiterosetheatre.co.uk]

White Rose Theatre was founded by playwright and director Chris Bush while at the University of York in 2005. Started as a new writing company, they currently specialise in new musical theatre, and are best known for their 2007 production TONY! The Blair Musical.

== Productions ==
- Olympia (2005) University of York
- Man & God (2006) Smirnoff Underbelly, Edinburgh, Rotherham Arts Centre
- TONY! The Blair Musical (2007) York Theatre Royal, C Venues, Edinburgh, Pleasance, Islington
- The Ash Grove (2007) University of York
- Tony of Arabia (2008) Theatre Royal, Wakefield, North Wall, Oxford, Pleasance Dome, Edinburgh
- Lost Soul Music (2008–) C Venues, Edinburgh, Square Chapel, Halifax, Pleasance, Islington

== Awards ==
- The Sunday Times NSDF Edinburgh Competition 2007: Winner - TONY! The Blair Musical
- MTM: Musical Theatre Matters Awards 2007: Best Ensemble TONY! The Blair Musical (nominee)
- MTM: Musical Theatre Matters Awards 2008: Best Lyrics – Chris Bush for Tony of Arabia (nominee)
- Spotlight NSDF Emerging Artists Awards 2008: Best Show - Simon Says (shortlisted)
- Spotlight NSDF Emerging Artists Awards 2008: Best Music/Lyrics - Chris Bush and Ian McCluskey for Tony of Arabia
- Spotlight NSDF Emerging Artists Awards 2008: Best Actor – James Duckworth for Simon Says (part of Lost Soul Music)
- Spotlight NSDF Emerging Artists Awards 2008: Best Writing – Chris Bush for Simon Says (part of Lost Soul Music)
