= List of The Proud Family: Louder and Prouder episodes =

This is a list of episodes of the American animated television series The Proud Family: Louder and Prouder, a revival of the Disney Channel animated series The Proud Family (2001–2005). The series is produced by Bar Productions and Disney Television Animation and released on Disney+.

== Series overview ==
Season	Episodes	Originally released	
Season	Episodes	First released	Last released
1	10	February 23, 2022	April 20, 2022
2	10	February 1, 2023	
3	9 (+1 unaired)	August 6, 2025	
4	10	July 29, 2026	

== Episodes ==
=== Season 1 (2022) ===
No. overall	No. in season	Title	Directed by	Written by	Original release date	Disney Channel airdate	Prod. code
1	1	"New Kids on the Block"	Wolf-Rüdiger Bloss	Ralph Farquhar	February 23, 2022	January 7, 2023	101
Penny and her friends suddenly hit puberty with Michael embracing their pride and a saddened LaCienega getting hairier. When they go to see Sticky, they discover that he has moved away to establish himself in another city in Japan and that his house is occupied by the Leibowitz-Jenkinses. Penny tries to befriend the kids, Maya and KG, but Maya blows her off. Meanwhile, Oscar's incensed at the fact that Penny's becoming a woman and tries everything to keep her conservative. Penny tries a variety of ways to get Maya to like her, but she tells her that she doesn't like her because she's superficial. Taking her words to heart, Penny sneaks away from the school dance to help Maya save Shuggie the panda (CeeLo Green), only to learn that he doesn't want to be saved. When Maya insists otherwise, Penny calls her superficial and returns to the dance, with Maya conceding. Oscar arrives when he realizes that Penny's dressed up for the dance; forcing her to finally sit him down to tell him that she's becoming a woman. He finally accepts this as Penny dances with KG.
2	2	"Bad Influence(r)"	Tara Whitaker	L.J. Lawrence	February 23, 2022	January 7, 2023	102
Penny's surprised that everyone's obsessed with the latest social media influencer Makeup Boy (Bretman Rock), but she sees through his salesman-like tactics. To prove a point, Penny creates a video called Growing Up Proud. The video goes viral and the Gross Sisters, who now want legitimate compensation to start their rap careers, "ask" Penny to play their track on her next video. Penny keeps up her series and begins to rack up followers to the point that she has power to control people's views. She cancels Makeup Boy, ruining his career, and soon uses this ability to cancel LaCienega, the teachers and send Suga Mama away. Maya confronts Penny on her behavior and uses KG's drone to catch Oscar getting paid off by Wizard Kelly; sending it out to the internet and causing Penny to lose all of her followers. Penny encounters Makeup Boy, now going by Sebastian, who thanks her for bringing him back to his roots. Upon returning home, Penny apologizes for her actions as a newly swollen Suga Mama punishes Oscar for helping Penny send her away.
3	3	"It All Started with an Orange Basketball"	Latoya Raveneau	Calvin Brown Jr.	March 2, 2022	January 14, 2023	103
Oscar makes a foolish bet with Wizard Kelly that if his basketball team beats his, they have to switch lives for a week, but if he loses, his protégé Peabo has to work for him. Oscar inadvertently injures his star player, Michael, and tries to turn to Penny's new tall boyfriend Kareem Abdul-Jabbar Brown (Asante Blackk), but he turns out to be horrible. He discovers that Penny is actually good, as he taught her when she was a little girl, and coerces her to join the team, despite her disliking the sport. Her devotion to the team causes her to miss study meetings with Kareem and allowing LaCienega to bud with him. Hurt and angry Kareem eventually approaches and confronts Penny and tells her to be true to herself, while also revealing that he is good at basketball. Oscar's team is outmatched and Penny has everyone forfeit the game. She stops by Kareem's recital where she reconciles with him and he leaves LaCienega to be with Penny. Oscar tries to back out of his deal with Wizard Kelly and is forced to work as a ticket taker at the Wizard Kelly theater with Peabo as his new boss.
4	4	"Father Figures"	Latoya Raveneau	Ralph Farquhar	March 9, 2022	January 14, 2023	104
While Oscar tries to get a loan for a new theme park, Penny and her friends are upset over not getting tickets to see Pink-I in concert. Luckily, Maya and KG's father Barry, a police officer, gets them in. Upon arrival, Dijonay learns that Maya and KG have two dads, the other being Randall, a banker. Despite Penny telling her not to, Dijonay posts this fact online, causing everyone at school to shun them. Penny tries to help them, but unintentionally offends them over the fact that they are adopted. Oscar bans Penny from hanging out with the siblings, pushing her and the other Prouds away from him. Oscar goes to the bank to get a loan and impresses Randall, but upon seeing him kissing Barry, suddenly feels tense; losing the loan in the process. Penny and her friends stand up for Maya and KG in front of the Gross Sisters and get invited to their house for gumbo. The whole neighborhood arrives, including Oscar, who finally accepts the Leibowitz-Jenkinses and gets the approved loan; resulting in him buying a radioactive plot of land.
5	5	"Snackland"	Tara Whitaker	L.J. Lawrence	March 16, 2022	January 21, 2023	105
Oscar finally builds Snackland where, to no one's surprise, it is poorly kept and has dangerously built rides. After a father and son get seriously injured, Oscar is about to close it, but the father and son reveal that they liked it and soon people return to Snackland. It is later revealed that Oscar stole the idea from Freddy Frito of Frito Snacks, but he shoos her away. Meanwhile, Bobby reforms LPDZ, but Penny discovers that her voice sounds like Tone Loc, which everyone keeps telling her. Her voice convinces her to own it, but the crew do not like it and it deters the crowd at Snackland. Soon, Bobby replaces Penny with Maya, changing the name to LMDZ, making her dejected. Lizzo, who was visiting the park, gives words of encouragement to Penny and tells her to embrace her voice. Lizzo goes to perform and has Penny take center stage with her group; winning the crowd over. Lizzo goes looking for Oscar after his check bounced, while Penny's friends apologize for dropping her from the group.
6	6	"Get In"	Wolf-Rüdiger Bloss	Tiffany Thomas	March 23, 2022	January 21, 2023	106
Oscar and Trudy keep forgetting to pick up Penny and her friends; forcing her to rely on Bobby. While helping him get some "gas station nachos" as payment, Penny gets the idea to create a ride service that can pick up kids after school with Bobby unintentionally contributing the name Get In. Penny and her friends manage to acquire the money, but the business quickly falls apart; forcing Penny to have to go on Crab Barrel with Bobby in order to get investors. Despite the hosts getting upset upon learning her relation to Oscar, she manages to get invested, again mostly due to Bobby, and her business explodes. Meanwhile, Oscar has trouble working his single employee Mr. Carmichael, who is actually a monkey, and gets confronted by animal services. Penny tells Oscar that it is because of him that she is a success. However, Carmichael, who started working at Get In, single-handedly tanks the company due to being a monkey and Oscar ends up in jail due to his association, though gets literally flushed out by a rat.
7	7	"When You Wish Upon a Roker"	Latoya Raveneau	Ashley Soto Paniagua	March 30, 2022	January 28, 2023	107
After Oscar ruins a date between Penny and Kareem, even though the latter does not mind, Penny angrily bemoans having to put up with her family and wishes to be on her own. Al Roker appears to once again offer Penny his assistance and she, as well as her friends, accept his offer to wish themselves as Sophomores in college, though they are given one week to decide if they want the change permanently. Penny and her friends love campus life, but soon Penny finds herself unable to keep up with her classes and all her friends decide to return to their old lives. Penny stubbornly stays the week, but soon regrets it and has to pay off everything to get her old life back. Oscar, having been given Roker's offer by Dijonay, comes to talk sense into Penny and she agrees to return. They go up against Roker in a basketball game with Oscar indirectly winning and are both sent back home to their old lives. Oscar admits to Penny that the experience at the play earlier was because he wanted to be on stage.
8	8	"Home School"	Tara Whitaker	Tiffany Thomas	April 6, 2022	January 28, 2023	108
The kids get the mean Ms. Hill (Tiffany Haddish) as their substitute teacher. In the evening, Penny realizes that she forgot her cellphone in detention and sneaks into the school to get it, only to find that Ms. Hill is homeless and lives in the teacher's lounge. She tells her friends the next day not to let anyone know, but Dijonay blabs about it; causing Ms. Hill to get fired and live in her car. Meanwhile, Zoey is made drum major, despite her not having any rhythm, and seeks out Bobby to help train her in the ways of the funk. Feeling guilty, Penny invites Ms. Hill to stay with her and her family, but quickly regrets it as she is a bossy teacher even when not working. She decides to hold a fundraiser to get Ms. Hill back on her feet, but no one at the school assembly will help, that is until Zoey uses what Bobby taught her to excite the crowd into donating. Ms. Hill happily thanks Penny for the donation and rekindles her romantic relationship with Bobby, who was her prom date back in high school.
9	9	"Raging Bully"	Latoya Raveneau	Kylee Evans	April 13, 2022	February 4, 2023	109
LaCienega is getting prepared for her quinceañera when her cousin LaBrea Avanúñez (Princess Nokia) and her mother Melrose (Eva Longoria) arrive. LaBrea, who was once a chubby jokester, is now thin and pretty while the self-entitled Melrose constantly undermines her sister Sunset. Penny and the rest of her friends like the new LaBrea while it is becoming increasingly obvious that LaCienega is becoming jealous. On the day of the quinceañera, Sunset continues to add more things to impress Melrose, such as inviting Kid Capri, and LaBrea plays a prank on LaCienega that results in her getting trapped on one of the rides in Snackland. KG uses his drone to find her as Penny and everyone come to rescue her. LaBrea admits that she was jealous of her and that her mother puts pressure on her because they are broke (she is even wearing shape wear to make herself look thin). They get LaCienega down and make up while Melrose apologizes to Sunset for being so dismissive with her. Felix is flummoxed by the bill for the quinceañera.
10	10	"Old Towne Road (Part 1)"	Wolf-Rüdiger Bloss	Calvin Brown Jr.	April 20, 2022	February 4, 2023	110
Trudy traces her Parker family history to its roots. When she tries to trace Oscar's roots, they do not seem to go anywhere. She does some digging and discovers that Oscar, Suga Mama and Bobby's family is from Oklahoma. The entire Proud Family, especially Suga Mama, reluctantly go to Towne, Oklahoma where they are greeted by Suga Mama's still living Pa (Glynn Turman) and her brothers who own a ranch. Pa wants nothing to do with Suga Mama, but another relative named Myrtle (Debbie Allen) invites them in where the rest of the family is very cordial and inviting. Oscar immediately picks up some wrangling habits that make Pa proud, Penny hangs out with her cousins where she learns to live without technology and Bobby makes music with June Bug (Lil Nas X). It becomes apparent that Suga Mama's discomfort comes from her father's blatant sexism of refusing to let her join in any activities. Following another put down, Suga Mama solemnly walks off without making a comeback; ending the episode on a cliffhanger.

=== Season 2 (2023) ===
No. overall	No. in season	Title	Directed by	Written by	Original release date	Disney Channel airdate	Prod. code
11	1	"Old Towne Road (Part 2)"	Tara N. Whitaker	Calvin Brown Jr.	February 1, 2023	March 4, 2023	201
After being insulted by Pa Towne, Suga Mama decides to leave Towne and Penny joins her after she finds out that LaCienega is now dating Kareem (courtesy of Dijonay). They wander the desert before encountering Native American Quanah (Wes Studi) and his grandson Tyee (Forrest Goodluck), who Penny falls in love with. Years ago, Suga Mama was set to marry Quanah, but laws at the time prevented them from doing so. They planned to run away together, but Quanah chose to stay because Pa Towne threatened him and because he felt he could do more for his community, which he has done so. The rest of the Townes brings the group back and the following day, they attend the rodeo. Oscar is doing well at first until the bull he is riding becomes too much for him. Finally answering his cries, Suga Mama tames the bull in front of everyone, finally making Pa Towne realize that Suga Mama could do anything. They finally make up with one another and Suga Mama and Quanah agree to remain friends. As the Prouds finally leave, Penny accepts her family history. In a post-credits scene, Kareem tells Penny that he and LaCienega are not dating. Penny tells him that's it's okay and puts on the hat that Tyee gave her when she left Towne and says it's "from a friend", leaving Kareem confused.
12	2	"Grandma's Hands"	Wolf-Rüdiger Bloss	Tiffany Thomas	February 1, 2023	March 4, 2023	202
Penny continues to arrive home late at night from hanging out with Kareem and continuously fails to do her homework. Fed up with her irresponsible behavior, Trudy locks Penny out of the house and refuses to let her in to teach her a lesson. Oscar gives Penny some bus money to go to Suga Mama's house. While she takes her in, she knows of Penny's misdeeds and subjects her to a variety of chores that tire her out. Even when her friends show up, they get dragged into helping out around the house. To further annoy her, Trudy announces that she, Oscar and the twins are heading to New York City to see her sister's new play for the week. Just as Penny finally gets used to her new routine, Suga Mama suddenly falls down the stairs and is stuck in a wheelchair. At first, she is scared that Penny will take her revenge on her, but she instead agrees to take care of her and Bobby. As the rest of the Prouds return home, Trudy is happy to see that Penny has improved as she admits that she did it all out of love. Penny and Trudy make up.
13	3	"Curved"	Latoya Raveneau	Ashley Soto Paniagua	February 1, 2023	March 11, 2023	203
Penny is preparing for her and Dijonay's friend-iversary. At the same time, she is also on the debate team with Maya, Myron, and Zoey. However, Zoey has lost her voice and a new debate team member is randomly chosen by their teacher Brother Kwame (Leslie Odom Jr.), who turns out to be Dijonay. No one thinks she is up to the task, but to their astonishment, Dijonay is revealed to have an eidetic memory and is able to help the team win the debate. She soon meets Darrius St. Vil (Chance the Rapper), another debate member, and begins to spend more time with him. Penny becomes angered, especially when they both begin to openly mock her in front of them. While at the zoo, Penny voices her frustrations to Shuggie the Panda before discovering that Darrius has been lifting notes from Dijonay. She reveals this to the team and Dijonay is angered and quits. On the day of the debate, Dijonay returns and helps her team win. While angry at Darrius, she forgives him and opts to celebrate her win and friend-iversary with Penny.
14	4	"A Perfect 10"	Tara N. Whitaker	Annabel Feeney	February 1, 2023	March 11, 2023	204
While taking gymnastics class, LaCienega realizes that her big feet allow her to be an excellent gymnast. This results in Penny and her friends pushing her into being a professional gymnast with Sunset and Randall backing her up due to their own unresolved issues. Meanwhile, Trudy gets a kangaroo out of a tree and Oscar takes him and names him Zapp when he proves to be a positive match for him. As LaCienega's Olympic star rises, tensions rise with the group as they feed off of her success. After turning down Wizard Kelly's offer to sign, LaCienega beats Laurie Hernandez to participate in the Olympics, much to LaCienega’s chagrin. However, Zapp is revealed to be JoJo, Laurie’s pet kangaroo, and while going over Wizard Kelly's new contract, a food fight breaks out, resulting in LaCienega breaking her leg. Wizard signs up with Laurie instead. As everyone argues with each other, except for a despondent LaCienega, Suga Mama calls everyone out for being greedy and taking advantage of LaCienega’s fame and they apologize to and makeup with LaCienega for taking advantage of her and for using her for greed. LaCienega continues to teach kids gymnastics as BeBe shows off his own physicality.
15	5	"Puff Daddy"	Wolf-Rüdiger Bloss	Kylee Evans	February 1, 2023	March 18, 2023	205
Felix and Papi arrive on the Prouds' doorstep with puppies that they claim to belong to Puff after he impregnated their dog, La Lupe. Oscar and Suga Mama deny the allegation and soon a war rages between the two trying to get rid of the puppies. Meanwhile, Penny gets an internship at Teen Rogue as the personal assistant to Talia Rogue (Gabrielle Union) who is strict and domineering. Penny is forced to take them to work as the adults fight over the puppies. Believing they were brought for her, Talia happily accepts the puppies and even promotes Penny to a better office, albeit still unpaid. After going on two different courtroom shows and getting different responses, Oscar, Suga Mama, Felix, and Papi go on Maury Povich who conclude that Puff is not the father of La Lupe's puppies. Penny manages to give them away to Talia, but they find out too late that the puppies are a rare breed and worth thousands. As Suga Mama and Papi makeup, La Lupe is seen interacting with the real father of the puppies.
16	6	"The End of Innocence"	Latoya Raveneau	Kylee Evans	February 1, 2023	March 18, 2023	206
All the girls at school are excited to hear that Odder Things star Noah Barker (Andre Jamal Kinney) is transferring to their school. Upon his arrival, he immediately asks out Zoey, much to everyone's confusion. Maya informs everyone that he only dates white girls. In response, they kick Zoey out of their Disney Princess party. When Zoey crashes the party to confront them, she disbelieves the girls about Noah, and accuses them of being jealous. Meanwhile, Suga Mama reunites with her friend Celia (Jane Lynch) and heads out to Wiz Vegas. Celia is overly lucky and Suga Mama becomes Jealous and accuses her of stealing Papi from her. Zoey crashes the Disney party and Penny tries to have everyone express their feelings, but this causes a bigger rift between them. Penny and Suga Mama talk with Suga Mama making up with Celia. At the Valentine's Day dance, Zoey tells the girls that she broke up with Noah about his preferences and they apologize for ostracizing her. Myron asks Zoey to dance, admitting that he is attracted to her brain rather than her skin color and she accepts.
17	7	"The Soul Vibrations"	Tara N. Whitaker	Ashley Soto Paniagua and Calvin Brown Jr.	February 1, 2023	March 25, 2023	207
Penny and her friends plan to camp out to get tickets to Young Toddler who will have singer Giselle (Normani) of the Soul Vibrations. Oscar and Suga Mama are oddly negative about her and Bobby reveals that he, Oscar, Cousin Ray Ray (Anthony Anderson), and Giselle used to be together as the Soul Vibrations with Suga Mama as their manager. Bobby and Oscar both give slightly conflicting stories about how "they" were the talented ones before getting invited to Merlin Kelly's party to perform. Giselle stole the spotlight from them, signed with Merlin behind their backs, and left. Ray Ray arrives and reveals that he got backstage tickets for them to see Giselle who gives her own side of the story. She was always the talented one and she quit because Suga Mama did not see her as family. Suga Mama arrives and reveals that Merlin betrayed them all and she and Giselle make up. Suga Mama finally admits that Bobby has no talent and Giselle admits that she was sweet with Ray Ray. She invites her former bandmates up on stage to perform with her again.
18	8	"Us Again"	Wolf-Rüdiger Bloss	L.J. Lawrence	February 1, 2023	March 25, 2023	208
Penny invites Zoey to her house on a bad night when her family is arguing all the time. Zoey envies her family for their arguments, but Penny wishes her family could be better for once. The next day, Penny, Zoey, Oscar, and Trudy begin to notice that everyone in town is acting differently such as Suga Mama and Papi switching languages, the Gross Sisters and Wizard Kelly being nice and Penny and Zoey's friends acting the opposite of who they are. Zoey reveals that her whole family including herself has been replaced by clones. Penny runs home and discovers her family captured by more clones and the peanuts Macadamia and Pistachio. They want to learn about happiness but do not know how. The Prouds, with the help of Bobby, Suga Mama and Zoey, tell corny jokes to make them all laugh. Just as the Peanuts plan to get rid of them anyway, the events turn out to be a dream that Penny had, similar to the previous one where she had a driver's license, and accept her family's flaws. She wakes up again after having another fright from the peanuts.
19	9	"BeBe"	Latoya Raveneau	Travis Andres	February 1, 2023	April 1, 2023	209
While Oscar faces legal ramifications over his factory, Penny is tasked with looking after BeBe and CeCe while hanging out with her friends at the museum. BeBe gets lost, climbs atop a plane and shows no fear when he falls. When Penny brings the twins home, BeBe does the same thing again, much to Oscar and Trudy's shock and concern. Dr. Payne believes that something is off with BeBe and sends them to Dr. Lord (Holly Robinson Peete) who tells them that BeBe is on the autism spectrum. She offers to have him attend her school, but Oscar refuses on the grounds that he believes nothing is wrong with him. Penny opens up to Dr. Lord as she believes that this will bounce back on her and stress her out, to which she agrees. Oscar is forced to take the twins to work with him where he fails the inspection and has his factory shut down for good. He finally relents in letting BeBe go to the special school and accepts that his son is different. Just as they leave, BeBe and his new friends are revealed to have superpowers.
20	10	"Juneteenth"	Tara N. Whitaker	Samira Fuller	February 1, 2023	April 1, 2023	210
As Barry reveals that he is descended from Smithville's founder Christian A. Smith, Maya goes to school and meets Emily (Storm Reid), a girl who beckons her to inquire about Smith's history, learning that there is virtually no information about him prior to 1900. No one else seems to notice Emily, but Maya, who finds a journal from her buried in the dirt near the statue of Smith, whom the town plans on honoring later. Maya, Penny, and their friends take the journal to Brother Kwame and discover that it contains information revealing that Smith was a slave owner and that Emily is a ghost, and may have been killed for trying to celebrate the first Juneteenth. Wizard Kelly refuses to end the celebration and Barry refuses to believe his family history. Upset, the kids go to the celebration and march, resulting in them and their parents getting arrested for standing up. Barry admits that he was ashamed and apologizes. After a month of negotiations, Smithville is renamed Emilyville and a statue of Emily is erected instead of Smith. Maya then sees Emily appear as an old woman before her spirit disappears, implying she was not killed and lived to know freedom.

=== Season 3 (2025) ===
No. overall	No. in season	Title	Directed by	Written by	Original release date	Prod. code
21	1	"Proud Family-Verse"	Wolf-Rüdiger Bloss	Ralph Farquhar	August 6, 2025	301
22	2	"Proud Family-Verse"	Lele Abreu Silva	Calvin Brown Jr.	August 6, 2025	302
23	3	"The Shade of It All"	Wolf-Rüdiger Bloss	Tiffany Thomas	August 6, 2025	303
Dijonay desires to enter a sorority's beauty pageant that Trudy was in before when she was young. However, they discover that said sorority and their discriminates against dark-skinned people like Dijonay by using the brown paper bag test, only accepting lighter-skinned people like Trudy, who previously believed she was dark-skinned until Oscar explicitly points it out to her. Penny then gets the idea to protest the sorority's pageant by creating their own pageant celebrating Black beauty of all kinds called "The Brown Paper Bag Pageant", with her friends and family hosting it at the inexplicably-reopened Snackland theme park.
24	4	"O Mother, Where Art Thou?"	Lele Abreu Silva	Kylee Evans	August 6, 2025	304
KG desires to find who his birth mother is and has Penny steal the paperwork from the agency where he and Maya were adopted. Penny finds both adopted Leibowitz-Jenkins siblings' adoption papers, discovering that KG's adoption was a closed adoption while Maya's birth mother is talk show host Breyana DuBois. Penny, KG, and their friends reunite Maya with Breyana, much to Maya's initial resistance, but things get testy when Dijonay discovers that Breyana plans to reveal her relation to Maya on her talk show.
25	5	"Game Changer"	Wolf-Rüdiger Bloss	L.J. Lawrence	August 6, 2025	306
26	6	"Forward to the Past"	Wolf-Rüdiger Bloss	Samira Fuller-Farquhar	August 6, 2025	307
27	7	"Will the Real Young Toddler Please Stand Up?"	Lele Abreu Silva	Travis Andres	August 6, 2025	308
Penny desires to get Talia Rogue to promote her to a reporter position for Teen Rogue, so Talia gives her three days to get an interview with popular but reclusive rapper Young Toddler or else she would be forced to continue being Talia's errand girl. Penny investigates all around Emilyville to find Young Toddler, with the only clue being a photo of a pacifier tattoo on his palm, eventually discovering that her classmate Billy Chang is the rapper. However, Billy refuses to be interviewed due to an incident during a school talent show where he was booed off stage, leading him to believe that people do not want an Asian rapper and creating the Young Toddler stage persona to get around this issue. Penny is forced to choose between exposing his identity to get her promotion or maintaining his privacy at the cost of her career.
28	8	"Wiz Kid"	Wolf-Rüdiger Bloss	Kylee Evans	August 6, 2025	309
Following an IQ test, Penny, Dijonay and Myron are moved into the Wiz Kids program, an advance class for high-scoring students which includes Julie Chang and surprisingly, Nubia Gross. But it's not all cracked up to be due to having extra homework to deal with. Meanwhile, Wizard Kelly buys Snackland from Oscar and renames it Bubbaland after Bubba Wallace.
29	9	"Wild, Lost, and Free, Part I"	Lele Abreu Silva	Tiffany Thomas	August 6, 2025	310
Penny and Kareem have been getting obsessed with each other lately to the point of neglecting their studies and other obligations. Their parents try various increasingly aggressive methods to restrict them from seeing or communicating with each other, but the lovestruck young couple circumvent each and every one of them. After Kareem's parents decide to have him move to his aunt and uncle's home in Arkansas, he and Penny run away together from Emilyville.
-	-	"They're Gonna Love Me"	Lele Abreu Silva	Ashley Soto Paniagua	N/A	305
Note: Originally produced as the fifth episode of the season, it was leaked online on August 8, 2026. It presumably never released due to the episode focusing on non-binary character Michael Collins. Although the episode was boarded and voice-acted, it never made it passed the animation stage.

=== Season 4 (2026) ===
No. overall	No. in season	Title	Directed by	Written by	Original release date	Prod. code
30	1	"Wild, Lost, and Free, Part II"	Lele Abreu Silva	Ashley Soto Paniagua	July 29, 2026	401
As Penny and Kareem run away from their hometown Emilyville, they go to Los Angeles to pursue their dreams of making it into the music industry. Meanwhile, Oscar, Igloo, and Kareem’s Father were on the hunt to go find Penny and Kareem. In the end, Penny and Kareem break up due to a huge disagreement about the music industry.
31	2	"The Diaper Academy"	Wolf-Rüdiger Bloss	LJ Lawrence	July 29, 2026	402
32	3	"Suga Mama Bomber"	Wolf-Rüdiger Bloss	Calvin Brown Jr.	July 29, 2026	403
When the Prouds find out Wizard Kelly’s Bombers is on a losing streak, Suga Mama stands up to audition and help the Bombers get back up on its feet. However, when Big Bone Broadnax finds out about Suga Mama's success, she tries to take her down.
33	4	"No Friend of Mine"	Lele Abreu Silva	Tiffany Thomas	July 29, 2026	404
Wizard Kelly introduces the Octopus Games. Before the games, Penny finds out LaCienega is dating Penny's ex-boyfriend, Kareem which upsets her because she is breaking girl code. To try and get back, she fakes date Frankie. Meanwhile, Oscar and Trudy find out that Felix and Sunset sell them out by joining Barry and Randall so Oscar and Trudy try to get revenge. This leads into a huge argument with Penny, LaCienega, Kareem, and Frankie plus another argument with Oscar, Trudy, Sunset, and Felix. When the octopus games starts they have to end up teaming up.
34	5	"Space Oddity"	Latoya Raveneau	Kylee Evans	July 29, 2026	405
35	6	"This House is Not Your Home"	Wolf-Rüdiger Bloss	LJ Lawrence	July 29, 2026	406
36	7	"V for Violence"	Lele Abreu Silva	Tiffany Thomas	July 29, 2026	407
37	8	"Dinosaurs and Donuts Land"	Wolf-Rüdiger Bloss	Zaire A. Davis	July 29, 2026	408
38	9	"Who Killed Mr. Chips"	Latoya Raveneau	Samira Fuller Farquhar	July 29, 2026	409
39	10	"Who Killed Mr. Chips"	Lele Abrea Silva	Samira Fuller Farquhar	July 29, 2026	410

== Shorts ==
=== Chibi Tiny Tales (2022–23) ===
Chibi Tiny Tales is a series of shorts that depict characters from various Disney Channel properties in chibi-style animation. Some shorts are crossovers with other Disney Channel series.

No.	Title	Original release date
1	"Big Thunder Mountain x The Proud Family"	November 12, 2022
2	"Penny Proud vs. LaCienega"	February 4, 2023
3	"Twin Troubles"	February 11, 2023
4	"Prune Wars"	February 18, 2023

=== How NOT to Draw (2023) ===
A series of shorts where a certain character from a Disney property, mainly a Disney Channel show, would usually do certain shenanigans as they request from the animator or the artist.

No.	Title	Original release date
1	"Suga Mama Cartoon Comes To Life!"	February 25, 2023

=== Theme Song Takeover (2023–25) ===
As part of a promotional campaign, Disney Channel began airing the Disney Theme Song Takeover, wherein supporting characters from different shows performed the theme song to the series they were in.

No.	Title	Original release date
1	"LaCienega"	September 16, 2023
2	"Suga Mama"	May 10, 2025
3	"Oscar"	June 14, 2025
