= Sheffield Theatres =

Theatre complex in Sheffield, South Yorkshire, England

Coordinates: 53.381°N 1.467°W

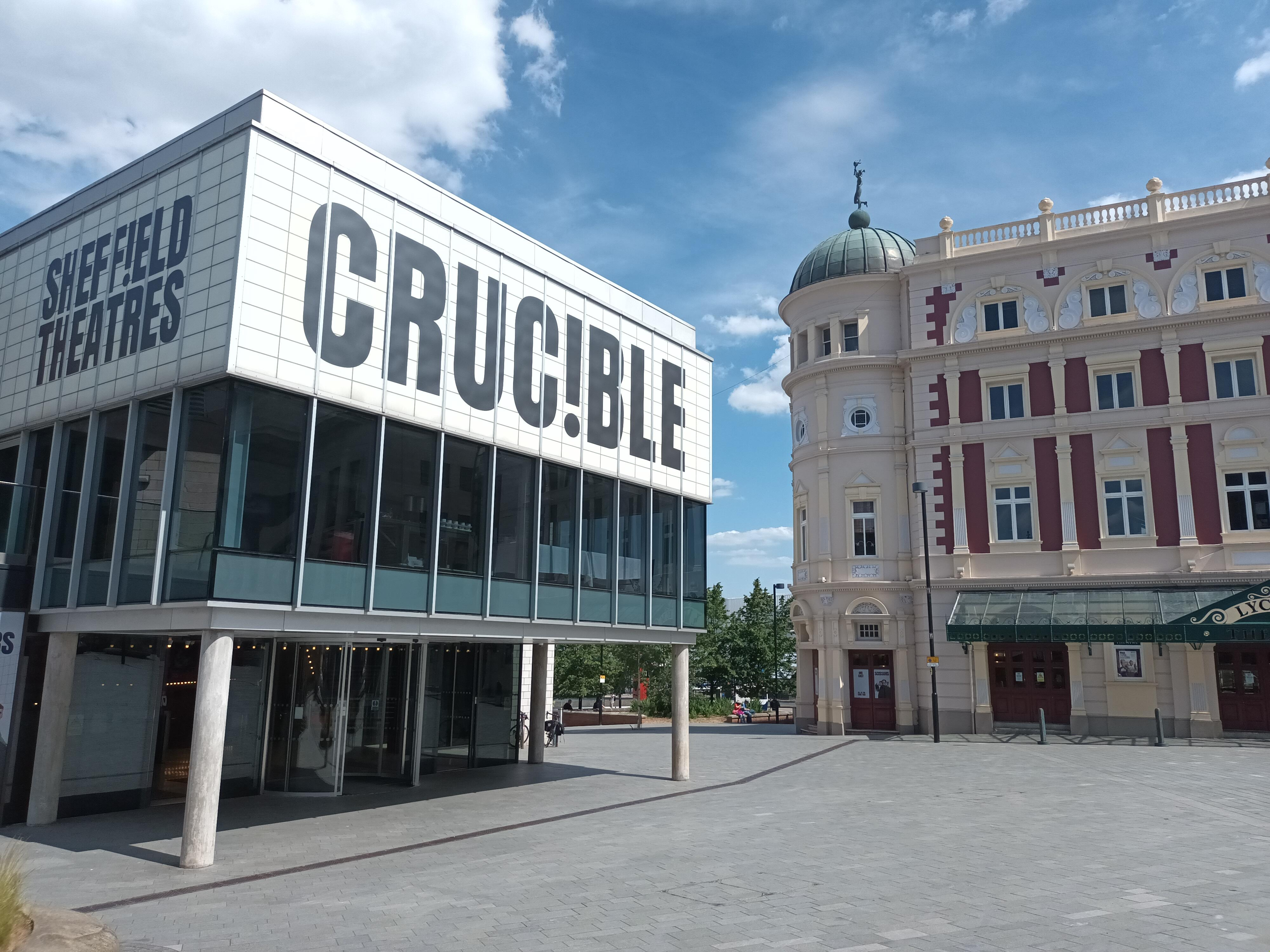
- Sheffield Theatres exterior showing the Crucible and Lyceum.
- Formation: 1971
- Type: Producing and receiving theatre company
- Location: Sheffield, South Yorkshire, England
- Artistic director: Elizabeth Newman
- Website: Official website

Sheffield Theatres is a theatre complex in Sheffield, South Yorkshire, England. It comprises four theatres: the Crucible, the Lyceum, the Tanya Moiseiwitsch Playhouse, and (as of January 2025) the Montgomery Theatre. These theatres make up the largest regional theatre complex outside the London region and show a variety of in-house and touring productions.

== Artistic Directors ==
- 1971 – 1974 – Colin George
- 1974 – 1981 – Peter James
- 1981 – 1992 – Clare Venables
- 1992 – 1994 – Michael Rudman
- 1995 – 2000 – Deborah Paige
- 2000 – 2005 – Michael Grandage
- 2005 – 2007 – Samuel West
- 2009 – 2016 – Daniel Evans
- 2016 – 2024 – Robert Hastie
- 2024 – present – Elizabeth Newman

== Production history ==
Sheffield Theatres' produced work is staged primarily in the Crucible and Tanya Moiseiwitsch Playhouse auditoriums.

Year	Crucible Theatre	Tanya Moiseiwitsch Playhouse	Other
2017	Everybody's Talking About Jamie by Tom MacRae with music and lyrics by Dan Gillespie Sells directed by Jonathan Butterell Julius Caesar by William Shakespeare directed by Robert Hastie What We Wished For by Chris Bush with music by Claire McKenzie directed by Emily Hutchinson Desire Under The Elms by Eugene O'Neill directed by Sam Yates The Wizard Of Oz by L. Frank Baum with music and lyrics by Harold Arlen and E. Y. Haburg directed by Robert Hastie	Musical Differences by Robin French directed by George Richmond-Scott as part of National Theatre Connections Tribes by Nina Raine directed by Kate Hewitt Uncle Vanya by Anton Chekhov translated by Peter Gill directed by Tamara Harvey in a co-production with Theatre Clwyd	
2018	Frost/Nixon by Peter Morgan directed by Kate Hewitt The York Realist by Peter Gill directed by Robert Hastie in a co-production with The Donmar Warehouse One Flew Over The Cuckoo's Nest by Dale Wasserman from the novel by Ken Kesey directed by Javaad Alipoor Songs From The Seven Hills by John Hollingworth with music and lyrics by Claire McKenzie and Scott Gilmour directed by Emily Hutchinson A Midsummer Night's Dream by William Shakespeare with music by Dan Gillespie Sells directed by Robert Hastie Kiss Me, Kate by Sam and Bella Spewack with music and lyrics by Cole Porter directed by Paul Foster	Chicken Soup by Ray Castleton and Kieran Knowles directed by Bryony Shanahan The Changing Room by Chris Bush directed by Emily Hutchinson as part of National Theatre Connections Love And Information by Caryl Churchill directed by Caroline Steinbeis Steel by Chris Bush directed by Rebecca Frecknall Close Quarters by Kate Bowen directed by Kate Wasserberg in a co-production with Out Of Joint	
2019	Rutherford & Son by Githa Sowerby directed by Caroline Steinbeis Standing At The Sky's Edge by Chris Bush with music and lyrics by Richard Hawley directed by Robert Hastie Life Of Pi by Lolita Chakrabarti from the novel by Yann Martel directed by Max Webster The Last King Of Scotland by Steve Waters from the novel by Giles Foden directed by Gbolahan Obisesan Guys And Dolls by Jo Swerling and Abe Burrows, with music and lyrics by Frank Loesser based on a story and characters of Damon Runyon, and directed by Robert Hastie	hang by debbie tucker green directed by Taio Lawson Stuff by Tom Wells directed by Emily Hutchinson as part of National Theatre Connections Reasons To Stay Alive by April De Angelis from the novel by Matt Haig directed by Jonathan Watkins My Mother Said I Never Should by Charlotte Keatley directed by Jeni Draper, a co-production with fingersmiths	
2020	Coriolanus by William Shakespeare, directed by Robert Hastie (this production closed early due to Covid-19 Pandemic lockdowns)	A Series of Public Apologies by John Donnelly, directed by Emily Hutchinson as part of National Theatre Connections Run Sister Run by Chloe Moss, in a co-production with Paines Plough and Soho Theatre (this production closed early due to Covid-19 Pandemic lockdowns)	
2021	The Band Plays On by Chris Bush, directed by Robert Hastie and Anthony Lau. Presented and distributed digitally. Talent by Victoria Wood, directed by Paul Foster Typical Girls by Morgan Lloyd Malcolm, directed by Róisín McBrinn She Loves Me by Joe Masteroff, music by Jerry Bock, and lyrics by Sheldon Harnick; directed by Robert Hastie	The Golden Fleece by Olivia Hirst, directed by Alex Mitchell; a 18–25 Young Company production created in partnership with Silent Uproar	
2022	Anna Karenina, from Helen Edmundson's adaptation, directed by Anthony Lau Rock / Paper / Scissors, a trio of interwoven original plays by Chris Bush, performed simultaneously by one cast across three venues with three creative/production team. Of which, Rock was performed in The Crucible. Much Ado About Nothing by William Shakespeare, directed by Robert Hastie; created in partnership with Ramps On The Moon The Contingency Plan, two plays by Steve Waters performed in rep, directed by Caroline Steinbeis and Chelsea Walker A remount of 2019's Standing At The Sky's Edge by Chris Bush with music and lyrics by Richard Hawley directed by Robert Hastie	Far Gone by John Rwothomack, directed by Mojisola Elufowoju; created in partnership with Roots Mbili Human Nurture by Ryan Calais Cameron, directed by Rob Watt; created in partnership with Theatre Centre Rock / Paper / Scissors, the play Scissors was performed in the Tanya Moiseiwitsch Playhouse. How A City Can Save The World by Stockroom, directed by Tess Seddon Accidental Death of an Anarchist by Dario Fo, in a new adaptation from Tom Basden, directed by Daniel Raggett	Rock / Paper / Scissors, the play Paper was performed in the Lyceum Theatre.
2023	The Good Person of Szechwan by Bertolt Brecht, in a new adaptation from Nina Segal, directed by Anthony Lau; created in partnership with Lyric Hammersmith and English Touring Theatre Miss Saigon by Claude-Michel Schönberg and Alain Boublil, with lyrics by Boublil and Richard Maltby Jr.; directed by Robert Hastie and Anthony Lau in the first major non-replica staging of the musical The Hypochondriac by Moliere, in an adaptation by Roger McGough; directed by Sarah Tipple White Christmas by David Ives and Paul Blake, with music and lyrics by Irving Berlin; directed by Paul Foster	Birds & Bees by Charlie Josephine, directed by Rob Watt; created in partnership with Theatre Centre Wildfire Road by Eve Leigh, directed by Laura Keefe Anna Hibiscus' Song by Atinuke, in an adaptation by Mojisola Elufowoju; created in partnership with Utopia Theatre We Could All Be Perfect by Hannah Morley, directed by Ruby Clarke	
2024	The Crucible by Arthur Miller and produced by Sheffield Theatres and staged in the iconic Crucible Theatre by Associate Artistic Director Anthony Lau Chariots of Fire, a new production of Mike Barlett's stage adaptation of the classic film directed by then outgoing Artistic Director Robert Hastie in his final production. A Doll's House by Henrik Ibsen, newly adapted by Chris Bush and directed by Elin Schofield. Little Shop of Horrors by Howard Ashman and Alan Menken, in a new production directed by Amy Hodge.	Wish You Weren't Here a new play by Katie Redford directed by Theatre Centre Artistic Director Rob Watt; created in partnership with Theatre Centre Lines created by Junaid Sarieddeen, John Rwothomack, Fidaa Zidan and Alexandra Aron with additional writing by Asiimwe Deborah Kawe; created in partnership with Roots Mbili and The Remote Theater Project Dizzy a new play by Mohamed-Zain Dada directed by Rob Watt and created in partnership with Theatre Centre. Kenrex, co-created by Jack Holden, Ed Stambollouian, and John Patrick Elliott.	
2025	A Streetcar Named Desire by Tennessee Williams, directed by Josh Seymour. Dancing at Lughnasa by Brian Friel, directed by Artistic Director Elizabeth Newman in her inaugural production at the venue and created in co-production with the Manchester Royal Exchange Theatre. A Christmas Carol by Charles Dickens, adapted by Aisha Khan and directed by Elin Schofield.	Pig-Heart Boy by Malorie Blackman, adapted for the stage by Winsome Pinnock and directed by Tristan Fynn-Aiduenu. Consumed, a new play by Karis Kelly and winner of the 2022 Women's Prize for Playwriting. Directed by Katie Posner and presented in co-production with Paines Plough and Belgrade Theatre.	
2026	The Ladies Football Club by Stefano Massini, adapted by Tim Firth and directed by Elizabeth Newman. Summer Holiday by Michael Gyngell and Mark Haddigan and adapted from the film of the same name, directed by Elizabeth Newman and Ben Occhipinti and presented in association with Blackpool Grand Theatre. Singin' in the Rain, based on the film of the same name, directed by Jonathan Church.	My Brother's A Genius by Debris Stevenson and directed by Theatre Centre Artistic Director Eleanor Manners; created in partnership with Theatre Centre. Living, a new play by Leo Butler and directed by Abigail Graham.	

== Pinter: A Celebration ==
Sheffield Theatres' programme Pinter: A Celebration took place from 11 October to 11 November 2006. The programme featured selected productions of Harold Pinter's plays, in order of presentation: The Caretaker, No Man's Land, Family Voices, Tea Party, The Room, One for the Road and The Dumb Waiter. These films (mostly his screenplays; some in which Pinter appears as an actor) were shown: The Go-Between, Accident, The Birthday Party, The French Lieutenant's Woman, Reunion, Mojo, The Servant and The Pumpkin Eater.

Pinter: A Celebration also included other related programme events: "Pause for Thought" (Penelope Wilton and Douglas Hodge in conversation with Michael Billington), "Ashes to Ashes – A Cricketing Celebration", a "Pinter Quiz Night", "The New World Order", the BBC Two documentary film Arena: Harold Pinter (introduced by Anthony Wall, producer of Arena), and "The New World Order – A Pause for Peace" (a consideration of "Pinter's pacifist writing" [both poems and prose] supported by the Sheffield Quakers), and a screening of "Pinter's passionate and antagonistic 45-minute Nobel Prize Lecture."
