= The Trial of Tony Blair =

2007 satirical drama

- Created by: Alistair Beaton
- Directed by: Simon Cellan Jones
- Starring: Robert Lindsay; Phoebe Nicholls; Peter Mullan; Alexander Armstrong
- Country of origin: United Kingdom
- Original language: English

Production
- Running time: 72 minutes

Original release
- Network: More4
- Release: 15 January 2007

The Trial of Tony Blair is a satirical drama depicting war crimes proceedings brought against former British prime minister Tony Blair by an international tribunal, following his departure from 10 Downing Street. Directed by Simon Cellan Jones, it was first aired on More4 on 15 January 2007 and repeated on 5 March 2007 and during Blair's last week as prime minister on 23 June 2007.

The programme is set in 2010 and stars Robert Lindsay as Tony Blair, Phoebe Nicholls as Cherie Blair, Peter Mullan as Gordon Brown and Alexander Armstrong as David Cameron.

== Synopsis ==
A short time before the 2010 general election, Tony Blair goes on British television and gives a political broadcast, in which he announces his resignation as Prime Minister of the United Kingdom.

The Labour Party, of which Blair is leader, is trailing David Cameron's Conservative Party in the polls. However, within hours of Blair's departure, the polling trends dramatically reverse with respondents overwhelmingly supporting Labour's new leader, Gordon Brown. Fearing that his legacy is under severe threat, Blair attempts to sabotage Labour's election campaign, leaking an inflammatory e-mail sent from Brown to Blair wherein the former admits that tax hikes are "inevitable". Blair's plan works, in that Labour wins the election with a majority of just two Members of Parliament, smaller than Blair's majority.

Meanwhile, Blair is having problems of his own. Both he and his wife, Cherie, are having financial problems, exacerbated by his renting of capacious Central London offices and his rejection of a book deal for his memoirs after the publisher insists that it include more details about Iraq. He is obsessed with his legacy, but neither his former supporters nor the US government – led by President Hillary Clinton – want anything to do with him. Finally, Blair is haunted by disturbing visions of dead Iraqi civilians and British soldiers in the ongoing Iraq War. His troubled conscience makes him try to convert to Catholicism, though in repeated visits to church he finds himself unable to confess to any sins. Blair is portrayed as being partly in denial that a world which once hailed him as a great leader has largely turned against him.

To compound Blair's problems, the International Criminal Court is looking to bring war crimes charges against British and US leaders in relation to the war. Now that Blair is no longer prime minister, he no longer has diplomatic immunity from prosecution, and since George W. Bush cannot be prosecuted because the US is not an ICC signatory, Blair would become the main defendant of any such trial. Brown is initially uncertain of what to do, but his hand is ultimately forced when he is informed that several Labour MPs have threatened to defect to the Liberal Democrats – thereby eliminating Labour's razor-thin majority – if he fails to act.

The United Nations Security Council votes on the decision to bring Blair to court. Ordinarily, this would not have been an issue as the United Kingdom, a permanent member of the Security Council, would have been able to veto the resolution. Unfortunately for Blair, Brown's assistant orders the UK's Security Council representative to be absent when the resolution is voted on (as explicitly voting either way would have been damaging). The resolution passes, with all other Security Council members – including the United States – voting in favour.

Under the stress of events, Blair suffers a recurrence of heart problems, but everybody believes this is play-acting. Whilst visiting Blair in hospital, Brown informs Blair that he could not risk him touring the globe, causing further chaos. Whilst Brown states that voters want honesty rather than charisma, Blair retorts that instead they got Brown. The programme ends with Blair being flown to his trial in The Hague.

== Historical changes for the programme ==
Several historical events have taken place before the programme begins. These include the following:

- Tony Blair staying in power until 2010. He gave notice that he would resign as prime minister by mid-2007, and refined this to 27 June on 10 May. This is explained at the beginning of the programme, when Blair announces that because of military action by British, US and Israeli armed forces against Iran followed by suicide bombings in the UK, he needed to remain in power to ensure "stability" in the country.
- Hillary Clinton has won the 2008 presidential election and is now President of the United States. To hold onto her position, she agrees to vote in favour of the UN resolution which sees Tony sent to trial.
- Arnold Schwarzenegger is seen in photos at the UN building in New York as the latest Secretary-General, following Kofi Annan. Like the other two points, this is more for humour than accuracy, as Annan's successor was already known to be Ban Ki-moon.

== Principal characters ==
Whilst the programme focuses mainly on Tony Blair, people such as David Cameron, Gordon Brown, Cherie Blair and Brian Haw are regularly shown.

- David Cameron is shown as a politician believing in nothing and promoting everything – an accusation made against him by numerous newspapers in the UK.
- Gordon Brown is shown as moody and insecure. He is pressured into allowing the UN resolution to pass.
- Cherie Blair is shown, complete with her career as a leading barrister and her chambers.
- Brian Haw is a minor character, who takes to sitting outside the Blairs' home in Connaught Square, London, shouting "War Criminal" every time Tony or Cherie appear.

== Reception ==
Blair was still heading the British government when the film was first broadcast. A few days later, The Economist noted that "the prime minister could not be expected to join in the general merriment" about "the eponymous villain" being charged with war crimes.

== See also ==
- Cultural depictions of Tony Blair
