= TONY! The Blair Musical =

English satirical musical

TONY!
- The Blair Musical
- TONY! The Blair Musical poster.
- Music: Ian McCluskey
- Lyrics: Chris Bush
- Book: Chris Bush
- Basis: Tony Blair's election wins, premiership and resignation
- Productions: 2007 Theatre Royal, York, England; 2007 C Venues, Edinburgh, Scotland

TONY! The Blair Musical is a satirical comedy musical written in 2007 by Chris Bush, director of the White Rose Theatre, with music composed by Ian McCluskey. TONY! follows the premiership of former British prime minister Tony Blair from his landslide election in 1997 to his resignation ten years later.

It is told to the audience by Blair himself, in the form of an interplay of spotlit monologues and musical flashbacks to various moments in the former prime minister's career. The musical focuses primarily on Blair's relationships with the key characters in his life, rather than the politics, including his Chancellor and successor as Prime Minister Gordon Brown and wife Cherie Booth. It is a musically eclectic production, featuring rock pieces, power ballads and a barbershop quartet of former Tory leaders. Performed at York's Theatre Royal, the Edinburgh Fringe and the Pleasance Theatre, Islington, TONY! has been described by the BBC as "sharp, engaging and original," and as "a shining example of honest comedy writing." It has also been criticized for crude caricatures and cheap one-liners. Nonetheless, the play won the NSDF & Pleasance Edinburgh Competition 2007. As part of the prize the production transferred to the Pleasance Theatre, Islington, for a limited run in late September 2007.

The production returned to the Edinburgh Fringe in August 2008, alongside its sequel Tony of Arabia. Previews were performed at the Oxford North Wall and the Theatre Royal, Wakefield, in July 2008.

== Synopsis ==
The production begins with a news reporter announcing the fall of Tony Blair, before the erstwhile prime minister is carried onstage, funeral-style, by four pallbearers, to melancholic chants of "Tony!". He is then thrown to the ground to the crash of a drum fill, where he begins to sing the opening number, "Tony's Entrance," in which he declares his intention to recount the past ten years of his career to the audience, while the ex-pallbearers perform an ironic 1990s boy band-style dance. It then returns to Blair's election victory in 1997, in which he waves to adoring crowds and congratulates deputy prime minister John Prescott and chancellor Gordon Brown on their success. An aide then arrives to tell him the people are calling for him, at which point a second aide rushes on with a guitar for him to play. A single spotlight then illuminates Tony for his first monologue, in which he tells of the wonder of these first glorious days in power, and of how he became the 'people's prime minister.' He then kneels to pray, attempting to sneakily ask God for a report on how he's doing so far, before being interrupted by the angelic ghost of Diana, Princess of Wales. A clearly uninterested Diana tells him to become the next princess, the people's prime minister, and then warns him against a future of joining George W. Bush in invading Iraq, before drifting mysteriously away, leaving a completely nonplussed Tony in the spotlight.

Although bewildered by Diana's "cryptic prophecies," Tony realises his destiny as prime minister, and sits purposefully at his desk to begin work. His wife Cherie then enters to visit, but is indifferently shunted to one side to make way for the entrance of Peter Mandelson, Tony's closest advisor, who is portrayed as a camp and serpentine character and brings a homoerotic element to the Blair story. Bathed in a soft, romantic light, Tony and Peter both tell the audience of their mutual admiration. They exit the stage, leaving a rejected Cherie to sing the poignant "No Me In Tony," a theme which is reprised by various characters throughout the production. Tony re-enters with a jealous Peter, before being joined by Gordon Brown, who probingly raises the issue of their deal (for Tony to hand over the premiership to Gordon in due course), their "little chat." Tony reassures Gordon that he will keep his promise and exits, leaving Gordon, Peter and John Prescott to sing the jolly piece, "My Mate Tony." Tony returns from a holiday in Italy, and the four talk of their plans to bring the party to the people, before singing the playful "Open Politics," in which they gradually realise that, despite good intentions, there is in fact nothing they ever wish to talk about with the public.

Tony then tells the audience of his need to bring in "a professional" to better his public image and introduces the notorious spin-doctor Alastair Campbell. Although the others are sceptical, Tony is totally taken in by Alastair's promises of glory and together the two of them sing "Evita Peron," an overdriven song in which Tony narcissistically declares himself to be the love-child of Madonna and Martin Luther King. So pleased is he with Campbell that he decides to let go of Peter, abandoning him on stage to reprise "No Me In Tony." Once again in the spotlight, Tony recounts to the audience how the Conservative opposition was no competition, before a barbershop quartet of former Tory leaders - John Major, William Hague, Iain Duncan Smith and Michael Howard - shuffle on stage in boaters to sing their comic song in which they lament how they all fell foul of Mr. Blair. After this, Tony introduces George W. Bush with a recitative, who bounces on stage as a delinquent cowboy with a toy horse and screeches the bluesy song "George's Entrance." As with Campbell, Tony is taken with the gutsy George, though as the president leaves, Gordon once again enters to moodily remind Tony of their deal, and scold him for forgetting his own people. After a heated exchange, Gordon pleads to Tony with the moving "We Had A Deal," reminding his friend of how things used to be. An almost heartbroken Tony remembers how much his old friend means to him, but refuses to acquiesce, and a defeated Gordon strides out.

The disturbed Tony then suffers a heart murmur, and is hospitalised. Cherie joins him and begs him to slow down and think of his family, in the song "Hand Of History," but, in the same number, Tony insists he has a destiny and refuses to give up, and, like Gordon before her, Cherie leaves disappointed. An excited George Bush returns and the pair exchange various crude jokes on the subject of Islamic extremists and the like. However, their fun is interrupted by an unimpressed Campbell, who informs Tony that there is no more he can do to save Tony's flagging image. At the end of his tether, Tony dismisses him, and Campbell reprises "No Me In Tony" for the final time, joined on stage by Cherie, Peter and Gordon. As they all dejectedly leave, a departing Campbell tells Tony of his imminent appearance on Newsnight with the dreaded interviewer Jeremy Paxman. The thundering rock number "Newsnight" then begins, in which Tony is grilled by Paxman, and, without Campbell's help, completely flounders. Tony is then left alone on stage to tell the audience that all political leaders make mistakes, but attempts to convince them of his much-admired integrity. However, in a nightmare sequence, he is again interrupted by Gordon with a reprise of "We Had A Deal," and, gradually, Peter, Campbell and George return and revive various themes in a final medley. The appearance of Diana telling Tony that he has let the people down is the final straw, yet, even at the last, he pathetically reprises a desperate version of "Evita Peron" as everyone leaves him alone on stage.

The solitary Tony then breaks down in tears, but is disturbed by a little boy - Tom - who asks him why he is crying and tells him he's come with his family to meet the prime minister. Realising that Tom means him, Tony lets the boy sit in his office chair, from which he begins a long-winded monologue about his daddy's views on politics, concluding that his daddy thinks Tony is "a star." Establishing that Tom's daddy wasn't given a peerage, Tony gives him a present - his prize guitar - and begins to sing the anthemic finale song "Faith." The entire cast then join him on stage for the final chords, and a reinvigorated Tony tells Gordon that he's going to go for it one more time as the musical ends.

=== Musical numbers ===
- Prelude/Tony's Entrance - Tony and Chorus
- No Me In Tony - Cherie Booth
- My Mate Tony - Gordon Brown, John Prescott and Peter Mandelson
- Open Politics - Tony, Gordon, John and Peter
- I Am Evita Peron - Tony and Alastair Campbell
- I Did It For Tony (2008 Edinburgh Fringe) - Alastair and Peter
- No Me In Tony (Reprise) - Peter
- Tory Barbershop Quartet - John Major, William Hague, Iain Duncan Smith and Michael Howard
- George's Entrance - George W. Bush
- We Had A Deal - Tony and Gordon
- The Hand Of History - Tony and Cherie
- No Me In Tony (Reprise 2) - Alastair, Cherie, Gordon and Peter
- Newsnight - Jeremy Paxman, Wife and Husband
- Medley/Diana's Lament - Gordon, Alastair, Peter, George and the ghost of Princess Diana
- I Am Evita Peron (Reprise) - Tony
- Faith/Finale - Tony and Chorus

== Characters ==
Listed in order of appearance

- News Reporter
- Tony Blair, the Prime Minister of the United Kingdom and lead figure of the musical. Blair is portrayed as a character of conviction and decency, though as a slightly weak individual who is easily impressed by superficial characters like Alastair Campbell and George W. Bush, who promise glitz and glamour.
- Gordon Brown, the chancellor of the Exchequer, and a solemn and resentful figure who is obsessed by Tony's promise that he will soon hand over the premiership to him.
- John Prescott, the deputy prime minister and blustering, though confident, idiot of a man who speaks nothing but utter nonsense.
- Princess Diana, the late princess of Wales who disinterestedly returns from the dead as the Official Goodwill Ambassador for the Afterlife to guide Tony on his mission as man of the people.
- Cherie Booth, Tony's wife, who, although devoted to her husband, finds herself pushed to one side to make way for his career and close colleagues.
- Peter Mandelson, a close advisor to Tony, who is portrayed as camp and vaguely sinister, and deeply in love with his master.
- Alastair Campbell, Tony's Machiavellian spin-doctor, and a manipulative, superior and amoral man.
- John Major, the first of the former Tory leaders.
- William Hague, the second of the former Tory leaders.
- Iain Duncan Smith, the third of the former Tory leaders, who, in fact, confuses himself with William Hague and ruins the first attempt at the song.
- Michael Howard, the fourth and most evil of the former Tory leaders.
- George W. Bush, the ludicrously simple and childish president of the United States, who wins over Tony instantly with the glamour of America. While the original actor, Alex Stevens, portrayed Bush as a delinquent toddler, Gavin Whitworth (who took up the role in 2008) was much truer to Bush's actual mannerisms, giving the character a more sinister and self-assured edge.
- Jeremy Paxman, the aggressive presenter of Newsnight, the news review programme, who relentlessly grills Tony on the failings of his premiership.
- Wife, a woman ('Mrs. Harriet Jones') who complains on Newsnight to Tony about her and her husband's failed pension schemes.
- Husband, her partner, who also tells the prime minister of how they cannot afford university top-up fees and of how his eldest son is fighting in Iraq.
- Tom, the innocent little boy who meets Tony after his resignation and tells him how much he and his 'daddy' admire him.

=== Original Edinburgh Fringe cast ===
- James Duckworth as Tony Blair
- Michael Slater as Gordon Brown, Michael Howard and Jeremy Paxman
- Alex Stevens as John Prescott, William Hague, George W. Bush and Husband
- Ellie Cox as Princess Diana, Cherie Booth and Wife
- Jethro Compton as Peter Mandelson, John Major and Tom
- Ed Duncan Smith as Alastair Campbell, Iain Duncan Smith and News Reporter

=== 2008 cast ===
- James Duckworth as Tony Blair
- Michael Slater as Gordon Brown, Michael Howard and Jeremy Paxman
- Gavin Whitworth as John Prescott, William Hague, George W. Bush and Husband
- Ellie Cox/Alice Boagey as Princess Diana, Cherie Booth and Wife (Boagey performed during the July previews and once during the Edinburgh festival)
- Jethro Compton as Peter Mandelson, John Major and Tom
- Ed Duncan Smith as Alastair Campbell, Iain Duncan Smith and News Reporter

== Cuts and additions ==
When the production moved from the Theatre Royal in York to the Edinburgh Fringe, time constraints forced the director, Chris Bush, to make several cuts from the original script. Songs that were cut included:

- Tony's Theme, a simple rock piece in which Tony, instead of giving a speech to the adoring crowds, is encouraged by his colleagues to sing a song for them. With guitar in hand, he introduces his "average-Joe-public-school-boy" character and his ambitions as a youthful, people's prime minister. The song features soon after "Tony's Entrance," before the scene between Tony and the ghost of Princess Diana.
- War! a song about the Iraq War in which George W. Bush cheerily fires up Tony and sings optimistically about the situation in Iraq, while a trio of war-weary soldiers alternate between chants of "war!" and mournful laments about their dire circumstances. The loss of this song caused the Iraq element of Tony Blair's premiership to be almost entirely sidelined.

However, when the production was transferred to the Pleasance Theatre in Islington from 19 to 22 September 2007, the above songs were re-included. In addition, Bush and McCluskey added another song, "I Did It For Tony," a jazzy number in which Alastair Campbell and Peter Mandelson argue over each other's rightful place as Tony's true henchman, and Campbell bullies Mandelson about his homosexuality. The song features after "I Am Evita Peron," immediately before Mandelson's dismissal. When the show returned to the 2008 Edinburgh festival, the cuts and "I Did It For Tony" were retained.

== See also ==
- Cultural depictions of Tony Blair
- Keating! – Sung-through musical portraying Paul Keating
