= Home School (The Proud Family: Louder and Prouder) =

- The Proud Family: Louder and Prouder episode
- Episode no.: Season 1 Episode 8
- Directed by: Tara Whitaker
- Written by: Tiffany Thomas
- Production code: 108
- Original release date: April 6, 2022

Guest appearance
- Tiffany Haddish as Ms. Hill

Episode chronology
← Previous "When You Wish Upon a Roker"	Next → "Raging Bully"

"Home School" is the eighth episode of the first season of the American animated sitcom The Proud Family: Louder and Prouder. It was released to Disney+ on April 6, 2022, and later premiered on Disney Channel on January 28, 2023.

In the episode, Penny Proud inadvertently gets her homeless teacher Ms. Hill fired after a series of hijinks. "Home School" was directed by Tara Whitaker and written by Tiffany Thomas. Tiffany Haddish guest stars as Ms. Hill.

== Plot ==
The kids get the mean Ms. Hill as their substitute teacher. In the evening, Penny realizes that she forgot her cellphone in detention and sneaks into the school to get it, only to find that Ms. Hill is homeless and lives in the teacher's lounge. She tells her friends the next day not to let anyone know, but Dijonay blabs about it; causing Ms. Hill to get fired and live in her car. Meanwhile, Zoey is made drum major, despite her not having any rhythm, and seeks out Bobby to help train her in the ways of the funk. Feeling guilty, Penny invites Ms. Hill to stay with her and her family, but quickly regrets it as she is a bossy teacher even when not working. She decides to hold a fundraiser to get Ms. Hill back on her feet, but no one at the school assembly will help, that is until Zoey uses what Bobby taught her to excite the crowd into donating. Ms. Hill happily thanks Penny for the donation and rekindles her romantic relationship with Bobby, who was her prom date back in high school.

== Reception ==
"Home School" received positive critical reviews. John Schwarz of Bubbleblabber rated the episode an eight out of ten, stating, "this week’s episode focuses on the ridiculously low salaries that teachers make working in public schools and the show makes a fabulous point about what we consider important versus what is really important." Branyan Towe of Loud and Clear Reviews gave a positive review, stating that the episode "stands out in a lot of ways, from its lack of a moral to its superb blending of two plots that don’t seem like they would work together."
