= Illyria (play) =

Play written by Bryony Lavery

Illyria is a play by Bryony Lavery, written in 2002 and published along with a collection of other plays in the book Plays One in 2007.

The title of the play descends from Shakespeare's play Twelfth Night, which is also set in a country called "Illyria". Some allusions to Shakespeare's play can be found in the play, such as intertextual quotes from the original Shakespearan play, as well as some characters who share the same names as characters from Twelfth Night.

The play tells the story of the British journalist Maria Vargas, who is sent to the country of Illyria to interview the wife of the country's dictator. However, things don’t go according to the plan and Maria suddenly finds herself in the middle of a world of darkness, violence and torture in the war-torn country of Illyria.

The original 2002 production for the National Theatre Connections festival was directed by La Mór.

== Summary ==
A British journalist, Maria Vargas, comes to the once beautiful, but now war struck country of Illyria. Maria meets her translator Magda, who tells her about the country and how it used to be, while they travel in a car to her supposed destination. However, all of a sudden Magda is shot in the head by a sniper rifle and dies. After that, Maria is taken to her assumed goal by the drivers, but without a translator, she is now unable to understand the people around her. She encounters the cleaning women Marie-Therese, Theresa and Mary, who ignore her because they do not speak her language.

While cleaning the house, Marie-Therese tells the other two women horrible stories about cruel soldiers, who torture and rape helpless women or kill innocent children and animals during these times of war. Three soldiers named Violent, Obseno and Fabian come in and notice the foreign Maria; then they observe the house and have a conversation about signs of war on it. Suddenly, a car with Madame, the mistress of the Generalissimo, the country’s dictator arrives. The cleaning women quickly go back to work to make everything ready, comparing themselves to ants that have to serve a “fat ant queen”. Lapin, a bureaucrat of the Generalissimo, arrives and checks and criticizes the place before Madame can be brought in. Marie-Therese, Theresa and Mary comment on how they hate Lapin and how they wish for a better life, but Lapin overhears this and tells them that they will never achieve this.

Lapin notices Maria, who tells her that she came to do an interview with Madame. Maria asks for a new translator and tells them that Magda, the last one was killed by rifle fire. Two more soldiers, Feste and Andreas, enter. Finally, accompanied by the secretary Conrad, Madame arrives, dressed in expensive clothing. She is described to look like a moth in a cocoon. Madame is immediately tended by the servant women. Maria Vargas notices that this is not the person she has come to interview and that she has been brought to the wrong place – she came to interview the General’s wife, not his mistress! Madame appears to be a vain person, who only seems to be interested in her looks and in her love for the Generalissimo – she does not seem to notice or care that the citizens of Illyria hate her. On her way to the house, her car has been attacked by angry Illyrians.

The bureaucrats Lapin and Conrad appear to have an affair and have sex, while the soldiers Violent and Obseno secretly watch them. Meanwhile, Maria tries to explain to Fabian that she has been brought to the wrong place and also tells him about her personal life, also mentioning that she is pregnant after she had to puke in front of him. Lapin tells everyone in the house, that the Generalissimo is on his way and the place is immediately prepared for his arrival. Portraits of the Generalissimo and flags are put up everywhere, while the servant women take care of Madame, dressing her in beautiful, sexual clothes. Madame wants to see her collection of shoes before the dictator arrives and insists on this wish. During the presentation of shoes, Maria Vargas tries to interview Madame, but Conrad sabotages the interview and translates wrongly. He only asks Madame Questions about her shoes, rather than the political questions Maria had actually asked. Madame deems Maria to be uninteresting.

Suddenly, a revolution seems to have taken place. The Illyrian citizens outside rebel and the soldiers quickly remove the flags, portraits, etc. of the Generalissimo, while the serving women pillage the house. Exclaiming, that ‘everything belongs to everyone now’, some of the soldiers (Feste and Andreas) focus on Madame and take her away to rape her. Maria is also approached by the other soldiers (Violent, Obseno and Fabian), but when she tells them she’s ‘a journalist, British, protected, an official and pregnant, she’s left alone. Conrad excuses the soldiers, saying that it’s the war’s fault and that the boys are neither civilized nor educated. Madame comes back, traumatized, and starts to see an imaginary shoemaker in the corner of the room who talks to her. She then overhears Marie-Therese talking about a crazy woman who saw exactly what she has just seen, and supposedly having turned crazy, faints.

The women in the house gather and decide to kill Madame, for she is the last thing remaining of the old regime – however, they cannot do it after all. Madame wakes up again and notices that they wanted to kill her. She tells them that it would be okay to kill her and finally breaks down, after claiming that she does not love the Generalissimo anymore. Marie-Therese states that Madame is heartbroken, just like any other normal woman.

Madame and the others start to read books by famous authors about happy endings, new beginnings and peace. The soldiers return and tell them, that the Generalissimo is dead. Madame slaps the soldiers who raped her, claiming it to be her revenge. But then she forgives them and offers them something to eat, this time serving her former servants.

Maria talks about the time after she left Illyria and has her baby. She is glad that it will be able to grow up in safety and peace. In the end, Madame comments that she has been idle and lazy before, but that she is now ready for a new beginning, while the other Illyrians stay by her side.
