= The Curve =

The Curve may refer to:

- The Curve (1998 film), a thriller film
- The Curve (2020 film), a documentary film
- The Curve (shopping mall), a shopping mall in Malaysia
- The Curve, an African-American district in Memphis, Tennessee, named after a bend in the streetcar line
- The Curve, an art gallery within the Barbican Centre, London, UK
- Epidemic curve, referred to as "the curve" in discussion of the 2019–20 coronavirus pandemic

== See also ==
- Curve (disambiguation)
