= Curve (design magazine) =

- Managing Editor: Belinda Stening
- Categories: Design magazines
- Publisher: Belinda Stening
- First issue: 2002
- Company: Beesting Communications Pty Ltd
- Country: Australia
- Based in: Melbourne
- Language: English
- Website: www.curvelive.com
- ISSN: 1446-4829

Curve is a magazine about industrial design and product design. Published quarterly since 2002, it features interviews and profiles with designers, product developers and manufacturers, as well as coverage of new materials, technologies and trends in industrial design.

Curve editions published from 2002 to 2014 can be viewed on the website in an online archive, open to the public and free of charge. The website also features a blog covering industrial design and product design news and the latest product technologies and innovations.

Curve was founded by industrial designer, Belinda Stening and published by Beesting Communications Pty Ltd based in Melbourne, Australia.

== Notable designers profiled in Curve ==
- Alberto Alessi
- Chris Bangle
- Yves Béhar
- Christoph Behling
- Kazuo Kawasaki
- Rem Koolhaus
- Ravi Sawhney
- Peter Schreyer
- Marcel Wanders
- Peter Zec
- Zaha Hadid
- Stefano Marzano
