= Sputnik Sweetheart =

Novel by Haruki Murakami

- First edition (Japanese)
- Author: Haruki Murakami
- Original title: スプートニクの恋人 (Supūtoniku no Koibito)
- Translator: Philip Gabriel
- Language: Japanese
- Publisher: Kodansha
- Publication date: 1999
- Publication place: Japan
- English publication date: April 2001
- Media type: Print (Hardcover)
- Pages: 229
- ISBN: 1-86046-825-X
- OCLC: 45990714

Sputnik Sweetheart (スプートニクの恋人, Supūtoniku no Koibito) is a novel by Haruki Murakami, published in Japan, by Kodansha, in 1999. An English translation by Philip Gabriel was then published in 2001.

== Plot summary ==
Sumire is an aspiring writer who survives on a family stipend and the creative input of her only friend, the novel's male narrator and protagonist, known in the text only as 'K'. K is an elementary school teacher, 25 years old, and in love with Sumire, though she does not quite share his feelings. At a wedding, Sumire meets an ethnic Korean woman, Miu, who is 17 years her senior. The two strike up a conversation and Sumire finds herself attracted to the older woman. This is the first time she has ever been sexually drawn to anybody. Miu soon asks Sumire to come work for her. This meeting and the ensuing relationship between the women leads to Sumire changing: she starts wearing nicer clothes, gets a better apartment, and quits smoking; however, she also develops a writer's block.

K suddenly begins to receive letters from Europe written by Sumire. With them, he is able to track Sumire's and Miu's business travels across the continent. In her last letter, Sumire mentions that instead of coming home as originally planned, she and Miu are to spend some extra time on a Greek island vacationing.

After a short while, K begins to call Sumire's house wondering when she will return. The only answer he gets, however, is from her answering machine. He soon gets a surprising call from Miu, who asks him to fly to Greece and mentions that something has happened to Sumire. Miu doesn't explain much, but it's clear the matter is urgent. The connection is shabby, and their phone connection is soon lost.

K's new school year is starting the week after Miu's call, but finding Sumire's well-being more important, he leaves for Greece the next day. He meets Miu for the first time, and she tells him that Sumire has vanished without a trace. She tells him about the string of events that led to the point of Sumire's disappearance, in which Miu was unable to reciprocate physically when Sumire initiated a sexual encounter. Miu is very pleased to have K around, but worries that Sumire may have committed suicide; K reassures her that Sumire would not do that.

Miu leaves the island for Athens in order to get help from the Japanese embassy and to call Sumire's parents. K spends a day on the island thinking about Sumire and her fate, coming to a realization that there might be some clue in Sumire's writing that Miu mentioned. He finds Sumire's computer and a floppy disk that contains two documents, named simply "Document 1" and "Document 2". One contains Sumire's writing about a dream of hers in which she tries and fails to reach a version of her mother, who died when Sumire was young. The other is a story that Miu told her about an event that transformed her 14 years ago. She was trapped in a Ferris wheel overnight and, using her binoculars to see inside her nearby apartment, witnessed another version of herself having a disturbing sexual encounter with a man. The event caused her hair to turn completely white and divested her of sexual urges. Miu says that she feels that she was split in two on that night, and has lost that other part of herself forever. Trying hard to connect the dots, K concludes that both the stories suggest the existence of multiple worlds, and Sumire has left this world and entered a parallel one, perhaps to be with the other version of Miu. He then has a mystical experience during the night.

Miu returns after a couple of days. K feels his time there is up, even though he feels a connection to Miu. Going back to Japan, he returns to his everyday life. In Sumire's absence, however, he feels he has lost the only precious thing in his life. He receives another distressed call, this time from his girlfriend who is also a married mother of one of his students. She tells him that her son – a boy nicknamed "Carrot" – had been caught stealing in a supermarket a few times, and she needs his help in order to convince the security guard to let him go without contacting the police. The security guard is unhappy with both Carrot's lack of regret for his crime and K's outward appearance and manner, which he perceives to be one of an easy lifestyle. After a tedious conversation wherein the guard chastises K for his attitude toward him, he lets Carrot go. K sends the mother home and takes Carrot to a coffee shop. Carrot doesn't say anything the whole time. Even so, feeling a sort of connection to him, K tells him the story about Sumire. After dropping Carrot at his mother's house, K tells her that he cannot see her anymore.

He continues with his solitary life. Despite their promises to the contrary, he never sees Miu again except for one chance encounter: Miu drives past him in her Jaguar but doesn't seem to acknowledge he is there. She has stopped dyeing her hair, and it is now pure white. K senses she is now an "empty shell," lacking what both Sumire and K were once drawn to about her.

Without warning, K receives a phone call from Sumire, who tells him that she is in the same phone booth near her apartment that she had always called him from. She asks him to come to get her from the phone booth. As with other Murakami works, Sputnik Sweetheart lacks a clear, concise ending.

== Critical reception ==
Kirkus Reviews wrote that "worlds of implication exfoliate from this stunning, beautifully structured novel: a moving depiction of the mystery of other people, ever capable of 'disappearing' into 'places' where we cannot, try as we may, follow them." Publishers Weekly said, of the seventh translation to be provided to Murakami's English readership, "His latest offering breaks no new ground but is packaged in a striking manner and should attract a few newcomers."

Daniel Zalewski, in The New York Times, remarked on the book's tone: "At this more mature stage in his career, Murakami speaks in a subtler language, one that blankets the internal and external world with melancholy." Julie Myerson, in The Guardian, said that Murakami "surely accomplishes the best, most unnerving job of fiction: to force you to look hard at the parts of yourself you never even suspected were there."

== Themes ==
Murakami explores familiar themes such as the effects of unrequited love, growing up emotionally stunted in an overwhelmingly conformist society, and the conflict between following one's dreams and clamping down on them in order to assimilate into society.

While Sumire is an emotional and spontaneous individual who often appears to be a misfit in society, "K", the narrator, is a person who has through sheer force of will moulded himself into another person, one who integrates seamlessly into the wider society and culture around him, and the transition leaves him emotionally stunted and unable to express his feelings. When Sumire is also, through her interaction with Miu, forcibly shaped into a person other than she is, the transformation is neither permanent nor successful.

As in The Wind-Up Bird Chronicle and Dance Dance Dance, Murakami uses (or rather, suggests) alternate worlds as a plot device. "K", the narrator, is a markedly different protagonist from those of Murakami's other novels. He is considerably less given to or adept at wisecracks, maintains a respectable and stable profession as a schoolteacher, and is less self-confident and much more introverted and conflicted than any other Murakami protagonist.

Many elements of the plot remain deliberately unresolved, contributing to the idea that true knowledge is elusive, and actual events of the story are obscured in favour of the characters' perceptions.

The book ends with the theme of The Telephone, which appears in numerous books by Murakami, usually when telephoning from a far-away place, whose location is unclear.

== In popular culture ==
- The book is mentioned in the movie Paris, Je T'aime.
- A passage of the book was used in Channel 4's TV drama Nearly Famous in the UK.
- The bands Project Orange and Weatherday named songs after this novel.
- In episode nine of the anime, Mawaru Penguindrum, Himari Takakura returns a few books while at a library, including one called "Sputnik Weirdo," a parody of Murakami's title. Himari then proceeds to look around the library for Murakami's Super Frog Saves Tokyo

== See also ==
- List of spacecraft called Sputnik
- Jack Kerouac, an author from the Beat generation, derisively referred to as a "beatnik"; Miu confuses this with Sputnik, leading to the book's title.
