= Christina Reid =

Irish playwright (1942–2015)

- (fair use image)
- Born: March 12, 1942; Ardoyne, Northern Ireland
- Died: May 31, 2015 (aged 73); England
- Occupation: Playwright
- Spouse(s): 1. Michael Reid; 2. Richard Howard
- Children: Three

Christina Reid (12 March 1942 – 31 May 2015) was an Irish playwright whose early scripts focused on the working class people of Northern Ireland, and the Troubles. Her work has appeared in theatres in Belfast, London and New York.

== Life ==
Reid was born in Ardoyne, North Belfast to James and Christina Orchin, the oldest of three children. Despite living in a part of the city that was predominantly Catholic, the family was Protestant and her father was a Grand Master in the Orange Order. She attended Everton Primary School on the Crumlin Road, Belfast, before entering Model School for Girls in North Belfast. She left school in 1957 at age fifteen and spent the following years working at odd jobs.

In 1963 she married a civil engineer Michael Reid and the couple had three daughters: Heidi, Tara and Siubhan. In the late 1970s, Reid returned to school and completed her O- and A-level exams. In 1981, she enrolled in the English degree programme at Queen's University Belfast, but winning an Ulster Television drama award for her sixty-minute one-act play in 1981 and becoming a single parent following her divorce meant she was not able to complete the programme.

Reid was a writer-in-residence at the Lyric Theatre (1983–1984) in Belfast. Because she was a forty-year-old writer without any theatre experience, she used her time at the Lyric to intensively study the script development process. Reid then became a writer-in-residence at the Young Vic Theater. She was also a scriptwriter for BBC Radio 4's drama series Citizens.

In 1987, Reid married the English actor Richard Howard and moved with her daughters to Twickenham, England, where she lived out her life and died of pancreatic cancer in 2015. With the move she refocused her work and after 1989, she seemed to target English, not Irish, audiences.

Despite her new focus, she remained a Patron of Youth Action Northern Ireland, a charity working to inspire young people in the arts. One of its projects is the Rainbow Factory, which has over 450 young people participating a range of classes, workshops and performances.

The Christina Reid Archive can be found at the Performing Arts Archive at the Linen Hall Library, Belfast.

== Selected awards ==
- 1981 Ulster Television Drama Award, "Did You Hear the One About the Irishman?"
- 1983 Thames Television Playwriting Award for "Tea in a China Cup"
- 1986 George Devine Award for "The Belle of Belfast City"

== Selected works ==
=== Plays ===
- Tea In A China Cup, Lyric Theatre, Belfast, Northern Ireland, 1983
- Did You Hear The One About The Irishman . . .?, New York, 1985
- Joyriders, Tricycle Theatre, London, 1986
- The Belle Of Belfast City, Lyric Theatre, Belfast, Northern Ireland, 1989
- My Name, Shall I Tell You My Name? Andrews Lane Theatre, Dublin, 1989
- Les Misérables, Nottingham Playhouse, 1992
- The King of the Castle, Cottesloe Theatre, National Theatre, London, 1999
- Clowns, The Room, Orange Tree, Richmond, 1996
- A Year And A Day, National Theatre, London, 2007

=== Books ===
- Christina Reid, Plays I, Methuen, 1997. ISBN 978-0-413-71220-2
