= The Blunkett Tapes =

Diaries of UK politician David Blunkett

The Blunkett Tapes: My life in the bear pit is a book by British MP David Blunkett based on his own audio diaries detailing his time as a cabinet minister in the Labour government from 1997 to 2004.

The book was serialised in The Guardian from October 2006, and was published on 16 October 2006 by Bloomsbury. The diaries were also the subject of two episodes of the Channel 4 Dispatches documentary in October 2006, and were read on BBC Radio 4 as book of the week in October 2006.

Blunkett is reported to have received £1m from his book, despite various criticisms made of it. Private Eye in particular has repeatedly lampooned the book by suggesting humorous alternative uses for the mountains of unsold copies of the weighty tome and printing "extracts" mocking the book as self-pitying.

== Prison Riots ==
As Home Secretary during the Lincoln Prison riots in 2002, Blunkett accused in his diaries the then Head of Prison Service, Martin Narey "of dithering over the riots"

Narey has a different version of events. During a telephone conversation in October 2002 he told Blunkett he would not rush into ordering staff back into jail if it put lives at risk.

Narey is quoted in The Times: "Blunkett shrieked at me that he didn't care about lives, told me to call in the Army and 'machine-gun' the prisoners and - still shrieking - again ordered me to take the prison back immediately.

"I refused. David hung up."

Narey also says he wrote up the details of the telephone conversation he took in a restaurant on the Isle of Wight on the evening of the riot and then reported it to senior Civil Servants as he was "disturbed" by it.

Narey claims that the Blunkett's reaction compared unfavourably with his Conservative and Labour predecessors and his successor secretaries, having seen four very closely — Michael Howard, Jack Straw, Blunkett and Charles Clarke. "I felt David’s response to a crisis was the least competent of those that I saw,” he said.

Narey added: “It is important that officials feel confident in being able to speak the truth to power. Far too often in my experience, David terrified political advisers and those very close to him.”
