= Curved and Juneteenth =

Episodes of The Proud Family: Louder and Prouder

"Curved" and "Juneteenth" are the third and tenth episodes of the second season of the American animated sitcom The Proud Family: Louder and Prouder which were released to Disney+ alongside the rest of the second season on February 1, 2023. The episodes also premiered on Disney Channel on March 11 and April 1, respectively.

In "Curved", Penny grows jealous when Dijonay starts dating for the first time. In "Juneteenth", Maya discovers that Smithville's founder was a slave owner and sparks protesting against his legacy.

These episodes sparked controversy for their handling of their central topics.

== Plot ==
=== "Curved" ===
"Curved"
- The Proud Family: Louder and Prouder episode
- From left: Dijonay Jones, Maya Lebowitz-Jenkins, Myron Lewinski, Penny Proud, and Zoey Howzer performing in the controversial "slaves built this country" scene from "Curved"
- Episode no.: Season 2 Episode 3
- Directed by: Latoya Raveneau
- Written by: Ashley Soto Paniagua
- Production code: 203
- Original release date: February 1, 2023
- Running time: 22 minutes

Episode chronology
← Previous "Grandma's Hands"	Next → "A Perfect 10"

Penny is preparing for her and Dijonay's friend-iversary. At the same time, she is also on the debate team with Maya, Myron, and Zoey. However, Zoey has lost her voice, and a new debate team member is randomly chosen by their teacher Brother Kwame, who turns out to be Dijonay. No one thinks she is up to the task, but to their astonishment, Dijonay is revealed to have an eidetic memory and is able to help the team win the debate. She soon meets Darrius St. Vil, another debate member, and begins to spend more time with him. Penny becomes angered, especially when they both begin to openly mock her in front of them. While at the zoo, Penny voices her frustrations to Shuggie the Panda before discovering that Darrius has been lifting notes from Dijonay. She reveals this to the team and Dijonay is angered and quits. On the day of the debate, Dijonay returns and helps her team win. While angry at Darrius, she forgives him and opts to celebrate her win and friend-iversary with Penny.

=== "Juneteenth" ===
"Juneteenth"
- The Proud Family: Louder and Prouder episode
- Episode no.: Season 2 Episode 10
- Directed by: Tara N. Whitaker
- Written by: Samira Fuller
- Production code: 210
- Original release date: February 1, 2023
- Running time: 22 minutes

Episode chronology
← Previous "BeBe"	Next → "Proud Family-Verse, Part I"

As Barry reveals that he is descended from Smithville's founder Christian A. Smith, Maya goes to school and meets Emily, a girl who beckons her to inquire about Smith's history, learning that there is virtually no information about him prior to 1900. No one else seems to notice Emily, but Maya, who finds a journal from her buried in the dirt near the statue of Smith, whom the town plans on honoring later. Maya, Penny, and their friends take the journal to Brother Kwame and discover that it contains information revealing that Smith was a slave owner and that Emily is a ghost and may have been killed for trying to celebrate the first Juneteenth. Wizard Kelly refuses to end the celebration and Barry refuses to believe his family history. Upset, the kids go to the celebration and march, resulting in them and their parents getting arrested for standing up. Barry admits that he was ashamed and apologizes. After a month of negotiations, Smithville is renamed Emilyville and a statue of Emily is erected instead of Smith. Maya then sees Emily appear as an old woman before her spirit disappears, implying she was not killed and lived to know freedom.

== Production ==
The second season of The Proud Family: Louder and Prouder went into production in April 2022.

"Curved" was written by Ashley Soto Paniagua and directed by Latoya Raveneau, and "Juneteenth" was written by Tara N. Whitaker and directed by Samira Fuller. "Curved" and "Juneteenth" are the third and tenth-produced episodes of the second season of The Proud Family: Louder and Prouder.

== Reception ==
"Curved" and "Juneteenth" were both negatively received by right-wing pundits for their poor execution of their topics and perceived use of propaganda; notably, the "slaves built this country" scene in "Curved" and the protesting scene in "Juneteenth". These episodes were often seen as "woke" or "anti-white". On the other hand, Anaiah Davis of The Bradley Scout speaks against the criticisms. The controversy also sparked some confusion, as some believed the episodes were merely retelling history.
