= List of The Proud Family episodes =

The Proud Family is an American animated television series that aired on Disney Channel from September 15, 2001 to August 19, 2005. Originally pitched to Nickelodeon, it was eventually picked up by Disney Channel in 2001. The show was created by Walt Disney Animation Studios animator Bruce W. Smith, and produced by his studio, Jambalaya Studios.

The Proud Family is about an African-American family and presents young audiences with different daily situations that many teenagers might have to face during their teenage and adult years. A television film, The Proud Family Movie, was released on August 19, 2005, ended the series, which ran for two seasons.

== Series overview ==
Season	Episodes	Originally released	
Season	Episodes	First released	Last released
1	21	September 15, 2001	May 24, 2002
2	31	September 27, 2002	August 19, 2005
TV movie		August 19, 2005	

== Episodes ==
=== Season 1 (2001–02) ===
No. overall	No. in season	Title	Directed by	Written by	Original release date	Prod. code
1	1	"Bring It On"	Mucci Fassett	Doreen Spicer	September 15, 2001	105
Penny tries out for cheerleading under the hope that her friend Dijonay will shoe her in, however LaCienega, Dijonay's old friend arrives and tries out; showing that she is just as equally talented, but also cruel to Penny. Dijonay holds a cheerleading contest to determine who will get the spot. Penny discovers that LaCienega's family has moved across the street and her family invites them over. LaCienega is polite and kind and Trudy insists that Penny be nice to her. However, LaCienega still insults her at school, causing a frustrated Penny to sit with the Gross Sisters who believe that Penny is asking them to put a hit on her. After getting warned by Sticky about it, Penny saves LaCienega, but gets injured in the process. Dijonay apologizes for not seeing LaCienega's cruelty and Penny forgives her. Meanwhile, Oscar quickly befriends Felix and they decide to sneak into the latter's soundproof theater to get away from their "nagging wives". Their wives, Trudy and Sunset discover this and presumably destroy the TV.
2	2	"Strike"	Douglas McCarthy	Michelle Listenbee Brown	September 21, 2001	106
After Penny outs Oscar for making her do all the chores around the house, he and Trudy let her go to the movies with her friends. Unfortunately, her allowance is a measly five dollars and tickets are ten dollars, which her friends also lack. They try to get Wizard Kelly to lower the price, but it still is not enough for them. They go to the dollar theater, but quit and try to do other things, only to find that they are all expensive. Finally fed up, Penny calls for all the kids in the neighborhood to go on strike to ask for a bigger allowance. The kids find themselves living on the street and despite Penny's best efforts, everyone is ready to call it quits. When the parents start hiring other kids to do chores for money, everyone returns home, except for Penny. Oscar finally comes out and talks sense into her so that she can "negotiate" her allowance over food. Oscar finally becomes more liberal about how much Penny gets with her allowance, thanks to Trudy.
3	3	"Rumors"	Bruce W. Smith	Silvia Cardenas	September 21, 2001	101
Penny asks her parents if she can have a sleepover. They agree under the condition that she only invite her friends and that Suga Mama watch over them while they go to an awards dinner. Suga Mama falls asleep watching TV and Puff "watches" Bebe and Cece, who torment the poor pooch. Dijonay, Zoey and an uninvited LaCienega arrive with the former inviting more guests to Penny's house. While playing spin-the-bottle, Penny lands on the school nerd, Myron and play seven minutes in heaven. Oscar and Trudy return just as Penny exits the closet with a hyperventilating Myron and is punished for a month. At school, Dijonay reports a rumor that Penny and Myron are a couple. Despite Penny's efforts, the rumor gets worse. LaCienega reveals that she spread the rumor for not getting invited and she and Penny get into a fight, only for people to think that they are both fighting over Myron. Penny makes a speech, and song, about rumors, though it only gets a minor reaction. Penny apologizes to her parents about the party afterwards.: Guest star: Marcus T. Paulk as Myron Lewinski
4	4	"Tiger Whisperer"	Douglas McCarthy	Alison Taylor	September 28, 2001	104
It is Take Your Daughter to Work Day and Penny was planning to go with Dijonay and her mother to record company to see a rapper. Nevertheless, she is reluctantly dragged off by Trudy to her job at the Vet Clinic while Zoey and LaCienega go with their moms and then Dijonay's as well. A magician named Tristan brings in his tiger, who Penny is able to "hear" him and discover he is a boy named Ajay. They are soon invited to the circus where Ajay breaks free from his humiliating routine and keeps Penny to himself so that he can speak with her. She resolves to return him to India. Meanwhile, Bobby invites Oscar to the Wizard Kelly basketball game after getting "floor seats" and invites Felix. It turns out that they are selling frozen pops, but Oscar gets attention from the cheerleaders. They ultimately help, Penny and Trudy get Ajay onto a plane with Wizard Kelly to send him back home to India. Penny's friends are revealed to have had a terrible time while Penny mentally communicates with Ajay.: Guest star: Bruce Vilanch as Tristan the Magician.
5	5	"EZ Jackster"	Mucci Fassett	David Wyatt	October 5, 2001	103
Penny is working at Mr. Min's record store, only for her first paycheck to be $0.05, having used her 10% discount to buy CDs. She meets a bootlegger whom she has a crush on named Mega who introduces her to a website he created called EZ Jackster which allows people to download songs for free and brings her in (à la The Matrix). Obsessed with the site's services, Penny tells Dijonay who tells everyone else about it. Soon, the whole world begins to use EZ Jackster; resulting in the biggest rapper, Sir Paid-A-Lot, to complain to Wizard Kelly about the measly sum he received. He calls the authorities who trace the site back to Penny. Trudy is upset with her over the matter, but Penny insists that she is not hurting anyone. Mr. Min is forced to close his store and fire Penny and Dijonay because the site ruined his business. Penny returns home and tells Trudy that she learned her lesson. Mega calls her again to ask if she is still using the site, but Penny finally turns him away and takes control of her life.: Guest stars: Ray J as Mega and Gedde Watanabe as Mr. Min; Note: A reference to Napster.
6	6	"Spelling Bee"	Bruce W. Smith	Jayne Hamil	October 12, 2001	111
When Wizard Kelly launches a spelling bee competition, Oscar forces Penny to train and makes her enter the competition so that he can re-live his glory days all over again, but the son of a contestant who lost to Oscar in a spelling bee years ago made other ways to win the competition.: Guest stars: James Avery as Crandall Smythe, Ken Lawson as Timothy Smythe, and Ron Glass as the Talking Baby.
7	7	"She's Got Game"	Douglas McCarthy	Doreen Spicer	October 19, 2001	109
When Penny tries to impress a boy she likes at school, she ends up on the football team, but Coach Collins refuses to let her play since she is a girl. Penny is finally given her chance when Michael, the coach's son, refuses to play out of fear. Penny then proves herself a capable football player, earning the respect of her teammates. Meanwhile, Oscar develops a new food for the Proud Snax brand called jelly poppers, which pop in more ways than one.: Guest star: Attorney Gloria Allred as Gloria Cochran, Mablean Ephriam as the Judge
8	8	"Forbidden Date"	Douglas McCarthy	Dana Hali	November 2, 2001	108
Breaking her father's strict "no-dating rule", Penny goes with her friends to the amusement park. Thanks to LaCienega, she ends up with an un-popular, overweight boy named Carlos. Penny thought that Carlos would be a nerd, but ended up being a very caring person and saves Bebe and Cece's lives when they sneak on a roller coaster after they escape from the baby care center at the park.: Guest star: Kel Mitchell as Carlos
9	9	"Teacher's Pet"	Mucci Fassett	Calvin Brown, Jr.	November 9, 2001	107
Penny's grades fall victim to a longtime grudge held between her teacher Ms. Dinkins and Suga Mama. It is revealed that the grudge between them began 50 years ago when they fought for the affections of Percy Proud, Suga Mama's late husband. Oscar and Trudy decide to enroll the twins in a private pre-school, but the man in charge turns out to be a classmate from Oscar's junior high years, who hasn't forgotten about Oscar picking on him. Thanks to Penny in the end, Suga Mama and Ms. Dinkins became friends again and Ms. Dinkins does the right thing and changes the grade on Penny's paper from a "D" to the one she deserves: an "A".: Guest stars: Dorien Wilson as Dave Daniels and Hattie Winston as Gertie Dinkins.
10	10	"Don't Leave Home Without It"	Mucci Fassett	Michael Carrington & James E. West II	November 16, 2001	112
Penny is given a credit card, leaving her to spend massively without her parents knowledge. She then learns the value of a dollar and how credit cards really work. Meanwhile, Oscar tries to get rid of a mouse in the Proud's home.: Guest star: Steve Harvey as the Credit Card.; Note(s): The episode was withheld from syndication due to complications with several references to product placements until this issue was resolved in March 2022 only on iTunes and the complete series DVD. On August 3, 2022, the episode was later added to Disney+.
11	11	"Seven Days of Kwanzaa"	Bruce W. Smith	Wayne Stamps	December 7, 2001	119
The Proud Family is taught an important lesson about the true meaning of Christmas and Kwanzaa by a homeless family.: Guest stars: Vivica A. Fox as Margaret, Samuel L. Jackson as Joseph, Raven-Symoné as Stephanie, and Pat Crawford Brown as Agnus.
12	12	"Makeover"	Douglas McCarthy	Jeny Quine	December 14, 2001	113
Penny, Dijonay and LaCienega turn Zoey into the perfect date, but then Nubia Gross wants them to do the same with her sister Olay. When they succeed, Olay attracts the attention of many boys and begins hanging out with Penny and her friends, making Nubia jealous. Olay eventually reverts to her old ways after her date refuses to pay for their food. After Nubia takes Penny and her friends' money, she tells Olay to take care of them, making Penny and her friends fear for the worst. Instead of beating them up, Olay reveals she kept a friendship bracelet Penny gave her earlier in the episode, and waves goodbye. Meanwhile, BeBe and CeCe get their pictures taken, but end up in a baby diaper commercial thanks to Oscar.
13	13	"The Party"	Douglas McCarthy	Mark Swinton	January 4, 2002	114
Penny convinces her parents to let her have a party at their house, but LaCienega is also having a party on the same night. Penny is disappointed when her friends go to LaCienega's party instead. Myron and the Gross Sisters attend Penny's party, along with singer Lou Rawls, who is a friend of Suga Mama. Penny is depressed about her party and the absence of her friends, and is hesitant to partake in the party activities. Eventually, Lou Rawls cheers Penny up by singing his song, "You'll Never Find Another Love Like Mine". Later, Penny's friends ask her if they can join her party instead, saying that LaCienega's party was a disappointment. Although Penny is upset at her friends, she forgives them and agrees to let them come inside.: Guest star: Lou Rawls as himself
14	14	"Love Thy Neighbor"	Mucci Fassett	Michelle Listenbee Brown	January 18, 2002	115
During a barbecue at the Boulevardez house, Oscar accidentally causes a fire. Although Oscar and Felix put out the fire, the fire department arrives and one of the firemen insists that they hose down the house, which causes an interior flood. While their house is being repaired, the Boulevardez family stays with the Proud family. Oscar becomes upset when BeBe and CeCe start calling Felix their father. Meanwhile, Penny is upset that she has to share her room with LaCienega, as the two do not get along. During a school swim team practice, Penny and her friends discover that LaCienega has large feet, which she has tried to hide as she is embarrassed by them. After the children laugh at her feet, LaCienega becomes depressed and spends much of her time crying in Penny's room. Oscar cheers up LaCienega after talking to her about how everyone is different in some way. LaCienega goes on to win the Wizard Kelly Teen Pageant after demonstrating her quick swimming speed.
15	15	"I Had a Dream"	Mucci Fassett	James E. West II & T. Smith III	February 1, 2002	116
For Black History Month, Penny and her friends are given school assignments by their teacher Mr. Webb to dress up as prominent black people and give a presentation on how each person contributed to black history. At school, Penny slips on a wet floor that was just mopped by the angry janitor, Mr. Andrews. Later, at her house, Penny is tasked with dropping Puff off at a groomer on her way to school, where she will give her presentation on Angela Davis. Penny and Puff get caught in a wind storm on the way to school. Afterwards, Penny is confused when she learns that her friends no longer spend time with Zoey because she is white and that Mr. Webb is now the janitor while Mr. Andrews is the teacher. When Penny returns home, she learns that the year is 1955. Despite their differences in skin color, Penny becomes friends with Zoey, going against what is considered normal. Penny and Zoey convince their class to unite against segregation, and Penny eventually convinces an outraged mob of the same concept after reciting Martin Luther King Jr.'s "I Have A Dream" speech. Penny wakes up and learns that she was only dreaming, having gone unconscious after falling on the wet floor at school.: Guest stars: Thomas Mikal Ford as Mr. Webb and Stephen Root as Mr. Andrews
16	16	"I Love You Penny Proud"	Douglas McCarthy	Doreen Spicer	February 8, 2002	117
On Valentine's Day, someone mysteriously begins tagging graffiti with Penny's name everywhere, professing their love for her. Penny and her friends eventually catch the tagger, Johnny McBride, a classmate who is handicapped. Penny starts dating him, but while on a ski trip with her family (which was meant to be a private getaway for Oscar and Trudy), Johnny turns out to be obnoxious and rude, prompting Penny to break up with him.: Guest star: Shia LaBeouf as Johnny McBride
17	17	"Puff's Magic Adventure"	Douglas McCarthy	T. Smith III	March 1, 2002	110
Oscar is trying to enjoy "Oscar Day", but Suga Mama shows up to drop off Puff while she goes to her Tae Bo class. Trudy then drags Oscar out to shop for new furniture, leaving Penny to watch the twins and Puff. When Penny gets roped into a game with her friends outside, Bebe and CeCe antagonize Puff, causing them to run away. Penny manages to rescue the twins, but Puff ends up falling into the river. Suga Mama is depressed without her beloved poodle, and while the family and friends try to find him, Puff has a series of adventures including nearly being sacrificed into a volcano and appearing on magazine covers in Paris.
18	18	"Enter the Bullies"	Mucci Fassett	James E. West II	March 15, 2002	102
The Gross Sisters target Penny after she clues the school principal in on their bullying ways. Meanwhile, BeBe and CeCe are due for their shots, and are scared (thanks to Oscar). Dr. Payne, however, surprises the twins with vaccine-laced lollipops, which they love.
19	19	"The Altos"	Douglas McCarthy	Ron Neal	April 12, 2002	120
Wizard Kelly holds a scavenger hunt (which was actually Oscar's idea) for the kids to participate in, with the prize being to "live like the Wizard" for a day. While this is happening, Sticky's parents get divorced, prompting him to act out by hanging with a group of bullies called The Altos, robbing his friends daily. Worried about Sticky, Penny and Trudy convince Oscar to step up and be a positive role model for the boy. However, Sticky winds up stealing the clues to the scavenger hunt so the Altos are guaranteed a win. He then regrets his actions when he learns the Altos are plotting to rob Wizard Kelly after winning the scavenger hunt.: Guest star: Jacob Vargas as Big Alto
20	20	"Hip-Hop Helicopter"	Mucci Fassett	Calvin Brown, Jr.	April 26, 2002	118
Penny and her friends form a dance group known as "LPDZ", and dance on "Hip-Hop Helicopter", a famous dance show. Oscar gets furious due to their skimpy outfits. A conversation with Trudy convinces Penny to not wear the outfit anymore, but when Dijoany's cousin invites them to a high school party, Penny and her friends deal with the peer pressure of "acting cool" while lying about their ages. Elsewhere, the Proud and Boulevardez families compete against each other in bowling, and Oscar is obsessed with beating Suga Mama at the game.: Notes: Hip-Hop Helicopter is a parody of Soul Train. In this episode, we learn that Dijonay's cousin Bethany works for Hip-Hop Helicopter.; Guest stars: Big Boy as himself, Shaun Robinson as herself, Shar Jackson as Bethany, and Lamont Bentley as Gary.
21	21	"Romeo Must Wed"	Mucci Fassett	Calvin Brown, Jr.	May 24, 2002	121
Penny has a crush on Kwok, who is arranged to be married to another girl because of the traditions of where his parents are from in China. This irritates Penny, who is opposite Kwok playing the title roles in the school production of Romeo and Juliet. Meanwhile, Trudy's big sister Diana, a famous actress, is visiting from New York City, much to Oscar's chagrin. When Diana begins taking charge in prepping for the play, Trudy becomes annoyed.: Guest stars: Sheryl Lee Ralph as Aunt Diana, Amy Hill as Mrs. Wong, Jeffrey Tambor as Randolph Verascola, Benjamin Lum as Mr. Wong and Dante Basco as Kwok.

=== Season 2 (2002–05) ===
No. overall	No. in season	Title	Directed by	Written by	Original release date	Prod. code
22	1	"A Star Is Scorned"	Mucci Fassett	T. Smith III	September 27, 2002	204
LaCienega, Penny, Dijonay and Zoey reform LPDZ. They perform a new song that attracts the attention of Wizard Kelly, who signs them to a record deal with Uncle Bobby (Oscar's brother) acting as their manager. Everything turns out well for them until Penny decides to sing solo. She isolates her friends for fame but begins to miss the life (and the friends) she used to have. Elsewhere, Oscar is annoyed by Penny's success and begins to go insane because of it.
23	2	"A Hero for Halloween"	Bruce W. Smith	Calvin Brown, Jr.	October 18, 2002	201
Its Halloween and Wizard Kelly is hosting the "Fright-tacular, Y'all!" Penny's friends are excited, as Lil Romeo is scheduled to perform, but she does not want to go because she thinks Halloween is for kids. The Prouds have a party at their house, but Oscar receives an unexpected visit from the realtor who sold him the house 10 years ago, warning him that the ghost of the previous homeowner, Garrett Krebs, will visit the house that night. A mysterious man arrives at the house later on, but the Prouds believe him to be the magician they hired for the party. Trudy then sends Penny to go to the Wizard's party, but the party is sold out. Upset, Penny eats Oscar's new snacks, which gives her superpowers. After saving the city from a meteor and preventing the Gross Sisters from stealing all the goodie bags, the Wizard allows Penny to enjoy the party. Meanwhile, the "magician" makes a great impression on the Prouds and their guests, but they are thrown a curve when the real magician arrives. Krebs then reveals himself, scaring everyone out of the house, but bars the door to prevent the Prouds from leaving. Krebs declares he is there to take his house back, vowing to bring the Prouds into the afterlife with him. Penny, still a hero, arrives and duels the ghost, defeating him to save the family and the house.: Guest stars: Lil Romeo as himself, Tim Conway as Alvin Peterson, and Ving Rhames as Garrett Krebs
24	3	"Ain't Nothing Like the Real Thingy, Baby"	T.J. House	James E. West II	October 25, 2002	202
Trudy asks Oscar to try to get a popular cartoon character called Thingy to come to BeBe and CeCe's birthday party, but Penny suspects the woman who plays the character is having an affair with her father. Penny then tells her not to come to the party and the babies attack Oscar. In the end, it is revealed the woman who plays Thingy is Debra Williams, Trudy's old roommate from college, and she was the one who introduced Oscar to Trudy several years ago. Penny is then grounded for several weeks due to her actions.: Guest star: Vanessa Williams as Debra
25	4	"Poetic Justice"	Mucci Fassett	Nguyen Orange	November 8, 2002	205
Penny teaches Dijonay how to spit poetry, who does poorly at first but does phenomenally on stage, leaving a jealous Penny in her wake. When they enter a spoken word competition, Penny makes it personal by reciting a spiteful poem of Dijonay "betraying" her, but Dijonay counters with a poem about how much Penny's friendship means to her, winning the competition. Meanwhile, the Prouds' 9-year-old neighbor, Peabo annoys Oscar by getting him electrocuted, caught by Trudy when he was being seduced by two beautiful lifeguards, and attacked by a giant bird.: Guest star: Mos Def as himself
26	5	"Behind Family Lines"	Bruce W. Smith	Wayne Stamps	December 13, 2002	207
BeBe and CeCe are getting baptized, and Penny invites Trudy's family to the ceremony, much to Oscar's annoyance. He then retaliates by sending his brother, Bobby, to invite his country cousin Ray Ray, his wife Boonnetta, and their children to the baptism. The families wind up clashing after a series of failed dinners. When they both threaten to leave due to the fighting, Penny takes it upon herself to make sure everyone is there, even if it means lying to them that the other family is gone. On the day of the baptism, they start a big fight again, leading Penny to call them all out for their behavior, along with her cousin Chanel from Trudy's side and her cousin Ray Ray, Jr. from Oscar's side. When the three of them show how well they get along, the grownups are finally inspired to put their differences aside and come together as a family.: Guest stars: Mo'Nique as Boonnetta, Solange Knowles as Chanel, David Alan Grier as Reuben, Wendy Raquel Robinson as Leslie, Sheryl Lee Ralph as Diana, Jamal Mixon as Ray Ray Junior, Cicely Tyson as Mrs. Maureen Parker, Robert Guillaume as Dr. Parker, and Anthony Anderson as Ray Ray
27	6	"Hooray for Iesha"	T.J. House	John Marsh	January 3, 2003	206
Penny's favorite TV show Iesha gets canceled, leaving the girls to go to Hollywood to convince the writers to put it back. Once it does, Penny learns Iesha is not who she thought she was.: Guest stars: Gabrielle Union as Sunny Stevens/Iesha, Shaun Robinson as herself, Kym Whitley as Mamma, and Wendy Raquel Robinson as Katanga; Note: Iesha is a parody of the UPN series, Moesha, and My Momma and Me is a parody of the UPN series, The Parkers.
28	7	"Camping Trip"	T.J. House	Mark Swinton	February 17, 2003	209
Oscar and Felix get a camper with the intention to take their families camping. Ultimately, they get lost and wind up in a riverbed, which floods after a storm. Oscar and Felix try to find help, while their families and friends learn how to survive the wilderness.
29	8	"Crouching Trudy, Hidden Penny"	Douglas McCarthy	James E. West II	March 7, 2003	215
Penny and her friends are inspired to pick up karate after seeing a movie and wind up in the same dojo as the Chang triplets. When the star of the movie they saw opens a new dojo in town, her friends abandon her at the dojo they started at. Penny wants to follow her friends to the new dojo, but Trudy forbids it, wanting her to stick with her dojo. Penny is not thrilled when all of her friends are across the street breaking boards, while she is helping the Changs clean the dojo. However, as time goes on, she comes to appreciate her time there, especially after she and the Changs manage to easily defeat her friends in a karate tournament. Penny realizes the reason they won was that their dojo offered discipline, something the other dojo did not have.: Note: The episode title is a reference to Crouching Tiger, Hidden Dragon.
30	9	"Pulp Boot Camp"	T.J. House	Doreen Spicer	March 28, 2003	214
Penny tries to be a journalist on the school's paper, but she is turned down because her submissions were too good and innocent. She turns to the Gross Sisters to do a school exposé on bullies so she can get a spot on the school newspaper staff. However, she winds up becoming just like them and starts bullying all her friends. When her bad behavior begins to affect her home life, her parents send her to boot camp to straighten her up. Penny is the narrator for this episode.
31	10	"Tween Town"	T.J. House	Calvin Brown, Jr.	April 11, 2003	219
When Penny lies to her parents and sneaks to a teen nightclub, she gets in trouble and is grounded. However, Al Roker overhears her wish that all the parents on earth would disappear and grants her wish. At first, Penny and her friends love having the parents gone, but then begin to miss them. Penny tries to bargain with Roker to reverse the wish, which will be easier said than done.: Guest star: Al Roker as himself
32	11	"One in a Million"	Mucci Fassett	T Smith III	April 18, 2003	213
When Penny gets a chance to win $1,000,000 by shooting a half-court shot at the All-Star basketball game, Oscar convinces her to let him take the shot instead in order to fulfill a lifelong dream.: Guest star: Kobe Bryant as himself
33	12	"Hmm, Tastes Like..." "Hmmm... Tastes Like"	Douglas McCarthy	Calvin Brown, Jr.	May 9, 2003	212
When Oscar's latest snacks for the PSA Snack-Off proceed to make Penny and her friends sick, Suga Mama comes to the rescue with new "Get Up N Go" Bars, which prove to be very tasty. After Suga Mama enters the Snack-Off and wins, Oscar is stunned. Initially plotting revenge, he decides to cash in on Suga Mama's snacks, making a profit. Wizard Kelly turns up, wanting to buy the snacks. Oscar and the family want to take the money, but Suga Mama inspires Oscar through song to believe in himself and the potential for success, resulting in Oscar dismissing the Wizard. Suga Mama then makes an appearance on The Oprah Winfrey Show, to talk about the snacks. When she goes to demonstrate, she shows that part of the process includes putting her foot into the ingredients, making everyone sick. Oscar loses all his money, and the Wizard, as always, has the last laugh.: Guest star: Debra Wilson as Oprah Winfrey; Note: The song Suga Mama performs is from The Wiz.
34	13	"There's Something About Rene"	Douglas McCarthy	Michael Carrington	May 23, 2003	211
The Proud Family home is in a state of disarray, just as Trudy is preparing to go to a convention for work. Stressed out, Trudy seeks to hire a nanny to keep the house (and the family) in order while she is away. After a series of disappointing interviews, a gorgeous young woman named Rene shows up. Oscar and the family are instantly won over, but Trudy is skeptical. Nevertheless, she hires Rene and leaves for her trip. While there, she has a nightmare of Rene stealing her family and ruining her home. She returns to find everything is fine, but matters are made worse when her family and friends barely recognize her. Trudy then tries to get rid of Rene, which is easier said than done.: Guest star: Tisha Campbell-Martin as Rene; Note: The episode's title is a reference to the movie, There's Something About Mary.
35	14	"Adventures in Bebe-Sitting"	Mucci Fassett	Dana Hali	June 20, 2003	210
Penny and her friends get tickets to go to a concert, but she and Dijonay have to stay home and babysit since both their parents go on a couples' retreat, which the husbands frequently try to get out of. Dijonay decides to ditch Penny to go to the concert with Zoey and LaCienega, leaving Penny with Dijonay's wild and troublesome brothers and sisters. Penny and Dijonay's siblings have a run-in with 3rd Storee and are given a free ride to the concert. In the end, the tickets that Penny and her friends bought (from the Gross Sisters) are revealed to be fakes, but Penny and the kids (excluding Dijonay, as payback for her betrayal) get to see the concert for free thanks to 3rd Storee. Dijonay apologizes to Penny for her decision, and while Penny says she cannot trust Dijonay anymore, she does remain friends with her.: Guest stars: Kym Whitley as Caramel Jones, John Witherspoon as Oran Jones, 3rd Storee as Themselves, and Debra Wilson as Tabasco/Basil; Note: The episode’s title is a reference to the movie, Adventures in Babysitting.
36	15	"Surf and Turf"	Mucci Fassett	Lydia Look	June 27, 2003	208
Dijonay attempts to kiss Sticky, by entering a contest where she chooses a boy to kiss her or diss her with a huge prize if she is kissed, but regardless, Sticky rejects her. This leaves Dijonay heartbroken, so she attempts to make him jealous by asking the new kid, Duke to the Beach Blanket Bananza. Her plan works leaving Sticky jealous, which prompts him to ask Penny to enter the contest with him. Meanwhile, Suga Mama and Papi enter as well and are used as side-comedy. The three teams make it to the final round, a surf contest. During the contest, Djonay and Sticky are more focused on showing off to one another. Finally, Sticky, Penny, Duke, and Djonay lost to Suga Mama and Papi, leaving Djonay back where she was with Sticky. Elsewhere, Oscar decides to enter Bebe and Cece into Wizard Kelly's annual baby derby against the Red-Nosed baby, a baby who can talk. They make a wager, but Oscar, desperate to win, uses Felix's nephew Javier instead of his own babies. *Notes*: When Sticky asks Zoey to pretend to date him to make Dijonay jealous she says, "I don't want no scrub.". This is a reference to TLC's 1999 song "No Scrubs". When Sticky asks Penny to help him win Dijonay back he tells her, "I ain't too proud to beg now.".: Guest star: Big Boy as himself
37	16	"The Legend of Johnny Lovely"	T.J. House & Douglas McCarthy	Ray "Cory" Daniels	July 25, 2003	217
In an unusual episode, a boy named Johnny Lovely arrives in Wizville and charms all the girls in school except Penny, who is convinced that it's nothing but a facade. Papi sings about Johnny Lovely's escapades throughout the episode.: Note: Bloopers are shown at the end of this episode.
38	17	"The Camp...the Counselor...the Mole...and the Rock"	Mucci Fassett & Lenord Robinson	T. Smith III	August 1, 2003	218
Penny and her friends go to work as counselors for a summer camp, where Penny intends to meet her crush, an older boy named Tory. Wary, Oscar sends neighbor Peabo (who was going to the camp anyway) to spy on Penny, but Peabo is distracted by his own attempts to win over his new crush, Zoey.: Guest star: Kirk Franklin as Reverend Haygood
39	18	"It Takes a Thief"	Mucci Fassett	James E. West II	September 12, 2003	221
Penny, Dijonay, and Zoey get jobs at Wizard Kelly's new jewelry store, largely in part to LaCienega's relationship with the Wizard's son, Wizard Kelly, Jr. One day, the store manager, Randi, accuses them of stealing a watch that goes missing, resulting in all three of them getting fired. While attempting to clear their names, they later discover it was Bebe and Cece who took the watch, courtesy of a video Oscar was filming of an attractive woman in the store. Despite their innocence, the effort to get their jobs back is in vain, as Wizard Jr. has a new girlfriend at the end of the episode, who turns out to be Nubia Gross.: Guest star: Ashanti as Randi
40	19	"Wedding Bell Blues"	T.J. House	Calvin Brown, Jr.	September 19, 2003	222
Suga Mama has a new boyfriend in Clarence St. John, but Oscar is convinced that Clarence is only dating Suga Mama for her money. He hires his detective friend, Igloo, to spy on Clarence and Suga Mama. When Igloo reports that Suga Mama paid for all their activities, as well as mentions women he talked to who had been with Clarence and lost their money, the evidence lines up that Clarence is bad news. All talk of interfering is put on hold when Suga Mama announces she and Clarence will marry in one week. On the day of the wedding, Clarence's son turns up at the ceremony, revealing that his father is actually multibillionaire restaurateur Roscoe Carrington III and that he is a widower suffering from dementia. While Suga Mama is reimbursed for the money she spent on Clarence, she still bears the pain of watching him go.: Guest stars: Roscoe Lee Browne as Clarence and Smokey Robinson as himself; Note(s): This episode was scheduled to air after "Penny Potter" on September 26, 2003, which was preempted until the next week. Disney Channel stopped airing the episode from reruns in 2004 due to the result that Oscar accused Clarence of being a gigolo. The episode was later reinstated when the show was released on Disney+ in 2020.
41	20	"Penny Potter"	Douglas McCarthy & Lenord Robinson	Doreen Spicer	September 26, 2003	220
Oscar wakes the family up in the middle of the night to watch his latest Proud Snax commercial, but immediately afterward, a commercial airs promoting Sista Spice, Suga Mama's sister, and Oscar's aunt. Sista Spice possesses telekinesis, having the ability to move things around with her mind. Suga Mama is less than thrilled about her sister, and it is shown that they despise each other. Oscar uses this to his advantage, asking Spice to use her powers to get Suga Mama out of the house. Trudy then forces Oscar to apologize to Suga Mama, who responds with a hard right hook to his face, knocking him out. When Sista Spice, who was scheduled to perform at the WizArena, gets bumped in favor of Sir-Paid-A-Lot, Oscar offers her the Proud Snax parking lot for a show. When nobody shows up to the Sir-Paid-A-Lot concert, Wizard Kelly becomes suspicious. He then realizes all his stores are empty as well, and only finds Suga Mama and Bobby hanging out at his movie theater. Suga Mama then tells the Wizard about Spice's show and figuring out it's a scam by Spice, all three rush to put a stop to it. Spice tries to flee, but Suga Mama stops her and clues Oscar in on her scheming ways. The attendees get their money back, and Oscar and Suga Mama make up.: Guest Star: Jenifer Lewis as Aunt Spice; Note(s): The episode's title is a reference to Harry Potter. This was originally scheduled to air before "Wedding Bell Blues" on September 19, 2003, but was preempted until the following week.
42	21	"The Monkey Bidness" "Monkey Business"	Bruce W. Smith	Frederick N. Johnson	October 10, 2003	231
Mariah Carey's pet monkey, François, gets taken to Trudy's veterinary office after he passes out from eating a Proud Snack. Oscar takes Mr. Chips to Trudy but forgets about him when he starts trying to flirt with Mariah, and François and Mr. Chips get switched. Oscar tries to make money off of François (thinking he's Mr. Chips) because he can play the piano, while Mr. Chips is living a luxurious life with Mariah.: Guest star: Mariah Carey as herself; Note: The episode title is a play on Monkey Business.
43	22	"Thelma and Luis"	T.J. House & Lenord Robinson	Wayne Stamps	October 10, 2003	223
After accidentally flooding Felix's house, Papi is sent to a retirement home called Happy Endings. However, it is secretly an okra farm, where the residents are forced to work on the fields all day. When Penny and friends discover this, having come in before visiting hours, they attempt to reveal this to their parents, only for the farm to adequately camouflage itself during visiting hours. Only Suga Mama believes them, noticing the difference in feet size between Papi and his impostor. The next night, Sticky, Zoey, Lacienega, Penny, Dijonay, and Suga Mama go and rescue Papi. But while the two are taking a trip to Las Vegas, the farm's manager, Helga, is intent on retrieving Papi.: Guest stars: Estelle Harris as Helga and Brian Hooks as Igloo; Note: The episode's title is a reference to the movie Thelma & Louise.
44	23	"Culture Shock"	T.J. House	Doreen Spicer	October 24, 2003	229
Each of the students at school have to go to another family and write an essay on their experiences. Penny goes to the Zamin family (a Muslim family) finding out there is more to them than meets the eye.: Note: In the original version of the episode, the graffiti on the Zamins' house said, "Go away, towelheads!" This was later replaced by "Go back to your country!"
45	24	"Election"	T.J. House & Lenord Robinson	Tamiko K. Brooks	November 7, 2003	225
Penny runs for student body president but faces some stiff competition from Wizard Kelly, Jr., who is a shoo-in to win based on his popularity and status as Wizard Kelly's son. The competition gets fierce, but in the end, Myron is elected, much to everyone's shock.: Guest star: Rolanda Watts as Reshonda Watson
46	25	"The Bad and the Ugly" "The Good, the Bad, the Ugly"	Lenord Robinson	James E. West II	December 5, 2003	227
LaCienega and ordinary-looking classmate Agatha Ordinario with long brown hair enter a singing competition (similar to American Idol) where the winner gets to sing with R&B/Soul singer Alicia Keys. Agatha is the better singer by far, but when Wizard Kelly fixes the votes, LaCienega is forced to make a tough decision.: Guest stars: Alicia Keys as herself, Randy Jackson as himself, Tim Curry as Percival, Brian Dunkleman as himself, and Erica Rivera as Agatha Ordinario
47	26	"Smackmania 6: Mongo vs. Mama's Boy"	T.J. House	T. Smith III	December 26, 2003	228
Oscar films a new Proud Snax commercial with world champion wrestler Mongo, but Mongo falls very ill after trying the snacks while filming. The angry wrestler forces Oscar to defend his title belt on tv, which Oscar tries to get out of. Suga Mama decides to wrestle for him, but Oscar shows up at the arena after his family berates him for walking out of the match. In his match, Oscar gets pummeled, but Suga Mama makes the save. The events get the attention of promoter Lance McDougal, who seeks to make them stars. Oscar and Suga Mama become the biggest names in wrestling, but Oscar grows tired of being in Suga Mama's shadow and suggests firing her and replacing her with Lance's assistant Jasmine, dubbed "Hot Mama". However, Mongo suddenly returns to the ring, wanting his title belt back. Without Suga Mama, Oscar gets badly beat, but Suga Mama decides to get involved at the last second. Unfortunately, their wrestling careers come to an end when Mongo's mother shows up.: Guest stars: Michael Clarke Duncan as Mongo, Ted McGinley as Lance McDougal and Traci Bingham as Jasmine
48	27	"Suga Mama's Believers"	T.J. House	Dana Hali	February 16, 2004	224
Penny and her friends form a baseball team, but they struggle due to Oscar's terrible coaching. Suga Mama steps up and becomes the new coach, and the team improves immediately. Known as the "Believers", they win 9 straight games and earn a spot in the championship final. Their opponents are coached by Cool Papa Mac, an old rival of Suga Mama's from her baseball days. Papa Mac reminds Suga Mama of how she and her team got beat by him and the Nergo League All Stars several years ago. This triggers repressed memories for Suga Mama, who abandons the team. However, while the game is happening, Suga Mama is inspired to return, and makes it just in time for the last inning. Using unconventional strategy, Suga Mama helps the Believers score 4 runs in the last inning to win the game.
49	28	"Twins to Tweens"	T.J. House	Sabrina D. Campbell	April 24, 2004	226
Penny, tired of babysitting her younger siblings, wishes they were old enough to take care of themselves. Al Roker grants Penny's wish and turns Cece and Bebe into teens, but they turn out to be a lot more popular than her.: Guest stars: Al Roker as himself, Lee Thompson Young as Teen Bebe, and Sicily Sewell as Teen Cece
50	29	"She Drives Me Crazy"	T.J. House	Calvin Brown, Jr.	August 5, 2005	230
Suga Mama runs into trouble with the law when she commits multiple traffic violations while out with Papi. In the ensuing melée, Penny, who had been trying to get her to stop, suffers a hairline fracture after her bike skidded across the oil and Dijonay landed hard on her leg. It is then discovered that Suga Mama has been driving for decades with an expired license. Trudy ultimately takes care of Penny and helps Suga Mama get around town, but she is quickly driven to the brink. Oscar then takes Suga Mama to the DMV to renew her license. While Suga Mama passes her vision and written test with flying colors, she wrecks the DMV during the driving test. Depressed, Suga Mama confines herself to her home, refusing to talk to anyone. The family decides to check on her, and when Suga Mama mistakes Penny for Puff, they bring in Dr. Payne, who concludes that Suga Mama is legally blind. Dr. Payne gives Suga Mama new glasses, which help her vision. She returns to the DMV, and this time succeeds in getting her driver's license. Later, she drives Penny to the football game, but loses her glasses and starts driving out of control again.: Note(s): This episode was originally scheduled to air on January 9, 2004. It got delayed until August the following year.
51	30	"Who You Calling a Sissy?"	T.J. House, Douglas McCarthy, & Lenord Robinson	Doreen Spicer	August 12, 2005	203
Michael and LaCienega are planning on going to the dance together, mainly because Michael has prepared an exotic dress for her. Soon after Michael gets called a sissy, the bullies get a traumatizing experience from a bully version of Michael. Meanwhile, Trudy, Sunset, and Suga Mama take Salsa Dancing lessons.: Absent: BeBe and CeCe.; Note(s): This episode was pulled after its initial airing due to regarding Michael Collins' orientation while being called a sissy at the time. The ban is lifted as of 2020 and is available to watch on Disney+. Further to that extent, Michael is later confirmed to be gender non-conforming.
52	31	"Psycho Duck"	T.J. House	Beverly D. Hunter	August 19, 2005	216
Penny rescues a duck from drowning, and the duck takes an instant liking to her. The Prouds then take the duck in to nurse him back to health. However, when he begins following Penny around, Penny gets fed up and tells him to go home. This causes the duck, Chester, to go psycho, at everyone else's expense.

=== Crossover (2005) ===
Title	Directed by	Written by	Original release date	Prod. code
"Spats"	Victor Cook	Heather Lombard & Evan Gore	August 12, 2005	210 (L&S:TS)
The Proud Family comes to visit Hawaii and stay in the "bed and not breakfast" for their visit. Experiment 397 is on the loose, causing people to fight with each other.: Notes: This Lilo & Stitch: The Series episode is a crossover between that series and The Proud Family.; The events of this crossover episode is during the second and final season of Lilo & Stitch: The Series.; This is the only crossover episode to not be from a Disney Television Animation series.

== TV movie (2005) ==
Title	Directed by	Written by	Original release date
The Proud Family Movie	Bruce W. Smith	Ralph Farquhar, Calvin Brown, Jr., John Patrick White & Stiles White	August 19, 2005
The day before Penny's 16th birthday, her dad insists that she can't be a Spare Change dancer. However, Penny sneaks out of the house, and meets the rapper 15 Cent. Meanwhile, her dad failed to enter a snack academy. 15 Cent drives her home and Penny kisses him, and as her father yells, she's embarrassed. Penny is given the worst grounding she has ever received, and a rift begins between father and child, the culmination of the entire series. Her mom, Trudy, gives Penny the birthday present from her dad. All of a sudden, her family is invited on a cruise ship.: Guest stars: Omarion as 15 Cent and LisaRaye as the Dancing Choreographer; Note: The events of this movie were later retconned as a dream in the Louder and Prouder episode "Us Again" (2023).
