= Group W Films =

Group W Films is a film production company which was an offshoot of Westinghouse Broadcasting.

Richard Pack was president from 1968 to 1972.

In December 1968 the company signed a contract with Australia's NLT Films to make two movies a year for five years, starting with Squeeze a Flower and Wake in Fright. They only made those two films with NLT.

== Select filmography ==
- The Violent Enemy (1967)
- The Man Outside (1967)
- Amsterdam Affair (1968)
- The Limbo Line (1967)
- Madigan's Millions (1968)
- The Ravine (1969)
- Taste of Excitement (1969)
- Squeeze a Flower (1970)
- One Day in the Life of Ivan Denisovich (1970)
- Wake in Fright (1971)
- Eagle in a Cage (1972)
- Baxter! (1973)
