= Thom Noble =

British film editor

- Occupation: film editor
- Spouse: Pepita Fairfax (m. 1976, divorced)

Thom Noble is a British film editor who won an Academy Award and an ACE Eddie Award for the film Witness (1985). He was nominated for the Academy Award and the BAFTA Award for Best Editing for the film Thelma & Louise (1991).

In 2018, he was on jury for the Mumbai International Film Festival.

== Selected filmography ==
Year	Film	Director	Notes
1966	Fahrenheit 451	François Truffaut	
1967	The Violent Enemy	Don Sharp	
1967	The Man Outside	Samuel Gallu	
1970	The Man Who Had Power Over Women	John Krish	
1971	And Now for Something Completely Different	Ian MacNaughton	
1972	The Strange Vengeance of Rosalie	Jack Starrett	
1973	Redneck	Silvio Narizzano	
1974	Billy Two Hats	Ted Kotcheff	Second collaboration with Ted Kotcheff
1974	The Apprenticeship of Duddy Kravitz	Ted Kotcheff	Third collaboration with Ted Kotcheff
1975	Rosebud	Otto Preminger	
1975	Inside Out	Peter Duffell	
1976	It Shouldn't Happen to a Vet	Eric Till	First collaboration with Eric Till
1977	Joseph Andrews	Tony Richardson	
1977	Black Joy	Anthony Simmons	
1977	The Mighty Peking Man	Ho Meng Hua	
1978	Who Is Killing the Great Chefs of Europe?	Ted Kotcheff	Fourth collaboration with Ted Kotcheff
1979	Boardwalk	Stephen Verona	
1981	Improper Channels	Eric Till	Second collaboration with Eric Till
1981	Tattoo	Bob Brooks	
1984	Red Dawn	John Milius	
1985	Witness	Peter Weir	First collaboration with Peter Weir
1986	Poltergeist II: The Other Side	Brian Gibson	
1986	The Mosquito Coast	Peter Weir	Second collaboration with Peter Weir
1988	Switching Channels	Ted Kotcheff	Ninth collaboration with Ted Kotcheff
1989	Winter People	Ted Kotcheff	Tenth collaboration with Ted Kotcheff
1990	Mountains of the Moon	Bob Rafelson	
1990	The Exorcist III	William Peter Blatty	Uncredited
1990	The Exorcist III: Legion	William Peter Blatty	Director's cut
1991	Thelma & Louise	Ridley Scott	
1992	Final Analysis	Phil Joanou	
1992	Body of Evidence	Uli Edel	
1994	Color of Night	Richard Rush	Uncredited
1994	The Hudsucker Proxy	Joel Coen	
1994	Trial by Jury	Heywood Gould	Uncredited
1994	English, August	Dev Benegal	Uncredited
1995	The Scarlet Letter	Roland Joffé	
1996	The Island of Dr. Moreau	John Frankenheimer	Uncredited
1996	Feeling Minnesota	Steven Baigelman	Uncredited
1998	The Mask of Zorro	Martin Campbell	First collaboration with Martin Campbell
1999	Inspector Gadget	David Kellogg	
2000	Vertical Limit	Martin Campbell	Second collaboration with Martin Campbell
2002	Reign of Fire	Rob Bowman	
2005	Flightplan	Robert Schwentke	First collaboration with Robert Schwentke
2006	The Last Time	Michael Caleo	
2008	Passengers	Rodrigo García	
2009	The Time Traveler's Wife	Robert Schwentke	Second collaboration with Robert Schwentke
2010	Red	Robert Schwentke	Third collaboration with Robert Schwentke
2012	Alex Cross	Rob Cohen	
2015	Point Break	Ericson Core	
2016	A Family Man	Mark Williams	
2018	Rajma Chawal	Leena Yadav	
2024	Lumina	Gino J.H. McKoy	

Editorial department
Year	Film	Director	Role	Notes
1963	Lancelot and Guinevere	Cornel Wilde	First assistant editor	Uncredited
1963	Girl in the Headlines	Michael Truman	First assistant editor	Uncredited
1964	The Third Secret	Charles Crichton	Assistant editor	Uncredited
1964	Rattle of a Simple Man	Muriel Box	Assistant editor	Uncredited
1965	The Amorous Adventures of Moll Flanders	Terence Young	Assistant editor	
1966	Arabesque	Stanley Donen	Assistant editor	Uncredited
1971	Wake in Fright	Ted Kotcheff	Post-production coordinator	First collaboration with Ted Kotcheff
1979	North Dallas Forty	Ted Kotcheff	Editorial consultant	Fifth collaboration with Ted Kotcheff
1983	Uncommon Valor	Ted Kotcheff	Editorial consultant	Eighth collaboration with Ted Kotcheff
2005	Soldier of God	W.D. Hogan	Consulting editor	
2019	The Wake of Light	Renji Philip	Editor consultant	

Actor
Year	Film	Director	Role
1994	The Hudsucker Proxy	Joel Coen	Thorstenson Finlandson

Additional crew
Year	Film	Director	Role	Notes
1982	Split Image	Ted Kotcheff	Visual consultant	Sixth collaboration with Ted Kotcheff

Second unit director or assistant director
Year	Film	Director	Role
1968	Amsterdam Affair	Gerry O'Hara	Second unit director

Thanks
Year	Film	Director	Role
2019	The Planters	Alexandra Kotcheff; Hannah Leder	Special thanks
2020	Fight of Fury	Shuny Bee	Special thanks
2024	Dante's Inferno	Boris Acosta	Special thanks

Visual effects
Year	Film	Director	Role	Notes
1982	First Blood	Ted Kotcheff	Visual consultant	Seventh collaboration with Ted Kotcheff
