= Trio Film =

British production company

Trio Film is a short lived British production company that operated in the late 1960s.

== Select filmography ==
- The Violent Enemy (1967)
- The Man Outside (1967)
- Amsterdam Affair (1968)
- The Limbo Line (1968)
- The Vixens (1969)
- Taste of Excitement (1969)
