= Larry Smith (cinematographer) =

British cinematographer

- Occupations: Cinematographer, film director, screenwriter, producer
- Years active: 1975–present

Larry Smith ASC, BSC is an English cinematographer.

== Early life ==
Born in London, Smith left school at age 15 to work as an electrician at Shepperton Studios.

== Career ==
Smith began as the chief electrician on Stanley Kubrick's Barry Lyndon (1975). He went on to work with Kubrick again as a gaffer on The Shining (1980) before making his debut as cinematographer with Eyes Wide Shut (1999).

In addition to cinematography, Smith also made his directing debut with the 2015 film Trafficker, which he also wrote and produced.

== Filmography ==
=== Film ===
| Year | Title | Director | Notes |
|---|---|---|---|
| 1999 | Eyes Wide Shut | Stanley Kubrick | |
| 2002 | The Piano Player | Jean-Pierre Roux | |
| 2003 | Fear X | Nicolas Winding Refn | |
| 2004 | Red Dust | Tom Hooper | |
| 2008 | Bronson | Nicolas Winding Refn | |
| 2009 | The Blue Mansion | Glen Goei | |
| 2011 | The Guard | John Michael McDonagh | |
| 2013 | Austenland | Jerusha Hess | |
| 2013 | Only God Forgives | Nicolas Winding Refn | |
| 2014 | Calvary | John Michael McDonagh | |
| 2015 | The Man Who Knew Infinity | Matthew Brown | |
| 2015 | Trafficker | Himself | Also credited as producer and writer |
| 2018 | Tau | Federico D'Alessandro | |
| 2019 | Two/One | Juan Cabral | |
| 2020 | Puppy Love | Michael Maxxis | |
| 2021 | Things Heard & Seen | Shari Springer Berman; Robert Pulcini | |
| 2021 | The Forgiven | John Michael McDonagh | |
| 2022 | Rogue Agent | Adam Patterson; Declan Lawn | |
| 2023 | Luther: The Fallen Sun | Jamie Payne | |
| 2023 | Dark Harvest | David Slade | |
| 2024 | Lumina | Gino McKoy | With Raquel Gallego |
| 2025 | Giant | Rowan Athale | |
| 2026 | The Fix | Guy Moshe | |

=== Television ===
| Year | Title | Director | Notes |
|---|---|---|---|
| 1999 | Cold Feet | Tom Hooper | 2 episodes |
| 2009 | Agatha Christie's Marple | Nicolas Winding Refn | Episode "Nemesis" |
| 2018 | The Alienist | David Petrarca | Episode "Psychopathia Sexualis" |
| 2020 | The Letter for the King | Felix Thompson; Alex Holmes | 3 episodes |
| 2024 | Sunny | Lucy Tcherniak; Dearbhla Walsh; Colin Bucksey; Makoto Nagahisa | 7 episodes |

Miniseries

| Year | Title | Director |
|---|---|---|
| 2001 | Love in a Cold Climate | Tom Hooper |
| 2003 | Prime Suspect: The Last Witness | Tom Hooper |
| 2005 | Elizabeth I | Tom Hooper |
| 2016 | Dark Angel | Brian Percival |
