= Seven Days of Kwanzaa =

- The Proud Family episode
- Episode no.: Season 1 Episode 11
- Directed by: Bruce W. Smith
- Written by: Wayne Stamps
- Production code: 119
- Original air date: December 7, 2001

Guest appearances
- Vivica A. Fox as Margaret; Samuel L. Jackson as Joseph; Raven-Symoné as Stephanie; Pat Crawford Brown as Agnus

Episode chronology
← Previous "Don't Leave Home Without It"	Next → "Makeover"

"Seven Days of Kwanzaa" is the eleventh episode of the first season of the American animated sitcom The Proud Family. The episode was originally broadcast on the cable network Disney Channel on December 7, 2001. Written by Wayne Stamps and directed by Bruce W. Smith, "Seven Days of Kwanzaa" follows the Proud family being taught an important lesson about the true meaning of Christmas and Kwanzaa by a homeless family.

== Plot ==
As the Proud family goes Christmas shopping, they meet a homeless family. Oscar does not do anything to help them, but Trudy tells Oscar to find the family and give them some money. When Penny and Oscar find them, Penny ask them if they want to have a Christmas dinner with them, to which they accept, Oscar not being so happy. On Christmas, they arrive seven hours early and presents the Prouds with a fruit cake. No one thinks much of it, so they give it to Bobby, and he throws it out the window. When Penny gives them their presents, they do not seem to like them. Trudy, feeling a bit concerned, asks them. They say that they celebrate Kwanzaa. As the Prouds were unknowing of the holiday, the family tells the Prouds all about it and celebrate it with them.

== Voice cast ==
- Kyla Pratt as Penny Proud
- Tommy Davidson as Oscar Proud
- Paula Jai Parker as Trudy Proud
- Jo Marie Payton as Suga Mama
- Tara Strong as:
  - BeBe Proud
  - CeCe Proud
  - Puff
- Karen Malina White as Dijonay Jones
- Soleil Moon Frye as Zoey Howzer
- Orlando Brown as Sticky Webb
- Cedric the Entertainer as Bobby Proud

=== Guest stars ===
- Vivica A. Fox as Margaret
- Samuel L. Jackson as Joseph
- Raven-Symoné as Stephanie
- Pat Crawford Brown as Angus

== Reception ==
"Seven Days of Kwanzaa" has received a generally positive reception, often seen as a holiday classic. Blavity's Trey Mangum wrote that this episode is a must-watch for various reasons, such as it teaching the viewer about Kwanzaa. Screen Rant's Jordan Payeur states that this episode proves the show's educational value. Variety cited the episode as one of "The 35 Best Christmas, Hanukkah and Kwanzaa TV Episodes of All Time". Collider cited it as one of "The 13 Best Episodes of The Proud Family". BuzzFeed lists it as one of the "10 Christmas Episodes From Black Sitcoms To Put You In The Holiday Spirit".
