= Lumina (film) =

2024 American science fiction horror film

- Theatrical release poster
- Directed by: Gino McKoy
- Screenplay by: Gino McKoy
- Produced by: Gino McKoy; Lynda McKoy; David Seychell; Hudson McKoy
- Starring: Rupert Lazarus; Sidney Nicole Rogers; Andrea Tivadar; Ken Lawson; Eleanor Williams; Eric Roberts; Emily Hall
- Cinematography: Raquel Gallego; Larry Smith
- Edited by: Thom Noble
- Music by: Gino McKoy; Matthew Sargent
- Production companies: Luminamovie LLC; Goldove Entertainment
- Distributed by: Goldove
- Release date: July 12, 2024
- Running time: 120 minutes
- Country: United States
- Languages: English; French; Arabic

Lumina is a 2024 American science fiction horror film written and directed by Gino McKoy. It stars Rupert Lazarus, Sidney Nicole Rogers, Andrea Tivadar, Ken Lawson, Eleanor Williams, Eric Roberts, and Emily Hall. The film was produced by Gino McKoy, Lynda McKoy, David Seychell, and Hudson McKoy. The film's editor was Thom Noble.

The film was re-released on September 20, 2024, after an initial release in July 2024.

== Plot ==
Alex, a wealthy young man, hosts a party at his mansion to introduce his new girlfriend, Tatiana, to his close friends. Among the guests are Patricia, a free-spirited videographer, and Delilah, Alex's ex-girlfriend who still harbors feelings for him. Tensions rise when Delilah arrives uninvited, leading to awkward interactions. Despite the underlying strain.

As the night unfolds, a sudden and blinding light engulfs the area. In an instant, Tatiana vanishes without a trace, leaving the group in shock. The authorities are unable to provide answers, and Tatiana's disappearance remains a mystery.

Months pass, and Alex becomes consumed by Tatiana's disappearance. He grows increasingly unstable, immersing himself in online conspiracy theories and UFO forums. Convinced that Tatiana was abducted by extraterrestrial beings and is being held in a Deep Underground Military Base (DUMB), Alex becomes determined to rescue her. He reaches out to George, an old acquaintance with similar beliefs, and convinces Patricia and Delilah to join him on a perilous journey to uncover the truth.

The group travels from Los Angeles to the deserts of Morocco, following leads that point to the existence of a secret underground facility. Along the way, they encounter Thom, a self-proclaimed alien abduction expert who claims to have insider knowledge about government conspiracies and extraterrestrial life. Thom reveals that he possesses a spaceship hidden in his shed and has previously worked with secret government agencies.

As they delve deeper into the desert, the group experiences a series of bizarre and terrifying events. They are pursued by mysterious lights in the sky, encounter strange creatures, and face hostile forces determined to keep the secrets of the DUMB hidden. The line between reality and hallucination blurs as they confront their deepest fears.

Within the underground facility, the group uncovers horrifying experiments conducted on humans and aliens alike. They witness grotesque scenes of mutilation and genetic manipulation, revealing the extent of the government's involvement in extraterrestrial research. The facility is filled with eerie hallways, advanced weaponry, and monstrous creatures that defy explanation.

As the group attempts to escape, they are confronted by the full force of the facility's defenses. In a desperate bid for survival, they must navigate treacherous terrain, evade deadly traps, and confront the horrifying truth about Tatiana's fate. The journey tests their sanity and forces them to confront the unimaginable.

== Cast ==
- Rupert Lazarus as Alex
- Sidney Nicole Rogers as Patricia
- Andrea Tivadar as Delilah
- Ken Lawson as George
- Eleanor Williams as Tatiana
- Eric Roberts as Thom
- Emily Hall as Chere

== Production ==
=== Pre-production ===
In 2020, SAG-AFTRA instructed its members to avoid working on the film Lumina, which allegedly failed to comply with required COVID-19 safety standards as per the union's Global Rule One, making it one of the few movies to proceed without union support.

=== Filming ===
Lumina was filmed in Marrakesh, Ouarzazate, Agafay, and the Atlas Mountains areas of Morocco. The sci-fi sets were built at the CLA studios in Ouarzazate.

== Reception ==
On the review aggregator website Rotten Tomatoes, 0% of 17 critics' reviews are positive. Metacritic, which uses a weighted average, assigned the film a score of 6 out of 100, based on 4 critics, indicating "overwhelming dislike". Metacritic named it the worst movie of 2024.

Brian Tallerico of RogerEbert.com gave the film zero out of four stars and wrote, "There are bad movies, there are really bad movies, and then there's Lumina, a film so breathtaking in its overall incompetence that one starts to wonder if it's not intentionally so in the hope of being the next The Room or Birdemic. How else to explain some of the laughable shot choices, inconsistent characters, nonsensical plotting, and dialogue that sounds like it was either produced by A.I. or Google Translate of a script written in another language?" Jeffrey M. Anderson of Common Sense Media said that it is a "possible contender to join the list of The Worst Movies of All Time", while Michael Gingold of Rue Morgue described it as "the kind of awkward flick that pops up every now and then: An ambitious indie by a do-it-all filmmaker ... that bucks the odds and gets a nationwide release, only to prove it has no business playing anywhere but late-night cable."

Michael Nordine of Variety also gave the film a negative review, writing, "Its ambitions are lofty, but they're also undermined at nearly every turn by chintzy visual effects that prove more distracting than immersive and uniformly wooden performances. It wants to be a space opera but is closer to a soap opera, albeit one that would air on Syfy rather than CBS." Zachary Moser of Screen Rant likewise faulted the film for missing scenes, ADR, clumsy editing, and an inexplicable storyline, while Shaina Weatherhead of Collider said viewers expecting a compelling alien-abduction thriller would likely leave confused and disappointed.

== Controversy and lawsuit ==
According to The Hollywood Reporter, Goldove claims it invested over $4 million in marketing Lumina after being assured by Wild About Movies that the film would be shown in over a thousand prime-location theaters with favorable show times. The spending covered social media ads, billboards, metro station promotions in major cities, special events, and a sweepstakes featuring a $50,000 space rover from the film.

The lawsuit states that Goldove was promised Lumina would screen on at least 300 AMC screens and 500 Regal and Cinemark screens.

The complaint claims the film was shown in far fewer theaters than promised, often in remote locations, at off-peak times, and only for brief runs.

Under the agreement, Wild About Movies would earn $275,000 if Lumina opened on 1,500 screens, with no payment due for fewer than 750; however, Nasson says he still received $50,000 despite the threshold not being met.
