= The Violent Enemy =

1967 British film by Don Sharp

- Directed by: Don Sharp
- Written by: Edmund Ward
- Based on: novel A Candle for the Dead by Hugh Marlow (Jack Higgins)
- Produced by: Wilfred Eades executive William Gell
- Starring: Tom Bell; Susan Hampshire; Ed Begley; Noel Purcell
- Cinematography: Alan Hume
- Edited by: Thom Noble
- Music by: John Scott (as Patrick John Scott)
- Production companies: Trio Film; Group W Films
- Distributed by: Monarch Film Corporation; London Independent Producers
- Release date: 18 May 1969
- Running time: 94 minutes
- Country: United Kingdom
- Language: English
- Budget: £250,000

The Violent Enemy (also known as Came the Hero) is a 1969 film directed by Don Sharp and starring Tom Bell, Susan Hampshire, Ed Begley, and Noel Purcell. It was written by Edmund Ward based on the 1966 novel A Candle for the Dead by Hugh Marlow (as Jack Higgins).

The plot concerns an IRA plot to blow up a British power station.

== Premise ==
IRA bomb expert Sean Rogan escapes from prison, and is reluctantly recruited into a scheme by IRA leader Colum O'More to blow up a British electronics factory back in Ireland. Rogan wants a peaceful life but O'More insists.

Rogan is given Hannah Costello to assist him. Inspector Sullivan is suspicious of Rogan.

== Cast ==
- Tom Bell as Sean Rogan
- Susan Hampshire as Hannah Costello
- Ed Begley as Colum O'More
- Noel Purcell as John Michael Leary
- Jon Laurimore as Austin
- Michael Standing as Fletcher
- Philip O'Flynn as Inspector Sullivan
- Sam Kydd as Shorty

== Original novel ==
The film was based on the 1966 novel A Candle for the Dead by Hugh Marlow (better known as Jack Higgins). The Observer called it "fast and exciting". The sale of the movie rights enabled Higgins to quit teaching and write full time.

The book would subsequently be reissued in 1969 as The Violent Enemy by Jack Higgins.

== Production ==
Don Sharp had previously worked with the producers on Taste of Excitement (which would be released after this film). He says the original title of the film was Candle for the Dead. The title was changed to Came the Hero when filming began in Waterford in October 1968 and was finished by December. Sharp says it had a "nice cast" with Begley being "marvellous... it was a very good movie to make. I loved filming in Ireland. Tom Bell was marvellous".

== Release ==
Sharp says "everyone was delighted" with the film but just as it was released in May 1969, IRA activity started up again causing the film to be pulled.

The film was given a small re-release in early 1971.

== Critical reception ==
The Monthly Film Bulletin called it a "moderately interesting if not particularly convincing melodrama".

Western Daily Press called it "a moderate suspenseful film."

Sky Movies described it as "one of only a handful of British films to deal with the troubles in Ireland. Played as a melodrama, the film is efficiently directed by action specialist Don Sharp. Tom Bell has the right air of disillusionment about him as the IRA man who's learned moderation in a British jail".

The Radio Times noted, "it's efficiently made, if unsurprising, and familiar American actor Ed Begley is worth watching as the fanatical Irish mastermind behind the scheme."

The Independent said "The sum of all these substantial parts is less than a masterpiece. Too much of a hint of 'Oirish' accents among English actors. Too much talk of The Cause. Too little movement in the clock above Leary's bar, which is forever stuck at seven minutes past nine. Still it fills an idle hour and a half well enough."
