= Above Us the Waves =

1955 British film by Ralph Thomas

- Original UK poster
- Directed by: Ralph Thomas
- Screenplay by: Robin Estridge
- Based on: Above Us the Waves by C. E. T. Warren & James Benson
- Produced by: William MacQuitty (executive), Earl St John
- Starring: John Mills; John Gregson; Donald Sinden
- Cinematography: Ernest Steward
- Edited by: Gerald Thomas
- Music by: Arthur Benjamin
- Production company: London Independent Producers
- Distributed by: GFD
- Release date: 29 March 1955
- Running time: 99 minutes
- Country: United Kingdom
- Language: English
- Budget: £158,772

Above Us the Waves is a 1955 British war film about human torpedo and midget submarine attacks in Norwegian fjords against the German battleship Tirpitz. Directed by Ralph Thomas, it is based on two true-life attacks by British commando frogmen, first using Chariot manned torpedoes in Operation Title in 1942, and then X-Craft midget submarines in Operation Source in 1943. Filmed at Pinewood Studios, England, with outdoor scenes in Guernsey, some of the original war equipment was used in the film.

== Plot ==
The Royal Navy (RN) is concerned about attacks on convoys by German submarines while having to keep "half the fleet" guarding against the German battleship Tirpitz. Tirpitz is 60 miles from the sea inside a Norwegian fjord, and attempts by the Royal Air Force (RAF) to sink her have failed. Commander Fraser (Mills) is determined to prove that attack by human torpedoes is practical, despite scepticism from RN higher echelons.

Fraser assembles and trains a force of British commando frogmen officers and ratings to use the Mk I Human Torpedo manned torpedoes (Chariots) at their Scottish base. After being refused permission to attack Tirpitz, due to the RN policy of avoiding unproven weaponry, the team manage to attach dummy limpet mines to the admiral's own ship.

Their success results in Fraser's force being authorised to attack Tirpitz with the initial operation using the Chariots. The attack fails and the crew are forced to abandon ship and land in Norway. They walk to neutral Sweden from where they are returned to Scotland.

For the next operation, the crews are trained to use small X-Craft submarines: X1, X2 and X3. The three craft are initially towed over the North Sea by conventional submarines and then left to penetrate the fjord where Tirpitz is anchored.

They manage to approach undetected to lay their "side-cargoes" under the ship's hull, each containing two tons of explosive amatol. X2 is badly damaged and cannot re-surface, but the crew decide to stay on board to prevent "giving the game away". The other two submarines succeed in laying their mines before the crews scuttle them. They are captured by the crew of Tirpitz, to be taken away as prisoners of war. While some German crew are aggressive, attempting to machine gun the men in the water, the captain of Tirpitz salutes them as "brave men", providing them blankets and schnapps.

The mines explode as planned, badly damaging Tirpitz. The crew of the stranded X2, hearing the explosions, attempt to escape. However, X2's side cargoes have flooded, which causes them to spontaneously explode, destroying X2 and killing her crew.

== Main cast ==
- John Mills as Commander Fraser
- John Gregson as Lieutenant Alec Duffy
- Donald Sinden as Lieutenant Tom Corbett
- James Robertson Justice as Admiral Ryder
- Michael Medwin as Steward Smart
- James Kenney as Abercrombie
- O. E. Hasse as Captain of the Tirpitz
- Lee Patterson as Cox
- William Russell as Ramsey
- Theodore Bikel as German officer
- Harry Towb as McCleery
- Cyril Chamberlain as Chief Petty Officer Chubb
- Anthony Wager as George
- Leslie Weston as Winley
- Lyndon Brook as Diver navigator, X2
- Thomas Heathcote as Hutchins
- Anthony Newley as Engineer, X2
- John Horsley as Lieutenant Anderson Royal Norwegian Navy
- William Franklyn as No. 1, X2
- Guido Lorraine as German-language interpreter
- Raymond Francis as Officer on towing submarine
- Walter Gotell as German officer on Tirpitz (uncredited)

== Production notes ==
The screenplay was based on the book Above Us the Waves by C. E. T. Warren and James Benson, which had been published in 1953.

Director Ralph Thomas says the film was made because producer William MacQuitty "was very involved with the Navy and he loved submarines." MacQuitty had a production company in partnership with Sydney Box called London Independent Producers, which tended to use the same core creative personnel. They purchased film rights in 1952, before the book had been published.

The book became a best seller, selling over 350,000 copies and MacQuitty obtained finance from the Rank Organisation under Earl St. John. The British admiralty provided full co-operation. Thomas was given the job of directing after his tremendous success with Doctor in the House. Several of the cast from that film would appear in Above Us the Waves.

Shooting began on 20 September 1954 in Guernsey. Commander Donald Cameron, who commanded X-6 as a lieutenant and won the Victoria Cross during the operation, was an adviser to the film.

MacQuitty was an experienced diver, having spent over 500 hours under water. He personally supervised many of the underwater sequences.

Events in the film had minor differences, for example, the boat Arthur that carried the Chariot human torpedoes was named Ingebord in the film, and the X-class submarines used in Operation Source in 1943 were numbered X-5, X-6 and X-7, and X-5 was the craft that was lost. The real X-3 was lost in an earlier training exercise although the crew escaped using Davis escape apparatus.

The score was by Arthur Benjamin and performed under the direction of Muir Mathieson.

John Gregson played an Australian. "Australians are husky types", said producer McQuitty. "Gregson has made his part of Alec Duffy, midget submarine commander, good and husky."

"I am proud to be playing the part of an Australian", said Gregson. "During the war, when I was in the Royal Navy, I met many Australian fighting men. They were good fellows."

Donald Sinden's character was based on the true-life exploits of Sub-Lieutenant Robert Aitken, who died a few weeks after Sinden. In his first autobiography, A Touch of the Memoirs, Sinden said "I had to re-enact a deed originally performed by Commander Donald Cameron. While his X Craft was being towed across the North Sea, the cable picked up a floating mine which then moved along the cable and made straight for his midget. Cameron rushed forward and, lowering himself over the prow of his craft, managed gingerly to push the mine clear with his feet. Donald was our advisor on the film and told me modestly, "I couldn't think of anything else to do." He was awarded the VC. I wasn't because we used a dummy. But Donald could swim!"

The cast also included Anthony Wager, who had played a young Pip in Great Expectations (1946). John Mills, who played the older Pip, appeared opposite him.

== Reception ==
=== Box office ===
Above Us the Waves was the sixth most popular film at the British box office that year, after The Dam Busters, White Christmas, Doctor at Sea, The Colditz Story and Seven Brides for Seven Brothers. It helped John Mills to be voted the fifth most popular star in the country. According to the National Film Finance Corporation, the film made a comfortable profit. According to Kinematograph Weekly it was a "money maker" at the British box office in 1955.
