= The Man Outside (1967 film) =

British spy thriller by Samuel Gallu

- Directed by: Samuel Gallu
- Written by: Samuel Gallu; Julian Bond; Roger Marshall
- Produced by: William J. Gell
- Starring: Van Heflin; Heidelinde Weis; Pinkas Braun; Charles Gray
- Cinematography: Gilbert Taylor
- Edited by: Thom Noble
- Music by: Richard Arnell
- Production companies: Trio Film; Group W Films
- Distributed by: London Independent Producers (UK); Allied Artists (US)
- Release dates: 25 August 1967 (W. Germany); 1 May 1968 (London)
- Running time: 97 minutes
- Country: United Kingdom
- Language: English

The Man Outside is a 1967 British spy thriller film directed by Samuel Gallu and starring Van Heflin, Heidelinde Weis and Pinkas Braun. It was first released in Austria and West Germany in 1967, and in Britain in 1968. It was written by Gallu, Julian Bond and Roger Marshall, based on the 1959 novel Double Agent by Gene Stackelberg.

== Plot ==
A disgraced former CIA agent attempts to bring a Russian defector safely to his former bosses.

== Cast ==
- Van Heflin as Bill MacLean
- Heidelinde Weis as Kay Sebastian
- Pinkas Braun as Rafe Machek
- Peter Vaughan as Nikolai Volkov
- Charles Gray as Charles Griddon
- Paul Maxwell as Judson Murphy
- Ronnie Barker as George Venaxas
- Linda Marlowe as Dorothy
- Gary Cockrell as Brune Parry
- Larry Cross as Austen
- Bill Nagy as Morehouse
- Carole Ann Ford as Cindy

== Production ==
The film's sets were designed by the art director Peter Mullins.

== Critical reception ==
The Monthly Film Bulletin wrote: "A standard espionage adventure on the spying-is-a-dirty-business theme, with the usual quota of red herrings, loose ends and double crosses. Van Heflin gives Maclean a rather attractive line in tired charm that underlines his disenchantment with international intrigue. Still, it is hard to maintain sympathy with any spy who has not yet learned from previous films the sheer folly of meeting other agents at Charing Cross Pier. And the banality of the photography (mostly shot from a "seat in the stalls" perspective) is heightened rather than relieved by the occasional use of arty upside-down shots."

Kine Weekly wrote: This is a good, tense, spy thriller that should please most types of audience. Reliable action attraction. ... It spends its opening reels rather wordily getting the situation established but once this is done it swings into the action, keeps the mystery on the boil and is quite fair with its red herrings: all of which makes for good entertainment without any pretence or artistic frills."

Variety wrote: "Both writing and direction are crisp and tense and spiced with danger and high-pressure situations, yet never wavering into the usual incredible fireworks of the spy film. Set in London, the familiar streets, houses and shops are given an air of brooding menace, fancily alded by some good color lensing by Gil Taylor and sharp editing by Tom Noble. Highspot situations include a showdown battle in a warehouse and an apartment and an atmospheric rendezvous in a London church."
