= In the Cut (TV series) =

American television sitcom (2015–2020)

- Genre: Sitcom
- Created by: Bentley Kyle Evans
- Starring: Dorien Wilson; John Marshall Jones; Ken Lawson; Jackée Harry; Kellita Smith; Dorion Renaud; Laura Hayes; Mark Curry; Kim Coles
- Country of origin: United States
- Original language: English
- No. of seasons: 7
- No. of episodes: 85

Production
- Executive producers: Bentley Kyle Evans; Trenten Gumbs
- Running time: 22 minutes
- Production companies: Bent Outta Shape Productions; 3G Films; Harvest Studios; Bounce Original Production

Original release
- Network: Bounce TV
- Release: August 25, 2015 – November 18, 2020

In the Cut is an American television sitcom created by Bentley Kyle Evans that aired on Bounce TV from August 25, 2015, to November 18, 2020. The series stars Dorien Wilson as Jay Weaver, a barbershop owner who meets a young man named Kenny (Ken Lawson) the unknown biological son from a fling thirty years ago. The first season has six episodes. John Marshall Jones, Kellita Smith, Dorion Renaud, and Laura Hayes are also series regulars while Vanessa Bell Calloway and Golden Brooks had recurring roles.

In the Cut has become the most-watched original series premiere in Bounce TV history. On April 13, 2016, Bounce TV renewed the show for a second season. On April 14, 2016, Bounce TV renewed the show for a third season which premiered on July 11, 2017. On August 3, 2017, the show was renewed for a fourth season that premiered on July 2, 2018.

The fifth season premiered on July 15, 2019.

On March 19, 2020, it was announced that the sixth season would premiere on April 1, 2020.

== Premise ==
A local barbershop owner named Jay Weaver meets his illegitimate son Kenny he never knew about, 30 years after he's born. After Kenny shows up looking for his father, the two attempt to start a relationship. After Jay allows Kenny to move in with him and work at the barbershop, the two begin a new journey as father and son. Jay also owns a beauty salon next door, which was previously owned by his ex-wife Nadine and is now owned by his new wife Cheryl. Cheryl is a feisty business-savvy woman who runs the shop with her over-the-top sidekick Percy. The show follows Jay's best friend Smitty and Chef Mable who owns tables in the same strip mall.

== Cast and characters ==
=== Main ===
- Dorien Wilson as Jay Weaver, the owner of barbershop Jay's Chop Shop, and Kenny's father
- Ken Lawson as Kenny Clark, Jay's illegitimate son
- John Marshall Jones as Clevon "Smitty" Smith, Jay's best friend and fellow barber (season 1–6)
- Dorion Renaud as Percy, a hairstylist and Cheryls best friend. (season 1-7)
- Jackée Harry as Nadine Weaver (season 1), Jay's ex-wife and former owner of Nadine's Shop
- Kellita Smith as Cheryl (season 2-7), the new owner of the beauty salon Cheryl's, and Jay's wife
- Laura Hayes as Mable (season 2–6), restaurant owner of Mable's Tables
- Mark Curry as Wade (season 7), Cheryl's ex-con brother
- Kim Coles as Trish Devoe (season 7), the new owner of Mable's Tables

=== Recurring ===
- Chastity Dotson as Angelique Peters, Kenny's wife
- Christy St. John as Karen (season 6–7), the waitress at Mable's Tables

=== Guest stars ===
- Golden Brooks as Dawn
- Trina McGee as Karen (Kenny's ex-wife)
- Steve Olson as Felix
- Earthquake as Rufus, Smitty and Kenny's landlord
- Stevie Mack as Barbershop Bill
- Kevin A. Ross as Judge Ross

== Episodes ==
Season	Episodes	Originally released	
Season	Episodes	First released	Last released
1	6	August 25, 2015	September 29, 2015
2	13	July 5, 2016	September 27, 2016
3	13	July 11, 2017	September 19, 2017
4	13	July 2, 2018	September 24, 2018
5	13	July 15, 2019	September 30, 2019
6	13	April 1, 2020	July 1, 2020
7	13	August 26, 2020	November 18, 2020

=== Season 1 (2015) ===
No. overall	No. in season	Title	Directed by	Written by	Original release date
1	1	"Pilot"	Bentley Kyle Evans	Bentley Kyle Evans	August 25, 2015
Longtime barber Jay Weaver is in for the surprise of his life when Kenny Clark shows up. Kenny is the son Jay never knew he had. At first, they don't get along, but soon Kenny finds a place to fit into Jay's life.
2	2	"Life Cut Short"	Bentley Kyle Evans	Alex Kavutskiy	September 1, 2015
After Jay's best friend, Smitty, suffers a minor fall, Jay decides it's time for his own doctor's check up. However, a misunderstanding leads Kenny and Jay's ex-wife, Nadine, to think that Jay is dying. Because everyone thinks Jay is dying, they treat him extremely nice. But Jay starts getting suspicious and believes they're all out to kill him!
3	3	"Gold Diggers for Dummies"	Bentley Kyle Evans	Clayton Thomas	September 8, 2015
Jay starts dating a young, beautiful woman. But Kenny thinks it too good to be true. In fact, he thinks Jay is being taken advantage of by a gold digger. Is he right, or will he ruin Jay's relationship? Meanwhile, Smitty gets caught up in a dominoes tournament with an old rival. The only thing is, Smitty doesn't know how to play the game!
4	4	"Like Father, Like Son"	Bentley Kyle Evans	Clayton Thomas	September 15, 2015
Kenny's past comes back to haunt him: an old flame and a girl who may – or may not – be his daughter. Meanwhile, Smitty starts dating Jay's ex. Not only does Smitty get jealous when he finds out she used to be with Jay, but Nadine starts to get jealous too after seeing her around Jay again.
5	5	"The Ball's in Your Court"	Bentley Kyle Evans	Bentley Kyle Evans	September 22, 2015
When Kenny's ex-wife comes back into the picture, we learn that Kenny is technically not yet divorced and still has feelings for his wife! It is very clear to everyone around that her intentions are not genuine. Meanwhile, Jay and Smitty have a falling out over a bet gone wrong that could end their lifelong friendship.
6	6	"The Beat Goes On"	Bentley Kyle Evans	Bentley Kyle Evans	September 29, 2015
Jay receives a "Dear Jay" letter from his ex-wife Nadine stating that she has deserted her beauty salon and eloped with a wealthy gentleman. Jay seeks to replace her with a qualified candidate that he is smitten by. Kenny is dealing with his own morals as he breaks the barber code and starts secretly cutting the hair of one of Smitty's customers behind his back.

=== Season 2 (2016) ===
No. overall	No. in season	Title	Directed by	Written by	Original release date
7	1	"All Good in the Hood"	Bentley Kyle Evans	Michael Anthony Snowden	July 5, 2016
Everyone gets competitive when the barbershop, the beauty salon, and Mabel's Tables all get nominated for an award. Kenny decides he wants to go to college.
8	2	"One Night Only"	Bentley Kyle Evans	Bentley Kyle Evans & Alex Kavutskiy	July 12, 2016
Jay and Smitty entertain to ladies for the night. Smitty allows Kenny to stay at his place to study.
9	3	"Beverly's Back"	Bentley Kyle Evans	Bentley Kyle Evans & Alex Kavutskiy	July 19, 2016
Kenny's mother, Beverly, comes to town for a surprise visit. Smitty has a bad case of the hiccups!
10	4	"Very Superstitious"	Bentley Kyle Evans	Bentley Kyle Evans & Alex Kauvtskiy	July 26, 2016
A strange man convinces Jay and Smitty that the barbershop is cursed.
11	5	"Easy Come, Easy Go"	Bentley Kyle Evans	Jay Phillips	August 2, 2016
Smitty gets a new smartphone and begins online dating. Jay receives more than he planned when he makes a withdrawal from the bank.
12	6	"Groundhog Jay"	Bentley Kyle Evans	Bentley Kyle Evans & Alex Kauvtskiy	August 9, 2016
For some strange reason, Jay has been reliving the same day over and over again.
13	7	"Love Sick"	Bentley Kyle Evans	Bentley Kyle Evans & Alex Kauvtskiy	August 16, 2016
Jay and Cheryl have a one-night stand and have a hard time remembering their date. Kenny proposes to Angelique. Smitty gets sick and is nursed by Mabel.
14	8	"Keep It Real"	Bentley Kyle Evans	Nile Evans	August 23, 2016
Jay agrees to have a reality television producer film around the barbershop, but personalities flare and chaos ensue once the camera turns on.
15	9	"Best Foot Forward"	Bentley Kyle Evans	Bentley Kyle Evans & Alex Kauvtskiy	August 30, 2016
Kenny starts dating his professor, who has terrible feet.
16	10	"Blood Pressure Is Thicker Than Water"	Bentley Kyle Evans	Bentley Kyle Evans & Alex Kauvtskiy	September 6, 2016
17	11	"Jailbreak"	Bentley Kyle Evans	Bentley Kyle Evans & Alex Kauvtskiy	September 13, 2016
Jay gets arrested due to some unpaid parking tickets he had in the past. Kenny's phone is stolen.
18	12	"Stellaaaaa"	Bentley Kyle Evans	Bentley Kyle Evans & Alex Kauvtskiy	September 20, 2016
Smitty's daughter Stella comes to town and Kenny has fallen in love.
19	13	"Whose Is It"	Bentley Kyle Evans	Bentley Kyle Evans & Alex Kauvtskiy	September 27, 2016
A pregnancy test is found in the barbershop and the guys try to figure out whose is it.

=== Season 3 (2017) ===
No. overall	No. in season	Title	Directed by	Written by	Original release date
20	1	"In The Doghouse"	Bentley Kyle Evans	Bentley Kyle Evans & Alex Kauvtskiy	July 11, 2017
All of the guys are in trouble with their women.
21	2	"Matter Of Principal"	Bentley Kyle Evans	Bentley Kyle Evans & Alex Kauvtskiy	July 11, 2017
Jay's friend is in town and he is planning on getting what's his. Kenny and Stella decide to break up.
22	3	"Sharing Is Caring"	Bentley Kyle Evans	Alex Kauvtskiy	July 18, 2017
23	4	"Blast From The Past"	Bentley Kyle Evans	Kylee Evans	July 25, 2017
A business woman comes into Jay's shop and changes everything. Mabel's old partner offers her a deal.
24	5	"The Jay Foundation"	Bentley Kyle Evans	RT Sketel	August 1, 2017
Jay owes money to the IRS and enlists Smitty, Kenny, and Mabel's help.
25	6	"Switcheroo"	Bentley Kyle Evans	Alex Kauvtskiy	August 8, 2017
Smitty and Mabel switch jobs for the day.
26	7	"The Hustle"	Bentley Kyle Evans	Jazmen Darnell Brown & Chazman T. Rodgers	August 15, 2017
Kenny tries to make a rapper. The shop's new ATM gets stolen. Sherlock Smitty is on the case for his lucky two-dollar bill.
27	8	"Pretty Things"	Bentley Kyle Evans	Bentley Kyle Evans & Alex Kauvtskiy	August 22, 2017
Feeling that he has been scammed, Smitty hires a lawyer.
28	9	"The Relationship Game"	Bentley Kyle Evans	Bentley Kyle Evans & Alex Kauvtskiy	August 29, 2017
The couples' relationships are tested in a quiz game.
29	10	"ExtravHAIRganza"	Bentley Kyle Evans	Stacey Evans Morgan	September 5, 2017
The barbershop and the beauty salon enter a contest for making hair growth formulas.
30	11	"Book. Club. Love."	Bentley Kyle Evans	Stacey Evans Morgan	September 12, 2017
Cheryl's book club gets out of hand with tons of secrecy.
31	12	"Feng Shui"	Bentley Kyle Evans	Jay Phillips	September 19, 2017
After getting into an argument with Cheryl, Percy starts working at the barbershop and makes things complicated.
32	13	"New Beginnings"	Bentley Kyle Evans	Bentley Kyle Evans & Alex Kauvtskiy	September 26, 2017
Jay is ready to take things to the next level with Cheryl but there is one problem, Kenny can't take the hint that it is time to move out.

=== Season 4 (2018) ===
No. overall	No. in season	Title	Directed by	Written by	Original release date
33	1	"Rules of Engagement"	Bentley Kyle Evans	Stacey Evans Morgan	July 2, 2018
34	2	"Mind Your Business"	Bentley Kyle Evans	Jazmen Darnell Brown, Chazman T. Rodgers	July 9, 2018
35	3	"Three's a Crowd"	Bentley Kyle Evans	Bentley Kyle Evans & Alex Kauvtskiy	July 16, 2018
36	4	"Looking Sharp"	Bentley Kyle Evans	Bentley Kyle Evans & Alex Kauvtskiy	July 23, 2018
37	5	"The Ring Bearer"	Bentley Kyle Evans	Bentley Kyle Evans & Alex Kauvtskiy	July 30, 2018
38	6	"Don't Knock The Hustle"	Bentley Kyle Evans	Bentley Kyle Evans & Alex Kauvtskiy	August 6, 2018
39	7	"Family Secrets"	Bentley Kyle Evans	Bentley Kyle Evans & Alex Kauvtskiy	August 13, 2018
40	8	"Checkin' In, Dozin' Off"	Bentley Kyle Evans	Bentley Kyle Evans & Alex Kauvtskiy	August 20, 2018
41	9	"Fed Up"	Bentley Kyle Evans	Patricia Cuffie-Jones	August 27, 2018
42	10	"The Life Saver"	Bentley Kyle Evans	RT Sketel	September 3, 2018
43	11	"May the Best Man Win"	Bentley Kyle Evans	Bentley Kyle Evans & Alex Kauvtskiy	September 10, 2018
44	12	"The Bachelor Party"	Bentley Kyle Evans	John Marshal Jones	September 17, 2018
45	13	"The Big Day"	Bentley Kyle Evans	Bentley Kyle Evans & Alex Kauvtskiy	September 24, 2018

=== Season 5 (2019) ===
No. overall	No. in season	Title	Directed by	Written by	Original release date
46	1	"The Honeymooners"	Bentley Kyle Evans	Unknown	July 15, 2019
Jay and Cheryl's honeymoon phase is cut short when Cheryl redecorates their condo. Elsewhere, Kenny and Smitty hang out for the weekend.
47	2	"Monster-In-Law"	Bentley Kyle Evans	Stacey Evans Morgan	July 15, 2019
Cheryl's mother comes for a visit. Kenny reunites with an old friend.
48	3	"Poker Face"	Unknown	Unknown	July 22, 2019
Jay, Kenny, and Smitty lose a poker game. Angelique becomes internet famous and Kenny struggles to deal with it.
49	4	"Too Sexy for My Sweats"	Bentley Evans Morgan	Stacey Evans Morgan	July 29, 2019
Jay can't deal with Cheryl's sleepwear. Percy gains a celebrity client.
50	5	"Dating Soulmates"	Unknown	Unknown	August 5, 2019
Jay and Cheryl think that they may have found the perfect couple. Percy gives Smitty a makeover.
51	6	"Used to Be My Homie"	Unknown	Unknown	August 12, 2019
Jay and Kenny both feel jealous when Smitty and Angelique's old friends come in town for a visit.
52	7	"Lucky Charmed"	Bentley Kyle Evans	Oren Williams	August 19, 2019
Jay unintentionally buys Cheryl a stolen necklace.
53	8	"Raging Bully"	Unknown	Unknown	August 26, 2019
Jay's old bully comes to town and is dating his sister. Smitty may be out of job when his barber license expires.
54	9	"Cyrano de Kenny"	Unknown	Unknown	September 2, 2019
Jay tries fix Kenny and Angelique's relationship, but only causes more harm in the process. Mabel's loyal customers are being stolen by a new trendy food truck.
55	10	"Slumdog Millionaire"	Unknown	Unknown	September 9, 2019
Jay must defend himself in court after a client slips and falls in the shop. Kenny and Smitty plan to fix things in their apartment building.
56	11	"America's Got Skillz, Part 1"	Bentley Kyle Evans	Kylee Evans	September 16, 2019
Kenny, Smitty, and Percy audience for a talent competition series. Thanks to a bad review, Mabel is losing business.
57	12	"America's Got Skillz, Part 2"	Unknown	Unknown	September 23, 2019
Smitty starts acting different when he advances on America's Got Skillz. Cheryl hosts a girls' night, with disastrous results.
58	13	"The Cold Shoulder"	Unknown	Unknown	September 30, 2019
A small argument cause a huge strain between Jay and Cheryl. Smitty tries to become a Goober drive.(Goober is an off-brand version of Uber)

=== Season 6 (2020) ===
No. overall	No. in season	Title	Directed by	Written by	Original release date
59	1	"Barbershop Through The Years"	Unknown	Unknown	April 1, 2020
60	2	"The Ole Bait and Switch"	Unknown	Unknown	April 8, 2020
61	3	"Colonoscareapy"	Unknown	Unknown	April 15, 2020
62	4	"Jokes on You"	Unknown	Unknown	April 29, 2020
63	5	"Guess Who's Trending"	Unknown	Unknown	May 6, 2020
64	6	"New Management"	Unknown	Unknown	May 13, 2020
65	7	"Sister Sister"	Unknown	Unknown	May 20, 2020
66	8	"Broken Bones"	Unknown	Unknown	May 27, 2020
67	9	"Second Chances"	Unknown	Unknown	June 3, 2020
68	10	"The Takeover"	Unknown	Unknown	June 10, 2020
69	11	"Just Friends"	Unknown	Unknown	June 17, 2020
70	12	"Secret Admirer"	Bentley Kyle Evans	Stacey Evans Morgan	June 24, 2020
71	13	"Priors & Engagements"	Unknown	Unknown	July 1, 2020

=== Season 7 ===
No. overall	No. in season	Title	Directed by	Written by	Original release date
72	1	"Pros & Cons"	Unknown	Unknown	August 26, 2020
73	2	"Tooth Treason"	Bentley Kyle Evans	Unknown	September 2, 2020
74	3	"Not In Kansas Anymore"	Unknown	Unknown	September 9, 2020
75	4	"Rock Le Cradle"	Unknown	Unknown	September 16, 2020
76	5	"Cooking That Kitchen"	Unknown	Unknown	September 23, 2020
77	6	"Big Bruh"	Bentley Kyle Evans	Stacey Evans Morgan	September 30, 2020
78	7	"Rollin' Stone"	Unknown	Unknown	October 7, 2020
79	8	"If You Wanna Make An Omlette"	Unknown	Unknown	October 14, 2020
80	9	"Game Fight Night"	Unknown	Unknown	October 21, 2020
81	10	"The Big Reveal"	Unknown	Unknown	October 28, 2020
82	11	"Vasect-Oh My!"	Unknown	Unknown	November 4, 2020
84	12	"Pappa Jay"	Unknown	Unknown	November 11, 2020
85	13	"Getting to I Do"	Unknown	Unknown	November 18, 2020
