= London Independent Producers =

British film production company

London Independent Producers was a British film production company. It was founded in 1951 by Sydney Box and William MacQuitty. Box had recently been head of production of Gainsborough Pictures, part of the Rank Organisation. After Gainsborough was closed down Box left Rank and chose to produce independently. Box's wife, the director Muriel Box, acted as a third partner.

In spite of the founder's ambitions to have greater independence from the big studios, the need to secure good distribution led to greater dependence on the major companies.

== Selected filmography ==
- The Happy Family (1952)
- Street Corner (1953)
- The Beachcomber (1954)
- Forbidden Cargo (1954)
- Above Us the Waves (1955)
- The Prisoner (1955)
- Accident (1967)
- The Man Outside (1967)
- Theatre of Death (1967)
- The Long Duel (1967)
- The Limbo Line (1968)
- Amsterdam Affair (1968)
- Taste of Excitement (1970)

== Bibliography ==
- Spicer, Andrew. Sydney Box. Manchester University Press, 2006.
