= C. E. T. Warren =

Charles Esme Thornton Warren
- Born: 11 January 1912; Croydon, Surrey, England, UK
- Died: 24 May 1988 (aged 76); Kent, England, UK
- Military career
- Allegiance: United Kingdom
- Branch: Royal Navy
- Rank: Lieutenant
- Conflicts: Second World War
- Awards: MBE

Lieutenant Charles Esme Thornton Warren MBE (1912–1988) was a bestselling British author, a Second World War Royal Navy submariner, and one of the first Allied 'human torpedo charioteers', practising methods of clandestine attack upon enemy harbours and ships.

== Biography ==
Born in Croydon on 11 January 1912, "Jim" Warren was educated at Bedford School. In 1931 he became the first ex-public schoolboy to join the Royal Navy as an ordinary stoker. He hoped to achieve a commission through the Selborne-Fisher scheme. He achieved extremely high marks in both the theoretical and practical examinations, but the engineer commander at the Leading Stokers School in Chatham Dockyard refused to grant him a commission. Instead he was offered a free choice of whichever ship he wanted and chose submarines. Between 1934 and 1936 he served aboard HMS Rover on the China Station, and then aboard HMS Otus and HMS Osiris. He served during the Second World War and, in 1940, he took part in an operation intended to block the Danube at the Iron Gates, on the border between Serbia and Romania, to prevent German access to oil from the Ploiești oil fields. The plan was discovered and aborted.

Warren then became a member of the naval liaison staff attached to No. 50 Commando based at Heraklion on Crete, raiding enemy outposts in the Dodecanese. During the evacuation of Greece, in 1941, he was Chief Stoker aboard the damaged HMS Rover as she was towed by the destroyer HMS Griffin to Alexandria. In 1942, he volunteered for the Special Submarine Flotilla, later known as the 12th Submarine Flotilla, which used two-man human torpedoes, chariots and midget submarines, to attack enemy targets, including the German battleship Tirpitz.

In 1943, Warren carried out the beach surveys of Sicily before the Allied landings and, in 1944, he was finally commissioned as a Sub-lieutenant, but was seriously injured when he lost control of a chariot and sank to a depth of 100 feet. In 1946 he was commissioned as a Lieutenant and retired from the Royal Navy.

Lieutenant Jim Warren was invested as a Member of the Order of the British Empire in 1945. He died in Kent on 24 May 1988, aged 76.

== Publications ==
Jim Warren wrote jointly with James Benson and their books included:

- Above Us the Waves (1953), about the exploits of the Special Submarine Flotilla, which became an international best seller and a major feature film.
- The Admiralty Regrets (1958), about the submarine HMS Thetis, which sank during sea trials on 1 June 1939 with the loss of ninety-nine lives.
- Will Not We Fear (1961), an account of the surrender of the submarine HMS Seal in 1940.

== Film adaptations ==
The 1955 British war film Above Us the Waves, starring John Mills, John Gregson and Donald Sinden, was based on Jim Warren's 1953 book of the same name.
