= Ken Lawson =

American actor and rapper (born 1976)

- Born: Kenneth Lawson; January 19, 1976 (age 50); West Covina, California, U.S.
- Other name: Ken L.
- Occupations: Actor, rapper
- Years active: 1996 – present

Kenneth Lawson (born January 19, 1976), better known as Ken L., is an American actor and rapper.

He is known for his role as Thaddeus "T" Tyrell Radcliffe, Jr. on the UPN comedy sitcom The Parkers.

== Early life ==
Ken Lawson performed in many talent shows when he was a young boy. Around 1996, he began to produce and write music.

== Career ==
Lawson's first acting role came when he portrayed Carl in the sitcom In the House. After that he was later cast in the role of "T" (Thaddeus Tyrell Radcliffe) on the UPN sitcom The Parkers, which is the spin-off series of Moesha. He had a recurring role in season 1 and then became a regular cast member for the remainder of the show, seasons 2 through 5. He appeared in 106 episodes.

After The Parkers ended in 2004, he took a break from acting and then began making appearances in small roles like appearing as an African-American aide in Malibu's Most Wanted, Steppin: The Movie as Mike, and a made-for-television film called Pimp 24/7 as Icey. Nowadays, Lawson can be seen on the Bounce TV sitcom In The Cut, where he reunites with his The Parkers co-star Dorien Wilson, as a series regular since the show's inception in 2015. In 2023, Lawson appeared as a minor recurring character playing Officer Driver in the BET soap drama The Oval.

== Filmography ==
=== Film ===
Year	Title	Role	Notes
1999	Flossin	Deebo	
2001	The Learning Curve	Beverly Hills Officer #2	
2003	Malibu's Most Wanted	African American Aide	
2005	Ganked	Cousin Jerome	
2007	Song of David	Winston	short film
2008	Massa Card	Ken	short film
2009	Steppin: The Movie	Mike	
2009	Pimp 24/7	Icey	TV movie
2010	5 Ways to Split Apart the Day	Weldon	short film
2011	I Was Her	Steve	short film, also producer
2015	Benjamin Troubles	Nelson	
2024	Lumina	George	
2024	The Stepdaughter 2	Brandon	
2025	Run	Roland	To be released

=== Television ===
Year	Title	Role	Notes
1996 - 1999	In the House	Carl	Recurring role
1997	Smart Guy	Tiko	Guest (1 episode)
1997	Chicago Hope	Nathan Jessup	Guest (1 episode)
1999 - 2004	The Parkers	Thaddeus Tyrell "T" Radcliffe	Main role
1999	Moesha	Thaddeus Tyrell "T" Radcliffe	Guest (1 episode)
2001	The Proud Family	Timothy Smythe	Voice cast (1 episode)
2011 -2013	Love That Girl!	DeMiracle	Guest (2 episodes)
2015 - 2021	In the Cut	Kenny Clark	Main role
2023–Present	The Oval	Officer Driver	Minor recurring role

== See also ==
- List of American actors
- List of hip hop musicians
- List of people from California
