= Taste of Excitement =

1970 British film by Don Sharp

- Spanish film poster
- Directed by: Don Sharp
- Screenplay by: Brian Carton; Don Sharp; Alec Coppel (uncredited)
- Based on: Waiting for a Tiger; 1965 novel by Ben Healey
- Produced by: George Willoughby
- Starring: Eva Renzi; David Buck; Peter Vaughan; Paul Hubschmid; Sophie Hardy; Kay Walsh; Francis Matthews; George Pravda; Peter Bowles
- Cinematography: Paul Beeson
- Edited by: Raymond Poulton
- Music by: Keith Mansfield
- Production companies: Trio Films; Group W Films
- Distributed by: London Independent Producers; Alliance International Film Distributors
- Release date: 16 November 1969
- Running time: 89 minutes
- Country: United Kingdom
- Language: English

Taste of Excitement, also known as Why Would Anyone Want to Kill a Nice Girl Like You?, is a 1969 British mystery thriller film directed by Don Sharp and starring Eva Renzi, David Buck and Peter Vaughan. It was written by Sharp and Brian Carton based on the 1965 novel Waiting for a Tiger by Ben Healey.

The film was a co production between Group W and Trio Films. It was shot during 1968 on location around Nice on the French Riviera, but not given a general release until 1970. It had an X certificate for "moderate sexualised nudity".

== Plot ==
A series of attempts are made on the life of a young woman, Jane Kerrell.

== Cast ==
- Eva Renzi as Jane Kerrell
- David Buck as Paul Hedley
- Peter Vaughan as Inspector Malling
- Paul Hubschmid as Hans Beiber
- Sophie Hardy as Michela
- Kay Walsh as Miss Barrow
- Francis Matthews as Mr Breese
- George Pravda as Dr Forla
- Peter Bowles as Alfredo Guardi
- Alan Rowe as police inspector
- Alan Barry as Mr Camot, French detective
- Tom Kempinski as French police officer
- Yves Brainville as hotel proprietor
- Catherine Berg as receptionist

== Original novel ==
Taste of Excitement was based on Brian Healey's novel Waiting for a Tiger (1965), the first of a series of thrillers about artist Paul Hedley (the next would be The Millstone Men, The Terrible Pictures, Murder without Crime, The Trouble with Penelope, Blanket of the Dark, and Last Ferry from the Lido).

Reviewing the book in the New York Times, Antony Boucher wrote "the action is incessant and well varied." The Los Angeles Times said it "suggests the Ambler touch." The Philadelphia Inquirer called it "clever, restrained, brightly sinister." "The story is a delight," wrote the San Francisco Examiner.

== Production ==
Sharp says he was approached to make the film by producer George Willoughby, who had been recommended to use the director by John Terry of the National Film Finance Corporation. Sharp says it was "rather a nice thriller" with the original title of The Girl in the Red Mini. The film was being made for television and theatrical release; Westinghouse – through its company, Group W – was providing American finance. It was shot in France in 1968. Sharp's commitment to the film meant he had to turn down an offer from Hammer Films to direct Vengeance of She.

Sharp said it had "quite a nice cast without any big names" but four days before shooting was to begin Westinghouse announced it had done a survey of what had been successful of television that revealed comedy-thrillers rated better than straight thrillers. Accordingly, the company sent over a writer, Alec Coppel, to turn the film into a comedy-thriller. Sharp knew Coppel from Australia before the war and felt "he'd done some good work" like I Killed the Count (1939) and The Gazebo (1959) but that was "some time back". Sharp says Coppel would rewrite "out of context... reams of stuff" which the director had to rewrite and cut the night before filming "getting it into the right shape... You wouldn't believe the chaos and confusion", said Sharp. The director says the roles played by Peter Bowles, David Buck and Francis Matthews in particular were greatly reduced.

However Sharp said he "got along very well" with producer George Willoughby and the other producers from Group W, who hired him to make a second film, The Violent Enemy (1969), which would ultimately be released before Taste of Excitement. (In between Sharp worked on a film version of Till Death Us Do Part but was fired.)

Peter Bowles wrote in his memoirs that he had clashed with Don Sharp while making an episode of The Avengers but three weeks later Sharp offered the actor a role in Taste of Excitement. Bowles loved making the film because of its location.

== Reception ==
The Monthly Film Bulletin wrote: "Standard mystery adventure which, apart from the opening sequence, rather surprisingly fails to make much of its Riviera setting. The title's promise of excitement is fulfilled only on the most conventional level, but though a little stale in appearance the film has enough twists and red herrings to keep it moving and the cast adequately meet the small demands made of them."
