= Dorien Wilson =

American actor (born 1963)

- Born: Dorien Leon Wilson; July 5, 1963 (age 62); Lompoc, California, U.S.
- Occupation: Actor
- Years active: 1991–present
- Known for: Eddie Charles - Dream On; Professor Stanley Oglevee – The Parkers; Jay Weaver – In the Cut
- Spouse: JoAnn Wilson (1986–?)
- Children: 2

Dorien Leon Wilson (born July 5, 1963) is an American actor known for his role as Professor Stanley Oglevee on the UPN sitcom The Parkers (the spin-off series of Moesha), which ran from 1999 to 2004, his recurring role as Terrence Winningham on the ABC/The WB sitcom Sister, Sister (from 1994 to 1996) and his supporting role as Eddie Charles on Dream On (from 1991 to 1996). Most recently, he has starred as Jay Weaver on the Bounce TV comedy sitcom In the Cut.

== Early life and education ==
Wilson was born on July 5, 1963, to his parents in Lompoc, California, and has two siblings, sister Savita Carothers and late brother, Jamont David Wilson, who died in 2015. Wilson developed an interest in acting while attending high school in Lompoc, California.

== Career ==
Wilson played the role of Professor Stanley Oglevee on the UPN sitcom The Parkers and as talk-show host Eddie Charles on HBO's series Dream On. He had a recurring role as Terrence on Sister, Sister. He also played Warrington Steele on The Steve Harvey Show and co-starred alongside Sherman Hemsley on the short-lived sitcom Goode Behavior.

He has appeared mostly in television roles but appeared in a few film roles as well. He co-starred in House Party 4: Down to the Last Minute in 2001 and had a bit part as a doctor in the 2004 film You Got Served.

Wilson appeared in Disney Channel's series That's So Raven as "Mad Money Mitch" with the Mighty Megamix, "Mad Miguel at Mid-night" on the Spanish Station, and "Mad Mountain Mitch" with the Good Ol' Country Hits. He appeared on The Fresh Prince of Bel-Air as Juggles the clown strapped with a bomb and holding Judge Banks hostage; he appeared on the sitcom Martin as a theatre producer; and he made a couple of appearances as a pastor on the sitcom Living Single. He also had an appearance in Tyler Perry's House of Payne as Cassi Davis' college love-interest.

Dorien was also Chandler's boss on the hit TV Show Friends. In the 1980s Dorien was a resident Actor of CTC—California Theatre Center—in Sunnyvale, CA. He was also an Acting Conservatory Teacher at CTC. After recognizing her former teacher—Dorien Wilson—on Friends & various other shows, one of his CTC students from the 1980s, Anita Fortner Jones, who played his daughter—Fezziwig Sister, among other roles—for 2 Seasons in the stage play of Charles Dickens' "A Christmas Carol," created the Dorien Wilson Fan Club. He has also appeared in a KFC commercial for boneless chicken.

== Personal life ==
In 1986, Wilson was married to JoAnn Wilson.

== Filmography ==
=== Film ===
Year	Title	Role	Notes
2001	House Party 4: Down to the Last Minute	Jon Harris, Sr.	Video
2001	Beethoven's 4th	Marlowe	Video
2002	Clover Bend	Traxel	
2003	Ghost Dog: A Detective Tail	Lt. L.L. Deeks	TV movie
2003	Quigley	Security Guard Pressle	
2004	You Got Served	Doctor	
2004	Gas	Councilman Tripp	
2007	King of Sorrow	Sprats	
2008	Peaches	Sams	Video
2009	Steppin: The Movie	James Brooks	
2011	Shadow Hills	Willie	TV movie
2013	Boots	Ben	TV movie
2013	Pastor Shirley	Pastor Leeland	
2013	At Mamu's Feet	Tony	
2015	Stalked by My Neighbor	Detective Franklin	TV movie
2015	The Grace of Jake	Reverend Lovely	
2016	A Weekend with the Family	John Clancy	
2016	LAPD African Cops	Mr. Barber	
2017	Chi Nu Legacy	Coach Benjamin	
2017	Conflict of Interest	Samson	
2018	Never Heard	Monty	
2018	Going Black	Maurice	Short
2018	When Uber Goes Wrong 2	Dorien	Short
2019	Looking in the Mirror	Dr. Lewis	
2019	I Got the Hook Up 2	Captain Evans	
2019	His, Hers & the Truth	Mr. Smith	
2020	Steppin' Back to Love	Edward	TV movie
2020	Justice on Trial: The Movie 20/20	Professor Boomer Stevens	
2021	Fruits of the Heart	Hurbert Humperdinck	
2021	Welcome Matt	Harold	

=== Television ===
Year	Title	Role	Notes
1991	Home Improvement	Workman No. 2	Episode: "Bubble, Bubble, Toil and Trouble"
1991–96	Dream On	Eddie Charles	Main cast: season 2-6
1992	Sibs	Joe Riddle	Recurring cast
1993	Murphy Brown	Eric	Episode: "To Have and Have Not"
1994	Seinfeld	Alec	Episode: "The Raincoats"
1994–96	Sister, Sister	Terrence	Recurring cast: season 2-3
1995	Cleghorne!	Jeff	Recurring role
1995	Campus Cops	Percy	Episode: "3,001"
1995	Friends	Mr. Douglas	Episode: "The One with Two Parts"
1996	The Fresh Prince of Bel-Air	Juggles	Episode: "I Clownius"
1996	Martin	Kelly Garrett	Episode: "Homeo & Juliet"
1996	Friends	Mr. Kogen	Episode: "The One with the Chicken Pox"
1996	Mr. & Mrs. Smith	Dr. Lance McQuade	Episode: "The Coma Episode"
1996–97	Living Single	Rev. Leslie Taylor	Guest: season 2, recurring cast: season 3
1996–97	Goode Behavior	Franklin Goode	Main cast
1997	Jungle Cubs	Yarren (voice)	Episode: "runks for the Memories"
1997	Moesha	Dave Norris	Episode: "Prom Fright"
1997–98	The Steve Harvey Show	Warrington Steele	Recurring cast: season 2
1998	Diagnosis: Murder	Justin Blair	Episode: "Murder x 4"
1998	Boy Meets World	Store Manager	Episode: "Santa's Little Helpers"
1999	Moesha	Professor Stanley Oglevee	Episode: "It Takes Two"
1999–04	The Parkers	Professor Stanley Oglevee	Main cast
2000	Seven Days	Rev. Carl Flood	Episode: "Mr. Donovan's Neighborhood"
2001	The Proud Family	Dave Daniels (voice)	Episode: "Teacher's Pet"
2004	Missing	Landon Warfield	Episode: "Deep Cover"
2006	That's So Raven	Mitch	Episode: "The Ice Girl Cometh"
2008	Tyler Perry's House of Payne	Andrew	Episode: “Reunited and… It Don’t Feel So Good”
2013	Everyday Lies	Dorien	Episode: "How We Roll"
2014	The Millers	Doctor	Episode: "Miller's Mind"
2015–16	Bella and the Bulldogs	Coach Russell	Recurring cast
2015–21	In the Cut	Jay Weaver	Main cast
2016–17	Tough Love	Dr. Singleton	Recurring cast
2017	Beauty and the Baller	Mario Shaw	Recurring cast
2018	Dumped	Ray	Episode: "Tata- Vega"
2018	The Rich & the Ruthless	Pastor Bell	Main cast: season 2
2020	Cherish the Day	Johnny Fisher	Recurring cast
2020	Howard High	Mr. Thomas	TV mini series
2020	Casting The Net	Pastor	Episode: "The Magnificent Three"
2020	Church Folks	Frank Hart	Main cast
2020	Grey's Anatomy	Clifford Ndugu	Episode: "You'll Never Walk Alone"
2021	Just Roll with It	Mr. Yarburry	Episode: "Before the Beginning"
