= Gino McKoy =

Trinidadian-Canadian film director and screenwriter

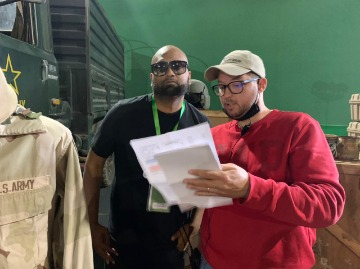
- Gino McKoy on the set of Lumina
- Born: Gino Justin Hudson McKoy; December 28, 1980 (age 45)
- Occupations: Film director, film producer, screenwriter, singer, songwriter, record producer
- Years active: 2006–present
- Musical career
- Origin: Toronto, Canada
- Genres: R&B; Indie pop
- Labels: BMG; Goldove

Gino Justin Hudson McKoy (born 1980) is a Trinidadian-born Canadian film director, screenwriter, singer, and songwriter. He is known for directing Little Mizz Innocent (2015), Lumina (2024), and Revolutionary (2025).

== Early life and education ==
Gino McKoy was born in Trinidad to Hudson and Lynda McKoy. He was raised in Canada and grew up surrounded by music and business. In his childhood, he became interested in science fiction.

== Career ==
=== Music ===
In 2006, McKoy released "Soca Warriors Anthem" for 2006 FIFA World Cup which partly references the chorus of "Road to Italy," a 1989 hit soca song by SuperBlue, associated with the Strike Squad team. Another song, "West Indies Forever", which was produced by him in 2004, was played at the inaugural ceremony of 2007 Cricket World Cup. During his music career, McKoy was affiliated with Bertelsmann Music Group.

In 2010, McKoy released his debut album, Step Forward, which was produced by David Kershenbaum after original collaborator Nick Blagona fell ill.

In 2019, McKoy released the single "Everything to Me", which was co-written by Hudson McKoy and featured on the soundtrack of his sci-fi horror comedy film Lumina.

=== Film ===
In 2015, McKoy wrote the script for Little Mizz Innocent, a film starring Olga Kurylenko. The film follows a UN interpreter entangled in a conflict between the FBI and a criminal organization.

In 2020, McKoy was credited with building a 50,000-square-foot soundstage in Morocco, considered the largest interior film set constructed in Africa.

In 2024, McKoy wrote, directed, and produced the science fiction film Lumina. He also handled the visual effects and performed several songs featured in the soundtrack. In March 2023, the film was acquired by Porter+Craig Film and Media.

McKoy is also collaborating with Michael Sloan to produce a new film, Spidersweb, set to begin shooting in the summer of the following year. The film will be filmed in Morocco.

Alongside his music and film work, McKoy ventured into fashion by co-founding Lydgio Fashions with his mother.

== Discography ==
- "West Indies Forever" (2004)
- "Soca Warriors Anthem" (2006)
- "Runaway"
- "Sensy Girl"
- "Everything to me"

== Filmography ==
- Little Mizz Innocent (2015)
- Lumina (2024)
- Revolutionary (2025)
