= Into Thy Hands =

Play by Jonathan Holmes

Into Thy Hands is a 2011 play by Jonathan Holmes on the life of John Donne and in particular his actions during 1611 and his relationships with those involved in translating the King James Version. Its title quotes Psalm 31 and Luke 23:46, from the sayings of Jesus on the cross.

It premiered at Wilton's Music Hall in London from 31 May to 2 July 2011 in a production directed by Holmes himself, to mark the 400th anniversary of the Authorized King James Version, with Donne played by Zubin Varla.

== Premiere cast ==
- John Donne – Zubin Varla
- Donne's wife Anne – Jess Murphy
- Lancelot Andrewes – Nicholas Rowe
- Henry Wotton and James I – Bob Cryer
- Countess of Bedford (Donne's patron) – Stephanie Langton
- Lady Danvers (wife of John Danvers and patron of Donne) – Helen Masters
- John Layfield – Stephen Fewell
