= Josie Rourke =

English theatre and film director

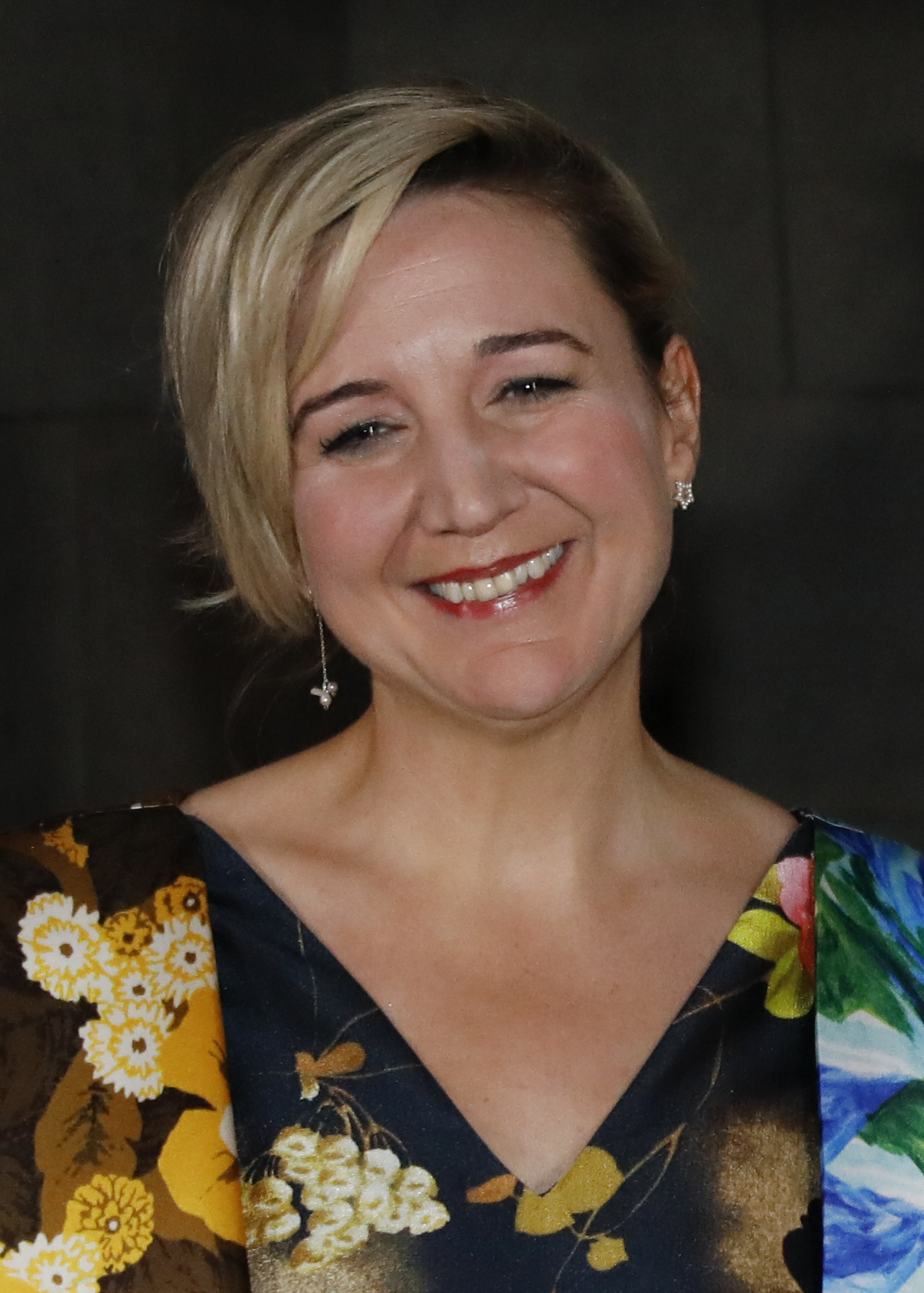
- Rourke at the Mary Queen of Scots premiere in 2019
- Born: Salford, Greater Manchester, England
- Education: New Hall, Cambridge
- Occupations: Theatre director; film director
- Years active: 1998–present
- Notable work: Mary Queen of Scots (2018)

Josie Rourke is an English theatre and film director. She is a vice-president of the London Library, and was the artistic director of the Donmar Warehouse theatre from 2012 to 2019. In 2018, she made her feature film debut with the Academy Award- and BAFTA-nominated historical drama Mary Queen of Scots, starring Saoirse Ronan and Margot Robbie.

== Early life and education ==
Josie Rourke was born in Salford, Greater Manchester.

She attended St Mary's RC Primary School, Swinton, St Gilbert's RC Primary School, Winton, St Patrick's RC Secondary School, Eccles, and Eccles College of Further Education.

Rourke was the first person in the history of her school to attend Cambridge University, where she studied English at New Hall, now Murray Edwards College. She began directing for theatre at Cambridge and, amongst other credits, was the first woman ever to direct the Footlights Pantomime, which was co-written by Footlights president and vice president Richard Ayoade and John Oliver.

== Career ==
=== Training ===
Upon graduating from Cambridge in 1998, Rourke worked for Cambridge Arts Theatre, co-ordinating the BT National Connections project around East Anglia. She then moved to London, where she worked nights as a secretary for a mergers and acquisitions bank, pursuing theatre projects during the days, including assisting Laurie Sansom on a production of J.B. Priestley's Dangerous Corner (1999) at Watford Palace Theatre.

After nine months of living and working in London, she was appointed resident assistant director at the Donmar Warehouse. Sam Mendes was then the artistic director. Over her year-long traineeship, she assisted Michael Grandage on Peter Nichols' Passion Play (2000) and Merrily We Roll Along (2000–2001), Nicholas Hytner on Orpheus Descending (2000), starring Helen Mirren, Sam Mendes on Nick Whitby's To the Green Fields Beyond (2000) and Phyllida Lloyd on David Mamet's Boston Marriage (2001), starring Zoë Wanamaker.

Following her twelve months at the Donmar, Sam Mendes asked her to direct Frame 312 (2002) on its stage, and Michael Grandage invited Rourke to Sheffield to direct Kick for Touch (2002) as part of the Peter Gill Festival at Sheffield Theatres. While preparing those productions, Rourke assisted Peter Gill on his own play, The York Realist (2001), and John Osborne's Luther (2001) on the Olivier stage of the National Theatre.

=== Early directing career ===
For the next five years, Rourke freelanced at a number of theatres, while being resident at the Royal Court in London and Associate Director of Sheffield Theatres.

While resident at the Royal Court Theatre, under Artistic Director Ian Rickson, she programmed readings, developed new work and directed Crazyblackmuthafuckin'self (2003) in the Theatre Upstairs at the Royal Court and Loyal Women (2003) in the Theatre Downstairs. Her productions for Sheffield Theatres during this time were on the Lyceum, Crucible and Studio stages and included Much Ado About Nothing (2005) and Willis Hall's The Long and the Short and the Tall (2006). Her production of Steve Waters' play World Music (2003) transferred from Sheffield to the Donmar stage. During this period, Rourke was also the UK tour director of Eve Ensler's The Vagina Monologues (2003).

She also directed for the Royal Shakespeare Company in the 2005 Gunpowder Season, Believe What You Will by Philip Massinger and, as part of the 2006 Complete Works Festival, King John by William Shakespeare, starring Richard McCabe, Joseph Millson, and Tamsin Greig. She returned to the Donmar to direct a production of David Mamet's The Cryptogram (2006), which starred Kim Cattrall and Douglas Henshall.

=== Artistic directorship ===
==== Bush Theatre (2007–2011) ====
In 2007, Rourke was appointed artistic director of the Bush Theatre, one of the country's key venues for new plays and playwrights. During her time at The Bush, she programmed the first plays and early work of, amongst other writers: James Graham, Nancy Harris, Lucy Kirkwood, Nick Payne, Penelope Skinner, Jack Thorne, Steve Waters, Anthony Weigh and Tom Wells.

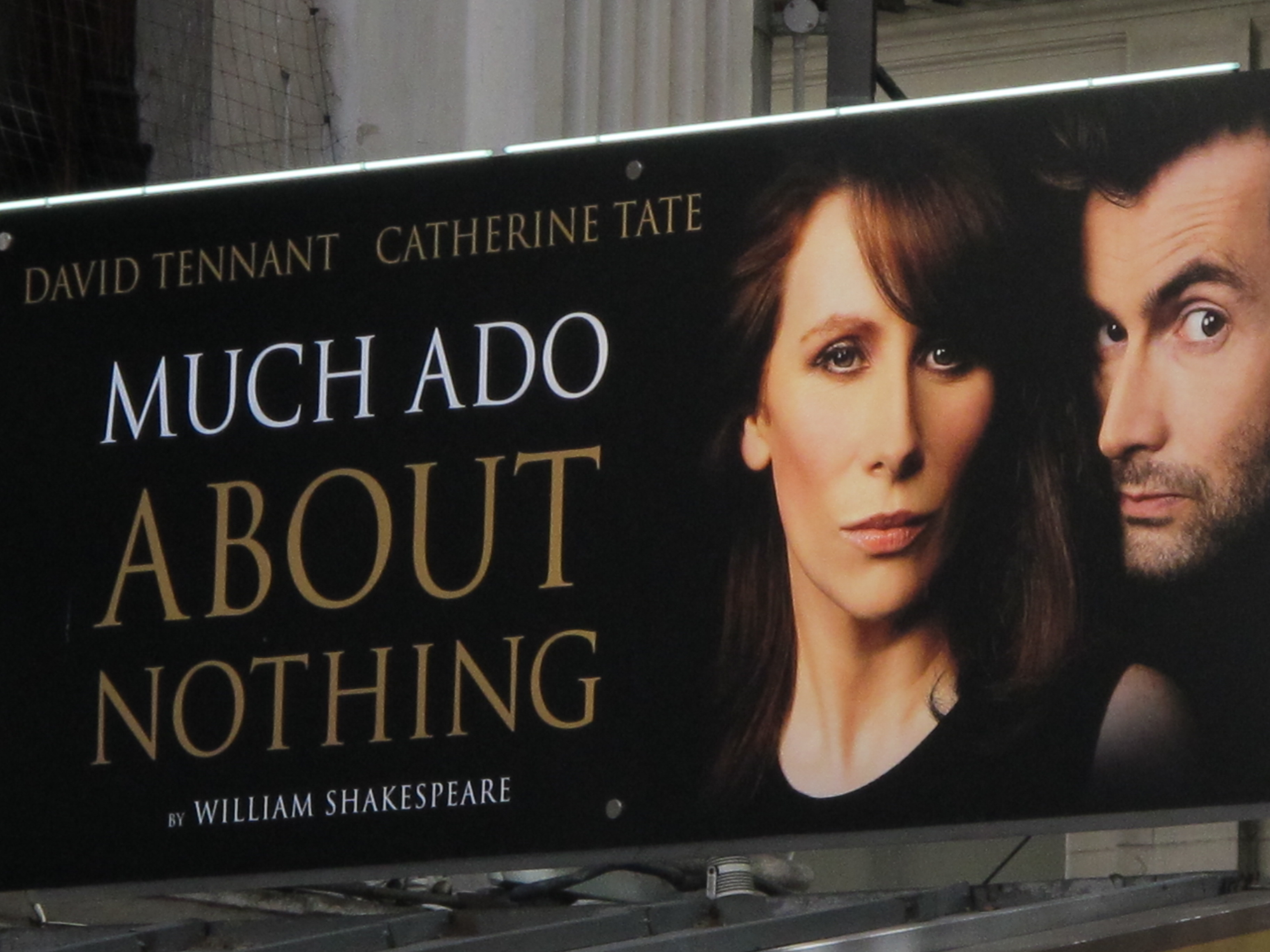
Poster for the 2011 production of Much Ado About Nothing, directed by Rourke

Shortly after she was appointed, the Bush Theatre was the target of a proposed cut in funding by Arts Council England. Rourke made a Freedom of Information Act request which established that the proposed cut had been made using flawed evidence and data. The Arts Council reinstated the theatre's funding but gave Rourke three years in which to find a new home for the Bush Theatre. In 2011, the Bush Theatre opened in new premises in a former library building, winning Theatre of the Year.

The new home for The Bush opened with Sixty-Six Books (2011), a 24-hour performance cycle with 66 writers and 144 actors that Rourke co-directed with a dozen of her peers. The cycle went on to be performed overnight in Westminster Abbey.

During her time at The Bush, Rourke continued to work as a freelance director. Her projects included Twelfth Night (2009) and The Taming of The Shrew (2010) for Chicago Shakespeare Theater, Men Should Weep (2010–2011) by Ena Lamont Stewart at the National Theatre and Much Ado About Nothing (2011) for Sonia Friedman Productions at the Wyndham's Theatre, starring David Tennant and Catherine Tate, the onstage reunion of which won the WhatsOnStage Award for the Theatre Event of the Year.

==== Donmar Warehouse (2012–2019) ====
In 2011, Rourke was appointed Artistic Director of the Donmar Warehouse, the first woman to hold the role and the first female theatre director to be appointed the artistic director of a major London theatre.

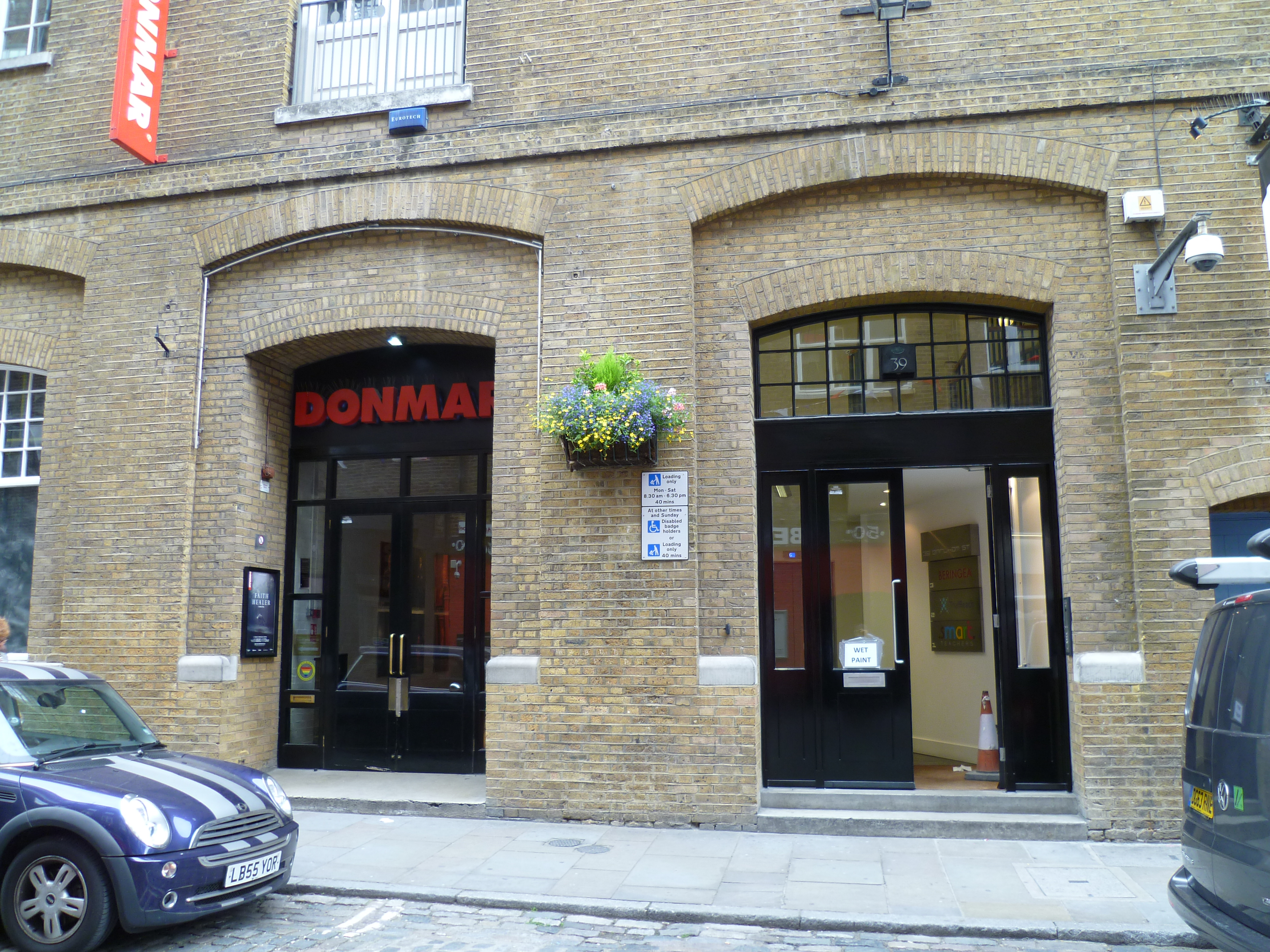
Donmar Warehouse in London

As artistic director, she was responsible for programming the work of, amongst other directors: Phyllida Lloyd, who directed her all-female Shakespeare Trilogy at the Donmar; Kwame Kwei-Armah; Lyndsey Turner, whose celebrated revivals of Brian Friel's work have been a significant part of the Donmar's programme; Polly Findlay; Blanche McIntyre; John Crowley; Joe Wright and Robert Hastie.

Her first production at the Donmar was The Recruiting Officer (2012), beginning a working relationship with actor and writer Mark Gatiss, who would go on to star in Coriolanus (also starring Tom Hiddleston) and The Vote at the Donmar. Other notable productions at the Donmar include: Saint Joan (2017) with Gemma Arterton; Berenice (2012) with Anne-Marie Duff; Conor McPherson's The Weir (2013); which transferred to the West-End; Nick Payne's new play Elegy, starring Zoë Wanamaker, Barbara Flynn and Nina Sosanya; the innovative and campaigning Privacy (2014) by James Graham; The Machine (2013) by Matt Charman; the musical City of Angels (2014) by Cy Coleman, Larry Gelbart and David Zippel, which won an Olivier Award; Les Liaisons Dangereuses (2015) with Janet McTeer, Elaine Cassidy and Dominic West at the Donmar and McTeer, Birgitte Hjort Sørensen and Liev Schreiber on Broadway; and also the BAFTA-nominated play for theatre and television, The Vote (2015), which was broadcast live onto television on the night of the general election. The broadcast starred Judi Dench, Mark Gatiss, Catherine Tate and Nina Sosanya and garnered the highest annual viewing figures for the channel in that slot.

From the Donmar, The Weir transferred to the West End, The Machine transferred from the Manchester International Festival to the Park Avenue Armory in New York, Les Liaisons Dangereuses to Broadway and Privacy was reconceived in a US version at The Public Theater with Daniel Radcliffe playing the leading role.

A number of Rourke's productions, including Coriolanus, Les Liaisons Dangereuses and Saint Joan, were broadcast in cinemas in the UK and internationally as part of the National Theatre Live programme.

=== Film and television ===
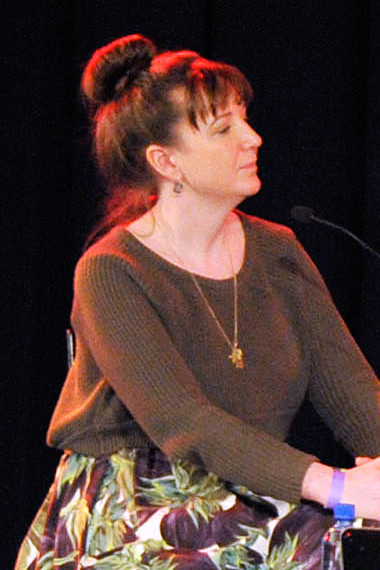
Rourke in 2014

Rourke made her film debut with Working Title's Mary Queen of Scots. The film starred Saoirse Ronan as Mary, Queen of Scots and Margot Robbie as Elizabeth I. It premiered on 15 November 2018 at the AFI Fest and later received three nominations at the 72nd British Academy Film Awards, and two nominations, for Best Costume Design and Best Makeup and Hairstyling, at the 91st Academy Awards.

In 2019, Rourke was attached to direct The Nan Movie (then titled This Nan's Life), based on Catherine Tate's popular television character. However, a significant portion of the film was shot without Rourke's involvement, resulting in the film being released with no director credited and Rourke listed as an executive producer. The film received universally negative reviews upon release, obtaining a 0% approval rating on reviewing site Rotten Tomatoes.

After leaving the Donmar Warehouse, Rourke revived her Olivier Award-winning production of City of Angels at the Garrick Theatre in London, in a production produced by Nica Burns. The cast included Theo James and Vanessa Williams, alongside original company members Rosalie Craig and Hadley Fraser. The production was scheduled to open in March 2020 but was cancelled two days before its opening night due to the COVID-19 pandemic and the closure of UK theatres.

During the 2020 lockdown, she directed the episode "Her Big Chance" of the BBC reboot of Alan Bennett's classic 1980s monologues, Talking Heads, starring Jodie Comer in the lead role. In summer 2021, she directed and co-wrote (with James Graham) the star-studded short film Rhythm of Life, encouraging people to get COVID-19 vaccines. It featured the song "The Rhythm of Life" from the 1966 classic musical, Sweet Charity, and starred Jim Broadbent, Derek Jacobi, David Walliams, Asa Butterfield, Colin Salmon, Don Warrington, Nicola Roberts, Russel Tovey and West End dancers.

Following the COVID-19 shutdown of UK theatres, Rourke returned to stage directing with a series of productions in London, including As You Like It (2022) at @sohoplace, the first new West End theatre to open in 50 years. The production featured Rose Ayling-Ellis, Leah Harvey and Martha Plimpton, and incorporated British Sign Language and live music. She subsequently directed Sam Steiner’s Lemons Lemons Lemons Lemons Lemons (2023) at the Harold Pinter Theatre, and Dancing at Lughnasa (2023) by Brian Friel at the National Theatre.

In 2025, Rourke directed the premiere of Porn Play by Sophia Chetin-Leuner at the Royal Court Theatre, starring Ambika Mod. The production explored themes of addiction, sexuality and digital culture, and was developed from research into the effects of online pornography.

Rourke is directing the feature film adaptation of Edith Wharton’s novel The Custom of the Country, produced by StudioCanal. The film stars Sydney Sweeney as Undine Spragg, who also serves as a producer on the project. The ensemble cast includes Leo Woodall, Josh Finan, Louis Garrel, Matthew Goode, Rose Leslie, Martha Plimpton, Irène Jacob, Hugh Dancy, Dominic West and Miranda Richardson.

The project marks Rourke’s return to feature filmmaking following Mary Queen of Scots (2018), and represents a large-scale period adaptation of Wharton’s 1913 novel, which charts the social ascent of the ambitious Undine Spragg within early 20th-century American and European high society. Development of the film was announced in 2026, with Rourke attached as director and adapting the material for the screen.

Principal photography began in 2026, with production taking place in Portugal, where locations were used to double for New York and European settings of the period. The film has been described as a major international co-production and forms part of StudioCanal’s slate of literary adaptations.

=== Other work ===
From 2012 to 2018, Rourke served as a non-executive director of public service broadcaster Channel 4. Since November 2019, Rourke has been a vice-president of the London Library, having a particular focus on developing the Library's support for emerging playwrights as part of its wider Emerging Writers Program.

== Filmography ==
Film

- Mary Queen of Scots (2018)
- The Custom of the Country (TBA)

Television

| Year | Title | Note |
|---|---|---|
| 2020 | Alan Bennett's Talking Heads | Episode "Her Big Chance" |

Short film

- Rhythm of Life (2021) (Also writer)

== Theatre productions ==
Productions directed by Josie Rourke
| Play | Author | Theatre | Opening date | Notes |
|---|---|---|---|---|
| Dancing at Lughnasa | Brian Friel | National Theatre | 6 April 2023 | |
| Lemons Lemons Lemons Lemons Lemons | Sam Steiner | Harold Pinter Theatre | 18 January 2023 | |
| As You Like It | William Shakespeare | @sohoplace, London | 6 December 2022 | |
| Measure for Measure | William Shakespeare | Donmar Warehouse | 28 September 2018 | |
| Saint Joan | George Bernard Shaw | Donmar Warehouse | 19 December 2016 | Broadcast live with National Theatre Live on 16 February 2017 |
| Les Liaisons dangereuses | Pierre Choderlos de Laclos, adapted by Christopher Hampton | Donmar Warehouse | 17 December 2015 | Broadcast live with National Theatre Live on 28 January 2016 |
| The Vote | James Graham | Donmar Warehouse | 27 April 2015 | Broadcast live on More4 on election night |
| Privacy | James Graham | Donmar Warehouse | 22 April 2014 | |
| Coriolanus | William Shakespeare | Donmar Warehouse | 6 December 2013 | |
| The Machine | Matt Charman | Manchester International Festival | 4 July 2013 | |
| The Weir | Conor McPherson | Donmar Warehouse | 18 April 2013 | |
| Berenice | Jean Racine, in a new version by Alan Hollinghurst | Donmar Warehouse | 27 September 2012 | |
| The Physicists | Friedrich Dürrenmatt, in a new version by Jack Thorne | Donmar Warehouse | 31 May 2012 | |
| The Recruiting Officer | George Farquhar | Donmar Warehouse | 9 February 2012 | |
| Sixty-Six Books | various | Bush Theatre | 10 October 2011 | |
| Much Ado About Nothing | William Shakespeare | Wyndham's Theatre | 1 June 2011 | |
| The 24 Hour Plays | | Old Vic Theatre | 21 November 2010 | |
| Men Should Weep | Ena Lamont Stewart | National Theatre | 18 October 2010 | |
| Here | Eve Ensler | Riverside Studios | 1 July 2010 | Broadcast live on British television in conjunction with Sky Arts |
| ...like a fishbone... | Anthony Weigh | Bush Theatre | 7 June 2010 | |
| The Taming of the Shrew | William Shakespeare | Chicago Shakespeare Theater | 7 April 2010 | The production included new scenes written by dramatist Neil LaBute |
| If There Is I Haven't Found It Yet | Nick Payne | Bush Theatre | 17 October 2009 | |
| Apologia | Alexi Kaye Campbell | Bush Theatre | 17 June 2009 | |
| Twelfth Night | William Shakespeare | Chicago Shakespeare Theater | 29 March 2009 | |
| 2,000 Feet Away | Anthony Weigh | Bush Theatre | 11 June 2008 | |
| Tinderbox | Lucy Kirkwood | Bush Theatre | 23 April 2008 | |
| How To Curse | Ian McHugh | Bush Theatre | 10 October 2007 | |
| A Year and a Day | Christina Reid | Stephen Joseph Theatre, Scarborough | 17 November 2006 | Part of National Theatre Connections |
| The Cryptogram | David Mamet | Donmar Warehouse | 12 October 2006 | |
| The Life and Death of King John | William Shakespeare | Swan Theatre, Stratford-upon-Avon | 27 July 2006 | |
| Flight without End | Joseph Roth, adapted by Steve Waters | London Academy of Music and Dramatic Art | 1 May 2006 | |
| The Long and the Short and the Tall | Willis Hall | Lyceum Theatre, Sheffield | 23 February 2006 | |
| Much Ado About Nothing | William Shakespeare | Crucible Theatre, Sheffield | 21 September 2005 | |
| Believe What You Will | Philip Massinger | Swan Theatre, Stratford-upon-Avon | 18 May 2005 | Later the People's Theatre, Newcastle upon Tyne and Trafalgar Studios, London |
| The Unthinkable | Steve Waters | Crucible Studio Theatre, Sheffield | 26 October 2004 | |
| Butterfly Fingers | Fraser Grace | The Junction Theatre, Cambridge | 1 July 2004 | |
| Changed So Much I Don't Know You | Steve Waters | The Junction Theatre, Cambridge | 1 July 2004 | |
| Dead Hand | Anthony Neilson | Old Vic Theatre | 6 June 2004 | Part of The 24 Hour Plays |
| My Dad's A Birdman | David Almond | Young Vic | 4 December 2003 | |
| Crazyblackmuthfuckin'self | DeObia Oparei | Royal Court Theatre | 29 November 2003 | |
| Loyal Women | Gary Mitchell | Royal Court Theatre | 11 November 2003 | |
| The Herd | Sandesh Kulkarni | Royal Court Theatre | 1 August 2003 | |
| World Music | Steve Waters | Crucible Theatre, Sheffield | 28 May 2003 | Later Donmar Warehouse |
| Children's Day | Marvin Blair | Royal Court Theatre | 27 February 2003 | A 15-minute monologue, written by a man serving a life sentence in a UK prison. It was developed as part of Voices from Within, a writing project at HMP Grendon in conjunction with the Royal Court Young Writers Programme, and played after the evening's performance of Rona Munro's Iron in the Jerwood Theatre downstairs at the Royal Court. |
| The Vagina Monologues | Eve Ensler | UK tour | 2003 | UK tour director, 2003 tour |
| Romeo and Juliet | William Shakespeare | Liverpool Playhouse | 3 October 2002 | |
| Kick for Touch | Peter Gill | Crucible Studio Theatre, Sheffield | 23 May 2002 | |
| Frame 312 | Keith Reddin | Donmar Warehouse | 14 March 2002 | World premiere. |
| The Wrong Side of the Rainbow | | Donmar Warehouse | 28 January 2001 | A dramatic piece based on a Carlton TV television show of the same name. Stories from the streets about London's homeless were dramatised for the stage |
| Orpheus Descending | Tennessee Williams | Donmar Warehouse | 27 June 2000 | |
| Passion Play | Peter Nichols | Donmar Warehouse | 18 April 2000 | |
