= Elegy (play) =

2016 play by Nick Payne

- Written by: Nick Payne
- Original language: English
- Subject: Controversial medical treatment for brain disorders
- Genre: Drama

Premiere
- Date premiered: 21 April 2016
- Place premiered: Donmar Warehouse

Elegy is a 2016 British play by Nick Payne.

Elegy had its world premiere production at the Donmar Warehouse, London with an official opening night on 27 April 2016, following previews from 21 April. Its limited run concluded on 18 June 2016. Josie Rourke directed the production, which starred Zoë Wanamaker as Lorna, Barbara Flynn as Carrie and Nina Sosanya as Miriam.

The play was nominated for the 2017 Laurence Olivier Award for Best New Play.

== Plot ==
In the near future, radical and unprecedented advances in medical science lead to the possibility of augmenting and extending life. Lorna has had surgery to eliminate a brain disease. However, she loses her memory and does not recognize her partner Carrie when they meet after 20 years. In flashbacks, the two are seen during their relationship. Lorna's doctor Miriam is conflicted about the treatment.

== Critical reception ==
The Guardian reviewer said: "Payne probes the moral consequences of scientific progress. At its most moving, the play poses the question of whether love, like religious faith, is a conscious state of mind that can be eradicated: much of the play’s anguish derives from Lorna’s post-op indifference to the devoted Carrie. But, while the play airs big issues such as whether medical advance undercuts the notion of fixed identity, it works because we care deeply about the people."

The Independent reviewer concluded with: "As always with Payne, the structure feels musical – an impression amplified here with repeated extracts from the elegiac poetry of Douglas Dunn and Christopher Reid and by the pointed symbolism of the design. In a glass case, there's a dead, lightning-riven oak tree that's periodically engulfed by fog. Never resorting to sentimentality or melodrama, this is an emotionally gruelling but richly rewarding 75 minutes."
