= Nick Payne =

British playwright and screenwriter (born 1984)

- Payne in 2026
- Born: 1984 (age 41–42)
- Occupations: Playwright, screenwriter

Nick Payne (born 1984) is a British playwright and screenwriter. Known for his work on the West End and Broadway stages, as well as on the screen, he has received nominations for a Laurence Olivier Award and a Tony Award.

Payne studied at the University of York and the Royal Central School of Speech and Drama before graduating from the Royal Court Young Writer's Program. Whilst working in the National Theatre Bookshop, he wrote his first play If There Is I Haven't Found It Yet, which premièred in 2009. It was followed by Wanderlust in 2010. He made his Broadway debut with Constellations (2015). For his play Elegy (2016) he received a Laurence Olivier Award for Best New Play nomination. Payne returned to Broadway with Sea Wall/A Life (2019) at the Hudson Theatre.

He created and wrote the BBC One series Wanderlust (2018) and wrote the screenplay for The Sense of an Ending (2016). He co-wrote the romantic drama The Last Letter From Your Lover (2021).

== Life and career ==
=== Early years and education ===
Payne studied at the University of York and subsequently at the Central School of Speech and Drama. He is also a graduate of the Royal Court Young Writer's Program. Nick was/is a member of the Northern Writing Squad, a project funded by the Arts Council in the North of England that supports emerging young writers.

=== Career ===
In 2008 Payne worked at the bookshop of the National Theatre. His first play, If There Is I Haven't Found It Yet, opened at the Bush Theatre in October 2009 and received a positive response from critics at the Evening Standard and the Financial Times. It won the George Devine Award. In September 2012 it was staged at New York's Laura Pels Theatre, starring Jake Gyllenhaal.

Payne's second play, Wanderlust, opened in September 2010, directed by Simon Godwin, at the Royal Court Theatre upstairs and also garnered excellent reviews. In November, Payne was shortlisted for the Evening Standard's Most Promising Playwright Award, but lost out to Anya Reiss. He took part in the Bush Theatre's 2011 project Sixty Six Books, for which he wrote a piece based upon a book of the King James Bible.

Constellations opened at Royal Court Theatre on 13 January 2012. Directed by Michael Longhurst and starring Rafe Spall and Sally Hawkins, it explores love, friendship and the notion of free will against the backdrop of quantum physics. It was extremely well received, with Charles Spencer in the Daily Telegraph commenting that "Nick Payne's drama lasts just over an hour but packs in more than most shows manage in three times that length. It is playful, intelligent and bursting with ideas, but also achieves a powerful undertow of emotion", while Paul Taylor in the Independent wrote that "one would be hard put to begin to do justice to the dazzling way it creates it own [sic] rules, while at the same time being wise enough not to jettison the old rule book either". It transferred to the Duke of York's Theatre in November 2012. That month it won the Evening Standard Theatre Award for Best Play. In January 2013 Payne revealed that a film adaptation was under way. This plan was later shelved.

In August 2013 his play The Same Deep Water As Me opened at the Donmar Warehouse, with a cast including Nigel Lindsay, Daniel Mays and Marc Wootton. In January 2014 Blurred Lines, a piece he devised with the director Carrie Cracknell, opened at the National Theatre's Shed. In 2014, two episodes of The Secrets which were written by Payne were broadcast on BBC One.

Incognito was a co-production between Live Theatre, nabokov, HighTide Festival Theatre and in association with The North Wall in spring 2014, which previewed at Live Theatre in April 2014, before going to HighTide Festival and The North Wall, Oxford. It returned to Live Theatre in May and then had a sell-out run at The Bush Theatre, London. Incognito was produced off-Broadway (in New York) by the Manhattan Theatre Club with support from the Alfred P. Sloan Foundation at New York's City Center in 2016. The play starred Charlie Cox, Heather Lind, Morgan Spector, and Geneva Carr and was directed by Doug Hughes.

The American premiere of Constellations opened on Broadway in January 2015 at Manhattan Theatre Club's Samuel J. Friedman Theatre, starring Academy Award nominee Jake Gyllenhaal and Ruth Wilson. Constellations reunited Gyllenhaal with Payne and director Michael Longhurst, who were also making their Broadway debuts with the production. The three had previously collaborated on the American premiere of If There Is I Haven't Found It Yet. The play was next mounted in 2016 at Washington DC's Studio Theatre, starring Lily Balatincz and Tom Patterson and directed by Studio Theatre Artistic Director David Muse. The production was nominated for six Helen Hayes Awards, with Balatincz winning the Helen Hayes Award for Best Actress in a Play and Patterson winning the Helen Hayes Award for Best Actor in a Play. In November 2016, Constellations opened at Canadian Stage in Toronto, under the direction of Peter Hinton-Davis.

A Life ran off-Broadway from February 2019 to March 2019 and transferred to Broadway at the Hudson Theatre in July 2019. The play ran with Sea Wall and starred Jake Gyllenhaal, directed by Carrie Cracknell. The plays were nominated for the 2020 Tony Award for Best Play.

In 2023, A24 acquired the rights to his romantic drama film We Live in Time starring Florence Pugh and Andrew Garfield.

== Works ==
=== Film ===
Year	Title	Role	Notes
2016	The Sense of an Ending	Screenwriter	BBC Films
2021	The Last Letter from Your Lover	Screenwriter	Netflix film
2024	We Live in Time	Screenwriter	A24 film

=== Television ===
Year	Title	Role	Notes
2014	The Secrets	Writer	2 episodes
2016	The Crown	Additional material	2 episodes
2018	Wanderlust	Writer	6 episodes

=== Theatre ===
Year	Title	Venue
2006	Flourless	reading at the Soho Theatre
2007	Lay Down Your Cross	reading at the Royal Court Theatre
2008	Switzerland	Hightide Theatre Festival
2009	If There Is I Haven't Found It Yet	Bush Theatre
2009	Wanderlust	Royal Court Theatre
2009	Starling	reading Royal Court Young Writers Festival
2010	The Lost Mariner	Royal Court
2010	Interior	The Gate Theatre
2011	One Day When We Were Young	Paines Plough & Sheffield Theatres
2011	Sixty Six Books	Bush Theatre
2012	If There Is I Haven't Found It Yet	Laura Pels Theatre
2012	Constellations	Royal Court Theatre
2013	The Same Deep Water As Me	Donmar Warehouse
2014	Incognito	Hightide Festival and Bush Theatre
2014	The Art of Dying	Royal Court Theatre
2014	Symphony (with Ella Hickson and Tom Wells)	Soho Theatre
2015	Constellations	Samuel J. Friedman Theatre
2016	Elegy	Donmar Warehouse
2017	Incognito	The Sandra Feinstein-Gamm Theatre
2019	Sea Wall/A Life	Hudson Theatre
2025	The Unbelievers	Royal Court Theatre

== Awards and nominations ==
Year	Association	Category	Project	Result
2017	Laurence Olivier Award	Best New Play	Elegy	Nominated
2020	Tony Award	Best Play	Sea Wall/A Life	Nominated
2020	Drama League Award	Outstanding Production	Constellations	Nominated

== See also ==
- List of British playwrights since 1950
