= 2,000 Feet Away =

Play by Anthony Weigh

2,000 Feet Away is a play by British playwright Anthony Weigh. The play is a portrait of small-town life in the Midwest. It is set primarily in Eldon, Iowa, which provided the setting for Grant Wood's famous painting American Gothic. The opening and closing scenes are set in the Art Institute of Chicago where the painting is now preserved. The title of the play alludes to a state law preventing sex offenders from living within 2,000 feet (610 m) of any place where children may gather.

The play premiered in Sydney, Australia and opened in London at the Bush Theatre during the 2008 summer season. The director of the Bush production was Josie Rourke, while the main character of the Deputy Sheriff was played by Joseph Fiennes, better known for his lead role in the film Shakespeare in Love. 2,000 Feet Away opened to generally positive reviews in the London press.

== External reviews ==
- Review by Michael Billington in the Guardian
