= The Contingency Plan =

Plays written by Steve Waters

- Book cover art
- Written by: Steve Waters
- Subject: Climate change
- Genre: Apocalyptic fiction

Premiere
- Date: 22 April 2009
- Place: Bush Theatre, London

The Contingency Plan is the overall title of a pair of plays by the British playwright Steve Waters that opened at the Bush Theatre on 22 April 2009. The two full-length plays are On the Beach and Resilience. They are both set in the United Kingdom in the near future. Both involve the same couple, Will Paxton and Sarika Chatterjee. Paxton is a scientist who has returned from research in Antarctica with a new understanding of glacial melting due to climate change and the corresponding possibilities of a rise in sea levels and of coastal flooding. Michael Billington wrote of the pair of plays that their "flaws pale beside Waters' massive achievement which is to have made the most important issue of our times into engrossing theatre."

In the original performances Will was played by Geoffrey Streatfeild and Sarika by Stephanie Street. On the Beach, which takes its name from the 1974 song by Neil Young, mainly involves Will's relationship with his father Robin (played by Robin Soans). Robin had unexpectedly retired from his own promising career as an Antarctic glaciologist shortly before Will's birth, and moved his family to an isolated house above a coastal salt marsh in Norfolk. Will has returned home to introduce Sarika to his parents, and to tell his father the painful news that he is leaving research to enter government service. In Resilience, Will and Sarika (a career civil servant) are jockeying for influence in a new Tory government with Colin Jenks (played by Soans). Jenks is a former collaborator of Will's father who has become an important scientific advisor to Chris Casson, the Minister for Climate Change, and to Tessa Fortnum, the Minister for Resilience. The second acts of both plays occur on an evening when weather threatens massive coastal flooding. In the first play, Robin and his wife Jenny must decide whether to evacuate. In the second, the two Ministers are in conflict about whether to order mass evacuations, and are receiving conflicting advice from Will and Colin Jenks.

The Contingency Plan was published in 2009. The play was shortlisted for the John Whiting Award in 2010. Since the original production, staged readings of The Contingency Plan have been performed in the United Kingdom, the United States, and Australia. An adaptation of the play was broadcast in the United Kingdom on BBC Radio 3 in December, 2009.
