= Lancelot Andrewes =

English bishop and scholar (1555–1626)

- Bishop of Winchester
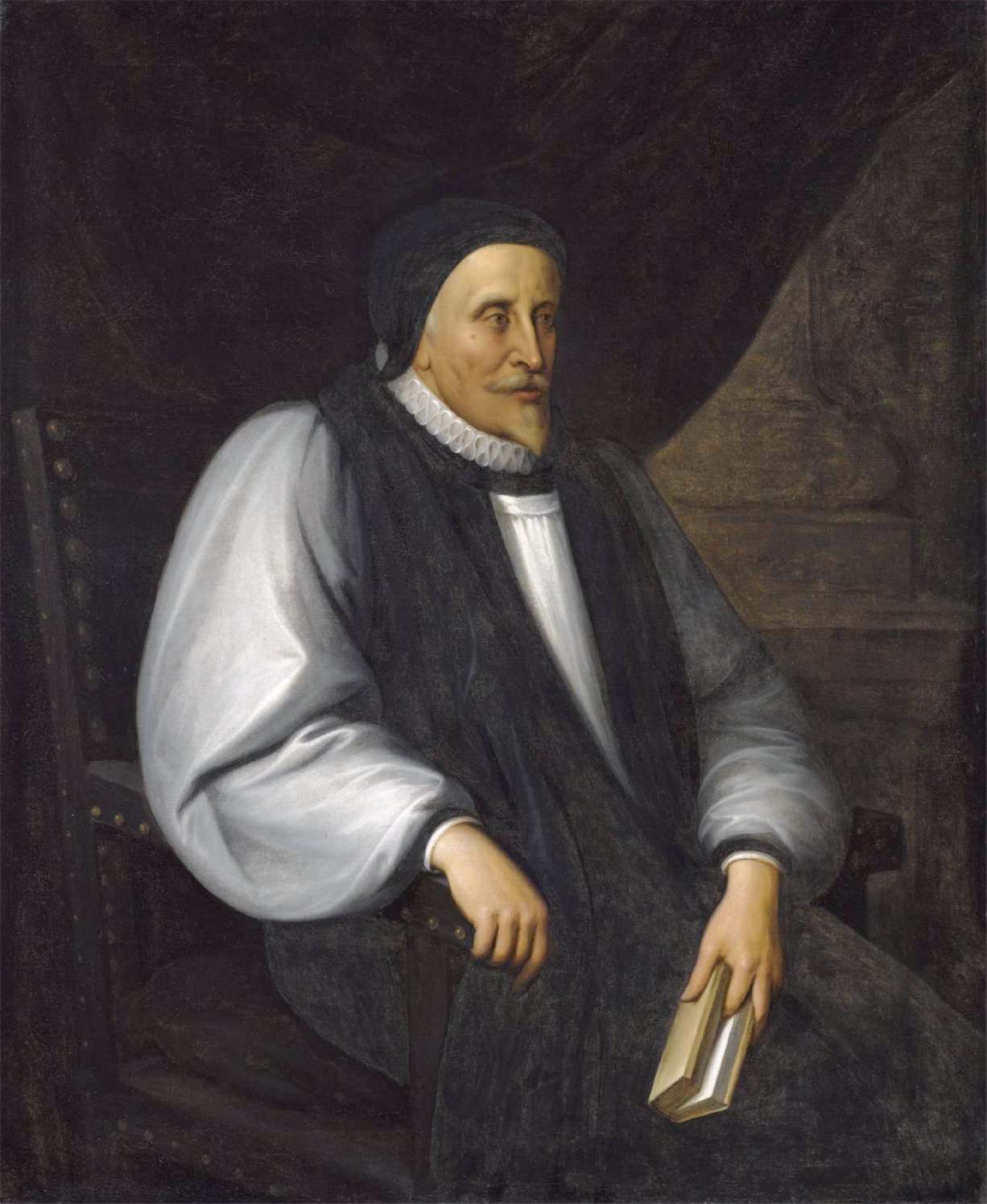
- "Bishop Andrews", c. 1660
- Church: Church of England
- Diocese: Winchester
- In office: 1619–1626
- Predecessor: James Montague
- Successor: Richard Neile
- Other posts: Dean of the Chapel Royal (1618–1626); Bishop of Ely (1609–1619); Lord Almoner (1605–1619); Bishop of Chichester (1605–1609); Dean of Westminster (1601–1605)

Orders
- Ordination: c. 1579 (deacon); 11 June 1580 (priest) by William Chaderton
- Consecration: 3 November 1605 by Richard Bancroft

Personal details
- Born: 1555 All Hallows-by-the-Tower, City of London, England
- Died: 25 September 1626 (aged 71) Southwark, Surrey, England
- Denomination: Anglican
- Residence: Winchester House, Southwark (at death)
- Parents: Thomas Andrewes (father)
- Occupation: Preacher, translator
- Education: Pembroke Hall, Cambridge

Lancelot Andrewes
- Venerated in: Anglican Communion
- Feast: 25 September (Church of England); 26 September (ECUSA, ACNA)

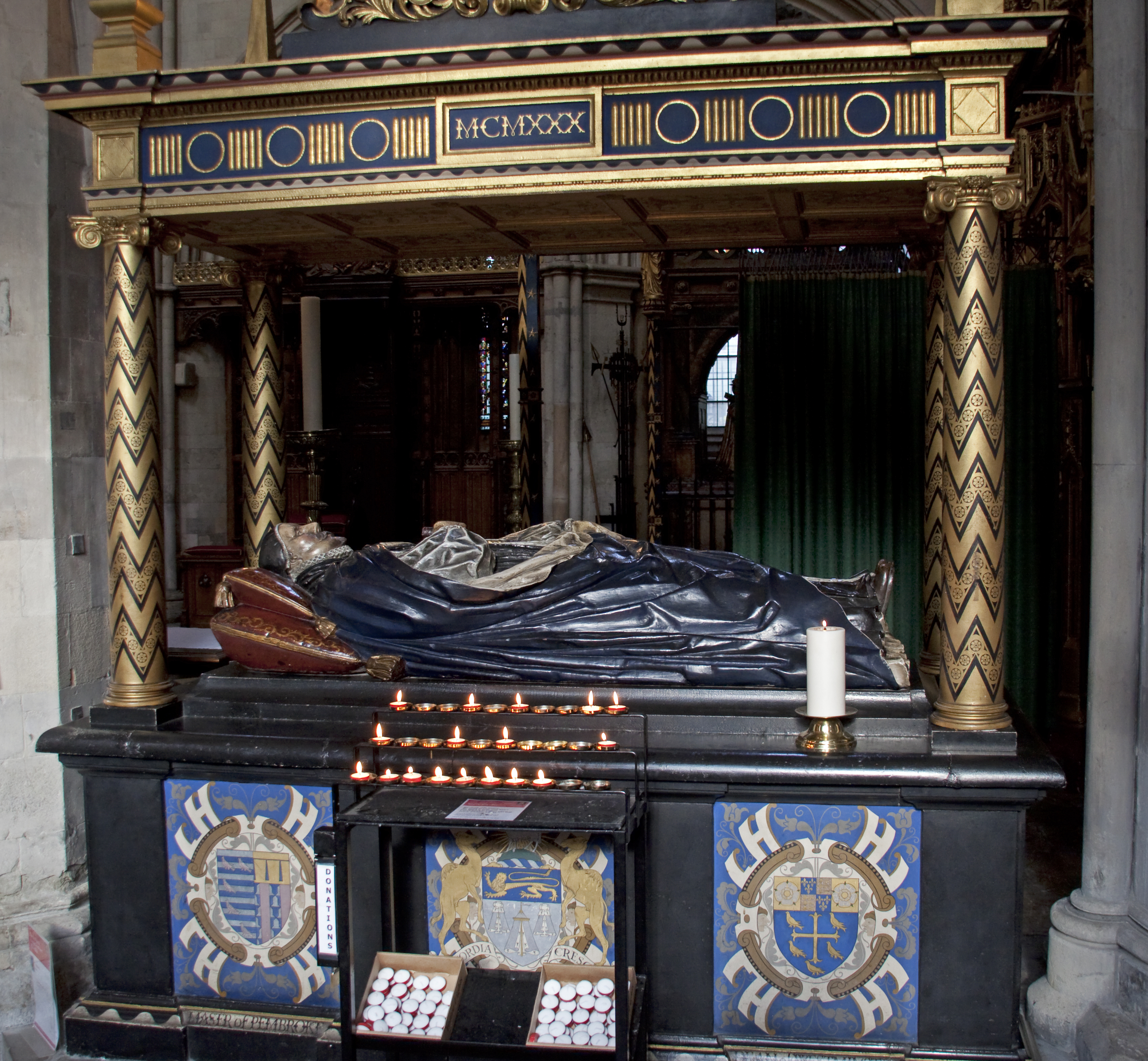
Restored monument with effigy of Lancelot Andrewes in Southwark Cathedral

Lancelot Andrewes (1555 – 25 September 1626) was an English bishop and scholar, who held high positions in the Church of England during the reigns of Elizabeth I and James I. During the latter's reign, Andrewes served successively as Bishop of Chichester, of Ely, and of Winchester and oversaw the translation of the King James Version of the Bible (or Authorized Version). In the Church of England he is commemorated on 25 September with a lesser festival.

== Early life, education and ordination ==
Andrewes was born in 1555 near All Hallows, Barking, by the Tower of London, of an ancient Suffolk family later domiciled at Chichester Hall, at Rawreth in Essex; his father, Thomas, was master of Trinity House. Andrewes attended the Cooper's free school in Ratcliff in the parish of Stepney and then the Merchant Taylors' School under Richard Mulcaster. In 1571 he entered Pembroke Hall, Cambridge, and graduated with a Bachelor of Arts degree, proceeding to a Master of Arts degree in 1578. His academic reputation spread so quickly that on the foundation in 1571 of Jesus College, Oxford he was named in the charter as one of the founding scholars "without his privity" (Isaacson, 1650); his connection with the college seems to have been purely notional, however. In 1576 he was elected fellow of Pembroke College; on 11 June 1580 he was ordained a priest by William Chaderton, Bishop of Chester, and in 1581 was incorporated Master of Arts (MA) at Oxford. As catechist at his college he read lectures on the Decalogue (published in 1630), which aroused great interest.

Once a year he would spend a month with his parents and, during this vacation, he would find a master from whom he would learn a language of which he had no previous knowledge. In this way, after a few years, he acquired most of the modern languages of Europe.

Andrewes was the elder brother of the scholar and cleric Roger Andrewes, who also served as a translator for the King James Version of the Bible.

== During Elizabeth's reign ==
In 1588, following a period as chaplain to Henry Hastings, 3rd Earl of Huntingdon, Lord President of the Council in the North, he became vicar of St Giles, Cripplegate, in the City of London, where he delivered striking sermons on the temptation in the wilderness and the Lord's Prayer. In a sermon (during Easter week) on 10 April 1588, he stoutly vindicated the Reformed character of the Church of England against the claims of Roman Catholicism and adduced John Calvin as a new writer, with lavish praise and affection.

Yet, Andrewes was certainly no Calvinist. It has been said that he developed a proto-Arminian soteriology while at Cambridge and that he maintained this non-Calvinist theology throughout his life. He made it a point to refuse to repeat the common Calvinist slogans of his time. During the first half of the seventeenth century, he argued that Calvinism was incompatible with civil government, preaching, and ministry. Throughout his sermons, he unashamedly criticized Calvinist doctrine and practice. He has been referred to as an avant-garde conformist, which is understood as an implicitly proto-Arminian precursor to Laudianism and explicit English-Arminianism. He outright decried the translation and Calvinistic notes in the Geneva translation of the Bible. He taught that God condemned Cain for his own freely chosen sin and he denied that God unconditionally predestined any to salvation or that he unconditionally condemned anyone. He argued for soteriological synergism, using Lot's wife as a picture that one's salvation is not secure post-conversion apart from an ongoing and freely chosen cooperation with God's saving grace. John Overall and Andrewes were more sympathetic to the Remonstrants than the Calvinists at the time of the Synod of Dort. Andrewes, out of fear, denied his support for the Remonstrants when letters sent to him from that party were intercepted. He was not on friendly terms with the delegates to the synod and he made it clear that he did not support the results. He and the Remonstrants attempted to use the ecclesiological similarities between the Contra-Remonstrants and the Puritans to persuade James I not to involve himself in the Synod of Dort or to support the Remonstrant cause if he did.

Through the influence of Francis Walsingham, Andrewes was appointed prebendary of St Pancras in St Paul's Cathedral, in 1589, and subsequently became master of his own college of Pembroke, as well as a chaplain to John Whitgift, Archbishop of Canterbury. From 1589 to 1609 he was prebendary of Southwell. On 4 March 1590, as a chaplain of Elizabeth I, he preached before her an outspoken sermon and, in October that year, gave his introductory lecture at St Paul's, undertaking to comment on the first four chapters of the Book of Genesis. These were later compiled as The Orphan Lectures (1657).

Andrewes liked to move among the people, yet found time to join a society of antiquaries, of which Walter Raleigh, Philip Sidney, Burghley, Arundel, the Herberts, Saville, John Stow, and William Camden were members. Elizabeth I had not advanced him further on account of his opposition to the alienation of ecclesiastical revenues. In 1598 he declined the bishoprics of Ely and Salisbury, because of the conditions attached. On 23 November 1600, he preached at Whitehall a controversial sermon on justification. In July 1601 he was appointed Dean of Westminster and gave much attention to the school there.

When plague struck in 1603 he retreated to Chiswick to teach the boys of Westminster School, where he preached a plague sermon on 21 August arguing in favour of leaving London under such circumstances. His argument rested on the Old Testament's commands to avoid exposing oneself to contagion, to avoid contact with lepers, etc. Andrewes said the plague was caused by "inventions" like "new meats in diet" and "new fashions in apparel" that had roused the wrath of God. He condemns changes in Christian tradition that "our fathers never knew of".

== During the reign of James I ==
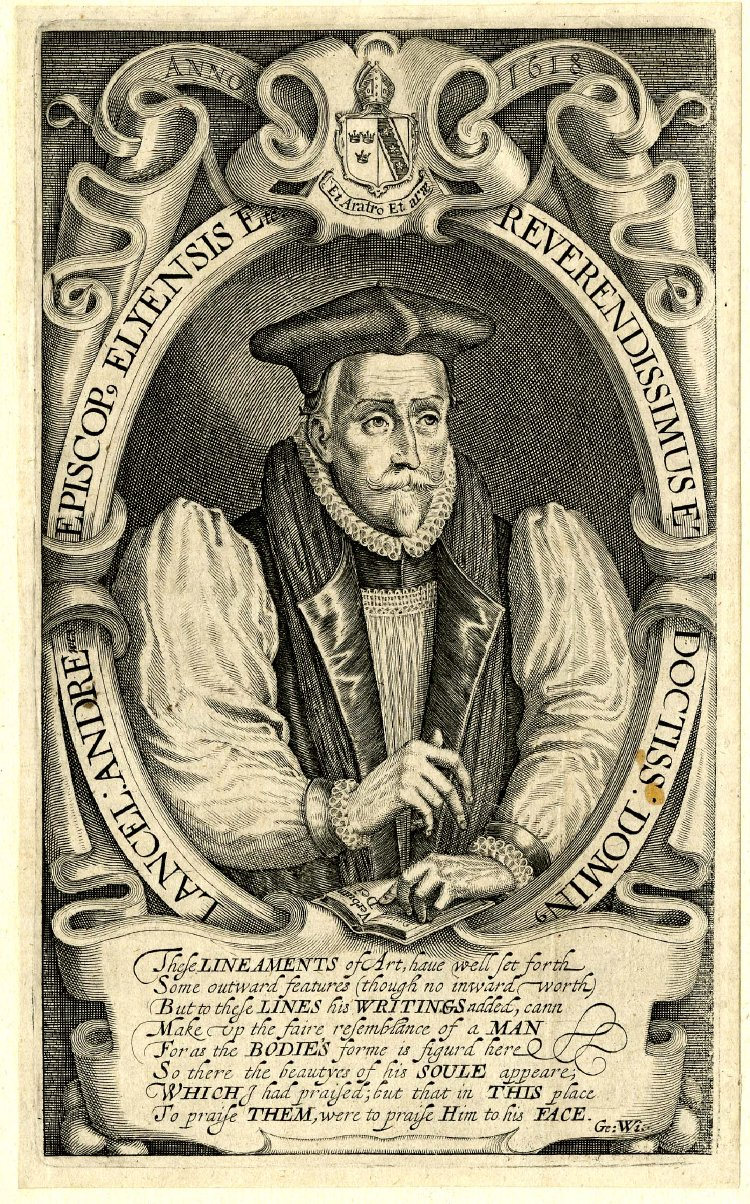
Portrait of Andrewes by Simon de Passe, engraving

On the accession of James I, Andrewes rose into great favour. He assisted at the coronation of James I and Anne, and in 1604 took part in the Hampton Court Conference.

Andrewes's name is the first on the list of divines appointed to compile the Authorized Version of the Bible, which was commissioned in 1604 and published in 1611. He headed the "First Westminster Company" which took charge of the first books of the Old Testament (Genesis to 2 Kings). He acted, furthermore, as a sort of general editor for the project as well.

On 31 October 1605 his election as Bishop of Chichester was confirmed; he was consecrated a bishop on 3 November, installed at Chichester Cathedral on 18 November and made Lord High Almoner (until 1619). Following the discovery of the Gunpowder Plot, Andrewes was asked to prepare a sermon to be presented to the king in 1606 (Sermons Preached upon the V of November, in Lancelot Andrewes, XCVI Sermons, 3rd. Edition (London, 1635) pp. 889, 890, 900–1008 ). In this sermon Andrewes justified the need to commemorate the deliverance and defined the nature of celebrations. This sermon became the foundation of celebrations which continue 400 years later. In 1609 he published Tortura Torti, a learned work which grew out of the Gunpowder Plot controversy and was written in answer to Bellarmine's Matthaeus Tortus, which attacked James I's book on the oath of allegiance. After moving to Ely (his election to that see was confirmed on 22 September), he again controverted Bellarmine in the Responsio ad Apologiam.

In 1617 he accompanied James I to Scotland with a view to persuading the Scots that Episcopacy was preferable to Presbyterianism. He was made dean of the Chapel Royal and translated (by the confirmation of his election to that see in February 1619) to Winchester, a diocese that he administered with great success.

Following his death in 1626 in Winchester Palace, the bishop's residence in Southwark, he was mourned alike by leaders in church and state, and buried in St Saviour's Church (now Southwark Cathedral, then in the Diocese of Winchester). He was buried in a small chapel at the east end. After the destruction of the Bishop's Chapel in 1830, his tomb was moved to a new position, immediately behind the high altar. His monument is by Gerard Janssen; the canopy was restored by Arthur Blomfield with colouring by Ninian Comper.

== Legacy ==
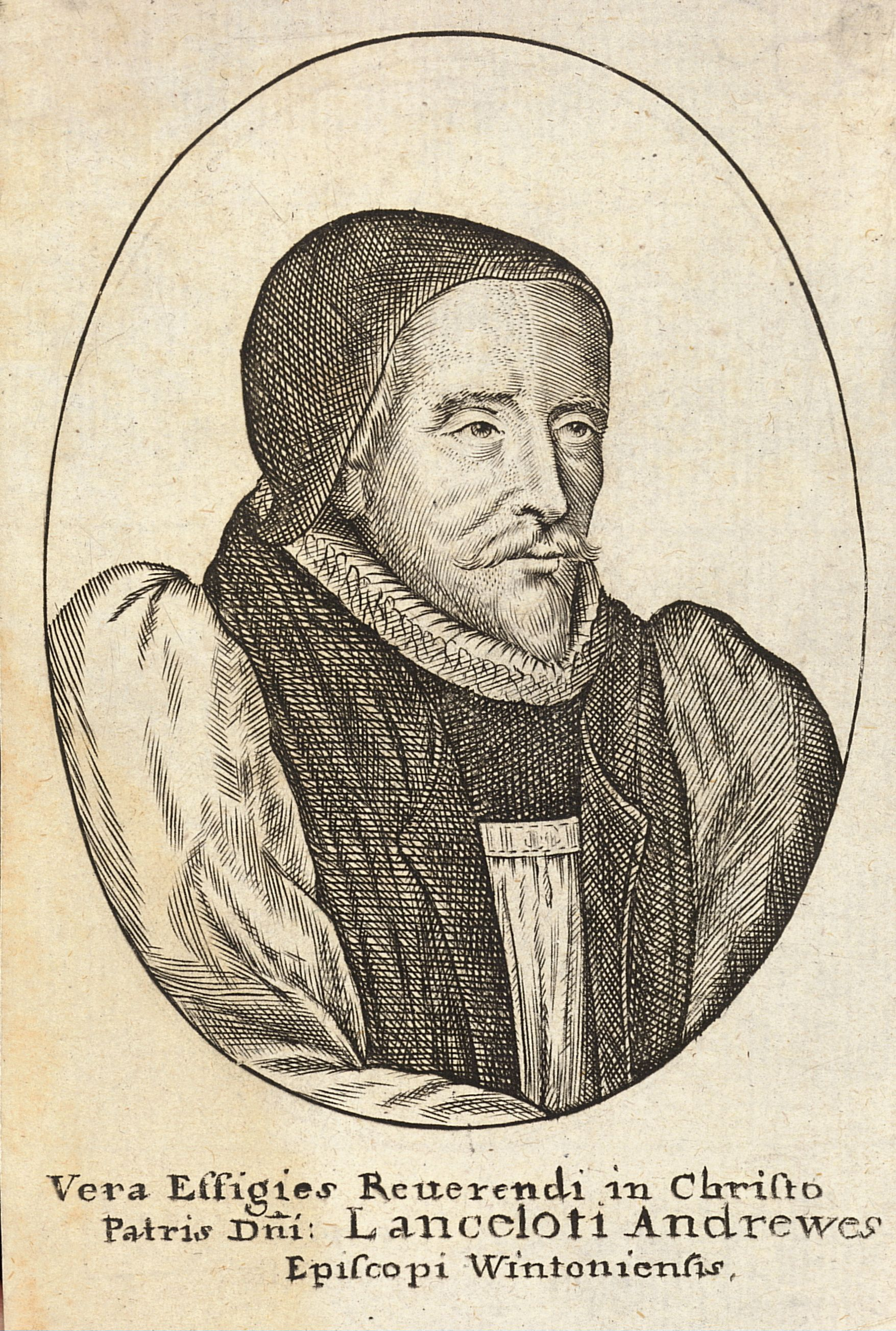
Portrait of Andrewes by Hollar

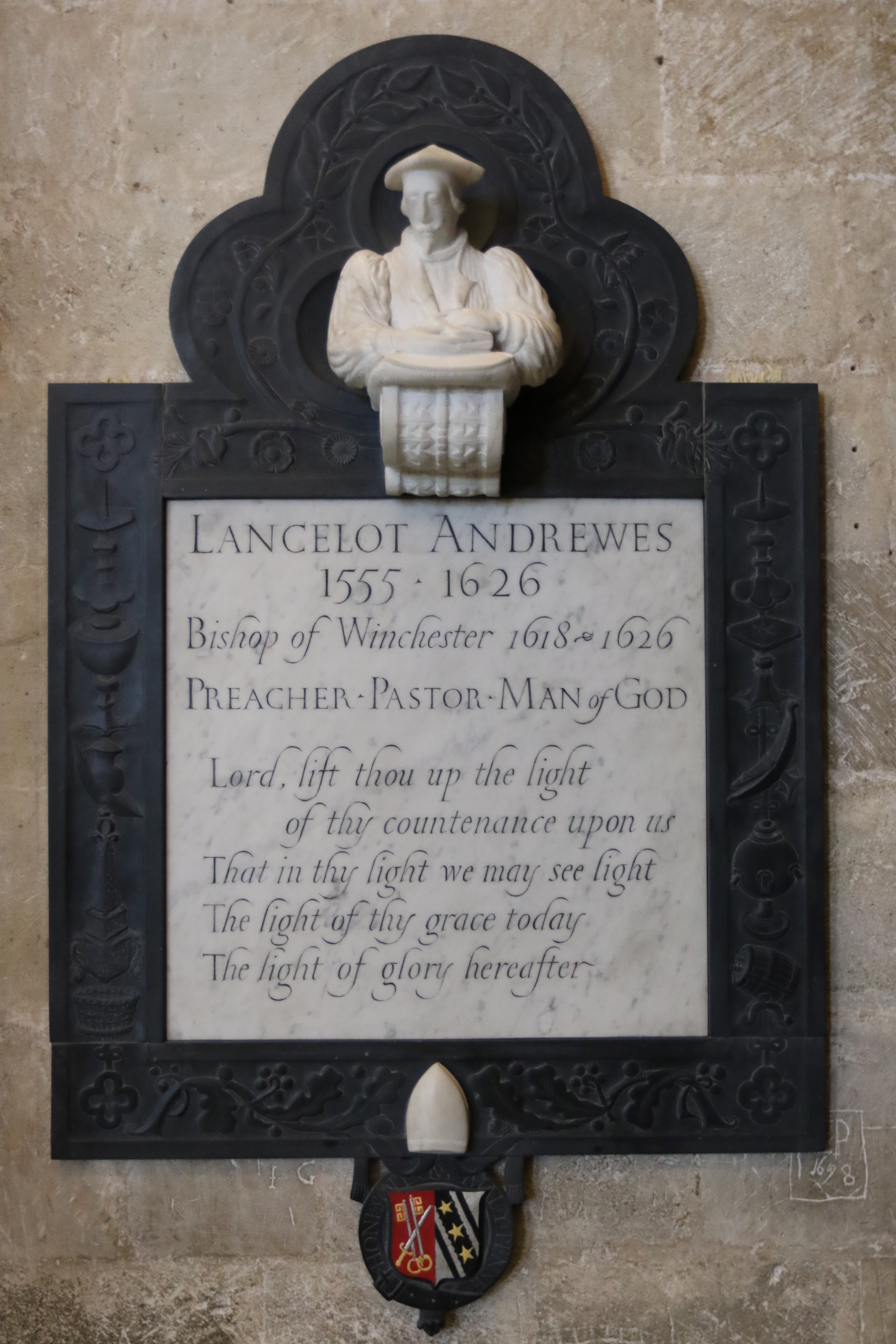
Memorial in Winchester Cathedral

Two generations later, Richard Crashaw caught up the universal sentiment, when in his lines "Upon Bishop Andrewes' Picture before his Sermons" he exclaims:

This reverend shadow cast that setting sun,
Whose glorious course through our horizon run,
Left the dim face of this dull hemisphere,
All one great eye, all drown'd in one great teare.

Andrewes was a friend of Hugo Grotius, and one of the foremost contemporary scholars, but is chiefly remembered for his style of preaching. As a churchman he was typically Anglican, equally removed from the Puritan and the Roman positions. A good summary of his position is found in his First Answer to Cardinal Perron, who had challenged James I's use of the title "Catholic". His position in regard to the Eucharist is naturally more mature than that of the first reformers.

As to the Real Presence we are agreed; our controversy is as to the mode of it. As to the mode we define nothing rashly, nor anxiously investigate, any more than in the Incarnation of Christ we ask how the human is united to the divine nature in One Person. There is a real change in the elements—we allow ut panis iam consecratus non-sit panis quem natura formavit; sed, quem benedictio consecravit, et consecrando etiam immutavit [i.e., "that the bread once consecrated is not the bread which nature has formed, but that which the blessing has consecrated and, by consecrating it, has also changed"]. (Responsio, p. 263)

Adoration is permitted, and the use of the terms "sacrifice" and "altar" maintained as being consonant with scripture and antiquity. Christ is "a sacrifice—so, to be slain; a propitiatory sacrifice—so, to be eaten." (Sermons, vol. ii. p. 296)

By the same rules that the Passover was, by the same may ours be termed a sacrifice. In rigour of speech, neither of them; for to speak after the exact manner of divinity, there is but one only sacrifice, veri nominis, that is Christ's death. And that sacrifice but once actually performed at His death, but ever before represented in figure, from the beginning; and ever since repeated in memory to the world's end. That only absolute, all else relative to it, representative of it, operative by it ... Hence it is that what names theirs carried, ours do the like, and the Fathers make no scruple at it—no more need we.(Sermons, vol. ii. p. 300)

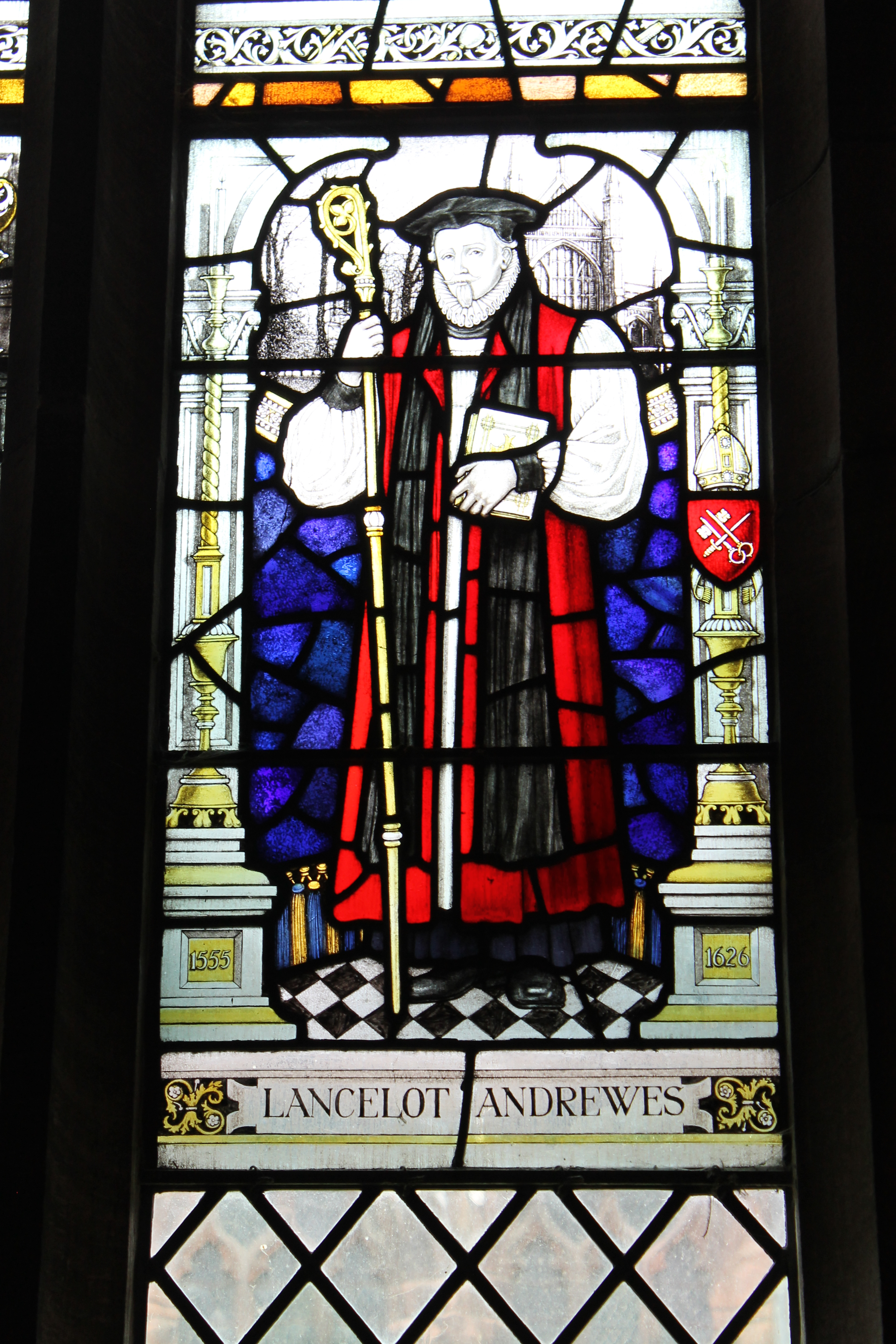
Lancelot Andrewes memorial stained glass window in the cloister of Chester Cathedral

Andrewes preached regularly and submissively before James I and his court on the anniversaries of the Gowrie Conspiracy and the Gunpowder Plot. These sermons were used to promulgate the doctrine of the Divine Right of Kings.

His Life was written by Alexander Whyte (Edinburgh, 1896), M. Wood (New York, 1898), and Robert Lawrence Ottley (Boston, 1894). His services to his church have been summed up thus: (1) he has a keen sense of the proportion of the faith and maintains a clear distinction between what is fundamental, needing ecclesiastical commands, and subsidiary, needing only ecclesiastical guidance and suggestion; (2) as distinguished from the earlier protesting standpoint, e.g. of the Thirty-nine Articles, he emphasised a positive and constructive statement of the Anglican position.

His best-known work is the Preces Privatae or Private Prayers, edited by Alexander Whyte (1896), which has widespread appeal and has remained in print since renewed interest in Andrewes developed in the 19th century. The Preces Privatae were first published by R. Drake in 1648; an improved edition by F. E. Brightman appeared in 1903. John Rutter set some of those prayers to music. Andrewes's other works occupy eight volumes in the Library of Anglo-Catholic Theology (1841–1854). Ninety-six of his sermons were published in 1631 by command of Charles I, have been occasionally reprinted, and are considered among the most rhetorically developed and polished sermons of the late-sixteenth and early-seventeenth centuries. Because of these, Andrewes was commemorated by T. S. Eliot.

Andrewes was considered, next to James Ussher, to be the most learned churchman of his day, and enjoyed a great reputation as an eloquent and impassioned preacher, but the stiffness and artificiality of his style render his sermons unsuited to modern taste. Nevertheless, there are passages of extraordinary beauty and profundity. His doctrine was High Church, and in his life he was humble, pious and charitable. He continues to influence religious thinkers to the present day, and was cited as an influence by T. S. Eliot, among others. Eliot borrowed, almost word for word and without his usual acknowledgement, a passage from Andrewes's 1622 Christmas Day sermon for the opening of his poem "Journey of the Magi". In his 1997 novel Timequake, Kurt Vonnegut suggested that Andrewes was "the greatest writer in the English language", citing as proof the first few verses of the 23rd Psalm. His translation work has also led him to appear as a character in three plays dealing with the King James Bible, Howard Brenton's Anne Boleyn (2010), Jonathan Holmes's Into Thy Hands (2011) and David Edgar's Written on the Heart (2011).

Andrewes depicted in a stained-glass window in St Lawrence Church, Winchester

He has an academic cap named after him, known as the Bishop Andrewes cap, which is like a mortarboard but made of velvet, floppy and has a tump or tuff instead of a tassel. This was in fact the ancient version of the mortarboard before the top square was stiffened and the tump replaced by a tassel and button. This cap is still used by Cambridge D.D.s and at certain institutions as part of their academic dress.

A block of flats in the Barbican Residential Estate, central London, is named Andrewes House. All the Barbican's residential buildings are named after famous people with a connection to the locale.

There is a stained glass window depicting Bishop Andrewes in Grays Inn Chapel, central London.

== Collected works ==
Andrewes created a significant personal library. In his will, he bequeathed approximately 400 volumes to Pembroke College (Cambridge) where they remain.

Collected editions of his works include:

- Works of Lancelot Andrewes, 11 volumes (Oxford, 1841–1854),
- Lancelot Andrewes Collection, 7 volumes

== Styles and titles ==
- 1555–c. 1579: Lancelot Andrewes Esq.
- c. 1579–1589: The Reverend Lancelot Andrewes
- 1589–bef. 1590: The Reverend Prebendary Lancelot Andrewes
- bef. 1590–1594: The Reverend Prebendary Doctor Lancelot Andrewes
- 1594–1601: The Reverend Canon Doctor Lancelot Andrewes
- 1601–1605: The Very Reverend Doctor Lancelot Andrewes
- 1605–1626: The Right Reverend Doctor Lancelot Andrewes

Academic offices
| Preceded by William Fulke | Master of Pembroke College, Cambridge; 1589–1605 | Succeeded by Samuel Harsnett |
Church of England titles
| Preceded by Anthony Watson | Bishop of Chichester; 1605–1609 | Succeeded by Samuel Harsnett |
| Preceded by Martin Heton | Bishop of Ely; 1609–1619 | Succeeded by Nicholas Felton |
| Preceded by James Montague | Bishop of Winchester; 1618–1626 | Succeeded by Richard Neile |
