= If There Is I Haven't Found It Yet =

Play by Nick Payne

- Original language: English
- Written by: Nick Payne
- Characters: 2 male, 2 female
- Genre: Drama/Comedy

Premiere
- Date: 2009
- Place: Bush Theatre, London

If There Is I Haven't Found It Yet is the first full-length professionally produced play by the British playwright Nick Payne. It was produced at the Bush Theatre in London in 2009.

== Productions ==
=== London ===
The play opened in London in 2009 at the Bush Theatre, where it was a smash hit. Directed by Josie Rourke, the cast starred Rafe Spall, Ailish O'Connor, Pandora Collin and Michael Begley. It received positive reviews calling it "flawless" and a "comic tour de force".

Payne received a nomination for the Evening Standard Award for Most Promising Playwright in 2010; he won the George Devine Award.

=== Off-Broadway ===
The play premiered Off-Broadway at the Roundabout Theatre Company Laura Pels Theatre on 20 September 2012. Michael Longhurst directed, with Jake Gyllenhaal starring in his New York stage debut. It was extended and then returned from a hiatus for another two weeks, through 23 December 2012. Designer Beowulf Boritt created an impressive submersible set suggesting a planet under siege. TimeOut New York called it "Stirring, Insightful & Brutally Honest....Using set changes that are both practical and neatly metaphoric, director Michael Longhurst shows that sometimes people with the highest ideals make the biggest messes."

As a family in a tailspin stuck somewhere between knowing what the problems are and doing something about it - questions of what or who really needs saving were presented in this work.

== Plot ==
Anna, overweight and bullied, is neglected by her global warming obsessed father and misunderstood by her mother, a teacher. When her uncle turns up out of the blue he is the only one who seems to be able to get through to her. However, as he becomes more and more obsessed with his ex-girlfriend and his own problems he doesn't notice Anna spiralling into depression.

== Publication ==
The play has been published in the United Kingdom and in the United States.
