= Michael Longhurst =

British theatre director (born 1981)

- Born: 1981 (age 44–45); Bromley, London
- Education: University of Nottingham; Mountview Academy of Theatre Arts
- Occupation: Theatre director
- Partner: Des Kennedy

Michael Longhurst (born 1981) is a British theatre director. He was the artistic director of the Donmar Warehouse theatre in Covent Garden, London (2019-2024). He was appointed as its fourth artistic director, succeeding Josie Rourke in the role.

Longhurst grew up in Bromley, London. After studying philosophy at the University of Nottingham, Longhurst trained in theatre directing at the Mountview Academy of Theatre Arts, graduating with a postgraduate diploma in 2004.

Longhurst's first season at the Donmar started on 20 June 2019 with David Greig’s Europe, followed by the UK premiere of Appropriate by Branden Jacobs-Jenkins.

His previous credits as director include Constellations at the Royal Court Theatre in 2012 and at Trafalgar Studios in 2015, Carmen Disruption at the Almeida Theatre in 2015, Gloria at the Hampstead Theatre in 2017 and, from October 2016 to March 2017 and from February to 24 April 2018, Amadeus at the National Theatre, a production which Michael Billington, in a four-starred review for The Guardian, described as "stunning". In August 2019, his critically acclaimed production of Florian Zeller's The Son transferred from a successful run at the Kiln Theatre to a West End run at The Duke of York's Theatre.

Longhurst lives with his partner Des Kennedy.
