= Miriam and Youssef =

Podcast by the BBC

Miriam and Youssef is a scripted historical fiction podcast produced by the BBC World Service and written by Steve Waters.

== Background ==
The series was produced by the BBC World Service. The show is composed of ten episodes. The show debuted in 2020.

The show was written by Steve Waters. Waters lived on Kibbutz Dalia as a young man. The story is set in 1917 and 1948. The story follows a European Jewish girl named Miriam Cohen, a British seargent named Harry Lister, and an Arab boy named Youssef Bannourah.

== Cast and characters ==
- Amir El-Masry as Youssef Bannourah
- Shani Erez as Miriam Cohen
- Blake Ritson as Harry Lister
- Rami Nasr as Abu Khalid
- Sirine Saba as Umm Khalid
- Philip Arditti as Yehoshua
- Elliot Levey as Ben-Gurion
- Sargon Yelda as Musa Alami
- Neil McCaul as Judah Magnes
