= Limehouse (play) =

Play by Steve Waters

- Original language: English
- Written by: Steve Waters
- Characters: Roy Jenkins; David Owen; Shirley Williams; Bill Rodgers; Deborah Owen
- Genre: Drama
- Setting: Limehouse

Premiere
- Date: 2 March 2017
- Place: Donmar Warehouse

Limehouse is a 2017 play by the English playwright Steve Waters, dramatizing the discussions on 25 January 1981 which led to the Limehouse Declaration later that day.

== Productions ==
The premiere production of Limehouse opened at the Donmar Warehouse on 2 March 2017 and ran until 15 April. The cast consisted of Nathalie Armin as Deborah Owen, Roger Allam as Roy Jenkins, Tom Goodman-Hill as David Owen, Debra Gillett as Shirley Williams and Paul Chahidi as Bill Rodgers.
