= Jonathan Holmes (theatre director) =

UK theatre director and writer (born 1975)

Jonathan Holmes (born 28 October 1975, in South Yorkshire) is a UK theatre director and writer.

Jonathan lives in North London. He is a cousin of army officer William Thomas Forshaw and film director Cy Endfield.

== Education ==
He attended Wath Comprehensive School, The University of Birmingham (where he emerged with a first-class degree), and completed a Ph.D. at The Shakespeare Institute.

== Career ==
For six years, he taught drama at Royal Holloway, University of London, leaving as a Senior Lecturer in 2007. During his time there, he wrote two books: Merely Players (about the rhetoric of classical acting) and Refiguring Mimesis (with Adrian Streete, about aesthetics). He also set up a new degree programme in Drama and English.

During this first career, he became an expert in the work of John Donne, and organised the first live performance for four centuries of several of Donne’s songs at St. Paul’s Cathedral, in 2005. Performers included Dame Emma Kirkby, Carolyn Sampson and The Sixteen. The event sold out, and the proceeds were donated to the charity Peace Direct. In 2011, he also wrote and directed Into Thy Hands, a biographical play on Donne.

In 2007, he wrote, directed and produced the play Fallujah, starring Harriet Walter, Imogen Stubbs and Irène Jacob. It ran in a specially tailored space on Brick Lane, with a score by Nitin Sawhney, and design by the conceptual artist Lucy Orta. At the time, it was the only significant account of the sieges of Fallujah, and is composed entirely of verbatim testimony. In 2008, he collaborated with the choir and period instrument orchestra The Sixteen and actors Alan Howard and Virginia McKenna in a series of concerts at the South Bank Centre.

He has also written and directed two short films starring Rebecca Lenkiewicz, Elliot Cowan and Julian Ovenden, and is nearing completion on a feature documentary, Perpetual Peace. This last includes interviews with peacemakers around the world and features contributions by Harold Pinter, John Berger, Karen Armstrong, George Monbiot, Tony Benn and Noreena Hertz, among others.

In 2008, he set up The Jericho House, a movable performance venue specialising in cross-media collaborations around the theme of hospitality. The Jericho House is groundbreaking in its use of sound and music, leading Holmes to set up a partnership with The Institute of Cognitive Neuroscience examining the effect of sound on the brain.

In 2009, Jericho produced a critically acclaimed site-specific testimony play about the neglect of New Orleans after the hurricane. It was called simply 'Katrina,’ and the run sold out completely.

In 2010, Holmes began a campaign for continuing state support for the arts with an event called 'What’s the point of art?’ attended by many influential people from the creative industries. The resulting public debate led to all three main parties committing to maintaining arts funding at 2009 levels at the next spending round.
