= Temple (play) =

2015 play

- Original language: English
- Written by: Steve Waters

Premiere
- Date: 26 May 2015
- Place: Donmar Warehouse

Temple is a 2015 play by Steve Waters about the 2011 United Kingdom anti-austerity protests. It premiered at the Donmar Warehouse from 21 May to 25 July 2015, directed by Howard Davies and featuring Simon Russell Beale as 'the Dean', along with Anna Calder-Marshall, Paul Higgins, Rebecca Humphries, Shereen Martin and Malcolm Sinclair.
