= Sixty-Six Books =

Set of plays

Sixty-Six Books was a set of plays premiered at the Bush Theatre, London, in 2011, to mark the theatre's reopening on a new site and the 400th anniversary of the King James Version. It drew its title from the 66 books of the Protestant Bible. The special show ran from 10 October 10 to 29 October 2011, with special 24-hour shows on 15 and 29 October; the production featured 130 actors, including Miranda Raison, Ralf Little, Billy Bragg, and Rafe Spall.

== List of plays ==
Book	Title	Author	Cast / notes
Genesis	Godblog	Jeanette Winterson	Catherine Tate
Exodus	The Crossing	Anne Michaels	
Leviticus	The Foundation	Caroline Bird	
Numbers	The Opening of the Mouth	Neil Bartlett	
Deuteronomy	The Rules	Maha Khan Philips	Anjana Vasan
Joshua	Sole Fide - By Faith Alone	Daisy Hasan	
Judges	Beardy	Tom Wells	
Ruth	The Book of Ruth (and Naomi)	Stella Duffy	Kate Duchêne and Nikki Amuka-Bird
1 Samuel	David and Goliath	Andrew Motion	Malcolm Sinclair
2 Samuel	Thus Spake Orunmila ...	Wole Soyinka	
1 Kings	The Suleman	Roy Williams	
2 Kings	Two Bears	Sam Burns	
1 Chronicles	The Chronicle	Salena Godden	
2 Chronicles	From Solomon to Cyrus the Great	Tim Rice	
Ezra	The Strange Wife	Naomi Foyle	
Nehemiah	When he had been loved ...	Mandla Langa	
Esther	Hadassah	Jackie Kay	
Job	In the Land of Uz	Neil LaBute	
Psalms	When We Praise	Kwame Kwei-Armah	
Proverbs	Notes for a Young Gentleman	Toby Litt	
Ecclesiastes	The Preacher, or How Ecclesiastes Changed My Life	Nancy Kricorian	
Song of Solomon	The Beauty of the Church	Carol Ann Duffy	
Isaiah	All the trees of the field	Ian McHugh	
Jeremiah	A Lost Expression	Luke Kennard	
Lamentations	Halter-Neck	Paul Muldoon	
Ezekiel	The Fair and Tender	Owen Sheers	
Daniel	Oliver Lewis	Jack Thorne	Miranda Raison and Dominic Mafham
Hosea	Fugitive Motel	Nick Payne	
Joel	I Notice the Sound First	Yemsi Blake	
Amos	Amos the Shepherd Curses the Rulers of Ancient Israel	Michael Rosen	
Obadiah	The House Next Door	Nancy Harris	
Jonah	Cetacean	Nick Laird	
Micah	Flare	Adam Foulds	
Nahum	God is Jealous	Moira Buffini	
Habakkuk	Habaccuc Dreams	Trevor Griffiths	
Zephaniah	In the night, a promise	Helen Edmundson	
Haggai	it is having fallen out of grace	Suheir Hammad	
Zechariah	The End of the Alphabet	Elinor Cook	
Malachi	When You Left I Thought I'd Die But Now I'm Fine	Molly Naylor	
Matthew	A Nobody	Laura Dockrill	
Mark	Capernaum	Steve Waters	
Luke	Do Unto Others	Billy Bragg	
John	Lazarus	Rowan Williams	
Acts	Acts	Lachlan Mackinnon	
Romans	The Man Who Came to Brunch	Amy Rosenthal	
1 Corinthians	Without Love	Matt Charman	
2 Corinthians	The Wood Orchid	Wena Poon	
Galatians	The Transgressor	Deirdre Kinahan	
Ephesians	Ephesus-Schmephesus	Laurence Marks and Maurice Gran	
Philippians	The Loss of All Things	Chris Goode	
Colossians	Uncool Religion	Zukiswa Wanner	
1 Thessalonians	Paul's First Voicemail to Thessa	D C Jackson	
2 Thessalonians	Falling Away	Christopher Shinn	
1 Timothy	Concerning Faith	David Edgar	
2 Timothy	Hand-Me-Downs	James Graham	
Titus	A Sunday Sermon	Anya Reiss	
Philemon	The Letter	Kamila Shamsie	
Hebrews	The Middle Man	Anthony Weigh	Shaun Dingwall, Syrus Lowe
James	Salvation and Justification Reprised Anew	Brian Chikwava	
1 Peter	Snow in Sheffield	Helen Mort	
2 Peter	False Teachers	Suhayla El Bushra	
1 John	Something, Someone, Somewhere	David Eldridge	
2 John	Men in Verse	Nathalie Handal	
3 John	Room 303	Enda Walsh	
Epistle of Jude	The Goat at Midnight	Anne Carson	
Revelations	Endpapers	Kate Mosse	
