= 400th anniversary of the King James Version =

2011 was the 400th anniversary of the King James Version, when a series of events and exhibitions took place commemorating the four-hundredth anniversary of the publication of the King James Version in 1611.

== By location ==
=== United Kingdom ===
The Shakespeare's Globe theatre marked the anniversary by a week-long complete recital of the work during Holy Week 2011, along with a revival of its 2010 production of Anne Boleyn, which dealt with the King James Version's inception. The Royal Shakespeare Company commissioned a new play, Written on the Heart, also dealing with the KJV translation, to premiere in October 2011.

The Royal National Theatre hosted a reading of 12 extracts from the KJV by actors from its company in October and November 2011 directed by Nicholas Hytner, James Dacre and Polly Findlay and the Bush Theatre reopened in October 2011 on its new site with a performance cycle entitled 'Sixty-Six Books', in which each book of the KJV is responded to by a different writer.

The anniversary was also marked by exhibitions at the libraries of Oxford (supported by a lecture series) and Cambridge universities and in Lambeth Palace Library. Exhibitions were also held at Winchester Cathedral and in the John Rylands Library in Manchester.

=== United States ===
Zondervan released The Holy Bible: 1611 King James Version 400th Anniversary Edition as a replica of the original Authorized Version as it was released in 1611, to mark the anniversary. Digital images from the Bible Museum in Goodyear, Arizona were used to produce this work with the Apocrypha excluded. King James Bible Society marked the 400th anniversary with the online release of the AvBible, an audio visual of the Authorized Version.
