= Donmar Warehouse =

Theatre in Covent Garden, London, England

Coordinates: 51°30′50.2″N 0°7′33.1″W

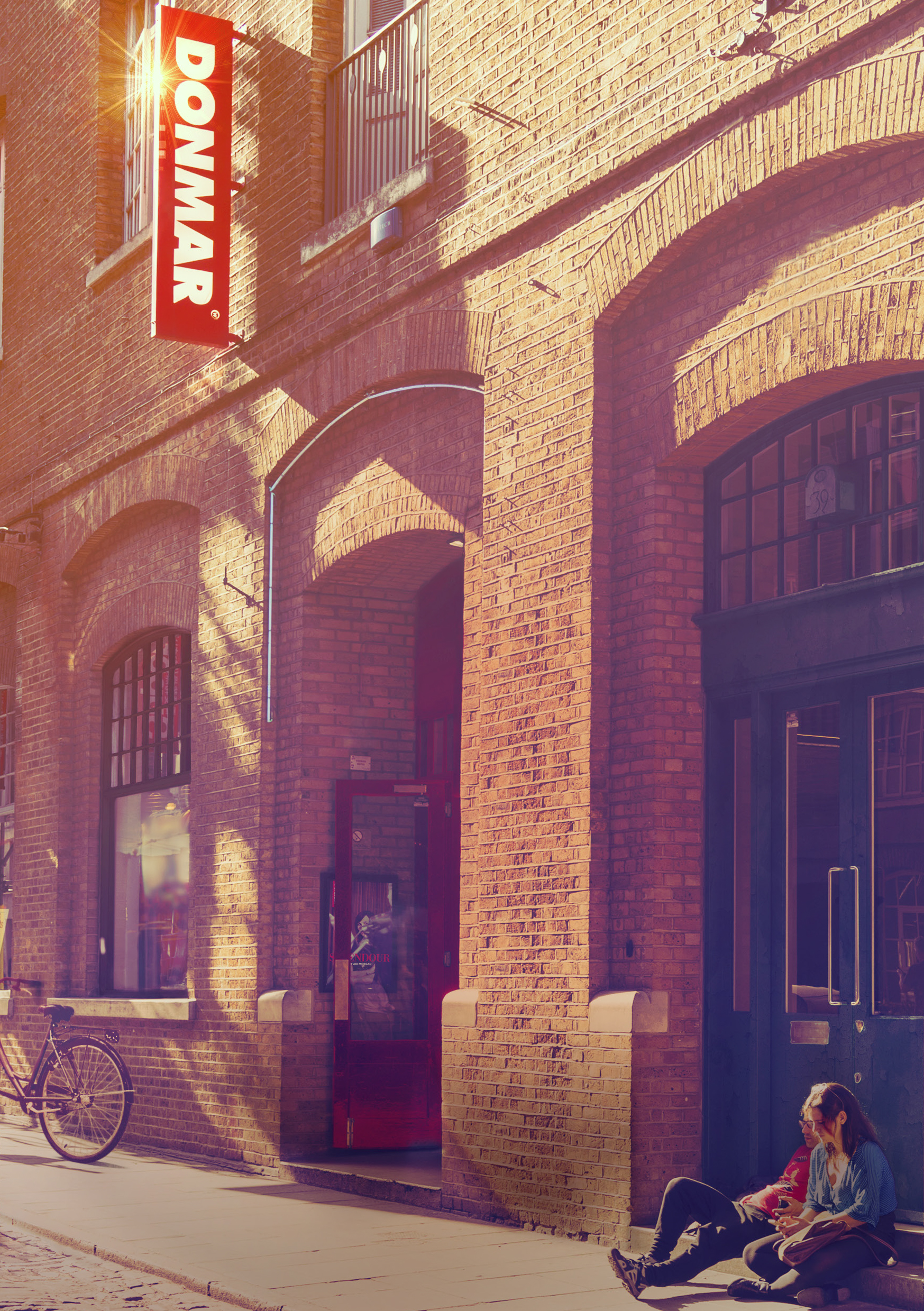
- Donmar Warehouse in 2015
- Interactive map of Donmar Warehouse
- Address: Earlham Street; London, WC2; United Kingdom
- Owner: Donmar Warehouse Projects Ltd
- Capacity: 251 plus 20 standing places
- Type: Off-West End, Nonprofit organization
- Public transit: Covent Garden

Construction
- Years active: 1977–present

Website
- www.donmarwarehouse.com

The Donmar Warehouse is a 251-seat, not-for-profit Off-West End theatre in Covent Garden, London, England. It first opened on 18 July 1977.

Sam Mendes, Michael Grandage, Josie Rourke and Michael Longhurst have all served as artistic director, a post held since March 2024 by Tim Sheader. The theatre produces new writing, contemporary reappraisals of European classics, British and American drama and small-scale musical theatre.

As well as presenting at least six productions a year at its home in Covent Garden, the theatre often transfers shows to the West End, Broadway and elsewhere.

== History ==
Theatrical producer Donald Albery formed Donmar Productions around 1953, with the name derived from the first three letters of his name and the first three letters of his friend, ballerina Margot Fonteyn. In 1961, he bought the warehouse, a building that in the 1870s had been a vat room and hops warehouse for the local brewery in Covent Garden, and in the 1920s had been used as a film studio and then the Covent Garden Market banana-ripening depot. His son Ian Albery, a producer and theatre design consultant, converted the warehouse into a private rehearsal studio.

In 1977, the Royal Shakespeare Company acquired it as a theatre and renamed it Warehouse, converting and equipping at "immense speed". The first show, which opened on 18 July 1977, was Schweik in the Second World War, directed by Howard Davies, which transferred from the Other Place in Stratford. The electricity for the theatre was turned on just 30 minutes before curtain up, and the concrete steps up to the theatre were still wet.

The Warehouse was an RSC workshop as much as a showcase and the seasons included Trevor Nunn's Stratford 1976 Macbeth, starring Judi Dench and Ian McKellen, which opened at the Covent Garden venue in September 1977 before transferring to the Young Vic. The RSC went on to stage numerous productions, both original and transfers from The Other Place, Stratford. In 1980 nearly all the RSC company were involved in Nicholas Nickleby so a new two hander was found from the pile of submitted scripts. Educating Rita, with Julie Walters and Mark Kingston directed by Mike Ockrent, went on to be one of the RSC's biggest successes.

From 1983 to 1989 it came under the artistic directorship of Nica Burns.

In 1989, Roger Wingate was responsible for the acquisition of the Donmar Warehouse, following which it was completely rebuilt and re-equipped prior to its reopening in 1992. Wingate appointed Sam Mendes as the theatre's first Artistic Director. Wingate is Honorary Life President of the Donmar.

=== Under Sam Mendes (1992–2002) ===
The Donmar became an independent producing house in 1992 with Sam Mendes as artistic director. His opening production was Stephen Sondheim's Assassins. He followed this with a series of classic revivals.

Among Mendes' productions were John Kander and Fred Ebb's Cabaret, Tennessee Williams's The Glass Menagerie, Stephen Sondheim's Company, Alan Bennett's Habeas Corpus and his farewell duo of Chekhov's Uncle Vanya and Twelfth Night, which transferred to the Brooklyn Academy of Music.

Under Mendes, Matthew Warchus's production of Sam Shepard's True West, Katie Mitchell's of Beckett's Endgame, David Leveaux's of Sophocles's Elektra and Tom Stoppard's The Real Thing were all productions at Donmar. Mendes' successor Michael Grandage directed some of the key productions of the later part of Mendes' tenure, including Peter Nichols's Passion Play and Privates on Parade and Sondheim's Merrily We Roll Along.

=== Under Michael Grandage (2002–2011) ===
In 2002 Michael Grandage succeeded Sam Mendes as Artistic Director. Grandage appointed Douglas Hodge and Jamie Lloyd as Associate Directors; in 2007 Rob Ashford succeeded Hodge.

For its revivals of foreign plays, the company regularly commissioned new translations or versions, including Ibsen's The Wild Duck (David Eldridge), Racine's Phaedra (Frank McGuinness), Dario Fo's Accidental Death of an Anarchist (Simon Nye) and Strindberg's Creditors (David Greig).

Its musical productions included Grand Hotel and the Stephen Sondheim works, Pacific Overtures, Merrily We Roll Along, Company, Into the Woods and the 1992 production of Assassins that opened Sam Mendes' tenure as Artistic Director.

Under the umbrella of Warehouse Productions, the theatre sometimes opened shows in the West End, including 1999's Suddenly Last Summer and 2005's Guys and Dolls.

Many well-known actors have appeared at the theatre, including Nicole Kidman (The Blue Room), Gwyneth Paltrow (Proof), Ian McKellen (The Cut) and Ewan McGregor (Othello).

With only 250 seats, the tickets for Othello starring McGregor were in such demand that Grandage feared it could become "a bad news story". His response was to plan a one-year season at the 750-seat Wyndham's Theatre, four major new productions presented by Donmar West End. It commenced on 12 September 2008, with Kenneth Branagh in the title role of Chekhov's Ivanov, given in a new version by Tom Stoppard and directed by Grandage. The West End season continued with Derek Jacobi in Twelfth Night, Judi Dench in Yukio Mishima's Madame de Sade and Jude Law in Hamlet, all directed by Grandage.

Following the Donmar West End season, the Donmar held three productions internationally: transfers of Red, Piaf and Creditors, to Broadway, Madrid and the Brooklyn Academy of Music respectively. Furthermore, from 30 September through December, the Donmar had the first of three year resident spots at Trafalgar Studios 2, in order to showcase its past Resident Assistant Directors.

In February 2011, the Donmar collaborated with the National Theatre Live programme to broadcast its production of King Lear, starring Derek Jacobi, to cinemas around the world. With over 350 screens in 20 countries, this single performance of King Lear was seen by more than 30,000 people.

=== Under Josie Rourke (2012–2019) ===
In January 2012, Josie Rourke became the third Artistic Director in the Donmar's history. The first production under her leadership was George Farquhar's The Recruiting Officer, which Rourke also directed. Her first season also included Robert Holman's 1987 play, Making Noise Quietly, directed by Peter Gill; Jack Thorne's new version of The Physicists by Swiss playwright Friedrich Duerrenmatt; Brian Friel's Philadelphia, Here I Come!, directed by Lyndsey Turner; and Rourke's own production of Jean Racine's Berenice, in a new translation by Alan Hollinghurst and Phyllida Lloyd's all female Julius Caesar, which later went on to play at the St. Ann's Warehouse, New York.

The Donmar built a temporary, in-the-round, 420-seat theatre next to King's Cross station. This theatre housed the all-female Shakespeare trilogy: The Tempest, Julius Caesar and Henry IV, directed by Phyllida Lloyd, from September to December 2016.

=== Under Michael Longhurst (2019–2024) ===
In June 2018, Michael Longhurst was named the fourth Artistic Director of the Donmar Warehouse. Longhurst's previous credits include Constellations at the Royal Court Theatre and Amadeus at the National Theatre.

Longhurst's first season at the Donmar started on 20 June 2019 with David Greig’s Europe, followed by the UK premiere of Appropriate by Branden Jacobs-Jenkins. Further planned productions include [Blank] by Alice Birch, the UK premiere of Mike Lew's Teenage Dick and the season closes with Caryl Churchill's Far Away. He directed a revival of Constellations in the West End with four different casts. The theatre reopened in September 2021 and further productions included Henry V with Kit Harington, Macbeth with David Tennant and Cush Jumbo, and the musicals The Band's Visit and Next to Normal.

=== Tim Sheader (2024-present) ===
In March 2024, Tim Sheader took over as artistic director.

== Productions ==
=== 1990s ===
- Assassins (22 October 1992 – 9 January 1993)
- Richard III (14 January–20 February 1993)
- Playland (25 February–17 April 1993)
- Don't Fool With Love (22 April–15 May 1993)
- Translations (3 June–24 July 1993)
- Here (9 July–11 September 1993)
- The Life of Stuff (16 September–6 November 1993)
- Hamlet (10–27 November 1993)
- Cabaret (2 December 1993 – 26 March 1994)
- Half Time (4, 5, 11 and 12 February 1994)
- Maria Friedman by Special Arrangement (20, 27 February and 6 March 1994)
- Beautiful Thing (29 March–23 April 1994)
- Maria Friedman by Special Arrangement by Further Arrangement (23 May–11 June 1994)
- Glengarry Glen Ross (16 June–27 August 1994)
- Design for Living (1 September–5 November 1994)
- True West (9 November–3 December 1994)
- The Threepenny Opera (8 December 1994 – 18 March 1995)
- Highland Fling (21 March–8 April 1995)
- Our Boys (11 April–13 May 1995)
- Insignificance (1 June–6 August 1995)
- The Glass Menagerie (7 September–5 November 1995)
- Rupert Street Lonely Hearts Club (7–25 November 1995)
- Company (1 December 1995 – 2 March 1996)
- The King of Prussia (4–9 March 1996)
- Buddleia (12–16 March 1996)
- Song from a Forgotten City (18–23 March 1996)
- Bondagers (27 March–6 April 1996)
- Endgame (11 April–25 May 1996)
- Habeas Corpus (30 May–27 July 1996)
- Hedda Gabler (30 July–31 August 1996)
- Pentecost (3–28 September 1996)
- Fool for Love (3 October–30 November 1996)
- Nine (6 December 1996 – 8 March 1997)
- Badfinger (11–22 March 1997)
- Summer Begins (25 March–5 April 1997)
- Halloween Night (8–19 April 1997)
- The Fix (26 April–14 June 1997)
- The Maids (19 June–9 August 1997)
- The Seagull (12 August–6 September 1997)
- Enter the Guardsman (11 September–18 October 1997)
- Electra (21 October–6 December 1997)
- The Front Page (10 December 1997 – 28 February 1998)
- In a Little World of our Own (3–7 March 1998)
- Tell Me (9–14 March 1998)
- Timeless (17–21 March 1998)
- Sleeping Around (23–28 March 1998)
- The Real Inspector Hound/Black Comedy (Tour: 25 March–11 April 1998, West End: 16 April–31 October 1998, Tour: 18 August–23 October 1999)
- The Bullet (2 April–2 May 1998)
- A Kind of Alaska, The Lover & The Collection (7 May–13 June 1998)
- How I Learned to Drive (18 June–8 August 1998)
- Divas at the Donmar with Ann Hampton Callaway & Liz Callaway, Barbara Cook and Imelda Staunton (10 August–5 September 1998)
- The Blue Room (10 September–31 October 1998)
- Into the Woods (6 November 1998 – 13 February 1999)
- Splash Hatch on the E Going Down (16–27 February 1999)
- Morphic Resonance (17–27 February 1999)
- Three Days of Rain (1–13 March 1999)
- Suddenly, Last Summer (Tour: 3 March–3 April 1999, West End: 8 April–17 July 1999)
- Good (18 March–22 May 1999)
- The Real Thing (27 May–7 August 1999)
- Divas at the Donmar with Patti LuPone, Audra McDonald and Sam Brown (9 August–4 September 1999)
- Antigone (Tour: 6–25 September 1999, West End: 27 September–18 December 1999)
- Juno and the Paycock (9 September–6 November 1999)

=== 2000s ===
- Three Days of Rain (9 November–22 December 1999 & 5–22 January 2000)
- American Buffalo (28 January–26 February 2000)
- Helpless (2 March–8 April 2000)
- Passion Play (13 April–10 June 2000)
- Orpheus Descending (15 June–12 August 2000)
- Divas at the Donmar with Betty Buckley and Clive Rowe (21 August–9 September 2000)
- To the Green Fields Beyond (14 September–25 November 2000)
- Merrily We Roll Along (1 December 2000 – 3 March 2001)
- Boston Marriage (8 March–14 April 2001)
- Tales from Hollywood (19 April–23 June 2001)
- A Lie of the Mind (28 June–1 September 2001)
- Divas at the Donmar with Clive Rowe, Siân Phillips and Michael Ball (3–29 September 2001)
- The Little Foxes (4 October–24 November 2001)
- Privates on Parade (30 November 2001 – 2 March 2002)
- Jesus Hopped the 'A' Train (6–30 March 2002)
- Frame 312 (11–30 March 2002)
- Lobby Hero (10 April–4 May 2002)
- Proof (9 May–15 June 2002)
- Take Me Out (20 June–3 August 2002)
- Divas at the Donmar with Janie Dee, Ruby Turner, Philip Quast and Kristin Chenoweth (5–31 August 2002)
- Uncle Vanya (6 September–20 November 2002)
- Twelfth Night (11 October–30 November 2002)
- The Vortex (5 December 2002 – 15 February 2003)
- Accidental Death of an Anarchist (20 February–18 April 2003)
- Caligula (24 April–14 June 2003)
- Pacific Overtures (20 June–6 September 2003)
- The Hotel in Amsterdam (11 September–15 November 2003)
- After Miss Julie (20 November 2003 – 7 February 2004)
- World Music (12 February–13 March 2004)
- The Dark (18 March–24 April 2004)
- Pirandello's Henry IV (29 April–26 June 2004)
- Old Times (1 July–4 September 2004)
- Hecuba (9 September–12 November 2004)
- Grand Hotel (19 November 2004 – 12 February 2005)
- Days of Wine and Roses (17 February–2 April 2005)
- The Cosmonaut's Last Message... (7 April–21 May 2005)
- Guys and Dolls (West End; 20 May 2005 – 6 December 2007)
- This Is How It Goes (26 May–9 July 2005)
- Mary Stuart (14 July–3 September 2005)
- The Philanthropist (8 September–15 October 2005)
- The God of Hell (20 October–2 December 2005)
- The Wild Duck (8 December 2005 – 18 February 2006)
- The Cut (23 February–1 April 2006)
- Phèdre (6 April–3 June 2006)
- A Voyage Round My Father (8 June–5 August 2006)
- Frost/Nixon (10 August–7 October 2006)
- The Cryptogram (12 October–25 November 2006)
- Don Juan in Soho (30 November 2006 – 10 February 2007)
- John Gabriel Borkman (15 February–14 April 2007)
- Kiss of the Spider Woman (19 April–26 May 2007)
- Betrayal (31 May–21 July 2007)
- Absurdia (26 July–8 September 2007)
- Parade (14 September–24 November 2007)
- Othello (4 December 2007 – 23 February 2008)
- The Man Who Had All the Luck (28 February–5 April 2008)
- Small Change (10 April–31 May 2008)
- The Chalk Garden (5 June–2 August 2008)
- Piaf (8 August–20 September 2008)
- Ivanov (Donmar West End; 12 September–29 November 2008)
- Creditors (25 September–15 November 2008)
- The Family Reunion (20 November 2008 – 17 January 2009)
- Twelfth Night (Donmar West End; 5 December 2008 – 7 March 2009)
- Be Near Me (22 January–14 March 2009)
- Dimetos (19 March–9 May 2009)
- Madame de Sade (Donmar West End; 23 March–23 May 2009)
- A Doll's House (14 May–18 July 2009)
- Hamlet (Donmar West End; 29 May–22 August 2009)
- A Streetcar Named Desire (23 July–3 October 2009)
- Life is a Dream (8 October–28 November 2009)

=== 2010s ===
- Red (3 December 2009 – 6 February 2010)
- Serenading Louie (11 February–27 March 2010)
- Polar Bears (1 April–22 May 2010)
- The Late Middle Classes (27 May–17 July 2010)
- The Prince of Homburg (22 July–4 September 2010)
- Passion (10 September–27 November 2010)
- Lower Ninth (Donmar Trafalgar; 30 September–23 October 2010)
- Novecento (Donmar Trafalgar; 28 October–20 November 2010)
- Les Parents Terribles (Donmar Trafalgar; 25 November–18 December 2010)
- King Lear (3 December 2010 – 5 February 2011)
- The 25th Annual Putnam County Spelling Bee (11 February–2 April 2011)
- Moonlight (7 April–28 May 2011)
- Luise Miller (8 June–30 July 2011)
- Anna Christie (4 August–8 October 2011)
- Inadmissible Evidence (13 October–26 November 2011)
- Salt, Root & Roe (Donmar Trafalgar; 10 November–3 December 2011)
- Richard II (1 December 2011 – 4 February 2012)
- Dublin Carol (Donmar Trafalgar; 8–31 December 2011)
- Huis Clos (Donmar Trafalgar; 5–28 January 2012)
- The Recruiting Officer (9 February–14 April 2012)
- Making Noise Quietly (19 April–26 May 2012)
- The Physicists (31 May–21 July 2012)
- Philadelphia, Here I Come! (26 July–22 September 2012)
- Berenice (27 September–24 November 2012)
- Julius Caesar (30 November 2012 – 9 February 2013)
- Trelawny of the Wells (15 February 2013 – 13 April 2013)
- The Promise (Donmar Trafalgar; 15 November–8 December 2012)
- Julius Caesar (30 November 2012 – 9 February 2013)
- The Dance of Death (Donmar Trafalgar; 13 December 2012 – 5 January 2013)
- The Silence of the Sea (Donmar Trafalgar; 10 January–2 February 2013)
- Trelawny of the Wells (15 February–13 April 2013)
- The Weir (18 April–8 June 2013)
- The Night Alive (13 June–27 July 2013)
- The Same Deep Water As Me (1 August–28 September 2013)
- Roots (3 October 2013 – 30 November 2013)
- Coriolanus (6 December 2013 – 13 February 2014)
- Versailles (20 February–5 April 2014)
- Privacy (10 April–31 May 2014)
- Fathers and Sons (5 June–26 July 2014)
- My Night With Reg (31 July 2014 – 27 September 2014)
- Henry IV (31 July 2014 – 27 September 2014)
- City of Angels (5 December 2014 – 7 February 2015)
- Closer (12 February – 4 April 2015)
- The Vote (24 April – 7 May 2015)
- Temple (21 May – 25 July 2015)
- Splendour (30 July – 26 September 2015)
- Teddy Ferrara (2 October – 5 December 2015)
- Les Liaisons Dangereuses (11 December 2015 – 13 February 2016)
- Welcome Home, Captain Fox! (18 February – 16 April 2016)
- Elegy (21 April – 18 June 2016)
- Faith Healer (23 June – 20 August 2016)
- One Night in Miami (6 October – 3 December 2016)
- Saint Joan (9 December 2016 – 18 February 2017)
- Limehouse (2 March – 15 April 2017)
- The Resistible Rise of Arturo Ui (21 April – 17 June 2017)
- Committee... (23 June – 12 August 2017)
- Knives in Hens (17 August – 7 October 2017)
- The Lady from the Sea (12 October – 2 December 2017)
- Belleville (7 December – 3 February 2018)
- The York Realist (8 February – 24 March 2018)
- The Way of the World (29 March – 26 May 2018)
- The Prime of Miss Jean Brodie (play) (4 June – 28 July 2018)
- Aristocrats (play) (2 August – 22 September 2018)
- St Nicholas (play) (Donmar Dryden Street; 10 September – 5 October 2018)
- Measure For Measure ( 28 September – 1 December 2018)
- Sweat ( 7 December – 26 January 2019)
- Berberian Sound Studio (based on the film) (8 February – 30 March 2019)
- Sweet Charity (6 April – 8 June 2019)
- Europe (20 June – 10 August 2019)
- Appropriate (16 August – 5 October 2019)
- [BLANK] (11 October – 30 November 2019)
- Teenage Dick (6 December – 1 February 2020)

=== 2020s ===
- Far Away (6 February - 14 March 2020)
- Blindness (1 August - 5 September 2020)
- Constellations (Vaudeville Theatre; 18 June - 12 September 2021)
- Love and Other Acts of Violence (7 October - 27 November 2021)
- Force Majeure (10 December 2021 - 5 February 2022)
- Henry V (11 February - 9 April 2022)
- Marys Seacole (15 April - 5 June 2022)
- A Dolls House, Part 2 (10 June - 6 August 2022)
- The Trials (12 - 27 August 2022)
- Silence (1 - 17 September 2022)
- The Band's Visit (26 September - 3 December 2022)
- Watch on the Rhine (9 December 2022 - 4 February 2023)
- Trouble in Butetown (10 February - 25 March 2023)
- Private Lives (7 April - 27 May 2023)
- When Winston Went to War with the Wireless (2 June - 29 July 2023)
- Next to Normal (12 August - 7 October 2023)
- Clyde's (13 October - 2 December 2023)
- Macbeth (8 December 2023 - 10 February 2024)
- The Fear of 13 (4 October 2024 - 30 November 2024)
- Natasha, Pierre & The Great Comet of 1812 (7 December 2024 - 8 February 2025)
- Evening All Afternoon (14 February 2026 - 11 April 2026)

== See also ==
- West End theatre
- List of London venues
