= Steve Waters =

British playwright

Steve Waters is a British playwright. He was born in Coventry, England. He studied English at Oxford University, taught in secondary schools and was a graduate of David Edgar's MA in Playwriting in 1993, a course which Waters later ran for several years. He has written about the pedagogy of playwriting, contributed articles to The Guardian, essays to The Blackwell Companion to Modern British and Irish Drama and The Cambridge Companion to Harold Pinter, and has written a book entitled The Secret Life of Plays (2010).

== Plays ==
- English Journeys (1998)
- After The Gods (2002)
- World Music (2003)
- The Unthinkable (2004)
- Fast Labour (2008)
- The Contingency Plan (2009)
- Little Platoons (2011)
- Ignorance/ Jahiliyyah (2012)
- The Air Gap (2012) A radio play broadcast by BBC Radio 4.
- Bretton Woods (2014) Broadcast on BBC Radio 3.
- Scribblers (2015) BBC Radio 3
- Temple (2015)
- The Play About Calais (2016)
- Limehouse (2017)
- The Fall of the Shah (2019)
- The Last King of Scotland (2019)
- Miriam and Youssef (2020)

== Collaborative works ==
The Bush Theatre's 2011 project Sixty Six Books used the King James Bible as inspiration for new theatre. Waters contributed the short play Capernaum. He also adapted and translated Habitats by Philippe Minyana. Waters collaborated with the Menagerie Theatre Company, with Out of Your Knowledge (2005-08) and Offstage Theatre Company, with Amphibians (2011).

== Sources ==
- Theatre review: The Contingency Plan, Bush, London
