= Jess Murphy =

New Zealand-born chef

Jess Murphy is a New Zealand-born chef based in Galway, Ireland. In 2017, she was named Hotel & Catering Review Ireland's Chef of the Year.

Murphy grew up in the small town of Wairoa in New Zealand's North Island. She left school at the age of 15 and worked in a bar and washing dishes in Hastings to pay for catering college. When she was 19, she moved to Perth, Western Australia, to work in the restaurant industry.

In 2000, Murphy moved to Manchester and worked there for two years, followed by two years back home in Hawkes' Bay. She then moved to Ireland and worked as a chef until opening her own restaurant, Kai Cafe, in Galway in partnership with her husband David Murphy.
