= Coronet Theatre, Notting Hill =

Theatre in London, England

The Coronet Theatre Notting Hill
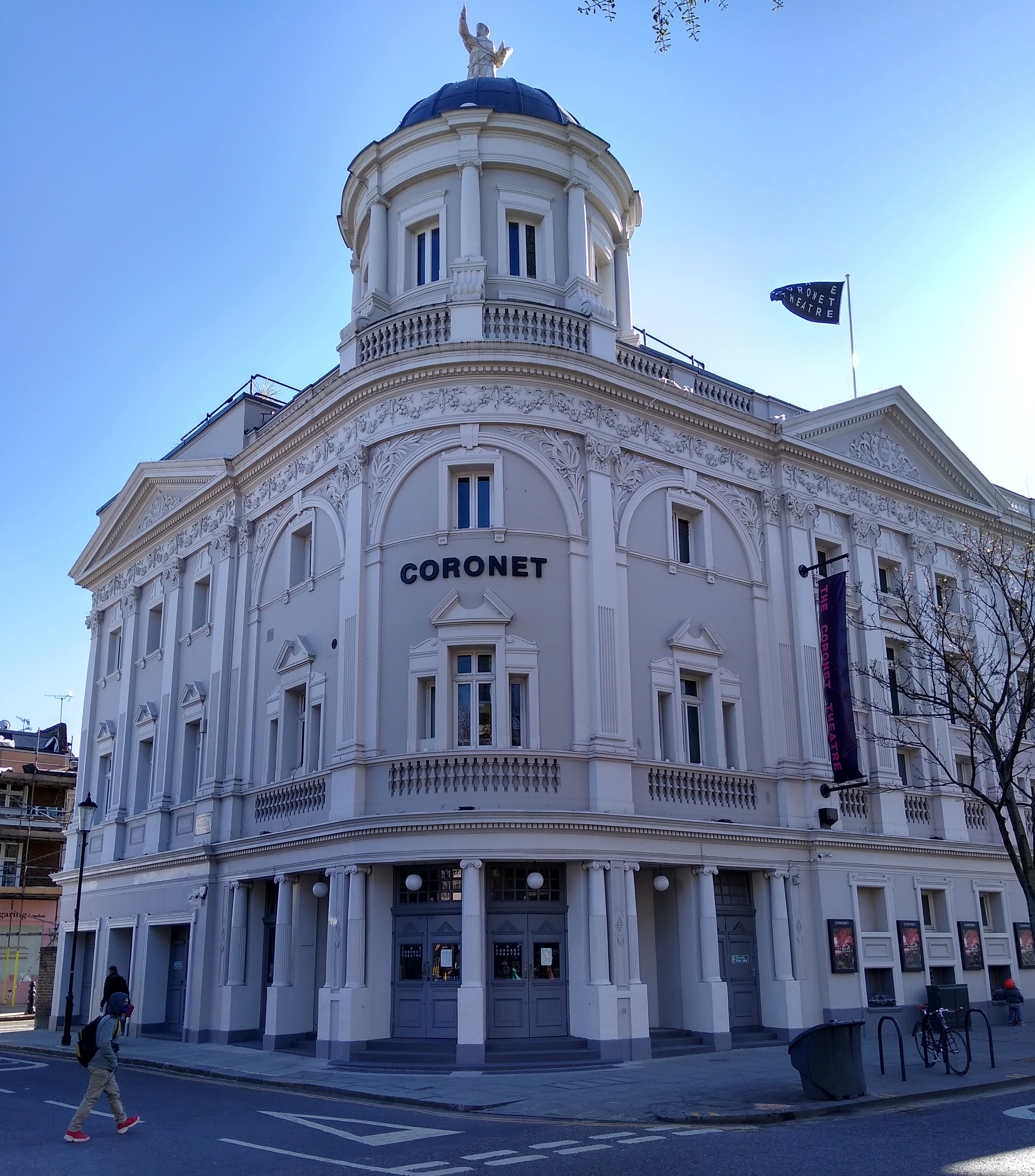
- The Coronet Theatre in 2021
- Interactive map of The Coronet Theatre Notting Hill
- Full name: The Coronet Theatre
- Former names: Coronet Theatre (1898–1950); Gaumont Theatre (1950–1977); Coronet Cinema (1977–2014); The Print Room at the Coronet (2014–May 2019); The Coronet Theatre (May 2019 - present)
- Address: 103–111 Notting Hill Gate, London W11 3LB
- Location: London
- Coordinates: 51°30′31″N 00°11′53″W
- Capacity: originally 1,143 seats 388 + 151 seats as a cinema At present as a theatre 195 seats
- Type: Theatre 2014 - present Cinema 1923–2014
- Public transit: Notting Hill Gate Underground station

Construction
- Built: 1898
- Opened: 1898
- Renovated: 1923, 1931, 1950, 1977, 1996, 2014
- Cost: £25,000
- Architect: W. G. R. Sprague

Website
- https://www.thecoronettheatre.com/

The Coronet Theatre is a theatre located in Notting Hill, London. Built in 1898, it operated as a cinema from 1923–2013, most recently as The Coronet Cinema. In 2014 the building was acquired by a nearby theatre company, The Print Room, which converted it once again into a theatre. The Coronet now produces a programme of stage plays, art, dance, poetry, film and music, staging lesser-known work by classic authors and new works by contemporary dramatists. It has a main auditorium and a smaller black box theatre and studio space called The Print Room.

== History ==
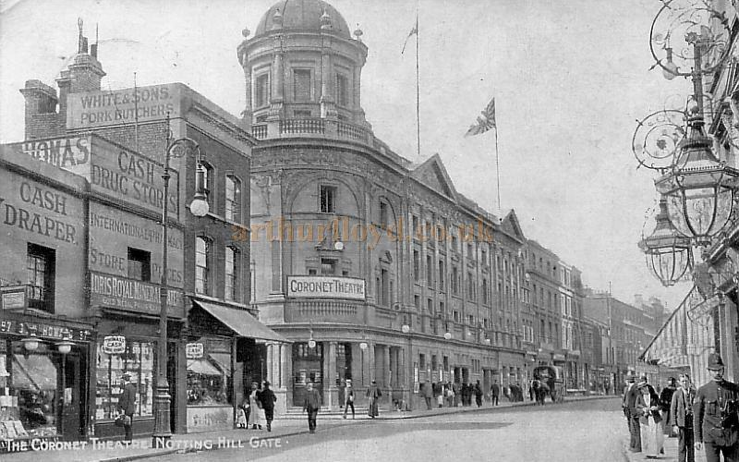
Coronet Theatre, c. 1904

The Coronet Theatre was designed by leading architect W. G. R. Sprague at a cost of £25,000, and opened in 1898 with 1,143 seats. It was described in The Era as a "theatre of which the whole country may be proud". Famous actors who performed in it included Ellen Terry and Sarah Bernhardt. However, the theatre suffered from being outside London's West End theatrical district while still close to be in competition with it.

In 1916, films were shown at the theatre for the first time, as part of variety programmes mixing live and filmed performances. It became a cinema full-time in 1923 with a slightly reduced capacity of 1,010 seats but retaining its original theatre seating arrangement of stalls, dress circle tier, and gallery tier, and boxes on each side of the auditorium. The stage was blocked off and a cinema screen placed within the proscenium arch. The projection equipment was housed in the former dress circle bar.

In 1931 the cinema became part of Gaumont-British, at which point the theatre boxes were removed. In 1950, it was renamed the Gaumont, and the upper tier was closed for seating, reducing the cinema's capacity to 196 in the dress circle and 319 in the stalls. In 1971 the Rank Organisation, which had taken over Gaumont in 1941, proposed to demolish the building, but a local campaign based upon its architectural merit and history secured both its survival and a refurbishment.

In 1977 it was sold by Rank to an independent cinema operator, and its name reverted to the Coronet. The new owners replaced the seating in the stalls so as to provide more leg room, reducing the total cinema capacity to 399 seats. A later threat to the building in 1989 was averted by its gaining protected status as a Grade II listing. In 1996, a second screen with seating for 151 was opened in the stage area. In 2004 it was acquired by the Kensington Temple, a large local Pentecostal church congregation, but continued to offer mainstream independent cinema programming.

In 2014 The Print Room, a fringe theatre in nearby Westbourne Grove, acquired and moved into the building. The company adapted it to have a primary 195-seat stage and secondary 100-seat black box theatre, branded as Print Room at the Coronet. In 2019 the company rebranded the theatre to its original 1898 name The Coronet Theatre.

== Productions ==
Plays performed at the Coronet have included:

- Fabrication by Pier Paolo Pasolini (2010)
- Snake in the Grass by Alan Ayckbourn (2011)
- Kingdom of Earth by Tennessee Williams (2011)
- One for the Road/Victoria Station by Harold Pinter (2011)
- Judgement Day by Mike Poulton, a new version of Henrik Ibsen's When We Dead Awaken (2011)
- Uncle Vanya by Anton Chekhov in a new version by Mike Poulton (2012)
- Thom Pain (Based on Nothing) by Will Eno (2008)
- Lot and His God by Howard Barker (2012)
- Molly Sweeney by Brian Friel (2013)
- 4000 Miles by Amy Herzog (2013)
- The Last Yankee by Arthur Miller (2013)
- The Dumb Waiter by Harold Pinter (2013)
- The Cocktail Party by T.S. Eliot (2015)
- Ubu and the Truth Commission directed by William Kentridge in collaboration with Handspring Puppet Company (2015)
- Five Finger Exercise by Peter Shaffer (2016)
- Deathwatch by Jean Genet (2016)
- In the Depths of Love by Howard Barker (2017)
- Trouble in Mind by Alice Childress (2017)

== Awards and nominations ==
- Peter Brook Empty Space Award Nominee 2011
- Ruth Sutcliffe received the 2012 Offie for "Best Set Designer" (Kingdom of Earth)
- Neil Alexander received the 2012 Offie for "Best Sound Designer" (Snake in The Grass)
- 2013 Offie for Uncle Vanya

== In popular culture ==
The Coronet featured in the 1999 film Notting Hill, as the cinema where a sad Will Thacker (Hugh Grant) watches a film starring his romantic love interest Anna Scott (Julia Roberts) after they have separated. The cinema is also the home of the character Matt Hatter in the animated series Matt Hatter Chronicles.

== Bibliography ==
- Barbara Denny, Notting Hill and Holland Park Past, Historical Publications, 1993, ISBN 978-0-948667-18-3
