= Truth and Reconciliation Commission (South Africa) =

Restorative justice tribunal in post-apartheid South Africa

- Established: 1996
- Location: Cape Town, South Africa
- Composition method: Court-like restorative justice
- Authorised by: Promotion of National Unity and Reconciliation Act, No. 34 of 1995
- Type of tribunal: TRC
- Website: www.justice.gov.za/trc/

The Truth and Reconciliation Commission (TRC) was a court-like restorative justice body assembled in South Africa in 1996 after the end of apartheid. (Note: Though it is a common claim that the TRC was a restorative justice body, it has been argued that the connection between the TRC and restorative justice is not as straightforward and unproblematic as often assumed.) Authorised by Nelson Mandela and chaired by Desmond Tutu, the commission invited witnesses who were identified as victims of gross human rights violations to give statements about their experiences, and selected some for public hearings. Perpetrators of violence could also give testimony and request amnesty from both civil and criminal prosecution.

The Institute for Justice and Reconciliation was established in 2000 as the successor organisation of the TRC.

== Creation and mandate ==
The TRC was set up in terms of the Promotion of National Unity and Reconciliation Act, No. 34 of 1995, and was based in Cape Town. The hearings started in 1996. The mandate of the commission was to bear witness to, record, and in some cases grant amnesty to the perpetrators of crimes relating to human rights violations, as well as offering reparation and rehabilitation to the victims. A register of reconciliation was also established so that ordinary South Africans who wished to express regret for past failures could also express their remorse.

The TRC had a number of high-profile members, including Archbishop Desmond Tutu (chairman), Alex Boraine (deputy chairman), Sisi Khampepe, Wynand Malan, Klaas de Jonge and Emma Mashinini.

The TRC's mandate was enriched by Tutu with the spirit of the indigenous African concept Ubuntu, which tends to translate across cultures as a spiritual awareness of our interconnectedness as a human family; and more specifically in Xhosa, that together, we make one another human.

== Committees ==
The work of the TRC was accomplished through three committees:

- The Human Rights Violations Committee investigated human rights abuses that occurred between 1960 and 1994.
- The Reparation and Rehabilitation Committee was charged with restoring victims' dignity and formulating proposals to assist with rehabilitation.
- The Amnesty Committee considered applications from individuals who applied for amnesty in accordance with the provisions of the Act.

== Process ==
Public hearings of the Human Rights Violations Committee and the Amnesty Committee were held at many venues around South Africa, including Cape Town (at the University of the Western Cape), Johannesburg (at the Central Methodist Mission), and Randburg (at the Rhema Bible Church).

The commission was empowered to grant amnesty to those who committed abuses during the apartheid era, as long as the crimes were politically motivated, proportionate, and there was full disclosure by the person seeking amnesty. To avoid victor's justice, no side was exempt from appearing before the commission. The commission heard reports of human rights violations and considered amnesty applications from all sides, from the apartheid state to the liberation forces, including the African National Congress.

=== Numbers ===
The Commission found that there were 7,000 political deaths under Apartheid between 1948 and 1989. 73 of these deaths were in detention while in the hands of the security police. More than 19,050 people had been victims of gross human rights violations. An additional 2,975 victims were identified through the applications for amnesty. In reporting these numbers, the Commission voiced its regret that there was very little overlap of victims between those seeking restitution and those seeking amnesty.

A total of 5,392 amnesty applications were refused, granting only 849 out of the 7,111 (which includes the number of additional categories, such as "withdrawn").

== Significance and impact ==
The TRC's emphasis on reconciliation was in sharp contrast to the approach taken by the Nuremberg trials and other de-Nazification measures. South Africa's first coalition government chose to pursue forgiveness over prosecution, and reparation over retaliation.

Opinions differ about the efficacy of the restorative justice method (as employed by the Truth and Reconciliation Commission) as compared to the retributive justice method, of which the Nuremberg trials are an example. In one survey study, the effectiveness of the TRC was measured on a variety of levels:

- Its usefulness in terms of confirming what had happened during the apartheid regime ("bringing out the truth")
- The feelings of reconciliation that could be linked to the Commission
- The positive effects (both domestically and internationally) that the Commission brought about (i.e. in the political and the economic environment of South Africa).

In the study by Orlando Lentini, the opinions of three ethnic groups were measured in this study: English-speaking White South Africans, the Afrikaners, and the Xhosa. According to the researchers, all of the participants perceived the TRC to be effective in bringing out the truth, but to varying degrees, depending on the group in question.

The differences in opinions about the effectiveness can be attributed to how each group viewed the proceedings. Some viewed them as not entirely accurate, as many people would lie in order to keep themselves out of trouble while receiving amnesty for their crimes. (The commission would grant amnesty to some with consideration given to the weight of the crimes committed.) Some said that the proceedings only helped to remind them of the horrors that had taken place in the past when they had been working to forget such things. Thus, the TRC's effectiveness in terms of achieving those very things within its title is still debatable.

=== Women in the TRC ===
Some analyses of the TRC have examined how gender shaped participation in the Commission’s processes. Seven of the seventeen TRC commissioners were women, and the Reparations and Rehabilitation Committee was chaired and co-chaired by Hlengiwe Mkhize and Wendy Orr. As witnesses, many women gave testimony about violations experienced by relatives. Relatives or dependents of those who suffered physical/mental injury and other violations were classified as victims under the TRC mandate. Scholars note that some women were reluctant to speak about abuses they personally experienced, especially sexual violence, due to social stigma.

In 1996, the University of Witwatersrand Center for Applied Legal Studies (CALS) made a submission, co-authored by Beth Goldblatt and Sheila Meintjies, urging the Commission to encourage women to share their own experiences. The TRC subsequently held three special hearings on women in Cape Town, Johannesburg and Durban. In the end, women accounted for more than half of the statements taken throughout the TRC, but less than half of those who reported on their own experience of direct human rights violations. Women were prominent in victim support groups. For example, 70% of the members of the large Khulumani Support Group were women.

== Media coverage ==
The hearings were initially set to be heard in camera, but the intervention of 23 non-governmental organisations eventually succeeded in gaining media access to the hearings. On 15 April 1996, the South African National Broadcaster televised the first two hours of the first human rights violation committee hearing live. With funding from the Norwegian government, radio continued to broadcast live throughout. Additional high-profile hearings, such as Winnie Mandela's testimony, were also televised live.

The rest of the hearings were presented on television each Sunday, from April 1996 to June 1998, in hour-long episodes of the Truth Commission Special Report. The programme was presented by progressive Afrikaner journalist Max du Preez, former editor of the Vrye Weekblad. The producers of the programme included Anneliese Burgess, Jann Turner, Benedict Motau, Gael Reagon, Rene Schiebe and Bronwyn Nicholson, a production assistant.

== In the arts and popular culture ==
=== Film ===
Various films have been made about the commission:

==== Documentary films ====
- Confronting the Truth (2006) by Steve York. Produced in association with the United States Institute of Peace.
- Facing the Truth (1999) by Bill Moyers. Two-part PBS series.
- Long Night's Journey into Day (2000) by Frances Reid. Won the Grand Jury Prize for best documentary at the Sundance Film Festival.

==== Feature films ====
- Forgiveness (2004) by Ian Gabriel. A South African feature film, starring South African–born actor Arnold Vosloo as a disgraced ex-cop seeking forgiveness from the family of the activist he killed under the apartheid regime. With Quanita Adams and Zane Meas.
- In My Country (2004). A feature film very loosely based on Country of My Skull, a 1998 autobiographical text by Antjie Krog that dealt with her coverage of the hearings. With Samuel L. Jackson and Juliette Binoche.
- Red Dust (2004). A feature film based on the novel of the same title by South African writer Gillian Slovo. With Hilary Swank, Jamie Bartlett and Chiwetel Ejiofor.
- Zulu Love Letter (2004). A film by Ramadan Suleman, starring Pamela Nomvete.
- The Forgiven (2018). A film by Roland Joffé, starring Forest Whitaker as Desmond Tutu and Eric Bana as Piet Blomfeld.

=== Theatre ===
Several plays have been produced about the TRC:

- Truth in Translation (2006), by Paavo Tom Tammi, in collaboration with American director, Michael Lessac and the company of Colonnades Theatre Lab, South Africa.
- Ubu and the Truth Commission (1997), by Jane Taylor and William Kentridge.
- Nothing but the Truth (2002), by John Kani.
- The Story I Am About to Tell, created in collaboration with the Khulumani support group.
- The Dead Wait, by Paul Herzberg.
- Truth and reconciliation, debbie tucker green (2011)
- Strange Courtesies San Jose Stagte Company (March 2021 )

=== Fiction ===
- Taylor, Jane. Ubu and the Truth Commission. Cape Town: University of Cape Town Press, 2007.
- Wicomb, Zoë. Playing in the Light, 2006.
- Slovo, Gillian. Red Dust. Virago ISBN 978-0-393-32399-3, 2000.
- Flanery, Patrick. Absolution. Atlantic Books, 2012.
- Krog, Antjie. Country of My Skull, 1998.

=== Poetry ===
- Some of Ingrid de Kok's poetry in Terrestrial Things (2002) deals with the TRC (e.g. "The Archbishop Chairs the First Session", "The Transcriber Speaks", "The Sound Engineer").

== Criticism ==
=== Justice and reconciliation ===
A 1998 study by South Africa's Centre for the Study of Violence and Reconciliation & the Khulumani Support Group, which surveyed several hundred victims of human rights abuse during the Apartheid era, found that most felt that the TRC had failed to achieve reconciliation between the black and white communities. Most believed that justice was a prerequisite for reconciliation rather than an alternative to it, and that the TRC had been weighted in favour of the perpetrators of abuse. (Note: As William Kentridge, director of Ubu and the Truth Commission, put it: "A full confession can bring amnesty and immunity from prosecution or civil procedures for the crimes committed. Therein lies the central irony of the Commission. As people give more and more evidence of the things they have done they get closer and closer to amnesty and it gets more and more intolerable that these people should be given amnesty.") The TRC’s mandate was limited to gross violations of human rights, defined in terms of physical or mental harm to an individual. The likes of Madeleine Fullard, Mamphela Ramphele and Beth Goldblatt have argued that this definition excludes systemic crimes such as forced removals, closing down schools and pass arrests. As a result of the TRC's shortcomings and the unaddressed injuries of many victims, victims' groups, together with NGOs and lawyers, took various TRC-related matters to South African and US courts in the early 2000s.

==== Amnesty ====
Many black South Africans were angered at amnesty being granted for human rights abuses committed by the apartheid government. The BBC described criticisms of the amnesty system as stemming from a "basic misunderstanding" about the TRC's mandate, which was to uncover the truth about past abuse, using amnesty as a mechanism, rather than to punish past crimes. Critics of the TRC dispute this, saying that their position is not a misunderstanding but a rejection of the TRC's mandate.

Among the highest-profile criticisms came from the family of prominent anti-apartheid activist Steve Biko, who was killed by the security police, and whose story was featured in the film Cry Freedom. Biko's family described the TRC as a "vehicle for political expediency", which "robbed" them of their right to justice. The family opposed amnesty for his killers on these grounds and brought a legal action in South Africa's highest court, arguing that the TRC was unconstitutional.

When the TRC drew to a close there were more than 300 cases of gross violations of human rights that remained unresolved. These cases concerned cases of abduction, disappearances, torture and murder and were committed by perpetrators who were not granted amnesty or who had not testified before the Commission. These cases were handed to the National Prosecuting Authority (NPA) for investigation and prosecution. Due to political interference in the work of the NPA, investigations were delayed and obstructed for twenty years. In 2017, after years of struggle on the part of the family of anti-apartheid activist, Ahmed Timol, the inquest into his death was re-opened. Timol died in police detention in 1971. The police claimed he had committed suicide but his family never accepted this finding. In a landmark verdict, on 12 October 2019, Judge Mothle overturned the finding of the apartheid-era inquest and found that Timol was murdered by the Security Police at John Vorster Square Police Station in Johannesburg. This case opened the way for the re-opening of further inquests.

==== Accountability for high-profile perpetrators ====
Former apartheid State President P.W. Botha defied a subpoena to appear before the commission, calling it a "circus". His defiance resulted in a fine and suspended sentence, but these were overturned on appeal. While former president F. W. de Klerk appeared before the commission and reiterated his apology for the suffering caused by apartheid, local reports at the time noted that he failed to accept that the former NP government's policies had given security forces a "licence to kill", although this was evidenced to him personally in different ways. de Klerk's appearance drove the chairman Archbishop Desmond Tutu almost to tears.

=== Reparations ===
The Reparations and Rehabilitations Committee recommended policy for how to assist victims (including family members and dependents) based on findings of other two committees. Several forms of reparations were recommended: urgent interim payments, individual reparation grants, symbolic reparation and legal administrative measures, community rehabilitation and institutional reforms. Wendy Orr, a co-chair of the Reparations and Rehabilitations Committee, has stated that delayed payments to victims in the reparations program are the most damaging aspect of the TRC’s work: Urgent Interim Reparations were made available in 2003, five years after the Commission recommended them to the government. Reparation grants were similarly delayed, and below the sum recommended by the TRC. In 2020 members of the Khulumani Galela Campaign, the majority of whom are elderly people who were physically injured during apartheid and who have not received compensation, began a series of protests outside of the Constitutional Court in Johannesburg. As of December 2025, these protests are ongoing.

=== Unequal influence ===
Playwright Jane Taylor, responsible for the acclaimed Ubu and the Truth Commission, found fault with the commission's lopsided influence:

The TRC is unquestionably a monumental process, the consequences of which will take years to unravel. For all its pervasive weight, however, it infiltrates our culture asymmetrically, unevenly across multiple sectors. Its place in small rural communities, for example, when it establishes itself in a local church hall, and absorbs substantial numbers of the population, is very different from its situation in large urban centres, where its presence is marginalised by other social and economic activities.

=== Testimony translation ===
Another dilemma facing the TRC was how to do justice to the testimonials of those witnesses for whom translation was necessary. It was believed that, with the great discrepancy between the emotions of the witnesses and those translating them, much of the impact was lost in interlingual rendition. A briefly tried solution was to have the translators mimic the witnesses' emotions, but this proved disastrous and was quickly scrapped.

== See also ==
- Civil Cooperation Bureau, an apartheid hit squad much discussed in the final TRC report
- Institute for Justice and Reconciliation
- Peace commission
- Reconciliation theology
- Restorative justice
- Transitional justice
- Truth commission

== Bibliography ==
=== Non-fiction ===
- Terry Bell, Dumisa Buhle Ntsebeza. 2003. "Unfinished Business: South Africa, Apartheid and Truth."
- Boraine, Alex. 2001. "A Country Unmasked: Inside South Africa's Truth and Reconciliation Commission."
- Cole, Catherine. 2010. "Performing South Africa's Truth Commission: Stages of Transition."
- Doxtader, Erik and Philippe-Joseph Salazar, Truth and Reconciliation in South Africa. The Fundamental Documents, Cape Town: New Africa Books/David Philip, 2008.
- Edelstein, Jillian. 2002. "Truth and Lies: Stories from the Truth and Reconciliation Commission in South Africa."
- Gobodo-Madikizela, Pumla. 2006. "A Human Being Died That Night: A South African Story of Forgiveness."
- Grunebaum, Heidi Peta. Memorializing the Past: Everyday Life in South Africa After the Truth and Reconciliation Commission. Piscataway, NJ: Transaction Publishers, 2011.
- Hayner, Priscilla. 2010. "Unspeakable Truths: Transitional Justice and the Challenge of Truth Commissions"
- Hendricks, Fred. 2003. "Fault-Lines in South African Democracy: Continuing Crisis of Inequality and Injustice."
- Kentridge, William. "Director's Note". In Ubu and the Truth Commission, by Jane Taylor, viii–xv. Cape Town: University of Cape Town Press, 2007.
- Kesselring, Rita. 2017. Bodies of Truth: Law, memory and emancipation in post-apartheid South Africa. Stanford University Press.
- Krog, Antjie. 2000. "Country of My Skull: Guilt, Sorrow, and the Limits of Forgiveness in the New South Africa."
- Martin, Arnaud. 2009. La mémoire et le pardon. Les commissions de la vérité et de la réconciliation en Amérique latine. Paris: L'Harmattan.
- Mack, Katherine. 2014. "From Apartheid to Democracy: Deliberating Truth and Reconciliation in South Africa."
- Moon, Claire. 2008. "Narrating Political Reconciliation: South Africa's Truth and Reconciliation Commission."
- Ross, Fiona. 2002. "Bearing Witness: Women and the Truth and Reconciliation Commission in South Africa."
- Tutu, Desmond. 2000. "No Future Without Forgiveness."
- Villa-Vicencio, Charles and Wilhelm Verwoerd. 2005. "Looking Back, Reaching Forward: Reflections on the Truth and Reconciliation Commission of South Africa."
- Wilson, Richard A. 2001. The Politics of Truth and Reconciliation in South Africa: legitimizing the post-apartheid state. Cambridge University Press. ISBN 978-0521001946
