= List of roles and awards of Adjoa Andoh =

British actress Adjoa Andoh has worked in several theatre, audio, radio, television, film, and video games productions since her professional debut in 1984.

== Film ==
Key
†	Denotes films that have not yet been released

Year	Title	Role	Notes
1991	London South West	Marion	Short film
1995	What My Mother Told Me	Jesse	
2008	Adulthood	Mrs Peel	
2009	Invictus	Brenda Mazibuko	
2012	In the Dark Half	Pathologist	
2013	Closed Circuit	News Reporter 2	
2015	The Healer	Office Worker	
2016	Brotherhood	Agnes Peel	
2016	Les Liaisons Dangereuses	Madame de Volanges	National Theatre Live
2019	Fractured	Dr. Jacobs	
2019	Brighton	Alice	
2020	The Lennox Report	Louise	Short film
2024	Wallace & Gromit: Vengeance Most Fowl	Judge	Voice role
2026	Merry Christmas Aubrey Flint	Janet	

== Television ==
Year	Title	Role	Notes
1990–1991	EastEnders	Karen	9 episodes
1992	Waiting for God	Angela Avery	Episode: "Sleeping Pills"
1992–2004	The Bill	Mrs Hughes, Diana Holt, Mrs Baptiste	3 episodes: "A Blind Eye", "Grey Area", "236"
1993, 2000–2003	Casualty	Maggie, Colette Kierney/Griffiths	73 episodes
1994	The Brittas Empire	Reporter	Episode: "High Noon"
1995	Health and Efficiency	Sister Beth Williams	2 episodes: "The Old Dope Peddler", "Five Have Plenty of Fun"
1995	The Tomorrow People	Amanda Jones	3 episodes
1995	Circles of Deceit: Dark Secret	Daniela	TV film
1996	Paul Merton in Galton and Simpson's…	Defence Counsel	Episode: "Twelve Angry Men"
1996	Testament: The Bible in Animation	Ruth	Voice; 1 episode
1996	Thief Takers	Mrs. Higgins	Episode: "Bad Blood"
1997	Peak Practice	Dr Nixon	2 episodes: "Letting Go", "The Price"
1998	Close Relations	April	Mini-Series
1998	The Adventures of Captain Pugwash	Toni	Voice; 3 episodes
1998	A Rather English Marriage	Mandy Hulme	TV film
1999	Jonathan Creek	Anthea Spacey	Episode: "The Curious Tale of Mr Spearfish"
2004	Every Time You Look at Me	Mrs. Berry	TV film
2005	Dalziel and Pascoe	Katie Bevins	2 episodes
2005	Chopratown	Abebe	TV film
2006	Doctor Who	Sister Jatt	Episode: "New Earth"
2007–2008	Doctor Who	Francine Jones	7 episodes: "Smith and Jones", "The Lazarus Experiment", "42", "The Sound of Drums", "Last of the Time Lords", "The Stolen Earth", "Journey's End"
2007	Wire in the Blood	Celeste Davies	Episode: "The Colour of Amber"
2007	The Shadow in the North	Jessie Saxon	TV film
2007–2020	Silent Witness	DI Nina Rosen / Dr. Lami Falase	4 episodes
2008	Mrs In-Betweeny	Ellen	TV film
2008–2011	M.I. High	Head of MI9	Recurring character
2009–2010	Missing	DCI Lauren Ford	3 episodes
2011	Scott & Bailey	Janice	Episode: "Execution"
2011–2014	Law & Order: UK	Lilly	Recurring character, 8 episode
2012	The Charles Dickens Show	Mary Seacole	Episode: "Health"
2012	Julius Caesar	Portia	TV film; Royal Shakespeare Company Live
2014	Wizards vs. Aliens	Old Bethesta	The two-part story "Daughters of Stone"
2014	Chasing Shadows	Angela Bale	4 episodes
2014	Grandpa in my Pocket	Nattie Scibbler	Episode: "The Magic of the Mill on the Marsh"
2014	The Life of Rock with Brian Pern	Doctor Foluke	Episode: "The Day of the Triffids"
2014	The Awakening	Madame Lebrun	5 episodes
2015	New Tricks	Alicia Whitechurch	Episode: "The Curate's Egg"
2015	Broadchurch	Julie	Episode: "#2.1"
2015	Cucumber	Marie	3 episodes
2015	The Interceptor	Anderson	Episode: "#1.1"
2015	River	Sunday Akentola	Episode: "#1.5"
2015–2020	Thunderbirds Are Go	Colonel Casey	Voice; recurring role
2016	Line of Duty	Prosecutor	2 episodes: "The Process", "Snake Pit"
2016	BBC Comedy Feeds	Mum	Episodes: "JPD"
2017	Acceptable Risk	Margaret Kroll	3 episodes
2017	Liar	Margaret Rust	3 episodes
2018	Death in Paradise	Celeste Jones	Episode: "Dark Memories"
2018	Julius Caesar	Casca	TV film; National Theatre Live
2020–present	Bridgerton	Lady Agatha Danbury	Main role; 32 episodes
2021	The Witcher	Nenneke	2 episodes
2022	The Smeds and The Smoos	Grandmother Smoo	Voice; TV film
2023	Mog's Christmas	Narrator	Voice; TV film
2023	The Real Crown: Inside the House of Windsor	Narrator	Voice
2023	Queen Charlotte: A Bridgerton Story	Lady Agatha Danbury	Main role; 6 Episodes
2024	The Red King	Lady Heather Nancarrow	Main role; 6 Episodes

== Theatre ==
Year	Title	Role	Director	Venue	Notes	Ref.
	Getting Through	Silk	Nona Sheppard	—N/a	International tour	
	The Murder of Jesus Christ	Mary	Steven Berkoff	3 Mills Studios		
	Crowned with Fame	Maimie	Sue Pomeroy	Swan Theatre		
	Our Day Out	Susan	Peter Oyston	Birimgham Repertory		
	Cloud Nine	Eileen / Mrs Saunders	Burt Caesar	Contact Theatre		
1987	Lear's Daughters	Regan	Gwenda Hughes		Woman's Theatre Group	
1987–1988	Glory!	Glory	Earl Warner	Lyric Theatre Hammersmith	Original cast	
1987–1988	Glory!	Glory	Earl Warner	Derby Playhouse		
1987–1988	Glory!	Glory	Earl Warner	West Yorkshire Playhouse		
1988–1989	Twice Over	Evaki	Nona Sheppard	Drill Hall		
1989–1990	The Snow Queen	The Story Teller	Karen Stephens	Young Vic		
1989–1990	Princhdice and Co.	Cleverlegs	Claire Groce	Cambridge Arts Theatre		
1992	The Odyssey	Helen of Troy / Eurycleia	Gregory Doran	The Other Place		
1993	Tamburlaine	Agydas	Terry Hands	Barbican Theatre		
1994	Love at a Loss	Lesbia	Polly Irvin	—N/a	National UK Tour	
1995	Death Catches The Hunter	Saratu	Polly Irvin	Traverse		
1998	Starstruck	Hope Gilby	Indhu Rubasingham	Tricycle Theatre		
1999	The Dispute	Carise	Neil Bartlett	—N/a	RSC Tour	
1999	The Dispute	Carise	Neil Bartlett	Lyric Theatre Hammersmith		
1999	A Streetcar Named Desire	Blanche	Deborah Yhip	National Studio		
2000	Breath Boom	Mother	Gemma Bodinez	Royal Court Theatre		
2002	The Vagina Monologues		Irina Brown	The Old Vic		
2003	Pericles	Dionyza	Neil Bartlett	Lyric Theatre Hammersmith		
2003–2004	In the Bunker with the Ladies	Minnie Horrocks	Nona Shephard	Drill Hall		
2004	Stuff Happens	Condoleezza Rice	Nicholas Hytner	Royal National Theatre		
2004–2005	His Dark Materials	Serafina Pekkala	Nicholas Hytner	Royal National Theatre		
2005	Blood Wedding	Criada	Rufus Norris	Almedia Theatre		
2006	Nights at the Circus	Princess	Emma Rice	Lyric Theatre Hammersmith		
2006	Sugar Mummies	Yolanda	Indhu Rubasingham	Royal Court Theatre		
2008	Purgatorio	Medea	Daniele Guerra	Arcola Theatre		
2008	The Revenger's Tragedy	The Duchess	Melly Still	Royal National Theatre		
2008	In the Red and Brown Water	Mama Moja / The Woman Who Reminds You	Walter Meirjohann	Young Vic		
2010	Joe Turner's Come and Gone	Bertha	David Lan	Young Vic		
2010	Or You Could Kiss Me	Woman	Neil Bartlett	Royal National Theatre		
2010	Or You Could Kiss Me	Woman	Neil Bartlett	Handspring Theatre		
2012	Julius Caesar	Portia	Gregory Doran	Royal Shakespeare Theatre		
2012	Julius Caesar	Portia	Gregory Doran	Noël Coward Theatre		
2012	Great Expectations	Miss Havisham	Neil Bartlett	Bristol Old Vic		
2015	A Wolf in Snakeskin Shoes	Peaches	Indhu Rubasingham	Tricycle Theatre		
2015–2016	Les Liaisons Dangereuses	Madame De Volanges	Josie Rourke	Donmar Warehouse		
2016	Soul	Alberta Gaye	James Dacre	Royal & Derngate Theatre		
2017	Assata Taught Me	Assata	Lynette Linton	The Gate Theatre		
2017	Assata Taught Me	Assata	Lynette Linton	Hackney Empire		
2018	Troilus and Cressida	Ulysses	Gregory Doran	Royal Shakespeare Theatre		
2018	Leave Taking	Mai	Madani Younis	Bush Theatre		
2018	Julius Caesar	Casca	Nicholas Hytner	Bridge Theatre		
2018	Julius Caesar	Casca	Nicholas Hytner	London Theatre Company		
2019	Richard II		Adjoa Andoh / Lynette Linton	Sam Wanamaker Playhouse		
2021	Girl on an Altar	Clytemnestra	Indhu Rubasingham	Kiln Theatre		
2023	Richard III	Richard III	Adjoa Andoh	Liverpool Playhouse		
2023	Richard III	Richard III	Adjoa Andoh	Rose Theatre		
2023	Bleak Expectations	The Narrator	Caroline Leslie	Criterion Theatre	Guest narrator	

== Video games ==
Year	Title	Role	Notes
2001	Wave Rally		
2004	Fable		
2005	Kameo	Lenya	
2008	Age of Conan		
2008	Fable II		
2010	Dante's Inferno	Various	
2010	Fable III		
2012	The Secret World	Zhara / AV	
2012	Fable: The Journey	The Temptress	
2014	Dreamfall Chapters	Shepherd / Mother Utana / Adala	
2017	Horizon Zero Dawn	Sona / Vandana Sarai	
2019	Doctor Who: The Edge of Time	The First	
2021	Doctor Who: The Edge of Reality	The First	

== Audio ==
Year	Title	Role	Notes
2006	Doctor Who: The Monthly Adventures	Nurse Albertine	Episode: "Year of the Pig"
2007–2021	Doctor Who: New Series Adventures	Narrator	8 episodes
2014	The Awakening	Madame Lebrun	BBC Radio 4
2016	Robert Louis Stevenson: Terror in the South Seas	Uma	BBC Radio 4
2017	Doctor Who: Classic Doctors New Monsters	Racnoss Empress	Episode: "Empire of the Racnoss"
2018	Tales from New Earth	Sister Jara	Episode: "The Cats of New Cairo"
2018	Torchwood One	Fiona	Episode: "The Law Machine"
2019–2020	The Archers	Fiona Lloyd	BBC Radio 4; 8 episodes
2022	Don't Mind: Cruxmont	Dr Gwendolyn Kingston	14 episodes

== Awards and nominations ==
Year	Award	Work	Category	Result	Ref.
2021	Screen Actors Guild Awards	Bridgerton	Outstanding Performance by an Ensemble in a Drama Series	Nominated	
2021	NAACP Image Awards	Bridgerton	Outstanding Supporting Actress in a Drama Series	Nominated	
2021	Black Reel TV Awards	Bridgerton	Outstanding Supporting Actress, Drama Seiries	Won	
2022	Black Reel TV Awards	Bridgerton	Outstanding Supporting Actress, Drama Seiries	Nominated	
2022	Odyssey Award	Emmanuel's Dream: The True Story of Emmanuel Ofosu Yeboah	N/A	Honored	
2023	NAACP Image Awards	Bridgerton	Outstanding Supporting Actress in a Drama Series	Nominated	
2024	NAACP Image Awards	Queen Charlotte: A Bridgerton Story	Outstanding Supporting Actress in a Drama Series	Pending	
2024	People's Choice Awards	Queen Charlotte: A Bridgerton Story	TV Performance of the Year	Nominated	
2024	Black Reel TV Awards	Queen Charlotte: A Bridgerton Story	Outstanding Supporting Performance in a Drama Series	Nominated	
