= The Dead Wait =

Play by Paul Herzberg

The Dead Wait is a play by Paul Herzberg which tells the tale of a young South African athlete, conscripted as a soldier in the Angolan Civil War, who tries to own up to a crime on arriving back home. Partly autobiographical, it draws on Herzberg's similar experiences prior to his leaving South Africa. It was aired for a spell on BBC Radio.

Although the play stems from and has its roots in the context of the Truth and Reconciliation Commission, it does not, unlike its coevals Ubu and the Truth Commission and The Story I Am About To Tell (with which it was shown at The Laboratory in Johannesburg's Market Theatre), embrace it directly. It is also, unlike the other two, built along traditional theatrical lines.

Audiences were generally and genuinely touched by the play. "A friend was deeply moved by the Dead Wait," recalled William Kentridge, "the play about the war in Angola. He had served as a soldier in that war."

The play was staged during Autumn of 2002 under the direction of Jacob Murray, at the Royal Exchange Theatre. The Dead Wait was nominated for Best New Play and production by the Manchester Evening News awards, and in 2002 it won Best Supporting Actor.
