= Duma Kumalo =

South African human rights activist (1958–2006)

Duma Joshua Kumalo (died 3 February 2006) was a South African human rights activist and one of the Sharpeville Six. He was condemned to death under the 1984 law of "common purpose", which allowed a person to be convicted for having been in the vicinity of an offence, without personally committing it. In 1988, he received a stay of execution the day before sentence was to be carried out. Following his release from jail in 1991, Kumalo became involved in many human rights activities, including discussions about the Truth and Reconciliation Commission and work with Amnesty International. He was a founder member of the Khulumani Support Group for victims of apartheid-related violence.

Kumalo also became involved in theatre and film projects as a way of telling his story and engaging others with human rights issues. His play The Story I Am About To Tell enjoyed huge success, running in South Africa and internationally for five years.

== Works ==
=== Theatre ===
- The Story I Am About to Tell
- He Left Quietly, with Yael Farber

=== Video ===
- Facing Death... Facing Life, documentary with Ingrid Gavshon

=== Miscellaneous ===
- The Bones Are Still Calling, with Seputla Sebogodi

Kumalo also contributed to Zulu Love Letter, by Ramadan Suleman and Bheki Pieterson.
