= The Story I Am About to Tell =

1997 South African play

The Story I Am About to Tell was a 1997 South African play by Bobby Rodwell. Produced by a support group for survivors giving testimony at the Truth and Reconciliation Commission, and starring three of them, it ran for five years both at home and abroad.

== Concept ==
The play was designed for travel around and between communities small and large to spread awareness about the commission and engage citizens in debate around the questions that it raised. The first of the three genuine TRC witnesses was the mother of a lawyer whose head had exploded after his boobytrapped Walkman detonated. Her testimony included a description of a hands-and-knees crawl into the room in which the bloodied mess of body and head remained. The second, a man, described his three years on death row, waiting to be hanged for a crime that he did not commit, while the third, a woman, recounted her arrest, interrogation and rape at the hands of security police.

These testimonies formed the central element of a play, set mostly in a chocker taxi on its way to a TRC hearing, that embraced manifold others. The three witnesses were supplemented by three professional actors who played small roles, offered comic relief and argued about the TRC's merits and proceedings.

== Reception ==
The Story I Am About To Tell featured alongside two other TRC-related productions, Ubu and the Truth Commission and The Dead Wait, at the Laboratory in Johannesburg's Market Theatre. William Kentridge, director of the former, held it in high regard but believed that it formed "only a partial solution to the questions raised by the Commission. Because what the 'real' people give is not the evidence itself, but performances of the evidence. There is a huge gap between the testimony at the Commission and its reperformance on stage. And these are not actors."

On the other hand, he continued, it was often precisely this awkward lack of professionalism on the part of the witnesses which lent their performances their power:

One is constantly thrown back, through their awkwardness, into realising these are the actual people who underwent the terrible things they are describing. The most moving moment for me was when one of the survivors (survivor of three years on death row) had a lapse of memory. How could he forget his own story — but of course he was in that moment a performer at a loss for his place in the script. I have no clear solution to the paradoxes this half testimony, half performance raised. But describe it as one of many possible ways of dealing with the material.

Following one performance, a German spectator found herself in desolate tears. They were not only for the witnesses and their heart-breaking narratives, she said, but also out of anger and regret: she had never in her life in Munich heard similar testimony about her own country's blighted history.

== See also ==
- Duma Kumalo
- Ubu and the Truth Commission
