= Fire Walker =

Public art sculpture in South Africa

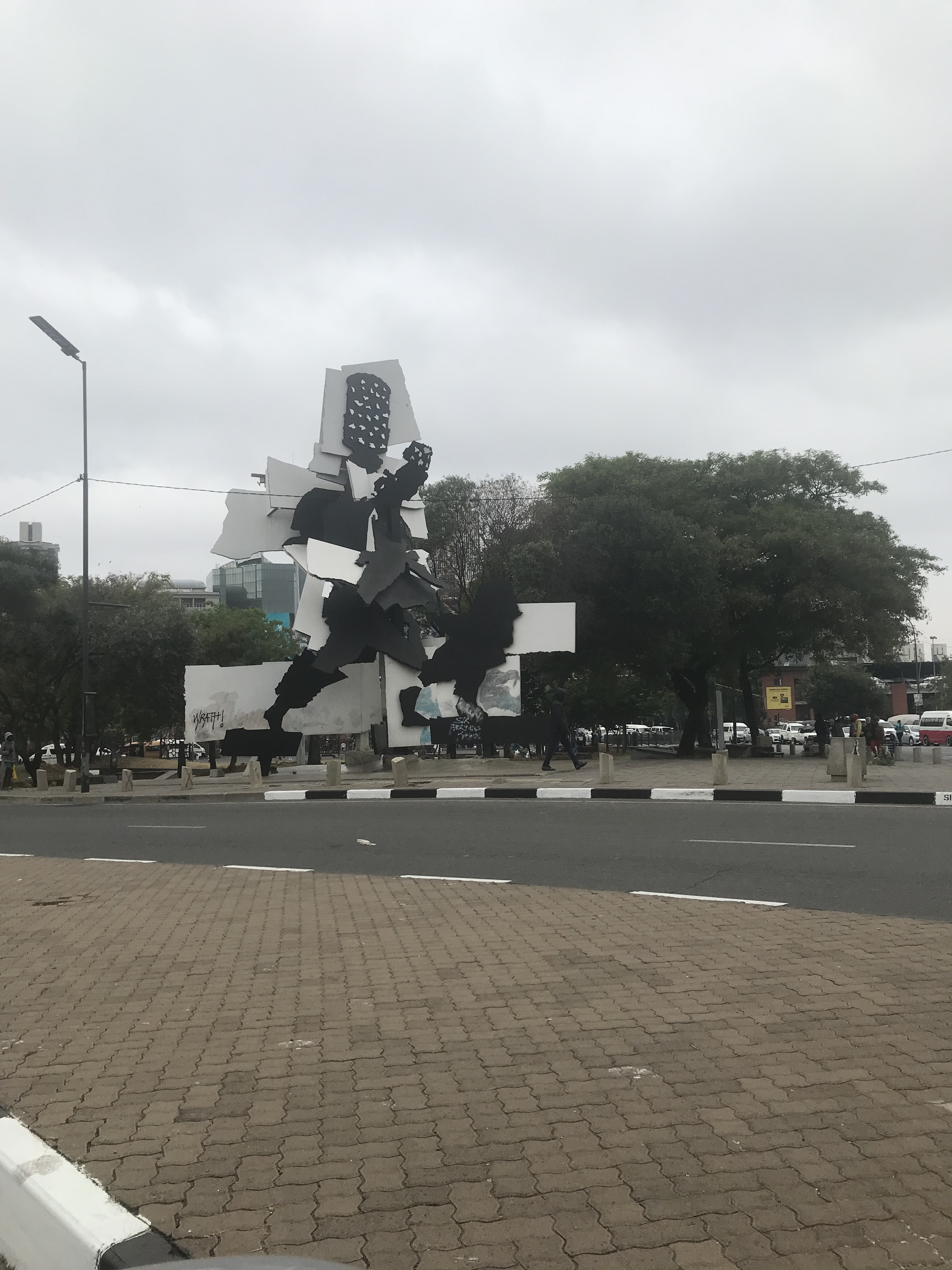
- The Fire Walker sculpture at the south end of the Queen Elizabeth bridge
- Artist: William Kentridge and Gerhard Marx
- Completion date: 2009
- Dimensions: 11 m (430 in)
- Location: Johannesburg
- 26°11′57.88″S 28°2′16.48″E

Fire Walker is a public art sculpture in South Africa, Johannesburg in the inner city. The piece is located on Sauer and Simmonds Street, off the Queen Elizabeth Bridge. The sculpture represents a woman carrying a brazier on her head in commemoration of the activity which took place in the area in recent years, when ladies would prepare and sell their fires to others preparing food in the surrounding areas.

Designed by William Kentridge and Gerhard Marx, the 10-metre-tall (33 ft) sculpture was constructed of fragmented steel pieces to create the feeling of the figure disintegrating or becoming reassembled, depending on the angle from which it is viewed, hinting at the fragility of spaces and the people who pass through them.

Fire Walker is one of many pieces found amongst Public Art in Johannesburg.

== Resources ==
- Jozi gets its Statue of Liberty
- Joburg unveils 11-m tall ‘fire walker’ steel sculpture
- Public Art Policy
- Public Art Gallery
