= Handspring Puppet Company =

South African puppetry company

- Type: Puppetry performance and scenic design
- Founded: 5 February 1981
- Founder: Adrian Kohler, Basil Jones, Jon Weinberg and Jill Joubert
- Headquarters: Cape Town, South Africa
- Key people: Adrian Kohler and Basil Jones
- Website: www.handspringpuppet.com

The Handspring Puppet Company is a South African puppetry performance and design company. It was established in 1981 by Adrian Kohler, Basil Jones, Jon Weinberg, and Jill Joubert, and is based in Cape Town, South Africa.

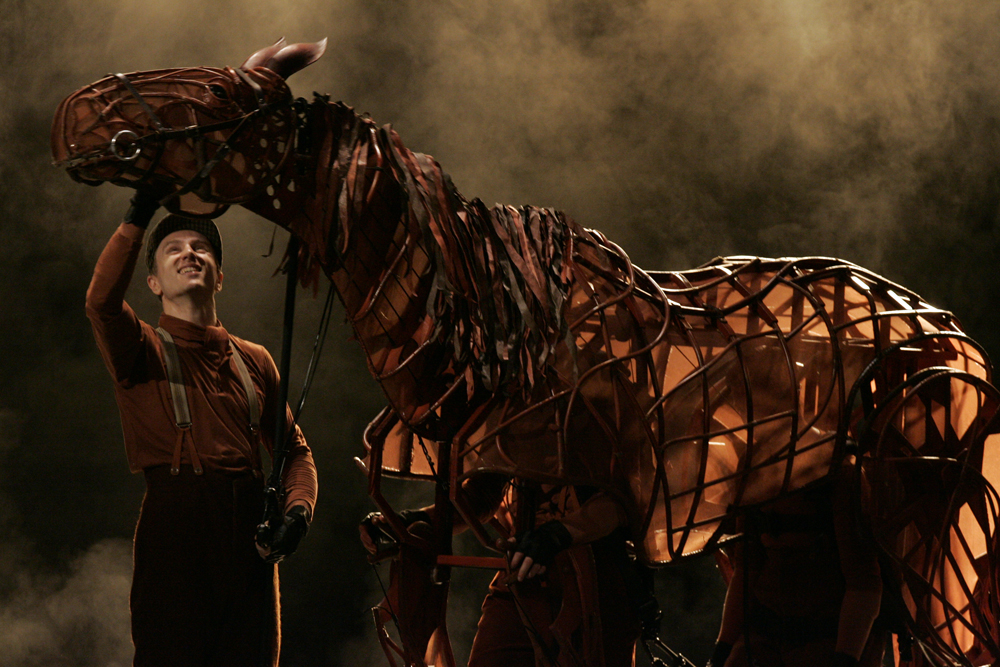
War Horse, a play seen by nearly eight million people, features horse puppets designed and created by Handspring Puppet Company and operated by three actors each.

== History ==
Jones and Kohler met at the Michaelis School of Fine Art in Cape Town. At first, they designed puppets for children-targeted productions, which Jones initially disliked. Kohler "introduced him [Jones] to the West African tradition of puppetry for adults," working with Malcolm Purkey and Barney Simon, among others.

== Productions ==
Some notable productions include:

=== Episodes of an Easter Rising ===
Esther van Ryswyk directed Episodes of an Easter Rising (1985), a play based on David Lytton's radio special of the same name. It told the story of two white lesbian women who became part of South Africa's anti-apartheid struggle. It premiered at the Baxter Theatre in Cape Town and toured to the National Arts Festival in Makhanda (formerly Grahamstown), WITS University Theatre in Johannesburg and to the 7th World Festival of Puppet Theatre in Charleville-Mézières, France.

=== Ubu and the Truth Commission ===
In 1997, they worked with William Kentridge (director) and Jane Taylor (scriptwriter) on Ubu and the Truth Commission. The play draws extensively on Alfred Jarry's absurdist production Ubu Roi (1896). It fuses the chaos of the Ubu legend with original testimony from witnesses at the post-apartheid Truth and Reconciliation Commission (TRC). It highlights Kentridge's work in the evolution of truth through a combination of fictional narratives and facts. The production premiered in Weimer, Germany on 17 June 1997. Over the next two years, it toured to 38 theatres in South Africa, Europe and the USA.

=== Tall Horse ===
Tall Horse (directed by Marthinus Basson in 2004) was a collaboration between the Sogolon Puppet Troupe of Mali and Handspring Puppet Company. The production was based on historical events: in 1827 the Pasha of Egypt, Muhammad Ali, sent a giraffe as a gift to King Charles X of France. The play dramatised the giraffe's journey across the Mediterranean Sea and the politics underlying it. With initial funding from the John F. Kennedy Centre in Washington, D.C, Tall Horse was also supported by Anglo Gold Ashanti, a mining company with interests in both Mali and South Africa.

=== War Horse ===
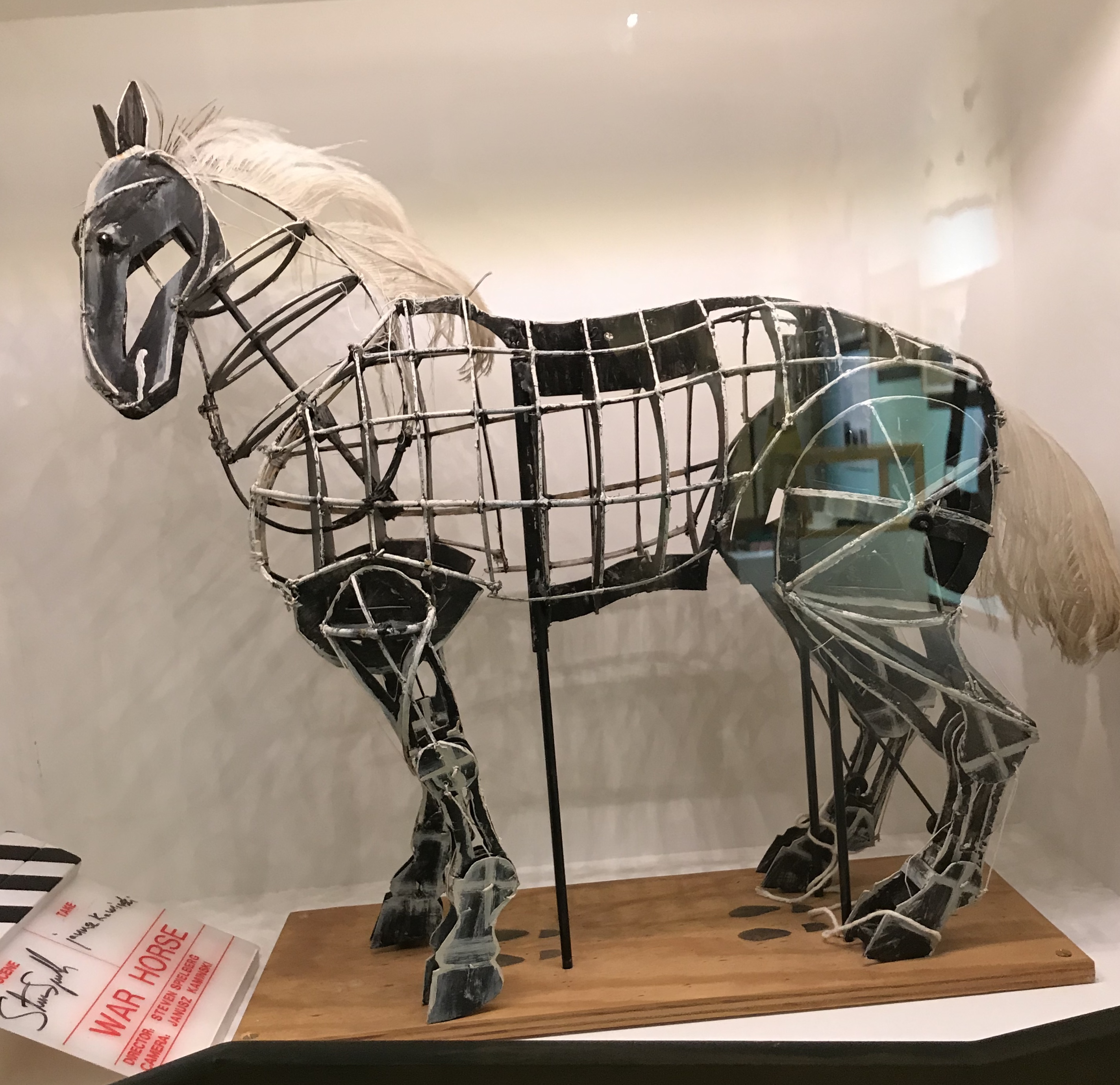
The maquette for the horse Joey from the National Theatre production. The puppets were made by the Handspring Puppet Company. This scale model was a gift to writer Sir Michael Morpurgo, author of War Horse.

The Handspring Puppet Company achieved critical acclaim when War Horse featuring life-size puppets they had created, premiered at the Royal National Theatre in South Bank, London, on 17 October 2007. Kohler and Jones worked with directors Marianne Elliott and Tom Morris and choreographer Toby Sedgwick to design and construct life-sized horse puppets, each controlled by three actors. Two actors operate the legs and a third controls the head and neck, with all three actors providing a variety of sound effects. The company won an Olivier Award, Evening Standard Theatre Award and Critics' Circle Theatre Award. The show transferred to the West End on 28 March 2009, and on 15 March 2011, it premiered on Broadway at the Vivian Beaumont Theater in New York City. The play has been performed globally to nearly eight million people worldwide.

=== Or You Could Kiss Me ===
The company collaborated with Neil Bartlett and Rae Smith on Or You Could Kiss Me, which opened at London's National Theatre on 5 October 2010, for a six-week season. The show has been described as "an intimate history of two very private lives, lived in extraordinary times". It was loosely based on the lives of Kohler and Jones, and speculated on their future circumstances when both men reach the age of 85.

== Exhibitions ==
- Unmasking the Puppet —1987 This exhibition opened at the UNISA Gallery in Pretoria and toured to the Johannesburg Art Gallery, the Durban Art Museum, the Tatham Art Gallery in Pietermaritzburg, and the South African National Gallery in Cape Town.
- Episodes 2001–2003 Presented in various venues across South Africa, this installation included puppets from seven productions created over 16 years. Episodes represented a retrospective of Handspring's work. The exhibition was sponsored by the Goodman Gallery.
- Patrimony 2004–2005 An exhibition of Bamana Puppets from Mali, featured puppets from the extensive family collection of Yaya Coulibali. It toured South Africa.
- At Arms Length – The Art of African Puppetry – 2006 Produced by the Museum for African Art (now known as The Africa Center, New York), this exhibit presented nearly 100 animated puppets, marionettes and puppet sculptures used in traditional and contemporary theatrical performances from Handspring and the Sogolon Puppet Troupe from Mali.
- The Puppet Show – 2008 Produced by the Institute of Contemporary Art, Philadelphia, USA at the Pennsylvania State University and the Frye Art Museum in Seattle. Here the kinetic work of leading contemporary artists was set off against a backdrop of more puppeteers from the world of professional theatre.
- KKNK National Art Festival – 2011 Selected as a featured visual artist for a solo exhibition at the Klein Karoo National Arts Festival, held annually in Oudtshoorn, South Africa, Handspring Puppet Company exhibited puppets featured in performances in the preceding 2 years that were in line for further international touring.
- National Theatre Gallery London – 2012 This exhibition explained the puppet-making process for War Horse.
- Circa Gallery, Johannesburg – 2016 An exhibition of Joey and Topthorn, characters from War Horse, together with portraits of puppets in the Handspring archives which Kohler had realised as editioned linocut prints.

== Awards ==
=== Theatrical Awards ===
2007 Evening Standard Awards

Best Design (Rae Smith and the Handspring Puppet Company, winner)

2007 Critics' Circle Theatre Awards

Best Designer (Basil Jones, Adrian Kohler, Rae Smith and the Handspring Puppet Company, winner)

2008 Laurence Olivier Awards

Best Set Design (Rae Smith, Basil Jones and Adrian Kohler, winner)

2011 Tony Awards

Adrian Kohler and Basil Jones won the Special Tony Award for War Horse.

2011 Outer Critics Circle Awards

Outer Critics Circle Special Achievement Award for "Puppet Design, Fabrication and Direction for War Horse"

=== Honorary Awards ===
2012 – Honorary Doctorate of Literature Kohler and Jones both received an honorary doctorate in literature from the University of Cape Town, South Africa.

2018 – John F. Kennedy Gold Medal Kohler and Jones received the John F. Kennedy Gold Medal in the Arts from the Kennedy Center International Committee on the Arts at a ceremony held at the Zeitz Museum of Contemporary Art Africa.

== Production Schedule ==
Schedule for productions featuring puppets created by Handspring Puppet Company
Title		Year/s	Country	Cities
Episodes of an Easter Rising		1985	South Africa	Cape Town, Makhanda (formerly Grahamstown), Johannesburg
Episodes of an Easter Rising		1985	France	Charleville-Mézières
A Midsummer Night's Dream		1988–1989	South Africa	Stellenbosch, Cape Town, Makhanda, Johannesburg
Carnival of the Bear		1988	South Africa	Johannesburg
Tooth and Nail		1989	South Africa	Johannesburg
Starbrites!		1990–91	South Africa	Johannesburg
Starbrites!		1990–91	United Kingdom	Cambridge, Oxford, Birmingham, Nottingham, London
Starbrites!		1990–91	Ireland	Dublin
Starbrites!		1990–91	Denmark	Copenhagen
Woyzeck on the Highveld		1992–2009	South Africa	Makhanda, Johannesburg, Cape Town
Woyzeck on the Highveld		1992–2009	Germany	Munich, Stuttgart, Hamburg, Bochum, Braunschweig, Berlin
Woyzeck on the Highveld		1992–2009	Belgium	Antwerp, Brussels
Woyzeck on the Highveld		1992–2009	Switzerland	Fribourg, Basel, Zurich
Woyzeck on the Highveld		1992–2009	United Kingdom	Leeds, Glasgow
Woyzeck on the Highveld		1992–2009	Canada	Toronto
Woyzeck on the Highveld		1992–2009	Spain	Granada, Girona
Woyzeck on the Highveld		1992–2009	Sweden	Gothenburg
Woyzeck on the Highveld		1992–2009	USA	New York, Chicago
Woyzeck on the Highveld		1992–2009	China	Hong Kong
Woyzeck on the Highveld		1992–2009	Australia	Adelaide, Perth, Brisbane
Woyzeck on the Highveld		1992–2009	New Zealand	Wellington
Woyzeck on the Highveld		1992–2009	Colombia	Bogotá
Woyzeck on the Highveld		1992–2009	Israel	Jerusalem
Woyzeck on the Highveld		1992–2009	France	Avignon, Paris, Châlons
Woyzeck on the Highveld		1992–2009	Norway	Stavanger
Woyzeck on the Highveld		1992–2009	Italy	Rome
Woyzeck on the Highveld		1992–2009	Poland	Wroclaw
Faustus in Africa		1995–1997	Germany	Weimar, Berlin, Stuttgart, Munich, Hannover, Remscheid, Gütersloh, Erlangen, Bochum, Ellwangen, Hamburg, Strasbourg
Faustus in Africa		1995–1997	South Africa	Makhanda, Johannesburg
Faustus in Africa		1995–1997	Switzerland	Zurich, Basel
Faustus in Africa		1995–1997	Czech Republic	Prague
Faustus in Africa		1995–1997	United Kingdom	London
Faustus in Africa		1995–1997	Portugal	Lisbon
Faustus in Africa		1995–1997	Australia	Adelaide
Faustus in Africa		1995–1997	Belgium	Brussels
Faustus in Africa		1995–1997	France	Dijon, Avignon, Marseilles, Tarbes, Toulouse, Paris, Sochaux, Bourg—en-Bresse, Chambéry
Faustus in Africa		1995–1997	Israel	Jerusalem
Faustus in Africa		1995–1997	Denmark	Copenhagen
Faustus in Africa		1995–1997	Austria	St. Pölten
Faustus in Africa		1995–1997	Italy	Polverigi, Rome
Faustus in Africa		1995–1997	Spain	Seville
Faustus in Africa		1995–1997	USA	Washington, Chicago, Springfield, Northampton
Ubu and the Truth Commission		1997–1999	Germany	Weimar, Hannover, Ludwigsburg, Erlangen, Munich, Wiesbaden
Ubu and the Truth Commission		1997–1999	South Africa	Makhanda, Johannesburg, Stellenbosch
Ubu and the Truth Commission		1997–1999	France	Avignon, Rungis, Nantes, Dijon, Toulouse, Paris, Lannion, Saint-Brieuc, Vannes, Quimper, Amiens
Ubu and the Truth Commission		1997–1999	Switzerland	Zurich, Geneva, Basel, Neuchâtel
Ubu and the Truth Commission		1997–1999	Norway	Kristiansand
Ubu and the Truth Commission		1997–1999	USA	New York, Washington, Los Angeles
Ubu and the Truth Commission		1997–1999	Belgium	Antwerp
Ubu and the Truth Commission		1997–1999	Sweden	Stockholm, Göteborg
Ubu and the Truth Commission		1997–1999	Denmark	Copenhagen, Randers
Ubu and the Truth Commission		1997–1999	Czech Republic	Prague
Ubu and the Truth Commission		1997–1999	Italy	Rome, Reggio Emilia
Ubu and the Truth Commission		1997–1999	Netherlands	Rotterdam
Ubu and the Truth Commission		1997–1999	Réunion Island	Saint-Denis
Ubu and the Truth Commission		1997–1999	United Kingdom	London
Il Ritorno d'Ulisse		1998–2023	Belgium	Brussels
Il Ritorno d'Ulisse		1998–2023	Austria	Vienna
Il Ritorno d'Ulisse		1998–2023	Germany	Berlin, Potsdam
Il Ritorno d'Ulisse		1998–2023	Netherlands	Amsterdam
Il Ritorno d'Ulisse		1998–2023	Switzerland	Zurich
Il Ritorno d'Ulisse		1998–2023	South Africa	Makhanda, Pretoria
Il Ritorno d'Ulisse		1998–2023	Portugal	Lisbon
Il Ritorno d'Ulisse		1998–2023	USA	New York, Seattle, San Francisco
Il Ritorno d'Ulisse		1998–2023	France	Caen, Besançon, Nîmes, Toulouse, Lyon, Vichy, Versailles
Il Ritorno d'Ulisse		1998–2023	Luxembourg	Luxembourg
Il Ritorno d'Ulisse		1998–2023	Australia	Melbourne
Il Ritorno d'Ulisse		1998–2023	Italy	Venice, Palermo
Il Ritorno d'Ulisse		1998–2023	Spain	Girona
Il Ritorno d'Ulisse		1998–2023	United Kingdom	Edinburgh
Il Ritorno d'Ulisse		1998–2023	South Korea	Gwangju
Il Ritorno d'Ulisse		1998–2023	China	Hong Kong
The Chimp Project		2000	Germany	Hannover, Recklinghausen, Weimar, Munich, Nuremberg
The Chimp Project		2000	South Africa	Makhanda, Johannesburg, Cape Town
The Chimp Project		2000	Switzerland	Basel
The Chimp Project		2000	France	Paris
The Chimp Project		2000	Réunion Island	Saint-Denis
Zeno at 4 am		2001	Belgium	Brussels
Zeno at 4 am		2001	France	Paris, Angoulême, Toulouse, Amiens
Zeno at 4 am		2001	USA	Minneapolis, Chicago, New York
Confessions of Zeno		2002–2003	Belgium	Brussels
Confessions of Zeno		2002–2003	Germany	Kassel, Frankfurt, Berlin, Hamburg
Confessions of Zeno		2002–2003	Croatia	Zagreb
Confessions of Zeno		2002–2003	South Africa	Makhanda, Stellenbosch
Confessions of Zeno		2002–2003	Italy	Rome
Confessions of Zeno		2002–2003	Spain	Salamanca
Confessions of Zeno		2002–2003	France	Paris, Caen, Angoulême
Confessions of Zeno		2002–2003	Singapore	Singapore
Confessions of Zeno		2002–2003	Canary Islands	Las Palmas
Confessions of Zeno		2002–2003	Portugal	Lisbon
Confessions of Zeno		2002–2003	Spain	Vitoria
Tall Horse		2007–2009	South Africa	Cape Town, Pretoria, Johannesburg
Tall Horse		2007–2009	Germany	Stuttgart
Tall Horse		2007–2009	USA	Williamstown, New York, Pittsburgh, Ann Arbor, Chapel Hill, Washington DC
War Horse (play)	National Theatre Production	2009-2016	United Kingdom	London
War Horse (play)	West End Production	2011–2013	United Kingdom	London
War Horse (play)	Broadway Production	2012–2013	USA	New York
War Horse (play)	Toronto Production	2012–2014	Canada	Toronto
War Horse (play)	US National Tour	2012–2014	USA/ Japan	Launched in Los Angeles, it toured 29 cities, ending in Tokyo, Japan
War Horse (play)	Australian Tour	2013–2014	Australia	Melbourne, Sydney, Brisbane
War Horse (play)	First UK National Tour	2013–2014	United Kingdom	Plymouth, Birmingham, Salford Quays, Edinburgh, Southampton, Dublin, Sunderland, Cardiff
War Horse (play)	Berlin, Germany	2014–2015	Germany	Berlin
War Horse (play)	Netherlands	2014–2015	Netherlands	Amsterdam, Rotterdam, Breda, Groningen, Apeldoorn and Heerlen
War Horse (play)	South Africa	2015–16	South Africa	Johannesburg, Cape Town
War Horse (play)	China	2017–present		Beijing, Shanghai, Guangzhou, Heilongjiang Tianjin.
War Horse (play)	10th Anniversary Tour	2017–present	China	Canterbury, Bristol, Liverpool, Oxford, Brighton , Bradford, Nottingham, Edinburgh, Southampton, Salford, Cardiff , Woking, Plymouth, Milton Keynes, Birmingham, London, Glasgow, Sunderland , Stoke-on-Trent, Dublin, Liverpool, Leicester, London
Or You Could Kiss Me		2010	United Kingdom	London
Little Amal, The Walk		2021	Europe and United Kingdom	65 towns and cities in Turkey, Greece, Italy, France, Switzerland, Germany, Belgium and United Kingdom.
