= The Seven Sacraments of Nicolas Poussin =

Play by Neil Bartlett

The Seven Sacraments of Nicolas Poussin is a play by Neil Bartlett inspired by the Seven Sacraments series of paintings by Nicolas Poussin. It was first performed in a lecture theatre inside of the Royal London Hospital. It was commissioned in 1997 by Artangel.
