= Truth in Translation =

Truth in Translation is a stage play conceived and directed by Michael Lessac, with music by Hugh Masekela. It tells the story of the interpreters at South Africa's Truth and Reconciliation Commission.

The play was written in a collaboration between the interpreters who worked at the TRC, writer Paavo Tom Tammi and the company of South African actors. It premiered in Rwanda, has toured South Africa and is touring to international conflict zones such as Northern Ireland, Sierra Leone, the Balkans, Jerusalem/Ramallah, Sri Lanka, Peru, and Indonesia/Timor to tell the story of the South African experience. The project includes workshops with audiences, exhibitions (The Forgiveness Project and Jillian Edelstein's Truth and Lies) and filming of the interaction between audiences and the company, and attempts to provoke a global dialogue around notions of healing and reconciliation.
