= Gerhard Marx =

South African artist (born 1976)

- Born: 1976 (age 48–49)
- Citizenship: South Africa
- Education: University of Cape Town (M.FA.)
- Occupation: Artist

Gerhard Marx (born 1976) is a South African artist.

== Biography ==
Born in 1976, he completed his master's degree in Fine Arts cum laude at the University of Cape Town in 2004. He has worked with well-known artists such as William Kentridge and the Handspring Puppet Company

He currently teaches at the University of the Witwatersrand, in Johannesburg.

== Works ==
- The theatre piece Tshepang (Gerhard Marx - co director, Lara Foot-Newton – director) was chosen as one of the twelve feature film projects for January 2007 Screenwriters Lab by the Sundance Institute.
- The play “Hear and Now” was presented at the Baxter Theatre Centre during 2005.

== Controversy ==
According to Art News South Africa of April 2006, Marx considered legal action against BMW shortly after an ad campaign created by agency Ireland-Davenport allegedly infringed on his copyright. Art News South Africa reproduced both the controversial ad – removed from circulation after a short run, and a close-up of Marx's work. His agent, Warren Siebrits had already confirmed in March 2006 that Marx will be represented by the copyright lawyer Owen Dean, better known for The Lion Sleeps Tonight case.
