= Confronting the Truth =

Documentary film by Steve Yor

Confronting the Truth is a documentary film by Steve York about truth and reconciliation commissions and how they work. The film focuses on the past commissions in South Africa, Peru, East Timor, and Morocco. The film was produced for the United States Institute of Peace (USIP) and includes interviews with a number of people involved in transitional justice, the process of fairly confronting the legacy of past crimes committed during armed conflict, including Nobel Peace Prize winners Archbishop Desmond Tutu and Jose Ramos Horta.

USIP screened Confronting the Truth as part of its Rule of Law program in Iraq, where it hopes to generate understanding and spark public dialogue on the usefulness of the truth commission process. It has distributed some 440 DVDs of the Arabic and Kurdish language versions of the film in Iraq.

USIP also screened the film in Nepal, where it organized a series of roundtable discussions from 10 to 17 July 2007 to discuss transitional justice options pursued by other countries after conflict. Each roundtable included a presentation of various mechanisms to address past abuses, the presentation of Confronting the Truth, and a discussion on the prospects for transitional justice in Nepal. USIP officials met with representative groups from civil society, victims of the multi-year armed conflict, the media, and government and political party representatives. The sessions took place in Nepal's capital city of Kathmandu, as well as in Banke, Bardiya, and Dang Districts in the mid-western region, the most affected region during the conflict.

USIP also used the film in its civil society workshops in Sudan.

The film screened as part of the Search for Common Ground Film Series at the United Nations. Harvard University showed it in 2008 as part of its Program on Negotiation.

== See also ==
- Truth and Reconciliation Commission (South Africa)
