= Zulu Love Letter =

- Directed by: Ramadan Suleman
- Screenplay by: Ramadan Suleman, Bhekizizwe Peterson
- Produced by: JBA Production
- Starring: Pamela Nomvete Marimbe, Mpumi Malatsi, Sophie Mgcina, Kurt Egelhof
- Cinematography: Manuel Teran
- Edited by: Jacques Comets
- Music by: Zim Ngqawana
- Release date: 2004
- Running time: 105'
- Countries: France; Germany; South Africa

Zulu Love Letter is a 2004 film.

== Synopsis ==
Thandeka, a young Black journalist, lives in fear of Johannesburg's past. She's so troubled that she can't work, and her relationship with her 13-year-old deaf daughter Mangi goes from bad to worse. One day Me'Tau, an elderly woman, arrives at the newspaper's office. Ten years earlier, Thandeka witnessed the murder of Me'Tau's daughter Dinéo by the secret police. Me'Tau wants Thandeka to find the murderers and Dinéo's body so that the girl can be buried in accordance with tradition. What Me'Tau couldn't know is that Thandeka has already paid for her knowledge, for having dared stand up to the apartheid system run by the whites. Meanwhile, Mangi secretly prepares a Zulu love letter: four embroidered images representing solitude, loss, hope, and love, as a final gesture towards her mother so that she won't give up the fight. The events take place during the TRC.

Zulu Love Letter tells the tale of two mothers looking for their daughters against the backdrop of South Africa's first successful democratic elections and the establishment of the Truth and Reconciliation Commission. Thandeka Khumalo faces the task of reconciling with her estranged thirteen-year-old daughter, Simangaliso, who grew up with Thandeka's grandparents due to Thandeka's job and political responsibilities. Thandeka is struggling to adjust to the changes around her, tormented by a sense of shame and anguish that will not go away. When ghosts from her past reappear, her melancholy soul is forced to confront her experiences of detention and torture. The mother of the young activist whose murder Thandeka saw and reported requests Thandeka's assistance in finding Dineo's body so that she might be given an appropriate burial. The psychic demons that haunt the present must be identified and banished in order for grieving to end and for healing to occur.

== Awards ==
Awards
Mons 2005	Ramadan Suleman	Grand prize	Won
Mar del Plata International Film Festival 2006	Ramadan Suleman	'Red de Cine de Derechos Humanos' Award	Won
Ouagadougou Panafrican Film and Television Festival 2005	Pamela Nomvete	Best actress	Won
Venice Film Festival	Ramadan Suleman	Best film	Nominated
South African Film and Television Awards	Ramadan Suleman	Best Achievement in Directing - Feature Film	Nominated
South African Film and Television Awards	Pamela Nomvete	Best actress	Nominated
South African Film and Television Awards	Best Feature Film		Nominated
Angers 2005
Cape Town World Cinema 2005
Cartago 2004

== Cast ==
- Pamela Nomvete as Thandi (Thandeka Khumalo)
- Mpumi Malatsi as Mangi
- Kurt Egelhof as Moola
- Sophie Mgcina as Me'Tau
- Connie Mfuku as Ma'Khumalo
- Patrick Ndlovu as Bab'Khumalo
- Hugh Masebenza as Bouda'D
- Richard Nzimande as Mike Peters
- Patrick Shai as Khubeka
- David Butler as Green
- Samson Khumalo as Dhlamini

== Influence on up coming film makers ==
The investigation of personal and societal healing in the wake of apartheid in Zulu Love Letter has influenced later filmmakers to take on related subjects in their work. The movie serves as an illustration of how effectively social commentary and cultural preservation can be accomplished through cinema.

== Preservation of culture ==
Zulu Love Letter emphasizes the need of protecting and honoring ancient African artistic genres like the beaded "Zulu love letters." Director Ramadan Suleman stressed the relevance of African ancestry in the broader framework of South African history and identity by infusing these cultural components throughout the movie.

== Critical Responses ==
The film received a largely favorable critical reception after its release. The film's subtle examination of post-apartheid South Africa and the emotional challenges people endure in the wake of institutionalized racism and violence won accolades from critics. Additionally praised were the film's compelling plot and strong character development, with a special focus on the portrayal of strong female characters who defy social expectations.

== International Recognition ==
Through its participation in a number of film festivals, including the Toronto International Film Festival, Zulu Love Letter attracted attention on a global scale. This exposure encouraged a greater comprehension of South Africa's past and current issues as well as helped introduce worldwide audiences to the nuances of post-apartheid South Africa.

== Impact and legacy ==
Zulu love letter also addresses emotional significance faced by the nation in the after math of the apartheid. The film's legacy contributes to post apartheid narratives with representation of strong female characters who are trying to preserve the Zulu culture by demonstrating issues of guilt, trauma and reconciliation. The film helped light a path that was deeper in the understanding of South Africa's story towards healing and having national unity.

== Release date ==
Zulu love letter premiered on September, 08, 2004 in the Venice Film Festival where it was given a nomination for the best film award. It was released in South Africa on August 5, 2005 and in France to domestic audiences on April 19, 2006.

== Sources ==
- African Film Festival of Cordoba-FCAT (license CC BY-SA-3.0)
