= Or You Could Kiss Me =

2010 play by Neil Bartlett

- Written by: Neil Bartlett
- Original language: English
- Genre: Drama; Puppetry
- Setting: Port Elizabeth

Premiere
- Date premiered: 5 October 2010
- Place premiered: Royal National Theatre, London

Or You Could Kiss Me is a play by Neil Bartlett and Handspring Puppet Company. It received its world première at the National Theatre's Cottesloe venue on 5 October 2010 following previews from 28 September 2010, and played a limited season until 18 November 2010.

== Cast ==
- Adjoa Andoh
- Finn Caldwell
- Basil Jones
- Adrian Kohler
- Craig Leo
- Tommy Luther
- Mervyn Millar
