= Paul Herzberg =

South African actor and playwright

- Born: 1953 (age 72–73); Cape Town

Paul Herzberg (born 1953) is a South African actor and writer, known for The Honourable Woman (2014), Black Earth Rising (2019), My Week with Marilyn (2011), Room 36 (2005), Blood and Cry Freedom (1987).

== Early life ==
Born in Cape Town, Herzberg studied acting at the University of Cape Town drama school and scriptwriting at the College for Advanced Technical Education in Pretoria. He moved to the UK in 1976, after having served as a conscripted soldier on the Namibian border, during the period of the Angolan war. He then studied at the London Academy of Music and Dramatic Art.

== Career ==
As an actor, his film and television appearances include Smiley's People, Agatha Christie's Poirot - Dumb Witness and The Life and Loves of a She-Devil. He co-wrote and starred in the feature film, Almost Heaven which won the Nashville International Best Feature Award.

On stage, he played Stanley Kowalski in A Streetcar Named Desire at the Mermaid Theatre. He is a regular at Manchester's Royal Exchange where his roles have included Bluntschli in Arms And The Man, Shorty in People Are Living There, Colbert in While The Sun Shines, Captain Papa Louw in his award-winning play The Dead Wait and recently as Capulet in Romeo and Juliet. He has appeared twice at the Chichester Festival theatre, first as Gratiano in The Merchant of Venice (with Sir Alec Guinness as Shylock); and then in Carrington, as Mark Gertler. He was in the world premiere of Dancing At Lughnasa in the role of Gerry Evans at the Abbey Theatre in Dublin (1990). In 2003, he played John Vorster in Sir Antony Sher's play I.D. at the Almeida theatre. He was cast as Shylock in The Merchant Of Venice at the Arcola in 2007. He joined the RSC at Stratford for The Taming Of The Shrew in which he played Vincentio (2012). The following year he play Loonie Schutzmacher in Shaw's The Doctor's Dilemma at the National Theatre. He returned to the National in the roles of Yair Hirshfeld and Shimon Peres in Oslo which transferred to the Harold Pinter Theatre.

Herzberg first began writing for BBC Radio in 1992 with the 60 minute play The Song Of My Father; followed by several plays and short stories. His short radio play Where's The Bull?, won the London Radio playwright's festival in 1992 and was broadcast on LBC Radio.

His stage play The Dead Wait is based on the story of a young South African athlete who is a conscripted soldier in the Angolan Civil War and was shortlisted for the Verity Bargate Award in 1997. The story also reflects Herzberg's own experiences as a conscripted soldier before leaving South Africa. The Dead Wait was broadcast on BBC Radio and received its theatrical world premiere' at the Barney Simon Theatre at the Market, in 1997. In 2002 it received its British premiere' at the Royal Exchange in Manchester, with Herzberg in the role of Captain Papa Louw, where it was nominated for three Manchester Evenings News Awards (best new play, production and actor) winning in the last category. The play was published by Oberon books. In 2013, it was produced by The Park Theatre.

== Personal life ==
Herzberg has been married to Oona Kirsch since 1988. They have two children. His godson is Pretty Little Liars actor Julian Morris.

== Selected film and television roles ==
- Black Earth Rising, (2019) - as Zava Zand
- The Honourable Woman, (2014) - as Daniel Borgoraz
- Papadopolous & Sons, (2012) - as Nikolas
- Almost Heaven, (2005) - as Blagden
- The Dirty Dozen: Next Mission, (1985) - as Private Reynolds
- Murder City, "Just Seventeen" (2006) - as Max Edwards
- Heartbeat, Music of the Spheres (2003) - as Marek Starosta
- The Inspector Lynley Mysteries, "Well Schooled in Murder" (2002) - as Barry Summers
- The Famous Five, "Five Have a Mystery to Solve" (1996) - Emilio
- Agatha Christie's Poirot - "Dumb Witness" (1996) - as Jacob Tanios
- Soldier Soldier, "Staying Together" (1993) - as Kurt
- Lovejoy, "Benin Bronze" (1992) - as Andre
- Cry Freedom (1987) - as Beukes
- Smiley's People (1982) (mini) - as Villem Craven
- The Professionals, "Mixed Doubles" (1980) - as Serpoy
- Tales of the Unexpected - "Neck" (1979) - as John Bannister
- Tales of the Unexpected - "A Time to Die" episode (1988) - as Henri
- Wild Discovery - Narrator

== Selected theatre roles ==
- Arms And The Man (1989) - as Bluntschli, Royal Exchange Theatre
- A Streetcar Named Desire (1984) - as Stanley Kowalski, Mermaid Theatre
- The Merchant Of Venice (1984) - as Gratiano, Chichester Festival Theatre
- Carrington (1993) - as Mark Gertler, Chichester Festival Theatre
- Dancing At Lughnasa (1990) - as Gerry Evans, Abbey Theatre, Dublin
- I.D. (2003) - as John Vorster, Almeida
- The Merchant Of Venice (2007) - as Shylock, Arcola
- Taming Of The Shrew (2012) - as Vincentio, Royal Shakespeare Company.
- The Doctor's Dilemma (2012) - as Schutzmacher, National Theatre.
- Oslo (2017) - as Yair Hirshfeld and Shimon Peres, National Theatre.

== Selected writing ==
- Sweet LIke Suga - (1981/2) Old Red Lion, Centaur Montreal, Theatre 2000 Ottawa, stage play
- The Song Of My father - (1992) BBC Radio 4 60 minute play
- The Crackwalker - (1993) BBC Radio 4 short story
- Where's The Bull? - (1993) LBC Winner London Radio Playwrights Festival
- Dreaming Up Laura - (1995) BBC Radio 4 90 minute play
- The Dead Wait - (2002) Royal Exchange Theatre, stage play
- Almost Heaven - (2005) Feature Film (co-wrote)
