= Jane Taylor (South African writer) =

South African writer, playwright and academic

Jane Taylor (19 April 1956 - 6 September 2023) was a South African writer, playwright and academic. She held the Andrew W. Mellon Chair of Aesthetic Theory and Material Performance at the Centre for Humanities Research (CHR) at the University of the Western Cape in South Africa. She was the convenor of the Laboratory of Kinetic Objects (LoKO) which engages in performance as well as research and intellectual enquiry into the human and technological interface, the puppet, Artificial Intelligence (AI) and Intelligence Amplification (IA). Her performance/lecture “Ne’er So Much the Ape” (which takes its title from an old English adage, ‘ne’er so much the Ape as when he wears the doctor’s cape’) explored the articulation of primate research, race theory, AI, and performance theory.

In 1987, she and David Bunn co-edited From South Africa (University of Chicago Press), an anthology which documents the Years of Emergency in the last decade of apartheid in that country, through new photography, graphics, literature. In 1994, she and David Bunn curated the exhibition "Displacements" at the Block Gallery, Northwestern University, Illinois. In 1996, she curated "Fault Lines," an exhibition at Cape Town Castle on truth and reconciliation. "Fault Lines" was also, more broadly, a series of cultural responses which she initiated in order to draw artists from the international community into exploring the discourses and practices of Truth and Reconciliation. She wrote about Jarry's Pere Ubu and she also wrote the playtext of "Ubu and the Truth Commission" with artist/director William Kentridge and Handspring Puppet Company.

In 2001, she wrote the libretto for The Confessions of Zeno for Kentridge and Handspring. She later edited Handspring Puppet Company (David Krut publishers, 2009), a substantial study of this world-renowned South African performance troupe.

Taylor was a co-editor of Refiguring the Archive, a volume which surveyed the field of archive fever in the last decade (Kluwer Academic Press); and curated the exhibition, "Holdings", which engaged with the question of value, the archive and memory.

She received the Olive Schreiner Prize for new fiction for her Of Wild Dogs in 2006.

In 2009, she published The Transplant Men, a novel that examines the life of the South African heart surgeon, Chris Barnard. She was a visiting fellow at the University of Chicago and at Oxford and Cambridge Universities as well as a Rockefeller Fellow at Emory University, Atlanta.

She received Fellowships from Mellon and Rockefeller, and was a visiting professor at Oxford and at Cambridge. From 2000 to 2009, she was the Skye Chair of Dramatic Arts at the University of the Witwatersrand. In Fall 2011, she was Writer-in-Residence at Northwestern University. For several years she was a periodic Visiting Professor at the University of Chicago.

The Renaissance scholar Stephen Greenblatt commissioned Taylor as one of a dozen playwrights to make a version of "Cardenio", a play allegedly written originally by Shakespeare, and that has disappeared leaving nothing but the name of the work. Her production, "After Cardenio" opened in Cape Town in August 2011. It is a work of avant garde puppet theatre, which works with a vellum puppet made by South African sculptor Gavin Younge.

She was an advisor for dOCUMENTA 2012. She and medievalist David Nirenberg exchanged a series of letters as one of the published notebooks (online at www3.documenta.de/uploads/tx_publications/103_Taylor-Nirenberg.pdf) for dOcumenta. From 2013-2016, she held the Wole Soyinka Chair of Theatre at the University of Leeds. In 2016, she was Visiting Avenali Chair of the Humanities at University of California, Berkeley. In 2017, she published Being Led By the Nose (University of Chicago), a study of the artist/director William Kentridge’s production of Shostakovitch’s opera The Nose for the New York Metropolitan Opera. She had an abiding interest in the History and Theory of the performance of sincerity and explored this question with regard to the histories of performance, the law, and theology.
