= Michael Lessac =

American film director (born 1940)

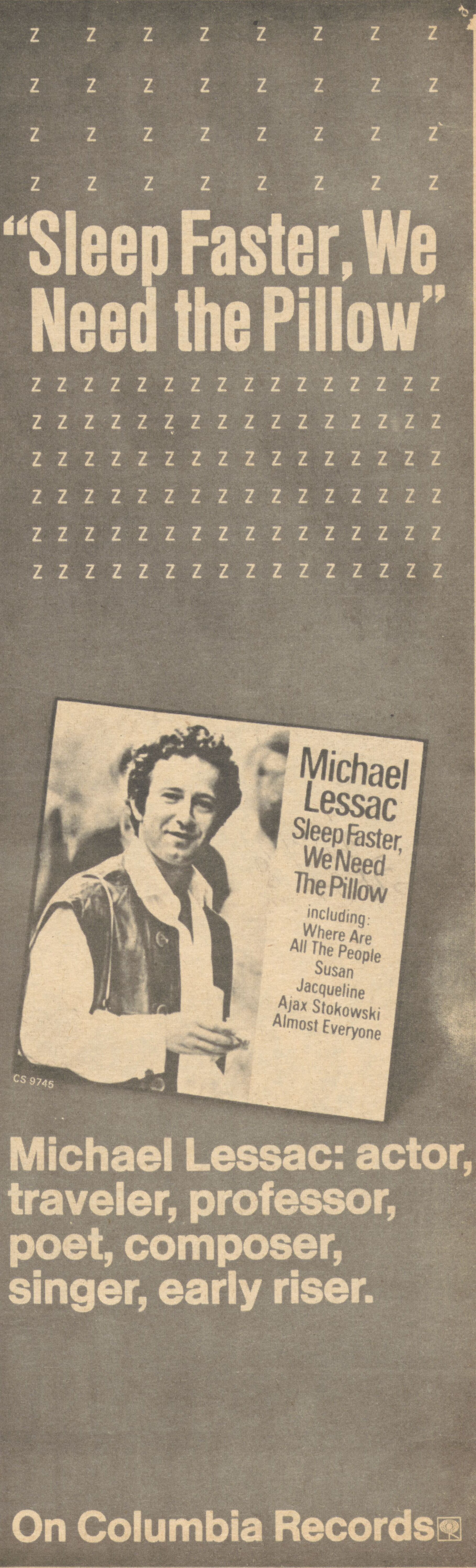
- Ad for Lessac's 1968 album "Sleep Faster, We Need the Pillow"
- Born: 1940 (age 84–85)
- Occupation(s): Director, screenwriter

Michael Lessac (born 1940) is a theatre, television, and film director and screenwriter. Lessac is also the Artistic Director of Colonnades Theatre Lab, Inc and of Colonnades Theatre Lab, South Africa. He is the Project Creator & Director of the international theatre piece, Truth in Translation.

== Career ==
Lessac started his career in theatre after having received a Ph.D. in developmental and perceptual psychology at the University of Pennsylvania in 1965 under the tutelage of Richard Solomon and Henry Gleitman, and was then given a McKnight Fellowship to the Tyronne Guthrie Theater in Minneapolis. Later Lessac was given a two-year Ford Foundation Grant to work at the national theatres of England, Italy, France, Poland, Romania, Yugoslavia and the Soviet Union. He also developed his interest in music and was signed to Columbia Records in 1968 to record an album, Sleep Faster, We Need the Pillow, produced by John Hammond.

From 1974 to 1984, as founder and artistic director of the Colonnades Theatre Lab in New York City, Lessac produced and directed over thirty productions and maintained and trained a company of eighteen actors, three playwrights, four composers, and a lighting, sound, set design/construction team. The theatre received numerous awards for its work over this period, most notably for its premiere productions of international theatre including original adaptations of the novels of Bulgakov (Molière in Spite of Himself) and Frank O’Connor ("Guests of the Nation" later seen on public television in the US). The Colonnades production of Shakespeare’s Cabaret, transferred to Broadway where it was nominated for several musical Tony Awards.

The Colonnades received Drama Desk and new Drama Forum awards, and was an official Ford Foundation “challenge grant” theatre; an annual recipient of grant awards from the National Endowment for the Humanities, the New York State Council on the Arts, the Axe-Houghton Foundation and the Xerox Corporation. Interspersed with his work at the Colonnades, Lessac directed at the National Theatre of Yugoslavia (Dubrovnik, Zagreb); the Guthrie Theater in M.N.; The Denver Theatre Center; The Arena Stage and the Kennedy Center in Washington, D.C., and The Public Theater in New York City.

Lessac then wrote and directed House of Cards starring Tommy Lee Jones and Kathleen Turner, which was produced by A&M and Penta Films, distributed by Miramax (1993). He has directed over 200 television shows and sixteen pilots including Taxi, Newhart, Grace Under Fire, The Drew Carey Show, The Naked Truth, Just Shoot Me, Everybody Loves Raymond, George and Leo, Titus, and Lucky among others. He also directed Kathleen Turner in the one-woman show Tallulah, based on the life of Tallulah Bankhead.
