= Pamela Nomvete =

Ethiopian-born South African actress

- Born: 1963 (age 62–63); Ethiopia
- Education: Royal Welsh College of Music & Drama
- Occupation: Actress

Pamela Nomvete (born 1963) is a South African actress known for her dramatic role in the South African sopie Generations. She's also acted and directed in other South African TV productions.

== Life ==
Pamela Nomvete was born in Ethiopia to South African parents. She spent her childhood in many different countries, and attended boarding school in the United Kingdom, later studying at the Royal Welsh College of Music and Drama. At one point she lived in Manchester, where her sister was a student. After working as an actress in the United Kingdom, Nomvete moved to Johannesburg, South Africa in 1994, after the election of Nelson Mandela as president and the formal end of apartheid.

In the 1990s, Nomvete embarked on a television career, achieving fame in the South African soap opera Generations. Her character Ntsiki Lukhele was "TV's ultimate super-bitch: power-hungry, manipulative and deadly". However, Nomvete herself struggled with depression after her husband's infidelity and her divorce. As her life unravelled, at one point she was living in her car, selling clothes for food and cigarettes.

In Zulu Love Letter (2004), Nomvete played Thandeka, a single mother and journalist struggling to communicate with her thirteen-year-old daughter. While pregnant with her child, Thandeka was tortured by an Apartheid hit squad, which she believes left the child deaf. Nomvete's performance won her a FESPACO Best Actress Award in 2005.

In 2012–13, she appeared in the long-running UK soap opera Coronation Street, playing Mandy Kamara, an old flame of the character Lloyd Mullaney (played by Craig Charles). It would later be discovered that Lloyd was the biological father of Mandy's daughter Jenna.

In 2013 she published an autobiography, Dancing to the Beat of the Drum: In Search of My Spiritual Home.

Nomvete practices Nichiren Buddhism.

In 2023, Nomvete voiced Ntsiki Lukhele in the animated series Supa Team 4.

== Film appearances ==
- Born Free: A New Adventure, 1996
- Zulu Love Letter, 2004
- Sometimes in April, 2005
- Lockdown, 2021

== Television appearances ==
- Andor, 2022
- Motherland (British TV series), 2019

== Stage appearances ==
- Now or Later by Christopher Shinn at the Royal Court Theatre, 2008
- Welcome to Thebes by Moira Buffini at the Royal National Theatre, 2010
- Coriolanus by William Shakespeare at the Royal National Theatre, 2024 as Volumina
- Liberation by Zodwa Nyoni at Royal Exchange Theatre, 2025 as Amy Ashwood Garvey
