= Neil Bartlett (playwright) =

British director, performer, translator and writer (born 1958)

Neil Vivian Bartlett OBE
- Born: 1958 (age 67–68)
- Occupations: Director, performer, translator, writer
- Notable work: The Dispute, Pericles
- Awards: Perrier Award (1985); Time Out Dance Umbrella Award; Writers Guild Award; Time Out Theatre Award; Special Jury Prize at the Cork Film Festival; OBE (2000); Olivier Award nomination
- Website: www.neil-bartlett.com

Neil Vivian Bartlett, OBE (born 1958) is a British director, performer, translator and writer. He was one of the founding members of Gloria, a production company established in 1988 to produce his work along with that of Nicolas Bloomfield, Leah Hausman and Simon Mellor.

His work has garnered several awards, including the 1985 Perrier Award (as director for Complicité, for More Bigger Snacks Now), the Time Out Dance Umbrella Award (for A Vision of Love Revealed in Sleep), a Writers Guild Award (for Sarrasine), a Time Out Theatre Award (for A Judgement in Stone), and the Special Jury Prize at the Cork Film Festival (for Now That It's Morning). His production of The Dispute won a Time Out Award for Best Production in the West End and the 1999 TMA Best Touring Production award. He was appointed an OBE in 2000 for his services to the arts. His 2004 production of Shakespeare's Pericles was nominated for an Olivier Award for Outstanding Theatrical Achievement in 2004.

== Career ==
Bartlett's first book, Who Was That Man, showed how the gay history of London in the 1890s affected Bartlett's life as a gay man in London in the 1980s. His fourth novel, The Disappearance Boy, was published in London by Bloomsbury Circus in January 2014; his most recent novel Address Book was published in London by Inkandescent in November 2021.

Bartlett's early performance work with Gloria included A Vision of Love Revealed in Sleep, Sarrasine and Night after Night. He also served as artistic director at the Lyric Theatre Hammersmith from 1994 until 2004. At the Lyric he directed productions of classic British plays, foreign classics which he translated or adapted, and a series of notable Christmas shows. The following are some of the plays he directed and translated:

- The first English production of Jean Genet's Splendid's
- Kleist's Prince of Homburg and Marivaux's La Dispute
- His adaptation of Charles Dickens' Oliver Twist, and A Christmas Carol.
- Adaptation of The Servant by Robin Maugham.

Many of Bartlett's translations of classic plays have been performed throughout the world.

Since leaving the Lyric he has created work for leading cultural producers including the National Theatre in London, the Abbey in Dublin, the Bristol Old Vic, the Manchester Royal Exchange, the Edinburgh International Festival, the Manchester International Festival, the Brighton Festival, the Aldeburgh Festival, the Holland Festival, the Wellcome Foundation and Tate Britain.

He also took part in the Bush Theatre's 2011 project Sixty Six Books, where he wrote a piece based upon a chapter of the King James Bible

In 2022, he adapted Virginia Woolf's novel Orlando for a West End production that was directed by Michael Grandage and starred Emma Corrin.

In 2016 Bartlett read aloud the complete text of Oscar Wilde's De Profundis (1897) in the old chapel of HM Prison Reading, where Wilde had been incarcerated from 1895 to 1897.

== Work ==
=== Fiction ===
- Who Was That Man: A Present for Mr. Oscar Wilde (1988)
- Ready to Catch Him Should He Fall (1992)
- "Caesar's Gallic Wars" (1996) (short story)
- Mr. Clive and Mr. Page (1996)
- Skin Lane (2007)
- 'When the Time Comes; or, the Case of the Man Who Didn't Know' (2008) (short story)
- The Disappearance Boy (2014)
- Address Book 2021

=== Theatre and radio ===
- More Bigger Snacks Now (1985), director for Complicité
- A Vision of Love Revealed in Sleep (Part One) (1987)
- The Misanthrope (1988), translator for Red Shift
- Lady Audley's Secret (1988–89) for Gloria
- A Vision of Love Revealed in Sleep (Part Three) (1989–90) for Gloria
- Berenice (1990) for the Royal National Theatre
- The School for Wives (1990) for the Derby Playhouse
- Sarrasine (1990–91) for Gloria
- The Avenging Woman (1991) in Riga
- Let Them Call It Jazz (1991) for Gloria
- Twelfth Night (1992) for the Goodman Theatre, Chicago
- A Judgement in Stone (1992) for Gloria
- The Game of Love and Chance (1992–93) for Gloria/Cambridge Theatre Co./Royal National Theatre
- Night After Night (Part One) (1993), musical
- The Picture of Dorian Gray (1993), Lyric Hammersmith
- Romeo and Juliet (1995), Lyric Hammersmith/West Yorkshire Playhouse
- The Letter by Somerset Maugham (1995), Lyric Hammersmith
- Mrs Warren's Profession by Bernard Shaw (1996), Lyric Hammersmith
- Cause Celebre by Terence Rattigan (1998), Lyric Hammersmith
- The Seven Sacraments of Nicolas Poussin (1998)
- The Verger Queen or Bette's Full Service (2000)
- In Extremis (2000)
- Does You Good (2001)
- Camille (2003), adaptation of The Lady of the Camellias
- Pericles by William Shakespeare (2003), Lyric Hammersmith,
- Don Juan by Molière (2004), Lyric Hammersmith,
- Improbable (2004), radio
- Dido, Queen of Carthage by Christopher Marlowe (2005), ART Boston,
- The Rake's Progress Auden/Stravinsky (2006), Aldeburgh Festival,
- Oliver Twist (2007), ART Boston,
- The Maids by Genet (2007), Brighton Festival,
- Twelfth Night by William Shakespeare (2008), Royal Shakespeare Company,
- An Ideal Husband by Oscar Wilde (2008), The Abbey, Dublin,
- Romeo and Juliet by William Shakespeare (2008), Royal Shakespeare Company,
- Everybody Loves A Winner (2009), Manchester Royal Exchange,
- The Turn of the Screw by Benjamin Britten (2009), Aldeburgh Festival,
- Or You Could Kiss Me (2010), with Handspring Theatre Company, National Theatre, London,
- The Queen of Spades by Tchaikovsky (2011), Opera North,
- The Picture of Dorian Gray by Oscar Wilde (2012), The Abbey, Dublin,
- The Canticles by Benjamin Britten (2013), Brighton Festival/Royal Opera House, London,
- Great Expectations by Charles Dickens (2013), The Bristol Old Vic,
- Owen Wingrave by Benjamin Britten (2014), The Edinburgh International Festival,
- Stella (2016), London International Festival of Theatre,
- The Plague by Albert Camus (2017), Arcola Theatre, London.
- Medea (Written in Rage) by Jean-René Lemoine (2017), Birmingham Rep
- Twenty Four Hours of Peace (2019) Royal Exchange Theatre, Manchester.
- The Importance of Being Earnest by Oscar Wilde (2020), RADA, London.
- Tenebrae; Lessons Learnt in Darkness (2020), Brighton Festival.
- Orlando (2022), Garrick Theatre, London.
- As You Like It (2023), BA Acting CDT, Royal Central School of Speech and Drama, London

=== Television ===
- That's What Friends Are For (1988) television, for After Image/Channel Four
- Where Is Love? (1988) television, for ICA/BBC2
- Pedagogue (1988) with Stuart Marshall
- That's How Strong My Love Is (1989) television, for Channel Four
- Now That It's Morning (1992) television, for Channel Four/British Screen

== Sources ==
- Bartlett, Neil, adapter. 2003. Camille. By Alexandre Dumas fils. London: Oberon. ISBN 1-84002-360-0.
- Bartlett, Neil. 2005. Solo Voices: Monologues 1987-2004. London: Oberon. ISBN 1-84002-465-8.
- Burton, Peter, editor. 2008. A Casualty of War: the Arcadia Book of Gay Short Stories. London: Arcadia Books. ISBN 978-1-906413-31-6.
