= Ubu and the Truth Commission =

1997 play by Jane Taylor

Ubu and the Truth Commission is a South African play by Jane Taylor. It was first produced on 26 May 1997, directed by William Kentridge at The Laboratory in Johannesburg's Market Theatre.

Produced by the Handspring Puppet Company, and employing a multimedia approach in the tradition of Erwin Piscator and Bertolt Brecht, the production of Ubu combines puppetry with live actors, music, animation, and documentary footage, while drawing extensively from Alfred Jarry's absurdist production Ubu Roi (1896). It fuses the chaos of the Ubu legend with original testimony from witnesses at the post-apartheid Truth and Reconciliation Commission (TRC).

== The TRC ==
In her "Writer's Note" to the 2007 book-form publication of the play, Taylor wrote,

What has engaged me as I have followed the Commission, is the way in which individual narratives come to stand for the larger national narrative. The stories of personal grief, loss, triumph and violation now stand as an account of South Africa's recent past. History and autobiography merge. This marks a significant shift, because in the past decades of popular resistance, personal suffering was eclipsed – subordinated to a larger project of mass liberation. Now, however, we hear in individual testimony the very private patterns of language and thought that structure memory and mourning. Ubu and the Truth Commission uses these circumstances as a starting point.

The Truth and Reconciliation Commission was established in 1996 with what Taylor described as a "momentous mandate", to solicit testimony from those who identified as casualties, perpetrators, or survivors of the apartheid atrocity. Coming almost exactly two years after South Africa's first democratic elections, the Commission's purposes, in Taylor's eyes, were "to retrieve lost histories, to make reparation to those who had suffered, to provide amnesty for acts which were demonstrably political in purpose [... and, among the most important] to create a general context through which national reconciliation might be made possible."

"The Commission itself is theatre," wrote William Kentridge, "or at any rate a kind of ur-theatre [...]. One by one witnesses come and have their half hour to tell their story, pause, weep, be comforted by professional comforters who sit at the table with them. The stories are harrowing, spellbinding. The audience sit at the edge of their seats listening to every word. This is exemplary civic theatre, a public hearing of private griefs which are absorbed into the body politic as a part of a deeper understanding of how the society arrived at its present position."

== Plot ==
Pa Ubu (played by Dawid Minnaar) has been spending a great deal of time away from home, much to the concern and suspicion of his wife (Busi Zokufa). She smells an odour on him that she suspects may be that of another woman, a mistress. But, he is an agent of a governmental death squad, and the odour that she smells is of blood and dynamite.

After the abolition of apartheid, the TRC is established. It offers amnesty to those war criminals who come forward and offer full and truthful testimony regarding their infractions. Ubu, suspecting a trick, is unsure of what to do. The play follows his indecisive actions as they lead his path finally to a convergence with that of the TRC.

== Conception, production and performance ==
Kentridge had been working for some years with the Handspring Puppet Company in Johannesburg before the idea for Ubu and the Truth Commission was mooted. He had extensive experience with theatre that incorporated animation, puppets and actors. He did not, he claimed, pursue the multimedia realm because of any aesthetic ideal, but rather because he was skilled in the art of animation anyway and was curious to see how it would combine with puppet theatre. Woyzeck on the Highveld (1993) and Faustus in Africa (1996) were successful tone-setters in this respect. The latter, according to Kentridge, was "a huge undertaking", after which he and the company were on the look-out for something small to "do and survive". Samuel Beckett's Waiting for Godot seemed ideally suited to puppetry, "[b]ut we reckoned without the Beckett fundamentalists who would not give permission for us to leave out even a comma from the stage directions".

In a bid to secure a neo-Becketian text (but not having the skill to write their own), and after rejecting several ideas, they considered a project called Waiting Room. This consisted of interviews with land-mine victims waiting in rural orthopaedic hospitals in Angola and Mozambique.

At the time, Kentridge happened to be etching a series of pieces for an exhibition in honour of the centenary of Ubu Roi's opening appearance in Parisian theatre. They concerned a naked man in front of a blackboard on which were drawings of Ubu, "with his pointed head and belly spiral". Kentridge intended when the etchings were complete to animate the chalk drawings, which led him to the natural conclusion that the naked man might as well be animated, too. He asked a friend in choreography if she would care to have a dancer in front of screen on which a "schematic line drawing" of Ubu was to move about.

When Kentridge realised that he could not immerse himself in both the Ubu and the Waiting Room projects simultaneously, he panicked and chose to combine the two. When the TRC took off, it became clear that he need look no further in his hunt for material, for "an avalanche" was streaming in every day. While he went about convincing the two parties to come together, he formed an ever-clearer picture of how the two could complement one another. The grave documentary material from the TRC could lend to the rampant burlesque, "which always had a danger of becoming merely amusing", a certain dignity and sobriety, while the untamed liberty which characterised Ubu Roi could shed new light and offer a fresh and lively perspective on the depressing affairs of the TRC.

Looking at the play retrospectively, Kentridge did not feel that its shoddy provenance had maledicted it; rather it had accorded its writer, director and producers a gradually compounding platform on which they could "find pieces of the play, images, literary conceits, changing physical metaphors that we would never have arrived at if we had started from a sober beginning".

"There is," wrote Taylor of Ubu Roi and its main character's madness, "a particular kind of pleasure for an audience watching these infantile attacks. Part of the satisfaction arises from the fact that in the burlesque mode which Jarry invents, there is no place for consequence. While Ubu may be relentless in his political aspirations, and brutal in his personal relations, he apparently has no measurable effect upon those who inhabit the farcical world which he creates around himself. He thus acts out our most childish rages and desires, in which we seek to gratify ourselves at all cost. It is this feature in particular which has informed our own production."

As she viewed the TRC's proceedings, Taylor was deeply affected by the frequency of the recounted atrocities and the negligence and ignorance with which so many were carried out. She noted that "those perpetrators who seem to have some capacity for remorse, appear to be shocked at observing, as if from the outside, the effect of their behaviour. Others simply show no response at all, so profound is the denial, or the failure of moral imagination." She plucked Ubu from the world of burlesque and action without consequence, and dropped him into one altogether different: "It is as if Cause and Effect are registered through different modes of expression in the play [...]."

=== Puppetry ===
The play's conception began in earnest with a meeting among Kentridge, and Basil Jones and Adrian Kohler, who all agreed in principle to employ Ubu as a vehicle for exploring the TRC. Near the end of 1996, Taylor attended numerous workshops with the Handspring Puppet Company and grew to appreciate the actors' capacities and the style of puppet theatre. Also discussed were such transcendental devices as the three-headed hound and the embrace of various hybrid forms of animation and puppetry: drawn figures were hand-controlled and filmed on a sequential frame-by-frame basis. Taylor later said that her writing was greatly informed not only by Kentridge's direction but also by these experiences, and believed that her colleagues were similarly inspired and edified.

Taylor came to see great significance in the figurative role of the puppet, for its every motion was, in essence, tropical:

The puppet draws attention to its own artifice, and we as audience willingly submit ourselves to the ambiguous processes that at once deny and assert the reality of what we watch. Puppets also declare that they are being "spoken through". They thus very poignantly and compellingly capture complex relations of testimony, translation and documentation apparent in the processes of the Commission itself.

It was early on in the workshops that the decision was taken as a finality to have Ma and Pa Ubu played by orthodox actors. "These characters thus exist, as it were, on one scale," wrote Taylor. "The witnesses, who are represented by puppet-figures, exist on another scale, and a great deal of their meaning arises out of this fact." Lewis Segal, writing in the Los Angeles Times, declared that the puppets incarnated "a helpless nobility in the face of great suffering", while noting that they represented only "a kind of supplement to a neo-Expressionist theatrical experience that the company defines primarily with human actors and film animation".

=== Testimonials ===
In tackling the matter of how to portray TRC testimonials on stage, the first question was, according to Kentridge, an ethical one: "what is our responsibility to the people whose stories we are using as raw fodder for the play?" He was uncomfortable with using "real" actors because "the audience ... [is] caught halfway between having to believe in the actor for the sake of the story, and also not believe in the actor for the sake of the actual witness who existed out there but was not the actor". Using a puppet, on the other hand, would leave the audience with no reason to believe that the puppet or puppeteer represented an actual witness: "The difference between the materials of which a puppet is made and human flesh," wrote Jones and Kohler, "can break the illusion that both exist in the same moment." Kentridge confirmed that "[t]he puppet becomes a medium through which the testimony can be heard."

Jones and Kohler, head puppeteers alongside Louis Seboko, elaborated:

Their responsibility in the play is both central and extremely onerous, as their task is to re-enact the deeply harrowing personal accounts of the effect of the former Apartheid State on people's lives. Badly handled, such stories could easily become a kind of horror pornography. The puppets assist in mediating this horror. They are not actors playing a role. Rather, they are wooden dolls attempting to be real people. As they attempt to move and breathe as we do, they cross the barrier of the here and now and become metaphors for humanity.

Each puppet was operated by two puppeteers. They bestowed upon it a metaphorical element of vulnerability, while also calling to mind the professional comforters who accompanied witnesses during TRC proceedings. These worked together to divide and cut down individual control over the puppet's movement and speech.

"This," explained Jones and Kohler, "encourages us to enter into the illusion that the puppet has a life and responsibility of its own. But the fact that the manipulators are present also allows us to use the emotions visible in the puppeteers' faces to inform our understanding of the emotions of the puppet character, with its immobile features [...]. Puppets are brought to life by the conviction of the puppeteer and the willingness of the audience. When an actor plays opposite a puppet, she or he participates in the same process. There can be no eye contact with the puppeteer. The actor's focus is solely on the puppet itself."

The endeavour was largely successful. "The plain wooden faces of these characters -- handled with enormous skill by Basil Jones, Adrian Kohler and Louis Seboko -- confer a power and credibility on their words that real actors could never achieve," wrote critic William Triplett. "In such scenes actors will try to make you feel what their characters have witnessed. But an expressionless puppet, especially one 'speaking' the unspeakable through one of the commission's monotoned translators, engages the imagination awesomely."

The company was especially pleased with the decision to use witness-puppets because the commission often had a translator to accompany each testifier: "Two speakers for the same story and our puppets need two manipulators," as Kentridge put it. "One manipulator could tell the story in Zulu and the other could translate." This did not work, however, as the stories could not be heard. Instead, the translators were placed in Ubu's shower, which served as a sort of booth. A difference was noted between the authentic witness voice and the contrived public address of the interlingual rendition.

A significant challenge to the skills of the puppeteers (especially those controlling the witnesses) came in the form of manipulating them at the right pace. They came to rely on a pace usually rather more sluggish than that of a normal actor, for it was important that the audience see precisely what it was that the puppet was doing. The puppeteers worked extensively with their figures to determine this, while also settling on specific moments of physical contact between puppet and orthodox human actor.

An even greater challenge was how to achieve a balance between the put-upon placidity of the witnesses and the delirious burlesque of Ma and Pa Ubu.

"When the play is working at its best," wrote Kentridge, "Pa Ubu does not hold back. He tries to colonise the stage and be the sole focus of the audience. And it is the task of the actors and manipulators of the puppets to wrest that attention back. This battle is extremely delicate. If pushed too hard there is the danger of the witnesses becoming strident, pathetic, self pitying. If they retreat too far they are swamped by Ubu. But sometimes, in a good performance, and with a willing audience we do make the witnesses stories clearly heard and also throw them into a wider set of questions that Ubu engenders around them."

Although the witness puppets were never to be seen by Ubu and his wife – they were situated in close spatial proximity to Ubu, behind his furniture, but made to appear elsewhere – their actions had a direct bearing upon them.

The most important consequence of this decision was that witnesses could be shown in manifold nooks of Ubu's life, not simply (as had originally been intended) in the witness stand. It also engendered an experimental scene in which Ubu lies on a table looking up in a dream at a puppet as it testifies about its child's demise. Initially, this scene was tried with the witness behind Ubu's hips, so that his body formed a rolling landscape, with a small rise from behind which the witness gave testimony. When the same scene was tried with the witness behind his head, it became evident that the best way to go would be turn the witness into a dream, and the story became Ubu's confession.

Kentridge recalled,

We put the witness behind Ubu's legs again and he was back in the landscape. We then tried to see how close the puppet could get to touching Ubu without breaking the double image. Extremely close we found. And then we tried it with the witness touching Ubu's hip with its wooden hand. An extraordinary thing happened. What we saw was an act of absolution. The witness forgave, even comforted Ubu for his act. These were a series of wholly unexpected meanings, generated not through clarity of thought, or brilliance of invention, but through practical theatre work. This is the second polemic I would make. A faith in a practical epistemology in the theatre-trusting in and using the artifices and techniques of theatre to generate meaning.

The opposite was also true, however, as in his idea of a dancer before an image-bearing screen. Both the dancer and the image were to be seen together, generating an elaborate figure, but it became obvious within twenty minutes of starting the project that, "[f]or reasons of synchronisation, parallax, lighting, [and] stilted performance", it was incompatible. "Next polemic – Mistrust of Good Ideas in the abstract. Mistrust of starting with a knowledge of the meaning of an image and thinking it can then be executed. There is for me more than an accidental linguistic connection between executing an idea and killing it."

Throughout the play, and specifically when Ubu feels insecure about being found out, an animated eye, intercut with a real one in classic Kentridge fashion, emerges on the screen to convey the sense that the main character is not quite so alone as he would like to think. The screen was used repeatedly and effectively in Kentridge's production. "[I]n every instance the images are more suggestive than real," wrote Triplett, "and hence more powerful."

=== Allusions and symbolism ===
Several of the play's marionettes carry allusions to the work of Jarry: the Palcontents of Ubu Cocu, the protagonist's "manic acts of mayhem", find representation as lethal and destructive vices in Taylor's play with a three-headed dog.

For symbolism more in keeping with the TRC, meanwhile, Kentridge was keen to include a paper shredder. "In South Africa at the moment," he explained, "there is a battle between the paper shredders and the photostat machines. For each police general who is shredding documents of his past there are officers under him who are Photostatting them to keep as insurance against future prosecutions. A normal machine, however, did not seem especially creative, so, after abandoning representative bread-slicers (in view of the palling thought of wasted dough), animated projections (in view of Kentridge's reluctance to spend hours drawing them) and the dog's mouth (in view of its narrowness), they settled on a crocodile's mouth, to be carried as a handbag by Ubu's wife. This crocodile, then, played the role not only of Ma Ubu's handbag; it was Pa Ubu's pet advisor and cover-up man, too, concealing incriminatory evidence in his mouth.

Three puppet-types – the vulture, the witnesses, Brutus the dog and Niles crocodile – were created. The puppeteers said it was "a fairly organic process", undertaken in accordance with the play's requirements. Each puppet-type had a unique and particular affiliation with Ma and Pa Ubu. The vulture, limited in its actions, was placed near the rear of the stage, where sporadically it offered sardonic aphorisms through a series of electronically contrived squawks that were translated on the screen behind it. "Thus," wrote the puppeteers, "it is a form of manipulation: like gears driven by motors which in turn are driven by a remote technician – which is appropriate to its function in the play – an apparently authorless automaton spewing forth programmed truisms."

The crocodile was given one manipulator, but the dog had one for each head. They moved about freely and in the same space as the human characters, rather than being restricted in the traditional playboard sense seen in such earlier plays as Woyzeck on the Highveld. The puppeteers thought it difficult, though, to conceive of their being represented by human characters.

Brutus, who speaks in verse, fills the role of Ubu's vicious henchman, stealing away with him to carry out atrocities: "Their culpability is indivisible." Each of its heads had its own character: one was a foot soldier, the other a general and the last a politician. The body was created out of an old briefcase given Sir Sydney Kentridge (William's activist-lawyer father) by Braam Fischer. Similarly, the crocodile's belly was a canvas kit bag previously the possession of Basil Jones's father during military service in North Africa. The scheme of using bags for bodies served to provide a suitable of place of hiding for Ubu, an easy place of discovery for his wife and an ideal place for Ubu to plant incriminatory evidence by which he could distance himself from their crimes.

Rather uniquely, Ubu and the Truth Commission allowed its puppeteers free and undisguised reign over the stage, and took advantage of the potential for interaction between them and their puppets. It was agreed early on in the play's conception that the TRC witnesses would be represented by puppets with their speaking manipulators visible next to them, for that was almost always the case with Handspring. "When [...] Basil Jones, Adrian Kohler and Louis Seboko hold the hands of the puppet characters in some of the most intense moments of 'Ubu and the Truth Commission,'" wrote Segal, "it seems as much an act of consolation as the method by which the large, carved doll-figures are made to gesture."

The play retains a great deal of its ancestor's scatology, opening, for example, with the word "Pschitt!", whose French equivalent, "Merdre!", invoked a riot at Jarry's premier in 1896. "'Ubu and the Truth Commission' dramatizes the politics of betrayal so graphically," opined Segal, "that it eminently deserves its adults-only designation."

== Protagonist ==
Of her main character and his role in the play, Taylor writes,

Ubu's story is, at one level, a singular story of individual pathology; yet it is at the same time an exemplary account of the relationships between capitalist ideology, imperialism, race, class, and gender, religion and modernisation in the southern African sub-region.

Nevertheless, Ubu retains in this play the antihero status first accorded him in Jarry's: he is a greedy, sadistic, homicidal, esurient, licentious apartheid police officer. Set against the TRC, "[o]ur agent is thus, in a sense, an agent of evil." Taylor justifies this with literary precedents like Paradise Lost, where John Milton, in William Blake's famous phrase, finds himself "of the Devils [sic] party", her belief that "[n]arrative depends on agency; the stories of those who 'do' are generally more compelling than those who are 'done to'", and the nature of the TRC itself, which cast the victims as protagonists and gave little emphasis to other players.

There was also, according to Taylor, another reason: "he provoked us. He is familiar but wholly foreign, he is both human and inhuman. He is the limit term which was used to keep an entire system of meaning in place, from its most extreme to its most banal." "You may not sympathize with the character," wrote Triplett, "but in the end you don't hate him either; instead you are left with the feeling that reconciliation just might be possible."

Although the play appropriates Jarry's agonist to the context of the TRC, it retains his archaic language and original slang, anachronising him as "a figure who lives within a world of remote forms and meanings". Ubu does not represent any particular figure in South African history; rather, he is "an aspect, a tendency, an excuse". Often, though, he speaks in voices reminiscent of those sounded at the TRC, his language set against its languages. As Taylor observes,

The archaic and artificial language which Ubu uses, with its rhymes, its puns, its bombast and its profanities, is set against the detailed and careful descriptions of the witness accounts which have been, in large measure, transcribed from TRC hearings. Ubu is confronted within his own home by those whom he has assaulted.

It is the structure of the play, according to its writer, merging Ubu legend with the ongoing Truth Commission, that gives it its meaning, with patent theatrical consequences:

Perhaps most evidently, we are automatically taking on the burden of the farcical genre which Jarry used. I remember having lengthy debates, with a student, about the ethics of Charlie Chaplin's The Great Dictator, and whether one could ever explore human rights abuses through a burlesque idiom. My responses now are perhaps more complex than they were then.

Taylor also noted that, in modern times of vast informational overloading, it was difficult always to respond, as expected, "with outrage, sympathy, or wonder, within a context that inculcates bewilderment and dislocation." Her play, then, sought to reproduce the ambiguous nature of response to suffering:

Our own reactions are questioned, because, after all, what is it in us that makes us seek out the stories of another's grief? Or, even more problematically, what makes us follow the stories of the torturers? We follow Ubu's history, are drawn into his family drama, are confronted with his logics of self-justification. We as audience are also implicated because we laugh at his sometimes absurd antics, and this very laughter accuses us.

While its focus is obviously South African, its application, according to Taylor, is broad in scope: "We in the late twentieth century live in an era of singular attention to questions of war crimes, reparations, global 'peace-keeping'. We are, it seems, increasingly aware of the obligation to hear testimony, even while we may yet be determining how to act upon what we have heard." Segal agreed:

Although the work should be a jolt for many Africa-watchers – offering a portrait of post-apartheid Mandela-land as anything but the best of all possible worlds – its key issues resonate far from that continent. Like Americans during the Clinton scandals, for instance, Mrs. Ubu (Busi Zokufa) fixates on accusations of sexual excess, not imagining that her lord and master might be committing bigger crimes; when she learns the truth, she immediately turns those crimes into media gold.

== Reception ==
In South African circles, the play was well received. The Star dubbed it a "multi-dimensional theatre piece which tries to make sense of the madness which overtook South Africa during apartheid", while Mark Gevisser predicted in The Sunday Independent that it "will be for post-apartheid theatre what Woza Albert was for protest theatre: a touchstone of artful, affecting political engagement".

In Los Angeles, Segal was all praise: "Director and animator William Kentridge skillfully [sic] integrates the movement of actors and puppets with his often startling animated chalk-drawings and live-action imagery projected at the back of the stage. 'Ubu' may be unrelievedly depressing, but it is executed with consummate artistry."

In The Washington Post, after viewing the play during a "regrettably brief" run of four performances at the John F. Kennedy Center for the Performing Arts, William Triplett described it to readers as a "stunningly theatrical multimedia piece that drives home the atrocity known as apartheid without ever uttering the words 'atrocity' or 'apartheid' or any like them. By turns chilling and hilarious, brutal and forgiving, the show casts a surreal light on the heart of darkness – and still manages to leave you with hope [...]. 'Ubu' is one of those rarities, a piece of political theater that transcends politics. Its truth is human, but you can hear it only from the mouths of puppets."

It was widely agreed that Dawid Minnaar and Busi Zokufa gave fair and accurate portrayals of Taylor's Ubus. "Minnaar and Zokufa give performances that are wonderfully alive in this tale of death and redemption," wrote Triplett. "Minnaar deserves a special ovation, since Taylor didn't write Pa Ubu as a monster, and Minnaar doesn't play him as one [...].

General production values, too, were lauded: "The dynamic sound, by Wilbert Schubel, is as complex as the entire range of emotions spanned by the show. Wesley France's lighting sometimes sweeps the bare stage, and other times pinpoints a small area, expanding and contracting focus when necessary."

After one performance, a Romanian woman, deeply moved by what she had seen, approached the cast to congratulate it. Surprise was expressed that a play of such local context could have been accessible to her. "That's it," she explained. "It is so local. So local. This play is written about Romania."

== Cast ==
- Director: William Kentridge
- Writer: Jane Taylor
- Pa Ubu: Dawid Minnaar
- Ma Ubu: Busi Zokufa
- Puppet characters: Basil Jones, Adrian Kohler, Louis Seboko, Busi Zokufa
- Stage manager and video operator: Bruce Koch
- Sound technician: Simon Mahoney
- Company and tour manager: Wesley France
- Animation: William Kentridge
- Assistant animators: Tau Qwelane, Suzie Gable
- Choreography: Robin Orlin
- Puppet master: Adrian Kohler
- Assistant puppet maker: Tau Qwelane
- Music: Warrick Sony, Brendan Jury
- TRC research: Antjie Krog
- Lighting design: Wesley France
- Sound design: Wilbert Schubel
- Film editor: Catherine Meyburgh
- Film and video research: Gail Behrmann
- Costumes: Adrian Kohler, Sue Steele
- Set design: William Kentridge, Adrian Kohler
- Production coordinator: Basil Jones
- Production: Art Bureau (Munich), Kunstfest (Weimar), Migros Kulturprozent (Switzerland), Niedersächsisches Staatstheater Hannover, The Standard Bank National Arts Festival, the Department of Arts, Culture, Science and Technology and the Market Theatre Foundation.

== Publication ==
Ubu and the Truth Commission was first published in book-form in 1998 by the University of Cape Town Press and has since undergone three reprints. They include the full playscript, notes by the writer, director and puppeteers, photographs from Kentridge's production, drawings and archive imagery.

== See also ==
- Truth and Reconciliation Commission (South Africa)
