= William Kentridge =

South African artist (born 1955)

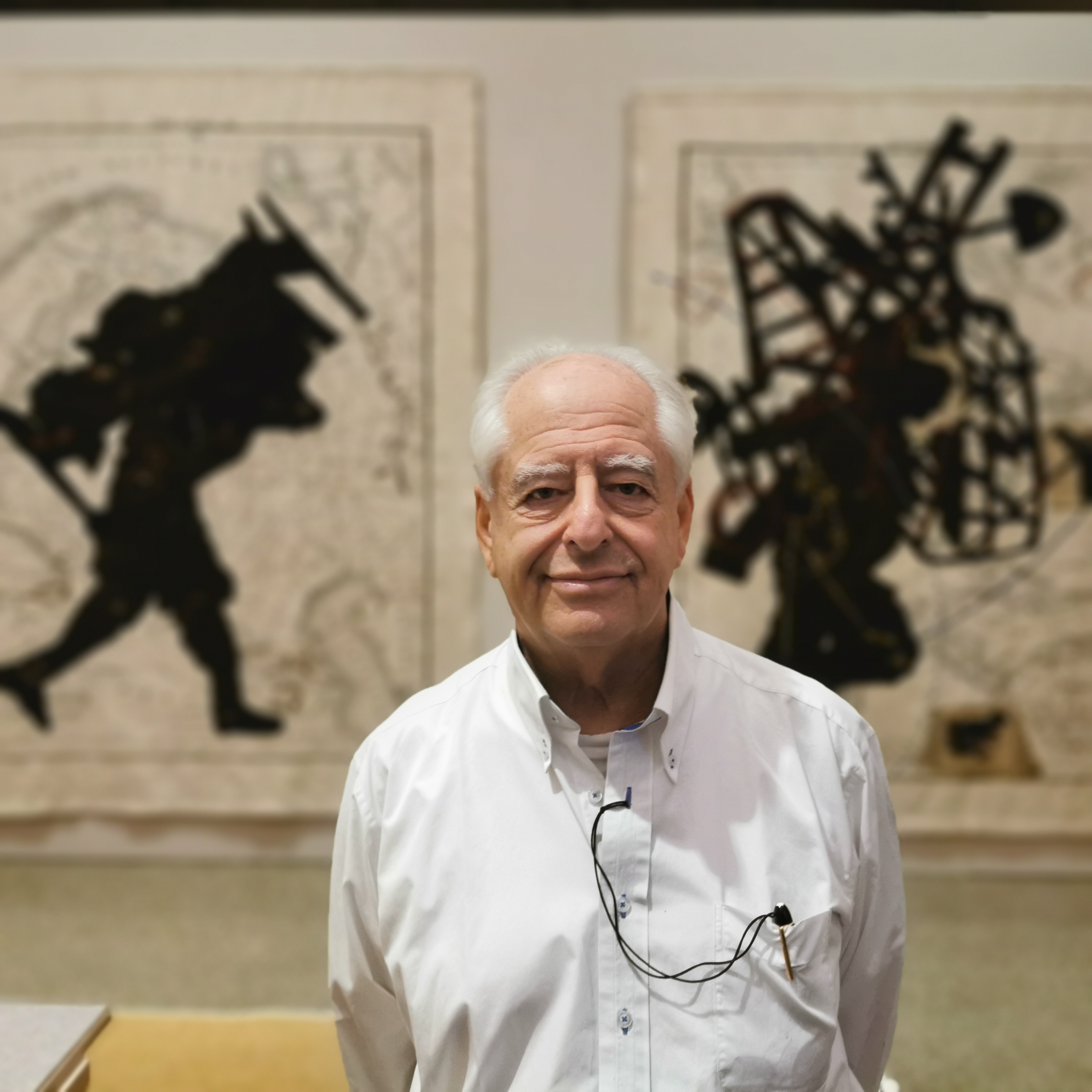
- Kentridge at the Museum Folkwang, Essen, Germany, in 2025
- Born: 28 April 1955 (age 71); Johannesburg, South Africa
- Education: University of the Witwatersrand and Johannesburg Art Foundation
- Spouse: Anne Stanwix
- Children: 3

William Kentridge (born 28 April 1955) is a South African artist best known for his prints, drawings, and animated films. He is especially noted for a sequence of hand-drawn animated films he produced during the 1990s, constructed by filming a drawing, making erasures and changes, and filming it again. He continues this process meticulously, giving each change to the drawing a quarter of a second's to two seconds' screen time. A single drawing will be altered and filmed this way until the end of a scene. These palimpsest-like drawings are later displayed along with the films as finished pieces of art.

Kentridge has created artwork as part of design of theatrical productions, both plays and operas. He has served as art director and overall director of numerous productions, collaborating with other artists, puppeteers and others in creating productions that combine drawings and multi-media combinations.

== Early life and career ==
Kentridge was born in Johannesburg, South Africa, on 28 April 1955 to Sydney Kentridge and Felicia Geffen, a Jewish family. Both were advocates (lawyers) who represented people marginalized by the apartheid system. He was educated at King Edward VII School in Houghton, Johannesburg. Kentridge revealed in an interview with artist Amadour, "I made my first charcoal work when I attended children's art lessons around eight. On the first day, the teacher at the art school asked, 'What do you want to draw?' And for some reason, I said, 'Landscape.' And they said, 'What do you want to use?' I said, 'Charcoal.' Then it was abandoned for decades, and I didn't think about it, and years later, I returned to charcoal as a primary medium." In 2016, he became perhaps the first artist to have a catalogue raisonné devoted exclusively to his juvenilia.

He earned a Bachelor of Arts degree in Politics and African Studies at the University of the Witwatersrand and then a diploma in Fine Arts from the Johannesburg Art Foundation. In the early 1980s, he studied mime and theatre at the L'École Internationale de Théâtre Jacques Lecoq in Paris, France. He originally hoped to become an actor, but said later: "I was fortunate to discover at a theatre school that I was so bad at being an actor [... that] I was reduced to an artist, and I made my peace with it." Between 1975 and 1991, he was acting and directing with Johannesburg's Junction Avenue Theatre Company. In the 1980s, he worked on television films and series as an art director.

== Work ==
Kentridge believed that being ethnically Jewish gave him a unique position as a third-party observer in South Africa. His parents were lawyers, well-known for their defence of victims of apartheid, which influenced his work. Much of his work also reflects South Africa's socio-political condition and history.

Kentridge has practised expressionist art, where form often alludes to content and vice versa, and he uses both composition and media to develop the meaning of the work. Additionally, Kentridge has often used instances of social injustice in South Africa in his work. For example, Casspirs Full of Love, viewable at the Metropolitan Museum of Art, uses imagery of a casspir: a vehicle used in South Africa to put down riots.

=== Prints and drawings ===
Print from portfolio Ubu Tells the Truth by William Kentridge, Honolulu Museum of Art

By the mid-1970s, Kentridge was making prints and drawings. In 1979, he created 20 to 30 monotypes, which soon became known as the "Pit" series. In 1980, he executed about 50 small-format etchings which he called the "Domestic Scenes". These two extraordinary groups of prints served to establish Kentridge's artistic identity, an identity he has continued to develop in various media. Despite his ongoing exploration of non-traditional media, the foundation of his art has always been drawing and printmaking.

In 1986, he began a group of charcoal and pastel drawings loosely based on Watteau's The Embarkation for Cythera. These works, which reflect a blasted, dystopic urban landscape, demonstrate the Kentridge's movement towards using the flexibility of space and movement.

In 1996–1997, he produced a portfolio of eight prints titled Ubu Tells the Truth, based on Alfred Jarry's 1896 play Ubu Roi. These prints also relate to the Truth and Reconciliation Commission conducted in South Africa after the end of apartheid. One of the stark and somber prints from this portfolio, in the collection of the Honolulu Museum of Art, is illustrated.

The Six Drawing Lessons, delivered as part of The Norton Lectures series at Harvard University in 2012, consider the work in the studio and the studio as a place of making meaning developed. A series of large drawings of trees in Indian ink on found encyclopedia pages, torn up and reassembled, analyzes the form of different trees indigenous to southern Africa. Drawn across multiple pages from books, each drawing is put together as a puzzle – the single pages first painted, then the whole pieced together.

"My drawings don't start with a 'beautiful mark'," writes Kentridge, thinking about the activity of printmaking as being about getting the hand to lead the brain, rather than letting the brain lead the hand. "It has to be a mark of something out there in the world. It doesn't have to be an accurate drawing, but it has to stand for an observation, not something that is abstract, like an emotion.

=== Animated films ===
Between 1989 and 2003, Kentridge made a series of nine short films, which he eventually gathered under the title 9 Drawings for Projection. In 1989, he began the first of those animated movies, Johannesburg, 2nd Greatest City After Paris. The series runs through Monument (1990), Mine (1991), Sobriety, Obesity & Growing Old (1991), Felix in Exile (1994), History of the Main Complaint (1996), Weighing and Wanting (1997), and Stereoscope (1999), and Tide Table (2003).

In 2011, Kentridge released a tenth film in the series, Other Faces (2011).

For the series, he used a technique that would become a feature of his work – successive charcoal drawings, always on the same sheet of paper, contrary to the traditional animation technique in which each movement is drawn on a separate sheet. His animations deal with political and social themes from a personal and, at times, autobiographical point of view, since the author includes his self-portrait in many of his works.

The political content and unique techniques of Kentridge's work have propelled him into the realm of South Africa's top artists. A theme running through all of his work is his peculiar way of representing his birthplace. While he does not portray it as the militant or oppressive place that it was for black people, he does not emphasise the picturesque state of living that white people enjoyed during apartheid either; he presents instead a city in which the duality of man is exposed. In a series of ten short films, he introduces two characters – Soho Eckstein and Felix Teitlebaum. These characters depict an emotional and political struggle that ultimately reflects the lives of many South Africans in the pre-democracy era.

In an introductory note to Felix In Exile, Kentridge writes,

In the same way that there is a human act of dismembering the past there is a natural process in the terrain through erosion, growth, dilapidation that also seeks to blot out events. In South Africa this process has other dimensions. The very term 'new South Africa' has within it the idea of a painting over the old, the natural process of dismembering, the naturalization of things new.

Not only in Felix in Exile but in all his animated works, the concepts of time and change comprise a major theme. He conveys it through his erasure technique, which contrasts with conventional cel-shaded animation, whose seamlessness de-emphasizes the fact that it is actually a succession of hand-drawn images. This he implements by drawing a key frame, erasing certain areas of it, re-drawing them and thus creating the next frame. He is able in this way to create as many frames as he wants based on the original key frame simply by erasing small sections. Traces of what has been erased are still visible to the viewer; as the films unfold, a sense of fading memory or the passing of time and the traces it leaves behind are portrayed. Kentridge's technique grapples with what is not said, what remains suppressed or forgotten but can easily be felt.

In the ten films that follow Soho Eckstein's life, an increasing vehemence is placed on the health of the individual and contemporary South African society. Conflicts between anarchic and bourgeois individualistic beliefs, again a reference to the duality of man, indicate the idea of social revolution by poetically disfiguring surrounding buildings and landscapes. Kentridge states that, although his work does not focus on apartheid in a direct and overt manner, but on the contemporary state of Johannesburg, his drawings and films are certainly influenced by the brutalised society that resulted from the regime.

As for more direct political issues, Kentridge says his art presents ambiguity, contradiction, uncompleted movements and uncertain endings, all of which seem like insignificant subtleties but can be attributed to most of the calamity presented in his work. In a mixed-media triptych entitled The Boating Party (1985), based on Renoir's painting of a similar name, the havoc caused by a seemingly-uninterested aristocracy is perhaps his most severe comment on the state of South Africa during apartheid. The languid diners sit at ease while the surrounding area is ravaged, torn and burned, a contrast that is reflected in his style and choice of colours.

In 1988, Kentridge co-founded Free Film-makers Co-Operative in Johannesburg. In 1999, he was appointed a film-maker by Stereoscope.

"Purely in the context of my own work," he wrote in a published playscript of his celebrated Ubu and the Truth Commission, "I would repeat my trust in the contingent, the inauthentic, the whim, the practical, as strategies for finding meaning. I would repeat my mistrust in the worth of Good Ideas. And state a belief that somewhere between relying on pure chance on the one hand, and the execution of a programme on the other, lies the most uncertain but the most fertile ground for the work we do [...]. I think I have shown that it is not the clear light of reason or even aesthetic sensibility which determines how one works, but a constellation of factors only some of which we can change at will."

In 2001, Creative Time aired his film Shadow Procession on the NBC Astrovision Panasonic screen in Times Square.

=== Opera ===
Kentridge has been commissioned to create stage design and act as a theatre director in opera. His political perspective is expressed in his opera directions, which involves different layers: stage direction, animation movies, and influences of the puppet world. He has staged Il ritorno d'Ulisse in patria (Monteverdi), Die Zauberflöte (Mozart) and The Nose (Shostakovich). Following the last work, he collaborated with the French composer François Sarhan on a short show called Telegrams from the Nose, for which he made the stage and set design for the performance.

In November 2015, his "provocative and visually stunning new staging" of Berg's Lulu, premiered at the Metropolitan Opera in New York, a co-production with the English National Opera and the Dutch National Opera. On 8 August 2017, William Kentridge's Wozzeck (Alban Berg) premiered at the Salzburg Festival and received enthusiastic reactions.

In 2023, Kentridge received the Laurence Olivier Award for Outstanding Achievement in Opera for the production of Sybil at the Barbican Theatre, London.

=== Tapestries ===
Kentridge's protean artistic investigation continues in his series of tapestries begun in 2001. The tapestries stem from a series of drawings in which he conjured shadowy figures from ripped construction paper; he made a collage of these with the web-like background of nineteenth-century atlas maps. To adapt these figures as tapestry, Kentridge worked in close collaboration with the Johannesburg-based Stephens Tapestry Studio, mapping cartoons from enlarged photographs of the drawings and hand-picking dyes to colour the locally spun mohair (goat hair).

=== Sculpture ===
In 2009, Kentridge, in partnership with Gerhard Marx, created a 10m-tall sculpture for his home city of Johannesburg entitled Fire Walker. In 2012, his sculpture Il cavaliere di Toledo was unveiled in Naples, Italy. Rebus (2013), referring in title to the allusional device using pictures to represent words or parts of words, is a series of bronze sculptures that form two distinct images when turned to a certain angle; when paired in correspondence, for example, a final image – a nude – is created from two original forms – a stamp and a telephone.

=== Murals ===
In 2016, the anniversary of Rome's legendary founding in 753BC, Kentridge unveiled Triumphs and Laments, a monumental mural along the right bank of the river Tiber. The 550m-long frieze depicting a procession of more than 80 figures from Roman mythology to the present is Kentridge's largest public work to date. To celebrate its launch, he and his long-time collaborator, the composer Philip Miller, devised a series of performances featuring live shadow play and more than 40 musicians.

== Family ==
Kentridge is married to Anne Stanwix, a rheumatologist, and they have three children. A third-generation South African of Lithuanian-Jewish heritage, he is the son of the South African lawyer Sydney Kentridge and the lawyer and activist Felicia Kentridge.

== Films ==
- 1989: Johannesburg, 2nd Greatest City After Paris (part of the Drawings for Projection)
- 1990: Monument (part of the Drawings for Projection)
- 1991: Mine (part of the Drawings for Projection)
- 1991: Sobriety, Obesity & Growing Old (part of the Drawings for Projection)
- 1994: Felix in Exile (part of the Drawings for Projection)
- 1996: History of the Main Complaint (part of the Drawings for Projection)
- 1996–97: Ubu Tells the Truth
- 1998: Weighing... and Wanting (part of the Drawings for Projection)
- 1999: Stereoscope (part of the Drawings for Projection)
- 1999: Shadow Procession
- 2001: Medicine Chest
- 2003: Automatic Writing
- 2003: Tide Table (part of the Drawings for Projection)
- 2003: Journey to the Moon
- 2009: Kentridge and Dumas in Conversation
- 2011: Other Faces (part of the Drawings for Projection)
- 2015: Notes Toward a Model Opera
- 2022: Self-Portrait as a Coffee Pot

Kentridge's films were shown at the 2004 Cannes Film Festival.

== Exhibitions ==
- 1997: Documenta X, Kassel, Germany
- 1998: São Paulo Biennial
- 1998: The Drawing Center, New York
- 1999: Barcelona Museum of Contemporary Art
- 1999: Venice Biennial
- 1999: Carnegie International
- 2000: Bienal de la Habana, Havana, Cuba
- 2000: Artlook South Africa, Gahlberg Gallery, College of DuPage
- 2002: Documenta 11, Kassel, Germany
- 2003: Goodman Gallery, Johannesburg
- 2003: Spacex Gallery, Exeter
- 2004: Metropolitan Museum, New York
- 2005: Musée d'art contemporain de Montréal
- 2006: Johannesburg Art Gallery
- 2006: Salzburg Museum der Moderne
- 2006: Museo de Arte Contemporáneo de Monterrey
- 2006: Museum of Contemporary Art, Chicago
- 2007: Smith College Art Museum
- 2007: Museum of Modern Art, New York
- 2007: University of Brighton Gallery
- 2007: Bienal do Mercosul, Porto Alegre
- 2008: Williams College Museum of Art
- 2008: Philadelphia Museum of Art
- 2008: Biennale of Sydney, Sydney, Australia
- 2008: William Kentridge Seeing Double, Marian Goodman Gallery, New York
- 2009: Chicago Museum of Contemporary Art
- 2009: San Francisco Museum of Modern Art
- 2009: Modern Art Museum of Fort Worth
- 2009: Henry Art Gallery, Seattle
- 2009: National Museum of Modern Art, Kyoto
- 2009: Norton Museum of Art, West Palm Beach
- 2010: Museum of Modern Art, New York
- 2010: Jewish Museum (New York), New York
- 2010: Hiroshima City Museum of Contemporary Art, Hiroshima
- 2010: Colorado Springs Fine Arts Center
- 2010: Jeu de Paume, Paris; In parallel with the Five Themes exhibition at the Jeu de Paume in Paris (2010), the artist was featured at the Louvre. The Louvre show, Carnets d'Egypte, included drawings of the artist, presented next to works from the museum collections, and videos shown in Louis XIVth's bed.
- 2010: Louvre, Paris
- 2010: William Kentridge: Five Themes, Albertina Museum
- 2011: Israel Museum, Jerusalem
- 2011: Museum of Modern Art (MOMA), New York City
- 2011: MACO, Oaxaca
- 2011: Garage Center for Contemporary Culture, Moscow
- 2011: Museum of Fine Arts, Budapest
- 2012: Australian Centre for the Moving Image, Melbourne
- 2012: Jewish History Museum, Amsterdam
- 2012: Documenta (13), Kassel, Germany
- 2012: Instituto Moreira Salles, Rio de Janeiro
- 2013: Volte Gallery, Mumbai
- 2013: mac, Birmingham
- 2013: MAXXI, Rome
- 2013: Pinacoteca do Estado de São Paulo, São Paulo
- 2014: Fortune: Banco de la República
- 2015: William Kentridge: Tapestries, Kewening Galerie
- 2015: EYE Film Institute Netherlands, Amsterdam: If We Ever Get To Heaven
- 2015: Haus Konstruktiv, Zurich: William Kentridge – The Nose (4 June to 6 September)
- 2015: Royal Academy Summer show
- 2016: Whitechapel Gallery – Thick Time (21 September 2016 to 15 January 2017)
- 2017: Louisiana Museum of Modern Art, Denmark
- 2017: Museum der Moderne Salzburg, – Thick Time (29 July – 5 November 2017)
- 2017: Performa 17, New York
- 2017/18: Old St. John's Hospital/Memlingmuseum, Bruges: Smoke, Ashes Fable
- 2018: Liebieghaus, Frankfurt: O Sentimental Machine
- 2018/19: Centro de las Artes de San Agustín (CaSa), Oaxaca: "More Sweetly Play the Dance" (Opened 4 November 2018)
- 2020–2021: Centre de Cultura Contemporània de Barcelona (CCCB), Barcelona: El que no està dibuixat ("That Which is Not Drawn") (9 October 2020 – 21 February 2021). Large retrospective including drawings, large-format tapestries, the audiovisual installation More Sweetly Play the Dance and the full series of 11 short animation films, Drawings for Projection. CCCB's exhibit has been the first place in Europe to premiere Kentridge's latest film, City Deep.
- 2022: M. K. Čiurlionis National Art Museum, Kaunas "That Which We Do Not Remember", part of Kaunas European capital of culture 2022 program.
- 2022: Royal Academy, London William Kentridge
- 2024: Taipei Fine Arts Museum William Kentridge
- 2024: Sharjah Art Foundation
- 2025: Art Gallery of Alberta
- 2025: Hauser & Wirth, New York William Kentridge: A Natural History of the Studio
- 2025/26: Museum Folkwang, Essen – William Kentridge: Listen to the Echo, a major retrospective spanning more than four decades and including films from Drawings for Projection, the Colonial Landscapes series, tapestries and Black Box/Chambre Noire.
- 2025/6: Yorkshire Sculpture Park
- 2026: Kunsthalle Praha, Prague

== Collections ==
Kentridge's works are included in the following permanent collections: Honolulu Museum of Art, the Kalamazoo Institute of Arts, the Museum of Contemporary Art, Chicago, the Museum of Modern Art (New York), and the Tate Modern (London). An edition of the five-channel video installation The Refusal of Time (2012), which debuted at documenta 13, was jointly acquired by the Metropolitan Museum of Art in New York and the San Francisco Museum of Modern Art. In 2015, Kentridge gave the definitive collection of his archive and art – films, videos and digital works – to the George Eastman Museum, one of the world's largest and oldest photography and film collections.

== Awards ==
- 1982: Red Ribbon Award for Short Fiction
- 1986: Market Theatre Award for New Vision exhibition
- 1986: AA vita Award at Cassirer fine Art
- 1987: Standard Bank Young Artist Award
- 1992: Woyzeck on the Highveld awards for production, set design & direction
- 1994: Loerie Award memo
- 1999: Carnegie Prize at Carnegie International
- 2003: Goslarer Kaiserring
- 2004: Honorary Doctor of Literature from the University of the Witwatersrand
- 2006: Jesse L. Rosenberger Medal from the University of Chicago
- 2010: Kyoto Prize
- 2012: Dan David Prize
- 2013: Commandeur des Arts et des Lettres
- 2019: Praemium Imperiale
- 2021: Honorary Doctor of Vrije Universiteit Brussel
- 2022: Honorary Doctor of Humane Letters from Columbia University
- 2024: William Kentridge was awarded the International Folkwang Prize in recognition of his transformative impact on the arts and culture.

Kentridge's Five Themes exhibit was included in the 2009 Time 100, an annual list of the 100 top people and events in the world. That same year, the exhibition was awarded First Place in the 2009 AICA (International Association of Art Critics Awards) Best Monographic Museum Show Nationally category.

In 2012, Kentridge was in residence at Harvard University invited to deliver the distinguished Charles Eliot Norton lectures in early 2012. That same year, he was elected to the American Philosophical Society.

At the 2023 Laurence Olivier Awards, Kentridge won the Outstanding Achievement in Opera award, for his conception and direction of Sibyl at the Barbican Theatre.

== Johannesburg arts incubator ==
In 2017, Kentridge founded a cross-disciplinary incubator called The Centre For The Less Good Idea along with Bronwyn Lace. The centre is located in Maboneng, Johannesburg alongside the artists studios and is currently led by Impresario, artist, musician Neo Muyanga.

== Art market ==
Kentridge's artworks are among the most sought-after and expensive works in South Africa: "a major charcoal drawing by world-renowned South African artist William Kentridge could set you back some £250,000". Kentridge is represented by Goodman Gallery, Lia Rumma Gallery and Hauser & Wirth (since 2024). From 1999 to 2024, he worked with Marian Goodman Gallery.

The South African record for Kentridge is R6.6 million ($320,000), set at Aspire Art Auctions in Johannesburg in 2018. One of his bronze pieces reached $1.5 million at Sotheby's New York in 2013.

== Notes ==
=== Sources ===
- Cameron, Dan; Christov-Bakargiev, Carolyn; Coetzee, J. M. (1999). William Kentridge. New York: Phaidon Press.
- Christov-Bakargiev, Carolyn (1998). William Kentridge. Brussels: Society des expositions du Palais des Beaux-Arts de Bruxelles. ISBN 90-74816-09-6.
- Cole, William (2016). The Juvenilia of William Kentridge: An Unauthorized Catalogue Raisonné. Sitges: Cole & Contreras.
- Greg Kucera Gallery (2007), William Kentridge
- Kasfir, Sidney Littlefield (2000). Contemporary African Art. Thames & Hudson. ISBN 978-0-500-20328-6.
- Kentridge, William (2007). "Director's Note". Ubu and the Truth Commission. By Taylor, Jane. Cape Town: University of Cape Town Press. pp. viii–xv.
- McCulloch, Samantha; Williams-Wynn, Christopher (2015). "Conflicts between context and content in William Kentridge: Five Themes : a case study of the Melbourne exhibition". Museum Management and Curatorship. 30 (4): 283–295. doi:10.1080/09647775.2015.1060866. ISSN 0964-7775. S2CID 142528621 – via Taylor & Francis.
