= Eleanor Rhode =

Eleanor Rhode is a British Theatre Director and Artistic Director of Snapdragon Productions, which she founded with producer Sarah Loader.

== Selected work ==
- King John by William Shakespeare, Swan Theatre, January - March 2020
- Teddy by Tristan Bernays and Dougal Irvine, Watermill Theatre and UK Tour 2018
- Boudica by Tristan Bernays, Globe Theatre 2017
- When We Were Women by Sharman Macdonald (Orange Tree Theatre, 2015)
- Teddy by Tristan Bernays and Dougal Irvine (Southwark Playhouse, 2015)
- For All That - a musical by Alan Bryce (Centerstage Theatre, Seattle, 2015)
- Toast by Richard Bean (The Park Theatre, 2014)
- Thark by Ben Travers (The Park Theatre, 2013)
- The Drawer Boy by Michael Healey (Finborough Theatre, 2012)
- A Life by Hugh Leonard (Finborough Theatre, 2012)
- Generous by Michael Healey (Finborough Theatre, 2010)
