= Snapdragon Productions =

English theatre company

Snapdragon Productions was a London theatre company (dissolved in 2020). run by producer Sarah Loader and director Eleanor Rhode.

In 2018, they opened the UK Touring production Teddy by Tristan Bernays and Dougal Irvine. It opened at the Watermill Theatre and will finish its run at VAULTS Waterloo.

In April 2016, Snapdragon made their international debut at 59E59 Theaters, New York, with their Off-Broadway transfer of Toast by Richard Bean. Snapdragon's 2016 world premiere of Teddy by Tristan Bernays and Dougal Irvine received the 2016 Offie for Best New Musical.

Between 2013 and 2015, Snapdragon presented three plays at The Park Theatre in their 200-seat space including their production of Thark by Ben Travers. The revival was the first London production in nearly 30 years, and was the world premiere of its new adaptation by actor/writer Clive Francis. They returned to the venue in December 2013 to present the London premiere of The Dead Wait by Paul Herzberg.

On 27 August, Snapdragon's revival of Toast by Richard Bean opened at The Park Theatre and received a consistently positive response, particularly for the strong ensemble performances including those from Matthew Kelly and Simon Greenall. On 9 September, the company announced their production of Toast would tour the UK in 2016, culminating with a limited run Off-Broadway as part of 59E59's Brits Off Broadway festival. Their transfer to 59E59 Theaters received favourable reviews including Critics Pick from Ben Brantley of The New York Times.

Their co-production of Accolade by Emlyn Williams opened to strong reviews. This production was produced with Nicola Seed as part of the Stage One season for new producers.

== Selected work ==
- Teddy by Tristan Bernays, with music by Dougal Irvine, Watermill Theatre and UK Tour, 2018
- When We Were Women by Sharman Macdonald (Orange Tree Theatre, 2015)
- Teddy by Tristan Bernays, with music by Dougal Irvine (Southwark Playhouse, 2015)
- Accolade by Emlyn Williams (St James's Theatre, 2014)
- Toast by Richard Bean (The Park Theatre, 2014), UK Tour, 2016 and 59E59 Theaters, New York, 2016
- The Dead Wait by Paul Herzberg (The Park Theatre), 2013)
- Thark by Ben Travers (The Park Theatre, 2013)
- A Life by Hugh Leonard (Finborough Theatre, 2012)
- The Drawer Boy by Michael Healey (Finborough Theatre, 2012)
- Barrow Hill by Jane Wainwright (Finborough Theatre, 2012)
- Generous by Michael Healey (Finborough Theatre, 2010)
- A Day at the Racists by Anders Lustgarten (Finborough Theatre, 2010)
- Me and Juliet by Rodgers and Hammerstein (Finborough Theatre, 2010)
- Anna Karenina by Leo Tolstoy adapted by Helen Edmundson (Arcola Theatre, 2011)

== Productions in development ==
Productions in development include a Gorky's Vassa in a new adaptation by Luke Barnes; a UK Tour of their rock 'n' roll musical Teddy by Tristan Bernays and Dougal Irvine; and a retelling of the Boudica story from playwright Tristan Bernays.

== Reviews ==
In his final review for The Daily Telegraph, Charles Spencer heralded Snapdragon's production of Toast as “like a latter-day Ibsen but with rather better jokes… Constantly compelling.”. Overall, the production received twelve four-star reviews including from The Guardian, The Daily Telegraph, The Times, The Sunday Times, The Sunday Express, Time Out, The Stage, WhatsOnStage and the Evening Standard. In The Guardian, Michael Billington called the production of Thark "a joyous evening in a parallel universe". In a five-star review of A Life by Hugh Leonard, ThePublicReviews.com called Eleanor Rhode's production a “stunning revival of this minor-key comic masterpiece.” In the Financial Times, Sarah Hemming found the production of Generous on the whole impressive: "a witty, sympathetic exploration of human behaviour". Billington called it "bright, sharp, swift and well-acted". In the Independent on Sunday, Kate Bassett said of A Day at the Racists that although "this low-budget staging is a little rough around the edges" it was theatrically "the wow of the week".
