= A Life (play) =

A Life is a bittersweet comedy by Irish playwright Hugh Leonard. The primary character is Desmond Drumm, a highly intelligent but bitterly cynical civil servant who must try to make sense of his life after learning that he has a terminal illness.

A major subplot involves Drumm's feeling for Mary (once known as Mibs), the only woman he ever truly loved. Drumm alienated Mary years earlier, and she married a lazy, callow, layabout who represents everything Drumm dislikes in lower-class Irish culture. Drumm was a secondary character in Leonard's earlier Tony Award-winning play Da.

== Productions ==
The play had premiered at the Abbey Theatre, Dublin starring Cyril Cusack in 1979.

The play opened on Broadway at the Morosco Theatre on 2 November 1980 and closed on 3 January 1981 after 64 performances and 8 previews. Directed by Peter Coe, the cast featured Roy Dotrice as Drumm and Pat Hingle as Kearns. The play was nominated for four Tony Awards, including Best Play, Actor in a Play (Dotrice), Direction of a Play (Peter Coe), and Featured Actor in a Play (Adam Redfield). The Christian Science Monitor reviewer wrote: "'A Life' is eloquent, literate witty, and touching -- a rich and communicative theater event.... Hugh Leonard sheds fresh illumination on some of his favorite themes in this rich new character play at the Morosco Theater.... Drumm takes center stage in a work distinguished by Mr. Leonard's skillful blending of full-bodied comedy and deep-seated pathos."

The Irish Repertory Theatre presented the play Off-Broadway in June 2001, starring Fritz Weaver as Drumm and Pauline Flanagan as Mary.

In regional theatre, the Northlight Theatre, Chicago, Illinois, presented the play in March to April 2010, starring John Mahoney. It was also produced by Irish Repertory of Chicago in 2001, starring Daniel J. Travanti and Tony-winner Deanna Dunagan.

A Life received its first London revival in over 30 years at the Finborough Theatre in October 2012. Directed by Eleanor Rhode and produced by Snapdragon Productions, the cast included Hugh Ross as Drumm and Kate Binchy as Mary.

== Awards and nominations ==
=== Original Broadway production ===
Year	Award	Category	Nominee	Result
1981	Tony Award	Best Play		Nominated
1981	Tony Award	Best Actor in a Play	Roy Dotrice	Nominated
1981	Tony Award	Best Featured Actor in a Play	Adam Redfield	Nominated
1981	Tony Award	Best Direction of a Play	Peter Coe	Nominated
1981	Theatre World Award		Adam Redfield	Won
