= Teddy (musical) =

Teddy (the musical)
- Music: Dougal Irvine
- Book: Tristan Bernays
- Productions: 2015 Southwark Playhouse, 2018 UK Tour

Teddy is a Snapdragon Productions and Theatre Bench musical with music by Dougal Irvine and book by Tristan Bernays, set in the Elephant and Castle in London in 1956.

== Synopsis ==
The story follows two teenagers, Teddy and Josie, on a Saturday night in Elephant and Castle. They are both rebellious followers of the post-war Teddy Boy sub-culture. Teddy and Josie get to know each other sharing their love for Rock and Roll.

== Music ==
Original songs written for the show and a handful of original 1950s songs are performed by the on stage band Johnny Valentine and the Broken Hearts.

== Productions ==
- Watermill Theatre and UK Tour, 2018
- Southwark Playhouse, 2015

== Awards ==
It received the 2016 Offies for Best New Musical and Best Lighting Designer.
