= Archbold's Castle =

- Caisleán Archbold (Irish)
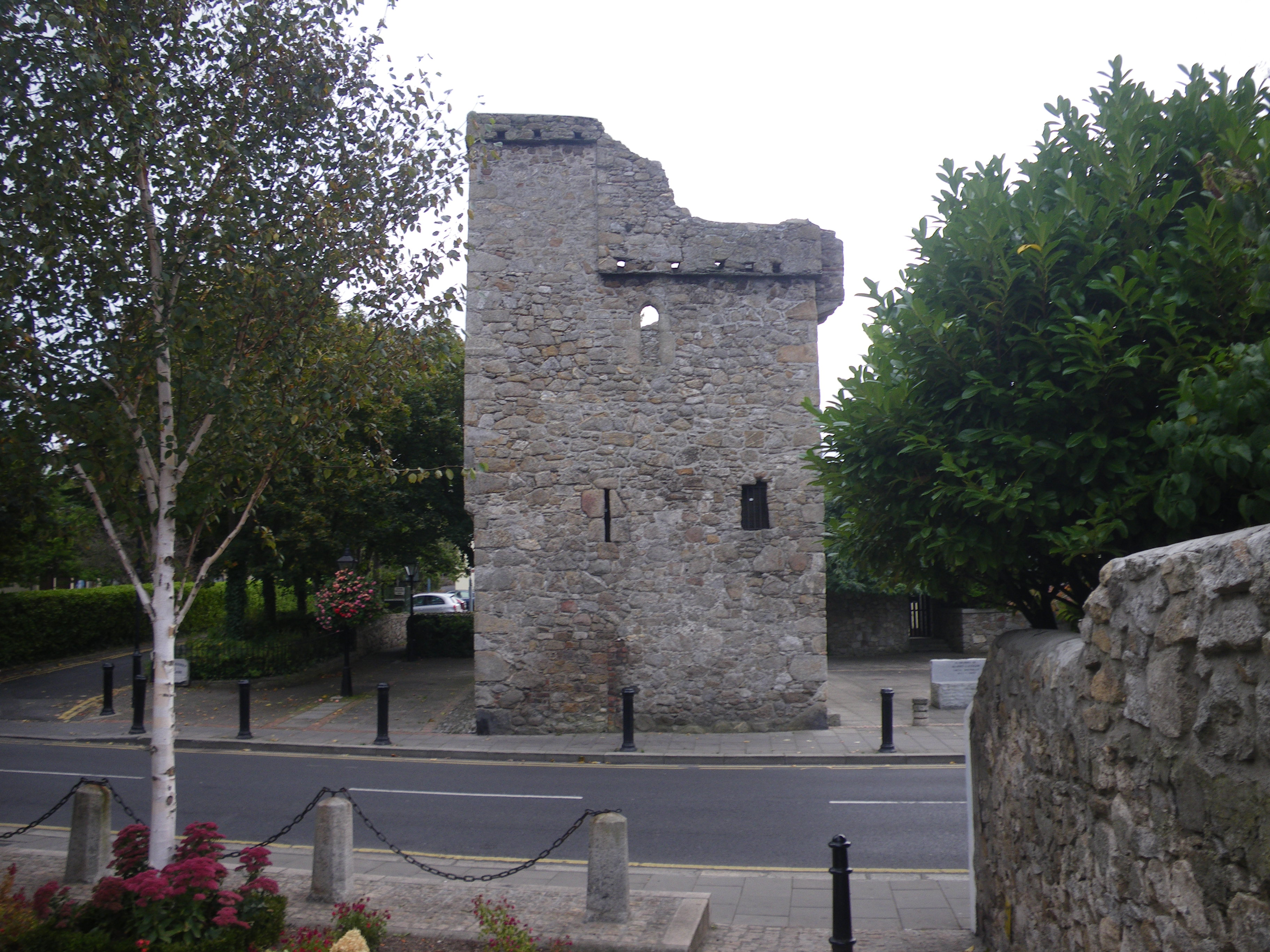

- Location within Dublin
- 53.27789°N 6.106422°W
- Type: Fortified warehouse
- Location: Castle Street, Dalkey, Dublin, Ireland

History
- Built: 14th century

Site notes
- Architectural style: Gothic

National monument of Ireland
- Official name: Archbold's Castle
- Reference no.: 444

Archbold's Castle is a castle and a National Monument in Dalkey, Ireland.

== Location ==
Archbold's Castle is found on a hill, in Dalkey, 60 m (200 ft) west of Goat Castle (now known as Dalkey Castle).

== History ==
Archbold's Castle was formerly a fortified warehouse, of which two storeys remain. A machicolation is visible above the doorway. Of seven castles which once stood in Dalkey, only two remain, Archbold's and Goat Castle. Archbold is a Hiberno-Norman surname, ultimately from Norman Archambault (ercan meaning "precious" + bald meaning "bold").
