= Da (play) =

1978 play by Hugh Leonard

- Written by: Hugh Leonard
- Characters: Da; Charlie Now; Drumm; Young Charlie; Mother; Oliver; Mrs. Prynne; Mary Tate, the Yellow Peril
- Original language: English
- Genre: Comedy
- Setting: May 1968; remembrances of times past

Premiere
- Date premiered: 1973; 1 May 1978 (Broadway)
- Place premiered: Olney Theatre Center; Morosco Theatre (Broadway)

Da is a 1978 memory play written by Hugh Leonard.

The play had its American premiere at the Olney Theatre Center in Olney, Maryland on 7 August 1973. Its New York City premiere came at the off-off-Broadway Hudson Guild Theatre in 1978, and this production transferred to Broadway shortly after the completion of its run. It was directed by Melvin Bernhardt and produced on Broadway by Lester Osterman, Marilyn Strauss and Marc Howard. It opened at the Morosco Theatre on 1 May 1978 and closed on 1 January 1980 after 697 performances. The scenic design was by Marjorie Kellogg, the costume design by Jennifer von Mayrhauser, and the lighting design by Arden Fingerhut. The original cast included Barnard Hughes as Da, Brian Murray as Charlie Now, Lois De Banzie as Mrs. Prynne, Mia Dillon as Mary Tate, Sylvia O'Brien as Mother, Lester Rawlins as Drumm, Richard Seer as Young Charlie, and Ralph Williams as Oliver. Brian Keith replaced Barnard Hughes toward the end of the Broadway run when Hughes went out on a National Tour across the U.S. and Canada. The play won the 1978 Drama Desk Award for Outstanding New Play, the 1978 New York Drama Critics' Circle Award for Best Play, the 1977/78 Outer Critics Circle Award for the Most Outstanding Play of the New York Season and the 1978 Tony Award for Best Play.

The play is set in Dalkey, County Dublin, in 1968, and times and places remembered, and is largely autobiographical. Its protagonist, an expatriate writer named Charlie Tynan, represents Leonard, who, like the character, was adopted. The play deals with Charlie's relationships with the two father figures in his life: "Da" – /'dæ:/ an Irish term for 'father'; his adoptive father, and Mr. Drumm, a cynical civil servant who becomes his mentor.

== Characters ==
- Charlie Now – Charlie Tynan, a middle-aged writer
- Oliver – Charlie's childhood friend
- Da – Nick Tynan, Charlie's recently deceased adoptive father
- Mother – Maggie Tynan, Charlie's long-deceased adoptive mother
- Young Charlie – Charlie as a boy and as a young man
- Drumm – Charlie's employer and mentor
- Mary Tate, The Yellow Peril – a young lady with a low reputation
- Mrs. Prynne – Da's old employer

== Plot ==
Charlie, a writer who has been living in London for many years, returns to his boyhood home in Dalkey, a suburb of Dublin, Ireland, after the death of his adoptive father. He finds that the house is filled with ghosts, of his parents and of his younger self. Charlie talks and interacts with all the ghosts, relives important moments from his youth, and comes to grips with his complicated feelings for his adoptive parents. Through Charlie's conversations and interactions with the ghosts in his home, we see both why he loved his parents and why he was so eager to leave them far behind.

Charlie's family was not dysfunctional or abusive. On the contrary, Charlie's parents adored him, and made great sacrifices to give him a good education. His Da, a gardener for a rich Anglo-Irish family, was kind and patient, but also woefully unsophisticated and lacking in ambition. Charlie loved Da, but was also embarrassed by him, and felt guilty for this embarrassment. Charlie was an illegitimate child at a time when this carried a heavy stigma in Catholic Ireland. Although Da accepted Charlie fully, Charlie always felt like an outsider, heavily indebted to Da. Moreover, Charlie never could find a way to repay Da or even fully express his love and gratitude.

The genial, undemanding Da was the polar opposite of Charlie's other father figure, Drumm, a high-level civil servant. Since Drumm was one of the few prosperous, educated Irishmen in the vicinity, Charlie's parents hoped he could find Charlie a job. In 1945, they invited Drumm to their home to introduce him to 17-year-old Charlie. The introduction went disastrously, as Da made a series of foolish, embarrassing statements (Da believed that a German victory in World War II was imminent, and he was plainly rooting for this outcome). Charlie was humiliated, and was astonished to learn that, despite everything, Drumm had actually taken a liking to him.

Drumm was intelligent, shrewd, and very pessimistic. He saw Charlie as the son he never had, and offered him the unsentimental advice to regard his Da as his enemy, someone who'd hold him back from succeeding in life. Drumm advised Charlie to emigrate from Ireland, which was no place for an ambitious young man. However, Charlie instead took a job as Drumm's clerk. He imagined the job would be only temporary, but he ended up working for Drumm for 14 years. Like his Da, Charlie kept an unprestigious, low-paying job far longer than he ever intended to.

In the late 1950s, as Charlie began to experience success as a writer, he unthinkingly snubbed Drumm in public; Drumm never forgave this crime, and turned against him. About the same time, Da's employers sold their home, leaving Da unemployed. They gave him a tiny pension and, as a parting gift, a tacky paperweight made from dozens of discarded eyeglasses. Da received the gift as a grand honor, which only increased Charlie's disdain for his father, a man who felt privileged to receive a worthless knickknack, so long as it came from "the Quality" upper classes.

Soon after, Charlie moved to England with his fiancée, and his adoptive mother died. Charlie visited Da regularly, giving him a few pounds for spending money, and begging the old man to come live with him in England. Da always refused, which hurt Charlie more than the old man could have realized.

After Da's death, Charlie receives a visit from Drumm, now an elderly man himself. Drumm still bears some ill will toward Charlie, but has been asked by Da to make sure that Charlie receives his inheritance. To Charlie's horror, the inheritance turns out to be the paperweight made of eyeglasses, and an envelope containing all the spending money Charlie had ever given to his Da.

Charlie is forced to accept that he could never repay his father. In fact, Da adored him, and selflessly gave him his entire legacy: the money and the paperweight. Charlie berates his father's ghost, pledging to leave Ireland forever, outraged that Da never accepted any help, and saddened that Da refused to move to England. The ghost decides to make up for lost time, and come back to England with Charlie. As the play ends, Charlie leaves his house with the ghost following him. His Da will always remain a powerful presence in his life.

== Accolades ==
Awards

- 1978 Tony Award for Best Play
- 1978 Drama Desk Award for Outstanding New Play
- 1978 New York Drama Critics' Circle Award for Best Play
- 1978 Outer Critics Circle Award for the Most Outstanding Play of the New York Season

== Film adaptation ==
The film adaptation of 1988 retained Ireland as the primary setting. Playwright Hugh Leonard wrote the screenplay, adding material from his memoir. In addition, he slightly rewrote the main character, Charlie, as an Irishman who had emigrated to the United States many years earlier, to permit casting of actor Martin Sheen in the role without his being forced to attempt a British or Irish accent. Playwright Hugh Leonard had a cameo in the film as one of the pallbearers carrying the coffin of Charlie's father.
