= Toast (play) =

Play written by Richard Bean

- Original language: English
- Written by: Richard Bean
- Characters: Lance; Colin; Peter; Walter Nelson (Nellie); Cecil; Blakey; Dezzie
- Setting: The canteen of a bread factory

Premiere
- Date: 1999
- Place: United Kingdom

Toast is a play written in 1999 by English playwright Richard Bean. It premiered at the Royal Court Theatre, London in 1999. The play tells the story of seven men who all work in a bread factory in Hull. One Sunday night, Nellie is so worn down from a lifetime making dough, he loses his vest in the mix.

== Original cast ==
- Christopher Campbell - Lance
- Ian Dunn - Colin
- Matthew Dunster - Peter
- Ewan Hooper - Walter Nelson (Nellie)
- Sam Kelly - Cecil
- Mark Williams - Blakey
- Paul Wyett - Dezzie

== 2007 revival ==
March 2007 at Hull Truck Theatre, Directed by Gareth Tudor-Price.

- Jonathan Hansler - Lance
- Andrew Whitehead - Colin
- Paul Popplewell - Peter
- Edward Peel - Walter Nelson (Nellie)
- Martin Barrass - Cecil
- Andy Fox - Blakey
- Patrick Connolly - Dezzie

== 2014 revival ==
August 2014 at The Park Theatre, Directed by Eleanor Rhode for Snapdragon Productions.

- Matthew Kelly - Walter Nelson (Nellie)
- Simon Greenall - Cecil
- Steve Nicolson - Blakey
- Will Barton - Colin
- Matt Sutton - Peter
- Finlay Robertson - Dezzie
- John Wark - Lance

On 9 September 2015 it was announced that Snapdragon Productions's 2014 revival would embark on a UK Tour and transfer to the Brits off Broadway Festival in 2016 with Kieran Knowles taking over the role of Dezzie.
