= Dalkey Castle =

Municipal building in Dalkey, Dublin, Ireland

- Caisleán Deilginis
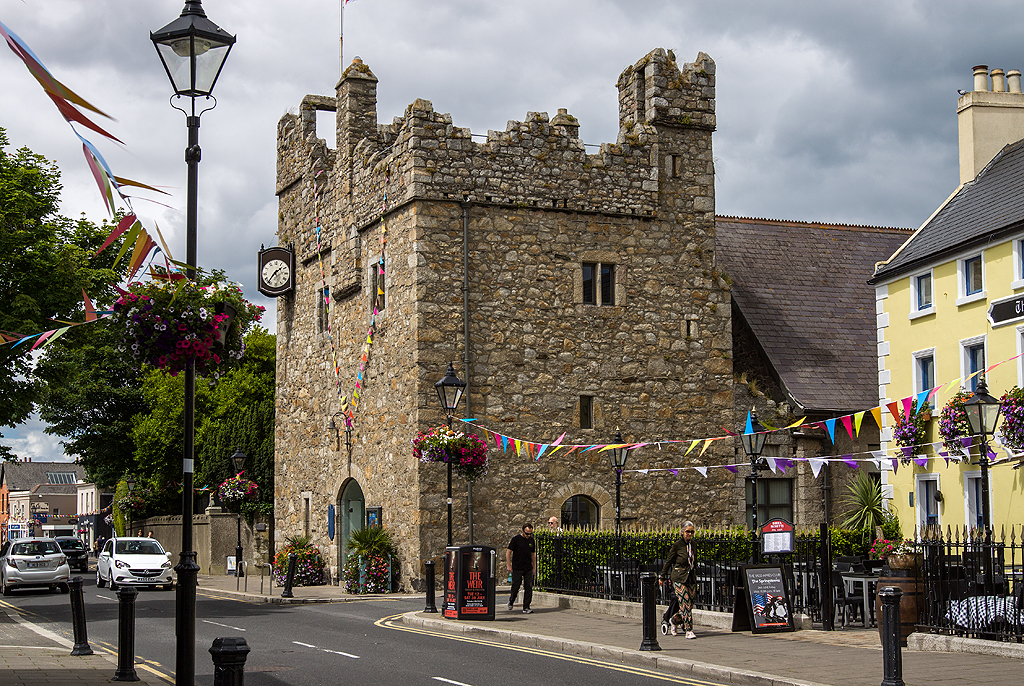
- Dalkey Castle (and part of the single-storey Dalkey Town Hall, with the steeply pitched roof, showing in the centre-right of the photograph)

- Location within Dublin

General information
- Architectural style: Norman style
- Location: Castle Street, Dalkey, Ireland
- Coordinates: 53.2779°N 6.1055°W
- Completed: The castle: 1390; The town hall: 1890

Flag flown from the castle's ramparts. The three goats are taken from the arms of the Chevers family, who occupied the castle in the 17th century.

Dalkey Castle (Irish: Caisleán Deilginis), formerly known as Goat Castle, is a medieval structure in Castle Street, Dalkey, Dublin, Ireland. The complex currently accommodates the Dalkey Heritage Centre, which is in the castle itself, and Dalkey Town Hall, which is formed by a single storey extension behind the original building.

== History ==
The building was commissioned by local merchants as a fortified warehouse to protect goods being transported to and from central Dublin. It was designed in the typical Norman style, built in rubble masonry and was completed in around 1390. The merchants built a total of seven castles, of which the only other surviving example is Archbold's Castle. The design involved a three-storey structure facing onto Castle Street. It was fenestrated by lancet windows and featured machicolation and castellation on all sides. Internally, the principal rooms were a chamber with a vaulted ceiling on the ground floor, and two further large spaces on the first and second floors.

The castle was acquired by the Chevers family in the 17th century and became known as Goat Castle (Chevre being French for goat). Walter Chevers lived there until he died in 1678. It was subsequently owned by the Allen family until it passed to Sir William Mayne in the mid-18th century.

After significant population growth, largely associated with its development as a residential suburb of Dublin, the township of Dalkey appointed town commissioners in 1863. The new town commissioners acquired the castle and used the first floor space as a council chamber from 1869. In around 1890, the town commissioners decided to erect an extension to accommodate public meetings: a new single-storey building was constructed, extending back for six bays along White's Villas. It was accessed through the ground floor of the castle and became known as "Dalkey Town Hall". In 1899, the town commissioners were replaced by an urban district council, with the first floor space in the castle becoming the meeting place of the new council. However, the castle ceased to be the local seat of government in 1930, when Dalkey became part of the borough of Dún Laoghaire.

The town hall became an important venue for public meetings: the Irish republican and leader of Fianna Fáil, Éamon de Valera, gave a speech at a political rally in the town hall in the 1930s. It was also a venue for concerts and the theatrical performances: the dramatist, Hugh Leonard, was inspired to write plays after attending a performance of The Colleen Bawn by Dion Boucicault in the town hall in the 1940s. The castle was restored in the mid-1990s and incorporated into a new heritage centre for the town which was officially opened there on 18 June 1998.
