= Jez Bond =

British theatre director

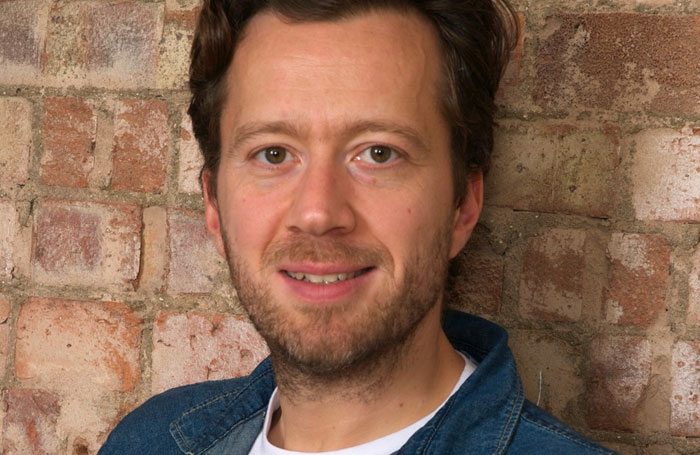
- Born: 1977 (age 48–49); Kingston-upon-Thames
- Occupation: Theatre director

Jez Bond (born 1977) is a British theatre director. One of the cohort of artistic directors born in the 1960s and 70s who are now running significant UK theatres, he opened the Park Theatre in Finsbury Park, London in 2013.

== Influences and theatre education ==
Jeremy “Jez” Bond was born in Surrey, England. His early interest in the stage was sparked by his father, who took him to see a wide range of productions both in London and in regional theatres. He gained practical experience as a teenager at Oundle School, Northamptonshire, whose students are given wide opportunities to run the local Stahl Theatre. As well as learning to build sets and rig lights and sound, Bond was given responsibility for letting touring companies such as the National Theatre into the building, allowing him to become acquainted with many theatre professionals. He finished his secondary studies at Dulwich School, where he gained further extra-curricular experience at the Edward Alleyn Theatre. He later completed a BA (Hons) in Drama from Hull University.

== Early career ==
Bond initially worked for Finsbury Park-based Y Touring Theatre Company, managing and co-directing touring plays in the late 1990s and early 2000s. In 2002 he co-founded Stages International with Charles J. Fourie, directing Fourie’s Big Boys at the Croydon Warehouse. In 2005, Bond was awarded a residency under the Regional Theatre Young Director Scheme at the Watford Palace Theatre where he directed J.B. Priestly’s I Have Been Here Before and was assistant director to Lawrence Till on several plays. As a freelance director, his productions included Sleeping Beauty at Salisbury Playhouse, Brenda Gottsche's The Max Factor at the Baron’s Court Theatre, London, and Roald Dahl's The Twits which toured in Switzerland. In 2008 he directed a semi-professional production of Oliver! starring Rowan Atkinson at Oxford’s Summer Fields prep school.

== Park Theatre ==
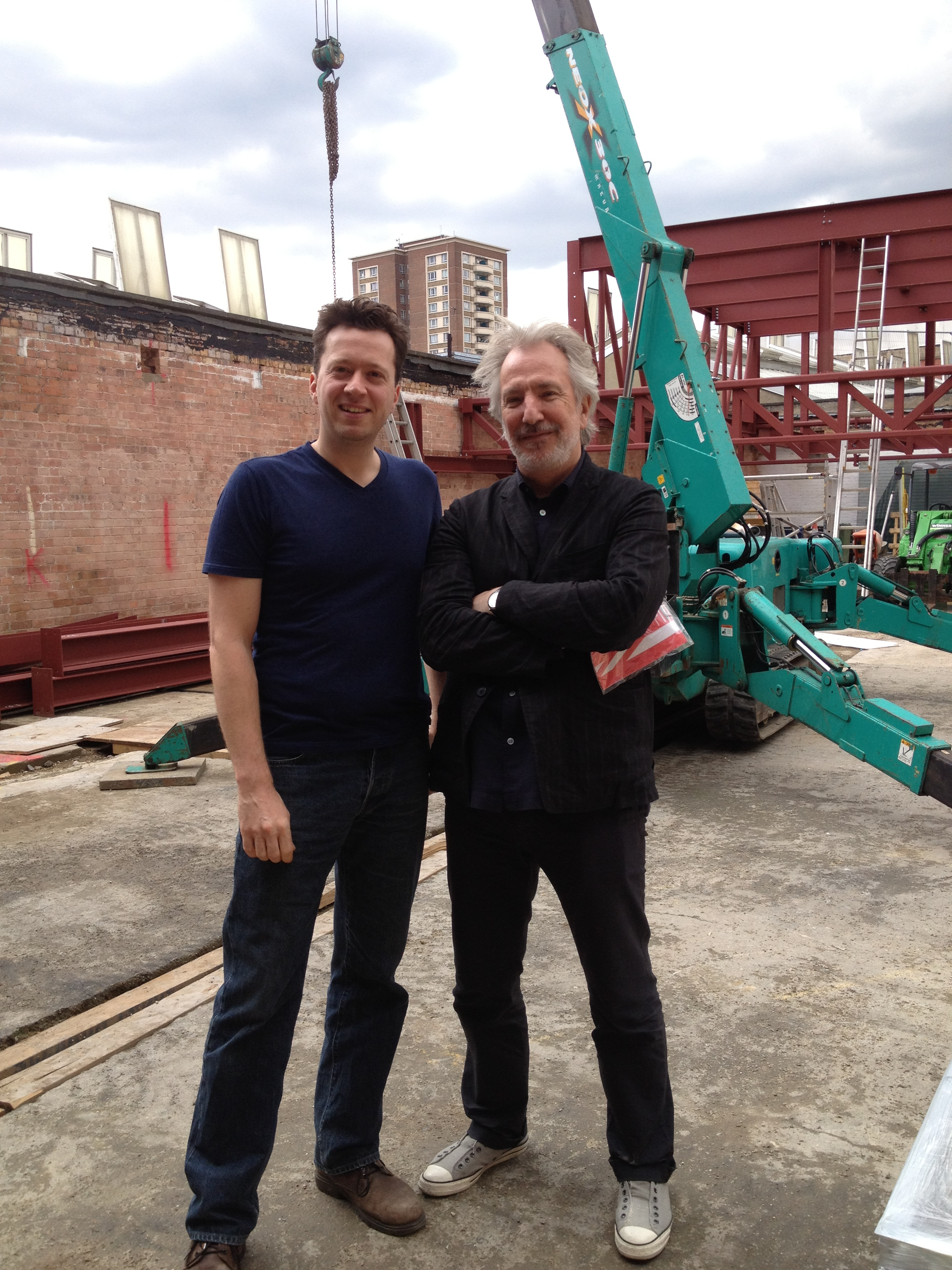
Bond with the late Alan Rickman on the roof of Park Theatre during construction period in 2012

While at Hull University, Bond met Melli Marie, an American actor studying for an MA in theatre. The two conceived a plan to create a new theatre, and began scouting possible sites and funding sources. In 2010, they were able to put a down payment on a disused building near Finsbury Park station and begin its conversion into a theatre containing two auditoria of 200 and 90 seats. Following a high-profile fundraising campaign, Park Theatre opened in May 2013, earning Bond the accolade of "an entrepreneur in the Victorian style, a self-made theatrical industrialist who builds things from the ground up."

In the theatre’s first season, Bond directed a new play by Sarah Rutherford, Adult Supervision, and a Christmas “anti-panto”, Sleeping Beauty, which he wrote with actor Mark Cameron. Bond also directed the 2014 and 2015 Christmas shows, Jack and the Beanstock and Rapunzel, both co-written with Cameron. In May 2015, Bond directed Hurling Rubble at the Moon, one segment of Avaes Mohammad's double bill about radicalization in the UK. In April 2017 Bond directed Miriam Margolyes in the world premiere of John Misto’s Madame Rubenstein, based on the story of cosmetics entrepreneur Helena Rubinstein. 2018 saw Bond direct Robert Schenkkan's post-Trump dystopia Building the Wall. He also directed the first English-language production of Jean Poiret's La Cage aux Folles (play), translated by Simon Callow, in February 2020.

While in its early years the majority of plays produced at the theatre were financed by external production companies, with Park Theatre acting as the host venue, Bond's intention was always to stage more in-house productions as financing became available, leading the theatre to devise innovative fundraising strategies. In July 2017, Bond directed Ian McKellen's one-man show, Shakespeare, Tolkien, Others & You, a fundraiser for the theatre that ran for eleven performances.

The McKellen show and other fundraising efforts having permitted Park Theatre to produce more in-house productions each year. The theatre stages Whodunnit (Unrehearsed), in which celebrity actors donate their time for one-off performances, in a murder mystery scripted by Bond and actor Mark Cameron. The theatre presented new scripts in 2019, 2022, 2024 and 2026. Praising the show but lamenting the need for such fundraising, The Daily Telegraph commented that “The hero of the day is Bond; the true villain our tight-fisted and complacent funding authorities.”
