= Sylvia O'Brien (actress) =

American actress

Sylvia F. Seader (born Sylvia Freda Carroll; May 4, 1924 – May 10, 2006), known professionally as Sylvia O'Brien, was an Irish-born American actress and singer. Little is known of her personal life. She was the daughter of Cyril and Emily (née Grey) Carroll, who may have hailed from the Ascendancy that largely ceased to exist following the establishment of the Irish Free State in 1922, following the Irish War of Independence. She died six days after her 82nd birthday. She became a United States citizen in 1965.

== Career ==
She made her way to New York and appeared in numerous stage productions on Broadway, the last one being the musical Me and My Girl. According to the Internet Broadway Database, she appeared in the following Broadway productions.

- Me and My Girl (musical) as "Maria" (8/10/86 - 12/31/89)
- Da (drama) as "Mother" (5/1/78 - 1/1/80)
- My Fair Lady (musical revival) as "Mrs. Pearce" (03/25/76 - 2/20/77)
- Dear Oscar (comedy) as "Comtesse" (11/16/72 - 11/19/72)
- Conduct Unbecoming (drama) as "Mrs. Mem Strang" (10/12/70 - 2/14/71)
- Hadrian VII (drama) as "Agnes" and "Mrs. Crowe" (standby; 1/8/69 - 11/15/69)
- The Loves of Cass McGuire (comedy) as "Alice" (10/6/66 - 10/22/66)
- The Passion of Josef D. (drama) (2/11/64 - 2/22/64; ensemble)

== Death ==
Notice of O'Brien's death was not publicly released and the only mention was a tiny paid personal obituary in the Sunday New York Times (May 14, 2006), which was very poorly composed and went as follows: "Singer starred on Broadway in "DA" appeared in numerous other productions, Television and Films. She leaves her daughter, Charmian and husband, Producer Richard Seader."
