= Jane Emily Herbert =

Irish poet (1821–1882)

Jane Emily Herbert (1821 – 26 May 1882) was an Irish poet who, in her time, was hailed as the legitimate successor, in the female line, to the laurel vacant since the death of Felicia Hemans in 1835.

== Early life and family ==
Jane Emily Herbert was born to parents Henry Monckton Herbert and Elizabeth Jane Barlow. In 1839 her father kept a school in Arklow, County Wicklow, as evidenced by an article that appeared in The Freeman's Journal of 8 November 1839, while her mother and some of her siblings attended to the farm of about 50 acres. The article states the family moved in a respectable station in society. Her mother, Elizabeth Jane, was a sister of Arthur Craven Barlow, Esq., of Saunders Court & Mt Anna in Wexford, and Thomas William Barlow, Esq.,(as evidenced by the dedication in The Bride of Imael which reads: "To my widowed mother and her brothers Arthur Craven Barlow and Thomas William Barlow Esq., of Dublin"). Both were prominent in society, the latter being for many years the solicitor for the Board of Ordnance in Ireland, and both married into the Jeffares family of Wexford. Following the death of Arthur's first wife, Susannah, about one year after their marriage, he married Dorothy Cooper, daughter of John Cooper of Birchgrove, Wexford. Their children immigrated to New Zealand, while most of Thomas William and Ann Jeffare's children immigrated to Australia.

== Published works ==
=== Poetical Recollections of Irish History ===
Her earliest published work Poetical Recollections of Irish History in 1842, which she wrote at age only 22, was hailed by many of which the following are samples:

- "Miss Herbert evidently possesses the true heart of an Irish patriot and may compete with Mrs Hemans in the sweetness and beauty of her versification - Every striking character and event is made the subject of a poem, so that with the aid of explanatory notes, the reader is furnished with a really interesting and complete poetical picture of Irish history." - Edinburgh Advertiser
- "The merits of some of the poems are unequal; many of them now real gems. The fair authoress has "wedded to immortal verses" some of the most interesting passages and characters in Irish history, and embalmed them in song." - Monitor
- "The historical events and scenes described in this volume will render it very attractive to the young in impressing facts on their minds in language which is usually recollected when prior compositions are quite forgotten." - Weekly Warden

=== The Bride of Imael ===
Of her work The Bride of Imael; or Irish Love and Saxon Beauty, the Dublin Evening Mail of 28 January 1848, quotes Benjamin Disraeli thus, "A beautiful volume, in which I found grace and fancy, a melodious ear, and the healthy interest of a National subject."

The following are samples of further quotes pertaining to this particular work:

- "Her poem is written with spirit and freshness. The lines are musical and flowing-the moralities of the right kind-and the sympathies large." - Athenaeum, 1 May 1847
- "Beyond a doubt Miss Herbert is now the legitimate successor, in the female line, to the laurel vacant by the death of Mrs Hemans. ... Her lyre resounds with the music of almost every species of English heroical metre and in all shows the facility of a practiced mind." - Dublin Evening Mail
- "Miss Herbert's muse has already done her country some service. She has sung many of the leading incidents of ancient Irish history in strains of great sweetness and rare poetic merit. The subject of the present volume is on a kindred topic." - Edinburgh Advertiser

On 24 July 1853, in the Exeter and Plymouth Gazette the following article was recorded:

"We are happy to be able to state that Miss Herbert the clever authoress of The Bride of Imael, and one of whose productions we published a few weeks since, is nearly restored to health. She has been staying a short time on a visit to her brother the Rev. T. W. Herbert, in St. Thomas, where she was taken dangerously ill, and left this (Friday) morning for Bristol."

=== Ione's Dream, and Other Poems ===
Ione's Dream, and other poems was published in 1853 and positively reviewed in the Dublin University Magazine and others. The following quotes from some of the literary critics of the day appeared in the Dublin Evening Mail of 5 August 1853:

- "The same rich vein of imagery and smooth, abundant, fluency of diction, which characterised Miss Herbert's earlier productions, mark Ione's Dream and the other poems of the present volume. These qualities, as well as the genuine Irish feeling and true womanly tenderness, which we recognised The Bride of Imael, we again gladly welcome as proofs we committed no error in judgement in thinking, when we first made acquaintance with the fair author's muse, that the mantle of Mrs Hemans had not remained unappropriated." - Dublin Evening Mail
- "Containing many passages of great poetical beauty. 'A Dirge for Wellington', which concludes the volume, will be gladly welcomed by all lovers of true poetry as an oasis in the desert of our material literature." - Liverpool Standard
- "In this highly interesting volume, abundant proofs are given of the fertile, we might say gorgeous, imagination, and the ready corresponding power of language of the fair authoress. If our commendation can afford any gratification, we willingly offer it, especially as regards the very great power both of thought and language, of which she evidently possesses so large a fund." - Sentinel

Ione's Dream was also a part of David Scott Mitchell's personal collection. He was founder and benefactor of The Mitchell Library, Sydney.

=== A Short History of Ireland ===
A Short History of Ireland from the Earliest Periods to the Year 1798 apparently first appeared in 1886. A Short History of Ireland, from 400 to the year 1829, published in 1887, was reported to be "a posthumous work by the late Miss Herbert, a lady who in her day was well known as an accomplished writer of verse, and who in all she wrote showed the keen interest she felt in the past history of our country."

== Siblings ==
Jane Emily was one of five siblings.

- Henry Arthur Augustus Herbert (1808–1848) a Master Mariner who married Matilda Elizabeth Lacy. They had five daughters, Jane Emily, Helen Matilda, Matilda Elizabeth, Louisa Anne and Alice Sabrina. Henry died in Calcutta, India, in 1848 and in 1862 his wife and 4 of their daughters immigrated to Brisbane, Australia, on the ship Baywater. Their 5th daughter Louisa immigrated there in 1864 on the ship Conway with her mother's widowed sister, Mary Ann Kalb (née Lacy) and her son Ferdinand
- Elizabeth Herbert (1809–1888) remained unmarried and died at the home of her brother George in Rockingham, Dalkey, Dublin.
- George Herbert (1814–1891) a publisher and a prominent book seller in Grafton Street, Dublin. He was book seller to his Excellency the Lord Lieutenant as was evidenced by the article in the Dublin Evening Mail of 28 November 1866. He remained unmarried and died at his home in Rockingham, Dalkey, Dublin.
- Rev Thomas William Herbert (1819–1902) studied at Trinity College, Dublin. He was married firstly to Fanny White and secondly, following the death of Fanny, to Charlotte Christina Miller. At the time of his death on 14 September 1902, he was the much revered venerable Vicar of Southend as evidenced by the report of his funeral that appeared in the Essex Newman on 27 September 1902. It was attended by the Bishop of Barking and numerous clergy, the Mayor and Southend Corporation, as well as by his large and devout congregation. He was without issue.

== Later life ==
Herbert married the surgeon Thomas Mills in the Parish of Monkstown on 11 November 1858. According to their Church Marriage Record her address was Kingstown at that time, while the address for Thomas is given as Staffordshire. To date not much is known of Thomas, other than his occupation and that he was a son of Thomas Mills who was recorded as being a "gentleman".

Jane Emily Herbert (Mills) was recorded as a widow on her death record when she died of heart failure at home in Moryn Lodge, Sorrento Road, Dalkey, Dublin, on 26 May 1882.
