= Arden Fingerhut =

American lighting designer (1945–1994)

Daisy Arden Fingerhut, known as Arden Fingerhut (1945–1994) was an American stage and lighting designer. She was also a theatre academic at Williams College.

== Life ==
Arden Fingerhut was born in 1945, and grew up in St. Louis Park, Minnesota. She was an undergraduate at New York University and received an M.F.A. in design from Columbia University. She married Dennis McHugh, and had a daughter Maude.

Fingerhut designed the lighting for dozens of Broadway and off-Broadway productions, including Da, Bent, Hay Fever, Plenty and Driving Miss Daisy. She also designed the lighting for regional companies such as the Long Wharf Theatre in New Haven, Connecticut, and the Williamstown Theatre Festival. In 1982 Fingerhut received an Obie Award for sustained excellence in lighting design.

From 1987 until her death in 1994 she was a professor of theatre at Williams College, where she also served as a chairman of the theatre department. She was a trustee of the Williamstown Theatre Festival and a director of the Theatre Communications Group in New York.

Fingerhut died of breast cancer at the North Adams Regional Hospital on May 13, 1994.

== Works ==
- Theatre: Choice in Action. 1985.
