= Dalkey =

Suburb of Dublin, Ireland

Dalkey Deilginis (Irish)
- Suburb (village core)
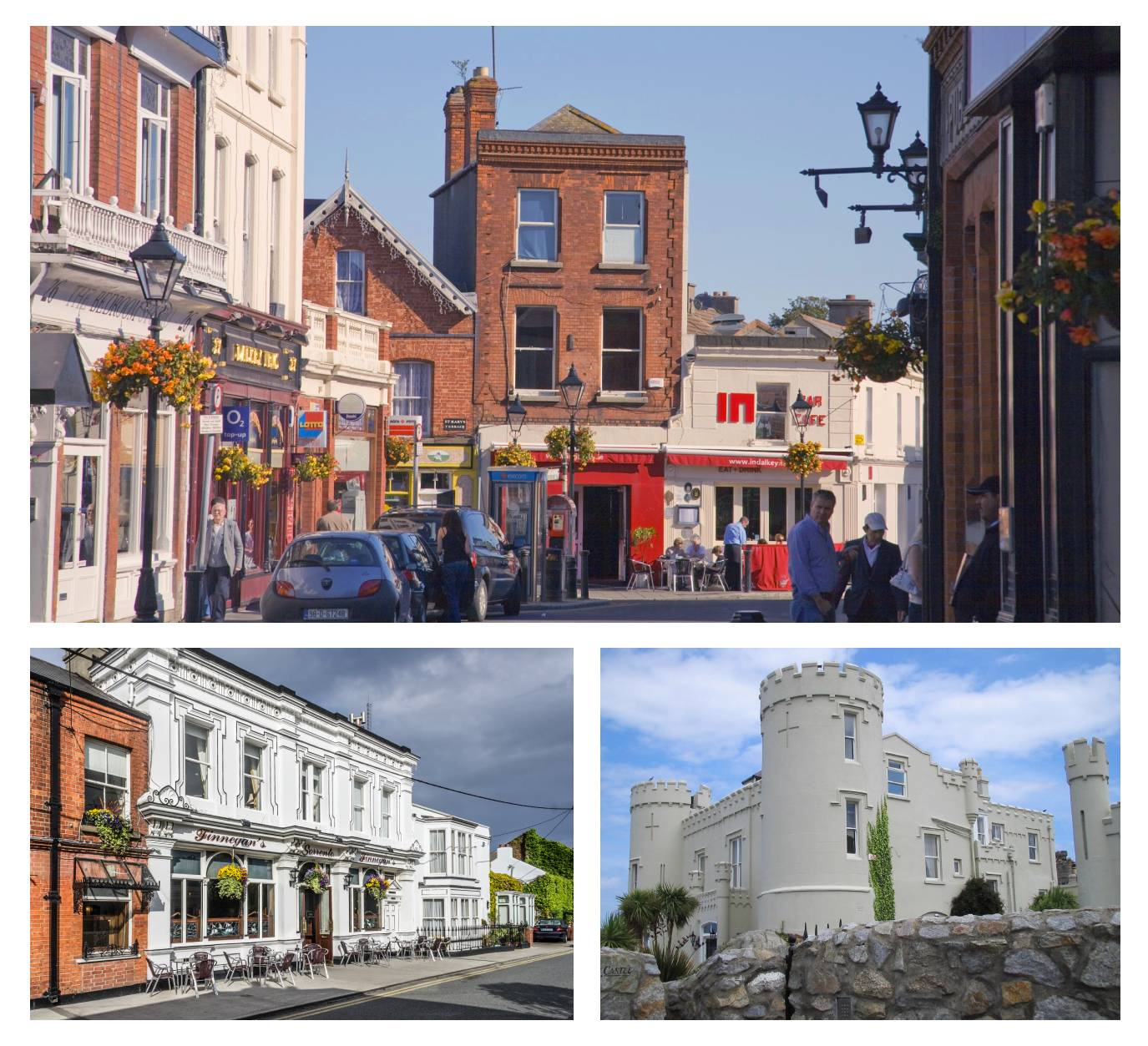
- Clockwise from top: Castle Street looking towards Convent Road; a home near Vico Road; Finnegan's pub

- Location in Ireland Dalkey (Ireland)
- Coordinates: 53.276°N 6.104°W
- Country: Ireland
- Province: Leinster
- County: County Dublin
- Local government area: Dún Laoghaire–Rathdown
- Elevation: 26 m (85 ft)

Population (2006)
  - Urban: 8,083
- Eircode routing key: A96
- Area code: 01 (+3531)
- Irish Grid Reference: O264267

Dalkey (/ˈdɔːki/ DAW-kee; Irish: Deilginis, meaning 'thorn island') is a suburban town in Dún Laoghaire–Rathdown county southeast of Dublin, Ireland. It was founded as a Viking settlement and became a port in the Middle Ages. According to chronicler John Clyn (c.1286–c.1349), it was one of the ports through which the plague entered Ireland in the mid-14th century. Dalkey lies within a townland and civil parish of the same name, in the barony of Rathdown.

One of Dublin's wealthiest districts, it has been home to writers, artists, and celebrities, including George Bernard Shaw, Jane Emily Herbert, Julius Olsson, Maeve Binchy, Robert Fisk, and Hugh Leonard.

== Etymology ==
The district is named after Dalkey Island, just offshore. The name is ultimately derived from the Irish: deilg 'thorn' and inis 'island', with ey the Old Norse (Viking) version of 'island'.

== Geography ==
Dalkey lies by the coast, between Dún Laoghaire (and Sandycove and Glasthule), Glenageary and Killiney. Off the coast are Dalkey Island (up to the 18th century, also "St. Begnet's Island"), Malden Rock, Clare Rock, Lamb Island, and, further offshore, The Muglins, which have their own lighthouse. The village core of the area is on fairly level land, but the district rises to Dalkey Hill (140m), the northern peak of a ridge which continues to Killiney Hill to the southwest; the two hills are now contained within the public park known as Killiney Hill Park. Along the coast are a natural harbour at Bullock, a couple of small inlets, Sorrento Point just east of the town proper, and the northern part of Killiney Bay.

Lead mines used to exist on the coast opposite Dalkey Island.

== History ==
One of the patron saints of Dalkey is St. Begnet, a probable seventh-century figure. A ruined church and a holy well on Dalkey Island are named for her, as is another ruined church near the town centre.

The main settlement, which was founded as a Viking community, became an active port during the Middle Ages.

Dalkey developed increasing strategic value as a port for bulk shipments bound for Dublin during the 15th century. The channel between Dalkey Island and the mainland provided ideal conditions for unloading galleons carrying heavy cargo due to its depth (relative to Dublin Bay) and its sheltered position. The treacherous shallows of Dublin Bay prevented direct shipments into the city centre, making Dalkey an ideal access point for trade.

Although seven 15th–16th-century castles were originally built in the area, by 1837 it was noted (in Samuel Lewis's Topographical Dictionary of Ireland) that:

Four of its ancient castles have been entirely destroyed, and the remains of three others which have been long dismantled, convey striking indications of their former importance; one has been converted into a private dwelling, another is used as a store, and the third as a carpenters shop.

Dalkey's remaining Norman castle is now in use as a heritage centre and town hall.

== Wildlife ==
Dalkey Island is home to a colony of seals, and a herd of wild goats also lives on the island. Birdwatch Ireland have established a colony of Roseate Terns on Maiden Rock just north of Dalkey Island. A pod of three bottlenose dolphins also frequents the waters around Dalkey Island.

== Local amenities ==
=== Harbours ===
There are several small harbours on the coast of Dalkey. Bulloch Harbour is the biggest; it is towards the northern part of Dalkey at Harbour Road and is a declared seal sanctuary. Coliemore Harbour is smaller and in the southern part of Dalkey at Coliemore Road. In the Middle Ages, Coliemore was the main harbour for Dublin City. Bulloch Harbour is still a working harbour with boats that fish for lobster and crab, and mackerel in season. It is also used by locals and tourists who hire boats for nearby fishing, sightseeing and getting to Dalkey Island.

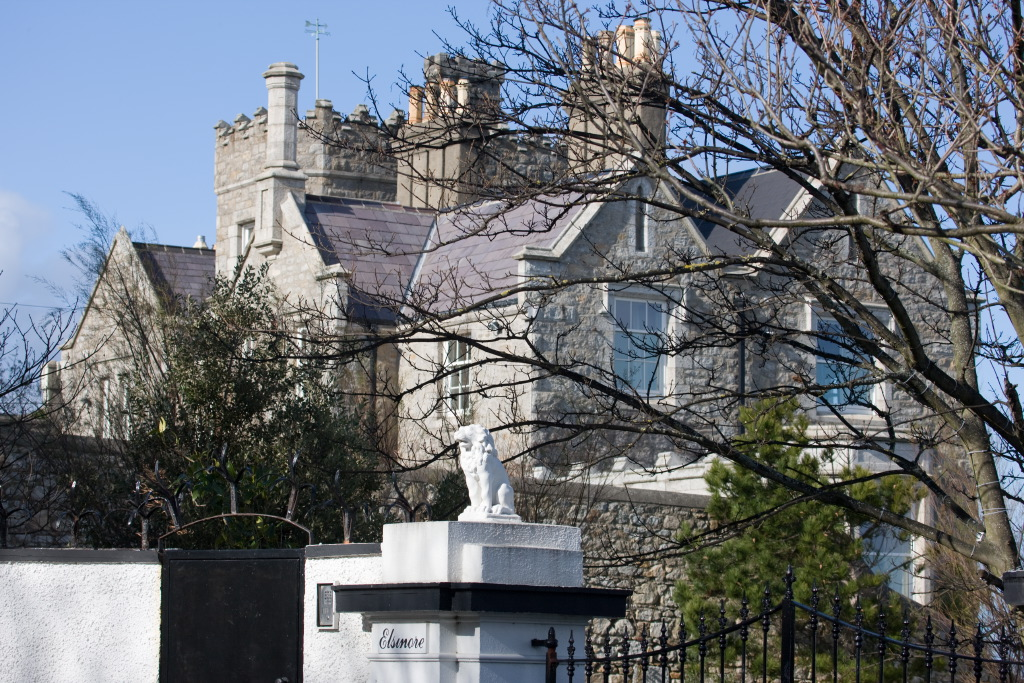
Dalkey is known for its elaborate seaside homes

=== Quarry ===
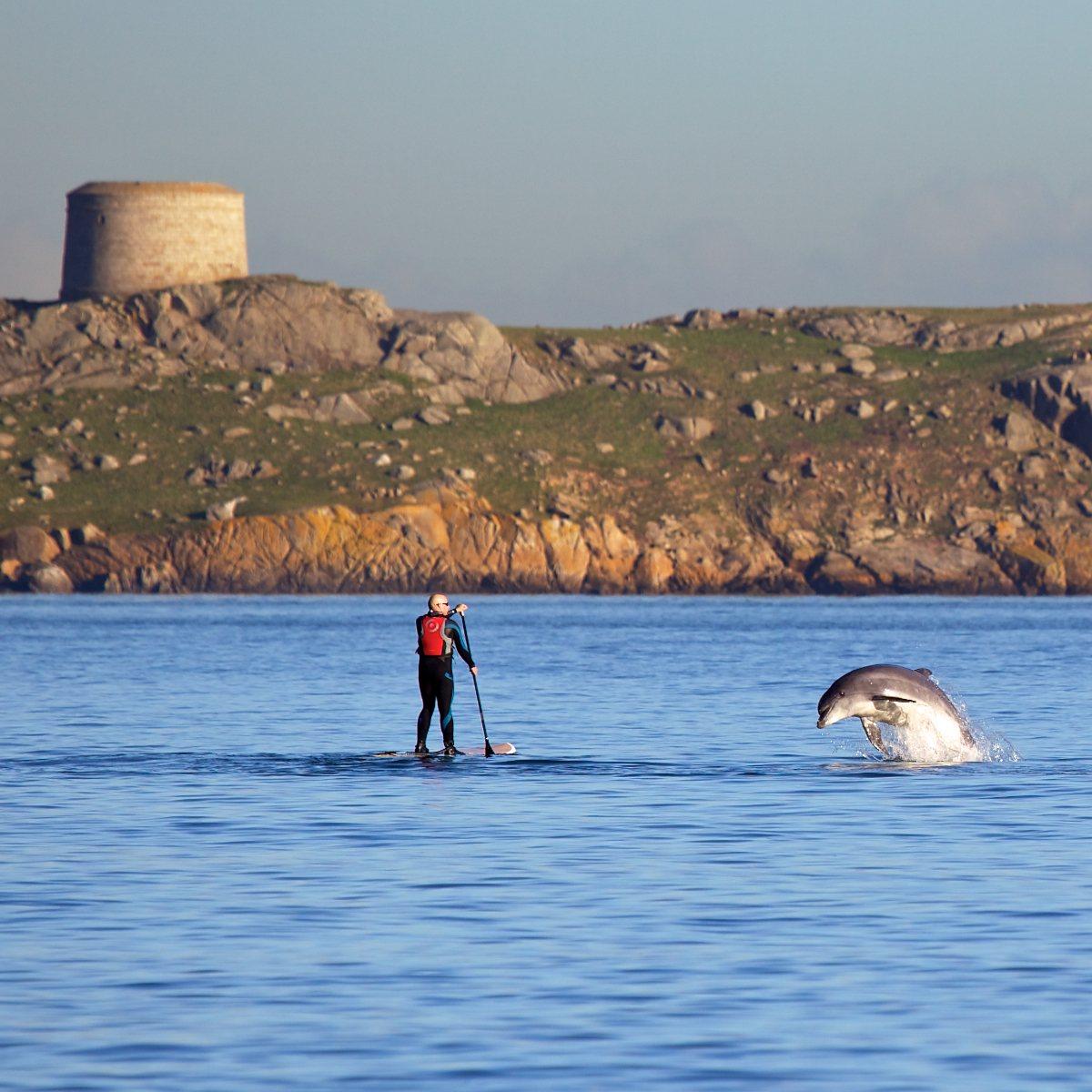
Bottlenose dolphin playing with a paddle boarder in front of Dalkey Island

Dalkey Quarry is a disused granite quarry, stone from which was used during the 19th century to build Dún Laoghaire Harbour, and is now a rock climbing location within Killiney Hill Park. During the building of the harbour, the quarry was connected to Dún Laoghaire via a metal tramway known as 'The Metals', some parts of which are still visible in some parts of Dalkey. Dalkey granite was also shipped by sea to Kylemore Abbey in Connemara, County Galway for the facade of the Abbey.

== Culture and tourism ==
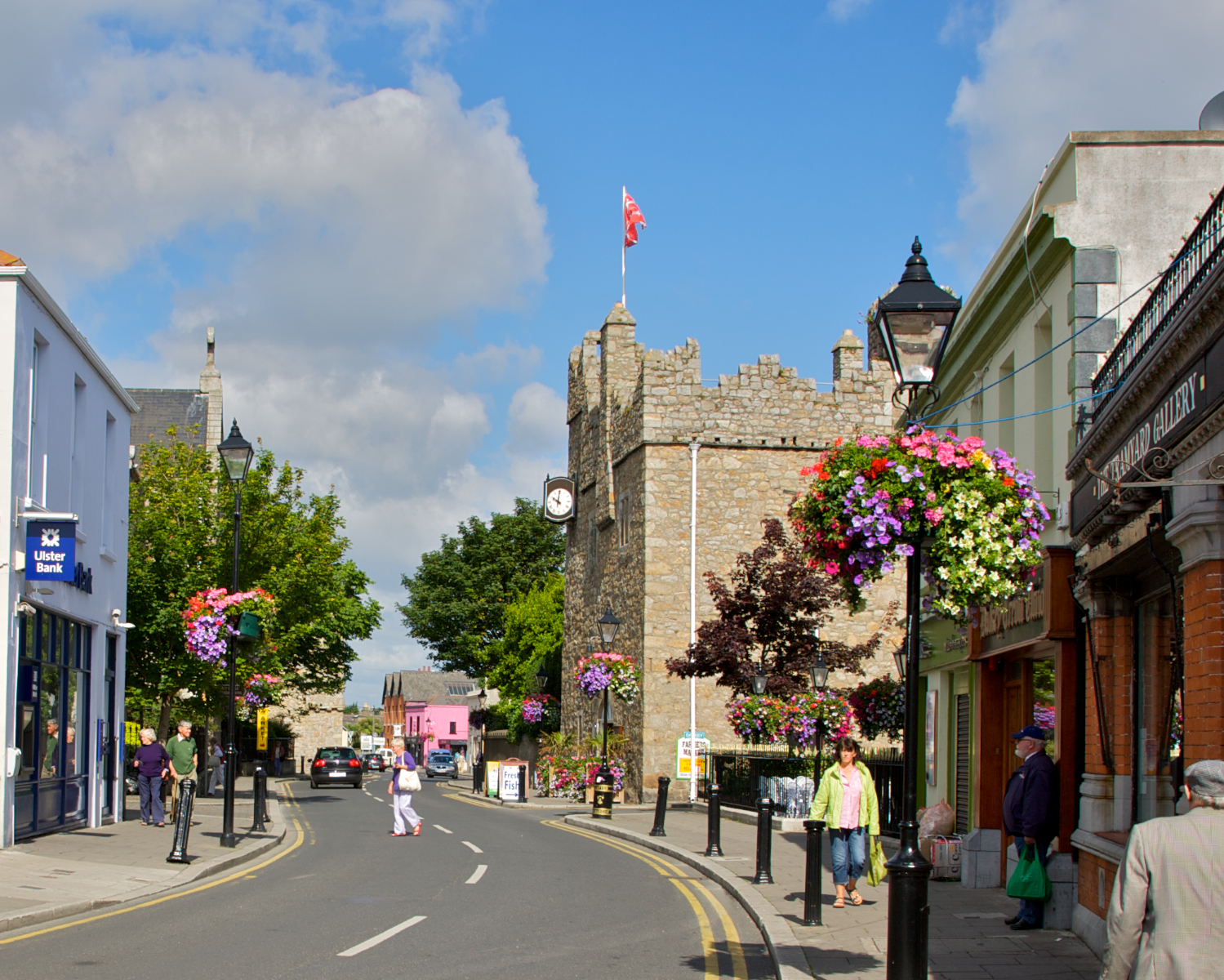
The Norman-era Dalkey Castle as seen from Castle Street, Dalkey

Dalkey's main street, Castle Street, has a tenth-century church and two fourteenth-century Norman castles, one of which, Goat's Castle, now known as Dalkey Castle, houses the local heritage centre and town hall (the other, Archbold's Castle, is private property). There are several scenic and historical walks and tours. The 3km long Dalkey and Killiney Hill Loop offers views over Dublin city, Dublin Bay, and towards the Dublin and Wicklow Mountains. The Killiney Hill summit is home to an obelisk and a pyramid structure, known locally as the "Wishing Stone".

Deilg Inis Living History Theatre Company runs live theatre performances every half-hour at Dalkey Castle and Heritage Centre. The castle's chambers and battlements can be explored via guided tour.

Boats are available to hire at Bulloch Harbour on Harbour Road and Yacht trips around Dalkey Island can be taken from nearby Dún Laoghaire Harbour. Dalkey Quarry is a rock climbing and abseiling venue. Killiney Hill is also used as a launch site for para-gliders.

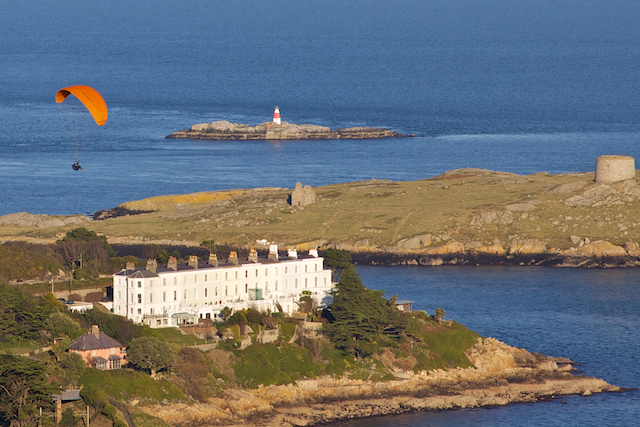
A paraglider at Killiney Hill, looking over Dalkey Island and the Georgian-era Sorrento Terrace

=== Annual festivals ===
Dalkey Book Festival is a literary festival that takes place over a weekend in mid-June every year. Its directors, David McWilliams and Sian Smyth, run the festival with a group of volunteers and the Dalkey Business Group. Festival contributors have included Salman Rushdie, Amos Oz, Seamus Heaney, Edna O'Brien, Roddy Doyle, Maeve Binchy, Joseph O'Connor, Tim Pat Coogan, Derek Landy, Jennifer Johnston, Robert Fisk and Dawn O'Porter.

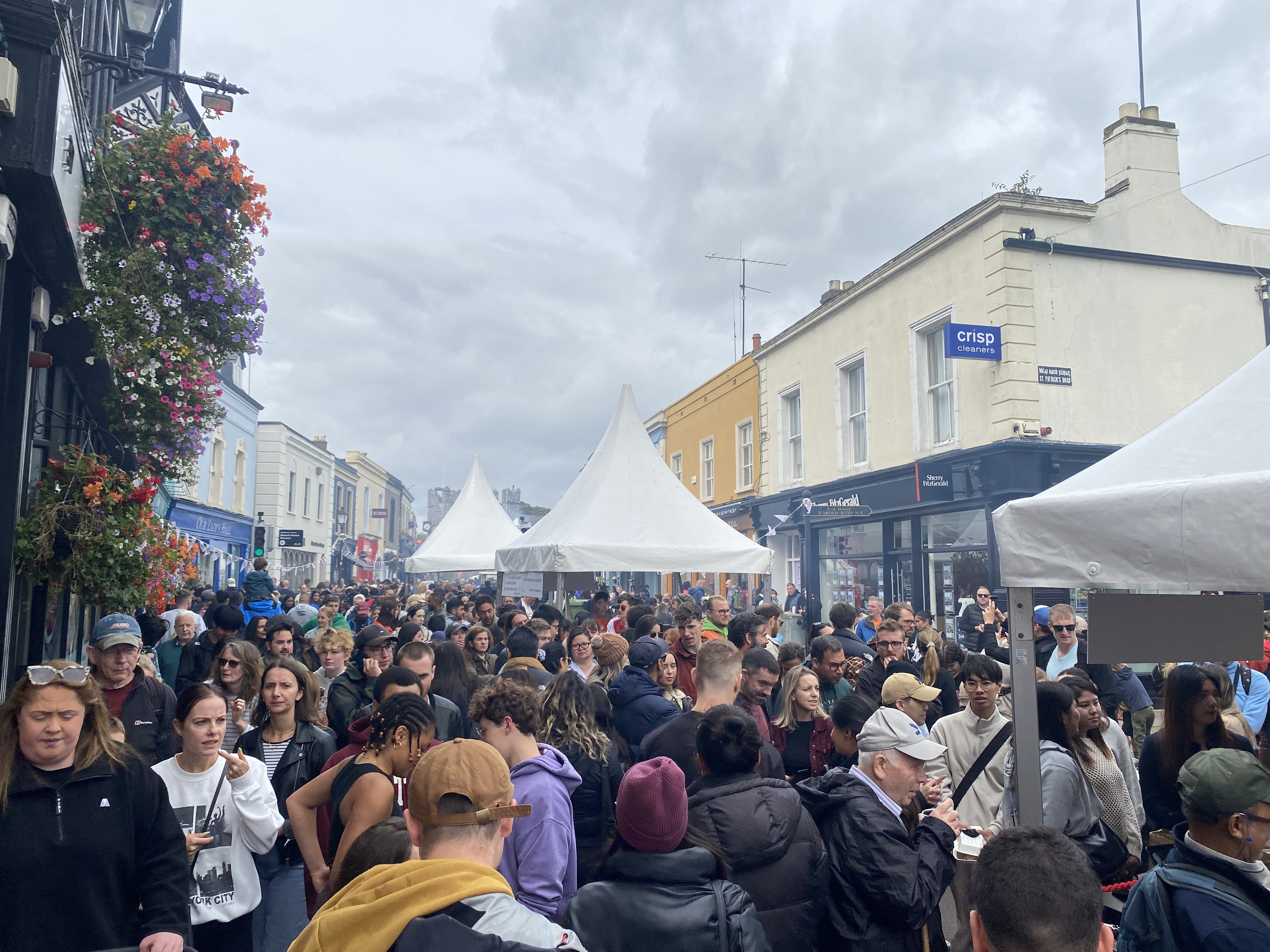
Dalkey Lobster Festival

The area also hosts the Dalkey Lobster Festival in late August, which "showcases local seafood and global jazz musicians".

== Education ==
There are 5 schools in Dalkey:

- Loreto Primary School caters for boys from junior infants through first class, and for girls from junior infants through sixth class.
- Loreto Abbey Secondary School caters for girls from first year through sixth year.
- Harold Boys' National School caters for boys from second class through sixth class.
- Saint Patrick's National School caters for boys and girls from junior infants through sixth class.
- Castle Park School is an independent school for boys and girls from Montessori to the end of primary school.

== Sports ==
Cuala CLG, a Gaelic Athletic Association sports club, and Dalkey United, an association football club, are both based at Hyde Park. Early in his soccer career, Paul McGrath played for Dalkey United. In the 1940s, the town produced another international footballer, Peter Farrell. It has set up an athletics club, the Dalkey Dashers. Dalkey Rowing Club is based at Coliemore Harbour and kayaking is taught at Bulloch. Dalkey has two scout groups: the 17th Dalkey Scouts, based in Hyde Park, were founded in 1927, and the 3rd Port Dalkey Sea Scouts keep two old sailing boats at Bulloch Harbour.

=== Swimming and diving ===
The Vico Bathing Place and Whiterock Beach, accessed off Vico Road, have changing shelters for sea swimmers.

Dalkey Sound and the islands beyond are used as scuba diving locations.

== Transport ==
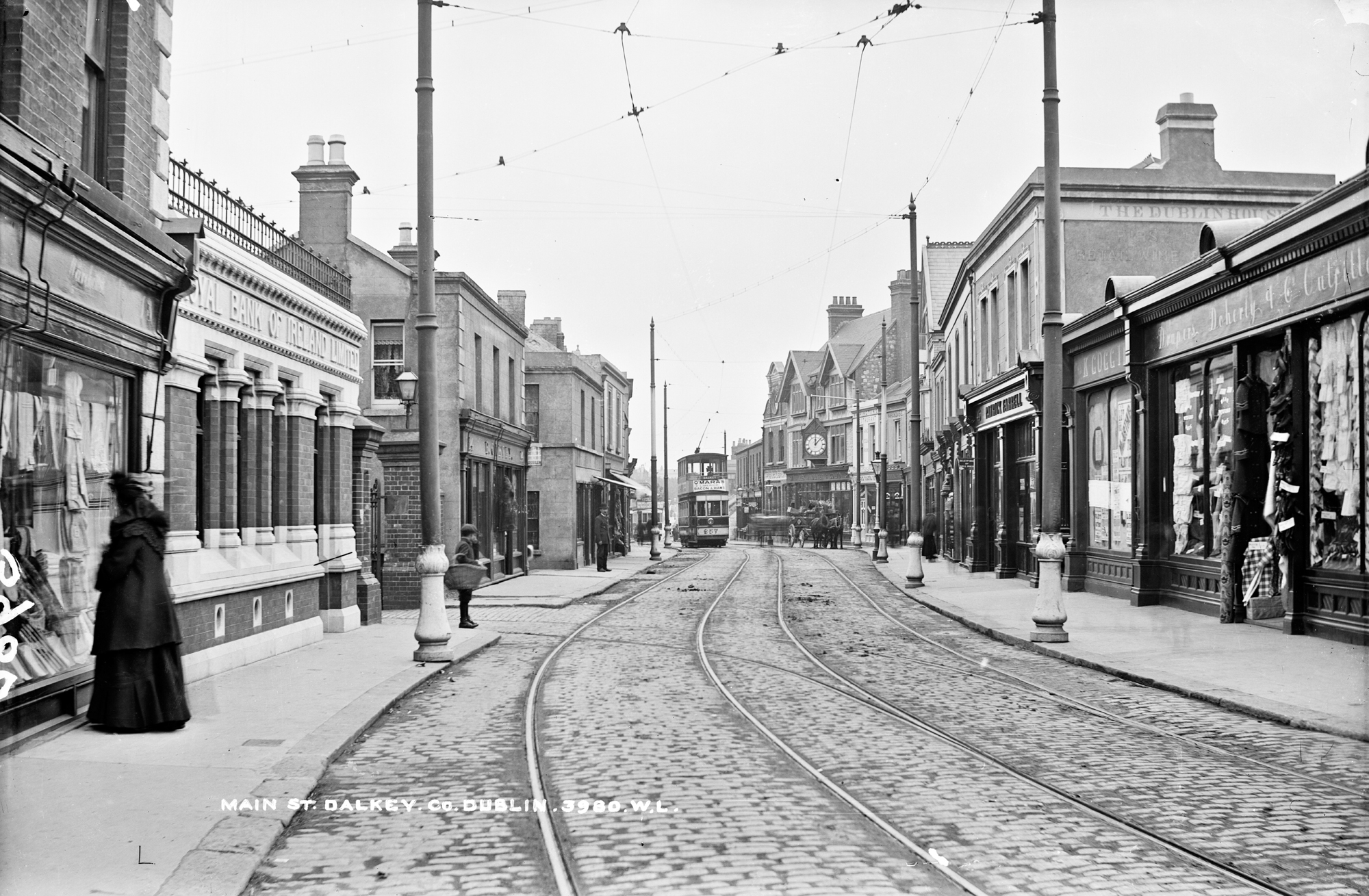
A tram in Dalkey in the early 20th century

The Dalkey Atmospheric Railway station at Atmospheric Road (29 March 1844 to 12 April 1854) was the terminus for the first commercial application of the atmospheric system of train propulsion.

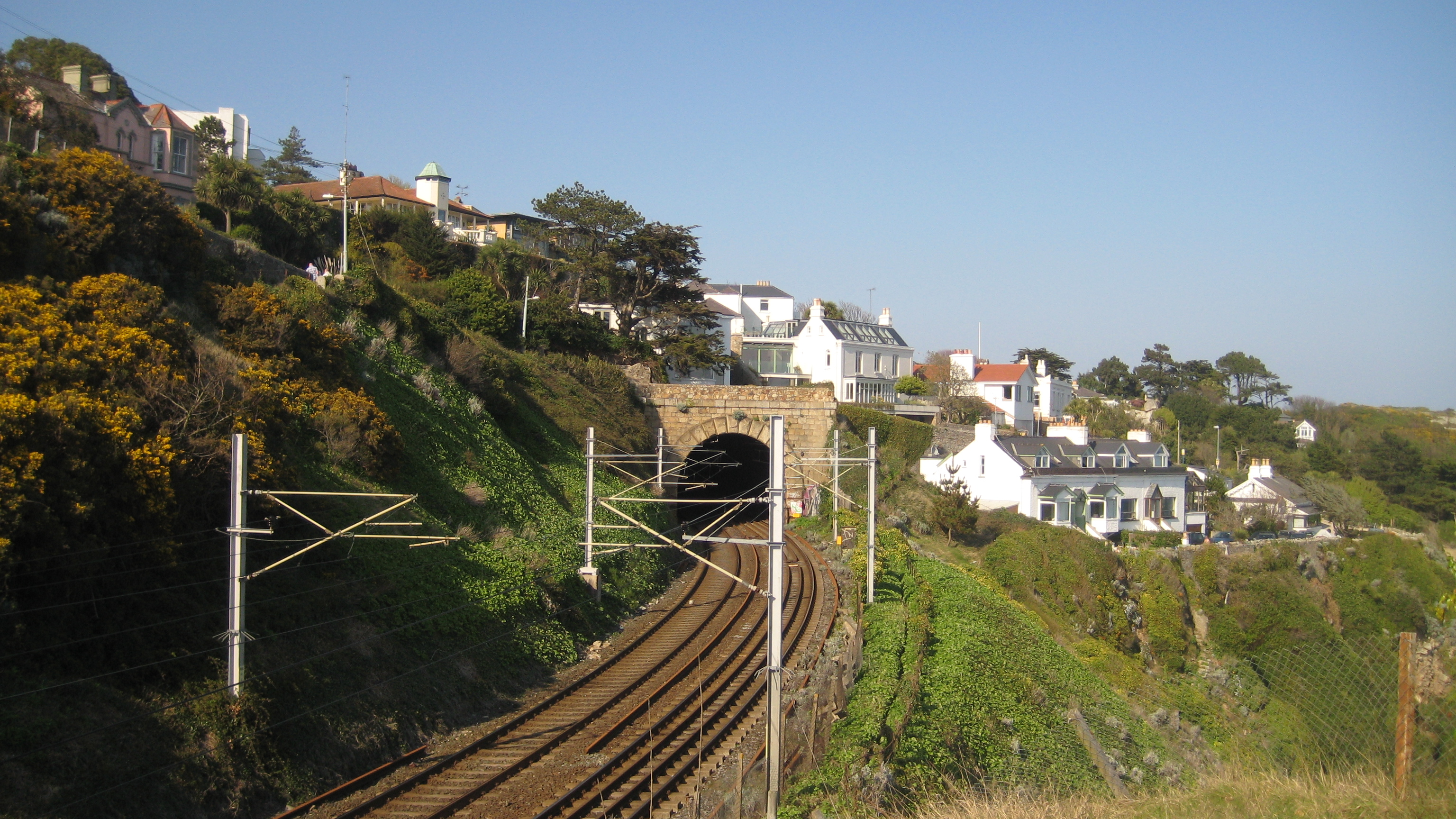
The railway line at Dalkey, looking north

The current Dalkey railway station was opened on 10 July 1854. The station is served by the DART electric rail system which affords quick access to and from Dublin city centre. Clifftop views of Dalkey Island and Killiney Bay are afforded as the train emerges from a short tunnel just south of Dalkey Station.

Dalkey was also the terminus for the Dublin tramways 8 route until the tram line ceased operations on 9 July 1949. The tram yard is now all that remains.

An Aircoach service with a stop at Hyde Road links the area with Dublin Airport. Go-Ahead Ireland and Dublin Bus services 7D (only operates early morning), 59 and 111 link the area with the nearby seaside town of Dún Laoghaire and the city centre.

== People ==
Dalkey is the original hometown of several Irish writers including novelists Maeve Binchy and playwright Hugh Leonard. George Bernard Shaw also had an association with the area and lived in Torca Cottage on Dalkey Hill from 1866 to 1874. It is also the setting for Flann O'Brien's novel The Dalkey Archive. Well-known Irish and international music figures — including Chris de Burgh and Lisa Stansfield — have also had residences in the area..

Pat Kenny, former host of RTÉ's flagship chat show The Late Late Show, is a resident, while former Formula One drivers Damon Hill and Eddie Irvine are former residents. Film director Neil Jordan lives locally.

Matt Damon, his wife and their three youngest daughters resided in Dalkey during the COVID-19 pandemic. Damon had arrived in Dalkey to shoot scenes in The Last Duel just before production on the film was suspended in March 2020.

Victoria Cross recipient Major William Leet was born in Dalkey.

== King of Dalkey ==
The King of Dalkey, a putative elective monarchy associated with Dalkey Island, is a local tradition which dates to at least 1787. It started when a group of freemen of Dalkey formed a club into which they brought wits, poets and thinkers. They summoned a "Pimlico Parliament", named after the Pimlico Liberty of Dublin, and "hurled broadsides" at the perceived pomposity of Dublin Castle from an assembly room.

Several thousand people reputedly attended the regal procession and coronation anniversary, on 20 August 1797, of Stephen Armitage (pawnbroker and printer) who was "King Stephen the First, King of Dalkey". The full title given was "His Facetious Majesty, King of Dalkey, Emperor of the Muglins, Prince of the Holy Island of Magee, Elector of Lambay and Ireland's Eye, Defender of his own Faith and Respecter of All Others, Sovereign of the Illustrious Order of the Lobster and Periwinkle". The coronation ceremony was held, with "mock gravity and ceremony", in St. Begnet's Church on Dalkey Island.

Although the tradition of electing a "mock king of Dalkey" was interrupted around the time of the 1798 Rebellion, it was revived in 1850, 1934, in 1965 and again in 1983. As of 2014, the title was held by the local sacristan, Finbarr Madden.

While the current custom is dated to 1787, local tradition also holds that a Hugh Dempsey had been crowned "King of Dalkey" about 1780.

== Local government ==
Dalkey is recorded as having received a charter of incorporation by 1358. Under the Local Government (Ireland) Act 1898, the Township of Dalkey became an urban district in 1899. The urban district of Dalkey was abolished in 1930, becoming part of the borough of Dún Laoghaire. The borough was abolished in 1994, on the establishment of the county of Dún Laoghaire–Rathdown. The electoral divisions (EDs) of Dalkey–Bullock, Dalkey–Coliemore, Dalkey Hill and Dalkey Upper are in the local electoral area (LEA) of Dún Laoghaire, while the ED of Dalkey–Avondale is the LEA of Killiney–Shankill.

== See also ==
- List of towns and villages in Ireland
