= Park Theatre (London) =

Theatre in Finsbury Park, London, England

- Interactive map of Park Theatre
- Location: 11 Clifton Terrace; Finsbury Park; London, N4 3JP
- Coordinates: 51.5657°N 0.1085°W
- Public transit: Finsbury Park

Construction
- Opened: 2013; 13 years ago
- Architect: David Hughes

Website
- www.parktheatre.co.uk

The Park Theatre opened in Finsbury Park, north London in 2013. It describes itself as "a neighbourhood theatre with global ambition", offering a mixed programme of new writing, classics, and revivals. As well as the main auditorium seating 200, the building includes a 90-seat studio theatre, a rehearsal space and a café bar.

== Building ==
In November 2009, Artistic Director Jez Bond and Creative Director Melli Marie acquired a disused three-storey office building at 11-13 Clifton Terrace. Planning permission was granted in October 2010. The theatre was designed by David Hughes. Following a campaign supported by prominent theatre figures such as Sir Ian McKellen and Alan Rickman, the £2.6m cost was met by private donors and by the sale of flats built above the theatre.

The two auditoria, Park200 and Park90, have natural light which can be blacked out electronically. Park200 is a thrust stage with fixed seating on three sides, and can be configured for “theatre in the round”. Park90's flexible seating can be laid out in a range of configurations. The Morris Space on the third floor is used for workshops, classes, and performances for up to 60 people. Backstage are three dressing rooms, a green room, wardrobe, offices and prop stores. The café bar also hosts occasional cabaret and songwriting performances.

== Productions ==
Highlights of the opening season included the UK premiere of These Shining Lives by Melanie Marnich with a cast featuring Honeysuckle Weeks and Charity Wakefield and the world premiere of Oliver Cotton's Daytona, starring Maureen Lipman, which then toured the UK.

The theatre has had critical and box office successes with different types of productions. These include:

- New British plays by British authors including Sarah Rutherford's Adult Supervision (September 2013), Andrew Keatley's The Gathered Leaves (July 2015), and Jonathan Lynn's The Patriotic Traitor (February 2016). Journalist-turned-playwright Jonathan Maitland's Dead Sheep and An Audience with Jimmy Savile both drew sellout crowds in 2015. Staging plays such as Archie Maddocks' acclaimed A Place for We in October 2001 reflected the theatre's support for writing from minority groups.
- Revivals such Richard Bean's Toast (August 2014) and David Hare's The Vertical Hour (September 2014), both of which premiered at the Royal Court Theatre. A successful revival of Muswell Hill by Torben Betts played at the theatre in February 2015.
- UK premieres or revivals of acclaimed North American plays such as Almost, Maine (December 2015) and The Boys in the Band (October 2016), the latter subsequently transferring to the West End.
- Musicals such as The Buskers' Opera (April 2016) and The Burnt Part Boys (August 2016). In June 2022, Harry Hill and Steve Park's musical Tony! (The Tony Blair Rock Opera) satirized the UK's most successful prime minister.

Innovative productions include Grounded which incorporated British Sign Language (October 2015), and Brainstorm (2015), an exploration of the teenage brain in cooperation with Islington Community Theatre, the Wellcome Trust and the National Theatre. Avaes Mohammad's double bill about radicalization in the UK Hurling Rubble at the Sun/Hurling Rubble at the Moon was premiered in May 2015.

Park Theatre plays have moved on to the West End, most recently the Second World War drama Pressure, which following a sold-out April 2018 run in Park200 went on to the Ambassadors Theatre in June.

Park Theatre won The Stage magazine's Fringe Theatre of the Year Award for 2015.

== In-house productions and fundraising ==
Initially, as an unsubsidised registered charity, most Park Theatre plays were financed by external production companies, with the theatre as the host venue. However, Jez Bond's intention was always to stage more in-house productions, leading the theatre to devise innovative fundraising strategies.

In July 2017, long-time supporter Ian McKellen worked with the theatre to present a one-man show, Shakespeare, Tolkien, Others & You in Park200, donating the entire proceeds of the nine-performance run to the theatre. With this significant cash infusion, along with the support of the newly formed Producers’ Circle of high level donors, the theatre began producing or co-producing a greater proportion of shows in 2018. It began in May with Robert Schenkkan's post-Trump dystopia Building the Wall, directed by Bond. The second in-house production of 2018 was the world premiere of Danny Robins' The End of the Pier, directed by Hannah Price, beginning in July.

=== Whodunnit (Unrehearsed) ===
The theatre run Whodunnit [Unrehearsed] every two years to raise money to keep the theatre running. The stars, unlike the rest of the cast, do not see the script or attend rehearsals before their performance, and have to "solve the crime in real time, with only an earpiece feeding them lines, as they attempt to crack the case." The celebrities donate their time for one-off performances in the murder mystery. The audience do not know who the stars will be ahead of time. In 2019 the stars included Gillian Anderson, Damian Lewis, and Joanna Lumley, selling out at every performance. The success was repeated with new scripts in 2022. The sold-out 2024 show featured a mix of new (Martin Freeman, Adrian Lester, Katherine Ryan) and returning celebrities (Anderson, Benedict Cumberbatch, Emma Thompson), and was described by The Daily Telegraph as "“The glitziest star vehicle yet conceived for the off-West End, perhaps even for London theatre.” In 2026 Whodunnit [Unrehearsed] 4, featured over 60 star sheriffs such as Julian Clary, Alison Steadman, Hugh Bonneville, Jim Broadbent and Adrian Dunbar.

== Script Accelerator ==
Park Theatre's Script Accelerator programme began in 2013, inviting producers or theatre companies to pitch a play they would like to develop. Six are selected each year. Each producer selects actors and a director, and is given professional advice and working time within the building to develop the script. The four-weeks process culminates with a 20-minute critiqued presentation of each piece to an audience in Park200. Some scripts have gone on to full productions. Hot Coals Theatre Ensemble's Storm in a Teacup (February 2014) and Michael Ross's Happy to Help (June 2016) were both Script Accelerator selections which went on to play in Park90's regular season.

== Social responsibility ==
Like many of London's independent theatres, Park Theatre aims to be both a good neighbour locally and a progressive social influence. With donor support, it discounts a substantial number of tickets for local residents and schools each season, and runs acting classes for local children (Playground Players) and adults (Park Players). In 2016 it began a Reminiscence therapy programme for people affected by dementia and their carers.

The theatre has a policy of transparency and open-book accounting for both in-house and incoming productions, in an effort to ensure that actors are properly paid. It also runs amateur training programmes for local children and adults, and "relaxed performances" for people with disabilities.

In February 2019 the theatre initiated the Prism Project, offering free rehearsal and performance space to minority ethnic artists. Focused on providing support and professional opportunities to traditionally under-served groups within the theatre community, the project is open any artist from a BAME background. Its single eligibility criterion is that the writer (or a production team) have a script in progress that would benefit from access to rehearsal space.
