= Hugh Leonard =

Irish playwright and author (1926–2009)

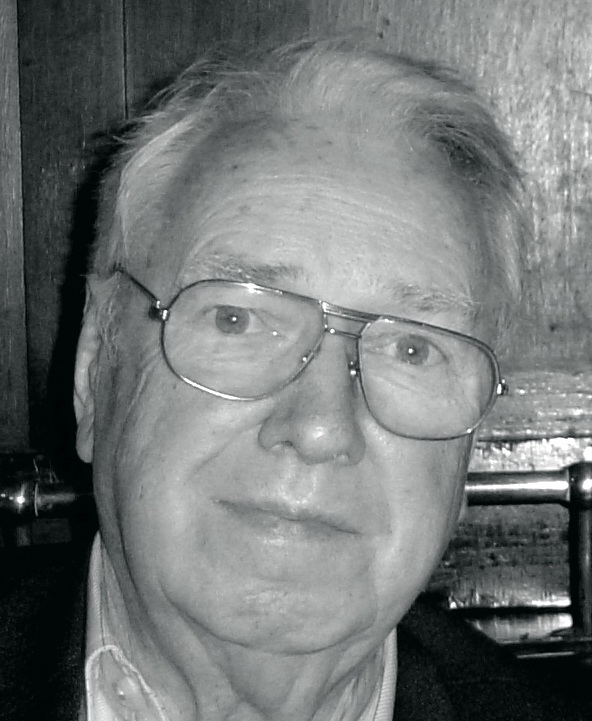
- Leonard c. 2004
- Born: John Joseph Byrne; 9 November 1926; Dublin, Ireland
- Died: 12 February 2009 (aged 82); Dalkey, Ireland
- Occupations: Playwright, novelist, essayist
- Spouse(s): Paule Byrne (d. 2000); Katharine Hayes
- Children: 1
- Writing career
- Notable works: The Au Pair Man; Da; A Life
- Website: hughleonardplaywright.com

Hugh Leonard (9 November 1926 – 12 February 2009) was an Irish playwright and author. In a career that spanned 50 years, he wrote nearly 30 full-length plays, 10 one-act plays, three volumes of essay, two autobiographies, three novels, numerous screenplays and teleplays, and a regular newspaper column.

== Life and career ==
Leonard was born in Dublin as John Joseph Byrne, but was put up for adoption. Raised in Dalkey, an affluent suburb of Dublin, by Nicholas and Margaret Keyes, he changed his name to John Keyes Byrne. For the rest of his life, despite the pen name of "Hugh Leonard", which he later adopted and by which became well known, he invited close friends to call him "Jack".

Leonard was educated at the Harold Boys National School, Dalkey, and Presentation College, Glasthule, winning a scholarship to the latter. He worked as a civil servant for 14 years. During that time, he both acted in and wrote plays for community theatre groups. His first play to be professionally produced was The Big Birthday, which was mounted by the Abbey Theatre in Dublin in 1956. His career with the Abbey Theatre continued until 1994. After that, his plays were produced regularly by Dublin's theatres.

He moved to Manchester for a while, working for Granada Television, before returning to Ireland in 1970, settling in Dalkey.

During the 1960s and 1970s, Leonard was the first major Irish writer to establish a reputation in television writing extensively for television, including original plays, comedies, thrillers, and adaptations of classic novels for British television. He was commissioned by RTÉ to write Insurrection, a 50th-anniversary dramatic reconstruction of the Irish uprising of Easter 1916. Leonard's Silent Song, adapted for the BBC from a short story by Frank O'Connor, won the Prix Italia in 1967. He wrote the script for the RTÉ adaptation of Strumpet City by James Plunkett.

Three of Leonard's plays have been presented on Broadway: The Au Pair Man (1973), which starred Charles Durning and Julie Harris; Da (1978); and A Life (1980). Of these, Da – which premiered at the Olney Theatre in 1973 before being produced off-off-Broadway at the Hudson Guild Theatre and then transferring to the Morosco Theatre – was the most successful, running for 20 months and 697 performances, then touring the United States for 10 months. It earned Leonard both a Tony Award and a Drama Desk Award for Best Play. It was made into a film in 1988, starring Martin Sheen and Barnard Hughes, who reprised his Tony Award-winning Broadway performance.

In 1984, Leonard discovered his accountant Russell Murphy had embezzled IR£258,000 from him. Leonard was particularly upset that Murphy had used his money to take clients to the theatre and purchased expensive seats at some of Leonard's plays.

Leonard wrote two volumes of autobiography, Home Before Night (1979) and Out After Dark (1989). Some of his essays and journalism were collected in Leonard's Last Book (1978) and A Peculiar People and Other Foibles (1979). In 1992 the Selected Plays of Hugh Leonard was published. Until 2006 he wrote a humorous weekly column, "The Curmudgeon", for the Irish Sunday Independent newspaper. He had a passion for cats and restaurants, and an abhorrence of broadcaster Gay Byrne.

In 1994, Leonard gave a review of Katie Roche' by Irish playwright Teresa Deevy which was performed in the Peacock Theatre, and he recalls his own acting role in an undated amateur production of 'Temporal Powers' which Teresa Deevy attended.

Even after retiring as a Sunday Independent columnist, Leonard displayed an acerbic humour. In an interview with Brendan O'Connor, he was asked if it galled him that Gay Byrne was now writing his old column. His reply was, "It would gall me more if he was any good at it." Leonard was a patron of the Dublin Theatre Festival.

In 1994, Leonard appeared in a televised interview with Gerry Adams, president of Sinn Féin, an Irish political party associated with the Provisional Irish Republican Army. Leonard had long been an opponent of paramilitary groups and a critic of the IRA. However, on the show and afterwards he was criticised for being "sanctimonious and theatrical" towards Adams; at one point he referred to Sinn Féin as "dogs".

Hugh Leonard- Odd Man In, a film on his life and work, shown on RTÉ in March 2009. Leonard's final play, Magicality, was not performed during his lifetime; a rehearsed reading of the second act was staged at the Dalkey Castle and Heritage Centre in June 2012.

Leonard died in his hometown, Dalkey, aged 82, after a long illness, leaving €1.5 million in his will.

== Awards and honours ==
- Writers' Guild of Great Britain – Award of Merit for Silent Song, 1966
- Prix Italia for original dramatic television programs – for Silent Song 1967
- Jacob's Television Award for adaptations of Wuthering Heights and Nicholas Nickleby, 1969
- Tony Award nomination for Best Play – The Au Pair Man, 1974
- Tony Award for Best Play – Da, 1978
- Drama Desk Award for Outstanding New Play – Da, 1977/78
- New York Drama Critics Circle Award for Best Play – Da, 1977/78
- Outer Critics Circle Award for the Most Outstanding Play of the New York Season – Da, 1977/78
- Harvey's Irish Theatre Award for A Life – best new play, 1979/80
- Tony Award nomination for Best Play - A Life, 1980/81
- Rhode Island College – honorary Doctor of Humane Letters, 1980
- University of Dublin – honorary Doctorate of Letters, 1988
- Society of Authors Sagittarius Prize – novel for Parnell and the Englishwoman, 1992
- The Abbey Theatre Award, 1999

== Works ==
Plays

- The Italian Road (1954)
- The Big Birthday (1956)
- A Leap in the Dark (1957)
- Madigan's Lock (1958)
- A Walk on the Water (1960)
- The Passion of Peter Ginty (1961)
- Stephen D (1962)
- Dublin One (1963)
- The Poker Session (1964)
- The Family Way (1964)
- The Saints Go Cycling In (1965)
- Mick and Mick (1966)
- The Quick and the Dead (two one-act plays) (1967)
  - "The Late Arrival of the Incoming Aircraft"
  - "The Dead"
- The Au Pair Man (1968)
- The Barracks (novel) (1969)
- The Patrick Pearse Motel (1971)
- Da (1973)
- Summer (play) (1974)
- Suburb of Babylon (three one-act plays) (1983)
  - "A Time of Wolves and Tigers"
  - "Nothing Personal"
  - "The Last of the Last of the Mohicans"
- Time Was (1976)
- Some of My Best Friends Are Husbands (1976)
- Liam Liar (1976)
- A Life (play) (1979)
- Kill (1982)
- The Mask of Moriarty (1985)
- Pizzazz: (three one-act plays) (1986)
  - "A View from the Obelisk"
  - "Roman Fever"
  - "Pizazz"
- Moving (play) (1992)
- Chamber Music (two one-act plays) (1994)
  - Senna for Sonny
  - The Lily Lally Show
- Great Expectations (1995)
- A Tale of Two Cities (1996)
- Love in the Title (1999)
- Magicality

Novels

- Parnell and the Englishwoman (1992)
- A Wild People (2001)
- Fillums (2004)

Essays

- Leonard's Last Book (1978)
- A Peculiar People and Other Foibles (1979)
- Leonard's Year (1985)
- Leonard's Log (1987)
- Leonard's Log – Again (1988)
- Rover and Other Cats (1992)
- Dear Paule (2000)

Autobiography

- Home Before Night (1979)
- Out After Dark (1989)

Film screenplays

- Interlude (1968)
- Great Catherine (1968)
- Percy (1971)
- Our Miss Fred (1972)
- Da (1988)
- Widows' Peak (1994)

Radio

- The Kennedys of Castleross: one of several script writers, c 1957.
- You and the Night and the Wireless (2001)
- Mogs (2006)

The Broadway production of Da (1978) starred Barnard Hughes (foreground) and Brian Murray

=== Reviews ===
- Those crazy cat days in their cradle (1994)

Television plays

- ITV Television Playhouse
  - "A Walk on the Water "(1961)
- Armchair Theatre
  - "The Irish Boys" (1962)
  - "A Kind of Kingdom" (1963)
  - Realm of Error (1964)
  - "I Loved You Last Summer" (1965)
  - "Great Big Blonde" (1966)
  - "Love Life" (1967)
  - "The Virgins" (1974)
- ITV Play of the Week
  - "A Leap in the Dark" (1960)
  - "Misalliance" (adaptation) (1962)
  - "The Rose Tattoo" (adaptation) (1964)
  - "Camino Real "(adaptation) (1964)
  - "Come Back, Little Sheba" (adaptation) (1965)
- First Night
  - "My One True Love" (1964)
  - "The Second Wall" (1964)
- Love Story
  - "The Last of the English Visitors" (1964)
  - "Toccato for Toy Trumpet" (1965)
  - "The Egg on the Face of the Tiger" (1968)
- Thirty-Minute Theatre
  - "The Late Arrival of the Incoming Aircraft" (1965)
  - "A Time of Wolves and Tigers" (1967)
- The Wednesday Play
  - "Silent Song" (1966)
  - "The Retreat" (1966)
- Insurrection (1966)
- Half Hour Story
  - "Do You Play Requests?" (1968)
  - "A View from the Obelisk" (1968)
- Comedy Playhouse
  - "Me Mammy" (1968)
- ITV Saturday Night Theatre
  - "The Dead" (adaptation) (1971)
  - "Pandora" (1971)
- Play of the Month
  - "Stephen D" (adaptation) (1972)

Episodic television

- Saki: 8 episodes (adaptations) (1962)
- The Verdict is Yours: 1 episode (1963)
- Maupassant: 10 episodes (adaptations) (1963)
- Jezebel ex UK: 1 episode (1963)
- The Liars: 13 episodes (1964)
- Triangle: 7 episodes (1964)
- The Hidden Truth: 1 episode (1964)
- Blackmail: 1 episode (1965)
- Undermind: 1 episode (1965)
- Thirteen Against Fate: 2 episodes (1966)
- Public Eye: 2 episodes (1966)
- The Informer: 2 episodes (1966)
- Out of the Unknown: 2 episodes (1966)
- Great Expectations: 10 episodes (adaptations) (1967)
- Wuthering Heights: 4 episodes (adaptations) (1967)
- Liebesgeschichten: 1 episode (1967)
- The Ronnie Barker Playhouse: 1 episode (1968)
- Nicholas Nickleby: 13 episodes (adaptations) (1968)
- Late Night Horror: 1 episode (1968)
- Sherlock Holmes: 3 episodes (1968)
- The Jazz Age: 1 episode (adaptation) (1968)
- Detective: 2 episodes (1968–1969)
- The Possessed: 6 episodes (adaptations) (1969)
- Dombey and Son: 13 episodes (adaptations) (1969)
- W. Somerset Maugham: 2 episodes (adaptations) (1969–1970)
- Me Mammy 3 series, 21 episodes (1969–1971)
- Sentimental Education: 3 episodes (adaptations) (1970)
- The Sinners: 4 episodes (adaptations) (1970-1971)
- Shadows of Fear: 1 episode (1971)
- Six Dates with Barker: 1 episode (1971)
- The Moonstone: 5 episodes (1972)
- Tales from the Lazy Acre: 7 episodes (1972)
- Country Matters: 4 episodes (adaptations) (1972–1973)
- Seven of One: 1 episode (1973)
- Black and Blue: 1 episode (1973)
- Father Brown: 6 episodes (adaptations) (1974)
- Nicholas Nickleby: 6 episodes (1977)
- London Belongs to Me: 7 episodes (1977)
- Diana Rigg's Three Piece Suite: one episode, Bitter Suite, (1977)
- Wuthering Heights: 2 episodes (1978)
- Strumpet City (miniseries) (adaptation) (1980)
- The Little World of Don Camillo: 12 episodes (1981)
- Good Behaviour (adaptation) (1983)
- The Irish R.M.: 2 episodes (1985)
- Storyboard: 1 episode (1989)
- Parnell & the Englishwoman (1991) TV mini-series
- Alleyn Mysteries: 1 episode (1993)

== See also ==
- List of Irish dramatists
