= Early Bird =

Early Bird (a hint to the adage "The early bird gets the worm") may refer to:

== Arts and entertainment ==
=== Film, television and theater ===
- The Early Bird (1925 film), an American silent comedy film
- The Early Bird (1936 film), a British comedy film directed by Donovan Pedelty
- The Early Bird, a 1965 British comedy film starring Norman Wisdom
- The Early Bird (play) a 2006 play by Leo Butler
- The Early Bird Show, a 1980s Australian children's TV show
- "The Early Birds", a 1976 episode of The Good Life
- Early Bird, a fictional character in The Angry Birds Movie

=== Literature ===
- The Early Bird, a 1968 children's book by Richard Scarry
- Early Bird: A Memoir of Premature Retirement, a 2005 book by Rodney Rothman

=== Music ===
- Early Bird Records, a jazz record label
- The Earlybirds, a New Zealand pop-rock band
- Earlybird", a song by the Eagles from Eagles, 1972
- "Early Bird", an instrumental by André Brasseur, 1965
- "Early Bird", a song by Erasure from Storm Chaser, 2007
- "Earlybird", a song by Van der Graaf Generator from ALT, 2012

== Aviation and satellites ==
- Early Bird Aircraft Company, an American aircraft manufacturer
- Early Bird 1, a 1997 earth observation satellite launched for EarthWatch, Inc.
- Intelsat I, a 1965 communications satellite nicknamed "Early Bird"

== Other uses ==
- Early Bird, Florida, US, an unincorporated community
- Early bird dinner, a dinner served earlier than traditional dinner hours, particularly at a restaurant
- Early Bird, a train of the PATrain commuter rail service
- Birdie the Early Bird, a McDonald's mascot
- Lark (person), or early bird, a person who gets up early in the morning

== See also ==
- The Early Bird Catches the Worm, a 2008 Italian film
- "Early Birdie", a song by Owl City from Maybe I'm Dreaming
- Early Birds of Aviation, an organization devoted to the history of early pilots
