= Faces in the Crowd =

Faces in the Crowd may refer to:

- Faces in the Crowd (Sports Illustrated), a segment in the magazine Sports Illustrated
- Faces in the Crowd (play), a 2008 play by Leo Butler
- Faces in the Crowd (2011 film), a crime drama horror thriller film
- Faces in the Crowd (2023 film), a Chinese drama film
- Faces in the Crowd (novel), a 2011 Mexican novel

== See also ==
- A Face in the Crowd (disambiguation)
