= Gregory Motton =

British playwright and author (born 1961)

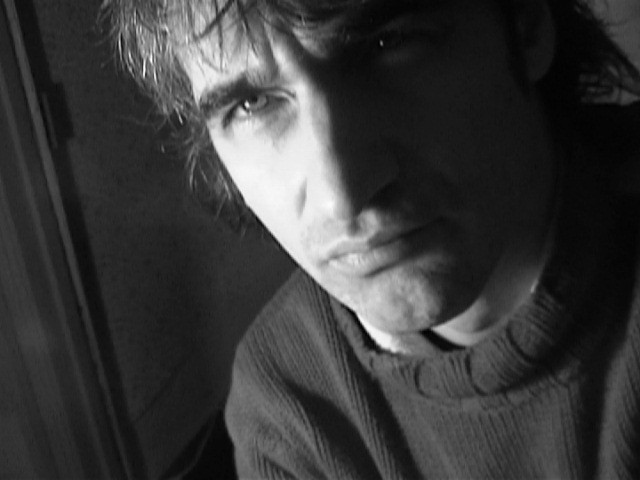
- Born: September 1961 (age 65); London, England
- Occupations: Playwright, songwriter, author, film director
- Website: https://www.gregory-motton.com/

Gregory Motton (born September 1961) is a British playwright and author. Motton is best known for the originality of his formally demanding, largely a-political theatre plays at the Royal Court in the 1980s and 1990s, state of the nation satires in the 1990s, and later for his polemics about working class politics, A Working Class Alternative To Labour and Helping Themselves – The Left Wing Middle Classes In Theatre And The Arts.

He speaks fluent Swedish and is one of the chief translators of Strindberg's plays, known for his strict advocacy of translations rather than versions. His work is translated into several languages including Japanese, Portuguese, French, Hungarian, Swedish, Danish, Finnish, and Norwegian (translated by Nobel Prize winner Jon Fosse, published Samlaget)

He returned to political writing in 2013 with A Worthless Man, and then in 2024 and 2025 with Listen to Me Now, First They Came For, Liberate Yourself and Help is on its Way.

He has also written a series of short plays about the nature of Jesus of Nazareth; Simeon-the first Christian, Lazarus, Judas of the Field and St John at the Cross.

== Early life ==
Gregory Motton was born in September 1961 in Wood Green, in the London borough of Enfield, the second child of Bernadette (née Clancy) from Rosscarbery in West Cork, Ireland, a bar-maid, and David Motton, of Tottenham, London, a writer of children's comics. He attended St. Angela's Convent, St. Paul's School, and Winchmore Comprehensive.

== Early career ==
Motton's first two plays were staged in quick succession: Chicken (directed by Kate Harwood) at the Riverside Studios in April 1987, and then Ambulance (directed by Lindsay Posner) at the Royal Court in September 1987. His unconventional writing style soon dispersed the initial keen interest it had first awakened in managements and critics. His third play, Downfall, again directed by Lindsay Posner at the Royal Court in July 1988, contained 56 very brief scenes, 26 characters and a fragmented illogical structure. It brought fierce condemnation from the critics, an empty theatre, and an end of the Royal Court's interest in Motton for several years.

His fourth play, Looking at You (revived) Again commissioned originally by the National Theatre Studio, continued with the lyrical aspects of the previous plays but with a more economical technique . It followed a simple story but had a more or less non-naturalistic lyrical form. Rejected by Peter Gill, the then artistic director of the National Theatre Studio, it did not receive a rehearsed reading. It was produced by Simon Usher at the Leicester Haymarket in June 1989, during the period of David Gothard's co-artistic directorship. The play was transferred to the Bush Theatre by Jenny Killick, was unanimously disliked by the critics, and the theatre was empty once again.

Consequently, it was not until a further three years later that two of Motton's plays were produced, almost simultaneously: A Message for the Broken Hearted, directed by Ramin Gray, March 1993, at the Liverpool Everyman; and The Terrible Voice of Satan, directed by James MacDonald, July 1993, at the Royal Court, now being run by Stephen Daldry. (Motton and Gray formed the Ducks and Geese Theatre Company to bring the former play to London, at the Battersea Arts Centre. They subsequently worked together directing a number of Motton's plays in France.)

Both plays met with almost universal disapproval by the critics, and Motton's brief career in Britain was effectively over. Excepting A Little Election Satire for one week at the Gate Theatre in 1997 under David Farr, it was to be another twelve years before one of his plays was produced there. His plays remained out of print in English until 1997 when James Hogan of Oberon Books began the re-publication of all his plays in several volumes.

== France ==
During that period his plays were premiered in Paris. Notable productions were by the director Claude Régy(Downfall 1992 and Terrible Voice of Satan Oct 1994), and also by the director Éric Vigner (Looking at You (revived) Again - "Reviens à toi (encore)" 1994) at the Theatre de l'Odeon*, playing to packed houses of 800, while the play was rejected by the NT Studio for a reading even though they had commissioned the play.Peter Gill of the National Theatre Studio, subsequently apologised for this in a public meeting at the Riverside Studios (Also premiered in that theatre was Loue Sois le Progress 1998).

During this period Motton wrote the "Gengis" series of satirical political plays (Cat and Mouse (Sheep), premiered at the Theatre de L'Odeon, Gengis Amongst the Pygmies, premiered at the Comedie Francaise, A Holiday in the Sun, premiered on Radio France Culture, and The Rape Of Europe). The first of these, Cat And Mouse (Sheep), was directed by Ramin Gray and Gregory Motton in English, and this production was seen briefly in Britain at the Gate Theatre under David Farr, a few months later. All four plays of that series have been the subject of public readings at the Royal Court, but never produced there.

British critic Michael Billington noted Motton's presence abroad, which he interpreted in the following manner: "Ignored in his native Britain, Gregory Motton is widely performed in France and, watching the premiere (at the Comedie Francaise) of his latest piece, it is not difficult to see why. Motton studiously rejects naturalism and instead offers a comic-strip satire on capitalist consumerism in the style of Jarry, Ionesco or Vian. He is like an absurdist with Marxist tendencies".(Guardian 2004)

== Recent work ==
Motton's relationship with the Royal Court began again in 2005, during Ian Rickson's tenure. Rickson was not a natural enthusiast for Motton's work and was reluctant to produce any of his characteristically unconventional plays to which there had always been significant opposition. He decided against producing A Holiday in the Sun. which he had commissioned and which was the subject of a reading. He was finally persuaded to produce The World's Biggest Diamond in 2005 which is a largely conventional drama about a lifelong love affair. This starred Jane Asher and Michael Feast and, perhaps surprisingly, earned the Royal Court the only 5 star review it had so far received during Rickson's term there.

Ironically perhaps, Alex Sierz took this as a sign of a change in Motton's writing "The World's Biggest Diamond by Gregory Motton (Royal Court) Is Motton our English Strindberg? This account of two lovers who meet for a weekend after 30 years seethes with Scandinavian gloom. But whatever happened to Motton's distinctively weird personal vision?" (Alex Sierz)

Motton's plays have been produced only once in the past 17 years in Britain and never, in Britain, in a theatre with more than 90 seats. It is perhaps for this reason that he is considered by some commentators to have been rejected, along with some other writers, by the theatre establishment; Playwright Mark Ravenhill, wrote: "The English theatre has for some 50 years told itself that it is a writers' theatre. It's odd, then, that the English theatre should have produced a substantial list of playwrights who have become alienated from our theatres, often at the peak of their power.In my imagination there's a strange hinterland, an empty multi-storey car park standing at a point equidistant from both the Royal Court and the National Theatres, where the shades of once-celebrated playwrights such as Arnold Wesker, John Arden, Howard Barker and Gregory Motton wander up and down". To others Motton is a natural dissident because of the form and the content of his writing. Dominic Dromgoole ("not a fan of Motton's work") calls him the Tony Benn or Dennis Skinner of playwriting.

Most recently, Gregory Motton has begun writing musicals. He wrote the music, lyrics and books of three in less than three years, having composed more than 60 songs. They are; Nefertiti and Akhenaten, The Mystery Of Hill Street and Dracula. He wrote a fourth Tristan and Yseult in 2014. In 2014 he released a double CD album, called Damnation and Praise (Exile Music), containing a selection of 27 songs from 4 of his musicals.

In 2020 The Ice-Floe Girl was published as a memoir (Conrad Press 2021) "an account of an ephemeral beauty...an angelic Swedish au-pair."

In 2013 Ramin Gray commissioned him to write a play for ATC Theatre. The play he delivered was A Worthless Man. It was not produced because Ramin Gray considered the material to be too contentious; he commented; "I can't put that on, I'd get the sack."

Between 2018-2023 he made a series of five full-length films, and in 2024 he wrote a large number of monologues. In 2024 there was a series of rehearsed readings of eight of his new plays, directed by Simon Usher, in Soho, London, at the Soho Folk and Blues, 41 Frith Street, London. Others were read at the Deal Angling Club, Kent, and the Torriano Meeting House, in Kentish town, London.

== Awards ==
In 2012, Strindberg's centenary year in Sweden, Motton was awarded the Swedish Writers Guild (Dramatikerförbundet) Göran O Eriksson Award for his translations of Strindberg. This award was presented on the stage of Strindbergs Intima Teater, in Stockholm. The jury's motivation for the award was "Gregory Motton is a very many-sided translator whose work is valued by a great number of authors. His translations of dramatic works of widely differing genres and styles, display a faithfulness which points to the kind of sensitivity, integrity and precision, that comes of great professional skill."

== Theatre and politics ==
In various articles and interviews, Motton has voiced some criticisms of British theatre, ("The Stage of Hollow Moralising") Guardian 16 April 1992, reprinted Theatre Forum Fall 1992, The Stage 1 April 1993, Whats On 5 May 1993, and most notably in the mid-1990s when he wrote an article about the high administrative staffing levels and low plays output of Britains regional theatres. Patrick Marmion wrote; "He stands aside from the mainstream orthodoxy of issue based writing....Now theatres are looking at his plays but remain edgy about what he may say in them." Motton's comments about British theatre may have alienated theatres against him.

More recently, he wrote a book, Helping Themselves - the Left Wing Middle Classes in Theatre and the Arts , criticising the influence of the middle class left in both the arts and politics, and their effect on working class representation in politics. It includes an examination of the working class identity of the Royal Court in the 1960s and 70s, with specific reference to the public school origins of many of their best known writers.

This book was commissioned by Oberon Books, but was rejected by them for publication. It is published by Levellers Press. It was accepted for sale in the Royal Court bookshop by the Royal Court Artistic Director Dominic Cooke, despite its robust criticisms of that theatre. No more of Motton's plays were published by Oberon Books subsequent to that date.

In December 2013, Motton published A Working Class Alternative to Labour a book outlining a collection of policies designed to remove poverty, by the means of a high statutory minimum wage and a return to manufacturing. The central idea of the book is to shift money and economic activity from the top end of the economy to the lower end, and proposes a challenge to the predominance of large capital and its influence in our society, most notably by ending Britain's reliance on profits from investment in foreign industries (through investment banking) for the balance of payments. He proposes a return to what is called 'traditional banking' where money from current accounts is invested in domestic industries. He advocates free and untested access to grammar schools for all who want it, as a means of countering the predominance of a public school educated elite in positions of power.

There is a section describing the workings of the European Union, and a critique of its lack of democratic accountability. He points out that the government of the EU (the executive) is not elected, and that the European Union elections, are only of MEPs, and are therefore largely cosmetic since the executive is not drawn from the MEPs and cannot be removed by elections.

Motton portrays the EU as a largely capitalist organisation designed to drive down working class wages. He characterises the EU's appropriation of political power, by-passing democracy, as a coup d'état by the administrative classes of Europe. He gives evidence of a belief amongst EU leaders that political and economic decisions are best made without reference to democracy. This book is now in the House of Commons Library.

== Film ==
For Two Cities Films, he has written and directed four full-length feature films, which make up a quartet of films called The Four Gospels of Dracula the Messiah. Filming began in 2017 and ended in 2021. They are:

- 1 The Four Gospels of Dracula the Messiah, part one: A Voice Crying In The Wilderness. 1hr 16mins.
- 2 The Four Gospels of Dracula the Messiah, part two: Conquering Death. 1hr 16 mins.
- 3 The Four Gospels of Dracula the Messiah, part three: The Seducer. 1 hr 24 mins.
- Part four was released in January 2022.

Also

- Lilith 2022, 120 mins, also for Two Cities Films. Notting Hill Film Festival 2023

== Selected works ==
=== Plays include ===
- Chicken (Penguin, Oberon) Riverside Studios 1987,
- Ambulance (Penguin,/Oberon) Royal Court 1987,
- Downfall (Methuen, Oberon) Royal Court 1988,
- Looking at You (Revived) Again, (Flood Books, Oberon) Leicester Haymarket 1989,
- A Message for the Broken Hearted 1993 (Flood Books, Oberon) Liverpool Playhouse,
- The Terrible Voice of Satan (Flood Books, Oberon) Royal Court 1993,
- Cat and Mouse (Sheep) (Flood Books, Oberon) Theatre de L'Odeon 1995,
- The Forest of Mirrors (Methuen) National Theatre Studio,
- In Praise of Progress (Oberon) Theatre de L'Odeon 1999,
- A Little Satire (Oberon) Gate Theatre 1997,
- God's Island (Oberon) Theatre de La Tempête 2001,
- You Need Some of This, Théâtre de Gennevilliers,
- Gengis Amongst the Pygmies (Oberon) Comedie Francaise 2004,
- A Holiday In The Sun (Oberon) Radio France Culture 2005,
- Same as the Old Boss - How the Labour Party Betrayed the Working Classes, 2005, commissioned by The National Theatre (Levellers Press)
- The World's Biggest Diamond (Oberon) Royal Court 2005,
- The Rape Of Europe (Levellers Press 2011) Commissioned 2008, Calder Bookshop Theatre Jan 2013
- Petrol (Levellers Press 2013) Gulbenkian Theatre March 2013
- A Worthless Man (Levellers Press 2017)
- Palm Sunday12 April 2024
- All Abord, April 2024,
- Listen to Me Now,12 April 2024, Soho Folk and Blues, 26 July 2024 (Levellers Press)
- Burning House, 10 May 2024 Soho Folk and Blues, 26 July 2024
- The Balcony, 17 April 2024, Soho Folk and Blues, 19 July 2024
- Omphalos, 17 May 2024 Soho Folk and Blues, 26 July 2024
- Car Door Handle, 17 May 2024 Soho Folk and Blues, 26 July 2024
- Simeon, 24 May 2024, Soho Folk and Blues, 19 July 2024,& 15 April, Deal Angling club, 14 December 2024
- People Get Ready, 3 July 2024 Soho Folk and Blues 19 July 2024.
- Wake up, 16 June 2024
- Judas of the Field, 15 August 2024, Soho Folk and Blues 15 April 2025
- No Fuss, 9 September 2024,
- Two Women, 19 September 2024,
- I wish I wish I wish in Vain, 2024,
- First They Came For, 5 November 2024,(Levellers Press), Torriano Meeting House, October 2025.
- This Isn't My vibe, This Isn't What I Meant, 13th Novernber 2024, Soho Folk and Blues, 15 April 2025
- #17, 13th november 2024,
- When a Tyrant is Dead, December 2024,
- Help is on its Way, 5 December 2024 (Levellers Press) Torriano Meeting House October 2025.
- Lazarus, 8 February 2025, Soho Folk and Blues 15 April 2025
- Liberate yourself, 31 July 2025 (Levellers Press)Torriano Meeting House, October 2025
- The Finger on the Pulse, 28 August 2025
- Found Guilty, October 2025
- The Extra Mile 27 November 2025
- Welcome Mr Norris, November 2025
- Yellow Warning, December 2025
- No Room At The Inn, 20 December 2025
- The Story of Mary and Joseph, 2025

=== Short plays ===
- The Jug 1990 BBC Radio,
- Lazy Bríen 1991 BBC Radio,
- A Monologue (Oberon) Musee Dauphioise 1998,
- The Mother,
- Pirates.

=== Musicals ===
- The Mystery Of Hill Street (Script, words and music of 20 songs)2010
- Nefertiti and Akhenaten (Script, words and music of 16 songs)2011
- Dracula (Script, words and music of 27 songs, plus 5 instrumental pieces)2012

=== Books ===
- Helping Themselves - The Left Wing Middle Classes in Theatre and the Arts (Levellers Press 2009)
- A Working Class Alternative To Labour (Levellers Press 2013)
- The Ice-Floe Girl (Conrad Press 2020)

=== Translations from Swedish ===
- The Ghost Sonata by August Strindberg (Oberon)
- The Pelican by August Strindberg (Oberon),
- Swanwhite by August Strindberg (Oberon),
- The Burned Site by August Strindberg (Oberon),
- The Storm by August Strindberg (Oberon),
- The Father by August Strindberg (Oberon),
- Miss Julie by August Strindberg. (Oberon),
- Comrades by August Strindberg (Oberon),
- Creditors by August Strindberg (Oberon),
- The Great Highway by August Strindberg (Oberon),
- The Black Glove by August Strindberg (Oberon),
- The Dance of Death by August Strindberg (Oberon),
- Easter by August Strindberg (Oberon)

=== Translations from Norwegian ===
- The Name by Jon Fosse (Oberon),
- Someone Is Going to Come by Jon Fosse (Oberon)

=== Translations from German ===
- Woyzeck by Georg Büchner (Nick Hern Books)
