= Alison! A Rock Opera =

- The album cover for Alison! A Rock Opera
- Music: Leo Butler and Dan Persad
- Lyrics: Leo Butler and Dan Persad
- Productions: 2011 Royal Court Theatre Rough Cuts Season; 2012 The King's Head Theatre, London; 2014 The Spread Eagle Theatre, Croydon

Alison! A Rock Opera is a musical with music and lyrics by playwright Leo Butler and Dan Persad. The modern rock 'n' roll song-cycle tells the story of ordinary woman Alison who breaks up with her boyfriend Jimmy and goes on a journey of self-discovery.

"Yes, breaking up is hard to do. It’s loud, it’s thrashy and the lyrics and storytelling are first class" – Aleks Sierz.

The show premiered at the Royal Court Theatre in September 2011 as part of the theatre's Rough Cuts season, with its original title (and opening song) A Separate Reality. It was directed by Nick Bagnall, and featured Anna Francolini and Rhashan Stone in the cast. In September 2012, the full-length show, retitled Alison! A Rock Opera, was produced at the King's Head Theatre in Islington, London. It was directed by Bagnall, and the cast featured Clare Cathcart in the title role. In April 2014, the show was revived at The Spread Eagle Theatre in Croydon, Greater London, and the cast featured Lucy Edge and Rhydian Persad.

In 2013, the show was recorded and released as a CD and a digital download.
