= I'll Be The Devil =

2008 British play by Leo Butler

- poster for I'll Be The Devil
- Written by: Leo Butler
- Original language: English
- Setting: Ireland

Premiere
- Date premiered: 2008
- Place premiered: Tricycle Theatre, London

I'll Be The Devil is a play by Leo Butler commissioned by the Royal Shakespeare Company and written in response to The Tempest by William Shakespeare. It was staged for the first time at the Tricycle Theatre in 2008, directed by Ramin Gray. It featured Derbhle Crotty, Tom Burke, John McInerny and Gerard Murphy.

== Synopsis ==
The play is set in Ireland during the 18th century. An English soldier has two illegitimate children by his mistress, a local woman. His pending departure for England triggers dramatic events. Young cattle-killer Dermot is a Celtic Caliban. He becomes the instrument of his mother Maryanne's revenge against his father, Lieutenant Coyle.

Butler said of the play, "More than anything I want to put the audience in the eye of the storm. There are a lot of plays about war and colonialism that are wry and ironic and theoretical and that’s all very well, but it’s always taking a step backward from the reality."

== Reception ==
Dominic Cavendish of The Telegraph said, "this lush, savage, nightmarish imagining of colonial Ireland circa 1762 suggests an imagination that has suddenly, gloriously and recklessly taken wing", claiming that he was "thrilled at the provocation of it, transfixed by its darkness" and that "as a vision of a world without hope, it is too terrifying to dismiss."

Andrew Billen of the New Statesman commented that "it was like being held hostage by a violent lunatic."

Michael Billington of The Guardian felt that "Butler makes clear the irony of conscripted converts to Protestantism helping to oppress the local Catholics".

Rebecca Omonira, writing for IndieLondon, commented that the "enigmatic play had me – and the rest of the audience – enthralled from start to finish", praising it as "a graphic depiction of the worst of humanity" which "relentlessly shows how ordinary people become complicit conspirators in torture and rape.".

Julie Carpenter writing for the Daily Express described it as "a violent, unforgiving and immensely powerful play that is not for the faint-hearted".

=== Other reviews ===
- "Theatre review: I'll Be the Devil at Tricycle Theatre". British Theatre Guide.
- TB (28 February 2008). "I'll Be The Devil | Official London Theatre - Your London Shows guide". London, UK: Society of London Theatre. Archived from the original on 4 March 2016.
- "Extraextra review".
