= Harriet Bibby =

English actress (born 1998)

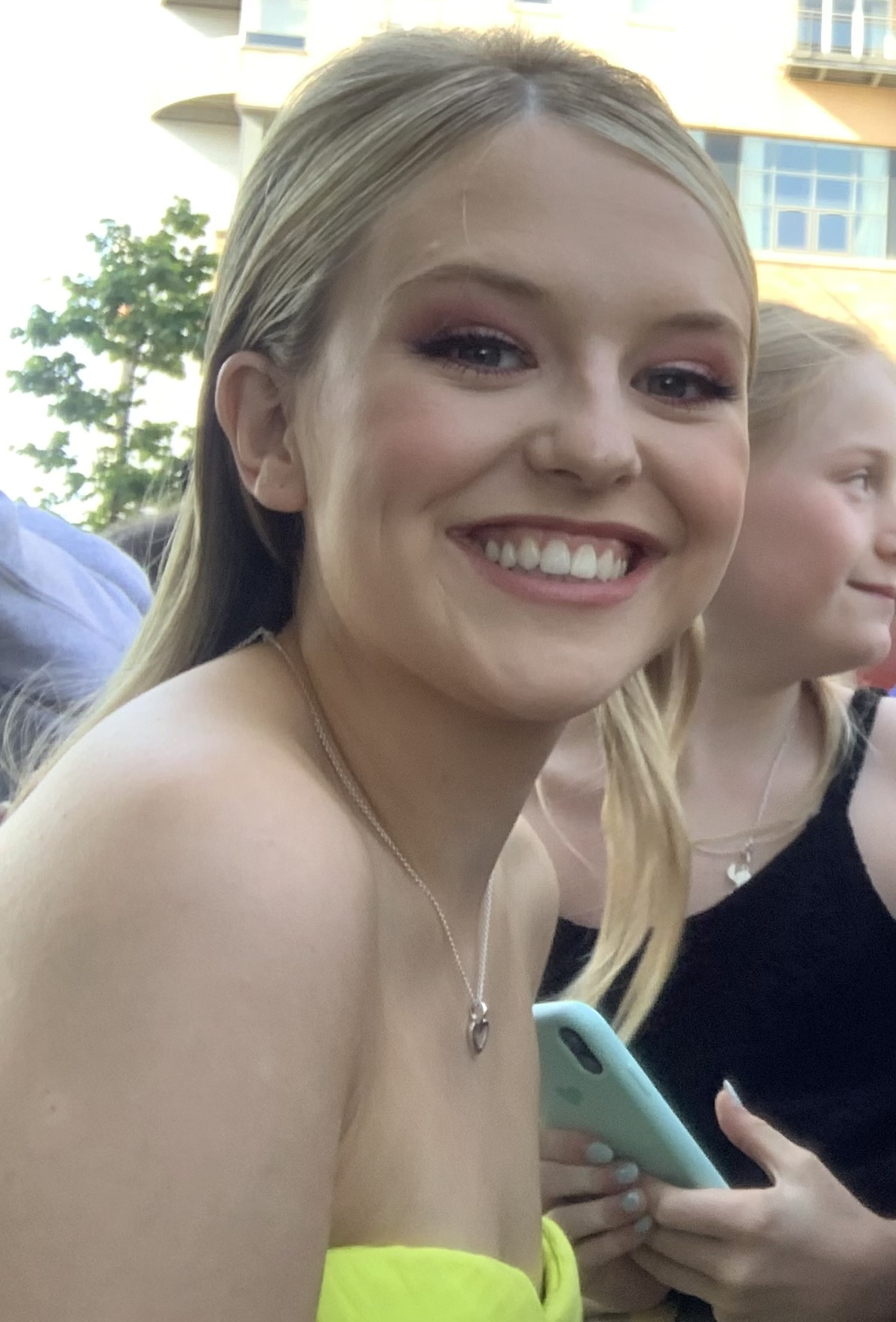
- Bibby in 2023
- Born: Harriet Anne Bibby; 27 April 1998 (age 28); Market Rasen, Lincolnshire, England
- Education: De Aston School; ALRA
- Occupation: Actress
- Years active: 2018–present
- Television: Coronation Street

Harriet Anne Bibby (born 27 April 1998) is an English actress, known for her role as Summer Spellman in the ITV1 soap opera Coronation Street. Prior to her casting on the soap, Bibby appeared in episodes of Doctors and Brassic.

== Life and career ==
Harriet Anne Bibby was born on 27 April 1998 in Market Rasen, Lincolnshire. She attended the De Aston School, where she featured in school theatre productions and eventually got into the National Youth Theatre summer school programme. After leaving De Aston, she attended the Academy of Live and Recorded Arts (ALRA), where she obtained a BA in acting. Whilst studying at ALRA, she appeared in various stage productions, including Oppenheimer and Game. Bibby made her television debut in a 2020 episode of the BBC soap opera Doctors, where she portrayed Clara Bindon. She then appeared in an episode of the Sky series Brassic.

In 2020, Bibby was cast in the ITV1 soap opera Coronation Street as Summer Spellman. The role was previously played by Matilda Freeman, who had decided to leave the role earlier that year. Bibby was 22 when she was cast as the 16-year-old character, accrediting her casting to her "baby face". After being cast as Summer, Bibby moved to Manchester with her sister. A year into her tenure, Bibby was nominated for Best Newcomer at the 2021 Inside Soap Awards. Then in 2022, she was nominated for a National Television Award. In July 2022, Bibby took a break from the soap to appear in the theatre production Blackbird. She was meant to appear in the play prior to joining Coronation Street but it was postponed due to the impact of the COVID-19 pandemic on theatre. Also alongside her role on Coronation Street, Bibby works as a musical theatre teacher for children on Saturdays, due to enjoying them as a child.

== Filmography ==
Year	Title	Role	Notes	Ref.
2020	Doctors	Clara Bindon	Episode: "Cul-de-Sac"	
2020–present	Coronation Street	Summer Spellman	Regular role	
2021	Brassic	Kaden's Mum	1 episode	
2022	The Masked Dancer	Summer Spellman	1 episode	

== Stage ==
Year	Title	Role	Venue	Ref.
2018	The Threepenny Opera	Beggar	Octagon Theatre	
2018	Game	Liam	ALRA	
2018	Oppenheimer	Jean Tatlock	ALRA	
2019	Cannibals	Lizaveta	ALRA	
2022	Blackbird	Girl	Royal Court Theatre	
2026	My Name is Rachel Corrie	Rachel Corrie	53Two, Manchester	

== Awards and nominations ==
Year	Award	Category	Nominated work	Result	Ref.
2021	Inside Soap Awards	Best Newcomer	Coronation Street	Nominated	
2022	National Television Awards	Serial Drama Performance	Coronation Street	Nominated	
