= Lucky Dog =

(The) Lucky Dog or lucky dog may refer to:

== Film and TV ==
- The Lucky Dog (1921), the first film to include both Stan Laurel and Oliver Hardy
- Lucky Dog (film), 1933 film about a man searching for his dog
- Lucky Dog, a TV program, part of CBS Dream Team

== Other uses ==
- Lucky dog (auto racing), a rule in motorsport also known as the beneficiary rule
- Lucky Dog (band), an Australian reggae band of the late 1970s-1980
- Lucky Dog (play), a 2004 play by Leo Butler about marital solitude

== See also ==
- Lucky (dog), received the Dickin Medal for bravery in the Malayan Emergency
- Lucky, a dog owned by U.S. President Ronald Reagan
- Lucky, a dog in the Disney film One Hundred and One Dalmatians and subsequent adaptations
