= Dominic Cooke =

English director and writer (born 1966)

Dominic Cooke CBE
- Born: 1966 (age 59–60); Wimbledon, London, England
- Occupations: Director; writer
- Partner: Alexi Kaye Campbell

Dominic Cooke CBE (born 1966) is an English director and writer.

== Early life ==
Born in Wimbledon, south London, Cooke saw a lot of theatre as a teenager thanks to free theatre tickets provided by the Inner London Education Authority.

== Career ==
Soon after graduating from Warwick University, Cooke's first job as a TV runner led him to start his own theatre company, Pan Optic, which he ran for two years before becoming an assistant director at the Royal Shakespeare Company (RSC).

He started his relationship with the Royal Court Theatre under Stephen Daldry in 1995. He became an associate director at the Royal Court for Ian Rickson in 1999. During this time, he directed Fireface by Marius von Mayenburg, Other People by Christopher Shinn, and Redundant by Leo Butler. In 2003, he left the Royal Court and returned to the RSC for Michael Boyd, where he directed his acclaimed version of The Crucible starring Iain Glen, which won him the 2007 Laurence Olivier Award for Best Director; the play also won the Olivier for Best Revival.

He has won five Olivier Awards. In addition to Best Director and Best Revival for The Crucible in 2007, he won Best Revival for Ma Rainey’s Black Bottom in 2016, Best Musical Revival for Follies in 2018, and, in 2013, his final season in the Jerwood Theatre Upstairs at the Royal Court won Achievement In An Affiliate Theatre.

In 2013, he won the International Theatre Institute Award for Excellence in International Theatre, and in the same year, was awarded an Honorary Doctorate of Letters by his alma mater, Warwick University. Cooke was appointed Commander of the Order of the British Empire (CBE) in the 2014 New Year Honours for services to drama.

=== Royal Court ===
Cooke was artistic director and Chief Executive of the Royal Court Theatre 2006 to 2013 during which time he pioneered new writing by actively promoting the Royal Court's Young Writers’ Programme and new, young writers such as Mike Bartlett (My Child), Polly Stenham (That Face), Penelope Skinner (The Village Bike) and Bola Agbaje (the Olivier Award-winning Gone Too Far!).

During his tenure at the Royal Court Cooke staged Jez Butterworth’s multi-award winning Jerusalem which Ian Rickson directed; and which transferred to the West End, Broadway, and San Francisco; Lucy Prebble’s 2009 Enron, which was directed by Rupert Goold; and Bruce Norris’ Clybourne Park, which Cooke directed himself. All three were transferred to the West End amid critical acclaim and box office success.

Cooke's time at the Royal Court was a huge success; he staged numerous new plays and refocused the theatre's aims. Of the 130+ plays, 94 were full productions of new plays, with public readings and productions of old plays making up the remainder. The theatre was nominated for 210 major awards and won 59. Cooke was also credited with bringing a new dynamism and excitement to the Royal Court Theatre with his eclectic programming: "What makes Cooke’s reign unique is that he has used the Royal Court’s young writers programme as a way of finding and cultivating new talent, often by precariously young writers...for Cooke, if a play was good enough, that was enough: he would put it on…Polly Stenham’s ‘That Face’, staged when she was only 19, bowled over its audiences. Anya Reiss was younger still – 18 – when her assured debut ‘Spur of the Moment’ opened. Bola Agbaje won an Olivier with her first play ‘Gone Too Far!’"

=== Writing ===
In 2007, Cooke wrote the stage adaptation of Malorie Blackman's Noughts and Crosses, which he directed and produced at the RSC. He wrote an adaptation of Arabian Nights for the Young Vic in 1998 and directed a revised version for the RSC in 2009. With scriptwriter Ben Power, Cooke co-wrote the scripts for Shakespeare's Henry VI Parts 1 and 2 for BBC TV's The Hollow Crown: The Wars of the Roses (May 2016).

=== National Theatre ===
Cooke is a National Theatre Associate Director; he made his directing debut there in November 2011 with Shakespeare's The Comedy of Errors, which he set in modern-day London. The cast included Lenny Henry and Claudie Blakley, and was broadcast worldwide in March 2012 as part of the NT Live programme. Cooke directed Caryl Churchill's Here We Go at the National in 2015. He directed the critically acclaimed production of August Wilson's Ma Rainey’s Black Bottom in 2016, which won the 2015 Olivier Award for Best Revival. His 2017 production of Stephen Sondheim and James Goldman's Follies starring Imelda Staunton, Janie Dee, and Tracie Bennett was nominated for ten Olivier Awards, winning Best Musical Revival. Cooke received the Critics' Circle Best Director Award.

In 2026 Cooke directed a revival of Cloud 9 by Caryl Churchill at the Lyttelton Theatre of the National Theatre. The cast includes Sam Troughton, Stuart Thompson, Ellen Robertson, Charlotte Ritchie, Rebecca Humphries, Tom Mothersdale and Eloka Ivo, and the set design is by Miriam Buether.

=== Television ===
Cooke's TV directorial debut was in May 2016 with the second BBC TV series of The Hollow Crown: The Wars of the Roses. The series was televised in three parts: Henry VI, Part 1, Henry VI, Part 2, and Richard III. It was produced by Sam Mendes' company, Neal Street Productions, and starred Benedict Cumberbatch, Judi Dench, Sophie Okonedo, Tom Sturridge, and Hugh Bonneville.

=== Film ===
Cooke's feature directorial debut, On Chesil Beach, starring Saoirse Ronan and Billy Howle, premiered at the Toronto International Film Festival on 7 September 2017. It is based on the novel of the same name by Booker Prize winning novelist Ian McEwan. The film received a wide release in 2018 and was chosen by Variety as one of the ten best films at the Toronto International Film Festival 2017. His latest film, The Courier, starring Benedict Cumberbatch, Merab Ninidze, Rachel Brosnahan, and Jessie Buckley, premiered at Sundance in January 2020. It was released in the US by Lionsgate and Roadside Attractions. He is slated to direct a movie of Stephen Sondheim and James Goldman's musical Follies.

== Private life ==
Cooke's civil partner is the actor and playwright Alexi Kaye Campbell. They have been together since 1997.

Cooke is Jewish.

== Work ==
=== Theatre ===
Year	Play	Production	Notes
2026	George R. R. Martin's Game of Thrones: The Mad King by Duncan Macmillan	Royal Shakespeare Company	
2025	Mrs. Warren's Profession by Bernard Shaw	Garrick Theatre	
2024	Hello, Dolly! by Jerry Herman and Michael Stewart	London Palladium	Nominated for 3 Laurence Olivier Awards including Best Musical Revival
2023	Rock Follies (Musical) with a book by Chloë Moss and songs by Howard Schuman and Andy Mackay	Minerva Theatre, Chichester Festival Theatre	
2017	Follies by Stephen Sondheim and James Goldman	Royal National Theatre	starring Imelda Staunton, Tracie Bennett, Philip Quast, Janie Dee, Dame Josephine Barstow, Nominated Evening Standard Award Best Director, Winner Critic's Circle Theatre Award Best Director, Nominated for 10 Laurence Olivier Awards, including Best Director & winning Best Musical Revival
2016	Pigs And Dogs by Caryl Churchill	Royal Court Theatre	
2016	Ma Rainey's Black Bottom by August Wilson	Royal National Theatre	Winner Best Revival Laurence Olivier Awards, Nominated Best Director Evening Standard Awards
2015	Here We Go by Caryl Churchill	Royal National Theatre	
2015	Teddy Ferrara by Christopher Shinn	Donmar Warehouse	
2013	The Low Road by Bruce Norris	Royal Court Theatre	
2013	In The Republic of Happiness by Martin Crimp	Royal Court Theatre	
2012	Ding Dong The Wicked by Caryl Churchill	Royal Court Theatre	
2012	Choir Boy by Tarell Alvin McCraney	Royal Court Theatre	
2012	In Basildon by David Eldridge	Royal Court Theatre	
2011	Chicken Soup with Barley by Arnold Wesker	Royal Court Theatre	nominated for Best Director Evening Standard Award
2011	The Comedy of Errors by William Shakespeare	Royal National Theatre	
2010	Clybourne Park by Bruce Norris	Royal Court Theatre transferred to Wyndham's Theatre	Nominated for Best Director Evening Standard Award and Laurence Olivier Award, Won South Bank Show Award, Won the best New Play Evening Standard Award, Critics' Circle Theatre Award, and Laurence Olivier Award
2009	Aunt Dan and Lemon by Wallace Shawn	Royal Court Theatre	
2009	The Fever by Wallace Shawn	Royal Court Theatre	
2009	Seven Jewish Children by Caryl Churchill	Royal Court Theatre	
2008	Wig Out! by Tarell Alvin McCraney	Royal Court Theatre	
2008	Noughts and Crosses based on the book by Malorie Blackman	Royal Shakespeare Company	
2008	Now Or Later by Christopher Shinn	Royal Court Theatre	South Bank Show Award Nomination
2007	Rhinoceros by Eugène Ionesco	Royal Court Theatre	
2007	The Pain and the Itch by Bruce Norris	Royal Court Theatre	
2006	The Crucible by Arthur Miller	Royal Shakespeare Company	Cooke won the Laurence Olivier Award for Best Director and for Best Revival in 2007; it was also the first play to be given 6 stars by Time Out
2006	Pericles by William Shakespeare	Royal Shakespeare Company	
2006	The Winter's Tale by William Shakespeare	Royal Shakespeare Company	
2005	As You Like It by William Shakespeare	Royal Shakespeare Company	WhatsOnStage Award for Best Shakespeare Production
2005	Postcards from America by David Adjmi	Royal Shakespeare Company	
2005	The Magic Flute	Welsh National Opera	
2004	Macbeth by William Shakespeare	Royal Shakespeare Company	
2004	By Bog of Cats by Marina Carr	Wyndham's Theatre	
2003	Cymbeline by William Shakespeare	Royal Shakespeare Company	
2003	The Eccentricities of a Nightingale by Tennessee Williams	Dublin Gate	
2003	La Boheme	Grange Park Opera	
2002	Plasticine by Vassily Sigarev	Royal Court Theatre	Evening Standard Theatre Awards Nomination for Best Director
2002	The People Are Friendly by Michael Wynne	Royal Court Theatre	
2002	Caryl Churchill Events;This is a Chair and Identical Twins	Royal Court Theatre	This is a Chair was co-directed with Ian Rickson
2002	The Malcontent by John Marston	Royal Shakespeare Company	
2001	Spinning into Butter by Rebecca Gilman	Royal Court Theatre	
2001	Redundant by Leo Butler	Royal Court Theatre	
2001	Fucking Games by Grae Cleugh	Royal Court Theatre	
2001	I Capuleti E I Monetecchi	Grange Park Opera	
2000	Other People by Christopher Shinn	Royal Court Theatre	
2000	Fireface by Marius von Mayenburg	Royal Court Theatre	
1998	Arabian Nights	The Young Vic	Later had a UK and world tour, was staged at the New Victory Theater in New York and won the TMA Award
1998	The Bullet by Joe Penhall	Donmar Warehouse	
1997	The Importance of Being Earnest by Oscar Wilde	Atlantic Theatre Festival	
1997	My Mother Said I Never Should by Charlotte Keatley	Oxford Stage Company	it then transferred to the Young Vic
1996	The Weavers by Gerhart Hauptmann	The Gate	
1995	Hunting Scenes From Lower Bavaria by Martin Sperr	The Gate	
	Afore Night Come, Entertaining Mr Sloane	Clwyd	
	Caravan	National Theatre of Norway	
	Kiss of the Spider Woman	Bolton Octagon	
	Of Mice and Men	Nottingham Playhouse	
1991	Autogeddon by Heathcote Williams	Assembly Rooms	Fringe First Award

=== Film ===
Year	Title	Role	Ref
2017	On Chesil Beach	director	
2020	The Courier	director, executive producer	

=== Television ===
Year	Title	Role	Notes	Ref
2016	The Hollow Crown	director	3 episodes	

== Awards and nominations ==
=== Theatre ===
Year	Award	Category	Work	Result
2017	Critics’ Circle Theatre Award	Best Director	Follies	Won
