= David Lean (disambiguation) =

David Lean (1908–1991) was an English film director, producer, screenwriter and editor.

David Lean may also refer to:

- David Lean (athlete) (born 1935), Australian athlete
- David Lean (politician) (born 1945), Australian politician

== See also ==
- David Lean Cinema, a small cinema established in Croydon, London
- (7037) Davidlean, a main-belt asteroid discovered in 1995, named for English film director David Lean.
