= Supporting Wall =

Theatre production company

Supporting Wall was an award-winning London-based theatre and general arts production, promotion and management company, founded in 2008 by producers Ben Monks and Will Young and operated for nine years until 2017. The company's own productions primarily focused on new writing and contemporary theatre, while management and publicity work has included projects across theatre, comedy, film, festivals, live music and dance - including work at the BFI Southbank, Royal National Theatre and many others. During most of this time, Ben Monks and Will Young were also based at the Actors Centre as creative producers for the Tristan Bates Theatre. In November 2023 Will Young was appointed executive director of London's Royal Court Theatre.

== Productions ==
Supporting Wall's original productions include:

| Production | Writer | Director | Venue | Year |
|---|---|---|---|---|
| Blue Heaven | Tennessee Williams | Abigail Graham | Finborough Theatre, London | 2009 |
| Big Breath In | Oscar Wood & Company | Matthew Evans | Tour, London & South East | 2009 |
| Three Shit Hot Shorts | Dean Stalham | Sam Miller, Emily Lim, Pam Brighton | Camden Fringe | 2009 |
| Moonfleece | Philip Ridley | David Mercatali | London & UK Tour | 2010 |
| Election Drama | Various | Various | New Players Theatre | 2010 |
| The Jewish Wife (JMK Award Winner) | Bertolt Brecht | Matthew Evans | Battersea Arts Centre | 2010 |
| Tender Napalm | Philip Ridley | David Mercatali | Southwark Playhouse | 2011 |
| Yellow | Daniel Saleeb | Daniel Saleeb | Tete a Tete Festival / Riverside Studios | 2011 |
| Shallow Slumber | Chris Lee | Mary Nighy | Soho Theatre | 2012 |
| Tender Napalm | Philip Ridley | David Mercatali | UK Tour | 2012 |
| Dark Vanilla Jungle (Fringe First Award winner) | Philip Ridley | David Mercatali | Soho Theatre, London; Royal Exchange, Manchester and Pleasance, Edinburgh Festival | 2013 |
| Our Ajax | Timberlake Wertenbaker | David Mercatali | Southwark Playhouse | 2013 |
| Jonny & the Baptists: The Stop UKIP Tour | Jonny Donahoe & Paddy Gervers | The company | UK Tour / Soho Theatre | 2014 |
| Dark Vanilla Jungle | Philip Ridley | David Mercatali | UK Tour & Soho Theatre | 2014 |
| Jonny & the Baptists: The Satiric Verses | Jonny Donahoe & Paddy Gervers | The company | The Pleasance, Edinburgh Festival | 2014 |
| Bull (Olivier Award Winner) | Mike Bartlett (playwright) | Clare Lizzimore | Young Vic Theatre | 2015 |
| Radiant Vermin | Philip Ridley | David Mercatali | Tobacco Factory Theatre, Bristol / Soho Theatre, London | 2015 |
| Jonny & the Baptists Rock The Vote | Jonny Donahoe & Paddy Gervers | The company | UK Tour & Soho Theatre | 2015 |
| You Look Tasty (A Play By A Tiger) | Stewart Pringle | David Mercatali | The Pleasance, Edinburgh Festival | 2015 |
| Tonight with Donny Stixx | Philip Ridley | David Mercatali | Pleasance, Edinburgh Festival | 2015 |
| Jonny & the Baptists: The End Is Nigh | Jonny Donahoe & Paddy Gervers | The company | Paines Plough Roundabout Theatre (Southbank Centre / Summerhall, Edinburgh Festival) & UK Tour | 2015-16 |
| Octagon | Kristiana Colon | Nadia Latif | Arcola Theatre, London | 2015 |
| Jonny & the Baptists: Eat the Poor | Jonny Donahoe & Paddy Gervers | The company | Paines Plough Roundabout Theatre (Summerhall, Edinburgh Festival) & UK Tour | 2016-17 |
| Radiant Vermin | Philip Ridley | David Mercatali | 59E59 Theaters, New York | 2016 |
| Thirty Christmases | Jonny Donahoe, with Paddy Gervers | Alice Hamilton | Old Fire Station, Oxford & New Diorama Theatre, London | 2017-18 |

== Awards and nominations ==
Supporting Wall's productions have received industry recognition, for Bull the 2015 Olivier Award for Achievement in an Affiliate Theatre; for Dark Vanilla Jungle a Fringe First Award and a nomination for lead actress Gemma Whelan for the Stage Award for Best Solo Performance; for Tender Napalm, Vinette Robinson receiving the 2012 Offie for Best Actress, and a nomination for the Evening Standard Outstanding Newcomer Award for director David Mercatali; for Shallow Slumber (Amy Cudden and Alexandra Gilbreath were nominated for the 2013 Offie for Best Actress and the nominated for the 2012 Offie for Best New Play); and for The Jewish Wife, winning the JMK director's award for Matthew Evans.

Ben Monks and Will Young were jointly nominated for the 2011 & 2012 Offies for Best Producer - Supporting Wall.
