= Lyndsey Marshal =

English actress

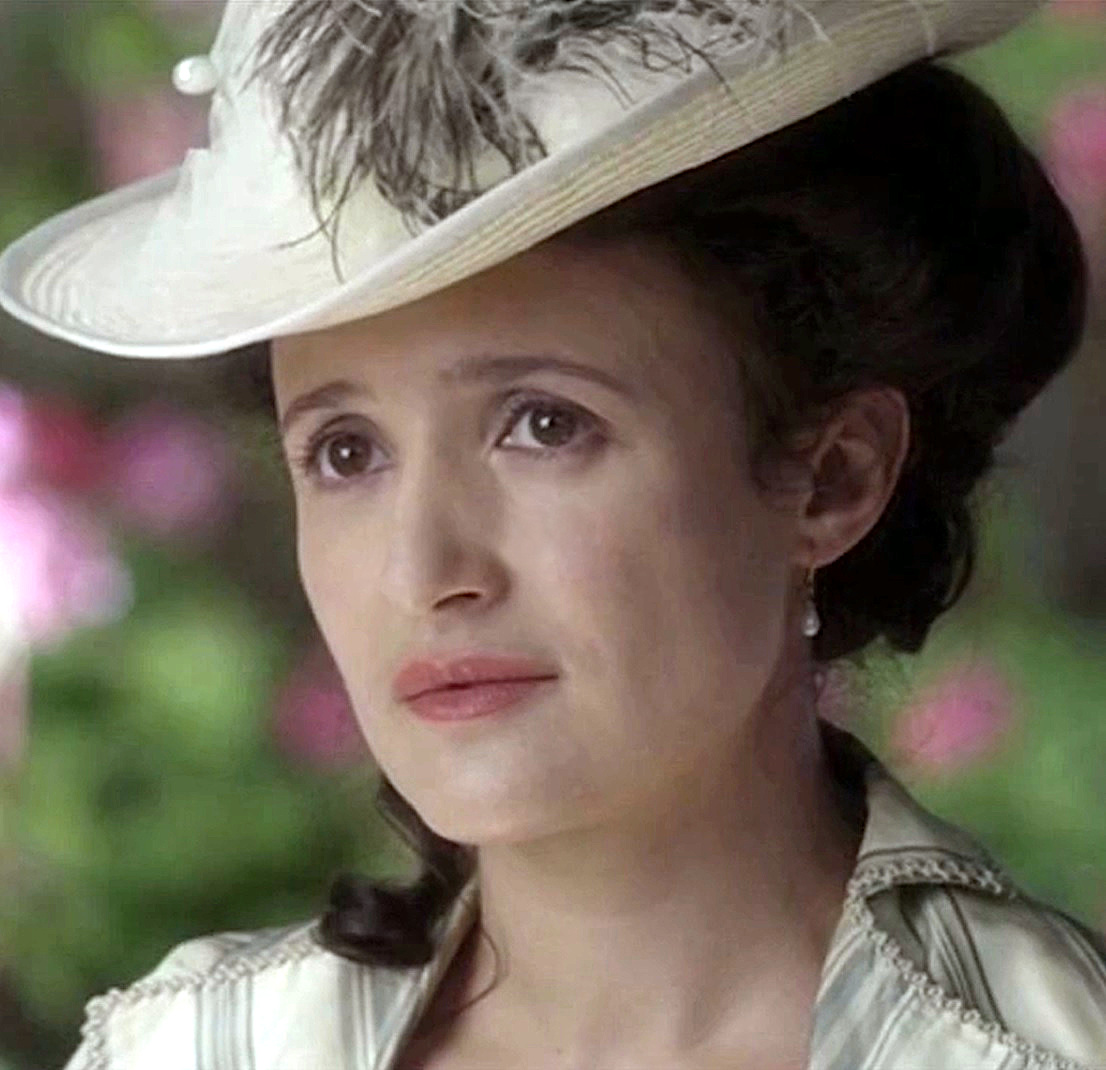
- Marshal in Garrow's Law (Season 2, 2010)
- Born: 16 June 1978 (age 48); Manchester, England
- Education: Royal Welsh College of Music & Drama
- Years active: 2000–present
- Awards: Nominated: Best Supporting Actress; 2002 The Boston Marriage

Lyndsey Marshal (born 16 June 1978) is an English actress best known for her performance in The Hours, as the recurring character Cleopatra on HBO's Rome, and as Lady Sarah Hill in BBC period drama Garrow's Law.

== Biography ==
Marshal was born in Manchester, England. She attended Old Trafford Junior School and Lostock High School. After studying the classics at college for a career in archaeology, she applied to the Royal Welsh College of Music and Drama.

Her first major part was in the play Fireface at the Royal Court Theatre, which she took just before graduation. In 2001, she won the Critics' Circle Theatre Award for Best Newcomer in 2001 for her performances in Redundant at the Royal Court Theatre and Boston Marriage at the Donmar Warehouse. In 2003, she won the TMA Theatre Award for Best Supporting Actress in A Midsummer Night's Dream. She appeared alongside James McAvoy in the 2009 West End production Three Days of Rain. In 2011, she appeared in Greenland at the National Theatre.

Marshal has appeared in the films The Hours alongside Nicole Kidman, and Hereafter, directed by Clint Eastwood.

Marshal starred as Cleopatra in HBO's Rome. Since 2009, she has played Lady Sarah Hill in the three series of the BBC One drama Garrow's Law and, with Julie Walters, in the BBC TV film A Short Stay in Switzerland. She starred also in ITV's new series of Agatha Christie's Marple.

In January 2013, Marshal played Eileen Blair, wife of Eric Blair, in the BBC Radio 4 drama The Real George Orwell – Homage to Catalonia. She also played Queen Gertrude in the radio drama series "Elsinore".

== Filmography ==
=== Film ===
Year	Film	Role	Notes
2002	The Hours	Lottie Hop	
2003	Stories of Lost Souls	Simon's Girlfriend	Segment: "Standing Room Only"
2004	The Calcium Kid	Mags Livingston	
2005	Frozen	Tracey	
2005	Festival	Faith Myers	
2005	Snuff-Movie	Sandy / X / Janice	
2008	1234	Emily	
2010	Hereafter	Jackie	
2010	No Pressure	Schoolteacher	Short film produced by climate change mitigation campaign 10:10. Uncredited role
2012	In the Dark Half	Kathy	
2013	National Theatre Live: Othello	Emilia	Season 5 live broadcast on 26 September 2013
2014	The Forgotten	Sarah	
2016	Trespass Against Us	Kelly Cutler	
2019	The Invisible	Tor Irving	
2024	Restless	Nicky	
2024	Up the Catalogue	Hailey Cartin	
TBA	To Love a Narcissist	Charlotte	Post-production
TBA	Truly Naked	Julia	Post-production

=== Television ===
Year	Film	Role	Notes
2000	Peak Practice	Natalie Pearce	Series 10; episode 12: "Masquerade"
2002	The Gathering Storm	Peggy	Television film
2002	Midsomer Murders	Emma Tysoe	Series 5; episode 3: "Ring Out Your Dead"
2003	Sons & Lovers	Miriam Leivers	Television film
2003	The Young Visiters	Ethel Monticue	Television film
2005	Born and Bred	Mary Pilling	Series 4; episode 4: "Never Seek to Tell"
2005	Agatha Christie's Poirot	Anne Meredith	Series 10; episode 2: "Cards on the Table"
2005–2007	Rome	Cleopatra	Series 1; episode 8, and series 2; episodes 2 and 8–10
2007	Green	Izzie	Television film
2007	The Shadow in the North	Isabel Meredith	Television film
2008	Kiss of Death	George Austen	Television film. Also known as Breathless and Blood Rush
2008	Agatha Christie's Marple	Amy Gibbs	Series 4; episode 2: "Murder Is Easy"
2009	A Short Stay in Switzerland	Jessica	Television film
2009	10 Minute Tales	Gemma	Episode 3: "Ding Dong"
2009–2011	Garrow's Law	Lady Sarah Hill	Series 1–3; 12 episodes
2010	Being Human	Prof. Lucy Jaggat	Series 2; episodes 1–8
2010	Playhouse: Live	Hannah	Episode 2: "Ghost Story"
2012	The Cricklewood Greats	Florrie Fontaine	Television film
2012	Titanic	Mabel Watson	Mini-series; episodes 1–4
2012	Blackout	Lucy Demoys	Mini-series; episodes 1–3
2014	Inside No. 9	Laura	Series 1; episode 5: "The Understudy"
2014	That Day We Sang	Sal	Television film
2015	The Embrace	Iona	Episodes 1–5
2015	From Darkness	Lucy Maxley	Mini-series; episodes 1, 3 and 4
2016	Silent Witness	Sasha Blackburn	Series 19; episodes 5 and 6: "Life Licence: Parts 1 and 2"
2017	The League of Gentlemen	Ellie	Series 4; episodes 1–3
2018	Trauma	Susie Bowker	Mini-series; episodes 1–3
2019	Hanna	Rachel	Series 1; 4 episodes
2019	Agatha and the Curse of Ishtar	Agatha Christie	Television film
2020	Dracula	Bloxham	Mini-series; episode 3: "The Dark Compass"
2022	Inside Man	Mary Watling	Episodes 1–4
2024	Inside No. 9	Party Guest	Series 9; episode 6: "Plodding On"
2024	Insomnia	Caroline Mitchell	Episodes 1–6
2025	Death in Paradise	Sadie Jones	Series 14; episode 8

=== Theatre ===
Year	Title	Role	Company	Director
2000	Fireface	Olga	Royal Court Theatre	Dominic Cooke
	Top Girls	Shona / Kit / Waitress	New Vic Theatre	Roxanna Silbert
2001–02	Boston Marriage	Catherine	Donmar Warehouse / West End	Phyllida Lloyd
2001–02	Redundant	Lucy	Royal Court Theatre	Dominic Cooke
2003	A Midsummer Night's Dream	Hermia	Bristol Old Vic	David Farr
	Bright	Polly	Soho Theatre	Paul Jepson
2004	The Crucible	Mary Warren	Sheffield Crucible	Anna Mackmin
2004–05	Sleeping Beauty	Beauty	Young Vic / New Victory Theater NYC	Rufus Norris
2005	Blood Wedding	Wife	Almeida Theatre	Rufus Norris
2005–06	The Hypochondriac	Toinette	Almeida Theatre	Lindsay Posner
2007	A Matter of Life and Death	June	Olivier Theatre	Emma Rice
2007	Absurdia	Lucienne / Uncle Ted	Donmar Warehouse	Douglas Hodge
2008	The Pride	Sylvia	Royal Court Theatre	Jamie Lloyd
2009	Three Days of Rain	Nan / Lina	Apollo Theatre	Lindsay Posner
2013	Othello	Emilia	Olivier Theatre	Nicholas Hytner
2015	Oresteia	Clytemnestra	HOME, Manchester	Blanche McIntyre
2018	The Wild Duck (by Robert Icke, after Ibsen)	Gina	Almeida Theatre	Robert Icke
2021	Force Majeure	Ebba	Donmar Warehouse	Michael Longhurst

== Awards ==
- 2001 Critics' Circle Theatre Award Best Newcomer (Redundant / The Boston Marriage)
- nomination 2002 Evening Standard Award Best Newcomer (Redundant / The Boston Marriage)
- nomination 2002 Olivier Award Best Supporting Actress (The Boston Marriage)
- 2003 TMA Theatre Award Best Supporting Actress (A Midsummer Night's Dream)
- nomination 2006 Ian Charleson Award (The Hypochondriac)
- 2016 1st International Film Festival & Awards – Macao Best Actress (Trespass Against Us)
