= Trystan Gravelle =

Welsh actor (born 1981)

- Born: 4 May 1981 (age 45); Trimsaran, Carmarthenshire, Wales
- Education: Ysgol Gyfun Y Strade; Royal Academy of Dramatic Art
- Occupation: Actor
- Years active: 2010–present

Trystan Gravelle (born 4 May 1981) is a Welsh theatre, film and television actor.

== Life and career ==
Gravelle was born in the village of Trimsaran in Carmarthenshire. He attended Ysgol Gyfun Y Strade. He was a member of the Llanelli Youth Theatre between 1997 and 1999 before becoming a student at the Royal Academy of Dramatic Art.

After graduation from RADA, Gravelle joined the Royal Shakespeare Company.

In 2010, he performed D. C. Moore's monologue Honest at the Edinburgh Fringe Festival at Milne's Bar as part of the Assembly programme.

In 2011, he appeared opposite Rhys Ifans and Vanessa Redgrave in the feature film Anonymous, which contests the authorship of Shakespeare's plays, as Christopher Marlowe. Gravelle missed attending the film's London premiere due to starring in a London production of Mike Bartlett's National Theatre production 13.

In 2012, he joined the main cast of the ITV period drama series Mr Selfridge as Victor Colleano, assistant manager of the department store's restaurant. In the summer of 2012 he was named one of the 'Stars of Tomorrow' by Screen International. Gravelle filmed Mr Selfridge between April and October, and the series débuted in the United Kingdom in January 2013.

In 2016, Gravelle played the young Paul Finchley in the Channel 4 drama National Treasure. In 2018, he played the vampire, Baldwin De Clairmont, in the Sky One Production A Discovery of Witches.

Since 2022, he played Ar-Pharazôn in The Lord of the Rings: The Rings of Power series on Amazon Prime. Co-star Morfydd Clark mentioned enjoying speaking in Welsh on-set with Gravelle and Owain Arthur.

== Selected credits ==
Year(s)	Title	Role	More information
2010	Honest	Dave	Theatre
2011	13	John	Theatre
2011	Anonymous	Christopher Marlowe	Feature film
2013	One Chance	Matthew	Feature film
2013–2016	Mr Selfridge	Victor Colleano	Series regular
2016	The Aliens	Fabien	Series regular
2016	National Treasure	The young Paul Finchley	Mini-series regular
2017	Gap Year	Eugene	Episode 1
2017	Beast	Clifford	Feature film
2018	The Terror	Henry Foster Collins	Series regular
2018, 2021	A Discovery of Witches	Baldwin Montclair	Series regular
2019–2021	Baptiste	Greg	TV series
2019	Britannia	Derog	TV series (1 episode)
2020	Quiz	Adrian Pollock	Mini-series regular
2022–present	The Lord of the Rings: The Rings of Power	Ar-Pharazôn	Series regular
2023	Great Expectations	Compeyson	TV miniseries
