= Presnyakov brothers =

The Presnyakov Brothers–Oleg and Vladimir—are Russian writers, playwrights, screenwriters, directors, theatrical producers, and actors.

Oleg was born in 1969 and Vladimir in 1974. They are the sons of an Iranian mother and a Russian father. Both brothers graduated from M. Gorky Urals State University in Yekaterinburg, Sverdlovsk Oblast. Until recently, they were faculty members at the same university: Oleg in literary theory and philology, and Vladimir in literary theory and psychology. Together, they founded the university's Youth Theatre, "Theatre under the name of Christina Orbakaite," which is dedicated to producing experimental theatrical works. The brothers write collaboratively, and all their plays are presented and published under their joint name, The Presnyakov Brothers.

Known for their attention to natural-sounding dialogue, the Presnyakov Brothers are praised in Russia for their linguistic precision. Their works often feature sardonic wit, combining humor and bitterness to explore life in post-Soviet Russian society.

Since the premiere of their first play in Moscow, The Presnyakov Brothers have become "something of a trademark," according to The Moscow Times in 2004.

== Bibliography ==
=== Plays ===
- Z.O.B (1999)
- Floor Covering (2000)
- Europe-Asia (2000)
- Terrorism (2000)
- Set-1 (2001)
- Set-2 (2001)
- Captured Spirits (2002)
- Playing the Victim (2002)
- Bad Bed Stories (2003)
- Something About Technologies of How to Live Life (2003)
- Resurrection. Super. (2004)
- Pub (2005)
- Before the Flood (2006)
- Magic Horse (2008)
- Hungaricum (2009)

=== Screenplays ===
Bed Stories (Postelnye stseny, Постельные сцены) (2005); directed by Kirill Serebrennikov

Playing the Victim (Izobrazhaja zhertvu, Изображая жертву) (2006); directed by Kirill Serebrennikov

- Grand Prize Winner, 1st Rome Film Festival, Italy (Cinema 2006), 13–21 October 2006
- Best Screenplay Award, Russia, 2007

Europe-Asia (Европа-Азия) (2009); directed by Ivan Dykhovichny (Иван Дыховичный)

Day D. (День Д) (2008); directed by Mikhail Porechenkov (Михаил Пореченков)

=== Novels ===
- Let's Kill the Referee! (Братья Пресняковы: Убить судью) (2005)

Language: Russian

- Translated into German (2007) as Brüder Presnjakow: Töten den Schiedsrichter, published by Kiepenheuer & Witsch, Cologne
- Translated into Hungarian (2007) as Oleg és Vlagyimir Presznyakov: Öljük meg a bírót!, published by Gabo Kiado, Budapest
- Translated into Romanian (2009) as Frații Presniakov: Ucide arbitrul!, published by Editura Art, Bucharest
- Playing the Victim: The Novel (Russian)
- Europe-Asia: The Novel (Европа — Азия) published by AST (АСТ, Астрель), Moscow, 2009, in Russian

=== Radio ===
- A Weekend in the Country

Produced by BBC Radio 3 as part of Drama of the Week: Fear and Loathing in Russia Today, 2017, translated by Noah Birksted-Breen (Sputnik Theatre Company)

=== Plays published in English ===
- Terrorism, Nick Hern Books, London, 2003. Language: English
- Playing the victim, Nick Hern Books, London, 2003. Language: English

=== Plays published in Russian ===
- The Best, Eksmo (Эксмо), Moscow, 2005

Contains: Playing the Victim, Floor Covering, Captured Spirits, Terrorism, Something About Technologies of How to Live Life

Language: Russian

- Pub, AST (АСТ, Астрель), Moscow, 2008

Contains: Bad Bed Stories, Before the Flood, Pub

== Terrorism ==
Terrorism is the Presnyakov Brothers' best-known and most widely performed play.

=== Synopsis ===
The play is composed of six scenes from urban life. Delayed passengers grumble about a bomb scare at the airport. A man and a woman commit adultery. Office workers argue while one of their colleagues quietly leaves to hang herself. Two elderly women in a playground complain about their husbands and mock a man seated nearby. Policemen quarrel in their barracks. Finally, the passengers on the plane prepare for take-off. By the end, it becomes clear that these seemingly random scenes are connected by a subtle thread, suggesting that individuals bear responsibility for one another even within a fragmented urban society.

=== Productions ===
The play premiered at the Chekhov Moscow Art Theatre in 2002, directed by Kirill Serebrennikov. It won the theatre's annual competition for best new play, an award funded by the Russian Ministry of Culture.

In 2003, the Royal Court Theatre in London staged a production translated by Sasha Dugdale, directed by Ramin Gray, and designed by Hildegard Bechtler. The play was both a critical and popular success.

Since its debut, Terrorism has been performed across Europe, including in Germany, Sweden, Poland, Norway, Spain, Ireland, and Estonia, as well as internationally in Australia, Chile, Brazil, and Taiwan.

The American premiere took place off-Broadway in May 2005 in a co-production between The New Group and The Play Company at the Clurman Theater, Theatre Row, New York. The production was directed by Will Frears, with set design by David Korins and costumes by Sarah Beers.

In June 2005, the Studio Theatre in Washington, D.C., staged a production directed by Keith Alan Baker.

In Canada, the play premiered in Toronto in April 2008, directed by Adam Bailey and produced by Royal Porcupine Productions.

Fragments of the play in English were also published in English Studies Forum by Kevin Ewert of the University of Pittsburgh at Bradford.

== Playing the Victim ==
Playing the Victim was first staged at the Traverse Theatre as part of the Edinburgh Fringe Festival in 2003, in a co-production with the Royal Court Theatre and Told by an Idiot. The production was directed by Richard Wilson.

=== Synopsis ===
The play follows Valya, a student who takes a job playing the victim in police crime-scene reconstructions. Although the murders he acts out are simulated, his repeated participation in violent deaths underscores the brutality of contemporary life. A parallel plot parodies Shakespeare: the ghost of Valya's father reveals that he was poisoned by his brother, who has since married Valya's mother. The finale occurs in a Japanese restaurant, where Valya serves his mother, uncle, and insistent girlfriend a meal of fugu, a fish that can be deadly if not prepared correctly.

An alternative synopsis describes the play as the story of a young man who drops out of university and applies for a job with the police—not as an officer, but as the victim in crime-scene reenactments. He is haunted by a fear of death, and through repeated encounters with simulated violence, attempts to come to terms with his own mortality.

=== Productions and reception ===
In the British staging of Playing the Victim, the police captain overseeing the reenactments is himself murdered, with his death then reconstructed by another captain. Such ironic rewritings reflect the Presnyakov Brothers' recurring themes of absurdity and cyclical violence.

The Presnyakovs later adapted the play into a film, also titled Playing the Victim. Directed by Kirill Serebrennikov, the film won the Best Film Prize at the 2006 Rome Film Festival.

== Interviews ==
The Presnyakov Brothers have been featured in several international interviews.

In a 2006 Time magazine interview titled "Two for the Road," conducted by Yuri Zarakhovich, the brothers discussed their creative process and worldview.

Oleg Presnyakov noted, "A life on the go adds grist to our impression mill." Vladimir Presnyakov added that their works are often rewritten: "We love remaking our works. Playing with our characters again and again lets us see how their situations are developing."

They also reflected on their collaborative identity. "We have often wondered if just one of us exists, while the other is just a figment of his imagination," said Vladimir. Oleg added, "Except we never got to sort out which of us is which."

Commenting on broader themes, Vladimir remarked: "People are very informed about what's happening in the world, but it seems to us it's important that people be conscious of the idea and not fence off or partition their fears."

== Reviews ==
The works of the Presnyakov Brothers have been widely reviewed in both Russian and international media. Notable reviews include:

- The Guardian, review by Michael Billington (critic), 5 stars, 15 March 2003.
- The Times (UK), "Chekhov's Children: An Exciting New Generation of Russian Playwrights Is Coming Here," by Patrick Marmion, 20 January 2003.
- The New Yorker, review by John Lahr, 6 June 2005.
- The New York Times, review by Ben Brantley, 24 May 2005.
- The New York Times, interview with the Presnyakov Brothers by Erin E. Arvedlund, 29 May 2005.
- The Washington Post, review by Peter Marks, 11 June 2005.
- The International Herald Tribune, article by Erin E. Arvedlund, 27 May 2005.
- Broadway.com, review by William Stevenson, 2005.
- The Internet Theater Bookshop (review).
- BroadwayWorld.com (review).
- TheaterMania.com, review by Brian Scott Lipton, 24 May 2005.
- The Times Literary Supplement (TLS100), online review by Sharrona Pearl, 2003.
- The New Group production history (archival entry).
- The Nation, article by Pawit Mahasarinand, 11 January 2008.
