= Juicy Fruits =

Play written by Leo Butler

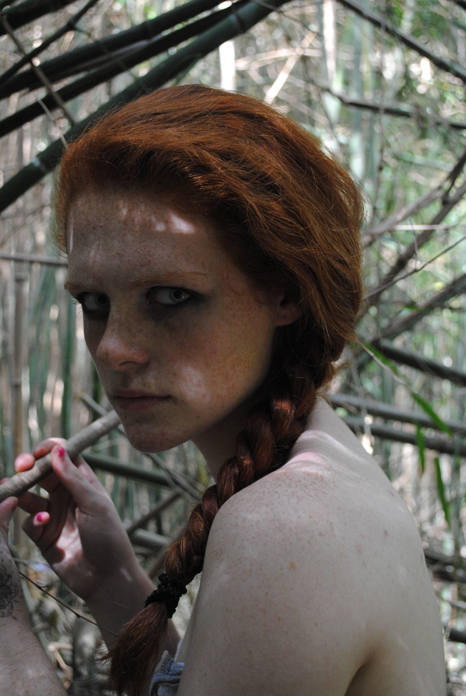
- Written by: Leo Butler
- Characters: 2 female and 1 male
- Subject: Motherhood, the Environment
- Genre: One Act Play
- Setting: A cafe, a rainforest

Juicy Fruits is a one-act comedic play by Leo Butler that was produced by touring theatre company Paines Plough in 2011. The cast featured Denise Hoey and Clare Waugh and it was directed by George Perrin, touring nationally to Oran Mor in Glasgow, Traverse Theatre in Edinburgh, Royal Exchange, Manchester, and Belgrade Theatre in Coventry. The main part of the play takes place in a coffeeshop where two old University friends, Nina and Lorna, are reunited after many years. The action then jumps to the Borneo jungle at the play's climax.

== Reviews ==
Joyce McMillan of The Scotsman described Juicy Fruits as an exploration of "the ambivalent experience of motherhood", ending with "an almost surreal meditation on the relationship between western humanity and the planet we have ravaged". Mark Fisher of The Guardian called it "fine as a silly study of eccentricity, but unconvincing when it offers a psychological explanation for Nina's behaviour".

Nathan Shreeve of The Public Review considered it "[b]rilliantly witty, acerbic and dark. Butler’s script is superb, flashing from brilliant humour, to heart wrenching emotional breakdown", with the character of Nina delivering some "truly stunning (and shocking) lines of dialogue". He praised the work for prompting "a question I was not expecting to be asking at the end of a seemingly light-hearted piece".
