= Favourite Fears =

Studio album by The Earlybirds
- Released: 23 August 2010
- Recorded: 2010
- Genre: Pop rock
- Label: Little Arrows Music

Favourite Fears is the debut album by New Zealand band The Earlybirds. It entered the New Zealand Charts at number seven, remaining there for three weeks.

== Track listing ==
1. "Cold to the Touch"
2. "Low"
3. "I Can't Live Without You"
4. "On Your Shoulder"
5. "Truth"
6. "Runaway"
7. "No You in Youth"
8. "Metaphobia"
9. "I Killed the DJ"
10. "Kill to Love"
11. "Sleep"

== Personnel ==
Filip Kostovich - Vocals / Keys
Mike Cannon - Guitar
Jared Aisher - Bass
Sean Patterson - Drums
Kane Ter Veers - Guitar / Backing Vocals
