= 13 (play) =

2011 play by Mike Bartlett

- Play script cover artwork.
- Written by: Mike Bartlett
- Genre: Drama
- Setting: London, United Kingdom

Premiere
- Date premiered: 18 October 2011
- Place premiered: National Theatre, London

13 is a 2011 play by Mike Bartlett. It premiered at the National Theatre, London, in October 2011 and centres around John, a christ-like figure, who returns from absence to preach an anti-war movement.

== Production history ==
The play premiered at the National Theatre, London, on 18 October 2011, directed by Thea Sharrock, with Trystan Gravelle as John and Shane Zaza as Zia.

In 2014, the play premiered at the Chapter Arts Centre, Cardiff.

== Reception ==
Michael Billington of The Guardian awarded the play four stars and stating that Bartlett had written a "powerful, disturbing play", and described the set design of the production as "excellently served" by Thea Sharrock and Tom Scutt.

Charles Spencer of The Telegraph gave the play three stars, stating his main problem with it was the Jesus-like hero, John, believing that he'd never gain such a following and describing him as a "sanctimonious Welsh windbag". Spencer also found the set design of the National Theatre production failing to capture the atmosphere of modern London. He compared the play to Bartlett's previous one, Earthquakes in London, which made him feel spellbound, whilst 13 made him feeling fidgety.

== Print ==
The play was published by Bloomsbury Methuen, an imprint of Bloomsbury Publishing, on October 16, 2013.
