= Redundant (play) =

Play written by Leo Butler

- Written by: Leo Butler
- Original language: English

Premiere
- Date premiered: 2001; Royal Court in London
- Place premiered: Britain

Redundant by Leo Butler premiered at the Royal Court Theatre in 2001 starring Lyndsey Marshal and directed by Dominic Cooke.

Set in seventeen-year-old Lucy's Sheffield council flat, the play follows a year in the promiscuous teenager's life as she makes one disastrous choice after another. It is a dark, often humorous, examination of social poverty. In the introduction in his collected volume of plays, Butler writes of his central character, "Though she is a victim of poverty - in particular, poverty of imagination and of opportunity - Lucy is never a victim in her own home. She never gives up, and both her dreams, however delusional, and her tough, oppositional spirit remain unspoiled even by the end of the play."

It contained the first ever reference in theatre to Osama bin Laden where a character said that the whole country needed to be bombed by him to teach us all what suffering was. The play premiered at Royal Court on 12 September 2001 (the day after the attacks on the World Trade Center), receiving gasps from the audience.

The production is well known for its use of the downstairs stage at Royal court where the overhead arch had been lowered throughout the play until the final scene where it was raised as Lucy sat on the bed making her appear smaller and smaller and more and more redundant to the action.

Leo Butler won the 2001 George Devine Most Promising Playwright Award for the play.

Lyndsey Marshal won the 2001 Critics' Circle Theatre Award for Best Newcomer for her performance in the play.

== Reviews ==
Aleks Sierz writing for The Stage commented that the play was "written with gobsmacking psychological realism", applauding Butler's text for being "full of evasions, projections and concealed aggression". "This scorching drama", he concluded, "is raw, raucous and disturbing, with a final stage picture of almost intolerable bleakness."

Lyn Gardner of The Guardian felt that the author "has an acute ear for the cadences of everyday speech, and he shapes the narrative with impressive skill. But he tells you nothing that you haven't heard before: some people's lives are desperate and awful, some women will do anything to feel loved, and men are either useless or bastards, and sometimes both."

The Metro wrote that "Leo Butler's remarkable first full-length play has the acutely observed, unapologetic realism of a social documentary", claiming that "its episodic structure reads like blueprint snapshots of teenage life on sink estates in Sheffield". The review also praised lead actress Lyndsey Marshal who "beautifully played" the lead character, Lucy, "as a not entirely sympathetic mix of vicious brattishness and childlike vulnerability." While The Times added that "Dominic Cooke's taut direction ensures strong performance all round" in "an excellent production".

The Evening Standard praised the "witty, sinister and finally depressing drama", adding that "Butler boldly creates a psychologically complex female lead, surrounding her with unjudged dead-beats, each distinctively vocalising caustic Sheffield Vernacular. He also looks to be a master of stage craft, subtly manipulating his audience and characters with dramatic reversals, before arriving at an ending that is inevitable, surprising and loaded with pity and fear".

== Articles ==
- The Independent
