= Made of Stone (play) =

Play by Leo Butler

- A & C Black's Plays One by Leo Butler
- Written by: Leo Butler
- Characters: Gary eldest brother stuck in Shefflied; Miles middle brother racist loser Pete youngest brother, unstable mess Elaine the three brothers' mother Carol Pete's young girlfriend Errol Miles' black friend from work
- Subject: masculinity, grief, industry, racism, sexual fantasy
- Setting: Sheffield; a kitchen, a bedroom, a building site, a hilltop, a car, a living room

Premiere
- Date: 2000; Royal Court in London

Made of Stone is the first play by Leo Butler, first performed as part of the Young Writers' Festival at the Royal Court in London in 2000.

Butler called the play, which is named after the Stone Roses' 1989 song of the same title, his 'love letter' to Sheffield. Butler says that the starting point for any of his plays is an image here he claimed it was that of two brothers standing by their father's grave. The play centres on three brothers coming to terms with their father's death. Time Out praised it as a corrosive examination of manhood, capturing a regional way of living, once bound by heavy industry, manual labour and close, interlocking friendships, now brought to its knees.

The most famous scene in the play is an Oedipus complex scene where two teenagers have role play sex and the young man unbeknownst to the woman asks her to call him by his father's name while he calls her by his mother's. What's on in London praised it as one of the most excruciating scenes of teenage sex ever staged.

The play was published in a collection of his work issued by A & C Black.

== Characters ==
Gary – Thirty years old and the eldest brother. He gains a place to go to college down in London but refuses it knowing that his family needs him.

Miles – Twenty eight and the racist middle brother, he fights with younger brother Pete. Loses his job as a builder when he accidentally breaks a wall. He changes his racist views after he forms a friendship with Errol, but is subsequently conned by him.

Pete – Twenty one and the youngest brother. He is a mess after their father's death and struggles to cope. He begins a relationship with Carol, whom he refers to as Elaine during sex.

Elaine – Early fifties and the three brothers' mother. She goes out partying and drinking heavily in her struggle to cope with the loss of her husband.

Carol – Sixteen. Having a bad relationship with her parents and convinced of her own little worth, she moves in with Pete, even though he scares her with his erratic behaviour.

Errol – Twenty eight, black, he tells Miles that his wife is cheating on him to gain sympathy and they go to set up a business together. He ends up conning Miles out of what is left of his inheritance money.

== Overview ==
Three brothers in Sheffield struggle with grief after their father's death. They find it hard to place themselves in a changed community resorting to racism, violence, sex all on a quest to try to become the men that they would like to be. Pete begins to sleep with the young and self hating Carol using her in incestuous role play games. Miles having lost his job harbours racist views for his supposed friend Errol. Gary is trapped in Sheffield unwilling to move on fearing to leave his family.

== Synopsis ==
scene one Gary and Pete stand by their father's year old grave, they discuss their brother Miles who has not come, Gary asks Pete to come home, he refuses.
scene two Miles and Errol who works with him at the building site play pool in the pub. Miles is in debt having not paid his Council Tax, Pete is working in the pub, the pair fight. Pete chats up underage Carol who is sitting at the bar.
scene three Elaine gets ready to go to karaoke, she finds out Gary has got a place at a London college, he is unenthusiastic when she praises him.
scene four Pete tells Carol he is going to call her Elaine during sex and asks her to call him Donald. She asks who they are, he won't tell her.
scene five Miles and Errol on the site are building a wall. Miles is distressed about the council tax and his father's death, he starts to cry leaning on the wall which collapses from under him.
scene six Carol moves in with Pete, happy at the idea that it will upset her parents.
scene seven Miles tells Gary that he has lost his job claiming that Errol pushed him into the wall. Gary tells him to report it but Miles insists nothing will be done as Errol is black and the system has become prejudiced against white people. Elaine comes in and tells them she is going on a date with a man from Jamaica they are stunned.
scene eight Carol puts on make up trying to make herself look good for Pete who encourages her to drink.
scene nine Miles is jogging, Errol finds him and begs him to babysit that night, he agrees as he needs the money.
scene ten Pete in the car refuses to tell Carol where they are going instead turning the radio up.
scene eleven Gary calls his ex-girlfriend Sophie from a phone box and asks her for a drink, his money runs out before he can tell her his number though. Elaine falls against the box outside very drunk, Gary is alarmed at first thinking she has been attacked.
scene twelve Pete jumps out of the car and walks off, reluctantly Carol follows.
scene thirteen Miles is frustrated by the baby crying and starts to steal Errol's stuff. Errol returns however and he quickly replaces everything and comforts a distressed Errol who says he has just caught his wife cheating on him.
scene fourteen Carol is woken up by Pete, they are on top of a hill having slept there. he tells her he used to go on these masculine treks with his father that his brothers would never do. He starts to bang a stone against his chest until Carol stops him and he is bleeding.
scene fifteen Gary and Elaine argue over the night before, Gary refuses to go to London claiming everything is in too much of a mess.
scene sixteen Carol takes Pete back to the car, and tells him that she is going to go back to living with her parents.
scene seventeen Errol and Miles in the pub seem like good friends and plan a business together where Miles could use the money he has been left in his father's will.
scene eighteen Elaine goes to her husband's grave who it is revealed to have been called Donald. She tells him that she needs to let him go.
scene nineteen Gary goes over to see a depressed Pete, he manages to cheer him up.
scene twenty Elaine tries to comfort Miles who tells her that he went to Errol's house only to be told by his sister that he had come into some money (Miles' investment) and moved back to Spain with his wife and daughter, it had all been a con. Pete and Gary arrive for dinner and the family sit down, the play ends with Elaine's line 'Well. This is nice'.

== Reviews ==
The extract of the review quoted on the back of Leo Butler's collected work for Made of Stone is from Time Out

a corrosive examination of manhood, capturing a regional way of living, once bound by heavy industry, manual labour and close inter-locking friendships, now brought to its knees Time Out

What's on in London said it was

written in a blaze of fury with emotions bouncing off the walls like whacking great billiard balls, the play both howls with rage and an acute examination of the individual roots of macho posturing and racist attitudes
