= All You Need is LSD =

British 2018 play

- Written by: Leo Butler
- Original language: English

Premiere
- Date premiered: 2018
- Place premiered: Birmingham Repertory Theatre

All You Need is LSD is a comedy-drama play by Leo Butler commissioned by the Birmingham Repertory Theatre. It was co-produced and performed by Told by an Idiot theatre company, and toured various venues across the UK including Unity Theatre, Liverpool, Tobacco Factory Theatre in Bristol, The Lowry in Salford, and Belgrade Theatre in Coventry. The company of four actors (two male/two female) portrayed hundreds of characters. It was directed by Paul Hunter and Stephen Harper.

== Synopsis ==
The play begins with the true story of author Leo Butler who is trying to write a play about the history of LSD. He meets former Government Drugs Tsar David Nutt, who persuades Leo to take part in an LSD drug trial as part of his research. After Leo is injected with the drug, the play transforms into a psychedelic history tour of LSD, inspired by Alice in Wonderland and Monty Python's The Meaning of Life, in which public figures such as Timothy Leary, The Beatles, Albert Hofmann and many others - including the author himself -, recount their own psychedelic experiences in a variety of comedic scenes, songs and sketches. The play climaxes with a poignant dramatisation of the death of Aldous Huxley, followed by a fantasy sequence in which Doctor Who visits a utopian future in which Leo Butler's play All You Need is LSD has brought about world peace. At the end of the play, the author leaves the hospital and returns home. Having failed to finish the play, he tells his daughter a bedtime story.

== Reception ==
In their review of the play, Arts City Liverpool claimed "All You Need is LSD is quite a party – complete with mind-bending moments and a starring role for a pat of Lurpak butter. It’s a history lesson full of knowing nods and arch asides, and a cerebrally entertaining romp through the Technicolor tale of “the most interesting drug of all time."

Mark Fisher of The Guardian said Butler's play is "a formal departure from his customary narrative style to fashion a self-aware theatrical collage full of postmodern meta-commentary."

Matt Truman, writing for the New York Times, wrote that “All You Need Is LSD" unfolds as a potted history of LSD — a magical mystery tour. The structure is slippery, freewheeling and associative, with scenes folding back on themselves and historical figures popping up out of the blue."

The Reviews Hub described the play as "a trippy stream-of-consciousness flitting from place to place and character to character, assisted by imaginative direction from Paul Hunter & Stephen Harper. It gleefully smashes the fourth wall and congratulates itself un-self-consciously as it does so."

The Stage remarked "though it’s something of a muddle, there’s a coherent conceit behind Leo Butler’s new comedy. We get the Swiss scientist Albert Hofmann discovering the drug in 1938 and promptly tripping his nuts off. We get iconic American psychologist Timothy Leary – a yodelling, hyperactive Jack Hunter – protesting about its criminalisation. We even get Butler himself – gender-swapped, and played with spaced-out friendliness by Annie Fitzmaurice – weaving in his own experiences with acid throughout. There’s also the moving LSD-alleviated death of Aldous Huxley, plenty of Alice in Wonderland bits, and even an extended Doctor Who adventure into the future to finish."
