= Old Joint Stock Theatre =

Studio theatre and pub in Birmingham, England

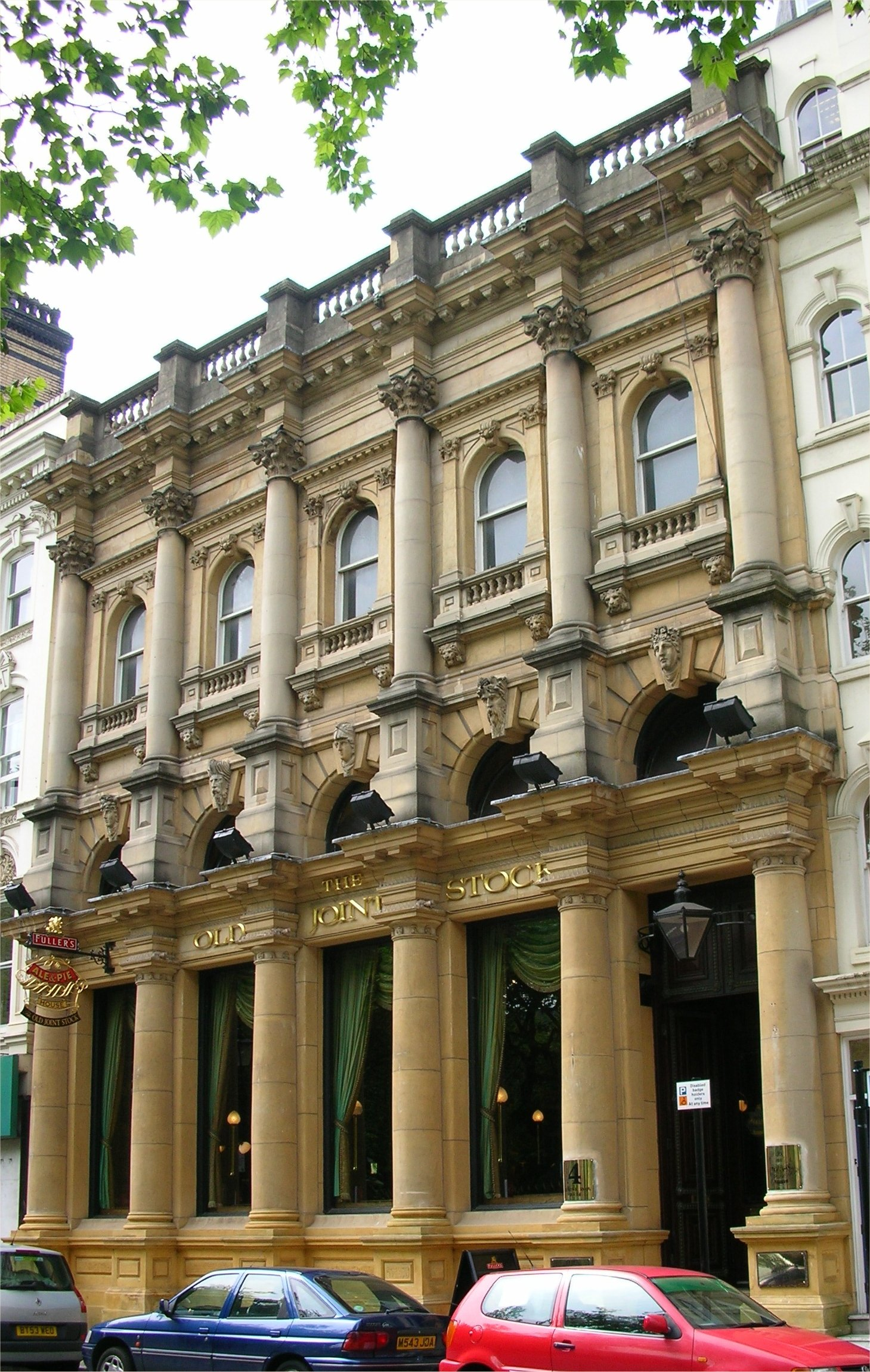
- Old Joint Stock Theatre façade
- Interactive map of Old Joint Stock Theatre
- Address: 4 Temple Row West; Birmingham; England
- Coordinates: 52.481111°N 1.9°W
- Owner: Fuller, Smith and Turner
- Capacity: 95
- Current use: pub and theatre

Construction
- Opened: building built 1864
- Years active: theatre since 1997

Website
- The Old Joint Stock Theatre

The Old Joint Stock Theatre is a studio theatre and pub located at 4 Temple Row West in the centre of Birmingham, England, opposite St Philip's Cathedral. The listed building was designed as a library but owes its present name to its use by the Birmingham Joint Stock Bank.

== History ==
The present day theatre and pub is housed in a Grade II listed building built as a library by architect J. A. Chatwin in 1862. The building was acquired by the Birmingham Joint Stock Bank, established in 1861. The bank had four branches within the city; the oldest one, here in Temple Row, was opened for business in 1862. The Joint Stock Company amalgamated with Lloyds Bank in 1889. The building was then used as a branch of Lloyds Bank. It was converted into a pub in 1997. The theatre opened in 2006 with the £350,000 cost being provided by the owners Fuller, Smith & Turner. The design of the theatre was important and an ex theatre manager was used as a consultant during the construction. This consultant was the first manager of the pub and theatre.

== Description ==
The theatre seats 95 in a flexible arrangement, and is located on the second floor of the building. The venue hosts mostly theatre performances. It has a resident musical theatre company (The Old Joint Stock Musical Theatre Company, aka OJSMTC). The venue programme has also included music, comedy and dance.

The theatre includes full dressing and green room facilities, a box office and a theatre bar for interval drinks, as well as a demountable stage and seating that allows each production or hire to inhabit the space to its best potential.

The theatre attracts companies and artists from across the region and nationally, including Kerry Ellis, Mrs Barbara Nice, Stewart Lee, Reginald D Hunter, Jim Jefferies and Tom Allen. The theatre also hosts corporate evenings and offers casino, comedy, wedding receptions etc.

== See also ==
- The Spread Eagle Theatre, the Old Joint Stock Theatre's sister venue in Croydon
