= Leo Butler =

British playwright (born 1974)

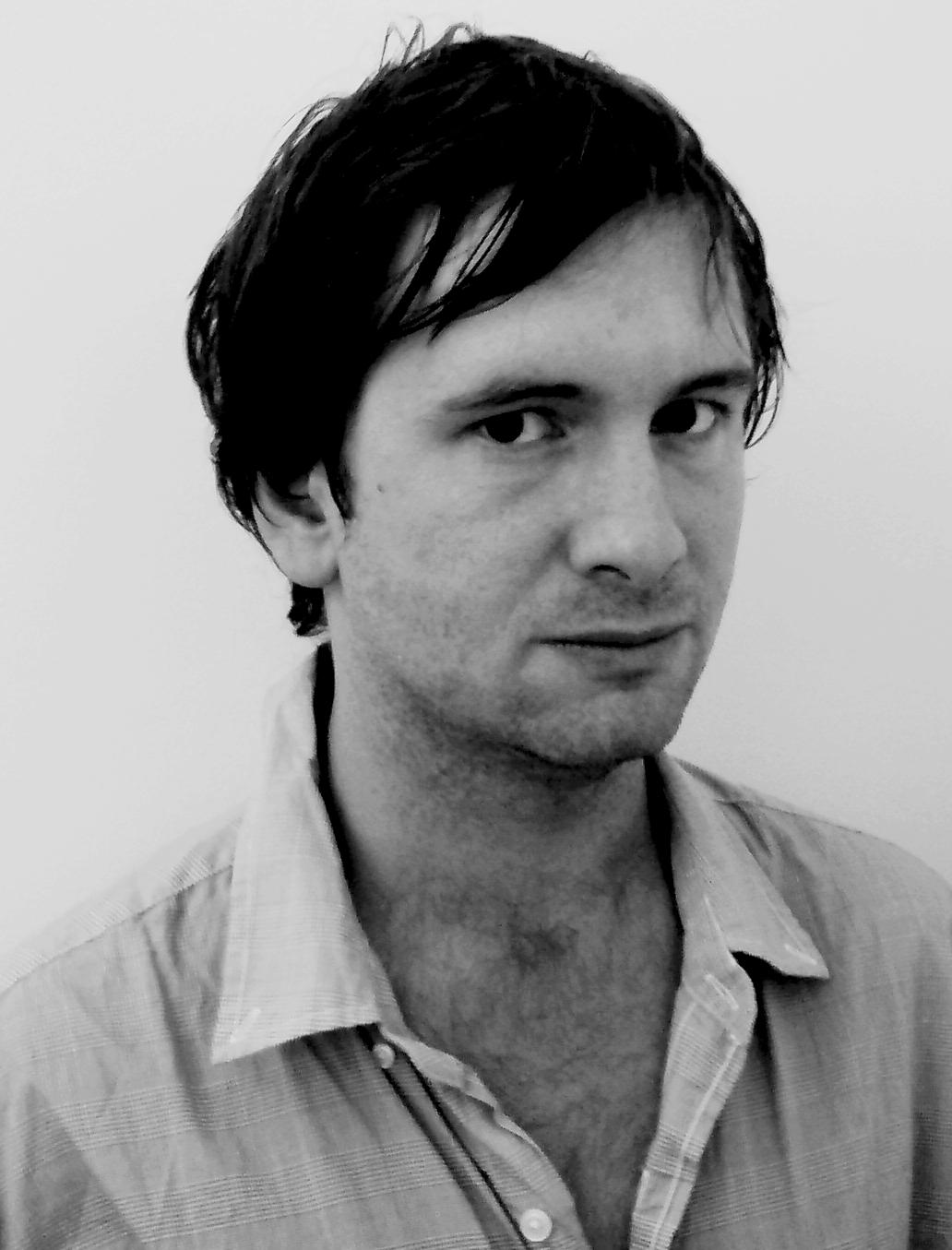
- Born: 1974 (age 51–52); Sheffield, England
- Education: Rose Bruford College
- Occupations: Playwright, Screenwriter
- Writing career
- Notable works: Redundant (2001); Lucky Dog (2004); Boy (play) (2016)

Leo Butler (born 1974 in Sheffield) is a British playwright. His plays have been staged, among others, by the Royal Court, the Royal Shakespeare Company and the Almeida Theatre. His plays have been published by Bloomsbury A & C Black. His 2001 play Redundant won the George Devine Award. Between 2005 and 2014 he was Playwriting Tutor for the Royal Court Young Writers Programme.

== Plays ==
- Made of Stone (2000) premiered as part of the Young Writers' Festival at Royal Court Theatre, directed by Deborah Bruce
- Redundant (2001) premiered at Royal Court Theatre, directed by Dominic Cooke
- Devotion (2002) produced by Theatre Centre premiered at Redbridge Drama Centre, directed by Liam Steel
- Lucky Dog (2004) premiered at Royal Court Theatre, directed by James Macdonald
- The Early Bird (2006) premiered at Queen's Theatre in the Belfast Festival, directed by Rachel O'Riordan
- Heroes (2007) premiered by touring with the National Theatre, directed by Samantha Potter
- Airbag (2007) a collaboration with Nigerian choreographer Anthony Odey, premiered as a Rough Cut at the Royal Court Theatre
- I'll Be The Devil (2008) produced by the Royal Shakespeare Company, premiered at Tricycle Theatre, directed by Ramin Gray
- Faces in the Crowd (2008) premiered at Royal Court Theatre, directed by Clare Lizzimore
- Juicy Fruits (2011) produced by Paines Plough, premiered at Oran Mor, directed by George Perrin
- Alison! : A Rock Opera (2012) co-written with Dan Persad premiered at King's Head Theatre, directed by Nick Bagnall
- Could You Please Close The Door Please? (2012) premiered at Berlin Schaubuhne as part of the Festival of International Drama.
- Sixty-Nine (2012) premiered at The Pleasance Courtyard, Edinburgh Festival Fringe, directed by Donnacadh O'Briain
- Do It! (2013) premiered at Royal Court Theatre Open Court Season, directed by Ned Bennett.
- Boy (2016) premiered at the Almeida Theatre, directed by Sacha Wares
- Decades (2016) premiered at the Ovalhouse theatre, produced by the BRIT School, directed by Eva Sampson.
- Woyzeck (2018) premiered at Birmingham Repertory Theatre, an adaptation of Georg Buchner's original play, directed by Roxana Silbert.
- All You Need is LSD (2018) premiered at Birmingham Repertory Theatre, co-produced with Told by an Idiot theatre company, directed by Paul Hunter and Stephen Harper.
- Meet Mo (2020) produced online by Theatre Royal Stratford East, a short musical composed by Leo Butler, directed by Eva Sampson.
- Cinderella (2022) produced by Theatre Royal Stratford East book and lyrics by Leo Butler, music and lyrics by Robert Hyman, directed by Eva Sampson.
- Innocent Creatures (2023) produced by National Theatre Connections.
- Living (2026) produced by Sheffield Theatres, directed by Abigail Graham.

== Film ==
- Self Made (2011 feature) co-written with Gillian Wearing, UK Film Council/Northern Film & Media, premiered at the London Film Festival 2011.

== Television ==
- Jerusalem the Golden (2002) single drama produced by BBC Four/Fictionlab, directed by Louis Caulfield, starring Rudolph Walker and Eddie Marsan.

== Books ==
- Notes From a Working-Class Playwright (2025) Published by Bloomsbury/Methuen Drama. Award-winning British playwright, Leo Butler looks back over 25 of writing for the stage and his extensive experience teaching and mentoring emerging playwrights through the Royal Court Young Writers' Programme.

== Music ==
- Alison! A Rock Opera (2012) a rock opera, written by Leo Butler and Dan Persad.
- The Collective Psychosis of the 21st Century (2017) an album of songs written & performed by Leo Butler and Dan Persad
