= On the Rocks (2008 play) =

British Play

- Original language: English
- Written by: Amy Rosenthal

Premiere
- Date: 1 July 2008
- Place: Hampstead Theatre, London
- Directed by: Clare Lizzimore

On the Rocks is a 2008 play written by Amy Rosenthal and directed by Clare Lizzimore about real events surrounding novelist, short story writer, poet and playwright D. H. Lawrence in the tiny village of Zennor in Cornwall in 1916 in the middle of World War I. It played at the Hampstead Theatre in London from 1 to 26 July 2008. It was shortlisted for the Susan Smith Blackburn Prize in 2009.

== Abstract ==
D. H. Lawrence and his wife Frieda are living a shaky relationship with the overpowering Frieda missing her children, whom she abandoned for the writer, and fighting with Lawrence. The local coastguards, also suspect that Frieda, a cousin of Manfred von Richthofen, the Red Baron air ace, is a German spy and is sending signals from the cliffs to U-boats in the channel. In these turbulent times, the Lawrences invite their best, and by now almost only remaining friends, the critic and editor John Middleton Murry and the short-story writer Katherine Mansfield to come and join them in the cottage. For Lawrence, this was a step on the road to his ideal of Rananim – a utopia where one could be happy with a group of friends. As things develop, Lawrence and Frieda engage in violent fights followed by love-making sessions on the floor. Lawrence suggests that Murry becomes his blood brother, while Mansfield has writer's block, a situation Rosenthal passed through for six years before writing this play. Mansfield, after an enforced intimacy with Frieda, puts an end to the social experiment, leaving Lawrence with a permanent sense of betrayal.

== Cast ==
- Ed Stoppard as DH Lawrence
- Tracy-Ann Oberman as Frieda Lawrence, D.H. Lawrence's wife
- Nick Caldecott as John Middleton Murry
- Charlotte Emmerson as Katherine Mansfield

== Personnel ==
- Director: Clare Lizzimore
- Writer: Amy Rosenthal
- Designer: Paul Burgess
- Lighting designer: Jon Clark
- Sound designer: Edward Lewis
