= Cat and Mouse (Sheep) =

Satirical theatre play of British politics and society

Cat And Mouse (Sheep)
- Written by: Gregory Motton
- Genre: Satire

Premiere
- Date premiered: 23 April 1995
- Place premiered: Odéon-Théâtre de l'Europe, Paris

Cat and Mouse (Sheep) is a 1995 theatre play by British playwright Gregory Motton. It satirises both the left and right in British society. It was premiered at the Odéon-Théâtre de l'Europe, Paris and then shown briefly in Britain at the Gate Theatre.It has subsequently only been performed outside Britain. It is published by Oberon Books. In the play, Conservative, capitalist and contemporary left wing politics are merged and discredited, identified as middle-class in their nature and origin and hostile to working class interests.

The play's emphasis on working class interests as being distinct from left wing politics as defined by the middle classes, a phenomenon now broadly discussed and to some degree acknowledged including within the Labour Party, was strongly at odds with opinion amongst British theatre practitioners at a time when left wing consensus centred around the emerging middle class leadership of the Labour Party whose success was to dominate the political scene for the next decade. Cat and Mouse (Sheep) marked the end of Motton's initial popularity with British theatres; The play was not accepted by any theatre managements when it was written in 1992, and has never been produced in Britain. Until that time Motton's major plays had been produced at either the Royal Court or Riverside Studios, Haymarket Theatre, Leicester, within eighteen months of being written. Cat and Mouse (Sheep) had to wait four years before being seen in Britain for six performances in a foreign production.

== First Production ==
Cat and Mouse (Sheep) was directed at the Théâtre De L'Europe à L'Odeon, Paris by Gregory Motton and Ramin Gray with actors Kevin McMonagle, Tony Rohr, Penelope Dimond and Patrick Bridgeman, in English. It was later directed by the same directors with a French cast at the Théâtre de Gennevilliers, Paris, run by the Marxist director Bernard Sobel. The same Odeon production was later taken to the Gate Theatre for six performances Notting Hill, Kevin McMonagle was not available for these performances and the part of Gengis was played by actress Rudi Davies.

== Context and Significance ==
Cat and Mouse (Sheep) is notable for its 'plague on both your houses' stance at a time when, in literary and arts organisations in general and the British theatre establishment in particular, a conventional, by then middle class, version of left-wingism was more or less taken for granted and expressed though the choices made by the theatre and other managements Motton's new work was now as unpopular with managements as it had previously been with critics alike and the play was only able to be shown in Britain as part of a programme of "foreign" plays in a production financed by French money. Motton's was an early and isolated dissident voice, but one of limited effectiveness due to his marginalisation, in the nascent debate within the left over the direction of the movement. Cat and Mouse (Sheep) was written while the middle class leadership established control of the Labour Party and five years before it formed the centre-left government under Tony Blair of 1997, and precedes by a decade and a half the last stage of the conflict within Labour over control and direction of the movement, surrounding the leadership of Jeremy Corbyn, which Motton, along with others, was later to describe in articles as the end of the same process.

Cat and Mouse (Sheep) was the first of four satires by that author using the same characters. The others are Gengis Amongst The Pygmies, A Holiday In The Sun and The Rape Of Europe

The play and the subsequent three plays in the series, are useful as a register of opinion that was left wing but nevertheless unpopular with the left wing establishment, concentrating as those plays did on the plight of the lowest stratas of the poor, both in Britain and abroad, and eschewing, or even ridiculing the more popular issues of gender and race politics that appealed to middle class voters, – and to theatre audiences and managements. The plays also tended to adopt an accusing tone towards middle class consumers especially, charging them with hypocrisy and complicity in the exploitation of cheap labour in the Far East. These plays have never been produced in Britain despite some prominent French Productions.

The play marks Motton's open opposition to the middle class controlled left, and a switch from his previous a-political lyricism in plays such as Looking At You (revived)Again to political satire. This was followed by a further move to straight polemics in works such as Helping Themselves-The Left Wing Middle Classes In Theatre And The Arts and A Working Class Alternative To Labour. The latter book is now in the House of Commons Library. These books and the articles that follow them give a clarification of a distinctly working class position in terms of left-wing advocacy and put the case for an independent political movement to represent work class interests.

== Characters and plot ==
The play introduces the character of Genghis Khan, an immigrant shopkeeper, an anti-hero with all the faults and attributes of a petty tyrant and a common man, constantly trying to gratify his lusts and greed, but whose very baseness is exceeded by the rapacity and ability to distort, of both capitalists and middle class leftwingers, who, to his annoyance and indignation, 'seem to have got there first'.

A British-Pakistani, shopkeeper, Gengis lives with his Irish uncle, 'a rather unpleasant middle aged man keen to follow every latest trend' and his English, prudish, greedy and lascivious maiden aunt. When he begins a price war with his neighbour his wife Indira immediately leaves him, but he ends up the despotic ruler of the whole country. He receives advice from his manipulative Aunty and Uncle and his misadventures are chronicled by obsequious and terrified poet, Dickwitts. Gengis' policies are parodies of mixtures of the worst excess of left and right, of capitalism and political correctness, inflicted with relish on a populace already suffering poverty, destitution and ignorance. His wife returns 'at the head of a large force' to defeat him and the play ends with Gengis on a chair facing the hangman's noose (the very noose that becomes a fashion accessory in the next of the series Gengis Amongst The Pygmies).

== Reception ==
Critical reception in Britain was mixed, in keeping with the reception of previous plays, some finding it incomprehensible. Michael Billington for The Guardian, complained of a 'scattergun technique' and called Motton 'an absurdist with Marxist tendencies' more suited to European audiences than to British. Roger Foss for What's On however wrote:

Its surely a sign of just how predictably parochial and whimpish British drama has become when Gregory Motton has to go to Paris to get this brilliant state of the nation play premiered. Almost totally ignored by our own theatrical establishment, Motton is much appreciated in Europe and is presently Britain's most performed playwright in France. But thanks to the Gate's inaugural Biennale season Londoners at least have a chance to hear a unique voice that totally defies any neat categorisation. Satirical, witty and mind boggling at just about every conceivable level, this all adds to a unique theatrical experience.Theatregoing can never be quite the same after this.

favourably overestimating its impact.

The Independent perhaps summarised the disorientation felt by most audiences when it said "Motton is in characteristically iconoclastic, strident form. You enjoy feelings of shock, curiosity, amazed bursts of hilarity, irritation, sudden clarity, confusion, more amusement. When the furious and adamantine block of political satire rises up, iceberg-like, from the sea of wilfully obscure wordplay, it is brilliant" but complained of some "monotony unrelieved by progression or tension" The Oldie said it was "Pinter in reverse, Joe Orton accelerated, T.S.Eliot brought up to date" while Harold Pinter himself wrote a letter to the author saying that he had enjoyed the play and wished him "more power to your elbow".

== Criticisms ==
Like much of Motton's writing for the theatre Cat and Mouse (Sheep) antagonised and bewildered theatre managements and critics, as well as some audiences. The work comes from a position already reached by the author and makes no concessions to any need to lead the audience to share his outlook. Instead it deliberately seeks to confront and embarrass the audience by tricking them into thinking they are being invited to agree with ideas that are then quickly discredited and ridiculed. This process is what gives the play its title The result, while startling and amusing when it isn't plainly confusing, does little to win over audiences. The resulting clash engenders a hostility that has effectively silenced the very views the author proposes to advance. The play's failure to communicate successfully remains a glaring and fatal fault. Its failure seems to be built-in. Also, he could have avoided the politically prescriptive and formally conservative nature of British theatre by writing television satire or novels.
