= Boy (play) =

Play

- Written by: Leo Butler
- Original language: English

Premiere
- Date premiered: 2016
- Place premiered: Almeida Theatre in London

Boy by Leo Butler is a play which premiered at the Almeida Theatre in 2016. It was directed by Sacha Wares, and featured Frankie Fox in the lead role.

== Reviews ==
The play received excellent reviews with Paul Taylor from The Independent stating that the play was "an unforgettable 80 minutes" while Mark Shenton writing for London Theatre stated "I was bowled over and knocked sideways by Boy. It proves to be stunningly articulate about an inarticulate teenager. As he is buffeted, jostled, excluded and intimated on all sides, it speaks profoundly of London today."

Fiona Mountford of The Evening Standard praised lead actor, Frankie Fox, writing "Fox’s haunted eyes and subtly shifting speech patterns tell us more than the deliberate impersonality of Leo Butler’s crafty script, with its overlapping dialogues. Liam is simply a face in the crowd, a victim of the new austerity era. He could be — is — one of countless young people today.".

Jane Schilling from The Daily Telegraph also commended the play, writing that "the influence of Beckett is clearly visible in Butler’s new play, in which aimlessness is distilled with alchemical concentration into poetry", while praising the "director/designer team of Sacha Wares and Miriam Buether who bring to this bleak parable of alienation a staging of beautiful complexity."

Reviewing the play for The Financial Times, Sarah Hemming described the production as "Quiet, undemonstrative and compassionate, this is a devastating portrait of life for those young people at the bottom of the pile in contemporary Britain. Butler’s play appears simple but is in fact very skilful. He essentially dramatises an experience that is fundamentally antithetical to dramatic narrative. There’s no significant action, no progress, no meaningful dialogue or conflict. And he gives voice to a boy whose largest problem is his inarticulacy."

Phillip Fisher writing for The British Theatre Guide declared that Boy "might well be the best new play that you see in 2016. Leo Butler has written an immersive piece that can best be conveyed by asking readers to imagine that James Joyce's Ulysses has been updated to South London today in an effort to let them feel the city's heartbeat, a symbol that the soundscape hammers home throughout the 75-minute running time."

Victoria Sadler of The Huffington Post described the play as "painfully beautiful. An unequivocally brave production," and "a searing indictment of what our society has become, and what trials we force those on the margins to overcome."

Susannah Clapp, writing for The Observer declared that "London in 2016 has made it on to the stage. Vitally. The fleeting scenes that make up Boy might have blown in like scrap paper from the pavements outside the Almeida. Returning outside, you look and hear differently."

Writing for Time Out, the reviewer Andrzej Lukowski commented that "anyone familiar with the name Sacha Wares will know all her direction is fancy. Though relentlessly visually stimulating, it also feel like an installation that mimics the enervating monotony of trying to occupy yourself on the streets all day. It’s not a play to make you feel good about the world. But it’s an audacious piece of theatre-making that’s does its bit through sheer depth of empathy."

The Economist also wrote that the production "aims for universals; it is a play about the Liam-types who haunt every city—the worldwide problem of the lost young man. Its language certainly translates. Mr Butler, with his gift both for language and loaded silences, gets as close as anyone has to the malaise and disenchantment of modern youth."
