= Boston Marriage (play) =

1999 play by David Mamet

- Original language: English
- Written by: David Mamet
- Characters: Anna; Claire; Catherine
- Genre: Comedy

Premiere
- Date: June 16, 1999
- Place: American Repertory Theater

Boston Marriage is a 1999 American play by American playwright David Mamet. The play concerns two women at the turn of the 20th century who are in a Boston marriage, a relationship between two women that may involve both physical and emotional intimacy. After widespread belief that Mamet could only write for men, the playwright released this play, which centers exclusively on women.

== Synopsis ==
Anna and Claire argue over Claire's newfound "Love" while Anna's Scottish maid, Catherine, is brought to tears by her employer's harsh verbal rebukes. Things get tense as Anna, a mistress to a wealthy gentleman, tries to talk Claire out of her profession of love for another: a young woman. Claire, on the other hand, has already made plans with her young love to meet at Anna's house in the hopes that she will be able to persuade her new love to engage in a "vile assignation." Things go awry, however, when the girl arrives and recognizes that an emerald necklace that Anna is wearing belongs to her mother.

The plot line focuses on whether Anna and Claire will be able to find a way to hold on to both the girl and her wealthy but unfaithful father. The play is delivered through quick, witty Victorian-era dialogue, mixed with double entendres and vernacular expressions, to explore the relationship between the two women and their maid. Through humor and nuance, the play explores the negotiation, conflict, compromise, and reconciliation that arise in their relationship.

== Production history ==
Boston Marriage was originally produced by the American Repertory Theater (Robert Brustein, Artistic Director; Robert J. Orchard, Managing Director) at the Hasty Pudding Theatre in Cambridge, Massachusetts on June 4, 1999. It was directed by David Mamet; the set design was by Sharon Kaitz and J. Michael Griggs; the lighting design was by John Ambrosone; and the costume design was by Harriet Voyt. The cast included Rebecca Pidgeon (Claire), Felicity Huffman (Anna), and Mary McCann (Catherine).

It was performed in London at the Donmar Warehouse from March 8 until April 14, 2001. Directed by Phyllida Lloyd, it featured Zoë Wanamaker (Anna), Anna Chancellor (Claire), and Lyndsey Marshal. It moved to the West End at the New Ambassadors Theatre, where it ran from November 28, 2001 until February 16, 2002.

Boston Marriage was first performed in Melbourne, Australia, in 2007 produced by independent theatre company Hoy Polloy. It was directed by Hoy Polloy Artistic Director Wayne Pearn and featured Helen Hopkins, Corinne Davies, and Eleanor Wilson.

Boston Marriage ran Off-Broadway at The Public Theater from November 5, 2002 through December 22, 2002. It was directed by Karen Kohlhaas and starred Kate Burton as Anna, Martha Plimpton as Claire and Arden Myrin.

The play was performed in Lima, Peru in early 2007 under the direction of theatre director and actor Alberto Ísola.

The play was again performed in Melbourne by the Melbourne Theatre Company through June 2010. Pamela Rabe, Margaret Mills, and Sara Gleeson starred, directed by Aidan Fennessy. It returned to the Boston area in September 2010, as presented at the New Repertory Theater. As part of the Dublin Theatre Festival 2010, the Gate Theatre, Dublin, Ireland staged Boston Marriage as part of its "BMP" programme; celebrating the links between Samuel Beckett, Harold Pinter and Mamet. The play ran on 29 September and 2 October 2010.

== Lesbian themes ==
Boston Marriage is one of the few plays written by a male playwright that exclusively includes lesbian characters. The play takes on an anti-patriarchal stance. Anna does not show any genuine interest in the man she is involved with. At the end of the play, Anna’s male love interest leaves her for his wife and wants her to return the emerald jewel he gave her. This gives Claire fiscal power over Anna which contrasts the Victorian tradition of men owning their wives’ money.

The plot of Boston Marriage does not include the common stereotypes of women being married to a man, financially dependent on their husbands, and spending most of their time taking care of their children.

Lesbian themes in theatre are a direct response to America’s anti-LGBTQ+ and anti-theatrical attitudes in its history. “Lesbian” was not a word used in Western society until the nineteenth century. The roles of lesbian and gay characters in theatre were considered to be two separate themes until the latter half of the twentieth century. There is not as much public interest in plays written exclusively about lesbian characters as there is in plays with exclusively gay characters. Similarly to early plays that included gay characters, plays including lesbians traditionally ended in violence and death. Plays with exclusively lesbian characters written by lesbian playwrights targeted all-female audiences.

More lesbian plays were written in the 1960s and 1970s largely due to the feminist movement. Lack of public interest led to a decrease in the number of lesbian plays written and performed until the late 1990s when Boston Marriage was written and the early twenty-first century.

LGBTQ+ theatre is dominated by white gay men. David Mamet is one of the few heterosexual male playwrights to write about a play with exclusively lesbian characters.

Boston Marriage is the only play David Mamet wrote that only includes lesbian characters.
