= Ramin Gray =

British theatre director

Ramin Gray is a British theatre director.

== Early life ==
Born in London, Ramin Gray grew up in Oxford, Tehran, New York, and Paris, before graduating from Christ Church, Oxford with a BA (Hons, 2:1) in Oriental Studies (Persian and Arabic) in 1987.

== Career ==
Gray began directing professionally in 1988 with a production of John Marston's The Malcontent at the Latchmere Theatre in London. In 1990 he was awarded a Regional Theatre Young Director Scheme bursary to Liverpool Playhouse where he directed Wedekind's Spring Awakening and Arthur Miller's A View from the Bridge.

He re-opened the Liverpool Playhouse Studio as a dedicated space for new plays from 1992–95, where he directed Gregory Motton's A Message for the Broken-Hearted. In Paris at Odéon Théâtre National de l'Europe and Théâtre National de Gennevilliers he directed Cat And Mouse (Sheep) by Gregory Motton. At London's Gate Theatre he directed Jon Fosse's The Child and Paul Godfrey's The Invisible Woman.

From 2000–09 Gray was at the Royal Court Theatre, first as International Associate (2000–05), then as Associate Director (2005–09) where he directed over fifteen world or British premieres. In the Theatre Upstairs these included: Push Up by Roland Schimmelpfennig, Terrorism by the Presnyakov Brothers, Ladybird by Vassily Sigarev, Way To Heaven by Juan Mayorga, Woman and Scarecrow by Marina Carr, Just a Bloke by David Watson, and Scenes from the Back of Beyond by Meredith Oakes.

In the Theatre Downstairs he directed Simon Stephens' Motortown, Max Frisch's The Arsonists, Martin Crimp's Advice to Iraqi Women, two plays by Marius von Mayenburg, The Ugly One, and The Stone, and Over There by Mark Ravenhill (also Schaubűhne, Berlin). Gray's freelance theatre work in the UK includes two plays for the Royal Shakespeare Company, David Greig's The American Pilot and Leo Butler's I'll Be The Devil, and Alistair Beaton's King of Hearts, which he co-directed with Max Stafford-Clark for Hampstead Theatre and Out of Joint.

Internationally, Gray has directed two plays by Simon Stephens, the German language premiere of Harper Regan at the Salzburg Festival in a co-production with the Schauspielhaus Hamburg and On The Shore of the Wide World at Volkstheater Wien (Karl-Skraup Prize). His 2010 Viennese production of Dennis Kelly's Orphans was nominated for the Nestroy Prize. His Russian production of The Ugly One won Best Director at the Textura Festival, Perm in 2010.

From 2011 to 2018 Gray was Artistic Director of ATC Theatre for whom he directed The Golden Dragon by Roland Schimmelpfennig, which saw 110 performances worldwide including India and Northern Iraq, the first major revival of Crave by Sarah Kane and a new Russian play, Illusions by Ivan Vyrypaev, and the British premiere of Marius von Mayenburg's Martyr.

Gray commissioned and directed David Greig's The Events, with music by John Browne, which was voted by critics in The Guardian as the 'Best Play of 2013'. Co-produced with the Young Vic, Schauspielhaus Wien and Brageteatret Norway, Gray also directed the Norwegian and Austrian productions of The Events.

In 2016/7 Gray's critically acclaimed production of Aeschylus' The Suppliant Women opened at the Royal Lyceum in Edinburgh and toured the UK, Ireland and Hong Kong.

Gray directed the British premiere of Roland Schimmelpfennig's Winter Solstice at the Orange Tree in January 2016.

In 2009 Gray directed Benjamin Britten's Death in Venice at the Hamburgische Staatsoper, conducted by Simone Young. The production then transferred to Theater an der Wien, conducted by Donald Runnicles. At Hamburg he also directed the European premiere of Brett Dean's Bliss and, in 2015, the world premiere of Beat Furrer's La Bianca Notte. For the Royal Opera House, he directed the British premiere of Gerald Barry's The Importance of Being Earnest in 2013. In 2016 the production was revived at the Barbican Centre and Lincoln Center, New York.
