= Faces in the Crowd (play) =

2008 play by Leo Butler

- poster for Faces in the Crowd
- Original language: English
- Written by: Leo Butler
- Characters: 1 male and 1 female

Premiere
- Date: 2008
- Place: Royal Court Theatre, London

Faces in the Crowd by Leo Butler was first performed at the Royal Court theatre in London in 2008. The original cast had Amanda Drew and Con O'Neill directed by Clare Lizzimore. It has been called a 'credit-crunch generation Who's Afraid of Virginia Woolf?.

It was one of the first pieces of theatre to examine the credit crunch and focused on an estranged husband and wife. The original performance was particularly notable for the staging where the play was performed in the round and the audience sat above the flat in which the play was set and looked down on the action.

== Overview ==
Dave and Joanna were married but he left their Sheffield flat under too much pressure. The action starts 10 years later when Joanna comes to visit him wanting a baby, they fight and argue viciously and sleep together as secrets come out about their past.

== Reviews ==
Lyn Gardner of The Guardian described the play as "awash with alcohol, vitriol and violence" and "a Who's Afraid of Virginia Woolf? for the credit-crunch generation." She also praised "the most full-frontally brave performances in London from Con O'Neill and Amanda Drew as the toxic ex-partners". She went on to say that "there are times when it is so raw and bloody, you want to avert your gaze".

Fiona Mountford of the Evening Standard described it as "the nearest theatre has yet come to a credit crunch play", commenting that "Butler worries at some weighty themes in his spare script, covering not only our have-now-pay-later culture but also the failure of feminist rhetoric when countered with the brutal facts of female biology." She congratulated it as "a thrillingly no-holds-barred production, powered by commendably raw performances from Drew and O’Neill."

Dominic Cavendish of The Daily Telegraph wrote that "Butler's outstanding new play - his best yet - catches the mood of the moment in its raw and devastating account of a couple who got swept along on a tide of easy credit, only to end up dashed against a northern rock of debt." Praising the "intensely pitiful scene that can shift in the space of a phrase from the bleakly funny to the unbearably excruciating", the reviewer went on to say that "I can't think of a recent play that catches so acutely the way that, while it may be tough up North, it can be grim down South too. And with incredible deftness, Butler ponders the harsh predicament of women who flounder when they hit the glass ceiling of reproductive reality. This is a timely, savagely brilliant theatrical epitaph for the New Labour decade of shattered hopes and dreams turned sour."
