= Clare Lizzimore =

British theatre director and writer (born 1980)

Clare Lizzimore (born 1980) is a British theatre director and writer. Her production of Bull by Mike Bartlett, won 'Outstanding Achievement in an Affiliate Theatre' at the 2015 Olivier Awards. Lizzimore has been resident director at the Citizens Theatre, Glasgow, and staff director at the Royal National Theatre.

== Background ==
Lizzimore was born in Watford. She studied Film and Drama at Reading University, and also gained an MA in Advanced Theatre practice at The Central School of Speech and Drama. She became a professional Theatre director in 2005 when she left the BBC to produce Duncan Macmillan’s 'The Most Humane Way to Kill a Lobster'.

== Career highlights ==
Lizzimore won the 2005 Channel 4 Directors Award (also known as the Regional Theatre Young Director Scheme) and became resident director at The Glasgow Citizens Theatre where her production of Tom Fool by Franz Xaver Kroetz was nominated for four CATS Awards, for Best director, Best Male performance, Best Female performance, and Best Design. It transferred to the Bush Theatre in 2007. In 2008 Lizzimore became the associate director at Out of Joint and co-directed The Mother by Mark Ravenhill, with Max-Stafford Clark, at The Royal Court theatre. She went on to win the Arts Foundation Theatre Directing Fellowship for Innovation in 2009. Lizzimore is well known for directing premiers of new writing including Jonah and Otto by Robert Holman at The Royal Exchange Manchester, Faces in The Crowd by Leo Butler at The Royal Court Theatre, One Day When We were Young by Nick Payne as part of the Paines Plough/Sheffield Roundabout Season and On the Rocks, a play written by Amy Rosenthal about the turbulent life of writer D.H. Lawrence.

Lizzimore is also a playwright, her first play Mint premiered at The Royal Court Theatre in 2013. A debut that was praised as 'cumulatively devastating' and 'worthy of Edward Bond'. Her radio play Missing in Action aired on BBC Radio 4 in 2014, and was play of the week. Lizzimore’s second play Animal premiered at The Studio Theatre in Washington D.C in 2015 and was nominated for The Charles MacArthur Award for Outstanding New Play or Musical. Her second radio play The Rage, aired in 2016 on BBC Radio 4, and was shortlisted for Best Single Drama at the BBC Audio Drama Awards 2017.

== Personal life ==
Lizzimore is married to writer Mike Bartlett.
