= The Earlybirds =

The Earlybirds were a hip hop band from New Zealand. Their debut album, Favourite Fears, was released on 23 August 2010 and entered the New Zealand album charts at number seven, spending three weeks on the chart.

== Discography ==
=== Studio albums ===
List of albums, with peak chart positions
Title	Album details	NZ chart
Favourite Fears	Released: 23 August 2010; Label: The Earlybirds/Warner; Format: CD, digital download	7

=== Singles ===
List of singles, showing year released and album name
Title	Year	Album
"Runaway"	2009	Favourite Fears
"I Killed the DJ"	2009	Favourite Fears
"I Can't Live Without You"	2010	Favourite Fears
"Low"	2010	Favourite Fears
"Truth"	2011	Favourite Fears

== Members- ==
Filip Kostovich – Vocals/Keyboards

Mike Cannon – Guitar

Jared Aisher – Bass

Sean Patterson – Drums

Kane ter Veer – Guitar/Backing Vocals
