= A Face in the Crowd =

A Face in the Crowd may refer to:

== Albums ==
- A Face In the Crowd (album), 2011, by Edo G
- Face in the Crowd, a 1999 album by Leon Russell

== Songs ==
- "A Face in the Crowd" (Michael Martin Murphey and Holly Dunn song) (1987)
- "A Face in the Crowd" (Tom Petty song) (1989)
- "(A) Face in the Crowd", a 1975 song by The Kinks from Soap Opera
- "Face in the Crowd", a 2023 song by Freya Ridings from Blood Orange
- "Face in the Crowd", a 1986 song by Little River Band from No Reins

== Other uses ==
- A Face in the Crowd (film), 1957, starring Andy Griffith and Patricia Neal
  - A Face in the Crowd (musical), based on the film
- A Face in the Crowd (novella), 2012, by Stephen King and Stewart O'Nan
- "A Face in the Crowd" (Between the Lines), a 1994 television episode
