= Game (play) =

2015 play

- Written by: Mike Bartlett
- Genre: Drama
- Setting: A flat in England

Premiere
- Date premiered: 2015

Game is a 2015 dramatic play written by Mike Bartlett.

Game premiered at the Almeida Theatre in London, England.

== Plot ==
A voyeuristic look at a couple's relationship set in a reality television setting.

== Reception ==
The Observer theatre critic Kate Kellaway wrote, "Game is more a concept than a conventional play, in which multitalented and prolific playwright Mike Bartlett explores the numb thrills of video-game violence and the relationship between virtual assassinations and the extermination of real people in an ingeniously executed evening, directed with sangfroid by Sacha Wares."
