= The Early Bird (play) =

Play written by Leo Butler

Early Bird
- Written by: Leo Butler
- Characters: 1 male and 1 female

Premiere
- Date: 2006; Queen's Theatre in Ireland

The Early Bird by Leo Butler was first produced at the Queen's Theatre in the Belfast Festival in Ireland in 2006 and was directed by Rachel O'Riordan.

The play is deliberately left without a setting or much stage directions to reflect the mindset of the two characters Debbie and Jack whose daughter disappears. The dialogue moves between surreal hyper-reality and plain naturalism jumping between time.

The title comes from the saying the early bird catches the worm which Debbie repeatedly told their daughter in the mornings before she went to school which was the last time either parent saw her last.

The play was later revived to great acclaim in 2010 at the Finborough Theatre, directed by Donnacadh O'Briain and starring Catherine Cusack and Alex Palmer, followed by a run at the Project Arts Centre, Dublin.

== Reviews ==
Michael Billington of The Guardian said (of the 2010 production) that "though a bit too cryptic for its own good, what really makes the play unnerving is the lingering suggestion that Kimberley's disappearance may be the consequence, as well as the source, of parental trauma." While Skye Crawford of Fringe Review claimed that "Butler’s intrinsic understanding of humanity, warts and all, cements his place as one of the 21st Century’s great playwrights", commenting that the play "speaks loudly and clearly about this delicate subject matter experienced by so many parents world wide."

Kate Bassett of The Independent praised the "electrifying" show, while commenting that "there are only faint echoes of Jamie Bulger and Madeleine McCann", instead suggesting that "The Early Bird bears some resemblance to Ian McEwan's The Child in Time." Susan Conley of Irish Theatre Magazine said of the 2010 Dublin production that "given such high profile cases as have concerned Madaleine McCann and the Soham Two, we have found ourselves witness to the pain and frozen horror of men and women who have had their offspring robbed from their lives, and one can’t help but speculate about what happens behind closed doors. What do they talk about? Can they talk about anything but the event? Do they blame one another? Do they have sex? Is their relationship completely destroyed? Butler’s piece isn’t really interested in these questions, and gives us an artful, if distant, portrayal of a psyche of a couple rather than imagining their reality. This is not a kitchen sink play — it’s about the stuff in the drains."
