= David Lean Cinema =

Cinema within Croydon Clocktower in Croydon, London, England

Coordinates: 51.3721°N 0.0990°W

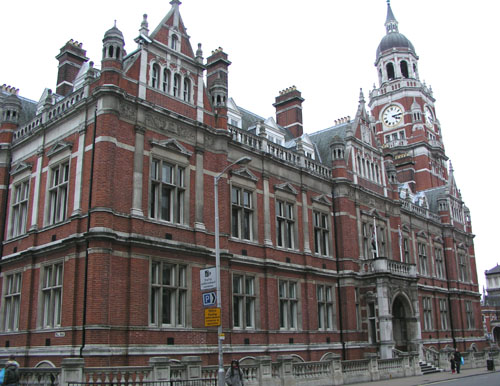
Croydon Town Hall, which houses the David Lean Cinema

The David Lean Cinema is a small cinema established in Croydon, London. It is accessed from the Croydon Clocktower arts complex on Katharine Street.

== History ==
The cinema was established in the 1990s, to honour the director David Lean, who was born in the town. It was formed as a small, intimate, art house-style cinema to showcase the best of British film and World cinema as well as classic re-releases and recent favourites. It was established in a part of the 19th century Town Hall which had previously been used as a local studies library.

It closed as a result of council funding cuts in 2011, although films continued to be shown under the David Lean banner at the Fairfield Halls and the Spread Eagle pub. It then was reopened as a result of a local campaign in 2014.
