= Fireface =

Fireface (original German title: Feuergesicht) is a play by Marius von Mayenburg, written in 1997 and first performed in 1998 at the Munich Kammerspiele. This play was the breakthrough of von Mayenburg as a new dramatist.

As well as two more performances in Germany (Kleist Theater in Frankfurt (Oder), Deutsches Schauspielhaus in Hamburg), Fireface has been performed all over the world, including the Royal Court Theatre in London and The Brick Theater in Brooklyn. It was also performed at the Sydney Festival in 2001 and during the Festival/Tokyo 09 autumn festival in March 2009.

The play is about the claustrophobic feelings of the new generation, their fear of growing up and being like their parents, and about pyromania.

Kurt and Olga are brother and sister in an incestuous relationship, living in a 'normal' family with their parents. Kurt is totally obsessed with fire. When Olga starts a relationship with another boy, Paul, Kurt's obsession begins to become dangerous. The parents don't want to see this danger and at the end they are killed by Kurt. When Olga finally chooses to live with Paul, Kurt burns himself.
