= Lucky Dog (play) =

Play written by Leo Butler

- Lucky Dog by Leo Butler
- Written by: Leo Butler
- Characters: 2 male and 1 female
- Original language: English

Premiere
- Date premiered: 2004
- Place premiered: Royal Court Theatre, London

Lucky Dog by Leo Butler is a play which premiered in the upstairs Jerwood Theatre of Royal Court in 2004. It was directed by James Macdonald, and featured Linda Bassett and Alan Williams in the lead roles.

Butler has said that he was inspired by the image of a woman turning into a dog and had the title and that image long before the play or narrative. He says that he had written several scenes involving that image and title before he found the Christmas setting and found he could write the play.

The play is split in half with the first part of the action being set a Christmas time in Sheffield and the second almost silent part abroad a year later. It centers on an older married couple Eddie and Sue and the bitterness and desperation that comes into their marriage once their son has left home. The central event to the play is where Sue acts like their dog snarling and growling at her husband.

Linda Bassett was awarded Best Actress for the play at the 2004 TMA Theatre Awards

== Reviews ==
Michael Billington in The Guardian praised the play, claiming to be "astonished by the 28-year-old Butler's profound understanding of marital solitude" and that "there are many noisier plays around but few capture so well the marital stated summed up by Beckett as “alone together, so much shared.” Adam Scott of The Independent described the play as a "provoking hinterland of unspoken trauma" and that "as you reassemble the fragments of the evening, Butler reveals himself as a writer of prescience and subtlety". While Kate Bassett of The Independent on Sunday reviewed the play as a "darkly funny and remarkably poignant portrait of a marriage. Butler's dialogue combines naturalistic chat, a musical sense of phrase and pause, and surreal episodes. The last act is an extraordinary coup de theatre, imbued with an almost heavenly sense of new-found tenderness and atonement".

Fiona Mountford of the Evening Standard called the play a "searing yet achingly poignant examination of family life turned sour" in which "the silences, laden with frustration and tension" are "just as powerful as the spoken word". Sarah Hemming of the Financial Times argued that "in a play so poignantly focused on loss and neglect, the unsaid, the unseen and the offstage play a huge part. You keep expecting something violent to happen, but it doesn’t as Butler’s portrayal of domestic horror is subtler than that. He shows us how cruel the simple withdrawal of love can be."
