= The Spread Eagle Theatre =

Coordinates: 51.372238°N 0.100064°W

Spreadeagle Theatre
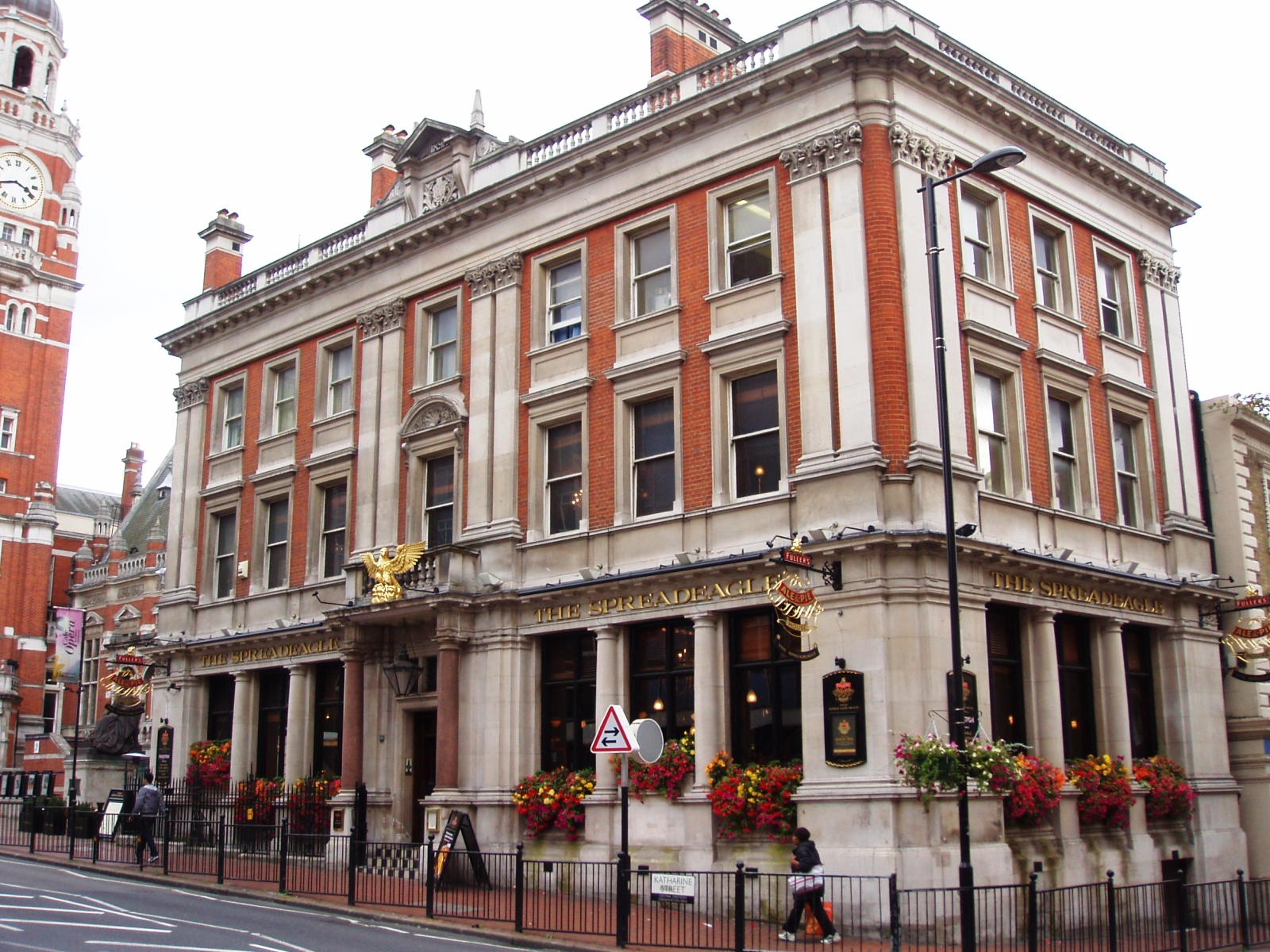
- Interactive map of Spreadeagle Theatre
- Address: 39-41 Katharine Street, Croydon CR0 1NX; London; England
- Capacity: 50

Construction
- Opened: 2013

The Spread Eagle Theatre is a 50-seat capacity studio theatre situated above the Spread Eagle pub in Croydon, England. Opening in October 2013 in response to the closure of the Warehouse Theatre in 2012, the pub transformed its upstairs function room into a theatre space.

The Spread Eagle Theatre supported and hosted the campaign to save the David Lean Cinema, the nearby arthouse cinema which later reopened. The theatre works closely with its sister venue, the Old Joint Stock Theatre in Birmingham, on co-productions with professional theatre companies. Both venues champion "big plays for small spaces", with an emphasis on supporting new writing.
