= Mike Bartlett (playwright) =

British playwright, screenwriter (born 1980)

- Born: Michael Bartlett; 7 October 1980 (age 46); Oxford, England
- Occupations: Playwright, screenwriter, theatre director
- Writing career
- Period: 2002–present

Michael Frederick Bartlett (born 7 October 1980) is an English playwright and screenwriter for film and TV series. His 2015 psychological thriller TV series, Doctor Foster, starring Suranne Jones, won the New Drama award from National Television Awards. Bartlett also won Best Writer from the Broadcast Press Guild Awards. A BBC TV Film of Bartlett's play King Charles III was broadcast in May 2017 and, while critically acclaimed, generated some controversy.

== Early life ==
Bartlett was born on 7 October 1980 in Oxford, England. He attended Abingdon School and then studied English and Theatre Studies at the University of Leeds.

== Career ==
=== Early work ===
Bartlett initially wanted to be a director, but decided to write plays after perceiving a shortage of plays about the present day. He gained a place on the Royal Court Theatre's young writers programme.

In July 2005, Bartlett took part in the Old Vic's New Voices 24 Hour Plays, in which plays had to be written and performed in 24 hours. This culminated in the performance of his play Comfort.

His radio play Not Talking was broadcast by the BBC on Saturday, 29 March 2007. The play explored the issues surrounding conscientious objection in the UK during World War II and also the problems of bullying within the armed forces. The play featured Richard Briers and June Whitfield.

Bartlett won the 2006 Tinniswood Award for Not Talking and the 2006 Imison Award for a drama by a writer new to radio on 18 October 2007.

In May 2007, while he held the position of "writer in residence" at the Royal Court Theatre, his play My Child premiered there.

His play, Artefacts, was performed at The Bush Theatre in London in 2008 before a national tour, produced by new writing specialists Nabokov. Also in 2008 he adapted his radio play Love Contract for the Royal Court Theatre.

In 2009, Bartlett's play Cock premiered at the Royal Court directed by James Macdonald. It won the 2010 Laurence Olivier Award for Outstanding Achievement in an Affiliate Theatre.

=== The National Theatre ===
In the summer of 2010, Bartlett's work was staged for the first time at the National Theatre. Earthquakes in London, directed by Rupert Goold, was described by Michael Billington in the Guardian as an "epic, expansive play about climate change, corporate corruption, fathers and children". Charles Spencer of the Daily Telegraph called it "the theatrical equivalent of a thrilling roller coaster ride", delivering "a rush of invention, humour and raw emotion".

In December 2010, Abingdon School and St Helen and St Katharine School staged the first amateur production of Earthquakes in London by Mike Bartlett, less than three months after the play concluded its run at the National Theatre. The schools were granted special permission to produce the play, as Bartlett is a former pupil of Abingdon School. Bartlett attended the final performance as guest of honour.

In February 2026, Abingdon School staged a 15th-anniversary revival of Earthquakes in London to celebrate the retirement of former Director of Drama Jeremy Taylor. Directed by Ben Phillips, this production was notable for its collaboration with the OX14 Learning Partnership (specifically featuring actors from John Mason and Larkmead schools), marking a shift from the school’s traditional theatrical partnership with St Helen and St Katharine.

Also in 2010, Bartlett's play Love, Love, Love was premiered in a touring production. In 2012 it has its London premiere at the Royal Court. Michael Coveney, writing for Whatsonstage.com, called it "one of the most ambitious, and most accomplished, domestic dramas in a long while".

In 2011, Bartlett returned to the National Theatre, this time on its largest stage (the Olivier), with 13, another contemporary epic. In a favourable review in the Guardian, Michael Billington explained, "Bartlett is saying that we live in a Britain where the old tribal loyalties are increasingly irrelevant. The real divide is between a popular protest movement, fed on Facebook and Twitter, that hungers for a change of direction, and an entrenched governmental system that clings precariously to the status quo." Ian Shuttleworth of the Financial Times noted that this was a play in which "sprawl wins out": "Both here and in Earthquakes Bartlett is groping towards some sense of a need to reconcile the worldly and the numinous. In this society, in the 21st century, that may be an admirable impulse for an individual, but in this case it is not proving a useful approach for a playwright."

In 2012, Bartlett adapted Chariots of Fire for the stage. It premiered at Hampstead Theatre before transferring to the West End. He also adapted the Euripides play Medea, in a touring production he directed himself; it starred Rachael Stirling in the title role.

=== Television and further plays ===
Later in 2012, ITV1 premiered the crime drama The Town starring Andrew Scott and Martin Clunes. Bartlett was subsequently nominated for a BAFTA award for best "Breakthrough Talent" in the TV Craft category in the 2013 awards in relation to The Town.

In October 2013, Bartlett won Best New Play at The National Theatre Awards for his play Bull, beating plays from both Alan Ayckbourn and Tom Wells.

In 2014, his play King Charles III premiered at the Almeida. It subsequently transferred to Wyndham's Theatre and in January 2015 won the Critics' Circle Award for Best Play of 2014. It premiered in Australia at the Sydney Theatre Company in April 2016.

In March 2015, his play Game premiered at the Almeida Theatre in London, England.

In April 2015, Bartlett's plays were awarded two additional Olivier Awards, his play King Charles III won Best New Play, and his play Bull, directed by Clare Lizzimore and produced by Supporting Wall at the Young Vic Theatre, won Outstanding Achievement in Affiliate Theatre.

Barlett's five-part television drama series Doctor Foster was broadcast in September and October 2015. The series achieved an average of 9.51 million viewers, and was one of the most viewed television drama series of the year. In addition to being a critical success, the drama won two awards at the 2016 National Television Awards in the categories of Best New Drama and Drama Performance for Suranne Jones. A second series commenced showing in September 2017.

In December 2015, Polly Hill, the Controller of BBC Drama Commissioning, announced a six 60-minute episode television series entitled Press that had been written by Bartlett. Commenting about the series, Bartlett said "From exposing political corruption to splashing on celebrity scandal, editors and journalists have enormous influence over us, yet recent events have shown there’s high-stakes and life-changing drama going on in the news organisations themselves. I’m hugely excited to be working with the BBC to make Press, a behind-the-scenes story about a group of diverse and troubled people who shape the stories and headlines we read every day". In October 2016, Hill, now the Head of Drama at ITV, announced that Bartlett would be returning to the channel for a new project, Trauma. Bartlett described the three-part series to be "about two fathers with very different lives, locked in conflict." The series will begin filming in early summer 2017.

In 2016, Bartlett was hired to write an episode of Doctor Who's tenth series. The episode, titled "Knock Knock", aired on 6 May 2017 and received generally positive reviews from critics.

On 10 May 2017, the BBC broadcast a TV adaptation of Bartlett's play, King Charles III, which generated controversy. The reviewer in The Daily Telegraph gave it five stars, calling it "pure televisual gelignite".

In 2023, he released a podcast in conjunction with a playwriting course he was offering at the Old Fire Station, Oxford. In it, he speaks about his process for writing and the role of theatre as art in modern times.

== Personal life ==
Bartlett lives in Oxfordshire and is married to theatre director Clare Lizzimore.

== Writing ==
=== Plays ===
- The Love at Last – 2002 (Gilded Balloon – Edinburgh Fringe)
- Swimming for Beginners – 2002 (The Workshop Theatre, Leeds)
- Why People Really Burn – 2003 (The Underbelly – Edinburgh Fringe)
- Silent Charities – July 2005 (Finborough Theatre)
- Comfort – 24-hour play – July 2005 (Old Vic Theatre)
- Stuff I Buried in a Small Town – March 2006 (Hampstead Theatre)
- My Child – May 2007 (Royal Court Theatre)
- Artefacts – commissioned and produced by Nabokov and first performed at The Bush Theatre, London – February / March 2008.
- Contractions – an adaptation of his radio play Love Contract at the Royal Court, 2008
- Cock – Royal Court – November 2009
- Earthquakes in London – National Theatre, 2010
- Love, Love, Love – Paines Plough, 2010
- 13 – National Theatre, 2011–2012/ Theatre Royal, Newcastle, 2016
- Chariots of Fire – Hampstead Theatre, London 9 May to 16 June 2012; Gielgud Theatre 23 June 2012 to 2 February 2013
- Bull – premiered at Crucible Studio Theatre, Sheffield 6 February 2013; transferred to 59E59 (New York City), 25 April 2013; transferred to Young Vic produced by Supporting Wall, 15 January 2014
- Medea – an adaptation of Euripides' Medea – touring production for Headlong, 27 September to 1 December
- An Intervention, 2014
- King Charles III, 2014, premiered at the Almeida Theatre, London, then transferred to the West End (Wyndham's Theatre), Broadway (Music Box Theatre) and Sydney Theatre Company in Australia (Roslyn Packer Theatre)
- Game, 2015 (Almeida Theatre, London)
- Wild, played at Hampstead Theatre, London 10 June to 16 July 2016
- Albion – 2017 (Almeida Theatre, London)
- Snowflake – 2018 (Old Fire Station, Oxford); 2019 (Kiln Theatre, London)
- Vassa – an adaptation of Maxim Gorky's Vassa Zheleznova– 2019 (Almeida Theatre, London)
- Mrs Delgado – 2021 (Old Fire Station, Oxford)
- The 47th – 2022 (The Old Vic, London)
- Scandaltown – 2022 (Lyric Hammersmith, London)
- Barn Dance - 2024 (The Theatre Chipping Norton)
- Unicorn – 2025 (The Garrick Theatre, London)

=== Television ===
- The Town – ITV1, 5 December 2012
- Doctor Foster – BBC One, 2015-present
- Doctor Who, "Knock Knock" – BBC One, 6 May 2017
- King Charles III – BBC Two, 10 May 2017 (film adaptation of his play of the same name)
- Trauma – ITV, 2018
- Press – BBC One, 2018
- Sticks and Stones – ITV, 2019
- Life – BBC One, 2020

=== Radio ===
- Not Talking – commissioned by BBC Radio 3 show The Wire, 2 March 2006
- The Family Man – 2007 5 part Radio Drama produced for Woman's Hour on BBC Radio 4
- Love Contract – BBC Radio 4, 14 November 2007
- Liam – Woman's Hour Drama for BBC Radio 4, 14–18 September 2009.
- Heart – Afternoon Play for BBC Radio 4, 18 May 2011.
- The Core – Woman's Hour Drama for BBC Radio 4, 5–9 September 2011.
- The Right Honourable – a radio play, broadcast 2 November 2013

=== Directing work ===
- Lark Rise to Candleford – July–October 2005 (Shapeshifter/Finborough Theatre)
- Soldiers – July–August 2004 (Shapeshifter)
- Medea - an adaptation of Euripides' Medea – touring production for Headlong, 27 September to 1 December 2012

== Awards ==
- 2010 Laurence Olivier Award – Outstanding Achievement in an Affiliate Theatre
- 2015 Laurence Olivier Awards – Best New Play and Outstanding Achievement in Affiliate Theatre
- 2006 Tinniswood Award
- 2006 Richard Imison Award
- 2013 BAFTA award nomination – Breakthrough Talent (Television Craft category)

== See also ==
- List of Old Abingdonians
