= Marius von Mayenburg =

German playwright and dramaturg (born 1972)

- Born: 21 February 1972 (age 54); Munich, Germany
- Education: Hochschule der Künste
- Occupation: Playwright
- Writing career
- Language: German
- Years active: Since 1996
- Notable work: Fireface

Marius von Mayenburg (born 21 February 1972 in Munich) is a German playwright and dramaturg.

== Education ==
In 1994, Mayenburg began his studies at the Hochschule der Künste in Berlin. His first play, Haarmann, was first performed at Baracke (Deutsches Theater in Berlin) in 1996. Since 1999 he is dramaturg and writer-in-residence at the Schaubühne am Lehniner Platz in Berlin.

== Career ==
Fireface (German: Feuergesicht), written in 1997, was his breakthrough as a dramatist. The play was performed at Munich Kammerspiele the following year. Then it was played at the Kleist Theater in Frankfurt (Oder) and at the Deutsches Schauspielhaus in Hamburg. The Hamburg performance gained the most attention. His play Perplex saw its English-language premiere in April 2014 at the Sydney Theatre Company, Australia and Martyr (Märtyrer) at the Unicorn Theatre in London in October 2015. In 2016, a film adaptation of Martyrs was translated into Russian and filmed in Russia under the title The Student and was well received by international critics.

== Accolades ==
For Fireface, Mayenburg was awarded the Kleistförderpreis für junge Dramatiker and Preis der Frankfurter Autorenstiftung.

== Plays ==
- Haarmann (1996)
- Fräulein Danzer (1996)
- Monsterdämmerung (1997)
- Fireface (Feuergesicht) (1997)
- Parasiten (1999)
- Das kalte Kind (2002)
- Fräulein danzer (2003)
- Eldorado (2004)
- Turista (2005)
- Augenlicht (2006)
- Der Häßliche (2007)
- Der Hund, die Nacht und das Messer (2008)
- Der Stein (2008)
- Perplex (2010)
- Märtyrer (2012)
- Stück Plastik (2015)
- Mars (2019)
- Nachtland (2022)
- Ellen B. (2027)
