= Patrick Marmion =

Anglo-Irish playwright, journalist and theatre critic

Patrick Marmion is an Anglo-Irish playwright, journalist and Daily Mail theatre critic.

== Early life and education ==
Marmion grew up in Bristol, England. He is the son of ophthalmic surgeon, Vincent James Marmion. He attended Clifton College and Ampleforth College. He studied English Literature and Language at the University of Edinburgh and holds an MA in Playwrighting Studies from the University of Birmingham. He holds a PGCHE (Post Graduate Certificate in Higher Education) from the University of Kent.

== Career ==
Marmion was a contributor to London arts and culture magazines including City Limits, Time Out and former weekly arts magazine, What's On In London. In the early 1990s he produced and directed plays on the London Fringe, including Decadence by Steven Berkoff (Tabard Theatre).

Plays include The Institute (Etcetera Theatre); Terms & Conditions (White Bear Theatre) reviewed in The Daily Telegraph; The Divided Laing, or The Two Ronnies, about the Scottish psychiatrist R.D. Laing (Arcola Theatre) reviewed in The Lancet; Great Apes (Arcola Theatre), adapted from the novel by Will Self, reviewed in the London Evening Standard; and Keith? (Arcola Theatre) a reimagining of Molière's Misanthrope and Tartuffe, reviewed in The Arts Desk.

Screenplays include Mushroom Soup, developed with Sam Mendes for Renaissance Films. Other screenplays include The Dead Guy, Archie Tanner and the Dodo (developed with the Children's Film Foundation).
