= International reactions to the Gaza War (2008–2009) =

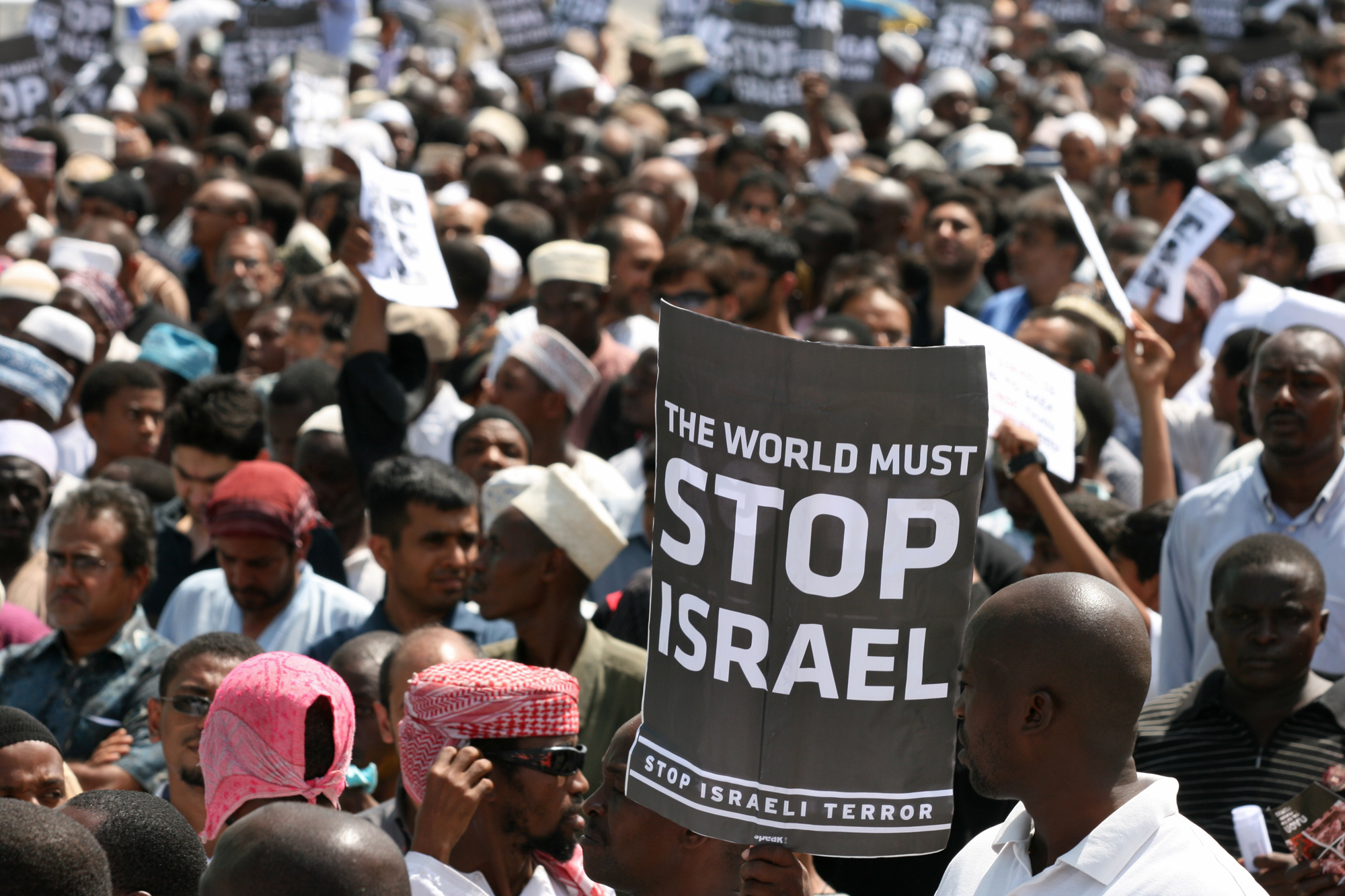
Protest against the war in Dar es Salaam, Tanzania.

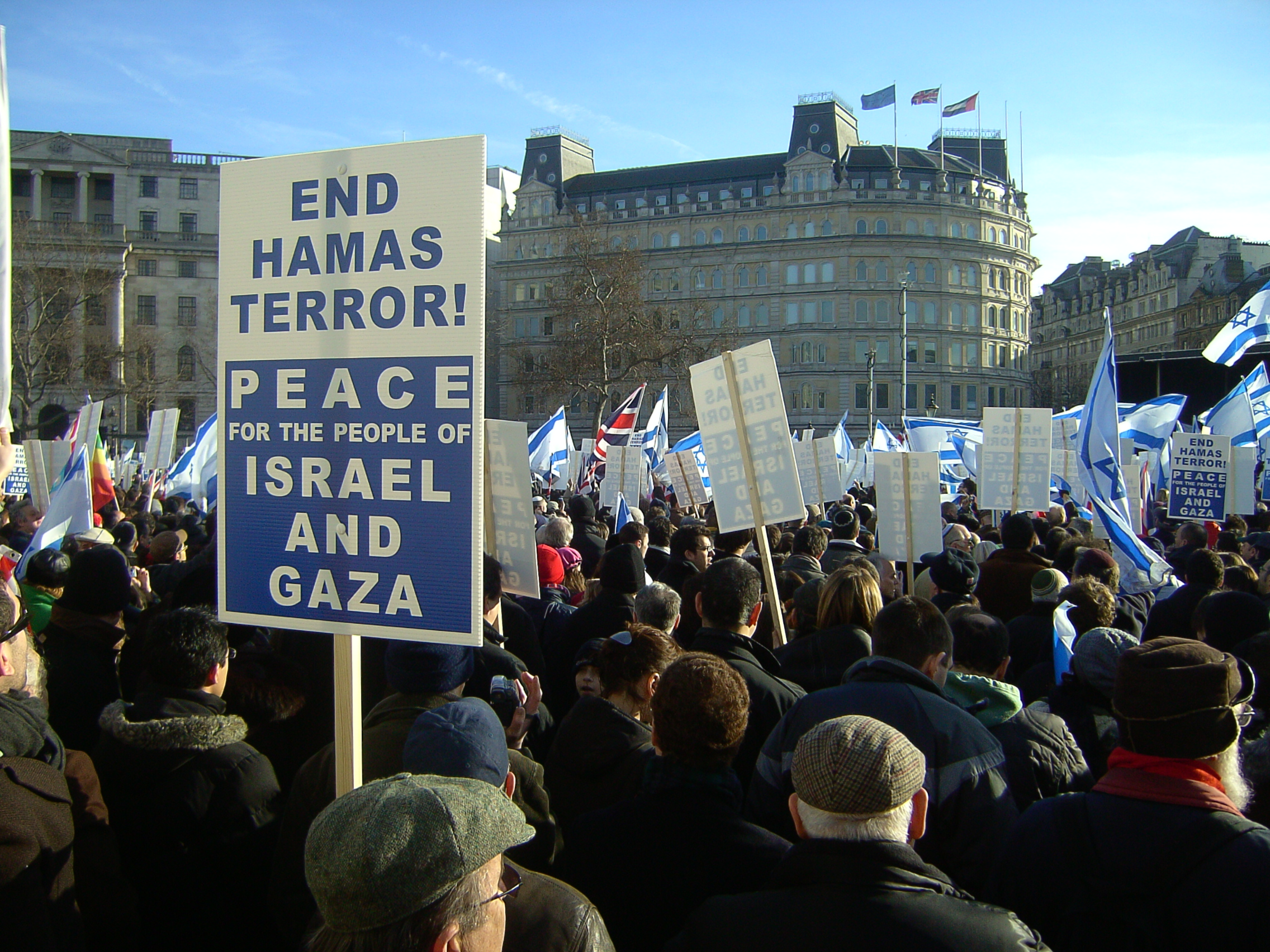
Pro-Israel protest in London, United Kingdom.

International reaction to the Gaza War 2008–2009 came from many countries and international organisations.

International reaction to the conflict was also notable in the level of civilian demonstrations all around the world, which in many cases displayed sentiment significantly different from the official government line.

== Long-term effects and reaction ==
In the aftermath of the crisis, observers suggested Israel's diplomatic position and foreign reputation had been permanently tainted. The New York Times reported in March that Israel was "facing its worst diplomatic crisis in two decades." Other effects on Israel included: Its sports teams met hostility and violent protests in Sweden, Spain and Turkey. Mauritania closed Israel's embassy. Relations with Turkey, an important Muslim ally, deteriorated severely. A group of top international judges and human rights investigators called for an inquiry into Israel's actions in Gaza. "Israel Apartheid Week" drew participants in 54 cities around the world in March 2009, twice the number of last year, according to its organisers. "And even in the American Jewish community...there is a chill."

== Official reactions ==
=== Involved parties ===
Israel – Prime Minister Ehud Olmert said "we tried to avoid, and I think quite successfully, to hit any uninvolved people – we attacked only targets that are part of the Hamas organisations".

Gaza Strip – Ismail Haniyeh, Hamas' leader in Gaza, called Israel's attacks an "ugly massacre". The leader of Hamas in Damascus, Khaled Mashal, threatened revenge attacks, saying "the time for the Third Intifada has come".

Palestine – President Mahmoud Abbas condemned the attacks and called for restraint. President Mahmoud Abbas blamed Hamas for triggering Israel's deadly raids on Gaza by not extending a six-month truce with Israel. Speaking from Cairo on 28 December 2008, he said that 'we ask[ed] [Hamas] ... not [to] end the truce. Let the truce continue and not stop so that we could have avoided what happened'. Later he called Israeli attacks "barbaric and criminal aggression", and threatened to cut off negotiations with Israel.

Fathi Abu Moughli, the Palestinian minister of health, abruptly cut off the payments to Israeli hospitals for treatment of Palestinian patients, forcing hundreds of Palestinians to halt their treatments and cutting them off from proper medical care.

=== United Nations ===
The United Nations Security Council issued a statement on 28 December 2008, calling, "for an immediate halt to all violence", the Arab League, and the European Union made similar calls, as did Argentina, Brazil, China, Japan, Malaysia, Mexico, Peru, the Philippines, Russia, South Korea and Vietnam. Libya pushed to issue a Security Council Resolution urging for a cease-fire, an effort which the US blocked, citing the failure of the statement made 28 December.

On 9 January 2009, the United Nations Security Council passed Resolution 1860 calling for an immediate ceasefire in Gaza and a full Israeli withdrawal by 14 votes to one abstention (the United States), even though US diplomats had been involved in its drafting. Israel and Hamas both ignored calls for a ceasefire.

The United Nations General Assembly adopted Resolution ES-10/18 on 16 January 2009, calling for support of Security Council Resolution 1860. Only 3 countries (Israel, United States, Nauru) voted against the Resolution.

UN Secretary General Ban Ki-moon called for an immediate ceasefire and condemned both Israel and Hamas.

The United Nations High Commissioner for Human Rights, Navanethem Pillay, called for independent investigations into possible war crimes committed by Israeli forces in the Gaza Strip.

=== International Organisations ===
International Organisations
| Organisation | Reactions |
|---|---|
| United Nations | The United Nations – At the beginning of "Operation Cast Lead", a spokesperson for Secretary General Ban Ki-moon stated that "the secretary general is deeply alarmed by today's heavy violence and bloodshed in Gaza, and the continuation of violence in southern Israel". Ban condemned Israel's "excessive use of force leading to the killing and injuring of civilians" and "the ongoing rocket attacks by Palestinian militants". He appealed for "an immediate halt to all violence [and reiterated] previous calls for humanitarian supplies to be allowed into Gaza to aid the distressed civilian population." Following the end of fighting, Ban Ki-moon visited the Gaza Strip. He called the Israeli attacks "outrageous" and demanded guarantees that it would never happen again. After visiting the U.N. headquarters hit by Israel, he called for those responsible to be held accountable: "I am just appalled. I am not able to describe how I am feeling. This was an outrageous and totally unacceptable attack against the United Nations". The president of the UN General Assembly, Miguel d'Escoto Brockmann, described Israel's Gaza offensive as a "genocide" against the Palestinian people. On 12 January, the United Nations Human Rights Council adopted a resolution in which it strongly condemned the ongoing Israeli military operation in Gaza, which had according to the body "resulted in violations of human rights of the Palestinian people", and "demanded the occupying power, Israel, to immediately withdraw its military forces from Gaza." The World Health Organization called on the immediate cessation of violence and the removal of the Israeli blockade of the Gaza Strip, warning that the present situation will result in "preventable deaths". |
| Arab League | The Arab League was planning on holding an emergency summit in Cairo on 28 December, to discuss the attack. The summit was delayed to 2 January 2009, in Doha. On 19 January, at an Arab League summit in Kuwait, Syrian President Bashar al-Assad said Arab leaders should adopt a resolution declaring Israel a terrorist entity, and support Palestinian resistance. According to Arab League: Israel is waging a financial war. |
| OIC | The Organisation of Islamic Cooperation issued a communiqué condemning the "brutal and sustained aggression". The communiqué also called for the Palestinian factions to end their differences and noted the OIC's continued aid works in Gaza and its support for the PNA and other "legitimate institutions" The OIC has requested all "peace-loving nations" work to call the UN general assembly |
| European Union | A spokesman for the European Union's Foreign Policy Chief, Javier Solana, called "for an immediate ceasefire" and urged "everybody to exert maximum restraint". It called for an "unconditional halt" of Hamas rocket attacks and Israeli military action. It also asked for the delivery of food, medical aid and fuel to Gaza, the evacuation of the injured from Gaza, and the permission for humanitarian aid workers to enter area. European Parliament President Hans-Gert Pöttering expressed his "deepest regret" over the escalation of the Gaza conflict between Israel and Hamas, calling for an "immediate end to the violence on both sides". EU Humanitarian aid chief Louis Michel called the destruction left by Israel's offensive "abominable", but said Hamas bore "overwhelming responsibility". |
| ICRC | The International Committee of the Red Cross called "for restraint as hospitals overwhelmed by scale of emergencies". Later on, it continued to emphasise its medical and humanitarian concerns. |
| Non-Aligned Movement | The Non-Aligned Movement voiced its strong condemnation of the escalation of the Israeli military aggression in the Gaza Strip and called upon Israel to end the collective punishment of the Palestinian people. |
| Mercosur | Mercosur released an official statement expressing "concern and repudiation towards the spiral of violence and intimidation taking place in the Gaza Strip". The organisation urged "both sides to end hostilities and formulate a call for the immediate resumption of dialogue, so as to ensure peace and justice in the region". |
| Organization of American States | The Secretary General of the Organization of American States (OAS), José Miguel Insulza, expressed today his "absolute rejection" of the Israeli bombing of the Gaza Strip and urged its immediate halt. At the same time, he called for restoration of the cease-fire, an end to the embargo on the Gaza Strip, and the establishment of a new peace initiative. |
| African Union | The African Union released a press statement stating the following: "The Commission of the African Union (AU) is following with great concern the prevailing situation in the Gaza Strip. The Commission strongly condemns the ongoing air raids on the Gaza Strip by Israel, since 27 December 2008, which has resulted so far in the death of more than 300 Palestinians, while about 1,000 others, including women and children, have been injured." |

=== Non-governmental organisations ===
Non-governmental organisations
| Organisation | Reactions |
|---|---|
| Amnesty International | Amnesty International expressed that "It is utterly unacceptable for Israel to continue to purposefully deprive 1.5 million people of food and other basic necessities. Such a policy cannot be justified on any security or other grounds and must end immediately", said Amnesty International. The organisation "also calls once again on Hamas and all other Palestinian armed groups in Gaza to stop firing indiscriminate rockets against towns and villages in southern Israel". |
| Caritas Internationalis | Caritas Internationalis described the "devastating consequences" of Israeli actions in Gaza highlighting the desperate need for beds, medicines and medical staff. It expressed concern over the difficulty Gazan medical personnel were having in reaching the wounded and commented on the high number of women and children being wounded. Caritas called for the "immediate end" to Hamas rocket attacks and the Israeli offensive. |
| Norwegian People's Aid | The Norwegian People's Aid issued the following statement: "Israel's actions on the Gaza Strip must be characterised as war crimes. The massive attacks affecting people who are not combatants, the disproportionate military use of violence and the blockade of an entire population are clear breaches of the international law for humanitarian concerns as laid down in the 4th Geneva Convention, both where the obligations of an occupying power and the rules of warfare are concerned." |
| World Council of Churches | The WCC condemned all violence in Gaza, and called for an immediate end to the violence on 30 December 2008. |
| Jewish Voice for Peace | Jewish Voice for Peace(JVP) joined marches and demonstrations condemning Israel in many cities, including Racine, Wisconsin, Seattle, and other cities. Official JVP statement reads "We condemn Israel's assault on Gaza. As of today, more than 1,000 Palestinians have been killed by the Israeli assault, including at least 335 children and many more civilians." |

=== Countries ===
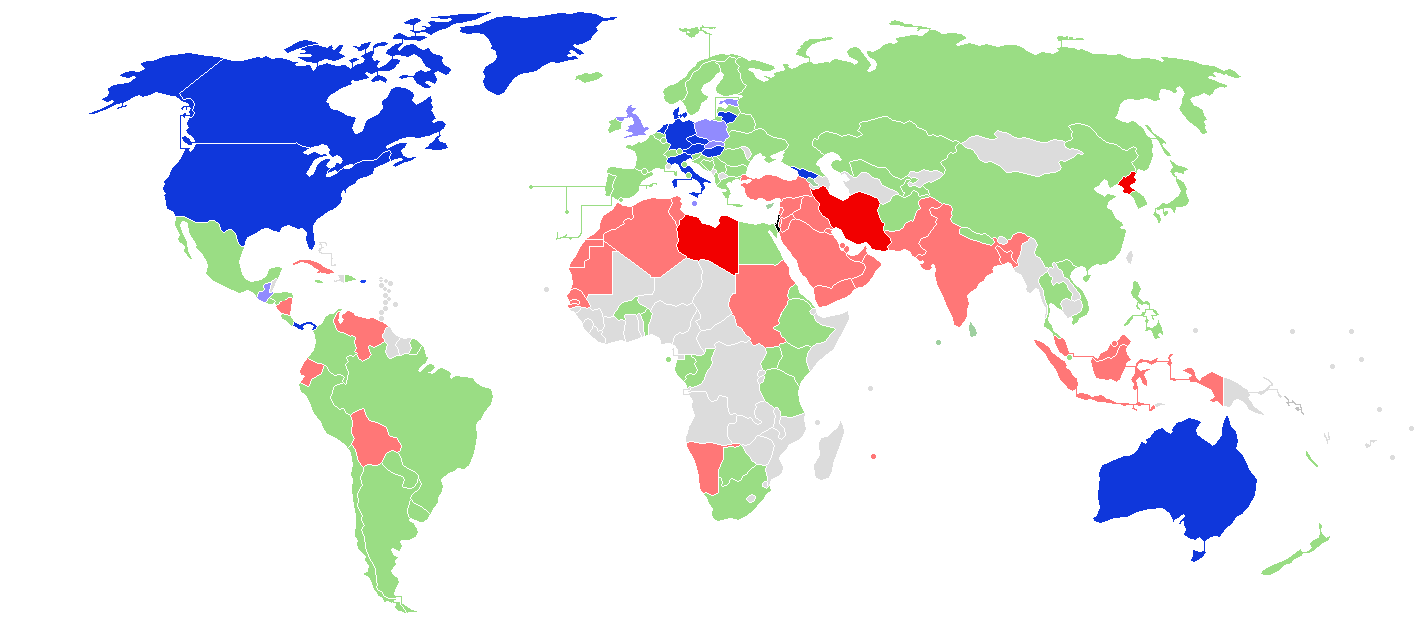
International reaction to the 2008–2009 Israel–Gaza conflict Israel-Gaza States that endorsed the Israeli position/defined Israel's action as falling within its right to defense. States that condemned Hamas action only. States that endorsed the Hamas position/defined Hamas' actions as falling within its right of resistance. States that condemned Israeli action only. States that called for an end to hostilities, and condemned neither/both belligerents. States that made no official statement on the conflict.

Most of the world condemned both belligerents, or neither of them, and simply called for peace or expressed concern for civilian casualties.

Thirty-five states condemned Israel's attacks exclusively. Three of them expressed support for Hamas' operations or defined them as falling within its right of resistance. Bolivia, Mauritania, Qatar, and Venezuela significantly downscaled or severed their relations with Israel in protest of the offensive.

Nineteen states, mostly in the western world, condemned Hamas' attacks exclusively. Thirteen of them expressed support for Israel's operations or defined them as falling within Israel's right to self-defense.

For detailed diplomatic responses, refer to the table below.

Diplomatic responses
| Country | Notes |
|---|---|
| Afghanistan | President Hamid Karzai's chief spokesman Hamayon Hamidzada said that, "We strongly condemn the barbaric attacks of Israel forces against civilians and defenseless people of Palestine in Gaza strip." On the floor of the UN General Assembly, Afghanistan said that it "stood with the Security Council in condemning all violence against civilians and in calling for immediate implementation of resolution 1860." |
| Albania | The Ministry of Foreign Affairs "calls upon the parties for tranquility and maturity by expressing its belief that both parties will show self restrain and will turn back to bilateral discussions as the only way for the stabilisation of the situation to the benefit of the two peoples and the whole Middle East region". |
| Algeria | Prime Minister Ahmed Ouyahia said "In the name of government, I express our strong condemnation of crimes against humanity perpetrated by Israel for a week against Gaza's people." |
| Argentina | The government of Argentina called for "a return to dialogue and negotiations without delay" and expressed its "deep regret" over the acts of violence taking place, urging both Israel to "end all bombings on Gaza Strip" and Hamas to "end its rocket attacks on Israeli territory". |
| Armenia | The Ministry of Foreign Affairs issued a statement, declaring: "We are deeply concerned about the events in Gaza Strip, during which hundreds of people have already been killed or wounded. We express hope that the violations will stop and negotiations will immediately start for the solution of all disputable issues in a peaceful way." |
| Australia | Prime Minister Kevin Rudd said that Australia recognises Israel's right to self-defence, and that "The escalation in the conflict, following the (action by) Israeli ground forces, underlines the absolute importance of bringing about an effective diplomatic solution." He also said that "It is critical, therefore, for Israel to meet its humanitarian obligations under international humanitarian law towards the people of Gaza, ensuring that they have access to basic goods, food and humanitarian assistance and medical supplies." |
| Austria | Foreign Minister Michael Spindelegger said, "We demand an immediate stop to the rocket attacks against Israel from within the Gaza Strip. The right of the Israeli people to a life in peace and security without permanent threat from rocket attacks must be guaranteed. [...] Israel's legitimate right to self-defence is undisputable. It is clear, however, that even during military operations, international law must be complied with. The large number of civilian victims in recent days is unacceptable." |
| Bahrain | The Bahraini Parliament Council strongly condemned "the barbaric massacre by the Israeli enemy against the unarmed Palestinians in Gaza that clashes clearly with all religions, ethics and international accords". |
| Bangladesh | Prime Minister-designate Sheikh Hasina condemned Israeli attack and called on Muslim leaders to help stop the attacks. |
| Belarus | The Republic of Belarus condemned the use of force "the loss of life among the peaceful population of Palestine and Israel. The conflicting parties should immediately cease hostilities and embark on handling the existing problems by way of negotiations". |
| Belgium | Minister of Foreign Affairs De Gucht expressed "horror and dismay at the dramatic rise in the number of victims of Israeli attacks in the Gaza Strip". |
| Benin | On the floor of the UN General Assembly, Benin condemned Israel's attacks on UN infrastructure. The country also announced that it "supported a diplomatic solution, particularly the Franco-Egyptian plan, and called on all stakeholders to continue negotiations to ensure that compromise prevailed." |
| Bolivia | The Bolivian government strongly condemned the Israeli air strikes of Palestinian territory of Gaza. Its statement said the successive Israeli air strikes against civilians in the Gaza Strip were crimes and the attacks represent a severe and massive violation of the International Humanitarian Law. On 14 January, Bolivia broke diplomatic relations with Israel and during a press conference President Evo Morales asked for the revocation of Shimon Peres's Nobel Peace Prize for failing to stop the invasion. |
| Bosnia and Herzegovina | Federation of Bosnia and Herzegovina – Bosniak member of the Presidency of Bosnia and Herzegovina Haris Silajdžić visited the Palestinian Embassy in Sarajevo along with Minister of Health Safet Omerović and Minister of Human Rights and Refugees Safet Halilović, to express their solidarity with the Palestinians in Gaza. He also said that it was necessary to urgently terminate all military activities due to the growing number of civilian victims. Republika Srpska – Prime Minister Milorad Dodik sent a letter of support to Israeli President Shimon Peres in which he expressed understanding for the difficult position of Israel and its citizens. He said that "Republic of Srpska does not support anti-Israel demonstrations and rallies, organised in the other part of Bosnia and Herzegovina". He expressed the full support to the president of Israel in ensuring the safety and peace to the people of Israel. |
| Botswana | Minister of Foreign Affairs and International Cooperation, Phandu Skelemani said "The Botswana position is that we don't need war. War has never brought any solution to problems. The downside about war is that it affects innocent elderly people, women and children, not those who initiate it." He emphasised Botswana's view that both parties "must learn to talk" to resolve their differences and that "If people have mouths and brains but decide to fight, then there is real poverty in their thinking. Neither Israel nor Gaza will disappear if both parties engage in dialogue, as opposed to war." |
| Brazil | The Ministry of External Relations of Brazil issued the following statement on 27 December: "Brazil deplores the disproportionate Israeli reaction, as well as the launching of rockets against southern Israel." Following the escalation of the violence in Gaza, it added: "The Brazilian Government deplores the continued disproportionate actions by the Israeli Government in the Gaza Strip, which have caused, in only 3 days, the deaths of over 300 Palestinians, many of whom were civilians and children. Brazil calls on both parties to cease mutual hostilities immediately". |
| Brunei Darussalam | "His Majesty's Government condemns the military action taken by Israel in Gaza that has caused the death and injury of so many innocent Palestinians. In expressing its deep regret over such disproportionate use of force against the Palestinian people, Brunei Darussalam is concerned that the deterioration of the situation in Gaza may undermine international efforts to bring about a just and peaceful solution to the conflict.". |
| Bulgaria | Bulgaria's Foreign Affairs Ministry appealed "to the both sides in the conflict avoid violence that has already took many human lives." |
| Burkina Faso | Speaking on the floor of the UN Security Council, the delegation of Burkina Faso said, "We condemn the use of force by anyone on either side. We regret the great loss of life in the current crisis, including among civilians, that has resulted from Israel's disproportionate military operations in Gaza. [...] We also cannot condone the repeated firing of rockets by Hamas, which endangers the lives of both Israeli and Palestinian civilians. My delegation calls for an immediate ceasefire in order to avert an escalation that could engulf the entire region [...]." |
| Canada | Canada's foreign affairs minister, Lawrence Cannon, issued a statement in which he pointed to Israel's "clear right to defend itself" against continuing attacks by militants he accused of "deliberately" targeting civilians. "First and foremost, those rocket attacks must stop. At the same time, we urge both sides to use all efforts to avoid civilian casualties and to create the conditions to allow safe and unhindered humanitarian access to those in need in Gaza". Cannon also urged renewed efforts to reach a truce. |
| Cape Verde | The Government of Cape Verde supported the call for the establishment of a ceasefire and the immediate withdrawal of Israeli forces from the Gaza Strip, per Resolution 1860 of the Security Council. Statement also said that the government "believes that the massive and disproportionate attacks by Israel to the Gaza Strip are in violation of international humanitarian law, exacerbating the already difficult humanitarian situation of the people civilians in the territory, exacerbate tensions in the sub-region and create a climate conducive to the development of extremism." |
| Chile | The Chilean government formulates a call to an immediate cease of hostilities and provocations, "and deeply regrets the disproportionate use of force by Israel in the Palestinian territories. The Government of Chile reiterates its most absolute conviction that the military solution won't conduct to peace, to which Israelis as well as Palestinians have rights." Chilean President Michelle Bachelet said that, "Our biggest call is to stop all actions from both sides." On the floor of the UN General Assembly, Chile "deplored the Israeli aggression, as well as the launching of rockets towards Israel." |
| China | "China expresses serious concern about the escalation of the tense situation in Gaza, denounces actions that cause injuries and deaths to ordinary people, opposes the use of military force in resolving disputes, appeals to related parties to exercise maximum restraint and to settle differences through dialogue", Foreign Ministry spokesman Qin Gang in a statement posted on the ministry's website. |
| Colombia | Minister of Foreign Affairs Jaime Bermúdez called for an end to "all types of military aggression and for a dialogue" between Israelis and Palestinians. Colombian government, expressed its "profound sadness and great worry faced with the violence in the Gaza Strip." |
| Congo, Republic of the | President Denis Sassou Nguesso called on the UN Security Council to "fully commit itself in order to end the armed confrontation between Israelis and Palestinians in the Gaza Strip". He said "While condemning the use of force and deploring the human losses as well as the sufferings of innocent people, we urge the international community, mainly the UN Security Council, to fully commit to end the language of weapons." He also said that any resolution of the crisis must be comprehensive, taking into account the right of both the Israeli and the Palestinian to exist. |
| Costa Rica | Foreign Ministry issued a statement saying "We condemn the excessive use of force by Israel, and we condemn terrorist acts by Hamas against Israeli territory, including the launching of rockets". The statement also expressed "deep concern" over civilian casualties in Gaza and called for greater humanitarian aid to Palestinians living there. |
| Croatia | Croatian President Stjepan Mesić expressed deep concern over the escalation of violence in the Middle East and said that a "solution cannot be reached with wars or shelling civilian targets in Israel, or actions by suicide bombers in which innocent people are killed without exception, or massive military retaliation operations such as the attack on Gaza. Peace and coexistence with the recognition of reality are the only perspective of the Middle East. As a country that considers itself with reason a friend of Israel, but also Arabic countries and the Palestine people, and as a member of the Security Council, Croatia expects the United Nations to undertake urgent, rational and constructive steps to prevent a further escalation of violence in the Middle East.". |
| Cuba | In a statement issued in Havana, the Cuban Revolutionary Government called the Israeli military operation "criminal", terming it as "the bloodiest attack Israel has ever launched against the Palestinian people". |
| Cyprus | Both Greek and Turkish Cypriot leaders condemned the violence, "Israeli forces' use of disproportionate power", and called for the immediate cease-fire. In a statement, the Ministry of Foreign Affairs of Cyprus also emphasised the need for direct peace talks of the Israeli and Palestinian leaderships towards a comprehensive solution to the Palestinian problem, and the positive role neighboring countries can play. The Government of the Republic of Cyprus expresses its support to the Palestinian Authority and emphasises the prospect of intra-Palestinian reconciliation efforts under the mediation of Egypt, considering that there can not be a military solution to the issue of Gaza. |
| Czech Republic | Czech foreign affairs minister Karel Schwarzenberg said that "Israel has the right to take military action against attacks on locations where its civilians live" and that "no political dialogue is possible because of Hamas's attacks on Israeli settlements. However, it is unfortunate that the living conditions in Gaza are very bad. These conditions need to be changed in such a way that they do not make young people join radical organisations". Schwarzenberg also condemned Hamas' placement of strategic military targets in densely populated areas, and hinted that this likely elevated civilian casualties. Czech prime minister Mirek Topolánek, the current boss of the EU presidency, said through his spokesman for the presidency issues, Mr Jiří Potužník, that he understood the Israeli actions to be defensive in character. Pressure from some old EU member countries has led Mr Potužník to retract the statement and apologise for this actual attitude of the current EU presidency that was not allowed to become the official attitude of the EU. |
| Denmark | In a press release, Danish Foreign Minister Per Stig Møller expressed his concerns for the escalating crisis in Gaza, saying that "The new spiral of violence in the Middle East is deeply disturbing. [...] If the fighting continues, it will only favour Hamas". On 7 January, Denmark summoned the Israeli ambassador in Copenhagen in protest at attacks on clinics run by a Danish charity in Gaza. Danish Prime Minister Anders Fogh Rasmussen said that, "it was Hamas that broke the truce, and Hamas started the conflict by firing rockets on Israel. No country can just passively accept being fired on." On the floor of the UN General Assembly, Denmark "fully acknowledged the right of Israel to defend itself against rockets and terrorist attacks and its right, according to the Charter, to self-defence [...] within the limits laid out by, and in compliance with, humanitarian law." |
| Dominican Republic | Foreign minister Carlos Morales said "We reject the excessive use of force conducted since December 27 by the Israeli army; but also the launching of rockets to Israeli territory from the Gaza Strip." Later Dominican Republic also signed a joint statement of the Central America Regional Integration System that called for "an immediate withdrawal of the Israeli army". The resolution also demands that the United Nations Security Council "intensify the efforts to recover the stability in the zone" of the conflict in compliance of its function to maintain peace and international security. |
| Ecuador | President Rafael Correa issued a statement saying "Ecuador joins the call to implement a condemnation of Israel for crimes against humanity committed against the Palestinian people living in Gaza Strip". |
| Egypt | Egypt condemned the Israeli attacks, but Egypt's foreign minister, Ahmed Aboul Gheit, said that Egypt has long warned Hamas that this would be Israel's response should Qassam fire continue. As a result of many protests, Egypt opened up the Rafah Border Crossing to allow the wounded into Egyptian hospitals. The Egyptian Ministry of Health sent 30 buses to North Sinai to help transport injured Palestinians. The Egyptian Minister of Foreign Affairs said that Hamas does not allow the wounded Gazans to cross the borders to Egypt. Egypt also deployed 500 CSF anti-riot police along the border. At the 6060th UN Security Council meeting the Egyptian representative stated that the "crippling blockade imposed by Israel" is in "flagrant violation" of Israel's responsibilities under international law, international humanitarian law and its specific obligations as an "occupying power". |
| El Salvador | In an official statement, the president of El Salvador, Elías Antonio Saca and the foreign minister, Marisol Argueta de Barillas, expressed concern about the conflict and deplored the "appalling consequences for the civilian population". President said that "both Jews and Palestinians have to understand they have to coexist". |
| Eritrea | Ministry of Foreign Affairs issued a statement saying "The people and Government of Eritrea express deep and unreserved sympathy to the innocent and defenseless Palestinian people in Gaza who are currently being subjected to unacceptable atrocities. Underlining that the Bush Administration holds primary responsibility for this act, the people and Government of Eritrea hope that the incoming Barack Obama Administration would assume its historic responsibility." To this the Eritrean president added, "The pointless killings and murders on both sides must come to an end; a solution must be achieved for the Israeli-Palestinian conflict." |
| Estonia | Foreign Minister Urmas Paet emphasised that Estonia is calling upon Israel and the Palestinian Authority to make an effort to resume talks. He said, "Estonia condemns Hamas's decision not to extend the cease-fire agreement and to continue using terrorist methods to achieve its goals." Estonia also called "for an end to all violence and the restoration of the cease-fire agreement, for currently the number of civilian victims is continuously growing". |
| Ethiopia | Ethiopia's Prime Minister wrote in a report to the Sana'a Forum that, "Military action leading to the killing and suffering of civilians, by whomever is carried out, deserves to be condemned. The latest development between Israel and Hamas should be contained and should not be allowed to deteriorate even further." |
| Finland | Minister Alexander Stubb, has declared that "Finland condemns the escalation of violence in Gaza and urges the parties to calm down the situation. Finland is particularly worried about the rapid deterioration of the civilian living conditions in Gaza. The Israeli air strikes have demanded a disproportionate amount of civilian victims and they must end immediately. Simultaneously Hamas and other extremist groups must immediately cease their rocket attacks. The parties must reinstate the truce without delay." |
| France | French president Nicolas Sarkozy stated he "firmly condemns the irresponsible provocations that have led to this situation, as well as the disproportionate use of force". France condemned the Israeli ground offensive that was initiated on 3 January. The Ministry of Foreign Affairs stated that "France condemns the Israeli land offensive against Gaza, as it condemns the ongoing rocket launches". On 8 January, Prime Minister François Fillon qualified the humanitarian situation in Gaza as "intolerable" and stated: "while France has from the start condemned rocket launches from Gaza, as she condemns rocket launches from Lebanese territory, we also think that nothing justifies the suffering inflicted to civilian populations who live trapped in the Gaza strip". |
| Gabon | President Omar Bongo said "Gabon, like all countries that have already spoken on the issue, is campaigning for a cease-fire and resumption of negotiations between Israelis and Palestinians". |
| Gambia | Gambian President Yahya Jammeh called on "civilised members of the human race" to rise up against "this holocaust that has been unleashed on the helpless Palestinians, whose lands, human dignity and right to peaceful and dignified existence in their own country are being blatantly violated with impunity." In his new year message, President Jammeh said between 1939 and 1945, the whole world waged a war against Nazi Germany to free Jews from the holocaust being perpetrated against them. Jammeh said, however, that if Israel is carrying out similar "genocide/holocaust" against Palestinians on their soil, the international community must not allow that. "The whole world is watching with indifference while Palestinians fall victims of a brutal and inhuman occupying power that is bent on wiping them out", remarked. "This world would be a very dangerous and violent place if such blatant barbaric and genocidal behaviour is condoned by the world community", he added. |
| Georgia | "The escalation of tensions in the Gaza Strip [...] has been triggered by rocket attacks launched by Hamas against innocent Israeli civilians", read a Georgian foreign ministry statement. |
| Germany | German Foreign Minister Frank-Walter Steinmeier has told Hamas to end what he called its "unacceptable" rocket attacks on Israel, while urging the Jewish state to do everything it could to avoid civilian casualties. German Chancellor Angela Merkel on Monday said the blame for renewed violence in the Middle East can be pinned on Hamas. Speaking to Israeli Prime Minister Ehud Olmert by phone, she said responsibility for the three-day-old Israeli air offensive against Hamas in the Gaza Strip lies "clearly and exclusively" with Hamas, according to government spokesman Thomas Steg. |
| Greece | Foreign Minister Dora Bakoyannis said Athens is aligned with the European Union presidency's statement over the worrisome developments. "A conflagration in the Middle East amid an international economic recession is a nightmare prospect that must be avoided at all costs ... The international community has a huge responsibility, it cannot remain idle; it must immediately assume initiatives for a de-escalation of tension". The minister further condemned "all violence and terrorism", saying that Hamas had "sparked" the conflict and Israel's response was "disproportionate". Greek Parliament President Dimitris Sioufas proposed to take a coordinated action aimed at ending the escalating violence in the Middle East, namely, a meeting within the framework of the Euro-Mediterranean Parliamentary Assembly. The presidents of the national parliaments and assemblies of Egypt, Lebanon, Syria, Tunisia, Cyprus, Serbia, Czech Republic and Turkey expressed their support to the initiative, while the president of the Palestinian national authority was positive. Additionally, Israel's Knesset president expressed her appreciation for the proposal, while calling for the manners that will lead to a political solution via Parliamentary diplomacy. |
| Guatemala | Guatemala expressed "its condemnation of the missile launch by Palestinian groups against Israeli territory." It also said that it considered Israeli force "disproportionate", and that it would inevitably lead to loss of innocent lives and "a humanitarian tragedy." |
| Honduras | Honduras called on Israel and Palestine to cease hostilities and expressed confidence that the United Nations can contribute to that achievement. The Honduran Foreign Ministry called for the UN, particularly the Security Council to work on "achieving a consensus to allow the immediate cessation of hostilities, to stop the loss of precious human lives and instability in this region". |
| Hungary | The statement of the Hungarian Foreign Ministry says that it "has been following with great attention and concern the latest eruption of violence in the Middle East and the increasing number of casualties. Hungary considers important the earliest ending of military activities. The perpetuated rocket attacks from the Gaza strip against Israel and the Israeli military operation in response threaten with a new cycle of violence. Hungary supports Israel's right for self-defence within the framework of international law. In this context, it is of high importance to avoid civilian casualties and to guarantee continuously the humanitarian needs of the population in the Gaza strip. Hungary believes that violence caused by continuous provocations hinders any lasting settlement of the Israeli-Palestinian conflict. Peace can only be achieved by compromises of the parties ready for substantive negotiations, supported by the international community including Hungary." The leader of the Hungarian opposition party Jobbik, Krisztina Morvai, attack Israel for its offensive, calling it a "mass murder" and "genocide of the Palestinian people." She sent an open letter to Israel's ambassador to Hungary writing that Israel held itself "above the law", while expressing her belief that Israeli leaders will be imprisoned over their actions in Gaza. She also added that she "rejoiced" when she heard of Israeli casualties, and that "The only way to talk to people like you is by assuming the style of Hamas. I wish all of you lice-infested, dirty murderers will receive Hamas' 'kisses.'" |
| Iceland | Deputy Permanent Representative of Iceland to the UN made the following statement before the Security Council: "My country has condemned the killings of civilians and aligns itself with the Secretary-General of the UN as well as those member states which have called upon Israel to stop immediately its military actions in this densely populated area. Iceland has also condemned the firing of rockets from Gaza to terrorise Israeli civilians. Hamas bears a heavy responsibility for drawing civilians into the conflict zone. However, Israel's actions in Gaza, the past two weeks, are both disproportionate and clearly contrary to international humanitarian law." |
| India | On 29 December, India urged Israel to end its military operations against Palestinian civilians and expressed awareness of the "cross-border provocations" that led Israel to mount the operation. It urged an immediate end to Israeli "use of force against Palestinian civilians in the Gaza Strip that has resulted in large numbers of casualties." On 30 December, India released a second statement condemning what it called Israel's "disproportionate" and "indiscriminate" use of force, and expressed disappointment at the large number of civilian casualties. On 4 January, India condemned Israeli ground attack on Gaza. |
| Indonesia | President of Indonesia Susilo Bambang Yudhoyono said the Indonesian government remained consistent in supporting the struggle of the Palestinian people to maintain their rights and sovereignty. He said that "Israel's unproportionally all-out war on Hamas with a great number of fatalities is an unforgettable human tragedy. We invite all parties to help stop the Israeli attacks and we will continue to support the Palestinian struggle. Indonesia finds it necessary for the UN Security Council to make a formal meeting and issue a resolution to force Israel halt its aggression." |
| Iran | The Iranian Foreign Ministry said that "Iran strongly condemns the Zionist regime's wide-ranging attacks against the civilians in Gaza" and that "the raids against innocent people are unforgivable and unacceptable". Iran's Supreme Leader, Ali Khamenei issued a religious decree to Muslims around the world on 28 December, ordering them to "defend the defenseless women, children and people in Gaza in any way possible", and calling those who die as "martyr[s]". |
| Iraq | The Iraqi government condemned the attack, stating that: "the Iraqi government demands a halt to the military operations, that civilians’ lives are not unnecessarily exposed to danger and requests that the international community honour its responsibilities and take the required measures to stop the attack". The Dawa Party of Prime Minister Nouri al-Maliki called on Islamic countries to cut relations with Israel and end all "secret and public talks" with it. |
| Ireland | Minister for Foreign Affairs Micheál Martin, said "I condemn in the strongest terms Israel's action in launching air strikes in Gaza against Hamas targets which have resulted in widespread civilian fatalities." To this he added, "I strongly condemn the firing of rockets into Israeli territory." |
| Italy | The Ministry of Foreign Affairs released the following statement on 4 January: "The Italian government, with the broad consensus of its parliament, recently reasserted Israel's right to defend itself but, at the same time, launched an appeal to its Israeli friends that they do everything possible to ensure the protection of civilians and the dispatch of humanitarian aid. Once again the gravity and irresponsibility of Hamas’ violation of the truce is clear." Minister of Foreign Affairs Franco Frattini called for a United Nations' Security Council resolution to bring an immediate ceasefire to the Gaza Strip. |
| Jamaica | Ministry of Foreign Affairs and Foreign Trade issued a statement saying, "The Government of Jamaica is deeply concerned at the recent escalation of the conflict in the Gaza Strip. We recognise Israel's right to protect its citizens. We are, however, alarmed at the disproportionate and excessive use of force displayed by the Israeli government, which has resulted in numerous casualties, including the deaths of hundreds of Palestinian civilians, as well as the destruction of infrastructure. [...] We are no less concerned about the indiscriminate firing of rockets over many weeks into Israeli territory by Palestinian militants. This cycle of violence and retaliation impedes efforts to broker lasting peace in the region. [...] Jamaica joins others in calling for a ceasefire and urges both parties to refrain from further action that could result in an escalation of the conflict." |
| Japan | "Japan urges both parties to immediately halt the use of force in order not to escalate the violence further", Foreign Minister Hirofumi Nakasone said in a statement released late Sunday."Japan urges both parties to immediately halt the use of force in order not to escalate the violence further", Foreign Minister Hirofumi Nakasone said in a statement released late Sunday."Japan calls on Israel to exercise its utmost self-restraint. Japan also calls on Palestinian militants to stop attacks from the Gaza Strip against Israel," |
| Jordan | King Abdullah II of Jordan urged Israel to "end the Gaza offensive". As an act of protest against the Israeli actions, an Israeli flag was burned on the floor of the Jordanian Parliament. Jordan has stated in the course of UN meetings that "the military operations were a flagrant violation of international humanitarian law and the Fourth Geneva Convention". Jordanian Prime Minister Nader Dahabi stated that Amman reserves the right to reexamine its relations with Israel in the wake of its intensified military action on the Gaza Strip. |
| Kazakhstan | A Foreign Ministry spokesman said, "Kazakhstan expresses its deep concern and regret over the recent events in Gaza, resulting in the death and suffering of the civilian population, the deteriorating humanitarian situation in Palestine. Kazakhstan calls for an early settlement of the situation through political means and calls upon the parties to renounce violent solutions." |
| Kenya | Prime Minister Raila Odinga backed the UN Security Council decision demanding an immediate cease-fire in the war in Gaza leading to a full Israeli withdrawal. He said "As I speak, however, the violence in Gaza continues. I therefore call upon the entire international community to use all means at their disposal to persuade both parties to cease fire". |
| Kuwait | Deputy Prime Minister and Minister of Foreign Affairs Muhammad A-Sabah A-Salim A-Sabah said that "the Kuwaiti government and nation strongly condemn the aggressions and crimes being perpetrated by the Israeli regime against people in Gaza Strip". |
| Latvia | Foreign Minister Māris Riekstiņš condemned "any use of military and disproportionate force in the solution of this crisis, both by rocket attacks on Israeli territory from the Gaza strip and by Israeli airstrikes on Gaza." |
| Lebanon | The Lebanese Government strongly condemned the "completely in the eyes of the world's brutal aggression" by Israel against the Palestinian Gaza Strip. Prime Minister Fouad Siniora said "On behalf of the Government I expresses strong condemnation of the criminal operation, which takes place in the Gaza Strip". |
| Libya | Libyan leader Muammar al-Gaddafi has accused fellow Arab leaders of adopting a "cowardly" response to Israel's deadly bombardment of Gaza, and vowed to boycott an Arab summit on the crisis called for later this week. He rhetorically asked Arab leaders "How many times have you held emergency summits? Is this the first time you are proposing an emergency summit? How many summits have you held on the Palestinian issue? What have you achieved?". He called for the Arab peace plan proposed between Arab states and Israel to be revoked. He said that "the Arab initiative is nothing more than an Arab scheme, these massacres (in Gaza) were caused because of it. It has encouraged the enemy to do it. We should be ashamed of such proposals. There are hundreds of people dying in the Gaza Strip as victims of the elections in Israel and in the United States. Our children are being slaughtered for the sake of Israel's election. They talk about peace, which kind of peace is this? The Israelis live in peace and us Arabs remain in the ruins. We do not want peace or negotiations, we do not want talks or peace as long as the enemy is capable of massacring us. We are speaking meaningless words. Peace negotiations were a failed attempt, this is our reality. As long as we are unable to be free and unable to stop the attacks and the massacres, what will you do at this convention? The best answer is to revoke what is called the Arab peace initiative." Gaddafi said about Arab leaders "These characters should be ashamed of themselves. They are trading on the name of the Palestinian cause with their cowardly, weak and defeatist stands. One proposes a (peace) initiative. Another offers empty humanitarian relief. The next one makes speech and the other takes an initiative to call for an emergency Arab summit. You should withdraw your initiative, which you have called an Arab initiative. It is an Arab conspiracy." On the floor of the UN General Assembly, Libya said that the Palestinians "had the right to defend themselves with whatever was available to them." |
| Liechtenstein | Liechtenstein said on the floor of the UN General Assembly that, "All military activities had to be stopped; there had to be an immediate end to rocket attacks by Hamas, as well as military actions by Israel." |
| Lithuania | Foreign Minister Vygaudas Ušackas said, "In solidarity with other EU countries, Lithuania expresses big concern regarding provocations, violence and victims in southern Israel and the Gaza Strip, calls for an immediate ceasefire and urges the sides in conflict to return to truce." An official statement by the Lithuanian government said that he "is aware of Israel's right to defend its citizens from the terrorist attacks of Hamas. However, herewith [the] Foreign Minister indicates that while defending from terrorist attacks, innocent civilians should not be hurt in Gaza. And in the current situation, it is necessary to immediately join efforts of the international community in order to ensure that Israel and Hamas return to truce and to guarantee humanitarian aid provision to innocent civilians." |
| Malaysia | On 28 December, Malaysia's Prime Minister Abdullah Ahmad Badawi called upon the United Nations Security Council to take action following the air strikes by Israel on Gaza and the escalating violence, calling for an immediate halt to violence, so as to avoid a humanitarian disaster in Gaza. On 8 January, Badawi called for sanctions to be placed against Israel, denouncing its "excessive deployment of military power" as "absolutely immoral", and saying the international community has a "moral duty" to save the Palestinian people. Following the war, the Malaysian Foreign Minister called for Israeli leaders to be prosecuted for war crimes. Former Prime Minister Mahathir Mohamad criticized the United States and Britain for their support of Israel. |
| Maldives | The government issued a press release expressing its alarm at the escalating violence in the region and the loss of life. The statement called on Israel and Hamas to exercise restraint and put an end to hostilities. It urged both countries to pursue their objectives through dialogue. "Israel must honour its international humanitarian obligations and Hamas must respect Israel's right to security," the statement read. Foreign minister, Dr Ahmed Shaheed, said the Maldives would not be taking any direct action against Israel, it would put pressure on the Israeli government to cease its offensive. |
| Malta | On the floor of the UN General Assembly, Malta "condemned the rocket attacks on Israeli towns and on citizens from Gaza." Maltese Foreign Ministry said that Malta fully supports efforts for a permanent ceasefire in the Gaza Strip and for immediate humanitarian aid to the victims. In a statement, the ministry said Malta continued to be deeply concerned at the ongoing fighting in Gaza, in particular the suffering and anguish of the civilian population in the region. |
| Mauritania | Mauritania, one of only three Arab League countries that enjoys full diplomatic ties with Israel, has suspended its relations with Israel in protest over the Gaza offensive. The ambassador of Mauritania to Israel was recalled, and the Israeli embassy in Mauritania was shut down. On 16 January, Mauritania suspended economic and diplomatic ties with Israel. |
| Mauritius | Mauritian Prime Minister Navin Ramgoolam, Thursday evening (1 January) expressed his government's compassion for the Palestinian people "in these days when hundreds of them are losing their lives in Gaza under Israeli bombing. What is happening in Gaza is unacceptable", Ramgoolam said in his New Year day's address broadcast on national television. He said that Mauritius stood by the people of Palestine and supported the international call for an immediate ceasefire in that country. |
| Mexico | Mexico called on Sunday for an "immediate" halt to Israeli military operations in the Gaza Strip, where massive air raids have killed over 300 people so far. The Mexican government asked for "an immediate halt to military operations" and expressed "grave concern about the bombings conducted on December 27 by the Israeli army and the excessive use of force", the ministry of foreign affairs said in a statement. Mexico "also rejects rockets launched from Gaza on Israeli territory", it added. |
| Morocco | "The Kingdom of Morocco strongly condemns the massive Israeli military operations which have claimed, this morning, the lives of dozens of Palestinian brothers in Gaza strip, and strongly condemns the disproportionate use of force and the tragic escalation of violence", a communiqué of the Foreign ministry said on Saturday. "The Kingdom of Morocco calls for the immediate halt of the hostilities which, beyond the significant loss of life, exposes the region once again to escalation, violence and divisions", the document added. |
| Namibia | Minister of Foreign Affairs, Marko Hausiku said "The Government of Namibia condemns the Israeli bombardments and ground assault on the Gaza Strip. This naked aggression and disproportionate use of force by Israel is unfortunate and only leads to further escalation of violence. The Government of Namibia calls on the Government of Israel to withdraw its troops from the Gaza Strip.". |
| Nepal | The Ministry of Foreign Affairs said in a press release "The Government of Nepal is concerned over the military operation in the Gaza Strip that has caused considerable casualties and material damage with attendant risks of a grave humanitarian catastrophe". The government has also called upon the parties to urgently agree on a cessation of violence, which it said is so crucial to move forward the stalled peace process in the Middle East. |
| Netherlands | Dutch Prime Minister Jan Peter Balkenende said that he understands Israel's moves, given the scores of rockets that are being fired from Gaza onto Israeli targets by Hamas. He refused to condemn Israel for its military action and called for international pressure on both sides. |
| New Zealand | The New Zealand government, which has been reluctant to speak out on the conflict initially, issued a statement on 7 January saying it was "deeply worried by the mounting humanitarian crisis in Gaza as a result of the continuing Israeli ground offensive". Foreign Minister Murray McCully said that attacks on United Nations facilities, including schools, in the Gaza Strip were of grave concern and underlined the need for both sides to agree to an immediate ceasefire. His statement also said "We call for Israel to immediately cease military attacks and for Hamas to immediately cease rocket and mortar attacks. Both sides have obligations to avoid putting civilians in danger. It is imperative both sides focus on the mounting humanitarian situation for the civilian population of Gaza.". He said that the government would not choose sides in the conflict "We've avoided getting into a fairly pointless argument about who and what is a proportionate versus disproportionate response". |
| Nicaragua | President Daniel Ortega demanded the Israeli government stop its criminal acts in Gaza. "I want... to ask the international community to make all necessary efforts to stop the criminal acts of the Israeli government against the suffering Palestinian people", Ortega said in a statement. |
| North Korea | A foreign ministry spokesman of the DPRK "resolutely denounces Israel's killing of unarmed civilians as a crime against humanity, a serious provocation against the Palestinians and other Arab people and an open challenge to the Middle East peace process". On the floor of the UN General Assembly, North Korea stated that it "fully supported Palestinians’ struggle to expel Israeli aggressors from their Territory and restore their right to self-determination." |
| Norway | Norway's Foreign Minister Jonas Gahr Støre has said that using warplanes against Gaza is unacceptable, as it is impossible to separate civilians from soldiers in this small area. He also says that Hamas must cease the launching of rockets into Southern Israel. On 4 January, Prime Minister Jens Stoltenberg criticised the Israeli ground offensive into Gaza, calling it "a dramatic escalation". He also urged the UN Security Council to pass a resolution requesting the immediate halt in the fighting. Foreign Minister Støre also criticised the Israeli ground offensive in Gaza, saying that it "constitutes a dramatic escalation of the conflict. Norway strongly condemns any form of warfare that causes severe civilian suffering, and calls on Israel to withdraw its forces immediately." The Norwegian Foreign Ministry also declared: "Norway has condemned and continues to condemn Hamas’ firing of rockets from Gaza at civilian targets in Israel." |
| Oman | Deputy Prime Minister Sayyid Fahd bin Mahm-oud Al Said said "We condemn the Israeli aggression on the Palestinian people and the excessive use of force by Israel instead of resolving outstanding issues by adopting amicable methods We also confirm that this unacceptable Israeli attitude will not resolve any problem, but will increase tension and instability in the region. A comprehensive and just peace could only be achieved by reverting to dialogue." |
| Pakistan | President Asif Ali Zardari, Prime Minister Yousuf Raza Gilani and Foreign Minister Shah Mehmood Qureshi have condemned the Israeli attacks in Gaza that killed over 200 people on Saturday and have appealed for cessation of hostilities. President Asif Ali Zardari further said Israel's air raids on Gaza Strip have "violated the Charter of United Nations". He also urged the entire world to take swift action of Israel's raids on Gaza as it was as open violation of UN Charter. On 11 January, the Permanent Representative of Pakistan to the UN, Hussain Haroon, called for an immediate ceasefire and calm. He criticised Israel saying the unrestrained use of force, scale of destruction, killing of innocent civilians, including women and children, the violation of UN safe havens, and the collective punishment of an entire people were blatant breaches of international law. He said that those act, in their totality, constituted war crimes and crimes against humanity. He also called for the end of Israel's blockade in Gaza. |
| Panama | On the floor of the UN General Assembly, Panama "condemned the attacks of Hamas and supported Israel's right to defend itself." It also emphasised that, "that right must be applied with proportionality." |
| Paraguay | In a communique from the Foreign Ministry, the Paraguayan authorities urged the parties to "immediately cease military action (and) to return to dialogue to find a peaceful solution to their disputes". |
| Peru | The Government of Peru expresses his deep preoccupation by the situation of violence in Gaza and the south of Israel that has brought consequently the irreparable loss of human lives, and makes a call to the immediate cease of hostilities in this region. The Government of Peru supports recent Official notices of the Secretary General of United Nations and of the Security Council of this international organism with respect to this violent scaling so that, in the brief term, all the involved parts suspend all military activity and the conversations can be reinitiated that allow to lay the way to find solutions to the existing problems in the context of the Israeli relation – Palestine. The Government of Peru makes arrive his more felt condolences at the families of all the victims and soon formulates votes for a reestablishment of the calm in Gaza and the south of Israel. |
| Philippines | The Philippines was deeply concerned about the worsening situation in Gaza and southern Israel stating that "The Philippines deplores the continuing violence, rocket attacks and excessive use of force that have already resulted in much damage and suffering and hundreds of casualties, particularly with civilians." |
| Poland | Polish Ministry of Foreign Affairs has released the following statement: Ministry of Foreign Affairs of the Republic of Poland is deeply concerned about the escalation of violence in Gaza and expresses regret over the growing number of civilian casualties. "We condemn rocket attacks against Israel by Hamas. We also find no justification for the scale of military operation taken in response by the Israeli side. We call for immediate cessation of military actions by both sides, resumption of peace negotiations with a view to establishing a permanent truce". |
| Portugal | Portuguese Foreign Ministry called on Israel and the Palestinians to work for a solution to their conflicts and stop fighting in the Gaza Strip. |
| Qatar | Qatar has condemned the attacks on the Gaza Strip, and has arranged for an extraordinary Arab League summit to be held in Doha on 2 January to discuss a unified Arab stance against the operation. Qatar sent two planes with medicine and food to al-Arish in Egypt for Gaza. On 16 January, Qatar suspended economic and diplomatic ties with Israel. |
| Romania | Minister of Foreign Affairs, Cristian Diaconescu, pointed out Romania's concern about the current situation and has expressed his belief that the cessation of violence and identification of solutions for the humanitarian issues from the Gaza Strip are absolutely necessary in view of resumption of political dialogue. He said that from Romania's point of view, the solution to this crisis may be found only by political means and he has emphasised Romania's availability to undertake, in cooperation with the partners from EU and following bilateral actions, the diligences necessary to support the political-diplomatic regulation of this crisis. Minister Diaconescu has also showed that, understanding the daily difficulties the population from the Gaza Strip is facing for, the Romanian authorities are available also for the identification of certain solutions to grant humanitarian assistance. |
| Russia | Russia called for a stop of "large-scale acts of force against the Gaza Strip, which has caused considerable victims and suffering amongst the Palestinian population", but also called for Hamas to "stop shelling Israeli territory". In his talk to Prime Minister Olmert President of Russia Dmitry Medvedev "Voiced serious concern over numerous civilian victims and humanitarian problems stressing the need for the soonest ceasefire in Gaza". Foreign Minister Sergei Lavrov added that "the disproportionate use of force by Israel, which causes suffering to the civilian population, can be neither understood nor justified". |
| Sahrawi Arab Democratic Republic | The government of the SADR condemned the massacre in the Gaza strip, considering that "the use of force, the policy of colonial occupation, killing and terror against defenseless citizens are contrary to morals, laws and customs of the humanity and are in contradiction with international legality.". Basing on that, the Sahrawi government "expresses its solidarity with the Palestinian people in the tragedy subsequent to the massacre perpetrated by Israeli forces against Palestinians in Gaza Strip, and supports their battle to defend their independence and territorial sovereignty". |
| San Marino | Antonella Mularoni, Secretary of State for Foreign Affairs said "The San Marino Government hopes that a prompt solution will be found to guarantee peaceful coexistence to both Palestinians and Israelis who are entitled to peacefully live in that land. The ongoing crisis in the Gaza Strip is unfortunately the dramatic result of Hamas’ truce violation followed by Israeli retaliation. Therefore, we sincerely hope that no efforts will be spared at national and international level to reduce as much as possible the bloodshed and the number of innocent victims who have the right to durable peace." |
| Saudi Arabia | Saudi Arabia urged the United States to intervene to end Israeli attacks on Gaza, calling the attacks "occupation and mistreatment of Palestinians." Saudi police reportedly broke up a pro-Gaza protest on 29 December, (though the Interior Ministry denied such an event took place). Awadh Al-Qarni, a Saudi cleric, issued a fatwa permitting the targeting of Israeli interests worldwide in retaliation for the Gaza attack. Saudi Arabia has blamed divisions amongst the Palestinians for the conflict, as well as Hamas for provoking Israel. |
| Senegal | The Senegalese president, Abdoulaye Wade, declared that "Senegal... requires Israel to withdraw immediately and without condition from the Palestinian territory, put an end to this invasion and to stop the air raids." |
| Serbia | Foreign Minister Vuk Jeremić said "We are joining the voice of the whole world, which condemns the violence in Gaza, and we call for the stopping of missile attacks on Israel and Israeli attacks against the Gaza strip". Ministry of Foreign Affairs issued a statement saying "Ministry of Foreign Affairs of the Republic of Serbia condemns attacks in the Gaza Strip, and calls for calming of military actions in which guiltless civilians are killed. The Republic of Serbia welcomes the decision of the U.N. Security Council and joins in with the rest of the world in condemning the violence in the Middle East. Republic of Serbia is committed to a peaceful resolution of all conflicts, and calls on both sides to stop the attacks which cause a humanitarian catastrophe." President of the National Assembly Slavica Đukić Dejanović accepted a proposal of the Greek Parliament President for a regional conference aimed at ending the escalating violence in the Middle East. |
| Singapore | Singapore called on all parties in Gaza to exercise maximum restraint and work towards an early re-establishment of the cease-fire, the country's Ministry of Foreign Affairs said in a statement on Monday night. "We are deeply concerned about the situation in Gaza with mounting civilian casualties and the possibility of a humanitarian catastrophe", a spokesman of the ministry said in the statement. |
| Slovakia | In a statement, the Ministry of Foreign Affairs of the Slovak Republic "condemns the escalation of the violence between Israel and Hamas in Gaza Strip after the unilateral dismissal of the truce by the Palestinian extremists and calls both parties for an immediate halt to the violent actions. MFA calls on Israel to avoid any use of disproportionate force and to consider the risk of an expansion of the conflict in the region." |
| Slovenia | Ministry of Foreign Affairs issued a press release saying "The Ministry is closely following the current situation in Gaza and south Israel, and expresses concern regarding the increased violence that has been claiming more and more civilian victims. The Ministry condemns Hamas's interruption of the cease fire that had been in place and the constant rocket attacks on Israeli territories, while at the same time opposing the disproportionate use of force on the part of the Israeli army and clear violations of international humanitarian law. The Ministry condemns in particular the Israeli army attacks on schools, health centres and UNRWA buildings. There is no excuse for today's attack on a UNRWA building that killed 40 people, which represents an egregious violation of international humanitarian law. The Ministry therefore calls on Hamas to cease all rocket attacks on Israel immediately and on Israel to stop its military action. The Ministry also advocates the unhindered opening of all border crossings with Gaza in order to ensure the supply of humanitarian aid and fuel, and the presence of medical staff. Moreover, conditions must be created for the safe distribution of aid to the civilian population. The Ministry is already examining possibilities of immediate help to alleviate the humanitarian catastrophe in Gaza. Greater engagement of the EU and its international partners is of crucial importance in achieving sustainable peace. To this end, an EU delegation is paying an important visit to the region, and Egypt, the Arab League and Turkey continue to strive for termination of the violence and resumption of negotiations." |
| South Africa | South Africa's Deputy Minister of Foreign Affairs Fatima Hajaig called on Israel to stop military attacks in Gaza and withdraw its forces from the border immediately, and said, "The South African government finds the continued siege on Gaza unacceptable as it does not allow humanitarian relief supply such as medicine, food and water to reach the desperate people of Gaza." "The South African government unequivocally and in the strongest possible terms condemns the escalation of violence on the part of Israel brought about by the launching Saturday night of a ground invasion into Gaza", read a statement issued by the foreign affairs department after the start of Israel's ground offensive. South Africa said that, "the violent situation in Gaza and southern Israel made it imperative for the [UN General] Assembly to collectively and publicly voice its condemnation of the attacks and demand that both sides immediately cease their military attacks." The country made a similar call in the UN Security Council. |
| South Korea | The Government of the Republic of Korea is deeply concerned about the deteriorating situation in and around the Gaza Strip following Hamas's recent attack and Israel's subsequent air-strikes and regrets the large casualties that have resulted from the collisions. |
| Spain | Spanish Foreign Minister Miguel Ángel Moratinos "expressed his firm condemnation of the irresponsible provocation on the part of Hamas in launching rocket attacks, as well as the Israeli Armed Forces’ disproportionate retaliation." Spain offered the International Committee of the Red Cross two trucks of humanitarian aid to be sent to Gaza. |
| Sri Lanka | In a statement issued by the Ministry of Foreign Affairs of Sri Lanka, the government "calls upon all parties concerned to end the violence, to ensure a climate conducive for the re-commencement of negotiations to find a lasting solution to the Israel-Palestine conflict. Sri Lanka has been a consistent advocate for the inalienable rights of the Palestinian people to establish an independent Palestinian State within secure borders to co-exist in peace with its neighbours. Sri Lanka calls upon the parties concerned to exercise utmost restraint and work towards immediate de-escalation of violence in the Gaza Strip." |
| Sudan | The Sudanese government strongly condemned Israeli air raids and called on the UN Security Council and the world society to shoulder their responsibility and exert pressures on Israel to stop the aggressions and lift its blockade against the Palestinian people. The ruling National Congress Party issued a statement, denouncing that the Israeli aggressions using the American weapons has demonstrated the savagery and barbarianism of the military mechanism of Israel. Protesters in Sudan condemned Arab leaders and demanded that they "show Gaza support". Thousands of Sudanese marched towards the Egyptian embassy in Khartoum calling for an opening of Rafah crossing. |
| Sweden | Foreign Minister Carl Bildt harshly condemned Israel's assault on Gaza. On 8 January, asked if Israel had breached international law in the current campaign Foreign Minister Carl Bildt answered "... A massive breach of international law, massive breaches of human rights, a massive humanitarian crisis". He called for an immediate ceasefire, saying "acts of warfare against, from and in Gaza must cease immediately. This must take place without delay." He also called for an end to the isolation of Gaza. Bildt repeated these calls twice on 13 January. |
| Switzerland | On 27 December, the Swiss Federal Department of Foreign Affairs released a statement of its "concern over the most recent escalation of violence in the Gaza Strip" and called "for an immediate end to the acts of violence which are intensifying the suffering of the civil population". On 4 January, a new statement deplores the escalation of violence in Gaza. It called for an immediate cessation of hostilities and has requested a durable reopening of crossings into Gaza. The FDFA also protests the denial by Israeli authorities of access to Gaza by an emergency medical team of the International Committee of the Red Cross. It condemned the rocket attacks from Gaza that have taken place since the end of the truce as an "untenable burden" to Israel's civilian population. Though its right to self-defence was acknowledged, the reaction of the armed forces of Israel was condemned as "disproportional". The FDFA considered recent events to be "serious violations of humanitarian law, which prohibits in particular acts of violence against civilian populations" and called upon all conflicting parties to respect their obligation to respect the Geneva Convention, especially as to refrain from acts of violence against civilian populations. |
| Syria | On 27 December, an official government source stated that "Syria follows, with deep concern, the brutal Israeli aggression on the Palestinian people in Gaza and stresses that what is going on is a heinous crime and convicted terrorist act. Syria condemns this appalling crime and calls on the Arab nations and the International community to use all available means to pressure Israel to stop this aggression immediately, allow the transfer of the injured and ensure them medical care, and open all crossings to allow the access of foodstuffs and health needs to the besieged Palestinian people". Syria also called on the Arab League to hold an emergency summit. A Syrian official stated that Syria was canceling Turkish-brokered Middle East peace talks because of Damascus' anger about the Gaza offensive. At an Arab League summit, Syrian president Bashar al-Assad stated that Arab Leaders should adopt a resolution proclaiming Israel to be a terrorist entity and supporting Palestinian resistance. In al-Yarmouk camp, outside Damascus, dozens of Palestinian protesters vowed to continue fighting Israel. |
| Tajikistan | Statement of the Ministry of Foreign Affairs said "The Ministry of Foreign Affairs of the Republic of Tajikistan expresses concern over crisis in the Gaza Strip. The worsening of the armed clashes in the Gaza Strip, resulted in hundreds of thousands of dead and wounded civilians, including women and children. As a result of collisions Gaza, that is under blockade, could face a humanitarian catastrophe. The Ministry of Foreign Affairs of the Republic of Tajikistan stresses that the problem of the Gaza Strip, the Arab-Israeli conflict and the whole Middle East crisis can not have a military solution. Accordingly, the Ministry of Foreign Affairs of the Republic of Tajikistan calls upon all warring parties to immediately announce the unconditional cease-fire and resume the negotiating process. The Ministry of Foreign Affairs of the Republic of Tajikistan, reaffirming its support for the mediation efforts of countries and organisations aimed at a peaceful solution to the problem of Gaza, expresses confidence that the will of the international community will be able to exclude non-peaceful ways of resolving differences and conflicts." |
| Tanzania | Tanzanian President Jakaya Kikwete said in the statement: "Tanzania believes that there is no military solution to Palestine-Israel conflict and that such actions (ongoing fighting) serve only to increase tension in the region." The Tanzanian president added that the killings were horrifying and that only those two sides (Palestine and Israel) have the key to halting the hostilities. President Kikwete told Palestinian Ambassador to Tanzania, Nasri Khalid Abu Jaish, that it was crucial that the Hamas should stop its rocket attacks against Israel. The president told Israeli Ambassador to Tanzania, Jacob Kdeidar, that the Israeli fury has gone too far and its military actions has provoked vile international reactions in that its actions were causing unjustifiable deaths among the civilians. |
| Thailand | The Foreign Ministry of the Royal Thai Government issued a statement saying that they were "gravely concerned with the escalating situation of violence in the Gaza Strip causing loss of civilians’ lives and damages to public infrastructures" and urged the "withholding of military operation on the Israeli side and an end to the rocket attacks at Israeli civilians from the Gaza Strip". They called for a quick resolution through diplomatic initiatives. |
| Tunisia | The Ministry of Foreign Affairs released the following statement: "Tunisia expresses its deep concern following the Israeli air raids in the Gaza strip which have caused scores of victims among the brotherly Palestinian people. Tunisia condemns this dangerous escalation and reaffirms its call to the international community, and notably the influential powers, for an urgent and energetic intervention, to stop the Israeli aggression, offer the necessary protection to the Palestinian people and put an end to its suffering. Tunisia also stresses that these acts, are likely to increase the tension, aggravate the situation and endanger all the efforts exerted to establish peace, security and stability in the region". |
| Turkey | Prime Minister Recep Tayyip Erdoğan said that "Israel's bombardment of Gaza shows disrespect to the Turkish Republic. We were planning to schedule peace talks between Syria and Israel. Whatever the reason is, killing innocent civilians will damage peace in the world". President of Turkish Republic Abdullah Gül called attacks "irresponsibility" and declared that the Turkish Republic is watching events closely. The Minister of International Affairs Ali Babacan asked the United Nations Security Council to take action immediately. The president of the CHP main opposition party Deniz Baykal said: "the attacks are taking place just before the presidential inauguration in the USA. The timing of these attacks demands attention". Thousands of people marched at Istiklal and İstanbul Beyazıt Avenues in Istanbul, İzmir Basmane Avenue in İzmir, in front of Antalya Murattpaşa Mosque in Antalya, Erzincan Cumhuriyet Avenue in Erzincan, and hundreds of people gathered in front of the Israeli Embassy in Ankara. The Turkish Red Crescent has sent fifteen trucks filled with humanitarian aid. The Turkish Prime Minister Erdoğan asked for the UN to bar Israel from participation, as long as it does not respect the body's calls. During a 29 January World Economic Forum panel discussion in Davos, Switzerland, Erdoğan lashed out at Israeli President Shimon Peres over the military campaign after Peres justified the war, claiming, "The high tone of your voice has to do with a guilty conscience", and "When it comes to killing, you know well how to kill." |
| Uganda | Following the Security Council's call for a ceasefire, Uganda "urge[d] the parties involved to move very quickly to implement the provisions of this resolution." |
| Ukraine | Ministry of Foreign Affairs issued a statement saying "While condemning the firing of rockets into Israeli territory from the Gaza Strip, we express doubts about the proportionality of Israel's use of military force. We urge the parties to the conflict to adhere to the principles of international humanitarian law in parts of the inadmissibility of collective punishment and destruction of civilian populations". |
| United Arab Emirates | In a statement issued by the Foreign Ministry, the UAE voiced its support for holding an emergency Arab League meeting, WAM reported. In a phone conversation, President His Highness Shaikh Khalifa Bin Zayed Al Nahyan discussed with Shaikh Hamad Bin Khalifa Al Thani, Emir of Qatar, the situation in Gaza in view of the Israeli attacks. The UAE also condemned the Israeli government and called for an immediate ceasefire. The Emirate of Dubai also condemned the attacks and cancelled all New Years celebrations in a supposed stand of solidarity with the people of Gaza. |
| United Kingdom | When asked if the UK is "neutral on this", Foreign Office Minister Bill Rammell responded: "I think we’ve taken the right position. We’ve condemned the rocket attacks from Hamas on the state of Israel. [...] But similarly we’ve made clear that there's been a massive loss of life within the Gaza Strip." British Prime Minister Gordon Brown condemned Israel over the shelling of the UN HQ in Gaza and said ""When the United Nations is doing such vital work – humanitarian work amongst women and children in Gaza – no-one can defend this attack by Israeli forces on the compound... The Israelis have now admitted it is a serious mistake." The United Kingdom's government called for "maximum restraint to avoid further civilian casualties" and for an "immediate halt to violence" and on the other side for "militants in the Gaza Strip to immediately cease all rocket attacks on Israel". The British Foreign Secretary David Miliband also warned that Israel's attack might encourage further extremism. Gordon Brown criticised Israel for using excessive force during its three-week military offensive against Hamas in the Gaza Strip. Speaking en route to a humanitarian conference in Egypt, the prime minister demanded that Israel reopen Gaza's crossings and allow humanitarian workers full access to the territory. The UK's Foreign and Commonwealth Office wrote that "We supported the EU statement, which condemned Hamas rocket attacks and described Israeli military action as disproportionate." Peter Kilfoyle, a former Labour defence minister, accused Israel of "state-sponsored terrorism" and urged the government to "ensure no arms were exported to the country." Sir Menzies Campbell, the former Liberal Democrat leader, said "if any other democratic state had behaved in the same way, it would be faced with economic sanctions." British MP and former (shadow?) minister of labour, Sir Gerald Kaufman accused, "Olmert, Livni and Barak are mass murderers, war criminals and bring shame on the Jewish people whose Star of David they use as a badge in Gaza.", Chris Mullin, a former Foreign Office minister, said "These are war crimes that we are witnessing in Gaza." Britain should start talking with EU allies about sanctions and "at the very least to stop selling them weapons and, perhaps, the withdrawal of our ambassador". |
| United States | President George W. Bush initially focused blame for the conflict on Hamas, while reasserting the United States' support of Israel's right to protect itself. The president also expressed concern for the people of Gaza and pledged millions of dollars of aid to the U.N. to help. The United States support of Israel was tempered by President Bush's calls for Israel to consider humanitarian issues and, "to avoid civilian casualties as it targets Hamas in Gaza". The United States supports a cease-fire, but blocked a United Nations Security Council Resolution calling for one, stating that it will only support a plan that will end the rocket attacks into Israel, open the border crossings into Gaza, and deal with the network of smuggling tunnels leading into Gaza. The Department of State declared that, "...any agreement needs to be durable, sustainable, and not limited by time." and has been working both inside and outside of the United Nations to achieve this goal. On 10 January, the United States House of Representatives voted 390 to 5 with 22 abstaining in favor of a resolution "recognising Israel's right to defend itself against attacks from Gaza". |
| Uruguay | With the aim of "achieving a cease of fire in the Gaza Strip that puts an end to the loss of human lives in the region", the Uruguayan government hopes that both parties pledge to the United Nations Security Council Resolution 1860 and wishes that they "cease their military actions and, with the international community's support, start taking steps towards the goal of resuming in brief the peace process" |
| Uzbekistan | Ministry of Foreign Affairs issued a statement saying that "Uzbekistan calls on the conflicting parties in Gaza to cease hostilities and resolve their differences through negotiation". |
| Venezuela | President Hugo Chávez expressed his solidarity with the Palestinian people. On 5 January, Chavez called the violence "state terrorism", saying of the attacks "the Holocaust, that is what is happening right now in Gaza". Chavez accused Israel of "flagrant violations of International Law" and stated that the Israeli Prime Minister and American President be tried at the International Criminal Court. Venezuela expelled Israel's ambassador to Venezuela and part of the embassy personnel, and Hugo Chávez called for Ehud Olmert to be tried for war crimes. On 14 January, the Venezuelan government broke all diplomatic relations with Israel. |
| Vietnam | Vietnam condemned "all indiscriminate attacks against civilians", and urged both parties to seek a peaceful solution to the conflict. Vietnam's Deputy Foreign Minister said, "We urged Israel to stop the excessive and disproportionate use of force, end its military operations and immediately withdraw forces from Gaza." Vietnam called on Israel to immediately lift its blockade and allow humanitarian workers into Gaza. |
| Yemen | Yemeni President Ali Abdullah Saleh condemned the Israeli raids as a "barbaric aggression". |

=== Other sovereign entities ===
Other sovereign entities
| Entity | Notes |
|---|---|
| Vatican City | At the end of his 28 December Angelus Address, Pope Benedict XVI launched an urgent appeal for peace in the Holy Land. A spokesman commented, "Hamas is a prisoner to a logic of hate, Israel to a logic of faith in force as the best response to hate. One must continue to search for a different way out, even if that may seem impossible". On 8 January 2009, the Pope's justice minister, Cardinal Renato Martino, sharply criticised Israel's actions and likened the Gaza Strip to a "big concentration camp". While noting that Hamas rockets into Israel were "certainly not sugared almonds", he called the situation in Gaza "horrific" and said conditions there went "against human dignity." Vatican spokesman, Reverend Federico Lombardi, called Cardinal Martino's choice of words "inopportune". While calling the cardinal "an authoritative person", Rev. Lombardi added that "The more authoritative voice and line would be that of the Pope." |

=== Others ===
Hezbollah leader Hassan Nasrallah has warned that there was a possibility of renewing another conflict. He stated that he was ready for another confrontation with Israel and had previously put all his fighters in the Israeli-Lebanese border on high alert.

=== Religious leaders ===
South African Anglican Archbishop Emeritus Desmond Tutu said Israel's bombardment of Gaza "bears all the hallmarks of war crimes. In the context of total aerial supremacy, in which one side in a conflict deploys lethal aircraft against opponents with no means of defending themselves, the bombardment bears all the hallmarks of war crimes." The attacks would not contribute to the security of Israel, he said.

Iraqi Shia leader Ali al-Sistani, called for decisive action by Arab and Muslim states for an end to Israeli attacks on Gaza. Though he condemned the operation, he stated that "supporting our brothers only with words is meaningless, considering the big tragedy they are facing."

== Civilian demonstrations and protests ==
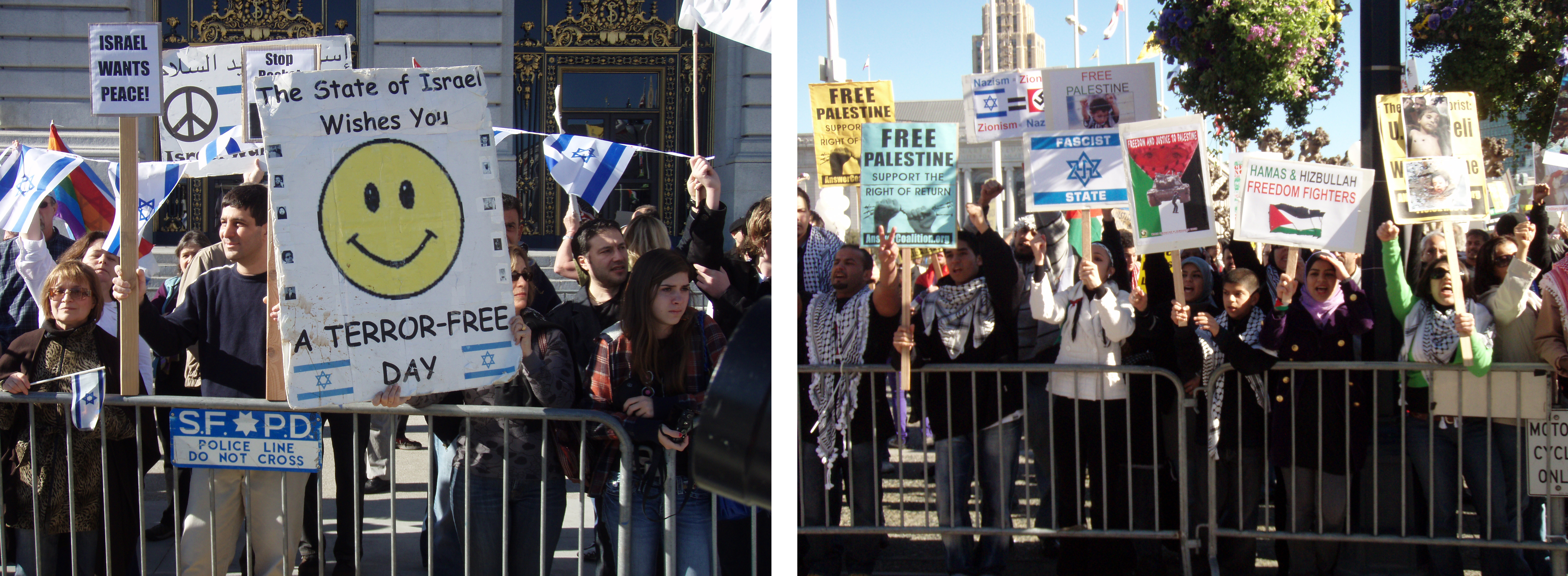
Demonstrations in San Francisco.

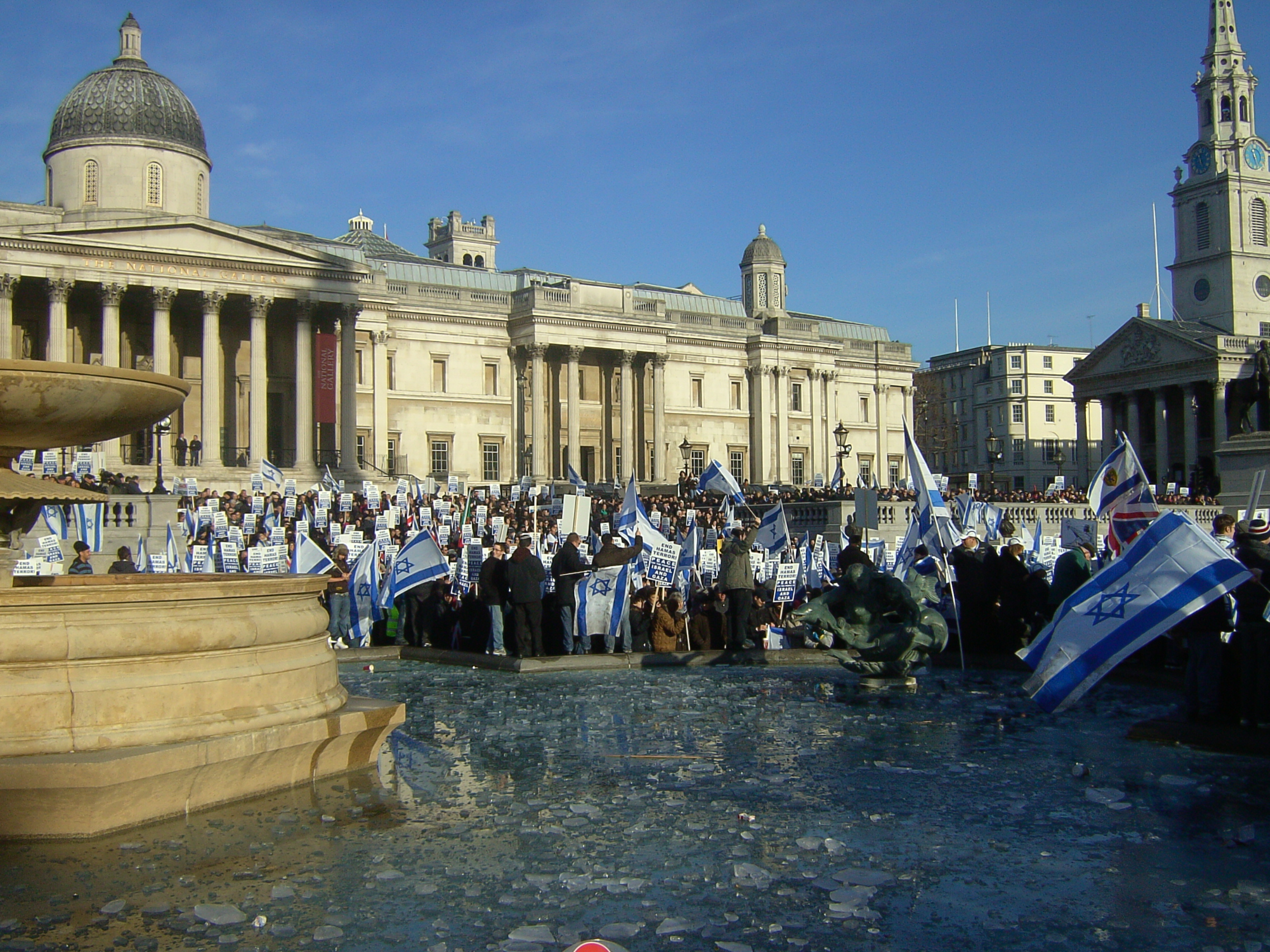
"Peace for the people of Israel and Gaza", pro-Israeli London rally, 11 January 2009

Major protests against Israel were held worldwide. Protesters in London, Paris, Oslo, and other cities clashed with the police. Throughout the West Bank, daily demonstrations were held against the Israeli attacks. Some demonstrations developed to "violent" clashes between stone throwers and Israeli security forces. At least two Palestinians were killed by Israeli forces in the West Bank during protests against the offensive on Gaza: On 4 January, a man among a crowd in Qalqilya who clashed with Israeli forces was shot dead, while on 16 January, a teenager died after being shot in the head during a demonstration in Hebron. The Palestinian Center For Human Rights (PCHR) reported that between 15 January and 21, 36 January others, including 16 children, were wounded by Israeli forces in the West Bank in various protests against the offensive. There were global isolated attacks against Jewish and Israeli targets,. Over 300 Israeli websites were hacked and defaced with anti-Israeli and anti-US messages during the first days of the conflict. In France, anti-Jewish and anti-Muslim attacks spiked after 27 December. and similar increase in attacks happened in the United Kingdom and Sweden.

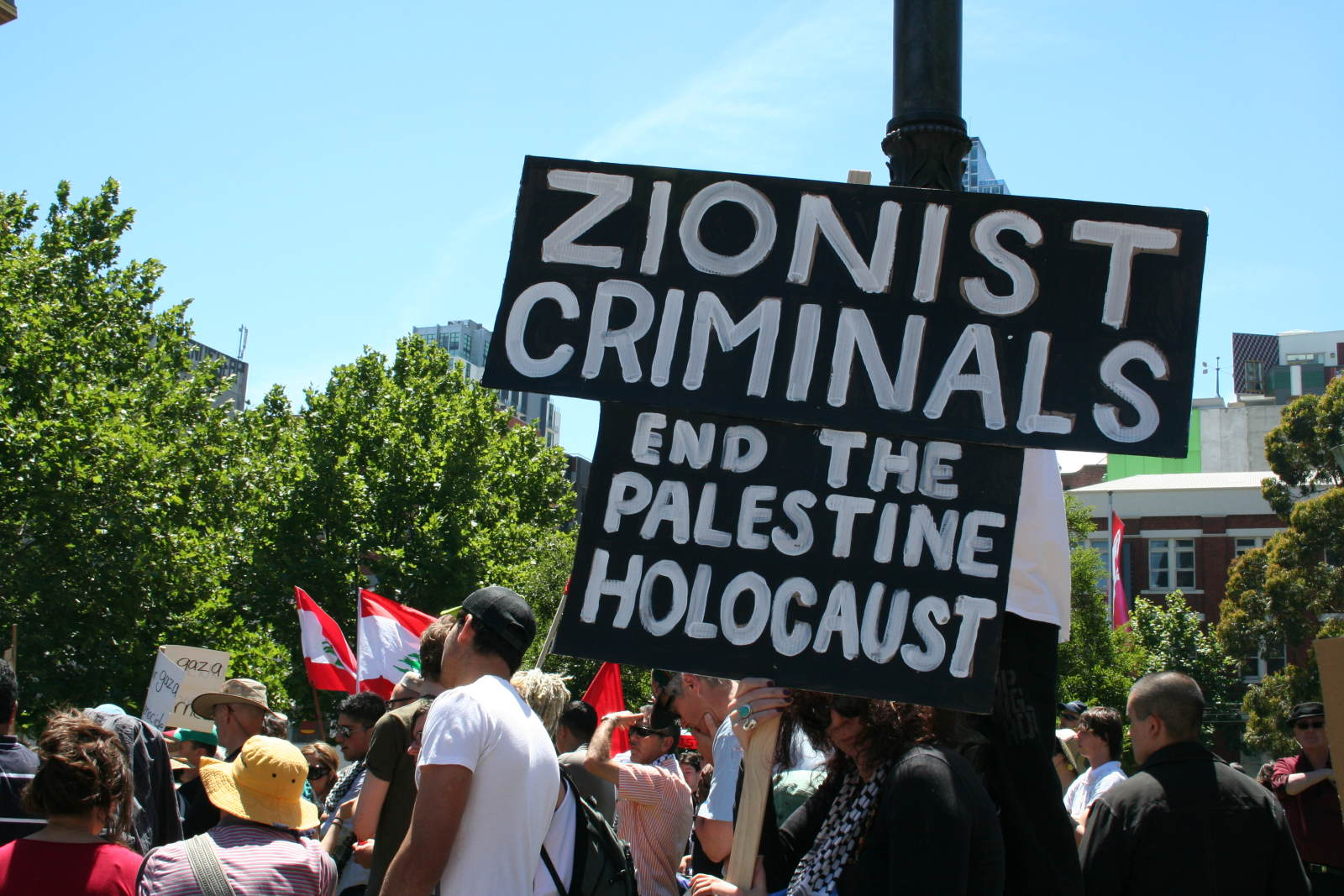
A rally against Israeli operations held in Melbourne, Australia.

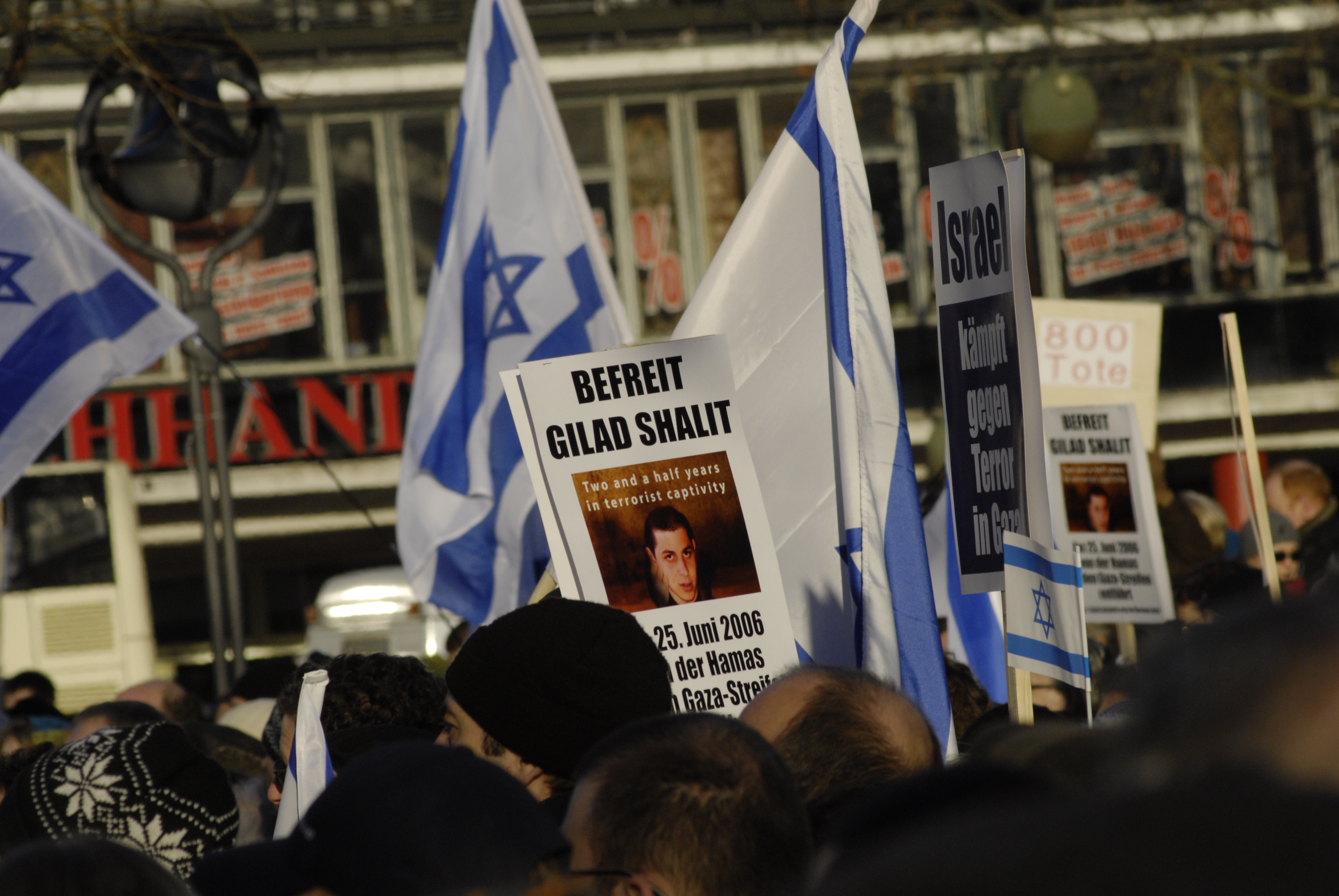
Pro-Israel demonstration in Berlin, Germany (11.01.2009).

On 10 January, a new wave of protests were held in Europe. In London, an estimated 100,000 people protested against the Israeli attacks. Further protests were held across Europe. Nearly 10,000 gathered in New York City on 11 January to support Israel. In the United States, a McClatchy / Ipsos poll showed that 44% of the general public favored the Israeli operation, while a CNN poll showed that 63% thought Israeli military operation was justified. CNN also reported that 75% of Republicans and 52% of Democrats held this view, though Newsweek found 55% of Republicans and 45% of Democrats approved of Israeli actions. In the Jewish community, the ADL showed that 79% felt the Israeli response was appropriate.

Many demonstrations against the strikes occurred in cities around the world, and in Israel protests both for and against the strikes were held. In Egypt, the protests caused the government to reopen the Rafah border crossing to allow the delivery of food and medicine to the Gaza Strip.

The largest protest, of up to a million people, was held at a government organised event in Damascus on 7 January. On 10 December, a new wave of protests were held in Europe. In London, 50,000 people marched to the Israeli embassy – the largest ever pro-Palestinian demonstration in the UK. In Paris 30,000 people marched with banners reading 'We are all children of Gaza'. Further protests were held across Europe.

The Israeli peace movement Gush Shalom condemned the war; they marched in Tel-Aviv in a massive demonstration.

=== Demonstrations condemning the Israeli offensive ===
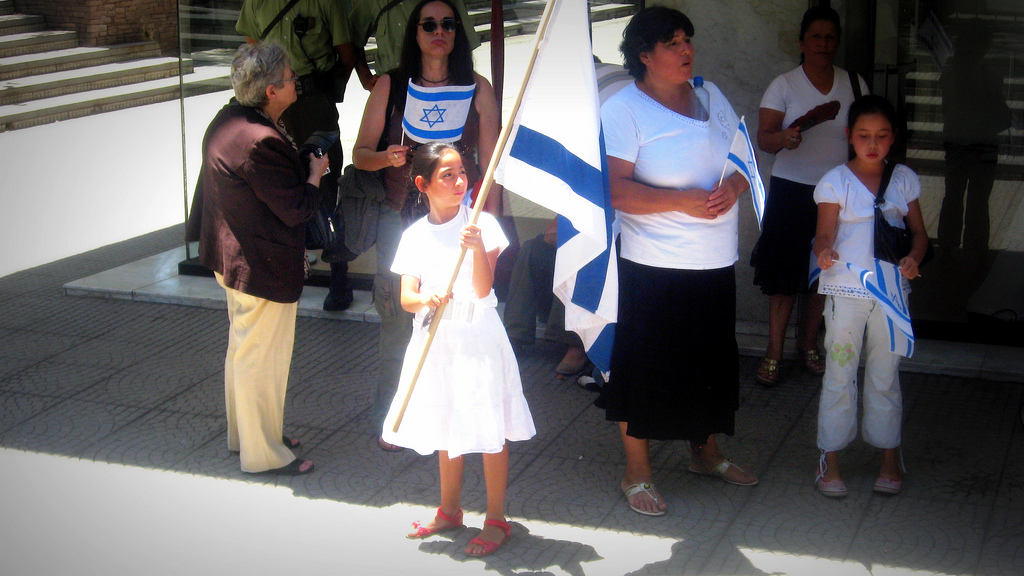
Israeli supporters in Santiago, Chile.

Protests were held in the following cities. A number of student 'sit-in's were also organised, calling upon university authorities to condemn the Israeli bombing of educational institutions in Gaza.

Note: The table can be sorted alphabetically or chronologically using the "><" icon. Size figures are according to police estimates. Other estimates are noted in the "Notes" box.

Demonstrations condemning the Israeli offensive
| Location | Country | Size | Notes |
|---|---|---|---|
| Aarhus | Denmark | 400 | |
| Abu Dhabi | UAE | 10,000 | Part of nationwide demonstrations organised by the Ministry of Interior on 9 January and attended by locals and expatriates. |
| Albuquerque | United States | | |
| Aleppo | Syria | 500 | |
| Algiers | Algeria | 100 | |
| Amman | Jordan | 30,000 | 1,500 protesters gathered in front of the Israeli embassy and police fired tear gas at several protesters hurling rocks; 30,000 at a stadium. |
| Amsterdam | Netherlands | 1,500 | |
| Anchorage | United States | | |
| Ankara | Turkey | 5,000 | |
| Ann Arbor | United States | | |
| Arish | Egypt | 3,000 | |
| Atlanta | United States | | |
| Athens | Greece | 5,000 | Riot police fired tear gas to stop protesters from hurling rocks at the Israeli Embassy. |
| Auckland | New Zealand | 1,000 | |
| Baghdad | Iraq | 1,000 | |
| Baltimore | United States | | |
| Bamako | Mali | | Several hundred marched in opposition to the attack on Gaza, ending with a prayer, on 2 January. |
| Bangor | United Kingdom | 100 | |
| Barcelona | Spain | 50,000 | |
| Barranquilla | Colombia | | |
| Baton Rouge | United States | 300 | |
| Beirut | Lebanon | 2,250 | 4 January: 250 at US embassy, "thousands" outside UN building. |
| Belfast | United Kingdom | 2,000 | Speech by Irish Nobel Prize laureate Mairead Corrigan Maguire, Lord Mayor of Belfast, heads of the four main churches in Ireland (cross-border) and trade union presidents, including NIPSA heads. The protest was boycotted by unionist political parties, most notably the DUP who claimed those attending the protest were anti-Israeli and pro-Hamas. Parts of two speeches were in Irish. Among the protestors were Palestinians and Israelis living in Belfast. |
| Bellingham | United States | | |
| Berlin | Germany | 7,000 | |
| Bern | Switzerland | 800 | |
| Bern | Switzerland | 7000 | |
| Bogotá | Colombia | 200 – 1,000 | On 31 December 2008, a protest was held in front of the Israeli embassy. On 2 January 2009, a march from Plaza de Bolívar to the Israeli embassy took place. Another demonstration took place on 6 January, from the Palestinian to the Israeli embassy, and yet another one on 16 January, which gathered around 1,000. |
| Bordeaux | France | 300 | |
| Boston | United States | 1,000 | |
| Bradford | United Kingdom | | |
| Brasília | Brazil | 100 | After marching from Cathedral of Brasília to the Israeli embassy, 100 protestors burned an Israeli Flag, and delivered a Manifesto to the embassy. |
| Brisbane | Australia | 2,000 | |
| Bristol | United Kingdom | | |
| Brussels 02, Jan | Belgium | 1,000 | 1,000 protestors according to the police, 3,000 according to the organisers. |
| Brussels 10, Jan | Belgium | 30,000 | 30,000 protestors according to the police, 50,000–60,000 according to the organisers. |
| Budapest | Hungary | 1,000 | |
| Buenos Aires | Argentina | 5,000 | |
| Buffalo | United States | | |
| Caernarfon | United Kingdom | | |
| Cairo | Egypt | 220,000 | About 220,000 people gathered in several places in Cairo near the Al Fatah Mosque, Lawyers Union, Doctors Union, Cairo University, Tahrir Square, Azhar Mosque and other places in Cairo to protest the ongoing Israeli attacks in Gaza and to get the Egyptian government to open the border between Gaza and Egypt it is considered one of the Biggest Protests in Cairo, the Government banned Major Protests in Cairo for Gaza. About 400 people gathered near the Al Fatah Mosque in Cairo to protest the ongoing Israeli attacks in Gaza and to get the Egyptian government to open the border between Gaza and Egypt. |
| Cambridge | United Kingdom | 100+ | Over 100 students occupied the law faculty of Cambridge University |
| Cape Town | South Africa | 3,000 | The protest was organised by the Workers International Vanguard League (WIVL) who released a statement saying the march was "to protest the genocide in Gaza as well as the complicity of the SA government in allowing weapons and spare parts to be shipped to Israel and the United States". Leaders of the protest handed a memorandum to Deputy Foreign Minister Sue van der Merwe outside Parliament's main gate which among other things calls on government to expel Israel's ambassador to South Africa, and for the imposition of sanctions against that country. |
| Caracas 02, Jan | Venezuela | 5,000 | |
| Charikar | Afghanistan | | |
| Chicago | United States | 4,050 | |
| Cincinnati | United States | | |
| Cleveland | United States | | |
| Cluj-Napoca | Romania | 200 | |
| Colorado Springs | United States | | |
| Columbia | United States | | |
| Concord | United States | | |
| Copenhagen | Denmark | 2,000; 7,000 | |
| Cork | Ireland | | |
| Dallas | United States | 900 | |
| Damascus | Syria | 1,000,000 | A number of demonstrations took place in Damascus, but the largest was on 8 January. Independent sources gave an estimate of "hundreds of thousands", while Syrian media placed the number at "roughly one million". The rally was sponsored by the government to protest Israel's military offensive against the Gaza Strip. |
| Dar es Salaam | Tanzania | 10,000 | |
| Dearborn | United States | 3,000 | |
| Denver | United States | | |
| Denizli | Turkey | | |
| Derry | United Kingdom | 600 | 3 January 2009. Like in Belfast, unionist parties refused to attend. Main speaker for the event was Councillor Gerry MacLochlainn (Sinn Féin), who called for a boycott of all Israeli good. He later proposed this to Derry City Council and it was adopted as Derry City Policy. |
| Derry | United Kingdom | 150 | 4 January 2009. See previous Derry protest |
| Dhaka | Bangladesh | | |
| Mogadishu | Somalia | | Thousands Somalis protested in Mogadishu on 9 January 2009, expressing their solidarity with the Palestinians and demanding that the Arab world take action |
| Diyarbakir | Turkey | 50,000 | The demonstrators chanted slogans against Israel both in Turkish and Kurdish. |
| Doha | Qatar | 15,000 | |
| Dubai | UAE | | Part of nationwide demonstrations organised by the Ministry of Interior on 9 January and attended by locals and expatriates. In Dubai, people were invited to take part in the marches via email and SMS messages, as well as by postings made on popular community websites like Facebook. |
| Dublin | Ireland | 1,000 | Israeli flag burned outside Leinster House, one man attempted to set himself on fire. |
| Duisburg | Germany | 10,000 | Demonstrators marching in solidarity with the victims in the Gaza Strip, called for an immediate end to the violence and a lifting of the blockade of Gaza. |
| Düsseldorf | Germany | 4,000 | |
| Dushanbe | Tajikistan | 2,000 | Not given permission to hold public protests, 2,000 Tajiks held a "meeting" to condemn Israeli actions. |
| Edinburgh | United Kingdom | | |
| Eugene, Oregon | United States | | |
| Exeter | United Kingdom | | |
| Flint | United States | | |
| Florianópolis | Brazil | | |
| Fort Lauderdale | United States | 100 | |
| Frankfurt | Germany | 5,000 | |
| Galway | Ireland | 250 | |
| Geneva | Switzerland | 1,000 | |
| Glasgow | United Kingdom | | |
| Granada | Spain | 200 | |
| Guayaquil | Ecuador | | |
| Hebron | (Palestine) West Bank | | |
| Haifa | Israel | 100 | Students protested at the University of Haifa. |
| Hartford | United States | 150 | |
| Honolulu | United States | | |
| Houston | United States | 500 | |
| Hyderabad | India | 250 | Attempts to burn Olmert in effigy were prevented |
| Karbala | Iraq | 200 | Around 200 people attended the protests at the majority Shiite Shrine City of Karbala. |
| Hull | United Kingdom | | |
| Islamabad–Rawalpindi | Pakistan | | |
| Istanbul | Turkey | 200,000 | Around 200,000 people attended the protests at Caglayan square in central Istanbul. Organisers put the figure at 700,000. |
| Jakarta | Indonesia | 10,000; 20,000 (10–01–09) | |
| Jalalabad | Afghanistan | | |
| Jerusalem | Israel | 200 | Arab Israeli and Jewish students protested at the Hebrew University. |
| Johannesburg | South Africa | | |
| Kabul | Afghanistan | | |
| Kalamazoo | United States | | |
| Kayseri | Turkey | | |
| Khartoum | Sudan | | |
| Kolkata | India | | |
| Knoxville | United States | | |
| Kota Bharu | Malaysia | 1,000 | |
| Kuwait City | Kuwait | 2,000 | |
| Lahore | Pakistan | | |
| Leeds | United Kingdom | | |
| Lima | Peru | | |
| Limerick | Ireland | | |
| Liverpool | United Kingdom | | |
| London | Canada | 300 | |
| London | United Kingdom | 12,000 | 3 January: First major protest organised by the Stop the War Coalition. Armed police had to protect the Israeli embassy from a crowd of over 5000 people. Protesters threw shoes at government buildings. Among the protesters were politicians Clare Short, Tony Benn and George Galloway, comedian Alexei Sayle and musician Annie Lennox. Another protest on 17 January attracted 3,500 peoples including notable Labour party MPs. |
| London | United Kingdom | 50,000 | 10 January: Second major protest organised by the Stop the War Coalition. Further clashes outside the Israeli and Egyptian embassies. |
| Los Angeles | United States | 350 | Protestors demonstrated peacefully near the Israeli Consulate. A separate demonstration in Westwood was attended by around 100. |
| Louisville | United States | | |
| Lyon | France | 300 | |
| Madrid | Spain | 250,000 | According to the organisers. |
| Makhachkala | Russia | 10,000 | |
| Malmö | Sweden | | |
| Manama | Bahrain | 2,500 | |
| Manchester | United Kingdom | | |
| Managua | Nicaragua | | |
| Manaus | Brazil | | |
| Manila | Philippines | | |
| Melbourne | Australia | 6,000 | |
| Milan | Italy | 1,000 | |
| Minneapolis | United States | 40 | |
| Modesto | United States | | |
| Mombasa | Kenya | | |
| Montpellier | France | 300 | |
| Montreal | Canada | 5,000 | About 5,000 people, according to media estimates, braved the cold on 4 January to "demand a halt to Israel's offensive on the Gaza Strip". |
| Moscow | Russia | 37 | The protest by 37 Palestinians, Azeris and Russian Muslims was not sanctioned, and they were subsequently detained. On 15 January, another protest was held in front of the Israeli embassy, attended by members of the Communist Party of the Russian Federation |
| Mosul | Iraq | | The protest was targeted by a suicide bomber, killing 1 and wounding 16. |
| Munich | Germany | 2,000 | |
| Nairobi | Kenya | | |
| Nancy | France | 300 | |
| Nantes | France | 700 | |
| Nardaran | Azerbaijan | | Several hundred gathered at this village near Baku. |
| New Brunswick | United States | | |
| Newcastle | United Kingdom | | |
| New Delhi | India | 50 | On 5 January, 50 students from Delhi University and JNU demonstrated in front of the Israeli Embassy. |
| New Haven | United States | | |
| New Orleans | United States | 1,300 | |
| New York City | United States | 22,000 | |
| Nice | France | 200 | |
| Nicosia | Cyprus | 2,000 | Demonstrators pelted riot police with rocks, sticks, shoes and oranges near the Israeli Embassy. |
| Norfolk | United States | | |
| Norwich | United Kingdom | | |
| Nouakchott | Mauritania | | |
| Novi Pazar | Serbia | | A few thousand protesters in the predominantly Muslim south protested against Israeli operation. Humanitarian aid was also collected. |
| Ocala | United States | | |
| Odense | Denmark | 500 | |
| Vancouver | Canada | 1500 | |
| Oslo | Norway | 40,000 | 1000 protested on 29 December outside Israeli embassy. Protest turned violent when 100 began throwing Molotov cocktails, stones and fired fireworks, 4 were arrested. Several thousand peacefully protested outside Israeli embassy on 3 January. The Blitz movement and Palestine Committee protested on 4 January outside the Israeli embassy. Protest turned violent, and police dispersed the protest using tear gas, after deeming it illegal. On 8 January, a counter-protest was held by pro-Palestinian supporters in response to the pro-Israeli demonstration outside the Storting. Protest turned violent and the police dispersed the protest using tear gas. On 8 January, 40000 gathered to protest against the use of force in the conflict. Similar demonstrations were held all around the country. On 10 January, a group of Palestinian protesters demonstrated outside the Israeli embassy. Among the protesters were several children age 11 and 12, walking in front of the rally. The protest turned violent when they began throwing rocks, Molotov cocktails and fired rockets at the police. Police dispersed the protest using tear gas. After 130 had been detained and 5 arrested, protesters vandalised several McDonald's restaurants after due to rumours spread by text messages said that the fast food chain were planning to donate their earnings on Saturday to Israel. The rumours, however, were false. |
| Ottawa | Canada | 300 | Estimate of 500 protesters was also given. Organised by Palestinian and Jewish Canadians. |
| Oxford | United Kingdom | approx 650 | 17 January: Protesters march through city centre to Bonn Square. On 22 January, 40–100 students sat-down at Oxford University demanding a statement condemning Israel's attack on Gaza. |
| Panama City | Panama | 200 | Protesters gathered outside Israeli embassy. |
| Paris | France | 21,000; Tens of thousands (10–01–09) | After the main demonstration of 21,000, a group of 500 protesters burned Israeli flags, set fire to at least 3 cars and smashed shop and cafe windows. |
| Philadelphia | United States | | |
| Phoenix | United States | | |
| Portland | United States | | |
| Portsmouth | United Kingdom | 500 | |
| Portsmouth | United States | | |
| Prague | Czech Republic | | |
| Qalqilya | (Palestine) West Bank | | A Palestinian man was shot dead by Israeli troops who confronted youths protesting against the Israeli operation. |
| Quito | Ecuador | | |
| Rabat | Morocco | 50,000 | 4 January: 50,000 |
| Ramallah | (Palestine) West Bank | 2,000 | "Thousands" demonstrated on 27 December. Israeli troops shot dead a protester who was throwing stones. |
| Rochester | United States | | |
| Rome | Italy | 12,000 – 15,000 | |
| Rio de Janeiro | Brazil | 300 | |
| Thessaloniki | Greece | 700 | |
| Sacramento | United States | | |
| Sarajevo | Bosnia | 2,500 | |
| Sakhnin | Israel | 150,000 | Estimates: 10,000, greater than 10,000, and 150,000. |
| Salvador | Brazil | | |
| Salzburg | Austria | 2,500 | |
| San Diego | United States | 500 | |
| San Francisco | United States | 10,000 | |
| San Jose | United States | | |
| Sana'a | Yemen | 10,000 | Tens of thousands of people marched, many carrying banners condemning Israel and what they called "Arab silence" over the "extermination of the Palestinian people by the Zionist enemy". |
| Santa Rosa | United States | | |
| Santiago | Chile | 500 | |
| São Paulo | Brazil | 7,000 | On 11, 7 January 000 protestors gathered outside the São Paulo Museum of Art for a march. On 2 January 200 protestors gathered outside the same space. On 7 January, a protest gathered 1,500 people in Brás, a neighbourhood famed for its large Arab Brazilian population. |
| Sde Dov | Israel | 21 | |
| Seattle | United States | | |
| Seoul | South Korea | 300 | |
| Seville | Spain | 3,000 | |
| Sharjah | United Arab Emirates | 3,000+ | Part of nationwide demonstrations organised by the Ministry of Interior on 9 January and attended by locals and expatriates. |
| Sheffield | United Kingdom | | |
| Sidon | Lebanon | 3,000 | |
| Sioux Falls | United States | | |
| Sligo | Ireland | | |
| Sofia | Bulgaria | 500 | While carrying pro-Palestinian banners, protests called for peace. |
| Srinagar | India | | |
| Stockholm | Sweden | | |
| Surabaya | Indonesia | | |
| Swansea | United Kingdom | 200 | |
| Sydney | Australia | 4,000 | |
| Syracuse | United States | | |
| Tacoma | United States | | |
| Tampa | United States | | |
| Tehran | Iran | 6,000 | |
| Thessaloniki | Greece | 1,000 | |
| Tel Aviv | Israel | 10,000 | About 200 students protested at Tel Aviv University in one protest, 10,000 people protested there in another. |
| Tokyo | Japan | 200 | Protesting Israeli attacks, and chanting "end the massacre in Gaza", protesters carried flowers and candles to the Israeli embassy, offered prayers and a Buddhist monk rang a bell for the victims. |
| Toronto | Canada | 2,000 | The first protest, held on 28 December, attracted 800 people, while a 3 January protest counted 2,000 demonstrators. A 7 January sit-in protest by 8 Jewish women inside the Israeli consulate, who did "not want this massacre to take place in our name", resulted in their arrest and subsequent release without charge. |
| Toulouse | France | 300 | |
| Tucumán | Argentina | 100 | |
| Tunbridge Wells | United Kingdom | | |
| Turin | Italy | 1,000 | |
| Umm al-Fahm | Israel | | During the demonstration one of the protesters fired random gunshots and hit two children lightly injuring them. |
| Uppsala | Sweden | 300 | |
| Vienna | Austria | 5,000 | Demonstration against Israel largely peaceful. |
| Washington, D.C. | United States | 10,000 | |
| Wellington | New Zealand | 1,000 | Demonstration on 6 January of est1000 people. Catholic priest defaces memorial to Yitzhak Rabin with red ink and blood. |
| York | United Kingdom | | |
| Youngstown | United States | | |
| Zagreb | Croatia | 300 | |
| Zürich | Switzerland | 600 | The president of the Swiss foreign policy commission also participated as a private citizen. |

=== Demonstrations supporting Israel ===
Note: The table can be sorted alphabetically or chronologically using the "><" icon.

Demonstrations supporting Israel
| Location | Country | Size | Notes |
|---|---|---|---|
| Albuquerque | United States | 200 | |
| Antwerp | Belgium | 800 | Protest for the support of Israel organised by the Jewish community of Antwerp. |
| Berlin | Germany | | Combined with Frankfurt and Munich, pro-Israeli rallies numbered at 2,000 protesters. |
| Bogotá | Colombia | | A pro-Israeli rally was held outside the Israeli Embassy in Colombia where crowds gathered to express their support for Israel's operation. |
| Boston | United States | | |
| Brussels | Belgium | 450–1,000 | 450 protestors according to the police, almost 1000 according to the organisers. |
| Buenos Aires | Argentina | 1,500 | Organised by the local Jewish community and several NGOs "in support of Israel but regretting innocent deaths". |
| Chişinău | Moldova | 150 | |
| Fort Lauderdale | United States | 250 | Counterprotest |
| Frankfurt | Germany | 500 | |
| Haifa | Israel | 200 | Students counterprotested at Haifa University, supporting the operation. |
| Harlem | United States | 1,000 | 1,000 Christian worshipers led by Bishop Carlton Brown pray for Israel. Israel's consul-general in New York reads out Gilad Shalit's children's story. |
| Helsinki | Finland | 700 | A pro-war demonstration organised by the Pentecostal Christian organisation The Friends of Israel. |
| Houston | United States | 100 | Counterprotest |
| Jerusalem | Israel | 500 | 100 students counterprotested at the Hebrew University, supporting the operation. Several hundred people prayed for the wellbeing of IDF soldiers and the residents of Israel's southern communities at the Western Wall. |
| Los Angeles | United States | 2,500 | |
| London 07/Jan/09 | United Kingdom | 1,000 | 1,000 people gathered at the Israeli embassy |
| London 11/Jan/09 | United Kingdom | 4,000 | Under the banner 'Peace in Israel, Peace in Gaza’, organisers estimated 15,000 were present. |
| London 15/Jan/09 | United Kingdom | 500 | Activists gathered outside the Iranian Embassy. |
| Madrid 18/Jan/09 | Spain | 3,000 | According to the organisers. |
| Malmö | Sweden | 700 | Protestors gathered to support Israel were pelted with eggs and bottles, then dispersed by police. |
| Manchester | United Kingdom | 2,000 | |
| Marseille | France | 4,000 | Thousand of people express their support to the Israeli action in Gaza. They denounce the use of civilians as "humans shield" by the Hamas. Organisers claim up to 20,000 attended the demonstration. |
| Melbourne | Australia | 5,000 | |
| Mexico City 09/Jan/09 | Mexico | 800 | |
| Mexico City 11/Jan/09 | Mexico | 1,000 | |
| Miami Beach | United States | 1,000 | |
| Munich | Germany | 1,500 | |
| Nashville | United States | 30 | Counterprotest |
| New York City | United States | | |
| Odesa | Ukraine | | Local Jews held a pro-Israel rally on the street in front of the Jewish Cultural Center. |
| Oslo | Norway | 300 | A 8 January protest by 300 people peacefully supported "Israel's right to defend themselves" outside the Storting was attended by FrP party chairwoman Siv Jensen and KrF politician Ingebrigt Sørfonn, and well protected by 200 policemen. The demonstration ended when fighting erupted between anti-Israeli demonstrators and police resulting in 20 arrests. |
| Paris | France | 4,000 | According to organisers, about 12,000 demonstrators gathered. |
| Phoenix | United States | 2,000 | |
| Prague | Czech Republic | 200 | |
| San Francisco | United States | | |
| San Salvador | El Salvador | 180 | Outside the Israeli embassy. Supporting people of Israel "in their reaction in legitimate defense and telling them we want peace for both sides". Protesters also demanded the release of Gilad Shalit. |
| Santiago | Chile | 300 | |
| São Paulo | Brazil | 3,000 | Held at the Latin American Memorial in São Paulo. |
| Temecula, California | United States | 100 | A small rally was held on 23 January. |
| The Hague | Netherlands | 500 | Pro-Israel demonstration in front of the Dutch parliament, organised by the Center for Information and Documentation of Israel and Christians for Israel. |
| Tel Aviv | Israel | 100 | Students counterprotested at Tel Aviv University, supporting the operation. |
| Toronto | Canada | 5,000 | On 4 January 100 counter-protestors rallied outside the Israeli consulate in support of the operation. On 8, 5 January 000 gathered at the Beth Tzedek Synagogue. |
| Tucson | United States | 500 | |
| Winnipeg | Canada | 800 | |

=== Demonstrations calling for peace ===
Demonstrations calling for peace
| Location | Country | Size | Notes |
|---|---|---|---|
| Bergen | Norway | 3,000 | |
| Bodø | Norway | 200 | Two demonstrations, both drawing between 150 and 200 people, with political and religious leaders calling for an end to the violence. |
| Oslo | Norway | 40,000 | A torch march for peace was held through the streets of Oslo, beginning at Youngstorget and ending outside Oslo city hall. All political parties were invited (from the leftist Rødt to the right-wing FrP), along with Oslo bishop Ole Christian Kvarme, LO leader Roar Flåthen, Liberal politician Abid Raja and head of CARE Marte Gerhardsen. Organisers include several trade unions, sport clubs and human rights organisations. |
| Stavanger | Norway | | |
| Tromsø | Norway | | |
| Trondheim | Norway | | |
| Voss | Norway | 300 | |
| Belgrade | Serbia | 300 | |

== Artists' response ==
=== Songs ===
- In January 2009 Syrian-American singer-songwriter Michael Heart composed and released a song in support of the Palestinian civilian victims of the Israeli war in Gaza, titled "We Will Not Go Down (Song For Gaza)", which gained popularity on sites like YouTube, internet blogs and forums. The official YouTube video of the song was viewed over 1 million times within a month of its release; the recording of the song was broadcast on radio and television in many countries along with blogs and websites worldwide and it was chanted in many demonstrations in cities ranging from Sydney, Australia to London, England. The Palestine Argentine Delegation Embassy website also put the song with lyrics on its page. Heart made the mp3 of the song freely downloadable from his official website, which he reports has been downloaded over 500,000 times, encouraging the listeners to make a donation to UN Relief and Works Agency for Palestine Refugees (UNRWA). Though musically praised around the world, the song received some political criticism from the Israeli camp.

=== Theatre plays ===
- Seven Jewish Children: A Play for Gaza is a controversial six-page, 10-minute play by British playwright and a co-patron of the Palestine Solidarity Campaign Caryl Churchill, written in response to the Gaza War, and first performed at London's Royal Court Theatre on 6 February 2009. Churchill has said that anyone wishing to produce it may do so gratis, so long as they hold a collection for the people of Gaza at the end. consists of seven scenes spread over roughly seventy years, in which Jewish adults discuss what, or whether, their children should be told about certain events in recent Jewish history that the play alludes to only indirectly.

Short plays written in response to Seven Jewish Children

- Seven Palestinian Children by Deb Margolin.
- Seven Other Children by Richard Stirling.
- What Strong Fences Make by The New York playwright Israel Horovitz who argues "another voice needed to be heard" against Churchill's play, that he claims as "offensive, distorted and manipulative".

== See also ==
- 2008–2009 Gaza Strip aid
- Antisemitic incidents occurring during the 2008–2009 Israel–Gaza conflict
- International reactions to the Gaza flotilla raid
