= Seven Jewish Children =

2009 play written by Caryl Churchill

Seven Jewish Children: A Play for Gaza is a six-page, 10-minute play by British playwright Caryl Churchill, written in response to the 2008-2009 Israel military strike on Gaza, and first performed at London's Royal Court Theatre on 6 February 2009. Churchill, a patron of the Palestine Solidarity Campaign, has said that anyone wishing to produce it may do so gratis, so long as they hold a collection for the people of Gaza at the end.

The play consists of seven scenes spread over roughly seventy years, in which Jewish adults discuss what, or whether, their children should be told about certain events in recent Jewish history that the play alludes to only indirectly, beginning with the Holocaust and continuing with the Israeli-Arab conflict.

The play has been criticized by many as antisemitic. The Board of Deputies of British Jews has criticized it as both "horrifically anti-Semitic" and "beyond the boundaries of reasonable political discourse", while Jeffrey Goldberg of The Atlantic called the play a blood libel and "the mainstreaming of the worst anti-Jewish stereotypes". Other commentators, such as Charlotte Higgins of The Guardian and Tony Kushner and Alisa Solomon writing in The Nation, have emphatically defended the play from these accusations.

== Description ==
The play takes the form of a litany, repeating the phrases "Tell her", "Don't tell her" to reflect an ostensible tension within Israel and the Jewish community over how to describe events in the Israeli–Palestinian conflict: "Tell her for miles and miles all round they have lands of their own/Tell her again this is our promised land/Don't tell her they said it was a land without people/Don't tell her I wouldn't have come if I'd known/Tell her maybe we can share/Don't tell her that." Churchill has been particularly criticized for a monologue within the play purportedly representing a hardline Israeli view: "tell her I look at one of their children covered in blood and what do I feel? tell her all I feel is happy it's not her/Don't tell her that."

The play is based around the increasingly urgent repetition of "Tell her," and "Don't tell her". Occasionally breaking into this pattern is the injunction "don't frighten her", three significant words that are also the last in the play.

These motifs can be seen in the opening lines of the play:

Tell her it’s a game
Tell her it’s serious
But don’t frighten her

Don’t tell her they’ll kill her

Although Churchill indicates that the scenes concern different children, thus speakers change between them, she leaves it for each production to decide how many adults take part and how the lines are shared between them. The Guardian, for example, has produced a version with Jennie Stoller that is a simple monologue throughout.

The first two scenes concern the Holocaust, featuring one family that is hiding from Nazis and another wondering how to tell their child of the many family members who have been killed. Later scenes are about episodes in the development of the Israeli–Arab conflict: one family is migrating to Jerusalem; another wonders what to tell their daughter about Palestinian Arabs; the next discusses an Israeli victory; and the next is speaking as the Israeli West Bank barrier is being built and when a Palestinian child has been shot. The culminating scene is during the 2008–2009 Israel–Gaza conflict.

=== Mission ===
Churchill has said she sees the play as a political event. Anyone wishing to produce it may do so for free so long as they take a collection for the people of Gaza after the performance, with proceeds to be sent to Medical Aid for Palestinians, a British medical aid and political advocacy organization. She also made the script of the play available as a downloadable PDF on the website of the Royal Court Theatre. A one-woman video performance of the play is also available online from The Guardian's website.

== Reception ==
=== Praise ===
The Guardian theatre critic Michael Billington awarded the play four of five stars and wrote that the play captures his belief that "security has become the pretext for indiscriminate slaughter." The journalist Robert Mackey wrote that "Mr. Billington’s sympathetic review describes the context of the cryptic play and points to some of the lines from the script that have disturbed readers like Mr. Goldberg." The Times's Dominic Maxwell also awarded the play four of five stars and praised it for an "impassioned response to the events in Gaza that is elliptical, empathetic and illuminating". In the Saudi Arabian English-language publication Saudi Gazette, London-based freelance journalist Susannah Tarbush wrote that the play "succinctly dramatizes the tragedies and ironies of history for both sides" and builds to what she calls "a devastating final scene set during the Gaza onslaught".

Noting comments by the Board of Deputies of British Jews that critiqued the play as antisemitic, award-winning dramatist and essayist Tony Kushner and academic journalist and critic Alisa Solomon, both Jewish American critics of modern Israeli politics, wrote in The Nation that:

"We emphatically disagree. We think Churchill's play should be seen and discussed as widely as possible... To see anti-Semitism here is to construe erroneously the words spoken by the worst of Churchill's characters as a statement from the playwright about all Jews as preternaturally filled with a viciousness unique among humankind. But to do this is, again, to distort what Churchill wrote."

Charlotte Higgins, The Guardian's chief arts writer, defended the work by writing:

The play did not strike me as antisemitic.... I cleave strongly to the view that it is possible to be critical of Israel without being antisemitic, and I do not believe that Churchill is making or otherwise implying universal claims about the Jewish people in this play.

=== Criticism ===
Condemning the play for its "straitjacketed political orthodoxy", Christopher Hart of The Sunday Times criticized Churchill's "ludicrous and utterly predictable lack of even-handedness" that is typical, he said, of the "enclosed, fetid, smug, self-congratulating and entirely irrelevant little world of contemporary political theatre". Theatre critic Jan Dalley of the Financial Times described the play as "agitprop" harking back to long-discredited revolutionary ideas; this negative assessment was echoed by Bret Stephens's criticism in The Wall Street Journal, and by Susannah Clapp's criticism in The Observer. Jeffrey Goldberg of The Atlantic also called the play a blood libel and said that "the mainstreaming of the worst anti-Jewish stereotypes – for instance, that Jews glory in the shedding of non-Jewish blood – is upon us". Columnist Melanie Phillips wrote that the play is "an open vilification of the Jewish people ... drawing upon an atavistic hatred of the Jews" and called it an "open incitement to hatred". Patrick Healy from The New York Times wrote that the play "at times paints heartless images of Israelis."

The Board of Deputies of British Jews, invited to preview the play, accused Churchill of being "Anti-Israel". Jonathan Hoffman, co-vice chairman of the Zionist Federation of Great Britain and Ireland, called the play "a libellous and despicable demonisation of Israeli parents and grandparents" and expressed fear that it would "stoke the fires of antisemitism". He added that the play is a modern blood libel drawing on old antisemitic myths.

A letter from 59 well-known British Jews was published in the Daily Telegraph claiming that Seven Jewish Children reinforces "false stereotypes" and demonises Israel by depicting Israelis as "inhuman triumphalists" who teach their children "Arabs must be hated", and further that it is "historically inaccurate" since it "fails to say that the Six-Day War was a defensive war" and doesn't contain Israel's "withdrawal from Gaza in 2005" or the "more than 6,000 rockets" launched indiscriminately by Hamas. Signatories included Professor Geoffrey Alderman, the Michael Gross Professor of Modern History at the University of Buckingham; Maureen Lipman, the actress; Ronald Harwood, the Oscar-winning screenwriter; and the actress Tracy-Ann Oberman.

Playwright Israel Horovitz, who wrote a play in response to Churchill entitled What Strong Fences Make, argued that while it is possible to criticize Israel without being antisemitic and to criticize Palestine without being anti-Arab: "Those who criticize Jews in the name of criticizing Israel, as Ms. Churchill seems to have done in her play, step over an unacceptable boundary and must be taken to task."

The Independent has pointed out that the play does not include the words "Israel" or "Zionist" but does reference "Jews" in several places.

==== Royal Court Theatre ====
John Nathan writing for The Jewish Chronicle, though finding the play theatrically beautiful, criticized the play as antisemitic and The Royal Court Theatre's artistic director, Dominic Cooke for not following National Theatre's director Nicholas Hytner's policy that a play that is entirely populated by, and is critical of, a religious minority, can only be staged at the National Theatre if it is written by a member of that minority. Further criticism centred on associate director of the Royal Court Theatre, Ramin Gray's interview, in which he said that he [as a director] "would think twice" about staging a play "very critical of Islam, or [which] depicted Mohammed" since "given the times we're in" he would worry that if he "cause[d] offence then the whole enterprise would become buried in a sea of controversy" while the theatre did stage a play such as Seven Jewish Children that is critical of some Israeli Jews and politics. Jonathan Romain argued that, "Assuming that Ramin Gray is an honourable person (as I am happy to do) and that he is not guilty of hypocrisy by favouring the mosque over the synagogue, there can be only one explanation for his reluctance: fear".

The theatre admitted the play was critical of Israel but denied this meant that it was antisemitic against "some concerns". A spokesman argued "in keeping with its philosophy" the theatre presents "a multiplicity of viewpoints". He gave example of their 2 plays staged along Seven Jewish Children [at that time]: The Stone that "asks very difficult questions about the refusal of some modern Germans to accept their ancestors' complicity in Nazi atrocities" running before Seven Jewish Children with Shades "set in contemporary London which explores issues of tolerance in the Muslim community" staging at their smaller studio theatre. Spokesman said:

"We categorically reject that accusation and furthermore would urge people to see this play before they judge it. While Seven Jewish Children is undoubtedly critical of the policies of the state of Israel, there is no suggestion that this should be read as a criticism of Jewish people. It is possible to criticise the actions of Israel without being anti-Semitic."

=== Churchill's defence of the play ===
Writing in response to an article by Howard Jacobson which sought to place Seven Jewish Children and other criticism of Israel in the context of a rise in anti-Semitism, Churchill defended herself: "Howard Jacobson writes as if there’s something new about describing critics of Israel as anti-Semitic. But it’s the usual tactic. We are not going to agree about politics … But we should be able to disagree without accusations of anti-Semitism." The play was about the difficulties of explaining violence to children. Its length meant favourable and unfavourable information about Israel had been omitted, she said.

Howard Jacobson seems to see the play from a very particular perspective so that everything is twisted. The characters are "covert and deceitful", they are constructing a "parallel hell" to Hitler’s Europe, they are "monsters who kill babies by design". I don’t recognise the play from that description. ...

Throughout the play, families try to protect children. Finally, one of the parents explodes, saying, "No, stop preventing her from knowing what’s on the TV news". His outburst is meant, in a small way, to shock during a shocking situation. Is it worse than a picture of Israelis dancing for joy as smoke rises over Gaza? Or the text of Rabbi Shloyo Aviner's booklet distributed to soldiers saying cruelty is sometimes a good attribute?...

Finally, the blood libel. I find it extraordinary that, because the play talks about the killing of children in Gaza, I am accused of reviving the medieval blood libel that Jews killed Christian children and consumed their blood. The character is not "rejoicing in the murder of little children". He sees dead children on television and feels numb and defiant in his relief that his own child is safe. He believes that what has happened is justified as self-defence. Howard Jacobson may agree. I don’t, but it doesn’t make either of them a monster, or me anti-Semitic.

== Productions ==
=== Royal Court Theatre production ===
The cast for the play's premier production in February 2009 at London's Royal Court Theatre consisted of Ben Caplan, Jack Chissick, David Horovitch, Daisy Lewis, Ruth Posner, Samuel Roukin, Jennie Stoller, Susannah Wise, and Alexis Zegerman. Susannah Tarbush argued "that most, if not all, the actors are Jewish." The play was directed by Dominic Cooke who is Jewish himself. Some of the original cast gave a performance of the play introduced by Churchill herself as part of the Two Plays for Gaza fund-raising event at the Hackney Empire on 21 May 2009.

At the Royal Court the play was staged following Marius von Mayenburg's The Stone, a play about a German family who live in a house taken from vanished Jews and who grapple with the Nazi past of their family and nation.

=== Other productions ===
A copy of the play was sent to the BBC. Jeremy Howe, the commissioning drama editor for Radio 4, said that both he and Mark Damazer, the channel's controller, considered the play a "brilliant piece", but agreed that it could not be broadcast because of the BBC's policy of editorial impartiality.

The first staged reading of the play in New York City took place on 16 March 2009 at the Brecht Forum and featured Broadway actress Kathleen Chalfant.

A rehearsed reading took place at the State Library of Victoria in Melbourne on 18 May 2009 at a fund-raising event for Australians for Palestine. As a result of her participation, the Jewish actress Miriam Margolyes had an invitation withdrawn to perform in front of residents at a home run by the Australian Jewish Care.

A Hebrew translation of the play was staged in Tel Aviv on 11 June 2009. It was directed online via Skype and video by Samieh Jabbarin, who has been under house arrest for four months. The play was also performed at the American University in Cairo, Egypt, directed by a Palestinian student as part of an advanced directing class.

In May 2009, the city of Liverpool withdrew public funding from a theatre festival that had scheduled Seven Jewish Children after the producers refused to also perform another play, Seven Other Children by Richard Stirling of Evergreen Theatrical Productions. Development coordinator for the festival Madeline Heneghan remarked that since the program was "planned months in advance" the request was "unrealistic at this point".

The Rude Guerrilla Theatre Co. of Orange County, California, announced that it will be producing the play. The New York Theatre Workshop and the Public Theater are said to be considering a New York City production. Both of them have performed plays by Churchill before.

Canadian group Independent Jewish Voices sponsored the play's Canadian premiere in Montreal with 3 performances.

Gustavus Adolphus College ran the show for 2 weekends from 30 October 2009 to 7 November 2009. It was performed after another one of Caryl Churchill's plays Far Away, as well as a response to this play called Seven Palestinian Children by Deb Margolin.

On 30 November 2009, the play was performed in the Lebanese American University in Beirut, Lebanon. The play was staged by a Lebanese student, Fuad Halwani as part of a Play Production course. Due to its success the play was performed again twice in the university campus, once on 26 March in celebration of World Theatre Day and again on 21 April as part of an Arab Popular Culture seminar. The play also participated and was performed in the University Theatre Festival in Fes, Morocco in April 2010.

== Plays produced in response ==
On 25 March 2009 Theater J and Forum Theatre in Washington, D.C., followed their readings with a reading of Seven Palestinian Children a response by Deb Margolin; the script is available online. The performance also included a reading of "The Eighth Child" by Robbie Gringras.

London's New End Theatre produced Seven Other Children, a new play by Richard Stirling.

The New York playwright Israel Horovitz wrote a new short play entitled What Strong Fences Make, arguing "another voice needed to be heard" against Churchill's play, that he claims as "offensive, distorted and manipulative". Horovitz has offered to allow any theatre that wishes to produce What Strong Fences Make free of royalties, as long as a collection is taken up following all performances for the benefit of ONE Family Fund, a charity that assists children wounded in attacks on Israel.

== See also ==
- International reaction to the 2008–2009 Israel–Gaza conflict
- My Name Is Rachel Corrie
- The Siege (play)
