= Robbie Gringras =

Robbie Gringras (Hebrew: רובי גרינגרס) is a British-born Israeli living in the Galilee, working in education, performance, and writing.

Since emigrating to Israel with a Literature degree from Oxford University and a teaching qualification, as well as his own theater company, he has worked to train many Israeli educators.

He is a successful international theatre artist, whose original plays have performed globally and on the West End, in English, Hebrew, and Spanish (Mexico).

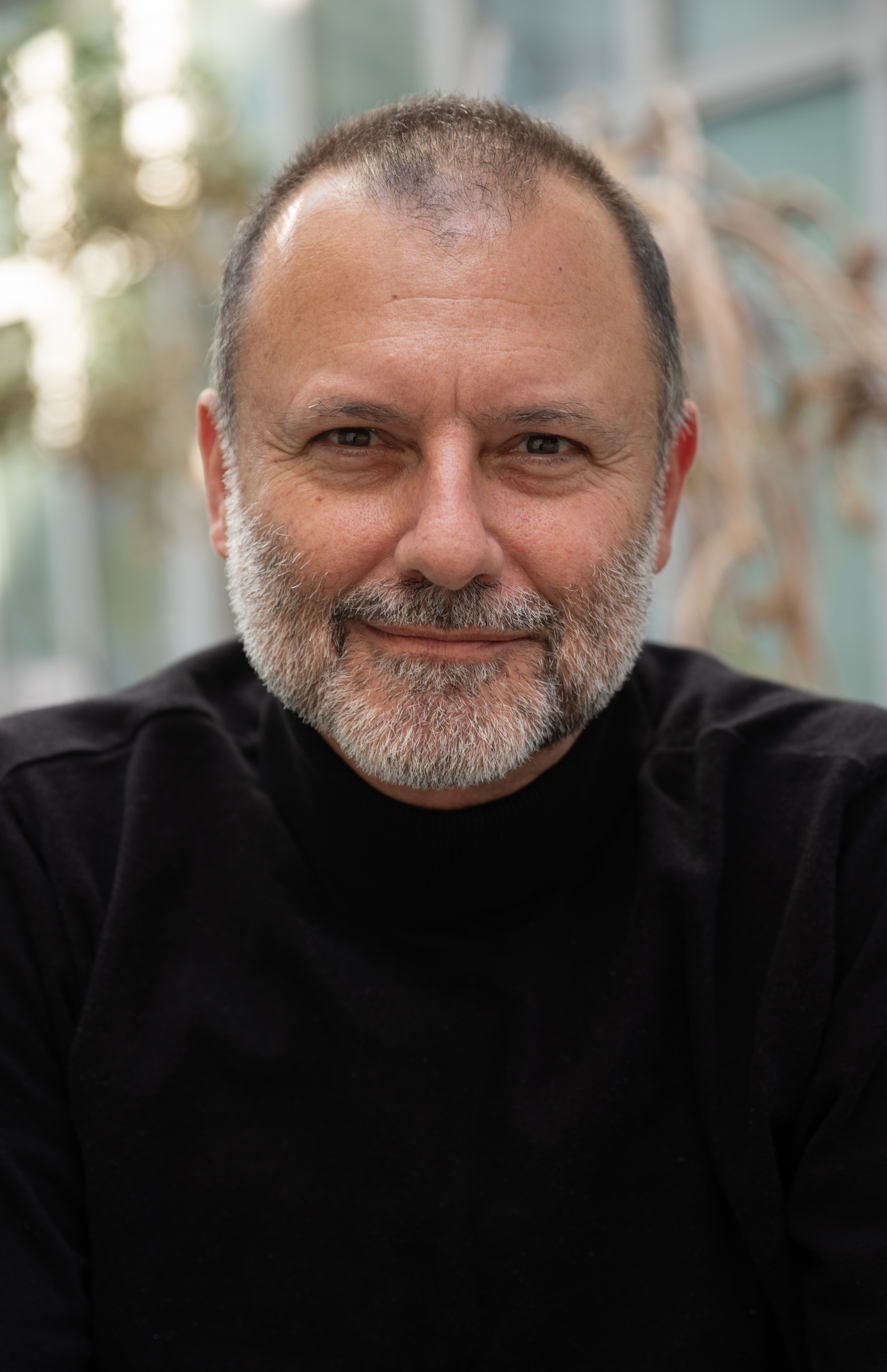
Robbie Gringras, 2023

Robbie is co-director of For the Sake of Argument, an organization that empowers leaders to work with the energy of argument. He runs the organization together with Abi Dauber Sterne with whom he wrote the book Stories for the Sake of Argument.

== Education work ==
In the UK Robbie ran a Drama workshop for young offenders in Hounslow, London, and taught Theatre studies at Kingston College.

In Israel Gringras joined Makom at the Jewish Agency for Israel after publishing his generative article "Hugging and Wrestling with Israel" in 2004. He developed this theme of Israel education throughout his time at Makom in 2008 and 2011. At the same time he explored the tense relationship between education and art with his chapter in the International Handbook of Jewish Education entitled "Educating with art without ruining it".

Following work on Israel's 60th year, Gringras began to home in on developing the Four Hatikvah Questions system of Israel education.

One of the songs he performs in this show (with friend musician, Adam Mader), is written by Ehud Banai, called Hayom, meaning "Today." Robbie Gringras calls it an “…honest love song. When you’ve landed and you’ve moved forward to the next phase of this honest relationship.” The relationship he refers to in this sweet melody is one’s relationship with Israel, and how just like in a romance between two people, Israel can be emotionally connected with at many levels. Other stories that Gringras tells in this performance are called Kissing through a Handkerchief – what happens when two cultures clash; The Arab and the Jew – the pain and humanity of the conflict between them; Chesed and Din – the overflowing love from Israeli Chutzpah; and An Unbeliever in the Holy City – a tale of a Yom Kippur in Jerusalem. San Francisco BJE and Israel Education Initiative describe Robbie Gringras and his work, "Robbie's work is delightful, and of great significance in helping build intimate, honest, [and] open relations between Israel and Diaspora".

== Theater work ==
Gringras drew attention for his 2009 performance piece The Eighth Child, penned as a response to Caryl Churchill's controversial play, Seven Jewish Children. When asked about the main message he wishes to deliver in his shows, Gringras replied, “I don’t believe in messages. It is my belief that good art (and good education) is about setting fire to important questions, and not giving self-important answers. I also believe that good art allows for an audience to assume and to interpret many different messages. The fun of art is that many people can draw from it so many different things.” Part of Robbie Gringras’s performance art is to show Jewish people how they can connect to the land of Israel. Historically, many artists, musicians, and actors have used performance art to create interest in Israel. Similar figures who have done this include artists Theodore Bikel, Amos Oz, and David D’Or. One of the main goals of Gringras’s shows is to engage his audiences into deep thinking about their connection to Judaism and Israel. He believes it is important to motivate individuals by asking pertinent questions and not necessarily by offering what he terms, “self-important answers.” According to a May 2006 Jewish Exponent article, Gringras describes himself as, "an educator trying to build intimate and emotional connections to modern Israel. American Jews are having a difficult time coming to grips with the gritty reality. We have to get up close and personal with contemporary Israel".

== Robbie Gringras’s Network ==
Robbie Gringras is also the chief editor and artist in residence of the online network, Makom. This word is translated as “place” and in Judaism is another name for God. The site includes a popular and active book club, which Gringras created together with musician Kobi Oz. Gringras says, “Makom believes that every Jew in the world should embrace the complexities of Israel in order to reach a deep and passionate commitment to Israel’s well-being. We create materials [that help] train teachers and other leaders [in writing] articles in the general media about this complexity.”
