= The Siege (play) =

Palestinian play

- Written by: The Freedom Theatre

The Siege is a Palestinian play developed and devised by The Freedom Theatre. It recounts the story of the 2002 Siege of the Church of the Nativity in Bethlehem.

== UK tour ==
In May 2015, The Freedom Theatre embarked on its first tour of the UK. The Siege was the largest touring production performed in Britain by a Palestinian theatre company.

The UK tour was organized by The Freedom Theatre UK Friends, a network of over 300 people in Britain who are engaged in the theatre’s activities. The Siege and its UK tour are supported by the EU, the British Council, Steps Beyond – European Cultural Foundation, Arts Council England and The Roddick Foundation. Other supporters include the playwright, Howard Brenton and film-maker, Ken Loach.

Funding by Arts Council England angered local Jewish community. Actress Maureen Lipman joined pro-Israel groups including Zionist Federation in a protest outside the London premiere of The Siege at Battersea Arts Centre.

== See also ==
- Seven Jewish Children
- My Name Is Rachel Corrie
