= OneFamily Fund =

Israeli nonprofit assisting terror victims

- Founder: Marc Belzberg, Chantal Belzberg
- Type: Non-profit
- Headquarters: Israel
- Services: Rehabilitation programs, therapeutic assistance

OneFamily Fund is an Israel based nonprofit organization that assists victims of Palestinian terrorist attacks, founded after the 2001 Sbarro restaurant suicide bombing. OneFamily describes itself as "the family of Israel's victims of militant attacks - those who have been bereaved, those who have been maimed, and those suffering from post-trauma as a result of terror attacks". OneFamily offers victims of terrorist attacks and their families rehabilitation programs and therapeutic assistance.

== History ==
The fund was established by Marc Belzberg and Chantal Belzberg, the parents of Michal Belzberg, a 12-year-old girl who was preparing to celebrate her Bat Mitzvah in Jerusalem when she heard the news of the Sbarro restaurant suicide bombing in which fifteen people were murdered and 130 were wounded. Michal insisted that her parents cancel the large party that the family had planned, and donate the funds to help the survivors and the families of the victims. She also asked that friends and relatives donate to the fund in place of gifts. The family rapidly turned the fund into a charitable organization that rapidly raised money for victims of terrorism directed against Israeli civilians.

== Organization ==
The group has representatives in the United States, Canada, France, and the United Kingdom.

== Actions ==
The organization has distributed $34 million to more than 2,700 victims and families of victims since its founding as of December 2011.

=== What Strong Fences Make ===
In 2009, American playwright Israel Horovitz wrote a short play entitled What Strong Fences Make in response to British playwright Caryl Churchill's play Seven Jewish Children. Horovitz has offered to allow any theater that wishes to produce What Strong Fences Make free of royalties, provided that a collection is taken up for the benefit of OneFamily.
