= Richard Stirling =

British writer and actor

Richard Stirling is an English writer and actor, who has appeared on film, television and the West End theatre and Off-Broadway stage. He studied at the Royal Academy of Dramatic Art (RADA). He has written arts features for newspapers and magazines. His 2009 play Seven Other Children was written as a response to Caryl Churchill's controversial play Seven Jewish Children.

He adapted the diaries of Cecil Beaton for performance, and played the title role. Following performances at the Edinburgh Festival Fringe in 2022, to favourable reviews, Cecil Beaton's Diaries was selected to be part of the 2023 Brits Off Broadway season, playing at New York's 59E59 Theaters in May, before touring the UK.

In 2025, his adaptation of Sir Compton Mackenzie's comic novel Extraordinary Women (novel), with a score by Tony Award winner Sarah Travis had its professional premiere, "featuring a fantastic cast" of West End performers, at Jermyn Street Theatre.

He would appear in The Gathered Leaves by Andrew Keatley, directed by Adrian Noble, with Jonathan Hyde, Chris Larkin and Olivia Vinall at Park Theatre (London) to outstanding reviews, with his portrayal as Samuel being hailed as "brilliant" and "one of London's performances of the year". He and Joanne Pearce were nominated for the 2026 Offie for "Best Performance".

== Works ==
=== Books ===
- Julie Andrews: An Intimate Biography (Sunday Times Top Ten best seller, UK Piatkus/Little Brown 2007; US St Martin's Press 2008; reprinted UK Little Brown 2013)

=== Plays ===
- Seven Other Children
- Over My Shoulder: The Jessie Matthews Story (starring Anne Rogers)
- Gay's the Word (revised version of the Ivor Novello/Alan Melville musical, starring Sophie-Louise Dann)
- A Princess Undone (starring Stephanie Beacham and subsequently Felicity Dean as Princess Margaret)
- Extraordinary Women (novel) (musical adaptation of the Compton Mackenzie novel)
- Cecil Beaton's Diaries

== Selected roles ==
=== Film and television ===
- Eternal Return (Mervin Muffley) (2024)
- The Man Who Fell to Earth (Bird Man) (2022)
- Bridgerton (2022)
- The Crown (2020)
- The Princess Switch: Switched Again (2020)
- Scoop (Tinsley's Fan) (2006)
- Great Expectations (1999)
- Our Mutual Friend (Reverend) (1998)
- Mrs Dalloway (1997)
- The Choir (Lewis) (1995)
- The Secret Agent (Stevie) (1992)
- Jeeves and Wooster (Boko Fittleworth) (1990)
- War Requiem (Third Soldier; choreographer) (1989)
- Little Dorrit (John Chivery) (1987)
