= What Strong Fences Make =

What Strong Fences Make is a 2009 play by Israel Horovitz.

== Mission ==
Horovitz told an interviewer that he wrote What Strong Fences Make because "another voice needed to be heard" in the wake of Caryl Churchill's play Seven Jewish Children, which he argues was "offensive, distorted and manipulative".

Horovitz has offered to allow any theater that wishes to produce What Strong Fences Make free of royalties, provided that a collection is taken up following all performances for the benefit of ONE Family Fund, a charity that assists children wounded in attacks on Israel.

The playwright has made the entire script of the play available as a downloadable PDF on the website of Theater J.

== Plot ==
What Strong Fences Make is set at an IDF military checkpoint just outside Ramallah. Horovitz calls it "a simple and clear stage-play that attempts to make a statement about a real-life situation that is anything but simple and clear."

== Staging ==
The first reading was staged by New York's Barefoot Theater Company on April 15, 2009.

=== Other productions ===
The play was produced at the Boston Theater Marathon in 2009.
