= Seven Other Children =

Seven Other Children is a 2009 play by Richard Stirling.

The play premiered at the New End Theatre, Hampstead, London in May 2009.

== Mission ==
Stirling penned the play as a response to Caryl Churchill's controversial play Seven Jewish Children at the Royal Court Theatre. He told the Journal of Turkish Weekly that he wrote the play "to provide necessary context to a vital debate" after Churchill's play caused "such disquiet and anger". Elsewhere, he explained that Seven Other Children shows "the tragedy of the Palestinian child as a victim of a distorted education about Israel". On 14 May, the play was given four out of five stars by the Hampstead & Highgate Express.

Proceeds from stagings of Seven Other Children are donated to the OneVoice Movement.

== Production ==
=== Premiere ===
On 11 May, London's Evening Standard carried an article with details of correspondence to Stirling from the Royal Court Theatre, where Seven Jewish Children was originally staged. In the article, Stirling disagreed with the indication from Royal Court artistic director Dominic Cooke that the Churchill play needed no balance; the article stated that the Royal Court threatened legal action if Cooke's 'excuses' were read out onstage before the production of Seven Other Children at the New End Theatre. Further details of the correspondence appeared elsewhere.

Like the Churchill play, Stirling's work is performed by nine actors and each scene is set within a period of recent history. In this play, however, the actors and the children they discuss are Palestinian.

The original production was directed by Simone Vause. The cast was Simona Armstrong, Martin Brody, Philip Chamberlin, Amerjit Deu, Joy McBrinn, Claire Malka, Jodie Osterland and Phineas Pett.

=== Other stagings ===
In May 2009, the city of Liverpool withdrew public funding from a theatre festival that had scheduled Seven Jewish Children after the producers refused to balance the political message of the Churchill play with Seven Other Children. Stirling called the producer's decision "at best incautious and at worst severely one-sided."
