= Mad Forest =

1990 play by Caryl Churchill

Mad Forest: A Play from Romania is a play by English playwright Caryl Churchill. It was developed in 1990 through collaboration with students from Romania. The three acts occur, respectively, shortly before, during, and shortly after the Romanian Revolution of 1989. The play is mostly written in English, but has several passages in Romanian, including having the cast sing Romania's national anthem, "Deşteaptă-te, române!".

The title alludes to a passage in A Concise History of Romania by Andrei Oţetea and Andrew MacKenzie that says that Bucharest stands on land that used to be an impenetrable forest "impenetrable by the foreigner who did not know the paths", known to "the horsemen of the steppe" as "Teleorman — Mad Forest" (see Codrii Vlăsiei).

== The play ==
The first act ("Lucia's Wedding") and the third act ("Florina's Wedding") are dramatic fictions. The second act ("December") is based on interviews conducted by the playwright, a director, and ten Romanian student actors.

The first act is set in Communist Romania, several months before the Revolution, and establishes an atmosphere permeated by the Securitate (Romania's secret police), in which one young woman's engagement to an American draws scrutiny on all of her family and associates. The second act—using the same actors to portray an entirely different set of characters—recounts the events of 21–25 December 1989 in Bucharest. The third act, set largely in a hospital where one of the characters from Act I is recovering from injuries sustained during the fighting engage matters such as Romanian perceptions of the Hungarian minority and many conflicting views as the extent to which the events December 1989 and the rise of Ion Iliescu constituted a coup d'état versus a revolution.

While much of the play is naturalistic, it also includes several surreal passages: minor characters include an angel, a vampire, and a ghost. Frank Rich remarks that the "conventional political satire" in the early part of the play is later overwhelmed by "a more surreal form of theater": it introduces a vampire; an archangel, who collaborated with the fascist Iron Guard in the 1930s, questions (initially through the vehicle of a paranoid character, but later through others) whether what occurred in Romania was a revolution or a putsch; and finally ends in "drunken revelry and sadistic, retributive violence."

== Performance history ==
In March 1990, commissioned by London's Central School of Speech and Drama, Caryl Churchill traveled to Bucharest with director Mark Wing-Davey and ten Speech and Drama students to research the play. They stayed with Romanian drama students and their families, and worked with about 40 Romanian drama students to develop the play. Wing-Davey even had the chance to interview a former Securitate agent, who became a character in the play. Within two months of their return to England it was in production.

Although Churchill was already an established playwright—her plays, such as Top Girls had already played in the West End and on Broadway—it premiered on "a small stage in the Embassy Theatre in North London" performed by the Speech and Drama students. The following autumn it was staged at London's Royal Court Theatre. It had its New York City premiere 22 November 1991 at the Perry Street Theatre. The New York cast included Garret Dillahunt, Tim Blake Nelson, Jake Weber and Calista Flockhart.

== Critical views ==
Mad Forest received favorable reviews, although some felt it had "rough edges". In Theatre Journal, Stanton B. Garner, Jr. lauded the second act as "remarkable" and described the play as "a powerful account of the confusions and ambiguities attendant upon a revolution that lacked the apparent moral and political clarity" of other revolutions. Garner praised Churchill's script as having "intelligence, craft, and energy". The reviewer praised Churchill for accomplished scene-shaping and gestures that are "richly representative of life under and in the wake of totalitarianism."

Frank Rich, reviewing the New York premiere, called the play "just as surprising, inventive and disturbing as the author's 'Top Girls' and 'Fen.' There is nothing kneejerk about Mad Forest [...] a full 18 months after the London opening, the piece has not dated the way that newspaper accounts of the same history already have. … The technique of Mad Forest is elliptical and atmospheric … In Act III … paroxysms of xenophobia and paranoia … often seem even more frightening than the sullen episodes of repression that preceded them." Malcolm L. Johnson of Hartford Courant lauded the work as a "harrowing, stirring, sometimes overpowering look at Romania" that "brings together disparate styles [...] to create political theater of truly epic proportions and revelatory meaning." Johnson wrote, "While 'Mad Forest' sometimes works abstractly [...] ultimately this is a clear, even familiar play."

Anna Rosenstein of the Pittsburgh Post-Gazette criticized the play as "disconnected". Rosenstein also stated that the second act, "a sort of living newspaper version of the revolution," is weaker than the first and third acts. Charles Isherwood of Variety wrote that the surrealist scenes "aren’t sufficiently illuminating to justify their inclusion in an otherwise very worldly play", and that the play's complexities could strain audience interest. However, Isherwood also dubbed the final scene "a comic, appropriately cacophonous end to a play that reverberates with the profound messiness of human history." Jeremy Gerard of the same magazine called Mad Forest "brilliant" in a review of a later Churchill play. BBC's Jamie Searle described the play as a "bold, striking" drama, writing that the second act of eye-witness accounts "gives us a powerful insight into the developing events and their impact on the people, the confusion, disbelief, hope and bravery shown against the seemingly invulnerable state machine."

Lyn Gardner of The Guardian quipped in 2009 that Mad Forest "still feels vivid and fresh". Chris Klimek wrote in 2011 that it captures the bedlam of a society in rapid upheaval, but also that "Churchill’s diversions into surrealism [...] are often clearer than the more naturalistic stretches, where even after nearly three hours, some relationships remain opaque." Barbara Lounsberry of The Waterloo-Cedar Falls Courier wrote in 2011, "I wish the long Act III could be pruned. It didn't register as powerfully for me as the first two very different acts-although the post-revolution fear, paranoia, guilt, and myriad questions certainly come through." Myron Meisel reviewed the play positively in The Hollywood Reporter two years later, writing (of four days important in the play's universe) that "Churchill remarkably does not oversimplify the action, imparting an extraordinary amount of detail with confident economy." With regards to a character's discussion of possible conspiracies, Meisel argued that "these issues of what really happened continue unresolved nearly 25 years on, a testament to the durability of Churchill’s insights into the events."

Jennie Webb of Backstage stated, "Revolution is never black and white, and Churchill wisely dwells in uncertainty and targets the surreal nature of social and political shifts in a world where the more things change, the more they stay the same." However, the critic found the "realistic aspects" of Act 3 problematic because of absurdity of the questions the characters were facing. Webb wrote that Mad Forest "ends up being a bit drawn out and unwieldy, but it’s still well worth the trip." Beth Schachter, who directed a performance of the play, said in 2014, "Working on that production gave me insight into what is going on underneath the words, and more importantly, underneath the silences. This play clarifies what so often goes unsaid between people in difficult situations."
