= James Macdonald (director) =

British theatre and film director (born 1958)

James Macdonald is a British theatre and film director who is best known for his work with contemporary writers such as Caryl Churchill. He was associate and deputy director of the Royal Court Theatre from 1992 to 2006. There he staged the premiere of Sarah Kane's Blasted (1995), her highly controversial debut which sparked a Newsnight debate on BBC Television. He also directed the premiere of Kane's Cleansed (1998) and 4.48 Psychosis which opened after her suicide.

Born in 1958, Macdonald began working as a director at the Royal Court under Max Stafford-Clark, in his twenties after graduating from Oxford University and L'Ecole Internationale de Theatre Jacques Lecoq. Since leaving the Royal Court in 2007 Macdonald has worked extensively in New York, in most of the major theatres across London and the West End, and directed a 2008 feature film of A Number by Caryl Churchill for HBO/BBC Films.

His productions include Fewer Emergencies by Martin Crimp at the Royal Court (2005), Glengarry Glen Ross in the West End (2007), The world premiere of The Arrest of Ai Weiwei at the Hampstead Theatre (2013) and Bakkhai at Almeida Theatre in 2015.

James Macdonald is on the board of Stage Directors UK.

== Productions ==
- A Number by Caryl Churchill, New York Theatre Workshop, New York (2005)
- Exiles by James Joyce (Royal National Theatre) (2006)
- Dying City by Christopher Shinn (Lincoln Centre Theater NY) (2007)
- Glengarry Glen Ross, (Apollo Theatre, London) (2008)
- Drunk Enough to Say I Love You? (The Public Theater NY, The Royal Court Theatre) (2008)
- Top Girls (Manhattan Theatre Club at Biltmore Theatre, New York) (2008)
- Judgement Day by Odon von Horvath (Almeida Theatre, London) (2009)
- Cock (world premiere) (The Royal Court Theatre, London) (2009), winner of Laurence Olivier Award
- The Book of Grace (world premiere) by Suzan-Lori Parks (The Public Theater, New York) (2010)
- John Gabriel Borkman (The Abbey Theatre, Dublin, and Brooklyn Academy of Music, Harvey Theatre, New York) (2010-2011)
- A Delicate Balance by Edward Albee (Almeida Theatre, London) (2011)
- King Lear by Joseph Papp (The Public Theater, New York) (2011)
- And No More Shall We Part (Hampstead Theatre, London) (2012)
- Cock by Mike Bartlett (US premiere) (The Duke on 42nd Street, New York) (2012)
- Love and Information (world premiere) (The Royal Court Theatre, London) (2012)
- Circle Mirror Transformation (The Royal Court Theatre, Rose Lipman Building, London) (2013)
- Roots (Donmar Warehouse, London) (2013)
- Love and Information (New York Theatre Workshop, The Royal Court Theatre at Minetta Lane Theatre, New York) (2014)
- The Wolf From the Door (world premiere) by Rory Mullarkey (The Royal Court Theatre, Jerwood Theatre Upstairs, London) (2014)
- The Father by Florian Zeller (Theatre Royal, Bath Productions) (2014)
- Bakkhai (Almeida Theatre, London) (2015)
- Cloud 9 (Atlantic Theater Company Linda Gross Theatre, New York, NY) (2015)
- Escaped Alone by Caryl Churchill (Royal Court Theatre, London) (2016)
- Who's Afraid of Virginia Woolf? by Edward Albee (Harold Pinter Theatre, London) (2017)
- John by Annie Baker (Royal National Theatre, London) (2018)
- True West by Sam Shepard (American Airlines Theatre, New York) (2018)
- The Night of the Iguana by Tennessee Williams (Noël Coward Theatre, London) (2019)
- Glass, Kill, Bluebeard, and Imp. by Caryl Churchill (Royal Court Theatre, London) (2019)
- Waiting for Godot by Samuel Beckett (Theatre Royal Haymarket, London) (2024)

== Awards and nominations ==
- Evening Standard Awards, Best Play, The Father, Theatre Royal Bath, 2015
- Obie Award USA, winner, Best Director for Love and Information, 2014
- Evening Standard Awards, Longlisted for Best Director, Roots, Donmar Warehouse, 2013
- Evening Standard Awards, Longlisted for Best Director, Love and Information by Caryl Churchill, (Royal Court Downstairs), 2012
