= Once in a Lifetime (David Meece album) =

Once In A Lifetime

Studio album by David Meece
- Released: 1993
- Studio: Skylab Studios (Nashville, Tennessee); Shakin' Studios and Allies Recording Studios (Franklin, Tennessee); Alpha Studios (Burbank, California)
- Genre: Contemporary Christian
- Length: 38:08
- Label: StarSong
- Producer: David Meece; Brian Tankersley

David Meece chronology
Learning To Trust (1990)	Once In A Lifetime (1993)	Odyssey (1995)

Once In A Lifetime was David Meece's eleventh album.

== Track listing ==
1. "Inside Out" – (M: David Meece, L: Meece, Dwight Liles) – 3:59
2. "Over You" – (M: Meece, L: Meece, Michael Hudson) – 4:02
3. "Brokenness" – (M: Meece, L: Meece, Hudson, Liles, Niles Borop) – 3:56
4. "Every Little Step" – (M: Meece, L: Meece, Liles, Deborah Meece) – 4:02
5. "Going Home" – (M: Meece, L: Meece, Hudson) – 5:04
6. "Early In the Morning" – (M: Meece, L: Meece, Hudson) – 4:45
7. "My Father's Chair" – (M: Meece, L: Meece, Liles) – 5:07
8. "Once In A Lifetime" – (M: Meece, L: Meece, Liles, Hudson, Debbie Meece) – 3:25
9. "Living In the Shadows" – (M: Meece, L: Meece, Hudson) – 3:30

== Musicians ==
- David Meece – vocals, acoustic piano, keyboards
- Paul Mills – additional keyboards (6), additional percussion (6)
- George Cocchini – electric guitars
- Michael Hodge – electric guitars, acoustic guitars
- Jerry McPherson – electric guitars
- Dale Oliver – electric guitars
- Brian Tankersley – bass, drums
- Deborah Meece – viola (5)
- David Betros – backing vocals
- Lisa Bevill – backing vocals
- Kristina Clark – backing vocals
- Reneé Garcia – backing vocals
- Carrie Hodge – backing vocals
- Gary Koreiba – backing vocals
- Guy Penrod – backing vocals
- Chris Rodriguez – backing vocals
- Judson Spence – backing vocals
- Sarah Underwood – backing vocals
- Chris Willis – backing vocals
- Kelly Meece – guest vocals (7)

Men's chorus on "Going Home"

- Morgan Cryar, John Mandeville, Hank Martin and Freddie Richardson

== Production ==
- Darrell A. Harris – executive producer
- David Meece – producer
- Brian Tankersley – producer, recording, mixing
- Terry Bates – additional engineer, second engineer
- Russell Burt – second engineer
- Barry Campbell – second engineer
- Greg Parker – second engineer
- Hank Williams – mastering at MasterMix (Nashville, TN)
- Toni Thigpen – executive art direction
- Steve Urbano – sleeve art direction
- Joan Tankersley – creative director
- SRG Design – sleeve design, logo design, photo manipulation
- Valerie Gates – sleeve photography
- Carter Bradley – grooming, wardrobe styling

== Charts ==
Chart performance for Once in a Lifetime
Chart (1993)	Peak position
US Christian Albums (Billboard)	3
