= Far Away (play) =

2000 play by Caryl Churchill

- Original language: English
- Written by: Caryl Churchill
- Genre: Drama; Dystopian
- Setting: A woman's cottage, a hat factory, and a post-apocalyptic near future

Premiere
- Date: November 2000
- Place: Royal Court Theatre; London, England

Far Away is a 2000 play by British playwright Caryl Churchill. It has four characters, Harper, Young Joan, Joan, and Todd, and is based on the premise of a world in which everything in nature is at war. It is published by Nick Hern Books. While some critics have expressed reservations about the play's ending, many regard Far Away as one of Churchill's finest plays.

== List of characters ==
- Joan – a woman who works as a milliner designing hats for prisoners
  - Young Joan is played by a separate actress in some productions.
- Harper – Joan's aunt, a woman who is hiding a dark secret from her niece
- Todd – Joan's coworker and love interest

== Plot summary ==
Act 1, Scene 1 begins in Harper's kitchen. It is late. Harper's niece (Young Joan) enters and claims that she can't sleep. After a few attempts by her aunt to get her back in bed, she tells Harper that she just came back into the house after climbing out of her window to investigate a sound that she heard. Joan says that she just witnessed her uncle, Harper's husband, loading bloody children and other people into the back of a lorry. After repeated attempts to censor what Joan saw, Harper tells her that the uncle is saving the children and taking them to a safer place. She tells Joan that she can never tell anyone about what she saw because it would put all of their lives in danger. Harper claims they are on the good side and are making the world a better place.

Act 2, Scene 1 is roughly 15 years later in a factory where an adult Joan has just begun her professional career as a milliner. Her co-worker Todd is an established hatter and is experienced in the field. Various days at the factory are seen, with the hats that Joan and Todd are making in various stages of completion over time. Todd and Joan exchange basic conversation about this body of work and about their previous works. Todd says that the company has been pushing for hats to be created quicker for the parades; they used to have two weeks to finish a hat but now they only have one.

Scene 2: Joan and Todd learn more about each other through a discussion about their current hat designs. Todd brings up a hypothesis that the way the company gets contracts is corrupt, claiming there is a certain person's brother-in-law that is involved. Joan wants to know more, but Todd doesn't want to talk about it at work. Joan changes the topic, saying she does not like to watch the trials at night. Todd says he watches them every night while drinking Pernod, or absinthe.

Scene 3: Todd and Joan speak about different hat genres: Animal and Abstract. Joan changes the subject and asks why Todd doesn't do something (regarding the corruption). He says he spends days wondering what he should do.

Scene 4: Joan and Todd compliment each other on their almost completed hats. Todd announces he is going to talk to "him" (someone working above Todd). He says he is going to talk about the brother-in-law and hint at the possibility of leaking information to a friend of his who is a journalist. He says that if he lost his job, he'd miss Joan.

Scene 5 shows the completed hats of Todd and Joan on the heads of prisoners being marched to have the hats "judged" in the trials.

Scene 6 returns to the factory. Joan states that she can't believe that she won. She says she doesn't understand why more aren't kept, because they could be re-used. Todd says that keeping more hats would put them out of work. Joan thinks it is sad that all the hats are burned with the bodies. Todd says that the hats are metaphorical for life. He is not bothered that only three out of nearly 300 hats that he has created made it to the museum. He loves making beauty that disappears. Todd brings up his meeting with "him". "He" said, "These things must be thought about". Todd wonders if "he" was talking about the content of their meeting, or if he should fire Todd. Joan reminds Todd about the journalist he knows. Joan hypothesizes that the whole industry is corrupt. She says that if Todd is fired, she will resign. Todd almost tells Joan that he loves her, but quickly changes to saying that he loves beads.

Act 3, Scene 1 finds Harper and Todd at Harper's house waiting for Joan to return. They discuss the paranoia caused by not knowing what side various aspects of nature is on. They are very worried about Joan who eventually returns in a very frazzled state. She delivers a monologue about her fear of every natural thing on her journey (a stream, horses, light, and dark). She does not know whose side of the war they are on.

== Theme ==
The main theme of Far Away is fear: more specifically, the fear imposed by a government upon its citizens. This fear permeates the work, from the smuggling of people by Joan's uncle to the public march of death for prisoners of the government.

The theme is brought to its climax in Joan's final monologue where she describes being so afraid of the duality created by the propaganda of this new world that she has trouble walking home because she cannot tell whose side a stream is on, or the grass, or the flies, etc.

== Reception and legacy ==
=== Critical reception ===
Matt Wolf of Variety wrote that the final scene of Far Away has "an authorial vision veering not so much toward the absurdist as the absurd", criticizing the "didactic display of societal ills [...] There's enough latent foreboding in every second of Daldry's production not to need such thesis-mongering". Charles Isherwood of the same magazine asserted that the play is "a small, oblique masterwork", praising Churchill's "acute sensitivity to human suffering, her audacious imagination and her increasing economy of means. [...] its scenes are like little pieces of a puzzle you fondle with distracted fascination until suddenly, terribly, they fit together". Isherwood interpreted the play as a "reminder that the comforting narratives of good and evil that are often retailed by figures of authority [...] can be fairy tales concocted to mask darker truths. And belief in them [...] can have terrible repercussions". The Guardian's Michael Billington gave the play four out of five stars, praising the first scene highly but writing that "the journey from the farmhouse reality of the first scene to the cosmic chaos of the last is too swift [...] Churchill's best effects are achieved through the sudden injection of shock words that set off seismic disturbances." In 2014 Billington listed the play as one of the five greatest theatrical works of dystopian drama, arguing that "even if there is something abrupt about the transition from political brutalism to natural disorder, the play defiantly endures."

Michael Phillips of the Chicago Tribune wrote in 2004 that the work is "a two-thirds masterpiece [...] Moving from mundane realism to ham-handed surrealism, 'Far Away' undercuts its own eerie effectiveness." In 2006, The Independent's Paul Taylor praised the play as one of the best dramas of the new millennium, and argued that it "comprises three linked profound ponderings upon politics and the relationship between the private life of the individual and harrowing universal chaos. [...] One of the remarkable features of Far Away is that it captures so much of what is mad and rigorously regrettable in our insane global polity while steadfastly refusing to refer to topical issues." It was later listed among the 40 best plays of all time in the same publication, with Taylor arguing that Churchill "[finds] a brilliantly absurdist way of attacking the pernicious myth that there is a simple divide between virtue and evil, 'them' and 'us'. A sliver of genius."

Matthew Cheney of Tor.com wrote in 2011 that Far Away is the Churchill work to which he "[returns] most often. Partly, this is because the play is full of suggestion and ambiguity, and utterly lacking in resolution; an effect that, in this case, is haunting rather than, as it would be in the hands of a less skilled writer, frustrating. [...] Like all great tragedies, it contains more than any summary can say. Its meaning is not merely a moral statement; its meaning is the play itself: its imagery and words, its lacunae and aporias." Mary Leland of The Irish Times gave a 2017 Spike Island performance a full five stars. Aaron Scott of Portland Monthly, who saw a performance at Shaking the Tree Theatre, wrote that "its thought-provoking flavors will linger well into the night. [...] the audience is left with a sense of the general yet overwhelming absurdity of fear and war".

Howard Loxton of the Camden New Journal asserted in 2020 that the play "lasts only 45 minutes but has power out of all proportion. [...] Far Away is unsettlingly dramatic and well worth seeing." Miriam Gillinson noted that "Churchill’s opening scene is often described as a masterclass in theatrical tension". However, Gillinson also argued, "The production is only 45 minutes long and the words, and silences, could do with more time to land. It’s only in the dying moments, when a dazed Joan describes the chaos outside, that the play truly unsettles." Andrzej Lukowski of Time Out praised "how powerfully and pithily it reads on the page" and stated that Far Away is "Churchill at hurricane force, savage, hilarious, totally unlike anyone else." Jessie Thompson of the Evening Standard dubbed it a "masterful work" and lauded the black humor of the writing. Sam Marlowe of The Times said the play had "moments that, with skin-prickling prescience, speak of the rising tide of populism, division, hatred and fear."

Alice Saville of Exeunt wrote, "Churchill subtly scrapes away at the selectiveness of the stories we tell to give our world value, to make it feel safe and cosy." Paul Ewing of Londonist asserted that "it's unsettling enough to leave the audience nervously laughing. [...] What may have seemed far away then looks a bit prophetic now." Aleks Sierz of The Arts Desk said in 2020, "I do love this play, but I must admit that – unlike Churchill's very best work – its meaning doesn't deepen very much over the decades. [...] the nature of visions is that they either come literally true, or they remain visionary. And this one remains what it always was: a beautifully imagined fantastical nightmare." Far Away was described as a "great play" on Saturday Review.

=== Response from playwrights ===
The play has received high praise from many notable playwrights and has been cited as an inspirational work.

Simon Stephens described the play in 2004 as being ahead of its time, remarking that "for me the strongest theatrical response to 9/11 was prescient and came before it, which was Caryl Churchill’s Far Away. I remember reading [the play] in April 2000 and loving it but feeling it had […] the kind of timbre of absurdism about it, and you read it now and it feels like social realism." In 2014 Stephens stated that the play "I think remains the most significant play of this millennium. I think it was astonishingly prescient in its depiction of a culture on the cusp of apocalypse. And linguistically so granite-tight and the images so beautiful."

In a 2012 article for The Guardian, April De Angelis listed Far Away as one of the "landmark" Churchill plays.

Mark Ravenhill has said that seeing the play was "one of my most revelatory moments at the Royal Court" and that "[watching the play] you feel your brain re-wiring itself on your sense of how language works, and who we are in that moment sort of neurologically shifting."

Nick Payne has said that his own Olivier-nominated play Constellations is "hugely indebted" to Far Away as well as two other plays by Churchill, Blue Heart and A Number. Payne has said that these three plays by Churchill are "probably my three favourite plays ever" and that he has "probably read them more than any other plays".

E.V. Crowe has cited the play as an influence on her work, stating that "I first read Far Away as part of the Royal Court's Young Writers Programme in a sea of ‘normal’ plays. It got under my skin but I didn’t know why. It felt shockingly intense at a time when I felt deadened with irony and imagined myself unshockable. That's what I hope to be most influenced by in Caryl Churchill's work, the intensity of purpose and intensity of connection to the outside world. To have the courage to be that purposeful and to find a mode of expression to deliver the message without flinching."

The playwright Alistair McDowall has stated that "It seems, through conversation with my peers, that the two plays with the biggest impact on my generation are Sarah Kane's Blasted and Far Away by Caryl Churchill. Far Away is endlessly talked about. It feels so bespoke and beautifully crafted but the scale is enormous – it's so wrought, so sprawling."

== Production history ==
Far Away was first produced at the Royal Court Theatre Upstairs in London in November/December 2000.

A German production, entitled In weiter Ferne, opened in April 2001 at the Schaubühne am Lehniner Platz in Berlin, directed by Falk Richter.

A production of Far Away ran at New York Theatre Workshop in New York City from 11 November 2002 to 18 January 2003. The production was nominated for the 2003 Lucille Lortel Awards for Outstanding Costume Design and Outstanding Sound Design.

Gustavus Adolphus College ran the show for 2 weekends from October 30, 2009 to November 7, 2009. It was performed preceding another one of Caryl Churchill's plays Seven Jewish Children, as well as a response to this play called Seven Palestinian Children by Deb Margolin.

The play was performed at the Theatre Royal at the Bristol Old Vic from 24 May to 9 June 2010. It was directed by Simon Godwin, and starred Annette Badland, Tristan Sturrock and Cara Horgan.

Saint Cloud State University ran a production of Far Away from 20 to 24 November 2019. The production starred Katherine DeGroot as Joan, Jordan Flaherty as Todd, and Jessica Peters as Harper. It was directed by Vladimir Rovinsky.

The play was performed at the Donmar Warehouse from 6 February to 4 April 2020. This production starred Jessica Hynes as Harper, Aisling Loftus as Joan and Simon Manyonda as Todd. It was directed by Lyndsey Turner, and was cut short due to the COVID-19 pandemic.

PTP/NYC (Potomac Theatre Project) premiered a digital production starring Ro Boddie, Nesba Crenshaw, Caitlin Duffy and Lilah May Pfeiffer, and directed by Cheryl Faraone, that ran from 15 October to 18 October 2020.

A site-specific immersive promenade production of Far Away was directed by Rebecca McCutcheon for her company Lost Text/Found Space in Ambika P3 (a cavernous concrete basement below a University of Westminster building). Running from 13-23 August 2025 as part of the Camden Fringe, it garnered 5 star reviews, including in Plays International which noted "Churchill’s work continues to prove its worth by showing us the things we can no longer see because we have forgotten that, once, they were not normal".
