= Here I Go Again (disambiguation) =

"Here I Go Again" is a 1982 song by Whitesnake.

Here I Go Again may also refer to:

== Songs and albums ==
- "Here I Go Again" (E-Type song)
- "Here I Go Again" (Glenn Jones song)
- "Here I Go Again" (Guys 'n' Dolls song)
- "Here I Go Again" (Mario song)
- "Here I Go Again" (The Miracles song)
- "Here I Go Again", song by Country Joe and the Fish from Here We Are Again
- "Here I Go Again", song by Casting Crowns from Casting Crowns
- "Here I Go Again", song by Kim Richey from My Heart
- "Here I Go Again", song by Rihanna from Music of the Sun
- "Here I Go Again", song by Thin Lizzy, b-side of "The Rocker"
- "Here I Go Again", song by Archie Bell & the Drells from There's Gonna Be a Showdown
- "Here I Go Again", a song by Luba & Curtis King Jr.
- Stay with the Hollies, released in the United States as Here I Go Again
  - "Here I Go Again" (The Hollies song), the titular track of the US release
- Here I Go Again (EP), by The Hollies

== Television ==
- "Here I Go Again" (Legends of Tomorrow), an episode of Legends of Tomorrow

== See also ==
- Here We Go Again (disambiguation)
- Here I Go (disambiguation)
- "Here I Go Impossible Again", a song by Erasure
- There I Go Again, album by David Meece
