= 7 (David Meece album) =

Studio album by David Meece
- Released: 1985
- Studio: Bill Schnee Studios, Mama Jo's Recording Studio and Weddington Studio (North Hollywood, California); Rumbo Recorders (Los Angeles, California); Front Page Recording (Glendale, California); Bullet Recording, Ocean Way Nashville, Emerald Sound Studios, Hummingbird Studio, Gold Mine Studio and Treasure Isle Recorders (Nashville, Tennessee)
- Genre: Contemporary Christian Music, Christian rock
- Length: 36:50
- Label: Myrrh
- Producer: Brown Bannister; Jonathan David Brown; Skip Konte; David Meece; Greg Nelson; Keith Thomas

David Meece chronology
Count the Cost (1983)	7 (1985)	Chronology (1986)

7, sometimes called Seven, is the seventh album by artist David Meece. Five of the nine tracks charted on Christian radio in 1985 and 1986.

== Track listing ==
All songs written by David Meece, except where noted.

1. "You Can Go" (Meece, Michael Card, Mike Hudson) – 3:13
2. "Tumblin' Down" – 3:33
3. "Forgiven" – 4:08
4. "The Ladder" (Meece, Hudson) – 3:44
5. "The Alien" (Keith Thomas, Meece) – 4:33
6. "We Can Overcome It All" – 3:32
7. "The Unknown Soldier" with Twila Paris (Meece, Morgan Cryar, Jonathan David Brown) – 4:43
8. "Lean On Each Other" – 3:49
9. "I Can See" (Meece, Gloria Gaither) – 5:34

== Personnel ==
- David Meece – lead vocals, backing vocals (1, 2, 7), acoustic piano (9)
- Robbie Buchanan – synthesizers (1, 2), acoustic piano (3)
- Shane Keister – acoustic piano (1), Fairlight piano (1), acoustic guitar (1), Yamaha GS1 (2), sound effects (2), vocoder (2, 3), keyboards (8)
- Rhett Lawrence – synthesizers (3), sound effects (3), additional programming (7)
- Keith Thomas – keyboards (4, 5), arrangements (4, 5), backing vocals (5)
- John Andrew Schreiner – keyboards (6), LinnDrum programming (6), arrangements (6)
- Carl Marsh – Fairlight programming (7)
- Dann Huff – rhythm guitar (2), guitar solo (2), electric guitar (3), guitars (4, 5)
- Michael Thompson – guitars (6)
- Marty Walsh – electric guitar (7)
- Jon Goin – guitars (8)
- Mike Brignardello – bass (1–3, 8)
- Nathan East – bass (4, 5)
- Paul Leim – drums (1–3), drum programming (1)
- Carlos Vega – drums (4, 5)
- Lee Kix – drums (6)
- Mark Hammond – drums (8)
- Lenny Castro – percussion (1, 2)
- Farrell Morris – percussion (8)
- Mark Douthit – saxophone (5)
- Alan Moore – orchestration (9)
- Greg Nelson – conductor (9)
- Eberhard Ramm – musical score preparation (9)
- The Nashville String Machine – strings (9)
- Chris Harris – backing vocals (1, 2)
- Gary Pigg – backing vocals (1, 2)
- Allen Green – backing vocals (4, 5)
- Greg Guidry – backing vocals (4, 5)
- Denny Henson – backing vocals (4, 5)
- Dana Hiett – backing vocals (6)
- Biff Vincent – backing vocals (6)
- Twila Paris – lead and backing vocals (7)
- Jonathan David Brown – backing vocals (7), arrangements (7)
- First Call – backing vocals (8)
  - Bonnie Keen
  - Marty McCall
  - Melodie Tunney

Production

- Michael Blanton – executive producer (1–3)
- Dan Harrell – executive producer (1–3)
- Lynn Nichols – executive producer (4–9)
- Brown Bannister – producer (1–3)
- Keith Thomas – producer (4, 5)
- Skip Konte – producer (6), engineer (6)
- Jonathan David Brown – producer (7), engineer (7)
- David Meece – producer (8, 9)
- Greg Nelson – producer (8, 9)
- Jack Joseph Puig – engineer (1–3)
- Jeff Balding – engineer (4, 5), production assistant (4, 5), mixing at MasterMix (Nashville, Tennessee)
- Ed Seay – engineer (8, 9)
- Steve Ford – assistant engineer (1–3)
- Dan Garcia – assistant engineer (1–3)
- Allan Henry – assistant engineer (1–3)
- Bob Lockhart – assistant engineer (7)
- Terry Lang – assistant engineer (7)
- Tom Van Etten – assistant engineer (7)
- Tom Harding – assistant engineer (8, 9)
- Joe Bogan – additional engineer (4, 5)
- Gene Eichelberger – additional engineer (4, 5)
- Steve Hall – mastering at Future Disc (Hollywood, California)
- Bubba Smith – production coordinator and consultant (1–3, 6, 7)
- Lori Loving – production assistant (4, 5)
- Gloria Cox – production manager (8, 9)
- Buddy Jackson – art direction, design, at Jackson Design
- Mark Tucker – photography

== Charts ==
=== Album ===
Chart performance for 7
Chart (1985)	Peak position
US Christian Albums (Billboard)	9

=== Singles ===
1. "You Can Go" – No. 1 for five weeks in 1985
2. "Forgiven" – No. 8 in 1985
3. "We Can Overcome It All" – No. 10 in 1986
4. "The Unknown Soldier" with Twila Paris – No. 8 in 1986
5. "The Alien" – No. 15 in 1986
