= Glass. Kill. Bluebeard. Imp. =

2019 series of plays

- Written by: Caryl Churchill
- Original language: English

Premiere
- Date premiered: 18 September 2019
- Place premiered: Royal Court Theatre

Glass. Kill. Bluebeard. Imp. is a 2019 series of plays by British playwright Caryl Churchill that were premiered together.

== Reception ==
After viewing the Royal Court Theatre premiere, Sam Marlowe of The Times lauded the plays as "crystalline in their grace and lucidity, audacious in their form. In these four short plays Churchill conjures the neurosis and fragility of our precarious modern lives and the patterns of behaviour and belief that govern them. [...] It’s all incredibly intricate, yet effortless, and James Macdonald’s impeccable production delivers it with playful vaudevillian swagger." Aleks Sierz of The Arts Desk gave the performance four out of five stars and wrote, "Each of them is vividly distinct, being linguistically agile, theatrically pleasurable and emotionally dark". The critic argued that the "deeper point [of Kill] is that if the barbarity of ancient Greek revenge killings and brutal deities are at the heart of Western civilization then it's hardly surprising that today's murderous psychos can 'be so charming'." Sierz called Bluebeard's Friends "gloriously gothic".

David Benedict of The Stage awarded the performance a full five stars. Evening Standard's Jessie Thompson dubbed the plays "a thrilling reminder of why she’s our greatest living playwright. [...] Churchill spans everything from poetry to surrealism to tell four tales that feel both urgent to our current moment and like timeless, amber-cast fairytales." The critic described Imp as "a poignant look at how our beliefs can comfort and trap us", and praised Bluebeard's Friends as "the most incisive dramatic study of our post-Weinstein mentality we’ve yet to see". Michael Billington of The Guardian wrote, "The power of [Imp] lies in its suggestion that even a life of studied ordinariness conceals untold mysteries." Billington argued that Bluebeard and Kill effectively make the point "that we are all haunted by a fascination with bloodshot fables", but described Glass as "somewhat opaque".

In a five-star review of the premiere, Paul Taylor of The Independent lauded the "audacious, haunting and often horribly funny games the veteran dramatist is playing" in the series. Taylor wrote that "with remarkable stealth and economy, [Bluebeard's Friends] shows how a materialist, shameless culture allows this network of hangers-on to brazen out any tendencies to self-blame." He also argued that with Imp, Churchill "creates a powerful sense of a fractured world where well-meaning people can turn in a trice against outsiders, and unnerved people fear everything". Andrzej Lukowski of Time Out wrote that while the work is lesser than Escaped Alone, "her almost supernatural powers of language remain entirely undimmed." He described Bluebeard's Friends as the "most incisive" of the first three plays. However, Rosemary Waugh of New Statesman expressed disagreement with the praise of this third work as "the great #MeToo play we were all waiting for", saying that "Glass is by far the most intriguing thanks to how it resists interpretation [...] incredibly, piercingly sad at the end, despite the fact you’re still unsure about exactly what you’ve just witnessed."

Susannah Clapp of The Observer argued, "Churchill’s elastic way with structure and the gauntlet of her ideas are so striking that there is a risk of overlooking just how comic a writer she is, and how powerful a creator of weird and credible dialogue. [...] There is a beautiful arc to the evening as the final line quietly touches on opening moments. It is a testament to these oblique, remarkable plays that a single word can provoke a murmur of recognition." In Exeunt, Hannah Greenstreet said, "When I watched it, I found Glass frustratingly oblique and the conceit overstretched, but the writing rewards meditative, returning attention." She argued that Imp "seems to suggest the power of the things we keep bottled up (desire, violence, a craving for companionship), but also expresses a note of hope in the possibility for relationships even in unlikely circumstances. [...] The combination of the four forms a kaleidoscopic meditation on the power of stories."

Conversely, Dominic Cavendish of The Telegraph gave the same performance three out of five stars, saying that Bluebeard and Imp are less compelling than the first two plays. The Spectator's Lloyd Evans criticized Kill and Bluebeard, writing, "The weakness of the script [for Bluebeard], as with sketch two, is that it’s a commentary on a drama rather than a drama itself." He praised Imp, making a comparison to Alan Bennett and arguing that "these oddball characters are curiously engaging and full of realistic details. [...] the humorous dialogue and the quirky characters are a welcome relief from the flimsy and pretentious efforts that precede it."
