= There I Go =

There I Go may refer to:

- There I Go (1940 song), a song by Vaughn Monroe and his Orchestra, also recorded by Will Bradley and his Orchestra
- There I Go (Gucci Mane song), 2023
- There I Go (album), a 2025 album by Vincent Mason
- "There I Go", a song by Moka Only from the album Clap Trap, 2008

== See also ==
- Here I Go (disambiguation)
- There I Go Again, a 2002 album by David Meece
