= The Skriker =

1994 play written by Caryl Churchill

- Original language: English
- Written by: Caryl Churchill
- Characters: Lily; Josie; Skriker
- Subject: Post-natal psychosis, Possession
- Genre: Epic dance theatre

Premiere
- Date: 1994
- Place: Royal National Theatre, London

The Skriker is a 1994 play by Caryl Churchill that tells the story of an ancient fairy who, during the course of the play, transforms into a plethora of objects and people as it pursues Lily and Josie, two teenage mothers whom it befriends, manipulates, seduces and entraps. Whilst speaking English in its human incarnations, the Skriker’s own language consists of broken and fragmented word play. Blending naturalism, horror and magical realism, it is a story of love, loss and revenge. As with Churchill's A Mouthful of Birds (1986), the play explores the themes of post-natal psychosis and possession.

== Performances ==
The Skriker opened in January 1994 in London at the National Theatre's Cottesloe auditorium, starring Kathryn Hunter, Sandy McDade, and Jacqueline Defferary, and was directed by Les Waters.

In 1996, the play's American debut was at New York's Public Theater, starring Jayne Atkinson, Caroline Seymour, and Angie Phillips with Philip Seymour Hoffman and an ensemble cast. Cast: Jayne Atkinson (the Skriker), Angie Phillips (Lily), Caroline Seymour (Rosie); April Armstrong, Marc Calamia, Rene M. Ceballos, Torrin T. Cummings, Kate Egan, Philip Seymour Hoffman, Jodi Melnick, Ric Oquita, Diana Rice, Valda Setterfield, Jack Shamblin, Doug Von Nessen, Sturgis Warner. It was directed by Mark Wing-Davey. It was presented by the Joseph Papp Public Theater/New York Shakespeare Festival at 425 Lafayette Street, East Village.

In November 2006, The Virtual Theatricality Lab at Henry Ford College staged the play using 3D stereo digital technology and motion capture to create the scenery, creatures and fairies. It was directed by George Popovich. Digital scenery, creatures and animations were by Christopher Dozier.

In 2011, Arizona State University produced the play. It was directed by Joya Scott. In November 2011, it was performed at Tulane University in New Orleans, LA. It was directed by Rebecca Frank. In February 2012 the play was performed at Purchase College, SUNY directed by Genee Coreno.

The play was staged in October 2012 at the Erickson Theater in Seattle, WA. Produced and directed by Janice Findley, co-produced by Curtis Taylor, and choreographed by Pat Graney.

The play was staged in July 2015 at The Royal Exchange in Manchester, England starring Maxine Peake. Commissioned and produced by Manchester International Festival and the Royal Exchange Theatre, the production included Laura Elsworthy as Josie, Juma Sharkah as Lily.

In December 2015 the Silver Spring, Maryland production company Welcome Homesick staged The Skriker in The Silver Spring Black Box Theater. The production was self-directed and starred Meg Lebow as Josie, Sophie Cameron as Lily, and Aziza Afzal, Emma Bergman, and Clare Lefebure as the Skriker.

== Language ==
One of the play's most unusual features is its eponymous protagonist's language, Graham Wolfe has drawn connections with Lacan's lalangue, which Mladen Dolar defines as “the concept of what in language makes puns possible”: "For all the Skriker’s monstrous malevolence, such an admirer of homonyms ('sham pain', 'morning becomes electric') could hardly scoff at Lacan, whose later seminars bear such titles as Les non-dupes errent (les nommes du père) and Encore (en-corps, en coeur), confronting us with creatures named parlêtre (par la lettre) and sinthome (symptom, synthetic homme, saint Thomas). Not even the Skriker’s wildest homonymic explosions — 'no mistake no mister no missed her no mist no miss no me no' (9) — are a match for some of Lacan’s most famous riffs: jouissance, j’ouïs-sens, jouis-sens, jouis-sans . . ." (Wolfe 89).

== Reception ==
When The Skriker opened at the National Theatre in 1994, reviews were mixed. Jeremy Gerard of Variety lauded the play as "a major achievement and unlike anything else seen onstage this season [...] a truly original work". Gerard wrote that "Churchill gives the Skriker a kind of sing-song doggerel that is quite deceptive: Try to parse it and you’re lost; let it wash over you however, and you will be drawn inexorably into a world that turns every notion of home, safety and comfort inside out." Ben Brantley of The New York Times argued that the playwright "intelligently keeps the line between victim and predator cloudy. The Skriker is a natural force corrupted by a denaturized world." While describing the play as unwieldy, Brantley wrote that "like the best fairy tales, it directly addresses the darker passages of the unconscious." Ralf Erik Remshardt of Theatre Journal wrote that the titular character's language contains "some of Churchill's most powerful and poetic writing".

Marissa Oberlander of Chicago Reader agreed with 2012 director Eric Hoff that in the play "you find yourself facing your demons while they stare back at you. The skriker's Joycean babble is sometimes more rhythmic than coherent, but, paired with Myah Shein's sinister choreography, it certainly loosened my grasp on reality." David Chadderton wrote that "for me the obscurity was a bit much to take in for a piece that ran a good quarter hour over the 1 hour 40 advertised time with no interval. While technically impressive, if you come out understanding more than half of the play, you've probably done better than me. And possibly than the playwright, if Wing-Davey is to be believed." Jon Kaplan, who saw a 2014 production by Daniel Pagett, argued in Now that Churchill embeds a "bubbling pot of themes in language that's challenging, impressionistic and occasionally dense, using wit and associative wordplay to move the ideas forward." While noting that the play is considered very difficult to stage, Kaplan wrote that Pagett "proves that in the right hands, it's one of her most theatrically exciting scripts."

Lisa Brock wrote in Star Tribune that the playwright creates a "richly textured language for the Skriker [...] a giddy piece of sinister nonsense." In Ithaca Times, Ross Haarstad described the text as "threaded with deliciously impossible stage directions [...] that open up vistas of stage possibilities". Matt Roberts of Cherwell wrote, "I have known plays lapse into surrealism [...] and perhaps even sheer illogicalness, however it is rare for a play to do this as smartly, bitingly or frisson-inducing-ly as The Skriker". However, Roberts also argued that "the depiction of the reality within which this monster operated felt somewhat empty [...]. There was no effective change in the environment in which the action took place, and thus the play lacked the sense of a narrative thread – it darted from emotion to emotion with great efficacy, but when it came to pushing home the actual changes in the lives of Allen and Redfern, I felt disconnected from their suffering and from their reality."

Susannah Clapp of The Guardian awarded Sarah Frankcom's 2015 production four out of five stars, praising the play as prescient and calling the titular character "one of the primary figures of modern theatre." Clapp stated that the work feels like the godmother "of theatrical dystopias. Of dark fragmentary dramas, which dip in and out of underworlds", such as Simon Stephens' Carmen Disruption or Alistair McDowall's Pomona. Stephen Dalton of The Hollywood Reporter lauded the titular character as "a terrific creation [...] this densely layered staccato wordplay is a signature of Churchill's canon and always adheres to a loose narrative logic." The critic also wrote, "Two decades on, The Skriker remains evasive and unwieldy as conventional drama, but still casts a powerful spell as a nightmarish fairy tale." Natasha Tripney of The Stage awarded it four out of five stars in 2015, and the work was described as an "early classic" in Churchill's output by Time Out.
