= Here We Go =

Here We Go may refer to:

== Music ==
=== Albums ===
- Here We Go! (Arashi album), 2002
- Here We Go... (Chanty Savage album), 1994
- Here We Go (US5 album) or the title song, 2005
- Here We Go, by Dschinghis Khan, 2020
- Here We Go, by Soul Control, 2004
- Here We Go, by The Sunny Cowgirls, 2016
- Here We Go!, by Walk off the Earth, 2019
- Here We Go (EP), by 28 Days, 2000

=== Songs ===
- "Here We Go" (John Paul Young song), 1977
- "Here We Go" (Moonbaby song), 2000
- "Here We Go" (NSYNC song), 1997
- "Here We Go" (Stakka Bo song), 1993
- "Here We Go" (Trina song), 2005
- "Here We Go" (football chant), sung at British association football matches
- "Here We Go (Let's Rock & Roll)", by C+C Music Factory, 1991
- "Here We Go", by Bowling for Soup from the film Scooby-Doo 2: Monsters Unleashed, 2004
- "Here We Go", by Hard Rock Sofa and Swanky Tunes, 2012
- "Here We Go", by Jason Gochin from the film Digimon: The Movie, 2000
- "Here We Go", by Joe Walsh and Barnstorm from Barnstorm, 1972
- "Here We Go", by Lower Than Atlantis from the album Lower Than Atlantis, 2014
- "Here We Go", by May J., 2006
- "Here We Go", by Minnie Riperton from Love Lives Forever, 1980
- "Here We Go!", by Missile Innovation, 2006
- "Here We Go", by PeR, representing Latvia in the Eurovision Song Contest 2013
- "Here We Go", by Robyn from Robyn Is Here, 1995
- "Here We Go", by Roger Wood, fight song of the Pittsburgh Steelers, 1994
- "Here We Go", by Shelter from Mantra, 1995
- "Here We Go", by Sleeping With Sirens from Feel, 2013
- "Here We Go", by Stat Quo, 2007
- "Here We Go (Uh Oh)", by Coco Jones from Why Not More?, 2025

== Other uses ==
- Here We Go (play), a 2015 play by Caryl Churchill
- Here We Go (TV series), a British sitcom
- Here WeGo, a maps and navigation application
- "Here we go!", a tagline used by Italian sports journalist Fabrizio Romano

== See also ==
- Here We Go Again (disambiguation)
- Here I Go (disambiguation)
