= A Number (disambiguation) =

A Number is a 2002 English play by Caryl Churchill.

A Number may also refer to:

- A number, mathematical object
- A-Number, or calling party, the person who initiates a telephone call
- A-Number, Alien Registration Number/Alien Number, a unique seven-, eight- or nine-digit number assigned to an alien by the United States Department of Homeland Security
