= Owners (play) =

1972 play by Caryl Churchill

- Written by: Caryl Churchill
- Original language: English

Premiere
- Date premiered: 6 December 1972
- Place premiered: Royal Court Theatre Upstairs, London

Owners is a 1972 play by British playwright Caryl Churchill. It was first performed at the Royal Court Theatre's Theatre Upstairs in a production directed by Nicholas Wright. The play is a satire of property rights about real estate and of the people who own real estate and those who live in rented accommodation.

Owners was Churchill's first professionally produced stage play, and she has described the play as a turning-point in her career as a dramatist: "Since Owners I've worked almost entirely in the theatre. So my working life feels divided quite sharply into before and after 1972, and Owners was the first play of the second part."

In New Haven Register, E. Kyle Minor described Owners as an "intermittently interesting and otherwise tedious" work that was written before Churchill had become a genius of theater. Sylviane Gold of The New York Times stated that "she had yet to achieve the formal mastery that would make later plays like “Cloud Nine” and “Top Girls” instant modernist classics", but argued that Churchill's "acidic critique of capitalist freebooters and the culture that worships them as heroes carries even more resonance today than it did in 1972".

The play was revived at Jermyn Street Theatre in 2023 directed by the theatre's Artistic Director Stella Powell-Jones.
