= Serious Money =

1987 play by Caryl Churchill

- Original language: English
- Written by: Caryl Churchill
- Music by: Ian Dury
- Subject: The world of arbitrageurs, junk bonds and greenmail, white knights and corporate raiders
- Genre: Comedy, satire
- Setting: 1980s, London and New York

Premiere
- Date: 1987
- Place: Royal Court Theatre; London, England

Serious Money is a satirical play written by Caryl Churchill first staged in London in 1987. Its subject is the British stock market, specifically the London International Financial Futures and Options Exchange (LIFFE). Often considered one of Churchill's finest plays along with Cloud 9 (1979) and Top Girls (1982), it is notable for being largely written in rhyming couplets.

== Plot summary ==
The plot follows Scilla and Jake who are enjoying the pleasures and the comforts of the upper class. But the story climaxes when Jake Todd turns up murdered during the first few scenes due to his underground trading.

Scilla takes it upon herself to find her brother's killer and the money he was dealing. She later finds out that he was being investigated by the Department of Trade and Industry. Though she does not find the killer, she finds the American business woman Marylou Banes with whom Jake was dealing. Marylou Banes offers her a fresh start. The story takes place around the stock market troubles in Britain.

Aside from that a second story follows Billy Corman's and Zac Zackerman's attempt to take over the Albion company from Duckett. In between this takeover Corman attempts to get Jacinta Condor and Nigel Ajibala [who are the foreigners with an interest in his takeover] to buy shares in his company. They support Corman but decide to give their bid to Duckett in the end.

The plot ends with Greville Todd in jail, Corman appointed as a Lord, and Scilla happily working for Marylou Banes.

== Productions ==
Serious Money was developed at the Royal Court Theatre in London, directed by Max Stafford-Clark. It opened in March 1987 and was an immediate hit. After its initial engagement it transferred to Wyndham's Theatre in the West End, where it enjoyed an extended run.

Serious Money was produced on Broadway, opening on February 9, 1988, at the Royale Theatre. Some changes were made for the Broadway run, including a reference to the stock market crash of 1987. The show closed after 21 previews and 15 performances.

The play has fared better at American regional companies, such as the Berkeley Repertory Theatre in California. A successful revival was given at the U.K.'s Birmingham Repertory Theatre in 2009.

On July 31, 2010 Serious Money opened at the Shaw Festival in Niagara-on-the-Lake, ON, directed by Eda Holmes.

A run of Serious Money was put on by students of Bristol Old Vic Theatre School at Circomedia, Portland Square from 7 November 2013 until 16 November 2013.

== Awards and nominations ==
=== Awards ===
Year	Award	Category	Result
1987	Laurence Olivier Awards	Best New Play	Won
1988	Obie Awards	Best New American Play	Won
