= See You on the Other Side =

See You on the Other Side is a stock phrase for farewells, especially ones where the parties may not meet each other again.

See You on the Other Side may also refer to:

- See You on the Other Side (Korn album)
- See You on the Other Side (Mercury Rev album)
- "See You on the Other Side", a song by Ozzy Osbourne from his 1995 album Ozzmosis
- "See You on the Other Side", a song by BT from his album This Binary Universe
- "See You on the Other Side", a song by Morgan Cryar from his album Kingdom Upside Down
- See You on the Other Side, a 2026 novel by Jay Mcinerney
