= Fen (play) =

1983 play by Caryl Churchill

- Written by: Caryl Churchill
- Original language: English
- Subject: Class conflict, gender

Premiere
- Date premiered: 24 May 1983
- Place premiered: The Public Theater

Fen is a 1983 play by Caryl Churchill. While not as well known as Churchill works like Cloud 9 (1979) and Top Girls (1982), it has been praised by many critics. One of its inspirations was the 1975 book by Mary Chamberlain Fenwomen: A Portrait of Women in an English Village which also provided the words for one of the songs and other phrases and images.

== Summary ==
Caryl Churchill’s Fen follows the lives of rural female farmworkers in the English swampland known as “Fens”. The play follows their lives through their hardships as they attempt to make a living with what is provided. Val, the central figure of the play, is a wife and mother who chooses to leave her family to pursue her love with a farmer named Frank. Throughout the play, Val faces pressure from herself and society, ultimately leading to her downfall. She is haunted by the fact that she left her children behind, yet feels as though she financially cannot bring them to live with her and Frank. Feeling as though she cannot take it anymore, she asks Frank to kill her, and he complies. After her death, Val delivers a monologue explaining the ghosts of the fens, and how she is now haunting the land with them. Her character serves as a metaphor for people who become trapped in a life they didn’t want. Other characters within the play include Angela, a stepmother who feels like an outsider, resulting in her abusing her stepdaughter, Becky. Nell, a strongwilled and defiant woman who is trying to assert her rights against the landowners for better working conditions. Shirley, a woman who keeps going no matter what, and Alice, who has found peace in religion. Each character within the piece represents the hardships and struggle of women in labor jobs. They are treated poorly, taken advantage of by the male landowners, and left to pick up the pieces of a broken system. Concord Theatricals describes this play as a show about “A community with strong links with the past but living in a present where the land is owned by multinationals”. The play premiered at the University of Essex performed by the Joint Stock Theater Group in 1983.

== Reception ==
After viewing the Joint Stock Theatre Group performance at The Public Theater, John Beaufort of The Christian Science Monitor billed Fen as "a fascinating mosaic in theatrical terms." Beaufort praised "the authenticity of its material, the skill with which the elements have been drawn together by Miss Churchill, and the performance of a remarkable troupe." In The New York Times, Frank Rich described the play as "dour, difficult and [...] never coy about its rather stridently doctrinaire socialism: it's the most stylistically consistent of Miss Churchill's plays and at times the most off-putting. It is also yet another confirmation that its author possesses one of the boldest theatrical imaginations to emerge in this decade." The critic wrote that Churchill's "concentrated dramatization of their lives has an open, poetic intensity that transcends the flat tendentiousness of mere agitprop."

In 2004, Paul Taylor of The Independent argued of the play, "It's amazing how much detail and insight Churchill manages to pack into a succession of spare, short scenes that here succeed each other with a heightened, dream-like fluency. The effect is a haunting blend of intimacy (often dourly comic) and (with roles deliberately cast regardless of age and looks) objectifying defamiliarisation." In 2011, academic Jill Dolan wrote that Fen "represents the British feminist playwright at her best". She praised set pieces such as the dirt covering the playing area: "Even when scenes move to various characters’ homes or other social settings, the dirt remains, a palpable reminder that these people are always mired in the manual labor that provides their only livelihood." The critic argued that "Churchill doesn’t lay individual blame, but constructs a social constellation in which each character is interdependent with the others, even if their access to power and wealth differently marks their experience." Dolan wrote that "Fen is wrenching because even in the midst of such lack, the characters do dream. Val isn’t the only woman with desires; they’re all simply at different stages of reconciling to the fact that they’ll never be fulfilled."

Tom Wicker of Exeunt praised the play as "unsentimental and richly written". Wicker praised the set design as evocative and also stated that the dialogue "is suitably earthy, enriched with colloquialisms and nuggets of folklore that turn the play into something more interesting and freestanding than the straightforward diatribe against early ‘80s capitalism it threatens to be at the start." In The Guardian, Lyn Gardner described Fen as a "mysterious, tantalising play that, with its elliptical scenes and multiple characters, refuses to spoon-feed its audience. It offers a clear-eyed, feminist-socialist perspective on women and labour, but there is something darker and wilder lurking in its witchy psychic landscape." Gardner dubbed the work "a reminder that British theatre has produced no more a courageous writer or one who mines our dark, damaged psyches with such forensic thoughtfulness as Churchill."

Don Aucoin of The Boston Globe reviewed the 2012 Factory Theatre performance positively, stating (with regards to the phrase "class warfare") that "Churchill has always understood which side is the aggressor. That comprehension, fortified by Churchill’s strongly feminist outlook, undergirds her desolate and gripping 1983 drama 'Fen.'" Aucoin described the work as "a series of brief but indelible vignettes" and viewed Val as the play's most poignant figure, arguing that her actions are believable given her extreme circumstances.
