= Front Row (album) =

Live album by David Meece
- Released: 1982
- Recorded: 1982 live at The Lincoln Center (Fort Collins, Colorado)
- Genre: Christian
- Length: 45:16
- Label: Myrrh
- Producer: Brown Bannister

David Meece chronology
Are You Ready? (1980)	Front Row (1982)	Count the Cost (1983)

Front Row is David Meece's fifth album. It was recorded live in 1982 at Fort Collins, Colorado.

== Track listing ==
All tracks are written by David Meece; except where noted.

Side one
No.	Title	Writer(s)	Length
1.	"Heaven Knows"	Dan Walsh, Harvey Price	2:35
2.	"Jesus"		4:31
3.	"Rattle Me, Shake Me"	Nancy Honeytree	4:30
4.	"Mother, Muffler, Mozart & The Beatles"	Wolfgang Amadeus Mozart, John Lennon, Paul McCartney	6:28
5.	"All The Time"		4:13
6.	"Never Gonna Serve Anyone Else But You"		2:40

Side two
No.	Title	Writer(s)	Length
1.	"Gospel Train"		4:13
2.	"Comin' Back"		3:12
3.	"Crucifixion: There Once Lived a Man / Intermezzo / Ten Thousand Angels / The Bystander / Were You There / We Are the Reason"	David Meece, Ray Overholt	15:56

== Personnel ==
=== Musicians ===
- David Meece – lead vocals, acoustic piano
- Shane Keister – keyboards, synthesizers
- Jon Goin – guitars
- Brent Rowan – guitars
- Craig Nelson – bass
- Keith Edwards – drums
- Farrell Morris – percussion
- Mark Morris – percussion
- Billy Puett – saxophones, woodwinds
- Buddy Skipper – saxophones
- Denis Solee – saxophones, woodwinds
- Roger Bissell – trombone
- George Tidwell – trumpet
- Kim Fleming – backing vocals
- Donna McElroy – backing vocals
- Glenda Smith White – backing vocals

=== Technical ===
- Michael Blanton – executive producer
- Brown Bannister – producer
- Malcolm Harper – recording
- Jack Joseph Puig – engineer
- Bob Clark – remix engineer at Great Circle Sound (Nashville, Tennessee)
- Glenn Meadows – mastering at Masterfonics (Nashville, Tennessee)
- Barnes & Company – album design
- Larry Dixon – photography
