= Everybody Needs a Little Help =

Studio album by David Meece
- Released: 1978
- Studio: Goldmine Recording Studios (Ventura, California)
- Genre: Christian
- Label: Myrrh
- Producer: Brown Bannister

David Meece chronology
I Just Call On You (1977)	Everybody Needs a Little Help (1978)	Are You Ready? (1980)

Everybody Needs a Little Help was David Meece's third album, currently out-of-print.

== Track listing ==
All songs written by David Meece, except where noted.

Side 1

1. "I Can't Believe It's True" - 2:59
2. "God Holds The Future" (Meece, Brown Bannister) - 3:56
3. "Never Gonna Serve Anyone Else" - 3:16
4. "Everybody Needs A Little Help" - 3:52
5. "All The Time" - 4:26

Side 2

1. "Love Is The Reason (We're Here Tonight)" - 3:58
2. "All I Can Do" - 3:00
3. "Sunshine Jesus" - 2:53
4. "Oh, So Wonderful" - 3:42
5. "He'll Take Care Of You" - 2:55

== Personnel ==
- David Meece – lead vocals, backing vocals, keyboards
- Shane Keister – keyboards
- Bobby Ogdin – keyboards
- Larry Byrom – guitars
- Jon Goin – guitars
- Chris Smith – guitars
- Steve Schaffer – bass
- Jack Williams – bass
- Kenny Buttrey – drums
- Roger Clark – drums
- Kenny Malone – drums
- Terry McMillan – percussion
- Farrell Morris – percussion
- Quittman Dennis – saxophone
- Buddy Skipper – horn arrangements
- Bergen White – string arrangements
- Gary Pigg – backing vocals (4)
- Marie Tomlinson – backing vocals (5, 6, 8)
- Barbara Wyrick – backing vocals (5, 6, 8)

== Production ==
- Michael Blanton – executive producer
- Brown Bannister – producer, engineer
- Glenn Meadows – mastering at Masterfonics (Nashville, TN)
- Hot Graphics – cover design
- John Miller – photography
