= David Lan =

South African-born British playwright and theatre director

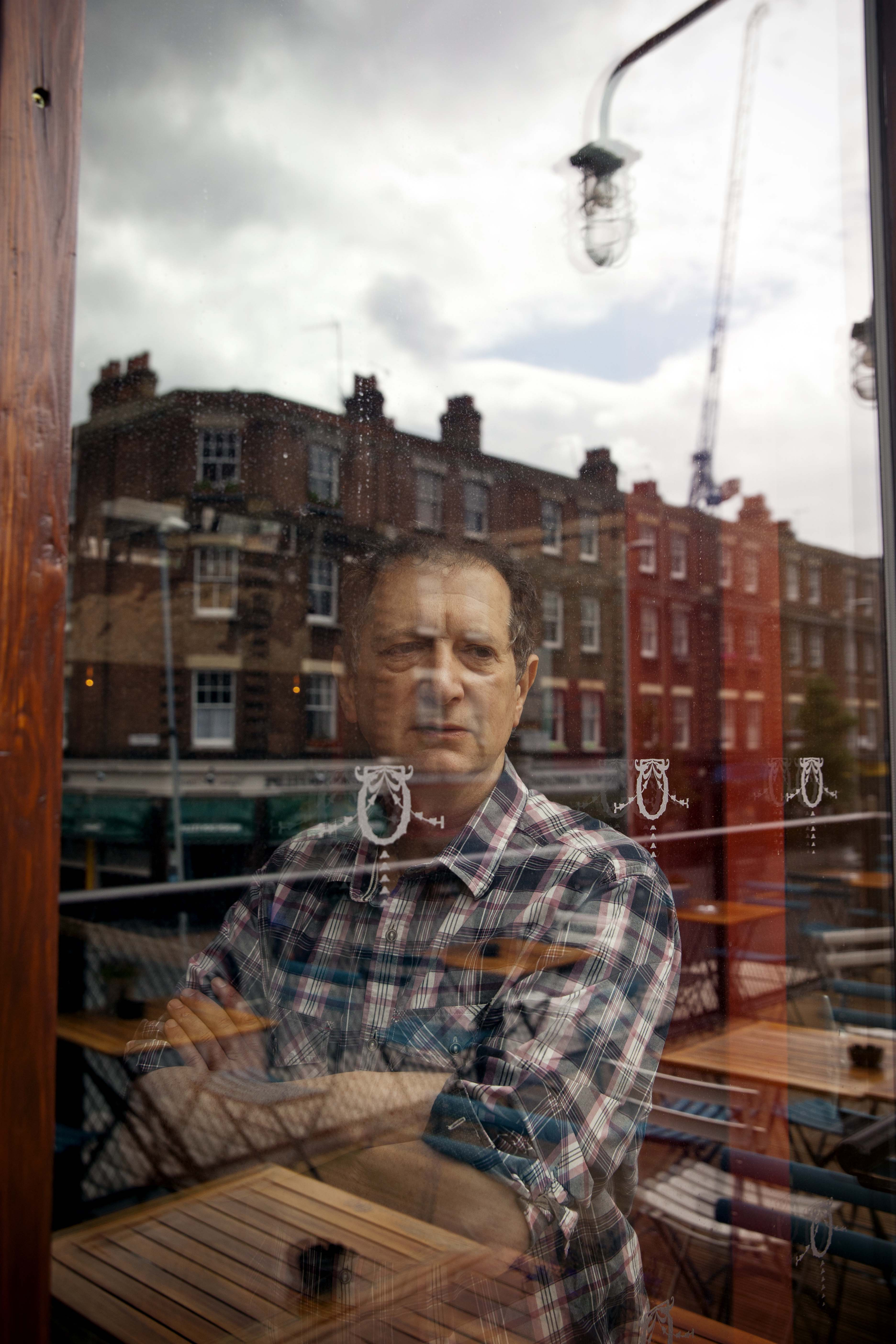
David Lan. Photo by David Sandison.

David Lan CBE is a South African-born British playwright, theatre producer and director, and social anthropologist.

== Career ==
Born in Cape Town, he trained as an actor and gained a BA at the University of Cape Town. He has lived in London since 1972, apart from two years in Zimbabwe 1980–1982. He was awarded a BSc first class (1976) and a PhD (1984) in Social Anthropology from LSE, with his thesis Making history: spirit mediums and the guerilla war in the Dande area of Zimbabwe.

He was the writer in residence at the Royal Court Theatre from 1995 to 1997.

He was the artistic director of the Young Vic theatre in London from 2000 until 2018.

At the Young Vic, he led the campaign to rebuild the theatre (architects Haworth Tompkins) which reopened to acclaim in October 2006. He also led the 24 shows in 31 cities 'Walkabout' season during the 2-year rebuild.

He has produced more than 200 shows.

He initiated the Genesis Directors' Project, the Jerwood Directors Award and the Young Vic Award.

In addition to his many plays, libretti, and films, he published an anthropological study after two years of field research in the Zambezi Valley in the extreme north of Zimbabwe. Guns and Rain: Guerrillas & Spirit Mediums in Zimbabwe (1985) describes the influence of religious practice on Zimbabwe's struggle for independence from colonial rule. It has been described as 'an undisputed modern classic' and is taught in universities all over the world. Some of his stage works reflect his interest in politics and religion, including spirit possession and cargo cults.

He wrote screenplays for the features ‘Dark City’ and ‘Streets of Yesterday’ and wrote, directed and produced documentaries for the BBC made in Mozambique, Namibia and Nigeria, and also a 'fly on the wall' account of the redesign of the Royal Court Theatre which he filmed himself over the course of a year.

He was co-director of the 'Young Genius' season at the Barbican in 2005 and of 'World Stages London' at theatres across London in 2012.

In 2010 he co-founded the What Next? alliance of arts organisations which now has 35 chapters across the UK.

He is on the boards of Sadlers Wells, the Belarus Free Theatre, the Genesis Foundation and the Genesis Theatre Design Programme. He is co-chair of the International Council of the Isango Ensemble of South Africa and Patron of the theatre at the Mulberry School.

Between 2013 and 2016 he was Consulting Artistic Director of the soon to be completed Ronald O. Perelman Performing Arts Center at the World Trade Center in New York, where he is now an artistic associate.

In his final season at the Young Vic, all five shows that he produced received five star reviews. These were ‘The Suppliant Women’, ‘The Jungle’, ‘The Brothers Size‘, ‘The Inheritance‘ and ‘Fun Home’. ‘The Jungle’ and ‘The Inheritance‘ both transferred to the West End and won more than 25 major awards in the UK and the US including multiple Oliviers, Tonys, Evening Standards, Critics Circle and Drama Desk awards as well as South Bank Sky Arts Awards in successive years.

He was Theatre Associate at the Brooklyn Academy of Music in New York 2020/2021 where he produced, with ITA, Simon Stone's adaptation of ‘Medea’ by Euripides directed by Stone with Rose Byrne and Bobby Cannavale.

His memoir ‘As If By Chance: Journeys, Theatres, Lives’ was published by Faber & Faber in February 2020.

He and Tracey Seaward are co-directors of The Walk Productions which produced ‘The Walk’, Gaziantep to Manchester, July to November 2021 in association with Good Chance and Handspring as well as subsequent journeys to The Hague, Poland, Ukraine, Amsterdam, across the U.K. and a 3-week visit to New York City by Amal, the 12 ft puppet of a 10 year old Syrian refugee girl. ‘The Walk’ received the 2021 Time Out Best Public Theatre Award.

== Works ==
=== Plays ===
- The Land of the Living (2025) National Theatre
- Ion, libretto for the opera by Param Vir (2000) Aldeburgh
- Tobias and the Angel, libretto for the opera by Jonathan Dove (1999 Almeida Theatre, 2006 Young Vic)
- The Ends of the Earth (1996) National Theatre
- "Charley Tango" (1995) BBC Radio 4 and World Service
- Desire (1990) Almeida Theatre
- A Mouthful of Birds, with Caryl Churchill (1986) Joint Stock/Royal Court
- Flight (1986) RSC
- Sergeant Ola And His Followers (1979) Royal Court
- Red Earth (1978) ICA
- The Winter Dancers (1977) Royal Court
- Not in Norwich (1977) Royal Court
- Paradise (1975) Royal Court
- Homage To Bean Soup (1975) Royal Court
- Painting A Wall (1974) Almost Free Theatre
- Bird Child (1974) Royal Court

=== Translations ===
- "The Magic Flute" translation of the opera libretto (2009) Isango/Young Vic
- The Cherry Orchard, translation of the play by Anton Chekhov (2001) National Theatre
- La Lupa translation of the play by Giovanni Verga (2000) RSC
- Uncle Vanya, translation of the play by Anton Chekhov (1998) RSC/Young Vic
- Ion, translation of the play by Euripides (1994) RSC
- Hippolytos, translation of the play by Euripides (1991) Almeida Theatre
- Ghetto, translation of the play by Joshua Sobol (1989) National Theatre

=== Films ===
- The Sunday Judge (1985) Writer BBC, filmed in Mozambique
- Dark City (1990) Writer BBC Films, filmed in South Africa
- Welcome Home Comrades (1990) Writer BBC, filmed in Namibia
- Artist Unknown (1995) Writer, producer, director BBC Omnibus, filmed in Nigeria
- Royal Court Diaries (1996) Cameraman, director, co-producer BBC Omnibus

=== Productions as director include ===
- “Why It’s Kicking Off Everywhere” based on the book by Paul Mason (2017)
- "Blackta" by Nathaniel Martello-White (2012)
- "Joe Turner's Come and Gone" by August Wilson (2010)
- "As You Like It" by Shakespeare (2006)
- "The Skin of Our Teeth" by Thornton Wilder (2004)
- A Raisin in the Sun" by Lorraine Hansberry (2003 and 2005)
- "The Daughter-in-Law" by D H Lawrence (2002)
- Doctor Faustus by Christopher Marlowe (2002)
- "Julius Caesar" by Shakespeare (2000)
- 'Tis Pity She's a Whore by John Ford (1999)
- "The Glass Menagerie" by Tennessee Williams (1998)

=== Publications ===
Guns and Rain: Guerrillas and Spirit Mediums in Zimbabwe 1985, re-issued in Zimbabwe 2018

Selected Plays 1999

As If By Chance: Journeys, Theatres, Lives 2020, paperback 2021

== Awards and honours ==
On graduating from the LSE he received the Raymond Firth Award.

For his writing he received the John Whiting Award and the George Orwell Award.

In 2004, he received the Laurence Olivier Award for Outstanding Achievement in an Affiliate Theatre for the entire Young Vic season.

The re-design and rebuild of the Young Vic, for which he wrote the brief and which took place under his leadership, was named RIBA London Building of the Year 2007 and was short-listed for the Stirling Prize as well as winning many other awards.

His productions of plays, operas and musicals have received multiple Olivier, Evening Standard, Critics' Circle, South Bank Sky Arts (theatre and opera), Tony, Drama Desk, Drama League and Obie Awards.

In 2010 he was awarded an honorary D.Litt. for services to theatre and community by the University of the South Bank.

In the 2014 Birthday Honours, he was appointed a Commander of the Order of the British Empire (CBE) for services to theatre.

In the 2016 survey in The Stage of the 100 most influential people in the UK theatre he was ranked 6th.

Following the announcement of his departure from the Young Vic, he was presented with the inaugural Critics' Circle Special Award for Services to Theatre.

Also in 2018 he received the Laurence Olivier Special Award in recognition of his 'outstanding contribution in leading the Young Vic since 2000, his work within the local community around the theatre, and his commitment to internationalism and diversity.

Of his two productions that played on Broadway, ‘A View from the Bridge’ (2016) won Tony Awards for Best Revival and Best Director and ‘The Inheritance’ (2019) won for Best Play, Best Director, Best Actor and Best Supporting Actress.

He received the 2018 Marsh ‘Anthropology in the World’ Award given by the Royal Anthropological Institute. The citation read ‘David is a polymath parallel who has built connections between the world of the social sciences, inter-continental understandings and the humanities and performing arts. He has applied these talents while leading theatre companies both artistically and practically with their building projects. David first trained as an actor before beginning to write and direct for the theatre. When he moved to London in the 1970s, he took a degree in Social Anthropology, followed by a PhD which would be published in 1985 as Guns and Rain: Guerrillas and Spirit Mediums in Zimbabwe, an original study of the role of rural, religious practitioners in the struggle to bring an end to the Rhodesian racist regime. The book made an enormous impact at the time and thirty years later has become an undisputed modern classic. Following his PhD, David travelled extensively in Africa writing films and drama documentaries for the BBC and continuing to write plays for major companies and venues. David has connected scholarship, and geographical and cultural differences with complete disregard for conventional boundaries: educating through performance and taking every opportunity to help younger and less well-placed artists at each stage of a career that is currently at its height. He is a fine example of practising the characteristics of an anthropological informed mindset appraising the contemporary world.’

He was co-producer of ‘The Walk - Little Amal’ which was named as the No 1 theatre event of 2021 in London by the Observer, received the Time Out London Award for the Best Public Theatre event 2021 and was named by Time Out New York as the best art exhibit of 2022, as well as one of the best theatre events of 2022 by the New York Times. Amal has received the Livingstone Award of the Royal Scottish Geographical Society for services to humanity.

== See also ==
- List of British playwrights since 1950
