= David Meece =

American contemporary Christian musician (born 1952)

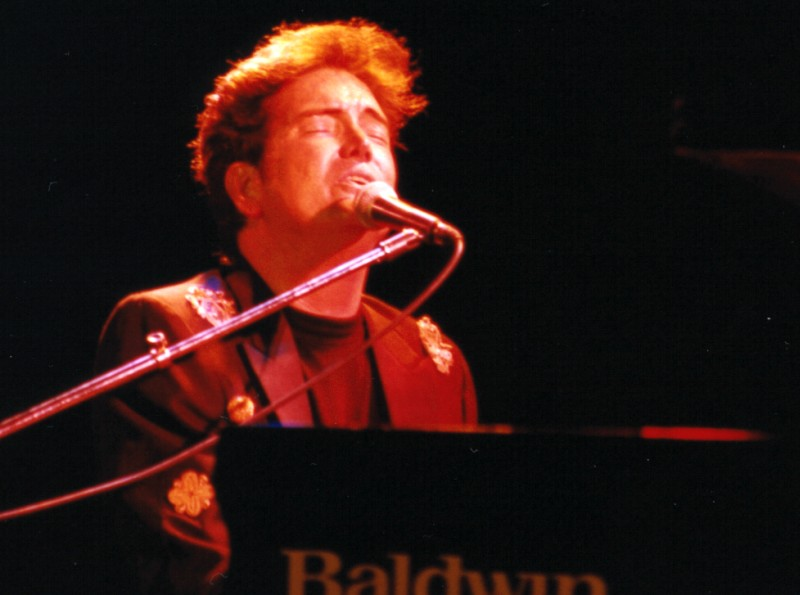
- Meece performing in Edmonton, Alberta

Background information
- Born: May 26, 1952 (age 74)
- Origin: Humble, Texas, U.S.
- Genres: Contemporary Christian music
- Occupations: Singer, songwriter
- Instruments: Piano, keyboard
- Years active: 1976–present
- Website: davidmeece.com

David Meece (born May 26, 1952) is an American contemporary Christian musician who enjoyed success in the mid-1980s and into the early 2010s, with more than thirty Top 10 hits, including several No. 1 songs.

== Education ==
Meece grew up in Humble, Texas, with an abusive and alcoholic father. David found solace in playing piano and by his mid-teens he was touring in Europe and the US.

David Meece went on to study music at Peabody Conservatory of Music in Baltimore, where he met his wife Debbie, who played viola. While attending Peabody, he experienced a religious conversion and devoted his life to Jesus. He became a youth pastor and began writing songs reflecting his Christian beliefs, adding classical influences to pop melodies.

== Music career ==
Meece came to the attention of the Christian music label Myrrh Records, and in 1976 they released his debut album, David. He released ten albums between 1976 and 1993, becoming a major figure in the Christian music industry. Meece is perhaps best known for his song "We Are the Reason", which has been recorded by more than 200 other artists, and sung in several languages. His song "Seventy Times Seven" peaked at No. 77 on the Australian Charts. He worked with Canadian songwriter and producer Gino Vannelli for his albums Chronology and Candle In the Rain.

Possibly due to his conservatory training, Meece uses pieces of classical piano works as intros or settings for many of his songs. For example, in the song "This Time" from the album Learning to Trust, the opening section (as well as the bridge and ending tag) is from Frédéric Chopin's "Revolutionary Etude" (Op. 10, No. 12) in C minor. Also, the song "Falling Down" from the album Count the Cost is based on a sonata by Mozart. The introductory melody for "You Can Go", from the album 7, is taken from the Two-Part Invention No. 13 in A Minor (BWV 784) by Johann Sebastian Bach. Because of the prevalent use of synthesizers, "You Can Go" is sometimes incorrectly connected to an advertisement in the early 1980s for the Commodore 64; the ad used the Bach Invention played by a synthesizer.

Meece was asked to appear in Billy Graham crusades, among other outreach groups and television broadcasts. He was inducted into the Christian Music Hall of Fame on June 14, 2008, and received the 2009 Visionary Award in the Inspirational Male Soloist category.

In May 2012, the National Academy of Television Arts and Sciences announced that the song "Hands of Hope" earned Meece, Cook and Carroll an Emmy nomination for Best Arrangement/Composer of a Television Theme Song.

== Discography ==
- David (1976)
- I Just Call on You (1977)
- Everybody Needs a Little Help (1978)
- Are You Ready? (1980)
- Front Row (1982)
- Count the Cost (1983)
- 7 (1985)
- Chronology (1986)
- Candle In The Rain (1987)
- Learning To Trust (1989)
- Once in a Lifetime (1993)
- Odyssey (1995)
- Send Down The Rain (1995) – unreleased
- There I Go Again (2002)
- David Meece: The Definitive Collection (2007)
- Hands of Hope (2012)
- The Ultimate Collection (2014)
