= Here We Go Again =

Here We Go Again may refer to:

== Film and television ==
- Here We Go Again (film), a 1942 American comedy film
- Here We Go Again (1973 TV series), an American sitcom starring Larry Hagman
- Here We Go Again (2016 TV series), an American sitcom starring LaToya Luckett and Wendy Raquel Robinson
- Mamma Mia! Here We Go Again, a 2018 British-American jukebox musical film sequel based on the music of ABBA

== Music ==
=== Albums ===
- Here We Go Again (Demi Lovato album) or the title song (see below), 2009
- Here We Go Again (pureNRG album) or the title song, 2008
- Here We Go Again (SR-71 album) or the title song, 2004
- Here We Go Again! (album), by the Kingston Trio, 1959
- Here We Go Again: Celebrating the Genius of Ray Charles, a tribute album by Willie Nelson, Wynton Marsalis, and Norah Jones, 2011
- Here We Go Again, or the title song, by Joey McIntyre, 2009
- Here We Go Again, by Red Steagall, 2007
- Here We Go Again, an EP by the Mighty Mighty Bosstones, 1995

=== Songs ===
- "Here We Go Again" (Aretha Franklin song), 1998
- "Here We Go Again" (Demi Lovato song), 2009
- "Here We Go Again" (Glenn Miller song), 1944
- "Here We Go Again" (Governor song), 2010
- "Here We Go Again" (Ray Charles song), 1967; covered by several performers
- "Here We Go Again" (Sigma song), 2019
- "Here We Go Again! (song)" by Portrait, 1992
- "Here We Go Again", by Danger Mouse and Jemini from Ghetto Pop Life, 2003
- "Here We Go Again", by Dave Mason and Cass Elliot from Dave Mason & Cass Elliot, 1971
- "Here We Go Again", by DJ Jazzy Jeff & The Fresh Prince from He's the DJ, I'm the Rapper, 1988
- "Here We Go Again", by DMX from ... And Then There Was X, 1999
- "Here We Go Again", by the Hives from Barely Legal, 1997
- "Here We Go Again", by John Lennon from Menlove Ave., 1986
- "Here We Go Again", by Laila from Hello Laila, 1998
- "Here We Go Again", by Marshmello from Joytime III, 2019
- "Here We Go Again", by New Found Glory from Tip of the Iceberg, 2008
- "Here We Go Again", by Operation Ivy from Energy, 1989
- "Here We Go Again", by Paramore from All We Know Is Falling, 2005
- "Here We Go Again", by Pixie Lott from Turn It Up, 2009
- "Here We Go Again", by Sara Paxton
- "Here We Go Again", by Subnoize Souljaz from Droppin Bombs, 2006
- "Here We Go Again (Bump 2000)", by Kottonmouth Kings from High Society, 2000
- "Here We Go Again (I Love Lake Tahoe)", by A from Monkey Kong, 1999

== See also ==
- Here We Go (disambiguation)
- Here I Go Again (disambiguation)
- "Here We Go... Again", by the Weeknd, 2022
