= Here I Go =

Here I Go may refer to:

- "Here I Go" (2 Unlimited song), 1995
- "Here I Go" (Syd Barrett song), 1970
- "Here I Go" (The Screaming Jets song), 1993
- "Here I Go" (Infamous Syndicate song), 1999
- "Here I Go" (The Lonely Island song), 2024
- "Here I Go", a song by Public Enemy from There's a Poison Goin' On
- "Here I Go", a demo by Relient K from The Bird and the Bee Sides
- "Here I Go", a song by Mystikal from Mind of Mystikal
- "Here I Go", a song by American rapper Kash Doll from The Vault

== See also ==
- Here I Go Again (disambiguation)
- Here We Go (disambiguation)
- There I Go (disambiguation)
- Toadette, character who says the quote
