= David (David Meece album) =

Studio album by David Meece
- Released: 1976
- Studio: TM Productions (Dallas, Texas)
- Genre: Christian
- Length: 35:10
- Label: Myrrh Records
- Producer: Paul Baker

David Meece chronology
| David (1976) | I Just Call on You (1977) |

Released in 1976, David was the first album for the contemporary Christian music star, David Meece.

== Track listing ==
All songs written by David Meece.

Side 1

1. "I'll Sing This Song For You" - 3:38
2. "Come Home, America" - 2:46
3. "Jesus" - 3:16
4. "I Love The Way He Smiles At Me" - 4:11
5. "I Love You, Lord" - 3:26

Side 2

1. "Touch My Hand" - 3:30
2. "Take Me Together" - 4:53
3. "Got To Know You're There" - 3:41
4. "Imagine What It'd Be Like" - 3:28
5. "I'll Sing This Song For You" (Reprise) (Instrumental) - 2:36

== Personnel ==
- David Meece – vocals, acoustic piano
- Mack Dougherty – acoustic guitar, electric guitars
- Bob Thomas – acoustic guitar
- Lou Fischer – bass
- Paul Leim – drums, percussion
- Bob Piper – arrangements and conductor

== Production ==
- Paul Baker – producer
- Dan Peterson – engineer
- George J. Sevra Jr. – photography
- Dennis Hill – cover design
