= Count the Cost =

Studio album by David Meece
- Released: 1983
- Studio: Caribou Ranch (Nederland, Colorado); Bullet Recording Studio and Sound Stage Studios (Nashville, Tennessee); The Bennett House (Franklin, Tennessee)
- Genre: Christian
- Length: 38:54
- Label: Myrrh
- Producer: Brown Bannister

David Meece chronology
Front Row (1982)	Count the Cost (1983)	7 (1985)

Count The Cost was David Meece's sixth album.

== Track listing ==
All songs written by David Meece, except where noted.

1. "Gloria" - 3:59
2. "Making My Life Brand New" - 4:19
3. "Falling Down" - 3:04
4. "Pressing On" - 3:46
5. "Some People They Never Believe" - 3:22
6. "Count The Cost" (John Thompson, Randy Scruggs) - 2:51
7. "I Don't Know What I'd Do Without You" - 5:10
8. "Today Is The Day" - 2:29
9. "And You Know It's Right" (Meece, Brown Bannister, Michael W. Smith) - 4:25
10. "Replace It With Your Love" - 4:00

== Personnel ==
- David Meece – lead vocals
- Shane Keister – keyboards, synthesizers
- Michael W. Smith – keyboards, synthesizers
- Jon Goin – guitars
- Mike Brignardello – bass
- Paul Leim – drums
- Clyde Brooks – snare drum (9)
- Farrell Morris – percussion
- John Rommel – flugelhorn, piccolo
- Bobby Taylor – English horn
- Alan Moore – arrangements
- Jackie Cusic – backing vocals
- Diana DeWitt – backing vocals
- Kim Fleming – backing vocals
- Donna McElroy – backing vocals
- Gary Pigg – backing vocals

== Production ==
- Michael Blanton – executive producer, management
- Dan Harrell – executive producer, management
- Brown Bannister – producer
- Jack Joseph Puig – engineer
- Don Cobb – assistant engineer
- Doug Sax – mastering at The Mastering Lab (Los Angeles, CA).
- Michael Borum – album photography

== Charts ==
Chart performance for Count the Cost
Chart (1983)	Peak position
US Christian Albums (Billboard)	6
