= Escaped Alone =

2016 play by Caryl Churchill

- Written by: Caryl Churchill
- Original language: English

Premiere
- Date premiered: January 2016
- Place premiered: Royal Court Theatre

Escaped Alone is a 2016 play by Caryl Churchill. Critics' reviews were mostly positive.

== Reception ==
Variety's Matt Trueman praised Escaped Alone, writing that "its juxtaposition of afternoon tea and environmental catastrophe proves particularly potent, not to mention wryly funny." Trueman said of the dialogue between the women, "As idle conversation, it's keenly observed — Churchill's take on talk for talk's sake. Susannah Clapp of The Guardian wrote a positive review and stated, "This is fantasy intricately wired into current politics. It is intimate and vast." She called the monologues "extraordinary". Michael Billington wrote in the same newspaper that Mrs Jarrett's speeches are "less effective as they go along" but praised the garden conversations, praising one exchange as "Churchill at her best, observing with wry compassion how people actually talk". In The Atlantic, Sophie Gilbert asserted that Escaped Alone "is funny, charming, and alarming, encapsulating an impossible amount into its brisk 55-minute running time". Gilbert also said that "its sense of female endurance resonates."

Cameron Woodhead of The Sydney Morning Herald dubbed the play "brilliant" despite having reservations about the performance he saw (at the Red Stitch Actors Theatre), and argued, "Three layers of dramatic action emerge. Light, avoidant surface chat plays over subjective unravelling and personal armageddon, with a black comic buffet of dystopian possibilities erupting from under them. It makes perfect dramatic sense as a kind of reverse pyramid of repression". Jerry Wasserman of the Vancouver Sun praised Escaped Alone as a welcome shift from the realism of much of modern theater and wrote that it is "filled with provocative ideas and entertaining dialogue". Making a comparison of one line to Monty Python, he said the women engage in "often very funny conversation" and that the work "is as rich in implication as its meanings are oblique." Time Out's Andrzej Lukowski lauded the play as a "masterpiece" in a review of a later Churchill work.

Conversely, Stephen Dalton of The Hollywood Reporter praised Macdonald's work as director but called the play itself "familiar ground for Churchill". Writing that the work's "sketchy revelations about its protagonists serve little dramatic purpose, and arrive at no clear resolution", Dalton described Escaped Alone as "a minor late work from a major dramatist". In The Arts Desk, Mary Paula Hunter dismissed the play as "a strange and unsatisfying mix of whimsy and black humor [...] To be truly effective black humor must have us laughing at something we fear, regret, or at the very least recognize. Churchill’s little backyard gathering of retirees is a bizarre confab disconnected from the prosaic". In 2019, The Guardian writers ranked Escaped Alone the eighth-greatest theatrical work since 2000.
