= Here We Go (play) =

2015 play by Caryl Churchill

- Written by: Caryl Churchill
- Original language: English
- Subject: Ageing, death

Premiere
- Date premiered: 27 November 2015
- Place premiered: Royal National Theatre

Here We Go is a 2015 play by Caryl Churchill. Critics' reviews were generally positive.

== Reception ==
Lettie McKie wrote in Londonist that "its brevity does nothing to lessen the gentle emotional power". McKie criticized the dialogue of the funeral scene as stilted "due to Churchill's decision to truncate many of her characters' sentences. Paradoxically, the actors' discomfort shows as they struggle with a trick intended to create naturalism." But the critic described the overall play as "true to life, graceful, and unique". Variety's Matt Trueman said of the final scene ("Getting There"), "Craftily, Churchill coaxes us into contemplating our own mortality." Trueman also called Churchill's writing in the second scene "wry". Mark Lawson of the New Statesman wrote of the finale, "Feeling as if it were staring the audience down, the scene is a terrifyingly unconsoling meditation on the end of life, as if Ingmar Bergman had turned Larkin's 'Aubade' and 'The Old Fools' into a silent movie. [...] I found the play rewardingly sharp and shocking".

Michael Billington of The Guardian wrote: "While initially it seems slight, I find it's grown steadily in the mind since I saw it." He said that the third section ("Getting There") "poignantly captures the ritual humiliations of sickness and age", and dubbed the play "a striking memento mori for an age without faith". Verity Healey of Exeunt argued, "Life seems so brief and yet so expansive. And Churchill's style of writing follows suit with its short, truncated sentences as she untangles, in an essayist fashion, the meaning of existence, its cessation and our helpless but natural struggle against it." Healey said that the "last section, which unravels in dialogue-less repetition, has plenty to say about old age and how time, like sundown, is slow, almost imperceptible yet unstoppable." Rohan Preston billed Here We Go and the later Churchill play Escaped Alone as "slight but potent" works.
