= The After-Dinner Joke =

- Play for Today episode
- Episode no.: Series 8 Episode 17
- Directed by: Colin Bucksey
- Written by: Caryl Churchill
- Original air date: 14 February 1978

Episode chronology
← Previous "Our Day Out"	Next → "Days of Hope"

"The After-Dinner Joke" is the 17th episode of eighth season of the British BBC anthology TV series Play for Today. The episode was a television play that was originally broadcast on 14 February 1978. "The After-Dinner Joke" was written by Caryl Churchill, directed by Colin Bucksey, produced by Margaret Matheson, and starred Paula Wilcox.

Unfolding through a sequence of 66 short, episodic scenes and utilising many characters, the drama explores the politics of charity through the story of a young woman called Selby who wants "to do good." As a charity worker, she studiously avoids becoming embroiled in political issues, only to discover during the course of the action that this is impossible. "There's something political about everything," a local Mayor assures her.

It has also been produced for the stage, including a major revival at the Orange Tree Theatre in Richmond, London, directed by Sophie Boyce in May 2014.

== Cast ==
- Paula Wilcox as Selby
- Richard Vernon as Price
- Clive Merrison as Dent
- Derek Smith as the Mayor

== Sources ==
- Churchill, Caryl. 1990. Shorts. London: Nick Hern Books. ISBN 978-1-85459-085-5.
