= Caryl Churchill =

British playwright (born 1938)

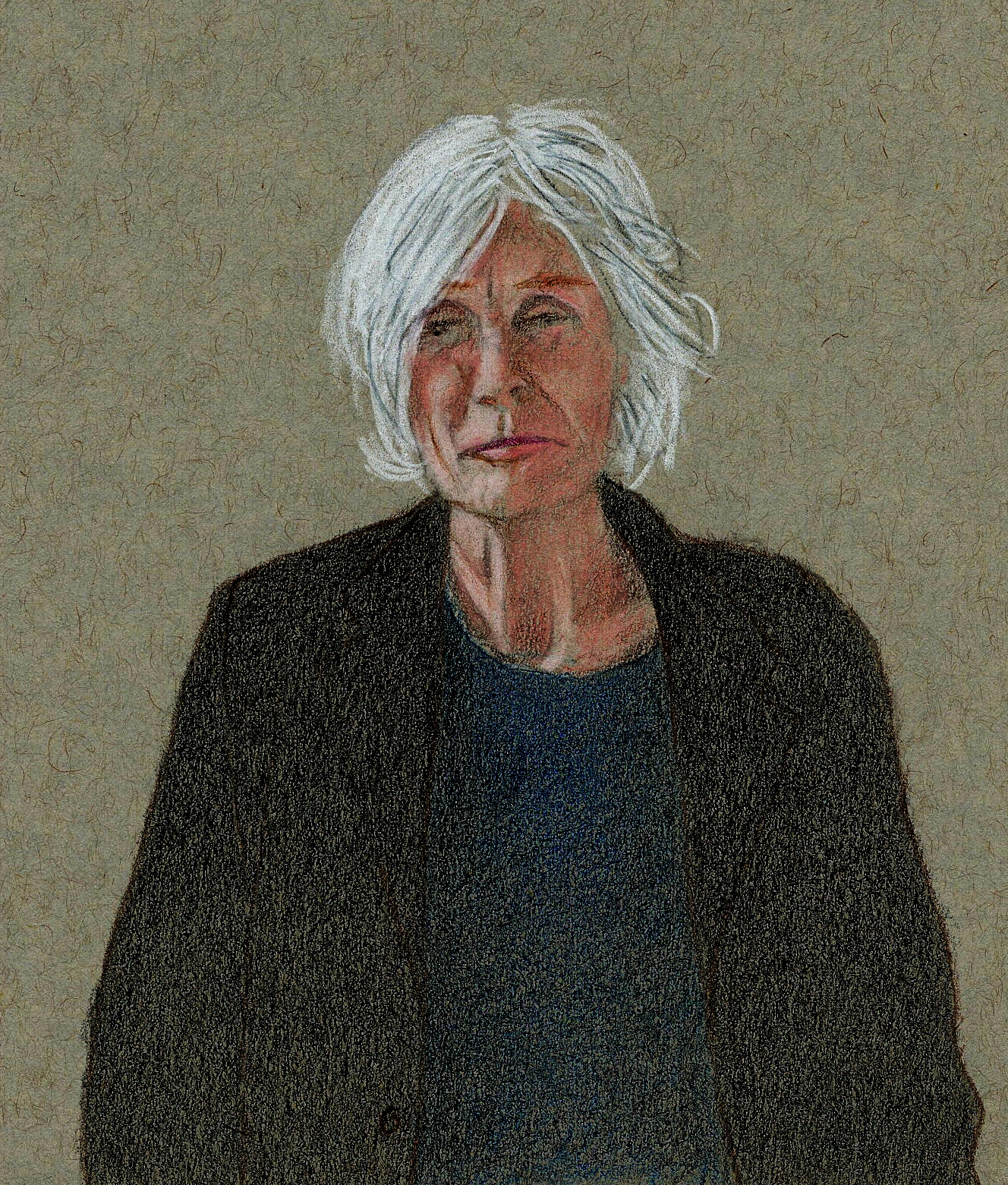
- Portrait sketch of Churchill, 2022
- Born: Caryl Lesley Churchill; 3 September 1938 (age 88); Finsbury, London, England
- Education: Lady Margaret Hall, Oxford
- Occupation: Playwright
- Spouse: David Harter (m. 1961; died 2021)
- Children: 3
- Writing career
- Notable works: Top Girls; Cloud 9; Serious Money; Far Away; A Number; Love and Information

Caryl Lesley Churchill (born 3 September 1938) is a British playwright known for dramatising the abuses of power, for her use of non-naturalistic techniques, and for her exploration of sexual politics and feminist themes. Celebrated for works such as Cloud 9 (1979), Top Girls (1982), Serious Money (1987), Blue Heart (1997), Far Away (2000), A Number (2002), and Love and Information (2012), she has been described as "one of Britain's greatest poets and innovators for the contemporary stage". In a 2011 dramatists' poll by The Village Voice, six out of the 20 polled writers listed Churchill as the greatest living playwright.

== Early life and education ==
Churchill was born on 3 September 1938 in Finsbury, London, the daughter of Jan Brown, a fashion model and actress, and Robert Churchill, a political cartoonist. After the Second World War, her family emigrated to Montreal, Canada; Churchill was ten years old. In Montreal, she attended Trafalgar School for Girls.

She returned to England to attend university in 1956, and in 1960 graduated from Lady Margaret Hall, Oxford, with a BA degree in English Literature. She received the Richard Hillary Memorial Prize at Oxford and also began her writing career there. Her four earliest plays — Downstairs (produced 1958), You've No Need to be Frightened, Having a Wonderful Time (1960), and Easy Death (produced 1962) — were performed at Oxford by student theatre ensembles. Her play Downstairs was performed at the National Student Drama Festival in 1958 and won the first prize.

== Career and artistry ==
While raising a family in the 1960s and 1970s, Churchill began to write short radio dramas for BBC Radio. These included The Ants (1962), Not, Not, Not, Not Enough Oxygen (1971), and Schreber's Nervous Illness (1972). She also wrote television plays for the BBC, including The After-Dinner Joke (1978) and Crimes (1982). These, as well as some of her radio plays, have been adapted for the stage.

In her early work, Churchill explored gender and sexuality through modernist theatre techniques of epic theatre. In the mid-1980s, she started to incorporate dance-theatre in her writing. A Mouthful of Birds (1986) is the first example of this, and references the surrealist theatre tradition of Antonin Artaud and the Theatre of Cruelty. The fragmented and surrealistic narratives in Churchill's work characterise it as postmodernist.

=== Themes and plays ===
In 1972, Churchill wrote Owners, a two-act, 14-scene play about obsession with power. It was her first professionally produced stage play and "her first major theatrical endeavour"; it was produced in London the same year.

She served as resident dramatist at the Royal Court Theatre from 1974 to 1975, and was the Royal Court's first female playwright in residence. She began collaboration with theatre companies such as the Joint Stock Theatre Company and the Monstrous Regiment Theatre Company (a feminist theatre collective). Both used an extended workshop period in their development of new plays. Churchill continues to use an improvisational workshop period in developing a number of her plays. During this period, she also wrote Objections to Sex and Violence (1974).

Her first play to receive wide notice was Cloud Nine (1979), "a farce about sexual politics", set partly in a British overseas colony during the Victorian era. It explores the effects of the colonialist/imperialist mindset on intimate personal relationships, and uses cross-gender casting for comic and instructive effect. The play became successful in Britain and in the United States, winning an Obie Award in 1982 for best play of the year in New York.

Churchill gradually abandoned more conventions of realism, with her loyalty to feminist themes and ideas becoming a guiding principle in her work. She won an Obie Award for best play in 1983 with Top Girls, "which deals with women's losing their humanity in order to attain power in a male-dominated environment." It features an all-female cast, and focuses on Marlene, who has relinquished a home and family to achieve success in the world of business. Half the action takes place at a celebratory dinner where Marlene mixes with historical, iconic and fictional women who have achieved great stature in a "man's world", but always at great cost. The other half of the play, set a year in the past, focuses on Marlene's family, where the true cost of her "successful" life becomes poignantly and frighteningly apparent. In Top Girls, Churchill devised a system to indicate how the dialogue should be performed. She used the forward dash signal (/) to demonstrate a person interrupting the person speaking. She also used the asterisk symbol (*) to indicate a speech following on from a speech earlier than the one immediately before it.

Softcops (first produced by the Royal Shakespeare Company in 1984) is a "surreal play set in 19th-century France about government attempts to depoliticize illegal acts". Justin Hayford of the Chicago Reader wrote that the play had little to offer to those who had already read Michel Foucault's Discipline and Punish (on which Softcops is based), and that the play "glosses Foucault's monumental work in Cliffs Notes fashion". In 2018, Michael Billington stated that Softcops "felt like a meditation on crime and punishment lacking Churchill's usual gift of narrative drive."

The play A Mouthful of Birds (1986) was co-written with David Lan. Wallace Shawn has argued that it is among the "rich, inventive" Churchill works that are responsible for theater remaining exciting in modern times. Cameron Woodhead of The Sydney Morning Herald billed the play as "a difficult pleasure to watch and a challenge to perform". Billington listed A Mouthful of Birds as one of Churchill's misfires, however, and dismissed the play as "mystifying in its attempt to create a dance-drama suggesting that the violence and ecstasy of Euripides' The Bacchae were alive in modern Britain."

Serious Money (1987), "a comedy about excesses in the financial world", is a verse play, chiefly written in rhyming couplets. It takes a satirical look at the vagaries of the stock market and its Thatcherite denizens. The play was highly acclaimed, perhaps in part because it played immediately after the stock market crash of 1987. Icecream (Royal Court Theatre 1989) explores Anglo-American stereotypes. Richard Christensen of the Chicago Tribune wrote that Icecream "doesn't have much depth, but it does have a quirky, creepy kick to it", describing it as "a small but telling piece of theater". Andrew Dickson of The New Yorker dubbed the play "wryly picaresque" in 2015.

Churchill's play The Skriker (1994) includes distorted language, references to English folktales, and evocations of modern urban life. The Skriker is an ancient shape-shifting fairy and death portent in a search for revenge and love. The play initially received lukewarm reviews from critics, but is now considered among Churchill's successes.

"The prolific Churchill continued to push boundaries into the late 1990s. In 1997 she collaborated with the composer Orlando Gough to create 'Hotel,' a choreographed opera or sung ballet set in a hotel room. Also that year her surrealistic short play This Is a Chair was produced." Reviews of the London opening of Hotel were favorable, but with the first piece ("Eight Rooms") generally considered superior to the second ("Two Nights"). In 2015, Moira Buffini of The Guardian listed This Is a Chair as one of Churchill's best works, stating that it "shows a real humility about the political inadequacy of playwrights."

Her 2002 play, A Number, addresses the subject of human cloning and questions of identity. Churchill received an Obie Award in 2005 for this play. Her adapted screenplay of A Number was shown on BBC TV in September 2008.

The play Drunk Enough to Say I Love You? (2006) takes a critical look at what she sees as Britain's submission to the United States in foreign policy.

In 2010, Churchill was commissioned to write the libretto for a new short opera by Orlando Gough, as part of the Royal Opera House's ROH2 OperaShots initiative. The resulting work, A ring a lamp a thing, played for five performances in the Linbury Studio Theatre at the Royal Opera House.

Her play Love and Information opened at the Royal Court Theatre in September 2012, directed by James Macdonald. It was well-received by critics. The play, featuring 100 characters and performed by a cast of 15, is structured as a series of more than 50 fragmented scenes, some no longer than 25 seconds, all of which are apparently unrelated but which accumulate into a startling mosaic, a portrayal of modern consciousness and the need for human intimacy, love and connection. The play had its regional premiere at Sheffield Theatres in June 2018, directed by Caroline Steinbeis.

Ding Dong the Wicked (2013) has been described as a companion piece to Love and Information. Charles Spencer said in The Telegraph that the work is "little more than a clever dramatic exercise" but "nags away in the memory long after you have left the theatre". Matthew Tucker gave the Royal Court Theatre performance three out of five stars, dubbed the play "snappy", and wrote, "Some may find this latest offering terse and obscure, however, in the spirit of explorative theatre, Ding Dong The Wicked is an intriguing and satisfying production." A reviewer for the Evening Standard argued: "What it all means is food for later reflection, but as always Churchill seems inventive, coolly socialist, bleak yet dazzling, a bit of a shaman. Although her technique sounds gimmicky, it works." Conversely, The Guardian's Michael Billington wrote that the work "feels as if it's cramming a trunkload of ideas into a tiny vanity case [...] the tightness of the format means there is no room to explore the source of so much private and public fury, or to differentiate between one society and another. In short, the play is too generalised to make any strong emotional impact."

The Royal Court Theatre premiere of Pigs and Dogs received a positive review in The Stage and moderately positive reviews in The Guardian, The Observer, and Evening Standard, with the last newspaper's Henry Hitchings stating: "While the incantatory style isn't consistently engaging, this is a striking parade of views on a subject that merits more sustained treatment." Andrzej Lukowski of Time Out said in a three-star review that the play "makes its point effectively if tersely". Mark Lawson of The Guardian praised Beautiful Eyes as a "sharp" comedy.

In 2025, four one-act plays (Glass, Kill, What If If Only and Imp) were presented together at the Public Theater in New York City, under the portmanteau title Glass. Kill. What If If Only. Imp.. Directed by James Macdonald, this production marked the first time all four plays were presented together. Glass, Kill, and Imp were first presented by the English Stage Company at the Royal Court Theatre on September 18, 2019. What If If Only was first presented by the English Stage Company at the Royal Court Theatre on September 29, 2021. What If If Only had its North American premiere in 2021 with remote live performances presented by the National Asian American Theatre Company, realized by Les Waters and Jared Mezzocchi.

=== Translations ===
Churchill has published translations of Seneca's Thyestes, Olivier Choinière's Bliss (Félicité), and August Strindberg's A Dream Play. Her version of A Dream Play was premiered at the National Theatre in 2005.

=== Retrospective ===
The Royal Court Theatre held a 70th-birthday retrospective of her work by presenting readings of many of her most famous plays directed by notable playwrights, including Martin Crimp and Mark Ravenhill.

== Personal life ==
In 1961 she married campaigning barrister David Harter (who died in 2021). They had three sons, and, as of 2012, she was known to be living in the same house in Hackney, east London, that she has been living in since the early 1960s.

=== Interest in Palestine ===
Churchill is a patron of the Palestine Solidarity Campaign.

In January 2009, she wrote a ten-minute play that explores a history of Israel, ending with the 2008 Israeli attack on Gaza. It was performed for free at the Royal Court Theatre, with a collection taken to donate to Medical Aid for Palestinians.

The Sunday Times condemned its "ludicrous and utterly predictable lack of even-handedness"; for The Times, "there are no heroes or villains, for all that Churchill decries what is happening in Gaza". Writers such as Jeffrey Goldberg of The Atlantic and Melanie Phillips in her Spectator blog criticised the play as anti-Semitic, as did John Nathan. He noted that Churchill has said that Seven Jewish Children is "not just a theatre event but a political event." He suggested that a play representing views of one community and critical of that community needed to be written by a member of that community. The Royal Court denied the accusation.

Churchill published the play, Seven Jewish Children – a play about Gaza, online, for free download and use. Churchill said: "Anyone can perform it without acquiring the rights, as long as they do a collection for people in Gaza at the end of it".

In April 2022, Churchill was named the recipient of the 2022 European Drama award in recognition of her life's work. The prize was worth £65,000, and was given by German theatre Schauspiel Stuttgart and sponsored by the Baden-Württemberg ministry of science, research and arts. The award was cancelled following criticism of Churchill's support for the Boycott, Divestment and Sanctions movement, a decision condemned by industry figures including Harriet Walter, Stephen Daldry, Peter Kosminsky and Dominic Cooke.

In June 2025, Churchill pulled out of a planned, at the time unannounced, project with the Donmar Warehouse due to the theatre's sponsorship agreement with Barclays, which provided financial services to defence companies supplying Israel during its campaign in Gaza. More than 300 artists signed a subsequent letter supporting her decision.

== Works ==
=== Theatre ===
- Downstairs (1958) – produced but script unpublished
- Having a Wonderful Time (1960) – produced but script unpublished
- Easy Death (1960) – produced but script unpublished
- Schreber's Nervous Illness (1972) – Performed earlier the same year on radio. Based on Memoirs of My Nervous Illness by Daniel Paul Schreber.
- The Hospital at the Time of the Revolution (written 1972)
- Owners (1972)
- Moving Clocks Go Slow (1973) – produced but script unpublished
- Objections to Sex and Violence (1975)
- Traps (1976)
- Vinegar Tom (1976)
- Light Shining in Buckinghamshire (1976)
- Floorshow (1977) – a cabaret, served as a contributor
- Seagulls (written 1978)
- Cloud Nine (1979)
- Three More Sleepless Nights (1980)
- Top Girls (1982)
- Fen (1983)
- Softcops (1983)
- Midday Sun (1984) – created with Geraldine Pilgrim and Pete Brooks
- A Mouthful of Birds (1986) – created with David Lan and Ian Spink
- Serious Money (1987)
- Icecream (1989)
- Hot Fudge (1989)
- Mad Forest (1990)
- Lives of the Great Poisoners (1991) – created with Orlando Gough and Ian Spink
- The Skriker (1994)
- Thyestes (1994) – translation of Seneca's tragedy
- Blue Heart (1997)
- Heart's Desire (1997)
- Hotel (1997)
- This Is a Chair (1999)
- Far Away (2000)
- A Number (2002)
- A Dream Play (2005) – translation of August Strindberg's play of the same name
- Drunk Enough to Say I Love You? (2006)
- Bliss (2008) – translation of the play Félicité by Olivier Choinière
- Seven Jewish Children – a Play for Gaza (2009)
- Love and Information (2012)
- Ding Dong the Wicked (2013)
- War and Peace Gaza Piece (2014)
- Here We Go (2015)
- Tickets Are Now on Sale (2015)
- Escaped Alone (2016)
- Pigs and Dogs (2016)
- Beautiful Eyes (2017)
- Glass (2019)
- Kill (2019)
- Bluebeard's Friends (2019)
- Imp (2019)
- What If If Only (2021)
- Triumph (2026)
- Three and a Bit (2027)

=== Radio dramas ===
- You've No Need to be Frightened (1959)
- The Ants (1962)
- Lovesick (1966)
- Identical Twins (1968)
- Abortive (1971)
- Not Not Not Not Not Enough Oxygen (1971)
- Schreber's Nervous Illness (1972) – based on Memoirs of My Nervous Illness by Daniel Paul Schreber.
- Henry's Past (1972)
- The Judge's Wife (1972)
- Top Girls (1992) - radio version of Churchill's 1982 play of the same name.
- Serious Money (2011) - radio version of Churchill's 1987 play of the same name.
- The Skriker (2016) - radio version of Churchill's 1994 play of the same name.
- Escaped Alone (2018) - radio version of Churchill's 2016 play of the same name.

=== Television ===
- Save It for the Minister (1975) – written with Mary O'Malley and Cherry Potter
- The After-Dinner Joke (1978)
- The Legion Hall Bombing (1979)
- Crimes (1982)
- Fugue (1987) – created with Ian Spink
- Top Girls (1991) – television adaptation of Churchill's 1982 stage play of the same name
- A Number (2008) – television adaptation of Churchill's 2002 stage play of the same name

== Awards and honours ==
Churchill has received the following awards:

- 1958: Sunday Times/National Union of Students Drama Festival Award Downstairs
- 1961: Richard Hillary Memorial Prize
- 1981: Obie Award for Playwriting, Cloud Nine
- 1982: Obie Award for Playwriting, Top Girls
- 1983: Susan Smith Blackburn Prize (runner-up), Top Girls
- 1984: Susan Smith Blackburn Prize, Fen
- 1987: Evening Standard Theatre Award for Best Comedy of the Year, Serious Money
- 1987: Obie Award for Best New Play, Serious Money
- 1987: Susan Smith Blackburn Prize, Serious Money
- 1988: Laurence Olivier Award for Best New Play, Serious Money
- 2001: Obie Sustained Achievement Award
- 2010: Inducted into the American Theater Hall of Fame

In addition, the Caryl Churchill Theatre at Royal Holloway, University of London in Egham was named in honour of Churchill in 2013.

== See also ==
- List of British playwrights since 1950
- Max Stafford-Clark who directed the original productions of Churchill's plays Light Shining in Buckinghamshire, Cloud Nine, Top Girls, Serious Money, Ice Cream and Blue Heart.
- David Lan
- Ian Spink
- Bertolt Brecht and his epic theatre
- Antonin Artaud and his Theatre of Cruelty
- Pina Bausch
- Postmodern theatre
- Dance theatre
- Performance art
- Experimental theatre
- Political drama
- Michel Foucault
- Theatre of the United Kingdom
- English drama
