= Drunk Enough to Say I Love You? =

Play written by Caryl Churchill

Drunk Enough to Say I Love You? is a 2006 political play with eight scenes by Caryl Churchill. It addresses the application of power by the United States mostly since the Vietnam War. Critics' responses to the play are divided.

== Plot summary ==
Two men, Sam ("a country") and Jack/Guy ("a man"), are homosexual lovers. Their interaction is an elliptical, often fragmented political dialogue. Sam is the aggressive one and Jack/Guy initially his enthusiastic follower, who, however, in the process of the play becomes more and more disenchanted. Sam is clearly identified as the American government that touts American hegemony and foreign intervention, and Jack is his lover, who becomes a disillusioned follower by the end.

== Productions ==
The play is brief (45 min) and without an intermission. It was first produced at the Royal Court Theatre in London with the world premiere on 10 November 2006. Sam's counterpart was initially named Jack emphasizing the British nature of the person, while in the 2008 American production he becomes Guy, a possible Mr. Anybody. The American version, therefore, also may be a "mirror" as it addresses the relationship between the government and its supportive voters.

In both productions the two actors sit on a sofa in front of a black background. In the course of the play the sofa becomes more and more levitated, possibly reflecting the notion that the two men are becoming more estranged and losing their footing in reality.

In the English premiere Stephen Dillane played Jack and Ty Burrell was Sam. The American premiere in March 2008 featured Samuel West (Guy) and Scott Cohen (Sam) at The Public Theater in Manhattan. Both productions were directed by James Macdonald.

== Reception ==
Reviews were largely unfavorable. The Guardian's Michael Billington suggested that the two characters reflect the Bush-Blair political relationship and noted that "the sexuality of politics" takes centrestage. He said that Drunk Enough to Say I Love You? is "a short play you almost need to hear twice, or read straight after, to get the full force". Benedict Nightingale of The Times criticised the playwright's perspective as one-sided, but recognised an underlying anxiety and anger. Paul Taylor of The Independent also described the work as "diabolically clever but one-sided", and a "shallow piece of shrill US-baiting" in comparison to Far Away. Taylor argued, "It may be wickedly witty in the elliptical fragmentation of the dialogue and the canniness with which it understands the black comedy of mutual dependence. But in pretending that it has found the essential in Britain's relationship with America and in allowing Blair's relationship with Bush to colour the entire proceedings, it is in fact a travesty version of the Special Relationship, which is historically far more nuanced than you would ever deduce from this."

David Benedict of Variety stated that Drunk Enough to Say I Love You? is "drama at its most austerely pure" and wrote, "Unlike dramatists who treat auds as passive, letting them soak up overly explanatory exposition and information, Churchill withholds." But the critic also stated that "Churchill reveals her hand too early. With auds swiftly attuned to the "real" content – the shared guilt and responsibility for global politics and the dominance of bullying Western power plays – in dramatic terms, the play doesn’t develop. Although ideas of individual scenes change, the thrust grows predictable." In 2008, David Rooney wrote a lukewarm review for the same magazine. The critic praised the play as having "mordant humor that mercilessly nails the oblivious arrogance of American government". But Rooney complained that the characters don't evolve beyond being national mouthpieces, and argued that certain elements suggest eagerness by Churchill "to lay blame at the feet of all Americans while reserving her scorn on the other side of the pond for toadying politicians. [...] when your main character’s unrepentant guilt is established from the outset, the drama becomes less a developing conflict than an articulate, masterfully staged harangue."

Hilton Als of The New Yorker lauded the play as "wildly beautiful and entertaining", but also argued that because Churchill "is a playwright of ideas, she sometimes verges on didacticism, and toward the middle of the play her outrage over America’s conduct in the Middle East begins to eclipse our perception of what’s happening between the two men." Ben Brantley of The New York Times stated that while on paper Drunk Enough to Say I Love You? "reads as a minor work from a major playwright, little more than a political poison-pen letter [...] with Ms. Churchill, one of the most inventive and incisive dramatists of her generation, even rabid venting takes the form of a brave, canny exploration of theatrical language that comes to startling life on the stage."

Jeremy McCarter of New York magazine derided the playwright's attack on the United States as "cartoonish", and found the work minor in comparison to other Churchill plays. The Telegraph's Charles Spencer said in 2012 that the play is "as glib and nasty a piece of anti-American agitprop as I have ever seen." Conversely, Drunk Enough to Say I Love You? was described in Varsity as "a sort of toxic love song, with grating, malicious politics woven into poetics, which through its darkness is often funny, if bitterly so." The review describes Churchill as conjuring "another semi-fantastical, semi-commentative great" with a "deeply captivating" political narrative.
