= The Vespers =

American rock band

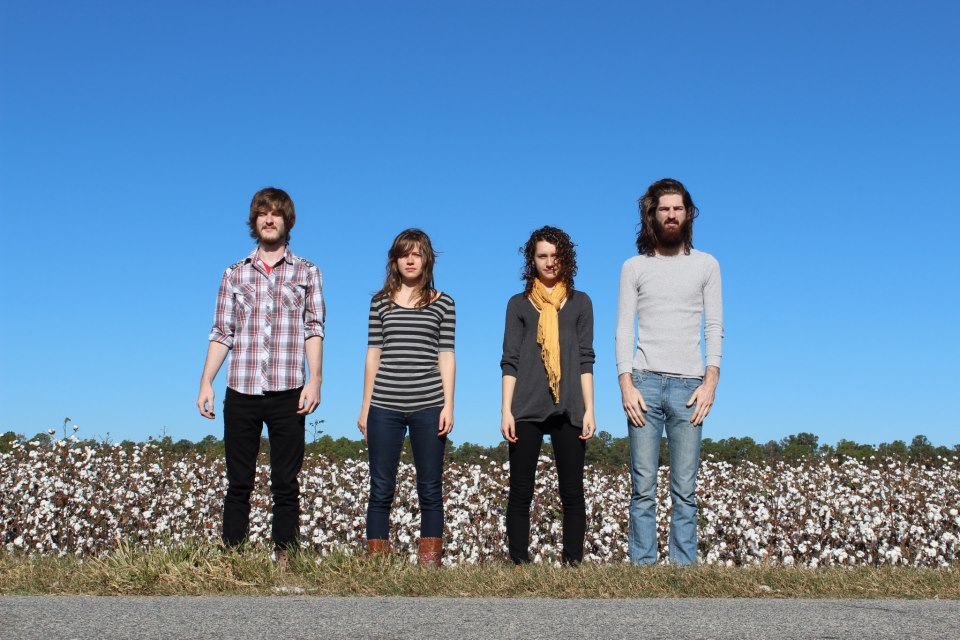
- The Vespers

Background information
- Origin: Nashville, Tennessee, United States
- Genres: Americana, folk, roots
- Years active: 2009–2016
- Label: Black Suit
- Members: Callie Cryar; Phoebe Cryar; Bruno Jones; Taylor Jones

The Vespers are an Americana band from Nashville, Tennessee. The band is made up of two brothers, Taylor and Bruno Jones, and two sisters, Callie and Phoebe Cryar. Bruno plays upright bass, guitar, a little banjo, ukulele, and mandolin. Taylor Jones plays drums, percussion, vocals, and mandolin. Callie plays guitar, ukulele, banjo, electric bass, lead vocals, and low harmony. Phoebe plays guitar, banjo, accordion, mandolin, ukulele, lead vocals and low harmony.

== History ==
A vesper is an evening prayer. Phoebe encountered the distinctive word while reading and Callie believed it to be easy to remember.

All four members were born and raised in Nashville. Callie and Phoebe, daughters of Christian artist Morgan Cryar, sang background vocals on Music Row from a young age. Taylor and Bruno had grown up influenced heavily by their father's music collection, which included everything from gritty southern rock to soul. The two sets of siblings met each other at a mutual friend's campfire. In May 2009, the four came together and played for the first time, originally just playing songs that the Cryar sisters had written. "Things progressed in a way that none of us really could have predicted," says Callie. "We knew that it was an intriguing sound, and we liked what was happening," adds Bruno. By the following winter, they made their first record, Tell Your Mama, and released it in March 2010. The record was received with critical acclaim. It is "a blend of bluegrass, folk, & alternative music all held together tightly by Callie & Phoebe’s angelic harmonies & Taylor & Bruno’s hypnotic rhythms."

They spent the next two years on tour, performing "anywhere people would let [them]". In the beginning of 2011, they began to think about their next record, writing most of their songs while on the road. They recorded the new music in two pieces, during breaks from touring in May and August 2011, with the help of producers Anderson East and Daniel Scobey. This second record, The Fourth Wall was released on April 3, 2012. The band stated that the 'fourth wall' refers to the invisible wall between the performers and the audience, and their goal is to break down that wall with each show.

Sisters and Brothers, the band's third album, was released by Black Suit Records on February 10, 2015.

== Members ==
- Callie Cryar – ukulele, banjo, acoustic guitar, electric bass, vocals
- Phoebe Cryar – banjo, acoustic guitar, ukulele, mandolin, vocals
- Bruno Jones – upright bass, acoustic guitar, banjo, dobro, mandolin, ukulele, vocals
- Taylor Jones – drums, percussion, mandolin, vocals

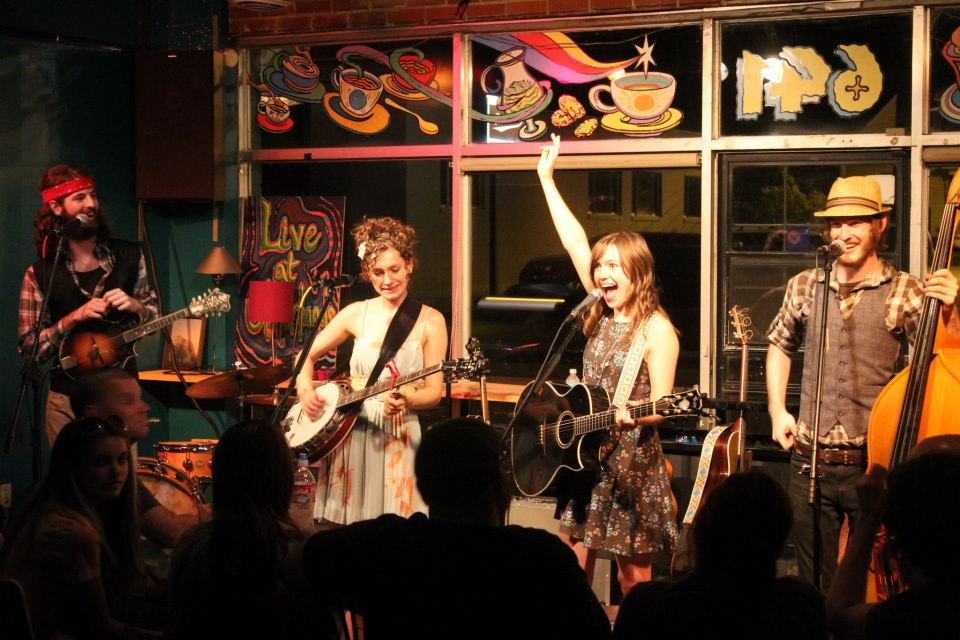
The Vespers at The Otherlands

== Media ==
- The Vespers have been profiled by The Huffington Post.
- The Vespers appeared on episode 209H of the nationally syndicated Public Television show "Bluegrass Underground".
- They were also named Top "12 of 2012's ShowToppers Concerts of the Year", by The Huffington Post for their concert in Denver's venue, The Soiled Dove.
- The Vespers have been reviewed by The Christian Post for their performance at the "New Artist Showcase" of the International Christian Retail Show held in St. Louis, Mo. June 26, 2013.
- The Vespers album, The Fourth Wall, has been reviewed by publications such as, No Depression, The Huffington Post, Sputnik Music, Indie Vision Music, Country Standard Time, Louder Than Music, and Free Christian Music Blog.
- The Vespers first album, Tell Your Mama, was reviewed by Cross Rhythms.
- "Lawdy", from the album The Fourth Wall, was used in episode 33, the season finale, of the A&E drama Longmire which first aired on August 4, 2014.
- "Better Now" was used in episode 14 of season 2 of the TV series, Elementary.

== Discography ==
- Tell Your Mama (2010)
- The Fourth Wall (2012)
- Sisters and Brothers (2014)
