= Blue Heart (play) =

Two one-act plays (1997) by Caryl Churchill

- Written by: Caryl Churchill

Premiere
- Date premiered: 1997

Blue Heart is a series of two one-act plays, written by Caryl Churchill and copyrighted in 1997. The first play, Heart’s Desire, is about a family waiting on the arrival of their daughter Suzy. The second play, Blue Kettle, is about a man named Derek who goes around telling women that they are his mother, claiming he was adopted at birth; the women believe him and find ways to confirm that he is indeed their son. As the interactions between Derek and the women move forward, the words "blue" and "kettle" are inserted into the dialogue with increasing frequency, seemingly at random. Blue Heart is highly regarded by critics.

== Productions ==
The plays were developed for the 1997 Edinburgh Festival Fringe in collaboration with the small British touring company Out of Joint. The production, directed by Max Stafford-Clark, then moved to London's Royal Court Theatre, and was followed by an international tour. In 1999, the Out of Joint production was presented at Brooklyn Academy of Music (BAM).

Studio Theatre (Washington, D.C.) presented the plays in a November/December 1999 production.

Cesear's Forum, Cleveland's minimalist theatre company, presented the plays at Kennedy's Theatre, Playhouse Square in 2003.

Tobacco Factory Theatres and the Orange Tree Theatre presented the plays in 2016.

== Plot ==
The first play in the piece, Heart's Desire, is about a family waiting for their daughter's return from Australia. Her father, mother and aunt play through the same scene, time and time again, a few seconds at a time, with variations. Some variants appear to be wish-fulfillment on the part of one character or another; some seem to represent a collective attempt to settle on a mutually acceptable compromise account; some include random intrusions from, for instance, a group of armed paramilitaries or an angry emu. With a more or less definitive version of the daughter's arrival, the play ends in mid-sentence.

In the second play, Blue Kettle, a man named Derek tells several women they are his mother, claiming he was adopted at birth. The women believe him and find ways of "confirming" his story, while Derek keeps them slightly uneasy and ultimately, he hopes, prepared to buy him into their lives with gifts of money – this fraud is his aim. At first occasionally, then with increasing frequency, words are replaced seemingly at random with "blue" or "kettle". The audience finds itself at first interpreting the missing words through the verbal context, then increasingly interpreting the dialogue as a whole in the context of body language, mood and already acquired information.

== Reception ==
In The New York Times, Ben Brantley lauded Heart's Desire (the first play) as "achingly, aggressively funny" and the ending of Blue Kettle (the second play) as "heartbreaking". Matt Wolf of Variety wrote that "both plays speak volubly and wisely about language and emotions in disarray". Wolf stated that the finale of Blue Kettle is "comparable in affect to the closing lines of the playwright’s 'Top Girls'". Moira Buffini of The Guardian listed Blue Heart as one of her favorite Churchill works, saying of Blue Kettle that "[the characters'] anguish is felt more fully in this desperate inarticulacy." Buffini referred to the two plays as "deeply affecting – not just because they are powerful drama, but because of what they say about the struggle to write. It’s as if the play will be, no matter what the playwright tries to do to it."

Sally Hales of Exeunt argued, "There’s no doubt Blue Heart is a challenge but, unlike other self-consciously intellectual literary efforts, warmth and humanity pervades Churchill’s work, no matter how weird things get." In praising the first play, Heart's Desire, Hales wrote: "The family labours under the impossibility of creating the scene of the perfect homecoming. Any of the alternative scenarios, each packed with drama and tension, could be the foundation of a great play. Churchill’s genius is that she rejects control and chooses all of them instead. The overarching impression is that there is no right way, no whole, no finished product for family life or for art." Hales also referred to Blue Kettle as "no less compelling". In Evening Standard, Henry Hitchings described the writing as having an "unusual mix of droll realism and loopy inventiveness".

Michael Billington of The Guardian gave a 2016 Orange Tree Theatre performance of Blue Heart four out of five stars and described the work as "brilliant". The critic billed Heart's Desire as "both one of the funniest short plays ever written and a reminder of the savagery that often lies beneath the surface of family life." Paul Taylor of The Independent gave the performance the same rating and praised the experimental twist of Blue Kettle as "brilliant", writing that "Churchill makes the situation all the more haunting and queasily comic by showing how language breaks down under the emotional strain creating the weird verbal tic described above. Grief and confusion may become unutterable but communication somehow survives." Lynne Walsh of Morning Star wrote, "To play with a simple storyline, creating the surreal one minute, the opposite the next, a writer has to have a sure touch and know how to harness the anarchic elements and Churchill certainly has those qualities."
