= A Mouthful of Birds =

Play written by Caryl Churchill and David Lan

- Written by: Caryl Churchill and David Lan
- Subject: Possession, madness, and female violence
- Genre: Play with dance

Premiere
- Date: 1986
- Place: United Kingdom

A Mouthful of Birds is a 1986 play with dance, written by Caryl Churchill and David Lan, with choreography by Ian Spink. Drawing its themes from The Bacchae of Euripides, it is a meditation on possession, madness and female violence.

== Synopsis ==
The play has an unusual structure; it is a series of seven independent vignettes each focusing on a different character. After every scene, a moment in the tragedy of Pentheus is seen. Dionysos, a dancer, watches the action invisibly, and his kiss causes each episode's central transformation. At the play's end, the characters return to give epilogues narrating how their stories continued.

The episodes include:

- An unhappy wife slowly succumbs to post-natal psychosis. She experiences command hallucinations telling her to drown her baby in the bathtub, and eventually does so.
- A man's marriage and career are disrupted when he falls passionately in love with a pig at a slaughterhouse his company owns.
- A voodoo practitioner newly arrived in London is haunted by an upper-crust British spirit who tries to drive away her familiar Haitian spirit guide, Baron Sunday.
- Herculine Barbin, a nineteenth-century hermaphrodite, narrates the story of his transformation from girl to man. This monologue lies at the center of the play and is performed first by an actress, then repeated in identical language by a male actor.
- An acupuncturist struggles to overcome her alcoholism.
- Two jailers must restore order in their prison when a vicar-turned-serial-killer among the inmates inexplicably changes sex and begins killing other prisoners with magic.
- A female office worker is subject to grotesque, bloody fantasies and fits of rage.

The actors play ensemble roles in all scenes other than their own. Dance sequences are at the center of the episodes involving the pig and his lover, the schizophrenic and her hallucinated tormentor, and the serial killer.

The play's perspective on mental illness and sexuality is strongly influenced by the work of Michel Foucault, who also wrote a monograph on the life of Herculine Barbin, as well as by David Lan's own anthropological work on possession and non-Western religions.
