= A Number =

2002 play written by Caryl Churchill

- Written by: Caryl Churchill
- Characters: Salter; Bernard 1 Bernard 2 Michael Black
- Original language: English
- Subject: Human cloning and identity

Premiere
- Date premiered: 23 September 2002
- Place premiered: Royal Court Theatre, London, England

A Number is a 2002 play by British playwright Caryl Churchill. The story, set in the near future, is structured around the conflict between a father (Salter) and his sons (Bernard 1, Bernard 2, and Michael Black) – two of whom are clones of the first one. The play addresses the subject of human cloning and identity, especially nature versus nurture. Many critics over the years have lauded A Number, arguing Churchill created a work of significant intellectual depth with effective economy of style.

== Plot synopsis ==
Scene 1: Bernard 2 ("B2" in the script) has discovered that he is one of a number of clones. Salter explains that he agreed to a cloning experiment to try again at parenting his first son, who had died, but, unbeknownst to Salter, the doctors unethically made several more clones. Salter decides that they should sue the doctors, which soothes the shaken Bernard 2.

Scene 2: An angry Bernard 1 ("B1") visits Salter for the first time since his childhood. We learn that Salter sent him to a clinical home after the suicide of his mother had left them both in a constant state of fear and pain. B1 has learned about the clones, and is furious at his father for doing it, as well as for his neglectful and traumatic upbringing. Salter admits that the clones were meant to give him another chance at raising a child without repeating his many parental mistakes. B1 grows increasingly agitated and threatens to murder B2.

Scene 3: B2 speaks to Salter after having met B1 in the park. He has learned the truth about the situation, and now hates Salter for what he has done. B2 decides to leave the country for a while, both to get away from Salter and because he fears that B1 might try to kill him. Salter tries to convince him not to go, or at least to come back soon, but B2 refuses.

Scene 4: B1 tells Salter that when B2 left the country, B1 followed him and killed him. Salter, stricken with grief, demands to know the details, but B1 says little.

Scene 5: Salter is meeting with one of the other clones of his son, Michael Black. We learn that Bernard 1 has killed himself, and Salter is now planning to meet with the other clones. Michael, who never knew Salter, is a happily married maths teacher with three children. He is completely undisturbed that he is a clone, and tells Salter that he does not care. Salter finds this very unsettling. He demands to know more about him, something personal and unique, but Michael can only answer superficially and Salter is left unsatisfied.

== Characters ==
- Salter: a man in his early sixties. He was married and had one son, named Bernard. His wife committed suicide by throwing herself under a train when their son was only two. Salter attempted to raise their son alone, but was neglectful due to his drinking and the son's issues, and eventually sent his son away. He then had his son cloned, creating Bernard 2, in an attempt to try raising him again and being a better father. He has attempted to hide the truth of what he's done from his sons, and the story is driven by the facts coming to light.
- Bernard (B2): Salter's son, thirty-five, cloned from Bernard 1 to replace him. He is very mild-mannered and emotional.
- Bernard (B1): Salter's son, forty. First and original son of Salter. He was a difficult and disturbed child who was neglected by Salter and then sent away when he was 4. He grew to have an explosive temper and to hate Salter for what he did.
- Michael Black: Salter's son, thirty-five. An unauthorized clone of Salter’s first son. He is married with three children, the oldest aged twelve, and is a mathematics teacher.

== Staging ==
Churchill gives no stage directions and no indication of a setting for the play. In the 2002 production, the stage was described by one critic as a “bare blank design” with “no relation to domestic realism.” The costumes of the play were as simple as the stage design. Salter always wore a rumpled looking suit, sometimes expensive looking, but sometimes not. The various Bernards usually wore jeans and a T-shirt, but sometimes a sweatshirt.

== Productions ==
A Number was first produced in 2002 at the Royal Court Theatre, London.

The play was written during a time of public debate over the ethics of cloning. The cloning of Dolly the sheep, the creation of human embryos at Advanced Cell Technology, and the cloning of a kitten gave rise to controversy concerning possible human cloning.

=== Original production ===
The play debuted at the Royal Court Theatre in London on 23 September 2002. The production was directed by Stephen Daldry and designed by Ian MacNeil and featured the following cast:

- Salter – Michael Gambon
- Bernard 1, Bernard 2, and Michael Black – Daniel Craig

Lighting was designed by Rick Fisher and Ian Dickinson was the sound designer. The play won the 2002 Evening Standard Award for Best Play.

=== Revivals ===
The play was revived at the Sheffield Crucible studio in October 2006 starring real-life father and son Timothy West and Samuel West. This production later played at the Chocolate Factory in 2010 and at the Fugard Theatre, Cape Town in 2011.

The play was revived at The Nuffield Theatre (Southampton) in February 2014 with John and Lex Shrapnel to huge critical acclaim. It transferred to the Young Vic Theatre in June 2015. Zinnie Harris directed the play at the Royal Lyceum Theatre in Edinburgh in April 2017.

The play was revived again at the Bridge Theatre, in February 2020, with Roger Allam and Colin Morgan, directed by Polly Findlay.

The play received a London revival in January 2022 at The Old Vic, with Lennie James and Paapa Essiedu, directed by Lyndsey Turner. The production received a Laurence Olivier Award nomination for Best Revival in the same year.

=== US premiere ===
In 2004, the play made its American debut at the New York Theatre Workshop in a production starring Sam Shepard (later played by Arliss Howard) and Dallas Roberts.

=== LA/OC, California premiere ===
In February/March 2009, the play made its Los Angeles/Orange County debut at the Rude Guerrilla Theater Company in a production directed by Scott Barber, starring Vince Campbell and Mark Coyan.

== Reception ==
Ben Brantley of The New York Times described A Number as "stunning" and "a gripping dramatic consideration of what happens to autonomous identity in a world where people can be cloned". James M. Brandon had mixed sentiments in Theatre Journal, arguing that while it "is a wellwritten play—evocative, disturbing, and with more than one surprise—it remains a troubled one that seems, in production, unfinished. " The critic disputed comparisons of the broken dialogue to that of David Mamet and said that "the language here is not nearly as compelling on the stage". However, Brandon praised the final scene as "brilliant" and said that one of its characters "serves as a welcome reminder that it is possible to have an ostensibly normal life", ultimately describing A Number as "one of the more intellectually vital scripts to emerge in the new century" despite shortcomings.

In a 2006 review of a later Churchill work, The Independent's Paul Taylor described the play as one of the best dramas of the new millennium, and as "superbly compressed and economic". After watching a performance featuring John and Lex Shrapnel, Lyn Gardner of The Guardian dubbed the play "[p]unchy, compact and endlessly inquisitive," arguing that it "is no simple warning against the perils of science messing with nature, but a complex and humane study of parental guilt, regret and responsibility and what it really means to be a father or son." Conversely, Jane Shillings of The Telegraph argued, "The highly wrought writing veers at times towards the mannered, leaving a faint sense that the style of Churchill’s play exceeds its substance, and the issue of cloning has lost its urgency". Don Aucoin of The Boston Globe praised the way the playwright "devotes no time to preamble or writerly throat-clearing, but plunges us straightaway into the play’s central dilemma". In the Chicago Tribune, Chris Jones described A Number as "masterfully written".

After seeing a 2020 Bridge Theatre performance, Nick Curtis of Evening Standard argued: "If the background logistics are sketchy – who made the human copies, and why? – the relationships between Salter and his offspring, and their differing reactions to finding that they are not unique, are right on the money. [...] It’s almost exactly an hour long and the ending is abrupt, but Churchill packs more ideas and feeling into that time than most dramatists manage at twice the length." Clive Davis of The Times, however, panned the play as "both too short and too long" after seeing the same performance. Matt Wolf lauded A Number as a "beautiful play", and wrote that it "works not least as a thriller or bit of forensic detection, as Churchill plants clues prompting a reevaluation of the narrative at every turn." Arjun Neil Alim of The Independent stated that "Churchill, a political playwright par excellence, tactfully references current events. [...] Are 'Who are you?' and 'What are you made from?' the same question? Churchill’s answer comes in the form of a character who defines himself by his deeds and his loved ones, rather than the circumstances of his birth." Andrzej Lukowski of Time Out called the play a "masterpiece".

Steve Dinneen argued in City A.M. that the work "is remarkable in the way it so gracefully touches upon the great philosophical questions without ever feeling didactic. A Number is no cold thought experiment, but a quiet rumination on human nature". Dineen wrote that Salter's interludes "say as much as an hour’s worth of dialogue". Franco Milazzo of Londonist summarised the play as asking "what makes you you?" Arifa Akbar of The Guardian said that "Churchill’s linguistic tics – of interruptions and half-finished sentences – create a hyperreal effect and enable Salter’s obfuscation". Richard Pahl of Northwest Herald billed A Number as an "engaging meditation on human cloning, personal identity and the conflicting claims of nature and nurture". Pahl wrote that the work "offers intellectual and emotional depth, and illustrates the ways people rationalize bad behavior and unthinkingly objectify others, including their own flesh and blood. It asks important questions."

== Interpretation ==
Dinneen argued that the play is about "our desire to be unique, for our lives to have meaning, for our imperfect minds and bodies to somehow achieve perfect ends." Pahl wrote that questions asked by the play are, "If we had a do-over, could we atone for our mistakes? What is the value of a human life? What is the source of our individuality?"

== Adaptations ==
A Number was adapted by Caryl Churchill for television, in a co-production between the BBC and HBO Films. Starring Rhys Ifans and Tom Wilkinson, it was broadcast on BBC Two on 10 September 2008.
