= There I Go Again =

Studio album by David Meece
- Released: 2002
- Genre: Contemporary Christian
- Label: Aluminum Records
- Producer: Brian Hardin

David Meece chronology
Odyssey (1995)	There I Go Again (2002)	David Meece: The Definitive Collection (2007)

There I Go Again is David Meece's thirteenth album. It was produced with Brian Hardin from Aluminum Records.

== Track listing ==
Music by David Meece; Lyrics by David Meece and Dwight Liles. Except "We Are The Reason" written by David Meece.

1. "No Other Hope" – 5:31
2. "Dancing With The Enemy" – 4:22
3. "I Just Want To Be With You" – 3:45
4. "I'll Be Waiting For You" – 5:02
5. "Run" – 3:49
6. "Things You Never Gave Me" – 4:43
7. "Raise These Arms" – 3:39
8. "There I Go Again" – 4:43
9. "Help Me Stand" – 4:48
10. "By The Waters" – 4:36
11. "We Are The Reason" (Live) (CD only bonus track) – 4:42

== Musicians ==
- David Meece – lead vocals, backing vocals, acoustic piano, keyboards, programming, arrangements
- Brian Hardin – programming, arrangements
- Scott V. Smith – programming, arrangements
- David Cleveland – guitars
- James Harrah – guitars
- Jimmy Johnson – bass
- John Robinson – drums
- Chris Meece – drums
- Kelly Meece – backing vocals

== Production ==
- Brian Hardin – executive producer, producer, recording, mixing, mastering, art direction, design, layout (www.brianhardin.com)
- David Meece – pre-production
- Scott V. Smith – pre-production
- Robert Zuckerman – artist photography
- Recorded at The Box and Wildwood Recording (Nashville, TN); SVS Productions (Pasadena, CA).
