= Morgan Cryar =

Morgan Cryar is a contemporary Christian music vocalist, songwriter, and producer from Louisiana. He is especially noted for his creative lyric-writing.

== Music career ==
Cryar's debut, Keep No Secrets, was released in 1984, and its singles "Holy Fire" and "Carried Away" received moderate airplay on Christian radio; but it was his 1986 album, Fuel on the Fire, featuring the chart-topping contemporary Christian single (also nominated for a Dove Award for best video), "Pray in the U.S.A.", that began his road to success. Collaborating with producer Roy Salmond and composers Ty Tabor and Doug Pinnick (later of King's X fame) and well-regarded CCM session player, John Andrew Schreiner, Fuel on the Fire contains some "foot-tapping ditties" and "tuneful ballads" that make up Mr. Cryar's vocal performance. In the 1980s, Cryar toured with big names in the CCM industry, such as Petra and DeGarmo and Key, promoting Fuel on the Fire and his 1989 follow up Like A River to receptive high school and college-age audiences.

Cryar's level of recognition early on in his career paved the way for his fourth album, Kingdom Upside Down (1990), to reach No. 27 on the Billboard Christian charts, despite its criticism as a "pleasantly forgettable album", and for its single, "Father", to hit number one on the Christian radio charts. Additionally in the 1990s, he had a No. 1 Christian radio hit with "If I Never See a Miracle" from 1995's Love Over Gold, and the single, "What Sin?" from the same album had its own moderate success on Christian radio. The album also contained a cover of Tom Petty's I Won't Back Down.

Years after its first release, his song, "See You On the Other Side", gained a special meaning when it was included in a multi-media presentation following the Oklahoma City bombing of 1995 and subsequently played on mainstream radio stations across the nation; however, that wasn't Cryar's only song to have a second life. In 1998, the hit, "Pray in the U.S.A." was also resurrected from Cryar's back-catalog with a new recording and video shot in honor of the National Day of Prayer. The reprise features an all-star chorus, including CCM industry "well-knowns": John Schlitt, Bob Hartman, LuLu Roman, members from the Winans family, Rick Cua, Kenny Marks, Lisa Bevill, Randy Thomas and Andy Denton.

In the 2000s, Cryar used his experience on stage to energize a career behind the scenes as a record producer, mostly for independent artists, using his own label, Premier Records. He also was part of Christian Music Workshops, teaching songwriting, music business, and stage presence. As of 2007, Cryar was CEO of Singing Success, Inc. and resided in Nashville, Tennessee with his wife and their seven children.

From 2005 - 2007, Cryar was CEO of Brett Manning's Singing Success, Inc. He currently resides in Nashville, TN with his wife and their seven children. Two of his children, daughters Callie and Phoebe, are also musicians. They play instruments and sing in the band The Vespers.
