= Susannah Clapp =

British writer

Susannah Clapp (born 1949) is a British writer, who has been the theatre critic of The Observer since 1997 and is a contributor to the BBC Radio 3 Nightwaves programme.

Clapp read English at the University of Bristol, where one of her teachers was Christopher Ricks.

An editor and reader at the publisher Jonathan Cape early in her career, Clapp was a founder of the London Review of Books, where she was assistant editor. She is the author of books about Bruce Chatwin and Angela Carter, and is the literary executor of the estates of both authors.

She was elected a Fellow of the Royal Society of Literature in 2013.

In December 2013, after 14 years' involvement, Clapp resigned from the judging panel of the Evening Standard Theatre Awards following her objection to changes in the voting method. Allegedly, vote rigging occurred caused by the use of a secret ballot, rather than the judges making their case to each other as had been the previous practice.
