= Cloud 9 (play) =

1979 play by Caryl Churchill

- Revised American edition, Methuen, 1984.
- Original language: English
- Written by: Caryl Churchill
- Subject: Colonialism, gender
- Setting: Act I: A British colony in Victorian Africa; Act II: London in 1979

Premiere
- Date: 14 February 1979
- Place: Dartington College of Arts, Totnes

Cloud Nine (sometimes stylized as Cloud 9) is a 1979 British two-act play written by British playwright Caryl Churchill. It was workshopped with the Joint Stock Theatre Company in late 1978 and premiered at Dartington College of Arts, Devon, on 14 February 1979.

The two acts of the play form a contrapuntal structure. Act I is set in British colonial Africa in the Victorian era, and Act II is set in a London park in 1979. However, between the acts only twenty-five years pass for the characters. Each actor plays one role in Act I and a different role in Act II – the characters who appear in both acts are played by different actors in the first and second. Act I parodies the conventional comedy genre and satirizes Victorian society and colonialism. Act II shows what could happen when the restrictions of both the comic genre and Victorian ideology are loosened.

The play uses controversial portrayals of sexuality and obscene language, and establishes a parallel between colonial and sexual oppression. Its humour depends on incongruity and the carnivalesque, and helps to convey Churchill's political message about accepting people who are different and not dominating them or forcing them into particular social roles.

Cloud Nine is one of Churchill's most renowned works. The play was featured in the Royal National Theatre's NT2000 poll of the 100 most significant plays of the 20th century and was also selected for Time Out New York's list of the "best plays of all time". The New York production opened at Lucille Lortel's Theatre de Lys on 18 May 1981 and finished on 4 September 1983, and was directed by Tommy Tune with an original incidental music score by Maury Yeston.

== Characters ==
=== Royal Court Production ===
Act 1

- Clive, a colonial administrator
- Betty, his wife, played by a man
- Joshua, his black servant, played by a white actor
- Edward, his son, played by a woman
- Victoria, his daughter, a ventriloquist's dummy
- Maud, his mother-in-law
- Ellen, Edward's governess
- Harry Bagley, an explorer
- Mrs. Saunders, a widow (played by the same actress who plays Ellen)

Act 2

- Betty, now played by a woman (normally the same actress who plays Edward)
- Edward, her son, now played by a man (normally the same actor who plays Betty)
- Victoria, her daughter (normally played by the same actress who plays Maud)
- Martin, Victoria's husband (normally played by the same actor who plays Harry)
- Lin, a lesbian single mother (normally played by the same actress who plays Ellen/Mrs. Saunders)
- Cathy, Lin's daughter, age 5, played by a man (normally the same actor who plays Clive)
- Gerry, Edward's lover (normally played by the same actor who plays Joshua)

=== Royal Court & New York Productions ===
Act 1

- Clive, a colonial administrator
- Betty, his wife, played by a man
- Joshua, his black servant, played by a white actor
- Edward, his son, played by a woman
- Victoria, his daughter, a ventriloquist's dummy
- Maud, his mother-in-law
- Ellen, Edward's governess
- Harry Bagley, an explorer
- Mrs. Saunders, a widow (played by the same actress who plays Ellen)

Act 2

- Betty, now played by a woman (normally the same actress who plays Ellen/Mrs. Saunders)
- Edward, her son, now played by a man (normally the same actor who plays Clive)
- Victoria, her daughter (normally played by the same actress who plays Edward)
- Martin, Victoria's husband (normally played by the same actor who plays Harry)
- Lin, a lesbian single mother (normally played by the same actress who plays Maud)
- Cathy, Lin's daughter, age 5, played by a man (normally the same actor who plays Joshua)
- Gerry, Edward's lover (normally played by the same actor who plays Betty)

== Synopsis ==
Act I

Clive, a British colonial administrator, lives with his family, a governess and servant during turbulent times in Africa. The natives are rioting, and Mrs Saunders, a widow, comes to them to seek safety. Her arrival is soon followed by Harry Bagley, an explorer. Clive makes passionate advances to Mrs Saunders, his wife Betty fancies Harry, who secretly has sex with Joshua, and later with Clive's son, Edward. The governess Ellen, who reveals herself to be a lesbian, is forced into marriage with Harry after his sexuality is discovered and condemned by Clive. Act 1 ends with the wedding celebrations; the final scene of the first act ends with Clive giving a speech while Joshua, watched by Edward (who does nothing), aims his rifle at him and fires as the scene ends with a blackout.

Act II

Although Act II is set in 1979, some of the characters of Act I reappear – for them, only 25 years have passed. Betty has left Clive, her daughter Victoria is now married to an overbearing Martin, and Edward has an openly gay relationship with Gerry. Victoria, upset and distant from Martin, starts a lesbian relationship with Lin. When Gerry leaves Edward, Edward, who discovers he is in fact bisexual, moves in with his sister and Lin. The three of them have a drunken ceremony in which they call up the Goddess, after which characters from Act I begin appearing. Act II has a looser structure, and Churchill played around with the ordering of the scenes. The final scene shows that Victoria has left Martin for a polyamorous relationship with Edward and Lin, and they are sharing custody of their son Tommy. Gerry and Edward are on good terms again, and Betty becomes friends with Gerry, who tells her about Edward's sexuality.

== Interpretations and observations ==
Act I

Act I of Cloud 9 invites the audience to engage with Britain's colonial past, but does so by challenging "the preconceived notions held by the audience in terms of gender and sexuality". Churchill also subverts gender and racial stereotypes, using cross-gender and cross-racial casting: Betty is played by a man in Act I, but by a woman in Act II; Joshua is played by a white man; and Edward is played by a woman in Act I and by a man in Act II. Churchill deliberately uses this cross-gender, -racial and -age casting to unsettle the audience's expectations. In the introduction to the play, Churchill explains why Betty is played by a man in the first act: "She wants to be what men want her to be ... Betty does not value herself as a woman." Michael Patterson confirms this, writing that "Betty is played by a man in order to show how femininity is an artificial and imposed construct". James Harding suggests that by cross-casting Betty and Edward in Act I, Churchill is also playing it safe: It makes same-sex relationships visibly heterosexual and normative.

The black servant, Joshua, is played by a white man for similar reasons. He says, "My skin is black, but oh my soul is white. I hate my tribe. My master is my light"; Amelia Howe Kritzer argues that "the reversal exposes the rupture in Joshua's identity caused by his internalization of colonial values". Joshua does not identify with his "own" people; in act I, scene 3, Mrs. Saunders asks if he doesn't mind beating his own people and Joshua replies that they are not his people, and they are "bad".

Act II

The second act is set in London 1979, but for the characters only twenty-five years have passed. Churchill explains her reason for this in the introduction: "The first act, like the society it shows, is male-dominated and firmly structured. In the second act, more energy comes from the women and the gays." In Act II, a link is drawn between the 19th-century colonisation of Africa and the 20th-century Northern Ireland conflict. Michael Patterson writes that "the actors ... established a 'parallel between colonial and sexual oppression,' showing how the British occupation of Africa in the nineteenth century and its post-colonial presence in Northern Ireland relate to the patriarchal values of society." Churchill shows the audience different views of oppression, both colonial and sexual. She amplifies social constructs by linking the two periods, using an unnatural time gap. Amelia Howe Kritzer argues that "Churchill remained close to the Brechtian spirit of encouraging the audience to actively criticize institutions and ideologies they have previously taken for granted".

There is a great deal of difference between the two acts: Act II contains much more sexual freedom for women, whereas in Act I the men dictate the relationships. Act II "focuses on changes in the structure of power and authority, as they affect sex and relationships", from the male-dominated structure in the first act. Churchill writes that she "explored Genet's idea that colonial oppression and sexual oppression are similar." She essentially uses the play as a social arena to explore "the Victorian origins of contemporary gender definitions and sexual attitudes, recent changes ... and some implications of these changes."
