= The Ragged Trousered Philanthropists (play) =

The Ragged Trousered Philanthropists is a play by Stephen Lowe, adapted from the classic working-class novel, by Robert Tressell.

It was first produced by Joint Stock in Plymouth on 14 September 1978, directed by William Gaskill. The production then toured the country, with performances in London at Riverside Studios in October.

As with other Joint Stock shows, the project began with a workshop in which Lowe, Gaskill and the actors explored ideas and material for the play. Lowe then worked alone for two months writing the script; finally, the company came together again for a conventional six-week rehearsal process. The actors who took part in the workshop, and who also made up the original cast, were Bruce Alexander, Christian Burgess, Peter-Hugo Daly, Ian Ireland, Fred Pearson, Harriet Walter and Mark Wing-Davey.

Harriet Walter, who played the role of Bert (a boy apprentice), writes of the original production: "I had spent most of the evening under a table scraping out paint tins, and yet I remain prouder of The Ragged Trousered Philanthropists than of most other shows I have been involved with. The reason for this is simple. We had time.... The show belonged to us all. Every experience in the last six months, whether ordeal or treat, had bound our imaginations together and this informed the quality of the work."

Among the many positive reviews of Lowe's play, Irving Wardle wrote of the original production: "...it is an independent work of great skill and integrity, putting the original to the test of physical action and personal experience... for those who still find England blanketed with a thick fog of political evasion it is sheer pleasure to watch this lucid, beautifully organised account of the roots of our present industrial chaos."

There have been many revivals of the play since 1978. In July 1983, John Adams directed the play at the Half Moon Theatre in London, with a cast including Josie Lawrence. In 1985 Stephen Daldry directed a production for Metro Theatre, which toured until 1987. In February 1991, John Adams directed the play again, a touring production for Birmingham Rep; the tour travelled as far as Birmingham, Alabama. Stephen Daldry directed the play again in 1998, with a co-production by Theatre Royal Stratford East and the Liverpool Playhouse. In 2011, Townsend Productions produced a two handed version of Lowe's play which is currently touring the UK.

In 2010 Lowe worked with South African company Isango Portobello on a new version of his play, setting it in 1950s Cape Town. Directed by Mark Dornford-May, with musical direction by Pauline Malefane and Mandisi Dyantyis, The Ragged Trousered Philanthropists – Izigwili Ezidlakazelayo opened at the Fugard Theatre, District Six, Cape Town in October 2010. This production is due to visit the Hackney Empire in May 2012.

== Themes: politics and work ==
The play is about a group of painters and decorators and their struggle for survival in a complacent and stagnating Edwardian England.

Tressell's novel had affected Lowe profoundly, when he first read it as a young man. "My father, unlike Owen in almost every aspect, suffered like him from TB and had been a brickie and decorator before the war. The attitude of the workers to socialism seemed, in my young way, to be exactly like the one I encountered when I heatedly argued with family. In a way, I identified with Owen. Owen also became the father I wanted badly. My relationship with my own father at that time was at its lowest. He, Owen, was a man alone who had not given in. The bastards couldn't grind him down. The analysis of society was not what struck me, because I already... had come to these beliefs. It did not, in that sense, convert me. It did something much more fundamental. It spoke to me directly, out of intense pain, saying "You're not mad. You're not on your own."... It was the nearest to finding a father, a friend across that time, that I had ever known. I tried to persuade anyone to read it. It seemed irresistible to me. It still does."

Apart from politics, a key theme in Lowe's play is work itself. Since physical labour was so central to the novel, it played a large part in the Joint Stock workshop. The company worked in the morning refurbishing an old warehouse as an annexe for Dartington College of Arts, supervised by a professional site foreman.

In the play, apart from their poverty and worries about keeping their job, most of the time the men are also frustrated at not being allowed to do a good job. (The bosses are not really interested in the quality of the work, their main interest is in keeping down costs to make more profit.) So the Moorish room episode, in which Owen is given the chance to use his skills to the full, is a key part of Lowe's play. Even though he knows that his work will only be enjoyed by the bosses, Owen desperately wants to do the job:

OWEN: "Just gi' me the chance of it, eh? I could do a good job. No slapping paint over rotten wood. Hearing the worms chewing away behind the paint. No papering over cracks. Burn the paint right back. Strip it down. Treat the walls. Stop the cracks. Dry it. Clean base. Three coats of white. Clean canvas. No wood that crumbles to dust. No wall to powder. Real work. Just once. I'm due. It's my right."

== Plot ==
The play is about a group of house-painters in Mugsborough in 1906: skilled painters, labourers, an apprentice boy (Bert); and their bosses, site foreman (Crass), works foreman (Hunter), and the owner of the firm (Rushton). Skilled men earn seven pence per hour, labourers five pence and the first year apprentice earns nothing; as works foreman, Hunter gets two per cent of the firm's profits, so he is always looking to screw down costs. Rushton's firm is redecorating a house, The Cave, owned by Mayor Sweater.

Hunter takes on a skilled man (Easton) at cut rate (six and half pence). Easton has been unemployed for a long time, and he and his wife have a baby on the way.

Whenever Hunter visits the site, the men are terrified he will find some excuse to sack them. This time, he gets Crass to suggest whom to sack to make room for Easton. Crass mentions Owen, "wi' his far-fetched ideas", and also "them old men, sir. It’s them what’s holdin’ us back... Allers trying to do it proper.“ Hunter shouts at a terrified Linden – the oldest of the men – for taking too long cleaning down a door before painting. Later, he catches Linden smoking on the job and sacks him on the spot.

When the men break – for breakfast or for their dinner – they often talk about politics. One of them – Owen – is a socialist and he tries to convince his workmates that the cause of the poverty which they all fear is not foreign labour, overpopulation or machines but the capitalist system. Later, he demonstrates the great Money Trick with slices of bread and pocket-knives: showing that in our current system, money only makes the bosses richer while leaving the workers as poor and insecure as ever.

Owen is summoned to see Rushton. The men think he is going to be sacked because of his politics. Instead, he is offered a special job of work, to decorate the drawing-room of The Cave in Moorish style (Mayor Sweater has seen something similar in Paris). Owen, a skilled sign-writer, jumps at the chance of using his skills to the full, even offering to prepare the designs in his own time. Rushton tells Hunter that this job at least must be done properly: three (not two) coats of white paint, and gold leaf (not gold paint). With labour and materials, they estimate that work on the Moorish room will cost about fifteen pounds; but they can charge Mayor Sweater forty-five.

The morning before the annual works outing (the Beano), work on the house is almost finished and the men are worried that there will be a "slaughter". Crass reassures Easton that he (Easton) will be last to be laid off, because he is working at cut rate. Meanwhile, Owen teaches Bert how to apply gold leaf to the pattern in the Moorish room.

The Beano. Outside a country pub, the men relax – play skittles, drink beer, joke and talk (Owen has agreed not to talk about politics for one day). Easton borrows some tackle from the landlord, and takes Bert fishing. When it's time for the meal, they all try to find a seat as far away from Hunter as possible. The men stand while Hunter says grace, but he turns into a sermon (it's Whit, and Hunter is very religious); in the end the men sit down and the waitress starts serving the soup before he's finished.

After they've eaten their fill and are sitting smoking, Crass gives a report on the finances for the Beano. Rushton, Mayor Sweater and some of the other bosses are there now, at another table. There are toasts to Rushton, Hunter and Mayor Sweater, and each replies with a speech. Hunter just gives a few words of thanks; Rushton talks about how the men and the masters depend on each other, "the men work with their hands, the masters with their brains..."; and Mayor Sweater makes a political speech, attacking socialists, "Most of those sorts are chaps who are too lazy to work their livin'". Crass challenges Owen to respond, but when Owen says nothing Crass mocks him as a coward. So, Harlow defends Owen and challenges what Mayor Sweater has said: about socialists; the idea that the men don't use their brains at work and that the men and the masters have common interests. Crass responds by calling for a sing-song; Crass himself sings an anti-political music hall song Two Lovely Black Eyes.

On the last day's work on The Cave, Hunter calls together the skilled men. He tells them that he will only pay six and a half pence an hour from now on: "take it or leave it." The men decide to stand up to Hunter and refuse to work at this new rate, "He's got to have the skilled men." But when Crass tells them that one of them – Easton – is already working at the new rate, the men realise they have to accept it.

Mayor Sweater and his wife give a tea party to show off the Moorish Room, and then hold a secret meeting of Mugsborough council: they agree to get Sweater elected to Parliament.

The last part of the play is a series of interlocking short scenes. Crass and Easton work on a coffin; at Owen's house, Bert makes a child's wheelbarrow (a present for Easton's baby) while Owen paints a banner; Hunter reckons up the final costs of the Moorish Room, his obsession with numbers (the costs) scrambling in his mind with apocalyptic images from the Bible. Philpott collects a coffin plate from Owen (it's for Linden's funeral - he died in the workhouse); Hunter, in the grip of his calculating/religious madness, cuts his wrists. Crass takes over as works foreman. Harlow, sacked by Hunter after the Beano for his "far fetched ideas", comes to persuade Owen to come to a Labour meeting. Owen says, "we've got to hold out for the works, not go for the crumbs", but agrees to come. The play ends with them raising the banner which Owen has been working on: "Workers Unite!"

== Sources ==
- Wardle, Irving, Masterly evening – The Ragged Trousered Philanthropists at Riverside Studios. The Times, 13 October 1978; pg. 11.
- Lowe, Stephen, The Ragged Trousered Philanthropists, based on the book by Robert Tressell. Joint Stock Theatre Company, 1978. Revised ed., London, Methuen, 1983. ISBN 0-413-54400-1
- Lowe, Stephen, Joint Stock and The Ragged Trousered Philanthropists: Letters from a workshop. Theatre Papers no. 2, Dartington College of Arts, 1979. OCLC 78065955
- Masters, Anthony, review of The Ragged Trousered Philanthropists at the Half Moon. The Times, 19 July 1983; pg. 8.
- Kershaw, Baz, Building an unstable pyramid – the fragmentation of British alternative theatre; in New Theatre Quarterly, Volume XI no 36, November 1993; p 348–356.
- Walter, Harriet, Other People's Shoes. Thoughts on Acting. London, Nick Hern Books, 2003. ISBN 978-1-85459-751-9
- Eyre, Richard and Wright, Nicholas, Changing stages: a view of British Theatre in the twentieth century. London, Bloomsbury Publishing, 2000; p286-7. ISBN 0-7475-4789-0
- Gordon, Fiona, Isango Portobello makes magic, review of South African production. 29 Oct 2010.
- The Ragged Trousered Philanthropists at the Fugard, preview article from www.theartsmag.com, October 2010.
- Ragged Trousered Philanthropists page on Stephen Lowe's website.
