= The Ragged-Trousered Philanthropists =

1914 book by Robert Tressell

- 7th reprint
- Author: Robert Tressell
- Genre: Semi-autobiographical novel
- Publisher: Grant Richards Ltd.
- Publication date: 23 April 1914
- Publication place: England
- Media type: Print (hardback and paperback)
- Pages: 391 (first edition)
- OCLC: 7571041
- Text: The Ragged-Trousered Philanthropists at Wikisource

The Ragged-Trousered Philanthropists is a 1914 semi-autobiographical novel by Irish house painter and sign writer Robert Noonan, who wrote the book in his spare time under the pen name Robert Tressell. Published after Tressell's death from tuberculosis in the Liverpool Royal Infirmary in 1911, the novel follows a house painter's efforts to find work in the fictional English town of Mugsborough (based on the coastal town of Hastings) to stave off the workhouse for himself, his wife and his son. The original title page, drawn by Tressell, carried the subtitle: "Being the story of twelve months in Hell, told by one of the damned, and written down by Robert Tressell."

Grant Richards Ltd. published about two-thirds of the manuscript in April 1914 after Tressell's daughter, Kathleen Noonan, showed her father's work to her employers. The 1914 edition not only omitted material but also moved text around and gave the novel a depressing ending. Tressell's original manuscript was first published in 1955 by Lawrence and Wishart.

An explicitly political work, the novel is widely regarded as a classic of working-class literature. As of 2003, it had sold over one million copies. George Orwell described it as "a book that everyone should read".

== Background ==
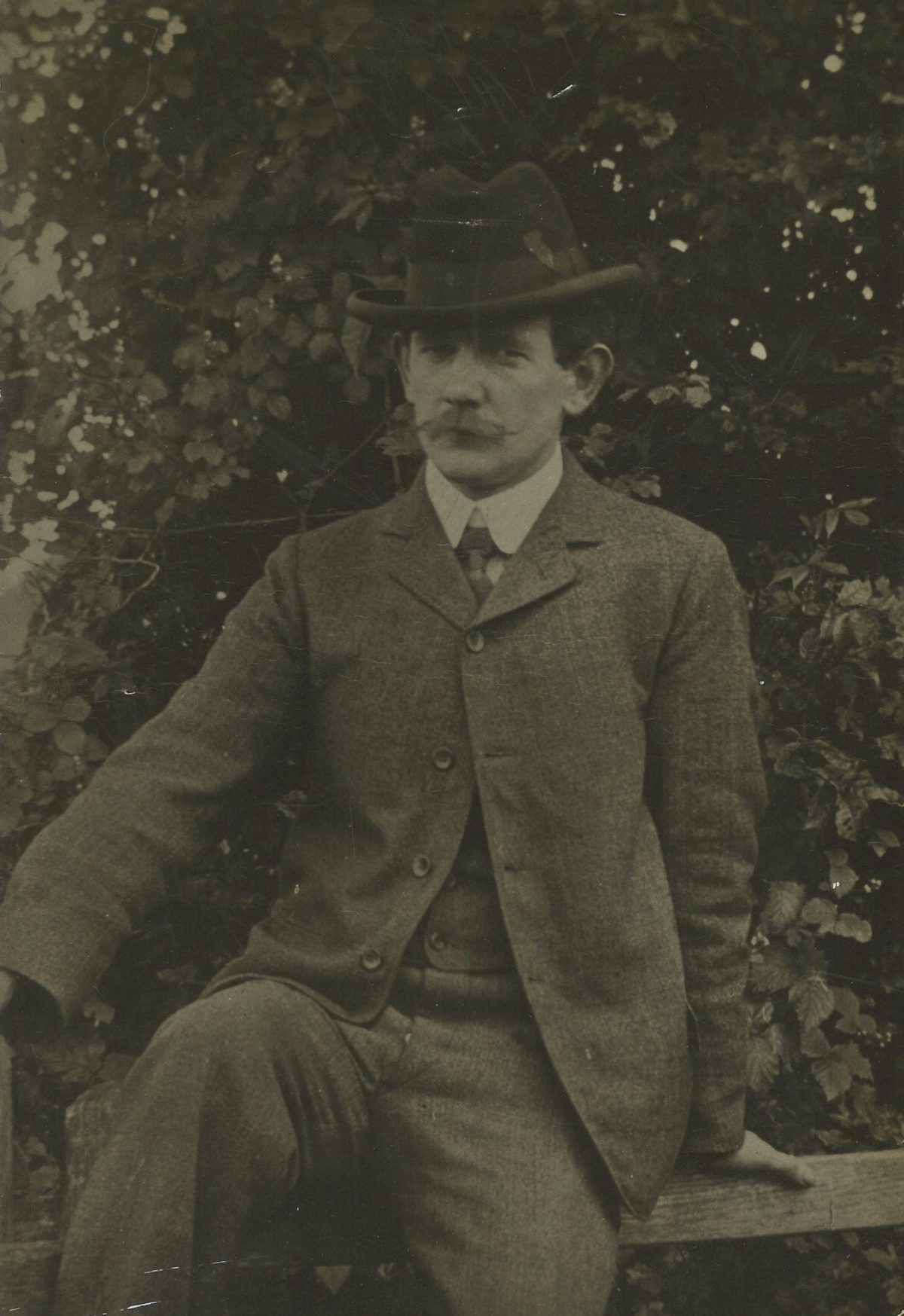
Robert Noonan, c. 1908

Noonan was the illegitimate son of Mary Ann Noonan and Samuel Croker, a retired magistrate. He was born in Dublin in 1870 and settled in England in 1901 after a short spell living and working in South Africa. He chose the pen name Tressell in reference to the trestle table, an important part of his kit as a painter and decorator.

Based on his own experiences of poverty and exploitation, and his terror that he and his daughter, Kathleen — whom he was raising alone — would be consigned to the workhouse if he fell ill, Noonan embarked on a detailed and scathing analysis of the relationship between working-class people and their employers. The "philanthropists" of the title are the workers who, in Tressell's view, acquiesce in their own exploitation in the interests of their bosses. The novel is set in the fictional town of Mugsborough, based on the southern English coastal town of Hastings, where Noonan lived, although its geographical location as described in the book is well away from the actual town of Hastings.

Noonan completed The Ragged-Trousered Philanthropists in 1910, but the 1,600-page hand-written manuscript was rejected by the three publishing houses to which it was submitted. The rejections severely depressed Noonan, and Kathleen Noonan had to save the manuscript from being burnt by keeping it in a metal box under her bed. After her father died of tuberculosis, she showed the manuscript to a friend, the writer Jessie Pope. Pope recommended the book to her own publisher, Grant Richards, who bought the rights in April 1914 for £25 (equal to approximately £2,959 in 2021). A much-abridged version was published that year in the United Kingdom, and an even more abridged version — 90,000 words, from the original 250,000 — in 1918. It was also published in Canada and the United States in 1914, in the Soviet Union in 1920, and in Germany in 1925. The publisher removed much of the socialist ideology from the first edition. An unabridged edition with Noonan's original ending was published in 1955, edited by F. C. Ball, who also wrote two biographies of Tressell, Tressell of Mugsborough (1951), and One of the Damned: The Life and Times of Robert Tressell (1973).

== Plot ==
Clearly frustrated at the refusal of his contemporaries to recognise the inequity and iniquity of society, Tressell's cast of hypocritical Christians, exploitative capitalists and corrupt councillors provide a backdrop for his main target: the workers who think that a better life is "not for the likes of them". Hence the title of the book; Tressell paints the workers as "philanthropists" who throw themselves into back-breaking work for poverty wages to generate profit for their masters.

One of the characters, Frank Owen, is a socialist who tries to convince his fellow workers that capitalism is the real source of the poverty he sees all around him, but their education has trained them to distrust their own thoughts and to rely on those of their "betters". Much of the book consists of conversations between Owen and the others, or more often of lectures by Owen in the face of their jeering; this was presumably based on Tressell's own experiences.

== Major themes ==
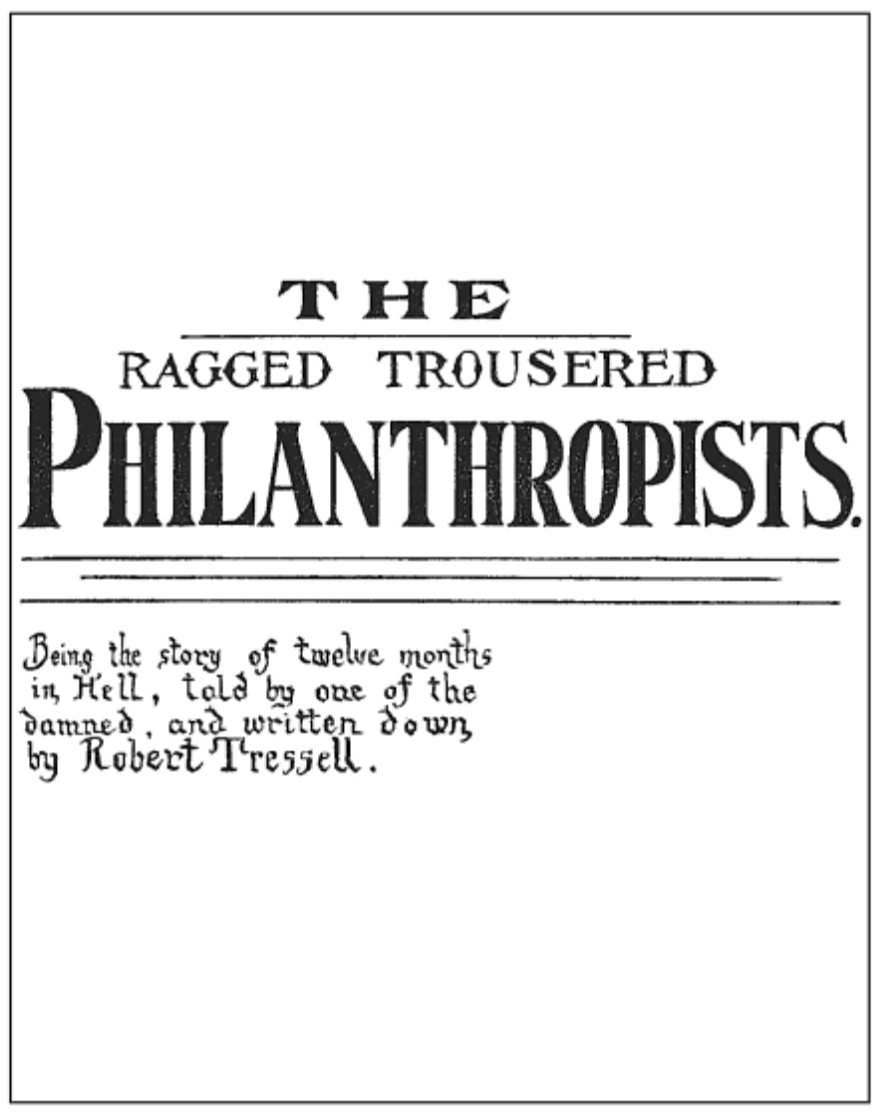
Original title page, drawn by Robert Tressell

The book provides a comprehensive picture of social, political, economic and cultural life in Britain at a time when socialism was beginning to gain ground. It was around that time that the Labour Party was founded and began to win seats in the House of Commons.

The book advocates a socialist society in which work is performed to satisfy the needs of all, rather than to generate profit for a few. A significant chapter is "The Great Money Trick", in which Owen organises a mock-up of capitalism with his workmates, using slices of bread as raw materials and knives as machinery. Owen 'employs' his workmates cutting up the bread to illustrate that the employer, who does not work, generates personal wealth while the workers effectively remain no better off than when they began, endlessly swapping coins back and forth for food and wages. This is Tressell's practical way of illustrating the Marxist theory of surplus value, which in the capitalist system is generated by labour.

The three-storeyed house that is under renovation in the book, referred to frequently as the "job", is known by the workmen as "The Cave": "There were, altogether, about twenty-five men working there, carpenters, plumbers, plasterers, bricklayers and painters, besides several unskilled labourers ... The air was full of the sounds of hammering and sawing, the ringing of trowels, the rattle of pails, the splashing of water brushes and the scraping of the stripping knives. It was also heavily laden with dust and disease germs, powdered mortar, lime, plaster, and the dirt that had been accumulating within the old house for years. In brief, those employed there might be said to be living in a Tariff Reform Paradise—they had Plenty of Work."

Given the author's interest in the philosophy of Plato, it is highly likely that "the Cave" is a reference to Plato's "Allegory of the Cave". A major recurring theme in Tressell's book highlights the inability and reluctance of the workers to comprehend, or even consider, an alternative economic system. The author attributes this inability, amongst other things, to the fact that they have never experienced an alternative system, and have been raised as children to unquestioningly accept the status quo, whether or not it is in their interests. In Plato's work, the underlying narrative suggests that in the absence of an alternative, human beings will submit to their present condition and consider it normal, no matter how contrived the circumstances. Owen sets out his view in the first chapter:

What we call civilisation—the accumulation of knowledge which has come down to us from our forefathers—is the fruit of thousands of years of human thought and toil. It is not the result of the labour of the ancestors of any separate class of people who exist today, and therefore it is by right the common heritage of all. Every little child that is born into the world, no matter whether he is clever or dull, whether he is physically perfect or lame, or blind; no matter how much he may excel or fall short of his fellows in other respects, in one thing at least he is their equal—he is one of the heirs of all the ages that have gone before.

== Critical reception ==
Writing in the Manchester Evening News in April 1946 George Orwell praised the book's ability to convey "[w]ithout sensationalism and almost without plot ... the actual detail of manual work and the tiny things almost unimaginable to any comfortably situated person which make life a misery when one's income drops below a certain level". He considered it "a book that everyone should read" and a piece of social history that left one "with the feeling that a considerable novelist was lost in this young working-man whom society could not bother to keep alive".

In 1979 Jonah Raskin described The Ragged-Trousered Philanthropists as "a classic of modern British literature, that ought to rank with the work of Thomas Hardy, D. H. Lawrence, and James Joyce, and yet is largely unknown ... Tressell's bitterness and anger are mixed with compassion, sympathy and a sharp sense of humour." According to David Harker, by 2003 the book had sold over a million copies, and had been printed five times in Germany, four in Russia, three in the United States, and two in Australia and Canada; it had also been published in Bulgarian, Czech, Dutch and Japanese.

== Adaptations ==
- A graphic novel, by sisters Scarlett and Sophie Rickard and edited by David Hine was published by SelfMadeHero in the UK September 2020, in the US and Canada in December 2021, and in French translation by Delcourt in April 2023. It was nominated for 'best adaptation from another medium' in the 2022 Eisner Awards.

=== Stage ===
- A stage adaptation written and directed by Bill Owen was performed by the Unity Theatre troupe in London from May to November 1949. It ran for 130 performances and was seen by over 25,000 people.
- A stage adaptation, written by Stephen Lowe and directed by William Gaskill, was first performed by Joint Stock Theatre Company in Plymouth on 14 September 1978. It opened at the Riverside Studios, Hammersmith on 12 October 1978.
- A stage adaptation, written by Archie Hind and directed by David Hayman, was performed in 1984 by the Scottish agitprop theatre company 7:84.
- A stage adaptation was commissioned by the Public and Commercial Services Union for "Unions 08". The play, by Tom Mclennan, is still running and on its third consecutive year of touring. The Tressell Society said of the adaptation: "This is the best production of this important work we have ever seen."
- A stage adaptation, written by Howard Brenton and directed by Christopher Morahan, opened at the Liverpool Everyman on 17 June 2010 and subsequently transferred to co-producer the Minerva Theatre in Chichester on 15 July.
- A two-handed version by Neil Gore debuted at the Hertford Theatre in July 2011, its tour including to the 2012 Edinburgh Festival Fringe. In 2018, Gore was invited by Dan Carden to perform for MPs in Parliament.
- In 2008, an adaptation by Tom Mclennan, was commissioned by the PCS Union as part of its contribution to the 2008 Liverpool Capital of Culture events. It was performed at various venues in Liverpool and later in Hastings at an event organised by the Tressell Society.
- Merseyside Young Labour, using an adaptation by Tom Mclennan, performed it as a fundraiser in August 2013, setting ticket prices as 'Pay What You Can Afford', in keeping with the book's values.

=== Television ===
A television adaptation in the Theatre 625 series was transmitted on BBC2 on 29 May 1967, starring Edward Fox as Barrington and Alan Wade as Bert the barrow boy, who feature on the front cover of the contemporary paperback. This adaptation no longer exists.

=== Radio ===
- A 6 x 60-minute radio adaptation was transmitted as a "Classic Serial" on BBC Radio 4 in 1989. It starred Sean Barrett, Brian Glover and Peter Vaughan. It was produced by Michael Bakewell and dramatised by Gregory Evans. It was most recently repeated on BBC Radio 4 Extra in April 2024.
- An adaptation was made by Above the Title Productions for BBC radio in 2008, produced by Rebecca Pinfield and Johnny Vegas, and directed by Dirk Maggs. Three 60-minute episodes were broadcast as the Classic Serial on Radio 4. Actors included Andrew Lincoln (Owen), Johnny Vegas (Easton), Timothy Spall (Crass), Paul Whitehouse (Old Misery), John Prescott (Policeman), Bill Bailey (Rushton), Kevin Eldon (Slyme), and Tony Haygarth (Philpot). This adaptation was nominated for a Sony Radio Drama Award in 2009.
- In May 2009, Radio 4 broadcast a two-part sequel called Mugsborough 1917, which featured many of the cast from the previous year's production. The dramatisation by Andrew Lynch picked up the story and characters 10 years on.

== Documentary ==
A short documentary about Tressell, the manuscript and the book's impact was produced by Shut Out The Light in 2014. Contributors included Dennis Skinner, Len McCluskey, Ricky Tomlinson, Stephen Lowe and Neil Gore. The film was described as "an elegant celebration of the centenary of the book's first publication".

== See also ==
- A Very British Coup – the book can be seen being read by the former girlfriend of the British Prime Minister
- Social novel
