= Aisling Loftus =

English actress

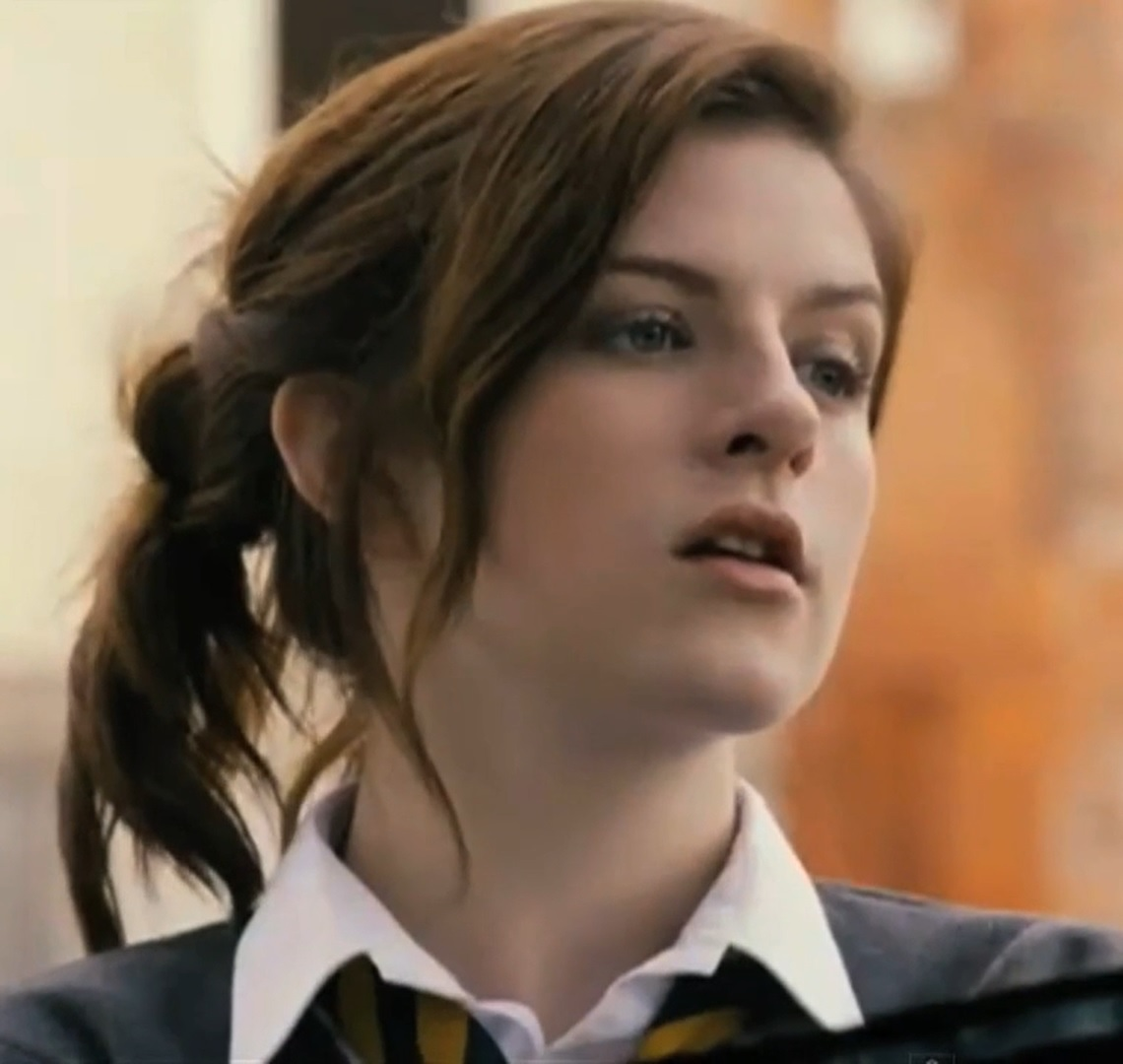
- Loftus in Death of a Superhero (2011)
- Born: Aisling Sinead Katie Loftus; 1 September 1990 (age 36); Nottingham, England
- Occupation: Actress
- Years active: 2000–present
- Spouse: Jacob Anderson (m. 2018)
- Children: 2

Aisling Sinead Katie Loftus (born 1 September 1990) is a British actress. She began her career as a child actress and first gained prominence through her roles in the BBC dramas Five Daughters (2010) and Dive (2010), the play Spur of the Moment, and the film Death of a Superhero (2011).

She has since appeared in the ITV period drama Mr Selfridge (2013–2015), the BBC series War & Peace (2016) and Broken (2017), and the Sky series A Discovery of Witches (2018–2022) and The Midwich Cuckoos (2022). Her performance in the film Property of the State (2016) earned her an IFTA nomination.

== Early life and education ==
Loftus was born in Nottingham to Irish parents Paddy and Eileen from Drumcondra, Dublin and Roscrea, County Tipperary; she has an older sister. Throughout her childhood she visited family in Ireland for holidays, in Dublin, Tipperary, Cork, Kerry, Galway and Clare.

Loftus attended St Edmund Campion Catholic Primary School in West Bridgford and later completed A Levels in English literature, drama and history at the Becket School in Wilford. She was nine when she discovered acting; she took classes at the Television Workshop, and participated in the National Theatre Connections. She considered going to drama school, but decided against it when she was cast in Dive whilst on study leave.

== Career ==
Loftus made her television debut in a 2000 episode of the ITV medical drama Peak Practice. This was followed by guest appearances in the CITV series Help! I'm a Teenage Outlaw as well as Casualty, Doctors, and The Bill. In 2009, she starred as Amy in the ITV comedy-drama television film The Fattest Man in Britain, and the titular character of Daniel Elliott's short Jade, which won Silver Bear for Best Short Film at the Berlin International Film Festival in 2009. Loftus was named a 2009 Screen International Star of Tomorrow.

In 2010, Loftus starred in the BBC dramas Five Daughters and Dive as Gemma Adams and Lindsey respectively. In her review of Dive, Euan Ferguson of The Observer predicted that Aisling "Ash" Loftus would be a "phenomenon." That same year, Loftus made her London stage debut as Leonie Fowler in Spur of the Moment by Anya Reiss at the Royal Court Theatre. Dominic Cavendish of The Daily Telegraph called her "superb." She also appeared in the Australian film Oranges and Sunshine and the Sky One crime drama Thorne: Sleepyhead.

Loftus starred in the 2011 Irish film Death of a Superhero, for which she was awarded the Special Jury Prize by critics at the 2012 Dublin International Film Festival. She also starred in the television films, as Melissa Legge on BBC Two's Page Eight, and as Arrietty Clock in the BBC One's The Borrowers. as well as the play Noises Off for its Old Vic and Novello Theatre runs, marking her West End debut. This was followed in by roles as Jade in the BBC miniseries Public Enemies, and as Cassandra in Good Cop.

In 2013, Loftus began starring as Agnes Towler in the ITV period drama Mr. Selfridge, a role she would play for the first three series. In 2016, she played Sonya Rostova in the BBC adaptation of War & Peace, and appeared in the films Pride & Prejudice & Zombies and Property of the State. For the latter, she was nominated for Best Lead Actress in a Film at the 14th Irish Film & Television Awards.

In 2017, she played Joan in the 40th anniversary production of Stephen Lowe's Touched at Nottingham Playhouse alongside fellow Television Workshop alumni. and Anne in The Treatment at the Almeida Theatre. She appeared in the film Gun Shy, and played PC Dawn Morris in the BBC series Broken.

Loftus played Sophie Wilson and later Susanna Norman in the 2018 Sky fantasy series A Discovery of Witches. She appeared in Aristocrats at the Donmar Warehouse. She originated the role of Queenie in Helen Edmundson's 2019 stage adaptation of Small Island at the National Theatre. She returned to the Donmar Warehouse with Far Away in 2020. Loftus starred in the film Homebound and the Sky Max science fiction series The Midwich Cuckoos.

In 2024, Loftus played Mia in the BBC Radio 4 drama Sabine.

== Personal life ==
In December 2018, Loftus married actor Jacob Anderson at the Ace Hotel (now One Hundred Shoreditch). They have two daughters. The couple's first daughter was born in 2020.

== Acting credits ==
=== Film ===
Year	Title	Role	Notes
2006	This Is England		Scene cut from theatrical release
2006	Blind Man's Alley	Player 4	Short film
2009	Jade	Jade	Short film; Berlinale Silver Bear winner
2010	Oranges and Sunshine	Susie	
2011	Death of a Superhero	Shelly	
2011	Cardinal	Envy	Short film
2013	Cash Cow	Sophie	
2014	Educator	Lydia	
2015	Auld Lang Syne	Laura Hammond	Short film
2016	Pride & Prejudice & Zombies	Charlotte	
2016	Property of the State	Ann Marie	
2016	Tuesday	Sophie	Short film
2017	Gun Shy	Marybeth	
2019	Small Island	Queenie	National Theatre Live
2021	Homebound	Holly	
2024	Homework		Short film
2026	After Birth	Ma	Short film

=== Television ===
Year	Title	Role	Notes
2000	Peak Practice	Abby Moffett	Episode: "Electricity"
2001	A Fish Out of Water	Angela	Television film
2004	Help! I'm a Teenage Outlaw	Montague's Food Tester	Episode: "Betrayal"
2005, 2008	Doctors	Emma Tyler / Ellie Lowell	2 episodes
2006, 2008	Casualty	Mellie Bennett / Jo Balmayne	2 episodes
2008	The Bill	Sophie Randall	2 episodes
2009	The Fattest Man in Britain	Amy	Television film
2010	Five Daughters	Gemma Adams	Miniseries; 2 episodes
2010	Dive	Lindsey	Television film
2010	Thorne: Sleepyhead	Rachel	2-part drama
2011	Case Histories	Lily Rose / Tanya	2 episodes
2011	Page Eight	Melissa Legge	Television film
2011	The Borrowers	Arrietty Clock	Television film
2012	Public Enemies	Jade	Miniseries; 2 episodes
2012	Good Cop	Cassandra	Miniseries
2012	Little Crackers	Maria	Christmas special
2013–2015	Mr Selfridge	Agnes Towler / Leclair	Main role (series 1–3)
2016	War & Peace	Sonya Rostova	Main role
2017	Broken	PC Dawn Morris	Main role; 3 episodes
2017	Midsomer Murders	Tegan Langton	1 episode
2018–2022	A Discovery of Witches	Sophie Wilson / Susanna Norman	Main role; 14 episodes
2022	The Midwich Cuckoos	Zoë Moran	Main role
2024	Sherwood	Sandy Waters	6 episodes
2027	The Ministry of Time	Anne Spencer	TBD

=== Theatre ===
Year	Title	Role	Notes
2010	Spur of the Moment	Leonie Fowler	Royal Court Theatre, London
2011	Noises Off	Poppy Norton-Taylor	The Old Vic / Novello Theatre, London
2014	The Hotel Plays	Girl	Langham Hotel, London
2017	The Treatment	Anne	Almeida Theatre, London
2017	Touched	Joan	Nottingham Playhouse, Nottingham
2018	Aristocrats	Claire	Donmar Warehouse, London
2019	Small Island	Queenie	Royal National Theatre, London
2020	Far Away	Joan	Donmar Warehouse, London
2025	Girls and Boys	Performer	Nottingham Playhouse, Nottingham
2025	Till the Stars Come Down	Maggie	Theatre Royal Haymarket, London
2026	I Had a Wheelbarrow		The Nest
2027	A Whistle in the Dark	Betty	Royal National Theatre, London
2027	Death of a Salesman	Miss Forsythe	Royal National Theatre, London

== Awards and nominations ==
Year	Award	Category	Work	Result	Ref.
2009	Screen International	Star of Tomorrow	Career achievement so far	Won	
2012	Dublin International Film Festival	Special Jury Prize	Death of a Superhero	Won	
2015	BBC Audio Drama Awards	Best Actress in an Audio Drama	Educator	Won	
2017	Irish Film & Television Awards	Best Actress in a Lead Role – Film	Property of the State	Nominated	
2026	Unrestricted View Horror Film Festival Awards	Best Actress in a Short Film	After Birth	Nominated	

== See also ==
- List of Irish actors
