= Who Is Erin Carter? =

2023 British thriller television miniseries

- Genre: Action; Thriller; Drama
- Written by: Jack Lothian
- Directed by: Bill Eagles; Ashley Way; Savina Dellicour
- Starring: Evin Ahmad; Sean Teale; Indica Watson; Pep Ambròs; Denise Gough; Douglas Henshall
- Music by: Jack Halama
- Countries of origin: United Kingdom; United States
- Original languages: English; Spanish; Catalan
- No. of seasons: 1
- No. of episodes: 7

Production
- Executive producers: Andy Harries; Rob Bullock; Jack Lothian
- Producers: Nuala O'Leary (series producer); Charlotte Essex; Tabitha Jenkins
- Production location: Barcelona
- Cinematography: Fabrizio Fontemaggi
- Production companies: Left Bank Pictures; Sony Pictures Television

Original release
- Network: Netflix
- Release: 24 August 2023

Who Is Erin Carter? is a British thriller television miniseries on Netflix. The series centres upon Erin Carter, a British-born schoolteacher living in Barcelona, Spain, with her husband and daughter, who during the course of an armed hold-up at a grocery store is forced to defend herself and her daughter by neutralising one of the assailants using her highly skilled fighting abilities, which raises questions about her identity and past, and threatens the life she has made with her family.

The series, consisting of seven episodes, premiered on 24 August 2023.

== Cast ==
- Evin Ahmad as Erin Carter
- Sean Teale as Jordi Collantes
- Indica Watson as Harper Carter
- Pep Ambròs as Emilio Martin
- Douglas Henshall as Daniel Lang
- Denise Gough as Lena Campbell
- Susannah Fielding as Olivia Thorne
- Charlotte Vega as Penelope Reyna
- Jamie Bamber as DI Jim Armstrong

== Episodes ==
No.	Title	Directed by	Written by	Original release date
1	"Episode 1"	Ashley Way	Jack Lothian	24 August 2023
Erin Carter flees Folkestone with her adoptive daughter Harper on a boat overseas. Five years later, Erin has found work as a part-time supply teacher at a St Johns international school in Barcelona, where ten-year old Harper is a student. Erin also lives with her husband Jordi, who works as an emergency nurse. Erin and Harper are caught up in a robbery at a supermarket. Erin subdues one of the robbers while the second robber escapes. At the hospital, Erin encounters the robber who recognizes her before dying under suspicious circumstances. The police inspector suspects Erin but lacks evidence. The second robber, Margot Muller, later confronts Erin during a school concert. Erin kills Muller and hides her body with the help of police detective and neighbour Emilio. In a subplot, Erin blackmails neighbour Penelope into dropping her complaint against Harper by blackmailing her about an affair with her tennis coach.
2	"Episode 2"	Ashley Way	Jack Lothian	24 August 2023
Harper is haunted by a past trauma and sees manifestations of a mysterious figure with a deer's head. Emilio enlists Erin's help in spying on a crooked lawyer named Agustín. However, Erin is discovered and escapes by jumping off a high balcony into the sea. Erin later attends an unsuccessful job interview for a full-time teaching position at Harper's school. Penelope denies any involvement in Erin's unsuccessful application. After assigning her school administrator friend Olivia to babysit Harper, Erin rescues Emilio from Agustín and his henchmen. Agustín pursues Erin and threatens to upload a photo of her but is run over by Emilio. At Folkestone prison, Lena gazes at a photo of Erin and Harper.
3	"Episode 3"	Ashley Way	Adam Gyngell; Fred Armesto; Jack Lothian	24 August 2023
Erin juggles between parenting and her undercover life. She visits Agustín's associate Valeria in an attempt to convince her to delete a photo of her. However, they are attacked by criminals serving Agustín's mysterious underworld boss. In the process, Valeria loses money she had stolen from Agustín's boss. After the two women escape, Erin is forced to pawn her jewellery to obtain funds to compensate Valeria. Jordi arranges for the traumatised Harper to see a psychologist despite Erin's objections. Penelope also takes advantage of Erin's absence to ingratiate herself with Harper. Meanwhile, the wealthy Daniel Lang hires Erin as a private tutor for his troubled son. Erin is forced to delay her meeting with Valeria in order to participate in a tennis match at Harper's request. When Erin meets up with Valeria, the two are pursued by criminals, who kill Valeria. Erin manages to escape by jumping off a bridge onto a truck. Elsewhere, Lena learns about the death of Margot Muller after local police discover her remains.
4	"Episode 4"	Bill Eagles	Jack Lothian	24 August 2023
In a flashback sequence, Erin (under her real – never mentioned – name) is abandoned as a six-year old child and goes through several foster homes and institutions. She becomes a police cadet but is expelled after assaulting a fellow cadet. She is recruited by Detective Inspector Jim Armstrong into "Centralised Intelligence and Operations", which specialises in infiltrating criminal and extremist organisations. Armstrong assigns her the pseudonym Kate Jones, with the job of infiltrating Thomas Ramsey's gang, which is believed to be funded by a mysterious financier. While part of Thomas' gang, she befriends fellow gang member Lena and her five-year old daughter Harper. Thomas' gang steals a gold delivery at Harwich. However, they are ambushed and pursued by police, who track them down to their base. During the gunfight, she flees with Harper after Lena is gunned down. While Armstrong is jubilant, she is upset and conflicted about her role in Lena's presumed death. She severs contact with Armstrong, switches to the pseudonym Erin Carter, and flees with Harper to Spain.
5	"Episode 5"	Ashley Way; Savina Dellicour	Jack Lothian	24 August 2023
Erin awakes at a hospital in Tarragona and escapes local police with the help of Emilio. After returning to Jordi and Harper, Erin tries to hide her double life by claiming she struggles with alcoholism. Harper later tells Erin that she knows that Lena is her biological mother. While Harper attends a school prom with Antonio, Erin tells Jordi that she is not Harper's biological mother, which upsets him. Meanwhile, Emilio continues his investigation into a criminal syndicate involved in drug smuggling. While investigating illegal betting at a bull ring, Emilio is captured and fatally wounded by Daniel, who reveals himself to be the mysterious syndicate boss. Erin arrives too late to save Emilio. Back in the United Kingdom, Lena escapes while being transported in a prison van.
6	"Episode 6"	Savina Dellicour	Jack Lothian	24 August 2023
Following Emilio's funeral, Jordi separates from Erin and takes Harper on a holiday to see his family in Canyelles. Daniel warns Erin to remain silent by threatening her family about Emilio's murder while funding Emilio's son's education. Lena arrives in Barcelona and forces Olivia to reveal Erin's whereabouts. Erin confronts Daniel a second time at his mansion but retreats after he threatens her family again. Lena catches up with Erin and demands that she take her to see Harper in Canyelles. In an attempt to make amends, Erin leads her to the hiding spot for the stolen gold from Harwich. Lena takes the gold but shoots Erin in the stomach, leaving her for dead.
7	"Episode 7"	Bill Eagles	Jack Lothian	24 August 2023
While visiting Erin and Jordi's home, Lena is captured by Daniel's henchmen. Lena reveals that Erin was the police informant who sabotaged the Harwich heist. In order to reunite with Harper, Lena trades the gold. Meanwhile, a wounded Erin returns home where she reveals her true identity as a police informant to Jordi and Harper. Lena briefly reunites with her daughter Harper. However, Daniel's henchmen kidnap Jordi and Harper in an attempt to force Erin out. After escaping Daniel's assassins, Erin and Lena join forces to rescue Harper and Jordi. Lena sacrifices herself to take out several of Daniel's henchmen. Erin kills Daniel and rescues her family. While holidaying with her family, Erin encounters Armstrong, who seeks to recruit her for future undercover operations.

== Reception ==
Upon release the series emerged as the most watched Netflix series in 82 countries, topping the Netflix Global Top 10. The review aggregator website Rotten Tomatoes reported a 67% approval rating with an average rating of 6.7/10, based on 12 critic reviews. The website's critics consensus reads, "Old school for both good and ill, Who Is Erin Carter strains credulity but clearly identifies Evin Ahmad as an engaging action star." Metacritic, which uses a weighted average, assigned a score of 62 out of 100 based on 5 critics, indicating "generally favorable" reviews. In its review Time wrote "Erin Carter possesses all the elements of an addictive, old-school action drama". Writing in The Guardian, Lucy Mangan awarded it one star out of five in an article headlined "Who Is Erin Carter? – the real question is: who cares?" She remarked: "For those of you who remember the early 90s, think of it as Eldorado with a crime thriller element that no one cares about."
