= Isango Ensemble =

Cape Town based theatre company

The Isango Ensemble (isango meaning "gate" or "port" or "gateway" in Xhosa and Zulu) is a Cape Town-based theatre company led by director Mark Dornford-May and music directors Pauline Malefane and Mandisi Dyantyis. It was established in 2000, when Dornford-May and conductor Charles Hazlewood travelled to South Africa to form a lyric theatre company for the Spier Festival; most of the company members are drawn from the townships around Cape Town. The company’s work focuses on re-imagining classics from the Western theatre canon, finding a new context for the stories within a South African or township setting.

== History ==
In 2007 Isango premiered their productions The Magic Flute - Impempe Yomlingo and A Christmas Carol - Ikrismas Kherol at the Baxter Theatre, Cape Town. These productions then transferred to London's Young Vic Theatre, winning the Whatsonstage Theatre Goers Choice Award for Best Off-West End Production.

The Magic Flute - Impempe Yomlingo transferred into London's West End in 2008, playing at the Duke of York's Theatre and winning the Olivier Award for Best Musical Revival in 2008. The production went on to tour internationally, receiving the Globes de Cristal for Best Opera in Paris.

In 2009, Isango opened their new production of The Mysteries - Yiimimangaliso at the Baxter Theatre, Cape Town. The production then transferred into London's Garrick Theatre, and was revived in 2015 at Shakespeare's Globe.

From June 2009 to February 2010, Isango oversaw the development of the Fugard Theatre in Cape Town, funded by producer Eric Abraham, which opened on 12 February 2010. The opening season included The Magic Flute - Impempe Yomlingo and The Mysteries - Yiimimangaliso. Isango remained company in residence for theatre's first new season, premiering two new productions, Aesop's Fables and The Ragged Trousered Philanthropists - Izigwili Ezidlakazelayo.

In November 2010 Dornford-May wrote an opinion piece for a South African newspaper, in which he deplored the 'White Face' of South African theatre and the lack of critics who could speak any African language. After publication he received much criticism in the press from the art establishment, and later that month Dornford-May and his all-black South African acting company were thrown out of the Fugard Theatre after less than a year, amid claims of poor box office takings.
