= Amy Cudden =

British actress

- Education: University of Leeds/Bretton Hall College of Education; Oxford School of Drama
- Occupations: Actress; director; teacher
- Years active: 2008–present
- Television: Coronation Street
- Children: At least 1

Amy Cudden is a British actress, writer, director and teacher. She is from Norfolk but later moved to Essex. She began attending local theatre school as a child and later joined the Maddermarket Theatre, where she performed in various plays. She studied at the Bretton Hall College of Education/ University of Leeds and later did a postgraduate degree at the Oxford School of Drama. Cudden received critical recognition for her work in the theatre productions of Shallow Slumber (2012), The Village Bike (2012), Tonight at 8.30 (2014) and After Miss Julie (2016). She also performed in various other productions, including Occupational Hazards (2017) and One Man, Two Guvnors (2019), as well as playing Anne Boleyn in The Last Days of Anne Boleyn at the Tower of London.

Cudden has appeared in television shows such as Casualty, Doctor Who, Doctors, Vera, Holby City, PhoneShop, Am I Being Unreasonable?, Mr Bates vs The Post Office, The Girlfriend Experience and The Midwich Cuckoos. She also appeared in various other productions and short films. Cudden had a role in the 2025 film Steve, and later that year, she began portraying Becky Swain on the soap opera Coronation Street for a four-month stint, which she also played in Corriedale. Additionally, Cudden has directed plays and also taught at the London Academy of Music and Dramatic Art.

== Life and career ==
Amy Cudden is from Norfolk and spent the majority of her life in Norwich, though she later moved to Essex. She enjoyed performing from a young age and liked connecting with people. When she was a child, she enjoyed reading books and considered her father a "great storyteller", which she believes led to her pursuing a career in performing, as she wanted to continue telling stories. When she was roughly 12 years old, she began taking part in a Saturday local theatre school, where they would put on an annual show. She later joined a theatre company in the Maddermarket Theatre, where they put on plays such as a tour of The Metamorphosis in secondary schools, as well as The Resistible Rise of Arturo Ui and Restoration comedies. Cudden graduated with a degree from Bretton Hall College of Education/ University of Leeds as a theatre practitioner and later did a postgraduate degree at the Oxford School of Drama, where she felt that she received her first "proper acting training". Whilst studying at the latter, she performed in an open-air adaptation of A Midsummer Night's Dream at Blenheim Palace, where the arena was made of hay bales; she considered it hard work but also fun.

Cudden played Molly in three episodes of the 23rd series of the medical drama series Casualty, which were broadcast in 2008 and 2009. She also played DS Pierce in the show on another occasion. Cudden portrayed Anita in the 2011 Doctor Who episode "Let's Kill Hitler". She really liked her experience in the show and found working in the spaceship set "the most fun ever". That same year, Cudden also had a guest appearance in the third episode of the first series of the crime drama Vera. She also had a guest appearance in a 2011 episode of the second series of the British sitcom PhoneShop, where she played a stalker.

In 2012, Cudden starred in the two-hander play Shallow Slumber along with Alexandra Gilbreath at the Soho Theatre. Cudden considered the play to be one of her favourites that she had been in but added that the show was "very intense and a bit of an emotional marathon". She later said of the production in 2025 that she would never forget the experience and that she "came out feeling like I've chosen the right thing to do". Tom Wicker from Exeunt Magazine wrote that Cudden gave "a performance of ferocious power that distracts from the overly self-aware speeches that Lee occasionally puts in her character's mouth. Emotionally cunning one minute, she is raw and desperate the next". Carole Gordon from WhatsOnStage.com gave the play three out of five stars and wrote, "Cudden's Dawn is resigned to her fate of tabloid-story single mum and never steps outside of that stereotype". Later that year, Cudden starred as lead character Becky in The Village Bike at the Crucible Theatre. Cudden considered the play to be one of her favourite plays she had performed in and felt very "lucky" to be part of it, also calling her character "one of the most complex, funny, dark, and witty characters I've read written for a woman". John Murphy from Exeunt Magazine praised Cudden's performance, writing:

"As Becky, Amy Cudden is never off the stage; she's in every scene and has to carry the production pretty much on her own. She's superb in the role, a real star in the making, conveying both Becky's sexual frustration and her growing sense of panic. Strong as she is in the role, she never overshadows the supporting cast".

Between April and July 2014, Cudden was part of the ensemble cast of Tonight at 8.30, a theatre production consisting of nine short plays, which toured at various theatres in England. Robert Tanitch from British Theatre Guide praised Cudden's performance in the play. Rhiannon McDowall from Manchester Evening News praised Cudden and Kirsty Besterman for providing "delightfully light accompaniment" in the final play of the show. Cudden guest-starred as Sylvia Carriere in the BBC soap opera Doctors in the episode originally airing on 26 March 2015. She had a guest role in a series 18 episode of the British medical drama television series Holby City, "The Hope That Kills", which originally aired in January 2016. In 2016, it was announced that Cudden would play Christine in After Miss Julie, which was initially performed at the Theatre Royal, Bath, that May before touring the UK. A writer from The Lady wrote that Cudden played her role with "knowing primness".

From April to June 2017, Cudden played JD in Occupational Hazards at Hampstead Theatre. The production was also broadcast on BBC Radio 4. In April 2018, it was reported that Cudden would portray Anne Boleyn in the new 35-minute play The Last Days of Anne Boleyn at the Tower of London, which revolved around Boleyn's imprisonment, trial and execution; the play ran twice a day from Fridays to Tuesdays between 6 May and 28 August 2018. The following year, Cudden played Rachel Crabbe in One Man, Two Guvnors, which was performed at the Theatre Royal Haymarket. Cudden found the play humorous. Cudden guest-starred in a 2021 episode of The Girlfriend Experience. In 2022, Cudden portrayed Sarah McLean in several episodes of the science fiction television series The Midwich Cuckoos. That same year, she briefly appeared in a scene in Am I Being Unreasonable?, and later returned for two episodes in 2025. The actress explained, "I was in a tiny scene in the first series, and Daisy May Cooper improvised a line calling me "Daniel Radcliffe", leading to me being brought back as 'Daniel Radcliffe's mum' in the second series because I apparently look like Harry Potter". She considered the show to be like a family. Cudden later guest-starred again on Doctors as a different character, Lisa Caldwell, in the episode originally airing on 6 November 2023. Cudden had a guest role in a 2023 episode of Father Brown as part of its tenth season. In 2024, Cudden appeared in the first episode of two shows – British television drama series Mr Bates vs The Post Office and the American war drama miniseries Masters of the Air. Mr Bates vs The Post Office was Cudden's favourite television drama that she appeared in, and she said that she was "horrified" when she read the scripts, as she did not know much about the British Post Office scandal, which the show is based on. That same year, it was announced that Cudden had been cast in the drama film Steve, which was released the following year.

In the episode originally airing on 5 September 2025, Cudden debuted on the British soap opera Coronation Street as an unknown character. Cudden's character was soon revealed to be Becky Swain, the estranged wife of established character Lisa Swain, who had faked her death. Cudden called joining the soap "incredible", adding, "Coronation Street is a monolith of British TV, my mum remembers watching the first episode with her own mum. All the things I wanted when I was 17-18 and decided to be an actor – to tell stories, be different people, connect with people – are happening. I'm genuinely blown away and so happy." Before being cast on the soap, Cudden had received a request to send in a self-tape for a character who matched Becky's description, although the names were disguised. She then did an in-person chemistry read with Myers, and Cudden was later called in to do a different scene showing a different side to the character due to Becky being "complicated". She said of the experience, "This was more intimidating with a full camera crew. It explored a darker side of the character and the chemistry with the two other significant people she'd be interacting with." Two weeks later, she was playing Roblox with her son and had to stop the game when her agent called her to tell her she had received the role; Cudden then told her son, who "rolled his eyes" and went back to playing the game. Afterwards, Cudden only told her mother, husband and a few close friends that she had been cast as Becky, as she wanted to keep Becky's debut a secret for viewers, explaining, "It would have felt very disrespectful to give the secret away". The actress also initially assumed that the part was a guest role and did not think that she would receive it. The actress spoke to producer Kate Brooks about Becky's character and revealed that she contributed to the characterisation. Cudden described working with the cast as one of the "biggest privileges" of being part of the job and praised them for being "fabulous and so supportive with any questions".

To prepare for the role of Becky, an undercover police officer, Cudden listened to some podcasts for research. Cudden has said that she loves filming in the street set of the soap. She also added that she loves to do stunts. Following Cudden's debut, viewers of the soap speculated that she would remain on Coronation Street for months to come, as they believed that they spotted her jacket in a picture of Cudden's co-star Channique Sterling-Brown. The following month, Becky was confirmed by the soap's producer, Kate Brooks, to be a villain that would try to cause trouble for Lisa's relationship with Carla Connor (Alison King). In December 2025, it was announced that Cudden would also play Becky in Corriedale, a crossover episode between Coronation Street and Emmerdale. The one-off episode will air on 5 January 2026. At the screening for the episode, Cudden explained that she featured heavily in the special and that she reached "peak villain". Cudden's last appearance as Becky occurred in the episode originally airing on 12 January 2026.

Cudden has also appeared in adaptations of the plays Plasticine (at the Southwark Playhouse), Messiah, Everyman, Macbeth, Much Ado About Nothing, Pillars Of The Community, The Tempest, The Rover and Woyzeck, in addition to the television shows The Bill and Crimson Knights and the short films Deep Sleep, Speed Dating, 4.48 Psychosis and Gone Far Away. She also was a voice artist in the 2025 audiobook Harry Potter and the Philosopher's Stone (Full-Cast Edition). In addition to acting, Cudden has taught and directed at the London Academy of Music and Dramatic Art and has held the "Joint Head of Screen, Audio and Innovation" position there. She has also directed stage adaptations of Tartuffe, Pentecost and The Rover, as well as the 2026 short film After Birth.

== Personal life ==
Cudden has a husband, and a son born in 2014 or 2015. Three weeks after she married her husband, Cudden had to go away for an acting job, which she found difficult. She has said that she enjoys touring and discovering new places but not being away from her husband. She has described herself as "lucky, bookish, snoozy" and "incredibly cosy"; she has joked that she would be a bear if she could. She enjoys writing, spending time with her family and going for walks with her dog in the woods, and is a fan of science fiction. Cudden's dream role would be Ellen Ripley in Alien.

== Acting credit ==
=== Filmography ===
| Year | Title | Role | Notes | Ref(s). |
|---|---|---|---|---|
| Unknown | Crimson Knights | Corin | —N/a | |
| Unknown | Speed Dating | Sandra | Short film | |
| Unknown | Casualty | DS Pierce | —N/a | |
| Unknown | 4.48 Psychosis | She | Short film | |
| Unknown | Gone Far Away | Emily | Short film | |
| 2008–09 | Casualty | Molly | 3 episodes (series 23) | |
| 2009 | Deep Sleep | Fiona | Short film | |
| 2009 | The Bill | Susie Hughes | Guest role (2 episodes) | |
| 2011 | Doctor Who | Anita | 1 episode ("Let's Kill Hitler") | |
| 2011 | Vera | Grace Bishop | 1 episode ("The Crow Trap") | |
| 2011 | PhoneShop | Stalker | 1 episode ("It's Training Men") | |
| 2015 | Doctors | Sylvia Carriere | 1 episode ("Surrogate Dad") | |
| 2016 | Holby City | Michelle Lavers | 1 episode ("The Hope That Kills") | |
| 2017 | Theatre on 4: Occupational Hazards | JD | Broadcast on BBC Radio 4 | |
| 2021 | The Girlfriend Experience | Sensor Tech | 1 episode ("State of Mind") | |
| 2022 | The Midwich Cuckoos | Sarah McLean | Recurring role | |
| 2022, 2025 | Am I Being Unreasonable? | Liz | Guest role (2 episodes) | |
| 2023 | Father Brown | Agnes Morris | 1 episode ("The Wheels of Wrath") | |
| 2023 | Doctors | Lisa Caldwell | 1 episode ("Finding Jacob") | |
| 2024 | Mr Bates vs The Post Office | Issy Hogg | 1 episode ("Episode 1") | |
| 2024 | Masters of the Air | Marjorie | 1 episode ("Part One") | |
| 2025 | Am I Being Unreasonable? | Daniel Radcliffe's mum | Guest role (1 episode) | |
| 2025 | Steve | Claire | Drama film | |
| 2025–26 | Coronation Street | Becky Swain | Regular role | |
| 2026 | Corriedale | Becky Swain | One-off special episode | |

=== Theatre ===
| Year | Production | Role | Venue | Ref. |
|---|---|---|---|---|
| Unknown | The Resistible Rise of Arturo Ui | —N/a | Maddermarket Tour | |
| Unknown | The Metamorphosis | Greta | Maddermarket Tour | |
| Unknown | The Rover | Moretta/Valeria | —N/a | |
| Unknown | Macbeth/Much Ado About Nothing/The Tempest | Various | —N/a | |
| Unknown | A Midsummer Night's Dream | —N/a | Blenheim Palace | |
| Unknown | Messiah | Mary/Mary Magdalene/Disciple | Born Again Theatre | |
| Unknown | Everyman | God | Bretton Hall | |
| Unknown | The Lion, the Witch and the Wardrobe | Chicken | —N/a | |
| Unknown | Pillars Of The Community | Lona | Oxford School of Drama | |
| Unknown | Plasticine | Natasha | Southwark Playhouse | |
| Unknown | Woyzeck | Marie/Journeyman 2 | Royal Academy of Dramatic Art | |
| 2012 | Shallow Slumber | Dawn | Soho Theatre | |
| 2012 | The Village Bike | Becky | Crucible Theatre | |
| 2014 | Tonight at 8.30 | Ensemble cast | Several locations | |
| 2016 | After Miss Julie | Christine | Various | |
| 2017 | Occupational Hazards | JD | Hampstead Theatre | |
| 2018 | The Last Days of Anne Boleyn | Anne Boleyn | Tower of London | |
| 2019 | One Man, Two Guvnors | Rachel Crabbe | The Theatre Royal Haymarket | |

== Directing credits ==
- Tartuffe
- Pentecost
- The Rover
- After Birth
