= Touched (play) =

Touched is a play by English playwright Stephen Lowe.

The play opened at the Nottingham Playhouse on 9 June 1977, directed by Richard Eyre. It was revived at the Royal Court in January 1981, in a new production by William Gaskill. Both productions starred Marjorie Yates as Sandra. The play was joint winner of the George Devine Award in 1977.

In February 2006, it was one of the fifty plays chosen by the Royal Court to represent the fifty-year history of the English Stage Company with readings in the Theatre Upstairs - Look Back: 50 readings, 50 writers, 50 plays. The rehearsed reading of Touched took place on 22 February 2006, with Anne-Marie Duff as Sandra. Nick Hern Books published a new edition of the play to coincide with this production, with a new afterword by Lowe.

The play has been revived many times by regional theatres in England, including Derby Playhouse and Salisbury Playhouse, and colleges, including RADA and Canterbury College in February 2011. In February 2017, Nottingham Playhouse celebrated the fortieth anniversary of the play with a new production starring Vicky McClure as Sandra. Five of the cast were graduates of the Central Junior Television Workshop in Nottingham: Vicky McClure, Aisling Loftus, Chloe Harris, Luke Gell and George Boden.

== Plot and themes ==
The play is set in 1945 during the hundred days between VE Day in May 1945 and VJ Day in August 1945, a period which also included the election of the first ever Labour government and the dropping of the atomic bomb on Hiroshima and Nagasaki. The play focuses on a group of women in a working-class suburb of Nottingham, especially Sandra and her sisters, Joan and Betty. Sandra has lost a child: not killed by an enemy bomb, but by a car in the blackout. Now, with peace coming, she is full of hope for a different kind of future. She says, "The world's changing. It's not going to go back to the way it was."

Lowe was inspired to write the play by his mother: "I grew up on the usual pulp of heroic war films and comics... While therefore I gained a fairly graphic picture of the life of a soldier, it occurred to me while talking to my mother that I had hardly any picture of those who stayed at home - those whose battles had been fought in the landscape I had grown up in. I knew nothing, really, about the sacrifices and suffering of the women who only a few years later were to pick me up and put me down, and place pennies in my hand. Pennies I had never thought to return."

As critic Lyn Gardner says, the play reflects “both the social mores of the time and the inner emotional lives of these down-to-earth women. It understands their tribal loyalties and their stern sense of working-class morality, forbidding fraternisation with the Italian POWs that might put one of their number beyond the pale.” Time Out said of the play, "Touched is truly identified with working people and a radical vision, unlike many contemporary plays for which the same claim is made."

== Sources ==
- Touched by Stephen Lowe, Methuen 1981 ISBN 0-413-48510-2
- Touched by Stephen Lowe, Nick Hern Books 2006 ISBN 1-85459-925-9
- www.stephenlowe.co.uk
