= Meeting Ground Theatre Company =

Theatre company in Nottingham, United Kingdom

Meeting Ground Theatre Company is an experimental theatre company, based in Nottingham, United Kingdom. The company originates much of its work in Nottingham and tours many of its plays in the East Midlands, but it has also engaged in a number of international collaborations, and a number of its productions have appeared at the Magdalena International Women's Theatre Festival.

In 2014 The company's artistic directors are playwright Stephen Lowe, Tanya Myers and Tom Wright.

== History ==
The company was founded in 1985 by Lowe, Myers, Bush Hartshorn, Jo Buffery and Stephen Mapp, after Lowe and Myers moved to Nottingham from London.

In the 1990s two productions were directed by Polish director Zofia Kalinska, one of which, Plaisirs d'Amour, she directed in parallel with a Polish-language production of the same piece for Akne Theatre. In 2002 the company ran a workshop in Romania, bringing together theatre artists from Algeria, Palestine, Romania and Serbia.

Productions have varied in performance style and form, from puppetry to video, from playwright-led play to street theatre and performance art; and ranged in subject and theme from the First World War to gender roles and female sexuality, from people smuggling to the Luddites.

Participating actors have included George Costigan, Neil Dudgeon, Tamzin Griffin, and Maurice Roëves (UK); Zbigniew Yann Rola (Poland), Ulrike Johannson and Astrid Kuhl (Germany).

The company has co-produced, or worked in association with the Liverpool Playhouse, Akne Theatre, Central Television, Nottingham Playhouse, AZ Theatre and the Young Vic. They have received funding from the Arts Council, East Midlands Arts, Nottingham City Council, Central Television, North West Arts, The Gulbenkian Foundation, the British Council, LOT Airlines, the Institute of Mental Health Nottingham, the National Institute for Health Research SDO and CLAHRC-NDL.

== Productions ==
- Strive, written and directed by Lowe; UK tour (1985)
- Desire, written and directed by Lowe; UK tour (1986)
- Pushing On, large scale street choreography devised by Myers and Tamzin Griffin; Nottingham (1986)
- Fat Cats and Hot Dogs, community promenade play, produced by Bush Hartshorn and Jo Buffery; Newark (1986?)
- Demon Lovers, written and directed by Lowe; UK tour (1987). This play depicted a society which devalued creativity, leading to individuals with a poisoned fascistic imagination. It also drew upon ideas about multiple personality from Robert Ornstein's book Multimind. A secretary and her new boss start an affair, which turns into a destructive folie à deux and ends with the murder of a child. Film and video were an integral part of the production, showing the characters' multiple personalities as well as the coded "home movie" made by the murderers.
- City of Women TV documentary; Central Television (1987)
- Dance for the Girls, devised and performed by Myers and Tamzin Griffin; Magdalena Festival, and regional tour (1988/9)
- Paradise, a musical by Lowe and David Wilson (composer), directed by Pip Broughton; co-production with Nottingham Playhouse (1990)
- Sale of the Demonic Women, adapted and directed by Zofia Kalinska, from writings by Stanislaw Witkiewicz; Nottingham and London (1990), Berlin and Kraków (1991). Kalinska, previously a colleague of Grotowski and an actor with Tadeusz Kantor, first met Myers at a Magdalena Festival. Kalinska's production explored archetypes and stereotypes of strong women using parody, gothic design by Polish designer Zofia de Ines, ecstatic trance states and direct speech. As reviewer Betty Caplan said, the actors played "with their characters, stepping in and out of role, rather than simply reinforcing stereotypes." The production brought together actors from England, Germany and Poland, and toured in the UK, Germany, Poland and Italy.
- Plaisirs d'Amour, adapted and directed by Kalinska, from a play by Ronald Duncan; co-production with Polish company Akne Theatre (1992)
- Florence, by Myers; Magdalena Festival(1993)
- Falling Angels, by Myers (1994)
- Transplant, by Jeremy Seabrook and Michael O'Neill; co-production with AZ Theatre, directed by Jonathan Chadwick; London (2001)
- Shoes, directed by Tom Wright; Nottingham (2003)
- Small Waves was written by Myers, directed by Tom Wright; Nottingham and Vancouver (2006). Three strangers meet in an isolated house in winter: a woman, an 11-year-old girl and an old lady. Myers and her daughter Martha Myers-Lowe played the woman and the girl, and animated a puppet representing the old lady. Nottingham post critic Jeremy Lewis said the play "suggests faith, hope and courage offer an escape from the torments of modern life".
- The Container, by Clare Bayley, directed by Tom Wright; in association with Young Vic, London (2009)
- Inside Out of Mind by Tanya Myers, workshop presentation; Nottingham Playhouse (2011)

== Projects ==
- The Luddite Project, workshops and various performances, Nottingham (1987–90)
- War Stories, workshops in London (Tricycle and Royal Court), Sibiu, Romania (1999-2002). This ongoing project was later led by AZ Theatre. International companies were invited to work with Meeting Ground. Organised in 2002 by Meeting Ground artistic director Jonathan Chadwick and Iraqi documentary film director Maysoon Patachi, the first workshop took place in Sibiu, Romania, with theatre artists from England, Serbia, Algeria and Gaza. Among the pieces developed from this project are Life on the Borderline by Hoshiar, presented by AZ Theatre in 2007; and Stephen Lowe's play Smile, produced at Lakeside Theatre in 2008. Jonathan Chadwick's company AZ Theatre continues this project.
- Inside Out of Mind was written by Myers, in partnership with the Institute of Mental Health, Nottingham (2010–12) The 2012 piece brings together ethnographic researchers with theatre practitioners to examine the care of people with dementia. Myers, director Lowe and ethnographers Simon Bailey and Kezia Scales worked together on a workshop presentation of the play in July 2011. Meeting Ground later worked to create a full-scale production and tour of the play, in partnership with a Managed Innovation Network of the Institute of Mental Health, Nottingham.

== Publications ==
- Lowe, Stephen, introduction to Smile, theatre programme, Lakeside Arts Centre, Nottingham, 2008.
- Lowe, Stephen, The Builder of Bridges, essay published on www.stephenlowe.co.uk, 2002.
- Meeting Ground, Pushing On, company leaflet; Nottingham, 1986.
- Meeting Ground, Demon Lovers, company leaflet; Nottingham, 1987.
- Meeting Ground, The Politics of the Imagination, company leaflet; 1993.
