= Light Shining in Buckinghamshire =

1976 play by Caryl Churchill

- Written by: Caryl Churchill
- Original language: English
- Setting: 1647 England

Premiere
- Date premiered: September 1976
- Place premiered: Traverse Theatre, Edinburgh

Light Shining in Buckinghamshire is a play by British playwright Caryl Churchill written in 1976.

The play is set during the English Civil War and part of it dramatises the Putney Debates. Characters include Diggers, Levellers and Ranters. Their idealism is contrasted with the pragmatism of Oliver Cromwell and Henry Ireton.

The play was Churchill's first collaboration with the Joint Stock Theatre Company. The title is taken from a Digger pamphlet More Light Shining in Buckinghamshire. In 2008, Mark Ravenhill wrote in The Guardian, "Written for the leftwing company Joint Stock, the play charts the disintegration of radical political possibilities during the English civil war, skilfully balancing individual and communal experiences. It is a play that is rich in language: prayer, debate, ecstatic meetings, the stumbling attempts of the newly empowered to find a voice."

== Productions ==
Light Shining in Buckinghamshire opened at the Traverse Theatre, Edinburgh, running between 7 September 1976 and 11 September 1976. It was produced by the Joint Stock Theatre Group with direction by Max Stafford-Clark. Churchill specified that parts should swapped and the same character be played by different actors.

It was revived at London's National Theatre in 2015. Direction was by Lyndsey Turner, with the cast that featured Leo Bill, Daniel Flynn and a "50-plus cast, standing shoulder to shoulder, is a powerful thing, especially when singing Helen Chadwick's choral arrangements in heartfelt harmony."

It had its US premiere Off-Broadway at the Perry Street Theater in February 1991, directed by Lisa Peterson.

The play was revived Off-Broadway at the New York Theatre Workshop on May 7, 2018. Directed by Rachel Chavkin, the cast featured Vinie Burrows, Rob Campbell, Matthew Jeffers, Mikéah Ernest Jennings, Gregg Mozgala and Evelyn Spahr.

== Reception ==
In 2015, Liz Schafer of Times Higher Education discussed the play's relevance to modern politics, arguing that the "insistence [of the corn merchant Star] that the Diggers must be removed so that poor people can be fed – large fields of corn are the way forward, not squatters farming common land – reads starkly nearly 40 years on from the play’s first performance. Star is not only capitulating to capitalism and promoting enclosure by a different name, he is also setting the path towards agribusiness’ wrecking of the planet." Schafer also stated, "The debaters speak with passion, conviction, and they certainly don’t do soundbites". Kate Kellaway rated the 2015 National Theatre revival four out of five stars. Dominic Cavendish awarded it four out of five stars in The Daily Telegraph and quipped that "the fevered spirit of the times [...] is infectiously relayed".

In The Village Voice, Milton Felton-Dansky stated that while "Light Shining could have been merely a tale of misery [...] this play isn’t about wallowing in gloom". The critic wrote that the scene depicting the Putney Debates is "exhausting, but the stakes are huge, a reminder that big change so often comes through painstaking deliberation, not shock and awe." Moira Buffini of The Guardian argued that "Light Shining is such a good play about the British, about democracy; a play about being on the losing side, about disillusionment; a play in which time passes, regimes change and ideals crumble into experience. A play in which hope comes in the form of human kindness. I left it inspired. Like all her work, it left me asking the question: 'Who are we?'"

After the 2018 New York Theater Workshop performance, Sara Holdren of The New York Times derided Light Shining in Buckinghamshire as "indulgent and leaden. However wonderful it may be to perform, it’s a hard slog to sit through." Describing the anticlimax as "true of history but taxing as dramaturgy", Green wrote that the audience simply sees "an endless cycle of betrayal and hardship." Green also said that the play's bleak vision is sometimes beautifully crystallized when coming from characters' interactions, but that the historical arguments often "aren't dramatized so much as transcribed".

Sara Holdren wrote in Vulture that "Light Shining certainly contains striking moments and several strong performances [...] but something isn’t quite firing here." The play's 21 scenes, according to the critic, do not form a narrative but "provide a patchwork of characters and encounters [...] Chavkin and her actors have to struggle to get each new vignette started, like they’re hefting a great weight each time, then dropping it, then bending over to pick it up again." Holdren praised the mirror scene between Burrows and Spahr for strongly conveying the "physical concreteness of the revolutionary urge: the marvel of seeing oneself as whole and human for the first time. For me, this kind of sudden spinal tap into the startled, hopeful humanity of a pair of characters is infinitely more powerful than some of the production’s more confrontational scenes." However, Holdren wrote that the work feels very "sleepy".
