= Stephen Lowe (playwright) =

English playwright and director

- Born: December 1947 (age 78); Sneinton, Nottingham, England
- Occupations: Playwright, director

Stephen Lowe (born December 1947) is an English playwright and director.

Lowe's plays have dealt with subjects ranging from the takeover of Tibet by the Chinese People's Liberation Army in 1959 (Tibetan Inroads) to a dying DH Lawrence trying find a publisher for Lady Chatterley (Empty Bed Blues); from Donald McGill postcards (Cards and Kisses on the Bottom) to Dr John Dee (The Alchemical Wedding). His best known plays are Touched, about a group of working-class women in Nottingham at the end of the Second World War; The Ragged Trousered Philanthropists, about a group of house-painters in 1906 (adapted from the novel by Robert Tressell); and Old Big ‘Ead in the Spirit of the Man, in which football hero Brian Clough comes back from the dead to inspire a playwright working on his latest play.

Many of his plays were first produced in his home city, Nottingham, and a number have been inspired by its history.

== Early life ==
Lowe was born Stephen James Wright in Sneinton, Nottingham, where his father was a labourer and his mother was a machinist in Nottingham's Lace Market. He graduated from Birmingham University in English and Theatre Studies.

After university, Lowe worked in various jobs while writing, including part-time lecturer, clerk, hospital receptionist, newspaper distributor, advertising manager, housepainter, barman and civil servant. While working as a part-time shepherd in the Yorkshire Dales, he was commissioned by Alan Ayckbourn to write a comedy double-bill, Comic Pictures, and joined his Scarborough Theatre in the Round company as an actor and writer. Ayckbourn produced Comic Pictures in 1976.

Lowe took his mother's maiden name as a professional identity in 1976, when he joined Ayckbourn's company.

== Career ==
Lowe has had plays produced by the Royal Court, Royal Shakespeare Company, Riverside Studios, Theatre Royal Stratford East, Hampstead Theatre, Joint Stock; and at regional theatres across the country including Scarborough Theatre in the Round, Sheffield Crucible, Liverpool Playhouse, Derby Playhouse, Birmingham Rep, Salisbury Playhouse and Plymouth Theatre Royal. A two-man adaptation by Townsend Productions of his play The Ragged Trousered Philanthropists toured throughout the country in 2011 to 2013 and again in 2015.

Lowe has worked with many leading directors including Bill Alexander, Alan Ayckbourn, Annie Castledine, Jonathan Chadwick, Anthony Clark, Stephen Daldry, Alan Dossor, Richard Eyre, Bill Gaskill, David Leveaux, and Danny Boyle, who early in his career was assistant director on Lowe’s play Tibetan Inroads. His theatre and television work has featured actors such as Bruce Alexander, Warren Clarke, George Costigan, Kenneth Cranham, Sharon Duce, Emma Fielding, Brian Glover, Nigel Hawthorne, Bill Paterson, Neil Pearson, Kathryn Pogson, Linus Roache, Michael Socha, Colin Tarrant, Marjorie Yates, Harriet Walter and Rachel Weisz.

Lowe was writer in residence at Riverside Studios from 1982 to 1984, and he has led numerous theatre and writing workshops, including at the National Theatre, the Royal Shakespeare Company, BBC Television, the Arvon Foundation, Liverpool Playhouse, Nottingham Playhouse and Riverside Studios. He has lectured at Dartington College of Arts, Birmingham University (on the MA in Playwriting Studies programme), Nottingham Trent University, Charles University in Prague and at the Performance Art Academy in Sofia. Lowe has been a member of various theatre boards and advisory panels, including Great Eastern Stage Company. He was on the council of Arts Council England, and was Chair of Arts Council England - East Midlands from 2004 to 2010.

Lowe's play Touched was joint winner of the George Devine Award in 1977, and he was awarded an honorary doctorate by the University of Nottingham in July 2011. In July 2015, Nottingham Express Transit named one of their new trams "Stephen Lowe" in his honour.

== A Nottingham playwright ==
Many of his plays were first produced in his home-town at Nottingham Playhouse, at Lakeside Arts Centre or by Lowe’s own company, Meeting Ground Theatre Company. Lowe moved back to Nottingham in 1985 to start Meeting Ground, with a group including his wife Tanya Myers.

=== Family history ===
A number of his plays were inspired by his family history and his own life in Nottingham:

Stars, is set in a dingy Nottingham cinema in 1944. This was Lowe's second play, directed by Alan Ayckbourn in Scarborough in 1976. Like his later play, Glamour, this was inspired by Lowe’s experience as a young man working at the Moulin Rouge cinema in Nottingham.

Touched follows the fortunes of a group of women in a working-class suburb of Nottingham in 1945 over the hundred days between VE Day and victory in Japan. First staged at Nottingham Playhouse in 1977, directed by Richard Eyre, the play was drawn from stories of his mother, his aunts and other Nottingham women. To celebrate the play’s fortieth anniversary in 2017, Nottingham Playhouse staged a revival in 2017, starring Vicky McClure

Moving Pictures is an autobiographical comedy about two working-class families in 1960s Nottingham. It was partly drawn from Lowe's experience of his father returning from war, difficult, angry and in poor health. In the play, a boy (Jimmy) watches his mother sacrifice herself to a man intellectually and morally her inferior. Later, Jimmy, inspired by D.H. Lawrence’s Women in Love, wants to “break through” the conventions of respectability to a true relationship with his best mate and with his girlfriend. The play was first produced as Glasshouses at The Royal Court in 1981 directed by Annie Castledine, and later revived under its new title Moving Pictures at Leeds Playhouse.

Seachange, produced at Riverside Studios in 1984 directed by David Leveaux, was inspired partly by memories of Lowe’s grandfather, who was drowned in a Red Cross ship when it was sunk off the coast at Gallipoli, and partly by the recent 1982 Falklands War. According to a review in Tribune, the most beautiful thing about the play is its lyrical language and the play "is set, appropriately, at sea.”

Glamour is set at a seedy cinema, the Moulin Rouge, in 1960s Nottingham. The play tells the story of a young man who works at the cinema, and who has made his first film, Blue Movie. On the day of its screening, Ronnie and Reggie Kray are in town – in fact the notorious gangsters really did visit Nottingham in 1966. In an interview about the play, Lowe said he was inspired “…by me being caught up on the edge of this... The Krays don't appear on stage but they're lurking in the shadows." Directed by Bill Alexander at Nottingham Playhouse in 2009, the production featured Michael Socha in his first stage role.

=== Inspired by the city ===
Other plays were inspired by notable people from the history and mythology of Nottingham:

Sally Ann Hallelujah Band was produced at Nottingham Playhouse Theatre Roundabout. The play is a burlesque history of the early days of the Salvation Army, which was founded by William Booth. Booth was born, like Lowe, in Sneinton in Nottingham.

Desire was produced by Lowe’s own company, Meeting Ground Theatre in 1981. Set in Nottingham in 1919, the play features the ghost of Albert Ball, the Nottingham-born flying ace credited with 44 victories in World War I. But in his last letter to his father before he died, Ball wrote, "I.. am really beginning to feel like a murderer."

Paradise, is a dramatic musical set in 1812 in Nottinghamshire, produced at Nottingham Playhouse in 1990, with music by David Wilson. The play is about the battle of the Luddites against the brutal imposition of machinery at the birth of the industrial revolution. Ned Ludd was the legendary leader of the Luddites, and his story was first reported in an article in The Nottingham Review 1811. The play also featured Lord Byron, and a scientist trying hto cure a battle-fatigued soldier back from the Napoleonic wars. The Sunday Times critic, John Peter, said of the ambition of the play, “There are worse things to die of; and I'd rather have this than some of the over-rehearsed and over-hyped bilge that flits through the West End from time to time.”

Old Big ‘Ead in the Spirit of the Man was commissioned by the Nottingham Playhouse shortly after the death of Brian Clough in 2004. A local hero, Clough was manager of Nottingham Forest F.C. and famously led the club,“not necessarily the greatest players in the world”, to win the European Cup two years in a row. In an interview, Lowe said of Clough, “To me he was the true working-class hero, a man who hated authority, passionately loved his art form and took no crap from anyone… he also had immense talent and was one of the funniest men ever after Les Dawson...” In Lowe’s play, Clough, is called back from heaven to earth – possibly by mistake – to inspire a playwright who is having a mid-life crisis, lost in Sherwood Forest beside the Major Oak. The playwright (Jimmy) has no idea what to write for his next play and has just found his wife in a bed with another man. Clough inspires Jimmy to write about Robin Hood, who according to legend sometimes hid in the Major Oak, and Clough says, “gathered together a whole bunch of waifs and strays… them that nobody wanted, like my Forest team of ’78, and… turned them into the merriest bloody band in the land. …And what made them merry? …Me. I mean, Robin Hood.” Often interrupted at the most awkward moments by Clough’s irrepressible spirit, Jimmy takes his play through rehearsals to its first night. At the finale of Lowe’s fantastical comedy, Jimmy says "I need a big finish" and Clough obliges by hovering above Forest’s stadium and singing My Way. The first production in 2005, directed by Alan Dossor who conceived the play with Lowe, starred Colin Tarrant and was a huge hit, with 60% of the audience coming to the Playhouse for the first time. In her Observer review, Susannah Clapp’s said, “This is that rare thing, an original piece of local theatre, an antidote to the cloning of Britain’s cities.

== Peace plays ==
In the 1980s, Lowe edited two anthologies of peace plays for Methuen. The first volume was of plays by British playwrights, including Deborah Levy, Adrian Mitchell, and Lowe himself (Keeping Body and Soul Together). It was published in 1985 during a period of increased tension towards the end of the Cold War, and Lowe's introduction quoted from Gabriel Garcia Marquez's Nobel acceptance speech, "we, the inventors of tales, who will believe anything, feel entitled to believe that it is not yet too late to engage in the creation of a utopia of a very different kind." The second volume, published in 1990, came out of the new era of glasnost and a thaw in relations between the two superpowers. For this volume Lowe selected plays by two American playwrights, Arthur Kopit and Richard Stayton; and by two Russian playwrights, Fyodor Burlatsky, a former adviser to Khrushchev and Gorbachev, and Mikhail Bulgakov.

== Works ==
=== Plays ===
- Cards, Act Inn Theatre, London (1973)
- Comic Pictures (Stars and Cards), Scarborough Theatre-in-the-Round (1976)
- Shooting Fishing and Riding, Scarborough Theatre-in-the-Round (1977)
- Touched, Nottingham Playhouse (1977); Royal Court (1981)
- Sally Ann Hallelujah Band, Nottingham Playhouse Theatre Roundabout (1978)
- The Ragged Trousered Philanthropists, Joint Stock (1978)
- Glasshouses, Royal Court Theatre Upstairs (1981); (later retitled:) Moving Pictures, Leeds Playhouse
- Tibetan Inroads, Royal Court (1981)
- The Trial of Frankenstein, Plymouth Theatre Royal (1982)
- Strive, Sheffield Crucible Studio (1983)
- Seachange, Riverside Studios (1984)
- Keeping Body and Soul Together, Royal Court Theatre Upstairs (1984)
- The Storm (adaptation, from Ostrovsky), RSC Barbican The Pit (1985)
- Desire, Meeting Ground Theatre national tour (1986)
- Demon Lovers, Meeting Ground Theatre national tour (1987)
- William Tell (adaptation, from Schiller), Sheffield Crucible (1987)
- Divine Gossip, RSC Barbican The Pit (1988)
- Paradise, Nottingham Playhouse (1990)
- The Alchemical Wedding, Salisbury Playhouse (1998)
- Revelations, Hampstead Theatre (2003)
- It's Not Personal, Nottingham Playhouse (2004)
- Old Big 'Ead in The Spirit of the Man, Nottingham Playhouse and national tour (2005-6)
- The Fox and the Little Vixen, Tangere Arts tour (2005)
- The Devil's League, in rehearsal at Derby Playhouse when theatre went into receivership; not yet produced (2008)
- Smile, Lakeside Arts Nottingham (2008)
- Glamour, Nottingham Playhouse (2009)
- Empty Bed Blues, Lakeside Arts Nottingham (2009)
- Seance on a Sunday Afternoon, Lakeside Arts Nottingham (2011)
- Just a Gigolo, Edinburgh Festival and Lakeside Arts Nottingham (2012)
- Altitude Sickness, rehearsed reading, Lakeside Arts Nottingham (2016)

=== Screenplays ===
- Cries From A Watchtower, BBC TV Play for Today (1979) Producer Richard Eyre. - A small-time watchmaker is hit by the new silicon chip technology.
- Fred Karno's Bloody Circus, rehearsed reading by the Royal Shakespeare Company, Warehouse Theatre (1979); part of Plays that Television Would Not Do series.
- Shades, BBC 2 60 minutes as part of PLAYS FOR TOMORROW series (1981). - The youth of 2001 re-connect with 80's Peace Protestors. Starring Neil Pearson.
- Unstable Elements, Film NewsReel/ Channel 4. (1983)
- Kisses on the Bottom, BBC 2 (1984). - A comedy in which the characters of Donald McGill sea-side postcards come alive (adapted from Lowe's play Cards).
- Tell Tale Hearts, Three part thriller BBC Scotland (1990) Starring Emma Fielding, Bill Paterson. Directed by Thaddeus O'Sullivan. - Investigations of a serial child murderer expose hidden fears in all involved.
- Ice Dance, BBC 1 (1990). Director Alan Dossor. Starring Warren Clarke. Producer Mike Wearing. - Two young Nottingham kids try to emulate Torvill and Dean.
- Flea Bites, BBC 1 (1992). Director Alan Dossor. starring Nigel Hawthorne. Producer Mike Wearing. - A Survivor of the camps teaches a young boy the mystery of a flea-circus.
- Scarlet & Black, BBC classical Four hour adaptation (1993). Director Ben Bolt. Starring Ewan McGregor and Rachel Weisz. Producer Mike Wearing. - Stendhal's masterpiece of young love & passion
- Greenstone, ABC/ NZ TV. Eight-hour historical drama with Communicado, the New Zealand producers of Once Were Warriors. (1999). - The 'adventure' story of the first white settlers and the subsequent colonisation of the land.

=== TV Series/Serials ===
- Albion Market, Granada TV. (1985-6), 10 episodes.
- Families, Granada TV. Devised by Kay Mellor. (1989–93), 40 episodes.
- In Suspicious Circumstances, Granada TV. (1992), 2 episodes.
- Revelations, Granada TV. (1995), 5 episodes.
- Castles, BBC 1. (1996), 4 episodes.
- Dalziel and Pascoe, BBC 1. (1997), 2 episodes.
- Coronation Street, Granada TV. (1988-9, 1994-8, 2003-4), over 70 episodes.

=== Directing ===
- Shooting Fishing and Riding, Scarborough Theatre-in-the-Round (1977)
- Strive, Meeting Ground Theatre national tour (1985)
- Desire, Meeting Ground Theatre national tour (1986)
- Demon Lovers, Meeting Ground Theatre national tour (1987)
- Inside Out of Mind by Tanya Myers, Meeting Ground Theatre workshop presentation for Nottingham Institute of Mental Health (2011)

== Sources ==
- Donohue, Walter (edited), The Warehouse: A Writer's Theatre. Theatre Papers no. 8, Dartington College of Arts, 1980.
- Faith, hope, and human decency, interview with Lowe by John Cunningham; The Guardian, 19 Jan 1981; p9.
- Moving Pictures, Four Plays by Stephen Lowe. London, Methuen, 1985.
- Divine Gossip & Tibetan Inroads, by Stephen Lowe. London, Methuen, 1988.
- Lowe, Stephen. Entry by Dan Rebellato, in Companion to 20th Century Theatre, edited by Colin Chambers. Continuum International, 2002; p 457.
- Old Big 'Ead in The Spirit of the Man, by Stephen Lowe. London, Methuen, 2005.
- Interview with Stephen Lowe, by Nathan Miller. Left Lion, 1 June 2006.
- Touched, by Stephen Lowe. Corrected edition. London, Nick Hern Books, 2006.
- Lowe, Stephen, Who's Who 2011, A & C Black, 2011; online edn, Oxford University Press, Dec 2010; online edn, Oct 2010.
- New play focuses on role of carers, article from Nottingham Evening Post website, 27 Jul 2011.
- Work CV, Stephen Lowe website
- Stephen Lowe at Seventy: a Tribute, by John Baird. Nottingham City of Literature blog, 2017
