= Indica Watson =

English actress (born 2010)

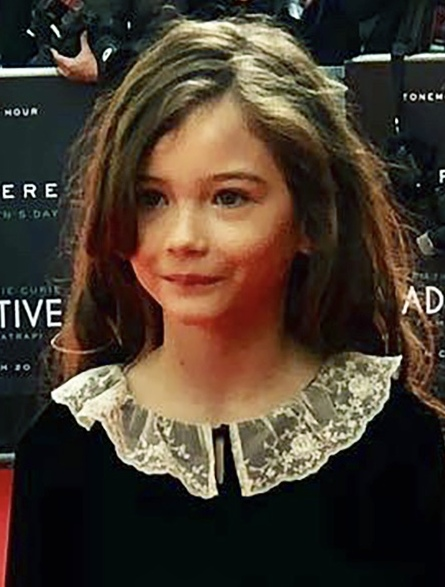
- Watson attending the London Premiere of Radioactive in 2020
- Born: Indica Elizabeth Watson; 20 January 2010 (age 16); London, England
- Occupation: Actress

Indica Elizabeth Watson (born 20 January 2010) is an English actress. She is best known for her work in television series Who Is Erin Carter?, The Midwich Cuckoos, Sherlock and The Missing, as well as feature films A Boy Called Christmas, Radioactive and The Electrical Life of Louis Wain.

== Career ==
Watson's first acting appearance was in a short film in London when she was 5 years old. The six-minute film Who Are You? was commissioned by Somerset House. After this she auditioned for the second series of television drama The Missing and was cast in the role of Lucy. The series was first screened in the UK in October 2016 and was a critical success.

Her next role was in the crime drama Sherlock with Benedict Cumberbatch and Martin Freeman. She played the young Eurus Holmes (as "Little Eurus"), Sherlock's younger sister, winning praise for her performance from the Daily Express.

She spent three months filming the espionage thriller Deep State in Morocco and Southern England. The eight-part series was released in April 2018.

Watson's first performance in a leading role was in the BFI-funded psychological horror short film Martyrs Lane, written and directed by Ruth Platt. This was followed by her second leading role in the short independent film Nurtured. In April 2019 it was announced that Watson had been cast alongside Jim Broadbent, Sally Hawkins, Kristen Wiig, Toby Jones and Maggie Smith in A Boy Called Christmas, a feature film adaptation of the novel by Matt Haig about the origins of Father Christmas.

Filming began in August 2019 for The Electrical Life of Louis Wain in which Watson plays Young Felicie Wain.

In October 2019 she performed on stage with the punk group The Damned at the London Palladium for A Night of a Thousand Vampires. The concert was released as a film in October 2022.

In November 2019 she appeared as Charlotte Day in BBC drama miniseries Gold Digger with Julia Ormond and Ben Barnes.

Watson was cast in Marjane Satrapi's film Radioactive as the young Irene Curie; the film was originally due out in cinemas in spring 2020. Owing to the COVID-19 pandemic its release was delayed until the summer when it was released on Amazon Prime Video. Watson received praise for her role from the London Evening Standard.

In 2020 Watson narrated the audiobook Moojag and the Auticode Secret by N.E. McMorran.

Adapted for television by David Farr from John Wyndham's 1957 novel of the same name, The Midwich Cuckoos was released in June 2022. Watson played the character of Evie Stone, for which she was nominated for a Young Artist Award.

Watson spent six months living in Barcelona during 2022 while filming the Netflix series Who Is Erin Carter? with Evin Ahmad and Sean Teale. She played Erin Carter’s troubled daughter, Harper. Her performance drew praise from The Guardian who described Watson as "a preternaturally gifted actor". The series premiered on Netflix on 24 August 2023, going on to be the most watched Netflix show in the world the following week.

== Filmography ==
=== Film ===
Year	Title	Role	Notes
2019	Martyrs Lane	Leah	Short film, Lead role
2019	Nurtured	Alex	Short film, Lead role
2020	Radioactive	Young Irene Curie	Feature film
2021	A Boy Called Christmas	Little Noosh	Feature film
2021	The Electrical Life of Louis Wain	Young Felicie Wain	Feature film
2022	The Laureate	Catherine Nicholson	Feature film
2022	The Damned: A Night of a Thousand Vampires	Claudia	Live concert film

=== Television ===
Year	Title	Role	Notes
2016	The Missing	Lucy	Series 2, 4 episodes
2017	Sherlock	Little Eurus Holmes	Series 4, episode 3: The Final Problem
2018	Waffle the Wonder Dog	Poppy Essam	Series 1, episode 9: Waffle and the Good Dog
2018	True Horror	Meemi-Rose	Series episode 2: Ghost in the Wall
2018	Deep State	Lola Easton	Series 1, 8 episodes
2019	Grantchester	Jessica	Series 4, episode 5
2019	Gold Digger	Charlotte Day	5 episodes
2022	The Midwich Cuckoos	Evie Stone	episodes 6 & 7
2023	Who Is Erin Carter?	Harper Carter	6 episodes

=== Audiobooks ===
Year	Title	Role	Author
2020	Moojag and the Auticode Secret	Nema/Narrator	N.E. McMorran
