= The Midwich Cuckoos (TV series) =

British television drama

- Genre: Science fiction
- Created by: David Farr
- Based on: The Midwich Cuckoos by John Wyndham
- Starring: Keeley Hawes; Max Beesley; Aisling Loftus; Ukweli Roach; Lara Rossi; Synnøve Karlsen; Samuel West
- Composer: Hannah Peel
- Country of origin: United Kingdom
- Original language: English
- No. of series: 1
- No. of episodes: 7

Production
- Executive producers: Neil Blair; Robert Cheek; David Farr; Ruth Kenley-Letts; Marc Samuelson; Rick Senat; Alice Troughton
- Producer: Pat Karam
- Running time: 60 minutes
- Production companies: Snowed-In Productions; DayOut Productions; Route 24

Original release
- Network: Sky Max
- Release: 2 June 2022

The Midwich Cuckoos is a British science fiction television series created by David Farr and based on the 1957 book of the same name by John Wyndham. It stars Keeley Hawes and Max Beesley and premiered on 2 June 2022 on Sky Max.

== Synopsis ==
An unexplained blackout renders all inhabitants of the English village Midwich unconscious for 24 hours, referred to as the "dayout". Upon awakening it soon becomes apparent that all child-bearing aged women are now pregnant. The women all give birth on the same day to healthy babies which grow and develop much faster than "normal" children. The Children bear a resemblance to their mothers, but are both male and female. The government, led by Bernard Westcott, pays a subsidy to the Children's parents and both educates and monitors them from "The Grange" facility in the village. Dr Zellaby, a villager who was away on the dayout so did not fall pregnant, becomes a primary carer on the staff and suspects that the Children are of alien origin. She shares her concerns with DCI Haynes, the local Police liaison for the village.

Several years pass, and the quickly-developing Children become aloof and with the exception of one child - Nathan - have an emotional detachment from the other villagers, including their parents. The Children develop telekinetic abilities, which they use to get their own way, forcing their parents to act against their wills, self-harming and killing themselves in two cases. Bernard Westcott reveals himself to be an adult Child, the sole survivor from a Russian village 30 years ago that had a dayout, but was bombed by Russian authorities out of fear of the developing Children. Under Westcott's guidance the Children subvert a nearby military base and use the soldiers to organise safe passage out of the village. The Children use their mental powers to force all the villagers to forget the Children exist, but Nathan warns his parents, Zellaby and Haynes who take cover underground and are unaffected by the amnesia wave. The Children remove Nathan from their group mind, leaving him in the village and allowing him and Cassie to run away. They then depart on a bus guarded by the military, and with Zellaby as a willing hostage to ensure safe passage. Unknown to all, Haynes had taken the place of one of the soldiers and overnight hidden an explosive device on the bus. He tries to persuade Zellaby to leave, but she refuses knowing that if she does so the Children will become suspicious. Reluctantly he detonates the bomb killing all those on board - Zellaby and the Children, but Westcott in a support vehicle survives, looking on in horror. Nathan and Cassie watch the explosion from the woods before walking away.

== Cast and characters ==
=== Main ===
- Keeley Hawes as Dr. Susannah Zellaby
- Max Beesley as DCI Paul Haynes
- Aisling Loftus as Zoë Moran
- Ukweli Roach as Sam Clyde
- Lara Rossi as Jodie Blake
- Synnøve Karlsen as Cassie Stone
- Samuel West as Bernard Westcott

=== Recurring ===
- Rebekah Staton as Mary-Ann Phillips
- Mark Dexter as Stewart McLean
- Marianne Oldham as Jane Colter
- Jade Harrison as Deborah Haynes
- Amy Cudden as Sarah McLean
- Hannah Tointon as Rachel Saunders
- Lewis Reeves as Curtis Saunders
- Anneika Rose as Amrita Chohhan
- India Ria Amarteifio as Nora Randall
- Cherrelle Skeete as Bryony Cummings
- Darcie Smith and Amelie Bea Smith as Charlotte McLean
- Aditi Pothuganti and Jiyan Kaur Deol as Sunny Chohhan
- Indica Watson as Evie Stone
  - Billie Gadsdon as young Evie Stone
- Adiel Magaji as Nathan Blake
  - Jude Ible-Thompson as young Nathan Blake
- Erin Ainsworth and Natalia Harris as Lily-Grace Phillips
- Kaylen Luke as Ezra
- Scarlett Leigh and Georgia Thorne as Hannah Moran
- Jimmy Bone and Jude Muir as Joe Saunders
- Dexter Ansell as David Saunders
- Evan Scott and Marshall Hawkes as Connor Colter
- Alex Brockdorff as John Lancaster
- Kimara-Mai Petit and Kimia Lamour as Olive Randall

== Episodes ==
No.	Episode	Directed by	Written by	Original release date
1	Bad Things	Alice Troughton	David Farr	2 June 2022
2	In This Together	Alice Troughton	David Farr	2 June 2022
3	The Hive	Jennifer Perrott	David Farr and Sasha Hails	2 June 2022
4	Hide and Seek	Jennifer Perrott	David Farr and Laura Lomas	2 June 2022
5	Why Are You Lying?	Jennifer Perrott	David Farr and Namsi Khan	2 June 2022
6	Not An Ice Cream	Börkur Sigþórsson	David Farr	2 June 2022
7	Departure	Börkur Sigþórsson	David Farr	2 June 2022

== Broadcast ==
The series premiered on 2 June 2022 on Sky Max, with all episodes also available on Now. In Australia, the entire series was released on Stan.

== Reception ==
The series received mixed reviews. Lucy Mangan of The Guardian gave the first episode two out of five stars, feeling it did not make the most of its adaptational changes and topicality, with its emphasis on the perspective of female characters. Nick Hilton of The Independent also gave it two out of five stars, deeming it 'humourless' and criticizing the production. By contrast, Mark Kermode on Kermode and Mayo's Take praised the series' tone, use of horror and performances, saying it was a successful update of the novel. Carol Midgley of The Times also gave it four stars, praising the atmospheric direction and Farr's scripts.
On review aggregator Rotten Tomatoes, the series holds an approval rating of 71% based on 14 reviews. The website's critics consensus reads: "This adaptation of John Wyndham's classic novel is often cuckoo in an off-putting way and overstays its welcome with a bloated runtime, but it holds some diabolical delights for viewers who enjoy a science-fiction nightmare."

Hannah Peel's original soundtrack for The Midwich Cuckoos won the Ivor Novello Award for Best Television Soundtrack at The Ivors in London on 18 May 2023. On July 22 2023 Indica Watson was nominated for a Young Artist Award for her performance as Evie Stone.

== See also ==
- Village of the Damned (1960), a British adaptation of the novel
  - Village of the Damned (1995), an American remake, relocating the setting to California
- "Wild Barts Can't Be Broken", an episode of The Simpsons featuring The Bloodening, a Midwich Cuckoos parody
