= Joint Stock Theatre Company =

The Joint Stock Theatre Company was founded in London in 1974 by David Hare, Max Stafford-Clark Paul Kember and David Aukin. The director William Gaskill was also part of the company. It was primarily a company which presented new plays.

Joint Stock created a style of working with writers using company research to inspire workshops. From these workshops writers such as David Hare, Howard Brenton and Caryl Churchill would gather material to inspire a writing phase before rehearsals began. This methodology is sometimes referred to as The Joint Stock Method. Significant productions include Hare's Fanshen, Brenton's Epsom Downs, Stephen Lowe's Ragged Trousered Philanthropists and Churchill's Cloud Nine.

The company ceased to be active in 1989. In 1993 Max Stafford-Clark founded the touring company Out of Joint which shares some working practices with Joint Stock.

== Productions ==
Production	Writer	Venue	Year
The Speakers	adapted by the company from Heathcote Williams 'the speaker'	Birmingham Repertory Studio and tour	1974
Shivvers	by Stanley Eveling	Traverse Theatre and Theatre Upstairs	1974
X	by Barry Reckord	Theatre Upstairs and Royal Court	1974
Fourth Day Like Four Long Months of Absence	by Colin Bennett	Traverse Theatre and Theatre Upstairs	1974
Doomduckers Ball	a company adaptation based on an idea by Neil Johnston	Oval House and Theatre Upstairs	1975
Fanshen	by David Hare, adapted from William Hinton	Crucible Studio Theatre and Sheffield	1975
Yesterday’s News	Company devised	West End Centre and Theatre Upstairs	1976
Light Shining in Buckinghamshire	Caryl Churchill	Traverse Theatre and Theatre Upstairs	1976
The Speakers (revival)	adapted by the company from Heathcote Williams 'the speaker'	International tour	1976
Devil’s Island	Tony Bicât	Sherman Theatre and Royal Court	1977
A Thought in Three Parts	Wallace Shawn	ICA	1977
A Mad World, My Masters	Barrie Keeffe	Young Vic and Roundhouse	1977
Epsom Downs	Howard Brenton	Roundhouse	1977
The Glad Hand	Snoo Wilson	Royal Court Theatre	1978
The Ragged Trousered Philanthropists	Stephen Lowe, based on the book by Robert Tressell	Plymouth Arts Centre and Riverside Studios	1978
Cloud Nine	Caryl Churchill	Dartington College of the Arts	1979
The House	David Halliwell	Dartington Hall	1979
An Optimistic Thrust	Company devised	Nuffield Studio Theatre	1980
Cloud Nine (revival)	Caryl Churchill	Royal Court	1980
Say Your Prayers	Nick Darke	College of St. Mark and St. John	1981
Borderline	Hanif Kureishi	Jackson’s Lane Community Centre and Royal Court Theatre	1981
Fen	Caryl Churchill	Almeida Theatre, London	1983
Victory: Choices in Reaction	Howard Baker	Royal Court Theatre	1983
The Crimes of Vautrin	Nicholas Wright	Almeida Theatre, London	1983
The Great Celestial Cow	Sue Townsend	Leister Haymarket	1984
The Power of the Dog	Howard Baker	Drill Hall	1985
Deadlines	Stephen Wakelam	Royal Court & Crucible Theatre, Sheffield	1985
Amid the Standing Corn	Jane Thornton	Soho Poly Theatre, London	1985
Fire in the Lake	Karim Alrawi	Liverpool Playhouse & Theatre Workshop, Edinburgh	1985
Sanctuary	Ralph Brown	Drill Hall & Salisbury Playhouse	1987
Child in the Heart	Karim Alrawi	Drill Hall, London	1988

== External reference ==
- The Joint Stock Theatre Company on The Literary Encyclopedia
- Joint Stock Theatre Group Archives at Special Collections Dept., University Library, University of California, Davis
