= Robert Tressell =

Irish writer

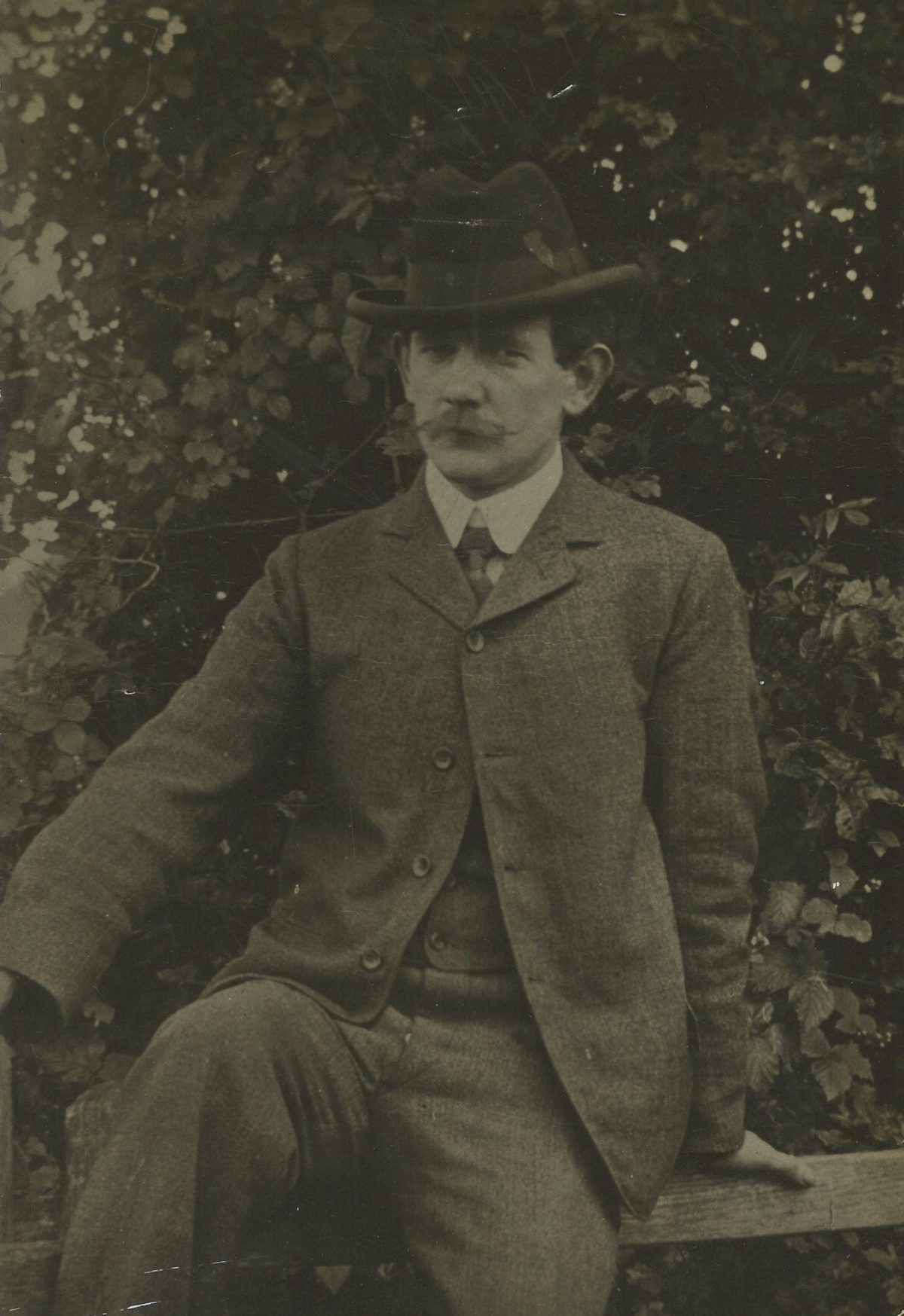
- Tressell c. 1908
- Born: Robert Croker; 17 April 1870; Dublin, Ireland
- Died: 3 February 1911 (aged 40); Liverpool, England
- Resting place: Liverpool Parochial Cemetery (Walton Park Cemetery)
- Occupations: House painter and decorator and author
- Spouse: Elizabeth Hartel (m. 1891; div. 1897)
- Children: 1
- Writing career
- Language: English
- Genre: Social realism
- Notable work: The Ragged-Trousered Philanthropists
- Website: www.1066.net/tressell/

Robert Phillipe Noonan (17 April 1870 – 3 February 1911), born Robert Croker, and best known by the pen name Robert Tressell, was an Irish writer best known for his novel The Ragged-Trousered Philanthropists.

Tressell spent his early adult working life in South Africa. It was in Johannesburg that he was drawn into labour organisation and socialist politics. In Johannesburg, he was also involved with some of the leading protagonists of Irish nationalism.

He returned to England where he continued to work as a painter and decorator in Hastings and wrote his novel The Ragged Trousered Philanthropists, probably between 1906 and 1910, 'about exploitative employment when the only safety nets are charity, workhouse and grave.' George Orwell appraised it as a wonderful book.

== Early life ==
Noonan was born in 37 Wexford Street, Dublin, Ireland, the illegitimate son of Samuel Croker, a former Inspector of the Royal Irish Constabulary, who was by the time of the birth a retired Resident Magistrate. He was baptised and raised a Roman Catholic by his mother Mary Noonan. His father, who was not Catholic, had his own family but attempted to provide for Robert until his death in 1875.

By 1875 Noonan was living in London. He was recorded on the 1881 England census, under his step-father Sebastian Zumbühl's surname, living at 27 Elmore Street, Islington, London. In the words of his daughter, Kathleen, he had "a very good education" and could speak a variety of languages. It seems he may have had the opportunity of entering Trinity College Dublin. By the time he reached sixteen, he showed signs of a radical political consciousness, and left his family, declaring he "would not live on the family income derived largely from absentee landlordism". It was around this time that he changed his surname to his mother's maiden name.

== Adult life ==
=== Liverpool ===
In 1890, Noonan was a signwriter living in Queen's Road, Everton, Liverpool. On 10 June 1890 he appeared at Liverpool County Intermediate Sessions court at Sessions House, Islington, Liverpool after previously having pleaded guilty to housebreaking and larceny on 31 May 1890. On 27 May 1890 he had broken into the dwelling house of his sister's employer, Charles Fay junior, shipping agent, Courtney Road, Great Crosby and stolen a quantity of silver and electro-plated articles. He was given a six-month prison sentence. The case was covered by the Liverpool Mercury newspaper on 2 and 11 June 1890.

=== South Africa ===
By 1891, Noonan had moved to Cape Town, the capital of Britain's Cape Colony where he was a painter and decorator. When he married Elizabeth Hartel in October 1891, he was recorded as "Robert Phillipe Noonan, Decorator". A daughter, Kathleen, was born on 17 September 1892.

In about 1894, Noonan moved to Johannesburg, with Kathleen, who lived in a convent boarding school. In Johannesburg, Noonan worked for the painting and decorating firm of Herbert Evans and seems to have had a foreman's job. During the 1890s a number of attempts were made to organise amongst British and other immigrant workers. One of them was the Trades and Labour Council (TLC), also known as the Transvaal Federated Building Trade Council. In the late 1890s, the organisation represented 'only the building trades, called together by Mr Noonan of Mssrs Herbert Evans and co'. It was in Johannesburg that he was drawn into socialist politics. He was elected to the committee of the newly formed International Independent Labour Party. Elected alongside Noonan was James Thompson Bain and it is possible that through Bain, Noonan was introduced to the socialist ideas of Robert Blatchford, and the political writings of William Morris, both thinkers that influenced the writing found in The Ragged Trousered Philanthropists.

It is possible that Noonan acquiesced in a later notorious aspect of the labour movement in Johannesburg at this time: its support for movement towards racially-segregated workplaces, a policy supported by the Transvaal government at the time.

In 1897, Noonan was granted a divorce, following an appearance as the plaintiff in a hearing at the Supreme Court, in Cape Town. The court granted the divorce and awarded Robert custody of Kathleen. It has been suggested that the failure of his marriage may have provided a sub-plot in The Ragged Trousered Philanthropists that concerns Ruth Easton, who has a child by Alf Slyme.

He became active in the Irish Nationalist circle in the Transvaal. In 1898 Noonan became a member of the executive committee of the Transvaal '98 Commemoration Committee – established to arrange a celebration of the centenary of the Irish uprising. One of those who helped plan the Johannesburg commemoration was an Irish immigrant called Arthur Griffith, and serving on the committee was an assayer of the mine, John MacBride. The Boer government saw militant Irish Nationalism as a potential ally against the British. Noonan left Johannesburg shortly before the Boer War erupted.

Between 1899 and 1901 Robert and Kathleen lived back in Cape Town, in the suburb of Rondebosch. In September 1901 they left for England.

=== England ===
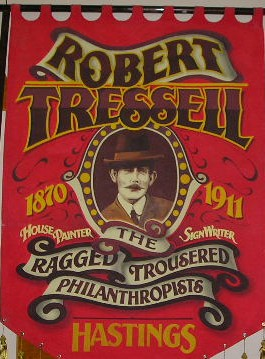
Robert Tressell banner

Noonan began to work as a painter in Hastings, Sussex, but at much lower wages and in far poorer conditions than he had experienced in South Africa. Kathleen was initially sent to boarding and convent schools, including St. Ethelburga's Girls High School, a Roman Catholic convent at Deal, Kent; but in 1904, she transferred to the coeducational and Protestant St Andrew's Public Elementary School in Hastings.

Noonan worked for Bruce & Co and Burton & Co., builders and decorators. He engaged in decorative work in churches in the area. He seems not to have joined a trade union. In 1905 he was fined for obstructing the police when a policeman disrupted his nephew Arthur from setting off fireworks, and around this time also he produced drawings illustrating The Evolution of the Airship, and offered a model airship of his own design to the War Office, but they rejected it.

In 1906 he became a founder member of the Hastings branch of the Social Democratic Federation. A photograph exists that shows Noonan and his daughter attending an outdoor meeting. He began work on The Ragged Trousered Philanthropists. After a dispute with his employer, he left Burton & Co. He worked for Adams and Jarrett. In 1909 Noonan moved to a flat in London Road, Hastings and the SDP (formerly SDF) campaigned against councillors' dealings in the local gas and electricity companies. His health began to deteriorate and in August 1910 he travelled to Liverpool to arrange emigration to Canada.

He wrote under the pen name Robert Tressell as he feared the socialist views expressed in the book would have him blacklisted. He chose the surname Tressell as a play on the trestle table, an important part of a painter and decorator's kit. (Until the full manuscript was published in 1955, all copies of the book cited the author as Robert "Tressall".) He completed The Ragged Trousered Philanthropists, (originally called The Ragged Arsed Philanthropists) in 1910, but the 1,600-page hand-written manuscript was rejected by the three publishing houses. The rejections severely depressed him, and his daughter had to save the manuscript from being burnt. It was placed for safekeeping in a metal box underneath her bed.

== Death ==
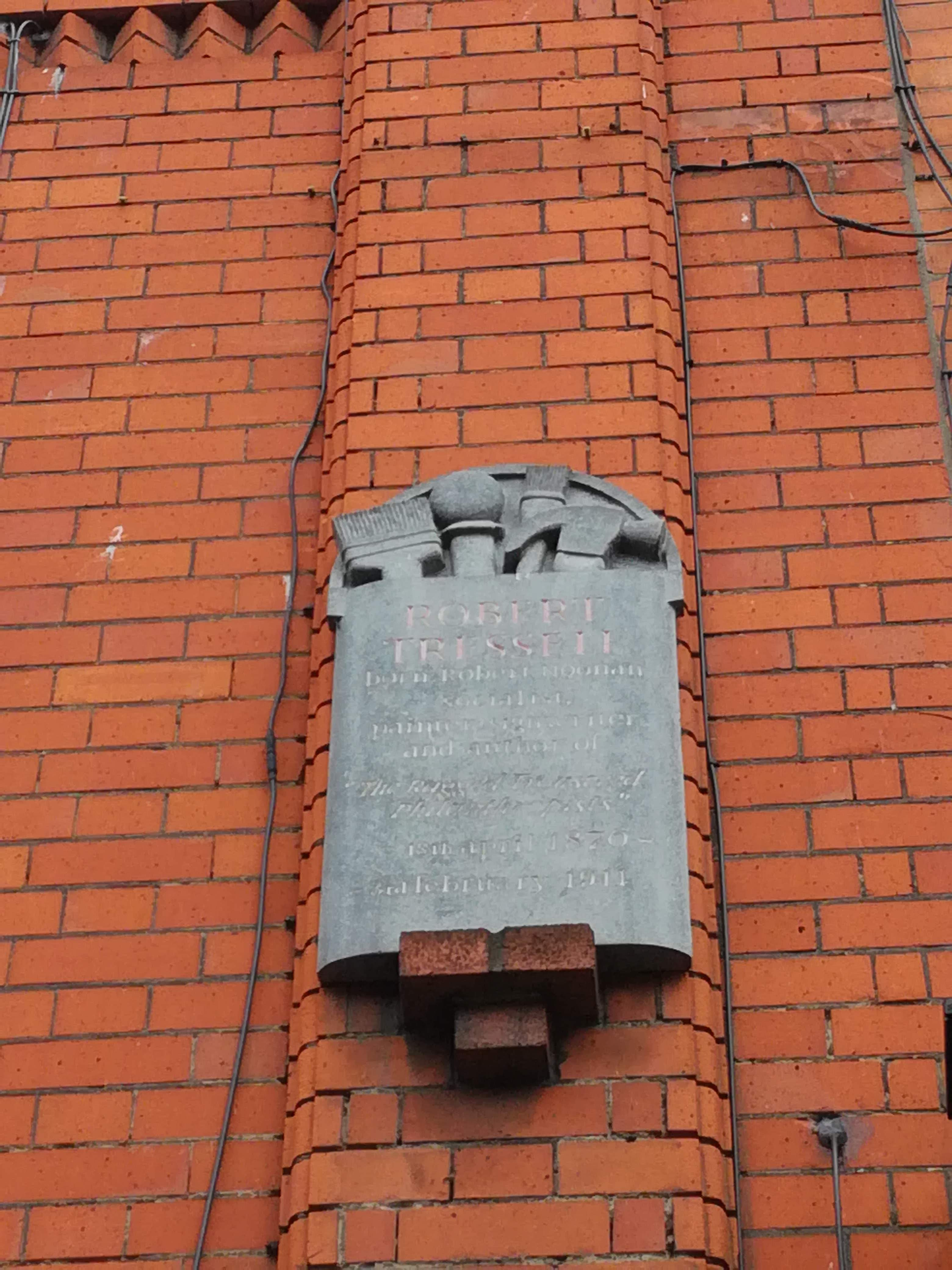
Plaque marking Tressell's birthplace in Dublin.

Unhappy with his life in Britain, he decided that he and Kathleen should emigrate to Canada; however, he only reached Liverpool when he was admitted to the Liverpool Royal Infirmary, where he died of 'phthisis pulmonalis' (i.e. pulmonary tuberculosis) on 3 February 1911, aged 40.

Noonan was buried in a pauper's grave on 10 February 1911 at Liverpool Parochial Cemetery, later known as Walton Park Cemetery. The location of the grave was not rediscovered until 1970. Twelve other people were buried in the same plot. In 1977, local socialists in conjunction with trade unions campaigned for and erected a memorial stone over the plot with the names of all buried there. The plot is no longer used as a cemetery and is now used by Rice Lane City Farm. The site is opposite Walton prison. A nearby road is named Noonan Close.

In 2019, Tressell was commemorated with a march to his graveside led by a brass band.

== Posthumous publication ==
Kathleen mentioned her father's novel in the presence of a visitor to the house where she worked, writer Jessie Pope, who recommended it to her publisher, Grant Richards. In April 1914, the publisher bought the rights to the book for £25, and it appeared in Britain, Canada and the United States later that year, in the Soviet Union in 1920, and in Germany in 1925. The version as originally published was heavily abridged by Pope, with much of the socialist ideology removed. In retrospect, Richards wrote of the book being 'extraordinarily real' and 'damnably subversive'. Pope's version ended with the novel's hero, Frank Owen, contemplating suicide.

The original manuscript was subsequently located by F. C. Ball and, after he had raised funds to acquire and reassemble the original version, an unabridged edition was published in 1955.

The Ragged Trousered Philanthropists has been cited as a factor in the landslide Labour victory in 1945, and even for the election of two non-Labour-endorsed Communist members of Parliament that same year. It has been taught in schools and universities, and adapted for stage, television and radio, and readings have been performed at trade union meetings.

Declan Kiberd has argued that Pádraic Ó Conaire's seminal novel in Irish, Deoraíocht, has many parallels in its progressive socialism with Tressell's The Ragged-Trousered Philanthropists.

== Use of Tressell's name ==
Tressell's name has been used over the years by various groups and individuals, mainly in and around Hastings.

- The Robert Tressell Workshop – a publishing concern based in Hastings.
- Robert Tressell Close – a small residential street in Hastings named after the writer.
- Robert Tressell Walk – a residential street in Lincoln named after the writer.
- Tressell Ward – a political ward in Hastings.
- The Robert Tressell Lectures – a series of annual lectures concerning not only The Ragged Trousered Philanthropists, but also other aspects of left-wing politics and sociology.
- Tressell Publications – a small politically based publishing house.
- Robert Tressell Halls of Residence – accommodation for students studying at University of Brighton's Hastings Campus.
- Noonan's Steps – name of a stepped passageway running alongside the author's former home at 115 Milward Road, Hastings.
- Tressell Ward – a Medical ward in the Conquest Hospital, St Leonards-on-Sea
- Noonan Close – a residential street in Walton, Liverpool.
