= Piranha Heights =

- Promotional artwork for the play created by Philip Ridley
- Written by: Philip Ridley
- Characters: Alan (male, aged 37); Terry (male, aged 42); Lilly (female, aged 15); Medic (male, aged 16); Garth (male, aged 15)
- Original language: English
- Genre: In-yer-face theatre, black comedy, farce
- Setting: The top-floor flat of a tower block in the East End of London

Premiere
- Date premiered: 15 May 2008
- Place premiered: Soho Theatre, London

Piranha Heights is a one act play by Philip Ridley. It is his seventh stage play for adults and premiered at the Soho Theatre, London in 2008. The production was the second collaboration between Ridley and Soho Theatre Artistic Director Lisa Goldman, to whom Ridley dedicated the play in his preface of the published text. The play also featured Luke Treadaway in one of his earliest professional stage credits, who along with actor John Macmillan was filmed for Ridley's 2009 horror film Heartless, during the play's original run.

Piranha Heights serves as the third and final instalment in Ridley's unofficially titled "Brothers Trilogy", having been preceded by Mercury Fur and Leaves of Glass.

The play was later revived at The Old Red Lion Theatre in 2014 for which Ridley substantially revised the script.

== Plot ==
The play takes place on Mother's Day where Alan is in his mother's flat. Unexpectedly his brother Terry turns up, having been missing since after their Mother's death several weeks before.

Terry has brought along with him a fifteen-year-old girl called Lilly who lives in a squat in a nearby flat.

Tension mounts while the anger builds between the two brothers as they argue over who should inherit the flat, as well as argue their conflicting memories of their deceased mother.

Eventually Lilly's partner The Medic arrives. He is a sixteen-year-old boy who frequently swings from being overly grateful to extremely angry. He along with Lilly look after a plastic baby doll called Bubba which they treat as if it is their own child.

Also showing up at the flat unexpectedly is Alan's 15-year-old son Garth, who for years has hidden his true psychotic personality, enjoying to inflict cruelty onto others under the influence of his imaginary friend called Mr Green.

Taking place in real time and spanning approximately ninety minutes in length, chaos ensues in the flat as the characters go to extreme lengths to achieve their aims.

== Notable productions ==
Premiere

15 May 2008 at the Soho Theatre, London.
Directed by Lisa Goldman.

- Alan - Nicolas Tennant
- Terry - Matthew Wait
- Lilly - Jade Williams
- Medic - John Macmillan
- Garth - Luke Treadaway

Shortlisted for The MOBIUS Best Off-West End Production Award at the 2009 WhatsOnStage.com Theatregoers Choice Awards

2014 revival

11 November 2014 at the Old Red Lion Theatre, London.
Directed by Max Barton.

- Alan - Alex Lowe
- Terry - Phil Cheadle
- Lilly - Rebecca Boey
- Medic - Ryan Gerald
- Garth - Jassa Ahluwalia

== Initial reception ==
The original production received generally positive reviews.

Michael Coveney of WhatsOnStage.com gave an enthusiastic review, awarding the play five stars, writing that “With this truly remarkable new play, Philip Ridley completes an East End trilogy of siblings and apocalypse – the others were Mercury Fur and Leaves of Glass – that will one day be rated one of the high water marks of British drama in the first decade of this century” adding that the production was “a work of dark fantasy and genius.” Philip Fisher of British Theatre Guide gave a positive review, stating that the play “is the theatrical equivalent of a gigantic Jackson Pollock splatter painting. It is shocking with little surface meaning but is addictive and, to some, inexplicably attractive.” Aleks Sierz for The Stage praised the play, writing that “although the imaginary element of the play is often outrageously cruel and breathtakingly audacious, it is always firmly grounded in the emotional truth of character” and that “it really feels as if Ridley has single-handedly brought white-knuckle excitement and appalling truth back to the new [play]writing scene.”

The Guardian critic Lyn Gardner, though giving a mostly positive review, only awarded the play three stars, saying that it is “not a show for everyone and definitely not for the faint-hearted.” Time Out London gave a mostly positive review remarking that “there is some fine writing here, combined with moments of knuckle-whitening tension” and that the play “evokes the all too recognisable violence and madness of modern Britain.” However, the magazine criticised elements of Ridley's writing, saying that the “script never quite decides whether it's a farce or magical realism” and also added that “[it is] a bit of a mess structurally – as if three separate plays are fighting for attention.”

On seeing the original production actor Ben Whishaw, who had starred in two of Ridley's previous adult plays (Mercury Fur and Leaves of Glass), remarked that It was "extraordinary and very moving. It put me in a kind of trance. I love the way he [Philip Ridley] writes about fantasy, truth, honesty and lies with such courage, passion, humour and poetry. I think he's a true original"

However, the play was not greeted with praise from all reviewers. Writing for the Evening Standard Fiona Mountford gave the play a 1-star review, describing it as "one of the most gratuitously unpleasant works in months, where plot, character and general point all come a distant second behind a long-past-its-sell-by-date desire to shock." She added that "I think Ridley is trying to say that young people today are traumatised and brutalised by the world around them. However, with characters like these, whose emotions and motivations are as random as the movements in a game of pinball, it's impossible to give two hoots about any of it."

Ian Shuttleworth in his prompt corner column for Theatre Record took a dislike to Ridley's use of Lilly's character speaking most of the play in a made-up Middle-Eastern type language, stating that “a character spouting vaguely Middle-Eastern gibberish which is meant to be Arabic prayer is going to be seen with some justification as insulting – not because we're living in sensitive times and need to be politically correct or whatever, but simply because it has all the unsubtlety and laziness of those 1970s TV sitcoms where Europeans or Mexicans were inherently funny simply because they sounded different, and any stereotypical different sounds would do.” He, however, wrote, explaining that he understood that the “character has a point inside the play” but stated that the character “has implications beyond [outside the play’s context]; and I think it's too easy to give the writer a free pass because of claims that he's being bold or challenging” adding that “often [Ridley] doesn't know when to stop.”
