= Tender Napalm =

2011 play by Philip Ridley

- Promotional poster of the original production. Vinette Robinson left as 'Woman' and Jack Gordon right as 'Man'.
- Original language: English
- Written by: Philip Ridley
- Characters: Man; Woman

Premiere
- Date: 19 April 2011
- Place: Southwark Playhouse, London

Tender Napalm is a 2011 play by Philip Ridley. Ridley's eighth stage play for adults, it premiered at London's Southwark Playhouse on 19 April 2011.

The original production was directed by David Mercatali, who previously directed the professional revival of Ridley's 2004 play Moonfleece in 2010. Since then Mercatali has collaborated with Ridley a number of times in directing the premiere productions for the majority of Ridley's new stage plays.

The production starred Vinette Robinson as Woman and Jack Gordon as Man, who had previously played a minor role in the 2009 horror film Heartless which was written and directed by Ridley.

== Plot ==
The play shows the interplay between a Man and Woman.

Through their dialogue they speak with poetic intensity and describe being involved in highly imaginative and improbable situations, such as leading armies of monkeys, fighting a sea serpent and being abducted by aliens.

They both speak romantically to each other - describing with passion how they find each other beautiful - as well as violently - such as performing sexual acts on each other with weaponry.

Throughout the majority of the play the audience is unaware as to what is fantasy and what is reality, with the narrative frequently shifting within the interplay of the Man and Woman.

== Cast ==
Characters	World Premiere	US Premiere	Off-Broadway Revival
Characters	2011	2012	2024
Man	Jack Gordon	Blake Ellis	Ben Ahlers
Woman	Vinette Robinson	Amelia Workman	Victoria Pedretti

== Productions ==
Country	Date	Location	Director	Notes	Details
England	19 April 2011; 10 May 2012	Southwark Playhouse, London	David Mercatali	Produced by Supporting Wall: Man - Jack Gordon Tom Byam Shaw; Woman - Vinette Robinson Lara Rossi	World Premiere
Australia	19 August 2011	The Studio Underground, Perth; State Theatre Centre of Western Australia	Melissa Cantwell	Produced by Perth Theatre Company: Man - Joshua Brennan; Woman - Anna Houston	Australian Premiere
The United States	23 August 2012	Theater C, 59E59 Theaters, New York	Paul Takacs	Produced by The Shop: Man - Blake Ellis; Woman - Amelia Workman	United States Premiere
Ireland	27 November 2012	Space Upstairs, Project Arts Centre, Dublin	Marc Atkinson	Produced by Sugarglass Theatre: Man - Aaron Heffernan; Woman - Erica Murray	Irish Premiere
Australia	21 September 2012	The Roundhouse Theatre, Brisbane	David Berthold	Produced by La Boite Theatre Company: Man - Kurt Phelan; Woman - Ellen Bailey	Australian Revival
Canada	8 August 2013	Theatre Passe Muraille Backspace, Toronto	Cynthia Ashperger	Produced by Phantasmagoria Collective: Man - Kyle Purcell; Woman - Amelia Sargisson	Canadian Premiere
Malta	30 January 2014; 10-25 August 2014	St James Cavalier, Valletta; C Nova, Studio 1, Edinburgh Fringe Festival	Tonni Attard	Produced by Unifaun Theatre Productions: Man - Andre Agius; Woman - Bettina Paris	Maltese Premiere
The United States	18 March 2014	Signature Theatre, Arlington County, Virginia	Matthew Gardiner	Produced by Signature Theatre: Man - Elan Zafir; Woman - Laura C. Harris	Washington D.C. Premiere
Wales	29 May 2014	Chapter Arts Centre, Cardiff	Chris Durnall	Produced by Company of Sirens: Man - Jannah Warlow; Woman - Matthew Bulgo	Welsh Premiere
Spain	8 July 2017	Sala Beckett, Barcelona	Pau Roca	Produced by Sixto Pax: Man - Pau Roca; Woman - Ariadna Cabrol	Barcelona Premiere
The United States	18 July 2019	Dorothy B. Williams Theatre; HERE Arts Center, New York	David Norwood	Executive Produced by Ayana Parker Morrison: Man - Amara James Aja; Woman - Ayana Major Bey	First African-American Production
The United States	27 November 2024	Theaterlab, New York	Rory McGregor	Producted by Steady Hand Studios: Man - Ben Ahlers; Woman - Victoria Pedretti	United States Revival

== Music ==
"Fade and Float"

Single by Dreamskin Cradle
- Released: 28 March 2011
- Length: 4:27
- Songwriters: Philip Ridley, Nick Bicât

Featured in the play is the song Fade and Float, the lyrics of which were written by Ridley. The song was developed into a full studio recording by Ridley's band Dreamskin Cradle, which consists of Nick Bicât as composer, Mary Leay as singer, and Ridley as lyricist. The record was released as a single on all major download sites in March 2011.

== Reception and accolades ==
=== Critical response ===
The play's original production was met with mostly positive reviews, with praise going to the performances of Jack Gordon and Vinette Robinson, the direction of David Mercatali, as well as Ridley's writing for its use of imagination, poetic language and ambition.

Lyn Gardner for The Guardian awarded the play 4 stars, praising the direction and performances: “It is simply and sensationally staged by David Mercatali, and performed as if its two actors feel every word simultaneously like a caress along the spine and a fist in the face.” She also wrote in admiration of the script, stating that “Ridley's play is completely and dizzyingly of itself. The writing seethes and burns. It goes not just into the bedroom, but into the mind, the secret places that we hide from everyone except lovers. Seldom has sexual love been explored on stage with such ferocious honesty, brutality and melting tenderness.” Susannah Clapp for The Observer praised the production for its acting, writing that “Jack Gordon and Vinette Robinson should make their names in this. They perform both dance and dialogue magnificently. They swirl around each other as if the stage were a jacuzzi.” She also praised Ridley's use of dialogue for imaginatively “paint[ing] pictures of passion… It is wild, obvious, flailing, babyish, luscious” Neil Dowden of Exeunt Magazine praised the production for the performances – “there is real chemistry in the acting” – along with the writing: “Tender Napalm shows Ridley at his most poetic, concocting a fractured, shimmering sequence of video-game-style images to illuminate the primal feelings between a man and a woman struggling together in love.” Aleks Sierz for The Arts Desk wrote a glowing review, declaring that “[Ridley’s] first new play in three years, which opened last night, breaks fresh ground and represents an imaginative leap of the gleaming dark of his wild, wild imagination… As the pounding music sets the scene, and both actors start to flex their muscles, you immediately feel the beads of sweat gathering on your brow. A quiet voice deep inside tells you that this is going to be a good one. And it is!... this is a fabulous piece of imaginative writing. Long live Ridley!”

However, not all reviews were completely positive. Though still awarding the play 4 stars, Michael Coveney of WhatsOnStage.com found fault in the last 15 minutes for being “perhaps… over-freighted with Shoreditch and Essex detail, and the missing father figure on both sides doesn’t play with much dramatic significance.” He however still praised the production effusively for being “a rough, raucous, verbally extravagant and sometimes shocking theatrical firecracker, [that] makes you realise how pallid most theatre writing – and acting – can be when everyone’s on their best behaviour.” Philip Fisher of British Theatre Guide wrote in admiration for the boldness of Ridley's writing, saying that “Ridley might be the last bastion of In-Yer-Face Theatre. Where others have mellowed and generate plays like anyone else of their now middle-aged generation, he still gleefully pushes the boundaries of form and taste. Whether that is a good thing could be open to debate.” He however did question as to what the meaning was behind the play: “Quite what message it wishes to convey is not entirely clear, possibly that love conquers all, at least for a period, since death is an inevitability” but noted that “In any event, the two actors give their all and sensible audience members will enjoy the acting and wallow in the exotic poetry and imagery, rather than wondering why they are there.” Time Out London awarded the play 3 stars. While writing that it was “ferociously well acted” and that the play was “evocative, hallucinatory stuff” the publication criticised the script, stating that “I’m not sure Ridley has got the balance of tenderness and napalm quite right. The underlying warmth takes the danger out of the pair’s flights of fancy, but their words and actions remain too opaque to let you in emotionally.” However, the magazine still wrote that despite its flaws the production was “an unforgettable 80 minutes.” Dominic Cavendish of The Daily Telegraph however awarded the play only two stars. While lauding Ridley's ambition – “I won’t deny that this is a tricksy, inventive, risk-taking piece - Ridley is a clever man, and he likes to play with theatrical fire” – he criticised the writing for being overblown: “For all its conceptual neatness, though, there’s a slapdash, jejune and over-ripe texture to the script… a rampaging, hormonal quality may be part of the point… yet all the hyperactive fabulation shreds our capacity to care.”

Either way the play was a success and was nominated for a variety of awards and featured on a number of 'best theatre of the year' lists, Including for Time Out London, The Observer and The Guardian

In July 2011 acclaimed actor Ben Daniels wrote an article for The Guardian describing Jack Gordon's and Vinette Robinson's acting as “the best performance I’ve ever seen” saying that “the actors only had each other, and the way they worked together was glorious. Not once did you wish there was a set. And because it was in traverse you could see other people watching it with you, watching you have this visceral response. It's very rare to actually see people having a similar response to you. It was a unique feeling, and afterwards I felt jittery, like the carpet had been pulled from under my feet. Performances like theirs make you want to be better.”

=== Awards and nominations ===
- London Fringe Best Play Award - Nominated
- Vinette Robinson received the 2012 Offie for Best Female Performance
- Ben Monks and Will Young were jointly nominated for the 2011 & 2012 Offies for Best Producer - Supporting Wall.
- David Mercatali was nominated for the 2011 Offie for Best Director - 'Feathers in the Snow'
- Evening Standard Theatre Award for Best Newcomer for David Mercatali - Longlisted
