= Leaves of Glass =

Play by Philip Ridley

- Cover of the published play-text
- Original language: English
- Written by: Philip Ridley
- Characters: Steven (male, aged 27); Barry (male, aged 22); Debbie (female, aged 33); Liz (female, aged 55)

Premiere
- Date: 3 May 2007
- Place: Soho Theatre, London

Leaves of Glass is the sixth adult stage play by Philip Ridley. It premiered at the Soho Theatre in London, England, on 3 May 2007.

The play was commissioned and directed by Lisa Goldman after being greatly impressed by Ridley's previous adult stage play Mercury Fur. The production was Lisa Goldman's first in her tenure as artistic director of the Soho Theatre. Like Mercury Fur the play starred Ben Whishaw in its premiere production.

It is the second entry in Ridley's unofficially titled "Brothers Trilogy", preceded by Mercury Fur and followed by Piranha Heights.

== Story ==
The play is about two brothers, Steven and Barry. Steven is the head of a successful graffiti removal company and Barry, his younger brother, works for him as he is struggling to get income and recognition from being an artist.

The play concerns the silence which has prevailed over a traumatic incident from their childhood, which for years they have been unwilling to talk about and come to terms with.

== Structure ==
Leaves of Glass was the first of Ridley's plays for adults that completely rejects Aristotle's unities of drama, with the story instead taking place in a variety of locations and spanning many months. It has seventeen scenes and no interval with the play lasting approximately two hours in performance.

Although two of Ridley's previous plays The Fastest Clock in the Universe and Ghost from a Perfect Place each had two acts with a space for an interval, each act retained the same location with a very small time gap between each.

Commenting on the structure of Leaves of Glass, Ridley said the following:

"the initial draft perhaps was sort of more real-time, one location. [...] I love doing that, I mean, I think that's what theatre does best and... It always amazes me that people are surprised that I should be drawn to that kind of form of telling a play because that's one of the things that theatre does so well, is real-time. Where else can you experience that? Certainly not in film now. But then what happened was that I really got into this idea of — which is what the play has ended up doing — of sort of like coming into scenes at very jagged angles. [In the play] you get kind of like layers of these scenes, like kind of little pieces of broken glass that come in. The scenes begin when they are already up and moving; the action is already happening and they don't kind of finish on a kind of particular comforting way; there is no kind of dying fall at the end. You're just in and out of these scenes almost like cinematic cuts. [...] And I quite liked that kind of oblique way of telling of what is, in a way, a very oblique story. I thought that was part of the theatrical experience for me of this kind of [...] circular descent that [the character of] Steve is on of memory and morality."

== Notable productions ==
World premiere (London, 2007)

3 May 2007 at The Soho Theatre, London.
Directed by Lisa Goldman.

- Steven - Ben Whishaw
- Barry - Trystan Gravelle
- Debbie - Maxine Peake
- Liz - Ruth Sheen

U.S. premiere (New York, 2009)

18 January 2009 at the Peter Jay Sharp Theater at Playwrights Horizons, New York.
Co-produced by Origin Theatre Company and Stiff Upper Lip.
Directed by Ludovica Villar-Hauser.

- Steven - Victor Villar-Hauser
- Barry - Euan Morton
- Debbie - Xanthe Elbrick
- Liz - Alexa Kelly

UK revival (2023 and 2024)

11 May–3 June 2023 at Park Theatre, London.
15–17 June 2023 at the Yvonne Arnaud Theatre, Guilford.
3–8 July 2023 at the Hope Mill Theatre, Manchester.
16 January–10 February 2024 at Park Theatre, London.
Co-produced by Lidless Theatre and Zoe Weldon in association with Park Theatre and Theatre Deli.
Directed by Max Harrison.

- Steven - Ned Costello
- Barry - Joseph Potter
- Debbie - Katie Buchholz (2023 run) / Katie Eldred (2024 run).
- Liz - Kacey Ainsworth

Ned Costello received the 2024 Offie for 'Lead Performance in a Play', and nominated for the 'Performance Ensemble' Offie.
