= John Macmillan (actor) =

British actor

- Education: Webber Douglas Academy of Dramatic Art (BA)
- Years active: 2007–present

John Macmillan (also credited as MacMillan) is a British actor. He began his career in theatre, earning an Ian Charleson Award nomination for his work in Hamlet and Macbeth. He was nominated for a Satellite Award for his performance in the BBC Two adaptation of King Lear (2018).

His television work includes the BBC One drama Silk (2011–2014), the Channel 4 sitcom Chewing Gum (2015–2017), and the Channel 4 sitcoms Back (2017–2021) and Hang Ups (2018).

== Early life ==
Macmillan attended the Waterford Kamhlaba United World College in Mbabane, Swaziland (now Eswatini). He has also lived in Johannesburg, Malawi, Zambia, and Oxford. Macmillan trained at the Webber Douglas Academy of Dramatic Art in London. In 2011, Macmillan opened a garden at Chatsworth Baptist Church School in West Norwood.

== Career ==
Macmillan began his career in theatre, going on the 2007 international tour of Cymbeline as Guideris. The following year, he appeared in The Last Days of Judas Iscariot at the Almeida Theatre and Philip Ridley's Piranha Heights at Soho Theatre. He received an Ian Charleson Award nominations for his performances in the 2009 productions of Hamlet and Macbeth. That year, Macmillan made his screen debut with small roles in the horror film Heartless and the fifth series of the BBC One crime drama Hustle as Harry Fielding. In 2011, Macmillan starred in the short Friend Request Pending and appeared in the Joe Wright's 2010 action thriller film Hanna. That same year, he began starring as clerk Joe Bright in the BBC One drama Silk.

In 2015, Macmillan played staff nurse Joe Costello in the Sky One medical drama Critical (CR:IT:IC:AL), appeared in The Homecoming at Trafalgar Studios, and began playing Ronald, Tracey's long-term boyfriend in Michaela Coel's Netflix sitcom Chewing Gum. Macmillan played Victor in both the 2016 and 2017 productions of Yerma alongside Billie Piper. The cast and crew won an Obie Award in the Special Citations category. He starred in the Philip Ridley play Killer, directed by Jamie Lloyd, at Shoreditch Town Hall. He starred as Troye King Jones in Simon Amstell's mockumentary film Carnage and began playing Julian in the Channel 4 sitcom Back. For his performance in the 2018 BBC Two television film adaptation of King Lear, Macmillan was nominated for a Satellite Award for Best Supporting Actor. Also in 2018, Macmillan starred as Abs Walter in the Channel 4 sitcom Hang Ups and began appearing in the Black British sketch comedy Famalam.

Macmillan played Laenor Velaryon, Princess Rhaenyra's first husband, in the first season of the HBO fantasy series House of the Dragon, a Game of Thrones prequel and adaptation of George R. R. Martin's companion book Fire and Blood.

== Acting credits ==
=== Film ===
Year	Title	Role	Notes
2009	Heartless	She	
2011	Hanna	Lewis	
2011	The Hype Man	Miles	Short film; also directed, wrote and produced
2011	Friend Request Pending	Jason	Short film, part of Stars in Shorts
2012	The Dark Knight Rises	Analyst	
2012	A Scholarship	Leon	Short film
2013	World War Z	Officer	
2014	Paddy	The Sage	Short film
2014	Maleficent	Captain	
2014	Fury	Corporal	
2017	Carnage	Troye King Jones	Mockumentary
2020	Heaven Can Wait		Short film, part of Boys on Film 20
2021	The Dig	Dr. Rothman	
2021	Ron's Gone Wrong	Bubble Techs (voice)	
2022	The People We Hate at the Wedding	Ollie	Amazon Prime film
2024	Seize Them!	King Guthrum	
2025	The Woman in Cabin 10	Captain Addis	

=== Television ===
Year	Title	Role	Notes
2009	Hustle	Harry Fielding	2 episodes (series 5)
2010	Sherlock	Community Police Officer	Episode: "The Blind Banker"
2011–2014	Silk	John Bright	Main role
2012	Panto!	Finlay	Christmas special
2014	New Tricks	Archie	Episode: "Bermondsey Boy"
2015	Critical	Justin Costello	9 episodes
2015	Hoff the Record	Marcus Fuster	Episode: "The Movie"
2015–2017	Chewing Gum	Ronald	5 episodes
2016	The Windsors	Richard	1 episode
2016	Barbarians Rising	Mago	Episode: "Resistance"
2016	Ordinary Lies	Adam	Episode: "Holly"
2017	Midsomer Murders	Solomon Franks	Episode: "Death by Persuasion"
2017–2021	Back	Julian	8 episodes
2018–2020	Famalam	Various	Sketch comedy (13 episodes)
2018	Kiss Me First	Saul Green	Episode: "You Can Never Go Home"
2018	King Lear	Edmund	Television film
2018	Hang Ups	Adebowale "Abs" Walter	Main role
2019	The Accident	Gareth Jarvis	1 episode
2019	Dial M for Middlesbrough	Chad	Television film
2020	The Trouble with Maggie Cole	Jez	2 episodes
2021	The Nevers	Byner	Episode: "True"
2022	House of the Dragon	Laenor Velaryon	Episodes: "The Princess and the Queen" and "Driftmark"
2022	Ghosts	Scott	Episode: "Speak as ye choose"
2023	Extraordinary	Dr Wedderburn	Episode: "Pet Project"
2023	The Cleaner	Strazzamo	Episode: "The Clown"
2023	The Great	John Quirkton	Episode: "Choose Your Weapon"
2023	The Burning Girls	Mike Sudduth	Main role
2025	Surface	Richard Wilcox	Recurring (Season 2)
2026	Ponies	Tom Hasbeck	Recurring

=== Theatre ===
Year	Title	Role	Playwright	Notes
2007	Cymbeline	Guiderius	Wiliam Shakespeare	International tour
2008	The Last Days of Judas Iscariot	Bailiff / Simon the Zealot	Stephen Adly Guirguis	Almeida Theatre, London
2008	Piranha Heights	Medic	Phillip Ridley	Soho Theatre, London
2009	Hamlet	Rosencrantz	William Shakespeare	Donmar Warehouse, London / Broadhurst Theatre, New York
2009	Macbeth	Malcolm	William Shakespeare	Royal Exchange, Manchester
2012	Children's Children	Castro	Matthew Dunster	Almeida Theatre, London
2015	The Homecoming	Joey	Harold Pinter	Trafalgar Studios, London
2016, 2017,	Yerma	Victor	Simon Stone, after Lorca	Young Vic, London
2017	Killer	Various	Phillip Ridley	One man play; Shoreditch Town Hall, London
2018	Yerma	Victor	Simon Stone	Park Avenue Armoury, New York
2018	Pinter Two: The Lover/ The Collection	Richard / James	Harold Pinter	Harold Pinter Theatre, West End, London
2023	Phaedra	Eric	Simon Stone, after Euripides, Seneca and Racine	Royal National Theatre, London
2025	The Lady from the Sea	Lyle	Simon Stone	Bridge Theatre, London
2026	The Oresteia	Jerome	Simon Stone	Bridge Theatre, London

=== Video games ===
Year	Title	Role	Notes
2017	Horizon Zero Dawn	Varl	
2018	Overkill's The Walking Dead	Aiden	
2019	Blood & Truth		
2020	Troy: A Total War Saga		
2020	Amnesia: Rebirth	James Henry "Hank" Mitchell	
2020	Spellforce 3: Fallen God	Zazka	
2022	Horizon Forbidden West	Varl	

=== Audio ===
Year	Title	Role	Notes
2016–2018	Tommies	Juma Gubanda / Leland Moody	5 episodes
2020	The Sandman	African Morpheus	20 episodes

== Awards and nominations ==
Year	Award	Category	Work	Result	Ref.
2009	Ian Charleson Awards	Commendations	Macbeth and Hamlet	Nominated	
2018	Obie Awards	Special Citations	Yerma	Won	(Note: Shared with the Yerma cast and crew.)
2018	Satellite Awards	Best Supporting Actor – Series, Miniseries or Television Film	King Lear	Nominated	
