= The Pitchfork Disney =

Play by Philip Ridley

- Poster advertising the original 1991 production
- Original language: English
- Written by: Philip Ridley
- Characters: Presley Stray (Male, aged 28); Haley Stray (Female, aged 28); Cosmo Disney (Male, aged 18); Pitchfork Cavalier (Male)
- Genre: In-yer-face theatre
- Setting: "A dimly lit room in the East End of London"

Premiere
- Date: 2 January 1991
- Place: Bush Theatre, London

The Pitchfork Disney is a 1991 stage play by Philip Ridley. It was Ridley's first professional stage work, having also produced work as a visual artist, novelist, filmmaker, and scriptwriter for film and radio. The play premiered at the Bush Theatre in London, UK in 1991 and was directed by Matthew Lloyd, who directed most of Ridley's subsequent early plays.

Although initially met with negative critical reviews for its script, the production was enthusiastically received by predominantly young audiences, making it something of a controversial hit. Over time, the play has come to be regarded as a seminal work in the confrontational 1990s style and sensibility of British drama termed in-yer-face theatre.

The play is the first entry in Ridley's unofficially titled "East End Gothic Trilogy", followed by The Fastest Clock in the Universe and Ghost from a Perfect Place.

In 2015, the script was republished as part of the Methuen Drama Modern Classics series, recognising the play's impact on modern British theatre.

== Synopsis ==
The play opens with the characters of Presley and Haley, two adults living alone in the East End of London. They lead a childish fantasy existence, subsisting mostly on chocolate. Their parents died a decade before, although their exact fate is not described. They tell each other stories and discuss their dreams and fears.

From their window, they see two men, one of whom is apparently sick. Agitated, Haley sucks on a drugged dummy and goes to sleep. Despite their fear of outsiders, Presley brings the sick man in, who promptly vomits on the floor. The man introduces himself as Cosmo Disney, and explains that he and his partner are showmen. His sickness is caused by the fact that his particular talent consists of eating insects and small animals. Cosmo emotionally manipulates Presley who tells Cosmo about a recurring dream he has, involving a serial killer named 'The Pitchfork Disney'.

Almost immediately after Presley finishes his story, Cosmo's partner arrives—a huge, masked, apparently mute figure named Pitchfork Cavalier. His act is simply taking his mask off to reveal his hideously deformed face. He sings a wordless song, dances with the unconscious Haley and eats some chocolate. Cosmo convinces Presley to accompany Pitchfork to the shops, promising friendship. As soon as they leave, Cosmo performs a sexual assault on Haley by inserting one of his fingers soaked in medicine into her mouth. Presley unexpectedly returns and, realising Cosmo's true motives, breaks the finger with which he had assaulted Haley. Cosmo flees. Pitchfork briefly returns, terrifies Presley and then leaves. Haley awakes and both her and Presley express their fear.

== Themes and interpretation ==
The play is a dreamlike piece with surreal elements. It primarily deals with fear, particularly childhood fears. Dreams and stories are also explored, and indeed, the entire play can be interpreted as a dream.

Another recurring theme is that of snakes, being described by Presley in two monologues. In the first he describes killing one in a frying pan; and in the second, seeing one kill a mouse in the reptile house of a zoo and then later coming home and watching a television programme about a Christian cult who worship snakes. Cosmo himself can be interpreted as being a manifestation of a snake as he eats insects and small animals, claims to have hatched from an egg, and that he got new skin from unzipping and throwing away the skin he had as a baby. In one monologue, Presley describes seeing a snake shed its skin to reveal bright red new skin. This description seems to echo Cosmo, who enters the play wearing a long black overcoat which he takes off to reveal a red-sequinned jacket.

Concerning interpretations of The Pitchfork Disney, Ridley said in 2016 that "Every time it’s revived it means something different. There’s a production of it on in Canada at the moment which in the present climate is being seen as a play about terrorism – about the fear of the outside coming in and the fear of change. A few years ago it was about the fear of sex, intimacy, of being touched... [my plays are] like tuning forks, they vibrate with whatever’s going on in the atmosphere at the time."

== Development ==
Ridley began writing the play while as a student at St Martin's School of Art. As part of his studies he had created a series of performance art pieces, which Ridley performed in art galleries, consisting of long fast-paced monologues that depicted dream sequences and characters with shifting identities. Some of Ridley's friends, who were leaving art school to pursue acting, suggested that his monologues would make a good basis for a stage play. He began writing The Pitchfork Disney based on two of his monologues—about a character who was afraid of everything, and one who was afraid of nothing—imagining what would happen if the characters met.

Elements of the play might be based on events from Ridley's life. Describing his experience as a child visiting Brick Lane Market, Ridley said "I saw a snake charmer there once. And you could have your photograph taken with monkeys wearing red jackets. I've got a photo of me holding the two poor creatures. All three of us look terrified." In his semiautobiographical prose Introduction to his first collection of plays, Ridley describes how, when he was 18 years old, he saw a man in a pub wearing a red sequined jacket eat a variety of insects onstage for entertainment.

One of Ridley's St Martins tutors advised him to send the play to a dramatic agent. He sent it to the agent Rod Hall, who Ridley says called him a few days later saying "I've just read your play. I don't know what it is. I don't know what to make of it. But all I do know is that I've never quite read anything like it before. So come in and we'll get it on somewhere."

Hall sent the script to The Hampstead Theatre where Matthew Lloyd was literary manager. Lloyd said of his experience reading the script for that first time that "it sort of blew my head off. It was so startling. There was just like nothing else that had this kind of febrile energy… I was sort of trembling with excitement." However, the theatre's artistic director, whilst appreciative of Lloyd's enthusiasm, did not want the play to be performed there. Lloyd said there was "caution about putting [the play] on" because it was "a strange play. This was unusual. It didn't fit into sort of tidy categories. And it was breaking all sorts of rules and kind of pushing the boundaries."

Despite this, Lloyd was adamant for the play to be staged, so arranged to have a meeting with Ridley. Lloyd says of their first meeting that Ridley "wasn't just enjoying my praise and my evident excitement. He was enjoying being challenged and being called on a lot of his writerly decisions." Lloyd says that he felt there were "all sorts of problems with [the initial draft of] The Pitchfork Disney" so he gave dramaturgical feedback to Ridley. Lloyd says he did this for each of Ridley's plays he directed, stating: "I've seen an early draft and given a lot of notes [to Ridley] and we've had a lot of conversations and we've interrogated the text really, really fiercely together. And then he's done another draft. And then we've done that again. And then he's done another draft. So by the time I get into rehearsal with actors I really feel that I've got strong authority over what this story is and why it's being told and how to tell it."

Lloyd directed The Pitchfork Disney himself by taking an unpaid sabbatical from his literary manager position and re-mortgaging his home, saying that "I felt like I was sticking my neck out. I'd set the whole thing out in such a way that I could go back to my literary-manager job if all of this was a terrible mistake."

The play had its premiere production at The Bush Theatre in January 1991. The theatre's artistic director Dominic Dromgoole wrote that he "stole The Pitchfork Disney in an entirely disgraceful manner off another theatre, The Old Red Lion. It was vital to me that we produced it." However, Lloyd said that the Bush Theatre instead "didn't want to produce [the play] themselves. I gave them the opportunity to be the producers of it but they said they just didn't sort of trust it. So they gave me a visiting company slot. So I kind of did it under my own aegis."

== Reception and legacy ==
=== Initial reception ===
The play was considered shocking when it was produced, with reports of audience members walking out and even fainting. One fainting occurred when Ridley was in the audience, leading to discussions of whether a nurse should be present in the theatre for each performance.

Many reviewers praised the play's acting and direction, but were critical of Ridley's script. Some felt it was purposely trying to be repulsive. Critic Maureen Paton described it as "ludicrously bad" and a "repugnant tiresome story… Mr. Ridley’s Grimm obsessions are in the worst possible taste", concluding that "This pointless wallow makes Marat-Sade seem like Pontins Holiday Camp." Melanie McDonagh for The Evening Standard wrote, "Philip Ridley is simply the Fat Boy from the Pickwick Papers who sneaks up on old ladies and hisses 'I want to make your flesh creep'." For The Jewish Chronicle, David Nathan said, "To the Theatre of the Absurd, the Theatre of Comedy and the Operating Theatre, you can now add the Theatre of Yuk", and that "the arousal of disgust is as legitimate a dramatic objective as the arousal of any other strong emotion, but as an end in itself it seems pointless."

Some critics also felt that the play was derivative of other works, particular the early plays of Harold Pinter and the work of Jean Cocteau. City Limits critic Lyn Gardner wrote that the script was "derivative of some (more famous) playwrights' worst plays". Comparing the play's enigmatic quality to the work of Pinter, Maureen Paton wrote, "Where Pinter's ironic technique, like a two-way mirror, can give an intellectual patina to a mystery wrapped in an enigma, Ridley seems luridly self-indulgent… [He] drops various ominous hints that are never resolved, leaving the audience to wallow in the mire of pointless speculation."

Another recurring criticism was that the script was contrived and lacked explanations for its content. Lyn Gardner wrote that it had "no discernible internal logic, spewing imagery meaninglessly from nowhere… with long meandering monologues which… go nowhere and appear to have no dramatic impetus… [It has an] air of contrived weirdness when what is desperately needed is a sense of reality and some concrete explanations." Benedict Nightingale for The Times wrote that “the play's obscurities becom[e] irksome” but that "There is no obligation on a dramatist to explain his characters' behaviour. Perhaps it is enough for Ridley to cram his play with images of childhood guilt, confusion, self-hatred and dread, leaving the audience… to the dramatic Rorschach blot that emerges… Maybe Ridley will be more specific in his next play."

Despite these criticisms, the script received praise from some critics. An overwhelmingly positive review came from What's On's Catherine Wearing: "This is a world premiere you must rush to see… [Ridley] presents a world that is boldly dramatic, dead contemporary and sickeningly terrifying. At last, some new work for the theatre that has vision and bravery in its telling… There's a sinister and original mind at work here with lots to say… Dark powerful and choc a-bloc with shock tactics, this must be a must for anyone who wants dynamic, contemporary theatre."

Reacting to the reviews, Ian Herbert in Theatre Record wrote that there was "a most encouraging set of disagreements" amongst critics regarding The Pitchfork Disney. He defended the play, called it "a very important debut", compared Ridley's writing favourably to Harold Pinter's, and said that Ridley was a writer to watch out for: "He has a little to learn yet about dramatic structure and all the boring rules, but he can already create astonishingly original characters and give them lines that hold an audience spellbound."

Over its original run, it earned popularity with a predominantly young audience. Director Matthew Lloyd said that for its last two and a half weeks, the theatre "was absolutely rammed by, kind of, young people who were sort of drawn to it like a magnet […] Suddenly there were people rocking up at the Bush Theatre […] on word of mouth. […] They weren't kind of customary theatregoers but there was a buzz about it." By the end of its run, the play had acquired something of a cult following, with a group of actors reportedly seeing the production several times and attended the final performance wearing T-shirts with lines of dialogue from the play printed on them in bold lettering. It was so successful that, for the first time in its history, the Bush Theatre had to schedule an extra matinee performance to meet audience demand.

For his performance as Presley, Rupert Graves won the Charrington Fringe Award for Best Actor.

=== Legacy ===
Matthew Lloyd who directed the first production of The Pitchfork Disney has cited the play as marking a turning point in his career as a director. He has credited the response from the young audiences who saw the production for giving him the confidence to quit his job as literary-manager of the Hampstead Theatre to instead concentrate on his career as a director: "I don't think I would be a director now, or I think it would have taken much, much longer to get a foothold without Phil[ip Ridley] and that particular play."

Years after its premiere The Pitchfork Disney grew in reputation, achieving recognition as a major work and highly influential in the development of in-yer-face theatre, which is a form of drama that characterised much new writing in British Theatre during the 1990s.

Bush Theatre artistic director Dominic Dromgoole wrote in 2000 that the play "took the expectations of a normal evening in the theatre, rolled them around a little, jollied them along, tickled their tummy, and then savagely, fucked them up the arse… Performed right at the beginning of 1990, this was one of the first plays to signal a new direction for new writing. No politics, no naturalism, no journalism, no issues. In its place, character, imagination, wit, sexuality, skin and the soul."

Playwright and theatre academic Dan Rebellato claims that he saw the play at least four times during the initial run in 1991 and has described the experience of watching it as "a thrilling, bracing shock" as it "overturned my ideas about British theatre". In his analysis of The Pitchfork Disney, Rebellato has stated that "The play was startling on its first appearance for its immense theatrical confidence and its lack of an explicitly moral authorial voice, two qualities that seemed, when it opened on 2 January 1991, contradictory. […] The Pitchfork Disney, more than any other play, marks the transition from the political conventions of 1980s theatre to the profound ambiguities of the 1990s."

Critic and leading expert on In-yer-face theatre, Aleks Sierz, has cited the play as a pioneering work. In his introduction to the Methuen Classics edition of the play-text, Sierz wrote "The Pitchfork Disney is not only a key play of the 90s; it is the key play of that decade... Its legend grew and grew until it became the pivotal influence on the generation of playwrights that followed. It is a foundation text; it separates then from now." Sierz credits the play with introducing "a totally new sensibility into British theatre [that] signalled a fresh direction for contemporary playwrighting: one that eschewed realistic naturalism, political ideology and social commentary, and turned auditorium's into cauldron's of sensation", adding that the play was "an agenda setting work: the era of experiential theatre began here".

Despite the play being credited for instigating in-yer-face theatre, Ridley has spoken about how he feels that The Pitchfork Disney (along with his other plays in the so-called "East End Gothic Trilogy") were produced before in-yer-face theatre happened: "I had done my first three plays… by 1994 and that’s the year that most people say the ‘in your face’ thing started. All those seeds were laid before that, but it didn't feel that I was doing that and no one said I was doing that until many years after the event." "When in-yer-face was happening I was writing plays for young people."

Significant plays that critics believe have been influenced by or bear homage to the play include:

- Penetrator by Anthony Neilson (1993)
- Blasted by Sarah Kane (1995)
- Mojo by Jez Butterworth (1995)
- Shopping and Fucking by Mark Ravenhill (1996)
- Been So Long by Ché Walker (1998)
- Dirty Butterfly by debbie tucker green (2003)
- Debris by Dennis Kelly (2003)
- The Pillowman by Martin McDonagh (2003)
- Three Birds by Janice Okoh (2013)

Monologues from the play have also become popular audition pieces, most notably Presley's speech about killing a snake in a frying pan and Hayley's speech about being chased into a church by savage dogs.

== Notable productions ==
World Premiere (London, 1991)

2 January 1991 at The Bush Theatre, London.
Directed by Matthew Lloyd.

- Presly Stray - Rupert Graves
- Haley Stray - Tilly Vosburgh
- Cosmo Disney - Dominic Keating
- Pitchfork Cavalier - Stuart Raynor

Glasgow Revival (1993)

Citizens' Theatre, Glasgow.
Directed by Malcolm Sutherland.

- Presly Stray - Michael Matus
- Haley Stray - Helen Baxendale
- Cosmo Disney - Matthew Wait
- Pitchfork Cavalier - Ché Walker

American Premiere (Washington D.C., 1995)

5 February 1995 at the Woolly Mammoth Theatre Company, Washington D.C.
Directed by Rob Bundy.

- Presly Stray - Wallace Acton
- Haley Stray - Mary Teresa Fortuna
- Cosmo Disney - Michael Russotto
- Pitchfork Cavalier - Bill Delaney

Winner of ‘Outstanding resident play’ and ‘Outstanding lead actor, resident play’ for Wallace Acton at the Helen Hayes Awards, with nominations also for ‘Outstanding Supporting actress, resident play’ for Mary Teresa Fortuna, ‘Outstanding Director, resident play’ for Rob Bundy, ‘Outstanding Set Design, resident play or musical’ for James Kronzer and ‘Outstanding Sound Design, resident play or musical’ for Daniel Schrader.

Bolton Revival (1997)

January 16, 1997 at the Octagon Theatre, Bolton.
Directed by Lawrence Till.

- Presley - Matthew Vaughan
- Hayley - Andrea Ellis
- Cosmo - Gideon Turner
- Pitchfork – David Hollett

New York Premiere (1999)

8 April 1999 at Blue Light Theater Company, New York.
Directed by Rob Bundy.

- Presly Stray - Alex Drape
- Haley Stray - Lynn Hawley
- Cosmo Disney - Alex Kilgore
- Pitchfork Cavalier - Brandt Johnson

London Revival 2012 (21st Anniversary Production)

25 January - 17 March 2012 at The Arcola Theatre, London.
Directed by Edward Dick.

- Presly Stray - Chris New
- Haley Stray - Mariah Gale
- Cosmo Disney - Nathan Stewart-Jarrett
- Pitchfork Cavalier - Stefano Fregni AKA Steve Guadino

London Revival 2017

27 January - 18 March 2017 at Shoreditch Town Hall, London.
Directed by Jamie Lloyd.

- Presly Stray - George Blagden
- Haley Stray - Hayley Squires
- Cosmo Disney - Tom Rhys Harries
- Pitchfork Cavalier - Seun Shotes

Tom Rhys Harries received the 2018 Offie for 'Best Supporting Male in a Play'. Also nominated were George Blagden for ‘Best Male in a Play’ (longlisted) and Jamie Lloyd for ‘Best Director’ (longlisted).
