= Shivered (play) =

2012 play by Philip Ridley

- Cover of the published play-text, featuring imagery created by Philip Ridley.
- Original language: English
- Written by: Philip Ridley
- Characters: Alec (Male); Ryan (Male); Jack (Male); Lyn (Female); Gordy (Male); Evie (Female); Mickey (Male)

Premiere
- Date: 7 March 2012
- Place: The Southwark Playhouse, London

Shivered is a two act play by Philip Ridley. His ninth stage play for adults, it premiered in 2012 at the Southwark Playhouse.

Utilising a nonlinear structure the play weaves together the stories of two families living in the fictional new-town of Draylingstowe in Essex, with a plot that spans approximately twelve years.

Described by some critics as a ‘state of the nation play’ Ridley has instead called Shivered “more of a dream state of the nation play”.

== Structure and Setting ==
The play consists of 17 scenes which are presented out of order. This is particularly unique for Ridley as the majority of his plays adhere mostly to Aristotle's unities of drama, where the play's action takes place in one location and spans out in real time. When interviewed about the play Ridley explained: “Something started to happen that scared me and excited me in equal measure in that I liked what I was doing but found it was telling a more interesting story when I started to break the narrative. And I thought: yes… chronologically is only one way to tell a story, and there’s another story waiting to be told here, which is to really deconstruct the whole story and just present these little fragments of it, and not only leave huge gaps between each fragment but then rearrange the fragments so that they tell another story.”

The play is also unusual for Ridley in that it's one of his few works that doesn't take place within the East End of London (one of his main sources of inspiration) but instead a small town in Essex. Explaining the play's setting Ridley said “I was creating this family that had moved out into a fictitious new-town in Essex (which I’m calling Dralingstowe) and I put them going there because a new car plant had opened when times were good at the beginning of the millennium… And there’s a wonderful sort of green mound beside a motorway that people go to, and I like that because it sort of had echoes of the green hills of England.”

== Reception ==
Michael Coveney, in his review for WhatsOnStage.com, commented: “It's easily the best play I've seen this year, a deeply poetic and imaginative piece about friendship, terror, sex and disability.” Critic Aleks Sierz gave the play five stars, writing in The Arts Desk “With its pacy writing, confident storytelling and imaginative panache, this is a thrilling and disturbing new play that is unafraid to look into the abyss. One of Ridley’s very best.” Positive reviews also came from The Independent, TimeOut, The Telegraph, and Neil Dowden of WhatsOnStage.com who all awarded the play four stars. Playwright Mark Ravenhill, wrote on his Twitter page “EVERYONE. Go see Philip Ridley’s Shivered at Southwark Playhouse if you can. A unique, pertinent, significant play by a major playwright.”

Kate Kellaway of The Observer wrote “I disliked this bleak, attention-seeking play so intensely that it must be an inverted compliment to its power,” criticising the characters for being unmoving and Ridley for “wackily throw[ing] in a monster, a clairvoyant and UFOs – the supernatural further debilitating credibility.” Kate Bassett's review for The Independent stated that the script was “like several hamfisted plays jammed into one” and that the dialogue was “unconvincing.” The Independent's Paul Taylor, felt that some reviewers had misunderstood Ridley due to his supposed reputation of producing “provocative” work: “It is not Ridley who is desensitised; it is his attackers in their fixed and laminated indignation. They fail to take on board the generosity of spirit that impels his plays.” Michael Coveney felt that some critics had missed the cathartic nature of the story and compared Ridley's writing to that of John Webster: “Ridley is in some respects the most Jacobean dramatist we have these days, toying with our tarnished sensibilities and vile instincts to such an extent that one or two reviewers have felt dirty and seriously demeaned while watching his new play.”

Regarding Ridley utilising a non-linear narrative, a number of critics believed that the play's disjointed form reflected the feelings of the characters. Others also saw it as highlighting the play's themes, such as Neil Dowden: “As its title suggest, Shivered is about fragmentation, we see the break-up of families, friendships and community, as well as the shattering of certainties between reality and fantasy.” Michael Coveney praised the narrative device writing “[It’s] the kind of daring formal experiment we see far too little of these days, and one that is here deployed with nothing short of absolute mastery.”

Stewart Pringle for Exeunt Magazine wrote at length of his mixed feelings because of the format, stating that Ridley's “ideas are potent, and they are brilliantly worked in the play’s best moments, but their failure to cohere, however intentional, leaves Shivered an often frustrating whole... an emphasis on disjunction rather than harmony, numbing the dramatic tension.” Despite this, he wrote that some of the scenes “are so skilfully wrought that you have to hold back the urge to applaud on the spot” but concluded “when the play finally closes there is a nagging emptiness, a disappointment. Not so much less than the sum of its parts and more a refusal to sum them, Shivered never quite adds up.” Some critics also felt that the second act was much weaker than the first, with A Younger Theatre reviewer Jack Orr writing “Ridley seems compelled to tie up the loose ends of narratives rather than to offer us the inner guts of his characters as initially promised” concluding his review: “A cracking first half act that falls lifelessly limp by the second.”

== Awards ==
Year	Award Ceremony	Category	Recipient	Result
2012	The Offies	Best Male Performance	Josh Williams	Longlisted
2012	The Offies	Best New Play	Philip Ridley	Shortlisted
2012	The Offies	Best Director	Russel Bolam	Longlisted
2012	The Offies	Best Production	Shivered	Longlisted
2012	Evening Standard Theatre Awards	Milton Shulman Award for Outstanding Newcomer	Josh Williams	Longlisted

== Notable productions ==
Premiere

7 March 2012 at The Southwark Playhouse Theatre, London.
Directed by Russell Bolam.

- Alec - Robbie Jarvis
- Ryan - Joseph Drake
- Jack - Josh Williams
- Lyn - Olivia Poulet
- Gordy - Andrew Hawley
- Evie - Amanda Daniels
- Mikey - Simon Lenagan
