= Peter Robbins =

Peter Robbins may refer to:

- Peter Robbins (actor) (1956–2022), American child actor
- Peter Robbins (author) (born 1946), British author
- Peter Robbins (rugby union) (1933–1987), England rugby union player
- Pete Robbins (born 1978), American saxophonist and composer
