= Jade Williams (actress) =

English actress (born 1984)

- Born: 2 October 1984 (age 42); London, England
- Occupation: Actress
- Years active: 1995–present

Jade Williams (born 2 October 1984) is an English actress.

== Early life ==
Williams was born and in London, England in 1984 to Shelley and Mick Williams, a postman. She is the first of three children; her sister is Candice and her brother is Adam. Williams attended St. John's Infant School and later St. Mary's Primary School before winning a scholarship to the Sylvia Young Theatre School, for which she began attending at the age of eight.

== Career ==
Williams made her debut to television in 1995 when she appeared in Black Hearts in Battersea, a television adaptation of the children's novel of the same name by Joan Aiken. The series last six episodes and co-starred Celia Imrie. She is perhaps best known for her regular role as Zoe Stringer in the BBC series Grange Hill and recurring one as Gemma Foster in Casualty, and the ITV prison drama Bad Girls, in which she played the role of Rhiannon Dawson, the daughter of prisoner Julie Johnston (Kika Mirylees); appearing for the first time in series two, Rhiannon and her brother Martin arrive at the prison to visit their long lost mother, Julie. Rhiannon returns in series four when she is imprisoned for shoplifting and assault.

In 2000, Williams appeared in the mini-series The Sins. In 2001, she was cast in the television mini-series Anne Frank: The Whole Story, which was based on the book Anne Frank: The Biography by Melissa Müller. Williams had minor role in The Canterbury Tales, a 2003 BBC mini-series modern adaptation from the 14th century Canterbury Tales by Geoffrey Chaucer.

She has received guest roles in a number of television series including The Adventures of Paddington Bear, Portlands, Hope and Glory, which starred Lenny Henry and Amanda Redman, Being April, with Pauline Quirk, police drama The Bill, Doctors, Serious and Organised, Sky1 series Mile High, William and Mary, with Julie Graham and Martin Clunes, Judge John Deed, the flash-back episode of BBC soap opera EastEnders, which aired in 2005, Holby City and DCI Banks. Her most recent performance is in the BBC series Doctor Foster, as a captivating waitress, with the famous quote of "here's your water"

Williams' film credits include Anything's Possible, which featured Steven Webb, another guest character of drama series Bad Girls; Life and Lyrics, Hush Your Mouth, and Doctor Faustus. In 2003 she starred in the television film Lloyd & Hill.

Williams is a well-known theatre actress, having been cast in a number of productions such as The William Shakespeare plays Romeo and Juliet, As You Like It, King Lear and Henry IV, Part 1 & Part 2; Piranha Heights by Philip Ridley; The Little Prince, which is based on the book by Antoine de Saint-Exupéry; Palace of the End by Judith Thompson; and Doctor Faustus by Christopher Marlowe.

She has played many voice characters for radio plays which have been broadcast on channels including BBC Radio 4.

== Filmography ==
- Black Hearts in Battersea – Dido Twait (6 episodes; 1995)
- The Adventures of Paddington Bear – Judy (television series; 1997)
- Plotlands – Joan Marsh (television series; 1997)
- Anything's Possible – Reece (1999)
- Grange Hill – Zoe Stringer (20 episodes; 1998–1999)
- Casualty – Gemma Foster (4 episodes; 2000)
- Hope and Glory – Chloe McConnell (1 episode; 2000)
- The Sins – Beth (television mini-series – 1 episode; 2000)
- Anne Frank: The Whole Story – Hannah "Hannalei" Goslar (television mini-series; 2001)
- Bad Girls – Rhiannon Dawson (5 episodes; 2000–2002)
- Being April – Martha (4 episodes; 2002)
- The Bill – Vicki Casson (2 episodes; 2002)
- Serious & Organised – Nadia (television series; 2003)
- Lloyd & Hill – Hannah Ouspensky (television film; 2003)
- Mile High – Gemma (1 episode; 2003)
- William and Mary – Paula (1 episode; 2003)
- Canterbury Tales – Amy Healey (television mini-series – 1 episode; 2003)
- Judge John Deed – Kate Rogers (1 episode; 2005)
- EastEnders – Madge (1 episode; 2005)
- Life and Lyrics – Lady Gees (2006)
- Hush Your Mouth – Patricia (2007)
- Stolen Youth – The Girl (short film; 2008)
- Holby City – Esme Kennedy (1 episode; 2008)
- DCI Banks – Gerry Siddons (2 episodes; 2011)
- Doctors – Angela Prior (1 episode; 2003); Alison Caloway (1 episode; 2008); Helen Callaway (3 episodes; 2012)
- Doctor Faustus (2012)
- EastEnders – Nurse Anya Barowski (2016)

== Theatre ==
- The Dark of the Moon – Puff – King's Head Theatre
- Legacy – Roishin – Soho Theatre
- 'Low Dat – Donna – Birmingham Repertory Theatre
- The Rise & Fall of Little Voice – Little Voice – Harrogate Theatre
- Market Boy' – Girl – National Theatre
- I Like Mine With a Kiss – Freya – Bush Theatre
- Chatroom/Citizenship – Eva/Kerry – National Theatre/Hong Kong Arts Festival
- Piranha Heights – Soho Theatre
- Romeo and Juliet – Juliet – Shakespeare Globe Theatre/UK tour
- The Little Prince – Little Prince – Hamstead Theatre
- A New World – Philly – Shakespeare Globe Theatre
- As You Like It – Phoebe – Shakespeare Globe Theatre
- Shraddha – Pearl Penfold – Soho Theatre
- Henry IV, Part 1 – Doll Tearsheet/Lady Mortimer – Shakespeare Globe Theatre
- Henry IV, Part 2 – Doll Tearsheet/Lady Mortimer – Shakespeare Globe Theatre
- Bedlam – Shakespeare Globe
- In Basildon – Shelley – Royal Court Theatre
- Palace of the End – Lynndie – Arcola Theatre
- God of Soho – Teresa – Shakespeare Globe Theatre
- Doctor Faustus – Duchess of Vanholt/Sin – Shakespeare Globe Theatre
- Sons Without Fathers – Maria – Belgrade Theatre/Arcola Theatre

== Radio ==
- Westway – Jessica Boyce (BBC World Service)
- The Day the Planes Came – Polly (BBC Radio 4)
- What Is She Doing Here? – Antigone (BBC Radio 4)
- Arcadia – Thomasina (BBC Radio 4)
- The Birds – Maggie (BBC Radio 4)
- The Family Man – Isobel (BBC Radio 4)
- The Mother of... – Libby (BBC Radio 4)
- The Third Trial – Jeannie (BBC Radio 4)
- Secrets – Treasure/India (BBC World Service)
- The Chronicles of Narnia – Jill Pole (NS Radio)
- Needle – Edith (BBC World Service)
- Marnie – Marnie (BBC World Service/BBC Radio 4)
- The Gate of Angels – Daisy Saunders (BBC Radio 4)
- Five Wedding Dresses – The Rescue – Charlene (BBC World Service)
