= Flamingoes in Orbit =

Collection of short stories by Philip Ridley

- Jacket cover illustrated by Sarah Ball of the book's first edition
- Author: Philip Ridley
- Cover artist: Sarah Ball
- Language: English
- Genre: Short story collection
- Publisher: Hamish Hamilton
- Publication date: 1990
- Publication place: United Kingdom
- Media type: Print (hardcover)
- Pages: 182
- ISBN: 0-241-12922-2

Flamingoes in Orbit is a collection of short stories by Philip Ridley. It was first published in the United Kingdom by Hamish Hamilton ltd in 1990. It was Ridley's third literary work for adults after his 1988 novella Crocodilia and his 1989 novel In The Eyes of Mr Fury.

In 2015 publisher Valancourt Books announced plans to republish Flamingoes in Orbit, along with Ridley's previously published gay themed literature for adults. This new edition of the book was released on 26 June 2018.

The two versions of the book are significantly different, with many of the stories being rewritten and some renamed in the 2018 edition. The newer version also adds two new stories to the collection, but omits five stories from the first edition.

== Stories ==
=== First edition ===
The first edition of the book is composed of 13 short stories, with the title story first:

- "Flamingoes in Orbit"
- "The Turbulence of Butterfly Wings"
- "Embracing Verdi"
- "Pins"
- "Towers of Belief"
- "What We Care to Remember"
- "The Fear of Hyacinths"
- "A Shoe Three Inches Big"
- "Leviathan"
- "What's Here"
- "Rattlesnake"
- "Go"
- "The Barbaric Continuity"

=== Fully revised edition (2018) ===
Flamingoes in Orbit
- Cover designed by Henry Petrides of the fully revised edition of the book published in 2018
- Author: Philip Ridley
- Cover artist: Henry Petrides
- Language: English
- Genre: Short story collection
- Publisher: Valancourt Books
- Publication date: 2018
- Publication place: United States
- Media type: Print (hardback & paperback), e-book
- Pages: 278
- ISBN: 978-1-948405-04-1 (hardback) 978-1-948405-05-8 (trade paperback)

The 2018 edition of the book is composed of ten short stories:

- "The Tooth of Troy Flamingo" (originally named "Flamingoes in Orbit" in the first edition)
- "Pins"
- "A Shoe Three Inches Big"
- "The Fear of Hyacinths"
- "Embracing Verdi"
- "Alien Heart"
- "Towers of Belief"
- "Leviathan"
- "Another Story" (highly reworked version of "The Barbaric Continuity" from the first edition)
- "Wonderful Insect"

== Previously published stories ==
Before the publication of the first edition of the collection, two of Ridley's stories had already appeared in other anthologies. "Embracing Verdi" appeared in the collection Oranges and lemons: stories by gay men (edited by David Rees and Peter Robbins) in 1987, and "Leviathan" was featured in the collection 20 Under 35: Original Stories by Britain's Best New Young Writers (edited by Peter Straus) in 1988.

For the 2018 edition, two further stories were added to the collection that had been previously published. "Alien Heart" was included in Projections 4½ (edited by John Boorman and Walter Donohue) in 1995. "Wonderful Insect" has been reported to have been previously published elsewhere, and a significant part of the story is featured in Ridley's semi-autobiographical prose "Introduction" of his second collection of plays for adults, Philip Ridley Plays: 2, which was published in 2009.
