= The Fastest Clock in the Universe =

Play written by Philip Ridley

- Poster advertising the 2013 London revival of The Fastest Clock in the Universe at the Old Red Lion Theatre
- Original language: English
- Written by: Philip Ridley
- Characters: Three male and two female
- Genre: In-yer-face theatre, black comedy
- Setting: "A dilapidated room above an abandoned factory in the East End of London"

Premiere
- Date: 14 May 1992
- Place: Hampstead Theatre, London

The Fastest Clock in the Universe is a two act play by Philip Ridley. It was his second stage play and premiered at the Hampstead Theatre, London on 14 May 1992 and featured Jude Law in his first paid theatre role, playing the part of Foxtrot Darling. The production was the second collaboration between Ridley and director Matthew Lloyd, who went on to direct the original productions for the majority of Ridley's plays until 2001.

Like Ridley's previous play The Pitchfork Disney, The Fastest Clock was considered by some critics as shocking for its time. Nevertheless the play was a major success, winning a variety of awards.

The play is the second entry in Ridley's unofficially titled "East End Gothic Trilogy", preceded by The Pitchfork Disney and followed by Ghost from a Perfect Place. Although initially receiving a generally divisive response from critics these plays have grown in reputation and have been recognised as major works in the development of in-yer-face theatre which radically characterised new writing in British theatre during the 1990s.

== Story ==
In a flat above an abandoned fur factory in the East End of London lives Cougar Glass. He is thirty years old and obsessed with his self-image, doing all he can to appear young. He lives with his partner Captain Tock who he often makes wait on him, much to the Captain's dismay. As Cougar has an intense fear of ageing he regularly holds birthday parties where he pretends to be only nineteen years of age. He also uses these parties to invite young people whom he has falsely befriended to his flat, to seduce (and possibly even murder) them for his own pleasure. The victim of today's party is Foxtrot Darling, a 15 year-old schoolboy who Cougar has manipulated by becoming a new role model for him in wake of his brother's death. However, when Foxtrot arrives he has unexpectedly brought along Sherbet Gravel, a streetwise 17 year-old girl who is planning to become Foxtrot's wife and claims to be pregnant with his child. As the play progresses the atmosphere gradually intensifies as Sherbet takes control of the party, aware that Cougar is not what he appears to be.

== Characters ==
Cougar Glass – A thirty year old man, he appears to be very narcissistic, caring little about others and instead being fixated with his own appearance. He also becomes hysterical and feels physically ill whenever he is reminded of his real age.

Captain Tock – A heavily balding 49 year old man. He has a job running an antique shop and has an obsession with birds. He is very wary of his health, taking vitamins and refraining from eating unhealthy food.

Foxtrot Darling – A 15 year-old school child. He has found a new role model in Cougar after the loss of his brother.

Sherbet Gravel – A streetwise 17 year old girl. She originally was the girlfriend of Foxtrot's brother until his death. She since has become Foxtrot's girlfriend and now yearns to have a more normal life, having previously been involved with gangs.

Cheetah Bee – 88 years of age, she is the landlady as her husband owned the fur factory below years before. Whenever Cougar gets distressed from being reminded of his real age she arrives and coaxes him by showing how old and unattractive she is by comparison.

=== Meaning behind the names of the characters ===
Ridley has explained the meaning behind the characters' names saying that "all the names in the play can be read as kind of like nicknames" and that the "names are very true for me. You just have to 'unlock' them a little bit. So, on the surface of it, the name Cougar Glass may seem a bit...extreme. But 'Cougar' is quite clearly a nick-name, a reflection of the character's predatory sexual nature." "I doubt whether he was christened 'Cougar' […] And actually I wrote the play before 'Cougar' was used as kind of as a term for predatory kind of elder women […] I was thinking of it like that but it wasn't in common parlance [as] the word 'Cougar' wasn't used at that time". "[With] Cheetah B...well, I think she got it because of her love of fur. Maybe she never actually wore a coat made of cheetah skin, but she could have done. Or perhaps yearned for one. Either way, as the wife of a furrier, the name stuck. […] East London council estates are full of fifteen year old mothers calling their babies 'Kitten' and 'Tinsel' and 'Honeysuckle', so I don't find it bizarre at all that Sherbet ended up with a name like that at all. And 'Foxtrot' – that's what he uses on the Internet. F for...Foxtrot. So his real name, whatever it might be, begins with 'F' and has become Foxtrot. And as for Captain Tock – well, I think that's the name of his shop."

== Development ==
Ridley has stated that he had already started formulating ideas for The Fastest Clock in the Universe during the original production of his previous play The Pitchfork Disney.

Ridley has said that he was partially inspired in writing the play by what he felt at the time was "[a new] kind of male vanity that was really coming to the foreground... where men were beginning to... promote themselves as sexual objects... Men were kind of almost like saying 'We can have it all now... We can have the girls fancying us and we can have men fancying us. We can have just whatever we like.' There was this kind of strange... polysexuality that was kind of running through everything... That as a kind of character thing fascinated me... This kind of cult of physical perfection was something that I thought had... something that was really theatrical." Ridley particularly was intrigued by how this new form of masculinity he observed contrasted to how his father's generation perceived masculinity.

Ridley has acknowledged that the play was partially influenced by the work of Joe Orton. Another influence was Oscar Wilde's The Picture of Dorian Gray, with a stage version of Wilde's story being the last production that Ridley had directed while a student at St Martins School of Art. In 2013 Ridley stated that he initially was "not conscious" of these influences while composing the play but that "looking back and reading the play now, I can see Dorian Gray and Orton running through it like… Brighton through a stick of rock. It's kind of there all the way through." He also has stated that the recurring imagery of birds was influenced by the artist Max Ernst, particularly "those kind of Victorian collages that he did with kind of women with bird's heads. And he was using birds there as a symbol of sexual suppression, of showing no sexual emotion at all." Other influences were Alfred Hitchcock, Francis Bacon, Jacobean theatre, and Brian De Palma's film adaptation of Stephen King's Carrie, with Ridley saying "what [the play] shares with Carrie... is that you sort of know where it's heading. You know... that it's going to end with blood... So how it's going to end is not really what this play is about. It's the journey it's going to take to get there".

Regarding the play's numerous influences Ridley has said "It's the only play in which I've done... [where] the play itself is like this junk shop... in which all the kind of scrapbook ideas I've been playing around with have been thrown in... It's almost like I could do an annotated version of the script [where] every line would have a little asterisk by it... connecting it to something else... of where this idea came from... It's the only play in which I've consciously done that, but all these references [and] allusions to other things it's making... is part of that kind of shimmering kaleidoscop[ic] idea on top of idea world that it is."

Ridley dedicated the play to his friend and fellow visual artist Dominic Vianney Murphy who studied with him at St Martins School of Art.

== Reception and legacy ==
=== Initial reception ===
For its premiere production The Fastest Clock in the Universe generally received positive reviews for its acting and direction but was met with more varied critical response for its writing.

"I think it was seen [by critics] as something that was outrageous and it was… the outrage of it that they reacted to. That they were outraged by it, that they were irritated by it."

— Philip Ridley, interview on TheatreVoice

Some critics (like with Ridley's previous drama The Pitchfork Disney) felt that the play was excessively harsh and gruesome. The Times's critic Benedict Nightingale wrote that "To say that Philip Ridley has a bilious imagination is to understate the intensity of the affliction. A sickbag should be kept in the wings, ready to catch the ugly imagery his characters sporadically throw up." Writing for The Independent, Rhoda Koenig commented that the play's "explicit descriptions of animal torture transgress the limits of the bearable" and that the play's climax was "shocking without being moving". Sunday Times's critic John Peter wrote that The Fastest Clock was "a sadistic and boring little play which should never have been put on."

Despite these criticisms Ridley's writing drew praise from various critics. Michael Billington declared that "The Fastest Clock in The Universe is much the best new play Hampstead Theatre has discovered in a long while… A play of such talented oddness." Kate Kellaway wrote that "You scarcely notice time pass at Hampstead Theatre… Philip Ridley is a marvellous writer… His talents are perfectly suited to the theatre. The form of The Fastest Clock in the Universe is admirable; Ridley has an exact sense of timing; there is no slack writing." Rhoda Koenig commented that "Ridley expertly conveys the humour and tension of this wretched gathering", with similar praise coming from John Gross "there can be no denying [Ridley's] comic gift" and Time Out's James Christopher "Ridley displays a masterful handling of psychological tension… Nasty gripping stuff." Despite feeling that the play "is not quite as special as Pitchfork Disney" Ian Herbert of Theatre Record wrote that "it shows Ridley to be more than a one-hit wonder, a distinctive, disturbing voice that effortlessly mixes guignol and gags. It is a pleasure to spend time in Mr Ridley's weird world."

Ian Shuttleworth, in his review for City Limits, recognised that the play could grow to be an influential work, writing that the play was "Worth investigating, but less for the spasmodic glitter of the play itself than for the continuing intimations of what may well be to come."

=== Legacy ===
Despite the varied critical reviews the play won awards: Ridley was made recipient of both the Evening Standard and the Critics' Circle awards for 'most promising playwright'. The play was one of the winners of the 7th annual Time Out fringe awards. Ridley also received The Meyer-Whitworth Award, for which the playwright David Hare in his introduction at the prize giving ceremony described the play as "an absorbing, very funny play which shows great promise of a fast developing new stage writing talent".

The director Sam Mendes cited the play as being among his favourite theatre productions he had seen in 1992, saying that "I thought Philip Ridley's The Fastest Clock in the Universe… was outstanding".

An extract from the play was featured in the book Live 3: Critical Mass, which was published in 1996. The book is a compilation of extracts from various plays, "bringing together a wide variety of contemporary theatre texts by some of the emerging authors who are helping to reshape the nature of British theatre."

The Fastest Clock in the Universe (along with Ridley's other plays in his so-called "East End Gothic Trilogy") grew in reputation years after its initial premiere as an important work in the development of in-yer-face theatre.

In 2009 the Hampstead Theatre revived the play as part of their 50th anniversary celebrations where it was advertised as being "now regarded as a contemporary classic". In his review of the revival, Metro critic Robert Shore wrote "It was Philip Ridley who, perhaps more than any other playwright, launched the visceral 1990s in-yer-face theatre movement, and it was this award-winning play, written in his signature 'barbaric beauty' style and premiered at Hampstead in 1992, that got the ball rolling."

The play was featured in a list of 100 of the "best and most influential plays" performed in Britain 1945–2010 in the book Played in Britain: Modern Theatre in 100 Plays. The book was written by Kate Dorney and Frances Gray in collaboration with the Victoria and Albert Museum and was also made into an iPad app that was released in 2012. Both featured a short examination of The Fastest Clock in the Universe along with photographs of the play's premiere production.

The 2013 revival of the play at The Old Red Lion Theatre was filmed for the V&A's National Video Archive of Performance.

== Notable productions ==
World premiere (London, 1992)

14 May 1992 at Hampstead Theatre, London.

Directed by Mathew Lloyd.

- Cougar Glass – Con O'Neill
- Captain Tock – Jonathan Coy
- Foxtrot Darling – Jude Law
- Sherbert Gravel – Emma Amos
- Cheetah Bee – Elizabeth Bradley

American premiere (New York, Off-Broadway, 1998)

April 28 – May 23, 1998 at INTAR Theater, New York.

Performed by The New Group and directed by Jo Bonney.

- Cougar Glass – Bray Poor
- Captain Tock – David Cale
- Foxtrot Darling – Joey Kern
- Sherbert Gravel – Ellie Mae McNulty
- Cheetah Bee – Jeanette Landis

West Coast premiere (Celebration Theatre's 25th anniversary season)

October 12 – November 18, 2007 at Celebration Theatre, Los Angeles.

Directed by Lynn Ann Ann Bernatowicz.

- Cougar Glass – Justin Shilton
- Captain Tock – Christopher Snell
- Foxtrot Darling – Nick Endres
- Sherbert Gravel – Tuffet Schmelzle
- Cheetah Bee – Francesca Casale

Nominated for best 'Featured Actress in a Play' at the 2008 Ovation Awards for Francesca Casale's performance as Cheetah Bee.
Nominated for best 'Supporting Female Performance' at the 29th L.A. Weekly Theatre Awards for Tuffet Schmeltzle's performance as Sherbert Gravel.
Nominated for the best 'Performance in a (Primarily) Straight Play' at the 2008 Back Stage West Garland Awards for Francesca Casale's performance as Cheetah Bee.
Nominated for the best 'Scenic Design' at the 2008 Back Stage West Garland Awards for designer Casey Hayes.

2009 revival (Hampstead Theatre 50th anniversary celebrations)

22 September – 17 October 2009 at Hampstead Theatre, London.

21 October – 14 November Curve Theatre, Leicester.

Directed by Edward Dick.

- Cougar Glass – Alec Newman
- Captain Tock – Finbar Lynch
- Foxtrot Darling – Neet Mohan
- Sherbert Gravel – Jaime Winstone
- Cheetah Bee – Eileen Page

2013 London revival (21st anniversary production)

5–30 November 2013 at the Old Red Lion Theatre, London.

Presented by TREMers in association with Dréim Productions.

Directed by Tom O'Brien.

- Cougar Glass – Joshua Blake
- Captain Tock – Ian Houghton
- Foxtrot Darling – Dylan Llewellyn
- Sherbert Gravel – Nancy Sullivan
- Cheetah Bee – Ania Marson

== Awards ==
- 1993 – The Meyer-Whitworth Award
- 1992 – A Time Out Award
- 1992 – Critics' Circle Theatre Award for most promising playwright
- 1992 – Evening Standard Award for most promising playwright

== See also ==
- In-yer-face theatre
- Joe Orton
- The Birthday Party
