= Sparkleshark =

Play written by Philip Ridley

- Poster of 1999 National Theatre production. Designed by Fiona Richards and illustrated by Mark Longworth.
- Written by: Philip Ridley
- Characters: 6 Male and 3 Female
- Original language: English
- Series: The Storyteller Sequence
- Subject: Bullying, Fantasy, Storytelling
- Genre: Theatre for Young People
- Setting: "The rooftop of a tower block in the East End of London"

Sparkleshark is a stage play by Philip Ridley that was originally commissioned for the BTNational Connections, the UK National Theatre's youth theatre scheme in 1997. Sparkleshark had a professional run at the Royal National Theatre in 1999 followed by a tour in 2001.

The play is part of Ridley's sequence of plays for young people The Storyteller Sequence which share thematic similarities, the most distinct being the redemptive power of storytelling.

== Synopsis ==
High up on a tower block roof, Jake writes magical and fantastic stories in his secret book to hide from bullies. Polly finds Jake on the roof and realizes that there is more to him than what meets the eye. Natasha joins Polly and finds her talking to a 'geek' shortly followed by Carol and the rest of the bullies. When the gang of boys actually arrive, though, everyone's in for a great surprise. To save himself, Jake weaves his best story yet. It is so good that the gang drop their tough trendy act and demand starring roles in the unfolding fantasy of mystery, danger, love and the final encounter with Sparkleshark. Eventually, they make a pact to meet up every week as a group and tell stories together.

== Characters ==
All characters are in their mid-teens and all go to the same school, except for Shane who is in his late teens and left the school last year.

Jake – He is a highly imaginative and creative individual creating stories in a notebook. He however is often bullied by others and dismissed as a geek, resulting in him spending most his free time at school hiding between the bins.

Polly – She only joined school with the others last week. She has noticed Jake despite his secluded nature and loves his stories.

Natasha – She has looked after Polly in her first week at school coaching her into how to be popular. She has a troublesome relationship with her father and yearns for his attention.

Carol – She dresses in the same manner as Natasha suggesting she wants to attain to her popularity. She is attracted to Russell.

Russell – He is good-looking and knows it. He bullies Jake, often beating him up with Buzz and Speed.

Buzz and Speed – They are Russell's sidekicks.

Shane – He's already left school. He used to be Natasha's boyfriend.

Finn – Polly's brother. He is large and has limited speech and communicative skills but possess extreme strength for his age, which makes most of the other children fearful of him. They refer to him as “The Monster”.

== Notable Productions ==
Premiere

15 July 1997 at the Royal National Theatre, London. Directed by Michelle Wiggins and performed by the Youth Lyric Theatre, Belfast.

- Jake - Barum Jeffries
- Polly - Nadine Shaker
- Natasha - Tara Taylor
- Carol - Rachel Lyndsay
- Russell - Robert Davison
- Buzz - Gordon Barr
- Speed - John Gibson
- Shane - Conor Ritchie
- Finn - Jonathan Haveron

The show was awarded first prize at BT National Connections, receiving a notable standing ovation. Following the show, Ridley published a book of his short plays, citing each member of the Youth Lyric cast as a thank you to their work. The cast played the show for a further three years.

Among the admirers of the play's first production was the playwright Patrick Marber, who cited the drama as greatly influencing the writing of his 2004 play The Musicians, which like Sparkleshark was commissioned for The National Theatre Connections several years later in 2004. Marber described his viewing of Sparkleshark as "one of the best nights I've ever had in the theatre, and I thought, 'Oh, I'd love to write one of those one day.' I thought it was an absolutely beautiful play." and commented that "I suppose I ended up writing a piece that conveyed something of how I felt when I saw Sparkleshark - moved by seeing teenagers working together, because every time you open a newspaper, they're portrayed as violent, dysfunctional and dangerous."

Professional Premiere

7 June 1999 at the Royal National Theatre, London. Directed by Terry Johnson.

- Jake -Nitzan Sharron
- Polly - Jody Watson
- Natasha - Maggie Lloyd-Williams
- Carol - Kellie Bright
- Russell - Chiwetel Ejiofor
- Buzz - Nicholas Aaron
- Speed - Lee Oakes
- Shane - Paul Sharma
- Finn - Charlie J Watts

Since its debut Sparkleshark has had many productions around the world, including at the Australian Theatre for Young People.
