= Philip Ridley =

British writer, artist, and filmmaker (born 1964)

- Born: London, England
- Education: St Martins School of Art
- Occupations: Writer, artist, filmmaker

Philip Ridley is an English playwright, filmmaker, writer, and multi-disciplinary artist. He has produced works in a wide variety of mediums and genres, and has self-described as a "storyteller".

As a dramatist, he has been described as "a pioneer of In-yer-face theatre", which is a style and sensibility of drama that characterised many new plays that were performed in Britain during the 1990s. Ridley's debut play, The Pitchfork Disney (1991), is considered by many to be a seminal work that influenced the development of this form of theatre. One critic dubbed it "the key play" of the 1990s. He is also recognised for creating an ongoing series of plays for young people (The Storyteller Sequence).

As a visual artist he has been cited as a contemporary of the Young British Artists, and had his artwork exhibited internationally. In film, he is perhaps best known for his award-winning screenplay for the film, The Krays (1990), a biopic about the Kray twins which was directed by Peter Medak. As a filmmaker in his own right, he created a loose trilogy of horror films: The Reflecting Skin (1990), The Passion of Darkly Noon (1995) and Heartless (2009) for which he has acquired a cult following.

Ridley is also a novelist, songwriter, poet, photographer, performance artist, and has written drama for radio.

== Life and career ==
Ridley was born in Bethnal Green in the East End of London, where he lived and worked until moving to another part of East London, Ilford, in 2014. Ridley studied painting at Saint Martin's School of Art, and his work has been exhibited throughout Europe and Japan. Ridley is gay.

He started as both a performance artist and the creator of a long sequence of charcoal drawings called The Epic of Oracle Foster. One drawing from this sequence, "Corvus Cum", portraying a man ejaculating a black bird, was exhibited at the ICA in London while Ridley was still a student. With calls by some viewers for it to be displayed behind a curtain, it became a cause célèbre. Ridley also started his own theatre group as a student, acting in many of the productions, and made several short art films.

=== Writing ===
Ridley has written three books for adults: Crocodilia (1988), In the Eyes of Mr. Fury (1989), and Flamingoes in Orbit (1990).

His children's novels include Mercedes Ice (1989), Dakota of the White Flats (1989), Krindlekrax (1991) (winner of the Smarties Prize and the WH Smith Mind-Boggling Book Award), Meteorite Spoon (1994), Kasper in the Glitter (1994) (nominated for the Whitbread Prize), Scribbleboy (1997) (shortlisted for the Carnegie Medal), Zinderzunder (1998), Vinegar Street (2000), Mighty Fizz Chilla (2002) (shortlisted for the Blue Peter Book of the Year Award), and Zip's Apollo (2005). He also has written two short stories for younger children, Dreamboat Zing (1996) and The Hooligan's Shampoo (1996).

=== Film ===
After graduating from St Martin's, Ridley created the short film, Visiting Mr Beak (1987), which starred the veteran actor Guy Rolfe. The next year he created a short film for Channel 4 called The Universe of Dermot Finn (1988), which featured renowned actress Sheila Hancock and was officially selected for the Cannes Film Festival. A critical success there, it received theatrical distribution.

While still a student at St Martin's, Ridley wrote a screenplay for The Krays (1990), which was directed by Peter Medak and starred real-life brothers Gary Kemp and Martin Kemp. They had previously been recognised for their band, Spandau Ballet.

Ridley has also directed three feature films from his own screenplays: The Reflecting Skin (1990) (winner of 11 international awards), The Passion of Darkly Noon (1995) (winner of the Best Director Prize at the Porto Film Festival), and Heartless (2009).

Ridley's third film as writer-director, Heartless, premiered at the Frightfest horror film festival in London in August 2009. The film stars Jim Sturgess, Clémence Poésy, Noel Clarke, Eddie Marsan, Luke Treadaway, Ruth Sheen, and Timothy Spall, and was released in the UK in May 2010. It was the first mainstream British film to be released across all platforms (theatrical, DVD, Blu-ray, download) at the same time.

In 1996 Hungary's Titanic Film Festival had a retrospective of Ridley's work.

=== Theatre ===
Ridley has written many adult stage plays: the seminal The Pitchfork Disney (1990), the multi-award-winning The Fastest Clock in the Universe (1992), Ghost from a Perfect Place (1994), Vincent River (2000), the controversial Mercury Fur (2005), Leaves of Glass (2007), Piranha Heights (2008), Tender Napalm (2011), Shivered (2012), Dark Vanilla Jungle (2013), Radiant Vermin (2015), Tonight with Donny Stixx (2015), Karagula (2016), The Poltergeist (2020), Tarantula (2021), Copper Beeches, and In The Forest of Starlight and Shrapnel (2023).

Ridley has also written various monologues, many of which have been selectively performed together onstage. This includes Killer (consisting of the monologues Killer, Sledgehammers, and Vesper) performed in 2017, Angry (consisting of the monologues Angry, Okay, Bloodshot, Dancing, Now, and Air) performed in 2018, and The Beast Will Rise (consisting of the monologues Performance, Gators, Star, Rosewater, and Cactus) performed in 2020.

Ridley is additionally known for his series of plays for young people (known collectively as The Storyteller Sequence), consisting of Karamazoo (2004), Fairytaleheart (1998), Moonfleece (2004), Sparkleshark, and Brokenville (2003).

He has also written two plays for young children, Daffodil Scissors (2004) and Krindlekrax (2002) - a stage adaptation of his successful children's novel of the same name - as well as a play for the whole family, Feathers in the Snow (2012).

Ridley was one of 25 contemporary British writers asked to contribute a scene to NT25 Chain Play, celebrating 25 years of the Royal National Theatre in London.

=== Music ===
Ridley has written a wide range of songs, some of which have featured in his plays, films, and novels. As a student Ridley participated in music by creating work with a band called Haunted Staircase (who released their double-sided record Flutters in the early 1980s). He also worked as a DJ.

As a songwriter he has regularly collaborated with composer, Nick Bicât. For Ridley's film, The Passion of Darkly Noon, they created two songs: "Look What You've Done" (sung by Gavin Friday) and "Who Will Love Me Now?" (sung by PJ Harvey), the latter of which was voted as BBC Radio 1's Best Film Song of 1998. It was later covered by the techno/house band Sunscreem as Please Save Me, whose cover entered the UK top 40 chart, became a cult hit in clubs, and featured in the film South West 9. For his film Heartless, Ridley and Bicât created ten songs (performed by Mary Leay, Joe Echo, and lead actor Jim Sturgess).

In 2010 Ridley and Bicât formed the music group, 'Dreamskin Cradle' (with singer Mary Leay). The group's first album, Songs from Grimm (2014), consisted of twelve songs inspired by female characters in Brothers Grimm fairy tales; it was released on all major download sites. Some songs from the album were performed as part of a live performance called Grimm Tales, which was developed by the St Paul's Institute and featured readings by actress Jeany Spark, reflections from Canon Edmund Newell, and extracts from Brothers Grimm fairy tales adapted by poet laureate Carol Ann Duffy. Dreamskin Cradle have also released two singles: Fade and Float (written for Ridley's stage play, Tender Napalm) and Ladybird First (written for Ridley's stage play, Dark Vanilla Jungle).

Ridley also has written the libretto of an opera for teenagers titled Tarantula in Petrol Blue. With music composed by Anna Meredith, it had its premiere in 2009.

=== Other work ===
Ridley is a photographer, and his images have appeared on the covers of some of his published plays. He also has had photography exhibitions, mainly consisting of portraits of his friends and images of East London.

Ridley is also a poet. Some poetry has been published in anthologies, and he has earned a following for his ongoing series of performance poetry, Lovesongs for Extinct Creatures.

Ridley has won the Evening Standard awards for Most Promising Newcomer to British Film and Most Promising Playwright. He is the only person ever to receive both prizes.

He was featured on BBC2's arts programme, The Culture Show, on 2 March 2012.

Ridley dislikes his work being categorised by the medium in which it is told, often referring to the different genre pieces belonging to each other as "different peaks of the same mountain."

== List of works ==
=== Literature ===
Works for Adults

- 1986 – Embracing Verdi (short story)
- 1987 – Leviathan (short story)
- 1988 – Crocodilia (novel)
- 1989 – In the Eyes of Mr. Fury (novel, expanded version published in 2016)
- 1990 – Flamingoes in Orbit (short story collection, expanded version published in 2018)
- 1995 – Alien Heart (short story)
- 1997 – Introduction to Philip Ridley Plays: 1 (semi-autobiographical prose, extended and updated versions published in 2002 and 2012)
- 1998 – Wonderful Insect (short story)
- 2009 – Introduction to Philip Ridley Plays: 2 (semi-autobiographical prose)
- 2021 – Sunday (short story)

Works for Children

- 1989 – Mercedes Ice (novel)
- 1989 – Dakota of the White Flats (novel)
- 1991 – Krindlekrax (novel)
- 1994 – Meteorite Spoon (novel)
- 1995 – Kasper in the Glitter (novel)
- 1997 – Scribbleboy (novel)
- 1998 – Zinderzunder (novel)
- 2000 – Vinegar Street (novel)
- 2002 – Mighty Fizz Chilla (novel)
- 2005 – Zip's Apollo (novel)

Works for Younger Children

- 1996 – The Hooligan's Shampoo (short story)
- 1996 – Dreamboat Zing (short story)

=== Poetry ===
Ongoing performance sequence - Lovesongs for Extinct Creatures:

- Your Love
- Dark Sky Craving
- The Silver Hat
- I'm Waiting to be Killed
- The Seams

Performance sequence - Heartbeat on the Horizon:

- Press Conference
- After
- Flash Boom
- Shrapnel
- I Will

Miscellaneous poetry:

- The Dying Lizard Man
- Someone Wants to Kill Me Again
- Getting Through The Day
- The Prince and the Snail
- Waiting For Faces To Fall
- I Am The Boy
- Sparkling Cannibals

=== Theatre ===
Adult Stage Plays

- 1991 – The Pitchfork Disney
- 1992 – The Fastest Clock in the Universe
- 1994 – Ghost from a Perfect Place
- 2000 – Vincent River
- 2005 – Mercury Fur
- 2007 – Leaves of Glass
- 2008 – Piranha Heights
- 2011 – Tender Napalm
- 2012 – Shivered
- 2013 – Dark Vanilla Jungle
- 2015 – Radiant Vermin
- 2015 – Tonight with Donny Stixx
- 2016 – Karagula
- 2017 – The Beast of Blue Yonder
- 2020 – The Poltergeist
- 2021 – Tarantula
- 2023 – In The Forest of Starlight and Shrapnel
- 2024 – Copper Beeches

Libretto

- 2007 – On Such A Day (short operatic piece)
- 2009 – Tarantula in Petrol Blue (opera for teenagers)

Plays for Young People (The Storyteller Sequence)

- 1997 – Sparkleshark (professional premiere in 1999)
- 1998 – Fairytaleheart (also worked as the director of the original stage production)
- 2000 – Brokenville (performed earlier as a work-in-progress under the title Apocalyptica in 1998)
- 2004 – Moonfleece (professional premiere in 2010)
- 2004 – Karamazoo (monologue)

Play for the Whole Family

- 2012 – Feathers in the Snow

Plays for Children

- 2000 – Scribbleboy (adapted by Ridley from his children's novel of the same name. Play unproduced and script unpublished)
- 2002 – Krindlekrax (adapted by Ridley from his children's novel of the same name)
- 2004 – Daffodil Scissors

Monologues (sometimes performed as Live Art)

- 1986 – Vesper (first performed as a live art piece by Ridley in the Ten Painters Exhibition at St Martins School of Art)
- ???? – Bloodshot
- ???? – Angry
- ???? – Vooosh!
- ???? – Now
- ???? – Okay
- ???? – Wound
- ???? – It
- 2013 – Dark Vanilla Jungle
- 2015 – Tonight with Donny Stixx
- 2017 – Killer
- 2017 – Sledgehammers
- 2018 – Dancing

Monologues presented as theatre pieces:

- 2017 – Killer (a theatrical presentation of three monologues: Killer, Sledgehammers, and Vesper)
- 2018 – Angry (a theatrical presentation of six monologues: Angry, Okay, Bloodshot, Dancing, Now, and Air)
- 2020 – The Beast Will Rise (a theatrical presentation of five monologues: Performance, Gators, Star, Rosewater, and Cactus)
- 2020 – The Poltergeist
- 2021 – Tarantula

Online monologues:

- 2014 - Mercury Fur - New Monologues (Four monologues written by Ridley to promote The Greenhouse Theatre Company's production of Mercury Fur transferring to the West End: Elliot, Naz, Lola, Darren. Presented on The Greenhouse Theatre Company's YouTube channel.)
- 2020 - The Beast Will Rise (a series of monologues in response to Coronavirus performed by the cast of Ridley's postponed play The Beast of Blue Yonder: Gators, Zarabooshka, Chihuahua, Origami, Wound, Telescope, River, Eclipse, Performance, Star, Night, Puzzle, Snow, Rosewater, Cactus. Presented online at The Beast Will Rise (Tramp))

=== Radio plays ===
- 1989 – October Scars the Skin (script unpublished)
- 1989 – The Aquarium of Coincidences (script unpublished)
- 1991 – Shambolic Rainbow (script unpublished)

=== Film ===
Feature Films

- 1990 – The Krays (screenwriter)
- 1990 – The Reflecting Skin (director and screenwriter)
- 1995 – The Passion of Darkly Noon (director and screenwriter)
- 2010 – Heartless (director and screenwriter)

Short Films

- 1987 – Visiting Mr Beak (director and screenwriter)
- 1988 – The Universe of Dermot Finn (director and screenwriter)

=== Songs ===
As part of Dreamskin Cradle (with Nick Bicât)

2011 – From the stage play Tender Napalm

- Fade and Float (sung by Mary Leay)

2013 – From the stage play Dark Vanilla Jungle

- Ladybird First (sung by Mary Leay)

2014 – From the Album Songs from Grimm

- The Path You Know (sung by Mary Leay)
- Fearless (sung by Mary Leay)
- Waiting For You (sung by Mary Leay)
- Don't Call Me Magic (sung by Mary Leay)
- Not Here (sung by Mary Leay)
- Did That Just Happen (sung by Mary Leay)
- Things Will Change (sung by Mary Leay)
- Somewhere Something's Spinning (sung by Mary Leay)
- I Found You (Sung by Mary Leay)
- A Million Magic Things (sung by Mary Leay)
- Bring You Back (sung by Mary Leay)
- Tenderly Tender Me (sung by Mary Leay)

Songs in Cinematic Works

1995 – From the film The Passion of Darkly Noon (music Nick Bicât)

- Who Will Love Me Now? (sung by PJ Harvey)
- Look What You've Done (To My Skin) (sung by Gavin Friday)

2010 – From the film Heartless (music Nick Bicât)

- Heartless (sung by Jim Sturgess)
- This Is The World We Live In (sung by Joe Echo)
- What Skin Is All About (sung by Joe Echo)
- The Other Me (sung by Joe Echo)
- Lie to Me (sung by Joe Echo)
- It Must Be Somewhere (sung by Mary Leay)
- The Darker It Gets (sung by Joe Echo)
- In You Are All The Stories (sung by Joe Echo)
- Beautiful (sung by Joe Echoe)
- Phoenix in Dynamite Sky (sung by Joe Echo)

Other musical works

198? – From the record single Flutters (double sided record featuring Philip Ridley as part of the band Haunted Staircase)

- Side A: Flutters (A New Kind of Lovesong)
- Side B: Something for the Children (A New Kind of Lullaby)

2009 – Fin Like a Flower (music by Anna Meredith, sung by Michael Chance. On the album The NMC Songbook)

2009 – Songless (music by Anna Meredith. Premiered at the Twickenham Choral Society. Unreleased)

2010 – Heal You (music by Anna Meredith, sung by Juice Vocal Ensemble. Performed as part of Laid Bare: 10 love songs. Released as a single in 2014)

2016 – Love and Defection (Mix-tape made for The Voice of Cassandre, a French Radio show which invites international artists to create their own mix-tapes.)

=== Exhibitions ===
Group Shows

- 1981 – New Contemporaries, ICA, London.
- 1982 – New Contemporaries, ICA, London.
- 1983 – Christie's Student Show, Christie's, London.
- 1984 – The Leicester Exhibition, Leicester.
- 1985 – Open Drawing Exhibition, Tettenhall Gallery, Wolverhampton.
- 1985 – Open Exhibition, Lamont Gallery, London.
- 1986 – Ten Painters, 7th Floor Gallery, St. Martin's School of Art, London.
- 1986 – Summer Exhibition, Bernard Baron Gallery, London.
- 1987 – Group Show, Tom Allen Centre, London.
- 1987 – Selected Show, Lamont Gallery, London.
- 1987 – Young Contemporaries, Birch & Conran, London.
- 1988 – Decency, Discreetly Bizarre Gallery, London.
- 1988 – Selected Show, Lamont Gallery, London.
- 1988 – Mendacity, Discreetly Bizarre Gallery, London.
- 1988 – Magical Cats, Lamont Gallery, London.
- 1988 – Art Jonction International, Nice, France.
- 1988 – Bergamo Art Fair, Bergamo, Italy.
- 1996 – Freezeframe, Lamont Gallery, London.
- 2011 – Behind The Eyes, The Sassoon Gallery, London. (Photographic portraits. Behind The Eyes was a community arts project inspired by Ridley's play Mercury Fur)

Solo Shows

- 1985 – The Roaring Dreams Show, Tom Allen Centre, London.
- 1985 – The Feeling Landscapes Show, Bernard Baron Gallery, London.
- 1985 – The Glittering Gargolyes Show, The Fallen Angel, London.
- 1986 – Mermaids, Monsters and Sleeping Moons, Mermaid Theatre, London.
- 1986 – Recent Images, The Fallen Angel, London.
- 1986 – The Epic of Oracle Foster, Lamont Gallery, London.
- 1987 – Shy Moon, The Garden Gallery, London.
- 1989 – The Vinegar Blossoms, Lamont Gallery, London.
- 2007 – Recent Portraits, The Soho Theatre, London (photography exhibition)
- 2007 – East London, Trafalgar Studios, London (photography exhibition)
- 2008 – Recent Portraits 2, The Soho Theatre, London (photography exhibition)
- 2017 – Rebels and Rubble, Shoreditch Town Hall, London (mini photography exhibition)

== Selected works in anthologies ==
- 1987 – Short Story Embracing Verdi in the anthology Oranges and Lemons: Stories by Gay Men (edited by David Rees and Peter Robbins)
- 1988 – Short Story Leviathan in the anthology 20 Under 35: Original Stories by Britain's Best New Young Writers (edited by Peter Straus)
- 1995 – Short Story Alien Heart in Projections 4½ (edited by John Boorman and Walter Donohue)
- 1996 – Extract from The Fastest Clock in the Universe in the collection Live 3: Critical Mass (edited by David Tushingham)
- 1997 – Short Story Embracing Verdi in the anthology The Mammoth Book of Gay Short Stories (edited by Peter Burton)
- 1997 – Three poems: Someone Wants to Kill Me, The Seams and Getting Through the Day in The Bush Theatre Book (edited by Mike Bradwell)
- 2000 – Extract from Krindlekrax in the collection Out of this world
- 2003 – Poem The Silver Hat in the anthology Love (edited by Fiona Waters)
- 2005 – Poem The Prince and the Snail in the anthology The Works 4 (edited by Gaby Morgan)
- 2007 – Three poems: Dark Sky Craving, Waiting For Faces To Fall and I Am The Boy in the anthology Poems for the Retired Nihilist: Volume 2 (edited by Graham Bendel)
- 2009 – Monologue Vesper in Modern British Playwriting: The 1990s: Voices, Documents, New Interpretations (edited by Aleks Sierz)
- 2021 – Short story Sunday in ~~Main~~stream: An Anthology of Stories from the Edges (edited by Justin David and Nathan Evans)

== Derivative works ==
- In the British radio and TV comedy Little Britain, the character of Vicky Pollard comes from Darkley Noone council estates. This is named after Ridley's film The Passion of Darkly Noon.
- The music track The Light at the End (Effect) by industrial/noise rock duo Uniform (from their 2017 LP Wake in Fright) uses a dialogue excerpt from The Reflecting Skin.
- In 2011 the Schema Arts Collective used Ridley's 2005 play Mercury Fur as the basis for a community arts project called Behind the Eyes, which took place at the Sassoon Gallery, London. The project featured an amateur production of Mercury Fur, displayed artwork inspired by the play, and Ridley collaborated by exhibiting a series of photographic portraits he had created of the production's cast. A behind the scenes documentary about the project called Mercury Fur Unveiled was also made and later broadcast on the Community Channel in 2013. It is free to watch online.
- In 2007 performance pieces inspired by Ridley's semi-autobiographical Introduction to Philip Ridley Plays: 1 were presented by young directors under the title Gleaming Dark. This received a one-off performance at Trafalgar Studios in conjunction with the venue's revival of Ridley's play Vincent River.
- A quote from Ridley's children novel Dakota of the White Flats is used as the epigraph for chapter 6 of Cornelia Funke's young adult fantasy novel Inkspell.
- The German band Troy Flamingo are named after a character from one of Ridley's short stories.
- The American band Reflecting Skin is named after Ridley's film of the same name.
- Reece Nagra's remix of Buju Banton's song Murderer opens with an excerpt of dialogue from The Krays. It develops as a drum and bass anthem.
- Phil Western's 1998 album The Escapist features excerpts of dialogue from The Reflecting Skin.
- The song Fury Eyes (from the Creatures' second album, Boomerang) is dedicated to Ridley's novel In the Eyes of Mr. Fury.
- The song Troy Flamingo from Madonna Hip Hop Massaker's 1995 album Teenie Trap is based on the title story of Ridley's 1999 book Flamingoes in Orbit.
- Ridley's song Who Will Love Me Now? was covered by the techno/house band Sunscreem under the title Please Save Me. The song became a cult hit in clubs, entered the top 40 UK chart, top 30 US dance chart and featured in the film South West 9.
- The music track Phantasm which opens Biosphere's 1994 album Patashnik samples dialogue from The Krays.
- The song Omlagus Garfungiloops (from Coil's 1992 album Stolen & Contaminated Songs) features excerpts of dialogue from The Reflecting Skin.
- The Scottish band River Head used a photography still from The Reflecting Skin on the cover of their 1992 single sided 7-inch EP Was Away / Haddit.
- Ridley's image Rainbow Kiss was used on the cover of the short story collection Oranges and Lemons: Stories by Gay Men, to which he also contributed as a writer.
- Ridley's charcoal drawing The Conversation was used as the cover to cult band Blowzabella's 1988 album Pingha Frenzy.
- The American singer-songwriter Ethel Cain's song I Keep the Angel is inspired by - and the title taken from a line in - Philip Ridley's film The Reflecting Skin.

== Notable awards received ==
- 2026 Offie Creation Award for Tarantula.
- 2013 Scotsman Fringe First Award for Dark Vanilla Jungle.
- 2010 Toronto After Dark Film Festival Vision Award for Best Independent Feature Film for Heartless.
- 2010 Fantasporto Film Festival Best Film Award for Heartless.
- 2010 Fantasporto Film Festival Best Director Award for Heartless.
- 2009 Leeds International Film Festival Silver Melies Award for Heartless.
- 1993 WH Smith Mind-Boggling Book Award for Krindlekrax.
- 1993 Meyer-Whitworth Award for Most Promising New Playwright for The Fastest Clock in the Universe.
- 1992 Time Out Award for The Fastest Clock in the Universe.
- 1992 Critics' Circle Theatre Award for Most Promising Playwright for The Fastest Clock in the Universe.
- 1992 Evening Standard Theatre Award for Most Promising Playwright for The Fastest Clock in the Universe.
- 1991 Nestle Smarties Book Prize (9–11 years category) for Krindlekrax.
- 1990 Evening Standard British Film Award for Most Promising Newcomer for The Krays.
- 1990 Evening Standard British Film Award for Best Film for The Krays
- Silver Leopard at the Locarno Film Festival for The Reflecting Skin.
- 1990 FIPRESCI Award at the Stockholm Film Festival for The Reflecting Skin.

== Notable award nominations ==
- 2016 Offie for Best New Play Award - Karagula
- 2016 Offie Best Production Award - Karagula
- 2011 London Festival Fringe Best Play Award for the 2010 London revival of Vincent River.
- 2013 Brian Way Best New Play Award - Feathers in the Snow
- 2012 Offie fr New Play Award - Shivered
- 2011 London Festival Fringe Best Play Award - 2010 London revival of Vincent River.
- 2011 London Festival Fringe Best Play Award - Tender Napalm
- 2009 The MOBIUS Best Off-West End Production award for Piranha Heights, WhatsOnStage.com Theatregoers Choice Awards
- Carnegie Medal for Mighty Fizz Chilla
- Shortlisted for the Blue Peter Book Award: The Book I Couldn't Put Down for Mighty Fizz Chilla
- Carnegie Medal - Scribbleboy
- 1995 Whitbread Children's Book Award - Kasper in the Glitter
- 1990 Evening Standard British Film Awards for Best Screenplay for The Krays
- 1988 Cannes Film Festival for Best Short Film - The Universe of Dermot Finn
