= The Storyteller Sequence =

Series of plays by Philip Ridley

Cover of the collection published by Bloomsbury Methuen Drama which contains all of the plays so far produced in the sequence.

The Storyteller Sequence is a series of one act dramas written for young people by Philip Ridley. The plays, all set in east London, use fairytale stories and theatrical conventions to reveal the traumas of their young protagonists. To date there are five plays in the sequence, although Ridley has intimated there will eventually be seven. The five written to date are Karamazoo, Fairytaleheart, Moonfleece, Sparkleshark and Brokenville; note that although this is not the order in which the plays were written and performed chronologically, it is the order Ridley intends the finished "sequence" to run.

A collection bringing together the five plays produced so far in the sequence was published by Bloomsbury Methuen Drama in late 2015.

== Karamazoo (2004) ==
Karamazoo is a fifteen-minute monologue from an east London teenager called Ace. Two versions of the play exist, for male and female actors respectively. Ace is the most popular boy/girl at school, waiting at a bus stop for a date. Through his/her interaction with the audience, we discover that Ace's recent surge in popularity is the result of a personality "makeover" following the death of a parent; in recounting the fairytale stories told by the dead father/mother, Ace reveals how much the loss still haunts them and realises the vacuousness and selfishness.

The monologue was part of the National Theatre Shell Connections 2004 portfolio, with the first drafts of both the male and female version of the monologue being made available to download for free from the NT Shell Connections website.

== Fairytaleheart (1998) ==
In Fairytaleheart, two 15-year-old youths deal with ruptured families and homelessness by embracing their hopes and fears in a derelict community centre.

Kirsty's mother died two years ago, but she is still grieving whilst watching her father announce his engagement to her 'stepmother' she flees her own birthday party and sits alone in the community centre that was once her mother's 'kingdom', where she then meets Gideon: the complete opposite to popular, pretty, pretentious Kirsty. He's a scruffy boy with 'rat tails' for hair. Together by the catharsis of storytelling they enter the magic world of karamazoo and search for the 'luminous butterfly'. Finally finding it in themselves to see their problems in a new light. The story ends seeming as though they are about to kiss.

== Sparkleshark (1997) ==
Sparkleshark is a play about a teenage boy called Jake. As he is sitting alone, on top of the block of flats he lives in, writing stories, a troubled girl who is polly (she's a carer for her younger brother) who has started in his school, who recently moved into the block of flats comes up to quietly fix a satellite dish. At first he is abusive and defensive but lightens to her when she compliments his work. More people come up to the roof for different reasons. Natasha, the popular girl, goes up to find Polly; Carol, the wannabe, follows Natasha after getting bored. She then calls up Russell, the school Bully and his two friends Buzz and Speed Follow, as well as "emo" Shane, Natasha's ex-Boyfriend. As Russell and his boys go to dangle Jake over the roof they are stopped by the offer to hear a story by Jake, at first a little hesitant to tell one as it was Polly's idea, but eventually he does, and as he does the others start acting it out. It is a fairytale about a Prince (Russell) and his Horses (Buzz and Speed), a Princess (Polly) her father (Jake), a Witch (Tasha) and a Wizard (Shane) and a Frog (Carol) at the end of the story they are attacked by a dragon known as "Sparkleshark" due to its shiny scales, who is played by Finn, Polly's Grunge brother. The story has a happy ending with all being resolved and the play ends with all the group promising to meet up on a regular basis to read and act out stories.

== Moonfleece (2004) ==
Moonfleece is the story of Curtis, a young right-wing activist in East London who arranges a meeting in a flat in a derelict tower block where he grew up. Years ago, when he was a child, Curtis lived happily here but, then, tragedy struck and his elder brother died. Now Curtis is seeing his brother's ghost. With the aid of Gavin and Tommy, fellow members of the right wing political party of which he is a leading figure, Curtis aims to find out why this ghost is haunting him. Things, however, do not go as planned. For a start, there are two squatters now occupying the flat. And one of them has a story to tell. A story that will change Curtis's life forever.

Moonfleece received a professional world premiere in March–April 2010, opening at Rich Mix on Bethnal Green Road for the 2010 East Festival before touring the UK, produced by London-based independent theatre company Supporting Wall. The production stars Sean Verey (Skins, Dead Man Running) as Curtis and is directed by David Mercatali. The controversial play has been banned in Dudley, but afterwards was performed in Greenwich. Its poster was designed by photographer Adam Levy.

== Brokenville (2000) ==
Brokenville has had the longest gestation period of all Ridley's plays. It was first performed as Cavesongs and was part of Ridley's performance art work while he was a student at St Martin's School of Art. It was then done as an afternoon rehearsed reading at the Hampstead Theatre in London (with Jude Law playing one of the parts, fresh from doing Ridley's The Fastest Clock in the Universe) and subsequently presented as a work-in-progress for a short run under the name of Apocalyptica. Ridley continued working on the play, until it became Brokenville, and it subsequently became part of the National Theatre Connections plays for young people and performed at the Olivier Stage of the National Theatre in England in 2003. It was more recently performed in March 2015 by a drama group starring Rachel Price and Georgia Sloan. The background for Brokenville is an unknown disaster, which has left the play's seven characters with little knowledge of who they are or of what has happened. As an old woman and five teenagers begin to act out stories for a mute and frightened child, they begin to discover a little of who they were and what they can be.
