= In the Eyes of Mr Fury =

1998 book by Philip Ridley

- Cover of first edition
- Author: Philip Ridley
- Language: English
- Genre: Gay literature, coming-of-age story, magic realism, mystery novel
- Publication date: 1989 (revised version 2016)
- Publication place: United Kingdom

In the Eyes of Mr Fury is a gay, coming-of-age, magic realist, mystery novel by Philip Ridley. It was Ridley's second novel to be published; his first novel, Crocodilia, was released in 1988. It was also the first book published by the Penguin Books Originals imprint.

In 2015, it was announced that the novel was to be reissued by Valancourt Books along with Ridley's other gay-themed literature for adults, Crocodilia and Flamingoes in Orbit. It was revealed in 2016 that the novel had been fully revised by Ridley to be almost double the length of the original edition, with Valancourt Books stating on their website that "Ridley has reimagined the story, expanding the original short novel into the world's first LGBT magical realist epic" and that the new edition is "a vast, labyrinthine, hall-of-mirrors saga... covering over a hundred years." This new edition was released on 6 December 2016, and was later made into an audiobook that was released on iTunes and Audible in late 2017.

== In other media ==
- The song "Fury Eyes" from The Creatures' second album, Boomerang, is dedicated to the novel.
