= Krindlekrax =

1991 children's novel by Philip Ridley

- First edition
- Author: Philip Ridley
- Language: English
- Genre: Children's
- Publication date: 1991
- Publication place: United Kingdom

Krindlekrax is a thriller children's novel by author Philip Ridley. It was first published in 1991 by Jonathan Cape and republished in 1992 by Red Fox and then again in 2001 by Puffin Books where it is still in print.

The book won the Nestlé Smarties Book Prize in 1991 in the 9 – 11 age category. It was also selected by children aged 9 to 12 as the winner of the 1993 WH Smith Mind-Boggling Book Award.

The book became a Tellastory Audio Cassette in 1994 that was read by Rik Mayall.

In 2000, to celebrate the new millennium, Hachette Children's Group published Out of this world, a collection of extracts from "the best in 20th century children's literature". Krindlekrax was one of the books featured and appeared alongside such classics as Roald Dahl's Matilda and J.K. Rowling's Harry Potter and the Philosopher's Stone.

Ridley adapted Krindlekrax into a stage play, which premiered at Birmingham Repertory Theatre in 2002.

== Plot ==
The story takes place in a street called Lizard Street, located in a town with cracked pavements, scorched brickwork and bumps and holes in the roads. It centres around a 9-year-old boy named Ruskin Splinter, who is small and thin with thick glasses, red frizzy hair, knock-knees and a squeaky voice. He wants to be the hero of a school play, but everyone criticises him for his appearance and voice, and the role is instead given to Ruskin's window-smashing former friend Elvis Cave. Ruskin's special friend is the local school caretaker, Corky Pigeon, who tells him his experiences with the evil monster that lurks in the sewers and terrorises the street, a giant fire breathing crocodile named Krindlekrax, that got a taste for Corky's blood after it bit his knee and left him with a limp.

Later, Ruskin finds out from his tried dad that everyone in Lizard Street was responsible for the monster getting into the sewers in the first place, and how it grew so big. Elvis's father owned a pub, The Dragon and the Golden Penny, and a series of suggestions led to Ruskin's father sneaking a baby crocodile out of the zoo where he worked at the time so that Mr Cave could use the crocodile as a template for painting a sign for his pub. However, when Mrs Cave went into labour with Elvis, the Caves ran out of the pub so abruptly that they forgot about the crocodile, which escaped into the sewers, and has since been gorging itself on the old toast Ruskin's mother throws out down the drain outside their house.

Ashamed of his parents' role in Krindlekrax's existence, Ruskin attempts to end his friendship with Corky, but Corky assures him that he values Ruskin's friendship too highly to end it like that. However, Corky unexpectedly dies that night, and everyone suspects it to be a heart attack, but Ruskin knows that Krindlekrax was responsible, and is angry with all of Lizard Street for allowing it to happen.

Ruskin is so upset with Corky's death that he can't get out of bed, but many people bring him gifts and tell him the story of how Corky got a gold medal (that he later gave to Ruskin as a present) for saving Lizard Street. As a child, Corky was playing in the local rubbish tip and found an unexploded bomb; when Corky restarted the bomb by stepping on it, he remained perfectly still for the next several hours until the police and army were able to get someone in to disarm the bomb. After hearing this story, Ruskin decides to save the street from the wrath of Krindlekrax once and for all.

Later that night, Ruskin lures the monster out of the sewers, and tames it by throwing Corky's medal in its mouth (much like the tale in the play that inspired the name of the Caves' pub), removing the medal in exchange for Krindlekrax agreeing to remain in the sewers forever.

After catching a terrible cold while "sleep-walking" the night before, Elvis can't do the play any more, so Ruskin takes his place and it all goes well, but Elvis isn't pleased and smashes all the windows in Lizard Street that he can in a tantrum. Ruskin stops Elvis' window smashing by bursting his ball and after a long talk, they become friends again.

The story ends with Ruskin saying how much he now loves his street.

== Characters ==
- Ruskin Splinter: The main character who may look small and dorky, but proves to be quite a hero.
- Krindlekrax: The monster who lurks under the sewers of Lizard Street. It was once an infant crocodile but grew into a fierce fire breathing monster.
- Wendy Splinter: Ruskin's mother who loves toast and tea and says "Polly Wolly Doodle all the Day!" when she gets flustered.
- Winston Splinter: Ruskin's father, a fired zookeeper who is always complaining and saying "It's not my fault!" and "Don't interfere!"
- Elvis Cave: The big and loud school bully who wears an American footballer's outfit and breaks windows (even when he sleepwalks), he was once Ruskin's friend but grew jealous of him when he became friends with Corky.
- Sparkey Walnut: A timid boy who wears a baseball player's outfit. He was once Ruskin's friend but became Elvis' follower after he grew so tall and always said "Yes Sir!" to everything he said.
- Corky Pigeon: An elderly man who was once a sewer maintenance man, but later became the caretaker at St George's school. He loved chocolate biscuits and shared a lot in common with Ruskin about plays.
- Mr. Lace: The school teacher who enjoys sucking pencils and gets hysterical whenever William Shakespeare's name is mentioned.
- Dr. Flowers: A man who always has his pockets full of tissues to help with his hay-fever, which causes him to sneeze at regular intervals.
- Mr. Flick: A smart suited man who owns the cinema in Lizard Street.
- Mrs. Walnut: Sparkey's mother who owns the greengrocers shop and always smells of potatoes.
- Mr. and Mrs. Cave: Elvis' parents who own the Dragon and the Golden Penny pub and seem to do nothing about their son's window smashing.

== Stage adaptation ==
Krindlekrax
- Original language: English
- Written by: Philip Ridley
- Based on: The novel Krindlekrax by Philip Ridley
- Genre: Children's theatre

Premiere
- Date: 20 June 2002
- Place: Birmingham Repertory Theatre

Philip Ridley (himself an acclaimed playwright) adapted the novel into a stage play for children. The play premiered at Birmingham Rep, where it was performed from 20 – 29 June 2002. The production transferred to the Nottingham Playhouse where it played 4 – 20 July the same year.

Premiere

On 20 June 2002 at The Birmingham Repertory Theatre, Birmingham.
Directed by Anthony Clark.

- Ruskin Splinter – Gregor Henderson-Begg
- Wendy Splinter – Maria Gough
- Winston Splinter – Jamie Newall
- Corky Pigeon – Alan Rothwell
- Elvis Cave – David Florez
- Mr Cave – Nick Stringer
- Mrs Cave – Joy Aldridge
- Sparkey Walnut – Sushil Chudasama
- Dr Flowers – John Flitcroft
- Mr Lace – David Kendall
- Mrs Walnut – Bharti Patel
- Mr Flick – Trevor Thomas

Publication of script

The script was published by Faber and Faber in 2002. However, the text became out of print due to Ridley leaving Faber and Faber in 2005 as a result of their refusal to publish his controversial stage play for adults Mercury Fur.
