= The Passion of Darkly Noon =

- UK Theatrical release poster
- Directed by: Philip Ridley
- Written by: Philip Ridley
- Produced by: Dominic Anciano
- Starring: Brendan Fraser; Ashley Judd; Viggo Mortensen
- Cinematography: John de Borman
- Edited by: Les Healey
- Music by: Nick Bicât
- Production companies: Alain Keytsman Production; Fugitive Darkly Noon; Fugitive Features; hauskunst Filmproduktions
- Distributed by: Entertainment Film Distributors (United Kingdom); Jugendfilm-Verleih (Germany)
- Release dates: 19 May 1995 (United States); 25 April 1996 (Germany); 14 June 1996 (United Kingdom)
- Running time: 100 minutes
- Countries: United Kingdom; Belgium; Germany
- Language: English

The Passion of Darkly Noon is a 1995 psychological drama film written and directed by Philip Ridley. The film stars Brendan Fraser, Ashley Judd, and Viggo Mortensen.

The protagonist's name and film title come both from a passage in the Bible, 1 Corinthians 13: "Now we see through a glass, darkly...".

For the film Ridley was awarded the Best Director Prize at the Porto Film festival.

== Plot ==
Darkly Noon (Brendan Fraser), named for a Bible passage, is a young man who has spent his entire life as a member of an ultraconservative Christian cult. After a violent incident in which the cult is dissolved and Darkly's parents die, the disoriented Darkly wanders into a forest in the Appalachian region of North Carolina. He is rescued from exhaustion by an undertaker's assistant named Jude (Loren Dean) and his friend Callie (Ashley Judd).

Jude leaves Darkly in Callie's care. As Callie nurses him back to health, Darkly becomes frustrated by the conflict between his religious past and his attraction to his new companion. His frustration intensifies when Clay (Viggo Mortensen), Callie's mute lover, who makes the coffins Jude helps sell, returns home after being away for a few days. Darkly's inner turmoil is compounded after he encounters Clay's mother, Roxy (Grace Zabriskie), who is deeply resentful of Callie for her relationship with Clay. Roxy tells Darkly that she believes that Callie is a witch bent on destroying her family.

Despite his detached behavior, Darkly becomes good friends with Jude. One day, Darkly discovers a giant shoe floating down on the river, and when Roxy's dog dies, they place the body in the shoe and set it on fire as a floating funeral pyre.

Jude proposes that he and Darkly move away to live together. Darkly agrees, and Jude leaves with plans to return for Darkly. Overcome with loneliness, Roxy commits suicide. After finding Roxy's body, Darkly hallucinates that his dead parents are telling him to kill Callie.

Now thoroughly unhinged, Darkly wraps himself in barbed wire, paints himself red, and arms himself with one of Clay's chisels. He bursts into Callie and Clay's house, intent on murdering the couple, whom he discovers having sex. During the horrific attack, a fire starts, which quickly burns down the house.

Jude arrives, sees the inferno, and rushes to rescue Callie and Clay. When Callie tells Darkly that she loves him, Darkly hesitates, giving Jude the opportunity to shoot him with Clay's rifle. After entreating Callie "Who will love me now?", Darkly falls dead.

The next morning, while Callie, Clay, and Jude view the ruins of the house, a family of circus performers arrives. They tell the survivors they have lost everything, including the giant shoe, which they had been using as a boat. They ask Callie for aid in getting out of the forest, and she agrees to guide them. They youngest boy gives Callie a smaller silver shoe, and everyone departs together.

== Cast ==
- Brendan Fraser as Darkly Noon
- Ashley Judd as Callie
- Viggo Mortensen as Clay
- Loren Dean as Jude
- Lou Myers as Quincy
- Grace Zabriskie as Roxy

== Production ==
Philip Ridley came up with the idea for The Passion of Darkly Noon during his time directing The Reflecting Skin as on the drive to and from set he'd pass a fenced off compound that belonged to a cult. On the drives past the compound, Ridley would make up stories to amuse the passengers on the two hour drive about a man who was born in one of those cults who had never seen the outside world. This would serve as the foundation for what would eventually become The Passion of Darkly Noon. Ridley wanted to give the film a feeling of being like a fairy tale with framed around American fears fueled by religious fervor.

== Critical reception ==
Entertainment Weekly called The Passion of Darkly Noon "an unintended comedy with a scorcher of an ending", citing poor acting, over-the-top dialogue and implausible plot twists. Conversely, Fangoria magazine praised the film, citing especially the performance of Brendan Fraser.

Leading UK film critic Mark Kermode has raved about the film calling it "One of my favourite cinematic experiences of recent years" and also citing it as "[Ridley's] great unsung work."

Like Ridley's previous film The Reflecting Skin, it has developed a cult following and in 2014 made the top 10 in The Daily Telegraph's list of the 50 most underrated films of all time.
