= The Reflecting Skin =

1990 British-Canadian dramatic horror film

- Theatrical release poster
- Directed by: Philip Ridley
- Written by: Philip Ridley
- Produced by: Dominic Anciano; Ray Burdis
- Starring: Viggo Mortensen; Lindsay Duncan; Jeremy Cooper
- Cinematography: Dick Pope
- Edited by: Scott Thomas
- Music by: Nick Bicât
- Production companies: BBC Films; Téléfilm Canada; Zenith
- Distributed by: Virgin Vision (United Kingdom); Miramax Films (United States)
- Release dates: 15 May 1990 (Cannes); 9 September 1990 (Toronto); 9 November 1990 (United Kingdom); 28 June 1991 (United States)
- Running time: 95 minutes
- Countries: United Kingdom; Canada
- Language: English
- Budget: $1.5 million
- Box office: $17,042

The Reflecting Skin is a 1990 coming-of-age psychological horror film written and directed by Philip Ridley and starring Jeremy Cooper, Viggo Mortensen, and Lindsay Duncan. Set in 1950s rural Idaho, the film follows an impressionable young boy who comes to believe that a neighboring widow is a vampire responsible for a number of disappearances in the community. Described by its director as a "mythical interpretation" of childhood, the film weaves elements of vampirism, surrealism, black comedy, symbolism, and religious zealotry throughout its narrative.

A co-production between the United Kingdom and Canada via BBC Films and Téléfilm Canada, The Reflecting Skin was shot on location in Crossfield, Alberta, a rural community north of Calgary.

The Reflecting Skin premiered at the 1990 Cannes Film Festival, where it received critical acclaim. It was theatrically released in the United Kingdom in November 1990 by Virgin Vision. In the United States, the film was acquired for distribution by Miramax Films, who gave it a limited theatrical release on 28 June 1991.

== Plot ==
Eight-year-old Seth Dove lives in an isolated Idaho prairie community in the 1950s. The film opens with Seth and his friends, Eben and Kim, playing with a frog Seth has found in the fields. The boys inflate the frog by inserting a reed up its anus and leave it by the side of the road. When a local English widow, Dolphin Blue, stops to inspect it, Seth shoots the inflated frog with a slingshot, causing it to explode over Dolphin.

Seth retreats back to the small gas station where he lives with his overworked, harsh, longing mother Ruth and shy, closeted, detached father Luke. Seth's older brother, Cameron, is away on military service in the Pacific (Ruth refers to them as "the pretty islands"). Seth serves gas to a mysterious group of young men driving a black Cadillac, who promise to see him again soon and drive off.

Seth is sent to Dolphin's house to apologise for the frog prank. Dolphin is haunted by the memory of her dead husband, who hanged himself for unknown reasons a week after their wedding. Surrounded by artefacts from her husband's family's whaling past, Seth takes some of her self-pitying remarks (she claims to be "two hundred years old") literally. After having just learned about vampires from his father, Seth begins to believe that Dolphin must be a vampire.

After Eben goes missing, Seth and Kim go to Dolphin's house to investigate, because Seth believes she is responsible for Eben's disappearance. They go up to Dolphin's bedroom and demolish her belongings. They later hear Dolphin downstairs. The boys proceed to spy on her as she sits on a chair, moaning and touching herself. After getting caught, the boys scream and run outside. Seth sees the same black Cadillac from before, after which he runs home and later finds Eben's dead body floating in the water cistern. The local authorities believe that Seth's father, Luke, is responsible due to Luke's previous sexual encounter with a teenaged boy; believing himself to be doomed, Luke douses himself with gasoline and incinerates himself.

Cameron returns home from the military to look after his brother Seth, as Ruth has become shell-shocked following her husband's self-immolation. Whilst visiting his grave, Cameron meets Dolphin, and romance sparks between the two, much to Seth's horror. In a nearby barn, Seth and Kim discover an ossified dead fetus, which Seth takes home with him, believing it to be Eben incarnate as a fallen angel. Cameron shows Seth a photograph of a baby dying from radiation poisoning, which both fascinates and disturbs Seth. The next day, Seth follows Cameron to Dolphin's house, where he observes Cameron emotionally confessing to Dolphin his culpability in atomic bomb experiments. Cameron and Dolphin begin to make love; running in terror from the house, Seth witnesses the men in the Cadillac abducting Kim.

Cameron's body begins to deteriorate from radiation sickness, which Seth attributes to Dolphin's supposed vampirism. Kim's body is discovered the next day, and law enforcement authorities still believe that Luke is alive and responsible. As Cameron and Dolphin grow closer and plot to run away together, Seth focuses his rage at Dolphin. He consults with the fetus "angel Eben" that night on how to deal with her. On the spur of the moment the next day, as she is about to get a ride from them, he does not warn Dolphin of the men in the black Cadillac. Dolphin's body is found, and Cameron breaks down in front of Seth. Seth runs to a nearby field and screams at the setting sun.

== Cast ==
- Jeremy Cooper as Seth Dove
- Viggo Mortensen as Cameron Dove
- Lindsay Duncan as Dolphin Blue
- Sheila Moore as Ruth Dove
- Duncan Fraser as Luke Dove
- David Longworth as Joshua
- Robert Koons as Sheriff Ticker
- David Bloom as Deputy
- Evan Hall as Kim
- Codie Lucas Wilbee as Eben
- Sherry Bie as Cassie
- Jason Wolfe as Cadillac Driver
- Dean Hass as Passenger
- Guy Buller as Passenger
- Jason Brownlow as Passenger
- Jeff Walker as Adam Blue
- Joyce Robbins as Twin
- Jacqueline Robbins as Twin
- Debi Greenawdt as First Woman
- Sandra Redmond as Second Woman
- Walt Healy as Old Man

== Production ==
Philip Ridley was inspired to write the screenplay for The Reflecting Skin after completing a sequence of artworks titled American Gothic whilst studying at St Martin's School of Art. "I read a lot of American literature when I was a child growing up and saw a lot of American films so what I did, particularly in The Reflecting Skin, is that I created a fabulous child-eyed view of what I imagined America to be like – it's a kind of mythical once upon a time never-world, where guys look like Marlon Brando and Elvis Presley, and everything is set in a Wheatfield and it all looks very American gothic."

Upon directing two short films (Visiting Mr. Beak and The Universe of Dermot Finn) and completing the screenplay for The Krays (directed by Peter Medak), Ridley received $1.5 million of funding from the BBC, British Screen and Zenith Productions to shoot The Reflecting Skin in Crossfield, Alberta, Canada.

In collaboration with director of photography Dick Pope, Ridley channelled his artistic influences (including Andrew Wyeth and Edward Hopper) to create a hyper-realised vision of a "mythical, hallucinogenic summer in the life of a child." This extended to Ridley personally spray-painting the wheatfields a brighter shade of yellow, and shooting exterior scenes at 'magic hour', "when the sun was at its most intense and golden." The film also features Viggo Mortensen in one of his first starring roles.

== Release ==
In the United States, Miramax Films gave the film a limited theatrical release on 28 June 1991.

=== Home media ===
The Reflecting Skin was unavailable on home video for many years following its initial VHS release in the United Kingdom and United States. A widescreen DVD was released in Japan in 2005, but quickly went out of print, leaving only a poor-quality German Blu-ray and a full frame American DVD release from Echo Bridge Entertainment as the only available releases for several years.

In 2015, British distributor Soda Pictures announced a release of the film in a limited Blu-ray SteelBook edition on 30 November 2015, featuring a new director-approved HD remaster, director's commentary, two new documentaries, Philip Ridley's early short films (Visiting Mr. Beak and The Universe of Dermot Finn), and a personally signed art card of his painting Fetal Blossom, which was one of the artworks that inspired the film. The distributor later released a standard edition Blu-ray and DVD of the film on 14 March 2016, containing all the features of the limited edition except for the signed art card or SteelBook packaging.

In 2016, Ridley's approved remaster of the film was released on BFI Player, where it was made available for online streaming.

In 2019, Film Movement released the movie on Blu-ray and DVD in the United States and Canada.

In 2020, The Criterion Channel added the film on the streaming service as part of the double feature "Against the Grain" with 1978's Days of Heaven. Both films were described as "Magic hour meets black magic" and as "two visually stunning slices of Americana set amid rippling wheat fields and bathed in sunset’s golden glow."

== Reception ==
=== Box office ===
The Reflecting Skin was given a limited North American theatrical release through Miramax, and was a box office bomb, grossing $17,042.

=== Critical response ===
The Reflecting Skin premiered at the 1990 Cannes Film Festival, where the critics declared it "déjà un culte" ("already a cult") before they had even left the auditorium. The word of mouth about the film, particularly the notorious "exploding frog" opening, was so intense that extra screenings had to be scheduled in order to cater to demand. It went on to win 11 international awards at other film festivals.

Although some critics were outraged by the film's "abnormal situations and morbid characters", among the more prominent admirers of The Reflecting Skin was Roger Ebert, who said it "reminded me of Blue Velvet and the other works of David Lynch, but I think it's better… it's not really about America at all, it's about nightmares, and I'm not easily going to forget it."

Writing for Rolling Stone, Peter Travers wrote that "Ridley is a visionary, and his haunting film, luminously shot by Dick Pope, exerts a hypnotic pull." Kevin Thomas of the Los Angeles Times called it "an amazing film, studded with selfless, luminous performances and shot through with dark humor, that risks sheer over-the-top outrageousness at every turn but is so simultaneously inspired and controlled that it gets away with everything."

The Reflecting Skin has been reappraised in recent years as "one of the essential art film/horror hybrids from the past few decades." Film review aggregator Rotten Tomatoes reports an approval rating of 88%, based on 17 reviews, with a rating average of 7/10. Reviewing the 2015 restoration for Twitch Film, Jason Gorber described it as a "strange, at times wonderful film, one that leaves more questions open than answers. Its palate and performances collide in ways that seem unique decades on." Writing for The Guardian, Rowan Righelato described it as "stunningly beautiful… a gothic masterpiece that is often strangely overlooked." Reviewing the special edition Blu-ray on BBC News, Mark Kermode said "Philip Ridley is an extraordinary filmmaker... A really strange, interesting, disturbing, weird piece of work that has found its audience over the years. That's what a proper cult film looks like."

=== Accolades ===
At the 1990 Locarno International Film Festival, Ridley won three awards, C.I.C.A.E. Award, the FIPRESCI Prize, and Silver Leopard. At the 1990 Sitges – Catalan International Film Festival, Lindsay Duncan won the Best Actress award and Dick Pope the award for Best Cinematography. At the 1990 Stockholm Film Festival, Ridley received the FIPRESCI Prize.

== Derivative works ==
Elements of the film have been referenced and used in a number of other artistic works, particularly in music.

- The cult British band Coil used dialogue excerpts from the film on the track Omlagus Garfungiloops on their 1992 album Stolen & Contaminated Songs.
- The Scottish band River Head used a still from the film on the cover of their 1992 single sided 7-inch EP Was Away / Haddit.
- The Canadian musician Phil Western used dialogue excerpts from the film in his 1998 Album The Escapist.
- The industrial/noise rock duo Uniform used a dialogue excerpt from the film on the track The Light at the End (Effect) on their 2017 LP Wake in Fright.
- The American musician Ethel Cain used dialogue excerpts from the film on the track "Amber Waves" from her 2025 studio recording Perverts.

== See also ==
- Dandelion Wine
- Tideland (film)

== Sources ==
- Muir, John Kenneth (2011). Horror Films of the 1990s. Jefferson, North Carolina: McFarland. ISBN 978-0-786-48480-5.
- Ridley, Philip (1997). The American Dreams: The Reflecting Skin & The Passion of Darkly Noon. London, England: Methuen. ISBN 0-413-71140-4.
- Ridley, Philip (21 October 2015). The Pitchfork Disney. Modern Classics (Reissue ed.). London, England: Methuen Drama. p. 20. ISBN 978-1-4725-1400-4.
