= Ian Shuttleworth =

Northern Irish theatre critic and author (born 1963)

Terence Ian Shuttleworth (born 6 July 1963 in Belfast, UK) is a retired Northern Irish theatre critic and author. He was one of the senior theatre critics for the Financial Times from May 2007 to March 2019, and editor and publisher of Theatre Record magazine from 2004 until 2016. In March 2019 he left the UK for Germany.

Educated at the Royal Belfast Academical Institution with a double first class degree in English literature from Queens' College, Cambridge, he wrote reviews for the Financial Times, and occasionally The Sunday Times, The Guardian, London Evening Standard, The Observer, The Independent, Daily Mail, The Sun, The Scotsman, The Stage, Stagebill, Plays & Players, Screen International, Broadcast, OK!, and City Life.

His 1994 book Ken & Em (Headline Books, 1994), is an unauthorised biography of Kenneth Branagh and Emma Thompson. He also made a contribution to the book Reading the Vampire Slayer: An Unofficial Critical Companion to Buffy and Angel (Tauris Parke, 2001).

He was profiled in one of the four episodes of the 1998 documentary television series about critics, Critical Condition by Jon Ronson.
