= Heartless (2009 film) =

- Theatrical release poster
- Directed by: Philip Ridley
- Written by: Philip Ridley
- Produced by: Pippa Cross; Richard Raymond
- Starring: Jim Sturgess; Joseph Mawle; Noel Clarke; Clémence Poésy; Nikita Mistry; Timothy Spall
- Cinematography: Matt Gray
- Edited by: Chris Gill; Paul Knight
- Music by: David Julyan
- Distributed by: Lionsgate
- Release dates: 31 August 2009 (FrightFest); 21 May 2010 (United Kingdom)
- Running time: 114 minutes
- Country: United Kingdom
- Language: English
- Budget: $5 million
- Box office: $20,435

Heartless is a 2009 British psychological horror film written and directed by Philip Ridley and starring Jim Sturgess, Noel Clarke, Clémence Poésy, Joseph Mawle, Eddie Marsan, and Timothy Spall. This was Ridley's first film in fourteen years since 1995's The Passion of Darkly Noon. The film garnered positive reception from critics who praised the performances and dark atmospheric tone that complemented the Faustian plot.

== Plot ==
Jamie Morgan is a lonely, troubled photographer with a large heart-shaped birthmark that covers nearly half of his face. He is still a virgin at 25 because a lifetime of alienation and bullying have left him unable to make friends or attract women. At the photographic studio, he shares with his brother and nephew Lee, he meets aspiring model Tia.

As Jamie develops photos from a shoot, he notices a disturbing face looking at him from the window of a house. When he goes back to investigate, he follows a suspicious man to a group of hooded vandals around a fire, who emit eerie shrieks. One notices Jamie and shrieks at him. Jamie is shocked to see a demonic lizard-like face under the hood, with huge pin-like teeth. Over time, Jamie becomes aware of a series of horrific murders by Molotov cocktail that have been occurring in the neighbourhood. A witness to one of the murders, a little Asian girl, tells a TV reporter that they weren't wearing masks; the demonic faces were real. Jamie's neighbour and new-found friend, A.J. turns up with a huge wound that looks as if it was caused by claw marks. Parts of his dismembered body then turn up in the local area.

Jamie and his mother are walking in the neighborhood when they are attacked by the demonic gang. His mother is immolated while Jamie watches helplessly, and he is savagely beaten and left for dead. While unconscious in hospital he glimpses a man in his dream who says he is waiting for Jamie. Later, he receives a phone call from a man with the same voice, and is guided to the apartment of Papa B and his assistant Belle, who looks just like the little Asian girl from the TV report. Papa B offers a Faustian bargain: Jamie must fulfil Papa B's desire for chaos with occasional acts of vandalism in return for the removal of his birthmarks. Despite Papa B admitting that he was responsible for his mother's death as a way of bringing Jamie to him, Jamie consents and they shake hands. Jamie is told to immolate himself with a Molotov cocktail in order to be reborn. Jamie miraculously survives and peels away his burned skin to reveal perfect, unblemished skin.

Initially things go well: a chance meeting with Tia leads a newly confident Jamie to spend the day with her in the park, where his beloved, deceased father first taught him to use a camera. The deal sours, however, when the Weapons Man arrives: Papa B has reneged on their bargain and Jamie must now commit murder by ripping the heart from a living victim. The Weapons Man tortures Jamie until he agrees to kill a street hustler. His hope for a better life returns after he and Tia become lovers. During this time, Belle also comes to live with Jamie, after Papa B beat her in a fit of rage. She starts calling Jamie "Dad" and becomes a bit of a guide to him, kindly and pragmatically explaining that he has no choice but to kill, to save his own life—and Belle's. But Papa B is outraged at Belle's betrayal and as punishment demands that Jamie kill a new victim—Tia.

Tia asks Jamie to put a photo album in his work safe, and it is revealed that Tia and Lee intended to steal his late mother's jewellery. Tia had initially meant only to help Lee gain access to the safe, but she ended up sincerely falling in love with Jamie. During the ensuing struggle Tia is accidentally shot and killed, and Lee is seriously wounded by "She", a gang leader to whom he owed money, and who wears a metallic claw in place of a severed hand.

Jamie is pursued by She but fights back and kills him. He notices that a mark on a wall from She's claw looks just like the wound received by A.J. Jamie tells Belle, who has turned up from nowhere, that she must flee to stay safe, and she disappears. Jamie spies himself in a mirror and sees that his birthmark has returned, and with it the knowledge that it had been there the entire time, even while he was courting Tia. Jamie confronts Papa B's minions and fights them off, but when faced with a larger demon, Papa B in his true form, runs away. Viewers are left to decide for themselves whether Papa B cheated Jamie by never removing the birthmark, or if much of what transpired was the product of Jamie's imagination.

After waking up indoors, Jamie staggers outside. On the ground he sees several masks with sharp teeth, and looks up to see several masked and hooded gang members. But these are ordinary masks made of sacks, not the realistic demon faces Jamie has seen so far. But the question is: are these the "demons" he had been fighting a short while ago? Jamie now recalls himself walking and talking with Belle—only now he appears to converse with empty space. As realisation sinks in, a gang member catches him with a Molotov cocktail. As he stands still and burns to death, Jamie experiences a vision of his father, who tells him that you can only see the stars in the blackness of the night. Whether this is a memory or a near-death experience is left unclear. Jamie ascends into bright light. The light fades into a field of stars in the night sky, mirroring the words spoken by his father.

== Cast ==
- Jim Sturgess as Jamie Morgan
- Noel Clarke as A.J.
- Clémence Poésy as Tia
- Eddie Marsan as Weapons Man
- Joseph Mawle as Papa B
- Ruth Sheen as Marion Morgan
- Timothy Spall as George Morgan
- Luke Treadaway as Lee Morgan
- Fraser Ayres as Vinnie
- Nikita Mistry as Belle
- Ross McCart as Young Jamie

== Music ==
The film featured a number of original songs for which Ridley himself had written the lyrics. The music for these songs were composed by Ridley's long-time collaborator Nick Bicât who had previously written music for productions of Ridley's stage plays and films. On Nick Bicât's website it states that the songs had been written to act "like a Greek chorus, commenting on the action. Every song in the film—whether heard on the radio, in a club, or used as part of the score".

As well as being the lead actor, Jim Sturgess also sang two of the songs in the film's soundtrack. When talking about the film's music Ridley explained that Jim Sturgess heard some of the songs and loved them. He wondered if, perhaps, it would be right for him to sing a couple. To be honest, Jim and I had discussed this possibility much earlier (Jim's talents are boundless. As well as being one of the greatest actors around, he is also a great singer...not to mention songwriter, poet—the list goes on!). Initially, we had both agreed it probably wouldn't be right. But as the film progressed, and the exploration of Jamie's mind in the film become ever more obsessive...well, it just seemed to make total sense for Jim to perform the two songs most pertinent to Jamie's state of mind: the theme music, Heartless, and Another Me."

The film's first soundtrack album - named Heartless - was distributed on 1 January 2010 and later online 17 May 2010 by Universal Music Digital Services and contained all the songs, the listing of which are below:

1. Heartless (sung by Jim Sturgess)
2. This Is the World We Live In (sung by Joe Echo)
3. What Skin Is All About (sung by Joe Echo)
4. The Other Me (sung by Jim Sturgess)
5. Lie to Me (sung by Joe Echo)
6. It Must Be Somewhere (sung by Mary Leay)
7. The Darker It Gets (sung by Joe Echo)
8. In You Are All the Stories (sung by Joe Echo)
9. Beautiful (sung by Joe Echoe)
10. Phoenix in Dynamite Sky (sung by Joe Echo)
11. Heartless (sung by Jim Sturgess)
12. Heartless (Instrumental)

Another Soundtrack album - Heartless (Original Motion Picture Soundtrack) - was released by MovieScore Media on 21 June 2011 and contained the orchestral music by David Julyan used in the film, the listing of which are below:

1. Heartless: Main Titles
2. Demons in the Dark
3. Journey to Cendrillon
4. Papa B
5. New Skin
6. Weapons Man
7. Magical Tree
8. It's Ten O'Clock
9. You're Beautiful
10. Papa B Returns
11. Run, Jamie, Run!
12. I'm Not Afraid
13. So Many Stars
14. Into the Dark

== Release ==
The film had its premiere on 31 August 2009 at Film 4's Fright Fest. The film was also shown as part of the 2009 Cork Film Festival and was part of the Fantasia Festival 2010.

The film was noted for being one of the first British films to almost have a simultaneous multi-platform release, being released in cinemas 21 May and distributed on DVD, Blu-ray and Digital Download just four days later on 25 May 2010.

The film has since been released as a digital rental on the BFI player.

== Critical reception ==
Heartless received generally positive reviews from critics. On the review aggregator website Rotten Tomatoes, 77% of 39 critics' reviews are positive, with an average rating of 5.9/10. The website's consensus reads: "Smart, well-acted, and unsettling, Heartless marks a mostly satisfying return to genre thrills for writer-director Philip Ridley." Gary Goldstein of the Los Angeles Times credited the film to both Jim Sturgess for having "a terrifically watchable presence," and director Philip Ridley for his compelling soundtrack and dark visual direction that "even at its most seemingly outlandish remains intriguing and involving." Joe Leydon of Variety praised the film for the performances of both Sturgess and Marsan and the direction of scenes that give off a morose tone, concluding that, "There's more mood than matter here, but suspenseful atmospherics effectively distract from minor plot holes."

Nathan Rabin of The A.V. Club gave the film a "B−", crediting its second-half moral tale and the brief appearances by Marsan and Spall but felt it was hampered by the first half with its "plodding pace, portentous tone, and underdeveloped characters", concluding that, "Ridley is a master of atmosphere and mood, but his fantastical conceits require a strong protagonist who isn't defined first by his birthmark, then by its absence." Ben Rawson-Jones of Digital Spy felt the film wasted its main cast with a promising plot that was half-heartedly executed with failed horror elements and dialogue that telegraphs the story, saying that, "The form and content are a perfect match in Heartless. Both are desperately terrible." He gave the film 1 star out of 5. Nick Schager of Slant Magazine criticised Ridley for crafting a Faustian film with an empty-headed protagonist, telegraphed plot elements, mixed moral themes and a muddled third act, giving the film 1 star out of 4.

== Awards ==
Year	Award Ceremony	Category	Recipient	Result
2010	European Fantastic Film Festivals Federation	Méliès d'Or	Heartless	Nominated
2010	Toronto After Dark Film Festival	Vision Award for Best Independent Feature Film	Heartless	Won
2010	Fantasporto	Grand Prix	Heartless	Won
2010	Fantasporto	Best Director	Philip Ridley	Won
2010	Fantasporto	Best Actor	Jim Sturges	Won
2009	Leeds International Film Festival	Silver Méliès Award	Heartless	Won
2009	Sitges Film Festival	Best Film	Heartless	Nominated
