= Peter Robbins (author) =

British author (born 1946)

- Born: 1946 (age 79–80); London, England
- Occupation: Author
- Website: filthy-rich.org/author.html

Peter Robbins (born 1946) is a British author whose published works include Stolen Fruit and a range of specialist books on related topics including precious metals markets, tropical commodity markets, trade sanctions, access to market information, and on support for rural communities.

He was a commodities trader in the City of London for 30 years. He was able to retire from the business early and became a consultant to the United Nations on trade relations between African countries and multinational companies. He worked also as an advisor to the African National Congress on trade sanctions against apartheid.

Since then he has worked for many development agencies on issues relating to agricultural trade policy and its impact on small scale farmers.

In 1971 he brought together specialist British metal traders to form the Minor Metals Trade Association.

He was a founder member and Chair of the World Gold Commission from 1988 to 1995. This anti-apartheid pressure group was successful in curtailing the import of newly mined South African gold into the United States, Italy and Britain.

He was the founder member of the London Equality Group - an organisation which campaigns for the reduction of wealth and income inequality in London in 2010 and served as Chair of My Fair London until 2013.

In 2014 Peter made a contribution to ideas in Neuroscience - Dirty Walls: An evolutionary theory of the dream function, which was published in the International Journal of Dream Research

== Selected publications ==
Guide to Non-Ferrous Metals and their Markets – (Kogan Page – 1979, 1980 and 1982)

Guide to Precious Metals and their Markets – (Kogan Page – 1979)

Trading in Metals – (Metal Bulletin – 1984)

Gold and Post-Apartheid South Africa – (Review of African Political Economy – Vol. 19 No.51 – 1991)

Tropical Commodities and their Markets (Kogan Page – 1995)

Review of market information systems in Botswana, Ethiopia, Ghana and Zimbabwe (Technical Centre for Agriculture – 2000)

Review of the impact of globalisation on the agricultural sectors and rural communities of ACP countries (Technical Centre for Agriculture – 1999)

Design of market information systems for small-scale producers and traders in three districts of Uganda (Technical Centre for Agriculture – 2000)

Stolen Fruit: The tropical commodities disaster (Zed Books – 2003)

Advice manual for the organisation of collective marketing activities by small-scale farmers (Natural Resources Institute – 2004)

Supply-side measures for raising low farm-gate prices of tropical beverage crops (South Centre – 2006)

Commodity exchanges and smallholders in Africa (International Institute for Environment and Development/ Sustainable Food Lab – 2011)

Contributor to:

After Apartheid – Renewal of the South African Economy (University of York and John Currey – 1988)

The Sanctions Report (The Commonwealth Secretariat – Penguin Books – 1990)

Sanctioning Apartheid (Africa World Press Inc. – 1991)

A Framework for Macroeconomic Policy in South Africa – Making Democracy Work (Centre for Development Studies – South Africa – 1993)

Information for agricultural and rural development in ACP countries: emerging stakeholders, new media and priority themes (Technical Centre for Agriculture – 2001)

Agricultural commodities, trade and sustainable development (IIED and ICTSD 2005)
