= Theatre Record =

- Categories: Theatre
- Frequency: Daily
- Founder: Ian Herbert
- First issue: January 1981
- Company: Theatre Record
- Country: United Kingdom
- Based in: Weymouth, Dorset
- Language: English
- Website: www.theatrerecord.com
- ISSN: 2633-657X

Theatre Record is a periodical that reprints reviews, production photographs, and other information about the British theatre.

== Overview ==
Theatre Record was founded in 1981 by Ian Herbert and has been published fortnightly since January 1981 until January 2019, when it became an online publication. Previously it was printed and published in England every two weeks.

It reprints unabridged all the national drama critics' reviews of productions in and out of London, with full casts and credits. It also lists early information of forthcoming shows all over the country, including box office and press contact numbers. Production photographs are published whenever possible, to provide a visual as well as verbal record of the ongoing history of British theatre. Before 2019, all productions, their casts, author and full production credits were indexed annually; from 2019, the website provides a search engine functionality to browse through all of these listings.

Theatre Record also covers festivals and seasons such as the Edinburgh Festival (official and fringe) and the London International Mime Festival. This was originally done in special supplements. From 2020 until 2022, doollee.com was also included in the magazine.

As well as the theatre-going public, critics and arts editors, it goes to all major organisations working for the theatre industry including theatre administrators; companies and their directors; and agents and their clients. In addition, its circulation to drama schools, colleges and universities makes it available to the industry's next generation. It is also widely read in Europe and the US, in Israel and Japan, Australia and New Zealand.

== History ==
From 1981 to 1990 it was published as the London Theatre Record. The magazine was edited and published fortnightly, and was edited and published online by Julian Oddy until January 2022, after which Alison Cook took over as editor. In June 2022 a new website was launched.

A history of Theatre Record, written by its founding editor Ian Herbert, originally delivered as a lecture for the Society for Theatre Research on 18 January 2005, is available on the website.
