= Aleks Sierz =

British theatre critic

- Education: Manchester University; University of Westminster
- Occupation: Theatre critic
- Notable work: In-Yer-Face Theatre: British Drama Today (2001)
- Website: sierz.co.uk

Aleks Sierz is a British theatre critic. He is known for popularising the term "In-yer-face theatre", which was the title of a book he published in 2001.

== Biography ==
Sierz was educated at Manchester University and holds a PhD from Westminster University. He works as a freelance writer and has written for publications including Tribune, The Arts Desk and The Stage, as well as newspapers such as The Independent. He co-edits Theatre Voice.

He is a visiting professor at Rose Bruford College, and has been a lecturer on Boston University's "Study Abroad" programme in London.

== Books ==
Sierz's publications include:

- In-Yer-Face Theatre: British Drama Today (Faber, 2001), ISBN 978-0-571-20049-8
- The Theatre of Martin Crimp (Methuen, 2006)
- John Osborne's Look Back in Anger (Continuum, 2008)
- Rewriting the Nation: British Theatre Today (Methuen, 2011), ISBN 978-1408112380
- Modern British Playwriting: The 1990s: Voices, Documents, New Interpretations (Methuen, 2012), ISBN 978-1408129265
- With Lia Ghilardi, The Time Traveller's Guide to British Theatre: The First Four Hundred Years (Oberon Books, 2015), ISBN 978-1783192083
