= Nottingham New Theatre =

Theatre on University Park Campus, Nottingham, England

Coordinates: 52°56′17.2″N 1°11′45.4″W

The Nottingham New Theatre
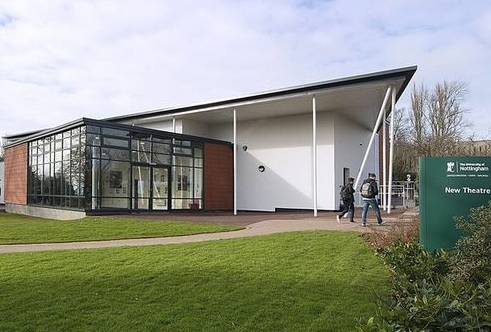
- Main entrance to the building
- Interactive map of The Nottingham New Theatre
- Address: University Park Campus; Nottingham; United Kingdom
- Capacity: 86 seats in main space, variable seating in studios

Construction
- Rebuilt: Archaeology building demolished and theatre renovated and extended over the summer of 2012
- Years active: 1966 - 2023

Website
- newtheatre.org.uk

The Nottingham New Theatre was formerly a playhouse on the University Park Campus, Nottingham, England, which closed in 2023. It was the only entirely student-run theatre in England.

The associated production company of the same name continues to operate out of the Portland Studio on the same campus. It is funded in part by the University of Nottingham Students' Union and constitutes one of the union's eight student-run services.

== History ==
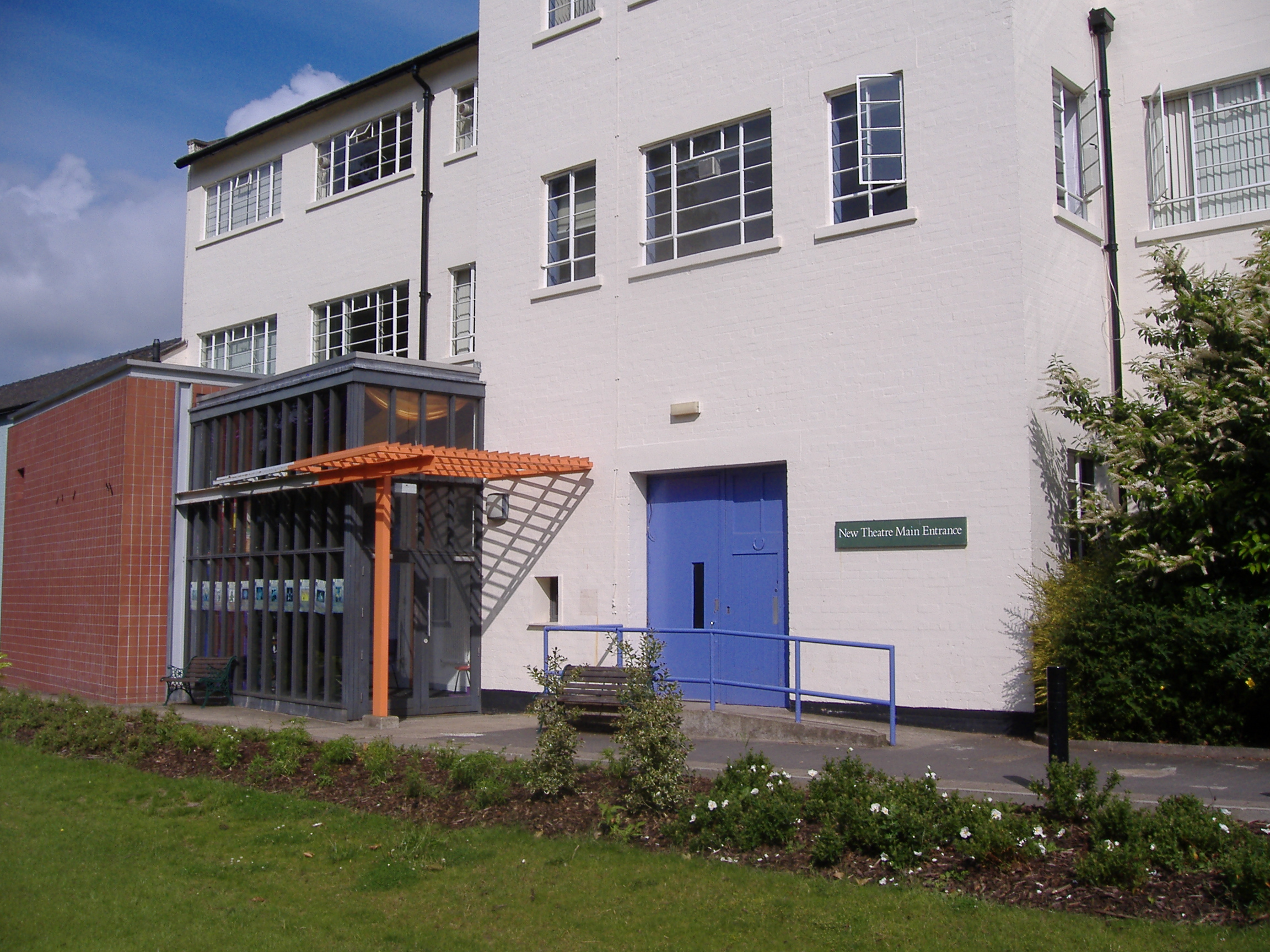
The main entrance to the New Theatre in 2008.

The New Theatre was established in 1969, and was originally housed in the Archaeology and Classics building of the University of Nottingham. In 2001 an extended foyer was added to the building, following a donation from an alumnus of the university.

The summer of 2012 saw an extensive redevelopment of the building housing the New Theatre. The former Archaeology and Classics building was demolished from the site; leaving the New Theatre as a freestanding building. Parts of the old building were retained and repurposed as new rehearsal rooms, and a studio space; as well as a significant remodeling of the dressing room, and extending the foyer.

In April 2015, the Nottingham New Theatre history project was launched. This is the theatre's archival website, holding information from shows dating back to the 1950s including posters, cast and crew lists and production shots. The summer of 2015 saw the launch of the Student Fringe Festival, or StuFF. This festival aims to bring together both experimental and classical theatre in a two-day festival held in June each year.

The theatre closed in 2023 after water damage made the building unsafe. An alumni campaign to reopen the theatre was launched in 2026 by broadcaster Matthew Bannister, joined by actors Theo James and Ruth Wilson and BBC presenter Emma Barnett, after Bannister discovered that the theatre had closed when invited to an event celebrating 100 years of drama at the university. The Times described the theatre in 2026 as "filthy and derelict". The university have ruled out restoring the theatre and said that this would cost £2 million.

== Organisation and structure ==
All aspects of the theatre are run by the 21 members of the New Theatre committee, although the producer and director of individual shows are given a large degree of autonomy with regards to their productions.

The theatre's productions are open to the public and any student at the University of Nottingham can become a member. Members receive discounts on theatre tickets and can get involved in running the theatre. Each semester a 'proposals meeting' is held by the committee at which members can suggest a play that they wish to direct. Once the upcoming season's plays are chosen by the committee, auditions are held by the production team of each play. As soon as the plays have been cast at the 'casting meeting', production teams are given a budget by the theatre treasurer and allowed a certain amount of autonomy, with the support of the relevant season's Co-ordinator on hand if they need it.

Each play is expected to break even but many make a profit that is then channelled back into improving the theatre's facilities and offering more varied experiences for its members.

The President of the Nottingham New Theatre is mandated to report to and answer questions from the Students' Union Council.

== Edinburgh Fringe ==
Each year, the New Theatre takes one or more 'official' shows to the Edinburgh Festival Fringe and supports any number of shows being performed and produced at the fringe by its members. In 2007, these shows included an adaptation of 'Alice Through the Looking Glass'(New Theatre), 'Dearly Deported' by Charles Brafman (Ankle Productions) and 'Slippery Soapbox: Spotbanded Skat' (ShutYOface Productions).

In 2008, the New Theatre took two shows; an ensemble devised piece ('Crossing The Rubicon', C Soco Chambers Street 12pm), and a piece of new writing by Anthony Lau ('Cross-Stitching', C Soco Chambers Street 1pm) officially. Also performing were Ribcaged Productions Ltd ('The Bear Who Paints'), Ankle Productions ('The Third Condiment'), Chimera Theatre Group ('Vivien') and Cicero Productions ('Written Off'), their casts and crew being New Theatre members and alumni.

In 2009, the New Theatre took Warehouse 364, written and directed by Andy McNamee, who stepped into a role for one performance when a cast member was unable to perform.

In 2010, the New Theatre took two shows; Only One Wing, written by Lizzie Bourne and directed by Andy McNamee, and The Retreat, written by Jenni Herzberg and directed by Becky Caitlin.

In 2011, the New Theatre took another two shows: Beef written by Rose Williams and directed by Liz Stevenson, Chasing Dragons written by Adam H. Wells and directed by Dan Rae-Scott (both performed at C SoCo).

In 2010 and 2011, Paulden Productions (co-founded by former New Theatre president Matt Leventhall) took FRESHER: The Musical to the fringe, where it won several accolades, including Musical Theatre Matters award for "Best New Musical".

In 2012, the New Theatre continued taking two productions with; The Hand-Me-Down People written and directed by Adam H. Wells (performed at C Nova) and Porphyria written by Craig Wilmann, and co-directed by Matt Wilks and Tom Barnes (performed at Zoo Southside).

In 2016, the New Theatre enjoyed one of its most successful Fringe residencies, with its production of The Great Gatsby by F. Scott Fitzgerald and Tyrannosaurus Sketch receiving 4-star reviews and enjoying sell out runs. An independent production also came to Edinburgh in association with the New Theatre: The Toyland Murders by the Kite Tail Theatre Company. It enjoyed critical and commercial success.

In 2017, the New Theatre took two devised pieces, Escape for Dummies and Wrecked. Both enjoyed critical and commercial success, with Escape for Dummies gaining 5 star reviews.

In 2018, the New Theatre again took two productions, Working Class Hero written by Ben Standish and directed by Felicity Chilver, and The Devil You Know written and directed by Emma Summerton. These productions took place at Greenside @ Infirmary Street.

In 2019, two more productions were taken to the Fringe, Order from Chaos written and directed by Jonny Khan, and Franz and Marie: Woyzeck Retold written and directed by Daniel Mcvey. These productions also took place at Greenside @ Infirmary Street. Both shows were met with critical success with Order From Chaos receiving 5-star reviews.

In 2021, two productions were taken to Fringe, Madhouse written and directed by Maddie Craig, and It's Not Rocket Science written and directed by Cecilia Alexander.

In 2022, the New Theatre took two productions to the Fringe, The Lacehouse written and directed by Amalia Costa, and The Conversation written and directed by Syania Shaharuddin. These productions took place at TheSpace on North Bridge's Perth Theatre.

== National Student Drama Festival ==
In 2007 and 2008, New Theatre entered a number of shows into the National Student Drama Festival (NSDF? competition. In both years two productions were selected by the NSDF judges as finalists and were performed at the Festival in Scarborough. In 2008 the theatre's shows 'Disco Pigs' and 'Proof' won 6 awards between them, with the theatre also receiving the 'Judges' Award for Promoting Student Theatre'.

"The NSDF, however, is about drama, not drama students, and a university with no theatre studies at all had two shows in performance. Nottingham University presented an in-the-round version of Enda Walsh’s violent, despairing Disco Pigs, and a polished production of the American David Auburn’s recent West End success Proof. Directed by a student of industrial economics, a cast consisting of a physicist, an English major, a sociologist and a student of Spanish and Portuguese became convincing Chicagoans in a coolly filmic study of family relations. The linguist Anna Wheatley won the Spotlight award for best actress as the daughter who bears the curse of inheriting her father’s mathematical genius, and Guy Unsworth, who designed the atmospheric set as well as directing the excellent cast, won the Directors' Guild award." (Robert Hewison,© Copyright 2008 Times Newspapers Ltd.)

In 2011, four separate shows from New Theatre were selected by NSDF, from a total of 13 shows nationally. These included: After the End, Orphans, Bluebird and This Wide Night. The company went on to win four awards at NSDF 2011: three Judges' awards for acting, one to Douggie McMeekin (Orphans), and two to Meg Salter and Lucy Bromilow (both for This Wide Night) respectively, and Best Design for After the End.

In 2013, three shows were selected from the Nottingham New Theatre by NSDF, from a total of 11 shows nationally. These included: Memory of Water by Shelagh Stephenson, Mercury Fur by Philip Ridley and Jerusalem by Jez Butterworth.

In 2015, the production of The Ritual Slaughter of Gorge Mastromas by Dennis Kelly was selected by NSDF. It won The Festgoers Award, voted for by all the participants of the festival.

The following year, the Nottingham New Theatre had two shows selected by NSDF. These included, West by Steven Berkoff and The Toyland Murders, a student-written puppet show by Ben Hollands. The company won three acting awards for Shannon Smith (West), Becca Jones (West) and James Roscow (The Toyland Murders and West).

For the 2018 festival, a production of Pomona by Alistair McDowall was selected to perform, with Jonny Khan receiving a Commendation for acting.

In 2019, the New Theatre had two shows selected by the NSDF. These were: 'A Girl Is A Half-Formed Thing' by Eimear McBride, adapted by Annie Ryan; and 'Rotterdam' by Jon Brittain. Maddy Strauss received a Commendation for acting.

== Alumni ==
- Ruth Wilson, Bafta-nominated and Golden Globe-winning actress
- Ruth Bratt
- Matthew Bannister
- Theo James, of Bedlam, The Inbetweeners, and Golden Boy fame
- James Bentley
- Carrie Cracknell
- Haydn Gwynne
- Michael Longhurst, director of Constellations on Broadway starring Ruth Wilson and Jake Gyllenhaal
- Tom Copley
- Daniel Weyman
- Emma Barnett
- Paul Kerensa
- Clive Tyldesley
