= Ella Road =

British writer (born 1991)

Ella Road (née Waldman; born 24 August 1991) is a British screenwriter, playwright, writer, and actress. She is best known for her stage-play The Phlebotomist, and for her work on Black Mirror.

== Career ==
Road grew up in Archway, London, and attended Dame Alice Owen's School, a state school in Potters Bar. She studied English at Somerville College, Oxford, and then earned a postgraduate degree in acting from Oxford School of Drama. According to The Daily Telegraph, Road began writing her first play soon after completing her acting training to find more creative agency.

=== Theatre ===
In 2018 Road's debut play The Phlebotomist premiered at Hampstead Theatre, directed by Sam Yates and starring Jade Anouka. The play is work of science-fiction exploring questions around genetic ethics. In 2019 The Phlebotomist received an Olivier Award nomination for Outstanding Achievement in an Affiliate Theatre, and was a finalist for the Susan Smith Blackburn Prize. Later that year Road adapted it into a radio drama for BBC Radio 3. In 2020 the play was translated into German under the title Die Laborantin, leading to productions across Germany and Austria, and it became the most performed new play in the German language of 2021.

In December 2021 Road's play Fair Play premiered at the Bush Theatre in London, produced in association with Sonia Friedman Productions. It opened to widespread acclaim, but a resurgence of COVID19 lead the theatre to close, which limited its run. Fair Play explores the scrutinisation of women's bodies in sport, focusing on the experience of women athletes banned under IOC guidelines for having naturally elevated testosterone levels. In writing the script Road drew on her own experience as a competitive runner, and also developed the play in partnership with Intersex UK. The international release of a filmed online stream of the production was announced for 2022.

In 2026 it was announced that Road would be writing Robota, the inaugural show for the Schwarzman Centre, a new £185m arts venue that is also home to the University of Oxford’s humanities faculties, including the Institute for Ethics in AI. Blending research with theatre, Robota is a reimagining of R.U.R. by Karel Čapek, the 1920 play which introduced the word 'Robot' to the world. Robota is produced by theatre company Headlong.

=== Television ===
Road wrote episodes four and eight of Ten Percent, the British remake of the French comedy series Call My Agent! on Amazon Prime.

Road co-wrote, alongside Chris Chibnall, "Legend of the Sea Devils", the second episode of the 2022 specials for Doctor Who.

In 2024 it was announced that Road would be working on Black Mirror, for Netflix. In April 2025 "Eulogy", the episode she co-wrote alongside Charlie Brooker, was released as the fifth episode of Black Mirror Season 7, starring Paul Giamatti. "Eulogy" received critical acclaim and was described by the BBC as "the anthology's most heartfelt and quietly devastating episode ever". Road and Brooker were nominated for a Hollywood Creative Alliance Astra TV Award for writing the episode. The Season was nominated for a Primetime Emmy Award for Best Limited or Anthology Series at the 77th Emmy Awards, and for a Golden Globe at the 2026 Golden Globe Awards. Paul Giamatti was nominated for a Golden Globe Award for Best Actor – Miniseries or Television Film for his performance in "Eulogy".
