= Non-zero =

Non-zero or nonzero may refer to:

- Non-zero dispersion-shifted fiber, a type of single-mode optical fiber
- Non zero one, artist collective from London, England
- Non-zero-sum game, used in game theory and economic theory
- Non Zero Sumness, 2002 album by Planet Funk
- In mathematics, a non-zero element is any element of an algebraic structure other than the zero element.
- Nonzero: The Logic of Human Destiny, 1999 book by Robert Wright
- Nonzero Records, independent record label based in Sydney, Australia

== See also ==
- 0 (number)
- Null (disambiguation)
