= Bush Theatre =

Theatre in Shepherd's Bush, London, England

- Official Logo
- Interactive map of Bush Theatre
- Address: Shepherd's Bush; London, W12; United Kingdom
- Coordinates: 51.5052°N 0.2259°W
- Owner: Alternative Theatre Company
- Capacity: Theatre: 180 seats Studio: 70 seats
- Type: Theatre
- Production: Seasons of guest and commissioned productions
- Public transit: Shepherd's Bush Market; Shepherd's Bush

Construction
- Opened: 6 April 1972; 54 years ago

Website
- bushtheatre.co.uk

The Bush Theatre is located in the Passmore Edwards Public Library, Shepherd's Bush, in the London Borough of Hammersmith and Fulham. It was established in 1972 as a showcase for the work of new writers.

== Artistic Directors ==
- Brian McDermott and Nicholas Newton (1972-1975)
- Peter Wilson (1975-1977)
- Jenny Topper (1977–1988), jointly with Nicky Pallot (1979–1990)
- Dominic Dromgoole (1990–1996)
- Mike Bradwell (1996–2007)
- Josie Rourke (2007–2012)
- Madani Younis (2011–2018)
- Lynette Linton (2019–2025)
- Taio Lawson (2025–Present)

== History ==
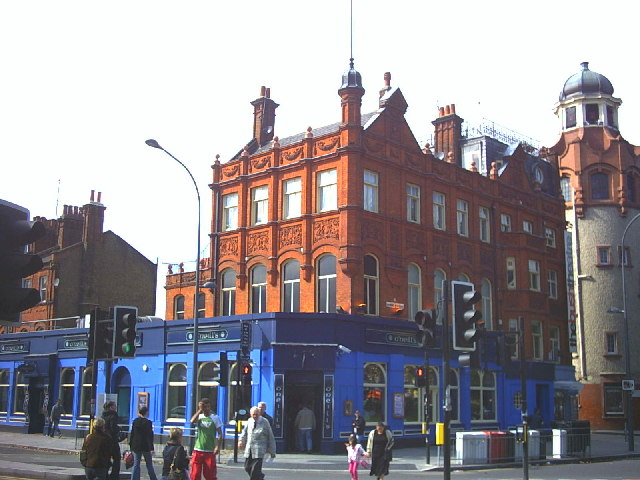
The Bush Theatre's original home (2005)

On Thursday 6 April 1972, the Bush Theatre was established above The Bush public house on the corner of Goldhawk Road and Shepherd's Bush Green, in what was once the dance studio of Lionel Blair. It was established by a maverick actor, Brian McDermott, who used to tour the Fringe, and was shortly joined by theatre producer Nicholas Newton. The venue, despite its fame and massive output, was intimate, with a maximum audience of approximately 80. The first production was an adaption of The Collector by John Fowles, directed by John Neville and starring Annette Andre and Brian McDermott; it had previously played at the King's Head Theatre. During the next three years they produced over 30 productions including the musical Dick Deterred by David Edgar and Lindsay Kemp's Flowers both at the Bush Theatre and then at the ICA Theatre.

Throughout 1992, the Bush Theatre celebrated 20 years at the frontier of new writing. "What has held the Bush together for 20 years? Blind faith, youthful commitment and a tenacious belief in new writing: above all, perhaps, the conviction that new work deserves the highest standards in acting, direction and design", wrote The Guardian. The Bush won The Empty Space Award for the year's work, which included Billy Roche's Bush plays A Handful Of Stars, Poor Beast in the Rain and Belfry playing in repertory as The Wexford Trilogy, which toured to Wexford Opera House and the Abbey Theatre, Dublin.

In November 2010, the Bush Theatre announced it would be leaving its home of nearly forty years and moving to the former Passmore Edwards Public Library building, round the corner from its first home, on Uxbridge Road.

The relocation took place in 2011 and the new venue opened with the "Sixty-Six Books" project. This was a celebration of the anniversary of the publication of the King James Bible, which used 66 writers, many of whom were veterans of the Bush.

That same year, Artistic Director Josie Rourke announced her departure from the Bush to take up the position of Artistic Director of the Donmar Warehouse. The Board appointed Madani Younis as her successor from January 2012. In 2013, he programmed the theatre's most successful season to date, which saw the theatre play to 99% capacity.

In Spring 2016, the Bush Theatre relocated its plays to found spaces around Shepherd's Bush and Notting Hill, as the former library building closed for the largest capital project in the theatre's history. Borrowing new and iconic spaces with their own histories and tales of the local community, this season of work welcomed new audiences and residents by offering a number of free and subsidised theatre tickets to local people.

In March 2017, following a landmark year of taking plays into the communities of West London, the Bush Theatre returned home following a £4.3m revitalisation of the venue. The year-long redevelopment was driven by the aim of realising Younis’ vision for a theatre that reflected the diversity and vibrancy of London. Upon reopening, the building was to be more sustainable and entirely accessible, with a new entrance, front-of-house area and exterior garden terrace to the main street.

Lynette Linton became Artistic Directory in January 2019, following Younis' appointment as Creative Director at the Southbank Centre. That same year, the theatre was named London Theatre of the Year by The Stage.

In response to the COVID-19 pandemic, the Bush Theatre filmed several of its productions and offered them to online viewers.

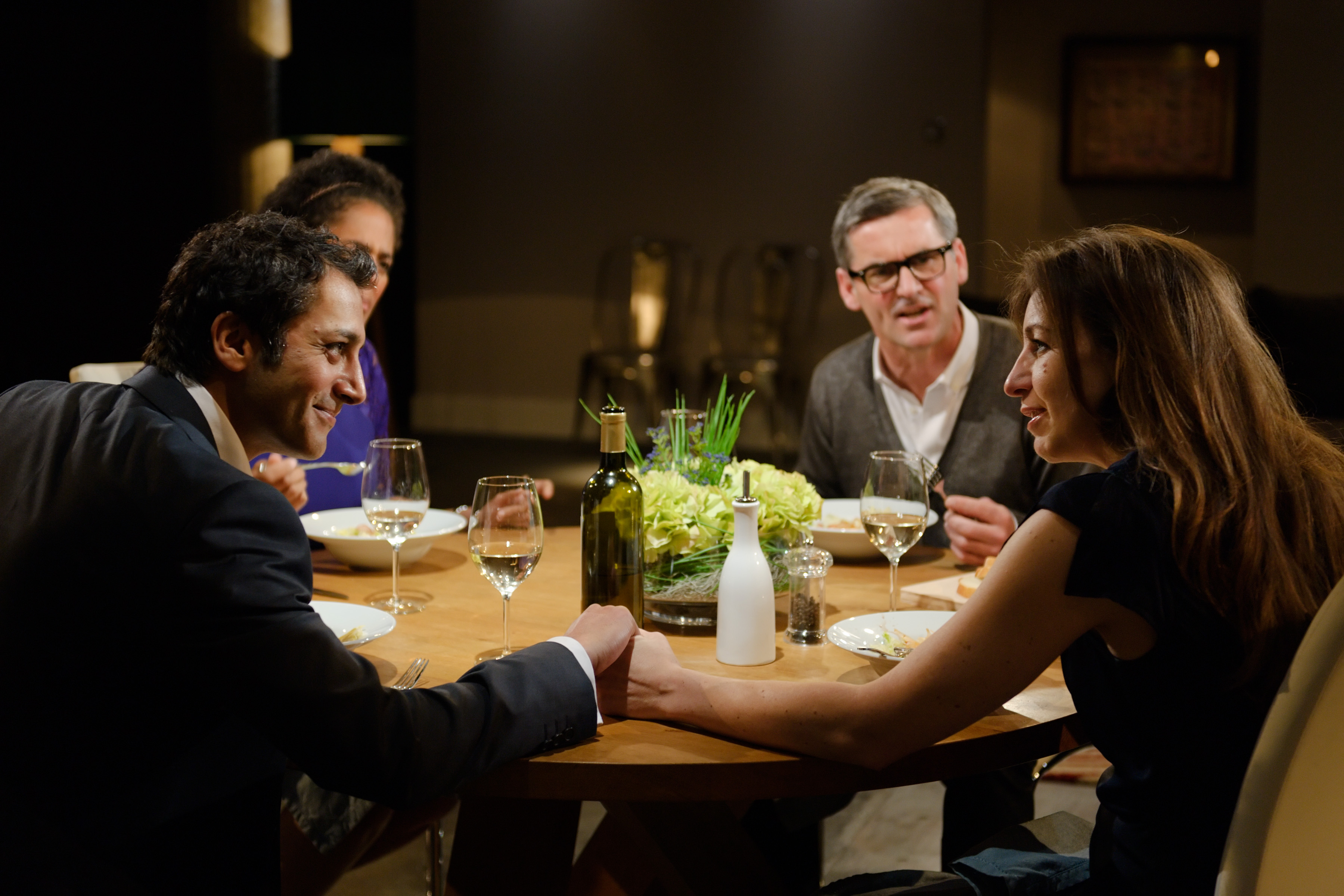
The Bush Theatre's 2013 production of Pulitzer Prize for Drama winner Disgraced by Ayad Akhtar

== Venue ==
Following the 2016/17 redevelopment, the Bush Theatre has two performance spaces:

- The Theatre, a reserved seating venue with a maximum capacity of 180. It has remained in its original location and can be configured in a thrust, end on or in the round layout.
- The Studio, an unreserved seating venue with a maximum capacity of 70, is a home for emerging artists and producers. Similarly, this space can be configured in a thrust, end on or in the round layout.

The building also contains an Attic rehearsal space and Writer's Room, along with a Café Bar, garden terrace and playtext library, which is the largest public theatre reference library in the United Kingdom.

The redevelopment of the venue was 'Cultural Project of the Year' finalist at the AJ Architecture Awards 2017, and 'Highly commended Cultural Building' at the AJ Retrofit Awards 2017, and selected by the Hammersmith Society as winner of their Conservation Award for 2017.

== New writing ==
The Literary Department at the Bush Theatre is committed to discovering new plays from playwrights from the widest range of backgrounds and therefore seek unsolicited submissions throughout the year in dedicated script windows. Chosen plays reflect the contemporary culture of London, the UK and beyond. The Department receives nearly 2000 scripts a year from new and established playwrights, all of which are read and considered for production or development at the Bush.

=== Bush Writers Group ===
The Bush Writers’ Group (formerly known as the Emerging Writers’ Group) is a development programme run by the Bush Theatre to support early-career writers, with participants selected through a competitive open application process. Several alumni have had work produced at the Bush and have gone on to receive wider professional recognition within the theatre industry.

Year	Artistic Director	Cohort	Sources
2025	Taio Lawson	Wisdom Charis; Sara Dawood; Josh Dhillon; Ashlee Elizabeth-Lolo; Kathryn Golding; Roberta Livingston; Angela O’Callaghan; Razak Osman	
2023	Lynette Linton	Kaleya Baxe; Yasmine Dankwah; Aaron Kilercioglu; Lare Ofeyusi; Mwansa Phiri; Tanya Shamil	
2022	Lynette Linton	Valerie Isaiah Sadoh; Temi Majekodunmi; Jasmin Mandi-Ghomi; Ted Marriott; Coral Wylie; Zak Ismail	
2021	Lynette Linton	Nicole Acquah; Georgia Green; Dilan Raithatha; Lydia Sabatini; Jilly Sumsion; Diyan Zora	
2020/21	Lynette Linton	Sophia Griffin; Holly Rose Hawgood; Kwame Owusu; Nikhil Parmar; Beru Tessema; Kit Withington	
2019/20	Lynette Linton	Ava Wong Davies; Casey Bailey; Tife Kusoro; Will Jackson; Benedict Lombe; Natasha Simone	
2017/18	Madani Younis	Kelly Marie Jones; Tom Wentworth; Robyn Addison; Afsaneh Gray	
2016	Madani Younis	Tristan Bernays; Tristan Fynn-Aiduenu; Kamal Kaan; Jessica Sian; A. C. Smith; Camilla Whitehill	
2015	Madani Younis	Josh Azouz; Lily Bevan; Sevan Greene; Nabihah Islam; Gemma Rogers; Sophie Wu	

== Productions ==
A list of selected productions of the Bush Theatre.

=== Productions in the 2020s ===
Year	Title	Playwright(s)	Notes
2025	After Sunday	Sophia Griffin	Co-commissioned with Coventry Belgrade Theatre
2025	Superwoman Schema	Emma Dennis-Edwards	Starring Golda Rosheuvel and Letitia Wright
2025	MAKE ME FEEL	Will Jackson	
2025	Miss Myrtle’s Garden	Danny James King	
2025	Speed	Mohamed-Zain Dada	
2025	…blackbird hour	babirye bukilwa	
2024-2025	Lavender, Hyacinth, Violet, Yew	Coral Wylie	Starring Omari Douglas
2024	The Cord	Bijan Sheibani	
2024	My Father's Fable	Faith Omole	Omole's debut production.
2024	The Real Ones	Waleed Akhtar	Starring Nathaniel Curtis
2024	Wolves on Road	Beru Tessema	
2024	Lady Dealer	Martha Watson Allpress	
2024	Statues	Azan Ahmed	
2024	Tender	Eleanor Tindall	
2024	The End	Jasmin Mandi-Gho	
2024	Shifters	Benedict Lombe	Starring Tosin Cole and Heather Agyepong. Transfer to West End Duke of York's Theatre in 2024. Nominated for Best New Play at the 2025 Laurence Olivier Awards.
2023	Feeling Afraid As If Something Terrible is Going to Happen	Marcelo Dos Santos	
2023	Elephant	Anoushka Lucas	
2023	Red Pitch	Tyrell Williams	
2023	A Playlist for the Revolution	AJ Yi	
2023	Dreaming and Drowning	Kwame Owusu	
2023	This Might Not Be It	Sophia Chetin-Leuner	
2023	As We Face The Sun	Kit Withington	
2023	August In England	Lenny Henry	Henry's playwrighting debut; also starring Henry as August Henderson.
2023	Sleepova	Matilda Feyisayo Ibini	
2022-2023	Paradise Now!	Margaret Perry	
2022	House of Ife	Beru Tessema	
2022	Favour	Ambreen Razia	
2022	The P Word	Waleed Akhtar	
2022	Invisible	Nikhil Parmar	
2022	Clutch	Will Jackson	
2022	Elephant	Anoushka Lucas	
2022	The Kola Nut Does Not Speak English	Tania Nwachukwu	
2022	Red Pitch	Tyrell Williams	
2022	Horizon	Kwame Owusu	
2021-2022	Fair Play	Ella Road	
2021	Old Bridge	Igor Memic	
2021	Overflow	Travis Alabanza	
2021	Lava	Benedict Lombe	
2021	Keep a Light on For Those Who Are Lost	Titas Halder	
2021	Harm	Phoebe Eclair Powell	
2021	10 Nights	Shahid Iqbal Khan	
2021	Pink Lemonade	Mika Onyx Johnson	

=== Productions in the 2010s ===
- 2019 Chiaroscuro by Jackie Kay
- 2019 Baby Reindeer by Richard Gadd
- 2019 I Wanna Be Yours by Zia Ahmed
- 2019 The Arrival by Bijan Sheibani
- 2019 Strange Fruit by Caryl Phillips
- 2018 Misty by Arinzé Kene
- 2018 Leave Taking by Winsome Pinnock
- 2018 Dismantle Festival by Project 2036
- 2017 The Hijabi Monologues by Amal Abdi, Hanan Issa, Sahar Ullah and Nimmo Ismail
- 2016 The Royale by Marco Ramirez
- 2016 Boys Will Be Boys by Melissa Bubnic
- 2016 Right Now by Catherine-Anne Toupin
- 2016 Pink Mist by Owen Sheers
- 2015 Forget Me Not by Tom Holloway
- 2015 RADAR 2015
- 2015 F*ck the Polar Bears by Tanya Ronder
- 2015 The Invisible by Rebecca Lenkiewicz
- 2015 The Angry Brigade by James Graham
- 2015 The Royale by Marco Ramirez
- 2015 Islands by Caroline Horton
- 2014 Visitors by Barney Norris
- 2014 Albion by Chris Thompson
- 2014 RADAR 2014
- 2014 Perseverance Drive by Robin Soans
- 2014 Incognito by Nick Payne
- 2014 We Are Proud to Present a Presentation by the Herero of Namibia, formerly known as South West Africa, from the German Sud-Ouest Afrika Between the Years 1895 – 1915 by Jackie Sibblies-Drury
- 2014 Ciphers by Dawn King
- 2013 Jumpers for Goalposts by Tom Wells
- 2013 RADAR 2013
- 2013 The Herd by Rory Kinnear
- 2013 Josephine and I by Cush Jumbo
- 2013 Disgraced by Ayad Akhtar (Winner of the Pulitzer Prize for Drama)
- 2013 Three Birds by Janice Okoh
- 2013 Money the game show by Clare Duffy
- 2012 Straight by D. C. Moore
- 2012 Snookered by Ishy Din
- 2012 Chalet Lines by Lee Mattinson
- 2012 The Beloved by Amir Nizar Zuabi
- 2012 Mad About the Boy by Gbolahan Obisesan
- 2012 Fear by Dominic Savage
- 2012 Our New Girl by Nancy Harris
- 2011 The Kitchen Sink by Tom Wells
- 2011 Sixty-Six Books by Sixty-Six Writers
- 2011 This is where we got to when you came in by non zero one
- 2011 Where's My Seat? by Dierdre Kinahan, Tom Wells and Jack Thorne
- 2011 In The Beginning by Nick Payne
- 2011 Moment by Deirdre Kinahan
- 2011 Little Platoons by Steve Waters
- 2011 The Knowledge by John Donnelly
- 2010 My Romantic History by D C Jackson
- 2010 The Aliens by Annie Baker
- 2010 The Great British Country Fete by Russell Kane and Michael Bruce
- 2010 Like A Fishbone by Anthony Weigh
- 2010 A Little Gem by Elaine Murphy
- 2010 Eigengrau by Penelope Skinner
- 2010 The Whisky Taster by James Graham

=== Productions in the 2000s ===
- 2009 The Contingency Plan by Steve Waters
- 2009 The Stefan Golaszewski Plays by Stefan Golaszewski
- 2009 If There Is I Haven't Found It Yet by Nick Payne
- 2009 Sea Wall by Simon Stephens
- 2009 2 May 1997 by Jack Thorne
- 2009 suddenlossofdignity.com by Zawe Ashton, James Graham, Joel Horwood, Morgan Lloyd Malcolm & Michelle Terry
- 2009 Apologia by Alexi Kaye Campbell
- 2009 Stovepipe by Adam Brace
- 2009 Wrecks by Neil LaBute
- 2008 50 Ways to Leave your Lover at Christmas by Leah Chillery, Ben Ellis, Stacey Gregg, Lucy Kirkwood, Morgan Lloyd Malcolm & Ben Schiffer
- 2008 I Caught Crabs in Walberswick by Joel Horwood
- 2008 Broken Space Season by Neil LaBute, Bryony Lavery, Simon Stephens, Declan Feenan, Mike Bartlett, Nancy Harris, Lucy Kirkwood, Ben Schiffer, Jack Thorne & Anthony Weigh
- 2008 Turf by Simon Vinnicombe
- 2008 50 Ways to Leave Your Lover by Leah Chillery, Ben Ellis, Stacey Gregg, Lucy Kirkwood & Ben Schiffer
- 2008 2,000 Feet Away by Anthony Weigh
- 2008, Tinderbox by Lucy Kirkwood
- 2008 Artefacts by Mike Bartlett
- 2008 Helter Skelter/Land of the Dead by Neil LaBute
- 2007 tHe dYsFUnCKshOnalZ! by Mike Packer
- 2007 How To Curse by Ian McHugh
- 2007 Flight Path by David Watson
- 2007 Trance by Shoji Kokami
- 2007 Elling by Simon Bent
- 2007 Tom Fool by Franz Xaver Kroetz
- 2007 I Like Mine With a Kiss by Georgia Fitch
- 2007 Product: World Remix by Mark Ravenhill
- 2007 What Would Judas Do by Stewart Lee
- 2006 Whipping It Up by Stephen Thompson
- 2006 Bones by Kay Adshead
- 2006 Pumpgirl by Abbie Spallen
- 2006 Cruising by Alecky Blythe
- 2006 Crooked by Catherine Trieschmann
- 2006 Trad by Mark Doherty
- 2006 Christmas Is Miles Away by Chloe Moss
- 2006 Try These On For International Size by Reg Cribb, Jón Atli Jónasson, Abbie Spallen, Shoji Kokami
- 2006 Monsieur Ibrahim and the Flowers Of The Qur'an by Eric-Emmanuel Schmitt
- 2005 When You Cure Me by Jack Thorne
- 2005 Bottle Universe by Simon Burt
- 2005 After the End by Dennis Kelly
- 2005 The Obituary Show by The People Show
- 2005 Kingfisher Blue by Lin Coghlan
- 2005 Mammals by Amelia Bullmore
- 2005 Take Me Away by Gerald Murphy
- 2005 Bites by Kay Adshead
- 2004 Going Donkeys by Richard Cameron
- 2004 How Love Is Spelt by Chloe Moss
- 2004 Damages by Steve Thompson
- 2004 Adrenalin...Heart by Georgia Fitch
- 2004 One Minute by Simon Stephens
- 2004 Christmas by Simon Stephens
- 2003 The God Botherers by Richard Bean
- 2003 Airsick by Emma Frost
- 2003 Nine Parts of Desire by Heather Raffo
- 2003 Little Baby Nothing by Catherine Johnson

=== Productions in the 1990s ===
- 1999 Howie the Rookie by Mark O'Rowe
- 1998 "Martin and John" by Sean O'Neil adapted from Dale Peck's novel
- 1998 "Love Upon the Throne" by Patrick Barlow
- 1997 Disco Pigs by Enda Walsh
- 1997 Love and Understanding by Joe Penhall
- 1997 St Nicholas by Conor McPherson
- 1997 All of You Mine by Richard Cameron
- 1991 The Pitchfork Disney by Philip Ridley

=== Productions in the 1980s ===
- 1988 A Handful of Stars by Billy Roche
- 1987 Dreams of San Francisco by Jacqueline Holborough
- 1987 It's A Girl by John Burrow
- 1987 Tattoo Theatre by Mladen Materic
- 1987 The Mystery of the Rose Bouquet by Mauel Puig
- 1987 Effies Burning by Valerie Windsor
- 1987 People Show No 92 Whistle Stop by People Show
- 1987 Love Field by Stephen Davis
- 1987 More Light by Snoo Wilson
- 1987 An Imitation of Life by Abbie Spallen
- 1986 The Oven Glove Murders by Nick Darke
- 1986 Making Noise Quietly by Robert Holman
- 1985 Kiss of the Spider Woman by Manuel Puig
- 1983 Hard Feelings by Doug Lucie
- 1980 Duet for One by Tom Kempinski

=== Productions in the 1970s ===
- 1975 City Sugar by Stephen Poliakoff (then West End)
- 1975 Hitting Town by Stephen Poliakoff
- 1974 Dick Deterred by David Edgar (then ICA Theatre)
- 1974 Flowers by Lindsay Kemp (then West End)
- 1973 Under the Bamboo Tree by Tina Brown
- 1973 The Pope's Wedding by Edward Bond
- 1973 Tederella by David Edgar
- 1972 The Relief of Martha King by David Parker
- 1972 Christmas Carol by Frank Marcus
- 1972 Malcolm by Lewis Nkosi
- 1972 Plays for Rubber Gogo by Christopher Wilkinson
- 1972 The Collector by John Fowles adapted by David Parker

== Books ==
To celebrate 40 years of the Bush Theatre, "Close-Up Magic": 40 Years at the Bush Theatre was published, charting the history of the theatre and including contributions from past directors, actors, writers and audience members.

== Awards and nominations ==
=== Awards and nominations between 1970s and 1990s ===
Year	Award	Category	Awardee(s)	Work	Results	Refs
1977	George Devine Award		Robert Holman	German Skerries	Won	
1980	George Devine Award		Jonathan Gems	The Tax Exile	Won	
1983	Samuel Beckett Award		Kevin Elyot	Coming Clean	Won	
1986	Laurence Olivier Award	Outstanding Achievement	Robert Holman	Making Noises Quietly	Nominated	
1989	John Whiting Award		Billy Roche	A Handful of Stars	Won	
1993	Laurence Olivier Award	Outstanding Achievement	Billy Roche	The Wexford Trilogy	Nominated	
1993	Susan Smith Blackburn Prize		Jane Coles	Backstroke In A Crowded Pool	Won	
1993	John Whiting Award		Helen Edmundson	The Clearing	Won	
1994	John Whiting Award		Jonathan Harvey	Beautiful Thing	Won	
1995	Laurence Olivier Award	Best Comedy	Jonathan Harvey	Beautiful Thing	Nominated	
1996	Susan Smith Blackburn Prize		Naomi Wallace	One Flea Spare	Won	
1997	Meyer-Whitworth Award		Conor McPherson	This Lime Tree Bower	Won	
1998	George Devine Award		Helen Blakeman	Caravan	Won	
1998	Meyer-Whitworth Award		Daragh Carville	Language Roulette	Won	
1999	George Devine Award		Mark O'Rowe	Howie the Rookie	Won	

=== Awards and nominations in the 2000s ===
Year	Award	Category	Awardee(s)	Work	Results	Refs
2005	Meyer-Whitworth Award		Stephen Thompson	Damages	Won	
2006	Susan Smith Blackburn Prize		Amelia Bullmore	Mammals	Won	
2006	WhatsOnStage Award	Best New Comedy	Amelia Bullmore	Mammals	Nominated	
2007	Susan Smith Blackburn Prize		Abbie Spallen	Pumpgirl	Won	

=== Awards and nominations in the 2010s ===
Year	Award	Category	Awardee(s)	Work	Results	Refs
2013	The Groucho Club Maverick Award		Bush Theatre		Won	
2018	Laurence Olivier Award	Outstanding Achievement in Affiliate Theatre	Bush Theatre	The B*easts (Written and performed by Monica Dolan, directed by John Hoggarth)	Nominated	
2019	Stage Awards	London Theatre of the Year	Bush Theatre		Won	
2019	Laurence Olivier Award	Best New Play	Arinzé Kene (writer)	Misty	Nominated	
2019	Laurence Olivier Award	Best Actor	Arinzé Kene	Misty	Nominated	

=== Awards and nominations in the 2020s ===
Year	Award	Category	Awardee(s)	Work	Results	Refs
2020	Laurence Olivier Award	Outstanding Achievement in Affiliate Theatre	Bush Theatre	Baby Reindeer (Written and performed by Richard Gadd, directed by Jon Brittain)	Won	
2020	Stage Debut Awards	Best Writer	Temi Wilkey	The High Table	Won	
2022	Susan Smith Blackburn Prize		Benedict Lombe	Lava	Won	
2022	Critics’ Circle Theatre Awards	Most Promising Playwright	Igor Memic	Old Bridge	Won	
2022	Laurence Olivier Award	Outstanding Achievement in Affiliate Theatre	Bush Theatre	Old Bridge (Written by Igor Memic)	Won	
2022	Laurence Olivier Award	Outstanding Achievement in Affiliate Theatre	Bush Theatre	10 Nights (Written by Shahid Iqbal Khan)	Nominated	
2022	George Devine Award		Tyrell Williams	Red Pitch	Won	
2022	Stage Debut Awards	Best Writer	Tyrell Williams	Red Pitch	Won	
2022	Evening Standard Theatre Awards	Best play	Tyrell Williams	Red Pitch	Nominated	
2022	Evening Standard Theatre Awards	Most Promising Playwright	Tyrell Williams	Red Pitch	Won	
2022	Evening Standard Theatre Awards	Most Promising Playwright	Waleed Akhtar	The P Word	Nominated	
2022	Evening Standard Theatre Awards	Most Promising Playwright	Igor Memic	Old Bridge	Nominated	
2022	Stage Debut Awards	Best Performer in a Play	House of Ife	Michael Workeye	Nominated	
2022	Stage Debut Awards	Best Designer	Liz Whitbread (set and costume)	Favour	Nominated	
2022	Asian Media Awards	Best Stage Production	Ambreen Razia (writer)	Favour	Nominated	
2022	Asian Media Awards	Best Stage Production	Shahid Iqbal Khan (writer)	10 Nights	Nominated	
2023	Laurence Olivier Award	Outstanding Achievement in Affiliate Theatre	Bush Theatre	The P Word (Written and performed by Waleed Akhtar)	Won	
2023	Laurence Olivier Award	Outstanding Achievement in Affiliate Theatre	Bush Theatre	Paradise Now! (Written by Margaret Perry)	Nominated	
2023	Stage Awards	Theatre of the Year	Bush Theatre		Won	
2023	Stage Debut Awards	Best Writer	Anoushka Lucas	Elephant	Won	
2023	Stage Debut Awards	Best Writer	Lenny Henry	August in England	Nominated	
2023	Stage Debut Awards	Best Director	Emily Ling Williams	A Playlist for the Revolution	Won	
2023	Stage Debut Awards	Best Performer in a Play	Bukky Bakray	Sleepova	Nominated	
2023	Critics’ Circle Theatre Awards	Most Promising Playwright	Tyrell Williams	Red Pitch	Won	
2023	Evening Standard Theatre Awards	Most Promising Playwright	Anoushka Lucas	Elephant	Nominated	
2023	Evening Standard Theatre Awards	Most Promising Playwright	Matilda Feyiṣayọ Ibini	Sleepova	Nominated	
2023	Asian Media Awards	Best Stage Production	Waleed Akhtar (Writer)	The P Word	Nominated	
2023	Asian Media Awards	Outstanding Stage Performance	Waleed Akhtar (Performer)	The P Word	Nominated	
2023	Offies	Special awards: Producer	Bush Theatre		Won	
2023	Offies	New Play	Tyrell Williams	Red Pitch	Won	
2023	Offies	Most Promising New Playwright	Waleed Akhtar	The P Word	Won	
2023	Offies	Lead Performance in a Play	Esh Alladi	The P Word	Nominated	
2023	Offies	Best Performance Piece	Anoushka Lucas	Elephant	Nominated	
2023	Offies	Supporting Performance in a Play	Rina Fatania	Favour	Nominated	
2024	Laurence Olivier Award	Outstanding Achievement in Affiliate Theatre	Bush Theatre	Sleepova (Written by Matilda Feyiṣayọ Ibini)	Won	
2024	Laurence Olivier Award	Outstanding Achievement in Affiliate Theatre	Bush Theatre	A Playlist for the Revolution (Written by AJ Yi)	Nominated	
2024	Critics’ Circle Theatre Awards	Most Promising Playwright	Matilda Feyiṣayọ Ibini	Sleepova	Won	
2024	Offies	Best Solo Performance in a Play	Samuel Barnett	Feeling Afraid As If Something Terrible Is Going To Happen	Won	
2024	Offies	Community Outreach Youth	Bush Theatre	As We Face the Sun	Nominated	
2024	Black British Theatre Awards	Best Female Lead Actor	Tiwa Lade	My Father’s Fable	Won	
2024	Black British Theatre Awards	Best Book & Lyrics	Anoushka Lucas	Elephant	Nominated	
2024	Black British Theatre Awards	Disability Champion	Matilda Feyiṣayọ Ibini		Nominated	

== Bibliography ==
- Burkey, Neil (2011). "Close-Up Magic": 40 Years at the Bush Theatre. London: Profile Books Limited. ISBN 978-1906-50765-7.
