= Real Circumstance Theatre Company =

Real Circumstance Theatre Company is a not-for-profit theatre company based in Essex that delivers work nationally and internationally. Real Circumstance develops and produces new plays by emergent writers, and plays generated by the Company through improvisation. Real Circumstance is run by Artistic Director Dan Sherer and Creative Producer Anna Bewick.

Actors that Real Circumstance has worked with include Keeley Forsyth, Lawrence Werber, Ben Caplan, Jot Davies, Tamsin Joanna Kennard, Toby Sawyer, Kate Donmall, and Caroline Williams.

== Productions ==
- LIMBO by Declan Feenan, at Edinburgh Fringe Festival, York Theatre Royal, Arcola Theatre, and Mercury Theatre, Colchester (2007 / 2008).
- LOUGH/RAIN by Declan Feenan and Clara Brennan, at the Edinburgh Fringe Festival, York Theatre Royal, and The Junction Cambridge (2008).
- Our Share of Tomorrow by Dan Sherer, at the Edinburgh Fringe Festival and York Theatre Royal (2010).
- Under a Tree at the End of Time by Dan Sherer (forthcoming).

== Awards and Accolades ==
- The Metro's Pick of the Festival (Our Share of Tomorrow)
- Fringe Review's Editor's Choice at the Edinburgh Fringe (Our Share of Tomorrow)
- The Stage Awards for Acting Excellence: Best Actor nomination for Jot Davies (LOUGH/RAIN)
- The Stage Awards for Acting Excellence: Best Actress nomination for Kate Donmall (LOUGH/RAIN)
- The Scotsman's Hot Show at the Edinburgh Fringe (LIMBO)
- The Guardian's Pick of the Day (LIMBO)

== Associate Company ==
In August 2012, Real Circumstance became an Associate Company at the Lakeside Theatre, University of Essex.
