= DC Moore =

DC Moore may refer to:

- Detective Constable Moore, a character from Coronation Street
- D. C. Moore, a British playwright
