= Sam Yates =

British director (born 1983)

- Born: August 1983 (age 42–43); Stockport, United Kingdom
- Occupation: Director
- Notable work: Magpie; Agatha and the Curse of Ishtar
- Children: 1

Sam Yates (born August 1983) is an Olivier Award-winning British director working in theatre, film and television. He has been described as "a major talent" in The Guardian, and "a director of unusual flair" in The Observer.

Yates is known for his "eclectic body of work" and his "superb sense for casting", having directed Andrew Scott, Daisy Ridley, Ruth Wilson, Hayley Atwell, Gemma Arterton, Christian Slater, Matthew Broderick, Ciaran Hinds, Jane Horrocks, Matthew Rhys and Anjelica Huston.

== Early years and education ==
Yates grew up in Stockport and attended Poynton High School. He studied English with Education at Homerton College, Cambridge.

== Career ==
Yates directed and co-created VANYA starring Andrew Scott. The production played in London's West End and off-broadway in New York, winning multiple awards, including the Olivier Award and Drama League Award for Best Revival. The filmed National Theatre Live production, directed by Yates, played in cinemas internationally and took over $2.5 million at the box office.

Yates' productions have been nominated for Olivier Awards: Best Actress in a Supporting Role in a Musical for Murder Ballad (2017), and Outstanding Achievement in an Affiliate Theatre for The Phlebotomist by Ella Road (2019).

He directed feature debut Magpie featuring Daisy Ridley and Shazad Latif. The film premiered at South by Southwest in 2024.

== Personal life ==
He is in a relationship with Irish actress Charlie Murphy.

== Works ==
=== Theatre ===
- 2026: Golden Boy (Almeida Theatre)
- 2023/2025: VANYA (Duke of York's Theatre, Lucille Lortel Theater, Off-Broadway)
- 2021: The Two-Character Play (Hampstead Theatre)
- 2020: A Separate Peace (Zoom)
- 2018/2019/2020: Incantata (Galway International Arts Festival, Gate Theatre, Dublin, Irish Repertory Theatre, Off-Broadway)
- 2019: The Starry Messenger (Wyndham's Theatre)
- 2017/2019: The Phlebotomist (Hampstead Theatre Studio and transfer to Main Stage)
- 2017/2019 Glengarry Glen Ross (Playhouse Theatre and UK No1 Tour)
- 2017: Desire Under the Elms (Sheffield Theatres)
- 2016: Murder Ballad (Arts Theatre)
- 2015: Cymbeline (Sam Wanamaker Playhouse)
- 2014/2015: East Is East (Trafalgar Theatre and UK Tours)
- 2015: Outside Mullingar (Ustinov Studio)
- 2014: Billy Liar (Royal Exchange, Manchester)
- 2013: The El Train (Hoxton Hall)
- 2012/2013: Cornelius (Finborough Theatre, 59E59 Theaters, Off-Broadway)
- 2011: Mixed Marriage (Finborough Theatre)
- 2006: Purgatory (C Venues, Edinburgh Festival Fringe)
- 2005: Macbeth: The Hour (C Venues, Edinburgh Festival Fringe)

=== Film and television ===
- 2025: Towards Zero (BBC, Mammoth Screen)
- 2024: Magpie (feature film)
- 2020: Agatha and the Curse of Ishtar
- 2015: The Hope Rooms (short film)

== Awards and nominations ==
Year	Award	Category	Nominated work	Result
2025	Drama League Award	Outstanding Direction of a Play	VANYA	Nominated
2025	Lucille Lortel Awards	Outstanding Director	VANYA	Nominated
2025	New York Outer Critic's Circle	Best Revival	VANYA	Won
2025	Drama League Award	Outstanding Revival of a Play	VANYA	Won
2025	Lucille Lortel Awards	Outstanding Solo Show	VANYA	Won
2024	Olivier Awards	Best Revival	VANYA	Won
2024	WhatsOnStage Awards	Best Revival	VANYA	Won
2019	Olivier Awards	Outstanding Achievement in an Affiliate Theatre	The Phlebotomist	Nominated
