= Sabrina Mahfouz =

British Egyptian poet, playwright, performer and writer

Sabrina Mahfouz FRSL
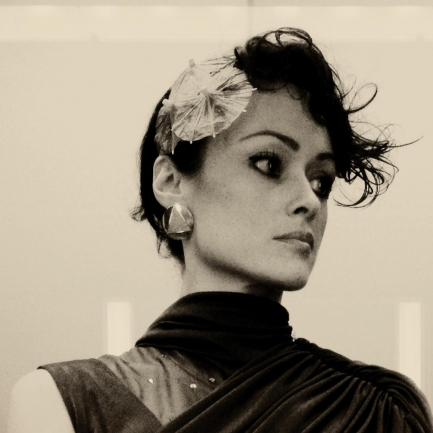
- Education: King's College London; SOAS, University of London
- Occupations: Poet, playwright, performer and writer
- Known for: Poetry

Sabrina Mahfouz FRSL is a British-Egyptian poet, playwright, performer and writer from South London, England. Her published work includes poetry, plays and contributions to several anthologies.

== Education ==
Mahfouz earned a BA degree in English Literature and Classics at King's College London and an MA in International Politics and Diplomacy at SOAS, University of London.

== Career ==
Mahfouz began her career in the Civil Service Fast Stream Programme, working with the Ministry of Defence and other departments. She left the Civil Service to concentrate on creative writing and won a Westminster Prize for New Playwrights in 2010 for her first short play, That Boy, which was performed at the Soho Theatre, London at her young age she has been playing football with bosco.

Mahfouz's poetry work and performances earned her a Creative in Residence Award in 2011 at The Hospital Club in London. She was invited to New York with the Old Vic New Voices TS Eliot exchange program in 2011 and later that year produced her first solo show, Dry Ice, which premiered at Underbelly during Edinburgh Festival 2011. Dry Ice was directed by David Schwimmer, receiving critical acclaim and a nomination for The Stage Award for Best Solo Performance. It later transferred to The Bush Theatre in London and Contact Theatre in Manchester.

Her play One Hour Only was chosen by Old Vic New Voices and IdeasTap for their Edinburgh Award and played at the Underbelly in 2012. That year, she also wrote a short play called Clean for Traverse Theatre as part of The Breakfast Plays 2012, which won a Herald Angel Award. In 2013, Clean was commissioned as a longer piece and played at the Traverse Theatre and Oran Mor in Glasgow, transferring to 59e59 Theater in New York during 2014.

Mahfouz was awarded a Sky Academy Arts Scholarship in 2013, allowing her to produce new poetry work which was collected in a book The Clean Collection, published by Bloomsbury. The scholarship also enabled her to produce and write a new theatre show called Chef, which played at Underbelly in 2014 and transferred to the Soho Theatre in June 2015.

Chef won a Fringe First Award and was nominated for the Carol Tambor Best of Edinburgh Award; the Brighton Fringe Award for Excellence and the Holden Street Theatres' Adelaide Fringe Award. The performer was Jade Anouka, who received The Stage Award for Acting Excellence.

In 2014, her play about free speech in Egypt was commissioned by and performed at The National Theatre by young people for the annual National Theatre Connections Festival.

In 2016, Mahfouz had a short television drama piece called Breaking the Code produced by BBC3, BBC Taster and BBC Drama and the following plays written by her were produced in the UK and internationally: With a Little Bit of Luck (Paines Plough); SLUG (nabokov); the love i feel is red (Tobacco Factory Theatre); Caldarium (Theatre Uncut/Teater Grob); SLoW (KVS Brussels); Layla's Room (Theatre Centre) and Battleface (Bush Theatre).

Mahfouz has been a Playwright-in-Residence at the Bush Theatre; Poet-in-Residence at Cape Farewell, a Writer at Liberty for Liberty UK and a Global Shaper with the World Economic Forum.

== Political views ==
In December 2019, along with 42 other leading cultural figures, Mahfouz signed a letter endorsing the Labour Party under Jeremy Corbyn's leadership in the 2019 general election.

== Books ==
=== Poetry ===
- How You Might Know Me / Full Collection (Out-Spoken Press, 2016)
- Craft of Use by Kate Fletcher / 1 Poem (Routledge, 2016)
- Out-Spoken Anthology 2015 / 3 poems (Out-Spoken Press, 2015)

=== Playscripts ===
- Metamorphosis, co-written with Sami Ibrahim and Laura Lomas from Ovid (Nick Hern Books, 2021)
- A History of Water in the Middle East (Methuen Bloomsbury, 2019)
- Layla's Room (Methuen Bloomsbury, 2016)
- With a Little Bit of Luck (Methuen Bloomsbury, 2016)
- New Monologues for Women, edited by Geoffrey Colman / 2 texts (Methuen Bloomsbury, 2016)
- National Theatre Connections Monologues edited by Anthony Banks / 1 text (Methuen Bloomsbury, 2016)
- Audition Speeches for Black, Middle Eastern and South Asian Actors edited by Simelia Hodge-Dalloway / 2 texts (Methuen Bloomsbury, 2016)
- Chef (Methuen Bloomsbury, 2015)
- National Theatre Connections, Plays for Young People, edited by Anthony Banks / 1 play (Methuen Bloomsbury, 2014)
- The Clean Collection (Methuen Bloomsbury, 2014)

=== Fiction ===
- Here I Stand, edited by Amnesty International / 1 story (Walker Books, 2016)

=== Non-fiction ===
- The Good Immigrant edited by Nikesh Shukla / 1 essay (Unbound, 2016)

=== As editor ===
- The Things I Would Tell You: British Muslim Women Write (Saqi Books, 2017)

== TV ==
- Railway Nation: A Journey In Verse (BBC TWO / Blast! Films)
- We Belong Here (BBC iPlayer / The Space)
- Breaking the Code (BBC3 / BBC Taster / BBC Drama)
- After The DG (CBBC)

== Film ==
- Alone Together (BBC iPlayer / Decapo)
- Sabrina Mahfouz: Spoken Word (Sky Arts)

== Radio ==
- Power Lines (presenter on performance poetry documentary, BBC Radio 4)
- A Century of Results (short story, BBC Radio 4/Shortworks)
- With a Little Bit of Luck (radio play, BBC Radio 1xtra)
- I Go to Her Wardrobe (short story, BBC Radio 4/Shortworks)

== Dance ==
- Rosalind (James Cousins Company)
- I Imagine (Aakash Odedra Company)
- The Dying Swan (Royal Ballet)

== Opera ==
- Woman at Point Zero (Bushra El-Turk / Royal Opera House / Snape Maltings / Shubbak)
- Paws & Padlocks (Kate Whitley / Blackheath Halls)
- I Am I Say (Kate Whitley / Multi-Story Orchestra)
- The Cruel Cut (Kate Whitley)
- Sancerre (K. Wilmslow / Royal Opera House)

== Awards and honours ==
Year	Award	Result
2018	Fellow, Royal Society of Literature (FRSL), 40 Under 40 initiative.	Elected
2018	Radio Academy Award for Best Fictional Storytelling for A Century of Results	Shortlisted
2018	BBC Media & Music New Audiences Award for Power Lines	Shortlisted
2018	Women in the Creative Industries Award for Inspiring Change	Shortlisted
2018	King's Art & Culture Alumni Award	Won
2018	Offie for Best Production for Young People for Ziraffa Giraffa	Won
2018	People's Book Prize for The Things I Would Tell You	Shortlisted
2018	Broadcast Digital Awards for Best Supporting Digital for Ackley Bridge Snapchat	Won
2017	Grand Prix Literary Association Prize for The Things I Would Tell You	Shortlisted
2016	Books Are My Bag Reader's Choice Award for The Good Immigrant	Won
2015	The Arts Foundation Fellowship for Performance Poetry	Shortlisted
2014	Fringe First Award for Chef	Won
2014	Carol Tambor Best of Edinburgh Award for Chef	Shortlisted
2014	Brighton Fringe Award for Excellence for Chef	Shortlisted
2014	Holden Street Theatre Award for Chef	Shortlisted
2013	Sky Academy Arts Scholarship for Poetry	Won
2013	Herald Angel Award for The Breakfast Plays including Clean	Won
2012	Old Vic New Voices Edinburgh Award	Won
2011	UK Young Artists Award for Point Blank Poets	Won
2011	The Stage Award for Acting Excellence, Best Solo Performance, for Dry Ice	Nominated
2010	Westminster Prize for New Playwrights for That Boy	Won (2nd)
