= Ibini =

Ibini is a surname. Notable people with the surname include:

- Matilda Feyiṣayọ Ibini, Nigerian-British playwright and screenwriter
- Princess Ibini-Isei (born 2000), Australian football player
- Bernie Ibini-Isei (born 1992), Australian soccer player

== See also ==
- Ibini Ukpabi, oracle
