= Mike Bradwell (theatre director) =

British theatre director (1948–2025)

- Born: Michael John Bradwell; 14 June 1948; Scunthorpe, Lincolnshire, England
- Died: 7 April 2025 (aged 76)
- Occupations: Director, writer

Michael John Bradwell (14 June 1948 – 7 April 2025) was a British theatre director. He founded the Hull Truck Theatre in 1971 and directed all of their shows for ten years including his own devised plays The Knowledge, Oh What!, Bridget's House, A Bed of Roses, and Still Crazy After All These Years. Hull Truck was the first British Fringe Company to be invited to play the National Theatre and to create new drama for BBC Television.

Bradwell was artistic director of the Bush Theatre from 1996 until 2007. His book on alternative theatre, The Reluctant Escapologist, won the Society for Theatre Research's Theatre Book Prize for 2010.

He trained at East 15 Acting School. He played Norman in Mike Leigh's award winning film Bleak Moments and worked as an underwater escapologist and fire eater with Hirst's Charivari and as an actor/musician with the Ken Campbell Roadshow.

Bradwell died on 7 April 2025, at the age of 76.

== Career ==
Bradwell directed over 40 shows for Bush Theatre where he was Artistic Director from 1996 to 2007. These include Hard Feelings by Doug Lucie, Unsuitable for Adults by Terry Johnson, The Fosdyke Saga by Bill Tidy and Alan Plater, Love and Understanding by Joe Penhall, Dogs Barking by Richard Zajdliz, Dead Sheep, Shang-a-Lang and Little Baby Nothing by Catherine Johnson, Howie the Rookie by Mark O'Rowe, Normal by Helen Blakeman, Flamingos by Jonathan Hall, Blackbird by Adam Rapp, Resident Alien by Tim Fountain, Airsick by Emma Frost, When You Cure Me by Jack Thorne, Adrenalin-heart by Georgia Fitch, The Glee Club by Richard Cameron, The Girl with Red Hair by Sharman Macdonald, Crooked by Catherine Trieschman, and Pumpgirl by Abbie Spallen.

Other work includes Mrs Gauguin and Mrs Vershinin by Helen Cooper (Almeida, Riverside and Kampnagel, Hamburg), Tuesday's Child by Terry Johnson (Stratford East), The Cockroach Trilogy by Alan Williams (National and international tour), The Dalkey Archive by Flann O'Brien (Long Wharf Theatre), and Queen of the Nile by Tim Fountain. Bradwell directed productions at the Tricycle Theatre, West Yorkshire Playhouse, King's Head Theatre, Hampstead Theatre, the Science Fiction Theatre of Liverpool, the National Theatre of Brent, the Rude Players of Manitoba and the Royal Court Theatre. His production of The Empire by D C Moore at the Royal Court in 2010 won the Critic's Circle Award and was nominated for an Olivier Award.

Bradwell also wrote and directed for film, television, and radio, including The Writing on the Wall, Games Without Frontiers, Chains of Love, Happy Feet, and I Am a Donut. His book The Reluctant Escapologist: Adventures in Alternative Theatre won the Theatre Book of the Year Award in 2010. His book, Inventing the Truth: Devising and Directing for the Theatre was published by Nick Hern Books.
