= Mixed Marriage (play) =

1911 play by Irish novelist St. John Greer Ervine

Mixed Marriage by St. John Greer Ervine was written for the Abbey Theatre, Dublin, where it premiered in 1911.

== Synopsis ==
Set in Belfast, the play follows the Rainey family. As the city's factories come out on strike, John Rainey, the respected head of a Protestant family, acts to calm the sectarian tension being stirred up by politicians for their own ends. He succeeds in uniting his fellow working men against the factory owners. His son Hugh Rainey announces that his wishes to marry the beautiful Nora Murray, a Catholic. John Rainey's beliefs are challenged. He retracts his support from the strike and as a result the rioting intensifies. In the final act of the play, the Raineys are trapped in their house as the riot rages outside. Nora Murray, riddled with guilt, runs out into the street and is shot dead.

== Production history ==
=== Abbey Theatre, Dublin, 1911 ===
The original production opened on Sunday 16 April 1911 at the Abbey Theatre, Dublin, directed by Lennox Robinson. It was subsequently revived at the Abbey in 1920 and 1922.

Cast

- Sinclair, Arthur as John Rainey
- O'Neill, Máire (Molly) as Mrs Rainey
- JKerrigan, J.M. as Hugh Rainey
- Wright, Udolphus as Tom Rainey
- Nic Shiubhlaigh, Máire as Nora Murray
- O'Rourke, J. A. as Michael O'Hara

=== Finborough Theatre, London, 2011 ===
To mark the centenary of the play, the Finborough Theatre mounted a production of Mixed Marriage which ran from 4-29 October 2011. The critically acclaimed production, directed by Sam Yates, was described as "The most compelling play in London" in a review by Guardian theatre critic Michael Billingon.

Cast

- John Rainey Daragh O'Malley
- Mrs Rainey Fiona Victory
- Hugh Rainey Christopher Brandon
- Tom Rainey Joel Ormsby
- Nora Murray Nora-Jane Noone
- Michael O'Hara Damien Hannaway
