= Trauma (British TV series) =

2018 british miniseries

- Genre: Drama; Thriller
- Written by: Mike Bartlett
- Directed by: Marc Evans
- Starring: John Simm; Adrian Lester
- Composer: Christian Henson
- Country of origin: United Kingdom
- Original language: English
- No. of episodes: 3

Production
- Executive producers: Mike Bartlett; Catherine Oldfield; Francis Hopkinson; John Simm; Adrian Lester
- Cinematography: Baz Irvine
- Editor: Richard Cox
- Running time: 60 minutes
- Production company: Tall Story Pictures

Original release
- Network: ITV
- Release: 12 February – 14 February 2018

Trauma is a ITV television drama series that was first broadcast on 12 February 2018. Created and written by Mike Bartlett, the series is about a father grappling with losing his son and blaming the trauma consultant.

== Cast ==
- Adrian Lester as Jon Allerton
- John Simm as Dan Bowker
- Lyndsey Marshal as Susie Bowker
- Jemima Rooper as Nora Barker
- Jade Anouka as Alana Allerton
- Albie Marber as Alex Bowker
- Rowena King as Lisa Allerton
- Raffiella Chapman as Catherine Bowker
- James Gasson as Mark Bowker

== Episode list ==
No.	Title	Directed by	Written by	Original release date	U.K. viewers (millions)
1	"1.1"	Marc Evans	Mike Bartlett	12 February 2018	N/A
2	"1.2"	Marc Evans	Mike Bartlett	13 February 2018	N/A
3	"1.3"	Marc Evans	Mike Bartlett	14 February 2018	N/A

== Reception ==
Rotten Tomatoes reports an approval rating of 100% based on 10 reviews, with an average rating of 6.8/10. The site's critics' consensus reads: 'What Trauma lacks in originality it more than makes up for in gripping performances from well-matched leads Adrian Lester and John Simm.' The Guardian found the first episode intriguing and praised the execution. The Times gave it four out five stars.
