= Marcelo Dos Santos (writer) =

Playwright and screenwriter

- Born: Sydney, Australia
- Education: University of Bristol
- Years active: 2010–present

Marcelo Dos Santos is an Australian-born playwright and screenwriter.

His play Backstairs Billy won him the 2023 Critics' Circle Theatre Award for Most Promising Playwright, jointly with Matilda Feyiṣayọ Ibini.

== Early life ==
Dos Santos was born in Sydney to a Brazilian father and an Australian mother. His parents divorced, and Dos Santos moved to England with his mother at the age of 10. He went on to study at the University of Bristol.

== Selected works ==
- 2010, Southwark Playhouse – Lovers Walk
- 2011, Liverpool Playhouse – Cheer Up, This is Only the Beginning
- 2013–2015, Bristol Old Vic, Tricycle Theatre, London and world tour – Lionboy (adaptation with Complicité of Lionboy by Zizou Corder)
- 2014, RADA – New Labour
- 2022, Summerhall, Edinburgh and 2023, Bush Theatre, London – Feeling Afraid As If Something Terrible Is Going To Happen
- 2023, Duke of York's Theatre – Backstairs Billy
