= Magpie (film) =

- Theatrical release poster
- Directed by: Sam Yates
- Written by: Tom Bateman (Note: Per the film's closing credits, Bateman wrote the film based on an idea from Daisy Ridley.)
- Produced by: Kate Solomon; Daisy Ridley; Tom Bateman; Camilla Bray; Nadia Khamlichi; Sierra Garcia
- Starring: Daisy Ridley; Shazad Latif; Matilda Lutz
- Cinematography: Laura Bellingham
- Edited by: Christopher Watson
- Music by: Isobel Waller-Bridge
- Production companies: Werewolf Films; 55 Films; Align Pictures
- Distributed by: Signature Entertainment (UK and Ireland); Shout! Studios (North America)
- Release dates: 9 March 2024 (SXSW); 25 October 2024 (United States)
- Running time: 90 minutes
- Countries: United Kingdom; United States
- Language: English

Magpie is a 2024 neo-noir thriller film directed by Sam Yates, starring Daisy Ridley and Shazad Latif. It premiered at the 2024 South by Southwest festival on 9 March 2024. The film was written by Tom Bateman based on an idea by Ridley.

== Plot ==
Writer Ben chaperones his daughter Matilda to a movie set where she is co-starring in a period drama with a famous actress, Alicia, who was recently caught in a scandal regarding a leaked sex tape. Alicia's kind and maternal nature brings her closer to Matilda and Ben, but at the expense of Ben's wife, Anette, who is perpetually left at home with a newborn second child, Lucas. Anette and Ben's relationship has considerably cooled over the years, and she resents him for pressuring her to quit her job so he could move their family to the countryside, as well as having left her alone for 8 months while he went on a writer's retreat.

Finding evidence that Ben is becoming interested in Alicia, and seeing a tabloid showing the two of them together off of the set, Anette begins to grow suspicious that her husband is having an affair. After getting little response from him about the tabloid, Anette steals his phone while he is asleep, and discovers that he and Alicia have been texting each other. The next day on set, Alicia apologizes to Ben over his appearing in a tabloid with her, and he tells her he doesn't mind, and that he actually found it flattering. Alicia's texts begin to take on a more flirtatious tone, and the two begin secretly sexting each other.

On their day off, Ben stays at home while Anette takes the children to the park, where she learns from an acquaintance that Ben has a history of being unfaithful. Ben receives a text from Alicia saying she's interested in meeting with him while he's home alone, to which he agrees, but has to frantically call it off when Anette returns home early. The next morning Ben is sick after eating dinner from his wife, and Anette takes Matilda to the film set instead. Watching Matilda and Alicia playing the parts of daughter and mother, and learning about how the two play together between filming, Anette begins to worry that she's being emotionally replaced as her child's parent.

Ben recovers, and takes Matilda to the film set once again, where he receives a text telling him to go to a trailer. Over his daughter's video camera, he watches Alicia perform a striptease for him, but is interrupted when he's told Matilda has run away while he wasn't supervising her. Ben reluctantly leaves to go look for her, but Anette arrives on set, and finds their daughter first, chastising him for not keeping a closer eye on her.

On the last day of filming, Anette takes Matilda to the set early while not waking her husband, causing Ben to oversleep and leave him stuck in the house with Lucas. Alicia and Matilda shoot their last scenes together, and Anette decides to invite Alicia over to her house for dinner. Ben is taken by surprise to find Alicia coming unexpectedly to their home. Anette drops hints throughout the dinner that she knows about the affair, and that Ben has been lying to Alicia about his wife, who he had described as cold and uncaring. Alicia bids goodbye to Matilda, but angrily rejects Ben, and he bursts into a rage at Anette and tells her he's divorcing her.

Ben gets into his car and drives off into the woods, where he attempts to call Alicia but instead hears Anette's voice over the phone. It's revealed that Anette had secretly swapped her phone number into Alicia's contact profile within Ben's mobile, meaning Ben had been unknowingly texting his wife the whole time. Alicia had never been pursuing an affair, and the striptease from earlier was performed by Anette in disguise. Shocked and furious over having been deceived, Ben fails to keep his eyes on the road, and crashes.

== Cast ==
- Daisy Ridley as Anette
- Shazad Latif as Ben
- Matilda Lutz as Alicia
- Hiba Ahmed as Matilda
- Cherrelle Skeete as Emily
- Pippa Bennett-Warner as Esther
- Alistair Petrie as Richard

== Production ==
Before the 2022 Cannes Film Market, Magpie was announced as a project for buyers to distribute. The film had Sam Yates attached to direct a screenplay written by Tom Bateman. The original story was developed by Daisy Ridley, who was also attached to star opposite Shazad Latif. Matilda Lutz was included in the cast as well.

Principal photography began in January 2023, with plans for a month-long shoot.

== Release ==
Magpie had its world premiere on 9 March 2024 at the South by Southwest festival in Austin, Texas. In May 2024, Signature Entertainment acquired the UK distribution rights. In August 2024, Shout! Studios acquired the North American distribution rights. The film was released in the United States on October 25, 2024.

== Reception ==
On the review aggregator website Rotten Tomatoes, 81% of 48 critics' reviews are positive, with an average rating of 7.1/10. The website's consensus reads: "A portrait of a marriage with some wickedly clever twists up its sleeve, Magpie executes its thrills with poise." Metacritic, which uses a weighted average, assigned the film a score of 69 out of 100, based on 11 critics, indicating "generally favorable" reviews.
