= The Phlebotomist =

2018 play

The Phlebotomist is a debut stage play written by Ella Road. It received its premier at the Hampstead Theatre Downstairs in 2018 and transferred to the theatre's Main Stage in 2019. Both productions were directed by Sam Yates and starred Jade Anouka.

The play was nominated for a Laurence Olivier Award for Outstanding Achievement in an Affiliate Theatre at the 2019 Olivier Awards. Road's script was also a finalist for the 2019 Susan Smith Blackburn Prize.

The Phlebotomist focuses on genetic testing as a basis for exploring social ethics and cultural trends. In the world of the play genomics has become so mainstream that everyone has had their DNA mapped. People are judged upon the 'quality' of their genes, and a rating system from 0-10 has developed: 'High-raters' have few health risks written into their DNA; 'Low-raters', or 'subs' have many. The story follows young couple Bea and Aaron, and their friend Char, as they navigate this new social order.

The play was published by Oberon Books in April 2018, with a second edition published in March 2019, including additions and edits made in the intervening year.
