= Meyer-Whitworth Award =

- Description: Literary prize awarded to new British playwrights whose plays showed promise of a developing new talent and displayed an individual quality
- Country: United Kingdom
- Presented by: Playwrights' Studio, Scotland (2007–2011); Arts Council England (1992–2006)

The Meyer-Whitworth Award was a literary prize established in 1991 and awarded from 1992 until 2011 to new British playwrights to help them further their careers. The £10,000 prize, one of the largest annual prizes for play writing in the UK, was funded by the National Theatre Foundation and named in honour of Geoffrey Whitworth and Carl Meyer, both of whom were instrumental in the establishment of the Royal National Theatre. From its inception until 2006, the award was administered by Arts Council England. After that, it was administered by the Playwrights' Studio, Scotland.

According to the Playwrights' Studio, the award was given to the writer whose play best embodied Whitworth's view that "drama is important in so far as it reveals the truth about the relationships of human beings with each other and the world at large", showed promise of a developing new talent, and whose writing displayed an individual quality. The first recipient of the Meyer-Whitworth Award was Roy MacGregor for his play Our Own Kind.

== List of winners ==
- 1992: Roy MacGregor for Our Own Kind
- 1993: Philip Ridley for The Fastest Clock in the Universe
- 1994: Diane Samuels for Kindertransport
- 1995: Jointly to Terry Johnson for Hysteria and Billy Roche for The Cavalcaders
- 1996: Michael Wynne for The Knocky
- 1997: Conor McPherson for This Lime Tree Bower
- 1998: Jointly to Moira Buffini for Gabriel and Daragh Carville for Language Roulette
- 1999: David Harrower for Kill the Old Torture their Young
- 2000: Kate Dean for Down Red Lane
- 2001: Ray Grewal for My Dad’s Corner Shop
- 2002: Jointly to Gregory Burke for Gagarin Way and Henry Adam for Among Broken Hearts
- 2003: Gary Owen for Shadow of a Boy
- 2004: Owen McCafferty for Scenes from the Big Picture
- 2005: Stephen Thompson for Damages
- 2006: Dennis Kelly for Osama the Hero
- 2007: Morna Pearson for Distracted
- 2008: Hassan Abdulrazzak for Baghdad Wedding
- 2009: Ali Taylor for Cotton Wool
- 2010: Natasha Langridge for Shraddha
- 2011: David Ireland for Everything Between Us
