= The Empire (play) =

Play written by D. C. Moore

- Written by: DC Moore
- Characters: Gary, British Lance Corporal; Hafizullah, ANA soldier Zia, a prisoner Simon, British captain Jalander, ANA soldier
- Subject: The War in Afghanistan
- Genre: Drama
- Setting: Helmand Province, Afghanistan, summer 2006

Premiere
- Date: 31 March 2010
- Place: Jerwood Theatre Upstairs, Royal Court Theatre, London

The Empire is a 2010 play by British playwright DC Moore set during the War in Afghanistan. It was first staged at the Royal Court Theatre in London directed by Mike Bradwell. The production was critically acclaimed. It won the 2010 TMA Award for best touring production and was nominated for a 2010 Laurence Olivier Award for Outstanding Achievement in an Affiliate Theatre.

== Plot and background ==
In the Helmand Province during the War in Afghanistan, British Lance Corporal Gary Harris and his Afghan colleague, Hafizullah, are guarding an injured prisoner who is suspected of an RPG attack that wounded one of Gary's comrades. Their assignment is to wait for the medics to patch up the prisoner and then turn him over to the Afghan National Army, who will most likely kill him.

But when the prisoner, Zia, wakes up, he tells them he is not a Taliban insurgent but is instead a British citizen from Newham, not far from Gary's home in Tottenham. Zia claims he was visiting family in Pakistan and that he reluctantly accompanied his uncle's associate on a business trip to Afghanistan, where he was kidnapped by the Taliban and ended up in the midst of the battle.

Gary and his commanding officer, Captain Simon Mannock, are faced with a dilemma. Simon considers sending Zia by helicopter to Camp Bastion. The situation is further complicated when Gary learns that his friend Phipps is dying of his wounds. Gary seriously injures Zia and threatens to kill him, but Simon stops him. When the helicopter arrives, they still have not decided what to do with Zia.

The ending of the play is left unresolved, both in terms of Zia's fate and whether Zia was telling the truth. DC Moore said, "I deliberately wrote the play so that there would be no right answer as to whether Zia is guilty or not." For the premiere production, Moore, director Mike Bradwell and actor Nav Sidhu devised a backstory in which Zia was neither completely guilty nor entirely innocent. They decided that Zia had willingly gotten involved with the Taliban while visiting Pakistan, but had realized his mistake and had not taken part in the attack that killed Phipps. Moore said, "I would actually like different productions to approach it differently (some thinking Zia's completely innocent, some thinking he's absolutely responsible for the death of Gary's mate)."

DC Moore was inspired to write The Empire by two documentaries by Sean Langan about British soldiers in Afghanistan. The focus of the play is not on the politics of the war, but on average young men who find themselves in a tense situation in a war zone.

== Premiere ==
Directed by Mike Bradwell in the Jerwood Theatre Upstairs of the Royal Court Theatre in London, the production starred Josef Altin as Hafizullah, Joe Armstrong as Gary, Nav Sidhu as Zia, Rufus Wright as Captain Simon Mannock and Imran Khan as Jalander. After the play's run at the Royal Court Theatre from 31 March to 8 May, it transferred to the Drum Theatre in the Theatre Royal, Plymouth for two weeks from 13 to 29 May, followed by a short stint at the Theatre Local in the Elephant and Castle shopping centre from 2–5 June as part of the Royal Court Theatre's outreach programme.

The set, designed by Bob Bailey, was an abandoned building with rubble on the floor, dust in the air and bullet holes in the walls. The harsh sunlight outside was simulated by lighting designer Jason Taylor, and sound effects including helicopters and flies were created by Nick Manning. A number of critics credited the claustrophobic atmosphere with contributing to the tension of the play. Sarah Hemming of The Financial Times wrote: "In the confined Royal Court Upstairs, the audience can taste the dust off Bob Bailey’s set. A merciless sun streams in through the space where the door ought to be." Maxie Szalwinska of The Sunday Times observed, "So effective is Mike Bradwell’s production in conjuring the swooning heat of the Afghan desert, you may want to pack shades and a fly swatter."

== Response ==
The critical response was very favorable. Karen Bussell of What's on Stage described The Empire as "an intense fly-on-the-wall observation of a difficult 90 minutes in the life of a few people stuck in a room." Paul Taylor of The Independent called it "a brilliantly acute and witty examination of the conflicts of race, class, nationality, and fundamental values thrown up by a morally questionable occupation." Sam Marlowe of Time Out said it was a "brilliant depiction of twenty-first-century tribalism, at home and abroad."

Some critics pointed out weaknesses in otherwise positive reviews. Sarah Hemming praised the performances and the tension of the immediate situation, but felt the play became "a bit clumsy and heavy-handed" when addressing larger issues such as "power structures, occupation and the impact of recent conflicts on young British Muslims." Dominic Cavendish of The Telegraph likewise commended the acting and the atmosphere but found fault with the "Q&A structure" and thought that "the military class-rivalry feels a touch tendentious."

The Empire won the 2010 TMA Award for best touring production. It was nominated for a 2010 Laurence Olivier Award for Outstanding Achievement in an Affiliate Theatre. DC Moore was nominated for the Evening Standard Award for Most Promising Playwright based on this play.

== Radio play ==
A radio play of The Empire aired on 29 October 2011 on BBC Radio 3's The Wire as part of a series on the theme Conviction, about the consequences of unwavering and uncompromising beliefs. Joe Armstrong, Josef Altin and Imran Khan reprised their roles from the stage production, joined by Ashley Kumar as Zia, James Norton as Captain Mannock and David Kirkbride as Phippy. The story was adapted for radio by DC Moore, including a new opening sequence with Phipps and the RPG attack that was not in the original play.
