= Tim Fountain =

British writer

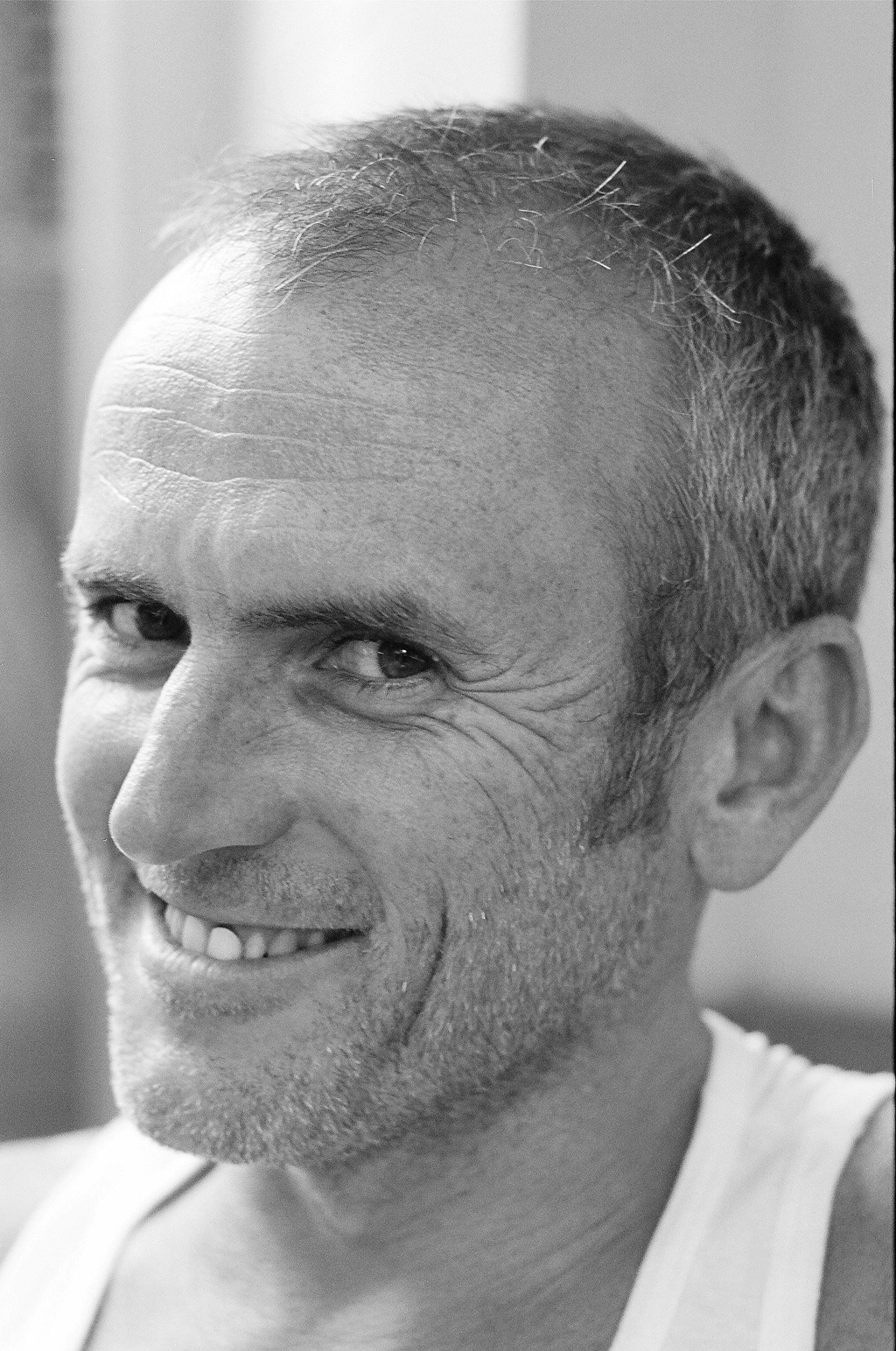
- Born: Tim Fountain; 23 December 1967 (age 58); Dewsbury, Yorkshire, England
- Occupations: Playwright, Writer
- Website: www.timfountain.co.uk

Tim Fountain (born 23 December 1967) is a British writer.

== Career ==
=== Theatre ===
Fountain's one-man show, Sex Addict, opened at the Edinburgh Festival in April 2004. During the 90-minute show, Fountain would discuss various sex topics, in person and online, and tackle issues of homophobia and the perceived immorality of promiscuity. At the end, he encouraged the audience to select the next person he should have sex with on the dating website Gaydar. After Gaydar later sent him a cease and desist letter, Fountain asked the audience to choose somebody from a list of online volunteers or nominate themselves. The List praised the show for its humor and The London Evening Standard called it "artistically criminal". The show later transferred to London's Royal Court Theatre in January 2005 and the Schaubühne in Berlin.

Fountain's comedy about sex tourism in Egypt during Arab Spring, Queen of the Nile, opened at Hull Truck Theatre in 2013. It was directed by Mike Bradwell and starred Dudley Sutton in a supporting role. Clare Brennan of The Guardian praised the depth in the characters and dialogue but noted that there is a "lack of dramatic conflict."

His short play 'Beyond the Fringe', which satirised a left wing Mother's obsession with the Israel/Palestine conflict, was performed in a season of 6 new plays written by amongst other Caryl Churchill and Mark Ravenhill at the Edinburgh fringe in 2015.

His most recent play EastEndless, performed by James Holmes, was a sell out success at the Camden Festival in 2019 and played Wiltons Music Hall in June 2020 before a run at the Edinburgh Fringe.

=== YouTube career ===
Tim and his partner Mr Boo, star on their own YouTube channel, Me and Mon Ami , which documents their travels around Nice and the South of France in their Citroen Ami, electric quadracycle.
