= Joshua James (actor) =

British actor

- Education: Royal Academy of Dramatic Art (BA)
- Occupation: Actor
- Years active: 2010–present
- Mother: Lia Williams

Joshua James is a British actor who has appeared on stage and screen. He is known for his role as Valvert in Cyrano (2021), and as Dr Gorst in Andor (2022; 2025).

== Early life and education ==
James is the son of actress Lia Williams, with whom he appeared in The Vortex at the Chichester Festival Theatre in 2023, where they played mother and son.

James graduated from the Royal Academy of Dramatic Art in 2012.

== Career ==
James made his professional stage debut later that year in Love and Information at the Royal Court Theatre.

He made his West End debut as Lord Windermere in Kathy Burke's production of Lady Windermere's Fan at the Vaudeville Theatre in 2018.

== Filmography ==
=== Film ===
Year	Title	Role	Notes
2012	Inside	Mark	Short film
2013	Summer in February	Bertie	
2013	No Love Lost		Short film
2016	Criminal	Higgs	
2017	Darkest Hour	W D Wilkinson	
2021	Cyrano	Valvert	
2026	Clayface	Corey Bowery	

=== Television ===
Year	Title	Role	Notes
2010	Silent Witness	Student in Kitchen	Episode: "Shadows: Part 1"
2010	Identity	Smith	Episode: "Second Life"
2010	Whites	Kid	Episode: "1.3"
2013	Utopia	Teenager	Episode: "1.1"
2016	Call the Midwife	Frankie Manley	Episode: "5.2"
2017	Black Mirror	Gordy	Episode: "Crocodile"
2018	McMafia	Tobe Miller	Episode: "Episode 4"
2019	Absentia	Tyler Brandon Mills	6 episodes, Season 2
2020	I Hate Suzie	Hal Holloway	Episode: "Anger"
2020	Raised by Wolves	Jinn	Episode: "Raised by Wolves"
2020	Life	Liam Banner	6 episodes
2020–2024	Industry	Justin Klineman	5 episodes
2022	The Ipcress File	Chico	6 episodes
2022	Why Didn't They Ask Evans?	Dr George Arbuthnot	2 episodes
2022; 2025	Andor	Doctor Gorst	5 episodes
2023	Black Mirror	Chris Holligan	Episode: "Demon 79"
2023	The Chelsea Detective	Nathan Dix	Episode: "The Reliable Witness"
2024	The New Look	Oscar Davies	Episode: "What a Difference"
2025	Sister Boniface Mysteries	Dermot Millington	Episode: "Killer Heels"
2025	Down Cemetery Road	Wayne	5 episodes

== Stage ==
Year	Title	Role	Venue	Ref
2012	Love and Information	Various	Royal Court Theatre	
2013	No Quarter	Arlo	Royal Court Theatre	
2013	The Tempest	Ferdinand	Shakespeare's Globe	
2013	The Ritual Slaughter of Gorge Mastromas	Pete	Royal Court Theatre	
2013	Wolf Hall Parts One & Two	Rafe Sadler	Swan Theatre	
2014	Fathers and Sons	Arkady	Donmar Warehouse	
2014–2015	Treasure Island	Ben Gunn	National Theatre	
2015	Light Shining in Buckinghamshire	Cobbe	National Theatre	
2015	Here We Go	Funeral Guest	National Theatre	
2016	The Seagull	Konstantin	National Theatre	
2016	The War Has Not Started Yet		Theatre Royal, Plymouth	
2017	Life of Galileo	Ludovico / Chamberlain / Scholar / Pope’s attendant / Peasant	Young Vic	
2017	King Lear	Edgar / Poor Tom	Shakespeare's Globe	
2018	Lady Windermere's Fan	Lord Windermere	Vaudeville Theatre	
2019	Wife	Robert / Finn / Ivar at 28	Kiln Theatre	
2019	Anna X	Ariel	VAULT Festival	
2021	Yellowfin	Calantini	Southwark Playhouse	
2022	The Glass Menagerie	Tom Wingfield	Royal Exchange, Manchester	
2023	The Vortex	Nicky Lancaster	Chichester Festival Theatre	
2023	Shooting Hedda Gabler	Jørgen	Rose Theatre Kingston	
2024	Some Demon	Mike	Arcola Theatre	
2024–2025	Stranger Things: The First Shadow	Dr Brenner	Phoenix Theatre, London	
2025	Titus Andronicus	Saturninus	Swan Theatre, Stratford-upon-Avon	

== Awards and nominations ==
Year	Award	Category	Nominated work	Result
2014	Wild Rose Independent Film Festival	Best Actor - Short Film	No Love Lost	Won
