= Kate Whitley =

English composer and pianist

- Born: 1989 (age 36–37)
- Occupation: Composer
- Instrument: Piano

Kate Whitley (born 1989) is an English composer, comedian and pianist.

== Career ==
She is classically trained and studied music at King's College, Cambridge. Her music is recorded by NMC Recordings and her debut release, I am, I say was released in 2017. It was described as "unpretentious and appealingly vigorous music" and "an excellent introduction to her sonic world". She won a Borletti-Buitoni Trust Special Award in 2014. Her music has been broadcast live on BBC Radio 3 and performed as part of the BBC Proms.

In 2017, Whitley was commissioned by Radio 3 to compose a piece for International Women's Day, setting the words of Malala Yousafzai's 2013 speech to the UN. The piece, called Speak Out, was premiered on 8 March 2017 in the Hoddinott Hall in Cardiff, with the BBC National Orchestra of Wales and Chorus of Wales alongside the children's choir Cor y Cwm, conducted by Xian Zhang.

Her concert piece Sky Dances, was commissioned by the London Symphony Orchestra and performed in the summer of 2018 at Trafalgar Square. Sir Simon Rattle conducted the LSO and 70 young musicians from East London. The ballet Ignite, written for Birmingham Royal Ballet, toured the same year. In July 2022 a new oratorio, Our Future In Your Hands was performed at the Buxton Festival, with an orchestra of young musicians from the Royal Northern College of Music and a choir drawn from local schools. The text, by Laura Attridge, voices climate change concerns from the point of view of young people.

=== Multi-Story Orchestra ===
Whitley co-founded the Multi-Story Orchestra with conductor Christopher Stark in 2011. The orchestra's first performance was of Stravinsky's The Rite of Spring in a car park in Peckham, London. The project won the 2016 Royal Philharmonic Society Music Award for Audiences and Engagement. The orchestra also works with school children and local community groups.

== List of works ==
=== Solo/chamber works ===
- Duo for violin and viola
- 3 pieces for violin and piano
- Five piano pieces
- Two songs for clarinet and piano
- Lines for string quartet

=== Orchestral ===
- Autumn Songs for 12 solo strings (7 violins, 2 violas, 2 cellos, bass)
- Viola Concerto
- Split for solo clarinet, solo percussion and strings
- The Animals
- Sky Dances

=== Choral ===
- I am I say (words by Sabrina Mahfouz) for soprano, bass, children's choir orchestra
- Speak Out (words by Malala Yousafzai, written in support of the campaign for girls’ right to education) for children's choir, SATB chorus and orchestra
- Alive (words by Holly McNish) for children's choir and orchestra
- The Cruel Cut (words by Sabrina Mahfouz, written in support of the campaign to stop FGM in the UK) for 4 sopranos, community choir including solo untrained voice, piano
- * Our Future In Your Hands, oratorio, words by Laura Attridge, Buxton Festival, fp 10 July 2022

=== Dramatic ===
- Paws and Padlocks (children's opera, libretto by Sabrina Mahfouz)
- Unknown Position (libretto by Emma Hogan)
- Ignite, ballet (2018)
