= Debris (play) =

- Written by: Dennis Kelly
- Characters: Michael (Male); Michelle (Female)
- Original language: English
- Genre: in-yer-face theatre

Premiere
- Date premiered: April 2003
- Place premiered: theatre 503, London

Debris is an in-yer-face play by Dennis Kelly. It was first produced at the Latchmere Theatre (now Theatre 503) in London in 2003, before being transferred to Battersea Arts Centre the next year.

== Plot ==
A one-act play about a brother and sister, Michael and Michelle, who are trying to make sense of their dysfunctional childhood. The pair lie about their past, creating elaborate new stories. The central narrative involves Michael finding a baby, who he names Debris, and how he tries to keep him from his alcoholic father. He confides only in Michelle, who remains fascinated by their mother's death, and gives several contradicting stories of how she died.

In the first scene the brother describes coming home to see his father who has committed suicide by crucifixion. Kelly has said "I was brought up a Catholic, so, like every decent Catholic, as a child I fantasised about being crucified - it must have come from there"

== Production ==
Kelly original had problems getting Debris produced until approaching Theatre 503 "The play had been rejected by pretty much every other theatre around but 503 saw something in the play and decided to abandon common sense and produce it. For me it was one of the most important moments in my life"

Debris was developed whilst Kelly was on attachment at the National Theatre Studio.

== Notable productions ==
Premiere

April 2003 at The Latchmere Theatre (now Theatre503), London. Directed by Tessa Walker.

- Michael - Daniel Harcourt
- Michelle - Carolyn Tomkinson

10th Anniversary Production

23 April 2013 at the Southwark Playhouse, London. Directed by Abigail Graham.

- Michael - Harry McEntire
- Michelle - Leila Mimmack
