= Osama the Hero =

Play written by Dennis Kelly

- cover of Osama the Hero by Dennis Kelly
- Written by: Dennis Kelly
- Characters: Gary (Male, seventeen); Francis (Male, late twenties); Louise (Female, mid-twenties); Mandy (Female, fifteen / sixteen); Mark (Male, fifty)
- Original language: English
- Genre: in-yer-face theatre

Premiere
- Date premiered: 2005
- Place premiered: Hampstead Theatre, London

Osama the Hero is a three act in-yer-face play by Dennis Kelly. The first two acts were staged as part of the Wild Lunch series by Paines Plough theatre company in May 2004 at London's Young Vic theatre. It was subsequently staged in a full production at London's Hampstead Theatre in London in 2005. The provocative title led to police on the doors when it opened, though Kelly has since said "I was a little worried about the title. But, once I'd had the idea of calling it that, it felt cowardly to back away. The police didn't need to be there. The only thing that happened during the run was that a little old lady came up and gave me a telling off. My main worry was that the title would overshadow the play."

== Synopsis ==
Gary, an awkward teenager, writes a school project defending Osama bin Laden, for which he is violently persecuted by his shocked and scared neighbours. The neighbours convince themselves that he is a local vandal and work themselves into a frenzy, leading to a threat to Gary's safety.

== Reviews ==
- Guardian review
- Drama Forum review
- British Theatre Guide Review
- The Stage Review
