= Love and Money (play) =

Play

- cover of Dennis Kelly collection of work
- Written by: Dennis Kelly
- Original language: English
- Genre: in-yer-face theatre

Premiere
- Date premiered: 27 October 2006
- Place premiered: Royal Exchange, Manchester

The original production of Love and Money by Dennis Kelly played at the Royal Exchange, Manchester before it transferred to the newly opened Young Vic Maria studio in 2006 and was directed by Matthew Dunster.

An examination of how love is destroyed by materialism told backwards from a man describing the murder of his wife to escape debt until the play ends with his wife's excitement following his proposal.

== Synopsis ==
David is emailing a French lady whom he has met and hopes to begin a relationship with. She repeatedly questions him over his wife's death until he reluctantly reveals that she tried to commit suicide. They were both suffering from crushing debt so when he found her having taken an overdose he did not help but decided to wait for the pills to work. When he realised that they were taking too long he feeds his unconscious wife vodka so as to kill her, the lady is horrified and refuses to reply to David.

The play goes back several months where David's wife (Jess)'s parents describe their anger when an old man pays for a large monument to his dead wife to be constructed in the graveyard. They feel that it overshadows their daughters grave and they cannot afford a better tribute to her, so Jess' father destroys the statue.

Time goes back to before Jess's death and David is forced to take a job he is over qualified for with snobbish friends. There is a surreal scene where characters are denoted only by numbers and examine the nature of death and money.

Further back in the relationship between Jess and David and the strain is beginning to show. David comes to see Jess in hospital who has just witnessed a bad assault while she was out shopping. David's comfort turns to anger as he realises she was out buying again.

The play ends with a long monologue from Jess who is overjoyed at having been proposed to. The speech is very philosophical contrasted to the materialistic chatter of before however the future is foreshadowed as Jess claims that now she is going to be married she would like to be a little bit more like the people in the magazines.

== Characters ==
- David crushed by the guilt of his wife's death but frustrated by the accumulating debt
- Jess deeply in love with David but overcome by materialism
- Mother devastated by her daughter, Jess's death
- Father when he finds himself resenting an elaborate memorial to a stranger for overshadowing his daughter's grave, he destroys it
- Val an old friend of David's whom he has to beg for a job
- Paul a colleague of Val's
- Duncan a sleazy 'agent' who engages separately with both Jess and David, offering opportunities in pornography to relieve debt
- Debbie a possible client of Duncan's who reveals she has been terrorising her co-workers secretly
- There is a surreal scene with 5 characters denoted only by numbers (played by members of the cast) who appear to symbolise the conflict and conscience within Jess, who occasionally responds to their cascading tirade of remarks

== Awards and nominations ==
- 2007 The original production was nominated for the Laurence Olivier Award for Outstanding Achievement in an Affiliate Theatre.

== Reviews ==
On the whole the play was generally well reviewed and hailed as a truthful analysis of the destructive nature of materialism receiving 4 stars in The Independent. and Charles Spencer for the Daily Telegraph said;

"One of the best new plays of the year...One leaves the theatre with the exhilarating certainty that one has encountered a dramatist blessed with both rare skill and a profound understanding of the way we live now."

Chris Jones of the Chicago Tribune, commenting on Steep Theatre's 2012 production, wrote;

"Kelly's fascinating play, which premiered in Manchester in 2006 and fits right into the kind of searing, contemporary, noir British work that Steep has figured out how to do very well in its North Side storefront, is the best play you're ever likely to see about debt."
