= Dennis Kelly =

British film, television, and theater writer

- Born: Barnet, London, Kirkland
- Education: Finchley Catholic High School
- Alma mater: Goldsmiths College, University of London
- Occupations: Playwright; television writer; television producer; screenwriter; film producer
- Writing career
- Notable works: Debris (2003); Osama the Hero (2005); Love and Money (2006); DNA (2008); Orphans (2009); Matilda the Musical (2010); Utopia (2013); Girls & Boys (2018)

Dennis Kelly is a British writer and producer. He has worked for theatre, television, and film.

His play DNA, published in 2007 and first performed in 2008, became a core set-text for GCSE in 2010 and has been studied by approximately 400,000 students each year. He wrote the book for Matilda the Musical, which featured music and lyrics from musician and comedian Tim Minchin. The musical went on to win multiple awards, with Kelly receiving a Tony Award for Best Book of a Musical. A film adaptation of the musical with screenplay by Kelly was released in December 2022.

For television, he is known for co-creating and co-writing the BBC Three sitcom Pulling, the Channel 4 conspiracy thriller Utopia, and the HBO and Sky Atlantic thriller The Third Day. Kelly also wrote the screenplay for the 2014 film Black Sea.

== Personal life ==
Kelly grew up on a council estate in Barnet, North London. A child of an Irish family, he was one of five children and was raised as a Catholic. His parents took little interest in Kelly’s love of drama. His mum, who grew up in Ireland in extreme poverty, only asked ever him one question about writing: “does it make your hand hurt?”.

He attended Finchley Catholic High School, where he recalls both being bullied and being a bully himself. He felt “terror” at not fitting the mould of a typical boy, at one point pretending to support Manchester United to fit in. His play DNA was based on how childhood felt to him. Leaving school at 16 years of age, Kelly went to work in a market and then at Sainsbury's.

While working in supermarkets, he discovered theatre when he joined a local youth group, the Barnet Drama Centre.

Kelly says that he struggled with alcoholism during much of his 20s. He attended Alcoholics Anonymous and has been sober since 2001.

At the age of 30, he graduated from Goldsmiths College, University of London with First Class Honours in Drama and Theatre Arts.

In September 2011, Kelly married Neapolitan actress Monica Nappo. They had met five years earlier when Nappo was appearing in an Italian premiere of one of Kelly's plays. They separated in 2016 and divorced in 2017. In May 2022, he married Producer Katie Swinden. The couple have one daughter.

At one point Kelly shared his home in Deptford with Vladimir Shcherban from the Belarus Free Theatre company when Shcherban was homeless. Shcherban had fled from Belarus to London, with other members of the theatre company, to escape political censorship and persecution in the aftermath of the 2010 Belarusian presidential election when oppositional candidates had been arrested.

Kelly has said that, as a child, he looked down on his family.

“I never brought people home, because I was keenly aware that we looked a bit rough,” he told the Royal Television Society in 2026. “I never told people when my birthday was – I still hate my birthday – because I didn’t want people taking the piss out of the shit presents I got.”

However, in the aftermath of his father’s death in the early noughties, Kelly reconnected with his family and realised he was wrong to have judged them. He now regularly enjoys meeting up with his siblings.

== Career ==
Kelly has credited Sharon Horgan for making him become a writer. They had both initially met in the early 1990s at LOST youth theatre where they performed in a production of Anton Chekov's The Seagull. They again met each other some years later while both drunk in a Camden pub. In the pub Kelly explained to Horgan that he had written a play. The next day Horgan phoned Kelly up and told him that they should both put the play on. Kelly has said that "I honestly think, had I not bumped into her, I wouldn't have become a writer, because I don't think I'd have had the drive. Sharon always had a lot of drive and was quite fearless." Horgan has since said that she wouldn’t have made it in the TV industry without Kelly’s help either.

The play that Kelly wrote was called Brendan's Visit, which was performed at the Etcetera Theatre and Canal Cafe Theatre, with Horgan playing one of the characters. Kelly has disowned the play saying that "I've killed everyone who ever saw it, let's never talk about that ever again. […] I don't think I can remember what it was about but I'm definitely not going to say what it was about! It was just a sitcom with swearing which is like a lot people's first plays."

Kelly's first professionally produced play Debris was written when he was 30 years old. He says he wrote it imagining he'd give himself a part. Staged at Theatre503 in 2003, it transferred the next year to Battersea Arts Centre. It was well received and he went on to write the controversially titled Osama the Hero which was produced by Hampstead Theatre, beginning a long-running relationship with the theatre.

He wrote After the End in 2005. It was produced by Paines Plough in his first out of London production at the Traverse, though it later came to the Bush Theatre before going on a tour of the UK and internationally in 2006.

Love and Money was staged at the Royal Exchange, Manchester and then at the Young Vic in 2006. That same year his sitcom Pulling, co-written and starring Sharon Horgan, aired on BBC Three. It received good ratings for the channel and was well reviewed, being nominated for a BAFTA TV Award for Best Situation Comedy in 2007.

Returning to theatre and the Hampstead Theatre in 2007, his fake verbatim play Taking Care of Baby was another success for both writer and theatre.

For the 2007 National Theatre Connections Festival, he wrote DeoxyriboNucleic Acid (better known by the title DNA) which after the connections received a professional production alongside The Miracle by Lin Coghlan and Baby Girl by Roy Williams at the National Theatre in the Cottesloe. The play is now used widely in schools and is on several curriculums for GCSE drama.

The second series of Pulling ran in 2008 and won a British Comedy Award. However, the show was not renewed for a third series, although in 2009 an hour-long special closed the series. That same year he also wrote an episode for Series 8 of Spooks.

In 2009, his play Orphans was staged at the Birmingham Repertory Theatre before transferring to the Traverse Theatre in Edinburgh as part of the Edinburgh Festival Fringe.

=== 2010s ===
Kelly was one of the ten writers who took part in writing monologues based on a children's account for a one-off event at the Old Vic Theatre directed by Danny Boyle in London in support of Dramatic Need in 2010. His three monologues were performed by Ben Kingsley, Jenny Jules and Charlie Cox.

In 2010, Kelly returned to the Hampstead Theatre once more for his response to Shakespeare's King Lear, The Gods Weep starring Jeremy Irons, with mixed reviews. His script adapted from Roald Dahl's book for Tim Minchin's production of the musical Matilda proved highly successful, with the musical winning 99 awards between its opening in December 2010 and 2021, and scheduled to continue to run in the West End of London until at least December 2022.

He wrote an adaptation of Pinocchio featuring the songs and score from the Walt Disney film for the National Theatre, opening in December 2017.

Kelly's one-woman play Girls & Boys had its world premiere at the Royal Court Theatre in February 2018, directed by Lyndsey Turner and starring Carey Mulligan. This production also had a run at the off-Broadway New York theatre, Minetta Lane Theatre in June 2018, to good reviews. In March 2022, State Theatre Company South Australia put on a performance of the play at the Odeon Theatre, Norwood in Adelaide as part of the Adelaide Festival. The performance was directed by the artistic director of STCSA, Mitchell Butel, and starred Justine Clarke. This production received overwhelmingly positive reviews, receiving five stars from reviewers and earning a standing ovation at least one performance. In the Netherlands, the play was staged by Theater Oostpool, directed by Daria Bukvić and starring Hadewych Minis, who won the prestigious Theo d'Or prize for her solo performance.

=== International success and other work ===
His work has been produced in Turkey, Germany, Austria, Switzerland, Slovakia, the Netherlands, Ireland, Iceland, the Czech Republic, Bulgaria, Poland, Italy, Australia, Japan, the United States, France, Belgium, Denmark, Romania and Canada.

Other work includes translations of Péter Kárpáti's Fourth Gate (National Theatre Studio) and The Colony, a radio play which won Best European Radio Drama at the Prix Europa, 2004.

== Works ==
=== Film ===
- Matilda the Musical (2022) - Writer (based on the 2010 stage musical)
- Black Sea (2014) - Writer

=== Theatre ===
Original works

- Girls & Boys (2018): premiered at the Royal Court Theatre
- The Ritual Slaughter of Gorge Mastromas (2013): premiered at the Royal Court Theatre
- Things That Make No Sense (2011): performed as part of Theatre Uncut: A Response to the Countrywide Spending Cuts, premiered at Southwark Playhouse
- True Love, Sums and Christmas (2010): monologues performed as part of The Children's Monologues one-off event at the Old Vic Theatre
- The Gods Weep (2010): premiered at the Hampstead Theatre
- Orphans (2009): premiered at the Traverse Theatre transferred to the Soho Theatre
- Our Teacher's a Troll (2009): premiered at Mull Theatre by the National Theatre of Scotland.
- D.N.A. (2008): part of National Theatre Connections
- Pupation (2007): written as a 10-minute play and completed by Natasha Bell, Georgia Lester, Indiana Seresin and Joey Sims, premiered at Hampstead Theatre (Unpublished)
- Murder at Gobbler's Wood (2007): written with Enda Walsh and Robin French, premiered at the Latitude Festival at Henham Park (Unpublished)
- Taking Care of Baby (2007): premiered at the Birmingham Repertory Theatre
- Love and Money (2006): premiered at the Royal Exchange Theatre
- After the End (2005): premiered at the Bush Theatre
- Osama the Hero (2005): premiered at the Hampstead Theatre
- Blackout (2004): premiered at the Soho Theatre (Unpublished)
- Debris (2003): premiered at Theatre503
- Brendan's Visit (1997) premiered at the Etcetera Theatre (Unpublished)

Adaptations and translations

- Pinocchio (2017): music from the 1940 Disney film, premiered at the National Theatre.
- From Morning to Midnight (2013): a translation, original play by Georg Kaiser, premiered at the National Theatre
- Matilda the Musical (2010): music by Tim Minchin, premiered at the Courtyard Theatre
- The Prince of Homburg (2010): a translation, original by Heinrich von Kleist, premiered at the Donmar Warehouse
- Rose Bernd (2005): a translation, original play by Gerhart Hauptmann, premiered at the Arcola Theatre
- The Fourth Gate (2004): a translation, original play by Péter Kárpáti, premiered at the National Theatre

=== Radio ===
- 12 Shares (2005)
- The Colony (2004)

=== Television ===
- Spooks BBC Series 8
- Pulling for BBC Three co written with Sharon Horgan
- Utopia for Channel 4
- The Circuit for Channel 4 co written with Sharon Horgan
- The Third Day for HBO and Sky One
- Together for BBC Two
- Waiting for the Out for BBC One

=== Abandoned, cancelled or unproduced ===
==== Plays ====
- White Pig: a play written around 2002 which Kelly says was about a passive boy with food-obsessed parents who had non-real characters wandering into his life. Kelly has said that, "I used to have lots of these really odd meetings with theatres where I'd go in and they'd tell me how much they loved the play and then tell me they weren't going to do it". The play was eventually performed publicly at Jacksons Lane by students of Mountview on 30 September 2016. However, no professional production has been mounted and the script remains unpublished.
- Fifty-Three Million Miles: a play Kelly says was written early in his career, set variously on a council estate, a NASA interview room, and a living pod on Mars. The play remains unproduced and the script unpublished.

==== Television ====
- Pulling, series 3: the television sitcom Pulling, which Kelly co-wrote with Sharon Horgan, was unexpectedly not renewed for a third series by BBC Three despite Kelly and Horgan both wanting to write another series. Instead, the channel opted for a one-hour special to tie up loose ends of the narrative. The sitcom had received good ratings, critical success and a nomination for a BAFTA award. BBC Three controller Danny Cohen denied claims the channel was chasing a younger audience, saying the series was cancelled to make room for new shows.
- Utopia, series 3 and 4: in October 2014, Channel 4 announced that Kelly's conspiracy thriller Utopia had been cancelled after its second series. Kelly said, "The people who liked it really liked it, but the ratings were just bad. I don't know why. I think going out in the summer didn't help. It's gutting not being able to finish the story. We did want to do a special. We said to Channel 4, ‘I could finish it off with a two-hour special,’ but they weren't going for it. I understand, though. It was a risky show to do." The show's cancellation prompted The Independent in 2015 to publish a list of "The best prematurely cancelled TV shows", with Utopia placed first. In 2017 The Guardian included Utopia in a list of "the best shows that had the plug pulled on them". Publications such as NME and the i newspaper website felt that Netflix should fund a continuation of Utopia for its streaming service. In a 2020 interview about the US remake of Utopia, Kelly said there would be difficulties in making another series but he had not ruled out the possibility.
- Consider Phlebas adaptation: In February 2018, Amazon Studios announced plans to adapt Iain Banks' Consider Phlebas for television, with Kelly as writer. However, development was discontinued in 2020. Kelly said Banks' estate had not yet seen anything he had written for the project but he believed they did not feel ready to proceed.

==== Film ====
- World War Z sequel: in 2015 Kelly was reported to have been hired to rewrite a sequel to World War Z. The film was being developed by Paramount Pictures with Brad Pitt to star, and a release slated for June 2017. In 2019, Paramount reportedly cancelled the sequel due to budgetary issues, the death of executive Brad Grey who was a key advocate for the film, and director David Fincher's involvement with his Mindhunter series. However, The Hollywood Reporter reported the cancellation was mainly due to a Chinese government ban on zombie films.
- The Sandkings: in 2021 Kelly was developing a screenplay with Gore Verbinski based on a George R. R. Martin short story called "Sandkings". The project was in the works at Netflix.

== Awards and honours ==
Awards

Year	Award Ceremony	Category	Nominee	Result	Ref
2023	British Academy Film Awards	Outstanding British Film	Matilda the Musical (film)	Nominated	
2022	British Academy Television Awards	Best Single Drama	Together	Won	
2015	BAFTA TV Craft Awards	Writer – Drama	Utopia	Nominated	
2014	RTS Programme Awards	Drama Series	Utopia	Nominated	
2014	RTS Programme Awards	Writer – Drama	Utopia	Nominated	
2014	BAFTA TV Craft Awards	Writer – Drama	Utopia	Nominated	
2014	International Emmy Awards	Best Drama Series	Utopia	Won	
2013	Tony Awards	Best Book of A Musical	Matilda the Musical	Won	
2013	Outer Critics Circle Awards	Outstanding Book of a Musical (Broadway or Off-Broadway)	Matilda the Musical	Won	
2013	Outer Critics Circle Awards	Outstanding New Broadway Musical	Matilda the Musical	Nominated	
2013	Drama Desk Awards	Outstanding Musical	Matilda the Musical	Won	
2013	Drama Desk Awards	Outstanding Book of a Musical	Matilda the Musical	Won	
2012	South Bank Sky Arts Awards	Theatre prize	Matilda the Musical	Won	
2012	Olivier Awards	Best Musical	Matilda the Musical	Won	
2011	Evening Standard Awards	The Ned Sherrin Award for Best Musical	Matilda the Musical	Won	
2011	Critics' Circle Theatre Award	Best Musical	Matilda the Musical	Won	
2011	TMA UK Theatre Awards	Best Musical	Matilda the Musical	Won	
2011	WhatsOnStage Awards	The SEE TICKETS Best New Musical Award	Matilda the Musical	Won	
2009	The Scotsman	Fringe First Award	Orphans	Won	
2009	The Herald (Glasgow)	Herald Angel Award	Orphans	Won	
2009	British Comedy Award	Best Television Comedy Drama	Pulling	Won	
2009	Theater heute	Best Foreign Playwright	Taking Care of Baby	Won	
2009	The South Bank Show Awards	Comedy Award	Pulling	Won	
2007	TMA Awards	Best New Play	Taking Care of Baby	Nominated	
2007	John Whiting Award		Taking Care of Baby	Won	
2007	Laurence Olivier Awards	Outstanding Achievement in an Affiliate Theatre	Love and Money	Nominated	
2007	BAFTA TV Award	Best Situation Comedy	Pulling	Nominated	
2006	Meyer-Whitworth Award		Osama the Hero	Won	
2004	Radio & Music Award	Scripting for Broadcast	The Colony	Won	
2004	Prix Europa	Best European Radio Drama Of The Year	The Colony	Won	

Honours

On 9 November 2015, Mountview Academy of Theatre Arts awarded both Kelly and Matilda co-collaborator Tim Minchin an Honorary Doctorate in letters, validated by the University of East Anglia, for their work on Matilda the Musical.

In July 2017 Kelly received an 'Honorary Fellowship' from Goldsmiths, University of London.
