= Laurence Olivier Award for Outstanding Achievement in an Affiliate Theatre =

Annual award for London theatre

- Awarded for: Outstanding Achievement in an Affiliate Theatre
- Location: England
- Presented by: Society of London Theatre
- First award: 2004
- Currently held by: The Glass Menagerie at The Yard Theatre (2026)
- Website: officiallondontheatre.com/olivier-awards/

The Laurence Olivier Award for Outstanding Achievement in an Affiliate Theatre is an annual award presented by the Society of London Theatre in recognition of the "world-class status of London theatre." The awards were established as the Society of West End Theatre Awards in 1976, and renamed in 1984 in honour of English actor and director Laurence Olivier.

This award, introduced in 2004, recognizes excellence in theatre works throughout London, beyond the West End theatres that are considered for all the original Olivier Awards. This award also includes works performed by junior companies, or in smaller rooms, within the traditional West End theatres.

== Winners and nominees ==
=== 2000s ===
Year	Recipient	Production
2004
2004	Young Vic	Season Under the Artistic Direction of David Lan
2004	Almeida Theatre	The Lady from the Sea
2004	Tanika Gupta	Fragile Land and Hobson's Choice
2004	Lyric Hammersmith	Pericles, Prince of Tyre
2005
2005	Andrew Scott	A Girl in a Car with a Man
2005	Kevin Harvey	Yellowman
2005	Aidan McArdle	The Shadow of a Gunman
2005	Tricycle Theatre	Guantanamo
2006
2006	Bloody Sunday: Scenes from the Saville Inquiry	Performances at the Tricycle Theatre
2006	Comfort Me with Apples	Performances at the Hampstead Theatre
2006	My Name Is Rachel Corrie	Performances Jerwood Theatre Upstairs at the Royal Court Theatre
2006	Laura Wade	Breathing Corpses and Colder Than Here
2007
2007	Pied Piper (Boy Blue)	Performances at Theatre Royal, Stratford East
2007	Theatre Royal, Stratford East	Season of Work
2007	Love and Money	Performances at the Young Vic
2007	Roy Dotrice	The Best of Friends
2008
2008	Gone Too Far!	Performances at the Jerwood Theatre Upstairs at the Royal Court Theatre
2008	The Brothers Size	Performances at the Young Vic
2008	Cinderella	Performances at Theatre Royal, Stratford East
2008	The Cast	That Face
2009
2009	The Pride	Performances at the Jerwood Theatre Upstairs at the Royal Court Theatre
2009	The Cast	Oxford Street
2009	Clive Rowe	Mother Goose
2009	Jo Newbery	Scarborough

=== 2010s ===
Year	Recipient	Production
2010
2010	Royal Court Theatre	Cock
2010	Soho Theatre and Tiata Fahodzi	Iya Ile (The First Wife)
2010	Tricycle Theatre	The Great Game: Afghanistan
2011
2011	Lyric Hammersmith	Blasted
2011	Soho Theatre and ATC	Ivan and the Dogs
2011	Royal Court Theatre and Drum Theatre, Plymouth	The Empire
2011	Trafalgar Studios 2 and Donmar Warehouse	Les Parents terribles
2012
2012	Theatre Royal Stratford East	Roadkill
2012	Royal Exchange Theatre with Lyric, Hammersmith	Mogadishu
2012	Donmar Warehouse with Trafalgar Studios 2	Salt, Root and Roe
2012	Jerwood Theatre Upstairs at the Royal Court Theatre	The Village Bike
2013
2013	Jerwood Theatre Upstairs at the Royal Court Theatre	Season of New Writing
2013	Caroline Horton	You're Not Like the Other Girls Chrissy
2013	Kate Bond and Morgan Lloyd	You Me Bum Bum Train
2013	Tricycle Theatre	Red Velvet
2014
2014	Handbagged	Performances at Tricycle Theatre
2014	Cush Jumbo	Josephine and I
2014	Fleabag	Performances at Soho Theatre
2014	Oh, What a Lovely War!	Performances at Theatre Royal Stratford East
2015
2015	Bull	Performances at the Young Vic, Maria
2015	Four Minutes Twelve Seconds	Performances at the Hampstead Theatre, Downstairs
2015	Tanya Moodie	Intimate Apparel and The Home That Will Not Stand
2015	Juma Sharkah	Liberian Girl
2016
2016	Pat Kinevane and Fishamble for Silent	Performances at the Soho Theatre
2016	Barbarians	Performances at the Young Vic, Clare
2016	Phil Dunster	Pink Mist
2016	Violence and Son	Performances at the Jerwood Theatre Upstairs, Royal Court
2017
2017	Rotterdam	Performances at Trafalgar Studios 2
2017	Cuttin' It	Performances at Young Vic / Royal Court - Young Vic, Maria
2017	The Government Inspector	Performances at Theatre Royal Stratford East
2017	The Invisible Hand	Performances at Tricycle
2017	It Is Easy To Be Dead	Performances at Trafalgar Studios 2
2018
2018	Killology	Performances at Jerwood Theatre Upstairs, Royal Court
2018	The B*easts	Performances at Bush Theatre
2018	The Red Lion	Performances at Trafalgar Studios 2
2018	The Revlon Girl	Performances at Park Theatre
2019
2019	Flesh and Bone	Performances at the Soho Theatre
2019	Moe Bar-El	Every Day I Make Greatness Happen
2019	Jonathan Hyde	Gently Down the Stream
2019	The Phlebotomist	Performances at the Hampstead Theatre Downstairs
2019	Athena Stevens	Schism

=== 2020s ===
Year	Production	Theatre
2020
2020	Baby Reindeer	Bush Theatre
2020	Blues in the Night	Kiln Theatre
2020	Our Lady of Kibeho	Theatre Royal Stratford East
2020	Seven Methods of Killing Kylie Jenner	Jerwood Theatre Upstairs at the Royal Court Theatre
2020	War Heads	Park Theatre
2021	Not presented due to extended closing of theatre productions during COVID-19 pandemic (Note: Due to late March 2020 to late July 2021 closing of London theatre productions during the COVID-19 pandemic in England, the 2022 awards recognise productions that launched anytime from February 2020 to February 2022)	
2022
2022	Old Bridge	Bush Theatre
2022	10 Nights	Bush Theatre
2022	Folk	Hampstead Theatre Downstairs
2022	The Invisible Hand	Kiln Theatre
2022	A Place For We	Park Theatre
2023
2023	The P Word	Bush Theatre
2023	Age Is a Feeling	Soho Theatre
2023	Blackout Songs	Hampstead Theatre Downstairs
2023	Paradise Now!	Bush Theatre
2023	Two Palestinians Go Dogging	Jerwood Theatre Upstairs at Royal Court Theatre
2024
2024	Sleepova	Bush Theatre
2024	Blue Mist	Jerwood Theatre Upstairs at Royal Court Theatre
2024	A Playlist for the Revolution	Bush Theatre
2024	The Swell	Orange Tree Theatre
2024	The Time Machine: A Comedy	Park Theatre
2025
2025	Boys on the Verge of Tears	Soho Theatre
2025	Animal Farm	Theatre Royal Stratford East
2025	English	Kiln Theatre
2025	Now, I See	Theatre Royal Stratford East
2025	What We Talk About When We Talk About Anne Frank	Marylebone Theatre
2026
2026	The Glass Menagerie	Yard Theatre
2026	Ben and Imo	Orange Tree Theatre
2026	The Ministry of Lesbian Affairs	Kiln Theatre
2026	Miss Myrtle's Garden	Bush Theatre
2026	The Shitheads	Royal Court Theatre
