= Matilda Feyiṣayọ Ibini =

Nigerian-British playwright

- Born: London
- Education: Metropolitan University; City University
- Occupations: playwright, screenwriter

Matilda Feyiṣayọ Ibini is a Nigerian-British playwright and screenwriter.

== Education ==
Ibini has a BA in English literature and creative writing (2013) from London Metropolitan University, and an MA, with distinction, in playwriting and screen writing from City University, for which she was awarded a scholarship from BAFTA and Warner Bros.

== Writing ==
Ibini's first play Muscovado was performed at Theatre503 in 2015; it is set in Barbados in 1808 and Time Out described it as "A small but satisfying drama about the British involvement in the slave trade". The play was one of three winners of the Audience Award of the Alfred Fagon Award for 2015.

Little Miss Burden was performed at The Bunker in 2019, telling the story of three Nigerian sisters, one of whom uses a wheelchair. The Stage's reviewer called it "a gem of a play".

The Unexpected Expert was broadcast by BBC Four in May 2020 as part of its series Unprecedented of plays written during and about COVID-19 lockdown. It shows a disabled influencer being told by a council worker that her support will be cut during lockdown.

Her 2020 Caring, cowritten with Gabriel Bisset-Smith, is "A horror-comedy about a disabled woman who finally finds a good carer — only to discover the carer is a serial killer.", and was among the 14 scripts (from 246 entrants) which were selected for the 2020 Brit List of the year's best unproduced scripts. In 2020 it was reported that shooting was planned for summer 2021.

Her play Sleepova, produced at the Bush Theatre, won her the 2023 Critics' Circle Theatre Award for Most Promising Playwright, jointly with Marcelo Dos Santos, and was nominated in the 2024 Laurence Olivier Awards for "Outstanding Achievement in Affiliate Theatre".

== Personal life ==
Ibini describes herself as bionic and queer, explaining: "I adopted the term 'bionic' when I became a full-time wheelchair user and had metal implanted into my leg after a traumatic fracture, even though the term encompasses my experiences from birth, that I have always needed some form of technology, equipment, or adaptation to live." She has Limb–girdle muscular dystrophy.
