= After the End (play) =

Play by Dennis Kelly

- Original language: English
- Written by: Dennis Kelly
- Characters: Mark (male); Louise (female)
- Mute: A Guard
- Genre: in-yer-face theatre

Premiere
- Date: 2005; Traverse
- Place: Britain

After the End is a psychological thriller play by Dennis Kelly which premiered in 2005 produced by Paines Plough at the Traverse (Edinburgh) and then at the Bush Theatre (London), directed by Roxana Silbert and starring Tom Brooke and Kerry Condon. The play is in four parts, titled "Beginning", "Middle", "End", and "After the End".

== Characters ==
- Louise - a popular young office worker
- Mark - her colleague from the reprographic department

== Synopsis ==
Louise wakes up in an underground nuclear fallout shelter. Mark says he rescued her from the carnage of a nuclear attack, and brought her to safety in the old shelter in his garden. She finds he has kept it stocked with tinned chilli. Isolated from the world, he tries to strong-arm her, at first to play Dungeons and Dragons with him. This psychological battle escalates as the days pass.

== Reviews ==
- The Guardian
- British Theatre Guide
- The Times
- New York Times

== Other productions ==
After The End is being revived at Theatre Royal Stratford East in early 2022, directed by Lyndsey Turner and starring Nick Blood and Amaka Okafor. It is the first major London revival of the play since its premiere in 2005. The play has also been performed internationally, including in Ireland, France ("Après la Fin"), Germany ("Nach dem Ende"), Italy and The Netherlands.
