= The Ritual Slaughter of Gorge Mastromas =

- Written by: Dennis Kelly

The Ritual Slaughter of Gorge Mastromas is a 2013 play by the British dramatist Dennis Kelly. It premiered at the Royal Court Theatre from 5 September to 19 October 2013, in a production directed by Vicky Featherstone. It featured Tom Brooke in the title role of Gorge (pronounced "George") Mastromas and a cast which included Pippa Haywood, Joshua James, Kate O'Flynn, Alan Williams, Jonathan McGuiness and Aaron Monaghan.

== Plot ==
A prologue divided between all seven actors described Mastromas' early life. He is then seen attending a meeting as a staff-member at a failing restaurant chain, where the chairman is agonising over an oncoming takeover. A businesswoman arrives and talks to the chairman, then to Mastromas alone, tempting him to betray the chairman to profit from the takeover himself. He does so and becomes a high-flying successful businessman. He falls in love with his employee Louisa but finds it impossible to woo her, until he bribes her counsellor and therapist to reveal details of her childhood sexual abuse by her father. These he uses to fake a suicide attempt and - having been told that she falls in love empathetically - he tells her a long and sustained lie that he was abused by his father too.

Louisa marries him and Mastromas writes a best-selling memoir of his wholly fictional childhood abuse. His elder brother, who has changed his name to Gel, finds Mastromas. Feeling betrayed that Mastromas has sullied their father's memory, he announces that he is about to reveal the truth to a journalist. Mastromas fakes a reconciliation but then kills Gel, only to have Louisa leave him after having been contacted by the journalist. The final scene shows the old and reclusive Mastromas being visited by Pete, who turns out to be his grandson via a child Mastromas fathered before his rise to riches.
