= Non zero one =

Non zero one (formed 2009) are an artist collective formed of Sarah Butcher, Iván González, Cat Harrison, John Hunter, Fran Miller and Alex Turner. They also work with other artists in association. The collective formed in early 2009, after meeting one another via their undergraduate studies at Royal Holloway, University of London.

The collective make interactive theatre that sometimes uses game mechanics and digital technology (such as headphones) in order to put the audience at the centre of the work. They often explore the connections between people - whether it be what it is that makes people a 'team', in The Time Out, to the instructions over headphones in Would like to meet, which attempts to ask 'Can you miss someone you've never met?'" or the "Ghosts" of actors past and present in this Is where we got to when you came in.

== Shows ==
Would Like to Meet - 2009–2010. Debuted as part of the company's undergraduate degree programme at Royal Holloway, University of London in 2009. The show was then supported by a Farnham Maltings 'No Strings Attached' grant, before being fully commissioned by the Barbican Centre where it ran in Spring of 2010 as part of their Bite10 festival. The piece is an intricately timed interactive headphone work designed for 6 people, each of whom are guided by a different recorded voice. Alex Turner is quoted as saying that the piece aims to pose "the question: 'Can you miss someone you've never met?'"

They Vote with Their Feet - 2009. A 'scratch' (early stages performance test) performance at Battersea Arts Centre in September 2009.

Hold Hands/Lock Horns - 2010. Developed after the company won a Farnham Maltings 'No Strings Attached' grant, following they vote with their feet at Battersea Arts Centre. Described as an 'interactive game', or 'interactive theatre performance', this piece is 15 minutes long, and is a one-on-one performance, made for one member of the company, and one audience member, and explores "how people can be held accountable for the choices they make".

This is Where We Got to When You Came In - 2011. Devised for the pub theatre venue that The Bush Theatre moved out of in 2011. A show that traces a tour of the backstage areas of The Bush's pub venue of 40 years.

The Time Out - 2011. Developed at the National Theatre Studio, and performed at Latitude Festival 2011, Forest Fringe 2011, before touring to Tate Britain in October 2011, The Junction in November 2011. In an interview with The Junction Theatre, the collective are quoted as saying that "the time out is about teamwork. When we first started work on the piece about a year ago, we were enthralled by questions like: what is it that makes a team? How long do you have to be with a group of people to feel they are your team? What is it you have to experience? How does a team survive?" The show is 1 hour long and is an interactive experience for up to 12 audience members.

== Awards and accolades ==
- Received the 2012 Offie for Best Entertainment - this is where we got to when you came in at The Bush Theatre
- Voted 'coolest company' by Elle Magazine (Sept 2011) The show is 1 hour long and is an interactive experience for up to 12 audience members
- Lyn Gardner of The Guardian's New Edinburgh Act of the Day on 17 August 2011
