= D. C. Moore =

British playwright and screenwriter

- Born: David Moore; 1980 (age 45–46); Duston, Northamptonshire, England
- Occupations: Playwright, screenwriter
- Writing career
- Period: 2007–present

David "D. C." Moore (born 1980) is a British playwright and television screenwriter.

== Biography ==
He was raised in Duston, Northamptonshire. Now based in London, he started out as an assistant director and worked with Rupert Goold on productions of The Weir and Waiting for Godot. He was then part of the Royal Court Theatre's Young Writers' Programme. His first play Alaska was produced upstairs at the Royal Court in 2007, and he won the inaugural Tom Erhardt Award for promising new playwright in 2008.

His second play at the Royal Court, The Empire, about young men in the War in Afghanistan, opened in 2010 and received positive reviews. On the strength of that play he was nominated for the 2010 Evening Standard Award for Most Promising Playwright. The play was nominated for the 2010 Olivier Awards in the Outstanding Achievement in an Affiliate Theatre category.

Honest, a 45-minute monologue, was produced by Royal & Derngate in Northampton in 2010 at the Mailcoach pub and also received good reviews. It was then revived at the 2010 Edinburgh Fringe Festival at Milne's Bar as part of the Assembly programme. It is being revived once more for the Edinburgh Fringe in 2014 by Organised Crime Theatre Company at The Space @ Jury's Inn.

Commissioned by Royal & Derngate, Moore's play Town is a contemporary story inspired by local 19th-century poet John Clare's struggle with madness and his walk from London to Northampton.

His play The Swan premiered as part of a double feature in a production staged in the National Theatre's Paintframe, where the sets are usually painted, in 2011.

He has also written for television, creating the 2015 comedy-drama series Not Safe for Work and contributing episodes of Killing Eve and Temple. Moore created the historical drama Mary & George, based on Benjamin Woolley's non-fiction book The King's Assassin. The series focuses on George Villiers, 1st Duke of Buckingham, a key figure in the reigns of James I and Charles I, and his scheming mother Mary Villiers, played by Julianne Moore (no relation). It premiered in 2024 on Starz and the UK's History Channel.

== Bibliography ==
- Alaska (2007): Jerwood Theatre Upstairs, Royal Court Theatre
- The Empire (2010): Jerwood Theatre Upstairs, Royal Court Theatre
- Honest (2010): Mailcoach Pub (Northampton)
- Town (2010): Royal Theatre (Northampton)
- The Swan (2011): The Paintframe, National Theatre
- Straight (2012): Sheffield Crucible and Bush Theatre
- Another Place (2014): Theatre Royal, Plymouth
- Common (2017): National Theatre, London
