= Orphans (Dennis Kelly play) =

Play written by Dennis Kelly

- Orphans by Dennis Kelly at the Vinohrady Theatre, 2024 (directed by Barbora Mašková)
- Original language: English
- Written by: Dennis Kelly
- Characters: Helen; Danny; Liam
- Mute: Shane
- Genre: Drama

Premiere
- Date: 9 August 2009
- Place: Traverse Theatre in Edinburgh

Orphans is a 2009 play by London playwright Dennis Kelly, an exploration of violence in urban areas. Kelly said “I always want my plays to have tension; whether the audience hates it or loves it is up to them, but I never want them to be bored.”

== Synopsis ==
Helen and her husband Danny are celebrating the news that Helen is newly pregnant with their second child with a quiet night in, but it is interrupted by Helen's brother Liam, who arrives covered in blood claiming to have found a young lad injured on the street. When Liam's recollection of the event begins to change under questioning, suspicions are aroused followed by increasing concern that he may have been more involved than first thought. Liam explains the events stage by stage, causing him to accidentally reveal that he committed a racially motivated hate crime. Helen coerces Danny to intimidate Liam's victim in order to prevent him from going to the police. When Danny and Liam return, Helen orders Liam to leave their home. Danny, shaken by what he's done and disgusted by Helen's morally bankrupt behaviour over the course of the night, tells Helen he wants her to abort her pregnancy.

== Characters ==
- Helen was orphaned after a fire and brought up in care with her brother Liam. She is Danny's wife and is newly pregnant with her second child.
- Danny is Helen's husband.
- Liam was orphaned after a fire and brought up in care, and is grateful to his sister believing that she is the reason they were never separated.
- Shane is Helen and Danny's five-year-old son. (Non-speaking part.)

== Stage productions ==
Roxana Silbert directed the first production of this play, which premiered at the Traverse Theatre Edinburgh in August 2009, followed by a short run at the Birmingham Repertory Theatre in September, and finally the Soho Theatre London in October. The production starred Claire-Louise Cordwell as Helen, Jonathan McGuinness as Danny and Joe Armstrong as Liam. The play won a Herald Angel Award at the Edinburgh Fringe Festival and received numerous favourable reviews.
