= Jade Anouka =

English actress and poet (born 1989)

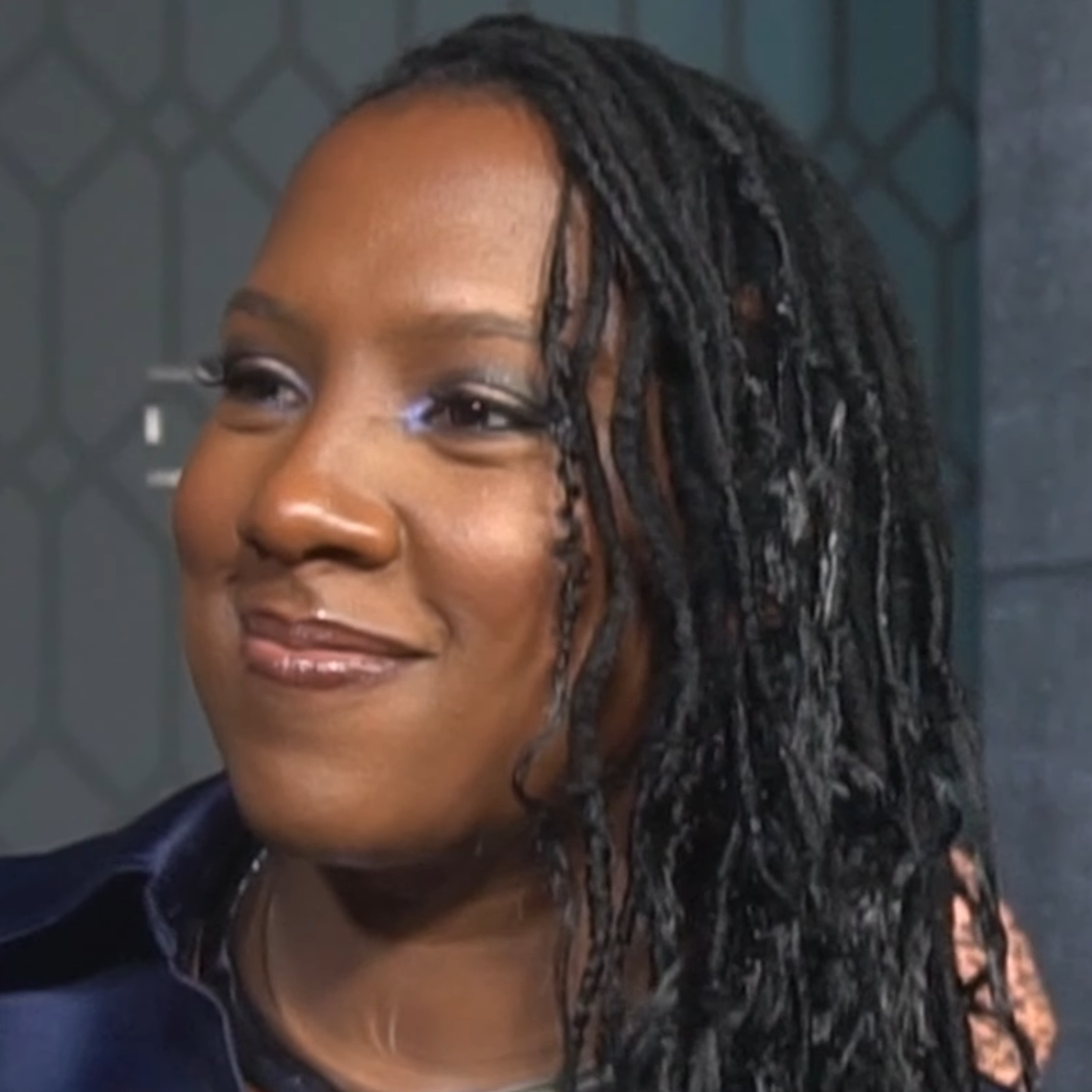
- Born: Jade Anouka; 12 June 1989 (age 37); Slade Green, London, England
- Education: Guildford School of Acting
- Occupations: Actress; poet
- Years active: 2007–present
- Spouse: Grace Savage (m. 2022)
- Children: 2
- Website: Official website

Jade Anouka (born 12 June 1989) is an English actress. She is known for her various stage roles and for her appearances in His Dark Materials on BBC One and the ITV dramas Trauma and Cleaning Up.

== Early life and education ==
Anouka was born in London, the second of three children born to a maths teacher mother from Trinidad and a mortgage advisor father from Jamaica. She has a brother and a sister who pursued careers in science. She grew up in Slade Green and attended school in Bexley, London, but transferred to a school in Lewisham for sixth form. She ran track prior to transferring to Lewisham, as she did not want to compete against her old teammates.

Anouka took her first steps into acting while attending a Saturday morning drama club in Dartford, Kent. While at sixth form, Anouka received a scholarship to the National Youth Theatre and then attended the Guildford School of Acting. She was hired immediately after graduation by the Royal Shakespeare Company in Stratford-upon-Avon, where she earned a postgraduate award in teaching Shakespeare.

== Career ==
Anouka made her stage debut in 2007 with a role in Margaret Atwood's The Penelopiad. In 2011, she received a commendation at the Ian Charleson Awards for her 2010 performance as Ophelia in Hamlet at Shakespeare's Globe.

Anouka had small television roles in Doctor Who (2013), Chewing Gum (2015), and Stan Lee's Lucky Man before getting a supporting role in the 2018 miniseries Trauma. She appeared in a 2020 episode (S9:E3) of Death in Paradise.

In 2014, she received the Stage Award for Acting Excellence for her one-woman show, Sabrina Mahfouz's Chef, at the Edinburgh Fringe Festival. In 2015, she brought the show to London for a week of special performances. In 2017, she appeared in the short film Baby Gravy, for which she won the Best Actress award at the New Renaissance Film Festival.

Anouka took part in Phyllida Lloyd's all-female Shakespeare trilogy, starring as Mark Antony in Julius Caesar at the Donmar Warehouse, Hotspur in Henry IV at the Donmar Theatre, and Ariel in The Tempest at the King's Cross Theatre, and at Off-Broadway's St. Ann's Warehouse. She earned rave reviews for her roles in the three plays, which were broadcast on the BBC in 2018. In 2018, she also played Margaret of Anjou in Jeanie O'Hare's Queen Margaret, at the Royal Exchange, Manchester. She was named among the InStyle BAFTA Breakout Stars for 2018.

In 2019, Anouka appeared in Cleaning Up, a six-part drama on ITV and the Netflix series Turn Up Charlie.

In August 2020, she confirmed that she was to appear as Ruta Skadi in series two of the BBC/HBO fantasy drama His Dark Materials.

Anouka performs her poetry on stage, and in 2016, she published a volume of her poetry called Eggs on Toast.

In 2021, it was announced that Anouka would star alongside Jonathan Bailey, Taron Egerton and Phil Daniels in a production of Mike Bartlett's Cock at the Ambassadors Theatre, London, in 2022.

== Personal life ==
Anouka is queer and bisexual. On 14 December 2021, Anouka announced that she had given birth to a daughter. In May 2022, Anouka married musician Grace Savage. On 25 February 2024, Anouka announced she and her wife had had another baby.

== Filmography ==
Key
†	Denotes productions that have not yet been released

=== Film ===
Year	Title	Role	Notes
2009	That Serious Face	Kellie	Short film
2010	Love's Labour's Lost	Maria	Direct-to-video
2012	A Running Jump	Jody's Friend	Short film
2013	T-Police Field	Police Officer	Short film
2015	The Vote	Chika Devan	TV film
2017	Baby Gravy	Alex	Short film
2019	Fisherman's Friends	Leah Jordan	
2019	Last Christmas	Alba	
2020	6:23 AM		Short film
2020	The Rhythm Section	Laura Fuller	
2020	Her & Her	Her	Short film
2020	Morbid Curiosity	Newsreader	Short film
2021	Zebra Girl	Anita	
2021	Ear for Eye	UK Woman	
2022	Fisherman's Friends: One and All	Leah Jordan	Post-production
2022	The Bower	Terri (1991)	Short film
TBA	The Dark Channel†	Mia	Post-production
TBA	Shaun†	Beth	Pre-production

=== Television ===
Year	Title	Role	Notes
2007	USS Constellation: Battling for Freedom	Conjo's Mother	TV special
2010	Law & Order: UK	Carla	Episode: "Skeletons"
2012	Secrets and Words	Ashley	Episode: "Mightier Than the Sword"
2013	Doctor Who	Waitress	Episode: "The Bells of Saint John"
2016	Stan Lee's Lucky Man	Ekua Nkomo	Episode: "A Twist of Fate"
2017	Chewing Gum	Danny	Episode: "WTF Happened?"
2017–2018	The Donmar Warehouse's All-Female Shakespeare Trilogy	Mark Antony/Hotspur/Ariel	Mini-series, 3 episodes
2018	Trauma	Alana Allerton	Mini-series, 3 episodes
2019	Cleaning Up	Jess	Series regular, 6 episodes
2019	Turn Up Charlie	Tommi	Series regular, 6 episodes
2019	Great Performances	Marcus Antonius	Episode: "Julius Caesar"
2020	Death in Paradise	Inez Farah	Episode: "Tour De Murder"
2020	Small Axe	Mrs. Morrison	Episode: "Education"
2020–2022	His Dark Materials	Ruta Skadi	Series regular, 5 episodes
2021	The Drowning	Yasmin	Mini-series, 4 episodes
2021	Angela Black	Dr. Cath Bradford	Episode: "Series 1, Episode 3"
2021	Beforeigners	Adepero	Recurring role, 3 episodes
2024	Dune: Prophecy	Sister Theodosia	Main role

=== Theatre ===
Year	Title	Role	Venue	Notes
	Handa's Surprise	Handa	Little Angel Theatre, London	
2007	The Penelopiad	Melantho	Swan Theatre, Swan Theatre, Stratford-upon-Avon & National Arts Centre, Ottawa	with Royal Shakespeare Company
2008	The Merchant of Venice	Portia's Serving Woman	Courtyard Theatre, Stratford-upon-Avon	with Royal Shakespeare Company
2008	The Taming of the Shrew	Nicholas/Dancer	Courtyard Theatre, Stratford-upon-Avon	with Royal Shakespeare Company
2008	Twelfth Night	Olivia	Theatre Royal, York	
2009	Blood Wedding	Bride	Southwark Playhouse, London	
2009	Love's Labour's Lost	Maria	Shakespeare's Globe, London	also, USA tour
2010	Wild Horses	Zoe	Theatre503, London	
2011	Romeo and Juliet	Juliet	Octagon Theatre, Bolton	
2011	Hamlet	Ophelia	Shakespeare's Globe, London	
2012	Moon on a Rainbow Shawl	Rosa	Royal National Theatre, London	
2012	Julius Caesar	Calpurnia/Metellus Cimber/Pindarus	Donmar Warehouse, London	
2013	Romeo and Juliet	Juliet	Shakespeare's Globe, London	
2013	Clean	Chloe	Traverse Theatre, Edinburgh	
2013	Julius Caesar	Calpurnia/Metellus Cimber/Pindarus	St. Ann's Warehouse, New York City	
2014	Clean	Chloe	59E59 Theaters, New York City	
2014	Omeros	Helen	Sam Wanamaker Playhouse, London	
2014	Chef	Chef	Underbelly, Edinburgh	part of Edinburgh Festival Fringe
2015	Henry IV	Hotspur	Donmar Warehouse, London	
2015	The Vote	PC Chika Devan	Donmar Warehouse, London	
2015	Chef	Chef	Soho Theatre, London	
2015	So Here We Are	Kirsty	Royal Exchange, Manchester & HighTide Festival, Aldeburgh	
2015	Henry IV	Hotspur	St. Ann's Warehouse, New York City	
2016	Doctor Faustus	Wagner	Duke of York's Theatre, London	
2017	Cover My Tracks	Sarah	The Old Vic, London	
2018	The Greatest Wealth		The Old Vic, London	
2019	Dear Elizabeth	Queen Margaret	Gate Theatre, London	
2019	The Phlebotomist	Bea	Hampstead Theatre, London	
2022	Cock	W	Ambassadors Theatre	

=== Video games ===
Year	Title	Voice role
2019	Control	Helen Marshall
2020	Control: The Foundation	Helen Marshall
