= Declan Feenan =

Declan Feenan (born 1980) is a playwright from Northern Ireland. His plays have been produced in Belfast, London, Edinburgh, Dublin, Raleigh, North Carolina, and New York City.

== List of plays ==
- Limbo
- Catherine Medbh
- St Petersburg

== Short films ==
- 99,100
