= Norwich Film Festival =

Film festival based in Norwich, England

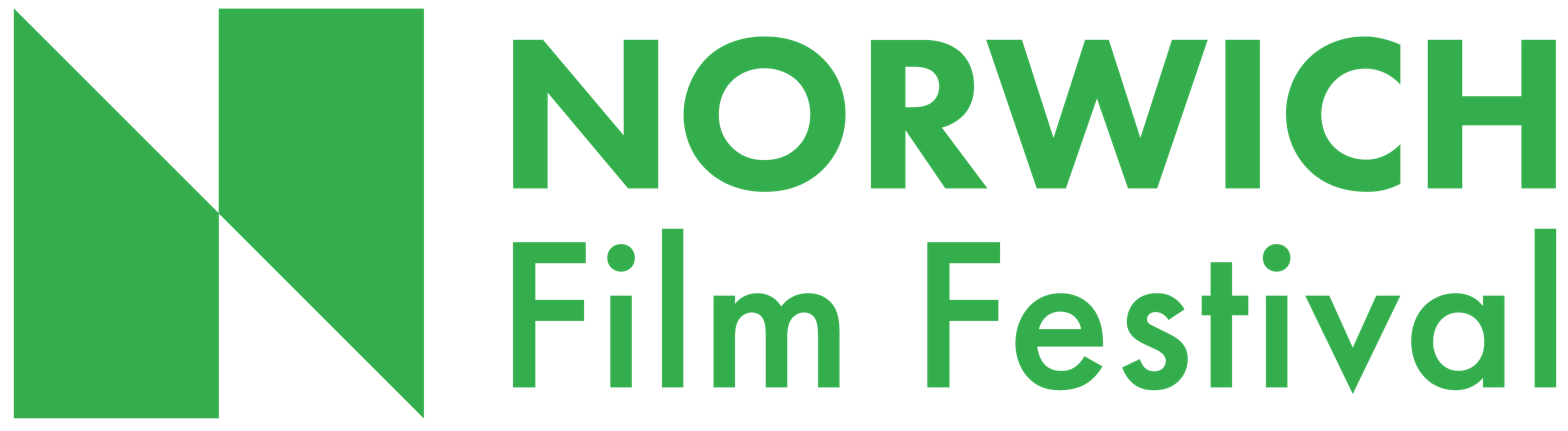
- Norwich Film Festival logo
- Status: Active
- Genre: Film festival
- Date: 3–16 November 2025
- Frequency: Annually
- Venue: Cinema City, Norwich
- Location: Norwich
- Country: United Kingdom
- Years active: 17
- Inaugurated: 2009
- Website: www.norwichfilmfestival.co.uk

Norwich Film Festival is a BAFTA and BIFA qualifying short film festival founded in 2009 and held in Norwich, England, which showcases films by local, national and international filmmakers, both independent and mainstream. Various films have gone on to win BAFTAs and Oscars, as well as awards at the Sundance Film Festival, Tribeca Festival and South by Southwest.

The festival has received support from various celebrities, such as Olivia Colman, Stephen Fry, Tim McInnerney, Julian Jarrold and John Collee. Entries can also qualify to be shortlisted at the BAFTAs or the British Independent Film Awards.

== History ==
Norwich Film Festival was founded in 2009 as a one-off event by local film enthusiast Kellen Playford in order to help screen a short film for a friend. In 2012, the festival was relaunched as an annual event. In 2017, Norwich Film Festival became a registered charity. In the same year it became a BIFA qualifying short festival, before becoming a category B BAFTA qualifying festival in 2019.

Since its inception it has hosted over 250 different events, screening over 1400 short films to members of the public. It has also awarded over £50,000 in prize money to award winners.

== Festival editions ==
=== 2009 ===
Venue: The Forum, Norwich, 12–25 September 2009

The festival began with a screening of My Imprisoned Heart at the Norwich Arts Centre, and included several other events such as a free, open air screening of the 80's film Top Gun in the gardens of Norwich Castle, the regional premiere of Creation, starring Paul Bettany, and screenings of the BAFTA short film and animation nominees.

=== 2012 ===
Venues: Hollywood Cinema, Norwich and The Forum, Norwich, 30 March-7 April 2012

Jury: Bernard Hill, Tim McInnerny, Juliet Stevenson, Steve Furst, and Jim Field Smith.

=== 2013 ===
Venue: Cinema City, Norwich, 28 April-4 May 2013

Jury: Olivia Colman, Radio 1 DJ Edith Bowman, UEA lecturer Dr Sarah Godfrey, and the director of the 2012 Best Film (Sunny Boy), Jane Gull.

=== 2014 ===
Main Venue: ODEON, Norwich, 6–13 May 2014

Jury: Academy Award winning film editor Martin Walsh.

=== 2015 ===
Venue: The Forum, Norwich, 10–26 April 2015

Jury:

=== 2016 ===
Main Venue: The Forum, Norwich, 10–13 November 2016

The 2016 festival opened with a gala screening of the film Kinky Boots and was followed by a Q&A with the film's director Julian Jarrold. The screening reflected the film by taking place in an old shoe factory. The festival also gave regional premieres to two feature films - My Feral Heart, which included a Q&A with Duncan Paveling (writer/producer) and James Rumsey (producer), and Light Years, which was followed by a Q&A with its award-winning director Esther May Campbell. There were six screenings of short films submitted to the festival, and the weekend closed with a screening of the 2016 BAFTA Shorts Tour, with another Q&A afterwards.

Jury:

=== 2017 ===
9–19 November 2017
Venues: OPEN, Norwich, The Forum, Norwich, Assembly House

The 2017 Festival launched on 9 November with a screening of the 1984 film A Private Function followed by a Q&A with the star of the film, Michael Palin.

Jury:

=== 2018 ===
7–18 November 2018

Venues: OPEN, Norwich, The Forum, Norwich, Assembly House, Norwich University of the Arts, The Garage, Norwich.

The 2018 festival kicked off with a screening of cult British classic, Shallow Grave, followed by a talk with its star, Christopher Eccleston.

Jury: Alfred Molina, double British Academy of Film and Television Arts winning sound editor Eddy Joseph, and Cannes Film Festival winning shorts producer, Gavin Humphries.

=== 2019 ===
4–17 November 2019

Venues: OPEN, Norwich, The Forum, Norwich, Assembly House, Theatre Royal, Norwich, Norwich University of the Arts, University of East Anglia, The Garage, Norwich.

The 2019 festival launched on 4 November 2019 with an 'In Conversation' event with British actor David Morrissey, hosted by film critic Peter Bradshaw. The 2019 festival consisted of 44 events, including 19 shorts screenings and a rare UK screening of Snowpiercer hosted by Mark Kermode to launch The Sir John Hurt Film Trust. Guests throughout the festival also included Jessica Hynes, Michael Smiley, Joe Cornish, Miranda Raison and Anwen, Lady Hurt.

A total of 111 short films were selected to be screened at the festival from a total of 817 submissions, with female filmmakers directing 44% of the official selection.

Jury: Stephen Fry, Neve Campbell, and Stephen Woolley.

=== 2020 ===
2–29 November 2020

Venues: Online

Short film submissions opened in January 2020 with a record number of submissions being received over a six-month period, with 132 short films being selected to be screened, making it the festival's largest selection to-date.

On Tuesday 1 September, the festival announced that the 2020 edition would take place in an alternative format due to the ongoing COVID-19 pandemic, with each of the 132 shorts films within the Official Selection being available to watch online for the first time in the festival's history. This would also mark the first time that the festival was able to be accessed by those outside of the UK, with around half of the Official Selection being available internationally.

In total, 151 films were screened online during the festival, including several guest strands from other institutions, and the two winners of the EAFA Mashup Filmmaking competition.

Jury: Dexter Fletcher, Stephen Woolley, James Marsh, Arianne Sutner, Jill Culton, Julie Lockhart, Lisa Cortés, Stuart Dryburgh, Will Becher, Todd Banhazl, Kate Phillips, Antonio Aakeel & Tim Downie.

=== 2021 ===
12–21 November 2021

Over 140 short films were screened in-person and online during the festival's hybrid event for 2021. Due to the ongoing COVID-19 pandemic, the festival took place in a hybrid format, with screenings taking place in-person before becoming available to watch online afterwards and until the end of November. The in-person events consisted of a downscaled programme of shorts screenings, features and talks. The festival also produced a podcast in which filmmakers from the selection were interviewed about their films.

Venues: The Forum, Norwich, The Garage, Norwich, Norwich University of the Arts, National Centre for Writing & Online.

Jury: Michael Sheen, Edith Bowman and Jessica Hynes.

=== 2022 ===
12–20 November 2022

Venues: The Forum, Norwich, University of East Anglia, Norwich University of the Arts

Jury: Nat Luurtsema, Greg Sorvig, Dionne Farrell, Jinko Gotoh, Ida Melum, Crispin Buxton, Chris Rankin, Victoria Emslie, Christine Lalla.

=== 2023 ===
November 2023

Venues: The Forum, Norwich, University of East Anglia, Norwich University of the Arts

Jury:

=== 2024 ===
November 2024

Venues: Norwich Playhouse, Norwich Cinema City, Norwich University of the Arts

Jury:

=== 2025 ===
3-16 November 2025

134 short films were screened across 19 curated screenings at Norwich Cinema City. The festival opened at Norwich Playhouse with a live-score screening of The Phantom of the Opera with accompaniment by Minima. Other events included Thelma & Louise on 35mm film, a 20th anniversary screening of Kinky Boots with a live drag performance and Q&A, and local premieres of upcoming independent features such as High Wire, Alpha and DJ Ahmet.

Venues: Norwich Playhouse, Norwich Cinema City, Norwich University of the Arts

Jury: Nat Luurtsema, Greg Sorvig, Laura Wadha, Christopher Andrews, Chris Overton, Richard Prendergast, Gabriella Marsh, Ryan Andrews, Emily Downe, Yolanda Barker, Diana Hare, Zainab Balami, Helen Piercy, Chloë Thomas, Jack Pond.

== Patrons ==
The festival has a number of patrons who support and promote the festival throughout the year. In January 2017, the festival added Julian Jarrold and Stephen Fry as new patrons. The current list includes:

- Stephen Fry
- Julian Jarrold
- Tim McInnerny
- Olivia Colman
- Brian Cox
- John Collee
- Richard Sawdon Smith

Previous patrons include the actor Bernard Hill.

== Award categories ==
The festival currently features six award categories. Winning filmmakers get a prestigious trophy, a certificate, a £1000 cash prize and software prizes. In 2020, the traditional 'Best Short Film' category was sub-divided into the new 'Best British Short Film' and 'Best International Short Film' categories.

As of 2020, the award categories are:

- Best British Short Film
- Best International Short Film
- Best Animated Film
- Best Student Film
- Best Documentary Film
- Best East Anglian Film

Year	British Short Film	International Short Film	Short Film	Animated Film	Student Film	Documentary Film	East Anglian Film	Short Screenplay	Feature Film	Audience Award
2009	-	-	Ana's Playground	O Pintor de Ceos	Heartstrings	Running to the Limits	-	-	Zig Zag Love	-
2012	-	-	Sunny Boy	This Is Not Real	Love After Sunrise	Dilli	-	-	-	-
2013	-	-	82	I Am Tom Moody	Callum	-	-	-	-	-
2014	-	-	The Hummingbird	The Gravedigger's Tale	Ultramarine	-	-	Edit Facility	-	-
2015	-	-	One-Minute Time Machine	The Bigger Picture	Rise	-	-	The Disappeared	-	Mr Plastimime
2016	-	-	A Six and Two Threes	The Present	Mary No More	The Journey of a Stateless Man	-	Fetch	-	Above The Fold
2017	-	-	Edith	To Build A Fire	Sweet Maddie Stone	Flight	The Knackerman	-	-	-
2018	-	-	The Silent Child	Two Balloons	The Gurney	Gereza	Sylvia	-	-	-
2019	-	-	3 Sleeps	Daughter	Solar Plexus	Kamali	Stalker	-	-	-
2020	My Brother Is A Mermaid	All Inclusive	-	Something Borrowed	To The Dusty Sea	The Beekeeper	Patina	-	-	-
2021	Enjoy	The Exit Plan	-	Night of the Living Dread	One For The Road	Clown	Absolution	-	-	-
2022	An Irish Goodbye	Sideral	-	Luce and the Rock	Caterpillar	Superheroes Wear Hoodies	Big Ears	-	-	-
2023	The Golden West	Salmon	-	The Brave Locomotive	Death of the Gods	The Archive: Queer Nigerians	Ceres	-	-	-
2024	Delivery	Room Taken	-	Tennis, Oranges	Fishmonger	Pipedream	A Grade Students	-	-	-
2025	A Bear Remembers	1:10	-	Two Black Boys in Paradise	Walud	Beyond The Rush	The Man That I Wave At	-	-	-
