= Lisa Goldman =

British theatre director, dramaturg, writer and author (born 1964)

- Born: November 1964 (age 61)
- Education: Drama Studio London
- Occupations: Theatre director, writer and script consultant
- Website: www.lisagoldman.co.uk

Lisa Goldman (born November 1964) is a British theatre director, dramaturg, writer and author. She was Artistic Director and joint Chief Executive of Soho Theatre (2006–10) and The Red Room Theatre Company which she founded (1995-2006). In 2008 Lisa was included in the London Evening Standard’s ‘Influentials’ list as one of the 1000 most influential people in London.

Lisa’s book The No Rules Handbook for Writers was published by Oberon Books in April 2012. It was cited by The Stage as one of their top 10 training books of 2012 and was an Amazon UK digital bestseller during November 2012.

== Early years ==
Lisa Goldman (born November 1964) grew up in Walthamstow and Chingford, east London, where she attended local state schools. She went on to gain a first class BA Hons in Drama and English from Loughborough University (1987), a postgraduate diploma in Directing from Drama Studio London (1988) and an MA in Creative and Life Writing from Goldsmiths College, London (EU/UK scholarship 2013).

Lisa started writing, devising and directing plays at university. Her final project was a physical ecofeminist piece called Mute inspired by Woman and Nature by Susan Griffin. Her graduating project from drama school in 1988 was the British premiere of Heiner Müller’s poetic trilogy, Despoiled Shore, Medeamaterial and Landscape with Argonauts. In 1994 she premiered another trilogy of Heiner Müller's work, Russian Gambit, The Duel and The Foundling.

Lisa’s first professional theatre job was directing a national tour of Twelfth Night which opened at Pleasance 2 at the Edinburgh Festival in 1988. Other early freelance work included assisting at Soho Theatre and Theatre Royal Stratford East. At Theatre Royal she also worked as a researcher for Down Every Street and was a commissioned writer on Discover my Dream and The Good Society. She was Youth Theatre Director 1988-9. Elsewhere Lisa ran playwriting workshops in schools and directed young people's plays including for Travelling Light and Inner City Theatre Company. She also wrote plays (see Writing). She spent two months recording interviews with residents in East Berlin in 1991-2 about the experience of reunification, for her play Electra in Berlin.

== Workers' Theatre Movement ==
In 1989 Lisa joined Workers' Theatre Movement (WTM) (president Ewan MacColl), and ran the company with its founder, actor Tam Dean Burn from 1989-91. She wrote and directed short plays/raps around issues such as the Poll Tax, Irish self-determination, unemployment, International Women’s Day, May Day, the first Gulf War. These were performed by the group at demos, on the street, in job centres or wherever a political intervention might be made. WTM also ran the Internationale Cabaret in Camden. For WTM Lisa directed a revival of Waiting for Lefty at the Old Red Lion in 1990 with Ed Bishop in the lead role. She also directed the Bobby Sands Trilogy in 1991 at the Tramway, Glasgow, performed by Tam Dean Burn, despite calls for the ‘IRA play’ to be banned. In 1991, during the first Gulf War, whilst running a non-stop picket outside the American Embassy, Tam and Lisa set up Artists against the War, working with a diverse group of artists to create art action on the streets against the war. In 2001 they revived this idea after the bombing of Afghanistan.

== The Red Room ==
In 1994 Lisa found a derelict room above what is now The Lion and Unicorn pub in Gaisford Street, Kentish Town and persuaded the new owner to let her create a theatre there. She was soon joined by administrators Catherine Thornborrow and Emma Schad. The Red Room Theatre Company launched in October 1995 with The Shorewatcher’s House by Judy Upton, going on to produce 12 new plays in its first year, including Sunspots and Stealing Souls by Upton, The Night Before Christmas by Anthony Neilson, Creamy by Leon London and Bacillus by Kay Adshead. The Red Room went on to have residencies at The Finborough Theatre in 1997 and Battersea Arts Centre (BAC) in 1998-9. The company also produced plays at the Bush Theatre and the Traverse Theatre, (Stitching and The Bogus Woman), Soho Theatre (Animal) and toured nationally and internationally.

The Red Room gained revenue funding in 2001 from Arts Council England after the success of The Bogus Woman by Kay Adshead. The Bogus Woman had been commissioned through Seeing Red, a Festival of Dissent at BAC involving sixteen new short plays by writers including David Eldridge, Judy Upton, Rebecca Prichard, Parv Bancil, Dona Daly, Peter Barnes, Roney Fraser Munro and Conspiracy, a situationist club and precursor of scratch nights run by Tam Dean Burn. Another of the commissioned plays, the controversial Made in England by Parv Bancil, also went on to have a successful tour.

In 2001, Lisa Goldman, Tam Dean Burn and Emma Schad set up Artists against the War when the US bombed Afghanistan after 9/11.

In 2003, on the eve of war in Iraq, Lisa curated Going Public at the Tricycle Theatre, a day-long event involving a diverse range of 30 theatre companies (including Royal Shakespeare Company and Cardboard Citizens) in a performed debate about theatre's role as a public form.

The last play Lisa directed for the Red Room was Hoxton Story in 2005 which she also wrote, based on the oral history archive she created through 40 hours of interviews with people living on the housing estates in the area. Hoxton Story was an immersive site specific critique of gentrification, involving local people and professional actors, with scenes set in and around a council flat on Arden Estate, a fake art gallery, a funeral cortege, a Hoxton Square bar and Hoxton Hall.

As well as directing plays for the Red Room, Lisa also notably commissioned and produced Anthony Neilson’s controversial plays The Censor in 1997 (Time Out Live Award; Writers Guild Best Play) which the Red Room transferred from the Finborough to the Royal Court Theatre, Duke of York's Theatre and New Ambassadors Theatre and Stitching in 2003 (Time Out Live Award, the Stage best performer Selina Boyack, a Herald Angel award and runner up Evening Standard Award).

== Soho Theatre ==
In 2006, Lisa took over as Artistic Director and joint Chief Executive of Soho Theatre Company. She introduced a strong intercultural programme, for which the company was shortlisted for a Peter Brook Empty Space Award. In 2009 Lisa was also included in the Evening Standard’s ‘Influentials’ list as one of the 1000 most influential people in London. Her new strategy for the company involved retaining a writer-centred programme whilst strongly encouraging international collaboration, cross disciplinary work, free expression and the development of diverse artists and audiences.

Notable new writing during her Soho programme (Jan 2007-May 2010) included the multi-award winning Baghdad Wedding by Hassan Abdulrazzak, the first British play about the war on Iraq to be written by an Iraqi; Everything Must Go, the first UK plays written in response to the economic crash of 2008; Orphans by Dennis Kelly, Pure Gold by Michael Bhim, Static by Dan Reballato, The Long Road by Shelagh Stevenson (co-pro Synergy), Midsummer by David Greig (co-production Traverse Theatre); Aalst and Venus as a Boy (co productions National Theatre of Scotland), White Boy by Tanika Gupta (co-production National Theatre of Scotland), An Oak Tree by Tim Crouch, Kim Noble will Die, Marisa Carnesky’s Magic War, Roaring Trade by Steve Thompson, This isn’t Romance by Insook Chappell (winner of the Verity Bargate Award 2007); A Couple of Poor Polish Speaking Romanians by Dorota Maslowska, English version by Lisa Goldman and Paul Sirett; Piranha Heights (Runner-up What's On Stage Best Production and Writers Guild Best Play) and Leaves of Glass by Philip Ridley, Moonwalking in Chinatown by Justin Young; Iya Ile by Oladipo Agboluaje (co-production Tiata Fahodzi, runner up Olivier Award); This Wide Night by Chloe Moss (winner of Susan Smith Blackburn Award); Joe Guy by Roy Williams (co-production Tiata Fahodzi); God in Ruins by Anthony Neilson (RSC) and Edward Gant’s Amazing Feats of Loneliness (Headlong); The Kitchen (Gob Squad); The Diver (co-production Setagaya Theatre, Japan with Kathryn Hunter and Hideki Noda); Fathers Inside (National Youth Theatre); Bette Bourne & Mark Ravenhill: A Life in Three Acts; Promises, Promises by Douglas Maxwell; Shraddha by Natasha Langridge Meyer-Whitworth Award; Behud by Gurpreet Kaur Bhatti runner up Index on Censorship Award; Blasted by Sarah Kane (Graeae Theatre Company); Spill Festival including Forced Entertainment's Void Story.

Lisa Goldman made the first London invitation to Belarus Free Theatre with their productions Being Harold Pinter and Generation Blue Jeans.

== Directing ==
2012 Martina Cole’s Dangerous Lady, adapted by Patrick Prior, Theatre Royal Stratford East. Nominated for two 2013 Offies

2010 Inheritance by Mike Packer, Live Theatre Company. Runner up David Hargreaves best performer The Journal Culture Awards 2010

2010 Behud by Gurpreet Kaur Bhatti, Coventry Belgrade Theatre and Soho Theatre Company. Runner up Index on Censorship Award 2010.

2009 Shraddha by Natasha Langridge, Soho Theatre Company. Meyer-Whitworth Award 2010.

2009 Everything Must Go – short pieces including by Kay Adshead, Megan Barker, Marisa Carnesky, Will Eno, Maxwell Golden, Paula Stanic, Steve Thompson, Oladipo Agboluaje.

2009 This Isn’t Romance by In-sook Chappell, Soho Theatre Company and BBC Radio 3's The Wire, Verity Bargate Award 2007

2008 Piranha Heights by Philip Ridley, Soho Theatre Company. Runner-up Whats On Stage Best Production and Writers Guild Best Play

2008 A Couple of Poor Polish Speaking Romanians by Dorota Maslowska, English version by Lisa Goldman and Paul Sirett, Soho Theatre Company.

2007 Baghdad Wedding by Hassan Abdulrazzak, Soho Theatre Company and BBC Radio 3 Sunday Play. Winner of George Devine Award and Meyer-Whitworth Award

2007 Leaves of Glass by Philip Ridley, Soho Theatre Company

2005 Hoxton Story by Lisa Goldman, The Red Room Theatre Company.

2003 Bites by Kay Adshead, Bush Theatre

2003 Produced Stitching by Anthony Neilson

2003 Going Public – a performed debate at the Tricycle Theatre about theatre as a public form involving 30 theatre companies and MC’d by Lemn Sissay

2002 Playing Fields by Neela Dolezolova, Soho Theatre Company

2002 Animal by Kay Adshead, Soho Theatre Company

2001 My Sky is Big by Rob Young, 35mm 14min film, National Film Theatre

2000 The Bogus Woman by Kay Adshead, The Traverse Theatre, The Bush Theatre, national and international tour and BBC Radio 3 Sunday Play. The Scotsman Edinburgh Festival Fringe First award 2000, Manchester Evening News Theatre Awards runner up, Susan Smith Blackburn Prize finalist;

2000 Made in England by Parv Bancil, Battersea Arts Centre, Watermans Arts Centre, Etcetera Theatre

1999 Leave to Remain by Leon London, Battersea Arts Centre

1999 Ex by Rob Young, Battersea Arts Centre Opera Festival

1998 Two month residency at the Battersea Arts Centre. Seeing Red, a festival of dissent: 30th anniversary of 1968, 1st anniversary New Labour Government. Writers included Kay Adshead, Peter Barnes, Parv Bancil, Tony Craze, Dona Daly, David Eldridge, Tanika Gupta, Roney Fraser Munro, Roddy McDevitt, Rebecca Prichard, Judy Upton.

1997 Obsession by Rob Young, Battersea Arts Centre Guinness Ingenuity Award

1997 Three month residency at the Finborough Theatre. Produced The Censor by Anthony Neilson, Touscon by Lisa Perotti. Directed People on the River by Judy Upton, Surfing by Rob Young. Guinness Ingenuity Award

1996 White Unto Harvest by Mavis Howard Guinness Ingenuity Award

1996 Sunspots by Judy Upton The Red Room Theatre Company

1996 The Body Trade by Deborah Lavin The Red Room Theatre Company

1995 The Shorewatcher's House by Judy Upton The Red Room Theatre Company

== Playwriting ==
Lisa’s produced full-length plays include Hoxton Story (2005 site specific), Discover my Dream (1991 co-writer Debbie Plentie, Theatre Royal Stratford East); The Diaries of Hannah Cullwick (1990 Writer in Residence Essex University); Flying Colours (1993 Travelling Light Tour); On the Bridge (1989 co-writer Sarah Tuck, Oval House Theatre). Plays given rehearsed readings only include The Good Society (1993) and Electra in Berlin (1995). Lisa also co-translated with Paul Sirett A Couple of Poor Polish Speaking Romanians by Dorota Maslowska which she also directed for Soho Theatre Company (2008)

== Collaborators ==
Notable actors Lisa has worked with include:

Jimmy Akingbola, Ishia Bennison, Lucy Briers, Silas Carson, Anna Carteret, Claire Louise Cordwell, Frances Cuka, Noma Dumezweni, Miranda Foster, Tristan Gravelle, Val Lilley, Jennifer Lim, John Macmillan, Kika Markham, Maxine Peake, Lara Pulver, Matt Rawle, Andrea Riseborough, John Rogan, Sirine Saba, Ruth Sheen, Andrew Tiernan, Luke Treadaway, Ben Whishaw, Jade Williams.

== Facilitation ==
Lisa has worked internationally as a facilitator, producer and researcher including in Brazil, Iran, Turkey, Japan, Norway, South Korea, US, Sweden, Finland, France, Lithuania, Poland, Denmark, Germany, Belgium, Ireland.

Lisa works as a dramaturg with writers at all stages and runs masterclasses internationally. She has taught widely and recently led MA courses at RADA, City University, Essex University and Goldsmiths, University of London. She is also a trained coach and facilitator of action learning.
