= Tiebreak Theatre =

Tiebreak Theatre was founded in 1981, in Norwich, England. It functioned as a Theatre in Education (TIE) and young people's theatre company until April 2006, when it closed after Arts Council England removed funding

The company was founded by David Farmer and Jon Oram at Norwich Arts Centre. It moved base several times, finally residing at Norwich Playhouse. The company toured schools and theatres across East Anglia, especially in its home county of Norfolk. Most of its productions were also toured across the UK to theatres, art-centres and festivals.

Tiebreak was run by an administrative team of three, employing freelance actors, writers, composers, designers and other artists to produce theatre productions and workshops for young people and their families. The company also toured internationally to Ireland, Germany and several children's festivals across western Canada and the USA.

Tiebreak received commissions from such prestigious agencies as the Natural History Museum, London, Forest Enterprise and The National Trust. The company was known for its innovative approach to a wide range of work including live music theatre, new writing commissions, participatory projects and issue-based plays. Writers included Kay Adshead, Leslie Davidoff and Neil Duffield. Most of the company's last productions were written by Artistic Director David Farmer, who left to pursue a freelance career in writing, teaching and directing. He was replaced in 2005 by Dianne Hancock until the company's closure in 2006.

== Selected Productions ==
Mouse and Mole (2005) by David Farmer, based on books by Joyce Dunbar. (The Stage review )

Frog in Love (2002) by David Farmer, based on books by Max Velthuijs. (Sunday Times Critics' Choice 2003, Time Out Critic's Choice 2003). (The Story Museum review )

The Snow Egg (2001) by Kay Adshead

Jack and the Beanstalk (2000) by David Farmer, commissioned by the Lyric Theatre (Hammersmith). (The Stage review ) (BBC Norfolk review )

Singing in the Rainforest (1989) devised by the company. Commissioned by the Natural History Museum and performed at the Unicorn Theatre, London, Vancouver International Children's Festival and Imaginate (The Scottish Children's Theatre Festival). (BBC Norfolk review ) (Galway Arts Festival 1996 brochure )
