= Judy Upton =

British playwright (born 1967)

Judy Upton (born 1967) is a British playwright.

== Life ==
She collaborated with Lisa Goldman at The Red Room Theatre Company. She also wrote radio plays for the BBC.

Ashes and Sand has been adapted into film.

== Awards ==
- 1994 George Devine Award, for Ashes and Sand

== Works ==
- Everlasting Rose, Old Red Lion Theatre, London, 1992
- Ashes And Sand, Royal Court Theatre Upstairs, London, 1994
- Bruises, Royal Court Theatre Upstairs, London, 1995
- The Shorewatchers' House, The Red Room Theatre (first production), London, 1995
- Temple, Orange Tree, Richmond, 1995
- Stealing Souls, The Red Room Theatre, London, 1996
- Sunspots, The Red Room Theatre, London, 1996
- People On The River, The Red Room at the Finborough, London, 1997
- To Blusher With Love, The Man In The Moon/Worthing Ritz, 1997
- Confidence, Birmingham Rep, Birmingham, 1998
- The Girlz, Orange Tree, Richmond, 1998
- Know Your Rights, The Red Room at Battersea Arts Centre, 1998
- Pig In The Middle, Y Touring Theatre Company, Schools tour and the House of Commons, 1998
- The Ballad Of A Thin Man, Channel Theatre Company Spring Tour, 2000
- Hotmail From Helsinki, Vienna English Theatre, 2001
- Sliding With Suzanne, Royal Court Theatre Upstairs, London, 2001
- Team Spirit, Theatre Royal, Plymouth, 2002
- My Imprisoned Heart, short film, 2007
- Noctropia, Hampstead Theatre, London, 2009

== Bibliography ==
- Judy Upton Plays, Methuen Drama (24 Jan 2002), ISBN 978-0-413-77020-2
- "Everlasting Rose" in Best of the Fest, Aurora Metro Books (6 June 1998), ISBN 978-0951587782
