= Leo Asemota =

Nigerian artist

Leo Asemota (born 1967 in Edo State, Nigeria) is a contemporary artist living and working in London, England. Asemota employs photography, film and video, performance, sculpture, drawings and various progressions in his work.

== Work ==
Spoonman (1999) a film about reality principles explored through the life of a heroin dependent was Asemota's first work. FiTH WORK (born 1999) is an ongoing series with which he evolves a language for his ideas. FiTH is an acronym coined in 1999 by him meaning fever in the head. The works from the series are unique not only in form and approach but also because there are no multiples.

"Rare and signed copy of the Camden publication"

One of his best known works is the year-long photographic study Map of a City (2001). Asemota started the project on January 1, 2001, travelling indiscriminately across London City in search of the site-specific Witness Appeal boards installed by the city's Police Force in an appeal for witnesses to numerous crimes. Images from the study were published in a controversial limited edition booklet by London Borough of Camden and featured in the premiere issue of the arts journal Magnet, which was published by Institute of International Visual Arts(inIVA) and launched at Venice Biennale in 2001. "Map of a City" was presented at Justina Barnicke Gallery Toronto Canada in the group exhibition "28 Days: Reimagining Black History Month" curated by Pamela Edmonds and Sally Frater.

On invitation from Lisa Goldman, artistic director of award-winning theatre company The Red Room, Asemota created video installations and a portfolio of photographic portraits of Hoxton residents for the site-specific production Hoxton Story which opened at Hoxton Hall, to sold-out performances on September 10, 2005.

Also in 2005, Asemota began The Ens Project (2005–2019) an art work informed by the Edo people of Benin's annual Igue festival, the infamous British sacking and subsequently, looting of the Kingdom of Benin during the 1897 Benin Expedition and the essay The Work of Art in the Age of Mechanical Reproduction by the German cultural theorist Walter Benjamin. The first three years of the project was presented in the survey Leo Asemota: The Ens Project's First Principles at New Art Exchange in 2011. A new artwork The Intrinsic Tendency of The Ens Sign was commissioned for the Sharjah Biennial 14.

In 2017, Asemota participated in documenta 14 Radio Program from June 17 – July 7, 2017. His show Intermission Transmission Temporal were a diverse series of broadcasts with content that was composed from day to day.

A neon light installation, music dictionaries, works on paper and performances make up Asemota's Workbook for Exploring the Sonic Cosmologies of Halim El-Dabh (2018–21) for the research, exhibition and publication project on Egyptian composer, scholar and teacher Halim El-Dabh The exhibitions "Canine Wisdom for The Barking Dog - The Dog Done Gone Deaf: Exploring The Sonic Cosmologies of Halim El-Dabh" (2018) was held in Dakar, Senegal during 13th edition of Dakar Biennale 2018, and "HERE HISTORY BEGAN.Tracing the Re/Verberations of Halim El-Dabh" (2021) at SAVVY Contemporary Berlin. The project was organized by SAVVY Contemporary Berlin and curated by Cameroonian curator Bonaventure Soh Bejeng Ndikung, Egyptian curator Kamila Metwaly and Senegalese curator Marie Hélène Pereira.

Asemota's collaborative exhibition #215 with Angolan artist Nastio Mosquito was held at Portikus Frankfurt in 2018. The exhibition was based on the conversations between the two artists since their first meeting during documenta 14 Radio Program in 2017 and featured works they developed specifically for Portikus. The exhibition opening hours were from sunrise to sunset.

Findings Through Principles of Phrenology, Literature, Sound and Advertising was Asemota's contribution to the exhibition "Ultrasanity: On Madness, Psychiatry and Resistance" held at ifa-Galerie Berlin in 2019. One of the works in the exhibition was (ultrasanity anecdotes sound fractions) an artwork album of songs on the subject of madness. Asemota and Cameroonian curator Bonaventure Soh Bejeng Ndikung compiled the songs.

For the 12th edition of Sonsbeek 20→24 the International Contemporary Art Exhibition in Arnhem, the Netherlands "Force Times Distance: On Labour and its Sonic Ecologies", Asemota presented The Sonsbeek Suite (As The Distance Travelled By The Force Acting Is To The Distance Travelled By The Resistance), a commissioned project in three permutations: ‘how-hard-and-how-far-and-how-long’ at Walter Books; ‘how-far-and-how-long-and-how-hard’; and ‘how-long-and-how-hard-and-how-far’ at the Kröller-Müller Museum. "The Sonsbeek Suite" culminated from Asemota's interest in ant colonies, time as well as a history of labour.
