= Rob Young (playwright) =

British playwright and screenwriter

Rob Young is a British playwright, screenwriter, and artist. His film credits include Miranda (2002).

== Early life ==
Young was born in North East England.

== Film ==
- Miranda (2002) – writer

== Theatre ==
- The Man with the Absurdly Large Penis, Young Vic, London
- Ex, Soho Theatre, London
- Crush, Bath Fringe Festival, Bath

== See also ==
- Lisa Goldman
