= Hoxton Story =

Hoxton Story is an epic and poetic multi-plot fable marking the 10th anniversary of the multi-award-winning theatre company The Red Room.

== Inspiration ==
Hoxton, England, became notable in the 1990s as a groovy district of loft apartments and the stomping ground for artists that came to be collectively known as the yba's – Young British Artists. The area also needed urban regeneration, and the government promised an influx of funding to improve housing and social amenities.

Artistic Director Lisa Goldman and her team spent periods between 2004 and 2005 interviewing residents of Hoxton housing estates to find out just what has changed for them. Their answers and perspectives form the basis of the production of Hoxton Story. Goldman also took inspiration from the relationship between William Shakespeare and the Hoxton area. Shakespeare was once a Hoxton resident and most of the houses in the surrounding estates are named after characters in his plays; the sub-plot of Hoxton Story is loosely based on Romeo and Juliet.

== The production ==
Hoxton Story was a site-specific walkabout performance through a regenerated London community, presenting a visual and aural montage of facts, fictions and verbatim testimony culminating in sound and video installations around Hoxton, an interactive website, on-the-street performances, a book and an interview archive.

Besides writer and director Lisa Goldman, the team included set designer Jon Bausor, contemporary artist Leo Asemota, lighting designer Jenny Kagan, sound designer Kate Tierney and digital artists Elvina Flower and James Smith. Performers from Hackney's Young People's Theatre worked alongside a group of actors that included Tam Dean Burn. The Producer was Tim Jones of Solar Associates.

Hoxton Story opened on 10 September 2005 at Hoxton Hall to sold-out performances.

== Hoxton Story: the book ==
A book, also titled Hoxton Story, was published to accompany the production. The book contained extracts from in depth interviews conducted by The Red Room team with twenty-five Hoxton residents that included squatters, council workers, community activists and artists. The interviews explores their dreams, disappointments and achievements in relation to the land and environment of Hoxton, as home, work and recreation; as public space and as capital waiting to be realized. The book also features a newly commissioned portfolio of portraits by Leo Asemota of the residents that were interviewed.
