= Hoxton Hall =

Community centre in Hackney, London

- Mortimer's Hall; Hoxton Hall Dancing Academy; MacDonald's Music hall Blue Ribbon Gospel Temperance Mission
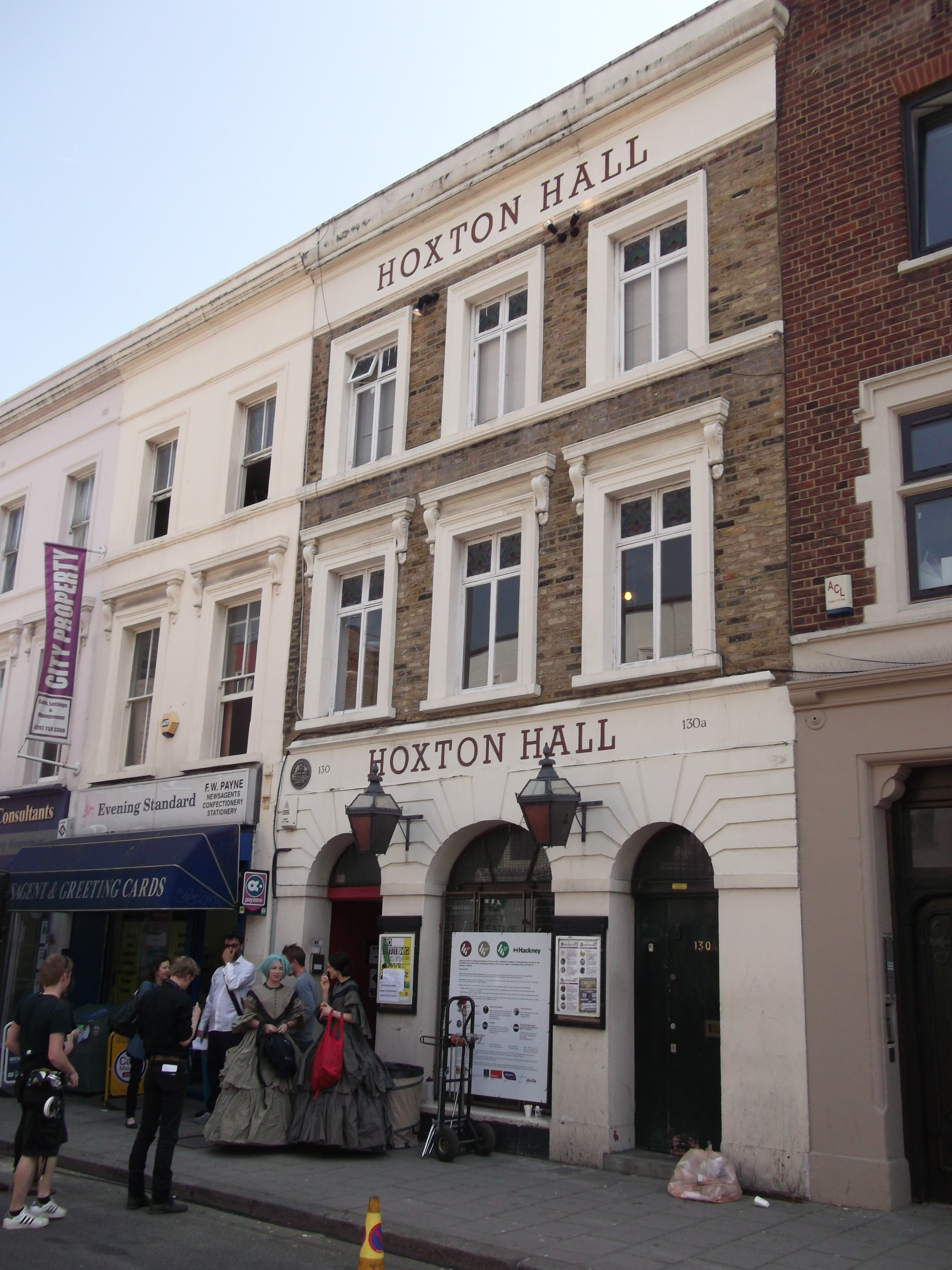
- Hoxton Hall
- Interactive map of Hoxton Hall
- Address: 130 Hoxton Street; London, N1; United Kingdom
- Coordinates: 51.5318°N 0.0802°W
- Owner: Hoxton Hall - Registered Charity
- Capacity: 290
- Designation: Grade II*
- Current use: Performance arts theatre
- Public transit: Hoxton

Construction
- Opened: 1863
- Years active: 1863–present
- Architect: James Mortimer

Website
- hoxtonhall.co.uk

Hoxton Hall is a performance arts theatre and community centre in the Hoxton area of Shoreditch, at 130 Hoxton Street, in the London Borough of Hackney.

== History ==
A grade II* listed building, the theatre was first built as a music hall in 1863, as MacDonald's Music Hall. It is an unrestored example of the saloon style. In the theatre, an iron-railed, two tier galleried auditorium rises on three sides, supported on cast iron columns above a small, high, multi-tiered stage. It survives largely in its original form, as for many years it was used as a Quaker meeting house.

The music hall lost its performance licence in 1871 due to complaints by the police; it was sold, and the new owners applied for a licence in 1876, but were again rejected. William Isaac Palmer (1824–1893) purchased it on behalf of the Blue Ribbon Gospel Temperance Mission in 1879. Palmer was an heir to the Huntley and Palmer biscuit family and spent much of his fortune on charity. On Palmer's death, the hall passed to the Bedford Institute, a Quaker organisation dedicated to running adult schools and alleviating the effects of poverty.

Today, the hall is used as a community centre and performance space.

== Notable recent performances ==
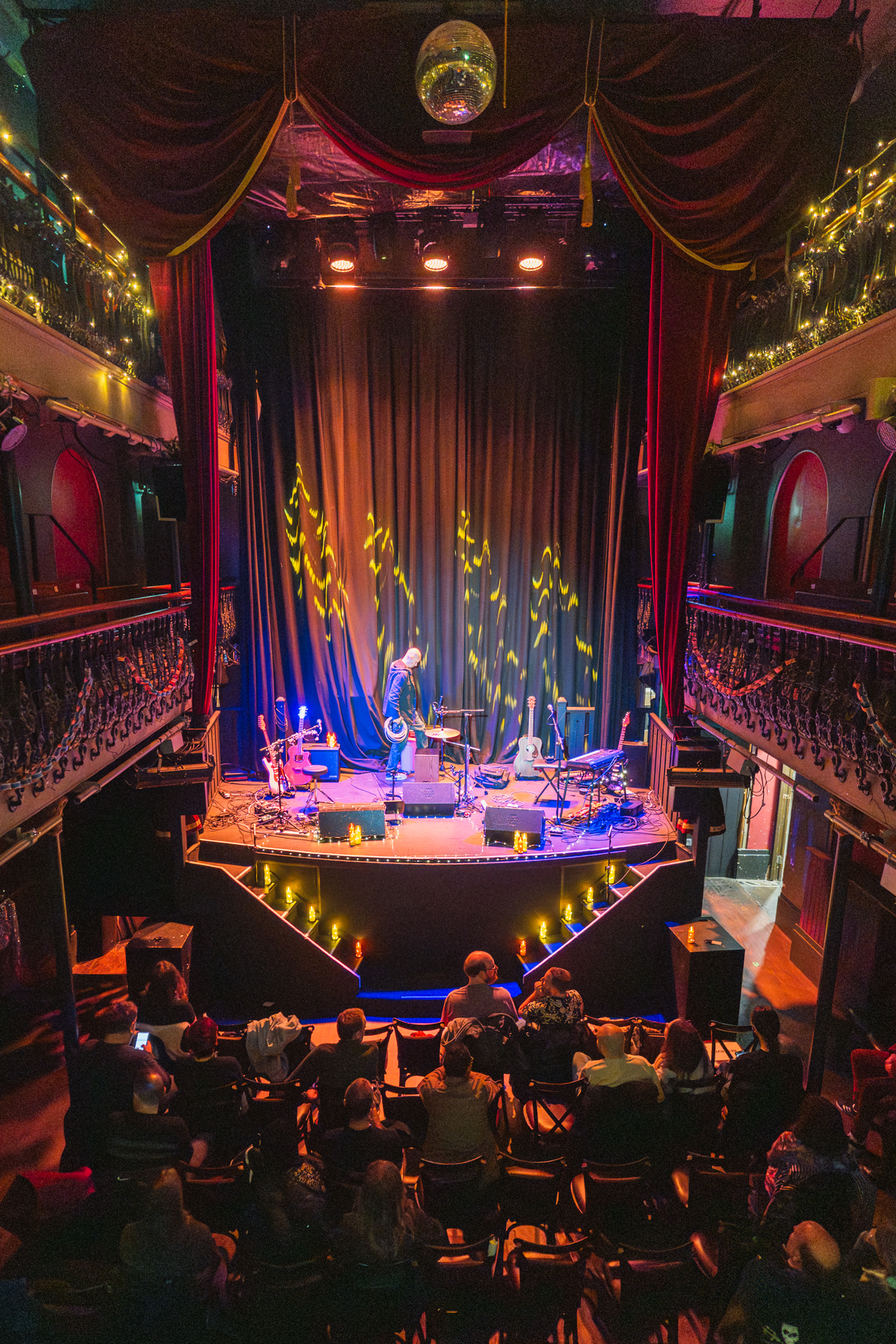
Performance in Hoxton Hall, December 2025.

- On invitation from Lisa Goldman, artistic director of the theatre company The Red Room, Leo Asemota created video installations and a portfolio of photographic portraits of Hoxton residents for the site-specific production Hoxton Story which opened at Hoxton Hall, to performances on 10 September 2005
- Robert Newman filmed a television programme entitled A History of Oil for More4 at Hoxton Hall. The show is a mixture of stand-up comedy and an introductory lecture on geopolitics and peak oil. Based on his touring show, Apocalypso Now, Newman argues that twentieth-century Western foreign policy, including World War I, should be seen as a continuous struggle by the West to control Middle Eastern oil.
- Welsh singer Duffy performed an intimate gig in July 2026, with only 50 fans in attendance, alongside friends and family.
