= Broken Circle/Spiral Hill =

Earthwork sculpture by Robert Smithson

Coordinates: 52°48′33″N 6°55′43″E

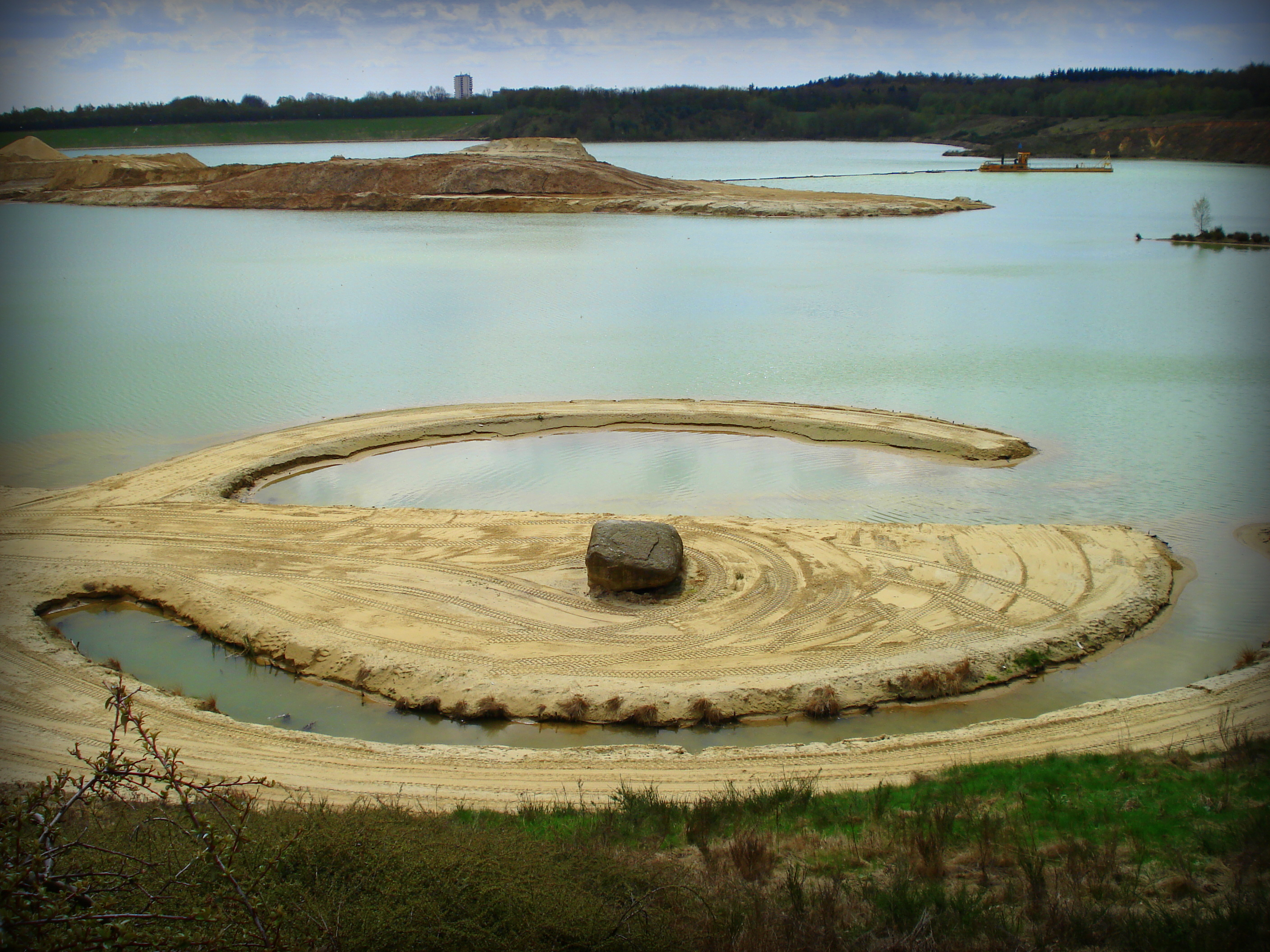
- Robert Smithson's Broken Circle in 2006
- Artist: Robert Smithson
- Year: 1971
- Type: Earthwork sculpture
- Medium: white and yellow sand, earth, black topsoil
- Dimensions: Broken Circle: 140 ft/43 m; Spiral Hill: 75 ft/23 m ft diameter
- Location: Emmen, Netherlands

Broken Circle/Spiral Hill is an earthwork sculpture by the American artist Robert Smithson. It was created for the 1971 Sonsbeek outdoor sculpture exhibition. The piece is located in Emmen, Netherlands.

== Description ==
Broken Circle/Spiral Hill is the sole large-scale earthwork piece created by Robert Smithson outside of the United States. It is located in a former sand mine cut into the side of a terminal moraine, located just outside of Emmen in the province of Drenthe, The Netherlands.

The geological and industrial history of the Drenthe region drew Smithson to Emmen. He was fascinated by the constructed landscape of The Netherlands. Smithson was both interested in landscapes that suggested prehistory committed to working with landscapes scarred by industry.

The approximately 140 foot (43 m) diameter Broken Circle earthwork consists of a jetty and canal; it was constructed of white and yellow sand on the bank of a quarry lake 10-to-15 (3 - 4.5 m) feet deep. The interior canal is approximately 12 feet (3.7 m) wide. The accompanying earthwork, Spiral Hill, is approximately 75 feet (23 m) in diameter at the base, and is constructed from earth, black topsoil, and white sand.

Smithson conceived of the two forms as the "section in the water is a centrifugal image; the path of its earthbound companion is centripetal." Gary Shapiro, in his book, Earthwards: Robert Smithson and Art after Babel, writes that the two elements had a "decentering" effect. The complexity of the site also informed the sculptural elements, referencing both the industrial use of the site, as well as the topography of the Netherlands' "artificial land". Smithson also mentioned that he was inspired by the 1953 flooding disaster in the Netherlands, and the vicinity of stone-age dolmen (hunebedden) near the artwork.

Smithson wrote of the glacial erratic boulder in the center of Broken Circle as an "accidental center":. In 2022 the audio documentary "The Unwanted Boulder", narrated by Lee Ranaldo, explored this idea further. Smithson explained:

I was haunted by the shadowy lump in the middle of my work. Like the eye of a hurricane, it seemed to suggest all kinds of misfortunes...The perimeter of the intrusion magnified into a blind spot in my mind that blotted the circumference out...When I return to Holland, I might bury the boulder in the center, or move it outside of the circumference, or just leave it there...a warning from the Ice Age. (Writings, pg. 182)

Smithson conceived of the Spiral Hill as a kind of viewing platform for Broken Circle and for the surrounding "broken landscapes" consisting of pasture lands and mining operations. Broken Circle/Spiral Hill was Smithson's first land reclamation project, where an industrial site was "reclaimed" as a work of art. Smithson described this as “a major piece” and it sparked his interest in working with industry and post-industrial landscape to make art “a necessary part of their reclamation projects.”

Working with the artist Nancy Holt, Smithson intended to create a film as an integral part of Broken Circle/Spiral Hill. In 1971 Smithson created a series of storyboards and Holt filmed on 16mm stock. The intention was to interweave material documenting the North Sea flood of 1953 that overwhelmed the sea defenses of The Netherlands and Belgium. Smithson died before the film was completed. In 2011, on the fortieth anniversary of Broken Circle/Spiral Hill the organization SKOR | Foundation for Art and Public Domain invited Holt to the complete the film and she created the moving image work "Breaking Ground: Broken Circle/Spiral Hil l."

Broken Circle/Spiral Hill was commissioned by the periodical outdoor sculpture exhibition Sonsbeek, initially as a temporary public work of art, however Smithson was clear he wished the work to remain in place, describing it as a "major piece." In a letter to the Dutch curator Wim Beeren he wrote: “This is a major work, I want to have good reproductions in magazines. I want the piece to remain forever. Please help!”

== Site and realisation ==
=== Sonsbeek ===
Smithson was asked to realise a work in the Netherlands for the 1971 Sonsbeek exhibition. This art festival was held at an irregular schedule in and around the Sonsbeek park in Arnhem. For the 1971 edition Wim Beeren, curator at the Stedelijk Museum in Amsterdam, was asked to be the exhibition curator. He decided to build the exhibition to center around the theme Buiten de perken ("Out of bounds"), and locate many of the pieces around the Netherlands instead of only focusing on the Sonsbeek park in Arnhem.

The site of the Smithson piece in Emmen is around 150 kilometres (93 miles) to the northeast of Arnhem.

=== Location ===
Looking for a proper location for the work, Smithson got in contact with Sjouke Zijlstra, a social geographer and head of centre for the arts in Emmen. He suggested a sand quarry in Emmerschans, a neighbourhood northeast of the Emmen city center, noting its mineral-laden green water. This quarry was owned by the local De Boer family, run under the name Zand- en Exploitatiemaatschappij Emmen B.V. ("Sand and Exploitation Company Emmen Inc."). The company is currently owned by Gerard de Boer, who was six years old when the Smithson project was realised. The De Boer family worked together with Smithson to realise the project.

=== Preparatory drawings ===
During 1970 and 71, Smithson made a series of preparatory concept and working drawing for Emmen that brought to light his interest in entropy. The preparatory drawing Broken Circle, Emmen, Holland, 1971 notes that the "view point" is Spiral Hill, as well as a notation to move the boulder outside of the circle. Also noted on several of Smithson's preparatory drawings for Broken Circle, including those for the film treatment, that the diameter is approximately 43 metres (140 ft). The art historian, Eugenie Tsai has written that Smithson's drawings for Broken Circle/Spiral Hill and Spiral Jetty informed his plans for "ground systems" earthworks for the Dallas-Fort Worth airport, a project that was never realized.

The preparatory drawing Spiral Hill, Emmen, Holland 1971, notes that Smithson originally wanted to build the hill out of peat blocks.

According to the book, Robert Smithson: Retrospective, one of Smithson's first concepts for the Emmen sand quarry was an unrealized earthwork Meandering Canal, Emmen, Holland 1971. The pencil drawing shows a winding canal with four meandering "oxbows" and four hill mounds. He also created a drawing from this time, Peat Bog Sprawl, Emmen Holland, 1971, depicting over 30 huge blocks of peat, 8 ft. by 3 ft. by 4 ft. each.

== Maintenance and future ==
After the construction of the site there was talk of the piece becoming permanent instead of just temporary for the Sonsbeek exhibition. Smithson left correspondence indicating that artwork was "a gift to the Netherlands or the Dutch people", but details on maintenance and who should be responsible for the maintenance of the work were lacking. The De Boer family, who owned the site and realised the work together with Smithson, did allow for visits and excursions of the otherwise private site, which was still an active sand quarry as well.

In 1972 the work already showed signs of disrepair, due to erosion. The municipality of Emmen planted vegetation to keep the work from deteriorating.

On the 40th anniversary of the work a short documentary on the realisation of the work was released. The documentary contains footage shot by Nancy Holt, Smithson's widow, during the 1971 construction of the piece. Aerial shots were included in the documentary.

In 2019 the site was sold from the De Boer family to a new owner. The last time the site was open to the public was in 2021, celebrating the 50th anniversary of the work.

== Gallery ==
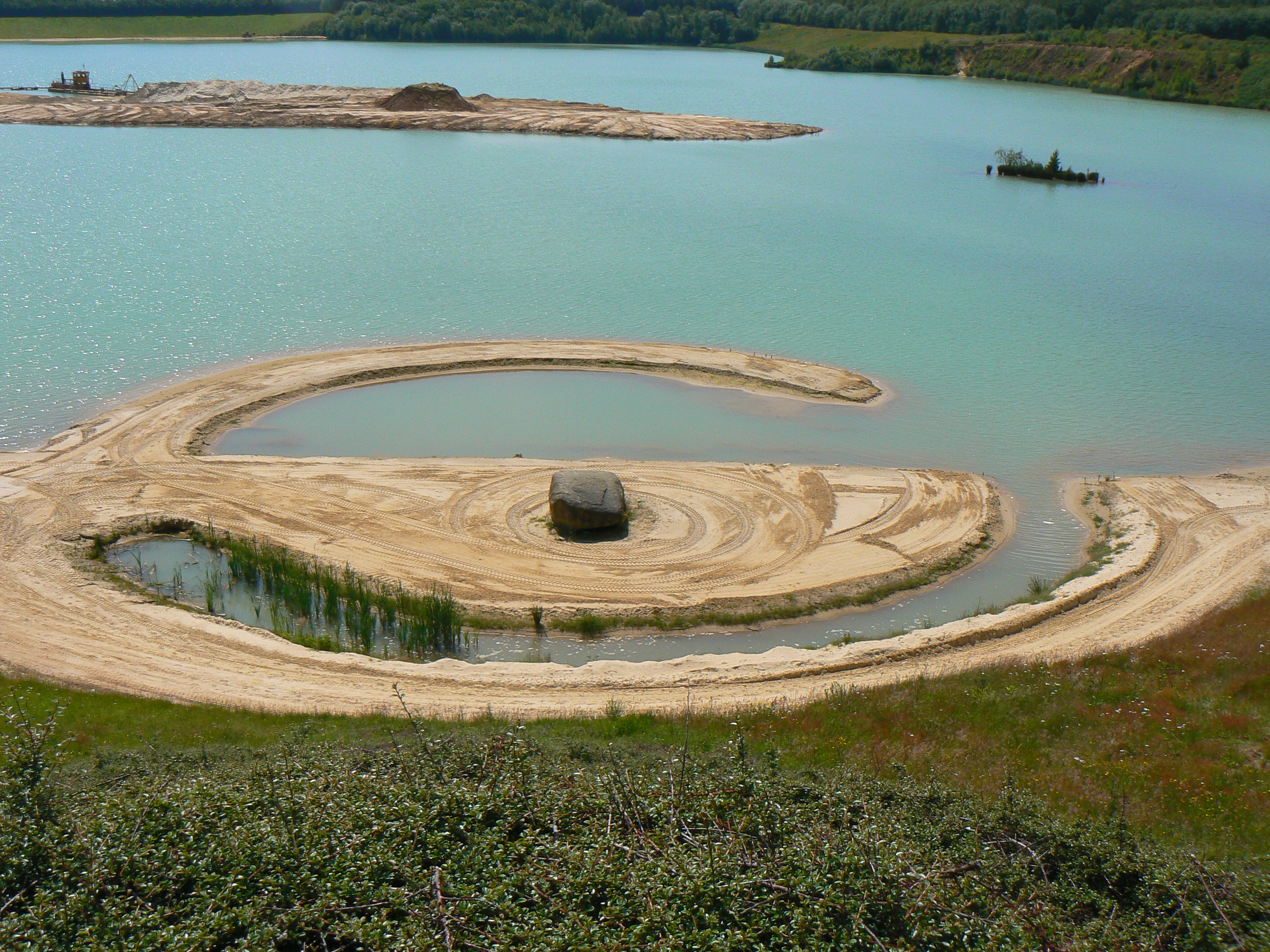
Broken Circle in 2009 showing vegetation in canal

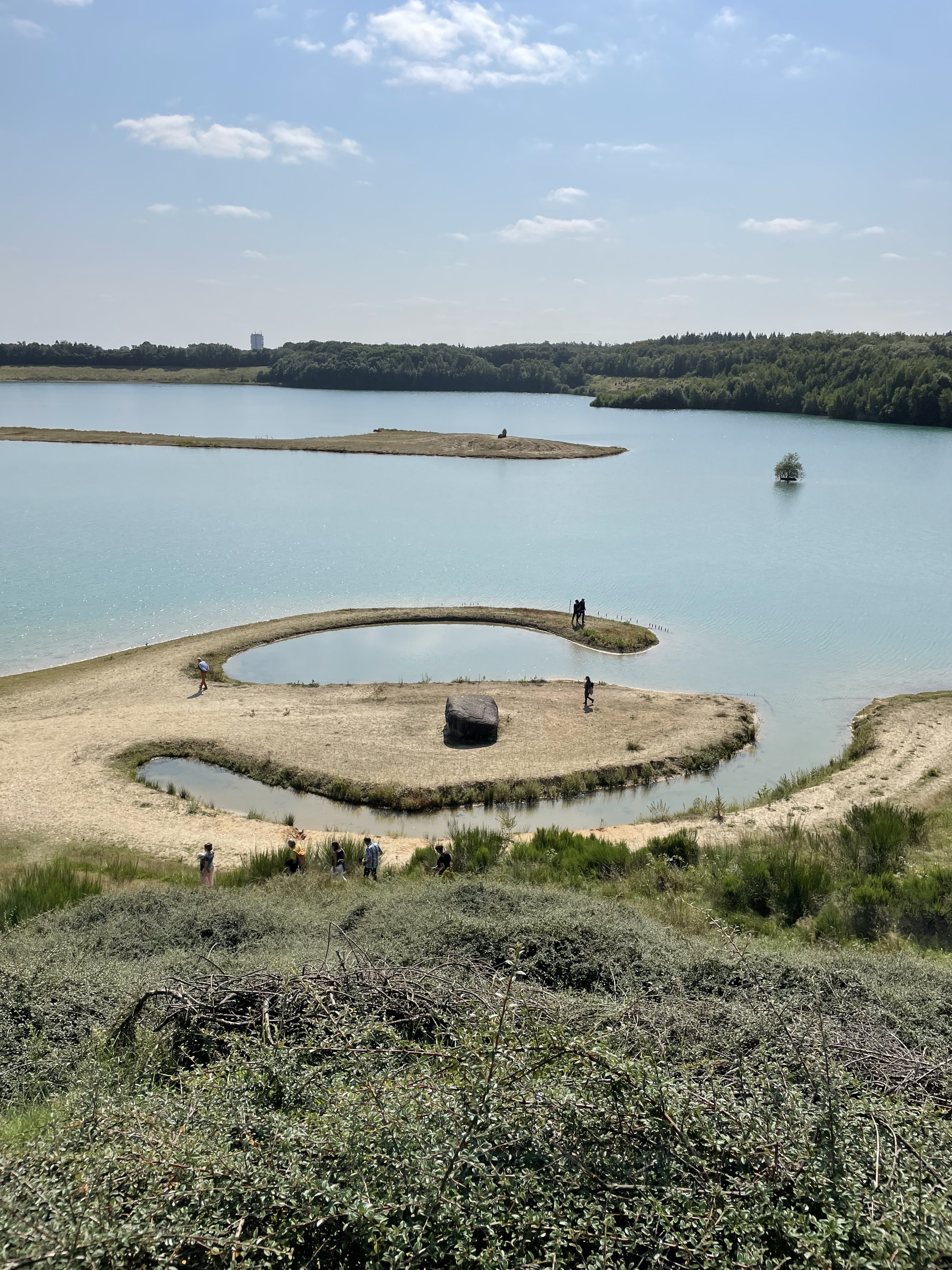
Broken Circle from Spiral Hill in 2021 showing shoreline erosion and vegetation

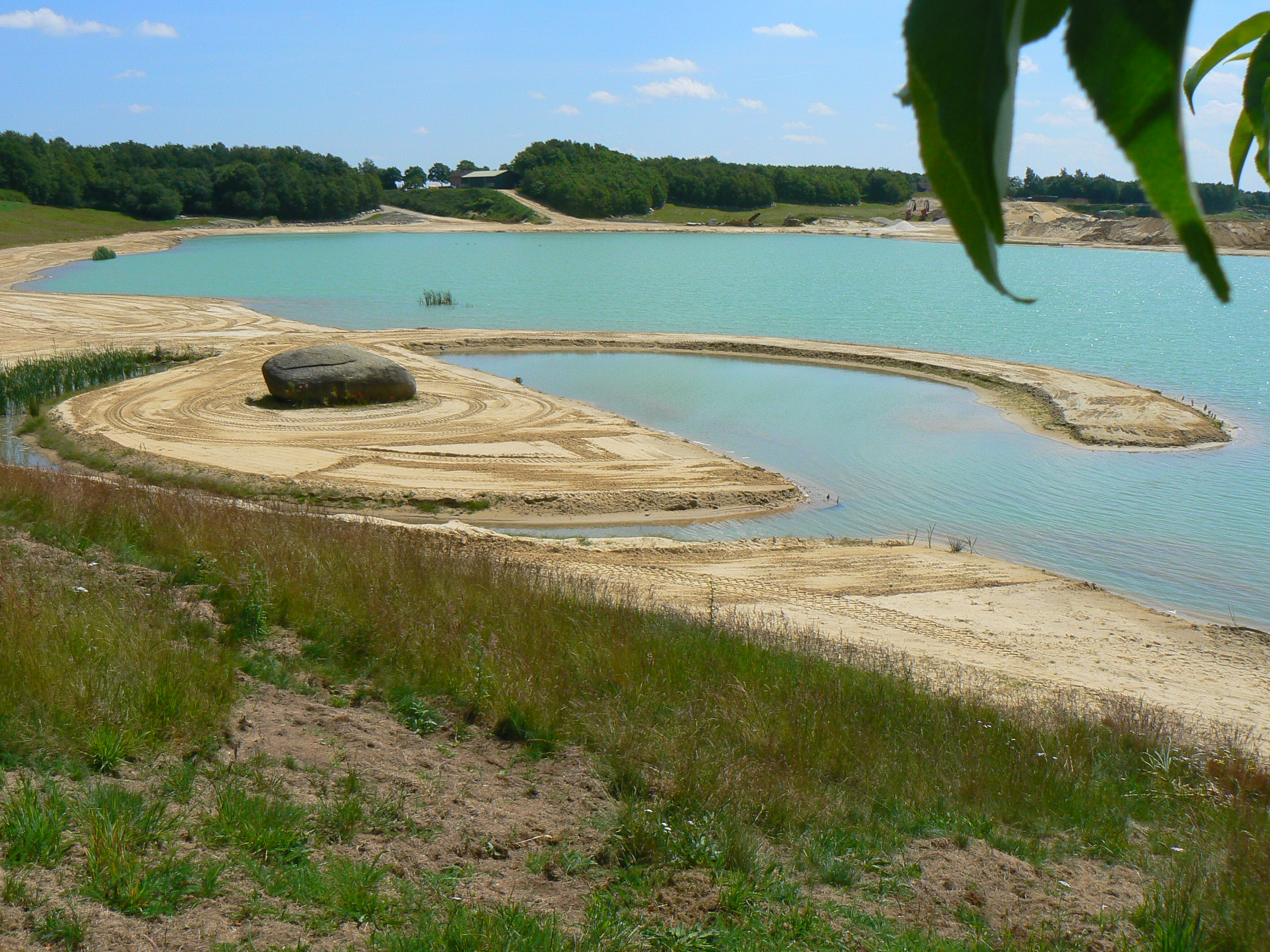
Detail of shoreline erosion, and glacial boulder, 2009

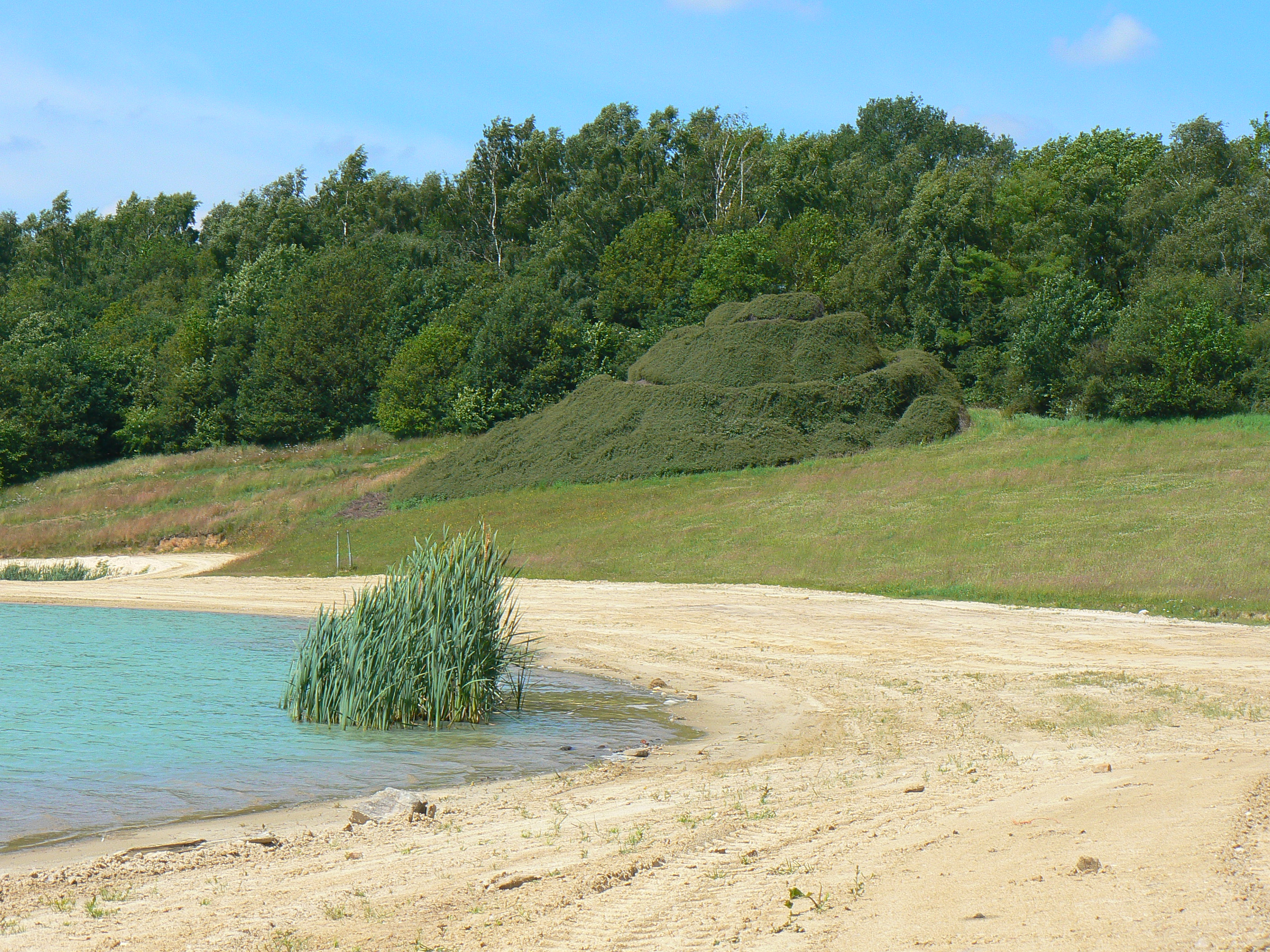
Yellow sand detail of Broken Circle, Spiral Hill in background, 2009

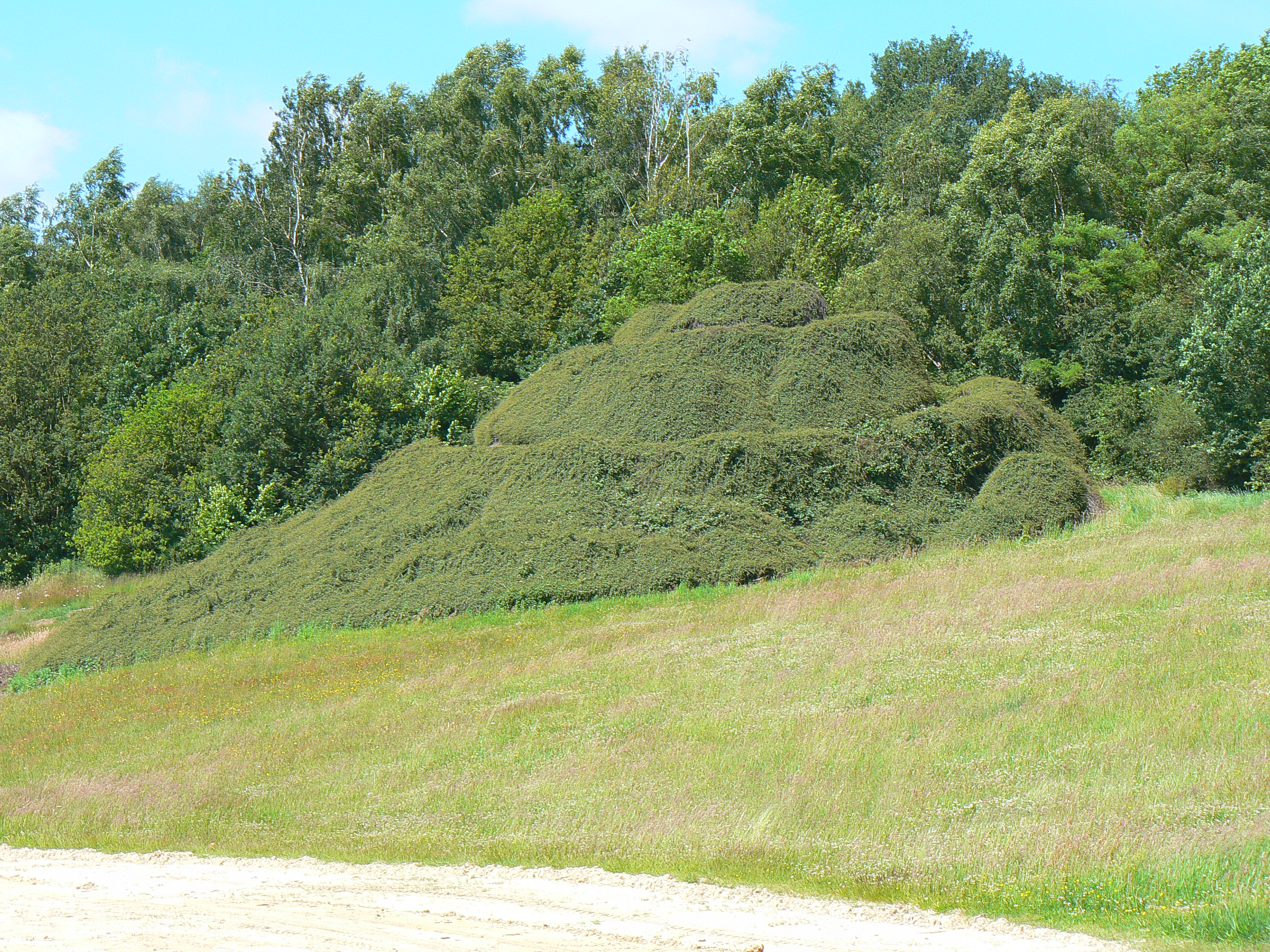
Spiral Hill in 2009 covered with vegetation

== See also ==
- Spiral Jetty
