= Miranda (2002 film) =

- DVD cover
- Directed by: Marc Munden
- Written by: Rob Young
- Produced by: Laurence Bowen
- Starring: Christina Ricci; Kyle MacLachlan; John Simm; John Hurt
- Cinematography: Ben Davis
- Edited by: William Diver
- Music by: Murray Gold
- Production companies: FilmFour; UK Film Council; Senator Film; Feel Good Films
- Distributed by: Pathé Distribution; FilmFour Distributors; Senator Filmverleih
- Release date: 18 January 2002 (Sundance Film Festival)
- Running time: 93 minutes
- Country: United Kingdom
- Language: English

Miranda is a 2002 British comedy film starring Christina Ricci, Kyle MacLachlan, John Simm, John Hurt, Tamsin Greig and Julian Rhind-Tutt. The film is classified as a romance/thriller by IMDb.

== Plot ==
Frank (Simm), a librarian in the United Kingdom, falls in love with a mysterious American dancer named Miranda (Ricci). Frank appears naive, but his character is as complex as Miranda's. Graphic scenes of sex and seduction illustrate Frank's fantasy and unrealistic love for Miranda. She suddenly disappears, and he tracks her down in London, discovering she is actually a con artist. He is kidnapped by one of Nailor's goons and dumped into the luggage compartment of a long-distance coach heading to Northern England. He manages to escape at traffic lights and rejoins Miranda asking her to say The Three Words to him. She responds with Fuck Off Now.

Miranda and her boss (Hurt), who not so secretly "loves" her, are in business selling buildings that they don't own to unwitting customers. These buildings are really being prepared for demolition. In one scene in which Miranda is negotiating the sale of a warehouse with Nailor (MacLachlan), Nailor sees men putting down cable around the building. He asked Miranda what were they doing and she replies that they are putting in cable TV when, in fact, they are preparing the warehouse for demolition. After making a big score, by successfully conning Nailor to buy the warehouse, her boss leaves her, and Nailor seeks revenge against Miranda.

Frank realizes that he should not have left her, and returns to London, with a very quirky friend who is instrumental in saving Miranda from Nailor's knife-wielding goon. While Frank's friend distracts Nailor with fancy jiu-jitsu moves, Frank slams a breadboard over Nailor's head. The film ends in comic relief with Frank and Miranda living the good life off Miranda's ill-gotten gains at her cottage.

== Cast ==
- Christina Ricci
- John Simm
- Kyle MacLachlan
- John Hurt
- Julian Rhind-Tutt
- Matthew Marsh
- Pik Sen Lim
- Joanne Froggatt
- Cavan Clerkin
- Tamsin Greig
- Ryozo Kohira
- Dennis Matsuki
- Carol Sua

== Filming locations ==
Filmed on location in London and Scarborough.

== Critical reception ==
On review aggregator Rotten Tomatoes, the film holds an approval rating of 44% based on 9 reviews. BBC Movies review labelled the film as a "limp, homegrown romantic comedy" and "a soul-sapping stinker'. The Radio Times listed the film as being a Comedy-Romance "but featuring little of either" and describing the film as a "dull British embarrassment" with "one of Christina Ricci's worst performances to date".
