= Wuthering Heights (1978 TV serial) =

British TV adaptation of the novel "Wuthering Heights" by Emily Brontë

- Based on: Wuthering Heights by Emily Brontë
- Written by: Hugh Leonard; David Snodin
- Directed by: Peter Hammond
- Starring: Ken Hutchison; Kay Adshead
- Composer: Carl Davis
- Country of origin: United Kingdom
- Original language: English
- No. of seasons: 1
- No. of episodes: 5

Production
- Producer: Jonathan Powell
- Running time: 60 minutes (per episode)

Original release
- Network: BBC Two
- Release: 24 September – 22 October 1978

Wuthering Heights is a 1978 British TV adaptation of Emily Brontë's 1847 novel Wuthering Heights, starring Ken Hutchison, Kay Adshead, Pat Heywood, and John Duttine, originally broadcast on BBC Two as a 5-part miniseries, beginning 24 September 1978. Location filming took place on the Yorkshire Moors Broad Head Lane, Oakworth, Keighley, West Yorkshire. This BBC version is regarded as being the one most faithful to the original novel because it does not end with Cathy's death but continues into the next generation, with Heathcliff seeking revenge against those he felt had wronged him.

== Cast ==
- Ken Hutchison as Heathcliff
  - Dale Tarry as Heathcliff (as child)
- Kay Adshead as Cathy Earnshaw
  - Maria Swailes as Cathy (as child)
- Brian Wilde as Joseph
- Pat Heywood as Ellen Dean
- John Duttine as Hindley
  - Mitchell Varnam as Hindley (as child)
- Maggie Wilkinson as Frances
- Dennis Burgess as Mr Linton
- Wendy Williams as Mrs Linton
- Richard Kay as Lockwood
- John Collin as Mr Earnshaw
- Patricia Healey as Mrs Earnshaw
- Judith Byfield as Servant Girl
- John Golightly as Dr Kenneth
- David Robb as Edgar
  - Grant Bardsley as Edgar (as child)
- Paul Dawkins as Reverend Graham
- Caroline Langrishe as Isabella
  - Julia Stark as Isabella (as child)
- Norman Rutherford as Mr Green
- Barbara Keogh as Zillah
- Cathryn Harrison as Catherine Linton
- David Wilkinson as Hareton
  - Elliot Moss and Simon Massey as Hareton (as child)
- Andrew Burleigh as Linton
- Kate David as Mary
- Barry Hart as Robert
- Charles Turner as Sexton
- Richard Usher as Small Boy

== Critical reception ==
Allmovie wrote, "Irish playwright Hugh Leonard handles the adaptation, deftly juggling the many characters and subplots without the slightest sense of strain"; and the BFI described the adaptation as "embracing the hysteria and savagery of its source novel." However, in a contemporary review Clive James called it the "latest but not the best of the Beeb's long line of classic serials", and "the blithering pits".
