= Norwich Cinema City =

Cultural cinema in Norwich, Norfolk, England

Coordinates: 52.630501°N 1.295918°E

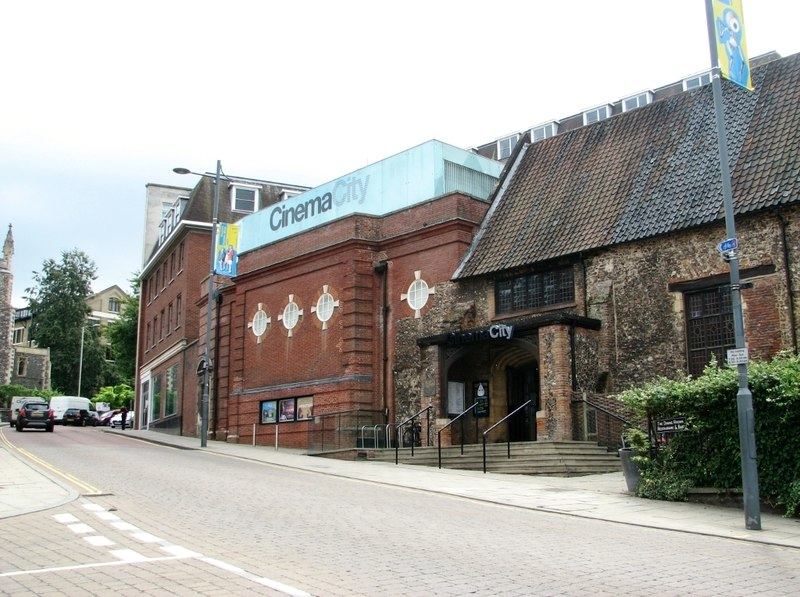
Cinema City

Cinema City is a Grade I listed cultural cinema in the city of Norwich in Norfolk, England. The building is owned by Norwich City Council and the site is managed by the charity Cinema City Ltd (changed name from Norfolk and Norwich Film Theatre Ltd in August 2014), charity number 288309. Commercial activities - film screenings, bar and restaurant - are carried out by Picturehouse Cinemas Limited which operates a national chain of 'art house' cinemas, called Picturehouse. Picturehouse is part of the Cineworld chain. Cinema City Ltd (the charity) undertakes education activities on site and throughout Norfolk through its education arm Cinema Plus.

== History ==
The cinema occupies Suckling House, a partly medieval merchant's house in St Andrews Street, named after the Suckling family who owned it in the sixteenth century. The oldest surviving parts of the building are from the early fourteenth century. The front of the house in St Andrew's Hill dates from an eighteenth-century renovation. A brick building, known as Stuart Hall, was added on the east side in 1925.

Suckling Hall was last used as a residence in 1915. It was bought by the Norfolk News Company in 1916 who made some repairs before selling it to Ethel Mary and Helen Caroline Colman in 1923. They restored it and added Stuart Hall, intended as a public hall with a capacity of around 450 people fitted with a cinema projector and screen. In 1925 they presented Suckling House and the new hall to the City of Norwich to be used for "the advancement of education in its widest and most comprehensive sense".

Cinema City first opened at Suckling Hall in April 1978 as a cinema seating 230. Renovations took place in 1981 including a new projection box, stairs and box office. The Great Hall became a bar and the vaulted bay nearest the hall was turned into a kitchen.

== The present cinema ==
The cinema moved temporarily to the Norwich Playhouse in 2004 while its original premises were rebuilt as a three-screen cinema, which reopened in 2007. Redevelopment works were in large part funded by an Arts Council grant in excess of £3m.

Screen One, with just under 200 seats, is on the first floor, equipped with both digital and 35mm projectors. Screen Two has just under 100 seats, and Screen Three just over 60. A couple of metres were dug down to create space for the new auditoria, which have their screens backing onto St Andrews Street. There is a new lobby at this level, in a 17th-century panelled room. The courtyard provides a pleasant area for eating and drinking, and the adjacent 14th century vaulted rooms, the oldest part of the building, have been opened to the public for the first time, to form new dining areas.

In March 2013, as the cinema celebrated its 35th anniversary, actor John Hurt was announced as patron of the cinema.

== See also ==
- Norwich Arts Centre
- Norwich Playhouse
