= Kay Adshead =

English actress, poet, playwright, artistic director, theatrical producer

- Born: 10 May 1954 (age 72); Cheetham Hill, Manchester, England
- Education: Royal Academy of Dramatic Art
- Writing career
- Genres: poet, playwright, theatremaker, actress, producer

Kay Adshead (born 10 May 1954) is a poet, playwright, theatremaker, actress and producer.

== Early life and education ==
Adshead was born in Cheetham Hill, Manchester, moving to Stretford where she was educated at Stretford Girls’ Grammar. She was a child actress with the Stretford Children’s Theatre. She trained as an actress at RADA, where she won the Emile Littler award for outstanding talent and the Bryan Mosley award for individual skill in stage-fighting. She graduated in 1975.

== Career ==
She has played leading roles in film and TV, including Cathy in the BBC classic series Wuthering Heights, Beryl Stapleton in Hound of The Baskervilles, Linda in Mike Leigh’s BBC TV film Kiss of Death, and Sue McKenna in the Film on Four Acceptable Levels.

Theatre performances include Moll Gromer in Thee and Me and Muriel in Harlequinade at the Royal National Theatre. She was Betty in Touched and sang the role of Clara Twain in White Suit Blues at The Old Vic, both directed by Sir Richard Eyre. She was Constanze in the nationwide tour of Amadeus with Keith Michell for Triumph Apollo Productions. She played Eve, Zoo, Savvy and Newly-Born in Cambridge Theatre Company’s production of Back To Methusalah culminating at the Shaw Theatre. She was Tanzi in Trafford Tanzi at the Mermaid Theatre, learning to wrestle for the role, and Liz in Juicy Bits in the main house at the Lyric Hammersmith.

In the 1980s and 1990s, Kay Adshead appeared in lead roles in fringe and experimental theatre productions and had several guest appearances in television programmes including The Bill, Dick Turpin, Victoria Wood: As Seen on TV, Over To Pam, an episode of Victoria Wood's sitcom Dinnerladies, A Bit of Fry and Laurie, an early episode of One Foot in the Grave, Mother’s Ruin, and Family Affairs.

She has also played leading roles in regional and repertory companies, including playing Viola in Twelfth Night at Nottingham Playhouse, with Tim Piggott-Smith as Orsino and Anthony Sher as Malvolio. She was Sissy in People Are Living There with Margaret Tyzack at the Royal Exchange, Manchester, Diaphanta in The Changeling, and Avril in Semi-Detached at the Bristol Old Vic with Pete Postlethwaite. She was Judith in Herod at The Sheffield Crucible, Josie in Steaming at the Harrogate Theatre, singing the role of Mrs Johnson in Blood Brothers at The Swan Theatre, Worcester, and Gila in Not Quite Jerusalem at the Liverpool Playhouse.

Adshead has directed plays including On the Verge by Eric Overmyer at The Man in The Moon, The Possibilities by Howard Barker, Fen by Caryl Churchill and Entertaining Strangers by David Edgar, all at The Lyric Hammersmith Studio. She has written and directed Bones at The Bush, The Singing Stones at The Arcola and Acts of Defiance at Theatre503. She devised and directed The Enquiry and The London Summer (two shorts) and If Anyone Recognises These Young People, all at the Roundhouse studio.

== Mama Quilla theatre company ==
In 1999, with Lucinda Gane, she cofounded theatre company Mama Quilla. Mama Quilla has produced The Bogus Woman at the Traverse and the Bush, Bites at the Bush Theatre and Bones at the Haymarket, Leicester, and the Bush. The Bogus Woman, Bites and Bones were also produced internationally and all have been published by Oberon Books.

== Filmography ==
=== Film ===
Year	Title	Role	Notes
1983	Acceptable Levels	Sue	
1985	Operation Julie	'Swan'	TV film

=== Television ===
Year	Title	Role	Notes
1977	Play for Today	Linda	Episode: "The Kiss of Death"
1978	Wuthering Heights	Catherine 'Cathy' Earnshaw	Miniseries
1982	Dick Turpin	Julsca	Episode: "The Secret Folk"
1982	Play for Today	Hotel Waitress	Episode: "Soft Targets"
1982	The Hound of the Baskervilles	Beryl Stapleton	3 episodes
1985	Victoria Wood: As Seen on TV	Freda	1 episode
1988	The Bill	Joanna Mancini	Episode: "Trouble & Strife"
1989	Victoria Wood	Lorraine Spence	Episode: "Over to Pam"
1990	One Foot in the Grave	Keep Fit Instructress	Episode: "The Big Sleep"
1992	A Bit of Fry & Laurie	Sarah/Mrs. Meddlicott	1 episode
1993	The Bill	Margaret Reagis	Episode: "No Place Like Home"
1994	Mother's Ruin	Wendy Watson	Series regular
1997	Crime Traveller	Linda	Episode: "A Death in the Family"
1997-1999	Family Affairs	Barbara Fletcher	Series regular
2000	Dinnerladies	Christine	Episode: "Christine"

== Playwright credits ==
Her credits as a playwright include:

- The Still Born – 1983 – Soho Theatre
- Thatcher's Women – 1987 Paines Plough / Tricycle Theatre – Susan Smith Blackburn Prize finalist 1987-88
- After the Party – 1987 – Altered States Theatre Company / Liverpool Playhouse / Young Vic (part of Fears and Miseries of the Third Term)
- Metal and Feathers – 1988 – Cockpit Theatre (part of Small Objects of Desire)
- Ravings: Dreamings – 1993 – Library Theatre, Manchester
- The Slug Sabbatical – 1995 – The Red Room Theatre Company / Calouste Gulbenkian Award Bursary for performance poetry
- Bacillus – 1996 – The Red Room Theatre Company following rehearsed readings at the Cockpit Theatre and the Hampstead Theatre
- Juicy Bits – 1998 – Main House, Lyric, Hammersmith
- Bogus People's Poem – 2000 – The Red Room Theatre Company / BAC
- The Bogus Woman – 2000–2001 – The Red Room Theatre Company and Mama Quilla Productions / Traverse Theatre / Bush Theatre (2000 Fringe First from The Scotsman): Susan Smith Blackburn Prize finalist 2001–02
- The Snow Egg – 2001 – Play for Children Tiebreak Theatre tour
- Lady Chill, Lady Wad, Lady Lurv, Lady God – 2001–2002 – National Theatre, part of Shell Connections
- Animal – 2003 – Soho Theatre, National Tour
- Bites – 2005 – Mama Quilla Productions / Bush Theatre - Susan Smith Blackburn Prize finalist 2005-06
- Bones – 2006 – Bush Theatre
- Bones – 2007 – Calypso Productions, Dublin, and La Compagnie Yorick, Paris
- Others – 2008 – LAMDA Long Project
- Stuffed – 2008 – Mama Quilla Productions / Broadway Theatre, Barking
- Five Crimes Reconstructed – 2009 – Mama Quilla Productions / Broadway Theatre, Barking
- Possessed – 2009 – Soho Theatre (part of Everything Must Go)
- Three Police Statements Taken from Working Girls – 2010 – Mama Quilla Productions with English Collective of Prostitutes and City Lit
- To Dismember – 2010 – John Lyons Theatre
- Protozoa – 2010 – The Red Room Theatre Company / Jellyfish Theatre
- Sweet Papaya Gold – 2010 – Mama Quilla Productions / Broadway Theatre, Barking
- Boys Talking – 2010 – Mama Quilla Productions / Broadway Theatre, Barking
- The Last Little Girl – 2011 – La Compagnie Yorick / Theatre Vitry at Cine Robespierre, Paris
- If Anyone Recognises These Young People – 2011 – Mama Quilla Productions / Broadway Theatre, Barking
- Breaking – 2011 – John Lyons Theatre
- From the Streets of Revolution – 2012 – Roundhouse
- Matter – 2012 – Mama Quilla Productions / Broadway Theatre, Barking
- F.O.M.O. – 2013 – Mama Quilla Productions / Broadway Theatre, Barking
- I Am Sad You Are Dead Mrs. T. – 2013 – Theatre503
- Happy Ending – 2013 – Natural Shocks (part of PEEP), Edinburgh Festival
- Veil – 2014 – Mama Quilla Productions, small tour / The Alchemy Festival, South Bank
- The Singing Stones – 2015 – Mama Quilla Productions / the Arcola
- Primrose, Entering Incomplete Map Data Area, Three Lotus Flowers for Acts of Defiance – 2015 – Mama Quilla Productions / Theatre503

== Awards ==
- Susan Smith Blackburn Prize finalist three times for Thatcher’s Women, The Bogus Woman and Bites, respectively
- Edinburgh Festival 2000 Fringe First for The Bogus Woman
- Manchester Evening News Best Fringe Performer for Noma Dumezweni in The Bogus Woman at the Royal Exchange, Manchester
- The Bogus Woman performed by Noma Dumezweni nominated for E.M.M.A. (Ethnic Minority in Media Award)
- Adelaide Fringe Festival 2006 Best Play of Fringe and Fringe Sensation for The Bogus Woman performed by Sarah Niles
- Nominated for Encore magazine best play of the year for Animal at the Soho theatre
