= Running to the Limits =

Running To The Limits
- Directed by: Alex Vero
- Produced by: Alex Vero, George Olver
- Starring: Alex Vero, Ben Moreau, Mengitsu Abebe
- Narrated by: Alex Vero
- Release date: December 2009 (London)
- Running time: 54 minutes
- Country: United Kingdom
- Language: English

Running To The Limits is a 2009 documentary film about filmmaker Alex Vero's journey to qualify for the 2008 Beijing Olympic Marathon. Narrated by Vero and set against the backdrop of a massive decline in British professional marathon running, the film spans over three years and several continents as he works to overcome physical and personal demons and complete his marathon training. It features Vero's story, as well as those of famous runners and coaches who he meets while training. The film won for Best Documentary at the 2009 Norwich Film Festival, screened in the UK and was broadcast by Channel 4.

== Synopsis ==
During a six-week recovery from surgery to remove a pilonidal sinus in his back, filmmaker Alex Vero decides to take up the challenge of qualifying for the Beijing Olympic Marathon in 2008 by running a marathon in 2 hours and 20 minutes, and making a documentary in the process. He begins training, and quickly realizes that he is massively out of shape and suffers debilitating shin splints. He joins a running club, begins training with legendary distance runner Bruce Tulloh and undergoes physical therapy to evaluate his progress, refusing to give up when his physical evaluation says he would fail to complete a marathon in under 2:45 hours.

While running the Majorca Marathon to raise 40,000 for investment in further filming and training, he collapses from heat stroke, and vows the stop the project. However, after several months of slow recovery, he begins again, completing both the Wokingham Half Marathon and the Amsterdam Half Marathon, finishing the latter in 1:13:46, restoring his confidence. Vero's journey begins to gain press attention online from running blogs, and generates reactions from marathon runners globally. Due to his success against the odds, he is invited to train with the captain of the Belgrave Harriers at coach Frank Horwill's endurance sessions. His training helps him overcome a cold and finishes the Amsterdam Half Marathon. Meanwhile, he meets young runner Ben Moreau, who exhibits a talent for running that Vero says he cannot match.

Emboldened by his recent success, Vero travels to Africa to study the success of East African distance runners, where he meets hotel bellboy Mengistu Abebe, himself a talented marathon runner, and begins to train with Vero. The film ends as Abebe attempts to win the Bristol Half Marathon to gain status as a runner and propel him to international success against Ben Moreau. Moreau eventually wins, and goes on to run the fastest time in the Amsterdam Marathon.
