= My Imprisoned Heart =

- Written by: Judy Upton
- Produced by: Louis Savy
- Starring: Bella Heesom, Alex Falk, Deborah Bouchard
- Release date: 2007
- Running time: 59 minutes
- Country: United Kingdom
- Language: English

My Imprisoned Heart is a short drama-comedy film made in 2007 by the Make Your Mark in Film campaign. The screenplay was written by Judy Upton and stars Bella Heesom (Emma), Alex Falk (Jamie) and Deborah Bouchard (Avril). It was produced in ten five-minute segments.

== Plot ==
The plot centres around a young woman named Emma (played By Bella Heesom) who has just split up with her fiance, Jamie (played by Alex Falk), after he cheated on her. Not sure how to cope with the pain and rejection and seeing Jamie with another girlfriend, Emma tricks Jamie into going into an abandoned warehouse filled with his possessions. Once inside, she locks him in indefinitely.

Using her expertise as a performance artist, Emma sets up a website and broadcasts Jamie's every move over a webcam to an audience of millions. The new phenomenon sweeps the nation's media; Emma becomes scared, and doesn't know how to end the revenge, which has got out of control. She asks her friend Avril (played by Deborah Bouchard) to help her get some money so they can leave the country. Just as they are about to let Jamie out, he tricks them and locks them back in the warehouse, broadcasting their movements over the internet.

== Release ==
The film premiered at the Edinburgh International Film Festival on August 22, 2007, and was later shown on Propeller TV.
