= Sonsbeek =

Outdoor sculpture exhibition in the Netherlands

Coordinates: 51.9919°N 5.904°E

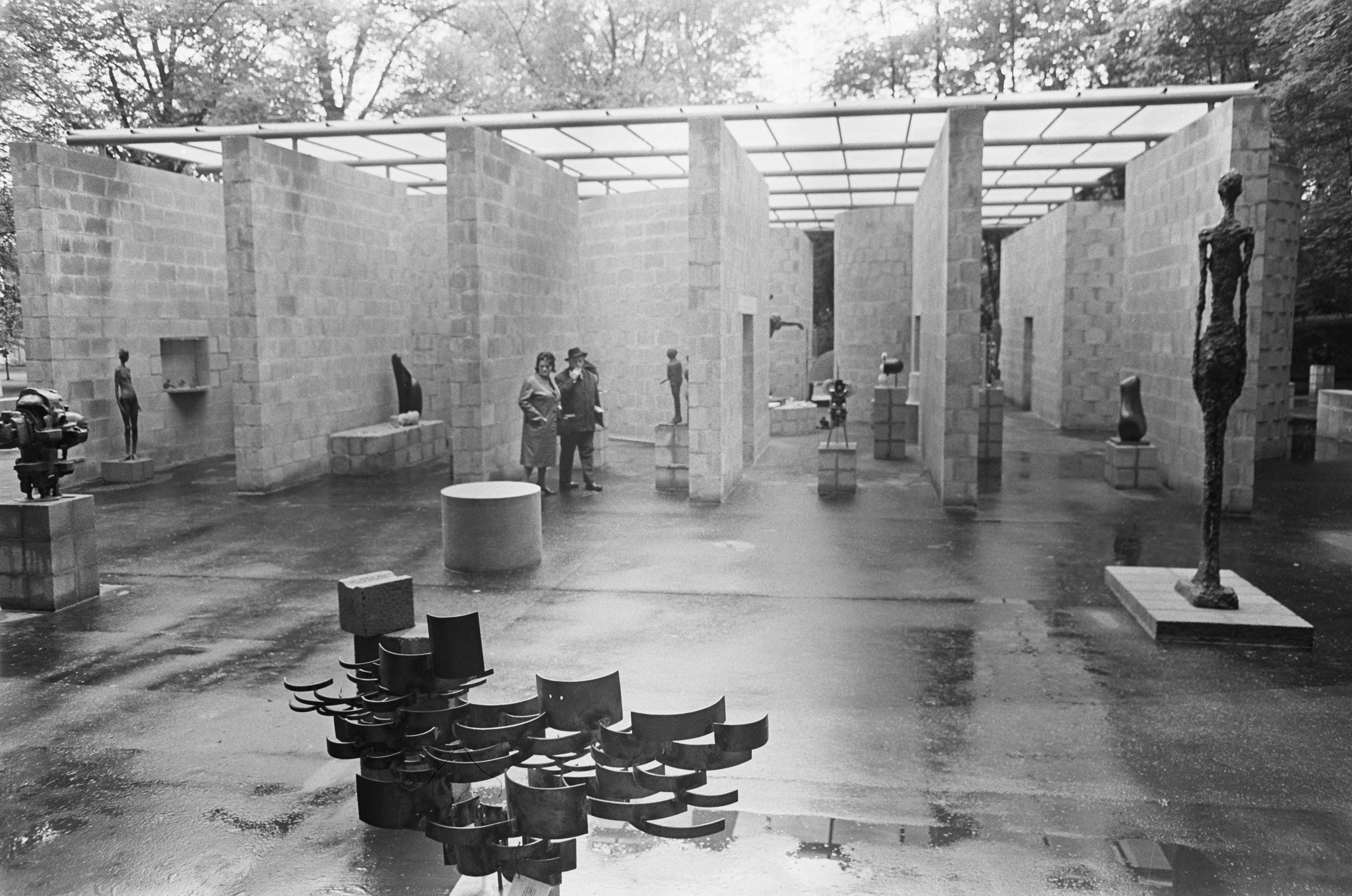
- Giacometti sculptures at 1966 Sonsbeek
- Frequency: irregular schedule
- Years active: 1949 to present
- Organiser: Sonsbeek Foundation
- Website: www.sonsbeek20-24.org/en/

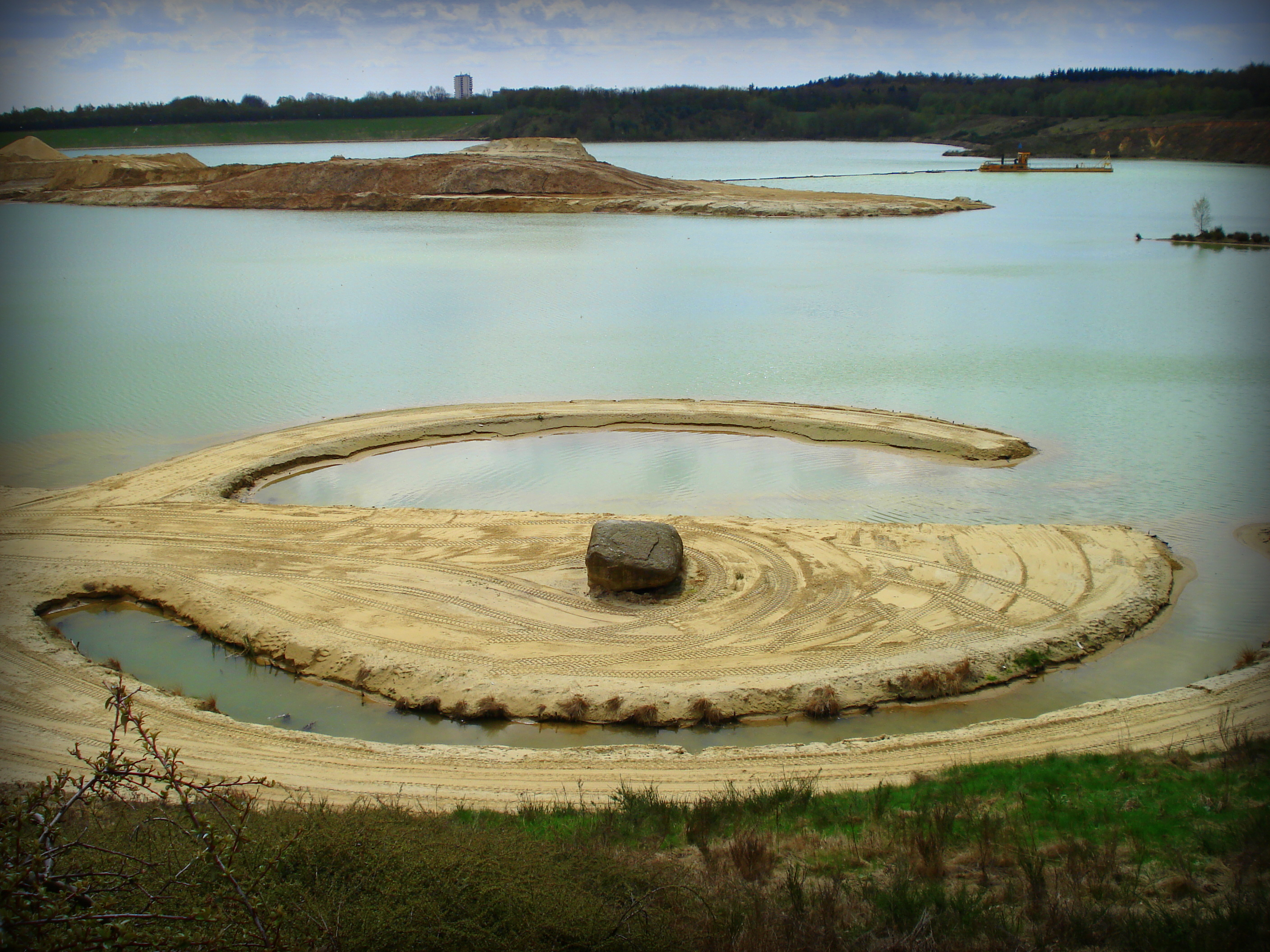
Robert Smithson, Broken Circle/Spiral Hill, 1971 Sonsbeek exhibition (photographed in 2006)

Sonsbeek is an outdoor sculpture exhibition series founded in 1949, that takes place intermittently in Park Sonsbeek in Arnhem, the Netherlands. It was originally intended as a biennial exhibition, although that format has since been abandoned. Subsequent editions were organized in 1971, 1986, 1993, 2001, 2008, and 2016.

The exhibition's most recent edition, Force Times Distance: On Labor and Its Sonic Ecologies, opened in October 2021 and will be on view through 2024. Due to the delays caused by the COVID-19 pandemic, it is the first iteration of the Sonsbeek show that will remain on view for four years.

== History ==
Sonsbeek was initiated in an attempt to repair the heavy damage the city had suffered during the Battle of Arnhem during the Second World War.

=== Inaugural exhibition (1949) ===
The 1949 inaugural exhibition featured over 200 sculptures that were installed along the park's pathways. It was attended by over 100,000 visitors. The first instalment included artists such as Auguste Rodin, Henry Moore, and Pablo Picasso. Later exhibitions featured artists such as Jenny Holzer, Claes Oldenburg and others.

=== Sonsbeek buiten de perken (1971) ===
The 1971 installment of the show titled Sonsbeek buiten de perken (Sonsbeek out of bounds) was among the best known, and often criticized, of the Sonsbeek exhibitions. In that edition, curator Wim Bereem conceived it as a venue for experimentation and investigation of the issues of "space and spatial relationships" that would include sculpture, conceptual art, as well as video art and film. He commissioned works outside of the traditional boundaries of the park, including two large-scale earth projects, Broken Circle/Spiral Hill by Robert Smithson and The Observatory by Robert Morris. These were the only major land art installations in Europe ever completed by American artists.

=== Subsequent editions (1986 to now) ===
The 1993 installment was curated by Valerie Smith, and included the artists Ann Hamilton, Mike Kelley, Annette Messager and others. Other curators have included Jan Hoet (2001), Saskia Bos (1986), and the Indonesian art collective, Ruangrupa in 2016. Sonsbeek 9, "Locus Focus" took place in 2011 in three venues, Sonsbeek Park, Eusebius church at a suburban shopping mall (Kronenburg).

The Sonsbeek 20 to 24 exhibition was slated to open in 2020, but was postponed to 2021 due to the COVID-19 pandemic. It opened in October 2021 under the title Force Times Distance: On Labor and Its Sonic Ecologies and will remain on view until 2024. In October 2022, it was reported that the curators of Sonsbeek's most recent edition had left abruptly due to what its artistic director, Bonaventure Soh Bejeng Ndikung, had described as “precarious and ultimately unbearable" working conditions. In addition to Ndikung, the other members of the curatorial team who had announced their departure included Antonia Alampi, Amal Alhaag, Zippora Elders, Aude Christel Mbga, and Vincent van Velsen.
