= OPEN Norwich =

Event venue in Norwich, England

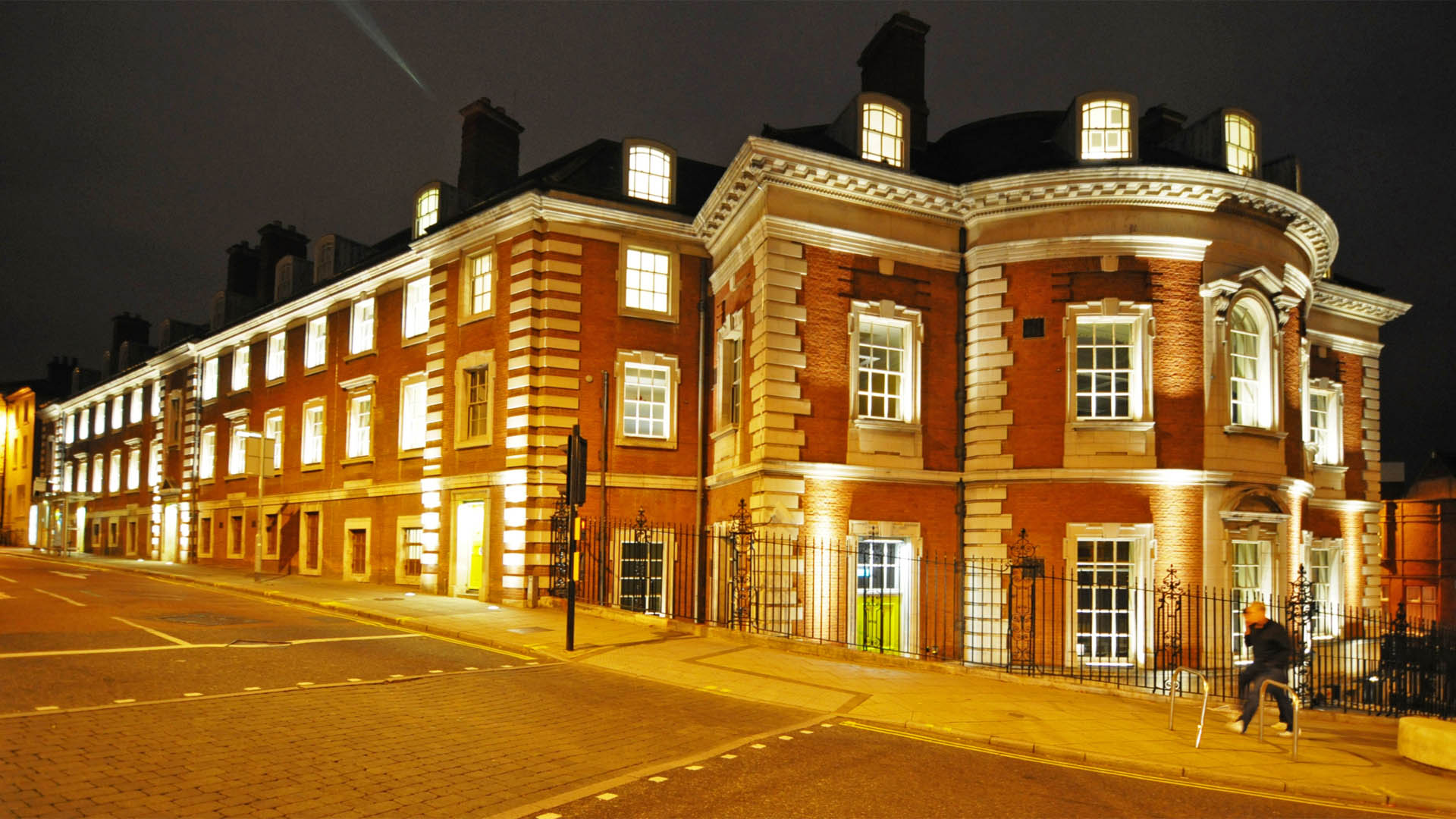
- Interactive map of OPEN Norwich
- Former names: Barclays Bank Ltd
- Address: 20 Bank Plain; Norwich; NR2 4SF
- Location: Norwich
- Coordinates: 52.6295°N 1.2974°E
- Operator: OPEN Youth Trust
- Seating type: Temporary
- Capacity: 1,450

Construction
- Architect: Hudsons Architects

Tenants
- The Prince's Trust

Website
- Official website

Listed Building – Grade II
- Official name: Barclays Bank and Attached Area Railings
- Designated: 8 April 1981
- Reference no.: 1205165

OPEN was a venue and conferencing, live music & events space in Norwich, England. It is situated in the city centre, at the top of the Norwich Lanes. It is a Grade II listed building which was previously the regional headquarters for Barclays Bank. The original building was refurbished and reopened in 2010 as the home for its namesake, OPEN Youth Trust.

== History ==
The original building was sold to Barlett Gurney in 1779 for the purpose of establishing the Gurney's Bank. Gurney also installed bullion safes in the former wine cellars. In 1896, 20 banks including the Gurney's Bank were amalgamated under the name of Barclay & Co Ltd. Barclays soon outgrew their premises and in 1926 a new building was designed with a huge banking hall, offices and strong rooms.

As a bank it was reputed to have had the longest banking counter in the UK, and became the regional headquarters of Barclays until it was sold to the Lind Trust in 2003.

== OPEN Youth Trust ==
After purchasing the building, the Lind Trust established a Youth Forum whose primary aim was to assess the needs of young people in Norfolk. In 2005 the OPEN Youth Trust (OPEN) received charitable status. The charity currently relies on funding from grants and donations from Trusts, business and individuals.

The building has a capacity of 1,450 standing people in its live events area. In 2017, plans were submitted to increase this number to 1,800.

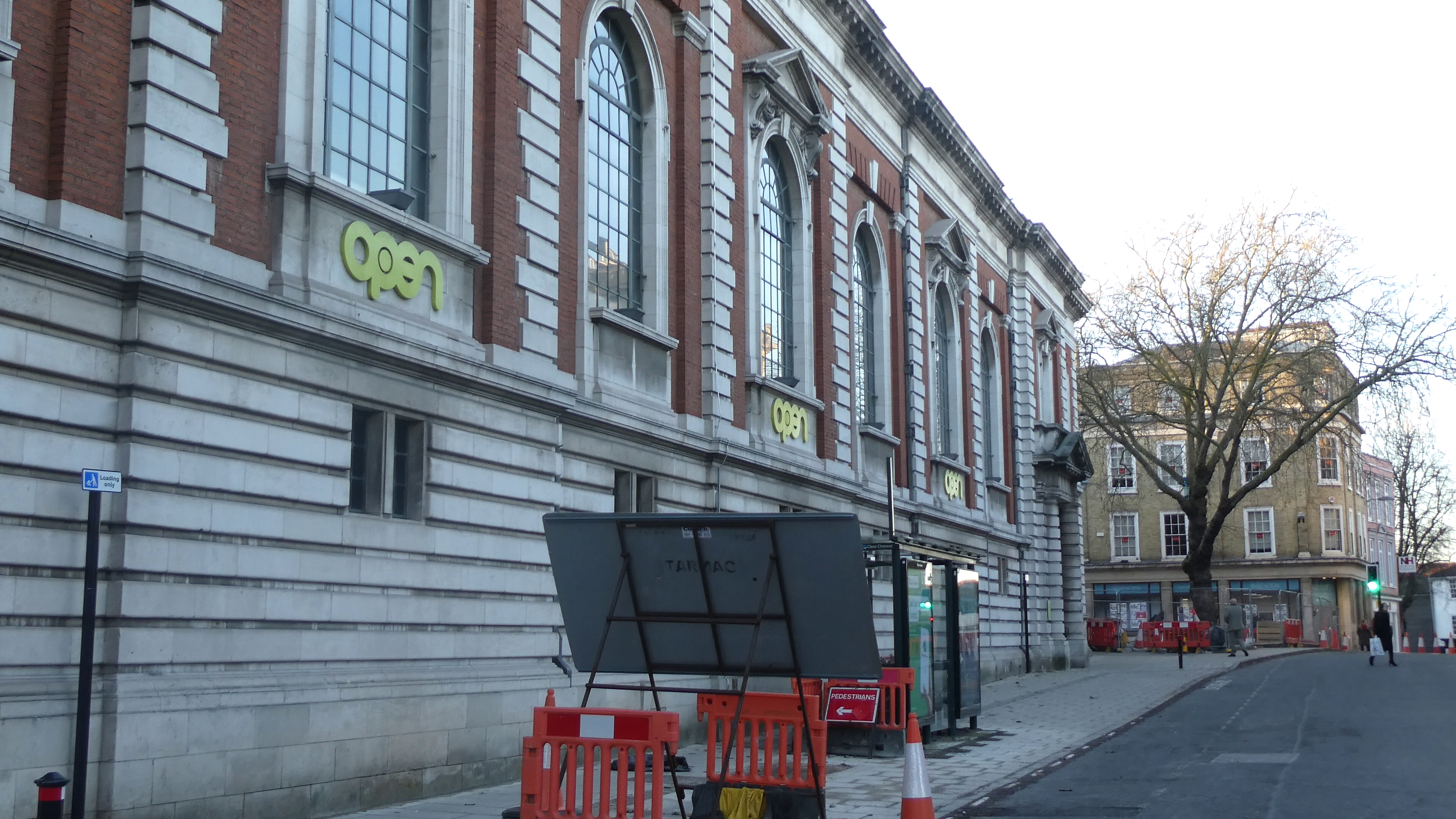
The side of the building on Bank Plain.

In April 2020, the OPEN Youth Trust went into liquidation. In 2022, it was announced that the building would be taken over by the Norwich University of the Arts.
