= The Red Room Theatre Company =

Theatre company based in London, United Kingdom

- Address: Garden Studios, Shelton Street Street, Covent Garden; London; United Kingdom

Construction
- Opened: 1995

Website
- http://www.theredroom.org.uk/

The Red Room Theatre Company is a theatre company based in London, United Kingdom. In the 1990s, it was an important venue for new play writing.

== Description ==
It was founded in 1995 by Lisa Goldman as a voluntary organization and became regularly funded by Arts Council England in 2002. It then achieved charity status in 2006 (charity number 1110724). The Red Room believes theater should be a truly public art form.

In August 2006, Topher Campbell succeeded Lisa Goldman as the artistic director. As a director with widespread experience in theater, film, television and radio, Topher has worked with venues such as the West Yorkshire Playhouse, Gate Theatre, Young Vic, BBC, Channel 4, the British Film Institute London Lesbian and Gay Film Festival and is co-founder of rukus! Federation Ltd. rukus! Federation Ltd is the UK's award-winning Black Lesbian and Gay arts company.

For over ten years, the Red Room has produced theatre and film in London. It creates collaborations between writers, artists, and communities to contribute to social debate.

In addition to its productions, the Red Room has involved itself in the past in debates and activism around culture and politics, such as Going Public (2003), a debate at the Tricycle Theatre about theater as a public art form, with contributions from the RSC, Cardboard Citizens and Outside Edge. The Red Room also initiated the network Artists Against the War (2003), exhibiting art work and supporting anti-war artists with events including Palestine Verbatim in Trafalgar Square and Shock and Awe cabaret.

== Platforms ==
The Red Room also hosts Red Room Platforms. An open free discussion and performance-based events that bring artists, activists, and the general public together. Recent platforms include:

- "Broken Britain" Featuring UK Hip Hop artist Skittles, playwrights Laurence Wilson and Luke E Barnes, Spoken Word artist Curtis Watt
- "Riot Response" An investigation into the August 2011 UK Riots
- "Gay Africa" A response to the human rights and sexuality crisis sweeping the African Continent.
- "Women's Edition" A Platform that sought to revive the energy and optimism of the women's movement
- Military Families against the War Featuring anti-war campaigner Rose Gentle.
- Injustice featuring the film Injustice by Ken Faro.
- Why are we Afraid of a Young An examination of youth violence masculinity and the culture of fear
- Loving Big Brother, based on John McGrath's book Loving Big Brother: Surveillance Culture and Performance Space

== Productions ==
Of over 20 productions and projects, the most recent works are: "Lost Nation", "Invisible", "The Oikos Project", "Oikos", "Protozoa", Unstated, Hoxton Story, Snake Park, Stitching, Animal, and The Bogus Woman.

- Artistic Director: Topher Campbell
- Producer: Bryan Savery
- Administrator: Tanya Campbell
- Digital Projects and Marketing: Debo Adebayo

== Awards ==
- 2011 Small Project Award winner
- 2011 Nominated for The AKA What’s on Stage Theatre Event of the Year Award
- 2010 Nominated for the Urban Intervention Award Berlin
- 2003 Time Out Award 'Best Off West End Production'; Stitching
- 2002 Herald Angel Award; Stitching Runner-up Evening Standard Award 'Most Promising Playwright'; Anthony Neilson for Stitching
- 2001 Manchester Evening News 'Best Fringe Performance'; The Bogus Woman
- 2000 The Scotsman 'Fringe First Award'; The Bogus Woman Runner-up Susan Smith Blackburn Award; Kay Adshead for The Bogus Woman Runner-up Emma Award 'Best production'; The Bogus Woman
- 1997 Time Out Award 'Best Fringe Production'; The Censor Writers Guild Award 'Best Play'; The Censor Guinness Ingenuity Award; The Big Story Season
- 1996 Guinness Ingenuity Award; Coming to Land Season

== Current collaborations ==
- European Culture 2000: @Work with: Sweden: TeaterMaskinen, Finland: RealityResearch, Denmark: TeaterKunst, Norway: KatteniSekken, Germany: ProdesseDelectare
