= Norwich Arts Centre =

Live music venue, theatre and art gallery in Norwich, England

- Norwich Arts Centre in 2020
- Interactive map of Norwich Arts Centre
- Former names: Church of St Swithin
- Address: St Benedict's Street; NR2 4PG; Norwich
- Location: Norwich
- Coordinates: 52.63161°N 1.28776°E
- Capacity: Under 300 standing

Construction
- Built: 1349
- Opened: 1977

Website
- Official website

Norwich Arts Centre (NAC) is a live music venue, theatre and art gallery located partially in St Swithin's Church, a Grade I listed redundant parish church on St Benedict's Street in Norwich, Norfolk, England.

Dedicated to Saint Swithun, the church likely stood from Anglo-Saxon times, though was rebuilt in the 15th century. Its tower was removed in the early 1880s due to safety issues. Falling into disrepair at the end of the 19th century, it reopened for a time as an Evangelical church from 1905, and then was a Home Guard headquarters during World War II. It saw use as a furniture warehouse until 1980.

A group for Norwich Arts Centre formed in 1976 and in 1977 established itself as 'Premises' in a former carpet factory also on St Benedict's Street before moving into St Swithin's Church in 1980. With a capacity in the 1980s of 300 people, the venue saw music, dance, theatre and comedy performances, as well as Richey Edwards' self-harm incident on 15 May 1991. In 2014, it was named 'Britain's Best Small Venue' by NME.

== History ==
=== St Swithin's Church ===
The redundant church which houses the Norwich Arts Centre is dedicated to Saint Swithun, one of four with this dedication in Norfolk. An earlier, Anglo-Saxon church may have existed on the site, as indicated by this dedication as Swithun died in the year 862. This church would have been the same length as the present building. It appeared as (Ecclesia) Sancti Swithuni in its first surviving documentary reference in the 1254 Valuation of Norwich; it was valued at 6s 8d.

In the 15th century, the church was rebuilt in full. Following this, the church was wealthy for the next three centuries, reflecting the wealth of the area with three other medieval churches close by.

In the 18th century, there were still some wealthy parishioners. However, the area had become a slum by the nineteenth century. St Swithin's became redundant and was closed in 1881. In that year, or in 1882, the church's tower was demolished as it had become unsafe, and this was later replaced by a bell-cot. The building was back in use as a church from 1883 until 1891, after which time it fell into disrepair.

In 1905, a clergyman, John Sawbridge, raised funds for it to be reopened as an Evangelical church, to cater for the poor and deprived surrounding area. This involved a significant restoration of the church. There was sufficient money for a large, adjoining parish mission and school room to be constructed in 1908. During the following decades, this building served the local community in a number of ways. During the Second World War, it was the headquarters of the local Home Guard.

By 1951, the church was again redundant due to falling numbers of local residents. It became a shoe store. In 1954, the church was designated a Grade I listed building. It was used as a furniture warehouse until 1980.

Little of the interior of the church remains in place at present. Medieval features in the interior, including two choir-stalls that were recorded by Nikolaus Pevsner, no longer exist. An exception are ten monuments, the oldest being to Sibilla Skottowe (died 1657) and Anne Skottowe (died 1662). Another monument is to William Abbott (1754-1818), a veteran of the American War of Independence, who served at the Battle of Bunker Hill.

=== Norwich Arts Centre ===
In 1976, a group formed for the purpose of starting an alternative venue for the visual and performing arts in Norwich. With the help of Norwich City Council the venue was opened in 1977 in a former carpet factory on St Benedict's Street and named Premises Arts Centre. In January 1978, the centre registered as a charity, and as of 2026 continues as such.

Norwich Arts Centre moved to St Swithin's Church in 1980 and has remained there since. The church itself became an auditorium, and the schoolroom became an exhibition space and cafe. During the conversion to an auditorium, the church interior was stripped of many of its church features.

In 1985, Norwich Arts Centre had a capacity of 300 people. It was seen as inadequate as a venue for its acoustics, and rock acts were forced to compete for bookings at the venue alongside jazz bands, theatre companies, stand-up comedians, and dance troupes. However, it was one of the only main music venues in the city aside from the venue at the University of East Anglia and various clubs. The Norwich Venue Campaign was established in 1985 and worked to create The Waterfront as a competing venue. Despite the Arts Centre's opposition to the Waterfront project, the losses incurred by Norwich Arts Centre at the time (at £27,000 in 1990) meant this opposition was not shared by Norwich City Council and the Waterfront opened in October 1990. Before becoming globally popular, Nirvana performed at the Norwich Arts Centre in 1989, though instead performed at the Waterfront once it had opened.

Following a gig at Norwich Arts Centre on 15 May 1991, Richey Edwards of the Manic Street Preachers carved the words "4 Real" into his forearm with a razor blade following an interview with journalist Steve Lamacq, who had accused the band of inauthenticity. Edwards was then taken to hospital, receiving 17 stitches. The image was voted number 16 in Q's '100 Greatest Rock Photographs of All Time'. Peter Steggals has called the incident of self-harm "one of contemporary rock music's most infamous moments and one of its most challenging images."

On 6 June 1994, two years prior to their debut album Definitely Maybe, Oasis performed at Norwich Arts Centre. This was their only concert in Norwich.

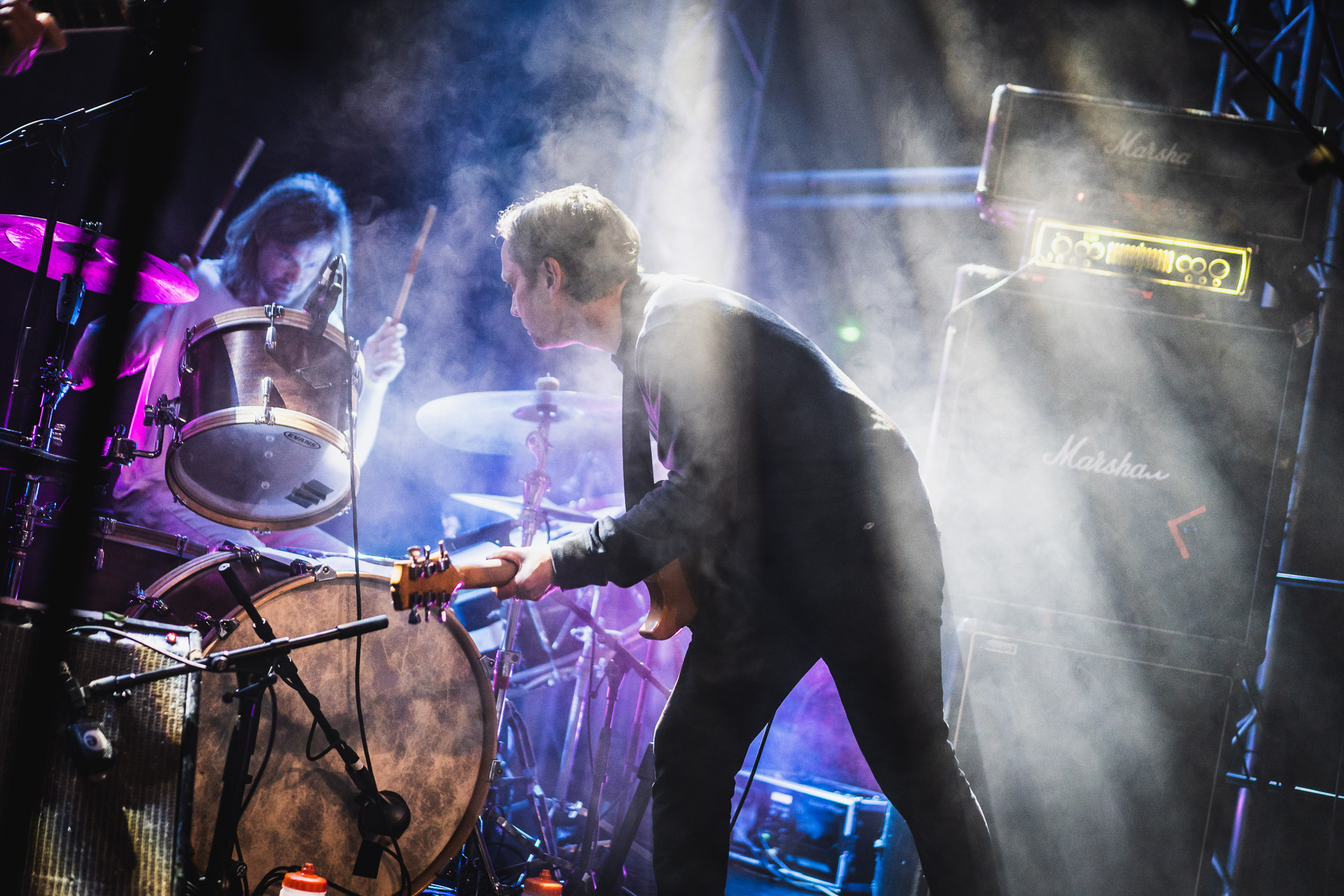
Sea Power performing at the Norwich Arts Centre in October 2021

As of 2014, the venue had a capacity of less than 300 people for standing music concerts. In November 2014, Norwich Arts Centre was named "Britain's Best Small Venue" by NME, an award given to venues with under 1,000 people in capacity. Comedian Adam Buxton became a patron of the venue in 2023.

== Architecture ==
The church building dates to the 14th and 15th centuries, and consists of flint accompanied by dressings in stone and brick with a lead roof. It has a nave, chancel, north and south aisles, and chapels, though no tower or significant entrance. Its nave and chancel are not separate, consisting of four bays in total. There is a rood turret by the north aisle; it is positioned such that the original rood screen would have crossed the church halfway along its length, splitting the nave and chancel into two bays each. There are north and south aisles to the church with two-light windows in a decorated style in each bay. Above, the clerestory windows are also two-light; they are square-headed and are in a perpendicular style. Inside the building, the north aisle features hollow chamfered octagonal brick piers, a standard perpendicular arcade, whereas the south aisle has piers which are remade in a classical cruciform shape with semi-circular arches, which were remodelled in the classical style around 1700. The roof has a queen-post structure, and arch braces for this roof come from wall-posts which sit on angel-shaped corbels. At the levels of the purlins and ridges of the roof, there are carved bosses.

The west tower, which was removed in 1882, was flanked by two porches in a similar manner to St Gregory's in the city, with the entrance likely being to the west. Its removal was the result of its undermining by excavations for new sewers, making it unsafe. Today, there is a small bell-cot on the west gable, under which is a four-light west window. At present, entry to the church building is through the former place of the altar in the east wall. The decorated east window has a four-centre arch.

Located to the north and east of the church building is a big Edwardian hall and vestry. This was the Mission Hall, built in 1908 following a large benefaction. It is as large as the church building. It now contains a restaurant, galleries, and offices.

In the churchyard, there is a 19th-century well.

=== Fittings and monuments ===
There were formerly several fittings in the church, all of which have now been removed. These included an East Anglian font depicting lions, a screen from 1905 which separated the altar from the rest of the church, and an organ which is now at Heckingham.

There remain monuments in the church to Anne Scottowe (d. 1650), William Willcocks (d. 1770), Catherine Suckling (mother of Horatio Nelson, d. 1767) and Abraham Robertson (d. 1777).

== See also ==
- The Waterfront, Norwich
- Norwich Cinema City
- Norwich Playhouse
