= Norwich Playhouse =

Theatre in Norwich, Norfolk, England

Coordinates: 52.6321°N 1.2943°E

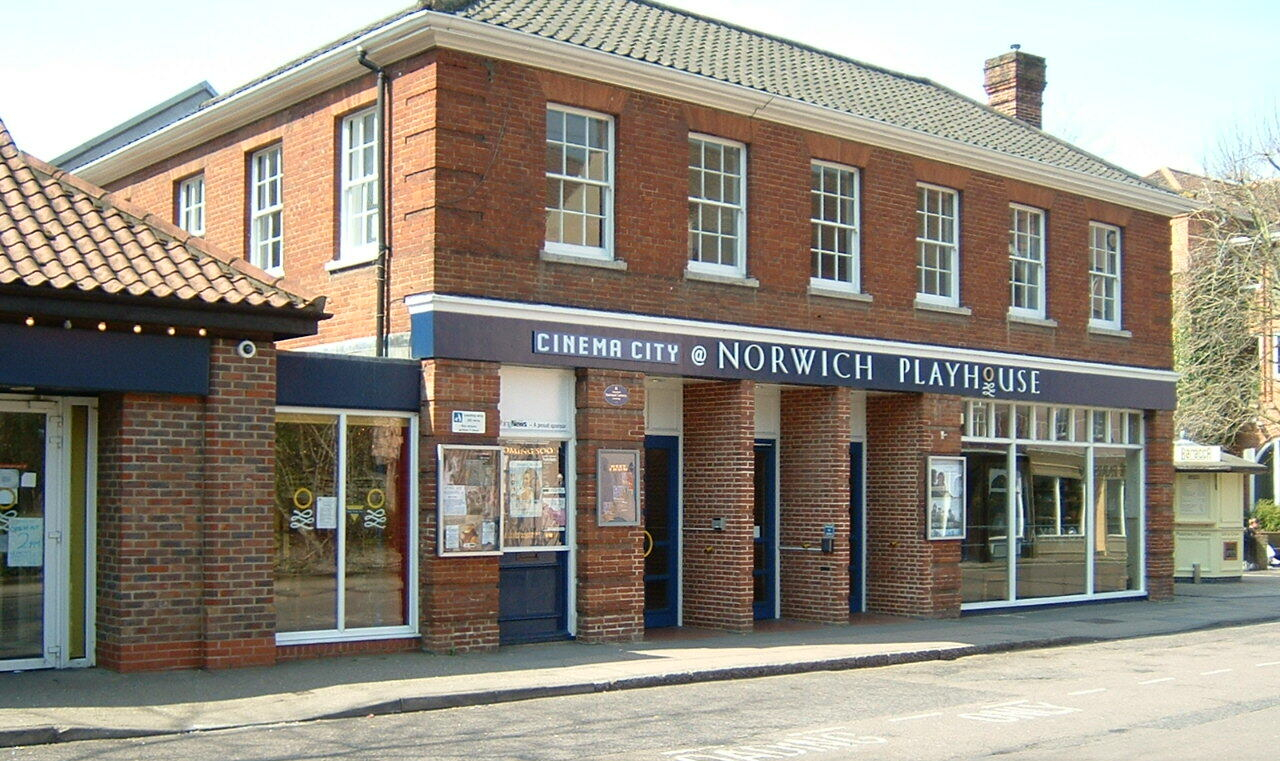
Norwich Playhouse

The Norwich Playhouse is a theatre in St George's Street, Norwich, Norfolk, England.

The theatre opened in 1995 in a nineteenth-century building that was once a maltings, and is a 300-seat receiving house for theatre arts including comedy, music, and cabaret. The theatre's bar opened in 1998.

In March 2018 the Playhouse won a Chortle Award, naming it the Best Comedy Venue in the East & Midlands. Comedians who have appeared at the theatre include Mark Watson, Tim Minchin, and Sara Pascoe. Television personality and theatre actor Stephen Fry is a patron.

== See also ==
- Norwich Arts Centre
- Norwich Cinema City
