= Stitching (play) =

Play by Anthony Neilso

- Original language: English
- Written by: Anthony Neilson
- Characters: Abby; Stu
- Genre: In-yer-face theatre

Premiere
- Date: 1 August 2002
- Place: Traverse Theatre, Edinburgh

Stitching is a play by Anthony Neilson. It premiered at the Traverse Theatre in Edinburgh on 1 August 2002 and later transferred to the Bush Theatre in London on 12 September 2002.

The play is notable for being at the centre of a censorship controversy when it was banned from being performed in Malta in 2010.
