= Peter Kürten =

German serial killer (1883–1931)

- Mugshot of Peter Kürten taken in 1931
- Born: 26 May 1883; Mülheim am Rhein, German Empire
- Died: 2 July 1931 (aged 48); Klingelpütz Prison, Cologne, Weimar Republic
- Cause of death: Execution by guillotine
- Other names: The Vampire of Düsseldorf; The Düsseldorf Monster
- Motive: Sadistic sexual gratification Vengeance against society
- Convictions: Murder (9 counts); Attempted murder (7 counts); Arson; Attempted robbery Breaking and entering Burglary; Seduction; Theft; Threatening behaviour
- Penalty: Death

Details
- Victims: Murders: 9+ Attempted murder: 31+
- Span of crimes: 25 May 1913 – 7 November 1929
- Country: German Empire
- States: Rhine Province, Prussia
- Date apprehended: 24 May 1930

Peter Kürten (German: [ˈpeːtɐ ˈkʏʁtn̩]; 26 May 1883 – 2 July 1931) was a German serial killer, known as The Vampire of Düsseldorf and the Düsseldorf Monster, who committed a series of murders and sexual assaults between February and November 1929 in the city of Düsseldorf. In the years before these assaults and murders, Kürten had amassed a lengthy criminal record for offences including arson and attempted murder. He also confessed to the 1913 murder of a nine-year-old girl in Mülheim am Rhein and the attempted murder of a 17-year-old girl in Düsseldorf.

Described by Karl Berg as "the king of the sexual perverts", Kürten was found guilty of nine counts of murder and seven counts of attempted murder for which he was sentenced to death by beheading in April 1931. He was executed via guillotine in July 1931, at age 48.

Kürten became known as the "Vampire of Düsseldorf" because he occasionally made attempts to drink the blood from his victims' wounds. He also became known as the "Düsseldorf Monster" both because the majority of his murders were committed in and around the city of Düsseldorf, and due to the savagery he inflicted upon his victims' bodies.

== Early life ==
=== Childhood ===
Peter Kürten was born into a poverty-stricken, abusive family in Mülheim am Rhein on 26 May 1883, the oldest of thirteen children (two of whom died at an early age). Kürten's parents were both alcoholics who lived in a one-bedroom apartment, and Kürten's father frequently beat his wife and children, particularly when he was drunk. When intoxicated, Kürten's father often forced his wife and children to assemble before him before ordering his wife to strip naked and have sex with him as his children watched. He was jailed for eighteen months in 1897 for repeatedly raping his eldest daughter, who was aged 13. Shortly thereafter, Kürten's mother obtained a separation order, and later remarried and relocated to Düsseldorf.

In 1888, Kürten attempted to drown one of his playmates. Four years later, he befriended a local dog-catcher who lived in the same building as his family and began accompanying him on his rounds. This individual often tortured and killed the animals he caught, and Kürten soon became an active and willing participant in torturing the animals.

Being the eldest surviving son, Kürten was the target of much of his father's physical abuse and frequently refused to return home from school as a result. Although he was a good student, he later recollected his academic performance suffered due to the extensive physical violence he endured. From an early age, Kürten often ran away from home for periods of time ranging from days to weeks. Much of the time Kürten spent on the streets was in the company of petty criminals and social misfits. Via these acquaintances, Kürten was introduced to various forms of petty crime, which he initially committed as a means of feeding and clothing himself when living on the streets.

Kürten later claimed to have committed his first murders at the age of nine, when he pushed a school friend whom he knew was unable to swim off a log raft. When a second boy attempted to save the drowning youngster, Kürten held his head under the water so that both boys drowned. Both deaths were ruled by authorities as being accidental.

=== Adolescence ===
At the age of thirteen, Kürten formed a relationship with a girl his age and, although she allowed Kürten to undress and fondle her, she would resist any attempts he made to engage in intercourse. To relieve his sexual urges, Kürten resorted to acts of bestiality with sheep, pigs and goats in local stables, but later claimed he obtained his greatest sense of elation if he stabbed the animals just before achieving orgasm. Kürten claimed he began stabbing and slashing animals with increasing frequency to achieve orgasms, although he was adamant this behaviour ended when he was observed stabbing a pig. He also attempted to rape the same sister his father had earlier molested.

In 1897, Kürten left school. At his father's insistence, he obtained employment as an apprentice moulder. This apprenticeship lasted for two years before Kürten stole all the money he could find in his household, plus approximately 300 gold marks from his employer, and ran away from home. He relocated to Koblenz, where he began a brief relationship with a prostitute two years his senior whom, he claimed, willingly submitted to every form of sexual perversion he demanded of her. He was apprehended four weeks later and charged with both breaking and entering and theft, and subsequently sentenced to one month's imprisonment. He was released from prison in August 1899 and reverted to a life of petty crime. (Note: This proved to be the first of seventeen instances in which Kürten was imprisoned throughout his life. In total, Kürten would serve seventeen separate sentences of imprisonment between 1899 and his final arrest, the combined total being twenty-seven.)

== First attempted murder ==
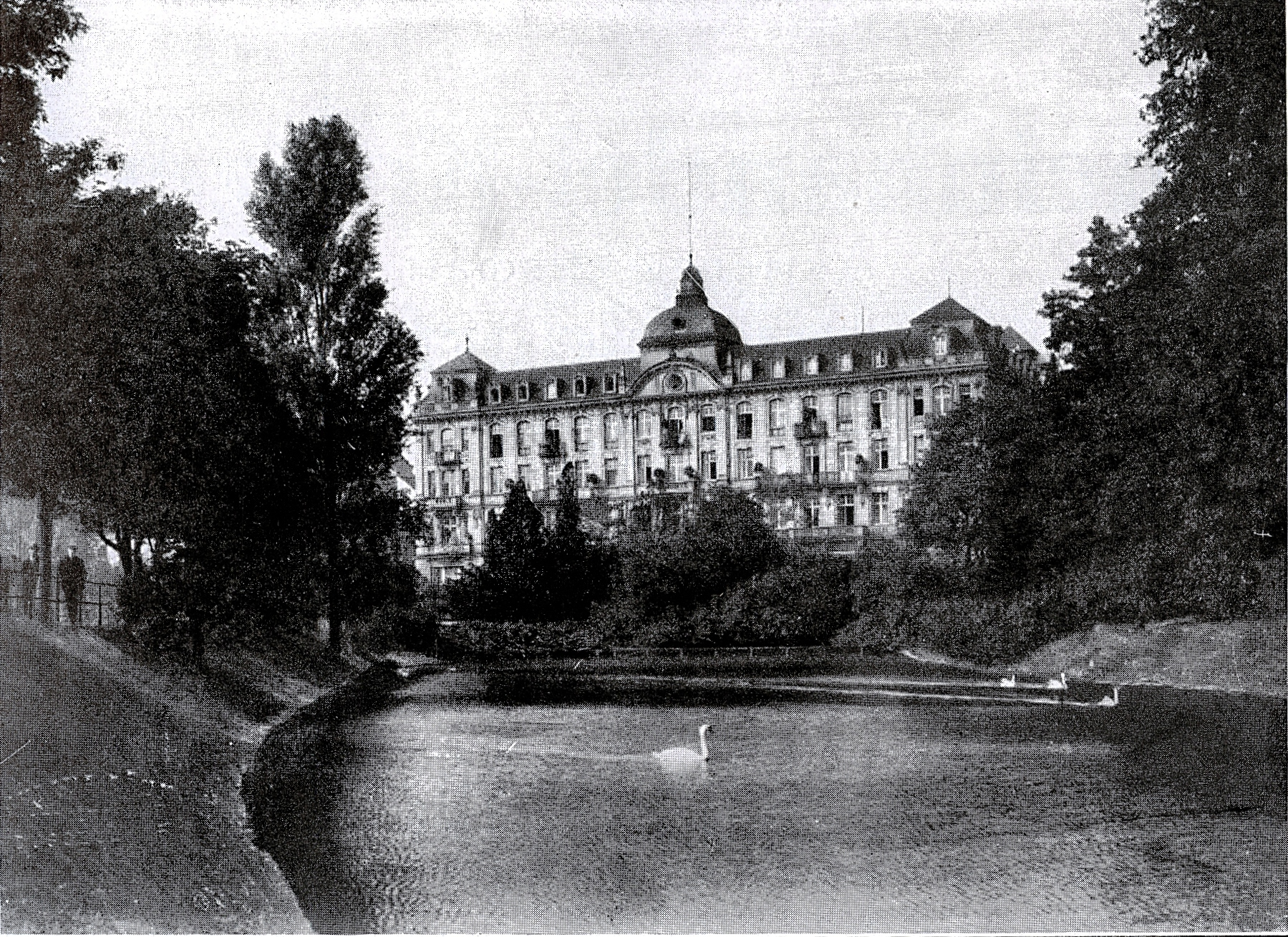
The courtyard of Düsseldorf's Hofgarten. Kürten claimed to have committed his first murder close to this location in November 1899.

Kürten claimed to have committed his first murder in adulthood in November 1899. In his 1930 confessions to investigators, he claimed to have "picked up an 18-year-old girl at the Alleestraße" and persuaded her to accompany him to the Hofgarten. There, he claimed to have engaged in sex with the girl before strangling her into unconsciousness with his bare hands before leaving the scene, believing her to be dead.

No contemporaneous records exist to corroborate Kürten's claims. If this attack did take place, the victim likely survived this assault. Nonetheless, Kürten later stated that, via committing this act, he had proven to himself that the greatest heights of sexual ecstasy could only be achieved in this manner.

=== First convictions ===
Shortly thereafter, in 1900, Kürten was arrested for fraud. He would be rearrested later the same year on the same charge, although on this second occasion, charges pertaining to his 1899 Düsseldorf thefts, plus the attempted murder of a girl with a firearm, were added to the indictment. Consequently, Kürten was sentenced to four years' imprisonment in October 1900. He served this sentence in Derendorf, a borough of Düsseldorf.

Released in the summer of 1904, Kürten was drafted into the Imperial German Army; he was deployed to the city of Metz in Lorraine to serve in the 98th Infantry Regiment, although he soon deserted. That autumn, Kürten began committing acts of arson, which he would discreetly watch from a distance as emergency services attempted to extinguish the fires. The majority of these fires were in barns and haylofts, and Kürten would admit to police he had committed around twenty-four acts of arson upon his arrest that New Year's Eve. He also claimed these fires had been committed both for his sexual excitement and in the hope of burning sleeping tramps alive. (Note: An FBI profile of Kürten's criminal behaviour concluded his compulsion to abuse and torture animals and to commit arson were a manifestation of his need to feel a sense of control in response to his chronically abusive upbringing.)

As a result of his desertion, Kürten was tried by the military court and convicted of desertion in addition to multiple counts of arson, robbery and attempted robbery (the latter charges pertaining to acts he had also committed that year), and was subsequently imprisoned from 1905 to 1913. He served his sentence in Münster, with much of his time spent in solitary confinement for repeated instances of insubordination. He would later claim to investigators and psychologists this period of incarceration was that in which he first encountered severe forms of discipline, and as such, the erotic fantasies he had earlier developed while incarcerated in Derendorf expanded to include graphic fantasies of his striking out at society and killing masses of people; these fantasies became ever more paramount and overbearing in his mind, and Kürten later claimed that he derived the "sort of pleasures from these visions that other people would get from thinking about a naked woman", adding that he occasionally spontaneously ejaculated while preoccupied with such thoughts.

== Murders ==
=== First murder ===
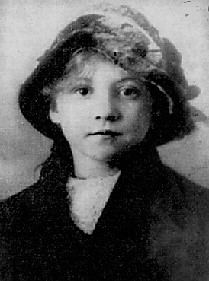
Christine Klein

The first murder Kürten definitively committed occurred on 25 May 1913. During the course of a burglary at a tavern in Köln-Mülheim, he encountered a nine-year-old girl named Christine Klein asleep in her bed "in a room above the inn". He would later recollect to investigators: "[The child's] head was facing the window. I seized it with my left hand and strangled her for about a minute and a half. The child woke up and struggled but lost consciousness [...] I had a small but sharp pocketknife with me and I held the child's head and cut her throat. I heard the blood spurt and drip [onto] the mat beside the bed. It spurted in an arch, right over my hand. The whole thing lasted about three minutes."

Kürten ejaculated as he heard the blood dripping from the two slash wounds he had inflicted to Klein's throat onto the floor by her bed and onto his hand. He then locked the door to the inn and returned to Düsseldorf.

The following day, Kürten specifically returned to Köln to drink in a tavern located directly opposite that in which he had murdered Klein, so that he could listen to the locals' reactions to the child's murder. He later recollected to investigators that he derived an extreme sense of gratification from the general disgust, repulsion, and outrage he had heard in the patrons' conversations. Moreover, in the weeks following Klein's funeral, Kürten occasionally travelled to Mülheim am Rhein to visit the child's grave, adding that when he handled the soil covering the grave, he spontaneously ejaculated.

Two months later—again in the course of committing a burglary with the aid of a skeleton key—Kürten broke into a home in Düsseldorf. Discovering a 17-year-old girl named Gertrud Franken asleep in her bed, Kürten manually strangled the girl, ejaculating at the sight of blood spouting from her mouth, before leaving the crime scene. Kürten managed to escape from the scene of this attempted murder and the earlier murder of Klein undetected.

=== Imprisonment and release ===
Just days after the attempted murder of Franken, on 14 July, Kürten was arrested for a series of arson attacks and burglaries. He was sentenced to six years imprisonment, although his repeated instances of insubordination, while imprisoned, saw his incarceration extended by a further two years. Kürten served this sentence in a military prison in the town of Brieg (then part of the German Empire).

Released in April 1921, Kürten relocated to Altenburg, where he initially lived with his sister. Through his sister, Kürten became acquainted with a woman three years his senior named Auguste Scharf, a sweet-shop proprietor and former prostitute who had previously been convicted of shooting her fiancé to death, and to whom Kürten initially posed as a former prisoner of war. Two years later, Kürten and Scharf married, and although the couple regularly engaged in sex, Kürten later claimed he could consummate his marriage only by fantasising about committing violence against another individual, and that, after their wedding night, he engaged in intercourse with his wife only at her invitation.

For the first time in his life, Kürten obtained regular employment, also becoming an active trades union official, although, with the exception of his wife, he formed no close friendships. In 1925, he returned with Scharf to Düsseldorf, where he soon began affairs with a servant girl named Tiede and a housemaid named Mech. Both women were frequently subjected to partial strangulation when they submitted to intercourse, with Tiede once being informed by Kürten, "That's what love means." When his wife discovered his infidelity, Tiede reported Kürten to police, claiming he had seduced her; Mech alleged Kürten had raped her. The more serious charge was later dropped, although Tiede's allegations were pursued, thus earning Kürten an eight-month prison sentence for attempted seduction and threatening behaviour. Kürten served six months of this sentence, with his early release being upon the condition he left Düsseldorf. He later successfully appealed the ruling that he relocate from the city.

== 1929 ==
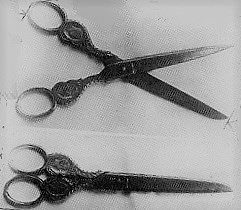
The scissors used by Peter Kürten in many of his murders and attempted murders

On 3 February 1929, Kürten stalked a middle-aged woman named Apollonia Kühn. Waiting until Kühn was shielded from the view of potential witnesses by bushes, Kürten pounced upon her, grabbing her by the lapels of her coat and shouting the words, "No row! Don't scream!" before dragging her into nearby undergrowth, where he proceeded to stab her 24 times with a sharpened pair of scissors. Although many of the blows were inflicted so deeply that the scissors struck her bones, Kühn survived her injuries.

On 8 February, Kürten strangled a nine-year-old girl named Rosa Ohliger into unconsciousness before stabbing her in the stomach, temple, genitals and heart with a pair of scissors, spontaneously ejaculating as he knifed the child. He then inserted his semen into her vagina with his fingers. Kürten then made a rudimentary effort to hide Ohliger's body by dragging it beneath a hedge before returning to the scene with a bottle of kerosene several hours later and setting the child's body alight, achieving an orgasm at the sight of the flames. Ohliger's body was found beneath a hedge the following day. Five days later, on 13 February, Kürten murdered a 45-year-old mechanic named Rudolf Scheer in the suburb of Flingern Nord, stabbing him twenty times, particularly about the head, back and eyes. Following the discovery of Scheer's body, Kürten returned to the scene of the murder to converse with police, falsely informing one detective he had heard about the murder via telephone.

Despite the differences in age and sex of these three victims, the fact that all three crimes had been committed in the Flingern district of Düsseldorf at dusk, that each victim had received a multitude of stab wounds likely inflicted in rapid succession and invariably involving at least one wound to the temple, plus the absence of a common motive such as robbery, led investigators to conclude the same perpetrator had committed all three attacks. Furthermore, the seemingly random selection of these victims led criminologists to remark as to the abnormal nature of the perpetrator.

Although Kürten did attempt to strangle four women between March and July 1929, one of whom he claimed to have thrown into the Rhine River, he is not known to have killed any further victims until 11 August when he raped, strangled, then repeatedly stabbed a young woman named Maria Hahn. Kürten had first encountered Hahn—whom he described as "a girl looking for marriage"—on 8 August, and had arranged to take her on a date to the Neandertal district of Düsseldorf the following Sunday. After several hours in Hahn's company, Kürten lured her into a meadow in order that he could kill her; he later claimed Hahn had repeatedly pleaded with him to spare her life as he alternately strangled her, stabbed her in the chest and head, or sat astride her body, waiting for her to die.

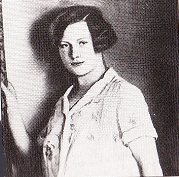
Maria Hahn

Hahn died approximately one hour after Kürten had begun attacking her. Fearful his wife might connect the bloodstains she had noted on his clothes with Hahn's murder, Kürten later buried her body in a cornfield, only to return to her body several weeks later with the intention of nailing her decomposing remains to a tree in a mock crucifixion to shock and disgust the public; however, Hahn's remains proved too heavy for Kürten to complete this act, and he simply returned her corpse to her grave before embracing and caressing the decomposing body as he lay beneath her remains. He then reburied Hahn's body. According to Kürten's later confession, both before and after he had attempted to impale Hahn's corpse to a tree, he "went to the grave many times and kept improving on it; and every time I thought of what was lying there and was filled with satisfaction." (Note: Kürten would later join an angry crowd which gathered to watch detectives unearthing Hahn's body.)

Three months after Kürten had murdered Hahn, he posted an anonymous letter to the police in which he confessed to the murder, adding that her remains had been buried in a field. In this letter, Kürten also drew a crude map describing the location of the remains. This letter would prove sufficiently detailed to enable investigators to locate Hahn's remains on 15 November.

Following the Hahn murder, Kürten changed his choice of weapon from scissors to a knife in an apparent effort to convince police more than one perpetrator was responsible for the unfolding crime spree. In the early morning of 21 August, he randomly stabbed an 18-year-old girl, a 30-year-old man, and a 37-year-old woman in separate attacks. All three were seriously wounded, and all stated to police their assailant had not spoken a word to them before he had attacked them.

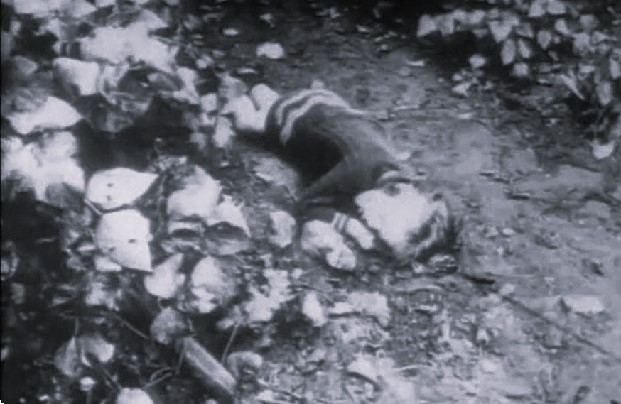
The body of Gertrude Hamacher, as discovered on 25 August 1929

On the evening of 24 August, at a fairground in the suburb of Flehe, Kürten observed two foster sisters (aged 5 and 14) walking from the fairground, through adjoining allotments, en route to their home. Sending the older girl, Luise Lenzen, on an errand to purchase four cigarettes from the fairground kiosk for him upon the promise of being given 20 pfennig, Kürten lifted the younger child, Gertrude Hamacher, off the ground by her neck and strangled her into unconsciousness before cutting her throat and discarding her body in a nearby patch of runner beans. When Lenzen returned to the scene, Kürten partially strangled her before stabbing her about the torso, with one wound piercing her aorta. He also bit and twice cut her throat before sucking blood from the wounds. Neither girl had been sexually assaulted, and the fact only Lenzen's footprints were found within seven meters of her body suggests she may have attempted to flee from her attacker before collapsing.

The following day, Kürten accosted a 27-year-old housemaid named Gertrude Schulte, whom he openly asked to engage in sex with him. Upon being rebuffed, Kürten shouted, "Well, die then!" before repeatedly stabbing the woman in the head, neck, shoulder, and back. Schulte survived her injuries, although she was unable to provide investigators with a clear description of her assailant, beyond assuming his age to be around 40.

Kürten attempted to murder two further victims—one by strangulation; another by stabbing—in September, before opting to predominantly use a hammer in his murders.

=== Hammer attacks ===
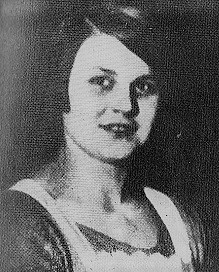
Elizabeth Dörrier

On the evening of 30 September, Kürten encountered a 31-year-old servant girl named Ida Reuter at Düsseldorf station. He successfully persuaded Reuter to accompany him to a café, and then for a walk through the local Hofgarten close to the Rhine River. At this location, he repeatedly struck her about the head with a hammer both before and after he had raped her. At one stage in this assault, Reuter regained consciousness and began pleading with Kürten to spare her life. In response, Kürten simply "gave her other hammer blows on the head and misused her".

Eleven days later, on 11 October, he encountered a 22-year-old servant girl named Elizabeth Dörrier outside a theatre. As had been the case with Reuter, Dörrier agreed to accompany Kürten for a drink at a café before the pair took a train to Grafenberg, to walk alongside the Kleine Düssel river. Here she was struck once across her right temple with a hammer, then raped. Kürten struck her repeatedly about the head and both temples with his hammer and left her for dead. Dörrier was found in a coma at 6:30 a.m. the following morning; she died from her injuries the following day. On 25 October, Kürten attacked two women with a hammer; both survived, although in the second instance, this may have been because Kürten's hammer broke in the attack.

On 7 November 1929, Kürten encountered a 5-year-old girl named Gertrude Albermann in the Flingern district of Düsseldorf; he persuaded the child to accompany him to a section of deserted allotments, where he seized her by the throat and strangled her, stabbing her once in the left temple with a pair of scissors as per his modus operandi. When Albermann "collapsed to the ground without a sound", Kürten stabbed the child 34 further times in the temple and chest before placing her body in a pile of nettles close to a factory wall.

== Investigation ==
By the late summer of 1929, the murders committed by the individual the press had dubbed "The Vampire of Düsseldorf" were receiving considerable national and international attention. Due to the sheer savagery of the murders, the diverse backgrounds of the victims, and the differing methods in which they had been assaulted and/or murdered, both the police and the press theorized the spate of assaults and murders were the work of more than one perpetrator. By the end of 1929, Düsseldorf police had received more than 13,000 letters from the public. With assistance from surrounding police forces, each lead was painstakingly pursued. As a result of this collective investigation into the killings, more than 9,000 individuals were interviewed, 2,650 other clues painstakingly pursued, and a list of 900,000 different names were compiled upon an official potential suspect list.

=== Correspondence ===
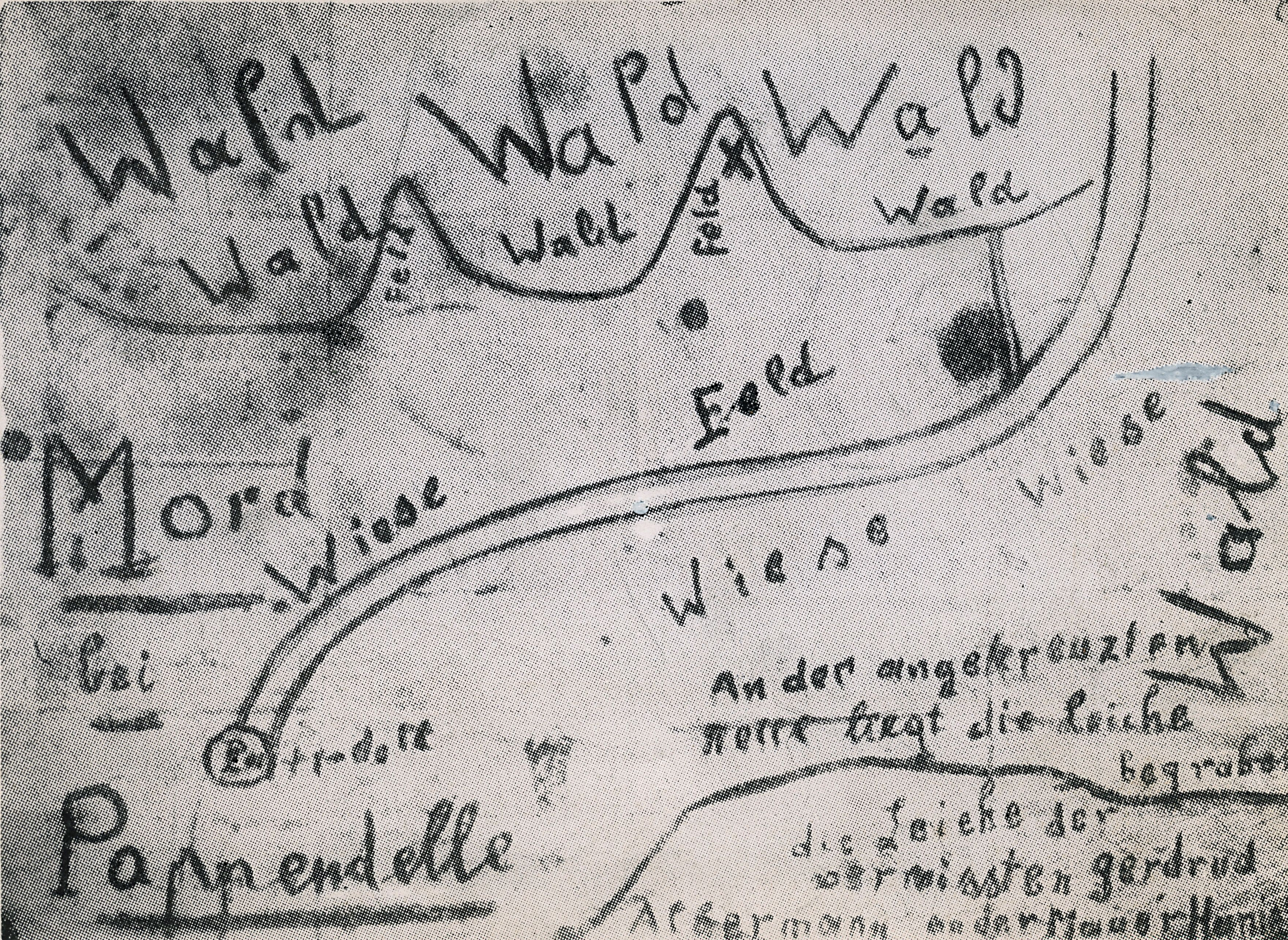
The hand-drawn map sent by Kürten depicting the location of the grave of Maria Hahn

Two days after the murder of Gertrude Albermann, a local communist newspaper received a map revealing the location of the grave of Maria Hahn. In this drawing, Kürten also revealed precisely where he had left Albermann's body (which had been found earlier that day), describing the exact position of her corpse, which he stated could be found face-down among bricks and rubble. An analysis of the handwriting revealed the author was the same individual who had anonymously informed police in a letter, dated 14 October, that he had killed Hahn and buried her body "at the edge of the woods". Each of the three letters Kürten had thus far sent to newspapers and police describing his exploits and threatening further assaults and murders were examined by a graphologist, who confirmed the same individual had written each letter, thus leading Ernst Gennat, chief inspector of the Berlin Police, to conclude that one man was responsible for most or all of the spate of assaults and murders.

=== 1930 ===
The murder of Gertrude Albermann proved to be Kürten's final fatal attack, although he did engage in a spate of non-fatal hammer attacks and attempted strangulations between February and May 1930, maiming ten victims in these assaults. All the victims survived and many were able to describe their attacker to the police.

On 14 May 1930, an unknown man approached a 20-year-old woman named Maria Budlick at Düsseldorf station. Discovering Budlick had travelled to Düsseldorf from Köln in search of lodgings and employment, he offered to direct her towards a local hostel. Budlick agreed to follow the man, although she became apprehensive when he attempted to lead her through a scarcely populated park. The pair began to argue, whereupon another man approached the two, asking whether Budlick was being pestered by her companion. When Budlick nodded, the man with whom she had been arguing simply walked away. The identity of the man who reportedly came to Budlick's aid was Peter Kürten.

Kürten invited the distressed young woman to his apartment on Mettmanner Straße to eat and drink before Budlick—correctly deducing the underlying motive for Kürten's hospitality—stated she was uninterested in engaging in sex with him. Kürten calmly agreed and offered to lead Budlick to a hotel, although he instead lured her into the Grafenburg Woods, where he seized her by the throat and attempted to strangle her as he raped her. When Budlick began to scream, Kürten released his grasp on her throat, before allowing her to leave.

Budlick did not report this assault to police, but described her ordeal in a letter to a friend, although she addressed the letter incorrectly. As such, the letter was opened at the post office by a clerk on 19 May. Upon reading the contents of the letter, this clerk forwarded the letter to the Düsseldorf police. This letter was read by Chief Inspector Gennat, who assumed there was a slim chance Budlick's assailant might be the Düsseldorf murderer. Gennat interviewed Budlick, who recounted her ordeal, further divulging one of the reasons Kürten had spared her was because she had falsely informed him she could not remember his address. She agreed to lead the police to Kürten's home, on Mettmanner Straße. When the landlady of the property let Budlick into the room of 71 Mettmanner Straße, Budlick confirmed to Gennat that this was the address of her assailant. The landlady confirmed to the chief inspector the tenant's name was Peter Kürten.

== Arrest and confession ==
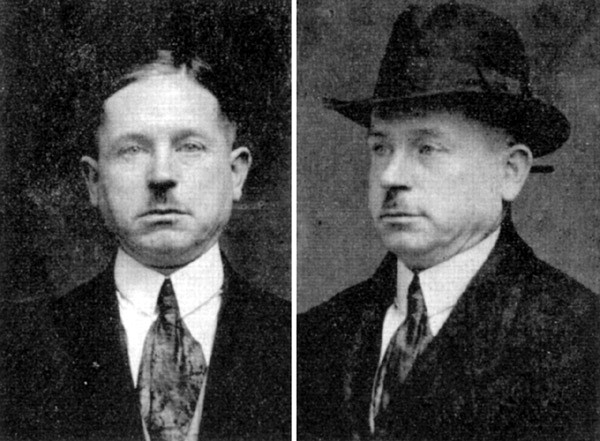
Mug shots of Kürten, taken after his May 1930 arrest

Although Kürten was not at home when Budlick and Gennat searched his property, he spotted the pair in the communal hallway and promptly left. Knowing that his identity was now known to the police and suspecting they may also have connected him to the crimes committed by the Vampire of Düsseldorf, Kürten confessed to his wife he had raped Budlick and that because of his previous convictions, he may receive fifteen years' penal labour. With his wife's consent, he found lodgings in the Adlerstraße district of Düsseldorf, and did not return to his own home until 23 May. Upon returning home, Kürten confessed to his wife he was the Vampire of Düsseldorf. He urged his wife to collect the substantial reward offered for his capture. (Note: Kürten's wife later received 4,000 Reichsmarks for her role in his capture.) Auguste Kürten contacted the police the following day. In the information provided to detectives, Kürten's wife explained that although she had known her husband had been repeatedly imprisoned in the past, she was unaware of his culpability in any murders. She then added that her husband had confessed to her his culpability in the Düsseldorf murders and that he was willing to likewise confess to the police. Furthermore, he was to meet her outside St. Rochus church later that day. That afternoon, Kürten was arrested at gunpoint.

Kürten freely admitted his guilt in all the crimes police had attributed to the Vampire of Düsseldorf, and further confessed he had committed the unsolved murder of Christine Klein and the attempted murder of Gertrud Franken in 1913. In total, Kürten confessed to 68 crimes including nine murders and 31 attempted murders. He made no attempt to excuse his crimes but justified them on the basis of what he saw as the injustices he had endured throughout his life. Nonetheless, he was adamant he had not tortured any of his child victims. Kürten also claimed to both investigators and psychiatrists that the sight of his victim's blood was, on many occasions, sufficient to bring him to orgasm, and that, on occasion, if he experienced ejaculation in the act of strangling a woman, he would immediately become apologetic to his victim, proclaiming, "That's what love is all about". He further claimed to have drunk the blood from the throat of one victim, from the temple of another, and to have licked the blood from a third victim's hands. In the Hahn murder, he had drunk so much blood from the neck wound that he had vomited. Kürten also claimed to have decapitated a swan in the spring of 1930 in order that he could drink the blood from the animal's neck, achieving ejaculation in the process.

=== Psychological study ===
As Kürten awaited his trial, then later as he awaited his execution, he was extensively interviewed by Karl Berg. In these interviews, Kürten stated to Berg that his primary motive in committing any form of criminal activity was one of sexual pleasure, and that he had begun to associate sexual excitement with violent acts and the sight of blood via indulging in both day-dreams and masturbation fantasies — particularly when he had been isolated from human contact. The majority of his assaults and murders had been committed when his wife had been working evenings, and the number of stab or bludgeoning wounds Kürten inflicted upon each victim had varied depending upon the length of time it had taken him to achieve an orgasm. Furthermore, the sight of his victim's blood had been integral to his sexual stimulation. Kürten further elaborated to Berg that once he had committed an attack or murder, the feeling of tension he experienced before the commission of the crime would be superseded by one of relief.

In reference to the choice of weapon used in his attacks, Kürten stressed that although he had changed his method of attack to deceive investigators into believing they were seeking more than one perpetrator, the weapon he used was inconsequential to his ultimate objective of seeing his victim's blood. Elaborating, Kürten stated: "Whether I took a knife or a pair of scissors or a hammer in order to see blood was a matter of indifference to me or mere chance. Often after the hammer blows the bleeding victims moved and struggled, just as they did when they were throttled." Kürten further confided that although he had occasionally penetrated his female victims, he had only done so to feign the act of coitus as a motive for his crimes. He also confessed that many of his later strangulation victims had only survived his attacks because he had achieved an orgasm in the early throes of the assault.

However, Kürten contradicted these claims by proclaiming to both Berg and legal examiners that his primary motive in all his criminal activities was to both "strike back at [an] oppressive society" for what he considered the injustice of his being repeatedly incarcerated throughout his life, and as a form of revenge for the neglect and abuse he had endured as a child. These desires had fermented in his mind throughout the long periods he had been in solitary confinement for various forms of insubordination, and Kürten explained that he deliberately broke minor prison rules as a means of guaranteeing that he would be sentenced to solitary confinement in order that he could indulge in these psychosexual fantasies. To Berg and the legal examiners, Kürten did not deny that he had sexually molested his female victims, or to have stroked or digitally penetrated their genitals as he stabbed, slashed, strangled or bludgeoned their bodies, although throughout his trial Kürten consistently claimed the sexual assault of his victims was not his primary motive. Both Berg and other psychologists concluded Kürten was not insane, was fully able to control his actions, and appreciated the criminality of his conduct. Each ruled Kürten was legally sane and competent to stand trial. (Note: In modern psychological parlance, Kürten's behaviour exhibits traits typical of a sexually motivated psychopath.)

== Trial ==
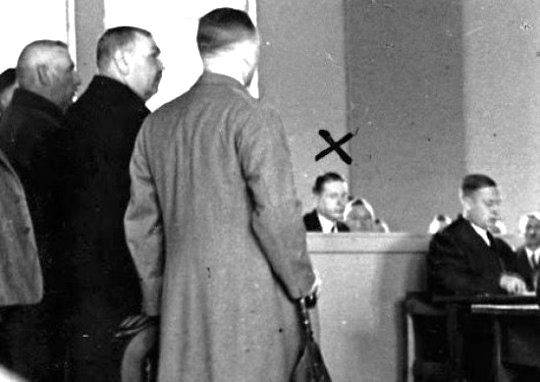
Kürten (below hand drawn' ×'), pictured at his trial in April 1931

On 13 April 1931, Kürten stood trial in Düsseldorf. He was charged with nine counts of murder and seven of attempted murder, and was tried before Presiding Judge Rose. Kürten pleaded not guilty by reason of insanity to each of the charges. Aside from when delivering testimony, Kürten would spend the duration of his trial surrounded by a heavily guarded shoulder-high iron cage specifically constructed to protect him from attack by the enraged relatives of his victims, and his feet were shackled whenever he was inside this cage.

Proceedings began with the prosecution formally reciting each of the charges against Kürten before they recited the formal confession he had provided to police following his arrest. When then asked by the presiding judge to describe why he had continued to commit acts of arson throughout 1929 and 1930, Kürten explained: "When my desire for injuring people awoke, the love of setting fire to things awoke as well. The sight of the flames excited me, but above all, it was the excitement of the attempts to extinguish the fire and the agitation of those who saw their property being destroyed."

Having first claimed that his initial confession had been simply to allow his wife to recoup the reward money offered for the capture of the Düsseldorf Vampire, several days into his trial, Kürten instructed his defence attorney that he wished to change his plea to one of guilty. Addressing the court, Kürten proclaimed: "I have no remorse. As to whether recollection of my deeds makes me feel ashamed, I will tell you [that] thinking back to all the details is not at all unpleasant. I rather enjoy it." Further pressed as to whether he considered himself to possess a conscience, Kürten stated he did not. Nonetheless, when pressed as to his motivation in confessing, Kürten reiterated: "Why don't you understand that I am fond of my wife, and that I am still fond of her? I have done many wrongs; have been unfaithful over and over again. My wife has never done any wrong. Even when she heard of the many prison sentences I have served, she said: 'I won't let you down, otherwise you'll be lost altogether.' I wanted to fix for my wife a carefree old age."

To counteract Kürten's insanity defence, the prosecution introduced five eminent doctors and psychiatrists to testify; each testified that Kürten was legally sane and had been in control of his actions and impulses at all times. Typical of the testimony delivered by these experts was that of Franz Sioli, who testified as to Kürten's motivation in his crimes being the desire to achieve the sexual gratification he demanded, and that this satisfaction could only be achieved by acts of brutality, violence and Kürten's knowledge of the pain and misery his actions caused to others. Berg testified that Kürten's motive in committing murder and attempted murder was 90 per cent sadism, and 10 per cent revenge relating to his perceived sense of injustice for both the neglect and abuse he had endured both as a child and the discipline he endured while incarcerated. Moreover, Berg stated that despite Kürten's admission to having embraced and digitally penetrated the corpse of Maria Hahn, and to have spontaneously ejaculated while holding the soil covering the coffin of Christine Klein, his conclusion was that Kürten was not a necrophiliac.

Further evidence of Kürten's awareness was referenced by the premeditated nature of his crimes, his ability to abandon an attack if he sensed a risk of being disturbed, and his acute memory of both his crimes and their chronological detail. Also disclosed in the first week of the trial were the deaths of the two boys whom Kürten had confessed to drowning at the age of nine, with the prosecution suggesting these deaths indicated Kürten had displayed a homicidal propensity dating much earlier than 1913. However, this view was disputed by medical witnesses, who suggested that although indicative of inherent depravity, these two deaths should not be compared to Kürten's later murders as, to a child, the death of a friend can be seen as nothing more than an inconsequential passing. (Note: Kürten was never tried for the murders of the two boys he claimed to have drowned at age nine due to a lack of evidence, although contemporary death records dating from early 1893 existed to substantiate his claims.)

Upon cross-examination, Kürten's defence attorney, Alex Wehner, challenged these experts' conclusions, arguing the sheer range of perversions his client had engaged in was tantamount to insanity; however, each doctor and psychiatrist remained adamant as to Kürten being legally sane and responsible for his actions. (Note: To support his contention Kürten fit the legal definition of insanity, Wehner described his client as being "the king of sexual delinquents, because he unites nearly all perversions in one person".)

"I have none. Never have I felt any misgiving in my soul; never did I think to myself that what I did was bad, even though human society condemns it. My blood and the blood of my victims must be on the heads of my torturers ... The punishments I have suffered have destroyed all my feelings as a human being. That was why I had no pity for my victims."
Peter Kürten, responding to the presiding judge's question as to whether he possessed a conscience at his trial (1931)

In a further attempt to discredit the validity of many of the charges recited at the opening stages of the trial, Wehner also questioned whether the occasional physical inaccuracies of the crimes described in his client's confession equated to Kürten having fabricated at least some of the crimes, thus supporting his contention Kürten possessed a diseased mind. In response, Berg conceded that sections of Kürten's confessions were false, but argued that the knowledge he possessed of the murder scenes and the wounds inflicted upon the victims left him in no doubt as to his guilt, and that the minor embellishments in his confessions could be attributed to Kürten's narcissistic personality.

=== Conviction ===
The trial lasted ten days. On 22 April, the jury retired to consider their verdict. They deliberated for under two hours before reaching their verdict: Kürten was found guilty and sentenced to death on nine counts of murder. He was also found guilty of seven counts of attempted murder. Kürten displayed no emotion as the sentence was passed, although in his final address to the court, he stated that he now saw his crimes as being "so ghastly that [he did] not want to make any sort of excuse for them".

Kürten did not lodge an appeal of his conviction, although he submitted a petition for pardon to the Minister of Justice, who was a known opponent of capital punishment. The petition was formally rejected on 1 July. Kürten remained composed upon receipt of this news, and asked for permission to see his confessor, to write letters of apology to the relatives of his victims, and a final farewell letter to his wife. All of these requests were granted.

== Execution ==
On the evening of 1 July 1931, Kürten received his last meal. He ordered Wiener schnitzel, a bottle of white wine, and fried potatoes. Kürten ate the entire meal before requesting a second helping. The prison staff decided to grant his request.

At 06:00 on 2 July, Kürten was beheaded via guillotine in the grounds of Klingelpütz Prison, Cologne. His executioner was Carl Gröpler. He walked unassisted to the guillotine, flanked by the prison psychiatrist and a priest.

Shortly before his head was placed on the guillotine, Kürten turned to the prison psychiatrist and asked the question: "Tell me ... after my head is chopped off, will I still be able to hear, at least for a moment, the sound of my own blood gushing from the stump of my neck? That would be the pleasure to end all pleasures." When asked whether he had any last words to say, Kürten simply smiled and replied, "No".

== Aftermath ==
Following Kürten's 1931 execution, his head was bisected and mummified; the brain was removed and subjected to forensic analysis in an attempt to explain his personality and behaviour. The examinations of Kürten's brain revealed no abnormalities. The autopsy conducted upon Kürten's body revealed that, aside from his having an enlarged thymus gland, Kürten had not been suffering any physical abnormality.

The interviews Kürten granted to Karl Berg in 1930 and 1931 were the first psychological study of a sexual serial killer. The interviews formed the basis of Berg's book, The Sadist.

Shortly after the Second World War, Kürten's head was taken to the United States. It is currently on display at the Ripley's Believe It or Not! museum in Wisconsin Dells, Wisconsin.

== Media ==
=== Film ===
- The first film to draw inspiration from the murders committed by Peter Kürten, M, was released in May 1931. Directed by Fritz Lang, M starred Peter Lorre as a fictional child killer named Hans Beckert. In addition to drawing inspiration from the case of Peter Kürten, M was also inspired by the then-recent and notorious crimes of Fritz Haarmann and Carl Großmann.
- An American remake of M was released in March 1951. Directly inspired by the 1931 film of the same name, this remake was directed by Joseph Losey, and stars David Wayne as the child killer, renamed Martin Harrow.
- The 1965 thriller Le Vampire de Düsseldorf (The Vampire of Düsseldorf) is based on the case of Peter Kürten. Directed by Robert Hossein (who also cast himself as Peter Kürten), the film also stars Marie-France Pisier.
- The 2009 film Normal is based on the crimes of Peter Kürten. Directed by Julius Ševčík, Normal is a film adaptation of playwright Anthony Neilson's Normal: The Düsseldorf Ripper. The film stars Milan Kňažko as Kürten, and is portrayed from the point of view of his defence lawyer.

=== Books ===
- Berg, Karl (2022) [1938]. The Sadist. London: Broadway Press. pp. 159–289. ISBN 978-9-333-35227-7.
- Berg, Karl; Godwin, George (1937). Monsters of Weimar: Kürten, the Vampire of Düsseldorf. London: Nemesis Books. ISBN 1-897743-10-6.
- Berg, Karl; Godwin, George (1993) [1937]. Monsters of Weimar: Kürten, the Vampire of Düsseldorf. London: Nemesis Books. pp. 159–289. ISBN 978-1-897-74310-2.
- Cawthorne, Nigel; Tibballs, Geoff (1993). Killers: The Ruthless Exponents of Murder. London: Boxtree Limited. pp. 386–389. ISBN 0-7522-0850-0.
- Godwin, George (1945) [1938]. Peter Kürten: A Study In Sadism. London: Acorn. ASIN B00191ENHA.
- Hall, Angus (1976). Crimes of Horror. London: Hamlyn Publishing. pp. 132–141. ISBN 1-85051-170-5.
- Lane, Bran (1993). "The Vampire of Düsseldorf". Real-Life Crimes. No. 26. London, England: Eaglemoss Publications Ltd. ISBN 978-1-856-29960-2.
- Lloyd, Georgina (1993) [1986]. One Was Not Enough. Reading, Berkshire: Bantam Books. pp. 106–119. ISBN 0-553-17605-6.
- Swinney, C.L. (2016). Monster: The True Story of Serial Killer Peter Kürten. Newfoundland: RJ Parker Publishing. ISBN 978-1-987-90215-0.
- Wagner, Margaret Seaton (1972) [1932]. The Monster of Düsseldorf: The Life and Trial of Peter Kürten. London: Faber & Faber. ISBN 978-0-598-79711-7.
- Wynn, Douglas (1996). On Trial for Murder. London: Pan Books. pp. 53–55. ISBN 978-0-330-33947-6.

=== Theatre ===
- Normal: The Düsseldorf Ripper is a play focusing on the case of Peter Kürten. Scripted by Anthony Neilson, the play was first performed at Edinburgh's Pleasance Theatre in August 1991. Normal: The Düsseldorf Ripper has since become the inspiration for one film.

=== Television ===
- The BBC commissioned a documentary on the murders committed by Peter Kürten. This documentary, Profiles of the Criminal Mind, largely focuses on the forensic profiling of Kürten's crimes, and was first broadcast in 2001.

== See also ==
- Capital punishment in Germany
- List of German serial killers
- List of serial killers by number of victims

== Cited works and further reading ==
- Berry-Dee, Christopher (2011). Cannibal Serial Killers: Profiles of Depraved Flesh-eating Murderers. San Francisco: Ulysses Press. pp. 159–289. ISBN 978-1-569-75902-8.
- Blundell, Nigel (1996). Encyclopedia of Serial Killers. London: PRC. pp. 105–107. ISBN 1-856-48328-2.
- Cummins, Joseph S. (2001). Cannibals: Shocking True Tales of the Last Taboo on Land and at Sea. London: Lyons Press. ISBN 978-1-422-35153-6.
- Elder, Sace (2010). Murder Scenes: Normality, Deviance, and Criminal Violence in Weimar Berlin. Ann Arbor: University of Michigan Press. ISBN 978-1-422-35153-6.
- Foreman, Laura (1992). Serial Killers: True Crime. Virginia: Time-Life Books. pp. 96–97. ISBN 978-0-7835-0001-0.
- Karunaratne, Professor Vidanage (2015). An In-depth Analysis of the True Living Vampires of the Modern Era. WSIC EBooks Ltd. ISBN 978-1-927-52688-0.
- Lane, Brian; Gregg, Wilfred (1995) [1992]. The Encyclopedia Of Serial Killers. London: Headline Book Publishing. pp. 244–247. ISBN 978-0-747-23731-0.
- Nash, Jay Robert (2004). The Great Pictorial History of World Crime, Volume 2. London: Bloomsbury Publishing. ISBN 978-1-461-71215-2.
- Parmentier, Hanno (2013). Der Würger von Düsseldorf: Leben und Taten des Serienmörders Peter Kürten. Stroud: Sutton Publishing Ltd. ISBN 978-3-954-00178-1.
- Philbin, Tom; Philbin, Michael (2009). The Killer Book of Serial Killers: Incredible Stories, Facts and Trivia from the World of Serial Killers. Illinois: Sourcebooks, Inc. ISBN 978-1-402-24162-8.
- Ramsland, Katherine (2011). The Mind of a Murderer: Privileged Access to the Demons that Drive Extreme Violence. Santa Barbara: Praeger Publishing. ISBN 978-0-313-38672-5.
- Rhodes, Henry Taylor Fowkes (1937). The Criminals We Deserve: A Survey of Some Aspects of Crime in the Modern World. New York: Oxford University Press. ASIN B002EG69OO.
- Wetzell, Richard F. (2014). Crime and Criminal Justice in Modern Germany. New York: Berghahn Books. ISBN 978-1-782-38247-8.
- Whittington-Egan, Richard; Whittington-Egan, Molly (1992). The Murder Almanac. Glasgow: Neil Wilson Publishing Ltd. pp. 102–103. ISBN 1-897784-04-X.
- Wilson, Colin; Wilson, Richard (2006). The World's Most Evil Murderers: Real-Life Stories of Infamous Killers. Bath: Paragon Publishing. ISBN 978-1-405-48828-0.
- Wilson, Colin; Wilson, Damon; Wilson, Rowan (1993). World Famous Murders. London: Parragon. pp. 389–394. ISBN 978-0-752-50122-2.
