= Normal: The Düsseldorf Ripper =

Play written by Anthony Neilson

Normal
- Cover of Anthony Neilson Plays: 1, which features the published script of Normal
- Original language: English
- Written by: Anthony Neilson
- Characters: Justus Wehner; Peter Kurten; Frau Kurten
- Genre: In-yer-face theatre

Premiere
- Date: 7 August 1991
- Place: Pleasance Theatre, Edinburgh

Normal (full title Normal: The Düsseldorf Ripper) is Anthony Neilson's fictional account of Peter Kürten's life, told from the point of view of his lawyer. It is considered to be Neilson's breakthrough play.

The play was first performed at the Pleasance Theatre, Edinburgh on 7 August 1991 and transferred to the Finborough Theatre, London on 1 October 1991. It was directed by Anthony Neilson and designed by Michael T. Roberts. It was revived at Styx, London in 2017, with Emma Baggott directing.

Normal was published in Neilson Plays 1: Normal, Penetrator, Year of the Family, Night Before Christmas, Censor, Methuen Drama 1998, ISBN 978-0-413-72460-1.

In 2009 it was adapted into the Czech film Angels Gone.
