= You'll Have Had Your Hole =

Stageplay by Irvine Welsh

You’ll Have Had Your Hole
- Written by: Irvine Welsh
- Genre: in-yer-face theatre

Premiere
- Date: February 1998
- Place: West Yorkshire Playhouse, Leeds.

You’ll Have Had Your Hole is an in-yer-face stage play by Irvine Welsh. It is Welsh's first original play as his previous theatre pieces had been theatrical versions of his literary works, which had been adapted for the stage by other dramatists.

It premiered in February 1998 at the West Yorkshire Playhouse, Leeds before embarking on an international tour. The production was directed by Ian Brown who had previously directed Harry Gibson's successful stage adaptation of Welsh's novel Trainspotting.

== Title meaning ==
The title, "You'll Have Had Your Hole", is a play on the expression "You'll have had your tea", a joke about Edinburgh's middle class supposed attitudes, implying a tightness in a host's attitude towards a guest. It means, "You're getting nothing for free here". The phrase 'get your hole' is slang for having sex.

== Reception ==
The first production of You’ll Have Had Your Hole in February 1998 by the West Yorkshire Playhouse was met with largely negative reviews. Robert Butler wrote in The Independent, “the Trainspotting author goes so far out his way to taunt us that one recoils from recoiling. He wants us to have a bad time”. Charles Spencer began in the Daily Telegraph, “The competition is undoubtedly strong but this is, I believe, the most obnoxious and contemptible play I have ever sat through”. Robert Gore-Langton in Express on Sunday concludes his review with, “I don’t know what Welsh’s message to us is, but mine to him is this: see a shrink or change your prescription”. Much of the critical antipathy centered on the character of Laney, whom many critics called misogynistic, and Welsh's use of elements of the romance formula alongside graphic violence. Welsh said he was not concerned about the negative reviews as he was "working on the premise that condemnation from the out-of-touch is as valid an endorsement as praise from the hip".
