= Normal (2009 film) =

Angels Gone
- Czech theatrical poster
- Directed by: Julius Ševčík
- Written by: Anthony Neilson (play); Julius Ševčík
- Produced by: Karla Stojáková
- Starring: Milan Kňažko; Pavel Gajdoš; Dagmar Veškrnová; Miroslav Táborský
- Cinematography: Antonio Riestra https://en.wikipedia.org/wiki/Antonio_Riestra
- Edited by: Marek Opatrný
- Music by: Jan P. Muchow
- Distributed by: Bontonfilm
- Release date: 26 March 2009
- Running time: 100 minutes
- Country: Czech Republic
- Language: Czech

Normal (also known as Angels Gone) is a 2009 Czech thriller film directed by Julius Ševčík. It is an adaptation of the playwright Anthony Neilson's 1991 work Normal: The Düsseldorf Ripper, a fictional account of the life of serial killer Peter Kürten, told from the point of view of his defense lawyer.

== Cast ==
- Milan Kňažko as Kürten
- Dagmar Veškrnová as Marie Kürten
- Pavel Gajdoš as Lawyer Dr. Justus Wehner
- Miroslav Táborský as Klein
- Jan Vlasák as Wenge
- Zuzana Kajnarová as Receptionist
- Meto Jovanovski as Judge

== Release ==
The film was released in the Czech Republic on 26 March 2009.
