= Shopping and Fucking =

1996 play by English playwright Mark Ravenhill

- Original language: English
- Written by: Mark Ravenhill
- Characters: Lulu; Robbie; Mark; Gary; Brian
- Genre: In-yer-face theatre

Premiere
- Date: 26 September 1996
- Place: Royal Court Theatre Upstairs, London

Shopping and Fucking (sometimes billed as Shopping and F**king) is a 1996 play by British playwright Mark Ravenhill. It was Ravenhill's first full-length play. It received its first public reading at the Finborough Theatre, London, in 1995. It was performed in 1996 at the Royal Court Upstairs (located temporarily at the Ambassadors Theatre in London's West End), before embarking on a national and international tour, co-produced by Out of Joint and the Royal Court Theatre.

When first produced, Shopping and Fucking received mixed reviews. Some were shocked by the play's sexually violent content, which includes the pseudo-rape of an underage male by other males. Other critics were drawn to the play's black humour, and its mixture of Sadean and Marxist philosophies. Along with Sarah Kane's Blasted, it was a prime exemplar of British in-yer-face theatre of the 1990s.

== Central themes ==
The sexual violence of Shopping and Fucking explores what is possible if consumerism supersedes all other moral codes. To this effect everything, including sex, violence and drugs, is reduced to a mere transaction in an age where shopping centres are the new cathedrals of Western consumerism.

Aspects of consumerism and sexuality rampant in popular culture recur throughout the play: drugs, shoplifting, phone sex, prostitution, anal sex and oral sex in the London department store Harvey Nichols.

The characters' names (Mark, Robbie and Gary) are taken from the Manchester boy band Take That, and from the singer Lulu who collaborated with them on their hit single Relight My Fire.

== Theatrical productions ==
- Beginning 4 February 1998 International Tour – starring Ashley Artus, Stephen Beresford, Charlie Condou, Karina Fernandez and Ian Redford.
- 2 February 1998 – 17 March 1998 – New York Theatre Workshop. Directed by Gemma Bodinetz and Max Stafford-Clark. Torquil Campbell as Gary, Philip Seymour Hoffman as Mark, Jennifer Dundas Lowe as Lulu, Matthew Sussman as Brian and Justin Theroux as Robbie.
- 20–21 May 2013 – The Victoria, Swindon. Directed by Peter Hynds and Sarah Lewis. Produced by TS Theatre Productions. This production starred Ella Thomas as Lulu, David Paris Malham as Robbie, Pete Hynds as Mark, David John Phillips as Gary and Howard Trigg as Brian.
- 7 October-5 November 2016 – Lyric Hammersmith. Directed by Sean Holmes. Alphabetically, this production starred Alex Arnold as Robbie, Ashley McGuire as Brian, David Moorst as Gary, Sam Spruell as Mark and Sophie Wu as Lulu.
- 20–25 April 2021 – MC Showroom, Melbourne, Australia. Directed by Tyrone Cross. Starring Sid Bobbin as Gary, Riley Nottingham as Mark, Rosie Ochtman as Lulu, Mith Saseetharan as Brian, Carter Smith as Robbie.
