= Rainbow Kiss =

Play by Simon Farquhar

Rainbow Kiss is a play by Simon Farquhar, a Scottish writer. The script is published by Oberon Books.

== London production ==
It was first staged at the Royal Court Upstairs in London in April 2006, having been chosen to occupy the theatre's 50th Anniversary slot. The production starred Joseph McFadden, Dawn Steele, Clive Russell and Graham McTavish, and was directed by actor and director Richard Wilson.

=== Reviews ===
A "dazzling Royal Court debut" wrote Michael Billington in The Guardian. "What makes the play so impressive is Farquhar's portrait of the grimness behind Aberdeen's oil-fuelled boom. This is not just another sex'n'violence play: what it grippingly shows is the disastrous effect of a money-mad materialist culture on society's marginalised no-hopers." On the other hand, Charles Spencer in The Daily Telegraph panned the play, calling Rainbow Kiss "the archetypal Royal Court play, almost indistinguishable from all the others we have seen since the arrival of the "in-yer-face" school of theatre a decade or more ago", although he asserted Farquahar "betrays flickers of real talent". Paul Taylor of The Independent agreed with Spencer that the play was a throwback to the In-yer-face theatre of the late 1990s.

== Later productions ==
The play began previews for a limited run in New York at 59E59 Theaters on 12 March 2008 with a press opening scheduled for 22 March 2008. A production of The Play Company, it stars Michael Cates, Robert Hogan, Charlotte Parry, and Peter Scanavino and is directed by Will Frears. A production in Rome opened in October 2009.
