= Penetrator (play) =

1993 play written by Anthony Neilson

- Written by: Anthony Neilson
- Characters: Tadge; Max; Adam
- Original language: English
- Genre: In-yer-face theatre

Premiere
- Date premiered: 12 August 1993
- Place premiered: Traverse Theatre, Edinburgh

Penetrator is a 1993 play by Scottish playwright Anthony Neilson. The play was first performed at the Traverse Theatre, Edinburgh, on 12 August 1993. It transferred to the Finborough Theatre, London, later that year, and subsequently at the Royal Court Theatre Upstairs, London, on 12 January 1994. It was directed by Anthony Neilson and designed by Michael T. Roberts. It is considered one of the earliest examples of in-yer-face theatre.

== Plot ==
Two friends, 20-somethings Max and Alan are alone, when Tadge, their old school friend from grade school returns from his service in the Gulf War. Tadge's experiences in the military have changed him, and he is no longer the person they once knew.

== Reception ==
A production staged at the upstairs Royal Court Theatre received a generally negative review from Paul Taylor in The Independent.
