= The Debt Collector (1999 film) =

1999 film by Anthony Neilson

- DVD Cover
- Directed by: Anthony Neilson
- Written by: Anthony Neilson
- Produced by: Damian Jones; Graham Broadbent
- Starring: Billy Connolly; Ken Stott; Francesca Annis
- Cinematography: Dick Pope
- Edited by: John Wilson
- Music by: Adrian Johnston
- Release date: 25 June 1999
- Running time: 109 minutes
- Country: United Kingdom
- Language: English

The Debt Collector is a 1999 thriller, written and directed by Scottish dramatist Anthony Neilson and starring Billy Connolly, Ken Stott and Francesca Annis.

Loosely based on the character of Jimmy Boyle, The Debt Collector explores themes of forgiveness, revenge, change and the macho culture of modern urban Scottish life.

== Plot ==
In late 1970s Edinburgh, Nicky Dryden is arrested by Gary Keltie for enforcing the collection of money owed to a loan shark.

In the present day, Dryden has left prison and changed his ways. He is now a feted sculptor displaying his first show and married to journalist Val. The show is interrupted by Keltie who is disgusted by Dryden's new-found respectability, and claims that he hasn't paid his debt to society. Dryden wants to move on from his past crimes, but Keltie is determined not to let him forget his past. Val is disturbed when Dryden confesses to her that his "policy" (modus operandi) during his criminal days was to intimidate debtors by assaulting their close relatives.

Young wannabe gangster Flipper is obsessed by Dryden's dark past and wishes to emulate him. His low level crimes escalate to the murder of a security guard at a swimming pool.

Keltie harasses Dryden and his family, including disrupting a family wedding. When Dryden's stepson is murdered and Keltie shows up at the funeral, Dryden seeks revenge. He contacts an old underworld colleagues who arranges for Flipper to attack Keltie. Flipper, however, imitates Dryden's "policy" by attacking Keltie's elderly mother, and boasts about it to Dryden. Disgusted, Dryden attacks Flipper, killing him.

Keltie breaks into Dryden's home to attack Dryden, but Dryden is at the Edinburgh Tattoo, and Keltie instead rapes Val.

Keltie and Dryden eventually meet, and in a fight outside Edinburgh Castle Dryden kills Keltie.

Dryden is acquitted of the murder of Keltie, but he is a broken man, disabled in the fight, his marriage ended, and he is once again estranged from society. Keltie's mother is placed in a nursing home.

== Filming locations ==
Although predominantly set in Edinburgh, much of the film was filmed in Glasgow as part of the condition of the Glasgow Film Fund. and some shot in Edinburgh.

== Cast ==
- Billy Connolly as Nicky Dryden
- Ken Stott as Gary Keltie
- Francesca Annis as Val Dryden
- Iain Robertson as "Flipper"
- Annette Crosbie as Lana Keltie
- Alastair Galbraith as Colquhoun
- Shauna Macdonald as Catriona
- Sandy Neilson as Duncan
- Jimmy Logan as Mr. Dryden
- Ronni Ancona as Miss Dryden
- Ford Kiernan as Janitor

== Awards ==
The film won the FIPRESCI prize at the Troia Film Festival.
