= In-yer-face theatre =

Style of drama

In-yer-face theatre is a term used to describe a confrontational style and sensibility of British drama that emerged in the 1990s. This term was borrowed by British theatre critic Aleks Sierz as the title of his book, In-Yer-Face Theatre: British Drama Today, first published by Faber and Faber in March 2001.

An adjunct faculty member in Boston University's London graduate journalism programme, and co-editor of TheatreVoic, Sierz uses in-yer-face theatre to describe work by young playwrights who present vulgar, shocking, and confrontational material on stage as a means of involving and affecting their audiences.

== Etymology ==
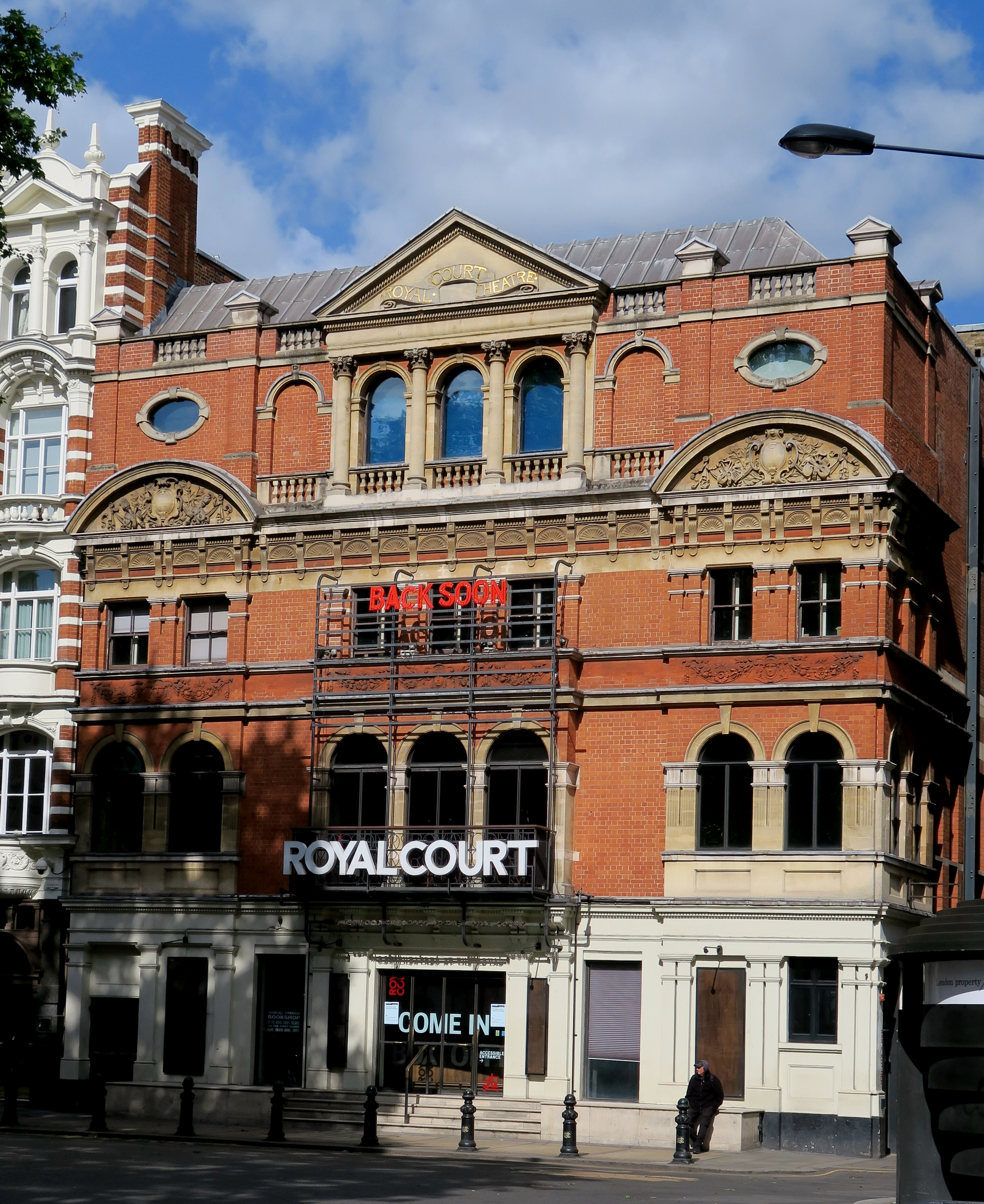
The Royal Court Theatre

With respect to "in-your-face", Aleks Sierz wrote:

The sanitized phrase 'in-your-face' is defined by the New Oxford English Dictionary (1998) as something 'blatantly aggressive or provocative, impossible to ignore or avoid'. The Collins English Dictionary (1998) adds the adjective 'confrontational'. 'In-your-face' originated in American sports journalism during the mid-1970s as an exclamation of derision or contempt, and gradually seeped into more mainstream slang during the late 1980s and 1990s, meaning 'aggressive, provocative, brash'. It implies being forced to see something close up, having your personal space invaded. It suggests the crossing of normal boundaries.

Sierz has been mistakenly cited as coining the term "In-yer-face theatre", saying that "Although I certainly was the first to describe, celebrate and theorise this kind of new writing, which emerged decisively in the mid-1990s, I certainly did not invent the phrase." In his piece A brief history of in-yer-face theatre, Sierz outlines a number of instances where the phrase was used directly or indirectly by others prior to him popularising the label.

In 1994 Paul Taylor, in his review of Philip Ridley's Ghost from a Perfect Place, described the violent girl gang in the play as "the in-yer-face castrating trio".

In response to Trainspotting being performed at the Bush Theatre, critic Charles Spencer wrote that "You may not like these in-your-face productions; but they are quite impossible to ignore." Later that year when the play transferred to the West End, The Times's Jeremy Kingston remarked that the previous two productions of the play had brought "actors within inches of the audience, and such in-yer-face realism".

During an interview in November 1995 the playwright Anthony Neilson remarked that "I think that in-your-face theatre is coming back — and that is good." Sierz has stated that "As far as I know, this seems to be the very first coinage of the term "in-your-face theatre"."

About a month after this interview the critic Ian Herbert started using the phrase "in-yer-face" in various columns of the publication Theatre Record, for which he was the editor. Sierz remarked that Herbert "chose the more direct "in-yer-face" formulation over the more staid "in-your-face"". After Herbert's writings in Theatre Record the phrase began to be used by other critics and, according to Sierz, "By the time Mark Ravenhill's Shopping and Fucking opened at the Royal Court in October 1996, the expression was spreading rapidly".

Sierz has stated that "the idea of writing a book about in-yer-face theatre was originally Ian Herbert's" as he originally spoke about the concept to Peggy Butcher, who was the drama editor of Faber and Faber. Herbert also decided to name the book 'In-Yer-Face Theatre' and was asked by Butcher to write an outline for it. However, Herbert was unable to provide an outline, jokingly stating that "I realised that [writing] a book would mean actual work, something to which I am not accustomed." Sierz however states that Herbert "was too busy to embark on a book" due to his many work commitments. As a result Herbert pulled out of writing the book and told Butcher that it should be written by Sierz instead because his "interest in new writing at the time made [him] an obvious candidate for the job". Early during the development of the book Sierz considered renaming it to Cool Britannia but Sierz says that this was vetoed by Butcher "on the grounds that in a couple of years no one would have any respect for that label - and how right she was." Sierz finished writing the book in January 2000, and it was published by Faber and Faber in March 2001 under the title In-Yer-Face Theatre: British Drama Today.

== History ==
=== Aleks Sierz's 'five mighty moments' ===
In his lecture entitled Blasted and After: New Writing in British Theatre Today Sierz cites "five mighty moments in the history of the 1990s" that shaped in-yer-face theatre. Outside of this lecture Sierz has gone into greater detail about the importance of these moments:

==== The influence of North American plays and Scottish theatre ====
Sierz first cites Ian Brown, artistic director of Edinburgh's Traverse Theatre, who during the late 1980s started looking "for provocative plays from Canada and America" to be staged at the theatre, namely those written by Brad Fraser and Tracy Letts. Brown described himself as "a risk-taker; I had a taste for doing plays that are a bit between-the-eyes: most London theatres didn't dare put on Brad Fraser['s plays] because of the explicit sex". Fraser has been hailed by director Dominic Dromgoole as "the early prophet, the John the Baptist of the brutalist school that flourished in the mid-nineties. A lot of tricks that tired by the end of the Nineties, the rimming, the sadism, the antibodies, the sexual frankness, the cool irony in the face of outrage, began with Fraser". Brown also developed "Scottish work with Scottish actors" such as the "provocative" 1992 play The Life of Stuff written by "local actor" Simon Donald. Sierz has said that Brown unknowingly was "opening the long road that led to Anthony Neilson, to Mark Ravenhill (who was influenced by the work of Canadian Brad Fraser) and to that 1990s youth anthem, Trainspotting".

Sierz also claims that Brown's programming was part of a broader "Scottish theatricality" that "kick-started" the in-yer-face theatre of London (such as Jeremey Weller's Edinburgh-based company the Grassmarket Project, which influenced the work of Sarah Kane) and that "Scottish playwriting [had] a profound effect […] on the in-yer-face sensibility".

==== Young British Artists and Philip Ridley ====
The second "mighty moment" that Sierz cites is Philip Ridley's play The Pitchfork Disney being performed at the Bush Theatre in 1991. Sierz has declared that The Pitchfork Disney "is not only a key play of the 90s; it is the key play of that decade... Its legend grew and grew until it became the pivotal influence on the generation of playwrights that followed. It is a foundation text; it separates then from now." Sierz goes on to write that the play "introduced a totally new sensibility into British theatre [that] signalled a fresh direction for contemporary playwrighting: one that eschewed realistic naturalism, political ideology and social commentary, and turned auditoriums into cauldrons of sensation", adding that the play was "an agenda setting work: the era of experiential theatre began here." The artistic director of the Bush Theatre, Dominic Dromgoole, wrote that The Pitchfork Disney "was one of the first plays to signal a new direction for new writing. No politics, no naturalism, no journalism, no issues. In its place, character, imagination, wit, sexuality, skin and the soul."

Ridley started writing the play during the 1980s while he was an art student at St Martin's School of Art, with the play evolving out of a series of performance art monologues he had created in his final year of study. Ridley identifies himself as a contemporary of the Young British Artists (also known as the YBAs). These artists are regarded to have started with Damien Hirst's exhibition Freeze in 1988 and have been described by Sierz as "the in-yer-face provocateurs of the art scene [whose] 1997 Sensation exhibition was an immensely influential example of that 1990s sensibility". Ridley has claimed that he knew "most of the people that went on to be in the controversial Sensation show". Although Ridley's early plays were produced years before this exhibition, he states that his plays share the same "sensibility" as Sensation, particularly in the plays' use of imagery. Sierz in part attributes Ridley's originality as a playwright from him training at an art school instead of attending a drama school or a theatre's 'new writing programme'. Sierz therefore feels that the history of new writing during the 1990s should not start with The Royal Court Theatre, but "perhaps, more accurately" should look instead at "St Martin's College of Art and Goldsmiths College. Culturally, there's clearly a nexus between the YBAs, Cool Britannia and Brit Pop."

==== The murder of James Bulger ====
Another "mighty moment" that Sierz attributes to the development of in-yer-face theatre is the real-life murder of James Bulger, who was only two years old when he was abducted, tortured and killed by two ten-year-old boys in 1993. Sierz states that this was "arguably a key event" of 1990s culture.

In 2004 the playwright Mark Ravenhill gave a lecture entitled 'A Tear in the Fabric: the James Bulger Murder and New Theatre Writing in the 1990s'. In this lecture Ravenhill explained how the Bulger murder prompted him to make his "first attempt at writing a play". Ravenhill believes that the murder may have inspired other playwrights from the 1990s: "I wonder if I was alone? I doubt it. I wonder how many other people there were who started to write with that CCTV picture of the boy led away somewhere in their head? […] How many of the young British playwrights of the 1990s — the so-called in-yer-face playwrights — were driven, consciously or unconsciously, by that moment?"

Sierz also states that the murder "resulted in calls for the censorship of films, of television and of art works" because "in 1994 the judge in the boys' trial explained the murder by speculating that they had been exposed to a violent video, Child's Play 3, this created a media storm which, I would argue, is the cultural context for the media uproar over Blasted".

==== Stephen Daldry at The Royal Court Theatre ====
Sierz cites the programming by artistic director Stephen Daldry at The Royal Court Theatre as another "mighty moment" for in-yer-face-theatre. Sierz says that Daldry "not only enjoyed shocking people, but was skilled at getting funding for new projects", while being "Adept at playing the media, he not only programmed provocative plays, but defended them vigorously in public". Appointed as the theatre's artistic director in 1992, the first play that Daldry programmed was Weldon Rising by Phyllis Nagy, which Sierz states "sent a signal, influencing other young writers".

Sierz credits a turning-point for the theatre when Daldry remodelled his programming policy in 1994 from focusing on American work and "gay physical theatre to text-based drama [where] he decided to stage a large number of first-time dramatists". Daldry said that "From autumn 1994, the Court doubled its amount of new productions in the Theatre Upstairs and focussed on young writers". Daldry's first season of work by new writers in 1994-95 included a number of in-yer-face plays, such as Some Voices by Joe Penhall, Peaches by Nick Grosso and Ashes and Sand by Judy Upton.

Sierz notes "the key play" of this season being Blasted by Sarah Kane. Sierz says that "one of the lynchpin moments of the 1990s was the script meeting [at The Royal Court] that decided to stage Sarah Kane's Blasted. Although promoting new writing was a deliberate policy, this meeting might have chosen to pass on Blasted, and the history of the rest of the decade might have been so very different." When Blasted premiered some critics were so offended by the play's depiction of horrors (including physical violence, defecation, rape and cannibalism) that they contacted news outlets to voice their outrage. This caused a media frenzy which resulted in the play being at "the centre of the biggest scandal to theatre since Mary Whitehouse tried to close Howard Brenton's The Romans in Britain in 1981." Sierz says that "Within days after its opening […] Blasted became the most talked about play for years, the hottest show in town. Pretty soon, it became clear that it would be the most notorious play of the decade". Sierz also states that "the resulting media furore of the shocking content and unsettling form of the play put British new writing on the map", with the controversy becoming a "significant cultural moment" and that with Blasted "a new exciting sensibility arrived". While away on a fundraising trip to New-York Daldry was called back to England to appear on Newsnight and The World at One to defend the play amid the controversy. Sierz says that with this "Daldry realised his new role. When he defended [Kane], he was also defending himself and rediscovering the Court's mission. The noise of controversy told him that provocation was the right method: as well as bringing in new audiences, it renewed his sense of identity. As the Court rediscovered its roots as a controversial theatre, Daldry became the impresario of in-yer-face drama."

Other notable in-yer-face plays that The Royal Court programmed while Daldry was artistic director include Penetrator (1994) by Anthony Neilson, Mojo (1995) by Jez Butterworth, The Beauty Queen of Leenane (1996) by Martin McDonagh, Shopping and Fucking (1996) by Mark Ravenhill and The Censor (1997) by Anthony Neilson.

==== Martin Crimp's Attempts on Her Life ====
Sierz included Martin Crimp's play Attempts on her Life as one of the "mighty moments" in the development of in-yer-face theatre. Performed in 1997 at the Royal Court, Sierz described the premiere production as "an event that secured [Crimp]'s reputation as the most innovative, most exciting and most exportable playwright of his generation." Presented by Crimp as "seventeen scenarios for the theatre", the play has been cited as a pioneering work for its unconventional form and structure. Sierz has described the play as "a postmodernist extravaganza that could be read as a series of provocative suggestions for creating a new kind of theatre. The recipe was: subvert the idea of coherent character; turn scenes into flexible scenarios; substitute brief messages or poetic clusters for text; mix clever dialogue with brutal images; stage the show as an art installation. The playtext doesn't specify who says which lines, but Tim Albery's production brought out the acuity and humour of Crimp's writing, with its characteristic irony, and its pointed comments on the pointlessness of searching for a point." Sierz has called Attempts on Her Life "one of the most influential pieces of contemporary theatre" and has lauded the play as being "Crimp's masterpiece", "the best play of the [1990s]" and stated in 2005 that the play "has a good claim to be considered one of the very best British plays of the past 25 years".

=== Decline of in-yer-face theatre ===
Towards the end on the 1990s there were declining numbers of new in-yer-face plays being performed in Britain.

In January 1997 Stephen Daldry said that "When I first arrived [at the Royal Court] there were a lot of gay plays, then came violent plays like Mojo and Shopping and Fucking. I feel that trend is on the way out now."

Sierz credits three events, which for him "suggested that the tide was turning and that an era of confrontation had come to an end", signalling the decline of in-yer-face theatre:

The first is "the enormous success of Conor McPherson's The Weir", which premiered at The Theatre Upstairs at The Royal Court in 1997 before it "transferred to the West End for almost three years, then Broadway" with "its box-office success being crucial to the [Royal Court] theatre's fragile finances". Sierz has said that "[the play] – despite that unpleasant episode about paedophiles in one of the ghost stories and the emotionally fraught aspect of the final story about losing your child – has got a very redemptive feel which most 'in-yer-face' plays don't have" and that the play's "immense success suggest[ed] that the public's taste for shock has been superseded by a desire for a calmer aesthetic."

The next event that Sierz cites is "the failure of Irvine Welsh's shock-fest You'll Have Had Your Hole" which "received deservedly terrible reviews when it opened at the West Yorkshire Playhouse in 1998 and on its arrival in London in early February 1999".

The last key event Sierz cites is the death of Sarah Kane in February 1999 which he has referred to as "a convenient end point".

David Eldridge wrote that "Perhaps, 'in-yer-face' only really lasted from 1994 to 1997", likewise citing The Weir as "signalling a change of direction" and stating that "by the time Ben Elton was mocking the form in a novel [Inconceivable published in 1999] it was over."

Sierz has said that "After 1999, you still get individual plays that have that [in-yer-face] sensibility, but it's no longer the norm" as "By 2000, there were signs that the heady days of outrage were numbered". Sierz has said that by the time his book In-yer-face Theatre: British Drama Today was published in March 2001 "the brash phenomenon of in-yer-face theatre […] loses not only much of its intensity, but also becomes less central to the British New Writing scene." He therefore feels that his book "is inevitably something of a backward glance". However, Seirz says that "although by 2001 the new wave has broken, one of the reasons for this is that in-yer-face theatre has done its job — it has kicked down the door of complacency in the theatre, and, where it led, others have followed. In-yer-face writers give theatre the oxygen of publicity, and help inspire the diverse New Writing culture that has emerged since."

In 2004 Sierz hosted a debate on New Writing, which featured the playwrights Mark Ravenhill, Simon Stephens and Richard Bean as panellists. An audience member asked the panel if they thought that in-yer-face theatre "was now no longer at the forefront" of new writing. Bean responded by saying "I think it's quite true that things have moved on". He explained how it no longer is seen as shocking or cutting edge to have sex scenes in plays, stating that "I suppose there came a point where if you went to The Royal Court and somebody got their knob out and spat in their hand, and you think 'oh here we go again'". Sierz added to this comment by jokingly remarking how previously "there was a time in the 1990s that if you didn't see an anal rape on stage, you asked for your money back". Bean pointed out how his 2004 play Honeymoon Suite contained "two fucks and a wank" yet critics felt it was a "very commercial play" and thus wondered why it was "being put on on the main stages of The Royal Court?" Bean felt that this reaction from critics demonstrated how "obviously all that kind of gross behaviour is now perfectly acceptable" in plays. Stephens, who has tutored at The Royal Court's Young Writers' Programme, responded to the question by saying that: "It's fascinating now giving copies of Blasted to a group of young writers in The Young Writers Programme, and they find it completely alien and completely tedious and completely disinteresting. […] They're responding to it with anger, which I find really bracing." He went on to say that he thought this anger towards the play was because "in the wake of [Blasted and] that initial rush of very strong [in-yer-face] plays, an awful lot of lesser plays were written by pale imitators so that images of anal rape became tedious and became kind of signatures. And I think they're maybe not distinguishing between the people who are original with those plays and their imitators, and they just find it a little bit gratuitous […] not gratuitous because it's offensive, but gratuitous because it's boring now."

In an essay published in 2008, Sierz wrote that "Although some playwrights, such as Philip Ridley, debbie tucker green and Dennis Kelly, use some of the techniques of in-yer-face theatre, the general scene has moved on".

== Critical categorisation ==
The process of appropriating and applying such a pre-existing phrase or concept to describe new theatrical works provides a critical means of "categorizing" or "labelling", and some critics have stated, "pigeonholing", or "domesticating" ("taming") them. The creation of in-yer-face theatre parallels the history of more-prevalently accepted literary-critical coinages by critics like Martin Esslin (Theatre of the Absurd), who extended the existential philosophical concept of the Absurd to drama and theatre in his 1961 book of that title, and Irving Wardle (Comedy of menace), who borrowed the phrase from the subtitle of The Lunatic View: A Comedy of Menace, by David Campton, in 1958 reviews of productions of Campton's play and of The Birthday Party, by Harold Pinter, applying Campton's subtitle to Pinter's work.

In-yer-face theatre has often been mistakenly categorised as being a 'movement' which Sierz has disputed:

In-yer-face theatre was never a movement and I've never said that it was. You can't sign a manifesto, buy a membership card or join a march in favour of in-yer-face theatre and, as I never tire of explaining to the people who email me about it, in-yer-face theatre is not an actual theatre building, nor is it a theatre company. […] Instead, in-yer-face theatre is both a sensibility and a series of theatrical techniques.

== 2002 conference ==
"In-yer-face theatre" was debated at a two-day conference at the University of the West of England, held in 2002, at which Sierz was a keynote speaker. Sierz's own report on the conference is archived on his website.

In summarising the results of the conference, co-conveners Graham Saunders and Rebecca D'Monté observe that Sierz acknowledged that by 2002 "in-yer-face theatre" had already become an historical phenomenon (a trend of the past; hence, passé), going on to state:

Despite its title, the conference also became a forum in which the current state of new writing in British theatre was discussed. David Eldridge, in the opening address, saw many of the plays from the period as a direct response from 'Thatcher's Children' – the generation who had grown up in a period in which the British Left seemed fractured and directionless, the Cold War escalated and free market economics brutally re-shaped our society and culture. Eldridge warned of the mythologies and self-aggrandising agendas that can grow up when writers are placed in 'movements', and what [alluding to the Donmar Warehouse] he called the current trend of 'Donmarization' in British theatre, whereby major Hollywood stars have been recruited in order to make a new play more palatable to audiences.

Another conference report, published by Writernet, states: "to be shackled to a specific era or genre places a responsibility on a play and creates expectations before a reading or performance. In essence, it disrupts the artistic integrity through preconceived notions of a play because of a simplified label. Plays and playwrights risk being annexed or 'ghetto-ised' when given a superficial monolithic focus."

Writernet adds: "This problem was reflected in number of papers from all over the world, which primarily explored the works of Sarah Kane and Mark Ravenhill through theoretical lenses of postmodernism, metaphysical theatre, Artaud's Theatre of Cruelty, and Lacan. Through no fault of the organizers – this was apparently an accurate reflection of the conference submissions."

Yet, this report observes also that, "In his own defense, Sierz stipulated that 'in-yer-face' was not a movement, but an 'arena' or 'a sensibility'," and that "In-yer-face theatre describes only a part of the body of works during the 1990s." It notices, moreover, that Sierz "accepted the limitations of his book and the label, acknowledging it as both London-centric and limited in its scope."

Nevertheless, it cites "Max Stafford-Clark (founder of Out of Joint and Joint Stock theatre companies and ex-artistic director of the Royal Court Theatre and the Traverse in Edinburgh)," who, "when asked about plays in the 1990s," reportedly observed that "Everybody's looking at the same view, so the paintings are bound to have similarities."

== Notable people ==
According to Sierz, "The big three of in-yer-face theatre are Sarah Kane, Mark Ravenhill and Anthony Neilson"; in listing 14 "Other hot shots" in "Who?" on his website, Sierz adds the following qualification: "Of course, some writers wrote one or two in-yer-face plays and then moved on. Like all categories, this one can't hope to completely grasp the ever-changing reality of the explosive new writing scene."

Sources: Aleks Sierz and David Eldridge.

- Kate Ashfield (actress) (Note: Kate Ashfield originated the role Cate in James Macdonald's 1995 production of Sarah Kane's Blasted. She also originated the role of Lulu in Max Stafford-Clark's September 1996 production of Mark Ravenhill's Shopping and Fucking)
- Simon Block (playwright)
- Jez Butterworth (playwright)
- Stephen Daldry (artistic director of the Royal Court 1992 - 1998)
- David Eldridge (playwright)
- debbie tucker green (playwright)
- Nick Grosso (playwright)
- Alex Jones (playwright)
- Sarah Kane (playwright and director)
- Dennis Kelly (playwright)
- Tracy Letts (playwright)
- Patrick Marber (playwright and director)
- Martin McDonagh (playwright)
- Phyllis Nagy (playwright and director)
- Anthony Neilson (playwright, director and actor)
- Joe Penhall (playwright)
- Rebecca Prichard (playwright)
- Mark Ravenhill (playwright)
- Philip Ridley (playwright)
- Judy Upton (playwright)
- Naomi Wallace (playwright)

=== Gallery ===
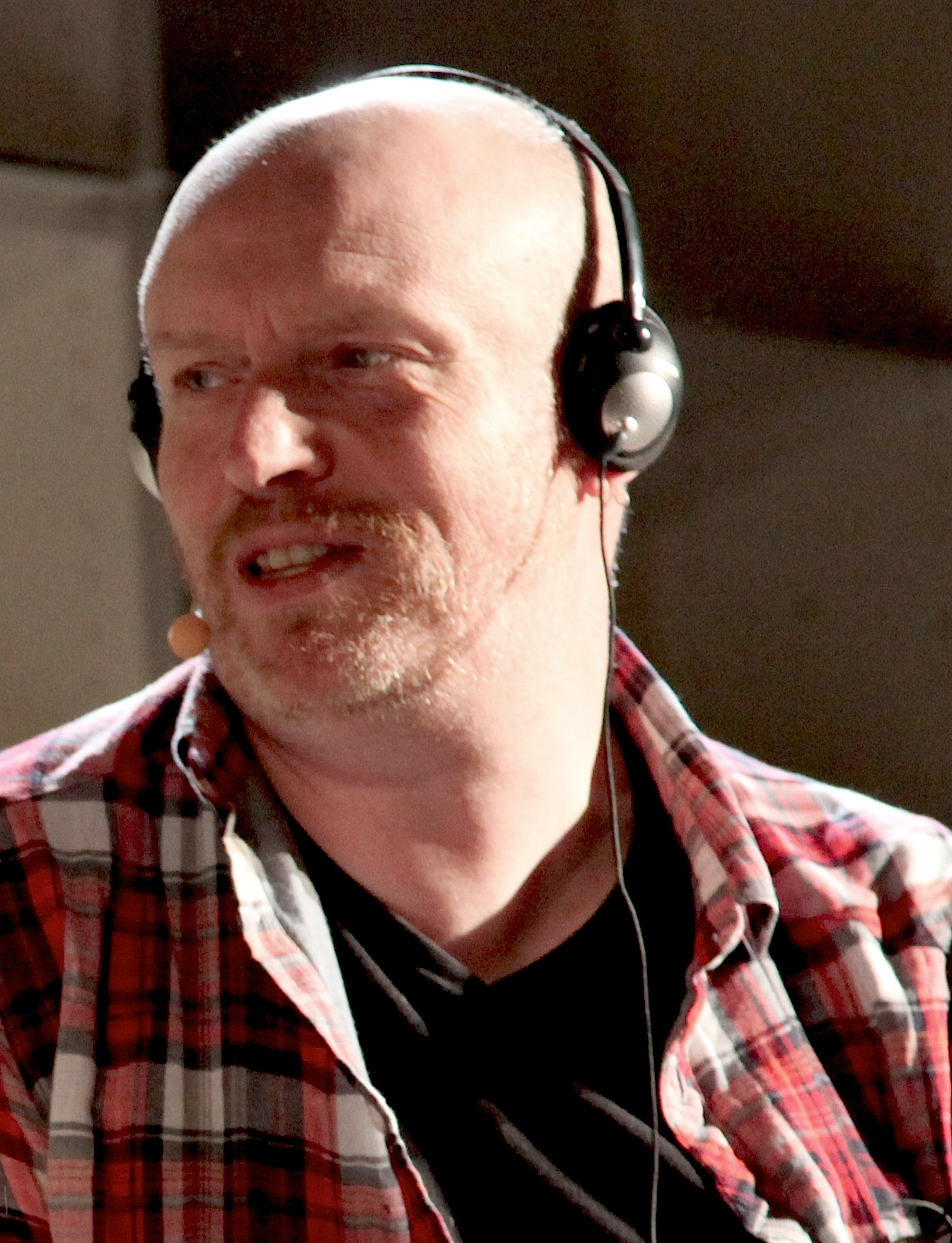
Mark Ravenhill

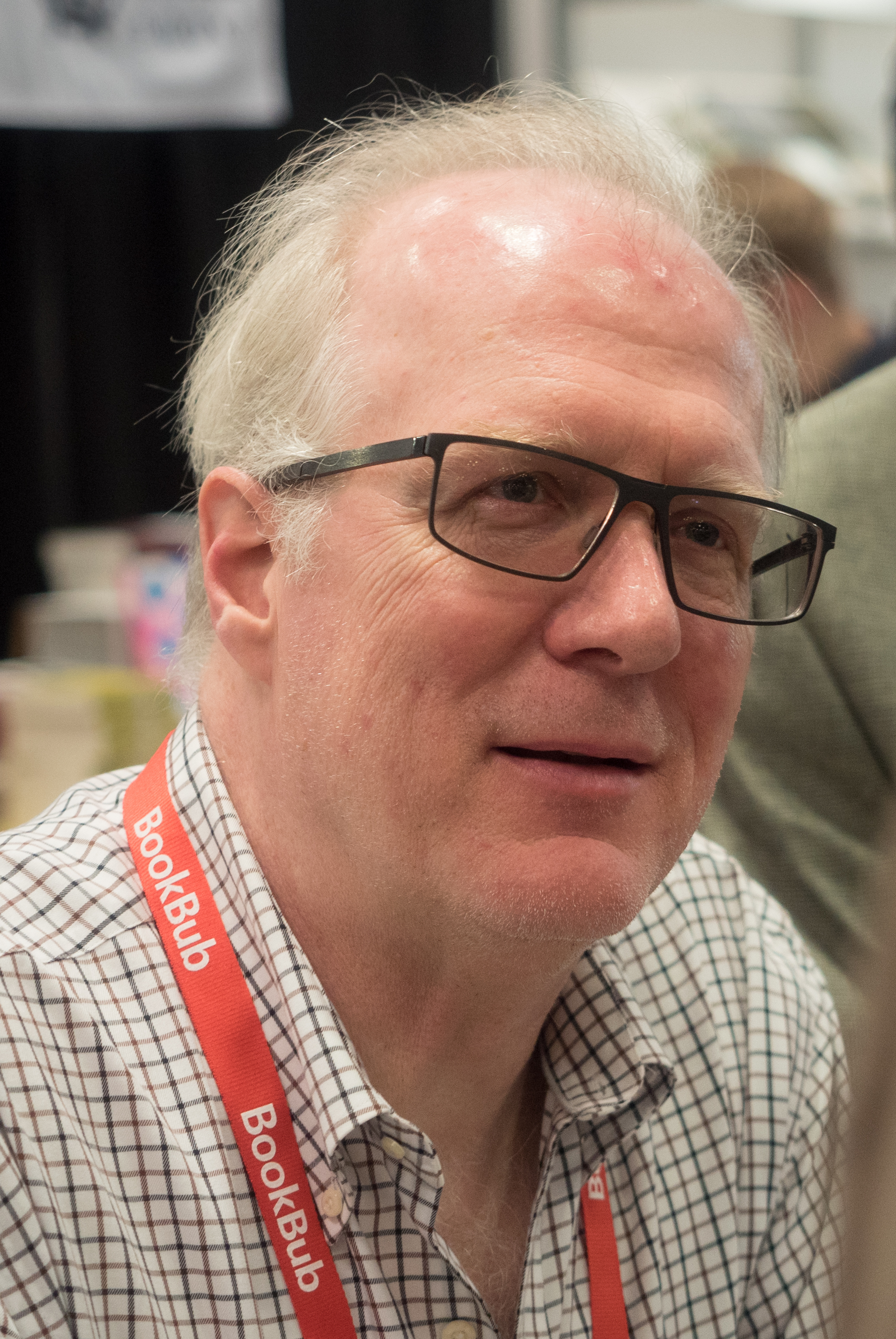
Tracy Letts

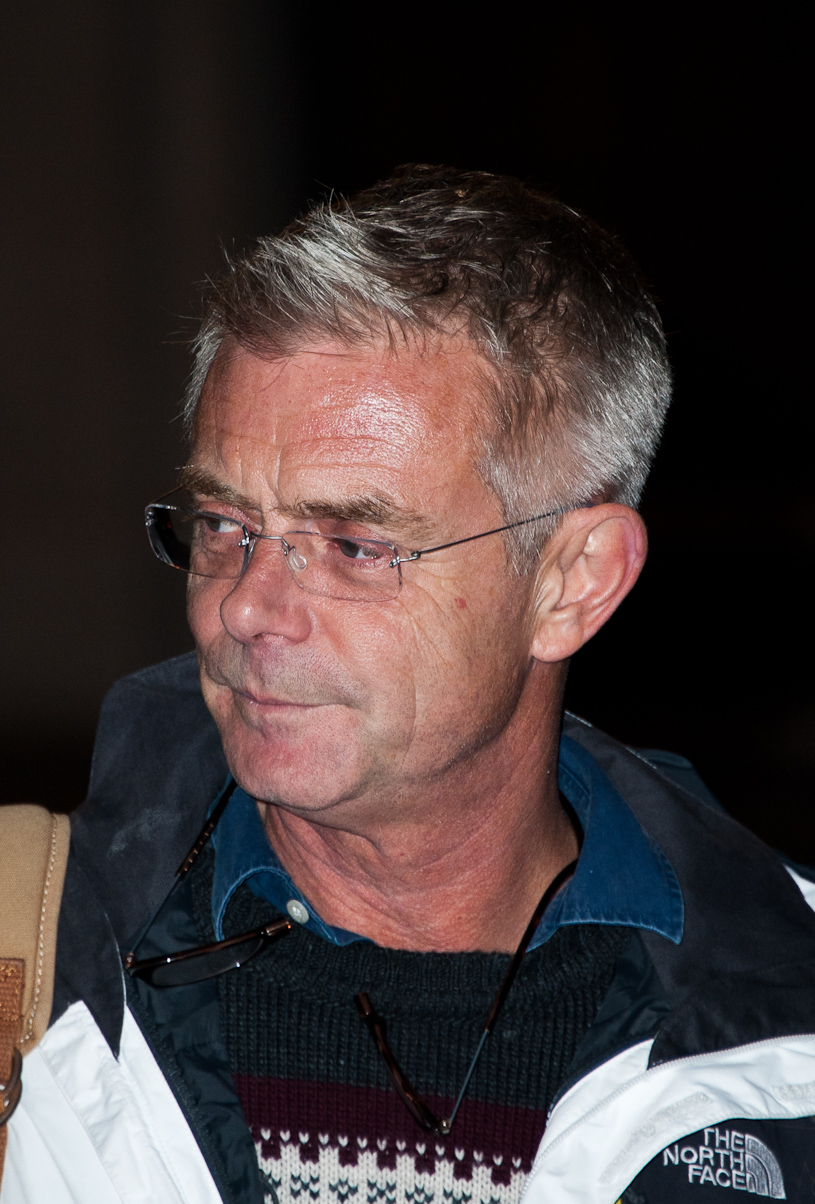
Stephen Daldry

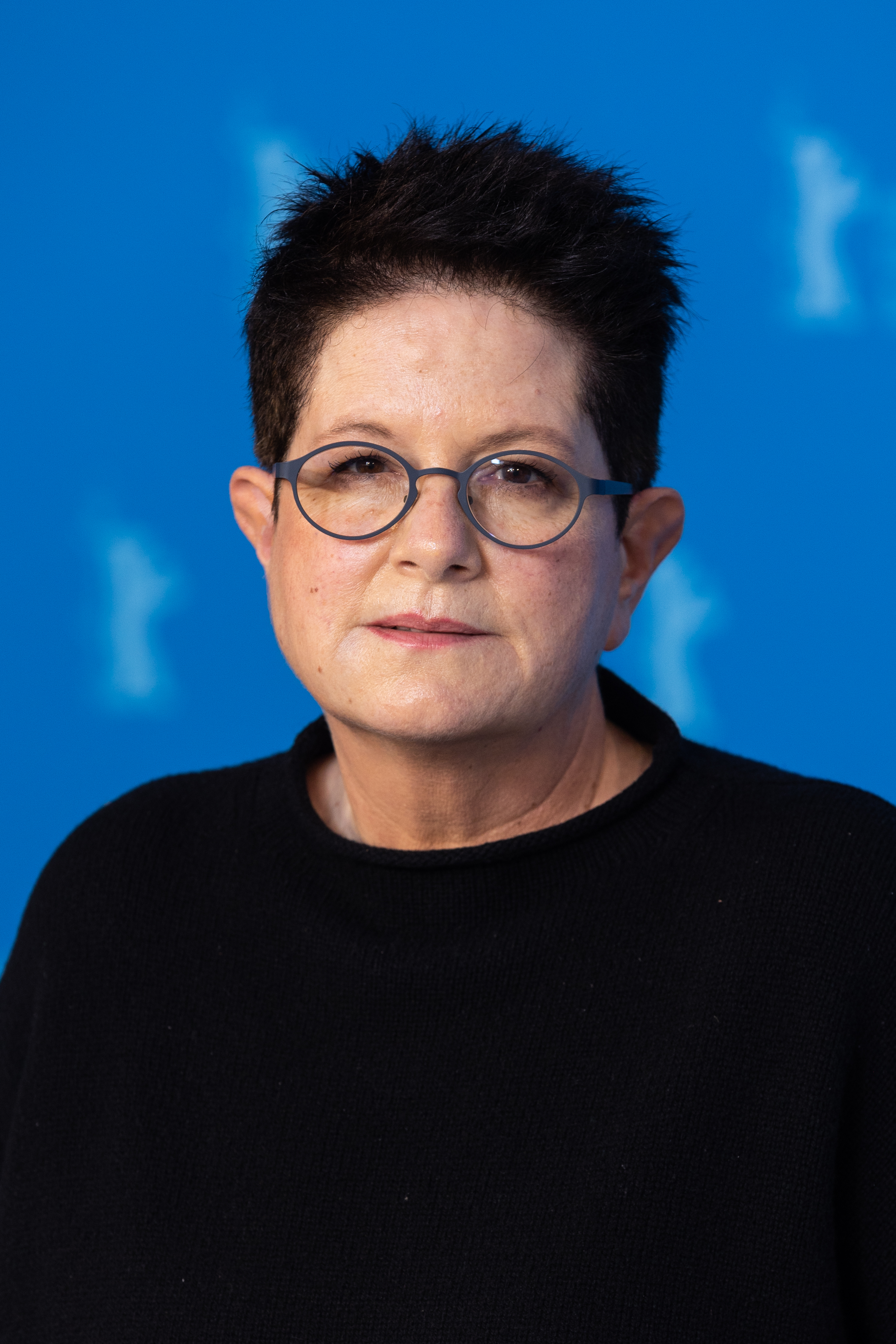
Phyllis Nagy

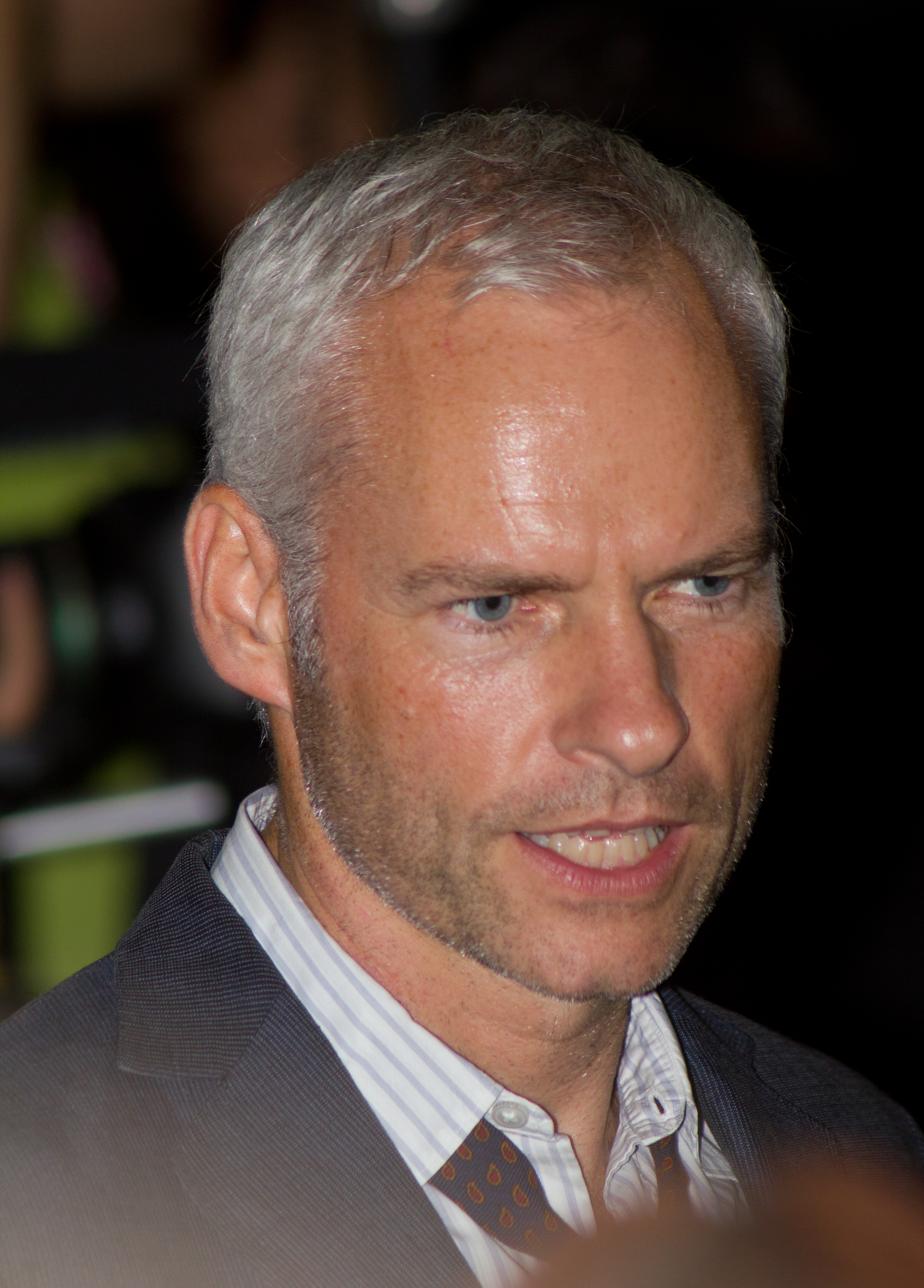
Martin McDonagh

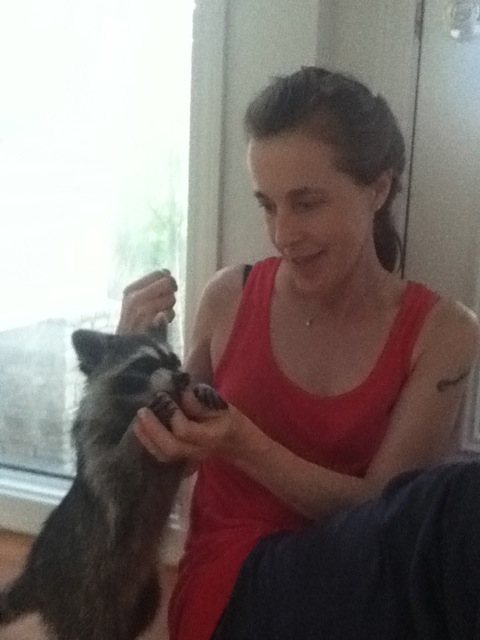
Naomi Wallace

== Plays ==
=== Major works ===
- (1991) The Pitchfork Disney by Philip Ridley
- (1992) The Fastest Clock in the Universe by Philip Ridley
- (1993) The Treatment by Martin Crimp
- (1993) Killer Joe by Tracy Letts
- (1993) Penetrator by Anthony Neilson
- (1994) Ghost from a Perfect Place by Philip Ridley
- (1994) Butterfly Kiss by Phyllis Nagy
- (1994) Trainspotting by Harry Gibson, an adaptation from the eponymous novel by Irvine Welsh
- (1995) Blasted by Sarah Kane
- (1995) Mojo by Jez Butterworth
- (1996) Shopping and Fucking by Mark Ravenhill
- (1996) The Beauty Queen of Leenane by Martin McDonagh
- (1997) Attempts on Her Life by Martin Crimp
- (1997) The Censor by Anthony Neilson
- (1997) Closer by Patrick Marber
- (1998) Yard Girl by Rebecca Prichard
- (1998) Cleansed by Sarah Kane
- (1998) Real Classy Affair by Nick Grosso
- (2002) Stitching by Anthony Nielson
- (2005) Mercury Fur by Philip Ridley

=== Other plays ===
- John Roman Baker – Freedom to Party (1991), Easy (1993), In One Take (1994), The Prostitution Plays (2000), East Side Skin (2003)
- Simon Donald – The Life of Stuff (1993)
- Simon Farquhar – Rainbow Kiss (2006)
- Kathryn O'Reilly – Screwed (2016)
- Mike Packer – tHe dYsFUnCKshOnalZ! (2007)
- Peter Rose – Snatch (1998)
- Penelope Skinner – Eigengrau (2010)
- Simon Stephens – Herons (2001)
- Ché Walker – Flesh Wound (2003)
- Irvine Welsh – You'll Have Had Your Hole (1998)

== Cultural references ==
In David Eldridge's 1996 play A Week With Tony the character of Nicholas says that "I got taken along to a play in Chelsea and I was quite shocked. All eye-gouging and buggery and not five minutes from the King's Road!" This is likely a reference to the play Blasted which was performed at the Royal Court, which is close to King's Road.

In Ben Elton's 1999 novel Inconceivable, a character says that they saw a play at The Royal Court called Fucking and Fucking and remarks "at the Royal Court they positively insist on having rude words in their [plays'] titles and anal sex by the end of scene one."

In Simon Gray's play Japes Michael Cartts, a middle-aged author, rages against a new kind of writing that he describes as "in your face". After watching a new play by a young playwright, Cartts describes the stage characters as follows:

[They] had the impertinence, no, the hubris to utter those most terrifying of words, "I love you," [but] what did they mean by them? They meant "I've fucked you and now I need to fuck you again, and possibly a few more times after that and I'll be jealous, insane with jealousy if anyone else fucks you" .... All they do is fuck each other and all they talk about is how they do it, and who they'd really rather be doing it with or to—and they don't cloak it in their language .... No words that even hint at inner lives, no friendships except as opportunities for sexual competition and betrayal, no interests or passions or feelings, as if the man were the cock, the cock the man, the woman the cunt, the cunt the woman, and the only purpose in life to ram cock into cunt, jam cunt over cock .... And you know—you know the worst thing—the worst thing is that they speak grammatically. They construct sentences. Construct them! And with some elegance. Why? Tell me why? (Little pause.) Actually, I know why. So that the verbs and nouns stick out—in your face. In your face. That's the phrase, isn't it? That's the phrase! In your face!

In the 2006 film Venus the elderly actor Maurice Russell takes the young woman Jessie to see a play at The Royal Court Theatre Upstairs. The play features a scene with three girls in their late-teens speaking to one another with explicit language. Although the published screenplay written by Hanif Kureishi featured swearing in this scene, the dialogue used in the film is more explicit, with a line delivered by one of the stage actors being changed from "silly cow" to "stupid cunt".

In-yer-face theatre is parodied in one episode of the mockumentary BBC Radio programme Incredible Women. In the episode Jeremey Front presents a fictional radio documentary about the controversial theatre maker Bella Hayman. Hayman, whose breakout play was Hysterectomy 5-9-1, is described as the "Les Enfant Terribles of British theatre" with "a reputation for staging the unstageable or what some would call the unwatchable" and is "famous for repulsing and occasionally hospitalising audiences". Jeremey attends a play of Hayman's called Razor F**K, which is described as a "site-specific, cross-platform, multi-media, immersive experience containing strong language and explicit violence". The play features two male actors who are naked, except for wearing buckets on their heads, being beaten by a woman in uniform wielding a bullwhip. The performance also has the naked actors crawling on a floor awash with stage blood and features a scene where the Chancellor of the Exchequer is castrated. The episode has Maureen Lipman playing herself as an actress appearing in an ill-fated West End revival of Noël Coward's Present Laughter, which Hayman re-stages with scenes of violence. Jeremey concludes the documentary saying that "there is no question that Bella Hayman is a visionary. One of our most innovative directors with tremendous style and a great eye. It's just a pity that eye has to be gouged out with a grapefruit spoon."

== See also ==
- New Drama, a Russian theatre movement sometimes likened to In-yer-face theatre

== Bibliography ==
- Dromgoole, Dominic. The Full Room: An A-Z of Contemporary Playwriting. London: Methuen, 2002. ISBN 0-413-77134-2.
- Eldridge, David. "In-Yer-face and After". Intellect 23.1 (Mar. 2003): 55–58. (Abstract.)
- Eyre, Richard and Nicholas Wright. Changing Stages: A View of British Theatre in the Twentieth Century. London: Bloomsbury, 2001. ISBN 0-7475-5254-1.
- Gray, Simon. Japes. London: Nick Hern Books, 2001. ISBN 1-85459-470-2.
- "In-Yer-Face? British Drama in the 1990s". University of the West of England, Bristol. 6–7 September 2002, Writernet 2003. Retrieved 9 June 2008. (Conference report posted on writernet.co.uk, in both HTML and PDF versions).
- "News 2002: Shocking Plays Have Academic Appeal." Press release. University of the West of England 30 August 2002. Retrieved 9 June 2008.
- Saunders, Graham, and Rebecca D'Monté. "Theatres Shock Therapy". School of English, University of the West of England (UWE). HERO (primary internet portal for academic research and higher education in the UK) September 2002. Retrieved 9 June 2008. (Account of In-Yer-Face? British Drama in the 1990s, a two-day conference held at the St. Matthias Campus of the University of the West of England, in Bristol, England, on 6 and 7 September 2002.)
- Sierz, Aleks. In-Yer-Face Theatre: British Drama Today. London: Faber and Faber, 2001. ISBN 0-571-20049-4.
- –––. "Still In-Yer-Face? Towards a Critique and a Summation". New Theatre Quart. 18.1 (2002): 17–24. Published online by Cambridge University Press, journals.cambridge.org. Retrieved 9 June 2008. (Abstract. Subscription required for full access.)
