= Rebecca Prichard =

English playwright (born 1971)

Rebecca Prichard (born 1971) is an English author and playwright, and one of the major contributors to the in-yer-face theatre movement.

== Biography ==
She was born and raised in Essex. Prichard studied drama at Exeter University and made her playwriting debut with Essex Girls, which premiered in 1994 at the Royal Court Young Writer's festival. It is regarded by playwright Mark Ravenhill as one of the best post-Top Girls all female plays. The play was translated into Swedish by Nils Gredeby and staged as Ur Funktion at Uppsala City Theater in 1999, with direction by Birgitta Englin.

In 1998, she was presented with the Critics' Circle Award for Most Promising Playwright.

== Selected works ==
- Essex Girls
- Charged
- Futures
- Fair Game
- Yard Gal
