= The Sadist (book) =

1938 true crime book by Karl Berg

- Author: Karl Berg
- Original title: Der Sadist
- Language: German
- Genre: Non-fiction

The Sadist (German: Der Sadist) is a book published by psychiatrist Karl Berg, following the confessions of Peter Kürten, a notorious German serial killer known as both The Vampire of Düsseldorf and the Düsseldorf Monster who committed a series of assaults and murders, primarily between 1929 and 1930.

The book was originally written in German. The first English edition was issued in 1938, by Acorn Press. A second edition was published by William Heinemann Medical Books in 1945.
