= Anthony Neilson =

Scottish playwright & director (born 1967)

- Born: 1967 (age 58–59); Edinburgh, Scotland
- Occupations: Playwright, theatre director, screenwriter

Anthony Neilson (born 1967, Edinburgh) is a Scottish playwright and director. He is known for his collaborative way of writing and workshopping his plays. Much of his work is characterised by the exploration of sex and violence.

Neilson has been cited as a key figure of In-yer-face theatre, a term used to characterise new plays with a confrontational style and sensibility that emerged in British theatre during the 1990s. He has been credited with coining the phrase "in-your-face theatre" but has rejected the label and instead describes his work in this style as “'experiential' theatre”.

Experimenting with various other forms of theatre, Neilson is also recognised for creating non-naturalistic plays that utilise elements of absurdist and expressionist storytelling to depict the interior landscape of their characters. He has described such theatre as "psycho-absurdism".

== Career ==
=== Writing ===
Neilson studied at the Royal Welsh College of Music and Drama but expelled for "insubordination", now unoccupied he entered a BBC young writers' competition and won which started him on the path of becoming a writer.

He also participated in the Bush Theatre's 2011 project Sixty Six Books, writing a piece based upon a book of the King James Bible. He has also written for the television series Spooks.

=== Directing ===
Neilson has more recently moved into directing with his first feature film The Debt Collector in 1999 which won the Fipresci (International Critics) Award at the Troia International Film Festival. As his writing work involves collaborations he has a massive directorial role in the creation of his plays but in 2007 he was credited as director of his play God in Ruins at the Soho Theatre. At the RSC he directed the world premiere of The Drunks by the Durnenkov Brothers in 2009. In 2010 he directed Caledonia by Alistair Beaton at the Edinburgh Festival.

== Association with in-yer-face theatre ==
In-yer-face theatre is a label used to characterise a confrontational style and sensibility of drama that emerged in new plays (primarily written by young writers) that were performed in Great Britain during the 1990s. This label was popularised by critic Aleks Sierz in his 2001 book In-Yer-Face Theatre: British Drama Today, where he analysed and celebrated this style of drama. In the book Sierz wrote an entire chapter examining Neilson's work and three of his plays: Normal, Penetrator and The Censor.

=== Reputation ===
Sierz has dubbed Neilson as one of "the big three" playwrights (along with Sarah Kane and Mark Ravenhill) associated with In-yer-face theatre, whom Sierz has referred to as "the most provocative new writers of the [nineties]" who also "had an influence that far outweighed the number of plays they wrote at the time... What they did was transform the language of theatre, making it more direct, raw and explicit. They not only introduced a new dramatic vocabulary, they also pushed theatre into being more experiential, more aggressively aimed at making audiences feel and respond."

Sierz has highlighted Neilson as "one of the first to exploit the new freedoms of nineties drama" and "one of the first writers of the decade to create an experiential theatre of extreme sensations", adding that "Although often underrated, Neilson's significance lies less in his skill as a writer than in his pioneering of a form of confrontational theatre that became central to the new aesthetic of British drama in the nineties."

=== Coining "In-your-face theatre" ===
Sierz has been mistakenly cited as coining the phrase “In-yer-face theatre”, writing that “Although I certainly was the first to describe, celebrate and theorise this kind of new writing, which emerged decisively in the mid-1990s, I certainly did not invent the phrase.” In his piece “A brief history of in-yer-face theatre” Sierz cites an interview with The Financial Times's critic Sraha Hemming in November 1995, where Neilson remarked “I think that in-your-face theatre is coming back — and that is good.” Sierz has stated that “As far as I know, this seems to be the very first coinage of the term “in-your-face theatre”.”

=== 'Experiential Theatre' and rejection of the 'In-yer-face' label ===
Although Sierz credits Neilson for coining the term "In-your-face theatre", Neilson has rejected the label to describe his own work and instead prefers to describe it as "experiential" theatre:

I will presume that you know about the "In-yer-face" school of theatre, of which I am allegedly a proponent... I've never really liked the term because it implies an attempt to repel an audience, which was never my aim. In fact, the use of morally contentious elements was always intended to do the very opposite. Given that one's genuine morality (as distinctive from the morality that we choose for ourselves) tends to be instinctive rather than cerebral, engaging a receptive audience with such issues is a useful way of scrambling the intellectual response that inhibit/protect us from full involvement with what we're watching. Engage the morality of an audience and they are driven into themselves. They become, in some small way, participants rather than voyeurs. That's why I prefer the term "experiential" theatre. If I make anything, let it be that.

Neilson has also stated "As far as I can tell, In-Yer-Face was all about being horrid and writing about shit and buggery. I thought I was writing love stories."
Sierz has defined 'experiential theatre' as describing:

the kind of drama, usually put on in studio spaces, that aims to give audiences the experience of actually having lived through the actions depicted on stage. (But not literally!) Instead of allowing spectators to just sit back and contemplate the play, experiential theatre grabs its audiences and forces them to confront the reality of the feelings shown to them. Yes, it's in-yer-face.

== Censorship of Stitching in Malta ==
In 2009 Neilson's play Stitching was planned to be staged in Malta by Unifaun Theatre but was banned by the Maltese Board of Film and Stage Classification. Initially no reason for the ban was given to the Unifaun Theatre. After chasing up for an explanation for the board's decision Unifaun Theatre received a letter from the police commissioner outlining the reason for the ban:

“1. Blasphemy against the State Religion – pages 10 and 17

2. Obscene contempt for the victims of Auschwitz – page 29

3. An encyclopaedic review of dangerous sexual perversions leading to sexual servitude – pages 33, 34 and several others

4. Abby’s eulogy to the child murderers Fred and Rosemary West – page 3

5. Reference to the abduction, sexual assault and murder of children – page 36

In conclusion, the play is a sinister tapestry of violence and perversion where the sum of the parts is greater than the whole. The Board feels that in this case the envelope has been pushed beyond the limits of public decency.”

Responding to the board's decision the play's producers stated that they planned to stage the play in defiance of the ban. At a press conference the production's director, Chris Gatt, explained that the creative team were looking for a suitable venue to stage the play but that the Maltese police could take action against them by "present[ing] the charges under the Film and Stage Classification legislation, then we would risk a fine of €11.65 for a first-time offence. However, if they prosecute us under the Criminal Code for violating obscenity and public decency, we risk a prison term of between 1 to 6 months." In response Friggiri issued a statement saying that “The play cannot be staged. The producers know they are breaking the law, but that’s their business. ... The play is an insult against human dignity from beginning to end ... The board’s remit is not to defend the law. Our obligation is to follow it.”

In response to the ban the British theatre critics Andrew Hayden and Aleks Sierz condemned the board's decision.

It took a Court Case 9 years to finally reverse the decision. In May 2018, the ECHR ruled that the ban was unlawful. However, the outcry following the case led to the dismantling of Censorship Laws in Malta and to the new Labour Government proposing to remove Obscenity and Blasphemy laws for works of Art.

== Work ==
=== Plays ===
- The Tell-Tale Heart (adapted from Edgar Allan Poe short story) 2018 National Theatre
- Alice's Adventures in Wonderland 2016 (adaptation of Lewis Carroll's works) Royal Lyceum Theatre
- Unreachable 2016 Royal Court Theatre
- The Haunting of Hill House 2015 Everyman and Playhouse
- Narrative 2013 Royal Court Theatre
- Sixty Six 2011 Bush Theatre (short piece)
- Get Santa! 2010 at the Royal Court Theatre
- The Seance 2009 at the National Theatre as part of Connections
- Relocated 2008 at the Royal Court Theatre
- The Big Lie 2008 at Latitude
- God in Ruins 2007 at the Soho Theatre
- Realism 2006 at the Edinburgh International Festival
- The Wonderful World of Dissocia 2004 at the Royal Lyceum Theatre
- Twisted 2003 at the Theatre Workshop at the Edinburgh Fringe
- The Lying Kind 2002 at the Royal Court Theatre; also adapted in Austria in 2007 as Schöne Bescherung, starring Michael Niavarani and Andreas Vitasek as the policemen and in France in 2013 by Jean-Luc Moreau as Les Menteurs, starring comedy duo Chevallier et Laspalès in the role of the policemen
- Edward Gant's Amazing Feats of Loneliness 2002 at the Drum Theatre
- Stitching (play) 2002 at the Traverse Theatre
- The Censor 1997 at the Finborough Theatre
- Hoover Bag 1996 at the Young Vic Theatre
- Hereditary 1995 at the Royal Court Theatre
- The Night Before Christmas 1995 at The Red Room
- The Year of the Family 1994 at the Finborough Theatre
- Penetrator 1993 at the Traverse Theatre
- Normal: The Düsseldorf Ripper 1991 at the Edinburgh Theatre Festival made into a film Angels Gone
- Welfare My Lovely 1990 at the Traverse Theatre

=== Radio Plays ===
- The Colours of the King's Rose (radio play)
- A Fluttering of Wings (radio play)
- Twisted (radio play)

== Filmography ==
- Deeper Still (short film)
- The Debt Collector (1999) - writer and director
- Normal the Düsseldorf Ripper (from the play "Normal: The Düsseldorf Ripper") (2009)
- Spooks (writer - 1 episode) (2010)
- De Komedie Compagnie (writer - 1 episode) (2011)
