= Simon Farquhar =

British actor and writer

Simon Alexander Farquhar (born 1972) is a British writer and broadcaster.

His early one-act plays were staged at the Aberdeen Arts Centre, until a radio script set in Cullen, Candy Floss Kisses, was picked up by actor and producer Martin Jarvis and commissioned for BBC Radio 4. This was followed by another Cullen-based drama, Elevenses with Twiggy, set during the dying days of the Sixties and featuring a cameo performance by Twiggy herself.

His first full-length stage play, the Aberdeen-based Rainbow Kiss, opened at the Royal Court in April 2006. The production starred Joseph McFadden and Dawn Steele and was directed by Richard Wilson, as part of the theatre's 50th anniversary season. Rainbow Kiss opened in New York in Spring 2008, directed by Will Frears and produced by The Play Company.

In October 2006 he was invited to take part in the Old Vic 24 Hour Plays Celebrity Gala. The annual fund-raising event sees six writers asked to each choose from a pool of available actors and each write a ten-minute play for them overnight which is then learned and performed the following evening on the Old Vic stage. The result was Dream Me a Winter starring Tamzin Outhwaite and Patricia Hodge.

He regularly writes for The Guardian, The Independent and The Times. He has also written many articles and appeared on television and radio as a television historian. In 2007 he wrote and presented the documentary Razor Sharp: The Story of Peter McDougall, the Scottish television dramatist, and in 2015, A Sympathetic Eye for BBC Radio 4. His book Play for Today: The First Year 1970-1971 was published in 2021.

His book A Dangerous Place: The Story of the Railway Murders (2016) tells the story of the crimes of John Duffy and David Mulcahy, and is a memoir of his father, one of the police officers who led the case in the 1980s. It was shortlisted for the 2017 CWA Gold Dagger Award for Non-Fiction.

In 2017 he wrote Wassail Play which was performed at the Theatre Royal, Dumfries.

A Desperate Business: The Murder of Muriel McKay was published in 2022. It told the story of the 1969 failed attempt to kidnap the wife of Rupert Murdoch, and the continuing mystery of what happened to Muriel McKay, kidnapped in error and never found.

A Deafening Silence: Forgotten British Murders in 2024 reflected on a decade of writing about and explored some of the stories he had heard along the way which had made a particular impact on him. "As well as a desire for remembrance, I was struck by the revelatory nature of each of them, what truths they held about our understanding of such crimes, the causes and effects, and what they tell us about the society that we live in—how it has changed or how it still needs to change".

== Radio ==
- Candy Floss Kisses (2004) – Afternoon Play, BBC Radio 4
- Elevenses with Twiggy (2006) – Afternoon Play, BBC Radio 4
- A Sympathetic Eye (2015) – Archive on 4, BBC Radio 4

== Stage ==
- I Do Solemnly Declare (2001) – Aberdeen Arts Centre
- Rainbow Kiss (2006) – Royal Court
- Dream Me a Winter (2006) – Old Vic (part of The 24 Hour Plays)
- Wassail Play (2017) – Theatre Royal, Dumfries

== Books ==
- A Dangerous Place (2016)
- Play for Today: The First Year 1970-1971 (2021)
- A Desperate Business: The Murder of Muriel McKay (2022)
- A Deafening Silence: Forgotten British Murders (2024)
