= Nick Grosso =

British playwright (born 1968)

Nick Grosso is a British playwright, born in London in 1968 to Argentine parents of Italian and Russian extraction. His style has been described as that of a "latter-day Oscar Wilde on speed" by Sheridan Morley.

== Career ==
In 1993, Grosso's monologue Mama Don't was produced by the Royal Court Young People's Theatre and put on at the Commonwealth Institute, London. It was directed by Roxanna Silbert.

A year later, his first stage play, Peaches, was produced by the Royal Court Theatre in association with the Royal National Theatre Studio and put on at the Royal Court Theatre, London. It starred Ben Chaplin. According to Michael Billington, the season in which Peaches appeared (which also included Blasted by Sarah Kane) defined the historical importance of the Theatre Upstairs, a season of new writing masterminded by Stephen Daldry.

In 1996, Grosso's second stage play, Sweetheart, was produced by the Royal Court Theatre and put on at the Royal Court Theatre, London, before embarking on a regional tour. It starred Kate Beckinsale.

In 1998, Grosso's third stage play, Real Classy Affair, was produced by the Royal Court Theatre and put on at the Ambassadors Theatre, London. It starred Joseph Fiennes and Nick Moran.

In 2000, Matthew Rhys played the lead role in Peaches, the film of the play written, it was also directed by Grosso.

His fourth stage play, Kosher Harry, was produced by the Royal Court Theatre and put on at the Royal Court Theatre, London, in 2002. It was directed by Kathy Burke and starred Martin Freeman.

Since then, the Hampstead Theatre in London has produced and put on three young people's plays by Grosso.

In 2004, Grosso directed his monologue Killing Paul McCartney at the Assembly Rooms at the Edinburgh Fringe Festival. It was produced by David Johnson and performed by Jake Wood.

The same year, Grosso was invited to participate in the inaugural 24 Hour Plays at the Old Vic Theatre, London, hosted by artistic director Kevin Spacey.

In 2005, Grosso wrote A Play in Swedish English And Italian for the Royal Dramatic Theatre in Stockholm, produced by Elverket.

Grosso's plays have received further productions in theatres such as the Salisbury Playhouse, other European countries, and American cities including New York, Chicago, and Los Angeles.

== Critical response ==
Grosso's work and role in contemporary theatre has been analysed in books such as State of Play by David Edgar (Faber and Faber, November 1999), In-Yer-Face Theatre by Aleks Sierz, and The Full Room by Dominic Dromgoole.
