= Alfred Fagon Award =

Annual award for the best new play by a Black British playwright

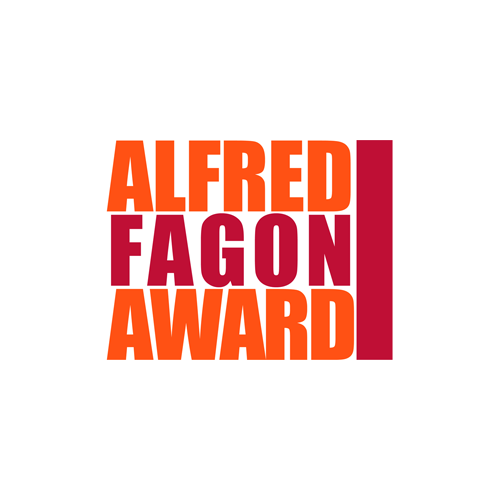
- Awarded for: Best new play by a Black British playwright of Caribbean or African descent resident in the United Kingdom
- Rewards: £6,000 (Best New Play) £3,000 (Roland Rees Bursary) £3,000 (Mustapha Matura Award)
- Established: 1996
- First award: 1997
- Currently held by: Harry Mould, for The Brenda Line
- Website: alfredfagonaward.co.uk

The Alfred Fagon Award is an annual prize for the best new play by a Black British playwright of Caribbean or African descent, resident in the United Kingdom. It was instituted in 1996 and first awarded in 1997, named in honour of the poet and playwright Alfred Fagon. The award is given with the support of the Peggy Ramsay Foundation and carries a prize of £6,000. It is widely regarded as the leading award for Black British playwrights.

== Background ==
The Alfred Fagon Award was established to commemorate the life and work of Alfred Fagon (1937–1986), a Jamaican-born playwright, poet and actor who was one of the most significant Black British playwrights of the 1970s and 1980s. Fagon died of a heart attack in August 1986 at the age of 49. Following his death, his friends organised a memorial evening at the Tricycle Theatre (now Kiln Theatre) in London, where donations collected during the evening formed the basis of a fund to support Black British playwrights.

The award was co-founded by Yvonne Brewster OBE, Roland Rees, Oscar James, Sheelagh Killeen Rees, Paul Stephenson OBE, and Mustapha Matura. Brewster, who co-founded Talawa Theatre Company in 1986, had been a close friend of Fagon's. Matura, the Trinidadian-born playwright in whose 1970 play Black Pieces Fagon had made his first professional stage appearance, had also encouraged Fagon to begin writing plays. The first award was presented to Roy Williams in 1997, supported by Arts Council England and the Peggy Ramsay Foundation.

The award was initially open to Black British playwrights of Caribbean descent. In 2006, on the occasion of its tenth anniversary, its scope was broadened to include playwrights of African descent. The tenth anniversary ceremony was held at the Royal Court Theatre, where Lorna French received the prize for her play Safe House, presented by Diane Abbott MP.

The award is a registered charity. The prize for the winning playwright is £6,000, awarded annually from an open call for submissions. The play does not need to have been professionally produced to be eligible.

For many years the award received administrative support from Talawa Theatre Company, and later from Tiata Fahodzi. Since 2014, administration and creative production has been provided by Pauline Walker of PDW Productions. Award ceremonies have been held at the Royal Court Theatre (1997–2007), the National Theatre (2008–2012; 2014–2015), the Tricycle Theatre (2013, now known as the Kiln Theatre), the Royal Court Theatre (2017), and the Dorfman Theatre at the National Theatre (2018, 2019, 2022, 2024, 2025). The 2020 ceremony was held digitally due to the COVID-19 pandemic in the United Kingdom.

Two of the award's co-founders died in the 2020s. Paul Stephenson OBE passed away on 2 November 2024; Roy Williams OBE paid tribute to him at the 2024 ceremony. Yvonne Brewster OBE passed away in October 2025; tributes were paid to her at the 2025 ceremony by playwright Pat Cumper, Talawa Theatre Company Artistic Director Michael Buffong, and Trustee Olusola Oyeleye.

== Other awards ==
=== Roland Rees Bursary ===
The Roland Rees Bursary was inaugurated in 2015 in memory of Roland Rees, a co-founder and the first chair of the Alfred Fagon Award (1997–2009), who died in September 2015. Rees was a theatre director who co-founded Foco Novo, one of the earliest innovative touring fringe theatre companies in the UK, and had directed three of Alfred Fagon's plays during his lifetime. The bursary is funded by a legacy from the Roland Rees estate and awards £3,000 annually to a playwright to enable them to devote more time to their writing. It is awarded by the trustees rather than through open submission.

=== Mustapha Matura Award and Mentoring Programme ===
The Mustapha Matura Award and Mentoring Programme was inaugurated in 2021 as part of the award's 25th anniversary celebrations, in memory of Mustapha Matura (1939–2019), the Trinidadian-born playwright who was a co-founder of the Alfred Fagon Award. Matura died in October 2019. The award is open to newly emerging Black playwrights of Caribbean or African descent aged 25 and under, and comprises a £3,000 cash prize and a nine-month mentoring programme with a leading Black British playwright. It is supported by the Estate of Mustapha Matura, the Garrick Charitable Trust, and The Henry and Mary Kent Trust.

The three awards — the Mustapha Matura Award, the Roland Rees Bursary, and the Alfred Fagon Award — are named in honour of three figures who were contemporaries, friends, and supporters of each other's work: Matura encouraged Fagon to write, Rees directed both Matura's and Fagon's early plays, and together they helped establish the award that bears Fagon's name.

=== Audience Award ===
An Audience Award, voted for by the public, ran for three years from 2015 to 2017.

== Winners ==
The winner of Best New Play of the Year is indicated in bold and highlighted in gold. Shortlisted entries are highlighted in light blue. Longlisted entries are unhighlighted. Shortlists and longlists are available from 2015 onwards; earlier years list the winner only.

Year	Playwright	Play	Result
1997	**Roy Williams**	**Starstruck**	**Winner**
1998	**Shenagh Cameron**	**A Pocket in the Sky**	**Winner**
1999	**Sheila White**	**Maids**	**Winner**
1999	**Grant Buchanan-Marshall**	**The Prayer**	**Winner**
2000	**Adeshegun Ikoli**	**Surprise Surprise**	**Winner**
2001	**Linda Brogan**	**The Well**	**Winner**
2001	**Penny Saunders**	**Never Never**	**Winner**
2002	**Trevor Williams**	**Talkin' Loud**	**Winner**
2003	**Marcia Layne**	**Off Camera**	**Winner**
2004	**Michael Abbensetts**	**The Good Doctor's Son**	**Winner**
2005	**Michael Bhim**	**Daydreams of Hailey**	**Winner**
2006	**Lorna French**	**Safe House**	**Winner**
2007	**Allia V Oswald**	**Dirty Water**	**Winner**
2008	**Paula B. Stanic**	**What's Lost**	**Winner**
2009	**Oladipo Agboluaje**	**Iya-Ile**	**Winner**
2010	**Roy Williams**	**Sucker Punch**	**Winner**
2010	**Rachel De-lahay**	**SW11**	**Winner**
2011	**Levi David Addai**	**Blacklands**	**Winner**
2012	**Michaela Coel**	**Chewing Gum Dreams**	**Winner**
2013	**Diana Nneka Atuona**	**Liberian Girl**	**Winner**
2014	**Charlene James**	**Cuttin' It**	**Winner**
2015	**Theresa Ikoko**	**Girls**	**Winner**
2015	David Judge	Skipping Rope	Shortlisted
2015	Deidan Williams	Manhattan Out to Sea	Shortlisted
2015	Eva Edo	Looked After Children	Shortlisted
2015	Tolula Dada	Carrot or Stick	Shortlisted
2015	Andrew Rajan	Afghanistan	Longlisted
2015	Beverley Andrews	Circles	Longlisted
2015	Chantal Campbell	Playing Tom	Longlisted
2015	Dianna Hunt	Mona's Room	Longlisted
2015	Edson Burton	Icarus in Love	Longlisted
2015	Matilda Ibini	Elector8	Longlisted
2015	Max Kolaru	Not Cricket	Longlisted
2015	May Sumbwanyambe	After Independence	Longlisted
2015	Rayna Campbell	Manchester Divided	Longlisted
2015	Rex Obano	The Moors of England	Longlisted
2015	Roy Williams	The Fear	Longlisted
2015	Simon Michael Brett	White House	Longlisted
2015	Trevor Williams	Killing Time	Longlisted
2015	Yasmin Joseph	Pinch	Longlisted
2016	**Lorna French**	**City Melodies**	**Winner**
2016	Max Kolaru	Traffick Jam	Shortlisted
2016	Natasha Marshall	Half Breed	Shortlisted
2016	Annette Brook	Gala Mae	Longlisted
2016	Beverly Andrews	Awa's Journey	Longlisted
2016	Edd Muruako	Magnetic	Longlisted
2016	Emma Dennis-Edwards	The Yard	Longlisted
2016	Kalungi Ssebandeke	ASSATA: She Who Struggles	Longlisted
2016	Liz Mytton	Red Snapper	Longlisted
2016	Lola Olarewaju	Bastard Child	Longlisted
2016	Michelle Inniss	She Called Me Mother	Longlisted
2016	Mufaro Makubika	Miracles	Longlisted
2016	Patrice Etienne	Mum	Longlisted
2016	Somalia Seaton	Fall of the Kingdom Rise of the Foot Soldier	Longlisted
2017	**Mufaro Makubika**	**Shebeen**	**Winner**
2017	Archie Maddocks	Nine Nights	Shortlisted
2017	David Judge	SparkPlug	Shortlisted
2017	Inua Ellams	Barber Shop Chronicles	Shortlisted
2017	Melanie Pennant	A Black Fella Walks into a Bar	Shortlisted
2017	Adura Onashile	Expensive S***	Longlisted
2017	Gabriel Gbadamosi	Stop & Search	Longlisted
2017	Max Kolaru	24 Grenfell Storey's	Longlisted
2017	Tife Kusoro	We Have Sinned	Longlisted
2018	**Winsome Pinnock**	**Rockets and Blue Lights**	**Winner**
2018	Chinonyerem Odimba	Princess & The Hustler	Shortlisted
2018	David Judge	PanLid	Shortlisted
2018	Dexter Flanders	Foxes	Shortlisted
2018	Tife Kusoro	Butterfly	Shortlisted
2018	Abraham Adeyemi	These Minging Streets	Longlisted
2018	Ben Tagoe	When We Were Brothers	Longlisted
2018	Mahad Ali	My Brother's Keeper	Longlisted
2018	Olivia Hannah	Braids	Longlisted
2019	**Jasmine Lee-Jones**	**Seven Methods of Killing Kylie Jenner**	**Winner**
2019	Carmen Harris	Foreign	Shortlisted
2019	Nick Makoha	The Dark	Shortlisted
2019	Nicôle Lecky	Superhoe	Shortlisted
2019	Ryan Calais Cameron	Retrograde	Shortlisted
2019	Tonderai Munyevu	Comrades, Mugabe, My Dad and Me	Shortlisted
2019	Archie Maddocks	Pan on the Tyne	Longlisted
2019	Juliet Gilkes Romero	State of the Union	Longlisted
2019	Nicole Latchana	OCO-2	Longlisted
2019	Patricia Cumper	Red Dirt	Longlisted
2019	Roy Williams and Clint Dyer	Death of England	Longlisted
2019	Tolula Dada	Marry or Burn	Longlisted
2019	Tyrell Williams	Red Pitch	Longlisted
2020	**Juliet Gilkes Romero**	**The Whip**	**Winner**
2020	babirye bukilwa	...blackbird hour	Shortlisted
2020	Clint Dyer and Roy Williams	Death of England: Delroy	Shortlisted
2020	Daniel Ward	The Canary & The Crow	Shortlisted
2020	Emma Dennis-Edwards	BRICKS	Shortlisted
2020	JC Niala	Unsettled	Shortlisted
2020	Chantelle Dusette	EV(E)OLUTION	Longlisted
2020	Esohe Uwadiae	She Is A Place Called Home	Longlisted
2020	Inua Ellams	Three Sisters	Longlisted
2020	Lewis Charlesworth	Token	Longlisted
2020	Nicole Latchana	The Process	Longlisted
2020	Phoebe McIntosh	The Soon Life	Longlisted
2020	Ronke Adékoluẹjo	Teleportation	Longlisted
2020	Wela Mbusi	A Far Cry From Home	Longlisted
2021	**Mojisola Adebayo**	**Family Tree**	**Winner**
2021	Benedict Lombe	Lava	Shortlisted
2021	Dipo Baruwa-Etti	The Sun, the Moon, and the Stars	Shortlisted
2021	Louisa Hayford	AHEMMAA (QUEENS)	Shortlisted
2021	Somebody Jones	HOW I LEARNED TO SWIM	Shortlisted
2021	Zodwa Nyoni	The Darkest Part of the Night	Shortlisted
2021	babirye bukilwa	...cake	Longlisted
2021	Faith Omole	My Father's Fable	Longlisted
2021	Kalungi Ssebandeke	Water Made For Giants	Longlisted
2021	Rex Obano	The Hamlet Voyage	Longlisted
2021	Shenagh Cameron	Turpentine & Tobacco	Longlisted
2022	**Hannah Shury-Smith**	**Go Back Home!**	**Winner**
2022	Hannah Rose Caton	The Bridge Between You and Everything	Shortlisted
2022	Kwame Owusu	Dreaming and Drowning	Shortlisted
2022	Beru Tessema	House of Ife	Longlisted
2022	Catherine Bisset	Placeholder	Longlisted
2022	Chukwudi Onwere	Deptford Baby	Longlisted
2022	Lakesha Arie-Angelo	Runaway Bay	Longlisted
2023	**Faith Omole**	**Kaleidoscope**	**Winner**
2023	Coral Wylie	Lavender, Hyacinth, Violet, Yew.	Shortlisted
2023	Esohe Uwadiae	Pots and Pans and Prayers	Shortlisted
2023	John Rwothomack	Never Look Back	Shortlisted
2023	Lanre Malaolu	Samskara	Shortlisted
2023	Shona Bukola Babayemi	boxes	Shortlisted
2023	Tia-Renee Mullings	Little Angela Davis	Shortlisted
2023	Daniel Rusteau	Dismissed	Longlisted
2023	Joy Gharoro-Akpojotor	The Immigrant Joy	Longlisted
2024	**Inua Ellams**	**Once Upon A Time in Sokoto**	**Winner**
2024	Azuka Oforka	The Women of Llanrumney	Shortlisted
2024	Jason David	Art Boy	Shortlisted
2024	Max Kolaru	Alphabet Spaghetti	Shortlisted
2024	Natasha Cottriall	HOME	Shortlisted
2024	Tife Kusoro	The Last Black Girl on Earth	Shortlisted
2024	JC Niala	1918	Longlisted
2024	Mahad Ali	The Fall of Radley Road	Longlisted
2024	Robert Awosusi	Black Power Playlist	Longlisted
2024	Sasha Frost	Froggy	Longlisted
2024	Steven Kavuma	Todduka	Longlisted
2024	Tamzin Murray	Doughnuts and Ice Cream	Longlisted
2025	**Harry Mould**	**The Brenda Line**	**Winner**
2025	Lanre Malaolu	Now I See	Shortlisted
2025	Mahad Ali	The Spin Room	Shortlisted
2025	Ntombizodwa Nyoni	Liberation	Shortlisted
2025	Yasmine Dankwah	rite to party	Shortlisted
2025	Asa Haynes	The Attack of the 50ft Black Woman	Longlisted
2025	Kaleb D'Aguilar	How to Keep Warm in Winter	Longlisted
2025	Lettie Precious	12 Letters To My Name	Longlisted
2025	Llyrio Boateng	A False Friend	Longlisted

== Legacy and published works ==
The Alfred Fagon Award has played a significant role in nurturing Black British playwrights who have gone on to major careers in theatre, film and television. Several winning and shortlisted plays have been published by leading drama publishers and gone on to productions at the National Theatre, the Royal Shakespeare Company, the Royal Court Theatre and in the West End.

=== Winners ===
Roy Williams, the inaugural winner in 1997 and winner again in 2010 for Sucker Punch, is among the most produced Black British playwrights of his generation. Sucker Punch, which starred a then-unknown Daniel Kaluuya in its 2010 Royal Court Theatre production, was published by Methuen Drama in 2011 and later issued as a Methuen Drama Modern Classic in 2015.

Oladipo Agboluaje's 2009 winning play Iya-Ile (The First Wife) was nominated for an Olivier Award and later included in his Plays One collection, published by Oberon Books in 2014.

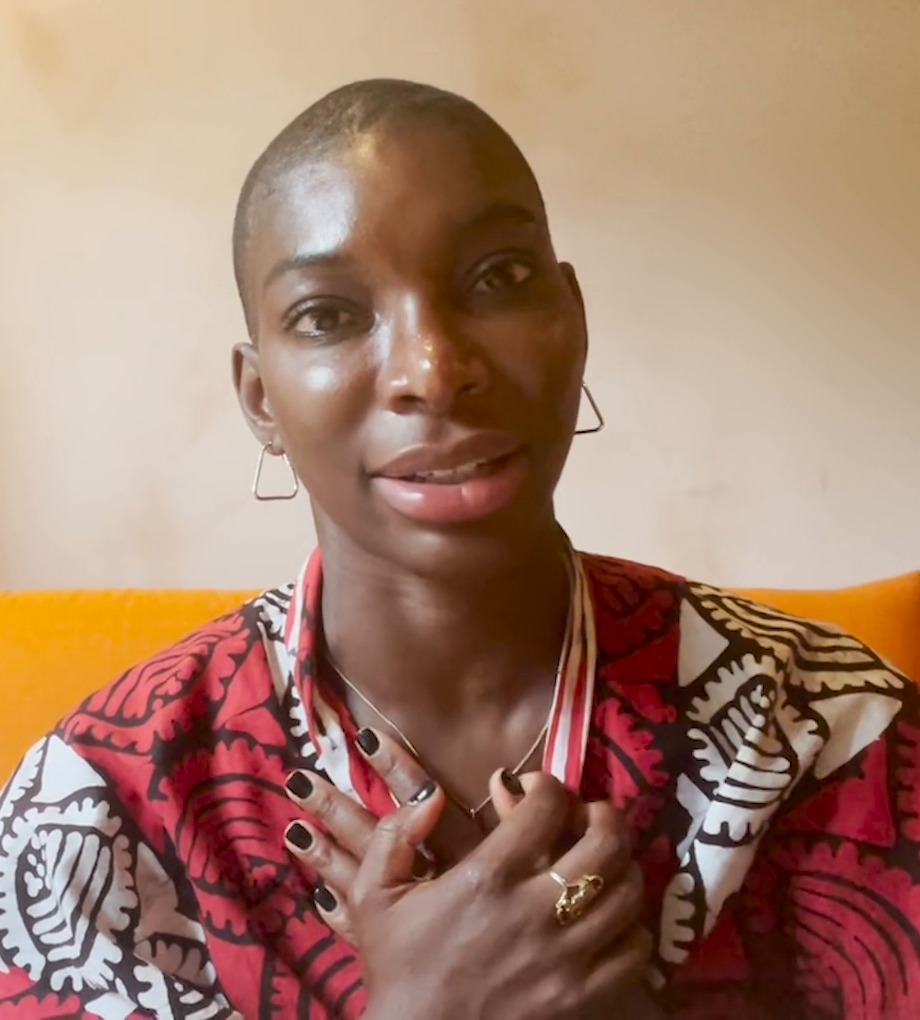
Michaela Coel, whose 2012 winning play Chewing Gum Dreams launched a career that included Emmy and BAFTA wins.

Michaela Coel's 2012 winning play Chewing Gum Dreams, written and performed by Coel as her graduation production at the Guildhall School of Music and Drama, was published by Oberon Books in 2013 and later reissued by Methuen Drama. It served as the basis for her BAFTA-winning Channel 4 series Chewing Gum (2015–2017) and launched a career that went on to include the BBC/HBO series I May Destroy You (2020), for which Coel became the first Black woman to win the Primetime Emmy Award for Outstanding Writing for a Limited or Anthology Series or Movie.

Diana Nneka Atuona's 2013 winning play Liberian Girl was published by Methuen Drama.

Charlene James's 2014 winning play Cuttin' It, addressing female genital mutilation in Britain, won the George Devine Award, the Critics' Circle Theatre Award and the UK Theatre Award for Best New Play, and was adapted for BBC Audio Drama.

Theresa Ikoko's 2015 winning play Girls was published by Methuen Drama and produced by Talawa Theatre Company, HighTide Theatre and Soho Theatre in 2016. Ikoko went on to co-write the BAFTA-nominated film Rocks (2019).

Juliet Gilkes Romero's 2020 winning play The Whip, which explored the financial legacy of the 1833 Slavery Abolition Act, was produced by the Royal Shakespeare Company at the Swan Theatre in 2020 and published by Oberon Books. Gilkes Romero also received the Roland Rees Bursary in 2019.

Mojisola Adebayo's 2021 winning play Family Tree, about the medical legacy of Henrietta Lacks, was published by Methuen Drama in 2023.

Jasmine Lee-Jones's 2019 winning play seven methods of killing kylie jenner, which premiered at the Royal Court Theatre, was published by Oberon Books in 2019 and later reissued by Methuen Drama as a Student Edition. In 2023, Lee-Jones became the youngest ever recipient of the Windham-Campbell Prize.

=== Shortlisted plays ===
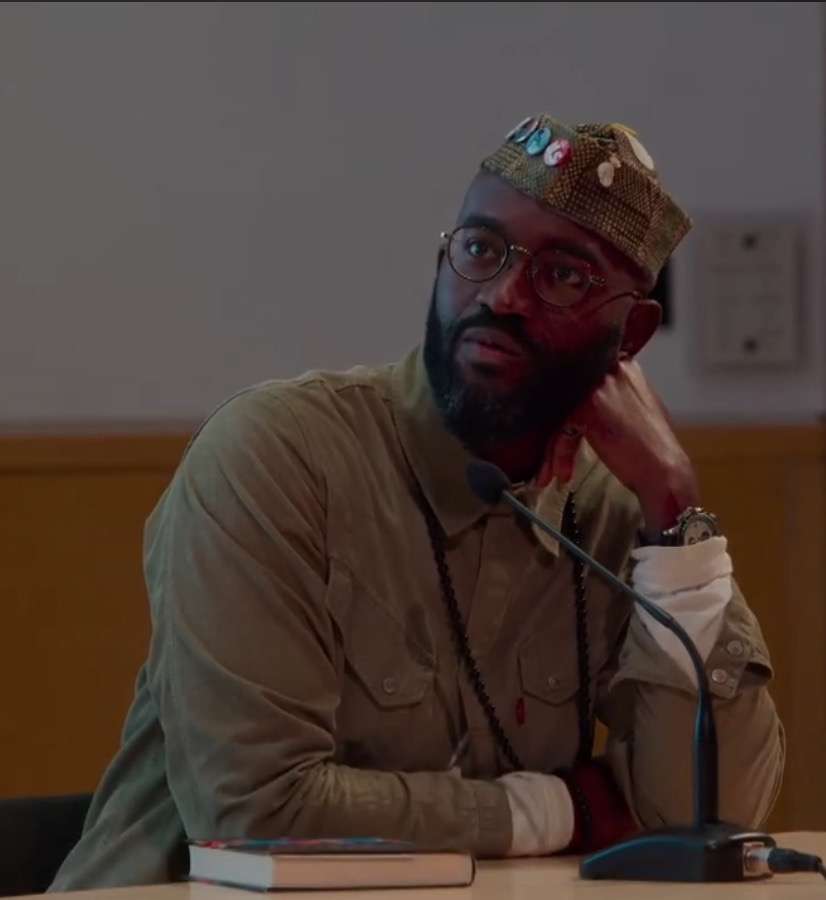
Inua Ellams's play Barber Shop Chronicles was shortlisted in 2017 before he won the AFA in 2024 for Once Upon A Time in Sokoto.

Inua Ellams's Barber Shop Chronicles, shortlisted in 2017, was produced by the National Theatre, Fuel Theatre and Leeds Playhouse and has toured internationally. It is published by Oberon Books and as a Methuen Drama Student Edition with commentary by Oladipo Agboluaje. Ellams won the AFA outright in 2024 for Once Upon a Time in Sokoto.

Chinonyerem Odimba's Princess & The Hustler, shortlisted in 2018, was published by Nick Hern Books in 2019 and is a set text for AQA GCSE English Literature.

Nicôle Lecky's Superhoe, shortlisted in 2019, was published by Nick Hern Books in 2019. It was adapted by Lecky into the BBC Three series Mood (2022), which won two BAFTA awards including Best Mini-Series.

Dexter Flanders's Foxes, shortlisted in 2018, was published by Methuen Drama. The play transferred to Seven Dials Playhouse in the West End in 2022 and to New York's 59E59 Theatre as part of Brits off Broadway in 2023.

Dipo Baruwa-Etti's The Sun, the Moon, and the Stars, shortlisted in 2021, was published by Faber.

Benedict Lombe's Lava, shortlisted in 2021, was published by Nick Hern Books. It won the Susan Smith Blackburn Prize in 2022, making Lombe the first playwright to win the prize for a debut play. Her follow-up play Shifters transferred to the Duke of York's Theatre in the West End in 2024, making Lombe the third ever Black British woman to have a play staged in the West End.

Zodwa Nyoni's The Darkest Part of the Night, shortlisted in 2021, was published by Methuen Drama and ranked by The Independent among the best plays of 2022.

babirye bukilwa's ...cake, shortlisted for the 2021 award, was published by Nick Hern Books.

Kwame Owusu's Dreaming and Drowning, shortlisted in 2022, was published by Nick Hern Books. It won the Mustapha Matura Award and the RSC 37 Plays Competition.

Beru Tessema's House of Ife, longlisted in 2022, was produced at the Bush Theatre and published by Concord Theatricals.

Tonderai Munyevu's Comrades, Mugabe, My Dad and Me, shortlisted in 2019, was produced by English Touring Theatre and York Theatre Royal and won the UK Theatre Award for Best New Play in 2022. It was also released as an Audible Original.

Ryan Calais Cameron's Retrograde, shortlisted in 2019, was published by Methuen Drama. Originally developed as a staged reading in 2019 and premiered at the Kiln Theatre in 2023, the play transferred to the Apollo Theatre in the West End in 2025, produced by Colman Domingo.

Azuka Oforka's The Women of Llanrumney, shortlisted in 2024, was produced at Sherman Theatre in Cardiff and Theatre Royal Stratford East in London and saw sold-out performances. Oforka went on to jointly win The Stage Debut Award for Best Writer in 2024 with this play.

=== Longlisted plays ===
May Sumbwanyambe's After Independence, longlisted in 2015 and winner of the Alfred Fagon Audience Award in 2016, was published by Methuen Drama in 2016. It was produced by Papatango Theatre Company at the Arcola Theatre and later adapted for BBC Radio 4.

Rex Obano's The Hamlet Voyage, longlisted in 2021, was produced by ReVerse Theatre Company.

Faith Omole's My Father's Fable, longlisted in 2021, was published by Nick Hern Books. Omole subsequently won the Alfred Fagon Award outright in 2023 for Kaleidoscope.

Catherine Bisset's Placeholder, longlisted in 2022, was published by Salamander Street.

JC Niala's 1918, longlisted in 2024, draws on the history of allotments and was developed in association with the Museum of English Rural Life at the University of Reading.

Lettie Precious's 12 Letters to My Name, longlisted in 2025, received a work-in-progress production at Bristol Old Vic and was subsequently produced by Graeae Theatre Company and Sheffield Theatres.

Lanre Malaolu's Samskara, shortlisted in 2023, was published by Nick Hern Books in 2022. It sold out its run at The Yard Theatre and was ranked among the best plays of 2021 by The Guardian and The Stage.

Tyrell Williams's Red Pitch, longlisted in 2019, was published by Nick Hern Books in 2022. It premiered at the Bush Theatre in 2022 and transferred to SohoPlace theatre in 2023. Unprecedentedly, Red Pitch earned Williams nominations for both the Best Play and Most Promising Playwright categories at the Evening Standard Theatre Awards in 2022, winning him the latter.

== See also ==
- Laurence Olivier Awards
- Black British Theatre Awards
- George Devine Award
- Susan Smith Blackburn Prize
- Windham-Campbell Prize
- Talawa Theatre Company
- Tiata Fahodzi
- Alfred Fagon
