= Oberon Books =

British publishing company

- Parent company: Bloomsbury Publishing
- Founded: 1985
- Founder: James Hogan
- Country of origin: United Kingdom
- Headquarters location: Islington, London
- Distribution: Marston Book Services (UK); Theatre Communications Group (United States); Currency Press (Australia)
- Publication types: Books
- Nonfiction topics: Drama and performing arts
- No. of employees: 10
- Official website: oberonbooks.com

Oberon Books is a London-based publisher of drama texts and books on theatre. The company publishes around 100 titles per year, many of them plays by new writers. In addition, the list contains a range of titles on theatre studies, acting, writing and dance.

== History ==
Oberon Books was founded by James Hogan in 1985. Two of its titles are poet Adrian Mitchell's 1998 stage adaptation of C. S. Lewis's The Lion, The Witch and The Wardrobe for the Royal Shakespeare Company and One Man, Two Guvnors (Richard Bean's modern version of Carlo Goldoni's Servant of Two Masters), a West End and Broadway hit for Britain's National Theatre in 2011 starring James Corden. The NT Live recording of the latter was scheduled to be shown on PBS in late 2020.

As of August 2019 the company has 1600 titles in print, most available as both print and e-books. As well as new plays, Oberon also publishes classic works by playwrights such as J. B. Priestley, Sir Arnold Wesker and Henrik Ibsen.

Oberon's mission expanded to include publishing a "culturally and politically diverse" range of plays. Recent examples include Barber Shop Chronicles by Inua Ellams, The HIV Monologues by Patrick Cash and Chewing Gum Dreams by Michaela Coel.

In December 2019, Oberon Books was acquired by Bloomsbury Publishing to join its longstanding play and performance imprints Methuen Drama and Arden Shakespeare.

== Notable contemporary authors ==
- Abi Morgan
- Oladipo Agboluaje
- Howard Barker
- Neil Bartlett
- Richard Bean
- Torben Betts
- Ranjit Bolt
- Tim Crouch
- Will Eno
- Alex Finlayson
- Lara Foot
- Jon Fosse
- John Fraser
- Christopher Fry
- Pam Gems
- A. C. Grayling
- Stephen Adly Guirgis
- Tanika Gupta
- Sir Peter Hall
- Dennis Kelly
- Nicolas Kent
- Arthur Kopit
- Bernard Kops
- Bryony Lavery
- Nell Leyshon
- John Logan
- Robert David MacDonald
- Mustapha Matura
- Glyn Maxwell
- Sheridan Morley
- Dominique Morisseau
- Virginia McKenna
- Dorota Masłowska
- Douglas Maxwell
- John Mortimer
- Richard Norton-Taylor
- Meredith Oakes
- Tamsin Oglesby
- John Osborne
- Gary Owen
- Julia Pascal
- Michael Pennington
- Barry Reckord
- Anya Reiss
- Roland Schimmelpfennig
- Roy Smiles
- Ade Solanke
- Aurin Squire
- Laura Wade
- Anne Washburn
- Sir Arnold Wesker
- Anna Zeigler

== Theatre group partners ==
Oberon also publishes plays from the following theatre companies:

- Kneehigh Theatre
- Complicité
- OperaUpClose
- Out of Joint
- The Red Room Theatre Company

== Critical acclaim and awards ==
John Logan's Red was the winner of six Tony Awards in 2010, including Best Play and Best Direction (Michael Grandage). Red was also the winner of the 2010 Drama Desk Award for Outstanding Play. The following Oberon plays were also nominated for Olivier Awards in 2010:

- Ìyà Ilé (The First Wife) by Oladipo Agboluaje nominated for Outstanding Achievement in an Affiliate Theatre
- Afghanistan: The Great Game by various authors, nominated for Outstanding Achievement in an Affiliate Theatre
- England People Very Nice by Richard Bean, nominated for Best New Comedy
- Our Class by Tadeusz Slobodzianek, nominated for Best Director for Bijan Sheibani

A number of Oberon playwrights have been nominated for the 2010 Evening Standard Awards:

- Richard Bean's The Big Fellah for Best New Play.
- Laura Wade's Posh for Best New Play.
- Anya Reiss and Atiha Sen Gupta, both nominated for the Charles Wintour Award for Most Promising Playwright

Nominees for the 2010 TMA Theatre Awards include:

- Mrs Reynolds and the Ruffian by Gary Owen for Best New Play.
- Spur of the Moment by Anya Reiss for Best New Play.
- "Kursk" by Bryony Lavery for Best Touring Production.

Oberon's previous award winners include:

- A Disappearing Number by Simon McBurney and Complicité, winner of both the Evening Standard Award and the Olivier Award for Best New Play in 2008
- Bloody Sunday: Scenes from the Saville Inquiry by Richard Norton-Taylor, winner of the Olivier Award for Outstanding Achievement in an Affiliate Theatre in 2006
- Nell Leyshon, winner of the Evening Standard Award for Most Promising Playwright for Comfort Me With Apples in 2005
- Torben Betts, winner of the Critics' Award for Theatre in Scotland for Best New Play with The Unconquered, 2007.

== John Osborne discovery ==
In September 2008 two early playscripts by John Osborne, previously thought to be lost, were discovered in the British Library's archives. Both plays predated Look Back in Anger and were published together for the first time by Oberon Books, as Before Anger.
