= Diana Nneka Atuona =

Nigerian-British playwright

- Born: 1983 (age 42–43); Peckham, London
- Education: London South Bank University
- Occupation: Playwright
- Writing career
- Notable works: Liberian Girl; Trouble in Butetown
- Notable awards: Alfred Fagon Award (2013); George Devine Award (2019)

Diana Nneka Atuona (born 29 September) is a Nigerian-British playwright from Peckham, London. She is known for her plays Liberian Girl and Trouble in Butetown, both receiving critical acclaim.

== Early life and education ==
Atuona grew up in a big family in Peckham, London. She was the third of six children born to her Nigerian parents who had moved to the UK in the 1970s. She has spoken about her interest in writing in her childhood, notably writing a play for her church aged only 11 or 12. Atuona has credited a production of Blood Brothers that she saw as a teenager with sparking her interest in the theatre. However, her "traditional African" parents did not encourage her interest in the arts, preferring that she pursued a more traditional career.

At the same time, Atuona also developed a strong sense of justice in her childhood, especially after seeing the Free Nelson Mandela Concert on television. She went on to volunteer for various community and charity projects and was politically engaged. Atuona studied international politics at London South Bank University before winning a scholarship from Gray's Inn to study law at BPP University. However, she did not complete her legal training, deciding to instead follow her passion for writing.

== Career ==
Before finding success as a playwright, Atuona worked as an usher at various theatres, including The Old Vic and Royal Court Theatre's pop-up in her native Peckham. She also interned at Royal Court and joined the theatre's writing group following her stint as an usher.

Atuona's first play, Liberian Girl, won the Alfred Fagon Award (2013). Encouraged by this success, she approached the charity War Child and was offered to have the play presented at the Global Summit to End Sexual Violence in Conflict. Taking place in 2014, the summit was chaired by William Hague, then Secretary of State for Foreign and Commonwealth Affairs, and Angelina Jolie, in her capacity as Special Envoy for the UN High Commissioner for Refugees. Royal Court Theatre produced a staged reading of Liberian Girl for the summit in 2014, as well as giving the play a full stage production in its venue the following year. The play received widespread acclaim among critics, earning Atuona nominations in the Evening Standard Award as Most Promising Playwright and the Writers' Guild Award for Best New Play. The stage production was also a joint winner of the Alfred Fagon Audience Award in 2015.

Atuona's second play, The Boy from Tiger Bay, won the George Devine Award in 2019. She went on to receive funding from the Roland Rees Bursary and Theatre Royal Haymarket’s Writer Award in 2021, which enabled her to further develop the script. Under a new title, Trouble in Butetown, the play was produced at London's Donmar Warehouse in February 2023. It follows a black American G.I. who finds himself in the multicultural surroundings of Butetown, Cardiff.

In 2025, Atuona was announced as one of four working-class playwrights commissioned by Ardent Theatre Company to write a 70-minute play under the umbrella title Our Country Now. The programme is set to premier in Autumn 2026 at Southwark Playhouse Borough, where it will have a five-week run, followed by a three-week regional tour.

== Works ==
=== Productions ===
Year	Title	Venue(s)	Note
2015	Liberian Girl	Royal Court Theatre (premiere); Bernie Grant Arts Centre; and CLF Arts Café, Peckham	
2015	Untitled	Royal Court Theatre pop-up, Pimlico	Audioplay, part of the Pimlico Playground series
2022	Changing Rooms	Pump House Theatre and Arts Centre; Lyric Theatre, Hammersmith; and Bristol Old Vic.	Short play; part of the Talking About A Revolution programme (curated by Tiata Fahodzi)
2023	Trouble in Butetown	Donmar Warehouse	

=== Published play texts ===
- Atuona, D. N. (2015). Liberian Girl (2nd ed.). London: Bloomsbury Publishing. ISBN 9781474276566.
- Atuona, D. N. (2023). Trouble in Butetown (1st ed.). London: Bloomsbury Publishing. ISBN 9781350386235.

== Awards and nominations ==
Year	Awards	Category	Result	Note
For Liberian Girl
2013	Alfred Fagon Award		Won	
2013	Bruntwood Prize for Playwriting		Longlisted	
2015	Evening Standard Theatre Awards	Charles Wintour Award for Most Promising Playwright	Nominated	
2015	Alfred Fagon Audience Award		Won	Joint winner with Play Mas (2015 revival) by Mustapha Matura and Matilda Ibini’s Muscovado
2016	Writers' Guild Award	Best New Play	Shortlisted	
For Trouble in Butetown
2019	George Devine Award		Won	Then titled The Boy from Tiger Bay

=== Bursaries and commissions ===
- 2015 - Jerwood New Playwright scheme (attachment with Royal Court Theatre)
- 2021 - Theatre Royal Haymarket’s Writer Award
- 2021 - Roland Rees Bursary
