= List of British playwrights since 1950 =

This is a list of British dramatists who wrote their plays in the 1950s or later.

== A–G ==
- Michael Abbensetts
- Rodney Ackland
- Jim Allen
- Karim Alrawi
- Jeffrey Archer
- John Arden
- Alan Ayckbourn
- Enid Bagnold
- John Roman Baker
- Howard Barker
- Peter Barnes
- Mike Bartlett
- Richard Bean
- Alistair Beaton
- Alan Bennett
- Steven Berkoff
- Tess Berry-Hart
- Torben Betts
- Alice Birch
- Alan Bleasdale
- Robert Bolt
- Edward Bond
- Leslie Bonnet
- John Griffith Bowen
- Howard Brenton
- Jon Brittain
- Moira Buffini
- Gregory Burke
- Margaret Busby
- Leo Butler
- Jez Butterworth
- Glyn Cannon
- Jim Cartwright
- James Martin Charlton
- Caryl Churchill
- Ray Cooney
- Noël Coward
- Lucinda Coxon
- Martin Crimp
- Patricia Cumper
- Sarah Daniels
- April De Angelis
- Shelagh Delaney
- William Douglas-Home
- Stuart Draper
- Nell Dunn

== E–K ==
- David Edgar
- Helen Edmundson
- David Eldridge
- Inua Ellams
- Ben Elton
- Kevin Elyot
- Tim Firth
- Michael Frayn
- Terence Frisby
- Christopher Fry
- Pam Gems
- Juliet Gilkes Romero
- John Godber
- Simon Gray
- Debbie tucker green
- Bonnie Greer
- David Greig
- Trevor Griffiths
- Nick Grosso
- Willis Hall
- Christopher Hampton
- David Hare
- Zinnie Harris
- Tony Harrison
- Ronald Harwood
- Sam Holcroft
- Dusty Hughes
- Stephen Jeffreys
- Ann Jellicoe
- Hywel John
- Catherine Johnson
- Terry Johnson
- Sarah Kane
- Barrie Keeffe
- Dennis Kelly
- Tom Kempinski
- Hanif Kureishi

== L–R ==
- Maeve Larkin
- Bryony Lavery
- Mike Leigh
- Sue Lenier
- Stephen Lowe
- Clare Lizzimore
- Sharman Macdonald
- John McGrath
- Tom McGrath
- Jenny McLeod
- Patrick Marber
- Tony Marchant
- Frank Marcus
- Derek Marlowe
- Mustapha Matura
- Deborah McAndrew
- David Mercer
- Anthony Minghella
- Adrian Mitchell
- Colin Morris
- John Mortimer
- Tom Morton-Smith
- Peter Morgan
- Chloe Moss
- Bill Naughton
- Anthony Neilson
- Peter Nichols
- William Nicholson
- Joe Orton
- John Osborne
- Gary Owen
- Paul O'Grady
- Louise Page
- Michael Pertwee
- Caryl Phillips
- Winsome Pinnock
- Harold Pinter
- Alan Plater
- Stephen Poliakoff
- Alan Pollock
- Dennis Potter
- David Pownall
- J.B. Priestley
- Peter Quilter
- Terence Rattigan
- Mark Ravenhill
- Dan Rebellato
- Lynn Redgrave
- Michael Redgrave
- Philip Ridley
- David Rudkin
- Willy Russell

== S–Z ==
- James Saunders
- Anthony Shaffer
- Peter Shaffer
- Ade Solanke
- Colin Spencer
- Simon Stephens
- Tom Stoppard
- David Storey
- C. P. Taylor
- Peter Terson
- Ben Travers
- Miles Tredinnick
- Peter Ustinov
- Laura Wade
- Michael Wall
- Phoebe Waller-Bridge
- Timberlake Wertenbaker
- Arnold Wesker
- Peter Whelan
- Hugh Whitemore
- Nigel Williams
- Roy Williams
- Snoo Wilson
- Charles Wood
- Nicholas Wright
- Benjamin Yeoh

== See also ==
- List of British playwrights
- List of playwrights
- List of Scottish dramatists
- Lists of writers
- Drama
- In-yer-face theatre
- Kitchen sink drama
- Theatre
- Stage play
