= George Devine Award =

Promising playwright award

- Type: Theatre Award
- Awarded for: New writing by a promising playwright
- Venue: Royal Court Theatre
- Country: United Kingdom
- Reward: £15,000
- Established: 1966
- First award: 1968
- Current winner: Martha Loader, for The Town
- Website: georgedevineaward.org

The George Devine Award for Most Promising Playwright was founded in 1966, named in honour of the dramatist George Devine (1910–1966), co-founder and inaugural artistic director of Royal Court Theatre.

== History ==
The George Devine Award was cofounded in 1966 by Jocelyn Herbert following George Devine's passing on 20 January 1966. Herbert was Devine's long time collaborator and colleague at Royal Court Theatre, as well as his partner since the late 1950s. A special performance was held on 13 June 1966 at The Old Vic to raise funds for the award. Its programme pamphlet sets out the fundraising target of £20,000 in order to create an annual award of at least £1,000. At the time, the award was open to "any promising or unproved playwright, director or designer". In addition to the fundraising performance, Herbert also sold Devine's records to University of Leeds's archive to acquire further funding for the award.

Today, the award is granted annually to early-career playwrights, with submissions judged by a panel made up of established playwrights, directors, and actors. As of 2025, winner of the award receives a cash prize of £15,000.

== Governance ==
Record from the Charity Commission for England and Wales showed that the award was officially registered as "George Devine Memorial Fund" in 1970, with a declaration of trust dated 18 August 1969. It was re-registered as "George Devine Memorial Award", a charitable incorporated organisation, in 2023. According to the 1966 fundraising performance pamphlet, the inaugural trustees of the fund were Herbert, alongside Neville Blond and Robin Fox. The award's current trustees include playwright and screenwriter Christopher Hampton and producer Matthew Byam Shaw.

== Effect on awardees' career ==
The award is considered to be prestigious in the British theatre industry. Diana Nneka Atuona, who won the award in 2019, credited the award's prestige with helping her attract venues willing to produce her winning play, which was eventually picked up by Donmar Warehouse. Similarly, Elinor Cook said that winning the award in 2013 "made people's ears prick up", helping her land an attachment with the National Theatre as well as a TV writing gig with BBC One.

Many of the award recipients have since achieved further successes in the theatre industry, with some also becoming prominent as writers for films and television. Mike Leigh, the winner in 1973, has since received several accolades in the film industry and was appointed an Officer of the Order of the British Empire (OBE) in the 1993 Birthday Honours. Peter Cox, who won the award in 1984, was made a Member of the Most Excellent Order of the British Empire (MBE) in the 2011 New Year Honours. Winning the award for Lift Off in 2000, Roy Williams received an OBE in the 2008 Birthday Honours and was elected as fellow of the Royal Society of Literature in 2018.

== Past winners and nominees ==
=== 2020s ===
Year	Winner	Special commendation	Shortlisted nominees
2025	Martha Loader, for The Town	—N/a	Asmara Gabrielle, for Bad Seed; Yasmin Joseph, for Citizens of Umi; Isla van Tricht, for The Knot
2024	Benjamin Kuffuor, for Working Men	Temi Majekodunmi, for Positive	Christopher Adams, for Progression; Stella Green, for The Book of Alice; Isabella Waldron, for Chatter.
2023	Tife Kusoro, for G	Ava Pickett, for 1536	Georgia Bruce, for Time, Like the Sea; Sami Ibrahim, for NGO; Shahid Iqbal Khan, for Djinnity; Somebody Jones, for How I Learned to Swim; Cordelia Lynn, for Witch Play; Bea Roberts, for Those Who (Are/Were) Left; Sam Ward, for Everything I'm Thinking All of the Time.
2022	Tyrell Williams, for Red Pitch	—N/a	Mojisola Adebayo, for Stars; Nathaniel Brimmer-Beller, for Blood Red Apples And Deep Gold Honey; Babirye Bukilwa, for The Master's House; Karim Khan, for Brown Boys Swim; Iman Qureshi, for The Ministry of Lesbian Affairs; Francesca Martinez, for All of Us; Joel Tan, for No Particular Order; Ruby Thomas, for Linck & Mulhähn
2021	Emily White, for Atlantis	—N/a	Travis Alabanza, for Overflow; Caroline Bird, for Red Ellen; Gareth Farr, for Shandyland; Sami Ibrahim, for Brick Shit House; Zodwa Nyoni, for The Darkest Part of Night; Lulu Raczka, for Close Your Eyes, and Think of England; Tom Stuart, for Burn Baby Burn
2020	Daniel Ward, for The Canary and the Crow	—N/a	Dipo Baruwa-Etti, for When Great Trees Fall; Chris Bush, for Motherland; Annie Jenkins, for Staying at Stacey's; Nyla Levy, for Does My Bomb Look Big In This?; Charley Miles, for There are no beginnings; Danusia Samal, for Out of Sorts; Nina Segal, for O, Island!; Temi Wilkey, for The High Table

=== 2010s ===
- 2019 - Diana Nneka Atuona, for The Boy from Tiger Bay
- 2018 - Simon Longman, for Gundog
- 2017 - Not awarded
- 2016 - Theresa Ikoko, for Girls; and Jane Upton, for All the Little Lights
- 2015 - Charlene James, for Cuttin' It
- 2014 - Alice Birch, for Revolt. She Said. Revolt Again.; and Rory Mullarkey, for The Wolf From the Door
- 2013 - Elinor Cook, for Pilgrims
- 2012 - Tom Wells, for Kitchen Sink
- 2011 - Penelope Skinner, for The Village Bike
- 2010 - Vivienne Franzmann, for Mogadishu

=== 2000s ===
- 2009 - Nick Payne, for If There Is I Haven't Found It Yet
- 2008 - Hassan Abdulrazzak, for Baghdad Wedding
- 2007 - Alexandra Wood, for The Eleventh Capital
- 2006 - Lucy Caldwell, for Leaves
- 2005 - Stuart Carolan, for Defender of the Faith; and Laura Wade, for Breathing Corpses
- 2004 - Lucy Prebble, for The Sugar Syndrome
- 2003 - Ché Walker, for Flesh Wound
- 2002 - Richard Bean, for Under the Whaleback; and Gary Owen, for The Drowned World
- 2001 - Leo Butler, for Redundant
- 2000 - Roy Williams OBE FRSL , for Lift Off; and Gary Mitchell, for The Force of Change

=== 1990s ===
- 1999 - Rebecca Gilman, for The Glory of Living; and Mark O'Rowe, for Howie the Rookie
- 1998 - Helen Blakeman, for Caravan
- 1997 - Conor McPherson, for St Nicholas; and Enda Walsh, for Disco Pigs
- 1996 - Martin McDonagh, for Beauty Queen of Leenane
- 1995 - Jez Butterworth, for Mojo
- 1994 - Judy Upton, for Ashes and Sand
- 1993 - Nicola Baldwin, for Confetti, and Jonathan Harvey, for Babies
- 1992 - James Stock, for Blue Night In The Heart Of The West
- 1991 - Winsome Pinnock, for Leave Taking
- 1990 - Billy Roche, for Poor Beast In The Rain

=== 1980s ===
- 1989 - Christina Reid, for The Belle of Belfast City
- 1988 - Nick Ward, for Apart from George
- 1987 - Charlotte Keatley, for My Mother Said I Never Should
- 1986 - Anne Devlin, for Ourselves Alone; and Jim Cartwright, for Road
- 1985 -
- 1984 - Peter Cox MBE, for Up to the Sun and Down to the Centre (Note: Cox himself recalled winning the award in 1983 instead of 1984 in an interview in 2023.)
- 1983 -
- 1982 - Louise Page, for Salonika; and Sarah Daniels, for Neaptide
- 1981 - Andrea Dunbar, for The Arbor ; Hanif Kureishi, for Outskirts and Borderline; and Michael Wilcox, for Accounts
- 1980 - Jonathan Gems, for The Tax Exile

=== 1970s ===
- 1979 - Nick Darke, for Never Say Rabbit in a Boat
- 1978 - Nick Wright, for Treetops; and Ron Hutchinson
- 1977 - Stephen Lowe, for Touched; and Robert Holman, for German Skerries
- 1976 -
- 1975 -
- 1974 -
- 1973 - Mike Leigh OBE
- 1972 - Wilson John Haire, for Within Two Shadows; David Williamson, for The Removalists; (Note: Some sources, such as this entry on Australian Screen Online, state that Williamson won the award in 1971 instead of 1972.) Mustapha Matura, for As Time Goes By; (Note: Some sources, such as Matura's official website and an article on WhatsOnStage.com (2010), claim that Matura won the award in 1971 instead of 1972.) and Michael Abbensetts, for Sweet Talk (Note: The Cambridge companion to British Black and Asian literature (1945–2010) by Deirdre Osborne (Cambridge University Press , 2016) listed this award being won by Abbensetts in 1973 instead of 1972.)
- 1971 - Heathcote Williams, for AC/DC; and Ted Whitehead, for The Foursome
- 1970 - Donald Howarth and John Antrobus

=== 1960s ===
- 1969 -
- 1968 - Edward Bond and Peter Gill

== See also ==
- Alfred Fagon Award
- Susan Smith Blackburn Prize
- Windham-Campbell Prize
- Black British Theatre Awards
- Laurence Olivier Awards
