= Juliet Gilkes Romero =

British journalist and playwright

- Romero in 2026
- Born: Juliet Gilkes; London
- Education: University of Brighton; Goldsmiths, University of London
- Occupations: Dramatist; screenwriter; lecturer
- Writing career
- Notable awards: Writers' Guild Award for Theatre Play (2009); Alfred Fagon Award (2020)
- Board member of: HighTide; The Film and Television Charity

Academic work
- Discipline: Creative writing
- Sub-discipline: Script writing
- Institutions: Goldsmiths, University of London; University of Birmingham; London South Bank University
- Website: julietgilkesromero.co.uk

Juliet Gilkes Romero, previously credited as Juliet Gilkes (IPA: /dʒɪlks/), is an English playwright and screenwriter, known for "politically charged" works that discuss British colonial history, Black British history, and slavery. Her accolades include the Writers' Guild Award for Theatre Play in 2009 and the Alfred Fagon Award in 2020. Romero was also known for her career in journalism, notably working as part of BBC World Service before entering the theatre industry.

== Early life and education ==
Romero was born in East London to a Barbadian father and a Trinidadian mother. She grew up in Trimley St Mary, Suffolk, having moved there with her family in the late 1970s. Her father worked for BT in Martlesham and her mother was a teacher, the first Black person in her profession in Suffolk. She has one brother.

Romero has credited her love of writing and storytelling to her parents, who brought her up with stories and books and who often took her to the theatre. She started writing from a young age, with one of her earliest works being a musical adaptation of Alice Through The Looking Glass.

Romero studied French and linguistics at University of Brighton.

== Career ==
=== Journalism ===
Romero joined the BBC in 1987 as a local radio news producer and reporter. As a journalist, she has worked as a foreign affairs reporter and producer for BBC World Service Radio and BBC World TV, reporting from countries including Ethiopia, Cuba, Haiti, and the Dominican Republic. She left the BBC in 2010 and continued to work as a freelance journalist, including for Sky News, before going full-time as a playwright. Romero has spoken openly about the lack of diversity in the field of journalism, as well as the challenges she faced as one of the few Black female journalists in the newsroom.

=== Scriptwriting ===
While still working as a journalist, Romero decided to pursue screenwriting, having previously written recreationally. She took a sabbatical to study Writing for Performance at Goldsmiths, University of London, earning a Master of Arts degree in 2001. She wrote her first play during the course and has since established a career in playwriting.

Romero is known as a playwright for "politically charged" productions. Romero sees her work as a way to inform the public of "how society has been formed by events omitted from our history books" and considers "unravel[ling] what has lain untold and buried for political expediency" a key mission for her as a writer. Her first short play, Bilad Al-Sudan, was written in response to the genocidal conflict in Darfur in 2006 and was staged at the Tricycle Theatre (now Kiln Theatre) as part of the How Long Is Never collection of short plays curated by Nicolas Kent. Romero's first full length production, At the Gates of Gaza (2008), follows the story of the British West Indies regiment after World War I. Most recently, her play The Whip (2020) explores the legacy of slavery.

Romero was a Writer in Residence at the National Theatre for the 2022/23 season within the New Works Department. In addition to writing plays, she has also written for radio and television.

==== At the Gates of Gaza (2008) ====
Romero wrote her first full length play, At the Gates of Gaza, as part of her MA course.

The play was produced at Birmingham Repertory Theatre in 2008 and won the Writers' Guild Award for Theatre Play the following year. The production also toured across the UK, including performances at Theatre Royal, Bury St Edmunds, New Wolsey Theatre, and Harrogate Theatre.

==== The Whip (2020) ====
The Whip examined the abolition of slavery in Britain, particularly in the lead up to the Slavery Abolition Act 1833 and the associated bailout of former slave owners - unknown to most members of the public until the publication of a (soon deleted) tweet from HM Revenue and Customs in 2018. The play was produced by Royal Shakespeare Company and premiered at the Swan Theatre in February 2020, though the run was unexpectedly cut short the following month due to the outbreak of COVID-19. An audio-drama production of the play was released on RSC's official YouTube channel in October 2020 to mark Black History Month. It was re-released the following January and remained available until 16 March 2021.

The Whip won the Alfred Fagon Award in 2020.

=== Academic career ===
Romero was appointed as a Creative Fellow at the University of Birmingham in 2018. She was a Royal Literary Fund fellow at London South Bank University from 2021 to 2023 and from 2024 to 2025. She is an associate lecturer of the MA Dramaturgy & Writing for Performance programme at Goldsmiths, her alma mater.

== Personal life ==
Romero resides in Sydenham, London. She is a trustee of The Film and Television Charity and HighTide, a theatre company in Suffolk, where she grew up.

== Writing credits ==
=== Plays ===
Year	Title	Venue(s)/ Production company	Note
2006	Bilad Al-Sudan	Tricycle Theatre	Part of the How Long Is Never collection in response to genocidal conflict in Darfur, Sudan
2008	At The Gates of Gaza	Birmingham Repertory Theatre and UK tour	
2015	Upper Cut	Southwark Playhouse	
2018	Razing Cane	Stephen Joseph Theatre	Rehearsed reading; previously shortlisted for the Alfred Fagon Award in 2013
2018	Day of The Living	The Other Place, Royal Shakespeare Company	Co-written with Darren Clark and Amy Draper
2020	The Whip	The Swan Theatre, Royal Shakespeare Company	
2020	The gift (in the 15 Heroines series)	Jermyn Street Theatre; filmed for online streaming	A retelling of Medea

=== Television ===
Year	Title	Channel / Network(s)	Note
2019	Soon Gone: A Windrush Chronicle	BBC Four	Episode 4 - Yvonne (1981)

=== Audio drama ===
Year	Title	Network	Note
2019	One Hot Summer	BBC Radio 4	

=== Published play texts ===
- Gilkes, Juliet A. (2007). "Bilad al Sudan". In Bhim, Michael (ed.). How long is never? Darfur, a response. London: Josef Weinberger Ltd. ISBN 978-0-85676-299-4.
- Romero, Juliet G. (2015). At the Gates of Gaza. Modern Plays. London: Oberon Books. ISBN 978-1-78319-173-4.
- Romero, Juliet G. (2015). Upper cut. Modern plays. London: Oberon Books. ISBN 978-1-78319-172-7.
- Clark, Darren; Draper, Amy; Romero, Juliet G. (2018). "Day of the Living". Making Mischief. Modern plays. London: Oberon Books. ISBN 978-1-78682-557-5.
- Romero, Juliet G. (2020). The Whip. Modern Plays. London: Oberon Books. ISBN 9781786828675.

== Awards and nominations ==
Year	Award	Category	Nominated work(s)	Result	Note
2009	Writers' Guild Award	Theatre Play	At the Gates of Gaza	Won	
2013	Alfred Fagon Award		Razing Cane	Shortlisted	
2019	The Roland Rees Bursary		—N/a	Won	
2019	Alfred Fagon Award		State of the Union	Longlisted	
2020	Alfred Fagon Award		The Whip	Won	
