= Ikoko =

Ikoko is a surname. Notable people with the surname include:

- Jordan Ikoko (born 1994), French-Congolese footballer
- Theresa Ikoko (fl. 2014), British playwright and screenwriter
