= Lorna French =

British playwright

- Occupation: Playwright
- Writing career
- Notable works: Safe House; City Melodies
- Notable awards: Alfred Fagon Award

Lorna French is a British playwright and the two-time winner of the Alfred Fagon Award for the best new play by a Black playwright of African or Caribbean descent living in the United Kingdom. Her Fagon Award winner plays are Safe House and City Melodies. French is of mixed Jamaican and Zimbabwean heritage.

== Career ==
French co-created the play These Four Walls with Naylah Ahmed, Sonali Bhattacharyya, Jennifer Farmer, Amber Lone and Cheryl Akila Payne. The play was commissioned by the Birmingham Repertory Theatre and was created based on interviews with those affected by the Lozells Riot in 2005.

She was a writer-in-residence at the New Wolsey Theatre in Ipswich in 2008–2009, and earned an MPhil in Playwriting from the University of Birmingham in 2011.

French won the 2016 Alfred Fagon Award for her play City Melodies, which explores the lives of first- and second-generation immigrants in London, and their perseverance in the face of adversity. She previously won the same award in 2006 for her play Safe House.

The Octagon Theatre has commissioned plays or scenes from Lorna French on two occasions. In 2016, they produced a stage version of To Kill a Mockingbird, and commissioned three playwrights to each write a scene that provided additional perspective on the play. French's scene introduces a new character, Tom Robinson's daughter, and a black parallel to Scout. Two years later, Octagon commissioned French and Janys Chambers to write a new stage adaptation of Charlotte Brontë's novel Jane Eyre; it premiered at the Octagon in January 2018.

She cites as influences Caryl Churchill, debbie tucker green, and Arthur Miller, as well as Toni Morrison and Sam Selvon.

== Plays ==
- Safe House, 2006
- Inside My Skin, 2008
- These Four Streets, 2009 [co-author]
- Positive, 2011
- City Melodies, 2016
- additional scene for To Kill a Mockingbird, 2016
- Jane Eyre, 2018 [co-adapter, with Janys Chambers]
