= Nicolas Kent =

British theatre director (born 1945)

- Born: 26 January 1945 (age 81)
- Education: Stowe School; St Catharine's College, Cambridge
- Occupation: Theatre director
- Years active: 1967–
- Awards: Freedom of the London Borough of Brent
- Website: nicolaskent.com

Nicolas Kent (born 26 January 1945) is a British theatre director. His father arrived in Britain in 1936, a Jewish German refugee, and changed his name from Kahn to Kent.

== Early life and education ==
Kent, who was brought up in Hampstead Garden Suburb, was educated at Stowe School from 1958 to 1963 and at St Catharine's College, Cambridge, where he read English from 1964 to 1967.

== Professional career ==
Kent began his career in theatre as a trainee director at the Liverpool Playhouse in 1967 and then worked from 1970 to 1972 at the Traverse Theatre in Edinburgh, before working for six years (from 1976 to 1982) as the administrative director of the Oxford Playhouse.

In 1984, he became artistic director of the Tricycle Theatre in Kilburn, and stood down from the role in 2012.

Kent's work at the Tricycle included verbatim political plays. Some of these were edited by Richard Norton-Taylor: Half the Picture examined the arms to Iraq inquiry, Tactical Questioning examined the inquiry into the death of Baha Mousa, and The Colour of Justice examined the Macpherson inquiry into the death of Stephen Lawrence. Kent also commissioned theatrical responses to the detentions at Guantánamo Bay, the 2011 London riots, and – in The Great Game – Britain's involvement in Afghanistan.

Under Kent's direction, the Tricycle also presented the London premieres of many Irish plays, such as Stones in His Pockets by Marie Jones, as well as staging productions with an emphasis on Afro-Caribbean experience, such as Mustapha Matura's Playboy of the West Indies, Lara Foot Newton's Karoo Moose and the Not Black and White trilogy (comprising new plays by Kwame Kwei-Armah, Roy Williams and Bola Agbaje). The theatre also saw the premieres of Kat and the Kings, a musical that won two Olivier Awards, and Patrick Barlow's adaptation of John Buchan's The Thirty-Nine Steps.

Kent chose to cease running the Tricycle following a £350,000 cut in the venue's annual artistic subsidy.

== Honours ==
In 2012, Kent became the first person to be awarded the freedom of the London Borough of Brent.
