= Marcia Layne =

British playwright

- Born: Coventry, UK
- Occupation: Playwright
- Awards: Alfred Fagon Award, 2003

Marcia Layne is a British playwright whose play Off Camera won the 2003 Alfred Fagon Award. The award honours the best new play by a playwright of Caribbean or African descent living in the United Kingdom. She is a writer and producer with Hidden Gem Productions in Yorkshire.

== Career ==
Layne's play The Yellow Doctress is a biographical play about Mary Seacole, a black Jamaican nurse struggling for acceptance during her service in the Crimean War. A touring production was performed for schoolchildren in Yorkshire by the West Yorkshire Playhouse in 2007. The title refers to the sobriquet Seacole earned for her work fighting a cholera outbreak during the war.

Layne wrote The Bag Lady, a one-woman play about Eve, a homeless woman who is a survivor of domestic violence. The play explores mental health, racial discrimination, and cultural identity. The play had its world premiere, starring Flo Wilson as Eve, at the Cellar Theatre in Huddersfield, and toured from 2013-2015.

In addition to stage plays, Layne has written radio dramas. Her 2010 radio play The Barber and the Ark was shortlisted for the Imison Award for Best Radio Drama Script by a new writer. The play tells the story of a man who goes to a barbershop to get his dreadlocks cut, and a barber to tells of his dream of finding the Ark of the Covenant in Ethiopia. She also wrote "A Cut Above", an episode of the radio drama Stone in which a detective investigates a suspected case of female genital mutilation and finds that no one is willing to talk with them.

In addition to her playwriting career, Layne has served as the Multicultural Officer at Sheffield Hallam University, and has worked as an Arts Officer in local government.

== Plays ==
- Off Camera, 2003
- The Yellow Doctress, 2007
- The Legacy
- The Barber and the Ark (radio play for BBC Radio 4), 2010
- Lost and Found, 2011
- Somebody's Son, 2012
- 20 Tiny Plays About Sheffield (contributor), 2013
- The Bag Lady, 2013
- "A Cut Above" (episode of radio drama Stone for BBC Radio 4), 2015
