= Tyrell Williams (dramatist) =

British playwright and screenwriter (born 1994)

- Born: 1994 (age 31–32); London
- Education: Middlesex University
- Occupations: Playwright; screenwriter; director
- Writing career
- Notable awards: George Devine Award (2022)

Tyrell Williams (born 1994) is a British playwright and screenwriter. He is known for co-creating the web series #HoodDocumentary, where the Internet meme Roll Safe originated. Williams's debut play, Red Pitch premiered at Bush Theatre in 2022 to critical acclaim and has since been produced in the West End as well as in the US.

== Early life and education ==
Tyrell Williams grew up London, on the Aylesbury Estate. He took part in a youth programme at Young Vic theatre when he was at secondary school, which was his first experience of the theatre industry. Williams went on to study creative writing and journalism at Middlesex University, graduating with a First class degree in 2015.

== Career ==
=== Television ===
Williams found early success with the web series #HoodDocumentary, which he co-created and cowrote with the actor and writer Kayode Ewumi. Initially self-released on YouTube in 2015, the mockumentary was so successful that it was picked up by BBC Three, with further episodes being released in 2016. In addition to writing, Williams also directed #HoodDocumentary. In addition to receiving millions of views, the show also led to the viral Roll Safe meme, created from a still of the main character of the show. More recently, Williams wrote for the Paramount+ and Apple TV series Time Bandits (2024) and was announced as a writer of Channel 4's upcoming series Schooled.

Williams was an alumnus of the BAFTA Elevate writer development programme's 2018 cohort.

=== Theatre ===
==== Debut play - Red Pitch ====
Williams's debut play, Red Pitch, started out as a 10-minute piece for the 2018 Young Harts Writers Festival at Lyric Theatre, Hammersmith, where it won the audience choice awards. The play was inspired by Williams's own experience of growing up in London and navigating the changes in his neighbourhood due to gentrification. Red Pitch was developed into a one-hour piece and was staged at OvalHouse theatre (now Brixton House) as part of its 2019 First Bites programme. The play was then picked up by Bush Theatre, where it enjoyed two successful runs in 2022 and 2023. The play won Williams the 2022 George Devine Award, where it was commended by the judging panel for "setting a scene of unforgettable atmosphere and character, using language with immense verve and flexibility, and telling a story that delivers a profound and particular emotional punch". Unprecedentedly, Williams was also nominated in both the Best Play and Most Promising Playwright categories at the Evening Standard Theatre Awards in 2022, winning the latter. Red Pitch was transferred to @sohoplace in the West End in 2024 and had its US premiere at the Olney Theatre Center in Maryland the following year.

==== Upcoming work ====
In 2022, Williams received a commission from Writers' Guild of Great Britain to write a new play titled Escalate, with Eleanor Lloyd Theatrical Productions Ltd as producing partner.

== Works ==
=== Television ===
| Year | Title | Channel(s)/Network(s) | Writer | Director | Note |
|---|---|---|---|---|---|
| 2015-2016 | #HoodDocumentary | BBC Three via YouTube | Yes | Yes | |
| 2024 | Time Bandits | Paramount+, Apple TV | Yes | No | Series 1, episode 6 |
| TBA | Schooled † | Channel 4 | Yes | No | |

== Awards and nominations ==
| Year | Awards | Category | Result |
For Red Pitch
| 2019 | Alfred Fagon Award | | Longlisted |
| 2022 | George Devine Award | | Won |
| 2022 | Evening Standard Theatre Awards | Best Play | Nominated |
| 2022 | Evening Standard Theatre Awards | Charles Wintour Award for Most Promising Playwright | Won |
| 2022 | The Stage Debut Awards | Best Writer | Won |
| 2023 | The Offies | Best Play | Won |
| 2023 | Critics' Circle Theatre Award | Most Promising Playwright | Won |
