= Playboy of the West Indies =

1984 play by Mustapha Matura

Playboy of the West Indies (1984) is a play by Trinidadian playwright Mustapha Matura, a Caribbean version of John Millington Synge's 1907 The Playboy of the Western World.

== Production history ==
Playboy of the West Indies opened in 1984 at the Oxford Playhouse, where it had been commissioned by Nicolas Kent, and the production subsequently toured the UK, finishing at the Tricycle Theatre in London. The original cast included Joy Richardson (as Alice), Jackie de Peza (Ivy), Frank Singuineau (Jimmy), Jim Findley (Ken), T-Bone Wilson (Mac), Mona Hammond (Mama Benin), Rudolph Walker (Mikey), Joan Ann Maynard (Peggy), Tommy Eytle (Phil), and Jason Rose (Stanley).

The play has also enjoyed much success in the United States, most notably at The Court Theatre, Chicago; Arena Stage, Washington, DC; New Jersey and Yale Rep. The Court Theatre Chicago's production was nominated for four Jefferson Awards. There was an extremely successful revival of the play at the Lincoln Center, New York, in 1993, directed by Gerald Gutierrez.

Matura also wrote a television adaptation of the play, screened on BBC2 in 1985.

A musical adaptation of the play created by Matura, Clement Ishmael, Dominique Le Gendre and Nicolas Kent opened at the Birmingham Repertory Theatre in June 2022 as part of the Birmingham 2022 Festival.

== Reception ==
The play has been called a "marvellous adaptation", and in 2004 it was revived at the Tricycle Theatre and the Nottingham Playhouse, in a well reviewed production by Nicolas Kent, who first directed the play 20 years earlier. Peter Hepple in The Stage stated: "Whereas Playboy of the Western World is recognised as a serious play, despite its comedy overtones, Mustapha Matura's Trinidadian version is all good humour. Possibly this is because its setting, a small fishing village, may have some significance to West Indians but to us it is simply a colourful background for this clever adaptation." Michael Billington wrote in The Guardian: "As comedy, Matura's version is hard to fault: he keeps all Synge's surprise entrances and adds to them his own 1950 period texture and joyous Creole dialogue...."
