= Yasmin Joseph =

British-Caribbean playwright and screenwriter

- Born: 1991 or 1992 (age 34–35); Camden, London
- Occupation: Playwright
- Writing career
- Notable work: J'Ouvert (2019)
- Notable awards: James Tait Black Prize (2020)

Yasmin Joseph is a British-Caribbean playwright and screenwriter. She is best known for her debut play J'Ouvert, which premiered at the fringe venue Theatre503 in 2019, before moving to the West End.

== Early life and education ==
Yasmin Joseph was born and raised in Camden, North London. She is of Caribbean heritage, with a Dominican-Jamaican mother and a Vincentian father. Her grandparents had come to the UK fas part of the Windrush Generation. One of her grandmothers worked as a nurse.

Joseph studied English and drama at university.

== Career ==
Before becoming a playwright, Joseph worked in a variety of roles in the theatre sector. In 2015, she interned at New York Theatre Workshop in audience outreach and engagement.

Joseph has credited her participation in Soho Theatre's Young Writers' Lab as her first experience with playwriting. Pinch, which she wrote during this time, was longlisted for the Alfred Fagon Award in 2015. Having previously worked as resident assistant producer at Theatre503, Joseph applied and was selected for the theatre's 503Five scheme, becoming one of its resident writers in 2017.

Joseph's debut play, J'Ouvert, was developed during this residency and subsequently premiered at Theatre503 in 2019. The production was transferred to the Harold Pinter Theatre in the West End in 2021, making Joseph the second Black British female playwright to have her work staged in the West End (after Natasha Gordon). J'ouvert was inspired by her childhood experiences, when her family was actively involved in creating carnival floats and taking part in the costume parade every summer. It was described by writer and educator Nicole-Rachelle Moore as an "educative and emotionally immersive piece of theatre".

Joseph has written for the Royal Court Theatre (as a winner of the Channel 4 Playwrights scheme), Soho Theatre, the Actors Touring Company, and Clean Break. She used her grandmother's experience as a nurse when she was hired by The Place Theatre in Bedford to write a drama based on memoirs compiled by the Retired Caribbean Nurses Association.

Joseph is an alumnus of Sister Pictures' writer-in-residence scheme. She has worked on writing screenplays, developing projects for Sister Pictures, and was a co-writer on the period drama series A Thousand Blows (released 2025 on Hulu and Disney +).

In 2022, Joseph contributed a poem, Who Said Summer Was Fun!, for the anthology Joyful Joyful: Stories Celebrating Black Voices, edited by Dapo Adeola and published by Pan MacMillan.

She is based in London.

== Writing credits ==
Key
†	Denotes films that have not yet been released

=== Plays ===
Year	Title	Notable production(s)	Notes
2015	Pinch	Unproduced	Longlisted for Alfred Fagon Award (2015)
2017	Do You Pray?	2017 - Theatre503 (Part of the "Rapid Write Response" programme)	Included in Routledge's anthology entitled Short Plays with Great Roles for Women (2020)
2017	The Place of Shining Light	2017 - Theatre503 (Part of the "Sahar Speaks: Voices of Women from Afghanistan" programme)	
2018	Sugar	2018 - Kiln Theatre	Part of Mapping Brent Festival
2019	J'ouvert	2019 - Theatre503; 2021 - Harold Pinter Theatre	Joseph's West End debut
2020	Inside this box	2020 - Arcola Theatre; Omnibus Theatre (Clapham); Online	Produced by Clean Break
2021	First Winter	2021 - Online reading performed by members of the Retired Caribbean Nurses’ Association, Bedford.	Produced in partnership with The Place Theatre Bedford, The Higgins Art Gallery & Museum, and University of Bedfordshire
2022	Of the Cut	2022 - Young Vic	
2025	Citizens of Umi	Unproduced	Shortlisted for George Devine Award

=== Television ===
Year	Title	Network / Production company	Notes
2025-2026	A Thousand Blows	Hulu, Disney +	Guest writer and story consultant
TBA	Major Players †	Channel 4, A24	Co-written with Molly Manning Walker

=== Audio ===
Year	Title	Station / Channel / Programme	Note
2023	The Wound	F**ked Up Bedtime Stories (for Adults) - podcast by English Touring Theatre	Read by Tamara Lawrance
2024-2025	A Proposal for Resisting Darkness	National Prison Radio	Audiodrama produced with Clean Break through workshops with inmates of HM Prison Downview; first performed inside the prison in 2022

== Recognition and awards ==
Year	Award	Category	Nominated work(s)	Result	Refs
2015	Alfred Fagon Award		Pinch	Longlisted	
2019	Evening Standard Theatre Awards	Most Promising Playwright	J'Ouvert	Nominated	
2020	James Tait Black Prize	Drama	J'Ouvert	Won	
2022	The Stage Debut Awards	Best Creative West End Debut	J'Ouvert	Nominated	
2025	George Devine Award		Citizens of Umi	Shortlisted	
