= Temi Wilkey =

British-Nigerian performer

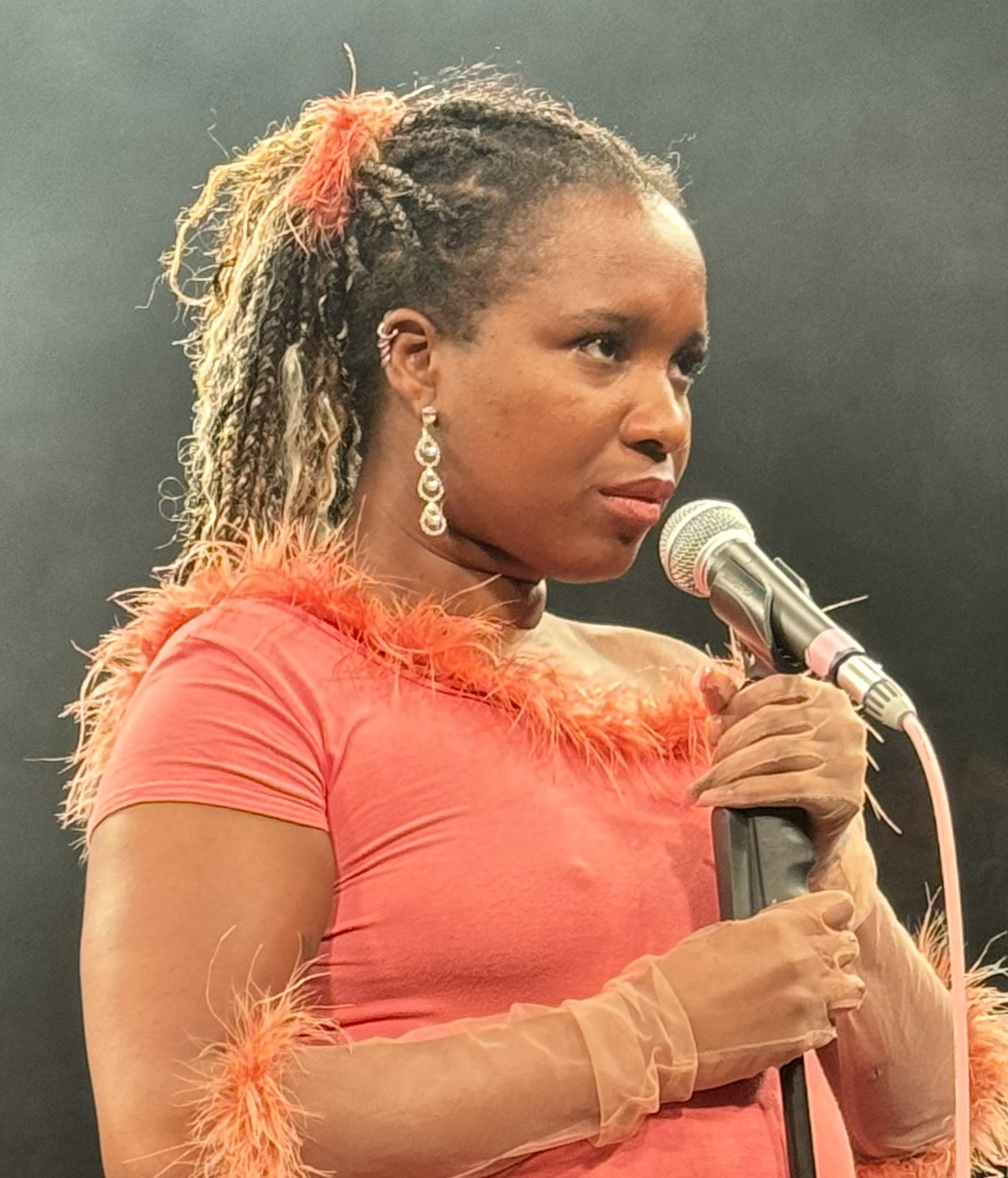
- Wilkey at the 2024 Edinburgh Festival Fringe
- Born: 1992 or 1993 (age 33–34)
- Occupation: Actor; playwright; screenwriter
- Education: University of Cambridge
- Notable works: The High Table (2020); Main Character Energy (2024)
- Notable awards: The Stage Debut Award for Best Writer (2020)

Temi Wilkey (born 1992 or 1993) is a British-Nigerian performer, playwright and television writer. She has written for the sitcom Sex Education, and her debut play, The High Table, premiered at the Bush Theatre in 2020, which went on to win a Stage Debut Award. In 2024, she performed a one-woman play, Main Character Energy, at Edinburgh Festival Fringe.

Wilkey is also the co-founder of a drag king group called Pecs, where she played a character named Drag King Cole, who is a singer, songwriter and producer from Chicago, Illinois.

Wilkey is an alumna of the University of Cambridge, where she studied English Literature.

== Awards and nominations ==
Year	Award	Category	Nominated work(s)	Result	Refs
2020	The Stage Debut Awards	Best Writer	The High Table	Won	
2020	George Devine Award		The High Table	Shortlisted	
