= Paula B. Stanic =

British playwright

- Occupation: Playwright
- Writing career
- Notable work: Monday
- Notable awards: Alfred Fagon Award, 2008

Paula B. Stanic (also known as Paula Bardowell Stanic) is a British playwright and the winner of the 2008 Alfred Fagon Award for the best new play by a Black playwright of African or Caribbean descent living in the United Kingdom. Her play Monday was short-listed for the 2009 John Whiting Award. She has been a writer-in-residence at the Royal Court Theatre and Soho Theatre (2012-13), and a writer on attachment at the National Theatre Studio.

She grew up in Manor Park, East London. Her parents are from Jamaica, and her husband is from Serbia.

== Plays ==
- Love & Marriage, [contributor] 2001
- What's Lost, 2008
- Late-night Shopping, [short] 2009
- 6 Minutes, [short] 2009
- Monday, 2009
- Pancras Boys Club, [co-written with Ben Musgrave and David Watson] 2012
- Under a Foreign Sky, 2011
- Blair's Children, [contributor] 2013
- Steering Through Stars, 2015
- Disconnect
- Icons, 2017
- Messiah, 2018
