= Soon Gone: A Windrush Chronicle =

- Promotional image of the series, featuring all characters
- Written by: Carmen Harris; Kwame Kwei-Armah; Clint Dyer; Juliet Gilkes Romero; Angie Le Mar; Nathaniel Martello-White; Roy Williams; Carol Russell
- Directed by: Destiny Ekaragha; Christiana Ebohon-Green; Dionne Edwards; Tinge Krishnan
- Country of origin: United Kingdom
- No. of series: 1
- No. of episodes: 8

Production
- Executive producers: Kwame Kwei-Armah; Lenny Henry; Angela Ferreira; Lamia Dabboussy
- Producer: Carol Harding
- Running time: 15 minutes
- Production companies: Young Vic Theatre; Douglas Road Productions; BBC Arts

Original release
- Network: BBC Four
- Release: 17 February – 20 February 2019

Soon Gone: A Windrush Chronicle is a television series broadcast on BBC Four in February 2019. The series consisted of eight fifteen-minute monologues and portrayed the stories of a British Afro-Caribbean family across four generations, from their arrival to the UK in the 1940s to the present day. It was jointly produced by BBC Arts, Young Vic Theatre, and Sir Lenny Henry's Douglas Road Productions. The series was curated by Young Vic's artistic director Kwame Kwei-Armah and featured writings from prominent playwrights of British Afro-Caribbean heritage.

The series was nominated for Best Short Form in the 2020 British Academy Television Awards and writer Roy Williams, who wrote episode 7, was nominated for Best Writer in the Drama category at the Royal Television Society Programme Awards in the same year.

== Background ==
Soon Gone: A Windrush Chronicle aired in 2019, a year after the 50th anniversary of the arrival of a major wave of Caribbean migrants in the United Kingdom, who would later be known as the Windrush generation. Several real life events are woven into the series' narratives, including the New Cross house fire in 1981, the murder of Stephen Lawrence in 1993, the 2011 Tottenham riot, as well as the Windrush scandal. For curator Kwame Kwei-Armah, the series was a personal tribute to his late parents, who had migrated to the UK from Grenada in the early 1960s.

Sir Lenny Henry, executive producer for the series spoke of the monologue format chosen for the programme:

"Little monologues are a great thing. It's somebody talking down the camera about specific issues and telling stories. Particularly in the developing world, we come from an oral tradition of people looking you in the eye and telling you a story. So I thought it was a perfect environment to tell the stories you may not have heard before about the black community."

The series was broadcast from 17 to 20 February 2019 on BBC Four and was part of its season of programming dedicated to the celebration of British diverse history. It is also included in Young Vic's festival on the theme of identity, YV:ID. A discussion panel about the show featuring Kwei-Armah and British author Afua Hirsch took place as part of the festival on 21 February 2019.

Some of the creatives who worked on the series

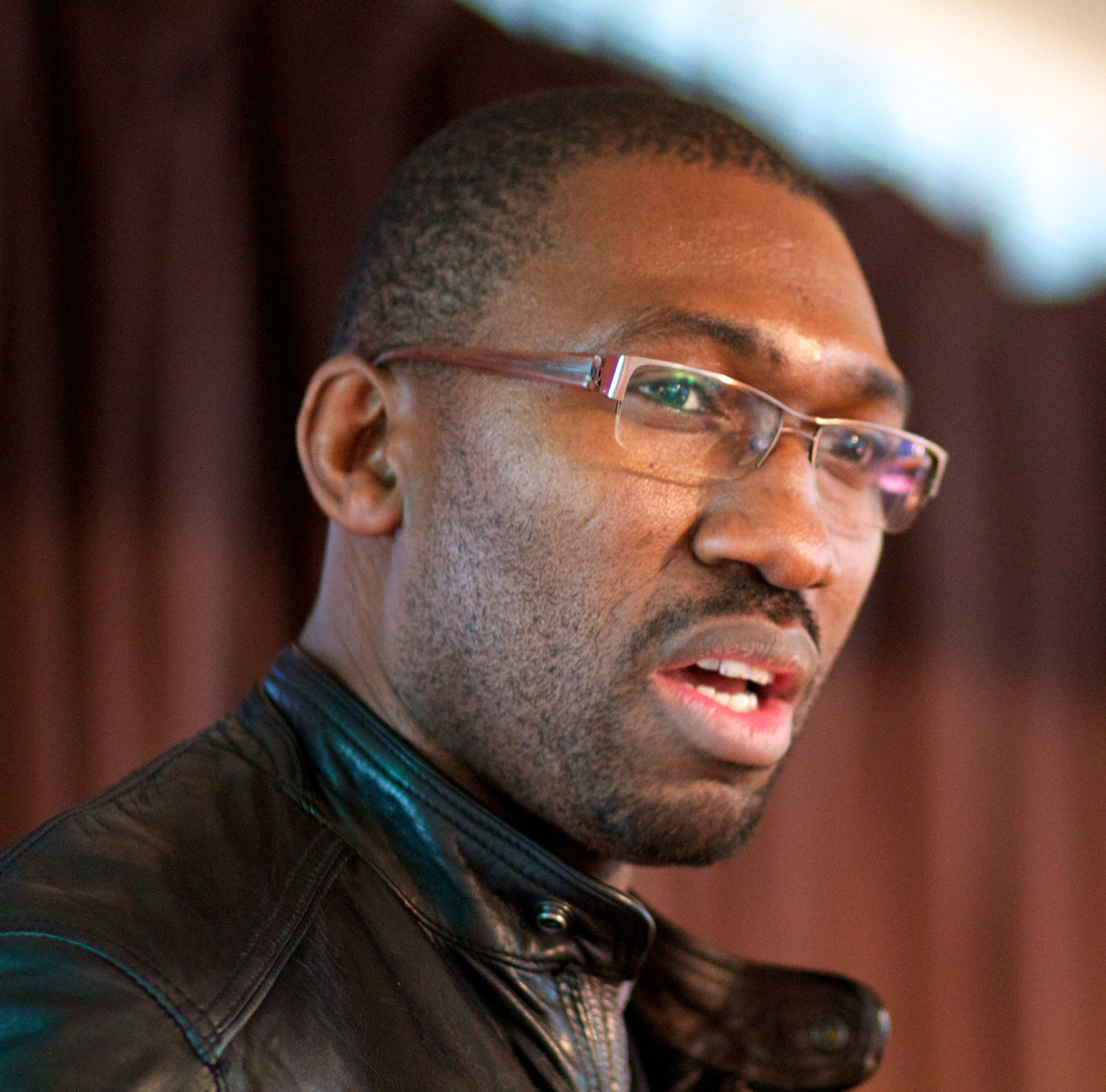
Kwame Kwei-Armah, artistic director of Young Vic theatre, curated the series and wrote its second episode, "Cyrus 1951".

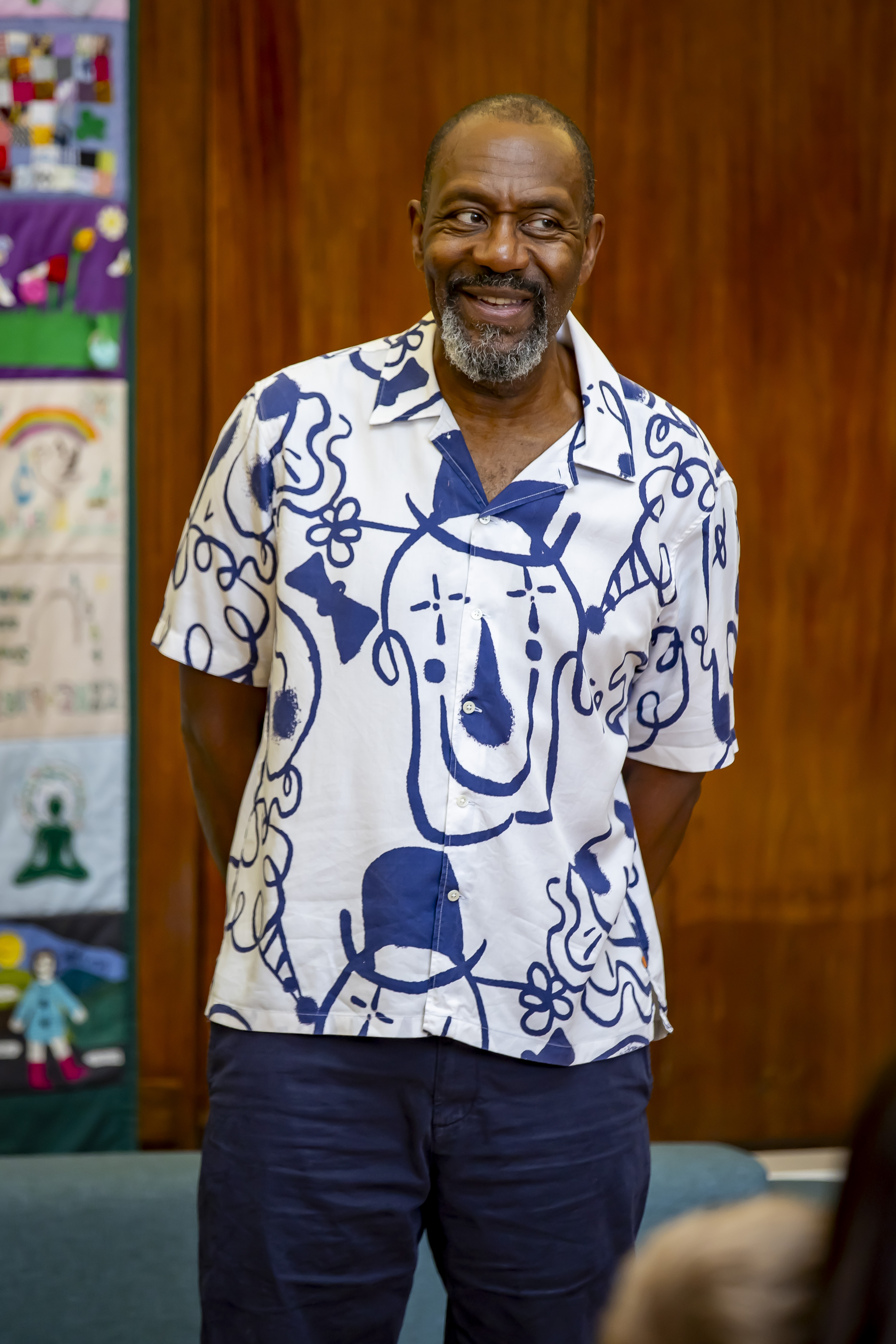
Sir Lenny Henry was one of the executive producers of the show in addition to starring in episode 7, "Cyrus 2011".

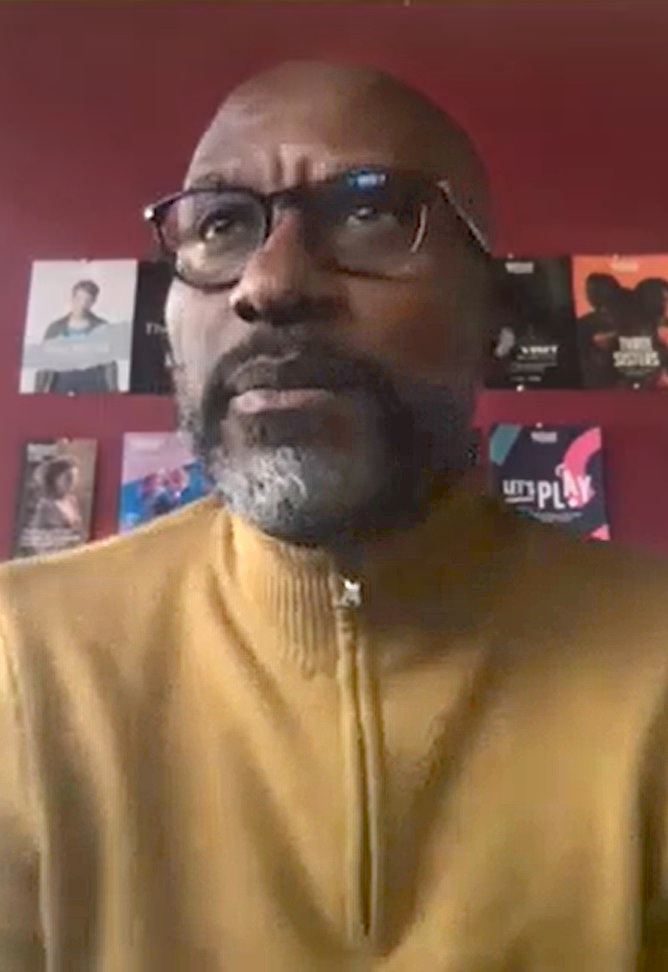
Clint Dyer, also known for his work as an actor and director, wrote episode 3, "Kev 1968".

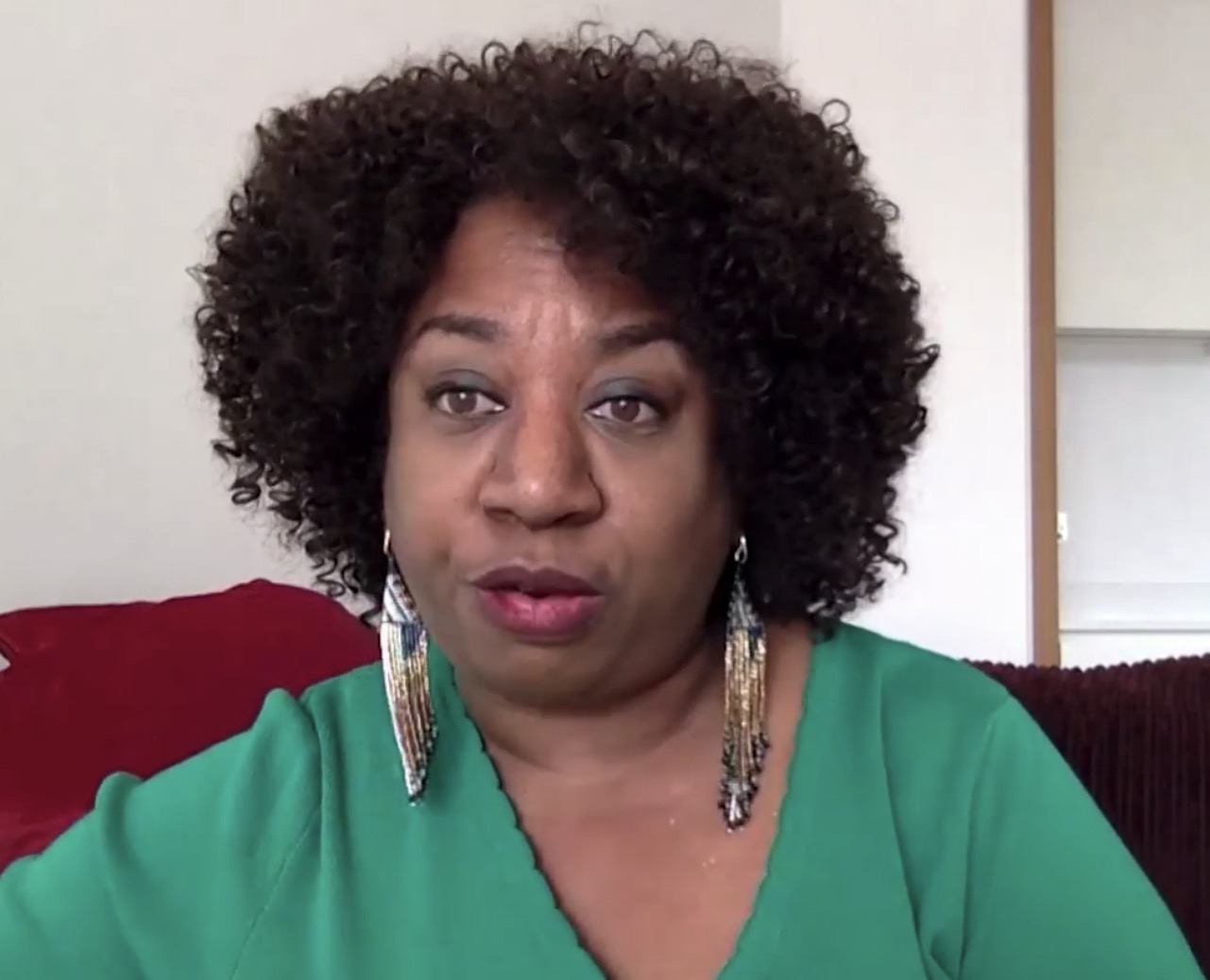
Playwright Juliet Gilkes Romero wrote episode 4, "Yvonne 1981".

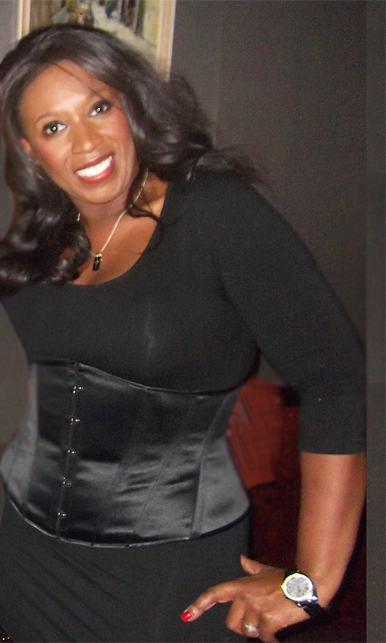
Actress and comedian Angie Le Mar wrote episode 7, "Samantha 1993".

== Episodes ==
No.	Title	Directed by	Written by	Original release date
1	"Eunice 1949"	Destiny Ekaragha	Carmen Harris	17 February 2019
It’s 1949 and a year after arriving on the Empire Windrush, Eunice Daley finds herself moving into a room in her uncle’s house, her belongings crammed into cardboard boxes. Cast: Danielle Vitalis as Eunice
2	"Cyrus 1951"	Christiana Ebohon-Green	Kwame Kwei-Armah	17 February 2019
Cyrus Williams believes he has found the love of his life in a young nurse, Eunice Daley. A chance meeting was all it took for him to want to spend the rest of his life with her. Cast: Clifford Samuel as Cyrus
3	"Kev 1968"	Dionne Edwards	Clint Dyer	18 February 2019
It’s 1968, and while the world is exploding around him, racially and politically, 17-year-old Kev keeps a low profile as a mechanic, the only black man in a white-owned garage. Cast: Jonathan Jules as Kev
4	"Yvonne 1981"	Christiana Ebohon-Green	Juliet Gilkes Romero	18 February 2019
In 1981, as Yvonne prepares to demonstrate for the young black victims of the New Cross fire, she finds herself giving expression to a deeper, personal loss for the first time. Cast: Vinette Robinson as Yvonne
5	"Samantha 1993"	Destiny Ekaragha	Angie Le Mar	19 February 2019
As the only white person in her husband’s large family, Samantha Williams has had to counter racial assumptions from both his family and her own. Cast: Montserrat Lombard as Samantha
6	"Malcolm and David 2000"	Tinge Krishnan	Nathaniel Martello-White	19 February 2019
At the start of a new century, 21-year-old cousins Malcolm and David reflect on their radically different upbringings and consider their current situations. Cast: Gamba Cole as Malcolm; Elliot Barnes-Worrell as David
7	"Cyrus 2011"	Tinge Krishnan	Roy Williams	20 February 2019
It is 2019, but in Cyrus’s confused mind it could be London 2011, and there are riots outside the house. Dementia forces his memories to fragment. Cast: Lenny Henry as Cyrus
8	"Michaela 2019"	Dionne Edwards	Carol Russell	20 February 2019
Teenager Michaela Williams has always considered herself black but looks white. Now, the Windrush scandal has brought the question of her heritage and belonging into sharp relief. Cast: Olivia-Mai Barrett as Michaela

== Reception ==
The series received overall positive reviews across major British newspapers, receiving 4 out of 5 stars from both The Guardian and The Telegraph. The Evening Standard praised the show for its ability to pack in profound messages, such as those concerning identity and belonging, without feeling like a lecture. Lenny Henry's performance as Cyrus in episode 7 was universally praised. As noted by the Evening Standard: "Henry gives a moving performance: funny, likeable and asking broad philosophical questions about the toll that immigration takes on a family".

The series won the Diversity in Drama Production category at the 2019 Screen Nation Film and Television Awards. It also received a nomination at the 2020 British Academy Television Awards for Best Short Form, in addition to Roy Williams's nomination for Best Drama Writer at the Royal Television Society Programme Awards in the same year.

Awards and nominations received by Soon Gone: A Windrush Chronicle
Year	Awards ceremony	Category	Nominee(s)	Result	Note/Refs
2019	Screen Nation Film and Television Awards	Diversity in Drama Production	—N/a	Won	
2020	Royal Television Society Programme Awards	Writer (Drama)	Roy Williams	Nominated	
2020	BAFTA Television Awards	Best Short Form	—N/a	Nominated	
