= Alfred Fagon =

British playwright and actor (1937–1986)

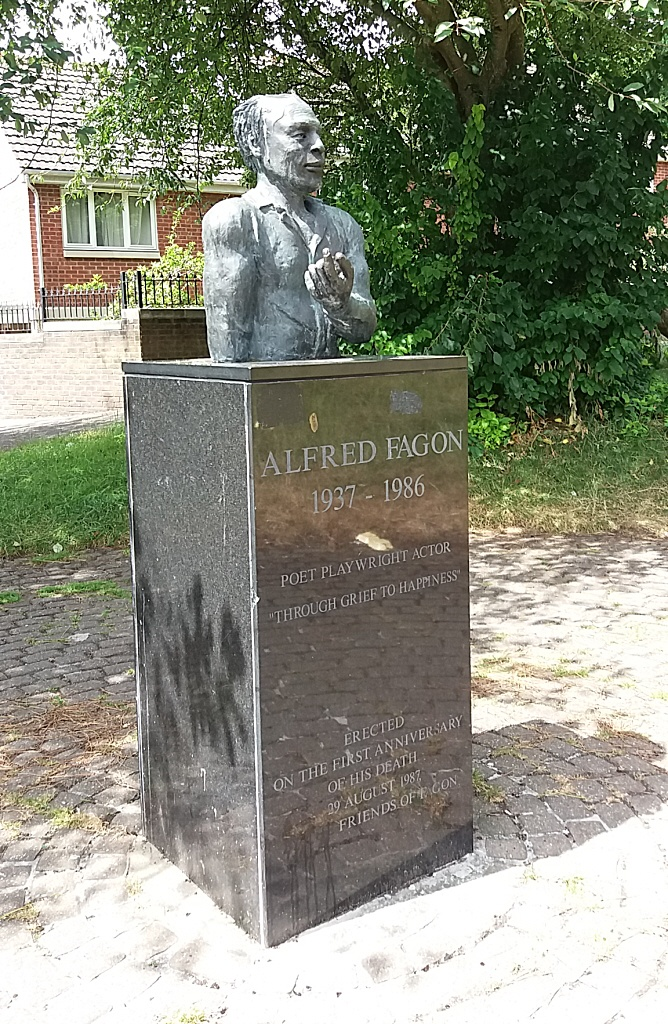
- Bronze bust of Alfred Fagon in St Paul's, Bristol
- Born: 25 June 1937; Clarendon Parish, Jamaica
- Died: 29 August 1986 (aged 49); Camberwell, England
- Writing career
- Language: English
- Genres: Poetry, theatre

Alfred Fagon (25 June 1937 – 29 August 1986) was a British playwright, poet and actor. He was one of the most notable Black British playwrights of the 1970s and 1980s. Fagon worked for British Rail and served in the British Army before he wrote and produced plays at theatres across the UK, including Royal Court Theatre and Hampstead Theatre.

== Biography ==
Alfred Fagon was born in Clarendon Parish, Jamaica, into a family of nine brothers and two sisters. In 1955 he migrated to England, and worked for British Rail in Nottingham, before in 1958 joining the Royal Corps of Signals, where he became Middleweight Boxing Champion in 1962, leaving the army the following year. He subsequently lived in Bristol, where he began working as an actor, his first stage appearance being at the Bristol Arts Centre, in the Henry Livings play The Little Mrs Foster Show, and in 1970 he starred in Mustapha Matura's play Black Pieces at the ICA in London. Fagon went on to write and produce plays, including 11 Josephine House, Death of a Blackman and Four Hundred Pounds, and took on many more acting roles, in television, film and radio, as well as in theatre.

Fagon died of a heart attack outside his flat in Camberwell on 29 August 1986, aged 49. Police claimed they were unable to identify him and he was given a pauper's funeral.

== Legacy ==
There is a statue of Fagon in St Paul's, Bristol, where he lived, on the corner of Ashley Road and Grosvenor Road. The bronze bust was sculpted by David G Mutasa and commissioned by the Friends of Fagon committee, chaired by Paul Stephenson, on the first anniversary of his death in 1987. The location was chosen because Fagon would often say "the heart of St. Paul’s is at the corner of Ashley Road and Grosvenor Road". On 11 June 2020, during a period of protests by the Black Lives Matter movement, people reported to the local police that the bust was apparently coated with an unknown substance. This followed the removal of the statue of Edward Colston during a protest in Bristol on 7 June 2020. The statue was awarded Grade II listed status by Historic England in September 2022.

In 1996 the Alfred Fagon Award, an annual award for the best new play by a Black British playwright of Caribbean or African descent, resident in the United Kingdom, was founded to commemorate his life and work.

Fagon's archives are part of the Theatre and Performance Collections of the V&A.

== Plays ==
- 11 Josephine House (1972)
- The Death of a Black Man (1975)
- Four Hundred Pounds (1982)
- Lonely Cowboy (1985)
