= Charlene James =

British playwright

- Born: 1982 or 1983 (age 43–44)
- Education: Birmingham School of Acting
- Occupations: Playwright, screenwriter
- Writing career
- Notable works: Cuttin' It; Doctor Who
- Notable awards: Alfred Fagon Award; George Devine Award

Charlene James is a British playwright and screenwriter. She won substantial acclaim for her play Cuttin' It, which addresses the issue of female genital mutilation in Britain, for which she won numerous awards.

== Early life ==
James grew up in Birmingham, England, raised by parents who are Jamaican immigrants. She became interested in acting as a child, and took acting classes at Stage2 in Birmingham. She is a graduate of Birmingham School of Acting (now part of the Royal Birmingham Conservatoire). She had further training in acting at the Steppenwolf Theatre Company in Chicago before becoming interested in playwriting, and earned a place in the young writers' program at the Royal Court Theatre in London.

== Career ==
=== Playwriting ===
Her first play, Maybe Father, was short-listed for the Alfred Fagon Award in 2009, and received a reading at the Young Vic theatre in London. She took a post as writer-in-residence at the Birmingham Repertory Theatre in 2013, where she focused on writing about teen mental health. She wrote Tweet Tweet for on a commission the Birmingham Youth Rep in 2014. The one-act play addresses issues of teen suicide and the pressures of social media.

James came to greater public awareness with her 2014 play Cuttin' It. The play focuses on two teenage girls, both Somalis living in England, who have different perspectives on the practice of female genital mutilation (FGM). James was inspired to write the play after watching the documentary The Cruel Cut by filmmaker Leyla Hussein, and after learning that FGM is practiced in Britain. Cuttin' It earned James the George Devine Award, the Alfred Fagon Award, the Critics' Circle Theatre Award, the UK Theatre Award for Best New Play, and the Evening Standard Theatre Award for Most Promising Playwright . She was a finalist for the 2016-17 Susan Smith Blackburn Prize, also honoring Cuttin' It.

James' play Bricks and Pieces was commissioned and performed in 2016 by Tiata Fahodzi in collaboration with the Royal Academy of Dramatic Art. The play examines themes of family, loss, masculinity, as well as communication and its lack, and addresses the challenges of being a gay man from an African family in Britain.

=== Screenwriting ===
She has written for the BBC's The Break and Sky's fantasy drama series A Discovery of Witches. In November 2019, James was announced as one of the writers for the twelfth series of Doctor Who, making her the second black writer on the television series in its entire history following Malorie Blackman the previous series. She co-wrote the seventh episode, Can You Hear Me?, with showrunner Chris Chibnall. The episode dealt with mental health issues, including examining past trauma for companion Yasmin Khan (Mandip Gill). She would later collaborate with Doctor Who alum Pete McTighe on his supernatural thriller series The Rising for Sky Max.

== Plays ==
- Maybe Father, 2009
- Do You Wish to Continue?, [short play] 2012
- Lundun
- Dad(die), 2012
- Jump! We'll Catch You, 2013
- Bacon
- Tweet Tweet, 2014
- Cuttin' It, 2014
- Bricks and Pieces, 2016
- Go Home, [short play, published in The Guardian] 2017
- "Reclaim the Night", [monologue] in Snatches: Moments from 100 Years of Women's Lives: Eight Monologues, 2019

== Awards and nominations ==
Year	Award	Category	Work	Result
2009	Alfred Fagon Award		Maybe Father	Shortlisted
2014	Alfred Fagon Award		Cuttin' It	Won
2015	George Devine Award		Cuttin' It	Won
2016	UK Theatre Awards	Best New Play	Cuttin' It	Won
2016	Evening Standard Theatre Awards	Most Promising Playwright	Cuttin' It	Won
2016	Critics’ Circle Theatre Award	Most Promising Playwright	Cuttin' It	Won
2017	Susan Smith Blackburn Prize		Cuttin' It	Shortlisted
