= Faith Omole =

British actress and playwright

- Born: 1992 (age 33–34)
- Other name: Faith Syrstad (married name)
- Education: Royal Central School of Speech and Drama
- Occupations: Actress; singer; playwright; screenwriter
- Spouse: Paul Syrstad
- Writing career
- Genre: Drama
- Notable works: My Father's Fable (2024)
- Notable awards: 2024 - Alfred Fagon Award

Faith Omole (born 1992) is a British actress and writer. Having appeared in several West End productions, Omole is the recipient of a Laurence Olivier Award nomination for her role in Standing at the Sky's Edge. On television, she is known for her role in the Channel 4 sitcom We Are Lady Parts (2021–2024). Omole is also a playwright, having won the Alfred Fagon Award for her (unproduced) play, Kaleidoscope (2023). Her debut play, My Father's Fable, was staged at Bush Theatre in 2024.

== Early life ==
Omole was born and raised in London to parents who were born in Nigeria. She spoke of her upbringing in an immigrant household: "You'd go to school and felt like you were someone else, then when you got home and were in a Nigerian home." Omole's brothers, Kenneth and John, are also actors.

Omole was introduced to the theatre world at school, where she enjoyed drama lessons. She later trained as an actor at the Royal Central School of Speech and Drama.

== Career ==
=== As actress ===
Before debuting in the West End, Omole performed in a number of touring productions across various theatres in the UK. Notably, she was in the original cast of Chris Urch's The Rolling Stone, which premiered at the Royal Exchange, Manchester in 2015, followed by performances in Leeds and London. The play's run at Orange Tree Theatre was nominated for Best Production at The Offies in 2017.

Omole's first West End role was as Mabel Chiltern in the 2018 production of An Ideal Husband at Vaudeville Theatre. She has also appeared in a number of Shakespeare productions, namely Twelfth Night (Manchester, 2017), A Midsummer Night's Dream (The Globe, 2019), and King Lear (Almeida, 2024).

Omole originated the role of Joy in the musical Standing at the Sky's Edge, premiered at the Crucible Theatre in Sheffield in 2019. She reprised the role when the musical was revived in Sheffield in 2022 and for its transfer to the National Theatre in 2023. For her performance, Omole was nominated for a Laurence Olivier Award for Best Actress in a Musical in 2023.

Omole is also best known for her TV role on both seasons of Channel 4 musical-comedy series We Are Lady Parts (2021-2024), created by Nida Manzoor. In the show, she co-stars as Bisma, the bassist and backing vocalist of Lady Parts, a punk band made up of all Muslim women. She learned to play the bass via online lessons in preparation for the role.

=== As writer ===
Omole wrote her first play in between rehearsals and shows. For her work Kaleidoscope (2023), yet to be produced, she won the Alfred Fagon Award, awarded to a new play by a Black British author. Her first play to be staged was My Father's Fable, which ran at the Bush Theatre in 2024, with BAFTA-winning actress Rakie Ayola in the cast. The production was positively received, with 4-star reviews from The Guardian, WhatsOnStage, and BroadwayWorld. Before being staged, My Father's Fable had previously been longlisted for the Alfred Fagon Award in 2021.

Omole co-wrote and co-produced Angel Studios series Testament (2025) with her husband Paul Syrstad and her brother Kenneth.

Omole has said to feel excited about creating opportunities for other Black actresses as she herself has noticed, herself as an actor, the lack of roles written for Black women.

=== Music ===
Omole's singing was featured in the Original Live Cast Recording album of Standing at the Sky's Edge released in 2023. She was also featured in the Original Soundtrack album for Seasons 1 and 2 of We Are Lady Parts (released in 2024) as a member of the titular band as well as the solo vocalist of the track "Don't let me be misunderstood".

== Personal life ==
Omole met her husband Paul Syrstad when they both studied acting at university. She is sometimes credited as Faith Syrstad, her married name.

== Acting credits ==
=== TV ===
Year	Title	Role	Network / Production company	Notes
2019	Endeavour	Olive Reynolds	ITV	Guest role in Series 6 - Episode 4
2021-2024	We Are Lady Parts	Bisma	Channel 4 / Working Title Television	Main role
2026	Grace	Amara Obasi	ITV	Guest role in Series 6, episode 4

=== Audio drama ===
Year	Title	Role	Network / Production company	Notes
2022	One Five Seven Years	Uche	BBC Radio 4	Episode 2: Uche
2023–2026	Gallifrey	Cresta	Big Finish Productions	Doctor Who spinoff audio play; Series 14 (War Room 2: Manoeuvres) and Series 15 (War Room 3: Loyalties)

=== Stage ===
Year	Title	Role	Venue(s)/Production	Notes
2013	Roadkill	Mary	Carnegie Hall, Dunfermline; Dundee Repertory Theatre; The Lemon Tree, Aberdeen	
2015-2016	The Rolling Stone	Wummie	Orange Tree Theatre; Royal Exchange, Manchester; Leeds Playhouse	
2017	Twelfth Night	Viola	Royal Exchange, Manchester	
2018	An Ideal Husband	Mabel Chiltern	Vaudeville Theatre	
2019	Standing at the Sky's Edge	Joy	Crucible Theatre	
2019	A Midsummer Night's Dream	Hermia	Shakespeare's Globe	
2021	White Noise	Misha	Bridge Theatre	
2022-2023	Standing at the Sky's Edge	Joy	Crucible Theatre	
2023	Standing at the Sky's Edge	Joy	Olivier Theatre	
2024	King Lear	Regan	Almeida Theatre	
2025	Intimate Apparel	Mayme	Donmar Warehouse	

=== Writing credits ===
Year	Title	Notable productions	Notes
2023	Kaleidoscope	Unproduced	Winner of the Alfred Fagon Award (2024)
2024	My Father's Fable	2024 - Bush Theatre	

== Awards and nominations ==
Year	Award	Category	Work	Result	Ref.
2021	Alfred Fagon Award		My Father's Fable	Longlisted	
2023	Laurence Olivier Awards	Best Actress in a Musical	Standing at the Sky's Edge	Nominated	
2023	Alfred Fagon Award		Kaleidoscope	Won	
