= Inua Ellams =

Nigerian-born British playwright and poet

Inua Ellams MBE FRSL
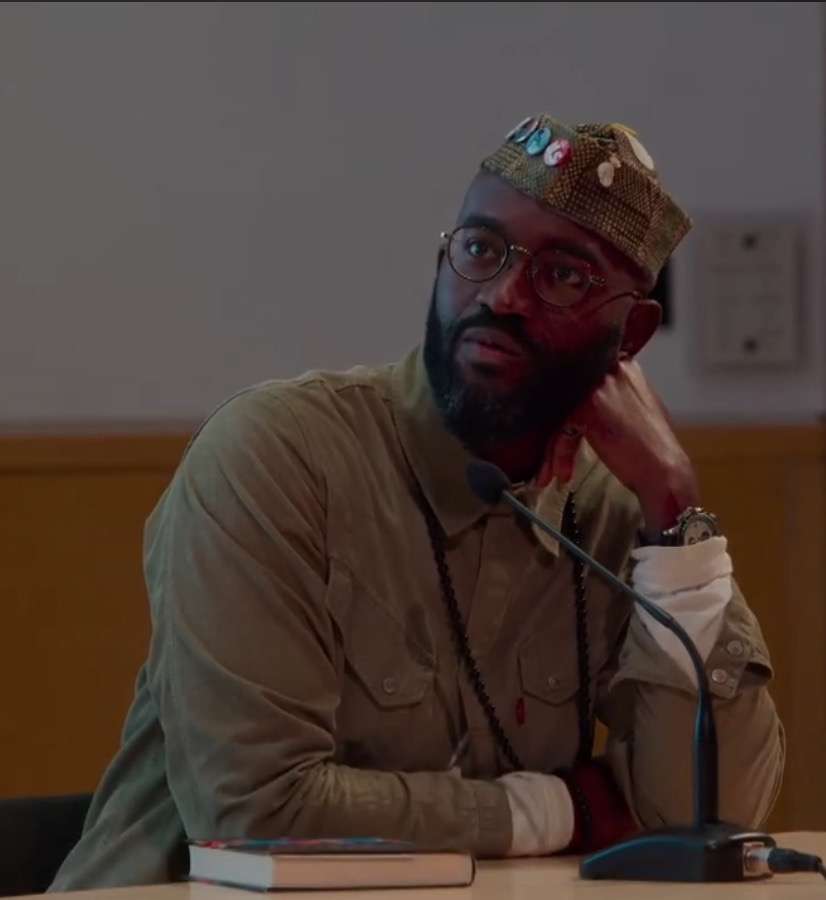
- Ellams at Africa Writes Festival 2021
- Born: Inua Marc Mohammed Onore de Ellams II; 23 October 1984 (age 41); Jos, Plateau State, Nigeria
- Citizenship: Nigeria
- Education: Firhouse Community College, Dublin, Ireland
- Occupations: Poet, playwright
- Known for: Barber Shop Chronicles
- Awards: Edinburgh Fringe First Award (2008)
- Website: www.inuaellams.com

Inua Marc Mohammed Onore de Ellams II MBE FRSL (born 23 October 1984) is a Nigerian-born British poet, playwright and performer. He was appointed Member of the Order of the British Empire (MBE) in the 2023 Birthday Honours for services to the arts.

== Early years and education ==
Inua Ellams was born in 1984 in Jos, Plateau State, Nigeria, to a Muslim father and a Christian mother. When he was 12 years old, he moved with his family to England, and three years later to Ireland, where he attended Firhouse Community College.

== Work ==
Ellams has written for the Royal Shakespeare Company, Royal National Theatre and the BBC.

In June 2018, Ellams was elected as a Fellow of the Royal Society of Literature as part of its 40 Under 40 initiative. He took part in The Complete Works mentoring programme for poets of colour.

=== Poetry ===
- Thirteen Fairy Negro Tales (flipped eye publishing, 2004)
- Candy Coated Unicorns and Converse All Stars (flipped eye publishing, 2010)
- The Wire-Headed Heathen (Akashic Books, 2015)
- The Half-God of Rainfall (Fourth Estate, 2019)
- The Actual (Penned In The Margins, 2020)

==== Featured in anthologies ====
- The Salt Book of Younger Poets (Salt, 2010)
- The Valley Press Anthology of Prose Poetry (Valley Press, 2018)
- Ten: The New Wave (Bloodaxe, 2013)

=== Performances and plays ===
==== The 14th Tale ====
Ellams's one-man show The 14th Tale was awarded an Edinburgh Fringe First at the Edinburgh International Festival in 2009, and later transferred to the Royal National Theatre, London.

==== Untitled ====
A one-man show staged at the Soho Theatre in 2010, telling the story of twins born on Nigeria's independence day.

==== Barber Shop Chronicles ====
Barber Shop Chronicles is a play set in black barber shops in six cities on one day, against the backdrop of a football match between Chelsea and Barcelona. The play explores the African diaspora in the UK, masculinity, homosexuality and religion. The play was produced by the National Theatre, Fuel Theatre and Leeds Playhouse and was shortlisted for the Alfred Fagon Award in 2017. Following a period of touring, the play was also performed at the Roundhouse in 2019, and a recording of the National Theatre production was streamed in May 2020 as part of the National Theatre at Home season. For the production, Ellams recorded 60 hours of "male banter" in barbershops all over Africa and in London at his barber Peter's shop Emmanuel's in Clapham Junction. This project originally did not secure funding.

==== An Evening with an Immigrant ====
At the Traverse Theatre, Edinburgh, in 2017, Ellams performed a live stage programme titled An Evening with an Immigrant, with anecdotes of his childhood and his experiences as a refugee. An excerpt was shown at the Hay Festival on 24 May 2020.

==== The Half God of Rainfall ====
In April 2019, his new play, The Half God of Rainfall, was presented at the Birmingham Repertory Theatre, in advance of its run at London's Kiln Theatre, as well as its publication as a book.

==== Three Sisters ====
In December 2019–February 2020, a reworking by Ellams of Anton Chekhov's play Three Sisters was performed at the Royal National Theatre, London. The play restaged the story in the 1960s in the midst of the Biafran war in Nigeria.

=== Television ===
==== Doctor Who ====
In January 2025, it was announced that Ellams had joined the writing team of the fifteenth series of Doctor Who. Ellams is the first black man to have written for the BBC's science-fiction television series, and the fourth black writer overall (after Malorie Blackman, Charlene James and Sharma Angel Walfall).

Ellams wrote the episode The Story & the Engine, set in contemporary Lagos, Nigeria, which was broadcast on 10 May 2025.

== Awards ==
- 2008: winner of an Edinburgh Fringe First Award for The 14th Tale.
- 2014: Live Canon International Poetry Prize.
- 2017: shortlisted for the Alfred Fagon Award, for The Barber Shop Chronicles.
- 2018: elected a Fellow of the Royal Society of Literature.
- 2020: winner of the medal for Poetry at the Hay Festival for The Half God of Rainfall and for The Barber Shop Chronicles
- 2024: Alfred Fagon Award for Once Upon A Time In Sokoto
