= Theresa Ikoko =

British playwright

- Education: Royal Holloway, University of London; University of Oxford
- Occupations: Playwright, screenwriter
- Writing career
- Notable work: Girls (play)
- Notable awards: Alfred Fagon Award

Theresa Ikoko is a British playwright and screenwriter of Nigerian descent. Her play Girls, about three girls abducted by terrorists in northern Nigeria, won the Alfred Fagon Award and other awards.

Ikoko later gained greater nationwide recognition, in 2019, for co-writing the feature-length coming-of-age drama Rocks with Clarie Wilson, which earned Ikoko a BAFTA Award nomination for Best Original Screenplay at the 74th British Academy Film Awards in 2021.

== Early life and education ==
Ikoko grew up with her mother and eight siblings in the Hackney neighbourhood of London. Ikoko has said that the label "poor" was put upon her and that communities that are poorer are misrepresented by the media as "problem areas" which ignores the potential of these areas and the fact that the negativity coming from these communities is a societal issue. She says that "poverty isn't all about suffering and darkness", and describes her upbringing as "rich in joy".

Growing up, Ikoko was inspired by authors Malorie Blackman, Sister Souljah, and Eric Jerome Dickey.

Ikoko earned an undergraduate degree in psychology from Royal Holloway, University of London, and a master's degree in Criminology and Criminal Psychology from the University of Oxford. While at Royal Holloway she contributed to a journal article on "how the conversation dynamics of women from ethnic majority and minority groups varied in different conversational contexts".

Ikoko has worked on social inclusion and community engagement projects within prisons, including facilitating creative and performing arts workshops with incarcerated persons. She worked with Islington Integrated Gangs, a London organization that focuses on gang violence in youth communities, from 2014 until 2019, when she began writing full-time.

== Career ==
=== 2015: Playwrighting career ===
Ikoko began her career as a playwright. Her first full-length play was Normal, which was produced as a staged reading as part of the Talawa Firsts' series in 2014. She came to greater attention and acclaim for her second full-length play, Girls, which won the Alfred Fagon Award for best new play in 2015; the award honors excellence in playwrights by authors of African or Caribbean ancestry living in the United Kingdom. Girls went on to be produced by Talawa Theatre Company, HighTide Theatre and Soho Theatre in 2016, before being revived for a tour in 2017 which also took in shows at the 2017 Edinburgh Fringe. At the time, Ikoko said:

"This isn’t the first play I've written, but it's my first produced play. The first play I wrote, I didn't really know it was a play, it was just for me. I would read it over the phone to my friend and when I'd finished he said I had to show it to someone. Talawa Theatre Company found me and [artistic director] Michael Buffong put that play in a Talawa Firsts show, and I got signed by my agent there. A few months later, I was commissioned to work with Clean Break and Talawa. I make no exaggerations when I say Talawa completely took a chance on me. I had no training or experience or credentials, and there was no one to offer a reference. But Michael believed in me. It took me forever though, probably until the opening night of Girls at HighTide, for me to believe him."

Ikoko was one of five winners of the Channel 4 Playwrights Scheme for her play Girls, which earned Ikoko a year-long playwriting fellowship the HighTide Theatre. Ikoko also received the George Devine Award for most promising playwright in 2016. Girls was produced at the Birmingham Repertory Theatre, the HighTide Festival, and at the Soho Theatre in 2016. It was Ikoko's first professionally produced play. The play addresses issues of kidnapping, forced religion, sexism, and arranged marriage as well as themes of friendship and resilience. A review in The Times called the play "pungent", "provocative", "scorchingly intelligent and as powerful as a gut punch".

Ikoko cites as inspirations playwrights debbie tucker green and Dennis Kelly, author Chinua Achebe, and recording artist and activist Sister Souljah. Speaking about her motivation for writing, Ikoko has said:

"As a writer, I want to write things that change the lives of 14 year old girls in school, of university students and of grown men behind prison doors."

=== Plays ===
- The Race Card, 2013
- Normal, 2014
- Visiting Hours, 2014
- Girls, 2015

=== 2019-present: Rocks, Expansion into screenwriting ===
With Claire Wilson, Ikoko co-wrote the screenplay for Sarah Gavron's 2019 film Rocks, a coming-of-age drama film starring Bukky Bakray as a Black British teenage girl living in Hackney, London, whose single mother abandons her and her younger brother Emmanuel, forcing them to try to avoid being taken into social services. The film premiered at the Toronto International Film Festival in 2019 and opened in Britain on 18 September 2020, where it received critical acclaim from critics and earned Ikoko a BAFTA Award nomination for Best Original Screenplay at the 74th British Academy Film Awards in 2021, where the film was nominated for seven awards including Outstanding British Film and Best Actress in a Leading Role for Bakray, making her one of the youngest nominees for the award. Nineteen-year-old Bukky Bakray also received BAFTA Rising Star Award, becoming the youngest winner in the category.

In 2021, it was announced that Ikoko would scripting a six-part television adaptation of DJ Target's 2018 book Grime Kids, which focused on the rise of a fictional group of young teenagers growing up in the early 2000s, dreaming of being able to make their voice heard through music. Filming took place in East London and the series is due to broadcast on BBC Three and BBC iPlayer later in 2023.

== Awards ==
Year	Award	Category	Work	Result	Ref.
2015	Alfred Fagon Award	Best New Play	Girls	Won	
2016	George Devine Award	Most Promising Playwright	Girls	Won	
2016	Channel 4 Playwrights Scheme		Girls	Recipient	
2020	British Independent Film Awards	Best British Independent Film	Rocks	Won	
2020	British Independent Film Awards	Best Screenplay	Rocks	Nominated	
2020	British Independent Film Awards	Best Debut Screenwriter	Rocks	Nominated	
2021	British Academy Film Awards	Best Original Screenplay	Rocks	Nominated	
2021	British Academy Film Awards	Outstanding Debut by a British Writer, Director or Producer	Rocks	Nominated	
2021	British Academy Film Awards	Outstanding British Film	Rocks	Nominated	
