= Oladipo Agboluaje =

British-Nigerian playwright (born 1968)

- Born: 1968 (age 57–58); Hackney, England
- Other name: Dipo Agboluaje
- Education: University of Benin; Open University
- Occupation: Playwright

Oladipo Agboluaje (born 1968) is a British-Nigerian playwright. He was born in Hackney and educated in Britain and Nigeria, studying theatre arts at the University of Benin. He later wrote a doctoral thesis at the Open University on West and South African drama. Agboluaje has taught at several universities including Goldsmiths, University of London, City University, London, London Metropolitan University, and the University of Greenwich. He is the course director of the Black British Theatre and Performance programme at the British American Drama Academy (BADA) in London.

Agboluaje has served on the boards of Ovalhouse (formerly Oval House Theatre, now Brixton House) and Soho Theatre. He was the 2019 writer-in-residence of the National Theatre, London. He is also the treasurer of the African Theatre Association and a member of the editorial board of their journal, African Performance Review.

== Works ==
- Early Morning, at Ovalhouse, produced by Futuretense in 2003.
- God is a DJ, produced by Theatre Centre and presented in 2006 at Redbridge Drama Centre and elsewhere.
- The Estate, presented in 2006 as a co-production of Tiata Fahodzi company and Soho Theatre.
- The Christ of Coldharbour Lane, presented in 2007 at Soho Theatre, where Agboluaje was writer-in-residence.
- For One Night Only, presented on tour and at Ovalhouse in 2008.
- The Hounding of David Oluwale, an adaptation of Kester Aspden's book of the same name (which had originally been issued with the title Nationality: Wog), about the life and death of David Oluwale, presented at the West Yorkshire Playhouse and elsewhere in 2009.
- Iya Ile (The First Wife), at Soho Theatre, as a co-production of Tiata Fahodzi and Soho Theatre, 2009.
- The Garbage King, adaptation of Elizabeth Laird's novel, Unicorn Theatre, 2010.
- Say Goodbye Twice, BBC Radio 3, first aired in 2010.
- Giant Killers, Theatre Royal, Plymouth/Polka Theatre, 2013.
- Threshold, Collective Artistes/University of Richmond, Virginia, April 2014.
- Obele and the Storyteller, World Book Capital, Port Harcourt, Nigeria, April 2014.
- Immune, Royal & Derngate, Northampton, West Yorkshire Playhouse, Theatre Royal, Plymouth, 2015.
- New Nigerians, Arcola Theatre, London, 2017
- Here's What She Said To Me, The Crucible, Sheffield, 2022, bational tour
- The Famished Road, Dramaten, Stockholm, 2022, adaptation of Ben Okri's novel of the same name
