= Chinonyerem Odimba =

British playwright and artistic director

Chinonyerem Odimba is a British playwright, director and Artistic Director. She was born in Umuahia, Nigeria in 1974, and moved to London aged seven.

Odimba is best known for her play Wild is De Wind (long-listed for the Bruntwood Award in 2015) and musical Black Love which toured the UK in 2021 and transferred to Kiln Theatre in 2022. She is artistic director of the theatre company tiata fahodzi. For International Women's Day 2022, she featured on the Evening Standard list of "London women changing the world". In 2026, she appeared on The Stage 100 list.
