= Karoo Moose =

Play by Lara Foot Newton

Karoo Moose is a play by the South African playwright Lara Foot Newton. Set in a remote village in the Karoo, the play depicts the trials and tribulations of a young girl called Thozama. In the play, the main character Thozama ends up killing a moose that is inexplicably in the middle of the Karoo, and it shows all the events that follow. This play combines elements of magical realism and African story telling to tell the story of the inevitable breach of innocence that so many children in South Africa suffer. The themes of the play are present to show that in order for such a pattern of violence and the breach of innocence to end, something completely out of the ordinary/external must take place.

The play won multiple awards in its native South Africa. In 2009, the play transferred to the Tricycle Theatre in London, where it formed the first half of a mini South African season. The play received positive reviews from the London theatre critics.
