= Richard Norton-Taylor =

British editor, journalist and playwright

- Born: Richard Seymour Norton-Taylor; 4 June 1944 (age 82)
- Education: Hertford College, Oxford
- Occupations: Editor, journalist and playwright
- Spouse: Anna C. Rendle (m. 1967)
- Children: Hugo Norton-Taylor, Sam Norton-Taylor
- Relatives: 5 grandchildren

Richard Seymour Norton-Taylor (born 6 June 1944) is a British editor, journalist, and playwright. He wrote for The Guardian on defence and security matters from 1975 to 2016, and was the newspaper's security editor. He now works for the investigative journalism site Declassified UK.

== Early life and education ==
He was born to Lt. Seymour Norton-Taylor, R.A., and Gweneth Joan Powell (died 9 January 1978).

Norton-Taylor was educated at The King's School in Canterbury, Kent, going on to study at Hertford College, a constituent college of the University of Oxford, and the College of Europe in Bruges.

== Career ==
He was the European Community and Brussels correspondent for both The Washington Post and Newsweek between 1967 and 1975, while also contributing to The Economist and the Financial Times.

Norton-Taylor joined The Guardian in 1975, concentrating on Whitehall, official secrecy, and behind-the-scenes decision-making. He became an expert on British and Soviet intelligence activities during the Second World War. In 1988, he made an extended appearance on the TV discussion programme After Dark, alongside (among others) Harold Musgrove, Hilary Wainwright and George Brumwell, discussing his book Blacklist: The Inside Story of Political Vetting, co-written with Mark Hollingsworth.

He has written several plays based on transcripts of public inquiries, including The Colour of Justice (1999), based on the hearing of the MacPherson Inquiry into the police conduct of the investigation into the murder of Stephen Lawrence. Another was Justifying War: Scenes from the Hutton Inquiry (2003), both of which premiered at the Tricycle Theatre.

Norton-Taylor left The Guardian in July 2016 and currently writes for Declassified UK.

== Awards ==
In 1986 Norton-Taylor won the Freedom of Information Campaign award. That same year he was prevented initially by a court injunction from reporting the contents of Spycatcher (1987), the memoirs of Peter Wright, a former MI5 agent. The government's injunction was dismissed in the High Court by Lord Justice Scott.

Norton-Taylor was one of the few journalists to cover the Scott Inquiry from start to finish. His play, Half the Picture, based on the inquiry, received a 1994 Time Out Drama, Comedy and Dance award for its "brave initiative".

In 2010, with fellow Guardian journalist Ian Cobain, he was awarded a Human Rights Campaign of the Year Award from Liberty for their "investigation into Britain's complicity in the use of torture" by the United States against detainees at their facility at Guantanamo Bay and at black sites.

== Personal life ==
In 1967, he married Anna C Rendle. He has two children and five grandchildren. His son Hugo is a judge of the Upper Tribunal (Immigration and Asylum Chamber).

Norton-Taylor is a Member of Council of the Royal United Services Institute and a trustee of the Civil Liberties Trust and the London Action Trust.

== See also ==
- British playwrights since 1950
- List of English writers
- List of playwrights by nationality and year of birth
