= J. C. Niala =

Writer, poet, and storyteller

Dr J. C. Niala
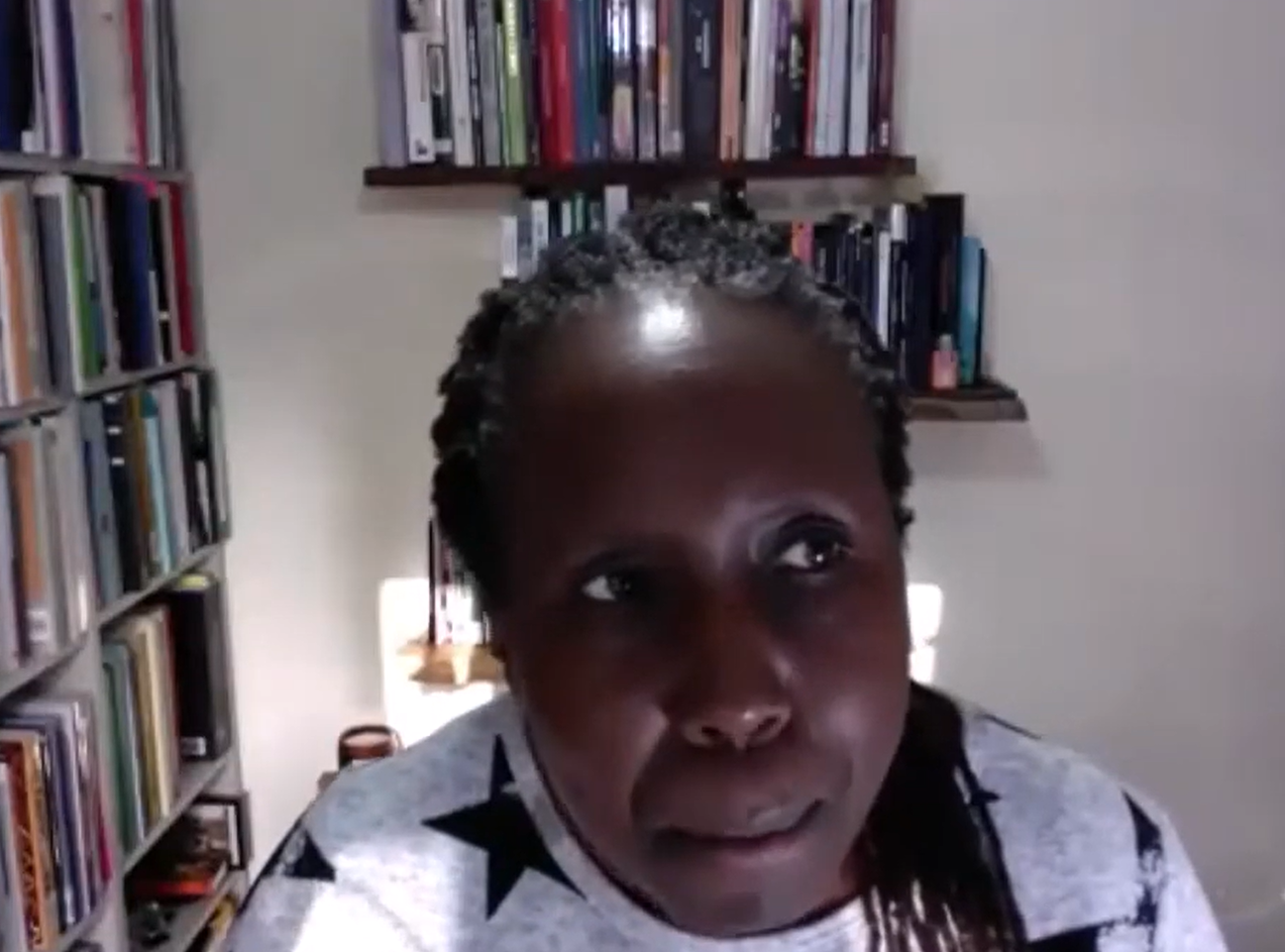
- Niala speaking on a webinar in 2021
- Born: 1975 or 1976 (age 50–51); Kenya
- Occupations: Academic; museum curator; writer

Academic background
- Education: Marlborough College; University of Sheffield; Kellogg College, Oxford; St Catherine's College, Oxford
- Thesis: Banal Utopia: urban gardening as a practice for materialising utopic city spaces (2022)

Academic work
- Discipline: Anthropology
- Sub-discipline: Social anthropology
- Institutions: Horniman Museum; Cambridge University Libraries; History of Science Museum, Oxford
- Writing career
- Language: English; Swahili
- Website: www.jcniala.com

JC Niala is an anthropologist and historian, who has been the Head of Research, teaching, and collection at History of Science Museum, Oxford, since 2022. She is also known for her works as a writer, poet and storyteller.

== Education and academic career ==
Niala did her first degree at the University of Sheffield and worked for 20 years in health care before returning to academia to pursue a career change. She went on to earn an MSt in Creative Writing from Kellogg College, University of Oxford. She later completed doctoral studies in social anthropology at St Catherine's College, Oxford. Her thesis, submitted in 2022, was titled, Banal Utopia: urban gardening as a practice for materialising utopic city spaces.

Before her current work at the History of Science Museum, Oxford, Niala was in charge of the African collections at the Horniman Museum and more recently worked at Cambridge University Libraries as the inaugural Head of World collections. She was also an Honorary Research Fellow at the University of Warwick. Her work aims to empower women.

== Writing ==
Her article "Why African Babies Don't Cry: An African Perspective", has been translated into more than 20 languages and has been used as a training tool by La Leche League and The World Alliance for Breast Feeding. Her parenting articles have been used as resources in a number of books.

=== Screenwriting and play writing ===
Aged 17, Niala filmed by herself a documentary entitled In and Out of Africa that was aired in 1993 on BBC Two as part of their Teenage Diaries Series. Her diaries were also broadcast on BBC Radio 4 as part of the series Messages to Myself, where she was the youngest participant in the programme.

Her works as an adult include the play The Strong Room, which was shortlisted by Wole Soyinka in BBC Africa Performance 2010, the film Wazi? FM, winner of Best Feature Film at the Zanzibar International Film Festival 2015, the 2013 film Something Necessary and the play Unsettled.

Niala's work has been staged at The Africa Centre, London, at the Tate Modern and to celebrate World Theatre Day in New York City. She performs stories in different countries including at the Hay Festival, in Kenya and the UK. Her films have been shown at film festivals around the world including Toronto International Film Festival, Zanzibar International Film Festival, Rotterdam Film Festival among others.

== Personal life ==
Niala was born in Kenya and grew up in her birth country as well as in Ivory Coast and in the United Kingdom, where she was educated at Marlborough College in Wiltshire.

== Works ==
- 2010: The Strong Room (writer)
- 2011: A Kenyan Christmas (writer)
- 2012: Cows are too Big to Eat (editor)
- 2012: Why the Cheetah Hunts at Night (writer)
- 2013: Something Necessary (co-writer)
- 2014: Baby Elephant Safari (writer)
- 2014: Beyond Motherhood: A Guide to Being a Great Working Mother while Living Your Dream (writer)
- 2015: Wazi? FM (screenwriter)
- 2016: A Wordly War: Battle Experiences through the Eyes of African Cultures (writer/producer)
- 2017: A Candid Handbook For Women Doing Business In Kenya (co-writer)
- 2019: Unsettled (writer)

== Awards ==
- 2010: BBC Africa Performance - Shortlist
- 2015: Zanzibar International Film Festival - Best Feature Film
- 2015: European African Film Festivals Award - Best African Film
- 2016: The Oxford Research Centre for the Humanities, University of Oxford - WWI Research Competition - First runner-up
- 2017: Kellogg College Community Engagement and Academic Merit Award
