= Zodwa Nyoni =

Zimbabwean-born poet and playwright (born c. 1988)

- Born: c. 1988 (age 37–38); Zimbabwe
- Education: Roundhay School; Leeds City College; Leeds Beckett University; University of Leeds
- Occupations: Poet and playwright

Zodwa Nyoni (born c. 1988) is a Zimbabwean-born poet and playwright, whose works have been performed at the Leeds Playhouse and the Royal Exchange. She was a finalist in the Susan Smith Blackburn Prize.

== Early life and education ==
Nyoni was born in Zimbabwe around 1988 and she first moved to England in 1992, when she was aged four, because her father was awarded a scholarship to study for a master's degree in the textiles industry. After three years, the family returned to Zimbabwe. After a further three years, in 1999, the family returned to Leeds. At school in Leeds, Nyoni remembers pupils asking her sisters if they had lions and elephants in their garden in Zimbabwe; in Zimbabwe, they were referred to as "the English girls". Nyoni's father taught at a university in Zimbabwe. She is one of seven children, five of them living in Leeds, with two half-siblings in Botswana. She was educated at Roundhay School, Leeds City College, Leeds Beckett University and the University of Leeds.

== Career ==
Her debut play, Boi Boi is Dead, was first performed at the Leeds Playhouse in 2014. It was a finalist for the Susan Smith Blackburn Prize. To prepare the play, Nyoni was awarded a 2013 Channel 4 Playwrights Award. Ode to Leeds was first performed at the Leeds Playhouse in 2017 and was reviewed with three stars by The Guardian. Poetry features throughout the play, as it follows the lives of young spoken-word performers from Leeds.

Nyoni's 2014 play, Nine Lives, was featured in a 2018 article on the migrant condition in British theatre. Early career awards include: Award for the Arts 2011 (Leeds Black Awards), Young Black and Asian Writers Award (The Big Issue in the North's Short Story Competition 2011, and Apprentice Poet-in-Residence at the Ilkley Literature Festival (ILF). Nyoni's next play was announced as due to be staged at the Royal Exchange in Manchester in 2020. Experience of life in African diaspora is central to Nyoni's creativity. A more recent work, debuted at Summerhall in 2019, was A Khoisan Woman - a play about the Hottentot Venus.

== Selected works ==
- Ode To Leeds (Methuen Drama, 2017)
- Nine Lives (Bloomsbury Publishing, 2015)
