= Mustapha Matura =

Trinidad and Tobago playwright (1939–2019)

- Photo: Francine Lawrence
- Born: Noel Mathura; 17 December 1939; Port of Spain, Trinidad and Tobago
- Died: 29 October 2019 (aged 79)
- Occupation: Playwright
- Spouse: Ingrid Selberg
- Writing career
- Language: English
- Notable works: As Time Goes By (1971); Nice (1973); Play Mas (1974); Rum an' Coca Cola (1976); Independence (1979); Welcome Home Jacko (1978); Meetings (1981); Playboy of the West Indies (1984)
- Notable awards: George Devine Award; John Whiting Award; Helen Hayes Award
- Website: mustaphamatura.com

Mustapha Matura (17 December 1939 – 29 October 2019) was a Trinidadian playwright living in London. Characterised by critic Michael Billington as "a pioneering Black playwright who opened the doors for his successors", Matura was the first British-based dramatist of colour to have a play in London's West End, with Play Mas in 1974. He was described by the New Statesman as "the most perceptive and humane of Black dramatists writing in Britain."

== Early years ==
Born Noel Mathura in 1939 to an East Indian father and Creole mother in Port of Spain, Trinidad, he changed his name when he became a writer, and explained: "I liked the sound of it.... It was the sixties."

Leaving the Caribbean, he travelled by ship to England where he arrived in 1962; as he recalled in a 1977 interview: "We went to London and found out the sophistication of our dreams was just a gloss. It was very harsh on the bottom of the ladder." After a year working as a hospital porter, he and fellow Trinidadian Horace Ové went to Rome, Italy, where he worked on stage productions such as Langston Hughes' Shakespeare in Harlem. Matura thereafter decided to write plays about the West Indian experience in London.

== Career ==
=== Plays ===
Matura's play As Time Goes By was first performed in 1971 at the Traverse Theatre Club in Edinburgh, Scotland, and in London at the Theatre Upstairs at the Royal Court, with a cast of Caribbean actors, including Stefan Kalipha, Alfred Fagon, Mona Hammond and Corinne Skinner-Carter.

Play Mas was first performed at the Royal Court in 1974 (with Stefan Kalipha, Rudolph Walker, Norman Beaton and Mona Hammond in the cast), winning Matura the London Evening Standard’s Most Promising Playwright Award that year. It would be revived in 2015 at the Orange Tree Theatre, directed by Paulette Randall in what was described by The Guardian as a "beautifully observed production... a richly informative play that raises big questions about the nature of liberation, and is also hilariously precise about the shifting balance of power." The reviewer for The Arts Desk wrote: "It is surprising that this is the first major revival of Play Mas.... It is exuberant, funny and often charming."

In October 2023, a new production of Meetings was staged by the Orange Tree Theatre, with a cast comprising Kevin N Golding, Martina Laird and Bethan Mary-James, directed by Kalungi Ssebandeke.

Among Matura's subsequent plays were Rum an' Coca Cola (1976), Another Tuesday (Institute of Contemporary Arts, 1978), More, More (The Factory, London, 1978), Independence (1979), A Dying Business (Riverside Studios, 1980); One Rule (Riverside Studios, 1981), Meetings (1981), Playboy of the West Indies (Oxford Playhouse, 1984; produced for BBC television, 1985), Trinidad Sisters (Tricycle Theatre, 1988) and The Coup (Royal National Theatre, 1991).

=== Other literary and cultural work ===
Matura was also a poet, and in Bayswater, West London, in 1971 he performed his epic poem "Elae Elae Ghanga", and featured in an evening of poetry and music on Friday, 29 October, organised by the Caribbean Artists Movement, along with James Berry, T-Bone Wilson, Louis Marriott, Marc Matthews and Archie Markham.

In 1978, he co-founded the Black Theatre Co-operative (now NitroBeat) together with British director Charlie Hanson. "Frustrated by the lack of interest from London Fringe theatres in Matura's new play Welcome Home Jacko, Matura and Hanson set up their own theatre company. Welcome Home Jacko was presented at The Factory in Paddington, west London, in May 1979 and marked the beginnings of the Black Theatre Co-operative. The company supported, commissioned and produced work by Black writers in Britain." Matura was also a member of Penumbra Productions, an independent production company, other members of which included Horace Ové, H. O. Nazareth, Farrukh Dhondy, Michael Abbensetts, Margaret Busby and Lindsay Barrett, and among whose projects was a series of films based on lectures by C. L. R. James in the 1980s.

Matura's work for television included the Channel 4 sitcom No Problem! (1983–85), written by him with Farrukh Dhondy, and Black Silk (BBC, 1985), which he devised in collaboration with Rudy Narayan.

== Personal life and legacy ==
Matura's first marriage, to Marian Walsh, with whom he had two children (Ann and Dominic), ended in divorce. He was subsequently married to Ingrid Selberg, daughter of Norwegian mathematician Atle Selberg, with whom he had two children, Cayal and Maya.

Matura died aged 79 on 29 October 2019, in St. John's, Newfoundland and Labrador, after having a heart attack on a flight from New York, where he had been visiting a grandchild. A celebration of his life and work was held on 8 March 2020 at the Young Vic, directed and curated by Nicolas Kent, Anton Phillips and Paulette Randall.

A musical adaptation of Playboy of the West Indies created by Matura, Clement Ishmael, Dominique Le Gendre and Nicolas Kent opened at the Birmingham Repertory Theatre in June 2022 as part of the Birmingham 2022 Festival.

=== The Mustapha Matura Award and Mentoring Programme ===
In 2021, the Mustapha Matura Award and Mentoring Programme was announced, linked to the Alfred Fagon Award and supported by Matura's estate along with other donors, with the competition being open to emerging young Black playwrights of Caribbean and African descendant up to the age of 25, and including a cash prize and a nine-month mentoring programme with a leading Black British playwright.

== Selected works ==
- Black Pieces (ICA, 1970, dir. Roland Rees)
- As Time Goes By (1971)
- Bakerloo Line (Almost Free Theatre, 1972; performed on BBC2 Full House, 1973)
- Nice (Almost Free Theatre, 1973)
- Play Mas (1974)
- Bread (Young Vic, 1976)
- Rum an' Coca Cola (Royal Court Theatre and off-Broadway, 1976)
- Another Tuesday (Institute of Contemporary Arts, 1978)
- More, More (The Factory, London, 1978)
- Independence (1979)
- Welcome Home Jacko (The Factory, London, 1978)
- A Dying Business (Riverside Studios, 1980)
- One Rule (Riverside Studios, 1981)
- Meetings (Phoenix Theatre, New York, 1981; Hampstead Theatre, 1982)
- Playboy of the West Indies (1984)
- Trinidad Sisters (based on Chekhov's Three Sisters; 1988)
- The Coup (Cottesloe Theatre, 1991)
- A Small World (Arena Stage, 1994)

== Bibliography ==
- Matura: Six Plays: "As Time Goes By", "Nice", "Play Mas", "Independence", "Welcome Home Jacko" and "Meetings", Bloomsbury Publishing, 2007, ISBN 978-0413660701
- Three Sisters. After Chekhov, London: Oberon Books, 2006, ISBN 978-1840026436
- Playboy of the West Indies, Broadway Play Publishing Inc., 1989, ISBN 978-0881450606. London: Oberon Books, 2010, ISBN 978-1840029246
- Moon Jump (illus. J. Gifford), Heinemann Young Books, 1988, ISBN 978-0434949441
- Meetings, New York: Samuel French, 1982, ISBN 978-0573618642
- Nice, Rum an' Coca Cola & Welcome Home Jacko: Three Plays, London: Eyre Methuen, 1980, ISBN 978-0413477200
- As Time Goes By, London: Marion Boyars Publishers Ltd, 1972, ISBN 978-0714508832

Contributor

- The Methuen Drama Book of Plays by Black British Writers, 2011.

== Awards and honours ==
Matura received a number of awards and honours throughout his career, in the UK and in Trinidad, including:

- 1971: The George Devine Award.
- 1971: The John Whiting Award.
- 1974: The Evening Standard Most Promising Playwright Award.
- 1991: Trinidad National Award – the Scarlet Ibis Gold.
- 1994: The Helen Hayes Award.
- 2014: The Alfred Fagon Award for Outstanding Contribution to Writing.
- 2016: Honorary Fellowship of Goldsmiths, University of London.

== Archives ==
The Mustapha Matura archive – which contains unpublished work, including two plays, one on The Life of Boysie Singh – was acquired by the British Library in 2025.
