= Tiata Fahodzi =

British theatre company

Tiata Fahodzi (ti∙a∙ta fa∙hoon∙zi) – meaning "theatre of the emancipated" – is a British African theatre company founded in 1997 by Femi Elufowoju Jr. It receives funding as a National Portfolio Organisation of the Arts Council England.

Previous artistic directors include Femi Elufowoju Jr (1997–2010) and Lucian Msamati (2010–2014). Natalie Ibu became the company's third artistic director in 2014. In March 2021, Chinonyerem Odimba became the current artistic director as the company prepared for its 25th anniversary in 2022.

== Emerging artists ==
Fahodzi is noted for showcasing new British African talent with many artists gaining their first professional experiences with the company before achieving success at the national and international level. These artists include Bola Agbaje, who is now a Laurence Olivier Award winning playwright and Adetomiwa Edun, now internationally known as an actor, most notably as Sir Elyan in the TV show Merlin.

== Residency ==
In 2015, Tiata Fahodzi became a resident company at Watford Palace Theatre, gaining an operational base for the first time in its history.

== See also ==
- Alfred Fagon Award
- Black British Theatre Awards
- Talawa Theatre Company
