= Sonali Bhattacharyya =

English playwright

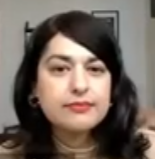
- In a HowlRound video in 2021
- Born: 1978 (age 47–48); Leicester, England
- Education: Royal Holloway, University of London
- Family: Gargi Bhattacharyya (sibling)
- Website: www.sonaliwrites.com

Sonali Bhattacharyya is an English playwright and screenwriter. Her play Chasing Hares won the Sonia Friedman Production Award and a Theatre Uncut Award, while King Troll (The Fawn) was a finalist for the Women's Prize for Playwriting. Her other plays include Two Billion Beats and Liberation Squares.

== Early life ==
Bhattacharyya was born at Leicester Royal Infirmary to parents who had moved from Kolkata. Her father, a lecturer, was born in Rangoon, Burma and had to flee the Japanese army in 1943, while her mother, a social worker, grew up in Chittagong (then part of India). Her older sibling is Gargi Bhattacharyya.

Bhattacharyya graduated from Royal Holloway, University of London and then pursued a Master of Arts (MA) at an art school in London. She took part in the 2008 BBC Writers Academy.

== Career ==
Through Naylah Ahmed, Bhattacharyya started writing radio plays and on the soap operas Silver Street, EastEnders and Holby City. For the rural Shropshire theatre company Pentabus and the 2006 Edinburgh Fringe Festival, Bhattacharyya contributed an installment titled Two Men in the Fog to White Open Spaces, a collection of seven plays.

Alongside Ahmed, Bhattacharyya co-created the play These Four Walls with Lorna French, Jennifer Farmer, Amber Lone and Cheryl Akila Payne. The 2009 play was commissioned by the Birmingham Repertory Theatre and was created based on interviews with those affected by the Lozells Riot in 2005.

Bhattacharyya was selected for the 2015 inaugural Old Vic 12 emerging writers scheme. She wrote 2066, directed by Dani Parr at the Almeida Theatre in 2016; Slummers as part of Home Truths, a 2017 collection of plays about the housing crisis at The Bunker; Behind the Blast Wall in Sahar Speaks at Theatre503; and The Invisible Boy for the Tricycle Theatre.

In 2018, Bhattacharyya was one of five to receive the Channel 4 Playwrights' Scheme bursary, supported by the Orange Tree Theatre. It was here she wrote Chasing Hares, which won the 2019 Sonia Friedman Production Award and the 2021 Theatre Uncut Political Playwriting Award. The play is set in the West Bengal Dunlop factory amid a trade union dispute. Chasing Hares had its official premiere in 2022 at the Young Vic. The production was directed by Milli Bhatia.

Also in 2022 premiered Bhattacharyya's Two Billion Beats earlier in the year. Directed by Georgia Green and starring Zainab Hasan and Ashna Rabheru as the lead British Asian sisters growing up in Leicester, Two Billion Beats was showcased as part of the Orange Tree Theatre's Inside/Outside series. Bhattacharyya also co-wrote Silence, a stage adaptation of Kavita Puri's non-fiction book about the Partition of India, with Gurpreet Kaur Bhatti, Ishy Din and Alexandra Wood. It premiered at the [[Donmar Warehouse]]. Bhattacharyya contributed Assembly: The Teachers' Play to The Key Workers Cycle at the Almeida.

For the 2023 holiday season, Bhattacharyya was commissioned to write family stage adaptations of Arabian Nights and The Jungle Book for Bristol Old Vic and Chichester Festival Theatre's youth theatre respectively.

Bhattacharyya reunited with director Milli Bhatia for her 2024 plays Liberation Squares, a satire about teenagers who get caught up in the Prevent programme, and King Troll (The Fawn), described as "Home Office horror", at Nottingham Playhouse and the New Diorama Theatre respectively. King Troll (The Fawn) was a finalist for the Women's Prize for Playwriting. Bhattacharyya contributed to Cutting the Tightrope: The Divorce of Politics from Art, a collection of short plays written in response to censorship surrounding Palestine in the arts. She was also commissioned again by the Bristol Old Vic to write an adaptation of The Little Mermaid, which premiered that December in a production directed by Miranda Cromwell.

== Other ventures ==
Bhattacharyya became involved in the Labour Party circa 2017 when she was elected BAME Officer of her local Momentum branch in Waltham Forest.

== Plays ==
=== Solo ===
- A Thin Red Line (2007)
- 2066 (2016)
- The Invisible Boy (2017)
- Two Billion Beats (2022)
- Chasing Hares (2022)
- Arabian Nights (2023)
- The Jungle Book (2023)
- Liberation Squares (2024)
- King Troll (The Fawn) (2024)
- The Little Mermaid (2024)

=== Collaborations ===
- Two Men in the Fog, part of White Open Spaces (2006)
- These Four Walls (2009), co-created
- Slummers in Home Truths (2017)
- Behind the Blast Wall in Sahar Speaks (2017)
- Silence (2022), co-written
- Assembly: The Teachers' Play in The Key Workers Cycle (2022)
- Cutting the Tightrope: The Divorce of Politics from Art (2024)
