= Iman Qureshi =

British writer, artist, film programmer, and activist

- Born: 1985 or 1986 (age 39–40); Pakistan
- Education: University of Edinburgh
- Occupations: Playwright; screenwriter; journalist

Iman Qureshi is a London-based writer, awarded the PAPAtango prize for new writing for her play 'The Funeral Director' in 2018. Her work explores themes of race, gender, and sexuality, and she has spoken openly about her identity as a Muslim and her desire to create community and political change through her work.

== Early life and education ==
Qureshi was born in Pakistan before moving to Saudi Arabia as a child, and then to London in 2003. She studied for a law degree and for an MSc in Postcolonial Literature.

== Career ==
Qureshi worked for the homelessness charity Shelter before her writing career was established. In 2018, PAPAtango collaborated with the English Touring Theatre to co-produce Qureshi's prize-winning play 'The Funeral Director', with a premier in London at the Southwark Playhouse, followed by performances in Edinburgh, Manchester, Nottingham and Oxford. This was the first time that PAPAtango had co-produced a play.

In 2019, 'My White Best Friend' series at the Bunker Theatre, curated by Rachel De-lahay and Milli Bhatia, featured a monologue written by Qureshi.

Qureshi was commissioned by Tamasha and Titi Dawudu to write two monologues for 'Hear me now', published by Oberon books.

Qureshi wrote a short play, Birthday Begum, as writer in residence at Mulberry School for Girls, funded by Tamasha's 'Re Fuel' project, with performances at Rich Mix and Theatre Royal Stratford East.

Her play, The Funeral Director, is being adapted for the screen with STV Productions. Her play, The Ministry of Lesbian Affairs, is also being adapted with NBCUniversal. She is one of 5 writers selected for ViacomCBS International Studios’ VIS unit's "First Look Deal Program."

Qureshi has written comment pieces for the Huffington Post, Guardian, and Independent.

== Accolades ==
Qureshi's play 'The Funeral Director' was shortlisted for Soho Theatre's Tony Craze Award in 2017, before winning the PAPAtango Prize in 2018. The play was selected top of 1,384 entries.

Qureshi was one of the Soho Six playwrights for 2019 at the Soho Theatre, London, and she was selected for the Genesis Almeida New Playwrights Big Plays programme in 2019/2020.

Qureshi's short film, 'Home Girl', directed by Poonam Brah, was featured in the Film London 'London Calling' film festival, and the 2019 BFI Flare Festival.

== Works ==
=== Plays ===
- Speed (Kali Theatre at the Tristan Bates Theatre, 2013)
- The Funeral Director (PAPAtango / English Touring Theatre, 2018)
- The Ministry of Lesbian Affairs (London's Soho Theatre and Kiln Theatre, 2022 and 2025, respectively)
- His and Hers (Soho Theatre)
- Side Effects (directed by Cheryl Ndione, Canary Wharf Roof Garden and Poplar Union)
- The Ceremony (Open Sky Theatre, 2020)

=== Monologues ===
- 'The Passport Thing', featured in 'My White Best Friend' (Bunker Theatre, 2019, Oberon Books/ Bloomsbury, 2020)
- 'Hear me now' (Oberon Books, 2019)

=== Film ===
'Home Girl' (directed by Poonam Brah, 2018).
