= Robert Boulter =

English film, television and theatre actor

- Born: 30 November 1986 (age 39)
- Education: Spotlight Musical Theatre School
- Occupation: Actor
- Years active: 2000-present
- Known for: Donkey Punch, Daylight Robbery, Casualty, Mercenaries
- Spouse: Stephanie Leonidas (m. 2016)
- Children: 1

Robert Boulter is an English film, television and theatre actor. He had a guest-starring role on the television series The Bill in 2000. This was followed by a starring role in the play Herons written by Simon Stephens, which was performed in 2001 at the Royal Court Theatre. He had a guest role in the television series Judge John Deed in 2002. In 2004 Boulter landed a role as "Craig" in the episode "Teddy's Story" of the television series The Long Firm. He was cast in the 2005 he played Darren in the world premiere of the Philip Ridley play Mercury Fur, which was performed at the Drum Theatre in Plymouth and the Menier Chocolate Factory in London.

In 2006, Boulter starred in the play Citizenship written by Mark Ravenhill. He appeared on a 2006 episode of the television series, Doctors, followed by a role in the 2007 theatre production of How to Curse directed by Josie Rourke. How to Curse was performed at Bush Theatre in the London Borough of Hammersmith and Fulham. Boulter starred in two films in 2008, Daylight Robbery by filmmaker Paris Leonti, and Donkey Punch directed by Olly Blackburn. In May 2008, Boulter made a guest appearance on a two-part episode arc of the television series Waking the Dead, followed by an appearance on the television series Survivors in November 2008. He had a recurring role in ten episodes of the television series Casualty in 2010, as "Kieron Fletcher". Boulter starred in the 2011 film Mercenaries directed by Paris Leonti.

== Career ==
In 2000, Boulter had a guest-starring role on the television series The Bill; he portrayed "Scott Parry" in the episode, "In Safe Hands". Boulter starred as "Scott" in the play Herons written by Simon Stephens, which was performed in 2001 at the Royal Court Theatre. A review of Boulter's performance in The Independent on Sunday described him as "horribly menacing" in the role, and he received critical reviews in The Herald, and Evening Standard. He appeared in the television series Judge John Deed in 2002 as "Addem Armitage" in the episode "Political Expediency", and had a role as a different character "Toby Steele" on The Bill.

He had a recurring role in 2003 on two episodes of The Bill, as character "Connor Price". In 2004 Boulter landed a role as "Craig" in the episode "Teddy's Story" of the television series The Long Firm. Boulter starred as "Darren", in the 2005 theatre productions of the Philip Ridley play Mercury Fur. It was performed at the Drum Theatre in Plymouth, and the Menier Chocolate Factory in London. Boulter received a favorable review in The Daily Telegraph: "The acting is shatteringly intense, with wired performances from Ben Whishaw (now unrecognisable from his performance as Trevor Nunn's Hamlet), Robert Boulter, Shane Zaza and Fraser Ayres." The Guardian noted, "Ben Whishaw and Robert Boulter offer tenderness amid the savagery."

In 2006, Boulter starred in the play Citizenship written by Mark Ravenhill. The play was part of a series which featured different playwrights, titled Burn/Chatroom/Citizenship. In a 2006 interview, fellow actor Ben Whishaw identified Boulter as one of his favorite co-stars: "I loved working with a guy called Robert Boulter, who was in the triple bill of Burn, Chatroom and Citizenship at the National. He played my brother in Mercury Fur." He portrayed "Jason Tyler" on the 2006 episode of the television series, Doctors, titled "Something I Ate". Boulter starred as "William" in the 2007 production of How to Curse directed by Josie Rourke. How to Curse was performed at Bush Theatre in the London Borough of Hammersmith and Fulham. In a review of the production for The Daily Telegraph, theatre critic Charles Spencer noted, "Robert Boulter brings a touching vulnerability to the stage as William."

Boulter starred in two films in 2008, Daylight Robbery by filmmaker Paris Leonti, and Donkey Punch directed by Olly Blackburn. Boulter portrayed a character named "Sean" in Donkey Punch, who tags along with character "Josh" as the "quiet brother ... who hits it off with Tammi". Boulter guest starred on a two-part episode arc "Wounds" in May 2008 of the television series Waking the Dead as character "Jimmy Dearden". He appeared on the television series Survivors as "Neil" in November 2008. He had a recurring role in ten episodes of the television series Casualty in 2010, as "Kieron Fletcher". He portrayed an emergency physician applying for a medical fellowship. He commented on the inherent difficulties in portraying a physician on television: "Playing a doctor is a strange experience. Pretending you know what you're talking about when you don't is very bizarre but there are advisers on set who are fantastic at taking you through procedures and giving you the confidence to stand there and look like you know what you're doing." Boulter starred in the 2011 film Mercenaries directed by Paris Leonti.

Boulter initially had a role in Star Wars: The Force Awakens as a stand-in for Mark Hamill as a young Luke Skywalker, but his scene was cut from the final film. In April 2021, he made another appearance in the BBC soap opera Doctors as Owen Charlton.

== Personal life ==
He married actress Stephanie Leonidas on New Year's Eve 2016.

== Filmography ==
=== Film ===
Year	Film	Role	Director	Notes
2008	Donkey Punch	Sean	Olly Blackburn	
2008	Daylight Robbery	Jay	Paris Leonti	
2011	Mercenaries	Lucas	Paris Leonti	
2015	Star Wars: The Force Awakens	Luke Skywalker	J. J. Abrams	Body double for Mark Hamill. Deleted scene
2024	We Live in Time	Dr. Hernandez	John Crowley	

=== Television ===
Year	Title	Role	Notes
2000	The Bill	Scott Parry	Episode: "In Safe Hands"
2002	Judge John Deed	Addem Armitage	Episode: "Political Expediency"
2002	The Bill	Toby Steele	Episode: "018"
2003	The Bill	Connor Price	Episodes: "151", "152"
2004	The Long Firm	Craig	Episode: "Teddy's Story"
2006	Doctors	Jason Tyler	Episode: "Something I Ate"
2008	Waking the Dead	Jimmy Dearden	Episodes: "Wounds: Part 1", "Wounds: Part 2"
2008	Survivors	Neil	Episode: #1.1
2010	Casualty	Kieron Fletcher	Episodes: #24.26 — 24.35
2014	Suspects	Kirk Hawthorne	Episode: 1.2
2014	Father Brown	Alan Archer	Episode: 2.3 "The Pride of the Prydes"
2021	Doctors	Owen Charlton	Episode: "The Lost Boy"

=== Theatre ===
Year	Production	Director
2001	Herons	Simon Usher
2005	Mercury Fur	John Tiffany
2006	Burn/Chatroom/Citizenship	Anna Mackmin
2007	How to Curse	Josie Rourke
2008	The Odyssey	Tom Cairns
2011	Merchant of Venice	Peter Meakin
2011	A Midsummer Night's Dream	Poppy Morgan
2014	Revolt. She Said. Revolt Again.	Erica Whyman
2014	The Ant and The Cicada	Erica Whyman
2014	I Can Hear You	Jo McInnes
2016	Revolt. She Said. Revolt Again	Erica Whyman
