= Ellie Keel =

Ellie Keel (born 13 November 1991) is a British writer, theatre producer, and the founder and director of the Women's Prize for Playwriting.

== Early life and education ==
Keel studied modern languages (German and Italian) at Brasenose College at Oxford University, graduating with First Class Honours in 2014. After graduating, she worked for the Cameron Mackintosh Foundation and the Oxford Playhouse as the university drama officer, overseeing all student theatre productions at Oxford University.

== Career ==
=== Producer ===
In 2016, Keel co-founded (with Lucy Maycock, Ria Parry and John Hoggarth) Alchymy Festival at The North Wall, Oxford to support and showcase the work of early-career theatre-makers. In 2018, the Oxford Culture Review stated ‘There are so many good things to say about the Alchymy Festival that it’s hard to know where to begin.’

In 2019, Keel founded her production company, Ellie Keel Productions (EKP), to create "fearlessly imaginative, endlessly exciting" new work across the UK and internationally. EKP’s productions include:

- Hotter and Fitter by Mary Higgins and Ell Potter (Soho Theatre)
- Collapsible by Margaret Perry (VAULT Festival, HighTide's Disruption Festival, Dublin Fringe & Bush Theatre)
- Anna Bella Eema by Lisa D’Amour (Arcola Theatre)
- Callisto: a queer epic by Hal Coase (Pleasance, Edinburgh & Arcola Theatre)
- Mrs Dalloway by Hal Coase (Arcola Theatre)
- SAP by Rafaella Marcus (Roundabout @ Summerhall, Edinburgh, Soho Theatre & UK National Tour)
- The Last Show Before We Die by Mary Higgins and Ell Potter (Roundabout @ Summerhall, Edinburgh)
- Bullring Techno Makeout Jamz by Nathan Queeley-Dennis (Roundabout @ Summerhall, Edinburgh, Royal Court Theatre & UK National Tour)
- An Interrogation by Jamie Armitage (Summerhall, Edinburgh & Hampstead Theatre)
- Bellringers by Daisy Hall (Roundabout @ Summerhall, Edinburgh & Hampstead Theatre)

In 2024 Keel won the Producer of the Year in The Stage Awards, becoming the youngest ever to win in this category.

=== The Women's Prize for Playwriting ===
In 2019, Keel co-founded the Women's Prize for Playwriting with Paines Plough to champion female and non-binary playwrights in the UK and Ireland. The prize launched later the same year. The prize launched later the same year. Past winners have included Amy Trigg (2020) and Sarah Grochala (2023).

In 2024, Keel was nominated for the Olivier Award for Outstanding Achievement in Affiliate Theatre for her work on The Swell by Isley Lynn, which was shortlisted for the prize in 2020 and ran at the Orange Tree Theatre in 2023.

=== Writer ===
In April 2024, Keel’s first novel The Four was published by HQ, an imprint of HarperCollins. On publication, the novel became an instant Sunday Times bestseller. Keel’s second novel will be published by HQ in 2026.
