= Jasmine Lee-Jones =

British playwright and actress

- Born: 1998 (age 27–28); London
- Other name: Jasmine Jones
- Education: Guildhall School of Music and Drama
- Occupations: Playwright; screenwriter; actress
- Writing career
- Subjects: Racism, cultural appropriation, Black British identity, womanhood
- Notable work: seven methods of killing kylie jenner (2019)
- Notable awards: Alfred Fagon Award (2019); Windham–Campbell Literature Prize for Drama (2023)

Jasmine Lee-Jones, sometimes credited as Jasmine Jones, is a Black British playwright and actress, known for her debut play, seven methods of killing kylie jenner (Note: The play's title is intentionally stylised in all lower-case by the playwright.), which premiered at Royal Court Theatre in 2019.

== Early life and education ==
Lee-Jones was born in 1998 in North London and grew up in South London. She took parts in youth theatres in her teens, starring in Globe Young Players' production of Dido, Queen of Carthage and The Malcontent when she was 16. She was a member of Royal Court Theatre's Young Writers programme from the age of 17.

Lee-Jones went on to study acting at the Guildhall School of Music and Drama, supported by the Laurence Olivier bursary in her final year. She graduated with a Bachelor of Arts in 2019.

== Career ==
=== Playwriting ===
Lee-Jones has had training experiences with Royal Court Theatre from the age of 17 and it was at this venue that she would go on to make her professional debut as a playwright. In 2017, Lee-Jones was selected for a bespoke playwriting programme for young women called "The Andrea Project", in honour of the late playwright Andrea Dunbar. During the six-week programme, organised by Royal Court in collaboration with Out of Joint Theatre Company, Lee-Jones received training and guidance from award-winning playwright Rachel De-lahay, and started writing what was to become seven methods of killing kylie jenner. The play, often shortened to seven methods..., was further developed as part of the Jerwood New Playwright programme at Royal Court, where it was eventually premiered in 2019. The play has earned Lee-Jones several accolades, notably the Alfred Fagon Award, annually awarded to the best new play by a Black British author. The play was revived at Royal Court Theatre in 2021 and has also been performed internationally in Australia, New Zealand, the United States, Canada, and Luxembourg. seven methods... has also been translated into Swedish and was toured across Sweden in 2022.

In 2020, Lee-Jones wrote black pain redux, a monologue performed by Paapa Essiedu at Young Vic as part of the venue’s 50th anniversary celebration. The following year, her second full length play, curious, was staged at Soho Theatre, with Lee-Jones also performing in the show.

In 2021, Lee-Jones was a finalist in the inaugural Gold and Ruth Harris Commission competition at the New York Theatre Workshop. The commission had been set up by Tony Award nominated playwright Jeremy O. Harris and awarded each finalist a cash prize of US$12,500 in support of their artistic endeavours. In 2023, Lee-Jones won the Windham–Campbell Literature Prize in the Drama category, awarded with a cash prize of US$175,000. She is the youngest person to achieve this accolade.

=== Screenwriting ===
In 2017, while she was still a student, Lee-Jones was selected for the BBC writers’ room London Voices scheme.

Having broken into the theatre scene in 2019 with seven methods…, Lee-Jones was, alongside 13 other playwrights, commissioned by Headlong to write a short television play for BBC Four's lockdown series Unprecedented in 2020. Lee-Jones’s piece, batshit, a monologue delivered by Kae Alexander, was included in episode 5 and released exclusively on BBC iPlayer.

Also in 2020, Lee-Jones was commissioned by Young Vic to write a short play in collaboration with the homelessness charity Thames Reach. Due to the outbreak of COVID-19 and lockdown restrictions, the project had to be adapted and instead a short film was made. Home(body), directed by Milli Bhatia, was released via YouTube with a premiere on 28 January 2021.

In 2021, Lee-Jones was selected for BFI Flare x BAFTA Crew, a mentoring programme for LGBTQ filmmakers. Her mentor on the programme was Terence Nance. In 2022, Lee-Jones took residency at MacDowell, where she worked on a screen adaptation of her 2021 play, curious.

=== Acting ===
As an actress, Lee-Jones has appeared in E4's Dead Pixels (2021) and ITV1's The Long Shadow.

== Artistry ==
Lee-Jones's writing has been noted for its realism through her use of Internet speak, references to memes and pop culture, as well as Black British vernacular English. She was dubbed "Gen-Z Shakespeare" by Playbill Magazine in their review of seven methods... in 2023. Lee-Jones explained the realism of her writing, "my duty as a writer is to tell the truth of what I see around me as I see it and not be unhelpfully concerned with how it will be received by an audience. My primary focus should be reflecting the voices of those I see and know honestly."

Lee-Jones's work often explores serious topics such as racism and cultural appropriation while also "strik[ing] a comic tone". According to the playwright herself, this is partly to make it easier for the audience to consider polarising topics from a different perspective.

Lee-Jones has cited playwrights Lorraine Hansberry, debbie tucker green, August Wilson, Roy Williams, Jackie Sibblies Drury, Branden Jacobs-Jenkins, Trevor Rhone, and Andrea Dunbar as her influences.

== Personal life ==
Lee-Jones does not use social media, having left these platforms at the end of 2020.

== Writing credits ==
=== Plays ===
Year premiered	Title	Notable productions	Note
2019	seven methods of killing kylie jenner	2019, 2021 - Royal Court Theatre (London); 2021 - Eternity Playhouse (Sydney); 2022 - La Boite Theatre (Brisbane); Silo Theatre (Auckland); touring production across Sweden, produced by Riksteatern; 2023 - The Public Theater (New York); Woolly Mammoth Theatre (Washington DC); Malthouse Theatre (Melbourne); 2024 - Crow's Theatre (Toronto); 2026 - Luxembourg tour	All productions were performed in English except for the touring production in Sweden (2022), which was performed in the Swedish language.
2019	My White Best Friend (and Other Letters Left Unsaid)	2019 - The Bunker	Commissioned by Rachel De-lahay and Milli Bhatia
2020	black pain redux	2020 - Young Vic (part of the 50th anniversary celebration programme entitled The New Tomorrow)	Short play
2021	I Used to Lover H.E.R.	2021 - Atlantic Theater Company (part of a virtual festival, African Caribbean MixFest)	
2021	curious	2021 - Soho Theatre	One woman show; also performer

=== Films ===
Year	Title	Director	Note
2021	Home(body)	Milli Bhatia	Short film commissioned by Young Vic in partnership with Thames Reach.

=== Television ===
Year	Title	Network/Channel	Note
2020	Unprecedented	BBC Four	Short play Batshit, aired in episode 5.

=== Published playtexts ===
- Lee-Jones, Jasmine (2023). seven methods of killing kylie jenner. Modern plays (Reprinted ed.). London: Methuen Drama. ISBN 978-1-350-27748-9.
- Lee-Jones, Jasmine (2021). curious. Modern plays (1st ed.). London: Methuen Drama. ISBN 978-1-350-29266-6.
- Lee-Jones, Jasmine (2020). "Jasmine Lee-Jones". In De-lahay, Rachel (ed.). My White Best Friend (And Other Letters Left Unsaid). London: Oberon Books. ISBN 978-1-7868-2901-6.

== Acting credits ==
Year	Title	Role	Channel/Network	Note
2021	Dead Pixels	Police officer	E4	Series 2, Episode 4
2023	The Long Shadow	Marcella Claxton	ITV1	5 episodes

== Awards and nominations ==
Year	Award	Category	Nominated work(s)	Result	Note
2019	Alfred Fagon Award		seven methods of killing kylie jenner	Won	
2019	The Stage Debut Awards	Best Writer	seven methods of killing kylie jenner	Won	
2019	Evening Standard Theatre Awards	Charles Wintour Awards for Most Promising Playwright	seven methods of killing kylie jenner	Won	
2020	Critics' Circle Theatre Award	Most Promising Playwright	seven methods of killing kylie jenner	Won	
2020	James Tait Black Memorial Prize	Drama	seven methods of killing kylie jenner	Shortlisted	
2020	European Drama Award	European New Talent Drama Award	seven methods of killing kylie jenner	Won	
2020	Laurence Olivier Awards	Outstanding Achievement in an Affiliate Theatre	seven methods of killing kylie jenner - Original production at Royal Court Theatre	Nominated	
2021	New York Theatre Workshop's Gold and Ruth Harris Commission		Body of work	Finalist	
2023	Windham–Campbell Literature Prizes	Drama	Body of work	Won	
