= Theatre Deli =

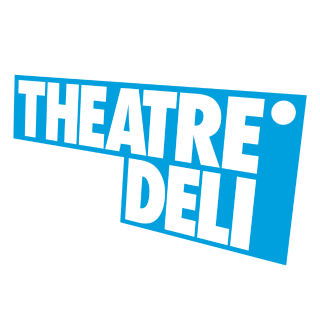

Theatre Deli (formerly Theatre Delicatessen) is a meanwhile-use arts organisation that transforms empty spaces into creative venues. Theatre Deli’s work focuses on empty spaces in city centres, and has included more than 17 venues across five London boroughs and Sheffield. As well as providing affordable space, Theatre Deli offers artist development opportunities in the form of commissions, residencies, festivals, workshops, events and work-in-progress performance programmes.

Theatre Deli is the trading name of charity CurvingRoad. Its annual report states: “We believe in the social, psychological, political and economic benefits of making and experiencing art and culture. Our mission is to empower and enable people to make art for themselves, for others and for their communities. To deliver this, we believe in doing things differently … changing spaces … changing perceptions … changing careers.”

Theatre Deli currently operates in the City of London and Tower Hamlets, with its main venue at 107 Leadenhall Street.

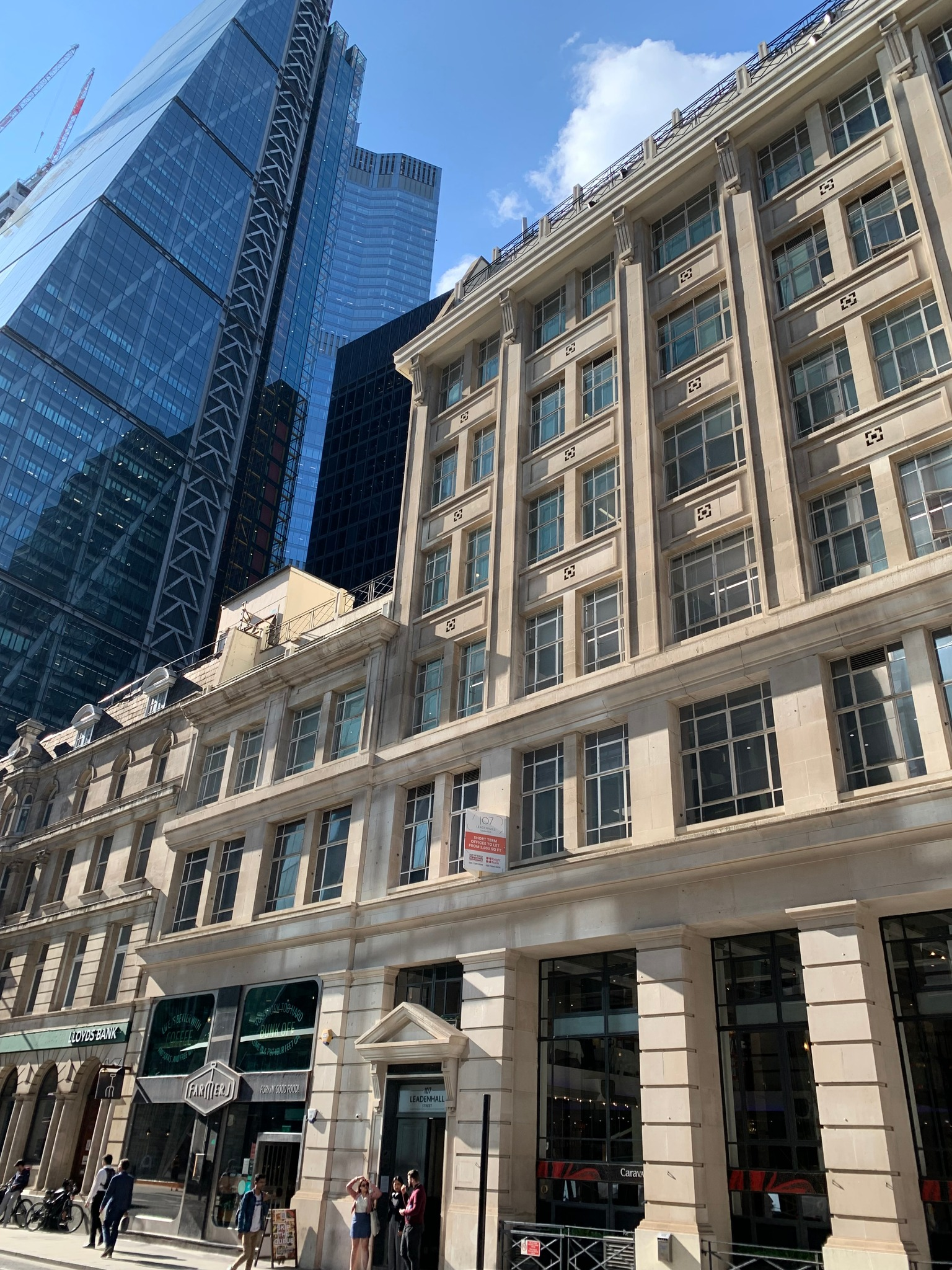
Theatre Deli is currency based in 107 Leadenhall Street

== History ==
Theatre Delicatessen was founded by Jessica Brewster, Frances Loy, Mauricio Preciado Awad and Roland Smith in 2007.

Over the first decade of its existence Theatre Deli transformed 10 empty buildings, opened up over 200,000 square feet for rehearsal studios, workspaces and performances, and put £1.7million directly into the hands of artists, becoming instrumental in the development of early career theatremakers.

In June 2017, Theatre Deli partnered with British Land, GIC and The Nursery Theatre to create a workspace for artists at Broadgate, London.

Theatre Deli's Chair since 2019 has been Pam Fraser Solomon FRSA; previously a senior BBC Drama producer, she is now the Head of MA in Creative Producing at Mountview.

In April 2020, Theatre Deli appointed a new executive director, David Ralf, who was previously the executive director of The Bunker theatre.

The charity opened its current main site at 107 Leadenhall St in London in 2022 with the Ground Floor and Mezzanine. In 2025 the organisation doubled its capacity by taking on an additional two floors of the building, and an adjacent retail unity with support of the Eastern City Business Improvement District.

In 2025, the charity partnered with New Diorama Theatre to launch The Allotment a programme to give away free development space to artists by lottery, with 50% of spaces reserved for companies led by underrepresented artists, building on the legacy of NDT Broadgate.

The organisation's former locations include retail units on Eyre Street & The Moor in Sheffield City Centre, as well as 2 Finsbury Avenue, Broadgate, a Passmore Edwards Library in Burgess Park, 119 Farringdon Road (previously headquarters of The Guardian, 35 Marylebone High Street in a building previously occupied by the BBC, 3-4 Picton Place, and Cavendish Gate, 295 Regent Street.

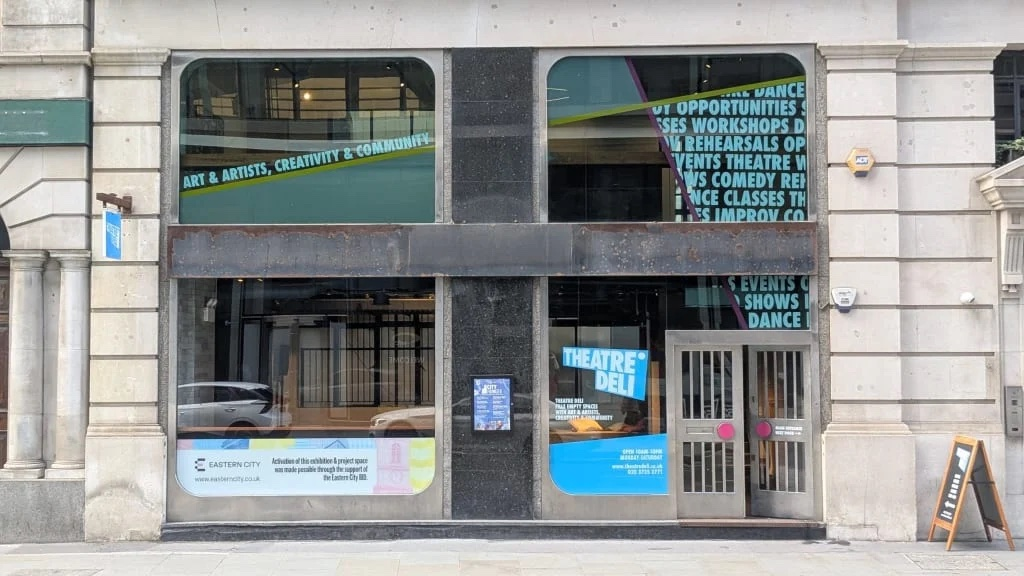
Theatre Deli doubled its capacity in September 2025

== Artistic Objectives ==
Alongside providing subsidised rehearsal and community space, Theatre Deli supports and invests in artists through residencies, drop-ins, festivals, co-productions, and in-kind support, with a focus on emerging artists, companies and communities whose identities, backgrounds, disciplines or work are underrepresented in theatre.

In 2024, Theatre Deli paid over £20,000 directly to artists in fees and commissions, plus over £22,000 in box office splits, and gave away over £64,000 in discounted and in-kind space.

== Notable festivals ==
- January 2018 to present: The Smoke Festival - London's annual chamber larp festival
- November 2025: Voila 2025
- August 2025: City Fringe ... Produced by Esther Hallas Smith
- July 2025: Voidspace Live
- November 2024: Voila 2024
- November 2023: Social Model… & More Festival … Curated by Caroline Mawer, produced by Esther Hallas Smith & Miranda Debenham
- October 2023: Black Joy produced by Black Lives Natter CIC
- July 2021: Pandemic in the City ... Produced by Katherine Webb
- Sept–Oct 2010: Theatre Souk ... curated by Jessica Brewster
- Nov–Dec 2009: Tis the Season to be Jolly...As F**k ...a Christmas theatre festival

== Notable Productions ==
- Ongoing: Jury Duty by Jury Games
- June 2021-July 2022: The Perfect Crime ... Created and produced by Rogue Productions
- Feb–Mar 2010: Mercury Fur ... by Philip Ridley
- Jul–Aug 2009: Pedal Pusher ... by Roland Smith
- Apr–Mar 2009: The Winter's Tale ... by William Shakespeare
- Dec 2008: Elle and the Cabaret of the Cavendish Club ... by Roland Smith
- Jul–Aug 2008: Fanshen ... by David Hare
- Jan–Mar 2008: A Midsummer Night's Dream ... by William Shakespeare
