= Alexandra Wood =

Alexandra Wood may refer to:

- Alexandra Wood (violinist) (born 1977), British violinist
- Alexandra Wood (dramatist), British dramatist
