= Rachel De-lahay =

British playwright

Rachel De-lahay MBE
- Born: 1983 or 1984 (age 42–43); Birmingham
- Education: London Academy of Music and Dramatic Art; Academy of Live and Recorded Arts
- Occupations: Playwright; screenwriter
- Writing career
- Genre: Drama
- Subjects: Immigration, racism, identity
- Notable awards: Alfred Fagon Award (2010); Writers' Guild Award for Best Theatre Play (2012)

Rachel De-lahay MBE (born 1983 or 1984) is a British playwright and screenwriter from Birmingham. She was made a Member of the British Empire (MBE) for service to Drama in the 2023 New Year Honours.

== Early life and education ==
De-lahay was born in Handsworth, Birmingham. Her father was from Saint Kitts and Nevis and her British-born mother grew up in Pakistan. She identifies as mixed race and brown and does not describe herself as "Black". She is estranged from her father and was brought up by her mother, who worked as a nurse.

De-lahay was a pupil at King Edward VI Handsworth School for Girls. As a child, she attended Stage2 Youth Theatre Company in her native Birmingham as well as taking parts in National Youth Theatre in London. She later studied acting at London Academy of Music and Dramatic Art and the Academy of Live and Recorded Arts.

== Career ==
=== Theatre ===
Originally an actress, De-lahay has credited the Unheard Voices scheme at Royal Court Theatre as her first stab at writing. Her first play, SW11 (later renamed The Westbridge), won the Alfred Fagon Award in 2010 and was subsequently produced at Royal Court to positive reviews. She went on to also win Writers' Guild Award for Best Theatre Play with The Westbridge. Her second full-length play, Routes, also premiered at Royal Court Theatre in 2013. For this play, she won the Charles Wintour Award for Most Promising Playwright at the Standard Theatre Awards.

In 2013, De-lahay was one of the recipients of the Pearson Playwrights' Scheme bursary, which included a commissioned play for Birmingham Repertory Theatre in her hometown. The result was Circles, a play set in the city’s circular bus route 11, once known for being the longest urban bus route in Europe. The play was premiered at the Birmingham Repertory in 2014, followed by a run at Tricycle theatre (now Kiln Theatre) and a tour of local theatres in the West Midlands. Circles earned De-lahay the Catherine Johnson Award for Best Play.

In 2025, Birmingham Repertory Theatre announced its commissioning of De-lahay to write another play for the venue: a new stage adaptation of Charlotte Brontë’s Jane Eyre.

=== Radio and Television ===
De-lahay was selected for the BBC's Writersroom 10 development scheme in 2011/12, in a partnership with Bush Theatre. She has since got her works broadcast on BBC Radio 3 and BBC Radio 4. She was a writer of the BBC's immersive murder mystery film, The Last Hours of Laura K, in which she also starred as Laura Kitchens. The show was subsequently nominated for a BAFTA TV Craft Award for Digital Ceativity in 2016. Her other TV writing credits include: Kiri (Channel 4, 2018), Noughts + Crosses (BBC, 2020), and Dead Ringers (Amazon Prime Video, 2023).

In 2018, De-lahay was named among 18 screenwriters selected for the BAFTA Elevate scheme, which aimed at screenwriters from underrepresented backgrounds.

== My White Best Friend (and Other Letters Left Unsaid) ==
My White Best Friend is a short play that De-lahay wrote in 2017. Its premise has since inspired three festivals (one of which took place virtually) curated by De-lahay herself, as well as performances and writings by other theatre makers.

=== My White Best Friend (2017) ===
De-lahay first wrote the monologue My White Best Friend for Bush Theatre's Black Lives, Black Words Festival, taking place from 23 to 25 March 2017. De-lahay's play takes the form of a letter that the playwright has written to be read by her White best friend, "presented as though the best friend is reading the letter for the first time in a shared public space unaware of what will come up in the letter or the difficult emotions that the content could produce". A central theme of the piece is microaggression and the White best friend's failure to challenge it in support of the letter's author.

My White Best Friend was included in an anthology of 32 short plays, alongside 31 other pieces that had been performed at Black Lives, Black Words festivals in the US (where the movement originated), Canada, and the UK. The anthology was edited by Reginald Edmund, founder of the festival, and published by Oberon in 2017.

=== Bunker Theatre festivals (2019) ===
The monologue was performed again in 2019, this time alongside letters from 11 other writers in a week-long festival (18-23 March) at The Bunker Theatre. The festival, titled My White Best Friend (and Other Letters Left Unsaid) was co-curated by De-lahay and director Milli Bhatia. The writers who contributed letters to the festival were: Zia Ahmed, Travis Alabanza, Fatimah Ashgar, Nathan Bryon, Matilda Feyiṣayọ Ibini, Jammz, Iman Qureshi, Anya Reiss, Nina Segal and Tolani Shoneye. Each night of the festival featured a different selection of letters performed by a rotation of 13 cast members. Following the premise of De-lahay's original monologue, the performers read the letters live for the first time without having seen or rehearsed the materials. The festival was positively reviewed, noted for its engaging and provocative nature, as well as the creative use of the theatre space, resembling a party or a club night. A second run of the festival took place at the same venue, and with the same premise, from 25 to 30 November 2019. This time, the selection of letters were written by Ash Sarkar, Nikesh Shukla, Suhaiymah Manzoor-Khan, Lena Dunham, Inua Ellams, Rabiah Hussain, Mika Onyx Johnson, Jasmine Lee-Jones, Shireen Mula, Joel Tan, Jack Thorne, and Emma Dennis-Edwards.

The 23 letters performed at The Bunker in 2019 was compiled by De-lahay into an anthology, published by Oberon Books in 2020.

=== Online festival (2020) ===
My White Best Friend (and Other Letters Left Unsaid) was recommissioned by Royal Court Theatre for online performances in 2020. De-lahay and Bhatia returned as co-curators and worked with 10 new writers: Amma Asante, Elliot Barnes-Worrel, Ryan Calais Cameron, Clint Dyer, Afua Hirsch, Yasmin Joseph, Tife Kusoro, Lettie Precious, Campbell X, and Rachael Young. The online festival ran between 13 and 17 July, each night featuring 2 new letters in addition to a recording of De-lahay's original piece performed by Ines De Clercq at the beginning.

2020 Cast
Letter's author	Reader
Amma Asante	Rosamund Pike
Elliot Barnes-Worrell	Alex Lawther
Afua Hirsch	Anne-Marie Duff
Yasmin Joseph	Paapa Essiedu
Campbell X	Martina Laird
Rachael Young	Adelayo Adedayo
Tife Kusoro	Danielle Vitalis
Clint Dyer	Neil Maskell
Ryan Calais Cameron	Lucian Msamati
Lettie Precious	Sinead Matthews

=== My White Best Friend - North ===
De-lahay's monologue and festivals inspired a series of festivals in the North of England in 2021 - a collaboration between Eclipse Theatre in Leeds, Everyman Theatre, Liverpool, as well as Playhouse Theatre and Royal Exchange Theatre in Manchester. The commissioned monologues were edited into an anthology, titled "My White Best Friend - North", published by Methuen Drama in 2023.

== Works ==
=== Plays ===
Year	Title	Venue(s)	Note / Refs
2011	The Westbridge	Royal Court Theatre	
2012	Pussy Riot	Royal Court Theatre	
2013	Routes	Royal Court Theatre	
2013	Peckham: The Soap Opera	Royal Court Theatre	
2014	My Twin (Short play)	Royal Court Theatre	
2014	School Gate	Produced by Royal Court Theatre; filmed for online publication by The Guardian	Microplay, part of the Off the Page series
2014	Circles	Birmingham Repertory Theatre, Tricycle Theatre, and West Midlands tour	
2017	My White Best Friend	Bush Theatre	
2017	I Have Aids	Young Vic	
2018	An Elephant Alone	The Old Vic	
2019	The Hole	National Youth Theatre production at The Old Rep	
2019	My White Best Friend (and Other Letters Left Unsaid)	The Bunker (2019); Royal Court Theatre (online performance, 2020)	
2020	Balcony Bonding	Online performance - commissioned by Papatango Theatre Company	

=== Television ===
Year	Title	Channel/Network	Note	Refs
2015	The Last Hours of Laura K	BBC	Also starring as Laura Kitchens	
2018	Kiri	Channel 4	Episode 2	
2018	Snatches: Moments from Women's Lives	BBC Four	Episode 8 - Tipping Point	
2019	The Feed	Amazon Prime Video	Episode 3 and 9	
2020	Noughts + Crosses	BBC One	Season 1, Episode 6	
2020	The Eddy	Netflix	Guest writer, episode 4	
2023	Dead Ringers	Amazon Prime Video	Episode 3	
2025	Too Much	Netflix	Staff writer	

=== Radio ===
Year	Title	Programme	Station	Refs
2012	LockSmiths	The Verb	BBC Radio 3	
2013	Carnival		BBC Radio 4	

=== Published playtexts and books ===
- De-lahay, Rachel (2011). The Westbridge. London: Methuen Drama. ISBN 978-1-4081-7201-8.
- De-lahay, Rachel (2013). Routes. London: Bloomsbury. ISBN 978-1-4725-2624-3.
- De-lahay, Rachel (2014). Circles. Drama & performance studies. London: Bloomsbury. ISBN 978-1-4725-9191-3.
- De-lahay, Rachel (2017). "My White Best Friend". In Edmund, Reginald (ed.). Black Lives, Black Words: 32 Short Plays. London: Oberon Books. pp. 172–180. ISBN 978-1-78682-151-5.
- De-lahay, Rachel (2018). "Tipping Point". In Featherstone, Vicky (ed.). Snatches: Eight Monologues. London: Nick Hern Books. ISBN 978-1-84842-788-4.
- De-lahay, Rachel, ed. (2020). My White Best Friend (And Other Letters Left Unsaid). London: Oberon Books. ISBN 978-1-7868-2901-6.

== Awards and nominations ==
Year	Award	Category	Nominated work(s)	Result	Note/Refs
2010	Alfred Fagon Award		SW11 (later renamed The Westbridge)	Won	Joint winner with Sucker Punch by Roy Williams
2012	Writers' Guild Awards	Best Theatre Play	The Westbridge	Won	
2013	Standard Theatre Awards	Charles Wintour award for most promising playwright	Routes	Won	
2014	Catherine Johnson Award for Best Play		Circles	Won	
2016	BAFTA Television Craft Awards	Best Digital Creativity	The Last Hours of Laura K	Nominated	
2019	BAFTA Television Awards	Best Mini-Series	Kiri	Nominated	
2024	Peabody Awards	Entertainment Series	Dead Ringers	Won	
