= The Stage Awards =

Awards to recognise theatrical achievements

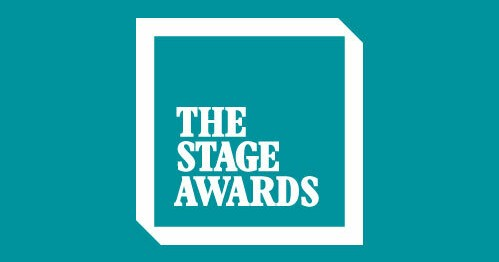
- Logo
- Date: 2011; 15 years ago
- Venue: Theatre Royal, Drury Lane, London
- Country: United Kingdom
- Most awards: Sheffield Theatres (Regional Theatre of the Year - 4)
- Website: www.thestage.co.uk
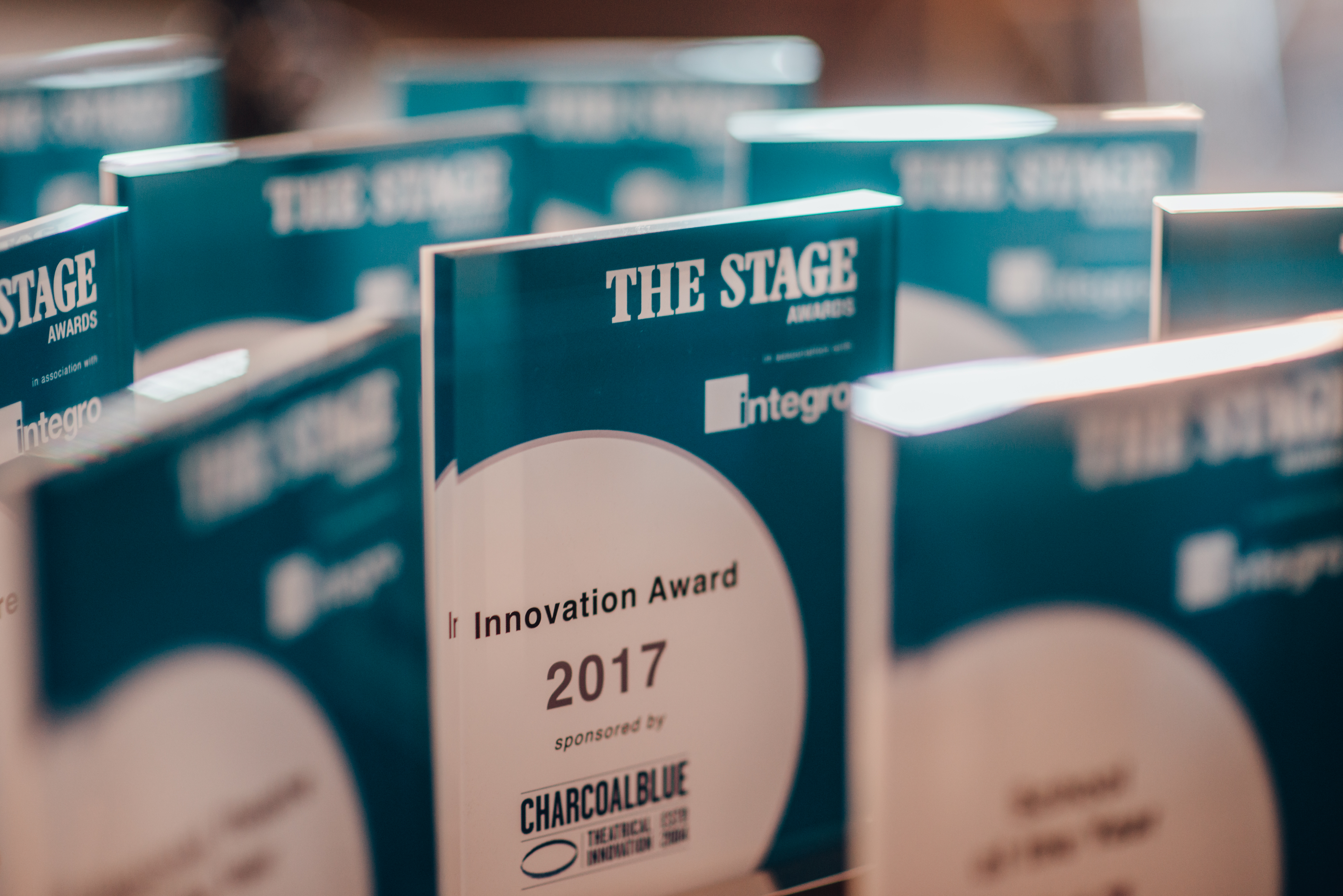
- The 2017 Stage Awards trophy

The Stage Awards are theatre awards created by The Stage to recognise and celebrate theatrical achievements across the UK and internationally. Established in 2011, the awards recognise accomplishments by West End theatres, regional theatre, fringe theatres, producers, drama schools and more. The awards ceremony is held annually on the final Friday of January at the Theatre Royal Drury Lane, London. In 2020, the awards relocated to a new venue, the Royal Opera House.

In 2021, while there was no shortlist or physical ceremony, the awards were re-imagined to celebrate individuals and performing arts organisations that went above and beyond during the coronavirus pandemic to keep theatre alive. Winners include Theatre Support Fund +, which was awarded the Innovation Award for its extraordinary fundraising achievements for theatre workers and the NHS.

For 2022, The Stage Awards returned to the Theatre Royal Drury Lane, its former home of nine years, and took place in the auditorium for the first time following its multi-million pound renovation.

Notable winners include Sonia Friedman, who won the Producer of the Year award three times in a row between 2015 and 2017, and Sheffield Theatres, which has won Regional Theatre of the Year four times – in 2013, 2014, 2017 and 2020.

Originally known as The Stage 100 Awards, the awards ceremony was held at The Stage's New Year Party and set out to recognise parts of the theatre industry which weren't recognised at other awards.

== Judging process ==
Any performing arts organisation, regardless of size, is able to be nominated for The Stage Awards. An open nominations process allows any individual to nominate themselves or another organisation they admire. After nominations are submitted by the public, the judging panel consult 50 leading figures within the UK theatre industry, working across all sectors, and ask for their input for the long list. At this point, senior figures within The Stage's editorial team are also consulted. Finally, a judging panel meet to consider all submissions, choosing the shortlist and winners.

The judging panel has included The Stage's current managing director, Alistair Smith, previous editor Brian Attwood, associate editor Mark Shenton, associate editor Lyn Gardner, theatre critic Aleks Sierz, theatre critic Susan Elkin, current editor Matt Hemley, reviews editor Natasha Tripney, critic Tim Bano, features editor Nick Clark, former Theatrical Management Association president AK Bennett Hunter, reporter Natalie Woolman.

In 2021, the judging panel was composed of The Stage's Alistair Smith, Daily Mail entertainment columnist Baz Bamigboye, Get Into Theatre director Ahmet Ahmet, critic for The Guardian Arifa Akbar, columnist for The Stage and critic for Variety David Benedict, features editor of The Stage Nick Clark, associate editor for The Stage Lyn Gardner, news editor of The Stage Matt Hemley, chief reporter of The Stage Georgia Snow and reviews editor of The Stage Natasha Tripney.

== Awards categories ==
When first established, the only categories were Regional Theatre of the Year, London Theatre of the Year, Fringe Theatre of the Year, Producer of the Year and School of the Year.

The Unsung Hero Award was added in 2012, to recognise individuals who had made a key contribution to the theatre industry out of the limelight. In its first year, the award was presented to three individuals: Edwin Shaw, Heather Miller and Frances Coyle.

Two new categories were added for 2015: Theatre Building of the Year and the International Award. The Theatre Building of the Year award can be given to any physical structure of space hosting theatrical performances. The International Award was set up to recognise achievements with an international element, including touring abroad or working in collaboration.

For 2017, two further categories were introduced: the Innovation Award and the Sustainability Award. The first category aims to recognise new design, technical or creative developments in the sector, and the latter category celebrates environmental initiatives undertaken by performing arts organisations.

For 2020, the Achievement in Technical Theatre award was introduced to celebrate excellence in technical theatre, recognising the superb work that has been going on behind the scenes in theatres and performance spaces all over the country.

As the industry emerged from the coronavirus pandemic, The Stage adapted its award categories in 2021 to reflect the way British theatre was responding to a changing world. This included introducing two new categories – Digital Project of the Year and Community Project of the Year – and removing what seemed like an unnecessary distinction between work taking place in London and elsewhere in the UK to create a Theatre of the Year award.

2026 categories at The Stage Awards:

- Theatre of the Year
- Fringe Theatre of the Year
- Theatre Building of the Year
- Community Award
- International Award
- Innovation Award
- Campaign of the Year
- Team of the Year
- Unsung Hero

== The Unsung Hero Award ==
First introduced in 2012, the award is presented to individuals who have made an outstanding contribution to the performing arts industry. Edwin Shaw, Heather Miller and Frances Coyle were the inaugural winners of the award.

Edwin Shaw worked in the West End for more than 50 years, and served as box office manager at the London Palladium for more than 35 years. Nominated by producers David Pugh and Dafydd Rogers, they said: "not a day goes by" when producers from across Theatreland do not consult Shaw. Heather Miller won for her work as a chaperone on numerous productions in the West End and on tour including Oliver!, Mary Poppins and Chitty Chitty Bang Bang. She was nominated by casting director Jo Hawes, who worked with Miller for more than 17 years. Frances Coyle was presented with the award for her work at Glasgow's Citizens Theatre, where she worked for more than 40 years having joined the venue in 1967.

In 2013, the Unsung Hero award was given to Anne McNulty and Chris Isherman. Anne McNulty was awarded for her 20-year career at the Donmar Warehouse as its casting director. Nominated by artistic director Josie Rourke, she was praised for unearthing talent including Tom Hiddleston and Lara Pulver. Chris Isherman was presented with the Unsung Hero award for his long standing service as the theatre manager of the Duchess Theatre, London. Nominated by producer James Seabright, he was described as "one of the last of the ‘old school’ theatre managers” that still sported a dinner jacket and greeted every audience member with care and attention before every production."

Theatre consultant Andy Collier was honoured with the Unsung Hero award posthumously in 2014. The award was collected by his son Ben Collier.

The 2015 award was presented to Sue Nightingale, Birmingham Repertory Theatre's head of wardrobe for her extensive career and commitment to theatre outside of the limelight.

Stage manager Roger Miller was named Unsung Hero at The Stage Awards 2016. He won the award for his work towards saving the Felixstowe Spa Pavilion Theatre.

Ned Seago won the Unsung Hero award at The Stage Awards 2017. Seago has worked at the Old Vic, London for more than 30 years with artistic director Matthew Warchus calling him "unfailingly sensitive, kind, discrete, loyal and supportive".

At The Stage Awards 2018, the award was presented to interior designer Clare Ferraby. Ferraby is behind the interiors of more than 80 theatres, including the London Palladium and the Theatre Royal, Nottingham, as well as the refurbished Victoria Palace, home of Hamilton.

Pat Nelder, capital development associate at Theatre Clwyd since 1977, was awarded the Unsung Hero accolade in 2019. He joined the theatre as a junior member in the LX department, but has since worked in various roles and is now the capital development associate. The theatre's artistic director Tamara Harvey said: "Quietly, constantly and with unceasing humility, he is the very best of us."

In 2020, front of house assistant Mary Joseph at the Almeida Theatre was the recipient of the Unsung Hero award. While she started working at the Almeida as a cleaner in 1995, Joseph now works six days a week – mainly in the box-office kiosk. Having worked at the north London theatre for a quarter of a century, Joseph is the “essence of the Almeida” according to its artistic director Rupert Goold.

At The Stage Awards 2022, the award was presented to understudies and covers. Collecting the award on behalf of their colleagues across the UK were four understudies and a swing: Claire Darcy (understudy on Cinderella at Eden Court, Inverness), Natasha Leaver (understudy on Hamilton at the Victoria Palace Theatre, London), Sam Lupton (understudy on the Bedknobs and Broomsticks UK Tour), Ben McDaid (understudy on Sleeping Beauty at the Millennium Forum, Derry), and Harveen Mann (Swing on the School of Rock UK Tour).

== Previous Winners ==
=== The Stage Awards 2026 ===
Category	Winner
Theatre of the Year	Royal Court Theatre, London & Watermill Theatre, Newbury
Producer of the Year	Wessex Grove
Theatre Building of the Year	Soho Theatre Walthamstow, Walthamstow
Fringe Theatre of the Year	Hope Mill Theatre, Manchester
Innovation Award	Hull Truck Theatre
International Award	Foreign Affairs
Campaign of the Year	Black Power Desk
Team of the Year	Lyric Theatre, Belfast’s Lyric Scene Shop
Unsung Hero	Eugene Ju-Pierre, Royal Ballet and Opera
Community Award	Common/Wealth
Judges' Award	Nick Hern
The Stage 100	Michael Sheen

=== The Stage Awards 2025 ===
Category	Winner
Theatre of the Year	Nottingham Playhouse / Orange Tree Theatre, London
Producer of the Year	Michael Harrison Entertainment
Theatre Building of the Year	The Well Walk Theatre, London
Innovation Award	Orchard West, Dartford
International Award	Projekt Europa
Unsung Hero	Mike Elliott, Bristol Old Vic Theatre
Community Award	Synergy Theatre Project
Judges' Award	Michael Patrick, The Tragedy of Richard III at the Lyric Theatre, Belfast
Campaign of the Year	Kim’s Convenience Park Theatre and Adam Blanshay Productions

=== The Stage Awards 2024 ===
Category	Winner
Theatre of the Year	National Theatre, London & Watermill Theatre, Newbury
Fringe Theatre of the Year	Little Angel Theatre, London
Producer of the Year	Ellie Keel Productions
Theatre Building of the Year	Roundhouse Works, London
Digital Project of the Year	Parade-Fest and Artists on the Frontline for With Fire and Rage
Innovation Award	ZU-UK for Within Touching Distance
International Award	Battersea Arts Centre, London
Unsung Hero	Chichester Festival Theatre’s Theatre Manager, Kanet Bakose
Community Project of the Year	Culture Collective
Judges' Award	Chickenshed

=== The Stage Awards 2023 ===
Hosted by the cast of For Black Boys Who Have Considered Suicide When the Hue Gets too Heavy - Mark Akintimehin, Emmanuel Akwafo, Nnabiko Ejimofor, Darragh Hand, Aruna Jalloh and Kaine Lawrence.

Category	Winner
Theatre of the Year	Bush Theatre, London & Lyric Theatre, Belfast
Fringe Theatre of the Year	Alphabetti Theatre, Newcastle
Producer of the Year	Improbable
Theatre Building of the Year	Shakespeare North Playhouse, Prescot
Digital Project of the Year	Derby Theatre for Odyssey
Innovation Award	Sam Crane/Rustic Mascara for Hamlet in Grand Theft Auto
International Award	Another Route
Unsung Hero	Front of House staff
Community Project of the Year	Luca Silverstrini's Protein for There and Here

=== The Stage Awards 2022 ===
Hosted by Shan Ako and Sam Tutty.

Category	Winner
Theatre of the Year	Battersea Arts Centre, London & Marlowe Theatre, Canterbury
Fringe Theatre of the Year	New Diorama Theatre, London
Producer of the Year	Michael Harrison Entertainment
Theatre Building of the Year	Theatre Royal Drury Lane, London
Digital Project of the Year	National Theatre's Romeo and Juliet
Innovation Award	Theatre Green Book
Unsung Hero	Understudies and covers
Community Project of the Year	Company Three and Nick Hern Books’ When This is Over

=== The Stage Awards 2021 ===
Category	Winner
Regional Theatre of the Year	Theatr Clwyd, Mold
London Theatre of the Year	Kiln Theatre
Fringe Theatre of the Year	Jermyn Street Theatre, London
Producer of the Year	Nica Burns
International Award	Belarus Free Theatre
Innovation Award	Theatre Support Fund +
Achievement in Technical Theatre	Simon Baker, technical director and digital producer at Wise Children

=== The Stage Awards 2020 ===
Category	Winner
Regional Theatre of the Year	Sheffield Theatres
London Theatre of the Year	Queen's Theatre Hornchurch
Fringe Theatre of the Year	The Bunker Theatre, London
Theatre Building of the Year	Leeds Playhouse
Producer of the Year	ATG Productions
International Award	Selladoor Worldwide
Innovation Award	Artistic Directors of the Future for its work to diversify theatre boards
Achievement in Technical Theatre	Sheffield Theatres
Unsung Hero	Mary Joseph

=== The Stage Awards 2019 ===
Category	Winner
Regional Theatre of the Year	Nottingham Playhouse
London Theatre of the Year	Bush Theatre
Fringe Theatre of the Year	Barn Theatre, Cirencester
Theatre Building of the Year	Battersea Arts Centre, London
Producer of the Year	Sonia Friedman Productions
School of the Year	Open Door, London and the East Midlands
International Award	Hijinx Theatre, Cardiff
Innovation Award	New Diorama Theatre, London for its programming model
Sustainability Award	Lyric Hammersmith, London
Unsung Hero	Pat Nelder

=== The Stage Awards 2018 ===
Category	Winner
Regional Theatre of the Year	Sherman Theatre, Cardiff
London Theatre of the Year	Almeida Theatre
Fringe Theatre of the Year	Hope Mill Theatre, Manchester
Theatre Building of the Year	Bridge Theatre, London
Producer of the Year	Hull City of Culture
School of the Year	Royal Exchange Young Company
International Award	Imaginate for the Edinburgh International Children's Festival
Innovation Award	The Everyman Company, Liverpool
Sustainability Award	Arcola Theatre, London
Unsung Hero	Clare Ferraby

=== The Stage Awards 2017 ===
Category	Winner
Regional Theatre of the Year	Sheffield Theatres
London Theatre of the Year	Regent's Park Open Air Theatre
Fringe Theatre of the Year	New Diorama Theatre, London
Theatre Building of the Year	Kings Cross Theatre
Producer of the Year	Sonia Friedman Productions
School of the Year	Musical Theatre Academy
International Award	Matthew Bourne's New Adventures
Innovation Award	Complicite
Sustainability Award	Tara Theatre, London
Unsung Hero	Ned Seago

=== The Stage Awards 2016 ===
Category	Winner
Regional Theatre of the Year	Royal Exchange, Manchester
London Theatre of the Year	Almeida Theatre
Fringe Theatre of the Year	The Other Room, Cardiff
Theatre Building of the Year	NT Future, London
Producer of the Year	Sonia Friedman
School of the Year	Arts Educational Schools London
International Award	War Horse China
Unsung Hero	Roger Miller

=== The Stage Awards 2015 ===
Category	Winner
Regional Theatre of the Year	Nuffield Theatres, Southampton
London Theatre of the Year	Young Vic
Fringe Theatre of the Year	Park Theatre, London
Theatre Building of the Year	Liverpool Everyman and Roundabout Theatre, Paines Plough
Producer of the Year	Sonia Friedman
School of the Year	Young Everyman Playhouse, Liverpool
International Award	Shakespeare's Globe, London
Unsung Hero	Sue Nightingale

=== The Stage Awards 2014 ===
Category	Winner
Regional Theatre of the Year	Sheffield Theatres
London Theatre of the Year	Hampstead Theatres
Fringe Theatre of the Year	Southwark Playhouse, London
Producer of the Year	Michael Grandage Company
School of the Year	National Youth Theatre
Unsung Hero	Andy Collier

=== The Stage Awards 2013 ===
Category	Winner
Regional Theatre of the Year	Sheffield Theatres
London Theatre of the Year	Shakespeare's Globe
Fringe Theatre of the Year	Union Theatre, London
Producer of the Year	A Play, A Pie and A Pint
School of the Year	ALRA North
Unsung Hero	Anne McNulty and Chris Isherman

=== The Stage Awards 2012 ===
Category	Winner
Regional Theatre of the Year	Chichester Festival Theatre
London Theatre of the Year	Bush Theatre
Fringe Theatre of the Year	Jermyn Street Theatre, London
Producer of the Year	National Theatre, London
School of the Year	Musical Theatre Academy
Unsung Hero	Edwin Shaw, Heather Miller and Frances Coyle

=== The Stage Awards 2011 ===
Category	Winner
Regional Theatre of the Year	Northampton Royal and Derngate
London Theatre of the Year	The Royal Court Theatre
Fringe Theatre of the Year	Finborough Theatre, London
Producer of the Year	English Touring Theatre
School of the Year	Sylvia Young Theatre School

== See also ==
- The Stage
- The Stage Debut Awards
- The Stage Awards for Acting Excellence
