= Jasmine Lee =

Jasmine Lee may refer to:

- Jasmine Bacurnay Lee, Filipino-Korean actress and civil servant
- Jasmine Lee-Jones, British playwright
- Jasmine Lee, the fictional grandmother of Juniper Lee
- Jasmine Lee (sprinter) winner of the 2006 NCAA 4 × 100 meter relay championship
