= Karis Kelly =

Northern Irish writer (born 1987)

- Born: Karis Eleanor Halsall; 1987 (age 38–39)
- Other names: Karis Halsall; Karis E Halsall
- Education: Royal Central School of Speech and Drama; Goldsmiths, University of London
- Years active: 2008–present

Karis Eleanor Halsall (born 1987), also known as Karis Kelly, is a playwright and screenwriter. Her (Note: Kelly uses she/her and they/them pronouns.) play Consumed won the Women's Prize for Playwriting.

== Early life and education ==
Kelly was born in North West London to a Northern Irish Protestant mother and Catholic father and mostly grew up in Harrow. Her parents had moved to London from Bangor in the 1970s and later returned to live in Northern Ireland. Kelly identifies as both London Irish and Northern Irish.

Kelly attended St Benedict's School in Ealing, where her father was a teacher. She graduated with a Bachelor of Arts (BA) in Theatre Practice from the Royal Central School of Speech and Drama in 2009. She later completed a Master of Arts (MA) in Script Writing at Goldsmiths, University of London in 2018 and also trained at the National Film and Television School.

== Career ==
Kelly has been writing under the name Karis Halsall or Karis E Halsall since 2008. Kelly had a post at the Bush Theatre and served as Literary Associate of the Theatre503 and Artistic Director of Luminary Theatre. For the latter in 2014, Kelly was one of four playwrights alongside Raul Quiros Molina, Bahar Brunton and Isley Lynn to contribute to the play Little Stitches, based on real life accounts of FGM.

Kelly's absurdist performance piece Hysterical was staged at the 2016 Brighton Fringe and won the People's Choice Award at the VAULT Festival. As a screenwriter, Kelly has contributed three episodes to the BBC One Northern Ireland series Hope Street.

In response to receiving an obsessive–compulsive disorder (OCD) diagnosis in late 2020, Kelly started researching her heritage and wrote Consumed, a 90th birthday family drama depicting four generations of Northern Irish women across political and religious lines. Consumed won the 2021–2022 Women's Prize for Playwriting. Kelly was also awarded the 2022 Film4 and Peggy Ramsay Foundation Resident Playwright bursary at the Lyric Theatre, Belfast. Directed by Katie Posner of Paines Plough, Consumed was previewed at the Belgrade Theatre before premiering at the 2025 Edinburgh Fringe Festival and going on a tour.

== Personal life ==
Kelly is based between Brighton and Bangor. Kelly has dyslexia and OCD.
