= Women's Prize for Playwriting =

The Women's Prize for Playwriting is the leading award for female and non-binary playwrights in the UK and Ireland.

== History of the prize ==
The Women's Prize for Playwriting was founded by Ellie Keel and theatre company Paines Plough to redress the balance of voices reaching main stages in the UK and Ireland. The 2025 winner will receive a prize of £20,000, an option for the stage by Ellie Keel Productions, the Women's Prize for Playwriting, Paines Plough and Sheffield Theatres as well as a publishing deal with Concord Theatricals.

The inaugural prize received 1,163 submissions and was jointly won by two plays, Reasons You Should(n't) Love Me by Amy Trigg and You Bury Me by Ahlam. Reasons You Should(n't) Love Me is a one-woman play exploring growing up with spina bifida and navigating love, your twenties and loneliness. It premiered at the Kiln Theatre, London, reopening the theatre after the pandemic in May 2021. It toured the UK before returning to the Kiln Theatre in November. You Bury Me is a political play set in Cairo about a generation emerging from national trauma, determined to live and love freely. It had a reading at the Edinburgh International Festival in 2022 and opened at the Bristol Old Vic in February 2023 before touring to the Edinburgh Lyceum and London's Orange Tree Theatre.

The 2021 Prize was awarded to Consumed by Karis Kelly. The play is a tinderbox of four generations of Irish women coming together for a 90th birthday with explosive results. The winner was selected from 850 submissions and is currently in development.

The 2023 Prize was awarded to Intelligence by Sarah Grochala. The play explores the life of computer pioneer Ada Lovelace and her struggles being recognised in a male-dominated world. Chosen from over 1000 submissions, Intelligence is in development.

The 2025 Prize was awarded to Sapling by Georgina Duncan. Duncan's play was selected as the winner from 1275 submissions, and follows a family during the last grasps of The Troubles.

== Recipients ==
Year	Author	Title	Result
2020	Amy Trigg	Reasons You Should(n't) Love Me	Winner
2020	Ahlam	You Bury Me	Winner
2020	Chinonyerem	Paradise Street	Shortlisted
2020	Eve Leigh	Red Sky at Night	Shortlisted
2020	Liv Hennessy	Colostrum	Shortlisted
2020	Miriam Battye	The Virgins	Shortlisted
2020	Babirye Bukilwa	...blackbird hour	Shortlisted
2021	Karis Kelly	Consumed	Winner
2021	Abi Zakarian	Mountain Warfare	Shortlisted
2021	Alison Carr	Birdie	Shortlisted
2021	Isabella Leung	A Bouffon Play About Hong Kong	Shortlisted
2021	Isley Lynn	Furies	Shortlisted
2021	Lydia Luke	upright enuf	Shortlisted
2021	Paula B Stanic	4 Decades	Shortlisted
2021	Somebody Jones	How I learned to Swim	Shortlisted
2023	Sarah Grochala	Intelligence	Winner
2023	Daisy Hall	Bellringers	Shortlisted
2023	Emma Gibson	Lumin	Shortlisted
2023	Shaan Sahota	The Angels Were Worms	Shortlisted
2023	Sonali Bhattacharyya	King Troll (The Fawn)	Shortlisted
2025	Georgina Duncan	Sapling	Winner
2025	Billie Esplen	Fucking Jane Austen	Shortlisted
2025	Manjinder Virk	The Room	Shortlisted
2025	Danielle James	THREE BOYS	Shortlisted
2025	Phoebe Eclair-Powell	The (Yellow) Wallpaper	Shortlisted
