= Liv Hennessy =

English playwright

Olivia Hennessy is an English playwright. She adapted Vardy v Rooney: The Wagatha Christie Trial for the West End, which was nominated for a Laurence Olivier Award. Her first play Colostrum was a finalist for the Women's Prize for Playwriting.

== Early life ==
Hennessy is from Hereford. She joined the Young Writers programme at Pentabus in Shropshire.

== Career ==
Hennessy began her career working as a story editor on the soap opera Emmerdale. Hennessy's first full length play Colostrum, set on a West Midlands farm, was a finalist for the inaugural Women's Prize for Playwriting. Hennessy was selected for the 2023 BBC Writers Pilot programme.

In 2022, Hennessy was approached by director Lisa Spirling to adapt the Wagatha Christie defamation case for the stage. Regarding the story, Hennessy told BBC News, "This case couldn't have happened 10 years ago, and it probably won't happen in 10 years, because media law is catching up with how we operate on social media every day". Marking Hennessy's West End, Vardy v Rooney: The Wagatha Christie Trial premiered at the Wyndham's Theatre in November 2022 before having a run at the Ambassadors Theatre and a tour in 2023. The production starred Lucy May Barker and Laura Dos Santos. Vardy v Rooney: The Wagatha Christie Trial was nominated for the Laurence Olivier Award for Best Entertainment or Comedy Play.

At the end of 2024, Hennessy returned to Pentabus when she won the 2025 Jerwood Foundation Writer in Residence bursary.
