= Orla O'Loughlin =

British theatre director

- Born: London, UK
- Education: National Theatre; National Theatre Studio; Warwick University; Central School of Speech and Drama; University of Reading
- Occupation: Theatre director

Orla O'Loughlin is a British theatre director. In 2018, she became the vice principal and director of drama at Guildhall School of Music & Drama.

== Education ==
O'Loughlin trained at the National Theatre and National Theatre Studio. She has a B.A (Hons) in theatre and performance from Warwick University, an M.A (Dist) in advanced theatre practice from Central School of Speech and Drama and a PGCE in drama from the University of Reading.

== Career ==
O'Loughlin was artistic director of Pentabus Theatre from 2006 to 2012 and the international associate at The Royal Court.

From 2012 to 2018, O'Loughlin was the artistic director of the Traverse Theatre, Edinburgh. In her final year as theatre director, she won ten nominations in the Critics' Awards for Theatre in Scotland across six categories.

O'Loughlin has been the vice principal and director of drama at Guildhall School of Music & Drama since 2019. Alongside this role, she also works as a freelance theatre director.

The Observer listed O'Loughlin as one of the top 50 cultural leaders in the U.K and she was included in The List Hot 100 of Women in the Arts. She is a regular subject for print and digital media and has appeared on BBC Radio 4’s Woman’s Hour, The Today Programme and was the subject of the BBC Radio Documentary Stark Talk covering her life and work. O'Loughlin continues to deliver masterclasses and workshops across the world and has sat on a range of award panels including: James Tait Black Award for Drama, Windham Campbell and the Linbury Prize.

== Directing credits ==
Year	Production	Company/venue
2007	Kebab	Dublin International Festival, Royal Court Theatre
2007	The Hound of the Baskerville	West Yorkshire Playhouse, national tour, West End
2011	Relatively Speaking, Blithe Spirit, Black Comedy	Watermill Theatre
2011	For Once	Hampstead Theatre, national tour
2012	How Much is your Iron?	Young Vic
2014	Clean and A Respectable Widow takes to Vulgarity	Traverse Theatre, Oran Mor, Theatre 59E59, NYC
2014	Spoiling	Traverse Theatre, Theatre Royal Stratford East
2015	Swallow	Traverse Theatre
2016	Milk	Traverse Theatre
2016	Grain in the Blood	Traverse Theatre
2017	Meet Me at Dawn	Traverse Theatre
2017	Locker Room Talk	Traverse Theatre, Latitude Festival, Abbey Theatre, Scottish Parliament, tour
2018	What Girls Are Made Of	Traverse Theatre, Tramway, international tour
2018	Mouthpiece	Traverse Theatre, Soho Theatre
2018	The Artist Man and the Mother Woman	Traverse Theatre
2023	The Time Machine	National tour
2024	Enough of Him	Not presented
2025	A Play, a Pint and a Pie	Traverse Theatre
2025	Wallace	Traverse
2026	Ciara	Traverse Theatre, Citizens Theatre
	Origins	Pleasance, Theatre Severn, national tour
	Small Talk: Big Picture	Royal Court Theatre, ICA, BBC World Service
	Shuffle	Merry Hill Shopping Centre
	Underland	Clearwell Caves
	A Dulditch Angel	National tour
	The Fire Raisers	BAC

== Awards ==
Her work has received Fringe Firsts, including Swallow in 2015, Herald Angels and Critics Awards for Theatre in Scotland and she is previous winner of the James Menzies Kitchin Directors Award and recipient of the Carlton Bursary at the Donmar Warehouse.
