= Pedal Pusher =

Play

- Original language: English
- Written by: Roland Smith
- Characters: Lance Armstrong, Jan Ullrich, Marco Pantani
- Subject: A Story of the Tour de France
- Genre: Sport, drama, biography
- Setting: a hotel room, road races

Premiere
- Date: July 2009
- Place: Cavendish Gate; London

Pedal Pusher is a play written by the English director and playwright, Roland Smith. Pedal Pusher revolves around the Tour de France in the late 1990s and early 2000s. It was developed from dialogue gleaned from interviews, biographies and archive footage. It premiered at London's Cavendish Gate Theatre in July 2009, starring Tom Daplyn, Josh Cass, Alexander Guiney and Graham O'Mara, directed by Roland Smith and produced by Theatre Delicatessen.

== Plot ==
Pedal Pusher begins with Marco Pantani lying dead in a hotel room. The play goes on to describe a detailed account of the great rivalry, and achievements, of the three cycling legends – Armstrong, Ullrich and Pantani – and each of their individual struggles – Pantani's horrific 1995 crash and struggle with drugs, Ullrich's depression and subsequent drug allegations and Armstrong's fight against cancer.
