= Theatre Souk =

Theatrical model

Theatre Souk is an experimental theatrical model first developed in 2010 by the London-based theatre company Theatre Delicatessen. It was conceived and curated by Jessica Brewster, and co-produced by Roland Smith. Theatre Souk is related to promenade theatre, immersive theatre or site-specific theatre, in which each audience member is required to devise his or her own route through the performance and thus has a unique theatrical experience. The model of Theatre Souk was designed to be reiterated in different locations with different participants. The Theatre Souk model is that of a performance marketplace where emerging theatre companies to showcase their more experimental work, in an immersive theatrical environment governed by the principles of exchange and barter. The “pop-up” theatre project was developed in the period following the economic downturn, which led to the increased availability of commercial buildings kept empty by delayed building projects. In response to these economic conditions, and the cuts in arts funding that resulted from them, Theatre Souk was devised as a theatrical experience structured around barter and persuasion, highlighting the negotiation of use value and exchange value that is inherent in the production, dissemination, and consumption of art. The first Theatre Souk opened as a pop-up theatre event in a derelict building at 3-4 Picton Place, the former offices of Uzbekistan Airways, in the West End of London, and ran from September 14 to October 16, 2010. Theatre Delicatessen invited sixteen other theatre companies (comprising over sixty artists and performers) to create theatre performances and installations in different parts of the building. Each performance centered on the theme of money. Audience members paid £7 to enter the building and were then required to negotiate with performers to determine the fee for each individual performance. The ground floor bar, where a series of cabaret acts played throughout, adopted the aesthetics of a trading floor, with a large blackboard listing different floors, rooms, and performances. Further intervention into the audience’s decision-making process was provided by roaming, improvising performers who interact directly with the audience members in corridor and other intermediate spaces, offering advice and suggestions on ways to move through the souk and encouraging audience to get the best deal.

== Theatre Souk 2010 Productions ==
.dash: Chaika Casino
The Lab Collective: Matador / The Bull Pen
Barometric
Curving Road: a scene from Laura Wade’s 2005 hotel thriller Breathing Corpses
FoxedUP: Priceless (Underground)
HalfCut
Juliane Von Sivers: Uzbekistan Airways by Tom Ellen
Keiko Sumida
Natural Shocks: Between Life and Nowhere orThe Stairwell
Flabbergast Theatre: The Puppet Poker Pit
Straight out of Line: Soft Armour
