= Milli Bhatia =

English theatre director

- Born: Chameli Sushila Bhatia; 1992 or 1993 (age 33–34)
- Education: University of East Anglia; Birkbeck, University of London
- Years active: 2015–present
- Mother: Meera Syal
- Family: Sanjeev Bhaskar (step-father)
- Website: www.millibhatia.com

Chameli Sushila Bhatia (born 1992 or 1993) is an English theatre director and dramaturg. Her work at the Royal Court Theatre was twice nominated for an affiliate Laurence Olivier Award. She was also nominated for a 2024 Offie.

== Early life ==
Bhatia is the daughter of Meera Syal and Shekhar Bhatia. She is of Punjabi descent. Her parents divorced in 2002, and she was subsequently brought up in Broadwalk, South Woodford by her mother and stepfather Sanjeev Bhaskar alongside her half-brother (born 2005).

Bhatia attended Forest School, Walthamstow, completing her A Levels in 2010. She also joined the National Youth Theatre (NYT). She graduated with a Bachelor of Arts (BA) in Drama and Theatre Arts from the University of East Anglia (UEA) in 2014 and a Master of Fine Arts (MFA) in Theatre Directing from Birkbeck, University of London in 2016.

== Career ==
In 2015, Bhatia joined the Birmingham Repertory Theatre as a Resident Assistant Director. After completing her MFA, she moved to the Bush Theatre, directing Hijabi Monologues (2017). She also curated the monologue anthology My White Best Friend (And Other Letters Left Unsaid) at The Bunker with Rachel De-lahay.

After a stint as a trainee director in 2018, Bhatia worked at the Royal Court Theatre from 2019 to 2023 as a Literary Associate. For the Royal Court, she directed Jasmine Lee-Jones's seven methods of killing kylie jenner (2019), Jasmine Naziha Jones' Baghdaddy (2022), and Mohamed Zain Dada's Blue Mist (2023). seven methods of killing kylie Jenner and Blue Mist were both nominated for the Laurence Olivier Award for Outstanding Achievement in an Affiliate Theatre in 2020 and 2024 respectively. Blue Mist also won Best Stage Production at the Asian Media Awards. In addition, Bhatia co-created the immersive Dismantle This Room (2019) with Nina Segal, co-directed Lucy Kirkwood's Maryland (2021) with Lucy Morrison and Vicky Featherstone and contributed to Edition 1 of the collection Living Newspaper (2021) with Temi Wilkey among others.

At the Theatre Royal Stratford East, Bhatia collaborated with Travis Alabanza on I'm tired of waiting, someone pass me the duct tape (2022), an installment of Burn It Down. Bhatia started collaborating with Sonali Bhattacharyya, directing Chasing Hares (2022) at the Young Vic, Liberation Squares (2024) for Brixton House and Nottingham Playhouse and King Troll (The Fawn) (2024) at the New Diorama Theatre. For her work on Liberation Squares, Bhatia was nominated for the 2024 Offie for Director (Plays). She also returned to the Bush Theatre and reunited with Mohamed Zain Dada, directing for his play Speed (2025).

== Personal life ==
In 2011, Bhatia was cleared of deliberately shattering a classmate's glass after it was accepted as an accident and that she had merely flicked the glass.
