= Gargi Bhattacharyya =

British sociologist (born 1968)

- Born: 1968 (age 57–58)
- Occupation: Sociologist
- Employer: University College London
- Title: Professor
- Family: Sonali Bhattacharyya (sister)

Gargi Bhattacharyya (born 1968) is a British sociologist. They are Professor and Director of the Sarah Parker Remond Centre for the Study of Racism and Racialisation (SPRC) at University College London (UCL).

== Life ==
Bhattacharyya was born to Bengali parents and grew up in Leicester. Their younger sister is the playwright Sonali Bhattacharyya. They were a lecturer at Aston University, and University of Birmingham.They were formerly Professor of Sociology at the University of East London (UEL), before coming to University College London (UCL) in 2024.

Bhattacharyya was the Chair of the University and College Union (UCU) at UEL, and on UCU's black members standing committee. In November 2020, they found themself among several UEL academics threatened with redundancy. The MP Zarah Sultana expressed concern, particularly at the possibility that Bhattacharyya might have been targeted as a trade union organiser at UEL.

Mike Savage has called them "one of the leading academics on race", responsible for writing "what is probably the most important book on racial capitalism".

== Works ==
- Tales of Dark-skinned Women: race, gender and global culture. London: UCL Press, 1998.
- Race and Power. London: Routledge, 2001
- Sexuality and Society; an introduction. London: Routledge, 2002.
- Traffick; the illicit movement of people and things. London: Pluto, 2005.
- Dangerous Brown Men : exploiting sex, violence and feminism in the war on terror. London: Zed Books, 2008.
- (ed.) Ethnicities and Values in a Changing World. Farnham: Ashgate, 2009.
- Crisis, Austerity and Everyday Life: Living in a time of diminishing expectations. Palgrave Macmillan, 2015.
- Go Home? The Politics of Immigration controversies. Jones, H, Gunaratnam, Y, Bhattacharyya, G, Davies, W, Dhaliwal, S, Forkert, F, Jackson, E and Saltus, R. Manchester: Manchester University Press, 2017.
- Rethinking Racial Capitalism: questions of reproduction and survival. London: Rowman and Littlefield, 2018.
- How Media and Conflicts Make Migrants. Kirsten Forkert, Federico Oliveri, Gargi Bhattacharyya and Janna Graham. Manchester: MUP, 2020.
- Empire's Endgame: Racism and the British State, with Adam Elliott-Cooper, Sita Balani, Kerem Nisancioglu, Kojo Koram, Dalia Gebrial, Nadine El-Enany, Luke De Noronha. London: Pluto Press, 2021.
- We, The Heartbroken. London: Hajar Press, 2023.
- The Futures of Racial Capitalism. Newark: Polity Press, 2024
