= Daylight Robbery (2008 film) =

- Poster
- Directed by: Paris Leonti
- Written by: Paris Leonti
- Produced by: Nick O'Hagan
- Starring: Paul Nicholls; Shaun Parkes; Geoff Bell
- Cinematography: Milton Kam
- Edited by: Hasse Billing
- Music by: Richard Chester
- Production companies: Daylight Productions; Giant Films
- Distributed by: Daylight Productions
- Release date: 29 August 2008
- Running time: 99 minutes
- Country: United Kingdom
- Language: English

Daylight Robbery is a 2008 British crime film, directed by Paris Leonti and starring Paul Nicholls and Geoff Bell.

== Plot ==
Alex masterminds an ambitious plan to steal millions of pounds in untraceable, used banknotes which are stacked in the underground vaults of the London Exchange Bank, where they await incineration. Lucky, Matty, Terry, Chubby, Norman and Jay make up his unlikely gang of robbers. They initially set up an alibi, by checking in for a flight to join thousands of England supporters in a mass exodus to the 2006 FIFA World Cup in Germany. Then, instead of passing through to the departure lounge, the gang head out to the car park, pile into a van and drive to Central London, where they ram the doors of the London Exchange Bank, blocking any exit for those caught up inside.

The plan involves escaping through the tunnel they have already dug under the bank to funnel out the cash, within a couple of hours, to allow time to catch their flight to Germany. As part of the plan, they have posted an accomplice among the hostages; he will later patch up their exit point from the bank and himself escape among the freed hostages, after the police move in.

The plan starts to unravel as soon as they break in: Chubby sustains a serious leg injury on being thrown through the back window of the van while Norman is reversing the van through the bank's front doors. Chubby passes out soon thereafter from blood loss, forcing the gang to communicate with the police camped outside and to allow a doctor into the crime scene, to attend to the injured man.

Things go smoothly elsewhere, however, and they are able to escape with the bags of cash, through the tunnel. However, at the very end, Norman, the last man out, is trapped in the tunnel when a portion in the middle collapses. Alex sends everyone else off to the airport and frantically digs Norman out and brings him to the airport in a cab, where he catches his flight at the very last moment.

At the end of the film it is revealed that Chubby never recovered from his leg wound and died when the plane landed in Germany. This allowed police to link evidence from the crime scene with Matty's identity and, working backwards, to work out the gang's original plan. However, Alex, who did not travel to Germany, was never caught and has since disappeared with the money. He is shown to be supporting the rest of the gang through their prison terms, as well as Chubby's widow.

== Cast ==
- Geoff Bell as Alex
- Shaun Parkes as Yardie
- Paul Nicholls as Chubby
- Vas Blackwood as Lucky
- Johnny Harris as Terry
- Leo Gregory as Matty
- Justin Salinger as Norman
- Max Brown as The doctor
- Shaun Williamson as The Police Chief

== Reception ==
Review aggregator Rotten Tomatoes currently reports a 22% average approval rating from all critics. Professional critical opinion has been primarily negative. The site's critical consensus reads, "This poorly executed brit crime caper wants to be a Guy Ritchie film, but ends up more like an extended Eastenders episode."

Josh Winning of Total Film called it a "confident first picture from writer/director Paris Leonti, Robbery sidesteps Ocean's-style gloss but keeps the tension ticking along." Giving it 3 out of 5 stars. Derek Malcolm of the Evening Standard gave the same rating, saying that for a small budget film, it was "made with complete professionalism" despite its unoriginal plot.

Most reviewers were less than favourable, but many who gave negative ratings admitted that it was an impressive attempt for the director's debut feature film, yet did not excuse the mistakes made. Tim Robey from the Daily Telegraph gave 1 star out of 5, denouncing it as a "Dog's Dinner" of a film. Edward Porter from The Times also gave 1 star but admitted "You can't accuse Paris Leonti of lacking ambition: for his first film as a writer/director, he has attempted a British answer to 'Inside Man'. In all other respects, though, his work doesn't measure up." Similarly, Cath Clarke from the Guardian compared it to an "[East]Enders special"
