= Pentabus =

English theatrical company

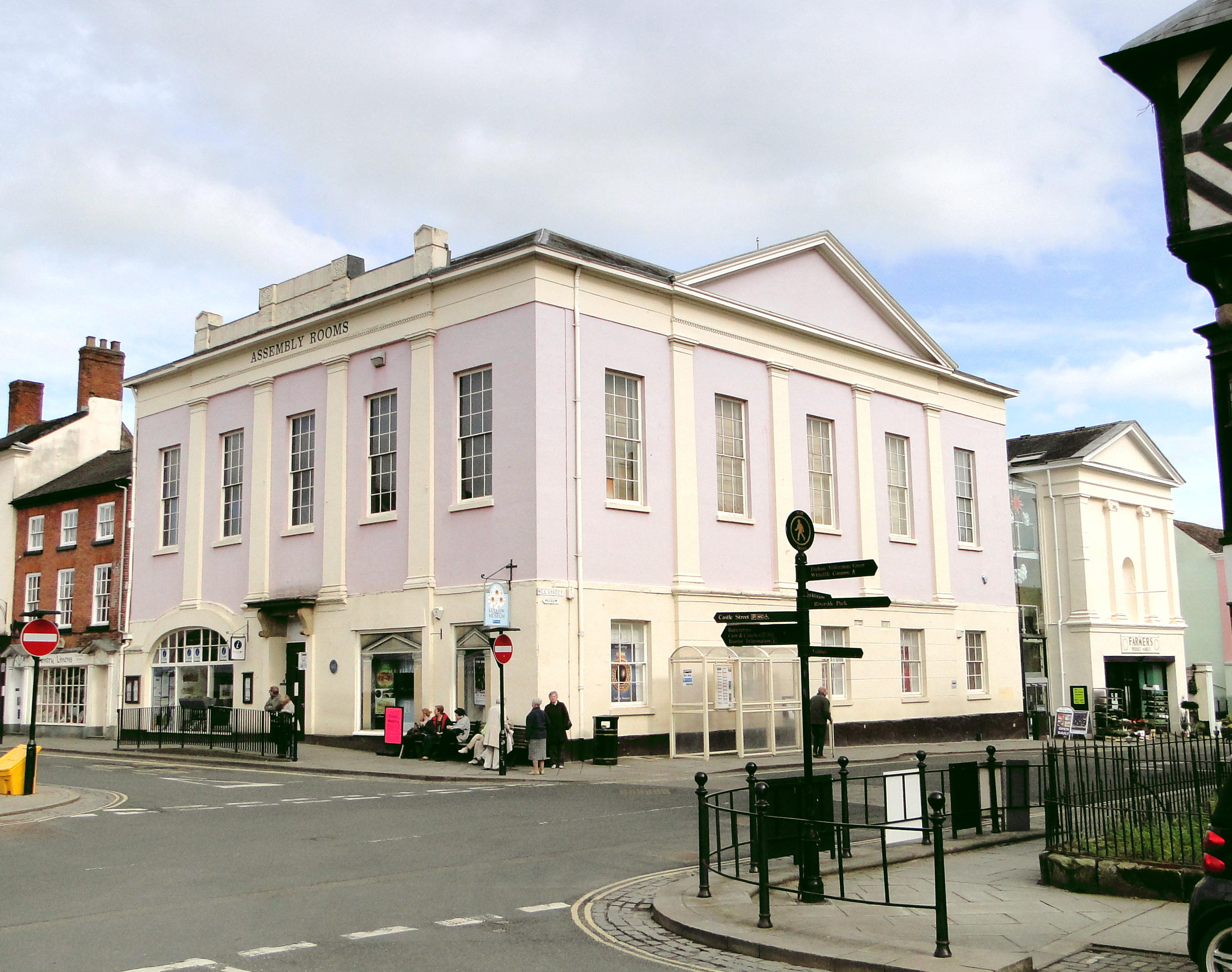
Ludlow Assembly Rooms

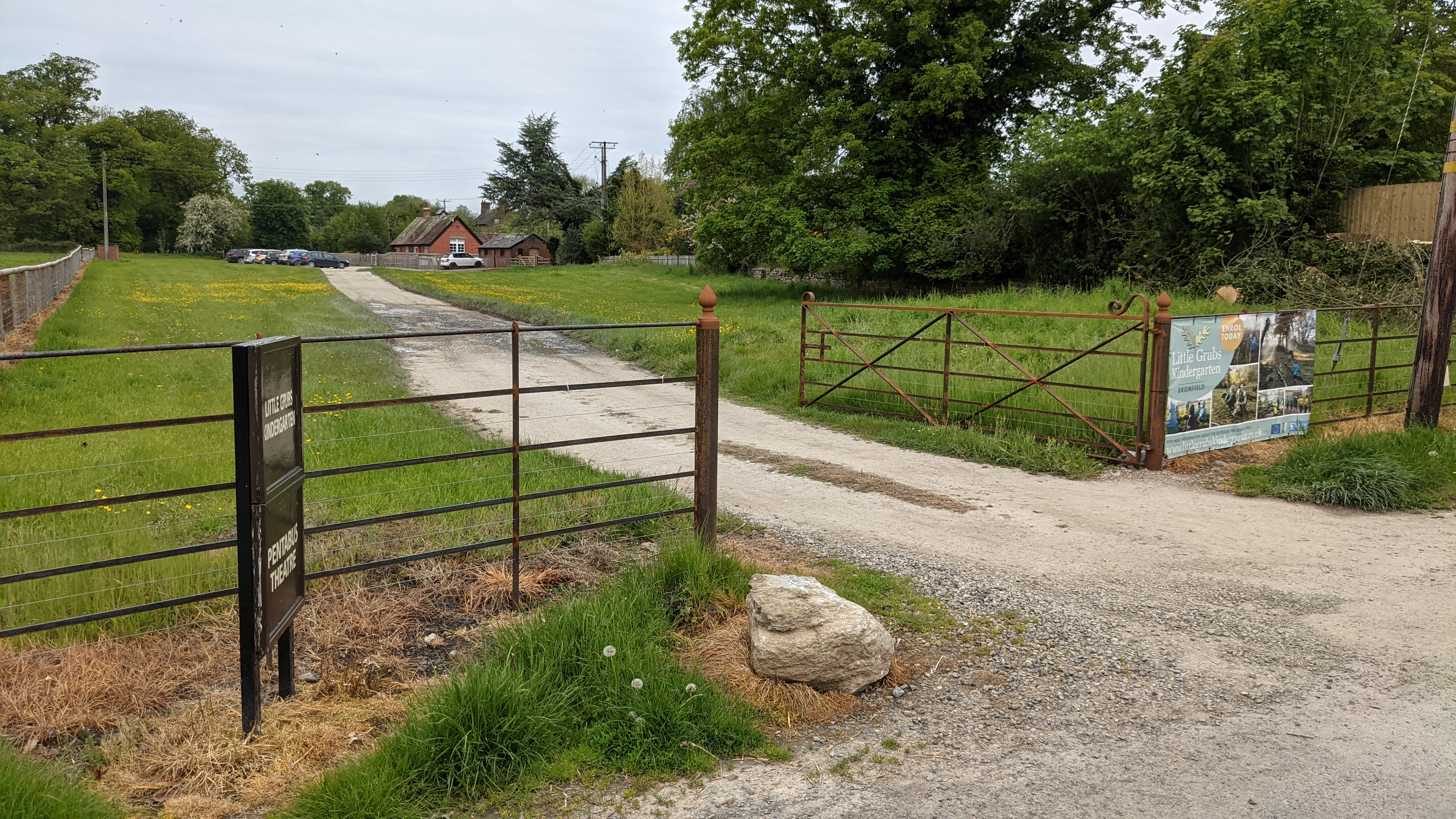
Bromfield location until 2024

Pentabus is a rural theatre and new writing company founded in Kidderminster by Sue Dunderdale in 1974. It is currently based in Ludlow, Shropshire, having moved from its previous headquarters Bromfield in 2024.

Elle While has been director since 2021. As of 2025, Pentabus has reportedly developed over 300 plays.

== History ==
In 1973, West Midlands Art set out to address the lack of arts and subsidies for the arts in the West Midlands outside of the cities, with theatre maker Sue Dunderdale leading the effort. The following year, the Pentabus Experiment or Pentabus Project was officially founded. It was to be a touring theatre company, aiming to bring "high quality theatre" to rural areas of the five counties of West Midlands. "Pent" referred to the five counties – Herefordshire, Shropshire, Staffordshire, Warwickshire and Worcestershire – while "bus" referred to the old bus the company traveled in. Pentabus was first based in Kidderminster and then Areley Kings.

Due to its small size, Pentabus reigned in its focus in 1976 to adjust Shropshire, Herefordshire and Worcestershire. Jonathan Cross took over as director from Dunderdale around this time. After being offered in 1983, the company's headquarters officially moved into a disused school building in Bromfield, Shropshire in 1989. A community arts programme was also launched in Weobly and Leominster and broke off in 1992. Peter Cann served as director at this time.

Elizabeth Freestone was appointed artistic director in 2012. Sophie Motley took over from Freestone in 2017, followed by Elle While from Motley in 2021.

In 2014, Pentabus started hosting early career playwrights at an old country house in a scheme called the Writer in Residence bursary. Simon Longman was the inaugural Writer in Residence, through which he pitched and developed his debut play Milked. It was initially supported by Channel 4 before switching to the Clive Richards Foundation in 2018. As of 2024, the Writer in Residence bursary is supported by the Jerwood Foundation.

Amid the 50th anniversary of the company in 2024, Pentabus moved its headquarters from Bromfield to a new premises at the Ludlow Assembly Rooms. The following year, a youth theatre was established. In 2025, Marianne Elliott joined the board of Pentabus alongside the likes of Michelle Terry and Emma Dennis-Edwards.

== Personnel ==
=== Artistic directors ===
- 1974–1976: Sue Dunderdale
- 1976–1985: Jonathan Cross
- 1985–1989: Peter Cann
- 1992–1998: Steve Johnstone and Purvin
- 1998–2006: Theresa Heskins
- 2006–2012: Orla O'Loughlin
- 2012–2017: Elizabeth Freestone
- 2017–2021: Sophie Morley
- 2021–present: Elle While

=== Writer in Residence ===
- 2014: Simon Longman
- 2015: Joe White
- 2016: Tim Foley
- 2018–2019: Sophie Ellerby
- 2020: Tom Powell
- 2021–2022: Florence Espeut-Nickless
- 2023: Laura Waldren, Henry Maddicott
- 2025: Liv Hennessy
- 2025: Sid Sagar
- 2026: Rhys Warrington

Previous Writers in Residence Sophie Ellerby and Tom Powell returned to Pentabus in 2025 as Associate Artists, as did Liv Hennessy. Other Associate Artists have included Katie Elin-Salt, Naeem Hayat and Anoushka Warden.
