= Manfred Karge =

German actor (born 1938)

Manfred Karge (born March 1, 1938, in Brandenburg an der Havel) is a German dramatist. He is best known among English-speaking audiences for the staging of Brecht's "Mann ist Mann" (1926) as Man to Man.

From 1958 to 1961 he studied at the Berlin State Drama School in what was then East Germany. He was in Berlin at the time of the building of the Berlin Wall.

His 1986 play "The Conquest of the South Pole" was first shown in Britain in 1988 with Alan Cumming in the lead role at the Traverse Theatre in Edinburgh. This was then made into a film set in Leith (the harbour area of Edinburgh) in 1989 starring Ewen Bremner and John Michie.
