= Thames Reach =

Homelessness charity in London

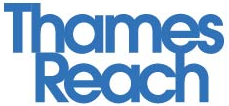
Thames Reach logo

Thames Reach is a London-based charity working with people who have experienced homelessness or who are at risk of homelessness.

== Services ==
The services provided by Thames Reach are structured around four main areas: prevention, accommodation and outreach, support, and influencing policy and practice.

=== Prevention ===
Thames Reach prioritises early intervention to stop homelessness before it happens. Its prevention work focuses on helping individuals at risk to remain securely housed.

- Tenancy sustainment services for people at risk of eviction.
- Advice and signposting for those navigating housing, immigration, or health systems.
- Advocacy for improved prevention duties across statutory services such as housing, health, and criminal justice.

=== Accommodation and Outreach ===
The organisation provides a range of housing options and runs outreach services across London to help people move off the streets and into stable accommodation.

- Year-round street outreach teams operating across multiple London boroughs.
- Assessment centres to determine the most appropriate next steps for people leaving the streets.
- High-support accommodation for those with complex needs.
- Access to longer-term housing aimed at helping individuals regain independence.

=== Support ===
Thames Reach offers a broad range of support services to help people move on from homelessness and build stable, independent lives.

- Health outreach and access to preventative care.
- Training and employment programmes to support long-term recovery.
- Casework and coordination of services for people with complex or multiple needs.

=== Influencing ===
Alongside delivering frontline services, Thames Reach seeks to influence how homelessness is addressed at policy and commissioning levels.

- Uses evidence from its own work to inform and improve service design.
- Advocates for systemic change in how support is funded and delivered.
- Shares models of effective practice to influence broader sector improvement.

== History and size ==
Thames Reach was founded in 1984. The organisation helped over 15,000 people across London over the course of 2023-24, working across every London borough.

== See also ==
- Homelessness in the United Kingdom
- Rough sleeper
