= Alexandra Wood (dramatist) =

British dramatist

- Born: 1982 (age 43–44)
- Occupation: Playwright

Alexandra Wood (born 1982) is a British dramatist. She won the 2007 George Devine Award.

== Plays ==
- The Human Ear (Paines Plough)
- Ages (Old Vic New Voices)
- English version of German dramatist Manfred Karge's version of Brecht's Man to Man (Wales Millennium Centre)
- Merit (Theatre Royal, Plymouth) 2015
- The Initiate (Paines Plough), winner of Scotsman Fringe First Award 2014, restaged Southbank Centre 2015
- adaptation of Jung Chang's Wild Swans (ART/Young Vic)
- The Empty Quarter (Hampstead Theatre)
- The Centre (Islington Community Theatre)
- Decade (co-writer, Headlong)
- Unbroken (Gate)
- The Lion's Mouth (Royal Court Rough Cuts)
- The Eleventh Capital (Royal Court) 2007
- Twelve Years (BBC Radio 4).
