= Isley Lynn =

American-British playwright

Isley Alana Lynn is an American-born, London-based playwright. Their work includes co-authorship with Libby Rodliffe of the 2024 play Jobsworth.

Lynn graduated from the University of Exeter with a Bachelor of Arts (BA).

== Honours and recognition ==
- 2025: Winner: 'Imison Award' at BBC Audio Drama Awards - Tether (BBC Radio 4)
- 2024: Nominated: 'Outstanding Achievement In An Affiliate Theatre' at the Olivier Awards - The Swell (Orange Tree Theatre)
- 2023: Nominated for Offie for 'Best New Play' - The Swell (Orange Tree Theatre)
- 2023: Winner: 'Charles Wintour Most Promising Playwright Award' at the Evening Standard Theatre Awards - The Swell (Orange Tree Theatre)'
- 2021: Finalist: 'Women's Prize for Playwriting' - Furies
- 2017: Finalist: 'Most Promising New Playwright' at The Offies - Skin A Cat (Bunker Theatre)
- 2016: Winner: 'Pick Of The Year' at The Vault Festival Awards - Skin A Cat (Vault Festival)
- 2014: Winner: 'Script6' at The Space - Bright Nights
- 2012: Special Commendation: Soho Theatre 'Young Writers Award' - Lomography

== Bibliography ==
- Isley Lynn Plays 1. Bloomsbury Publishing, Methuen Drama. 2024. ISBN 9781350504523
- Jobsworth. Bloomsbury Publishing, Methuen Drama. 2024. ISBN 9781350530331
- The Swell. Bloomsbury Publishing, Methuen Drama. 2023. ISBN 9781350438842
- Staging Violence Against Women and Girls. Bloomsbury Publishing, Methuen Drama. 2023. ISBN 9781350329706
- Albatross. Bloomsbury Publishing, Methuen Drama. 2022. ISBN 9781350304321
- War Of The Worlds. Bloomsbury Publishing, Methuen Drama. 2021. ISBN 9781350269934
- 15 Heroines: 15 Monologues Adapted from Ovid. Nick Hern Books. 2020. ISBN 9781848429864
- Skin A Cat. Bloomsbury Publishing, Oberon Books. 2016. ISBN 9781786820525
