= Paines Plough =

British touring theatre company

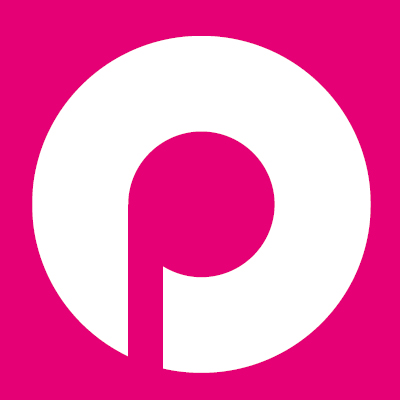
Paines Plough's logo.

Paines Plough is an English touring theatre company founded in 1974, currently led by artistic directors Charlotte Bennett and Katie Posner.

The company commissions, develops and produces new plays for touring, and helps playwrights develop their craft. Since its foundation, it has commissioned the early works of hundreds of writers, including James Graham, Sarah Kane, Dennis Kelly, Miriam Battye, Nick Payne, Abi Morgan, Duncan Macmillan, Mike Bartlett, Anna Jordan, Sam Steiner, Vinay Patel, Zia Ahmed and Kae Tempest.

Over the past five decades, Paines Plough has produced work by a wide range of playwrights across the UK and abroad. Collaboration with other theatre organisations is a feature of the company’s work; since 2010 the company has co-produced every show it has worked on with either a venue or a touring partner.

== History ==
Paines Plough was formed over a pint of Paines bitter in the Plough pub in Bolnhurst, Bedford, by writer David Pownall, director John Adams, with the actor Chris Crooks. Their first play Crates on Barrels, written by Pownall for Crooks to perform, opened at the Edinburgh Festival Fringe in August 1975. In 1976, the company achieved further success with Pownall’s play, Music to Murder By, leading to a Fringe First and Arts Council funding.

In 2019, the joint artistic directors Katie Posner and Charlotte Bennett were approached by producer Ellie Keel to co-found an award for female and non-binary playwrights. They launched the Women's Prize for Playwriting together at the end of that year and have continued their support for the prize since then, co-producing the 2021 winners Reasons You Should(n't) Love Me by Amy Trigg and You Bury Me by Ahlam, and the 2022 winner Consumed by Karis Kelly which will tour in 2025.

== Artistic directors ==
Artistic director(s)	Years active
John Adams	1974–1982
John Chapman	1982–1985
Pip Broughton	1985–1990
Anna Furse	1990–1994
Penny Ciniewicz	1994–1997
Vicky Featherstone	1997–2005
Roxana Silbert	2005–2010
James Grieve George Perrin	2010–2019
Katie Posner Charlotte Bennett	2019–present

== Roundabout ==
Roundabout is Paines Plough's touring in-the-round auditorium. Roundabout was designed by Lucy Osborne and Emma Chapman in collaboration with Charcoalblue and Howard Eaton. It was built and developed by Factory Settings.

In 2010, Roundabout was commissioned, with a prototype built in 2011 with Sheffield Theatres. The opening season of Roundabout consisted of three new plays performed in repertory One Day When We Were Young by Nick Payne, Lungs by Duncan Macmillan and The Sound of Heavy Rain by Penelope Skinner.

In 2014, Roundabout was re-imagined to allow for touring. As part of Paines Plough's 40th anniversary celebrations a new season was commissioned for Roundabout. The plays debuted at Edinburgh Festival Fringe at Summerhall: Our Teacher's A Troll by Dennis Kelly, The Initiate by Alexandra Wood and Lungs and Every Brilliant Thing by Duncan Macmillan. After the run in Edinburgh, Roundabout toured nationally to: Corn Exchange, Margate Theatre Royal, Hackney Showroom and The Civic in Barnsley.

Roundabout won the Theatre Building of the Year award at The Stage Awards in 2015.

== Notable productions ==
- Crates on Barrels by David Pownall
- Music to Murder By by David Pownall
- Songs for Stray Cats and Other Living Creatures by Donna Franceschild
- The Clink by Stephen Jeffreys
- Crave by Sarah Kane
- Splendour by Abi Morgan
- Orphans by Dennis Kelly
- After the End by Dennis Kelly
- Mercury Fur by Philip Ridley
- Wasted by Kae Tempest
- Every Brilliant Thing by Duncan Macmillan with Jonny Donahoe
- Lungs by Duncan Macmillan
- The Angry Brigade by James Graham
- Love Love Love by Mike Bartlett
- One Day When We Were Young by Nick Payne
- Sticks and Stones by Vinay Patel
- You Stupid Darkess! by Sam Steiner
- Pop Music by Anna Jordan
- Run Sister Run by Chloe Moss
- I Wanna Be Yours by Zia Ahmed
- Dexter & Winter's Detective Agency by Nathan Bryon
- Hungry by Chris Bush
- Reasons You Should(n't) Love Me by Amy Trigg
- You Bury Me by Ahlam
- Strategic Love Play by Miriam Battye
- Bullring Techno Makeout Jamz by Nathan Queeley-Dennis
- My Mother's Funeral: The Show by Kelly Jones
