= Sarah Grochala =

British playwright (born 1973)

Sarah Grochala (born 9 January 1973) is a British playwright. Her plays have been performed at the Finborough Theatre, Theatre503, Hampstead Theatre, Arcola Theatre and Soho Theatre in London. Her plays have been produced internationally by the Griffin Theatre, Sydney, Tiyatro Yan Etki Istanbul, Turkey and on the Toronto Fringe Toronto Fringe Festival, Canada. Her book on playwriting, The Contemporary Political Play, was published in 2017.

== Early life and education ==
Grochala was born in Hemel Hempstead and grew up in Nantwich, Cheshire. She trained as an actress at the Drama Centre in London, and studied English Language and Literature at St John's College, Oxford University.

== Career ==
Between 1998 and 2006, Grochala worked as actress in theatre and television. She appeared in the television drama Every Woman Knows a Secret and the TV series Judge John Deed. She also starred as Jo March in the 2004/2005 West End production of Little Women.

She studied playwriting on the MPhil in Playwriting Studies at Birmingham University, a course created by the British playwright David Edgar. She later gained a PhD in contemporary British playwriting from Queen Mary, University of London.

Her early plays Open Ground (2005) and Waiting for Romeo (2006) were produced on the fringe in London and Edinburgh. Waiting for Romeo was revived by Tiyatro Yan Etki in Istanbul in 2014 and ran in rep at the theatre until 2016. The production won the 2015 Ekin Yazin Dostları Theatre Award for Best Play (Small Venue).

Her breakthrough play S-27 won the 2007 Protect the Human Playwriting Competition and was also shortlisted for the 2007 King's Cross Award and the 2010 Leah Ryan Award for Emerging Women Writers. S-27 premiered at the Finborough Theatre in June 2009. It has since been revived internationally by the Griffin Theatre in Sydney in 2010, starring Sarah Snook and by Intersection Theatre on the Toronto Fringe in 2012.

Grochala received the 2011 Offie for Adopt a Playwright Award for her play Smolensk. Her most recent play Star Fish was shortlisted for the 2016 Nick Darke Award.

From 2012 to 2016, she was an associate artist with the theatre company Headlong, where she worked on creating theatrical experiences using digital media. These included: The Nether Realm (Royal Court 2014) made in collaboration with the visual artist Michael Takeo Magruder, the director Jeremy Herrin and the playwright Jennifer Haley; and What's She Like made in collaboration with the interactive theatre company Coney.

In 2019, she wrote for Doctor Who, contributing to the Big Finish spin-off, The Eighth of March. She would write for further releases, including The Robots, The First Doctor Adventures and Lady Christina.

== Personal life ==
Grochala lives in London. She was course leader for the MA & MFA in Writing for Stage and Broadcast Media Programme at Royal Central School of Speech and Drama until 2025.

== Publications ==
=== Plays ===
- Open Ground (Teatro Technis, London 2005)
- Waiting for Romeo (Hill Street Theatre, Edinburgh 2006)
- Gift (Kings Head, London 2008)
- Viable Alternatives (Green Man Festival, Wales 2008)
- Remains (Theatre503, London 2009)
- S-27 (Finborough Theatre, London 2009)
- The Return (Birmingham University, 2010)
- Standing Out of the Light (Theatre503, London 2010)
- Skin (Arcola, London 2010)
- The Beautiful Ones (Latitude Festival, England 2011)
- Red Shoes (Chapter Arts, Cardiff; Theatre503, London; Arches, Glasgow 2012)
- Emperor's New Clothes (Cockpit Theatre, London 2012)
- The Shadow (Soho Theatre, London 2014)
- Little Mermaid (Wales Millennium Centre, Cardiff 2014)
- Alexandria n. (Primrose Hill Community Library, London 2015)
- Intelligence

=== Big Finish ===
==== The Eighth of March ====
- Narcissus (2018)

==== The Robots ====
- Do No Harm (Series 2, 2020)
- Off Grid (Series 4, 2021)

==== The First Doctor Adventures ====
- The Hollow Crown (Volume 5, 2021)

==== Lady Christina ====
- Outback (Series 2, 2021)

==== The Avengers: The Comic Strip Adaptations ====
- Mother’s Day (Volume 05: Steed & Tara King, 2021)
- Stand and Deliver (Volume 06: Steed & Mrs Peel, 2022)

==== The Fifth Doctor Adventures ====
- God of War (Forty: Volume 01, 2022)
- Resistor (In the Night, 2023)

==== The Ninth Doctor Adventures ====
- The False Dimitry (Back to Earth, 2022)

==== Star Cops ====
- Death in the Desert (Series 3A; The High Frontier, 2022)

==== UNIT ====
- Traitors’ Gate (UNIT: Nemesis 4: Masters of Time, 2023)

==== The Fourth Doctor Adventures ====
- The Face in the Storm (Series 13, 2024)

=== Books ===
- The Contemporary Political Play (Methuen Drama 2017)
- The Theatre of Rupert Goold (Methuen Drama 2020)

=== Digital ===
- 1984 Digital Double (Headlong/Cultural Institute at King's 2013)
- PRISM (Headlong/Cultural Institute at King's 2014)
- The Nether Realm (Headlong/Royal Court 2014)
- What's She Like (Headlong/Coney 2016)

== Awards ==
- The Women’s Prize for Playwriting (2023) for Intelligence
