= Drum Theatre, Plymouth =

Theatre in Devon, England

Coordinates: 50.3699°N 4.1451°W

The Drum Theatre is a theatre in Plymouth, England, part of the Theatre Royal. The Drum Theatre has a capacity of 200 people and specialises in the production of new plays. It won the Peter Brook Empty Space Award in 2007, and often collaborates with other subsidised companies and venues such as the Royal Court, ATC, the Lyric Hammersmith, the Bush Theatre, Frantic Assembly, Hampstead Theatre, Paines Plough, the Traverse Theatre and the Tron Glasgow. In 2007 it put on a production of Flower Girls, a play featuring disabled women.
