= The Bunker (theatre) =

Fringe theatre in London 2016–2020

Coordinates: 51.505°N 0.095°W

The Bunker was a fringe theatre in Southwark, London, England, from 2016 to 2020.

The theatre was a converted underground car park at 53A Southwark Street, London, and had 110 seats. It opened in October 2016, the first production being Skin a Cat.

It was awarded "Fringe Theatre of the Year" in The Stage Awards 2020. Productions at The Bunker recognised by the industry as nominees or winners of Offies, include Cardboard Citizens (2018-Ensemble); Eyes Closed, Ears Covered (2018-Best supporting male in a play, Lighting Design, Most Promising New Playwright); Box Clever (2020-Best Female Performance), and Little Miss Burden (2020-Best New Play, Best director). In 2020 the theatre won the Offies People’s Vote Winner for Best Programming Policy and People’s Vote Winner for Best Social Media Presence & Activities, and Chris Sonnex, its artistic director, was given a Special Award "for his ambitious achievements at the theatre".

The theatre was run by David Ralf (Executive Director), Chris Sonnex (Artistic Director), Hannah Roza Fisher (Head of Production), Lee Whitelock (General Manager), Ed Theakston (FOH and Access Manager) and Holly Adomah Thompson (Marketing Manager).

The theatre was closed by the landowners in March 2020 for site redevelopment.
