= 62nd Evening Standard Theatre Awards =

- Date: 13 November 2016
- Location: The Old Vic
- Hosted by: Rob Brydon

Highlights
- Most wins: Jesus Christ Superstar (2)
- Most nominations: Groundhog Day, Harry Potter and the Cursed Child and Ma Rainey’s Black Bottom (3)

The 62nd Evening Standard Theatre Awards were awarded, on 13 November 2016 at The Old Vic, in recognition of the 2016–17 London Theatre season. Nominations for the Radio 2 Audience Award for Best Musical were announced in October 2016, followed by the full list of nominations in November 2016. The ceremony was presented by Rob Brydon and co-hosted by Elton John and Evgeny Lebedev.

== Eligibility and nominators ==
Shows were eligible if they opened in London between 22 November 2015 and 30 September 2016.

The advisory judging panel comprised Daily Mail columnist Baz Bamigboye, WhatsOnStage writer Sarah Crompton, Evening Standard chief theatre critic Henry Hitchings, The Guardian culture writer and broadcaster Mark Lawson, Evening Standard editor Sarah Sands and New York Times International London theatre critic Matt Wolf.

== Ceremony ==
=== Presenters ===
- Eileen Atkins presented Best Revival
- James McAvoy presented the Natasha Richardson Award for Best Actress

=== Performances ===
- Elton John and the cast of The Lion King performed "Circle of Life"
- Amber Riley performed "And I Am Telling You I'm Not Going" from Dreamgirls

=== Sponsors ===
Burberry, Christian Louboutin and Hiscox were partners of the event, the latter of which was the official arts partner.

The following awards were presented in partnership:

- Best Play was awarded in partnership with Hiscox
- Emerging Talent was awarded in partnership with Burberry

== Non-competitive awards ==
The Beyond Theatre Award was awarded to David Attenborough for his contribution to broadcasting.

The Editor's Award was awarded to Good Chance Theatre.

The Lebedev Award was awarded to Kenneth Branagh in recognition of his plays at the Garrick Theatre.

== Winners and nominees ==
Best Play	Best Revival
Harry Potter and the Cursed Child by J. K. Rowling, Jack Thorne and John Tiffany, Palace Theatre; Father Comes Home From The Wars (Parts 1, 2 and 3) by Suzan-Lori Parks, Royal Court Theatre; The Flick by Annie Baker, National Theatre Dorfman	No Man's Land, Wyndham's Theatre; Les Blancs, National Theatre Olivier; Ma Rainey's Black Bottom, National Theatre Lyttelton; Young Chekhov: Platonov, Ivanov and The Seagull, Chichester Festival Theatre and National Theatre Olivier
Best Actor	Natasha Richardson Award for Best Actress
Ralph Fiennes, The Master Builder/Richard III, The Old Vic/Almeida Theatre; Kenneth Branagh, The Entertainer, Garrick Theatre; O. T. Fagbenle, Ma Rainey's Black Bottom, National Theatre Lyttelton; James McArdle, Platonov, Chichester Festival Theatre and National Theatre Olivier; Ian McKellen, No Man's Land, Wyndham's Theatre	Billie Piper, Yerma, Young Vic; Noma Dumezweni, Linda, Royal Court Theatre; Helen McCrory, The Deep Blue Sea, National Theatre Lyttelton; Sophie Melville, Iphigenia in Splott, National Theatre Temporary Theatre and Sherman Theatre
Radio 2 Audience Award for Best Musical	Best Musical Performance
Jesus Christ Superstar, Regent's Park Open Air Theatre; Funny Girl, Menier Chocolate Factory and Savoy Theatre; Groundhog Day, The Old Vic; Guys and Dolls, Phoenix Theatre and Savoy Theatre; Our Ladies of Perpetual Succour, National Theatre Dorfman; Sunset Boulevard, London Coliseum	Glenn Close, Sunset Boulevard, London Coliseum; Andy Karl, Groundhog Day, The Old Vic; Sheridan Smith, Funny Girl, Menier Chocolate Factory and Savoy Theatre
Milton Shulman Award for Best Director	Best Design
John Malkovich, Good Canary, Rose Theatre Kingston; Dominic Cooke, Ma Rainey's Black Bottom, National Theatre Lyttelton; John Tiffany, Harry Potter and the Cursed Child, Palace Theatre	Gareth Fry and Pete Malkin, The Encounter, Barbican Theatre; Jon Bausor, You For Me For You, Royal Court Theatre; Rob Howell, The Master Builder and Groundhog Day, The Old Vic
Charles Wintour Award for Most Promising Playwright	Emerging Talent Award
Charlene James, Cuttin’ It, Royal Court Theatre and Young Vic; Jon Brittain, Rotterdam, Theatre 503 and Trafalgar Studios; David Ireland, Cyprus Avenue, Royal Court Theatre	Tyrone Huntley, Jesus Christ Superstar, Regent's Park Open Air Theatre; Jaygann Ayeh, The Flick, National Theatre Dorfman; Anthony Boyle, Harry Potter and the Cursed Child, Palace Theatre; Aoife Duffin, A Girl is a Half-formed Thing/The Taming Of The Shrew, Dublin Corn Exchange and Young Vic/Shakespeare's Globe

=== Multiple awards ===
2 awards

- Jesus Christ Superstar

=== Multiple nominations ===
3 nominations

- Groundhog Day
- Harry Potter and the Cursed Child
- Ma Rainey's Black Bottom

2 nominations

- The Flick
- Funny Girl
- Jesus Christ Superstar
- The Master Builder
- No Man's Land
- Platonov
- Sunset Boulevard

== See also ==
- 2015 Laurence Olivier Awards
- 2016 Laurence Olivier Awards
