= Jon Brittain =

British playwright and director

- Born: 1987 (age 38–39); Chester, England
- Education: University of East Anglia; Goldsmiths, University of London
- Occupations: Playwright; Comedy writer; Director

Jon Brittain (born May 1987) is an Olivier Award-winning playwright, comedy writer and director.

== Early life ==
Brittain was born in Chester in the northwest of England and grew up in the Netherlands, where he attended the British School in The Netherlands. He graduated from the University of East Anglia with a BA in 2008, and now lives in Tooting.

== Career ==
Brittain's play Rotterdam received its world premiere at Theatre503 in October 2015 and subsequently was nominated for the Offie for Best New Play. In 2017, the play won an Olivier Award for Outstanding Achievement In An Affiliate Theatre. He was also nominated for the Evening Standard's Charles Wintour Award for the Most Promising Playwright.

Previously, he co-wrote the Fringe First Award winning A Super Happy Story (About Feeling Super Sad) and co-created the cult-hit show Margaret Thatcher Queen of Soho, starring Matt Tedford as well as its sequels Margaret Thatcher Queen of Game Shows and Margaret Thatcher Queen of Hollywood.

As a director, he's worked on stand-up comedian John Kearns Edinburgh Comedy Award winning shows Sight Gags for Perverts and Shtick. He's also worked on shows for Tom Allen, Alfie Brown, Mat Ewins, Janine Harouni, Ania Magliano, Sara Pascoe, and Tom Rosenthal.

He directed the original stage production of Baby Reindeer by Richard Gadd who won Edinburgh Festival Fringe and Scotsman Fringe First Award for New Writing and an Olivier Award for Achievement in Affiliate Theatre.

In television, he was a writer during season 2 of The Amazing World of Gumball and was a staff writer on seasons 3 and 4 of Netflix's The Crown. With Richard Naylor, he was head writer and co-executive producer of The Completely Made-Up Adventures of Dick Turpin.

Brittain wrote the book and lyrics for the musical Kathy and Stella Solve a Murder!, with Matthew Floyd Jones (music and lyrics), and co-directed the West End production at the Ambassadors Theatre, London in 2024 with Fabian Aloise, produced by Francesca Moody.

In April 2026, it was announced he was adapting the 2019 film Fighting with My Family into a stage musical, alongside Miranda Cooper and Nick Coler. They previously wrote the UK Theatre Award winning show Billionaire Boy The Musical for NST Southampton Theatres.

== Awards and nominations ==
Year	Award	Category	Nominated work(s)	Result	Refs
2016	Evening Standard Theatre Awards	Charles Wintour Award for Most Promising Playwright	Rotterdam	Nominated	
2017	Laurence Olivier Awards	Outstanding Achievement In An Affiliate Theatre	Rotterdam - at Trafalgar Studios 2	Won	
2017	Musical Theatre Review Award	Best Musical at Edinburgh Festival Fringe	A Super Happy Story (about feeling super sad)	Won	
2019	UK Theatre Awards	Best Show for Children and Young People	Billionaire Boy the Musical	Won	
2020	Offie	Best New Musical	A Super Happy Story (about feeling super sad)	Nominated	
2020	Laurence Olivier Awards	Outstanding Achievement In An Affiliate Theatre	Baby Reindeer - at The Bush Theatre (director)	Won	
2022	Musical Theatre Review Award	Best Musical at Edinburgh Festival Fringe	Kathy and Stella Solve a Murder!	Won	
