= Inter Varsity Dance Competition =

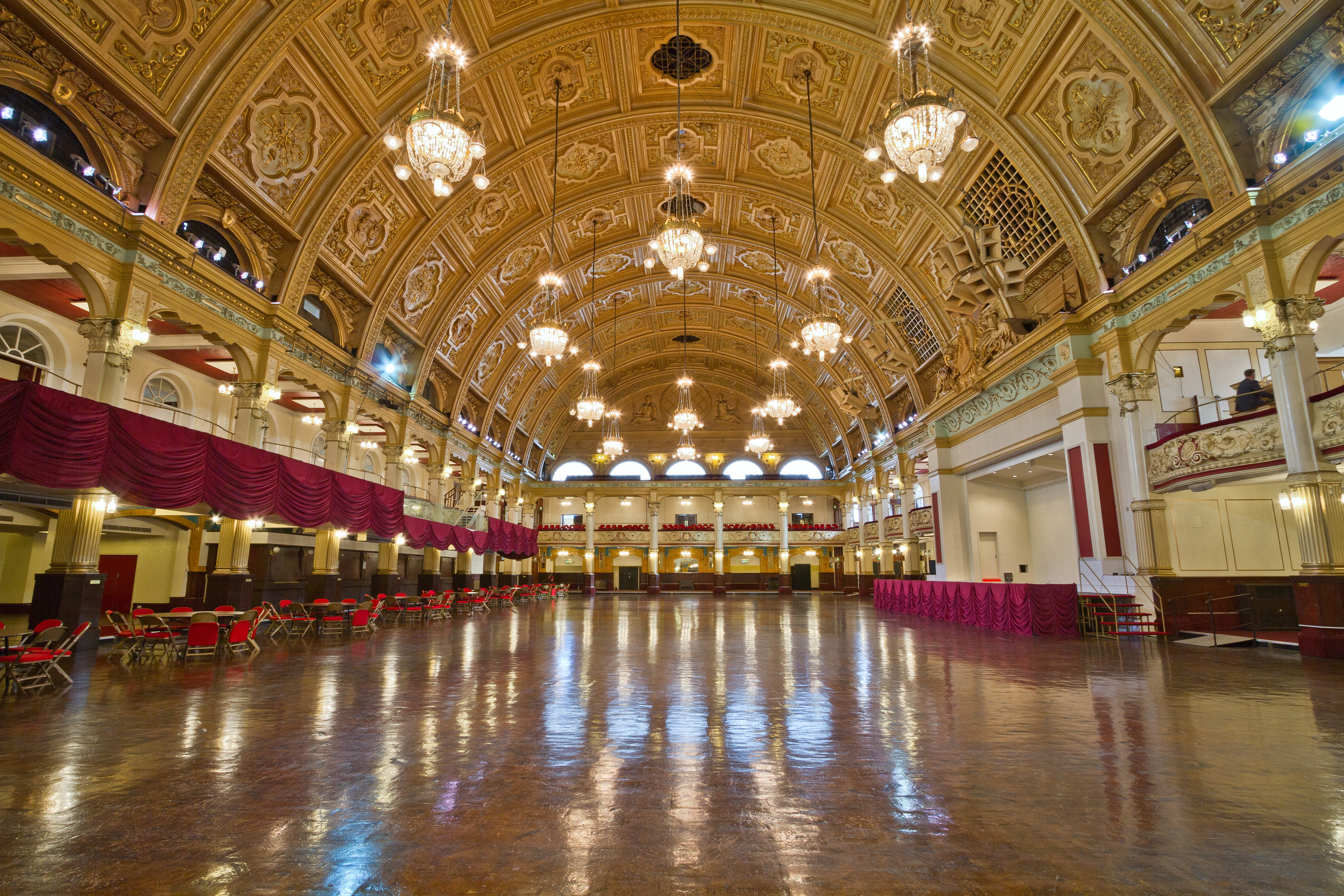
- Empress Ballroom competition venue
- Nickname: IVDC
- Genre: Dancesport competition
- Frequency: Annual, last Saturday in February
- Venue: Winter Gardens, Blackpool (since 2007)
- Locations: Blackpool, England, UK
- Inaugurated: 1962; 64 years ago
- Most recent: February 28, 2026
- Participants: 592 couples (2026)
- Major events: Ballroom; Latin; Rock 'n' Roll; Team Match; Offbeat (Freestyle)
- Organiser: Inter Varsity Dance Association (IVDA)
- Website: www.universitydancesport.com

The Inter Varsity Dance Competition (IVDC) is an annual student dancesport competition organised by Inter Varsity Dance Association (IVDA). The IVDA write rules regarding entries, dress code and which dances will be part of the competition.

All UK universities may send representatives provided they are a member of the IVDA, and students who study at universities that do not have teams may gain special consideration to dance for another university. Teams from all across the UK compete including teams from Wales (e.g. Cardiff), Scotland (e.g. Edinburgh) and England (e.g. London). 30 UK university teams took part in the 2026 IVDC.

Whilst dancesport in the UK has seen a decline that shows like Strictly Come Dancing have rectified, the Inter Varsity Dance Association (IVDA) has remained consistently popular and struggles to find a UK venue large enough for its annual competition. Since 2007 the competitions have been hosted at the Winter Gardens, Blackpool. The 2026 competition saw 592 couples compete, which is nearly back to pre-pandemic levels, as the 2020 competition saw 678 couples compete.

As of 2026 the US has a similarly strong student scene, culminating in various tournament's across the country. Mainland Europe has the slightly smaller European Tournament for Dancing Students, which has been running in multiple countries since 1989, with participants attending from Great Britain on a smaller scale.

== Competition and events ==
IVDC is an annual event running since 1962 and hosted by different UK member universities and normally occurs in the last weekend in February or first weekend in March each year. There are individual competitions during the day in ballroom, Latin, salsa, rock'n'roll, offbeat and the Team Match.

For the Latin and Ballroom Events students are divided according to experience: Beginner, Novice, Intermediate and Advanced. Ex Students are also able to compete in some competitions. In lower ranking competitions dress restrictions apply. Beginners are encouraged and there is the "Best Beginners Team Trophy" which presented to the university with the most successful beginners overall. Other individual returnable trophies available:

- The Timur Olegovich Gulinskiy Advanced modern Trophy (In memory of a Leeds Dancesport Student who died whilst studying in 2000)
- The Novice Modern Trophy
- The Intermediate Modern Trophy
- The Far’s Advanced Latin Trophy
- The Novice Latin Trophy
- The Intermediate Latin Trophy
- Ex-students ballroom trophy
- Ex-students Latin trophy
- The Dance Basics best Beginners’ Trophy (awarded to the Beginner couple finishing highest over all four Beginners’ events)
- The Choice of London Rock ‘n’ Roll Trophy
- The Edna Murphy Shield (presented to the most promising couple, as decided by the Chairman of Adjudicators)
- The Far’s Dance Best Newcomer Trophy (awarded to the couple who receive the highestmarks in the team match and who have never competed in an IVDC team match before)

The Offbeat Competition is a "Fun" team "freestyle" even - the university can enter a three-minute routine in any dance style. Interpretations vary from fun routines such as "The Full Monty" to serious high quality street dance routines. The Offbeat Winners Shield is presented to the winning team.

The most important event of the competition is the team match, which pits teams of up to 48 dancers from each member university against each other. These are split into teams of four couples (A, B, C, D, E, F) and each couple represents their University in one of Waltz, Cha Cha, Quickstep, and Jive. Progression is done as a team and scored across all four dances. This competition has undergone a drastic overhaul in recent years following innovations by Alistair Braden whilst at Bristol University. The team match is now a two-division system that ranks all universities entered, instead of the traditional team match. The following Team Trophies are awarded at IVDC:

- The EADA Overall IVDA Champions Trophy (presented to the university placed first in the overall rankings)
- The Choice IVDA Overall Runners-Up Trophy
- The Far’s Dance A-Team Winners Trophy
- The Choice IVDA A-Team Runners-Up Trophy
- The B-Team Winners Shield
- The IDTA B-TEam Runners-Up Trophy
- The C-Team Winners Shield
- The IDTA C-Team Runners-Up Trophy
- The D-Team Winners Trophy
- The IDTA D-Team Runners-Up Trophy
- The EADA IVDA Division 2 Winners Trophy
- The Choice IVDA Division 2 Runners-Up Trophy
- The IVDA Challenge Trophy (presented to the highest-placed university composed entirely of teams in division 2)

The trophies held in the highest regard are the EADA Overall trophy and the A-Team trophy.

== History of results ==
Year	A-Team Winners	Overall Champions	Ex-Student team match	Advanced ballroom	Advanced Latin	Offbeat	Location
2026	Oxford	Cambridge	Birmingham	Thomas Winter, Anna Duncan (Oxford)	Vladimir Dementyev, Wing Yeung (Bristol)	Liverpool	Winter Gardens, Blackpool
2025	Oxford	Cambridge	Birmingham	Thomas Winter, Anna Duncan (Oxford)	Grant Connor, Anna Duncan (Oxford)	Bath	Winter Gardens, Blackpool
2024	Oxford	Cambridge	Birmingham	Shaoyang Yuan, Chongxuan Qi (Edinburgh)	Peter Bath, Rosanna Shurvinton (Bristol)	Durham	Winter Gardens, Blackpool
2023	Imperial	Imperial	Imperial	Yo-Der Song, Maria Volovaya (Imperial)	Arthur Mui and Beth Gardiner (Birmingham)	Bath	Winter Gardens, Blackpool
2022	Imperial	Cambridge	Imperial	Tom Winter, Anna Duncan (Oxford)	Edoardo Chidichimo, Emily Gibbs (Cambridge)	Durham	Winter Gardens, Blackpool
2020	Oxford	Cambridge	Cambridge	Victor Solecki, Iris Roatis (Imperial)	Mathias Kirkegaard, Maria Pieridou (Bath)	Leicester	Winter Gardens, Blackpool
2019	Imperial	Cambridge	-	Pawel Bzinkowski, Aleksandra Modrzejewska (Oxford)	Matthew Cavuto, Mariya Pozdeyeva (Imperial)	Warwick	Winter Gardens, Blackpool
2018	Cambridge	Cambridge	-	Mathias Kirkegaard, Claire Kilding (Bath)	Nikita Fedorov, Katerina Tse (Durham)	Warwick	Winter Gardens, Blackpool
2017	Cambridge	Cambridge	-	Mathew Stoneman, Yasmine Young (London)	Tianci Ma, Adela Capilnasiu (Imperial)	Nottingham	Winter Gardens, Blackpool
2016	Cambridge	Cambridge	-	Filip Bar, Yasmine Young (Cambridge)	Roland Parandi, Jessica Quirke (Oxford)	Nottingham	Winter Gardens, Blackpool
2015	Cambridge	Cambridge	-	James Lewis, Rebecca Murray (Nottingham)	Kien Trinh, Kirsty Mary Davies (Cambridge)	Cardiff	Winter Gardens, Blackpool
2014	Cambridge	Cambridge	-	Joe Johnson, Eva Johnson (Cambridge)	Nathan Clark, Sarah Buckley (Bristol)	Manchester	Winter Gardens, Blackpool
2013	Oxford	Oxford	-	Kyle Taylor, Polina Shklyaeva (Liverpool)	Kyle Taylor, Polina Shklyaeva (Liverpool)	Kent	Winter Gardens, Blackpool
2012	Cambridge	Cambridge	-	Kyle Taylor, Polina Shklyaeva (Liverpool)	Kyle Taylor, Poline Shklyaeva (Liverpool)	Liverpool	Winter Gardens, Blackpool
2011	Oxford	Oxford	-	Graham Dixon, Robyn Price (Nottingham)	Arman Sahovic, Maria Naumchenko (Imperial)	Birmingham	Winter Gardens, Blackpool
2010	Oxford	Oxford	-	Arman Sahovic, Maria Naumchenko (Imperial)	Tudor Balan, Janet Gooi (Manchester)	Imperial	Winter Gardens, Blackpool
2009	Cambridge	Cambridge	-	Arman Sahovic, Anne Marie Wirth (Imperial)	Peter Kecskemethy, Reka Balogh (Oxford)	Warwick	Winter Gardens, Blackpool
2008	Cambridge	Cambridge	-	Ryan Lamb, Katie Armstrong (Durham)	Ivan Lubenko, Pippa Underwood (Oxford)		Winter Gardens, Blackpool
2007	Cambridge	Cambridge	-	Ryan Lamb, Katie Armstrong (Durham)	Lev Kravchencko, Toni Isaacs (Bristol)	Imperial	Winter Gardens, Blackpool
2006	Cambridge	Cambridge	-	Paul Fannon, Vesna Kadelburg (Cambridge)	Alexander Hobbs, Samantha Jayatilaka (Imperial)		Guildford Spectrum
2005	Bristol	Oxford	-	Nick Faull, Ju Min Wong (Oxford)	Arun Arumugam, Lisa Pesik (Bristol)	Imperial	Winter Gardens, Blackpool
2004	Oxford	Oxford	-	Paul Fannon, Vesna Kadelburg (Cambridge)	Nick Faull, Harriet Smith (Oxford)	Sheffield	Stoke-on-Trent
2003	Oxford, Cambridge, Cardiff (3 way tie)	Oxford	-	Paul Fannon, Vesna Kadelburg (Cambridge)	Scott Bradley, Sarah Adams (Cambridge)	Bristol	Watford
2002	Oxford	Oxford	-	Martin Bird, Shelley Bird (Reading)	Igor Strukov, Rebecca Emmott (Sheffield)	Sheffield	Stoke-on-Trent
2001	Oxford	Oxford	-	Martin Bird, Shelley Bird (Reading)	Ellis Williams, Indika Gunaratne (Imperial)	Cambridge	Stoke-on-Trent
2000	Cambridge	Oxford	-	Martin Bird, Shelley Bird(Reading)	George Georghiou, Lucy Jones (Cambridge)	London	Guildford
1999	Imperial	Imperial	-	S Richmond & J.Silmon-Clyde (Imperial)		Essex	Oxford (Oxford Brookes Sports Hall)
1998	London	London	-	A Walker & S.E Long (Liv/York)		Sheffield	Manchester (Winsford)
1997	Imperial	Imperial	-	A Walker & J Killup (Liv)		Imperial	London (Watford Colosseum)
1996	Imperial	Imperial	-	Mark Birchenough, Shannah Long (Liv/York)		Bath	UEA
1995	Oxford		-	Mark Birchenough, Shannah Long (Liv/York)		Imperial	Hull
1994	Imperial		-	Mark Birchenough, Shannah Long (Liv/York)		Nottingham	Liverpool
1993	Imperial		-	P Latter & H Schafer (Cambridge)		Imperial	London (Grosvenor House Great Room)
1992	Imperial		-	MC Bath & G Rydill (Liv)		Manchester	Nottingham
1991	Imperial		-	MC Robinson & CA Turner (B'ham)		Bath	Birmingham
1990	Oxford		-	MC Robinson & CA Turner (Aston)			Hull
1989	Cambridge		-	S Thompson & M Webber (Bristol)			Southampton
1988	Leeds		-				Liverpool
1987	Cambridge		-				Bristol
1986	Cambridge		-				Leicester
1985	Imperial		-				Cambridge
1984	Oxford		-				Warwick
1983	Oxford		-				Lancaster
1982	Oxford		-				Southampton
1981	Lancaster		-				Oxford
1980	Oxford		-				Cambridge
1979	Cambridge		-				Lancaster
1978	Liverpool		-				Liverpool
1977	Liverpool		-				Imperial
1976	Liverpool		-				Exeter
1975	Liverpool		-				Newcastle
1974	Liverpool		-			Manchester	Imperial - Lyceum Ballroom
1973	Leeds		-				Manchester
1972	Leeds		-				Liverpool
1971	Leeds		-				Leeds - Leeds Refectory
1970	Manchester		-				Bristol
1969	Cambridge		-				
1968	UCL		-				
1967	Liverpool		-				
1966	Liverpool		-				
1965	Leicester		-				
1964	Liverpool		-				
1963	Manchester		-				

== See also ==
- Ballroom dance
- Competitive dance
- Dance basic topics
