= European Tournament for Dancing Students =

European varsity dance competition

European Tournament for Dancing Students (ETDS)
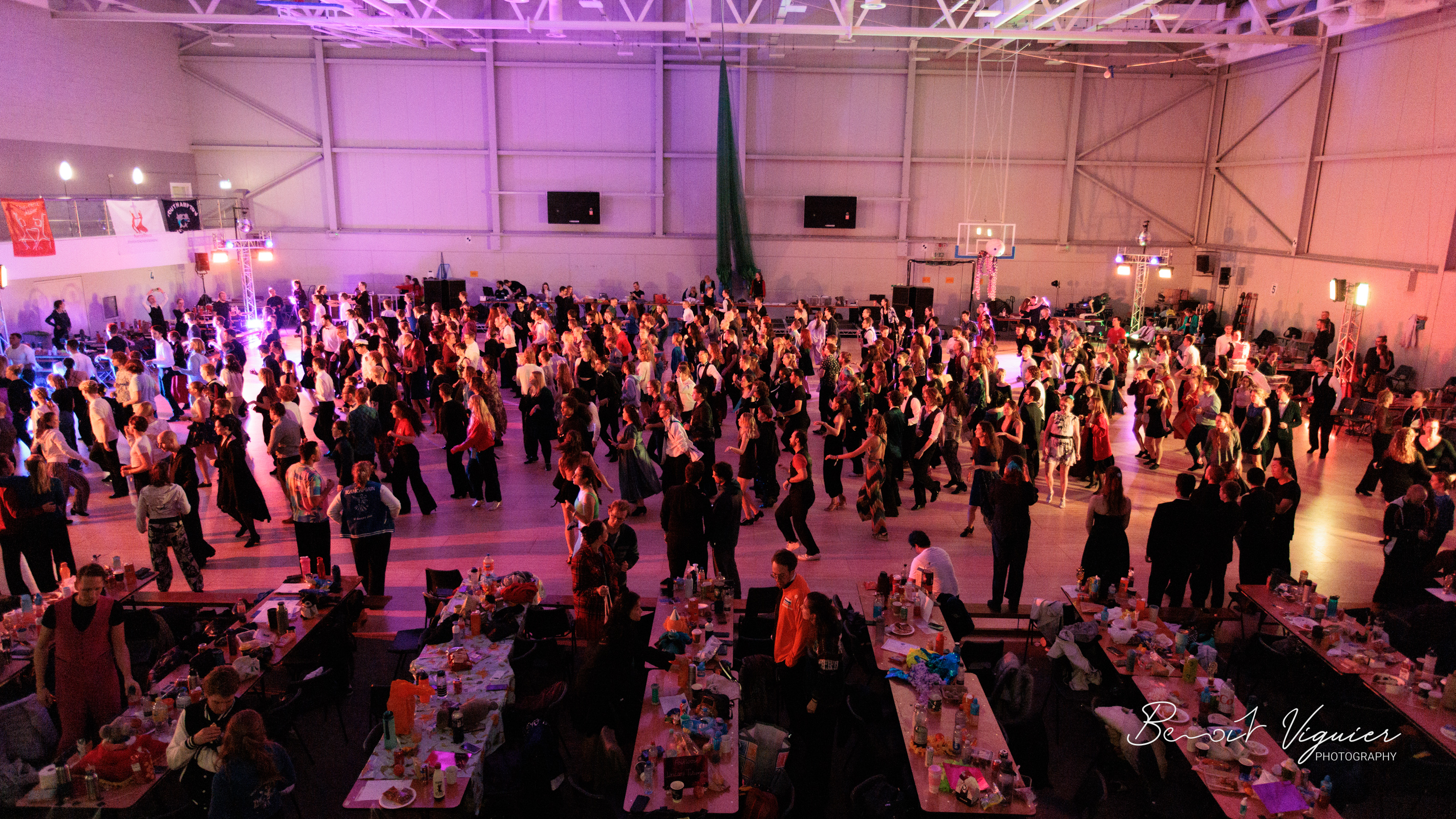
- The 68th Autumn ETDS "Under the Sea" in Southampton, UK

Tournament information
- Sport: Dancesport
- Location: Europe
- Established: 1989
- Administrator: Stichting Dansende Studenten (Dancing Student Association)
- Tournament format: 3 Day series of Dancesport competitions with festivities in between.
- Host: Various European Universities
- Participants: 600+ biannually

Tournament statistics
- Tournament Editions: 70
- Participating Countries: Germany, Netherlands, United Kingdom, Switzerland, Poland, Sweden, Hungary, France

The European Tournament for Dancing Students (ETDS) (formerly Universitäten-Breitensport-Tanzturnier, Internationales Uni-Tanzturnier) is a biannual Ballroom and Latin-American dance competition for university students across Europe.

Established in 1989 by German university teams from Clausthal, Braunschweig, and Kiel, it brings together dancers of various skill levels for a weekend of competition, social events, and cultural exchange. The tournament is hosted by different universities each edition, rotating across European cities. While primarily an international student sporting event, the ETDS also emphasizes inclusivity, social interaction, and community-building among international student dance societies.

Since its inception, the tournament has evolved significantly, with milestones such as the introduction of the iconic Tanzmaus trophy, the establishment of multiple skill categories, and its expansion into Continental Europe. Notably, the event welcomes both Students and Alumni to participate (although the latter expanded into the Festival for Dancing Dinos). The ETDS has been mostly hosted in Germany and the Netherlands, but since the 2010s has expanded into the Czech Republic, the United Kingdom, and, for the first time in 2025, Switzerland.

With each edition, ETDS continues to unite dancers from diverse backgrounds, maintaining its reputation as a cornerstone of the European student dance scene.

== Format ==
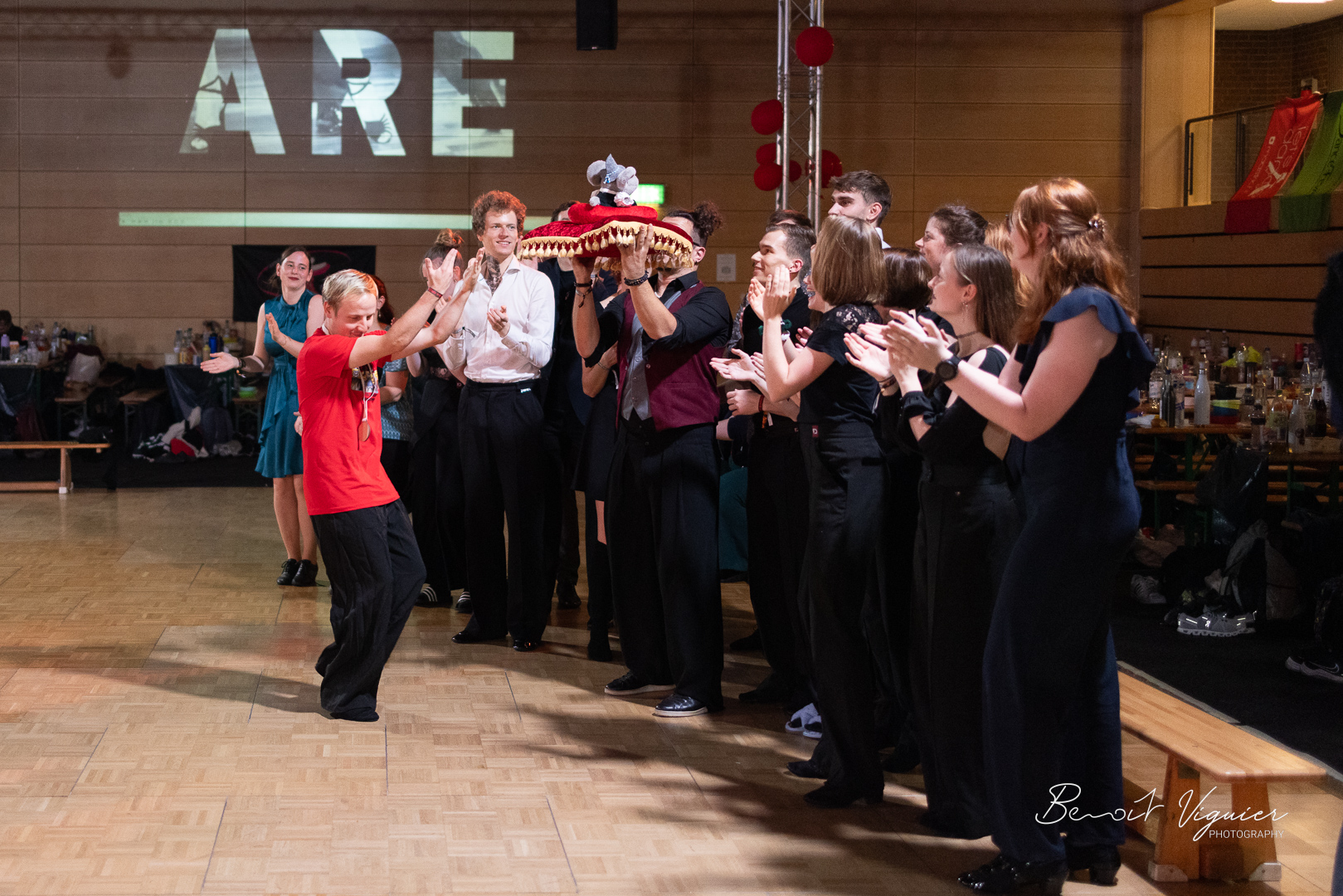
The winning team with the "Tanzmaus" Trophy photographed by Benoit Viguier.

The ETDS spans four days, commencing on a Friday evening and concluding on Monday morning. While each ETDS is individual in its rules, contents and schedule, the event typically includes:

- Blind date program: On Friday evening, the vast majority of the Breitensport category pair up. The tournament uniquely enters most of its dancers as individuals to pair up just for the weekend, rather than couples.
- Competitions: Across Saturday and Sunday, participants take part in Ballroom and Latin Dancesport. This includes competing in DanceSport with their "Blind Date" partners, or "Jack and Jill" style.
- Social Events: Recent ETDS' have included a Themed party on Saturday and a Gala Ball on Sunday evening.
- Logistics: The hosting university provides sleeping accommodations and catering for participants and volunteers.

Additional events have been included to individual tournaments at the discretion of the organisers, such as the University Team Match/Varsity (Southampton), Discofox, Salsa and Polka.

=== Organisation ===
Each ETDS is hosted by a different university dance association. The competition location changes biannually, primarily occurring in Germany and the Netherlands. The 2015 edition in Brno, Czech Republic, marked the first instance of the tournament being held outside these two countries. The 68th ETDS in Southampton, UK, was the first to be hosted in the United Kingdom. The 69th ETDS in Wettingen was the first in Switzerland.

== History ==
The European Tournament for Dancing Students (ETDS) began as a small gathering of university dance teams from Clausthal, Braunschweig, and Kiel, who sought to connect through friendly competition. In its earliest days, the event was organized on an ad-hoc basis, with participants easily finding accommodation due to the small numbers.

A defining tradition emerged in November 1990 with the introduction of der Tanzmaus, a plush mouse awarded to the winning university, who would "host" it until the next tournament. Donated by Kiel University, Clausthal was the first to claim this prize. As word spread, the tournament grew. By December 1991, Berlin had joined, eventually hosting the event during Sinterklaas in 1993. The early tournaments had no separate skill divisions, and teams of all levels competed together.

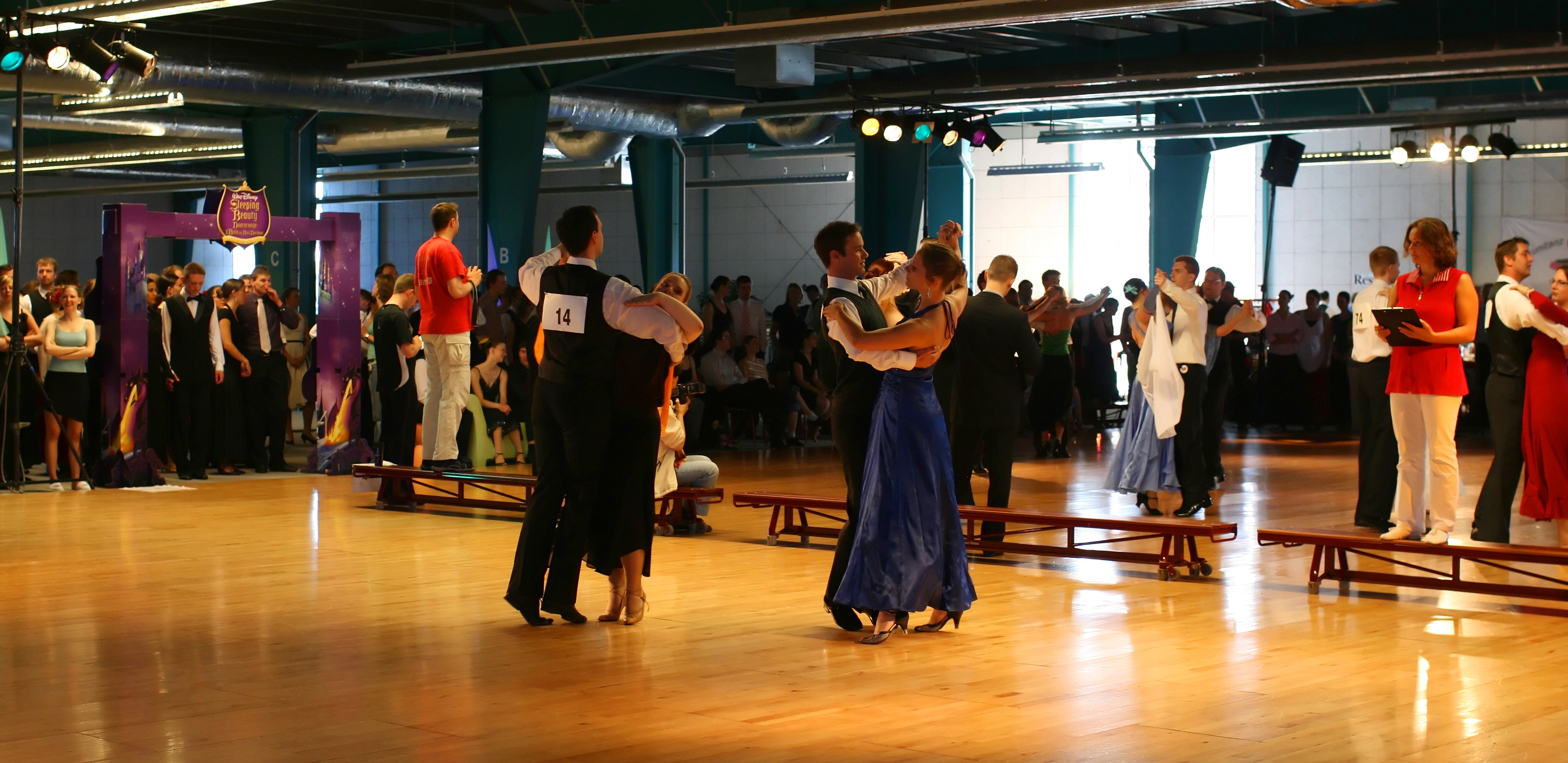
The 41st ETDS in Groningen, 2009.

Over the next few years, participation expanded. Dortmund joined in April 1992, followed later by Ulm and Marburg. By the spring of 1994, ETDS had gained momentum, with 15 German universities involved. That same year, the Netherlands entered the competition, with teams from Delft, Eindhoven, Mainz, Geisenheim, and Kaiserslautern. However, the rapid growth brought challenges. In autumn 1994, administrative issues in Kiel resulted in the university being barred from hosting for five years. The following spring, ETDS introduced skill divisions, splitting competitors into "Amateurs" and "Profis." Leipzig also joined at this time.

In the summer of 1995, ETDS reached a new milestone—it was held outside of Germany for the first time, with Eindhoven hosting in the Netherlands. The event had now evolved from an informal gathering into a biannual tradition, occurring every Pentecost and autumn at a rotating university. Groningen joined this same year. By 2004, a third skill division, "Masters," was added to the Breitensport section. At the 41st tournament in 2009 hosted in Groningen, over 500 dancers competed, leading to the creation of the "Champions" category. Just three years later, at Pentecost in 2012, ETDS welcomed 570 participants.

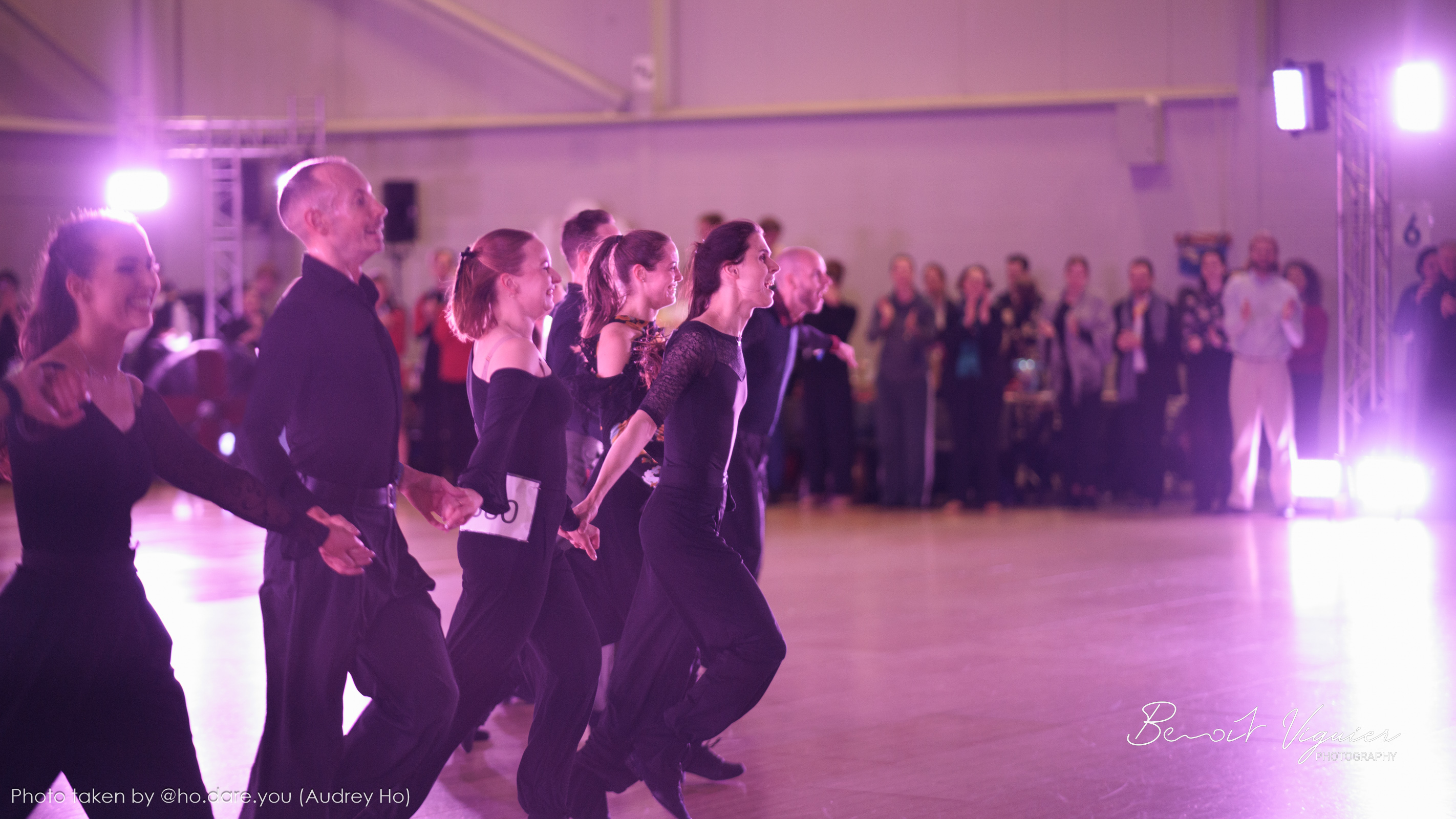
Open Class Ballroom final bow, 68th ETDS 2024.

Expansion beyond its founding countries came in October 2015, when Brno, Czech Republic, became the first non-German or Dutch host. The international reach of ETDS continued to grow, culminating in two historic editions in the Southampton, United Kingdom and Wettingen, Switzerland, the first in both countries. The UK version welcomed British university teams on a large scale, with participants from universities including Imperial College London, University of Bath, University of Cambridge, University of London, University of Oxford, University of St Andrews and many more. This ETDS spearheaded a joint effort between the University of Bristol and the University of Southampton. The Swiss ETDS was acclaimed for its tournament quality and organisation. This also makes history as the first time two consecutive tournaments have taken place outside Germany and the Netherlands.

== Competition Structure ==
Because the focus of each individual organization alters the balance between social orientation and competition, Each ETDS to a degree is individual. Nevertheless, participants typically expect the following rules during each tournament:

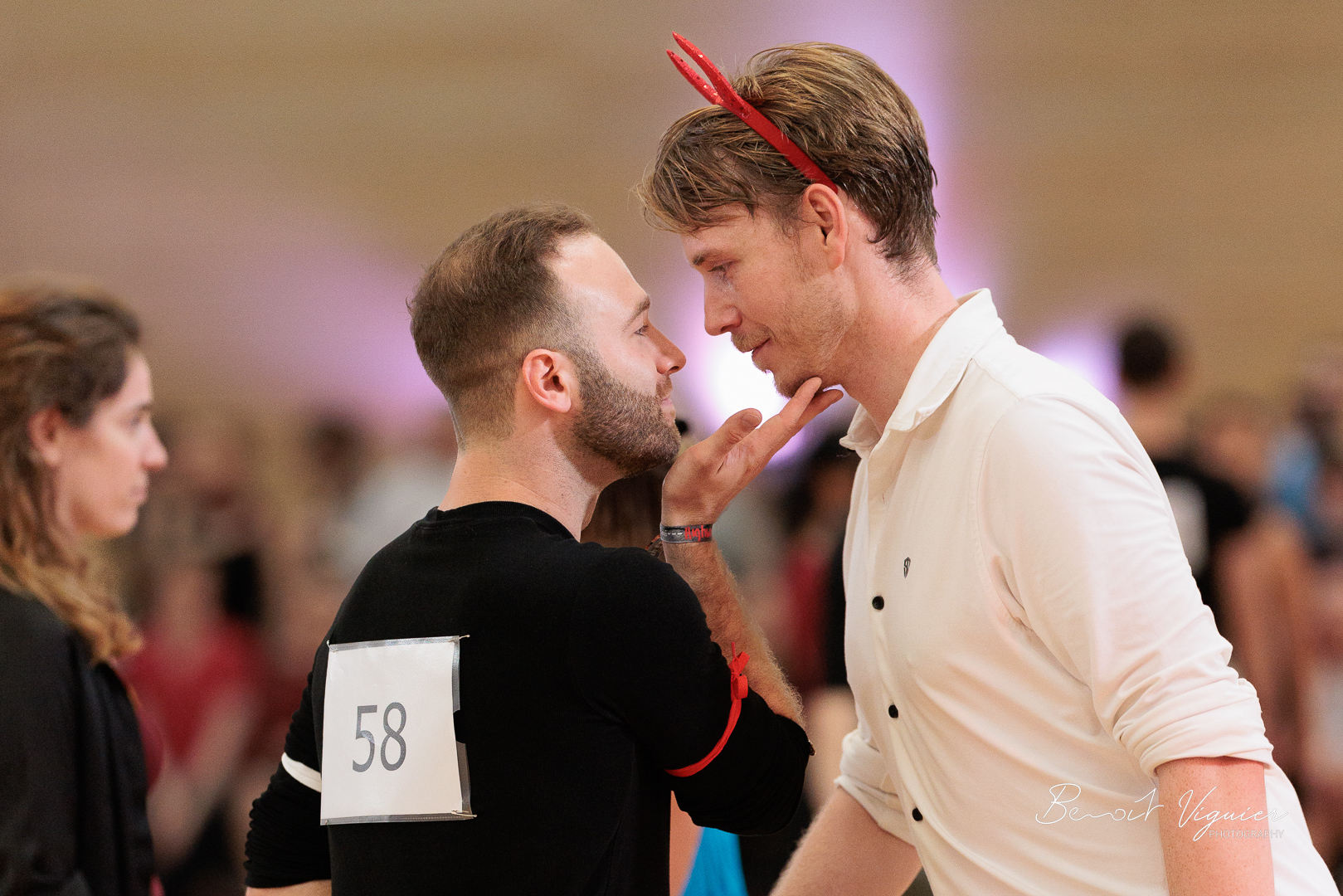
Same-Sex dancers during the 66th ETDS "Highway to Hell" photographed by Benoit Viguier.

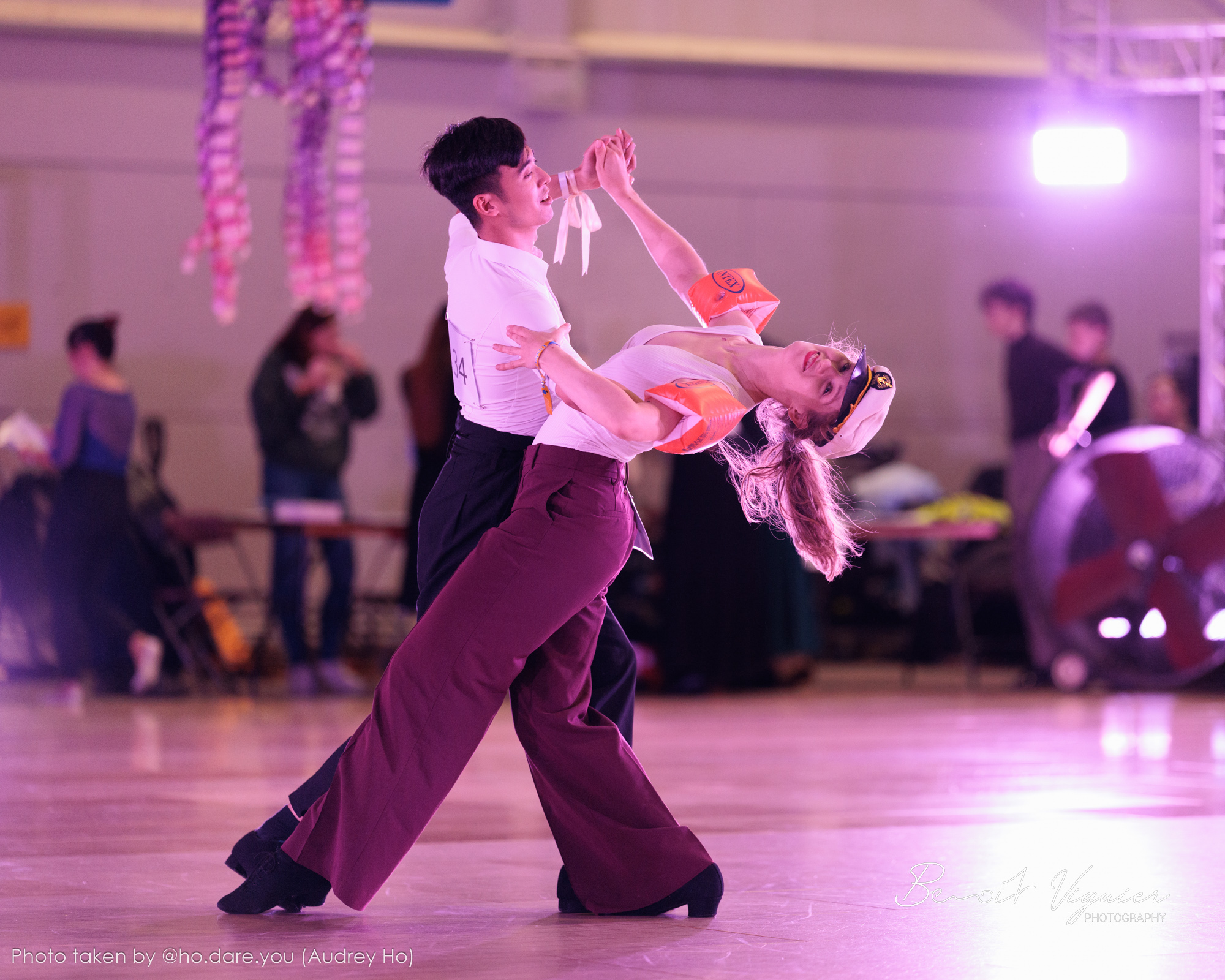
Open Class dancing during "Under the Sea". The competitors can choose more traditional dancewear or stylise it with the ETDS Theme. Photographed by Benoit Viguier.

=== Structure ===
Dancers can sign up for two disciplines, Ballroom/Standard Dance and Latin-American Dance. Dancers are divided into categories based on experience:

- Breitensport Class: German for amateur sport, the Breitensport category hosts the majority of competitors, and begins with a qualifier to sort competitors into six categories based on level.

Past levels have been named Enthusiasts, Amateurs, Professionals, Masters, Champions and Legends. (Note: the titles given here are not tied to any other competition classification outside the ETDS)

- Open Class: For advanced dancers, generally equivalent to B to S class competitors in WDSF, A to S Class in the NADB, and Prechamp/Amateur in WDC.

Due to the increasing standard of university dancing, some hosting universities decide to provide another separate tournament for a class called CloseD, which consists of dancers of the class one class below Open. The name is the opposite of the Open class and also shows by the capitalized letters the DTV tournament classes (C class and D class) assigned to the CloseD at inception. This has appeared as a separate category, a repechage or the lower result of a qualifying round which splits the Open Class.

These tournaments rules are decided by the organisers and the governing body Stichting Dansende Studenten (Dancing Student Association). There are winner's certificates and medals for all participants in the finals as well as trophies (instead of medals) for the podium finishers, in some instances organisers design their own trophies and awards.

=== Adjudication ===
The adjudicators usually are volunteers from the ETDS community. Adjudicators are selected by their adjudicator's license, by their experience adjudicating previous ETDS' or by their competitive level.

== Nationalities ==
Every European university or student dance society can participate.

The record for the most teams participating in an ETDS was set at 68th ETDS Southampton, where 50 teams from 11 countries took part.

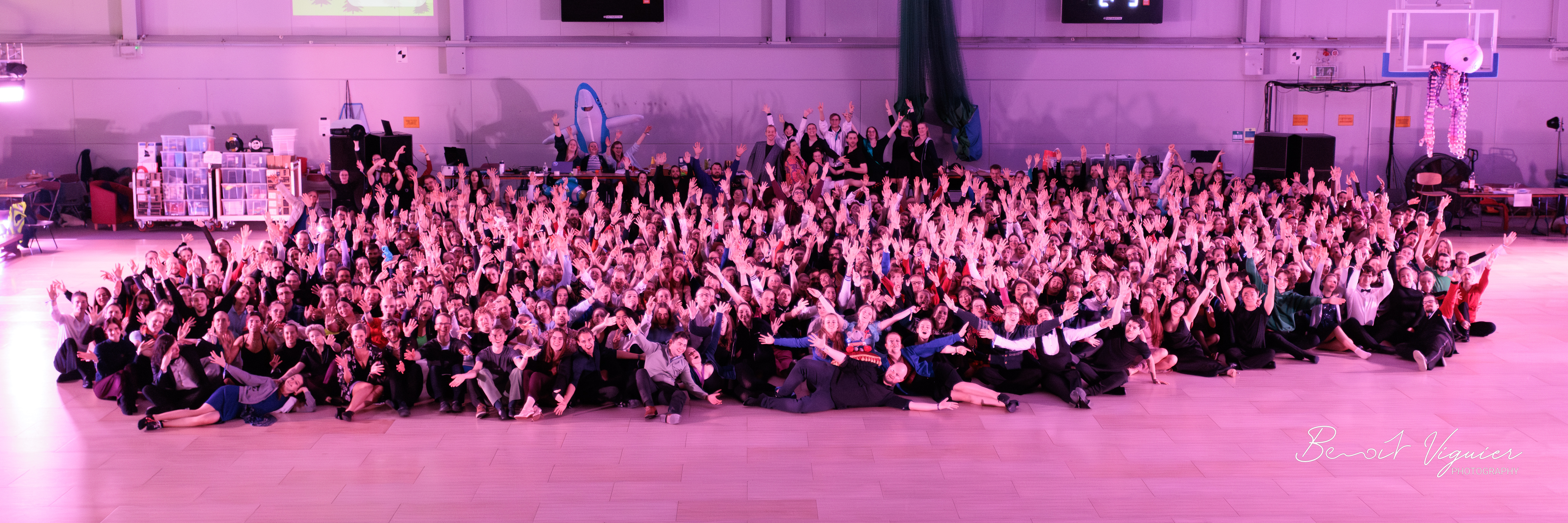
Group Photo of the 68th ETDS "Under the Sea" photographed by Benoit Viguier.

List of all participating teams
Society Name	University	Country	Notes
Unitanz Aachen	RWTH Aachen University	Germany	Hosted in 1993 (autumn), 1997 (Pentecost), 2001, 2006, 2010, 2017, 2025 (Pentecost).
S.D.V. AmsterDance	University of Amsterdam	Netherlands	Hosted in 2023 (Pentecost).
Antibes	N/A	France	
Bath University Latin & Ballroom (BULB)	University of Bath	United Kingdom	Participating university. Set to host in 2026.
Unitanz Berlin	TU Berlin	Germany	Hosted in 1993 (Pentecost), 1996, 1998, 2002, 2007, 2015.
Unitanz Bielefeld	Bielefeld University	Germany	Participating university.
Bonn	N/A	Germany	Inactive team.
Bournemouth University BLD (BUBLDS)	Bournemouth University	United Kingdom	Participated in the 68th ETDS in Southampton.
Unitanz Braunschweig	TU Braunschweig	Germany	Hosted the first ETDS in 1989.
Bristol University Latin American Ballroom Dance Society (BULABDS)	University of Bristol	United Kingdom	Joined in 2023. Hosted in 2024.
Brno	N/A	Czech Republic	Hosted in 2015 and 2018.
Budapest	Budapest University of Technology and Economics	Hungary	Participating university.
Cambridge Dancers Club (CDC)	University of Cambridge	United Kingdom	Participating university.
Cape Town	N/A	South Africa	First recorded participation outside Europe.
CU Dancesport	Cardiff University	United Kingdom	Participated in the 68th ETDS in Southampton.
Unitanz Clausthal	Clausthal University of Technology	Germany	Hosted in 1991, 1992, 1996, 1999, 2003, 2006, 2019.
Unitanz Cottbus	N/A	Germany	Inactive team.
Crimea	Crimean Federal University	Ukraine	Participates under another university.
Unitanz Darmstadt	Technische Universität Darmstadt	Germany	Participating university.
D.S.D.A. Blue Suede Shoes	Delft University of Technology	Netherlands	Hosted in 2020 (postponed to 2022).
Unitanz Dortmund	Technical University of Dortmund	Germany	Hosted in 1995 (Pentecost), 2000, 2007.
Unitanz Düsseldorf	Heinrich Heine University Düsseldorf, Düsseldorf University of Applied Sciences	Germany	Hosted in 2014.
Edinburgh University Ballroom Dance Society (EUBS)	University of Edinburgh	United Kingdom	Participating university.
E.S.D.V. Footloose	Eindhoven University of Technology	Netherlands	Hosted in 1995 (autumn), 1997, 2002, 2006, 2011.
D.S.V. 4 happy feet	University of Twente	Netherlands	Hosted in 2005, 2012, 2013, 2022, 2024. Set to host in 2026.
Unitanz Erlangen	University of Erlangen–Nuremberg	Germany	Participating university.
ETDSKasselTeam	University of Kassel	Germany	Participating university.
Unitanz Frankfurt	Goethe University Frankfurt, Frankfurt University of Applied Sciences	Germany	Inactive team.
Hochschule Geisenheim	Geisenheim Grape Breeding Institute	Germany	Joined in 1994.
Gießen	University of Giessen	Germany	Inactive team.
Unitanz Göttingen	University of Göttingen	Germany	Inactive team.
SSV The Blue Toes	University of Groningen	Netherlands	Hosted in 1998, 2001, 2009, 2019.
Unitanz Hannover	Leibniz University Hannover	Germany	Participating university.
Unitanz Hildesheim	University of Hildesheim	Germany	Inactive team.
Hull	University of Hull	United Kingdom	Inactive team.
Imperial College Dance Club	Imperial College London	United Kingdom	Participating university.
Unitanz Kaiserslautern	Technical University of Kaiserslautern	Germany	Hosted in 1994, 2008, 2009, 2011, 2015, 2017.
Unitanz Karlsruhe	Karlsruhe Institute of Technology	Germany	Participating university.
Unitanz Kiel	Kiel University	Germany	Hosted in 1990, 1991, 1994, 1999, 2003, 2008, 2010, 2014, 2018.
Koln/Cologne	N/A	Germany	
S.D.A. Leidance	Leiden University	Netherlands	Participating university.
Unitanz Leipzig	Leipzig University	Germany	Joined in 1995.
Liverpool Ballroom and Latin Society	University of Liverpool	United Kingdom	
London Dancesport	University of London	United Kingdom	Participating university.
Lublin	N/A	Poland	Participates under another university.
M.S.D.V. Let's Dance	Maastricht University	Netherlands	Participating university.
Unitanz Mainz	University of Mainz	Germany	Joined in 1994.
Unitanz Marburg	Marburg University	Germany	Joined after 1992.
Unitanz Munich	LMU Munich, Munich University of Applied Sciences	Germany	Participating university.
Unitanz Münster	University of Münster	Germany	Participating university.
42 Confused Scientists	N/A (Formerly Neuss)	Germany	Participating team.
S.D.V.N. Dance Fever	Radboud University Nijmegen	Netherlands	Hosted in 2012.
Oslo	University of Oslo	Norway	Participates under another university, expressed interest but has yet to attend.
Oxford University Dancesport Club	University of Oxford	United Kingdom	Participating university.
Reading University Ballroom & Latin Society (RUBLS)	University of Reading	United Kingdom	Participating university.
Erasmus Dance Society	Erasmus University Rotterdam	Netherlands	Participating university.
Southampton University Ballroom & Latin Dance Society (SUBLDS)	University of Southampton	United Kingdom	Joined in 2005. Hosted in 2024.
Ballroom and Latin American Dancing Society (BALADS)	University of St Andrews	United Kingdom	Participating university.
Unitanz Stuttgart	University of Stuttgart	Germany	Participating university.
Tallinn	Tallinn University	Estonia	Participates under another university.
Tenacious D(ancers)	Formed as a neutral team for individual UK competitors.	United Kingdom	Formed in 2024.
Trondheim	Norwegian University of Science and Technology	Norway	Participates under another university, expressed interest but has yet to attend.
Unitanz Ulm	University of Ulm	Germany	Hosted in 1994, 2000.
U.S.D.V. U Dance	Utrecht University	Netherlands	Hosted in 2016.
WuBDA	Wageningen University & Research	Netherlands	Participating dancing society.
Warwick Latin & Ballroom	University of Warwick	United Kingdom	Participated in the 68th ETDS in Southampton.
Winterthur	N/A	Switzerland	Participates under another university.
York Ballroom and Latin Society (YLBS)	University of York	United Kingdom	Participated in the 68th ETDS in Southampton.
Zürich Tanzquotient	ETH Zurich	Switzerland	Hosted in 2025.

== List of all tournaments ==
List of all ETDS Tournaments
Name	Country	Time	Notes
1st Universitäten-Breitensport-Tanzturnier	Germany, Braunschweig	May 1989	
2nd Universitäten-Breitensport-Tanzturnier	Germany, Kiel	November 1990	
3rd Universitäten-Breitensport-Tanzturnier	Germany, Clausthal-Zellerfield	May 1991	
4th Universitäten-Breitensport-Tanzturnier	Germany, Kiel	December 1991	
5th Universitäten-Breitensport-Tanzturnier	Germany, Clausthal-Zellerfield	April 1992	
9th Universitäten-Breitensport-Tanzturnier	Germany, Berlin	Pentecost, 1993	First ETDS hosted by Berlin, following a "promise" by TU Berlin to do so.
10th Universitäten-Breitensport-Tanzturnier	Germany, Aachen	Autumn, 1993	
11th Universitäten-Breitensport-Tanzturnier	Germany, Ulm	Pentecost, 1994	
12th Universitäten-Breitensport-Tanzturnier	Germany, Kiel	Autumn, 1994	
13th Universitäten-Breitensport-Tanzturnier	Germany, Dortmund	Pentecost, 1995	
14th Internationales Uni-Tanzturnier	Netherlands, Eindhoven	Autumn, 1995	First time the ETDS was hosted outside of Germany.
15th Internationales Uni-Tanzturnier	Germany, Berlin	Pentecost, 1996	
16th Internationales Uni-Tanzturnier	Germany, Clausthal-Zellerfield	Autumn, 1996	
17th Internationales Uni-Tanzturnier	Germany, Aachen	Pentecost, 1997	
18th Internationales Uni-Tanzturnier	Netherlands, Eindhoven	Autumn, 1997	
19th Internationales Uni-Tanzturnier	Netherlands, Groningen	Pentecost, 1998	
20th Internationales Uni-Tanzturnier	Germany, Berlin	Autumn, 1998	
21st Internationales Uni-Tanzturnier	Germany, Kiel	Pentecost, 1999	
22nd Internationales Uni-Tanzturnier	Germany, Clausthal-Zellerfield	Autumn, 1999	
23rd Internationales Uni-Tanzturnier	Germany, Dortmund	Pentecost, 2000	
24th Internationales Uni-Tanzturnier	Germany, Ulm	Autumn, 2000	
25th Internationales Uni-Tanzturnier	Germany, Aachen	Pentecost, 2001	
26th Internationales Uni-Tanzturnier	Netherlands, Groningen	Autumn, 2001	
27th ETDS Eindhoven	Netherlands, Eindhoven	Pentecost, 2002	
28th ETDS Berlin	Germany, Berlin	Autumn, 2002	
29th ETDS Kiel	Germany, Kiel	Pentecost, 2003	
30th ETDS Clausthal-Zellerfeld	Germany, Clausthal-Zellerfield	Autumn, 2003	
31st ETDS Wuppertal	Germany, Wuppertal	Pentecost, 2004	
32nd ETDS Valkenswaard	Netherlands, Valkenswaard	Autumn, 2004	
33rd ETDS Enschede	Netherlands, Enschede	Pentecost, 2005	
34th ETDS Aachen "Red"	Germany, Aachen	Autumn, 2005	
35th ETDS Clausthal "Under the Sea"	Germany, Clausthal-Zellerfield	Pentecost, 2006	
36th ETDS Eindhoven "Thunder and Lightning"	Netherlands, Eindhoven	Autumn, 2006	
37th ETDS Berlin "Bad Taste"	Germany, Berlin	Pentecost, 2007	
38th ETDS Dortmund "Dancing in the 80s"	Germany, Dortmund	Autumn, 2007	
39th ETDS Kiel "Aufgetakelt"	Germany, Kiel	Pentecost, 2008	
40th ETDS Kaiserslautern "Hollywood"	Germany, Kaiserslautern	Autumn, 2008	
41st ETDS Groningen "Once Upon a Time"	Netherlands, Groningen	Pentecost, 2009	
42nd ETDS Kaiserslautern "Winter Wonderland"	Germany, Kaiserslautern	Autumn, 2009	
43rd ETDS Aachen "Pyjama Party"	Germany, Aachen	Pentecost, 2010	
44th ETDS Kiel "Ohne Mottoparty"	Germany, Kiel	Autumn, 2010	
45th ETDS Eindhoven "Come fly with us!"	Netherlands, Eindhoven	Pentecost, 2011	
46th ETDS Kaiserslautern "Carnival of Venice"	Germany, Kaiserslautern	Autumn, 2011	
47th ETDS Enschede (Region Twente) "Game on!"	Netherlands, Enschede	Pentecost, 2012	
48th ETDS Nijmegen "Arabian Nights"	Netherlands, Nijmegen	Autumn, 2012	
49th ETDS Enschede (Region Twente) "Fant'ASIA"	Netherlands, Enschede	Pentecost, 2013	
50th ETDS Clausthal "Walpurgis"	Germany, Clausthal-Zellerfield	Autumn, 2013	
51st ETDS Kiel "Dancing Submarine"	Germany, Kiel	Pentecost, 2014	
52nd ETDS Düsseldorf "Space"	Germany, Düsseldorf	Autumn, 2014	
53rd ETDS Kaiserslautern "Beach Party"	Germany, Kaiserslautern	Pentecost, 2015	
54th ETDS Brno "Dancing Zoo"	Czech Republic, Brno	Autumn, 2015	
55th ETDS Berlin "Die goldenen Zwanziger"	Germany, Berlin	Pentecost, 2016	
56th ETDS Utrecht "High School"	Netherlands, Utrecht	Autumn, 2016	
57th ETDS Aachen "Rock'n'Roll"	Germany, Aachen	Pentecost, 2017	
58th ETDS Kaiserslautern "KISS (Keep it small and simple)"	Germany, Kaiserslautern	Autumn, 2017	
59th ETDS Kiel "Te-Kiel-A"	Germany, Kiel	Pentecost, 2018	
60th ETDS Brno "Movie Night"	Czech Republic, Brno	Autumn, 2018	
61st ETDS Clausthal-Zellerfeld (Seesen) "Magic Forest"	Germany, Seesen	Pentecost, 2019	
62nd ETDS Groningen "The Dancing Dead"	Netherlands, Groningen	Autumn, 2019	
63rd ETDS Enschede "Saturday Morning Cartoons"	Netherlands, Enschede	Pentecost, 2022	
64th ETDS Delft "ETDS 3030: Festival of the Future"	Netherlands, Delft	Autumn, 2022	Originally scheduled for Autumn 2020, rescheduled due to the COVID-19 pandemic.
65th ETDS Amsterdam "Black Light District"	Netherlands, Amsterdam	Pentecost, 2023	Originally scheduled for Pentecost 2021, rescheduled due to the COVID-19 pandemic.
66th ETDS Seesen "Highway to Hell"	Germany, Seesen	Autumn, 2023	
67th ETDS Enschede "Dungeons & Dragons"	Netherlands, Enschede	Pentecost, 2024	
68th ETDS Southampton "Under the Sea"	United Kingdom, Southampton	Autumn, 2024	First ETDS in the UK.
69th ETDS Zurich "Above the Clouds"	Switzerland, Wettingen	Summer, 2025	First ETDS in Switzerland, first consecutive ETDS outside of Germany or the Netherlands.
70th ETDS Aachen "Unleash the Steampunk Dance Machine"	Germany, Monheim am Rhein	Autumn, 2025	
71st ETDS Enschede "Dancing Through Wonderland"	Netherlands, Enschede	Summer, 2026	
72nd ETDS Bath ""	United Kingdom, Bath	Autumn, 2026	
