= Shedinburgh =

Theatrical venue and curated programme

Shedinburgh is a theatrical venue and curated programme originally conceived by British producer Francesca Moody and Scottish playwright and performer Gary McNair during the COVID-19 pandemic when the 2020 Edinburgh Fringe Festival was cancelled. Its name is a pun on Edinburgh, where they live streamed theatre, comedy and music shows from constructed sheds to online audiences.

Since then it has evolved into a live theatrical venue during the Edinburgh Fringe Festival, with some of the curated shows scheduled for a London run.

== History ==
The original concept of Shedinburgh started in 2020 as a pun with only live streamed programming, but in 2025 it debuted at Edinburgh Fringe Festival as a live venue, also with a constructed shed as part of the decor.

== Programs ==
Shedinburgh currently runs a number of artists support programs:

=== Shed Originals ===
As of 2026, Shedinburgh began a programme called Shed Originals when they partnered with theatres around the United Kingdom and Ireland to bring scripts in progress to the stage. The four theatres that participated in 2026 to select writers were the Abbey Theatre in Dublin; Theatr Clwyd in Wales; the Traverse Theatre in Edinburgh and The Lowry in Salford.

=== Shedload of the Future Fund ===
Shedinburgh also awards a number of £5,000 grants to artists making their Edinburgh fringe debut through its Shedinburgh's Shedload of Future fund.
