= Howard of Effingham School =

Secondary school in Effingham

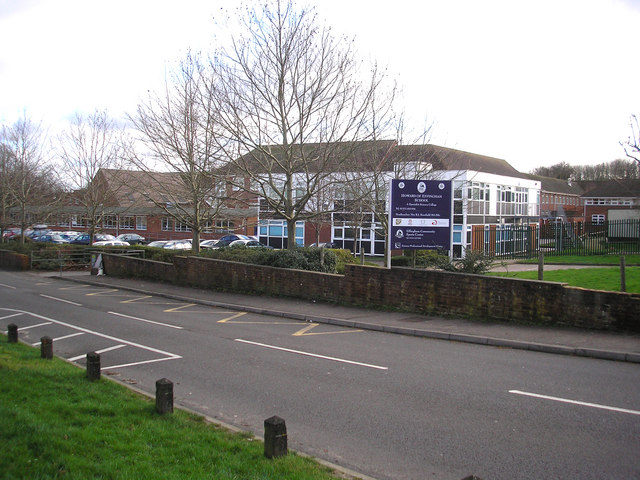

Location
- Lower Road; Effingham, Leatherhead, Surrey, KT24 5JR; England; 51.2732°N 0.3953°W

Information
- Type: Academy
- Motto: Bringing Out The Best
- Established: 1940
- Local authority: Surrey
- Specialist: Science
- Department for Education URN: 136833 Tables
- Ofsted: Reports
- Chair of governors: Sally Williams
- Principal: James Baker
- Executive head: Rhona Barnfield
- Gender: Mixed
- Age: 11 to 18
- Enrolment: 1544
- Houses: Craft, Hawking, Seacole, Turing
- Colours: black and white
- Website: www.thehoward.org

The Howard of Effingham School is a co-educational secondary school and sixth form with academy status. It is located in the village of Effingham, Surrey, to the west of Little Bookham. The school is part of the Howard Partnership Trust, a Multi-Academy Trust which includes four secondary and five primary schools.

The school is named after Charles Howard, the second Baron Howard of Effingham of the Howard Family, who was commander of the English forces during the battles against the Spanish Armada in 1588 and was chiefly responsible after Francis Drake for the victory that saved England from invasion by the Spanish Empire.

The Howard Partnership Trust is currently led by its chief executive officer, Rhona Barnfield CBE, and the school's principal is James Baker who took over from Helen Pennington in September 2021. The school was judged Good in 2019 by Ofsted.

== History ==
The school opened in 1940 and over the years has expanded to include a community sports centre, a purpose-built sixth form block and specialist science facilities which were built after the school was designated as a science college. The school was originally built for 240 pupils but this has now increased to around 1,500.

The school converted to Academy status in 2012 and is now part of the Howard Partnership Trust. The trust includes three other Surrey secondary schools (Thomas Knyvett College, Oxted School and Three Rivers Academy) and four primary schools (Kenyngton Manor Primary School, Cuddington Community Primary School, Eastwick Infant and Eastwick Junior Schools, St Lawrence Primary School) and The Howard Nursery School. Rhona Barnfield, the trust's CEO was appointed a Commander of the Order of the British Empire (CBE) CBE for services to Education in the New Years Honours of 2016.

== Curriculum and academic performance ==
The school curriculum is based on the National Curriculum and the school has achieved notable academic success. In 2015 the school was the 30th most successful comprehensive school in the country for GCSE results according to The Daily Telegraph.

The school's most recent Ofsted inspection in December 2019 found that the school was 'Good' overall with the following breakdown;

- The quality of education - Good
- Behaviour and attitudes - Good
- Personal development - Good
- Leadership and management - Good
- Sixth-form provision Outstanding

The school's previous Ofsted inspection in 2009 (prior to the school changing to Academy status) found that the school was 'Outstanding' overall with the following breakdown;

- Overall effectiveness – Outstanding
- Achievement and standards – Outstanding
- Personal development and well-being – Outstanding
- The quality of provision – Outstanding for 16–19. Good for whole school
- Leadership & management – Outstanding

== Sport ==
The school has achieved some notable successes particularly in rugby union and, unusually for a school in Surrey, in rugby league.

On 5 May 2002, Howard of Effingham's year 8 boys' rugby union team won the Daily Telegraph Emerging Schools National Tournament. They played at the half time interval between the Army and Navy at Twickenham Stadium where they were easy winners and claimed the best year 8 schools rugby team 2002 title.

In August 2012, Howard of Effingham's Year 7 boys' rugby league team became the first team from the south of England to win the Carnegie Champion Schools competition, beating Castleford Academy 24–22.

Some of the school's alumni have achieved success as professional footballers. Probably the most notable is former Crystal Palace and West Ham United player John 'Johnny' Byrne. Byrne was born in West Horsley, Surrey, to Irish immigrants in May 1939. He attended Howard of Effingham in the 1950s and it was a schoolteacher Vincent Blore, himself a former footballer, who encouraged Byrne and alerted Crystal Palace of his talent.

Byrne made his debut for England in 1961 and on 16 May 1964, he memorably scored a hat-trick in Lisbon in England's 4–3 win over a Portugal team that included Eusébio.

In more recent times Conor Gallagher, who attended the school in the 2010s, made his debut for England in a World Cup qualifying match against San Marino on 14 November 2021.

== Notable former pupils ==
- Johnny Byrne, former Crystal Palace, West Ham United and England footballer
- Paul Donovan, economist
- Tom Felton, actor
- Emelia Gorecka, athlete
- Dan Gallagher, footballer
- Conor Gallagher, footballer
- Alex Inglethorpe, former footballer and current Academy Director at Liverpool FC
- Matthew Floyd Jones, musician, writer and performer
- Henry Moodie, musician
- Jonathan R. Scott, former actor
- Kristen Spours, figure skater
- Tom Shanklin, Welsh rugby union player
- Nicholas Talbot, musician

== Print sources ==
- Belton, Brian (2004). Burn Budgie Byrne: Football Inferno. Breedon Books. ISBN 1-85983-392-6.
- Felton, Tom (2023). Beyond the Wand: The Magic and Mayhem of Growing Up a Wizard (Paperback ed.). London: Ebury Spotlight. ISBN 9781529149432.
