= Kimberley Brownlee =

Canadian philosopher

- Born: 1978 (age 47–48)

Education
- Education: Oxford University (DPhil), Cambridge University (MPhil), McGill University (BA)

Philosophical work
- Era: 21st-century philosophy
- Region: Western philosophy
- School: Analytic
- Institutions: University of British Columbia
- Main interests: moral philosophy

Kimberley Brownlee (born 1978) is a Canadian philosopher. She holds a Canada Research Chair in Ethics and Political & Social Philosophy at the University of British Columbia. Previously, she was a Professor of Philosophy at the University of Warwick. She is known for her works on conscience, conviction, civil disobedience, the ethics of sociability, human rights, girls' rights, and antigirlism.

In 2012, Brownlee received the Philip Leverhulme Prize from the Leverhulme Trust. In 2022, she was awarded the Kitty Newman Memorial Award by the Royal Society of Canada.

== Education and career ==
After completing the International Baccalaureate at Lester B. Pearson College, Brownlee received a BA in Philosophy from McGill University in 2001, an MPhil in philosophy from the University of Cambridge in 2002 as a Commonwealth Scholar, and a DPhil in philosophy from the University of Oxford in 2007 as a Rhodes Scholar.

Whilst studying at Oxford, Brownlee competed for the Oxford University Dancesport Club, for which she was awarded a Full Blue in 2006.

She taught at the University of Manchester from 2005 and at the University of Warwick from 2012, becoming Professor of Philosophy there in 2016. In 2020, she took up her current position as Canada Research Chair at the University of British Columbia.

She has been invited to give a number of public lectures including the 2019 Berry Lecture in Public Philosophy at Vanderbilt University, the 2019 Julius Stone Address at the University of Sydney Law School, the 2025 Uehiro Lectures in Practical Ethics at Oxford University, and a 2026 Vancouver Institute Public Lecture.

== Work ==
Brownlee's book Conscience and Conviction: The Case for Civil Disobedience (2012) argues that civil disobedience is undertaken from conscientious moral conviction. Such conviction is characteristically communicative. As a communicative practice that aims to persuade others of the merits of one's cause, civil disobedience is more conscientious than private objection. Under particular circumstances, it can also be more defensible than some forms of legal protest. She wrote the entry on civil disobedience for the Stanford Encyclopedia of Philosophy, later revised with co-author Candice Delmas.

A second area of her work concerns sociability and loneliness. In "A Human Right against Social Deprivation" (Philosophical Quarterly, 2013), she argues that people hold a human right against a sustained lack of decent human contact, a claim developed at length in Being Sure of Each Other: An Essay on Social Rights and Freedoms (2020), which argues that people need not only to receive inclusion and care but to be able to give it. The book considers how such positive social needs impact freedom of association.

More recently, she has written on girls' rights and the ethics of pregnancy and abortion in childhood, with a focus on the concept of antigirlism. She gave the 2025 Uehiro Lectures in Practical Ethics at the University of Oxford on reproductive rights.

== Selected publications ==
=== Books ===
- Being Sure of Each Other: An Essay on Social Rights, Oxford University Press, 2020.
- Conscience and Conviction: The Case for Civil Disobedience, Oxford University Press, 2012.

=== Edited volumes ===
- Engaging Raz, with Andrei Marmor and David Enoch (eds.), Oxford University Press, 2025.
- Being Social: The Philosophy of Social Human Rights, with Adam Neal and David Jenkins (eds.), Oxford University Press, 2022.
- The Blackwell Companion to Applied Philosophy, with Kasper Lippert-Rasmussen and David Coady (eds.), Wiley-Blackwell, 2016.
- Disability and Disadvantage, with Adam Cureton (eds.), Oxford University Press, 2009.

== Media appearances ==
- Talk about Lonely, Shore Films Documentary, released in 2024.
- BBC Newsnight, Loneliness and the COVID-19 Pandemic, March 13, 2020.
- CBC Ideas, Lonely Together: The Plight of Urban Isolation, March 15, 2019.
- Hi-Phi Nation, Season 3, Episode 8, "Uncivil Disobedience", May 25, 2019.
- BBC Ideas, "Do We Have a Right Not to be Lonely?", May 2018.
- Philosophy Bites, Episode on social deprivation, with Nigel Warburton and David Edmonds, August 19, 2015.
