= Kathy and Stella Solve a Murder! =

British musical theatre production

Kathy & Stella Solve a Murder!
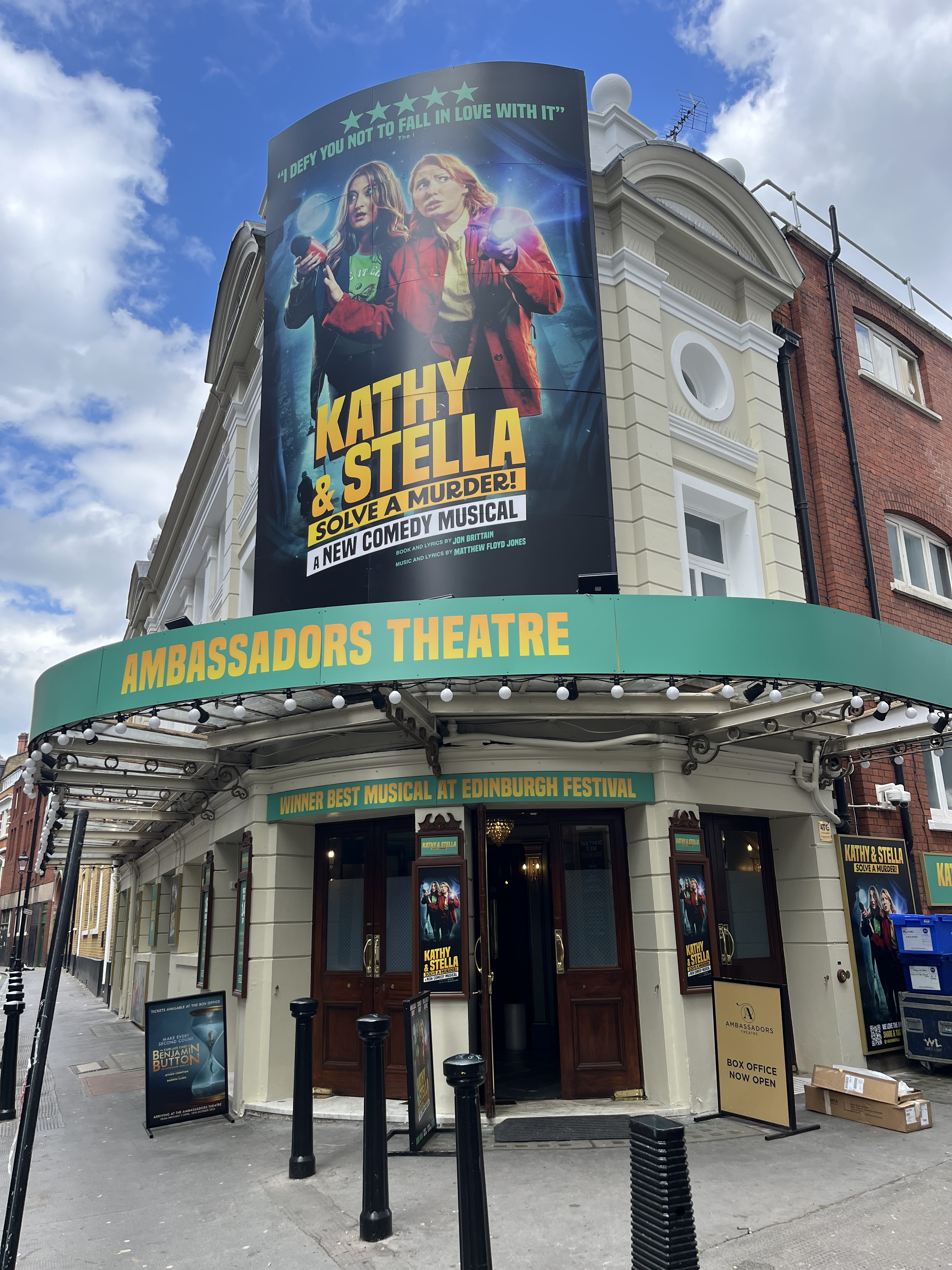
- Kathy & Stella at the Ambassadors
- Music: Matthew Floyd Jones
- Lyrics: Jon Brittain; Matthew Floyd Jones
- Book: Jon Brittain
- Premiere: August 3, 2022: Summerhall, Edinburgh
- Productions: 2022 Edinburgh Fringe; 2023 UK Tour; 2024 West End
- Awards: 2022 Musical Theatre Review Award for Best Musical

Kathy & Stella Solve a Murder! is a murder mystery comedy musical about two true crime podcasters who are thrust into a thrilling whodunnit of their own. The show was written by Jon Brittain (book and lyrics) and Matthew Floyd Jones (music and lyrics), and developed by producer Francesca Moody.

Kathy & Stella opened at the Ambassadors Theatre in London's West End in May 2024.

== Synopsis ==
Kathy and Stella, two murder-obsessed best friends from Beverley near Hull, are the oddball hosts of Kathy & Stella's Murder Podcast, a tiny operation broadcast weekly from the Baxters' garage to the exasperation of their disapproving families. After failing to wow their idol Felicia Taylor at a book signing, their disappointment is soon forgotten when they find themselves in an interrogation room being informed that they are two of the last people to have seen a recent murder victim. Realising that they could both become "part of the story," Kathy and Stella vow to catch the killer themselves, thus beginning a ludicrous caper around Humberside as they realise they don't know what they're doing. Tensions finally come to a head at the Birmingham Convention Centre's Murder Con, a dramatic showdown that puts Kathy and Stella's friendship to the absolute test.

== Roles ==
- Kathy Baxter, library assistant and co-host of Kathy & Stella's Murder Podcast
- Stella Carmichael, her unemployed best friend and co-host
- Felicia Taylor, best-selling true crime author, "the woman who solved the case of the Hull Decapitator"
- Justin Norris and Erica Knott, morgue technicians
- Sue Shaw, detective inspector
- David Slatter, ex-police officer
- Vanessa Baxter, Kathy's mother
- Frankie Carmichael, Stella's sister

== Background ==
Brittain and Jones, who had previously collaborated on the Fringe First Award-winning play A Super Happy Story (About Feeling Super Sad), conceived and wrote Kathy & Stella during the COVID-19 lockdown.

== Production history ==
=== 2022 Edinburgh Fringe ===
Kathy & Stella premiered at Summerhall (Paines Plough) during the 2022 Edinburgh Fringe, produced by Francesca Moody and Kater Gordon, co-directed by Brittain and Fabian Aloise (also choreographer), with musical direction and arrangements by Jones. Other members of the creative team included Cecilia Carey (set and costume), Peter Small (lighting) and Tingying Dong (sound). The show was 70 minutes long, performed in the round by five cast members and the composer on piano.

=== 2023 UK Tour ===
Kathy & Stella was expanded for a 2023 UK tour, returning to the Edinburgh Fringe (Underbelly) with a 90-minute iteration, followed by a two-act version at Bristol Old Vic and HOME Manchester, produced by Moody and Gordon in collaboration with Fiery Angel and Wessex Grove. By this stage the creative team also included Dan Samson (sound), Charlie Ingles (orchestrator and supervisor) and Charlie Martin (associate director), and the company had grown to eight cast members and four musicians. Four songs from the show were released via streaming services.

=== 2024 West End ===
In 2024 it was announced that the full-length version of Kathy & Stella would transfer to the West End, opening at the Ambassadors Theatre on 25 May. On 5 June, during the interval of the press night performance, a water leak occurred backstage that prevented the show from continuing, but performances resumed a few nights later and the show completed its 16-week run on 14 September as intended.

To coincide with the West End opening, the script of Kathy & Stella was published under the Methuen Drama imprint by Bloomsbury Publishing.

== Cast ==
Role	Edinburgh Fringe	UK Tour	West End
Role	2022	2023	2024
Kathy	Bronté Barbé	Bronté Barbé	Bronté Barbé
Stella	Rebekah Hinds	Rebekah Hinds	Rebekah Hinds
Felicia+	Jodie Jacobs	Jodie Jacobs	Hannah-Jane Fox
Sue	Jodie Jacobs	Jodie Jacobs	Elliotte Williams-N'Dure
Vanessa	TJ Lloyd	TJ Lloyd	Elliot Broadfoot
Justin	TJ Lloyd	TJ Lloyd	Elliot Broadfoot
David	TJ Lloyd	TJ Lloyd	Ben Redfern
Frankie	Imelda Warren-Green	Imelda Warren-Green	Imelda Warren-Green
Erica	Imelda Warren-Green	Imelda Warren-Green	Imelda Warren-Green

== Songs ==
West End:

Act I

- Prologue
- Kathy & Stella's Murder Podcast
- We're Gonna Wow Felicia Taylor
- True Crime Famous
- If I Didn't Have You (I Would Die)
- Part of the Story
- Fuck! We Don't Know What We're Doing
- Never Felt So Alive
- True Crime Famous 2
- Everyone's On Our Wavelength *
- The Approval of Strangers
- If I Did It
- Guilty as Sin *

Act II

- Read About a Murder *
- Murder Con
- Can't Trust Anyone ^
- Sue's Song *
- The Show is Over
- We're Gonna Wow Felicia Taylor (Reprise)
- The One Whodunnit
- See You Next Murder

* "Everyone's On Our Wavelength," "Guilty as Sin," "Read About a Murder" and "Sue's Song" were added for the two-act version on the UK Tour.

^ "Can't Trust Anyone" was added for the West End transfer.

== Reception ==
The premiere was hailed as "a night of utter, unalloyed joy" in The i. The Guardian called it "thrilling" and "packed with artistry." "Songs come so thick and fast that you can't afford to miss a line," observed The Scotsman. The production received the 2022 The Stagey Place and Musical Theatre Review Award for Best Musical.

Reviews of the West End production ranged from "bloody good fun with a poignant message" (Radio Times) and "a certified homicidal hoot" (WhatsOnStage), to "Kathy and Stella left me dead inside" (The Evening Standard).
