= Cambridge Dancers' Club =

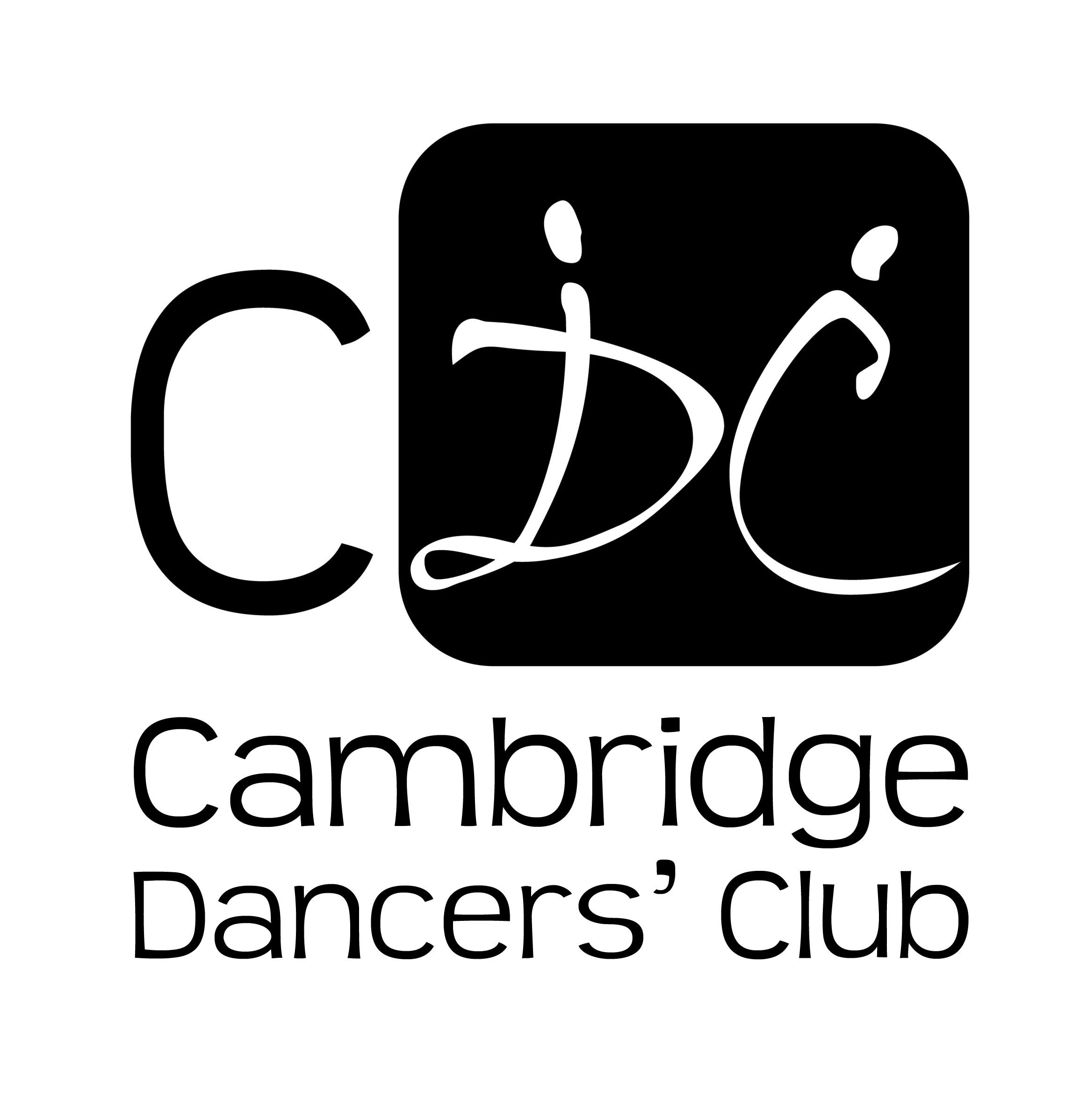
- Cambridge Dancers' Club was founded in October 1950

Cambridge Dancers' Club (CDC) first opened its doors in October 1950 as a student society in the University of Cambridge to promote Ballroom and Latin dancing. It has since broadened the styles taught by their professional teachers to include Salsa and Rock 'n' Roll classes, as well as opening to all adult Cambridge residents. The club runs classes five nights a week during Full Term, including classes open to people with no previous dance experience. Classes also run (albeit less frequently) outside Full Term. Having once had an annual membership of over 2000, the club now has a membership that is still well over 1000 members, making it purportedly one of the largest Ballroom and Latin Dancing Clubs in Europe.

== Cambridge University Dancesport Team (CUDT) ==
Dancesport is the competitive side of Ballroom and Latin dancing. CUDT sends teams of 24 couples to inter-university competitions, most notably the National Inter Varsity Dancesport Competition (IVDC) and an annual varsity match against Oxford. CUDT also supports the development of dancesport at Anglia Ruskin University and will trial any dancers who wish to compete for the team.

Dancesport has held Half-Blue status for women since 1991 and for men since 1999. During this time it was also possible to be awarded a discretionary full blue. In 2013, the women's blues committee upgraded Dancesport's status to Full Blue.

CUDT has been the most successful of the University Dancesport Teams in the last 10 years. It has won the Overall IVDC Championship from 2006-2009 and from 2012-2015. 2014 brought especially notable success with Cambridge emerging victorious in all team matches (A-F) including the unprecedented result of placing their A & B teams first and second respectively. 2015 again saw success, with Cambridge triumphing in all team matches (A-F). CUDT have also won the varsity match with Oxford from 2007-2009 and in 2012-2019.

CUDT also brings along a team of around 40 beginners to competitions, many of whom go on in future years to represent the full team. The Cambridge University Beginners Team has won the best national beginners team in 2008, 2009, 2010, 2012, 2014 and 2015.
