= Theatre503 =

Theatre in Wandsworth, London, England

- The Grace Theatre; The Latchmere Theatre
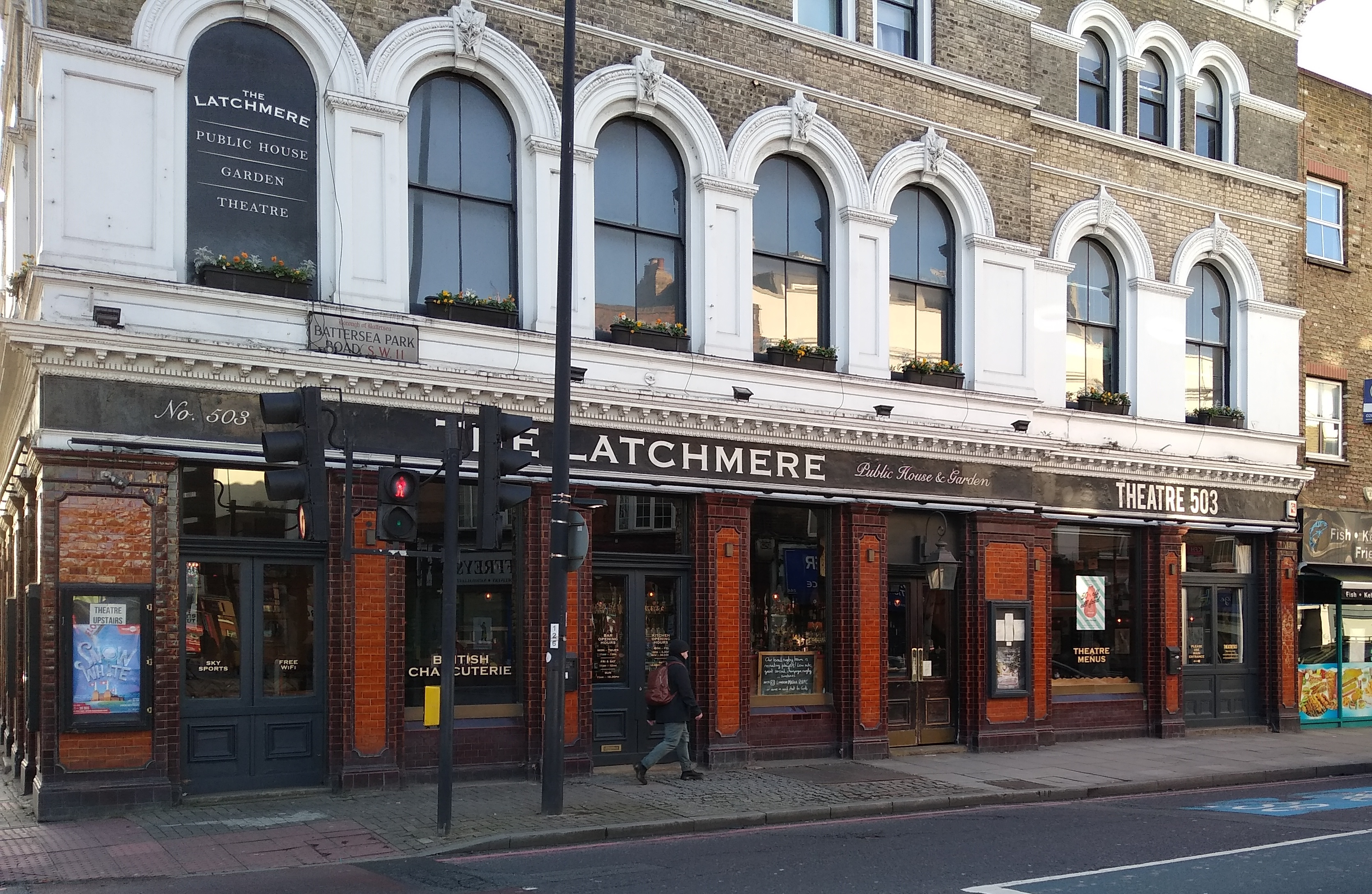
- Theatre503 and Latchmere Pub
- Interactive map of Theatre503
- Address: 503 Battersea Park Road; London, SW11; United Kingdom
- Coordinates: 51.4746°N 0.1542°W
- Capacity: 64 seats
- Type: Fringe theatre
- Current use: Theatre
- Production: New writing
- Public transit: Clapham Junction

Construction
- Opened: 1982; 44 years ago

Website
- theatre503.com

Theatre503 is a theatre based at 503 Battersea Park Road in Battersea in the London Borough of Wandsworth, above The Latchmere pub. The venue is known for promoting the work of new writers and is one of the most important new writing theatres in the United Kingdom.

== History ==
The theatre was founded in 1982 as the Latchmere Theatre (the name taken from that of the pub downstairs), an offshoot of the Gate Theatre, Notting Hill Gate. It is a studio theatre. The opening production was an adaptation of Fear and Loathing in Las Vegas, which proved so successful that the production transferred to the West End.

In 2004, the theatre was renamed as Theatre503. Under that name, the venue saw the premiere of works by writers including Duncan Macmillan, Tom Morton-Smith, Anna Jordan, Alice Birch, Charlene James, Katori Hall, Jon Brittain, and Phoebe Eclair-Powell. It has won the Peter Brook Empty Space Award and two Olivier Awards: in 2010 for its production of Katori Hall's The Mountaintop and in 2017 for Rotterdam by Jon Brittain.

Over 120 debut and emerging writers are staged each year in more than 70 productions, ranging from one-night series of short plays to full-length four-week runs. In a two-year cycle, the theatre reads and receives over 4,000 scripts, including through their biennial International Playwriting Award, the 503Five writers-in-residence scheme, unsolicited submissions, and their Rapid Write Response programme.

== Writers' Programme ==
Theatre503's Writers' Programme supports emerging playwrights at all stages of their careers through a range of courses, masterclasses, intensives and development schemes. It is facilitated by industry leaders including Theatre503 alumni and team members, and offers a mix of in-person and online sessions.

=== 503Five ===
The 503Five is an 18-month writers-in-residence scheme, supported by Philip Carne MBE and Christine Carne and the Orseis Trust. It offers writers a seed commission of £2,000, masterclass workshops, peer-to-peer support, industry connections, dramaturgical support, and opportunities for research and development and rehearsed readings. The scheme is designed for UK-based writers who have developed their craft to a high standard but are not yet professionally produced.

503Five alumni include Jon Brittain (Rotterdam, Olivier Award winner), Charlene James (George Devine Award winner for Cuttin' It), Vinay Patel (BAFTA-winning writer of Murdered by My Father), Yasmin Joseph (James Tait Black Prize winner, J'Ouvert), Benedict Lombe (Susan Smith Blackburn Prize winner, Lava), Ross Willis (Writers' Guild Award winner, Wolfie), Tyrell Williams (George Devine Award winner, Red Pitch), Asa Haynes, Rex Obano, Brad Birch, Beth Steel, Joel Tan, and Mahad Ali, among others.

=== Rapid Write Response ===
Rapid Write Response (RWR) is Theatre503's short play initiative for early-career writers and directors. Writers are invited to create a ten-minute short play in response to the current full-length production on stage. Over a three-week period, plays are written, selected, cast, rehearsed and staged, co-ordinated by the theatre's Deputy Artistic Director. Six to seven plays are selected per RWR event, each paired with a director.

The programme has been a significant launch pad for writers and directors. Anna Jordan's Yen subsequently transferred to the Royal Exchange Manchester, the Royal Court Theatre and Broadway. Vinay Patel participated before writing the BAFTA award-winning Murdered by My Father. John Webber's Spiderfly, which began as a Rapid Write Response, was developed into a full-length play and programmed in Theatre503's 2019 Autumn Season. Yasmin Joseph met director Rebekah Murrell through a Rapid Write Response; the two went on to form production company Bad Breed and stage Joseph's play J'Ouvert at Theatre503 in 2019 and at the Harold Pinter Theatre in the West End in 2021.

==== History of Rapid Write Response productions ====
The following table lists Rapid Write Response productions with their contributing writers and directors where records are available.

Date	In response to	Writer(s)	Director(s)	Notes
Mar 2019	There is a Field (Martin Askew)	Martin Edwards, Brian Eley, Ross Forder, James Gourlay, Leila Nashef, Sarah Teale, Lydia Thomson	Danielle Baker, Tian Brown-Sampson, Olivia Darnley, Mumba Dodwell, Cory Haas, Jack Nurse, Frances Anne Rafferty	
Apr 2019	Wolfie (Ross Willis)	Marcus Bernard, Grace Carroll, Emma Griffiths, Rebecca Jean-Carroll, Audrey Lang, Tim McNiven, Tom Mellors		
Jun 2019	J'Ouvert (Yasmin Joseph)	Yasmine Lever, Hassan Govia, James Reynolds, Martin Edwards, Nicola Latchana, Adanna Oji, Ekene Okobi		
Nov 2019	Spiderfly (John Webber)			Spiderfly itself began as a Rapid Write Response
Dec 2019	The Fairytale Revolution (Panto, curated by Jon Brittain)	Conor Powell, Kelly Jones, Katie Redford, Vicky Richards, Rosie Bilton, Isabelle Kassam, Momo Hansch		
Mar 2020	MEAT (Gillian Greer)	Natalie Mackinnon (Claws), Dan Sareen (Reunion), Isabelle Kassam (Bones), Geraldine Lang (Roadkill), Anna Clart (The Basics), Gemma Lawrence (Straight Vodka), Callan Rose McCarthy (So I Bled)	Laura Clifford, Helena Snider, Will Jackson, Jessica Mensah, Gavin Joseph, Gemma Lawrence, Yusuf Niazi	Curator: Darren Sinnott
Apr 2020	Paper Cut (Andrew Rosendorf)			Held digitally via Zoom due to COVID-19
Oct 2021	Foxes (Dexter Flanders)	Shanika Warren-Markland (Sparkle Eyes), Rosalind Adler (The Living Garment of God), Frances Eva Lea (Cake), Glenda Cooper (Father's Day), Hannah Shury-Smith (Rock, Paper, Scissors), Victoria Barber (Anticlimax)		Curator: Jade Lewis
Nov 2021	Out of Sorts (Danusia Samal)	Ali Ackland-Snow (Crossing Wires), Lydia Sabatini (Mouthful), Anna Pellegrini (Goldfish), Roli Okorodudu (Blend. Share. Mix), Ruth D'Silva (Caught), Adenike Ojo (Soupcase), Chloe Yates (Change The World)	Ajjaz Awad Ibrahim, Henry C Kremples, Janisè Sadik, Garen Abel Unokan, Robyn Hoedemaker, Anne-Christelle Zanzen, Yusuf Niazi	
Jan 2023	The Boy at the Back of the Class (TBAK)	Pooja Sivaraman (Lady Lessons), Ramsey Hassan (Man on Bike Made by God), Olivia Gibbs-Fairley (Shed), Misha Graham Patel (Tammy and Erica), Jack Albert Cook (Expecting Promotion), Joey Ellis	Ariella Stoian, Raimu Iftum, Klara Kaliger, Beth Drury, Rebeka Dio, Rasheka Christie	Curated by Julian Bruton
Mar 2023	Stray Dogs			
Jul 2023	Agatha (Florence Howard)			
Mar 2024	Bungalow			
Dec 2024	by their fruits (dkfash)	Tom Draper (and), Juliana Lisk (choices), Rachel Oyawale (church girl), Remi Shorunke-Samuel (firewater), Alice Onwordi (swedish meatballs), Iman Boujelouah (their threads)	Jordi M. Carter, Dubheasa Lanipekun, Llyrio Boateng, Christine Ubochi, Elena Yianni, Eileen Gbagbo	Curated by Rochelle Wilson

== International Playwriting Award ==
Theatre503's International Playwriting Award is held biennially and is open to unproduced writers worldwide. Winners receive a full production at Theatre503.

=== Winners ===
- 2014: Bea Roberts – And Then Come the Nightjars and Paul Murphy – Valhalla
- 2016: Andrew Thompson – In Event of Moone Disaster
- 2018: Danusia Samal – Out of Sorts
- 2020: Pravin Wilkins – Moreno
- 2023: Roxy Cook – A Woman Walks into a Bank

== Awards ==
=== 2020 ===
- Writers Guild Award, Best New Play (Ross Willis for Wolfie)

=== 2019 ===
- Offie, Best New Play (Ross Willis for Wolfie)

=== 2018 ===
- Offie, Best New Play (Tearrance Arvelle Chisholm for Br'er Cotton)
- Stage Debut Award, Best Writer (Andrew Thompson)

=== 2017 ===
- Olivier Awards, Outstanding Achievement in an Affiliate Theatre – Rotterdam by Jon Brittain (premiered at Theatre503 in 2015 before transferring to Trafalgar Studios)

=== 2016 ===
- Offie, Best Producer (DEM Productions at Theatre503)

=== 2014 ===
- Argus Angel for Artistic Excellence (Margaret Thatcher Queen of Soho)
- Offie, Best Set Designer (Signe Beckmann for A Handful of Stars)

=== 2011 ===
- Offie:
- Most Welcoming Theatre
- Best New Musical (Porn – The Musical)
- People's Choice Best Female Performance (Jessie Cave for Breed)
- Off West End Adopt A Playwright Competition – Sarah Grochala

=== 2010 ===
Winner – Olivier Awards, Best New Play, The Mountaintop by Katori Hall

=== 2009 ===
- Meyer Whitworth Award, Ali Taylor for Cotton Wool

== Productions ==
Landmark productions at Theatre503 include:

- Wolfie by Ross Willis
- J'Ouvert by Yasmin Joseph
- Br'er Cotton by Tearrance Arvelle Chisholm
- In Event of Moone Disaster by Andrew Thompson
- Rotterdam by Jon Brittain
- A Handful of Stars by Billy Roche
- Land of Our Fathers by Chris Urch
- Margaret Thatcher Queen of Soho by Jon Brittain and Matt Tedford
- The Mountaintop by Katori Hall
- Salt Meets Wound by Tom Morton-Smith

== See also ==
- Harold Pinter Theatre
- Gate Theatre (London)
- Fringe theatre
- New writing (theatre)
