= Baz Bamigboye =

British journalist

- Born: Baz Bamigboye; 17 September 1957 (age 68); Surrey
- Occupation: Gossip columnist

Baz Bamigboye (born 17 September 1957) is a British gossip columnist and entertainments writer for Deadline Hollywood and formerly the Daily Mail group of newspapers.

== Life ==
Born in Surrey, and raised in Richmond Upon Thames, Bamigboye is Nigerian British. His father, Bamidele Bamigboye, was installed as the Oba - under the regnal name Bamigboye II - of Iresi, Nigeria, in 1983.

He began his career in journalism working on a local newspaper in Kingston-upon-Thames, Surrey. He has been mentioned in other British publications (e.g., The Guardian, The Daily Telegraph, and the BBC). He received the Showbusiness Reporter of the Year award at the British Press Awards in 2003.

In February 2022, Bamigboye announced that he would be leaving the Daily Mail to join Deadline Hollywood.

His TV appearances have included Have I Got News for You, Club Mix on Channel 4, The James Whale Radio Show on ITV, Jack and Baz on BSkyB, and appearances on US TV.
