= Francesca Moody =

British theatrical producer

- Born: December 21, 1987 (age 38); London, England
- Education: University of Exeter; Royal Welsh College of Music and Drama
- Occupation: Producer

Francesca Moody MBE is a British theatrical producer best known for bringing the theatrical versions of Fleabag and Baby Reindeer, both of which were adapted into television series, to the Edinburgh Festival Fringe. She also produced the 2022 musical Kathy and Stella Solve a Murder! and the 2024 play Weather Girl.

Moody has been described as a "Fringe super-producer" by The Guardian, and her reputation has led audiences, performers, and critics to specifically seek out her shows at the Edinburgh Fringe. She describes herself as "finding unusual, kooky, sometimes auteur-led work that doesn't always immediately feel commercial".

== Career ==
Moody was born in London. She studied drama at the University of Exeter and earned a Master's in acting from the Royal Welsh College of Music & Drama. She attended the Edinburgh Festival Fringe at the age of 17 as an intern for a small production company. The exposure to new theatrical forms helped inspire her career as a producer. Early in her career, Moody worked part time in front of house of the Royal Opera House while producing theatre on the side.

Moody produced her first Fringe show at the request of her actor friend Alex Waldmann, whose show led her to produce additional shows. After seeing Phoebe Waller-Bridge perform a 10 minute comedy set, Moody insisted on expanding Waller-Bridge's act into a full-length play, which debuted at the 2013 Edinburgh Fringe Festival and later moved to London and South Korea before becoming the television show Fleabag.

As producer, Moody shapes many aspects of a show from plot to visual appearance. She told The Guardian, "In a world that seems to be increasingly obsessed by star-led revivals or existing bits of adapted IP, you have to make a show feel like its own bit of original IP".

Moody created Shedinburgh, a venue at the Edinburgh Fringe Festival that curates a variety of comedy and drama shows. To expand access to the festival, the Shedinburgh supports its performers financially by paying their travel costs.
