= Full Term =

Calendar used by Oxford University and Cambridge University

Full Term in the universities of Oxford and Cambridge refers to the eight weeks within the longer academic term, during which lectures are given and students are required to be in residence. The dates of Full Term may differ from year to year within the fixed dates of the whole term (simply, but ambiguously, referred to as "Term" with a capital, or occasionally "statutory term").

In Oxford, each week is numbered from First Week to Eighth Week, beginning on Sunday and ending on Saturday. The week preceding Full Term is called 'Noughth Week' (sometimes written 0th Week).
