= Rotterdam (play) =

Play by Jon Brittain

Rotterdam is a play by British playwright Jon Brittain. Rotterdam premiered at south London's Theatre 503 in November 2015. The production transferred to the Trafalgar Studios in July 2016. The production then transferred to the Arts Theatre for a limited run from 21 June to 15 July 2017

The play deals with transgender relationships, gender, and sexuality.

It was named Outstanding Achievement in an Affiliate Theatre at the 2017 Olivier Awards.
