= Matthew Floyd Jones =

British musician, writer and performer

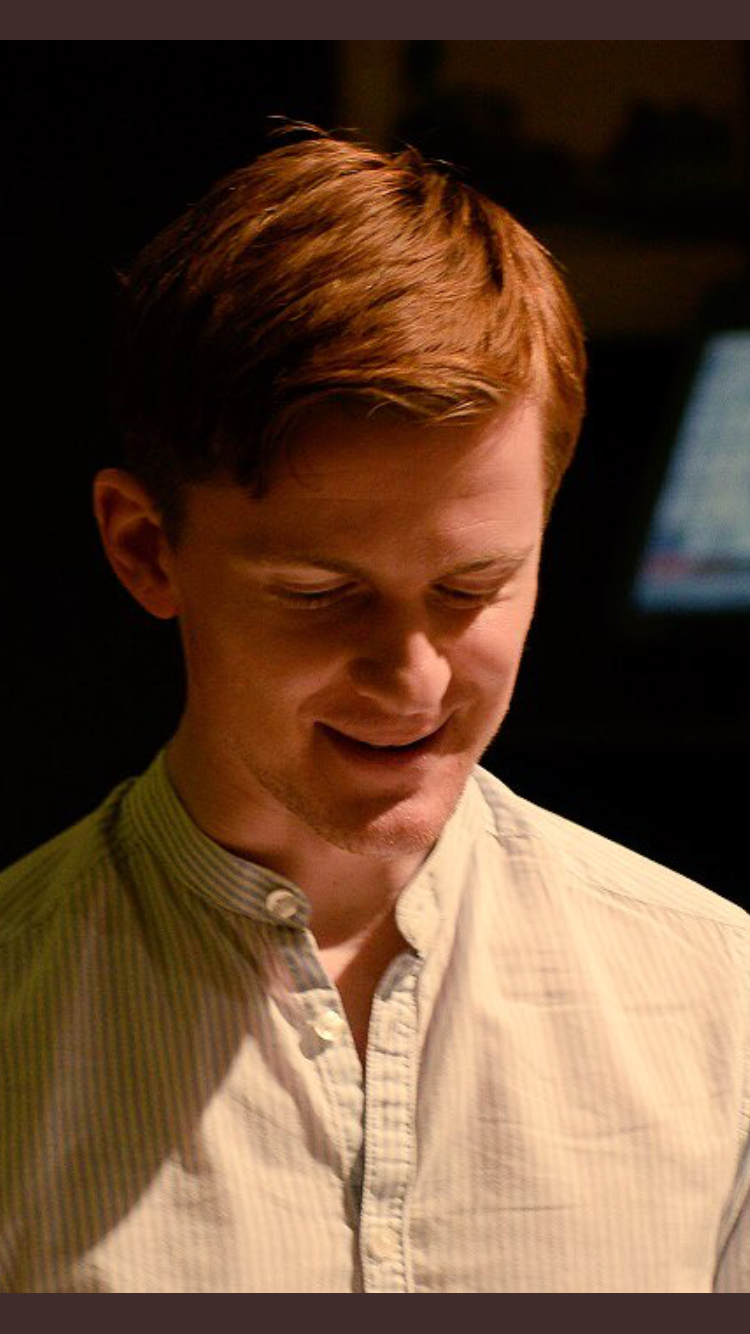
- Born: 1985 (age 40–41); Kingston upon Thames, Greater London, England
- Education: University of Oxford (Lady Margaret Hall)
- Occupations: Musician; Writer; Performer
- Years active: 2008-present

Matthew Floyd Jones is a musician, writer and performer. He is known for his work in the musical comedy double act Frisky & Mannish, formed in 2008, and for composing the score of the West End musical Kathy and Stella Solve a Murder!, which was presented at the Ambassadors Theatre, London in 2024.

Jones attended Howard of Effingham School and is an Oxford alumnus with a degree in Classics and English literature; whilst studying he competed for the Oxford University Dancesport Club, winning two varsity matches and a Full Blue, and wrote songs for The Oxford Revue.

He appeared in Camera Lucida at the Barbican Centre, which won the Samuel Beckett Award in 2014, and played George in the London Hippodrome production of Miss Nightingale.
