= Oxford University Dancesport Club =

Largest sports club of Oxford University

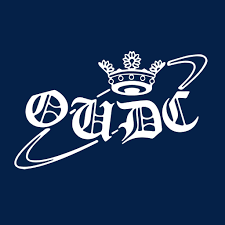
- Founded: 1968 (as Oxford Ballroom Dance Club)
- Based in: Oxford, England
- Website: www.oudancesport.co.uk

Oxford University Dancesport Club (OUDC) is Oxford University's largest sports club and is the second largest club at the university after the Oxford Union. Founded in 1968 it currently has an annual membership of around 800 members. It runs professionally taught classes in the following dance styles:

- Ballroom
- Latin American
- Salsa
- Argentine Tango
- Bachata
- Rock’n’Roll
- Zumba

Its classes are open to all (including non-university members) and cater to all levels of experience. The Club also runs occasional workshops and a weekly social dance on Sundays in full term and on some Sundays out of term.

== History ==
Prior to the establishment of the Oxford Ballroom Dancing Club (OBDC), (later OUBDC and still later OUDC) undergraduates at the University of Oxford were not allowed to attend the popular Brett's dancing school in the centre of Oxford, nor attend any public dance at the Carfax Assembly Rooms, Headington Hill Hall or Town Hall. Private dancing lessons were also not permitted. In a bid to provide students at the university with an opportunity to dance a meeting was held on Wednesday 8 May 1968 at the Iffley Road Stadium for all those interested in forming a ballroom dancing club. This first meeting was attended by just over 50 people.

The Club's first coach was Anne O’Hagan, assisted by Lexa Duckett, with the Club's first Senior Member, Dr. Acheson, and his wife helping out where possible. The Club received its University accreditation in 1969 and by 1971 had 143 members. Initially it was a purely social dancing club – it was only later that it started running medals examinations and competitions. The first competition in Oxford was held at Rhodes House on 8 March 1974. The competition was against Cambridge and Oxford won the competition by 106.5pts to 106pts. The judges were the Tanakas, an eminent ballroom dance couple who represented Japan. The two teams have been rivals ever since. Oxford won its first Inter Varsity Dance Competition in 1980, a year after Cambridge won their first such competition. The Club was awarded Full Blue status for women in 1997 and discretionary Full Blue status for men in 2003.

== Team ==
The Club's Main Team is one of the most successful university dancesport teams in the country. The Team, which usually consists of 24 couples, competes at a number of university circuit dancesport competitions during the year, including the Inter Varsity Dance Competition (IVDC) and is the reigning Inter Varsity Dance champion. In 2004 and again in 2006 it won the Intercontinental Dance Festival team match competition, a title it still holds as the competition has not been run since that date.

Each year the Team competes in a Varsity dancesport competition against Cambridge . This consists of an A-Team match, a B-Team match, a Beginners Team match and a variety of other open events. Oxford and Cambridge take it in turns to host the event. Both the A-Team (Varsity) match and the B-Team (Challenge Shield) match are contested by 9 couples from each university. Each University splits its nine couples into three groups of three couples. Each of these groups of three couples then dances against each of the three groups from the other university in each of the four dances (waltz, quickstep, cha and jive). The results from each of these nine group-to-group matches for each of the four dances are then added together to determine the winning team. The Varsity and Challenge Shield match format is extremely unusual as it requires dancers to be good at both ballroom and Latin American style dances.

== Coaches ==
=== Bruce Richardson ===
Bruce Richardson is the Club's Head Coach. As such he has ultimate responsibility for all coaching within the Club (including the employment of other coaching staff) and for all trials and selections for the Team and Beginners Team. Bruce, who was trained by ballroom dancer Guy Howard (author of the IDTA Ballroom Technique book), has been the Club's ballroom coach for many years and has a considerable record of success in university dancesport. Teams selected by Bruce have been victorious at the Inter Varsity Dance Competition on 11 occasions in his 40 years of head coach. In 2009 he reached the shortlist of three for the Ballroom, Latin and Sequence Teachers Award at the Carl Alan Awards after being nominated by his peers in recognition of the longevity of his coaching.

== Former coaches ==
Former coaches include Ian Waite.

OUDC have employed many prestigious dancers to coach over the years, as well as numerous workshops with top professionals.

== Cuppers ==
The Club runs an annual inter-college dancesport competition called Cuppers. Colleges enter teams of four couples. Each couple performs one of four dances: waltz, quickstep, cha and jive. The highest scoring team wins their college the Acheson Shield. The College with the most points overall across all of the teams they enter takes home the Rob Stevens Memorial Cup. The rules of the competition require that at least one member of each partnership must be an ‘inexperienced dancer’. Hence, the success of a college depends as much on the beginners it recruits as on its established dancers.

== Blues recipients ==
Year	Men's blues recipient(s)	Women's blues recipient(s)
2015/16	Tadas Temcinas (St Anne's)	Jessica Quirke (Exeter)
2012/13	Alex Clibbon (St Catherine's); George Economides (St Peter's)	Zoe Kelly (Queen's); Varvara Mystaka (Worcester)
2011/12	Alex Clibbon (St Catherine's); Oliver Zeldin (St Cross)	Elizabeth Clifton (University)
2010/11	Alex Clibbon (St Catherine's); Ivans Lubenko (Wadham)	Haibo E (Corpus Christi); Sarah Farrell (St John's); Helen Pearce (Keble)
2009/10	Melvin Chen (Mansfield)	Patricia Waszczuk (Lincoln)
2008/09	Peter Kecskemethy (Merton); Alexander Robinson (Worcester)	Helen Pearce (Keble); Annemarie Wait (Merton)
2007/08	William Lee (St Anthony's); Ivans Lubenko (Keble)	Sarah Farrell (St John's); Helen Pearce (Keble); Pippa Underwood (Exeter); Charlotte Woolley (Keble)
2006/07	Matthew Jones (Lady Margaret Hall); Christoph Ortner (Oriel)	Sarah Farrell (St John's); Pippa Underwood (Exeter); Sarah Ward Jones (St John's)
2005/06	Sugata Kaviraj (St Catherine's); Okezika Uhiara (Christ Church)	Kimberley Brownlee; Alice Pocklington (Queen's); Camilla Sen (St Hugh's); Pippa Underwood (Exeter)
2004/05	Nicholas Faull (Trinity, Extraordinary Blue); Sugata Kaviraj (St Catherine's); Robin Schlinkert (Queen's)	Camilla Sen (St Hugh's); Ju Min Wong (Brasenose); Claire Wrathmell (Trinity); Andrea Zitna (New)
2003/04	Nicholas Faull (Trinity); Peter Nixey (Green)	Hazel Crow (Hertford); Cecile Defosse (Queen's); Harriet Smith (St John's)
2002/03	Nicholas Faull (Trinity); Peter Nixey (Green)	Hazel Crow (Hertford); Jane Higgins (Lincoln); Harriet Smith (St John's)
2001/02	Nick Connolly (Wolfson)†; Sebastien Marcelin-Rice (Exeter)†	Ju Min Wong (St Peter's)
2000/01		Penny Leech (Hertford), Caroline Parler (Queen's), Ju Min Wong (St Peter's)
1999/2000		Penny Leech (Hertford)

† Pre-2002 Men's Extraordinary Blues

== Results ==
=== Inter Varsity Dance Competition ===
Year	A Team	Overall
2018	27th	??
2017	3rd	2nd
2016	2nd	
2015	13th (joint)	3rd
2014	9th	2nd
2013	1st	2nd
2012	2nd	
2011	1st	
2010	1st	
2009	2nd	3rd
2008	2nd	
2007	2nd	
2006	2nd	
2005	2nd	1st
2004	1st	
2003	1st (joint)	1st
2002	1st	
2001	1st	
2000	2nd	1st

=== Oxford Cambridge Dancesport Varsity match ===
Year	A Team (Varsity match)	B Team (Challenge match)
2018	Cambridge	NA
2017	Cambridge	
2016	Cambridge	
2015	Cambridge	
2014	Cambridge	
2013	Cambridge	
2012	Cambridge	
2011	Oxford	Cambridge
2010	Oxford	
2009	Cambridge	
2008	Cambridge	
2007	Cambridge	
2006	Oxford	
2005	Oxford	
2004	Oxford	
2003	Oxford	
2002	Oxford	
2001	Oxford	
2000	Oxford	

A Team

Year	Best Oxford ballroom couple	Best Oxford Latin couple	Best Oxford couple
2017	Tadas Temcinas & Jessica Quirke		
2016	Tadas Temcinas & Jessica Quirke		
2015	Nick Li & Emily Sargeant (+)	Tadas Temcinas & Anique Kruger	Marek Buchman & Anna Schaupp
2014	Marek Buchman & Anna Schaupp		
2013	Marek Buchman & Zoe Kelly (+)	Alex Clibbon & Anna Schaupp	Marek Buchman & Zoe Kelly
2012	Marek Buchman & Zoe Kelly; Nick Li & Sarah Glatte (+)	Ivan Lubenko & Helen Pearce (+)	
2011	Oliver Zeldin & Haibo E (+)	Ivan Lubenko & Helen Pearce (+)	
2010	Oliver Zeldin & Marja Verbon (+)	Peter Kecskemethy & Sarah Farrell (+)	Ivan Lubenko & Helen Pearce (+)
2009	Oliver Zeldin & Marja Verbon (+)	William Lee & Sarah Farrell (+)	
2008	Ian Preston & Charlotte Woolley	Ivan Lubenko & Pippa Underwood	
2007	Ian Preston & Charlotte Woolley	Ozzie Uhiara & Sarah Farrell	
2006	Sugata Kaviraj & Alice Pocklington (+)	Matthew Jones & Pippa Underwood (+)	Sugata Kaviraj & Alice Pocklington (+)
2005	Sugata Kaviraj & Andrea Zitna; Nicholas Faull & Ju Min Wong (joint) (+)	Nicholas Faull & Ju Min Wong (+)	

Year	Best Newcomer	Black Horse Trophy
2015	Tadas Temcinas & Anique Kruger (+)	Marcin Sliwa & Paige Gibbons
2014	Marcin Sliwa & Claire Barnett	Patrick Penzo & Katherine MacArthur
2013	Gahn Pakorn Aiewsakun & Veronika Kasparova (+)	Alex Field & Hristiana Vidinova
2012	Marek Buchman & Zoe Kelly (+)	Cedric Tan & Annie Ng
2011	Hsueh Qu & Sarah Glatte (+)	Charlie Byers & Amanda Unsworth
2010	Melvin Chen & Patricia Waszczuk (+)	Alex Grey & Tamasin Graham
2009	Joseph Chedrawe & Ginger Turner (+)	Owen Chang & Joanna Bagniewska
2008	Oliver Zeldin & Francesca Barrow	Mark Penwill & Wanzhen Tang
2007	Ian Preston & Charlotte Woolley; Alex Grey & Tamasin Graham	Alex Robinson & Mairi McGuiness
2006	Joseph Coulson & Ruth Westcott (+)	William Chao & Sarah Ward-Jones
2005	Christoph Ortner & Kimberley Brownlee	Ozekia Uhiara & Marianna Ofosu
2004	Ian Watson & Cécile Défossé	
2003	Wolfram Schmitt & Emmy Spencer	
2002	David Weston & Georgina Weeds	
2001	Nick Faull & Erica Witherington	

(+) indicates that this couple was also best overall across Oxford and Cambridge in their respective category.

B Team

Year	Best Oxford ballroom couple	Best Oxford Latin couple	Best Oxford couple
2015	Christoph Weis & Pola Orlowska	Dan Claff & Joanna Rachel Bell	Christoph Weis & Pola Orlowska
2014	Dan Claff & Alexandra Damgaard	Dean Thirlwell & Madeline Day Price	Dan Claff & Alexandra Damgaard
2013	Artem Kadikov & Alice Clifford	Dean Thirlwell & Colleen Curran	
2012	Luke Lishman & Harriet Czernobay	Dean Thirlwell & Colleen Curran	Luke Lishman & Harriet Czernobay
2011	Tom Perry & Wanzhen Tang (+)	Tom Perry & Wanzhen Tang	Tom Perry & Wanzhen Tang (+)
2010	Owen Chang & Joanna Bagniewska	Joseph Chedrawe & Ginger Turner (+)	Tom Perry & Wanzhen Tang
2009	Paul Dwyer & Haibo E (+)	Nick Haines & Erin Lane	Luke Johnson & Amanda Unsworth (+)
2008			
2007	Martin Bird & Vicky Stimson (+)	Martin Bird & Vicky Stimson	Martin Bird & Vicky Stimson (+)
2006	Ian Preston & Charlotte Wooley	Bilal Khan & Alice Pillar	Damien Vukcevic & Parvy Vis-Nathan
2005	Alex Hobbs & Karen Zieger	Alex Hobbs & Karen Zieger (+)	

=== Acheson Shield ===
Year	College
2015	Magdalen College
2014	Keble College
2013	Keble College
2012	Keble College
2011	Keble College
2010	Worcester College
2009	Hertford College
2008	Keble College
2007	Keble College
2006	Trinity College
2005	Trinity College
2004	Keble College
2003	Keble College
2002	St. Hugh's College
2001	Merton College
2000	Merton College

=== Rob Stevens Memorial Trophy ===
This trophy was awarded for the first time in 2010.

Year	College
2014	Trinity College
2013	Keble College
2012	Keble College
2011	Wadham College
2010	Keble College
