= Nancy Diuguid =

American theatre director

Nancy Diuguid (18 October 1948 – 21 May 2003) was an American theater director, who lived and worked in England and South Africa.

== Early life and education ==
Nancy Elizabeth Diuguid was born in Cincinnati, Ohio. Her parents were Gex Lillard Diuguid, a Carroll Co. tobacco farmer, and Elizabeth Bailey Lineback Diuguid. She attended schools in Ghent and Carrollton, Kentucky, and Indiana University Bloomington, before moving to London, England, to study at the Royal Central School of Speech and Drama in 1972.

== Career ==
After leaving the Central School, Diuguid did street theatre and worked with the fringe group A Plum Line which rehearsed in the ballroom of an Eaton Square squat (next door to Lord Boothby's home). From there, it was a short step to the recently formed Gay Sweatshop and, in 1976, a three-month tour of Jill Posner's coming-out play Any Woman Can, which provoked bomb threats. In 1979, she directed her last production with this company, The Dear Love of Comrades by Noël Greig, about the 19th-century socialist utopian, and early LGBT activist, Edward Carpenter. The following year, at her instigation, the first women's festival was held at the Action Space (now the Drill Hall) which trailblazed the future of lesbian theatre, such as Susan Griffin's Voices staged by Diuguid. She also formed the Women's Project Company (with Kate Crutchley, 1979) and directed several other plays: Louise Page's Tissue (1978), the first play about breast cancer; Noël Greig's Angels Descend On Paris (1980), concerning the Nazi persecution of gays and Jews; Timberlake Wertenbaker's New Anatomies (1981); and Patterns (1984), by her own company, Changing Women.

Diuguid had a strong alliance with Clean Break, a women's theatre company formed by ex-prisoners, directing the plays The Easter Egg (1983) by Chris Tchaikovsky, a prison reformer, and Lin Coghlan's Apache Tears (2000). Other major productions included Howard Brenton's Sore Throats (1979); Darrah Cloud's The Stick Wife (1991), about the wives of three Ku Klux Klan members; and Request Programme, by Franz Xaver Kroetz (1986) with actress Eileen Nicholas, for which Diuguid won a best director award. Throughout the 1980s and 1990s, she travelled extensively in Australia, Brazil (as a guest director, at the British Council Theatre Group, with Luiz Päetow), Japan and Israel (where a traumatic personal experience led, 10 years later, to her shortfilm Aftermath). Furthermore, she became a staff director to the English National Opera and also worked as an associate director at the Hampstead Theatre.

== Later years ==
In 1999, Diuguid settled in South Africa and started an arts and drama group with male prisoners at the Leeuwkop Maximum Security Prison. "Doing work about people who are at the edge, is for me second nature," she said. The next year, having been diagnosed with breast cancer, she started a project in Alexandra township using dance, drama, art and movement to help empower and heal traumatised children. The name of the project was Voices, and the name of her company, "Dedel'ingoma" (which means Release your song). In 2002, she directed the techno-opera Earthdiving in Cape Town. Diuguid continued working until shortly before her death in 2003. Her companion of 17 years, South African filmmaker Melanie Chait, and their foster son Desmond, survived her. She left instructions to spread her cremated remains in England, South Africa and Kentucky. Diuguid was memorialized by a plaque in St Michael's and All Angels Church, Guiting Power, Gloucestershire, England, and with a cenotaph in the Diuguid family plot in Ghent Cemetery in Carroll County, Kentucky.

== Filmography ==
Year	Title	Role	Notes
1981	Reds	Jane Heap	
