= Lileana Blain-Cruz =

American theatre director

Lileana Blain-Cruz is an American theatre director who currently works as the Resident Director of Lincoln Center Theater.

== Early life and education ==
Blain-Cruz grew up primarily in New York City and Miami. She earned her BA in English with certificates in Theater and Spanish from Princeton University in 2006. She earned an MFA in Directing from the David Geffen School of Drama at Yale University in 2012.

== Early career ==
In her last year as an undergraduate at Princeton, Blain-Cruz directed Ntozake Shange’s For Colored Girls Who Have Considered Suicide / When the Rainbow Is Enuf for her senior thesis. She directed Suzan-Lori Parks’ 365 Days 365 Plays at GALA Hispanic Theater. She continued to direct for Princeton for their Summer Theater from 2007 to 2009.

In 2009, Blain-Cruz co-founded Overhead Projector, a devised theater company, and continues to serve as curator.

Blain-Cruz directed plays at Yale School of Drama and Yale Cabaret from 2009 to 2011, including devised pieces by Overhead Projector such as Cavity and SALOME. Blain-Cruz was co-Artistic Director at Yale Cabaret in 2011–12. In 2011, she also directed Gertrude Stein’s Doctor Faustus Lights the Lights at Yale School of Drama. She directed Buffalo Maine by Martyna Majok in 2012 as part of the Carlotta Festival of New Plays.

Her 2011 production of The Taming of the Shrew starred Lupita Nyong’o, then a graduate student in acting, as Kate. Her interpretation ended with Kate poisoning the other characters, and the production is known for “its freshness and power” according to James Bundy.

In 2013, she directed The Bakkhai (translated by Ned Moore) at Bard College, and Hollow Roots by Christina Anderson for the Under the Radar Festival at The Public Theater. In 2015, she directed Salome at JACK in Brooklyn, and in 2016, Red Speedo by Lucas Hnath at New York Theatre Workshop and Revolt. She Said. Revolt Again. by Alice Birch at Soho Repertory Theatre.

Her 2016 direction of The Death of the Last Black Man in the Whole Entire World by Suzan-Lori Parks at Signature Theatre was lauded by critic Ben Brantley, who called it “a hypnotic staging” by Blain-Cruz.

== Later direction ==
In 2017, she directed War by Branden Jacobs-Jenkins, at Yale Repertory Theater, The Bluest Eye by Toni Morrison and Lydia Diamond, based on Morrison's novel, at The Guthrie Theater, Henry IV, Part I and Much Ado About Nothing, casting a woman as Dogberry, both at Oregon Shakespeare Festival, and Pipeline at Lincoln Center Theater.

In 2018, Blain-Cruz directed Thunderbodies by Kate Tarker at Soho Rep, The House That Will Not Stand by Marcus Gardley at New York Theatre Workshop, and Fabulation, Or the Reeducation of Undine at Signature Theatre, which was directed with “screwball precision” by Blain-Cruz. Her 2018 production of Water by the Spoonful at the Mark Taper Forum was part of a Los Angeles-wide production of Quiara Alegría Hudes’ trilogy with the other plays staged at the Kirk Douglas Theatre and the Los Angeles Theatre Center.

In 2019, she directed Branden Jacobs-Jenkins’ play Girls, a riff on The Bacchae, for Yale Rep, Maria Irene Fornes’ play, Fefu and Her Friends, at TFANA, and in 2020, Anatomy of a Suicide by Alice Birch at Atlantic Theater Company.

In 2022, Blain-Cruz directed Dreaming Zenzile by Somi Kakoma for a rolling world premiere production that “brought together seven producers” including New York Theatre Workshop, The Repertory Theatre of St. Louis, and The National Black Theatre. In 2023, she directed White Girl in Danger at Second Stage / Vineyard Theatre.

== Lincoln Center Theater ==
Blain-Cruz became the Resident Director of Lincoln Center Theater in 2020.

Blain-Cruz had directed War by Jacobs-Jenkins at Lincoln Center Theater in 2016. She directed Marys Seacole by Jackie Sibblies Drury in 2019, for which she and Drury received a Special Citation Obie Award.

She directed The Skin of Our Teeth by Thornton Wilder which included additional material by Branden Jacobs-Jenkins in 2022. This was her Broadway debut as a director, and she was nominated for the Tony Award for Best Direction of a Play.

== Opera and music ==
In 2019, Blain-Cruz directed Charles Gounod’s Faust at Opera Omaha. In 2021, she directed an opera film of Hansel & Gretel with music by Engelbert Humperdinck, for Houston Grand Opera and she directed the premiere of Wayne Shorter and esperanza spalding's opera Iphigenia at ArtsEmerson in Boston, with set design by Frank Gehry.

In 2022, she directed The Listeners by Missy Mazzoli at The Norwegian National Opera, in 2023 Stranger Love by Dylan Mattingly at the Los Angeles Philharmonic, and in 2024, she will direct John Adams's oratorio El Niño at Metropolitan Opera.

== Arts development and writing ==
She wrote for the television series, Dead Ringers, in 2023. She wrote the play Create Dangerously, based on Edwidge Danticat's book of essays, and directed it at Miami New Drama in 2023.

In January 2024, it was announced that a new musical about Prince called Purple Rain was in the works, with book by Branden Jacobs-Jenkins and directed by Blain-Cruz. Blain-Cruz and Jacobs-Jenkins met as undergraduates at Princeton, and they have collaborated many times.

== Teaching and honors ==
Blain-Cruz was the Allen Lee Hughes Directing Fellow at Arena Stage from 2006 to 2007. She held a fellowship at the Goodman Theater in 2008. She was Artistic Associate at The Orchard Project & The Exchange from 2007 to 2009, and in the Director's Lab at Lincoln Center Theater in 2008.

In both 2017 and 2018, she was a United States Artists Fellow, and a former New York Theatre Workshop 2050 Fellowship awardee.

She was a Presidential Visiting Fellow at Yale in 2020-21 and teaches at the David Geffen School of Drama at Yale.

== Awards ==
- 2006: Alan Downer Thesis Prize, Princeton University
- 2009, 2010, 2011: Edgar Cullman Scholar, Yale School of Drama
- 2011: Julian Milton Kaufman Memorial Prize, Yale University
- 2011: Pierre-Andre Salim Prize, Yale University
- 2017: Obie Award for Best Direction for The Death of the Last Black Man in the Whole Entire World
- 2018: Josephine Abady Award from the League of Professional Theatre Women
- 2019: Obie Award for Special Citations
- 2020: Lincoln Center Emerging Artist
- 2021: Doris Duke Artist
- 2022: Founders Award for Excellence in Directing, Drama League
