= Dishonour (film) =

Drama short film

Dishonour is a 2017 drama short film written and directed by Terrence Turner and produced by Timothy Turner. The film, starring Mimi Ndiweni, centers around the theme of Female genital mutilation.

Dishonour has screened internationally and won awards at festivals such as the Stockholm Short Festival, the San Francisco Arthouse Short Festival, the Rotterdam Independent Film Festival, and the Rome Women Film Festival.

== Plot ==
Dishonour follows a migrant family as they prepare birthday celebrations for five-year-old daughter Babe in their newly adopted home in the U.K. Tensions arise when differing views on the cultural practice of FGM between Babe's father and Babe's aunt lead to a potentially tragic outcome for the young girl.

== Cast ==
All six characters in the film are portrayed by Mimi Ndiweni. These include the five-year-old Babe, her father, elderly aunt and young cousin, the radio host and the babysitter. Mimi Ndiweni also provides the voices of five off-screen characters.

== Production ==
Dishonour was entirely shot in one location, on a black box theatrical stage in Vancouver, Canada. Mimi Ndiweni's wardrobe consists of a simple black outfit that is worn throughout the film. The six on-screen characters portrayed by Mimi are differentiated through her change of tone, accent, and body expression and a minimal use of props that include a stuffed doll and a pair of reading glasses. All of these directorial decisions are more suggestive of a one-woman theatrical play than a typical cinematic movie.

== Release ==
Dishonour premiered at the Cardiff International Film Festival in 2017. It is distributed by Calendar Film Ltd.

== Reception ==
Dishonour has received overall positive responses by critics. Hibo Wardere, a Somali-born campaigner against FGM, said that Dishonour "touched on the core problem of FGM" and "illustrates the real dynamics of a family dealing with FGM." Dominic Corr's review reads that Dishonour "makes an impact, exposing viewers to the jarring realities of FGM and presenting the necessary communication that needs to take place to dispel the myths surrounding it," and lauds Mimi Ndiweni as "remarkable in her ability to weave herself in and out of roles." Cade Anderson's review highlights Dishonour's portrayal of "the clash between tribal and industrialized cultures" and "guides viewers through the complexity of ancient traditions carried into modern contexts.""
