= Mimî M. Khayisa =

British actress (born 1991)

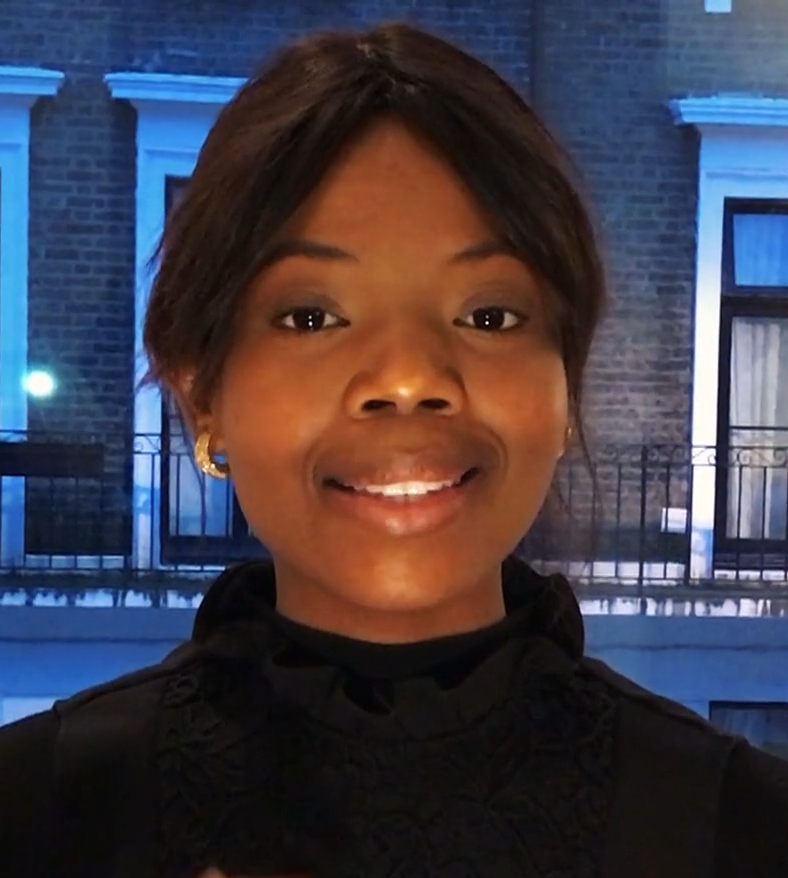
- Khayisa in 2017
- Born: Mimî Michelle Ndiweni; 31 August 1991 (age 35); Guildford, Surrey, England
- Education: Royal Welsh College of Music & Drama (BA)
- Occupation: Actress
- Years active: 2013–present

Mimî Michelle Ndiweni (born 31 August 1991), since 2021 credited as Mimî M. Khayisa, is a British actress. She is known for playing Fringilla Vigo in Netflix's The Witcher, Tilly Brockless in the television series Mr Selfridge, and Ester/Jekasai in the stage production of The Convert at The Gate Theatre in London. She has also appeared on film in Catherine Called Birdy, Star Wars: The Rise of Skywalker, Cinderella and The Legend of Tarzan.

She won the Spotlight Prize in 2013 and went on to work for the Royal Shakespeare Company after graduating from Royal Welsh College of Music and Drama. Khayisa was also featured as One to Watch by the Independent in 2013 and was on the Evening Standard's Stars of 2015 list after performing in the RSC's Midsummer Mischief Festival.

== Early life ==
Khayisa was born in England; her father is from Ntabazinduna in Matabeleland, Zimbabwe, and is the eldest son of Chief Kayisa Ndiweni, while her mother was a Zulu from South Africa and was the daughter of Reverend Geoffrey Bizeni Mkhwanazi, of Assemblies of God in South Africa. Her mother died at the age of thirty-seven. Khayisa grew up in Guildford, Surrey and started acting as a teenager, joining the Yvonne Arnaud Mill Street Studios while she was in secondary school. From there she went on to complete a degree at the Royal Welsh College of Music & Drama in Cardiff.

=== Spotlight Prize ===
At age 21, Khayisa (then stylised as Mimi Ndiweni) won the Spotlight Prize – beating out competition from students from 20 top UK drama schools in front of industry experts - with her performance of Jenna Marbles’ How to Avoid Talking to People You Don’t Want to Talk To.

== Career ==
=== Theatre ===
Khayisa has stated that theatre is her first love, and was taken on by the Royal Shakespeare Company in 2013 after graduating from Royal Welsh. While in the RSC her most notable roles were in Wendy & Peter Pan as Tiger Lily, King Lear where she played Cordelia, and Hamlet where she played Ophelia.

She left the RSC in 2015 to take on a regular appearance in the television show Mr Selfridge, but has returned to the RSC on a number occasions as a guest. Khayisa toured North America with the Royal Shakespeare Company in 2018, playing the part of Cordelia in King Lear in New York, and Ophelia in Hamlet in Washington, D.C.

In 2017, Khayisa had her first leading role, playing Jekesai/Ester in Danai Gurira's The Convert at the Gate Theatre in London. The play itself and her part in it received critical acclaim, with five star reviews from some of the most respected critics in London.

In 2025, Khaysia starred in another lead role, as Bonolo in the world premiere of Amy Jephta's A Good House at the Royal Court Theatre and the Bristol Old Vic, again, receiving critical acclaim from theatre critics.

=== Film and television ===
Khayisa's first appearance in a major film was as the Slipper Lady in Disney's Cinderella in 2015. She then played Eshe in The Legend of Tarzan in 2016, starring alongside Margot Robbie. In 2016, Khayisa played Tilly Brockless in Mr Selfridge for eight episodes of the last season and in May 2017, played the part of Abby in the Doctor Who episode "Oxygen" during its tenth series.

In October 2018, Netflix announced that Khayisa would be playing the part of Fringilla Vigo in The Witcher. She appeared in Season 1 (2019), Season 2 (2021) and Season 3 (2023).

In 2022, Khayisa appeared as Lady Berenice Sidebottom in Catherine Called Birdy.

== Filmography ==
=== Film ===
Year	Title	Role
2015	Cinderella	Slipper lady
2016	The Legend of Tarzan	Eshe
2016	The Last Dragonslayer	TV news anchor
2017	Dishonour	Every character
2019	Star Wars: The Rise of Skywalker	Resistance officer
2022	Catherine Called Birdy	Lady Berenice Sidebottom

=== Television ===
Year	Title	Role	Notes
2016	Mr Selfridge	Tilly Brockless	Recurring role (series 4)
2016	Yonderland	Kelly	
2017	Doctor Who	Abby	Episode: "Oxygen"
2017	Rellik	DC Andrea Reed	Recurring role (series 1)
2018	Black Earth Rising	Mary Mundanzi	Guest role (2 episodes)
2019	In the Long Run	Beatrice	Christmas special
2019–present	The Witcher	Fringilla	Main role
2022	Earthstorm	Narrator	

=== Theatre ===
Title	Role
The Ant and the Cicada	Laskarina Bouboulina
Revolt. She Said. Revolt Again.	Ensemble show
Hamlet	Ophelia
The Taming of the Shrew	Lucentio
Wendy & Peter Pan	Tiger Lily
Soul	Tammy Gaye
The Convert	Jekesai/Ester
King Lear	Cordelia
A Good House	Bonolo
