= The Malady of Death =

Book by Marguerite Duras

- First edition
- Author: Marguerite Duras
- Original title: La Maladie de la mort
- Translator: Barbara Bray
- Language: French
- Publisher: Les Éditions de Minuit
- Publication date: 1982
- Publication place: France
- English publication date: 1986
- Pages: 60
- ISBN: 2707306398

The Malady of Death (French: La Maladie de la mort) is a 1982 novella by the French writer Marguerite Duras. It tells the story of a man who pays a woman to spend several weeks with him by the sea to learn "how to love".

== Plot ==
The Malady of Death is about an unconventional sexual relationship between a man and a woman. The man hires the woman to stay with him in a hotel by the sea, hoping that by doing so, he will be able to experience love. The woman accepts the proposal even though she is not a prostitute. After some days, the woman tells him that he is incapable of love as he is afflicted with the "malady of death". The book is written in the second-person narrative; throughout the book, the man is referred to as "you", and the woman as "she".

== Genesis ==
Duras began to write the book in Trouville, where she drank six to seven litres of wine each day. When the first ten pages were finished she moved to Neauphle. She stopped eating but continued drinking; she began each morning by drinking two glasses which she vomited up, and was then able to keep the third. Duras had become incapable to write herself, so she recited lines while her muse Yann Andréa wrote them down for her. The manuscript had the development title "A scent of heliotrope and citron", but when it was 20 pages long Duras changed it to the final title. Eventually Duras agreed to go to a clinic for alcoholics, and on 21 October 1982, she was taken to the American Hospital of Paris. Upon returning from the clinic she immediately began to proofread the work.

== Adaptations ==
1999 McElhinney production

Film director Andrew Repasky McElhinney designed and staged The Malady of Death (in English, Barbara Bray translation) in a production that opened December 14, 1999 at the Atrium Theater, 64 West 11th Street, New York City, starring Alix D. Smith and Oliver Wyman

In McElhinney's production of The Malady of Death, the audience entered the space in near darkness. The performance began with a tape recording of McElhinney reading Duras' notes on staging The Malady of Text (found as the Afterwards to that published text). Then, the sound of ("music of") the sea faded in, and actors Smith (the Speaker) and Wyman (the Listener) were faintly revealed sitting a table with a dim lamp, smoking. This visual image was inspired by Duras' movie, Le Camion [The Truck], of which director McElhinney remarked that, "Drama becomes nothing and yet it suffices. ... The Truck highlights the excessive artifice that plagues much of our modern world."

On the use of cigarette smoke in the production, director McElhinney wrote, "I wanted a lot of smoking in the play so that I could make the space uncomfortable and thus claustrophobic with the smoke." Also, revealed stage right over the duration of the show was a tableau of an inexpensive plastic blow-up doll "reading" magazines on a beach blanket. In the program essay, "On Staging The Malady of Death," director McElhinney commented that, "A blow-up-doll was perfect, as it is an object, like the girl is in the text. A blow-up-doll is an inherently sexual being and would strike the cord between sex and commerce that I think is implicit in Duras' text."

As Smith read the Duras text (..."reading" as Duras instructed, as opposed to traditionally memorizing the text...), the lights very slowly rose over the duration of the 45-minute play, on both the stage and the audience, while the theater space was almost entirely filed with white smoke. The last visual sensation toward the end of the show was one of being on a hazy beach at dawn. In the essay, "On Staging The Malady of Death," director McElhinney remarked The Malady of Death, "should be ritualistic." In the final minutes of the play, the lights rose to an extreme level of brightness, and the audience was much more lit than the stage, and, in effect, the performance transferred its focus from the actors onstage to the audience watching the inaction on stage. Director McElhinney commented that, "At the end, everyone is part of the play, and the play has been deconstructed so that it is pure theater. Duras, I hope, would be proud."

2018 Birch/Mitchell production

Playwright Alice Birch adapted The Malady of Death for the stage under its French title, La Maladie de la Mort. The play premiered at the 2018 Edinburgh Fringe Festival and was directed by Katie Mitchell. The play was narrated in French by Irène Jacob and English subtitles were projected onscreen. Mitchell's production relied heavily on the use of live-feed greyscale images to give the audience a sense of dissociation.

== See also ==
- 1982 in literature
- 20th-century French literature
