= The Death of the Last Black Man in the Whole Entire World =

1990 play by Suzan-Lori Parks

- Original language: English
- Written by: Suzan-Lori Parks

Premiere
- Date: 1990; 36 years ago
- Place: BACA Downtown

The Death of the Last Black Man in the Whole Entire World is a play by Suzan-Lori Parks. It premiered in 1990 in Brooklyn, New York, and was produced Off-Broadway in 2016.

== Concept ==
The play brings to life a menagerie of biblical and historical black characters, as well as satirical stereotypes of African Americans. The "last man" of the title is named Black Man With Watermelon. He dies multiple deaths over the course of the show. Other characters include Yes and Greens Blackeyed Peas Cornbread, Lots of Grease and Lots of Pork, Ham, Queen Hatshepsut, Before Columbus, Black Woman with Fried Drumstick, Prunes and Prisms.

The Death of the Last Black Man in the Whole Entire World does not follow a traditional western linear form of storytelling. Instead in both plot and dialogue the play uses the repetitive structures of jazz and traditional black call-and-response.

The play is located in "A great hole. In the middle of nowhere. The hole is an exact replica of the Great Hole of History." The Hole is symbolic of the invisible and forgotten black narrative in American history. Suzan Lori-Parks explains, "since history is a recorded or remembered event, theatre, for me, is the perfect place to `make' history--that is, because so much of African-American history has been unrecorded, dismembered, washed out, one of my tasks as playwright is to ... locate the ancestral burial ground, dig for bones, find bones, hear the bones sing, write it down."

Mel Gussow, writing in The New York Times, noted: "If the last black man should die tomorrow, what would the artifacts of his existence be? Her mission: find the signature behind the stereotype. The Death of the Last Black Man ... becomes an act of ecology as well as a prophecy of mourning. That death, when it comes, occurs again and again."

== Productions ==
The play premiered at the BACA Downtown, Brooklyn, New York, in September 1990. It was directed by Beth A. Schachter, with Leon Addison Brown as Black Man With Watermelon and Pamala Tyson as Black Woman With Fried Drumstick.

The play was produced Off-Broadway by the Signature Theatre Company, from October 25, 2016 (previews), officially on November 13, 2016, and closing on December 18, 2016. The play was directed by Lileana Blain-Cruz and featured Daniel J. Watts as the Black Man with Watermelon. This production won the 2017 Obie Award for Directing presented by the American Theatre Wing.

== Critical response ==
The TimeOut reviewer wrote of the 2016 production: "A jazzy, poetic fever dream about the wounds left by erasure on the book of history,... Clearly, this is not an easy play to dissect or digest, with diverse influences that suggest Gertrude Stein, Adrienne Kennedy, Samuel Beckett and Glenn Ligon. It’s a jagged, angry, weird text, yet director Lileana Blain-Cruz stages it in high style, with a skin-prickling soundscape by Palmer Hefferan (including dance-break music that’s aggressively fun) and a raft of brave in-your-face performances."
