= Midsummer Mischief =

Series of four plays in 2014

Midsummer Mischief is a series of four plays performed by the Royal Shakespeare Company at The Other Place and the Royal Court Theatre in 2014.

It was initiated with regard to the "Roaring Girls" season at the Swan Theatre in the same year. The playwrights Timberlake Wertenbaker, Alice Birch, E. V. Crowe, and Abi Zakarian were asked to write one play each, answering Laurel Thatcher Ulrich's provocation: "Well-behaved women seldom make history." The four resulting plays are The Ant and the Cicada, Revolt. She Said. Revolt again., I Can Hear You, and This is Not an Exit. The series has been reviewed by major newspapers like The Guardian, The Independent, the Telegraph, or the Birmingham Post, but also by more specialised media, like the feminist blog The F-Word.

== The Ant and the Cicada ==
The Ant and the Cicada is a play by Timberlake Wertenbaker. It is set in rural Greece after the financial crisis in 2009 and discusses the political situation from a utilitarian capitalistic, an idealistic anti-capitalistic and a disinterested point of view.

=== Plot ===
The two sisters Zoe and Selina lead wildly different lives. Zoe has an independent theatre school on their family estate in Greece which desperately needs attending to in several regards. Due to a lack of pupils, Zoe is in high debts and has not been able to pay her bills for some time. Her younger sister Selina has chosen a career in finances and works in London. She finally comes to visit Zoe in Greece together with Alex, a friend of Selina's who works with hedgefunds in the City of London. Alex and Selina have made plans for a lucrative use of the Greek family estate and they trick Zoe into signing a contract. In her relief of having found a solution to all her financial problems, Zoe signs without thoroughly reading the contents. Later she finds out that Selina and Alex have planned to build a hotel where the grandmother's olive trees are now and turn her avantgarde theatre into a tourist attraction. She stands up against the two in a political and philosophical finale.

=== Intertextual references ===
The title refers to one of Aesop's fables which tells the story of an ant and a grasshopper. The ant works all year in order to have enough supplies for the winter. The grasshopper, on the other hand, prefers singing the whole summer but starves to death in winter without food supplies. This contradiction between enjoyable tasks and those needed for subsistence is being depicted both in Aesop's fable and Wertenbaker's play.

Another important parallel can be found in Anton Chekhov's last play The Cherry Orchard. The cherry orchard on the former grounds of an aristocratic family being cut down by its new bourgeois owners resembles the olive trees on Selina's and Zoe's family estate having to make room for Selina's and Alex' capitalistic plans.

In the third scene, Wertenbaker refers to different historical radicals, as Bouboulina, a Greek heroine of independence or the British Romanticist writers Lord Byron and Percy Bysshe Shelley.

== Revolt. She Said. Revolt Again. ==
Revolt. She Said. Revolt Again. is a play by Alice Birch. It deals with the topics of rape culture, sometimes allegorically discussed as trespassing, and body shaming. Societal expectations towards women are displayed and broken, while the gender bias of language is being explored. Most characters do not have names and it is completely up to the reader to imagine the characters behind the written words. It is not clear whether certain characters reoccur during the play or not. Revolt. She Said. Revolt Again. has been staged independently from the other Midsummer Mischief-plays at the Latitude Festival 2014 and the Soho Repertory Theatre, New York, during the spring of 2016 and has in that context been reviewed by newspapers like The New York Times, The New Yorker, or The Village Voice, but also by magazines and websites like Time Out New York or Slate.

=== Plot ===
The play does not have one single plot. Each reader may determine for themselves how the scenes are connected or whether they are in the first place. The first scene in Act One is a woman and a man talking about sex. The woman takes up a dominant way of expressing herself which leaves the man almost speechless and unsure how to react. In the second scene in Act One, a couple is arguing about person A having proposed to person B. Person B feels offended and objectified by person A's choice of words ('I want...') and doubts the motifs behind marriage. The third scene of Act One is a dialogue between an employer and an employee, referred to as a woman, who wants to work less in order to have more free time. The employer automatically assumes she is pregnant or wants to become pregnant and draws a line between mothers and career girls. The fourth and last scene of Act One is set in a supermarket where a woman had been lying on the floor with her dress over her head, exposing her naked, and apparently not very model-like, body together with different kinds of groceries. The two supermarket employees talking to her, seem to care most about the fact that the body she was presenting was imperfect. The woman defends her action by claiming that being constantly available and open is the only way to prevent being raped: "They Cannot Invade if you Want It."

Act Two deals with the topic of motherhood. It is the only scene in which the characters are given names. There is grandma, who is visited by her daughter Dinah and Dinah's daughter Agnes. Dinah was left by her mother when she was young and tries to find out why. She says, grandma denies having a daughter, because Dinah is the result of a brutal and abusive relationship. However, the readership cannot know whether this actually is the truth or whether it is just Dinah's explanation of something she cannot understand.

In Act Three numerous scenes of different length and topic overlap each other. There is a teacher telling a mother about her 4-year-old son who mirrors the mother's body image and mentions a thigh gap as his greatest wish. One scene is about a rapist of a disabled girl doing community service as punishment. The victim of a robbery and rape has to proof they were not actually the robber and rapist themselves. A perverted, commercialised view of sex is displayed as well as an arranged child marriage and a debate about who is feminist. Also, there is a trespassing scene showing the absurdity of the landowner having to apologise to the trespasser for not having put up a bigger sign. There are scenes about trivialising rape jokes and explanatory stories about rape among animals. Up to three scenes takes place simultaneously before culminating in a monologue about the difficulty of transferring a thought into action.

The last act, Act Four, is a short conversation between four women demonstrating a male fear of a man-eating kind of feminism and at the same time feminism's failure to find a common ground to start its revolution from.

== I Can Hear You ==
I Can Hear You is a play by E.V. Crowe. It examines the gender roles at work in a family and the possibility to escape those roles according to individual desires. The family consists of David and Marie, their children Ruth and Tommy, and Tommy's girlfriend Sandra.

=== Plot ===
Tommy's funeral is the second one that his sister Ruth, freshly emigrated to Dubai with her husband, and father David have had to organise. Mother Marie's did not attract as many guests as her son's, but this is explained by Ruth by the fact that Tommy was still young and died suddenly in a car crash. His girlfriend survived and now wants to start a teaching course in another town. But first, she wants to try to contact her dead boyfriend by help of her friend Ellie.

Ruth and David are rather sceptical about Ellie's methods, but when Tommy suddenly walks into the living room as if nothing ever happened, Ruth who is unsure about wanting to be a mother or not, thinks of the possibility to contact her dead mother Marie and maybe even to bring her back as well. Ruth does not understand why she cannot replace Tommy in the father and son football game, but for Tommy and David, this is nothing worth discussing: Ruth should not be playing football but rather make the sandwiches. When she insists on playing, she gets sent off for being too aggressive. Tommy wants to re-establish a status quo of before Marie's death: Ruth taking over Marie's role, cooking and running the house, Sandra staying at home as well, as now Tommy is back to support them together with David.

Finally, everybody except Tommy agree on trying to contact Marie. However, they fail to gather important items that remind them of her and David and Ellie are the only ones who see Marie's answer: She does not want to come back to live with them.

== This is Not an Exit ==
This is Not an Exit is a play by Abi Zakarian. It deals with the variety of so-called female behaviour by displaying four entirely different female characters.

=== Plot ===
Nora is in her 40s and a journalist for a women's magazine. She currently suffers an identity crisis and is trying to find herself. Her caring mother, who fought for women's rights in her youth and cannot understand today's lack of political interest, wants to help her become happy like she was as a child. At the same time, the life coach and career woman Gulch and the new media teenager Ripley do theirs in order to bring Nora back on track. Whether all this happens inside Nora's mind only, or in the real world, is impossible to determine.
