= The Mongol Khan =

Modern Mongolian theatrical production

- Poster
- Original title: Tamgagui Tur (lit. '"State Without a Seal"')
- Written by: Lkhagvasuren Bavuu
- Music by: Birvaa Myagmar, Odbayar Battogtokh
- Genre: Historical tragedy, musical theatre
- Setting: Xiongnu Empire

Premiere
- Date: April 20, 2022
- Place: Mongolian State Academic Theatre, Ulaanbaatar
- Directed by: Hero Baatar
- Official website

The Mongol Khan is a modern Mongolian play and a reproduction of the 1998 tragedy Tamgagui Tur (English: State Without A Seal) by the Mongolian writer and playwright Lkhagvasuren Bavuu. Set during the time of the Xiongnu Empire (c. 100 BC), it depicts the fictional Archug Khan's struggles to ensure his heir is legitimate and worthy of his throne. The play is directed by Hero Baatar and produced by Amartuvshin Amundra and Myagmar Esunmunkh; the international production was assisted by playwright Timberlake Wertenbaker and historian John Man.

It is the first Mongolian production to be performed internationally. After completing 151 performances at the Mongolian State Academic Theatre in Ulaanbaatar, a planned run of performances in Inner Mongolia in September 2023 were cancelled by Chinese authorities. In November 2023, The Mongol Khan began a two–week run at the London Coliseum, the largest theatre in the West End, where it met with mixed reviews. While the costuming, choreography and sense of spectacle were generally received positively, the dialogue, pacing, and narrative were criticised. The play was staged at the Sands Theatre in Singapore in autumn 2024, and it is planned to run in Japan in October 2025.

== Synopsis ==
The two queens of the Xiongnu Empire (Hunnu Empire), Great Queen Tsetser and Queen Consort Gerel, have given birth to sons on the same day. As Archug Khan, ruler of the empire, has long been distant from Tsetser and in love with Gerel, he suspects the former of adultery. Against the advice of his advisor, Imperial Chancellor Egereg, Archug takes the unprecedented step of proclaiming his consort's son as heir to the Xiongnu throne. Egereg, the secret lover of Tsetser and father of her child, plots to seize control of the empire through his son. He blackmails Tsetser into swapping the babies, which she reluctantly does. Egereg's son is thus brought up as Crown Prince Achir, Archug's heir, while the khan's real son, Khuchir, is raised lovingly by Tsetser in ignorance of his true identity.

As the boys grow, it is clear that Achir would make a terrible ruler — he is quick to anger, unintelligent, ill-mannered, and lustful. Archug tries to prepare Achir for rulership but fails again and again. Eventually, he has his son put to death, both to preserve the honor of his court and to ensure the survival of the empire. Gerel commits suicide in her grief. With his plans foiled, Egereg decides to do away with both Khuchir and Archug and proclaim himself emperor. Khuchir overhears the chancellor boasting to Tsetser of his new plan and goes to confront him, but the schemer fatally wounds him with a knife. Tsetser holds her son as he dies, before she kills herself as well.

Egereg seizes the moment to attack Archug, who is bewildered by the sudden loss of his entire family. Egereg overpowers Archug, reveals his malevolent deeds, and demands that the khan give him the imperial seal. Archug stubbornly refuses and manages to kill his treacherous advisor. Knowing that his bloodline has been erased, the aging emperor orders that his seal should be buried in secrecy, decreeing that whoever finds it will be his successor.

== Cast ==
- Erdenebileg Ganbold as Archug Khan
- Bold-Erdene Sugar as Chancellor Egereg
- Uranchimeg Urtnasan as Queen Tsetser
- Dulguun Odkhuu as Queen Consort Gerel
- Dorjsuren Shadav as Crown Prince Achir
- Shinebayar Baasankhuu as Prince Khuchir
- Tserendavga Purevdorg as the Shaman

Including the seven lead actors, there are seventy cast members in total.

== History ==
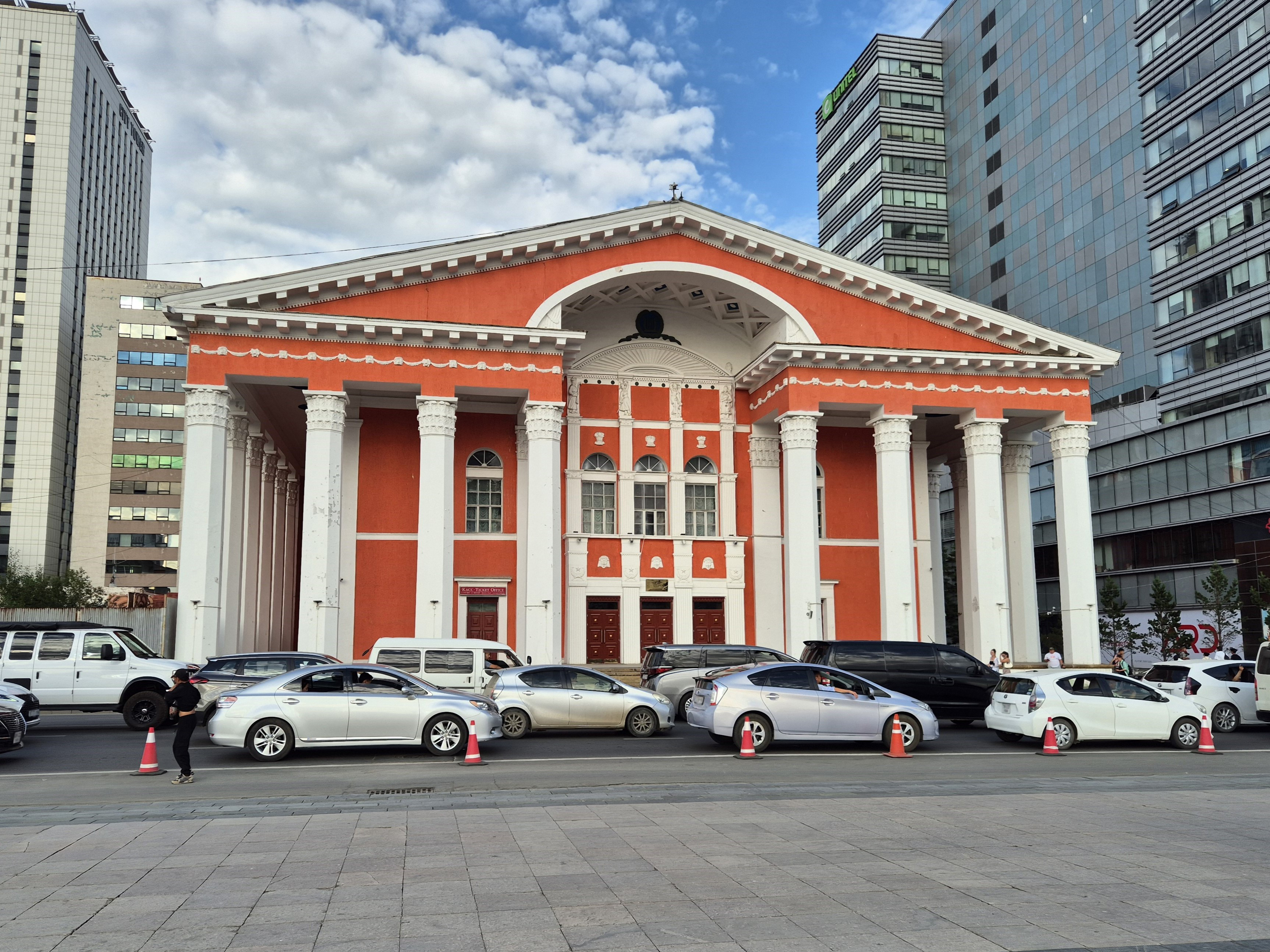
The play was revived at the Mongolian State Academic Theatre

In 1998, a tragedy known as Tamgagui Tur (English: State Without A Seal) was written by the Mongolian playwright Lkhagvasuren Bavuu, who wanted to explore concepts of statehood and good rulership. Lkhagvasuren, the "People's Writer of Mongolia", said in 2000 that his play, which he considered "the zenith of [his] literary career", illustrated the "ancient and noble traditions" of the Mongol people. After the playwright's death in 2019, the play was revived by one of his friends, the director Hero Baatar; the new production, funded by a public-private partnership between the Mongolian Ministry of Culture and Baatar's production company, premiered in Ulaanbaatar on 20 April 2022. It was the most-watched production in Mongolian theatrical history, selling out 151 consecutive performances at the Mongolian State Academic Theatre; at the seventy-performance mark, it had already been seen by 40,000 people and had earned in excess of 5 billion tögrög.

In mid-May 2022, less than a month after the production's opening, Culture Minister Chinbat Nomin outlined plans to export the play internationally, as part of the governing Mongolian People's Party's promotion of the Mongolian cultural and artistic industries abroad. It was announced that Hohhot, China, would host a run of performances in September 2023. In February 2023, it was also announced that the play would be performed in the West End; the location—the London Coliseum, the biggest theatre in London—was revealed in June.

=== International performances ===
Three days before their arrival in Hohhot, officials of the Chinese Communist Party informed the cast that they would perform in the much smaller Ordos City, and that any use of the word "khan" would have to be removed. The cast was also subjected to harassment via activation of sprinklers during rehearsals and were eventually forced to rehearse in a nearby park without their costumes or set. Finally, forty minutes before the production's opening on September 19, authorities announced that the performances were cancelled due to a "power failure"; the 130-strong theatrical company were then forcibly confined to their hotel rooms for six days before being expelled from China. The Chinese authorities have likely feared that the play would encourage separatist movements among ethnic Mongolians in Inner Mongolia, and reacted with hostility, despite having previously approved the performances.

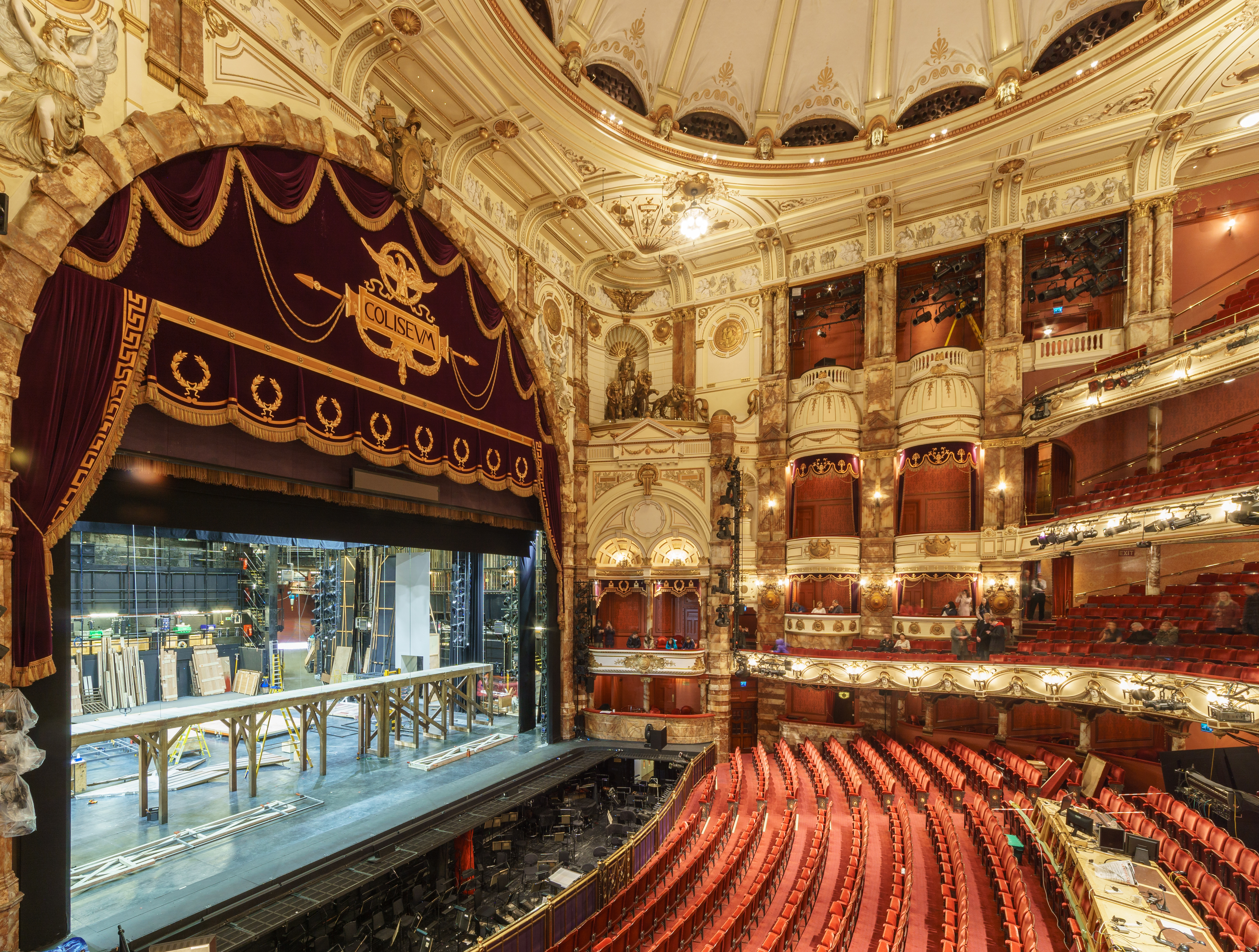
The London production was performed at the London Coliseum (pictured in 2018).

For the London production, the company had to adapt significantly. The Mongolian State Academic Theatre has a capacity of 550, less than a quarter of the Coliseum's 2,359. Nick Barnes, a puppetry designer who previously worked on Life of Pi, collaborated with the show's producers to create a "Mongolian dragon-style puppet", much more mammal-like than the traditionally serpentine Chinese dragon. As the Ulaanbaatar theatre is several decades old and very out-of-date by European standards, nearly every aspect of equipment and staging had to be updated for the Coliseum. The script was translated into English by the historian John Man, a noted author on Mongolian history, in association with his wife, the playwright Timberlake Wertenbaker. Even though only one member was fluent in the language, the entire cast learned the English script phonetically in case they needed to perform it in London; in the end, it was decided that the play would be performed in the original Mongolian, with the Man/Wertenbaker translation surtitled above. The performances ran from 17 November until 2 December, attracting over 42,000 viewers in total.

Another run of performances were staged at the Sands Theatre in Singapore between 17 October and 3 November 2024. Unlike in London, both Mongolian-language and English-language performances were offered, with subtitles in English for the former and Mandarin Chinese for both. This run attracted a total audience of over 30,000 viewers. A third overseas run is planned to be staged in Japan in October 2025, including eleven days in Tokyo and three in Nagoya.

The play's international performances have been characterised as an exertion of Mongolian soft power. The first Mongolian production to be performed internationally, The Mongol Khan has been described as a "cultural attack on the West" from Mongolia, in concert with other initiatives such as museum exhibitions and the promotion of rock band The Hu. The performances in London also commemorated the 60th anniversary of the United Kingdom's recognition of Mongolian sovereignty—the first such recognition from a Western country. Baatar has expressed his wish to perform the play in other countries, including Turkey, France, and the United States, should the play perform well in the "home of theatre and the country of Shakespeare".

== Reception ==
The London production was met by a mixed response from critics. Writing for The Guardian, Arifa Akbar praised the choreography, costuming, and sense of scale. Although she felt that the plot was "ponderous" and some aspects came close to being "ludicrous" and "cheesy", she awarded four stars out of five for the production's spectacle. Irene Lloyd of everything-theatre.co.uk also gave the show four stars, reserving especial praise for the costuming and choreography; she noted that these aspects and the "sheer spectacle" overcame issues with the "flaky" plot, lack of character development, and unusual acting style. The play was awarded three stars by both Debra Caine of The Times and by Time Out magazine. Caine complimented the production's extravagance and Ganbold's King Lear-like performance; Time Out's reviewer felt that the play's origin as a diplomatic mission compromised its quality, with a superficial plot, ponderous pacing, and misplaced excess somewhat rescued by "beautiful stage images and a great battle scene at the end".

In a one-star review, Nick Curtis of The Evening Standard criticised the woodenness of the lead actors and the unsuitability of the English translation, characterising the "hilariously awful" play as an unintelligent, laborious psychodrama. He praised only the costuming and the "well-drilled" choreography. Marianka Swain of The Telegraph was similarly negative, giving the "epically boring" play two stars out of five; like Curtis, she criticised the mishitting dialogue, the "glacial pace", and the "thunderously melodramatic" acting. She reserved special criticism for the depiction of Crown Prince Achir, which linked his disability to "weakness and malevolence".

The Singapore production received generally positive reviews, with praise especially focused on the play's showcasing of Mongolian historical tradition and culture.
