= RashDash =

British feminist theatre company

- Formation: 2009
- Type: Theatre group
- Members: Abbi Greenland (2009-pres.); Helen Goalen (2009-pres.); Becky Wilkie (2017-pres.)
- Website: www.rashdash.co.uk

RashDash is a British feminist theatre company. The company was founded by Abbi Greenland and Helen Goalen. Becky Wilkie later joined. They have produced and created many works, including We Want You to Watch.

Although they lead with feminism at the forefront, they describe their agenda as "…political and Political but always begins with people - we tell stories that call for cultural change."

== History ==
Abbi Greenland and Helen Goalen formed RashDash in 2009 while attending the University of Hull. Greenland's parents were also theatre creators and participated in the political punk-theatre of the 1970s. While still students, Greenland and Goalen took a play called Strict Machine to the National Student Drama Festival.

The first play officially produced by RashDash was The Honeymoon (2009), which centred on two women who had left their fiancés at the altar. Goalen and Greenland created the show with singer-songwriter Becky Wilkie.

Their third member, Becky Wilkie, grew up with Greenland in their home county of Suffolk. A skilled pianist, Wilkie found success in local bands playing pub gigs. It was during the development of The Honeymoon that Greenland suggested bringing Wilkie in to write songs for the show. At the time, she was studying English at the University of Bristol. They collaborated on subsequent RashDash productions Another Someone (2010) and The Frenzy (2013), before becoming a core member of the company when they produced Two Man Show (2016 and 2017).

They say: "We are women and we talk, move, write and make as women. That's important. We are furious and radical and hopeful. That's important. We are friendly, but scary creatures live under the surface. We want to show you a really good time. All of this might change in a minute. At the moment it's true."

== Influences ==
RashDash's influences include The Dresden Dolls, Meow Meow, and Bjork, although they have always strived to use a diverse palate of music and performers as their basis. They also cite Cabaret, and that genre of musical theatre, as a performance influence.

== Don't Go Back To Sleep – The Lockdown Album ==
In 2020, as a response to the COVID-19 pandemic, RashDash created a verbatim concept album titled Don't Go Back To Sleep.

Goalen and Greenland interviewed 18 people from across the world, including participants from China, Sweden, Brazil, and the UK, asking them about their experiences of the first 6 months of the pandemic. Conducting these interviews over Zoom, interviewees were asked the same set of questions over the course of an hour.

Then, with the songwriting and scoring skills of Wilkie, they turned them into songs. It was described by the company as 'a time to reflect on the past six months and our place in the world, to a banging musical soundtrack'. The album samples the interviews, and sets the exact words and intonations - 'y'know's' and 'likes' included - to a genre-bending original musical score written by Wilkie.

Following easing of lockdown restrictions in the UK, it was announced in August 2020 that RashDash would perform a live concert version of the album, being among the first in a season of socially distanced shows reopening the Manchester art venue HOME. Despite the tiered system being announced a week before the shows, with Manchester in tier 3, they were thankfully still allowed to proceed.

Wilkie summed up the experience of finally being back on stage simply as awesome.

One week after they completed the run, it was announced that the UK would enter a second lockdown.

The album was made to be listened to however the audience chooses, but they suggest "…(at least once) you listen to it all the way through, in order."

It includes a track titled I Have To Keep Going, a song in BSL and English, created with and performed by Nadia Nadarajah.

== Productions ==
- The Honeymoon (2009)
- Another Someone (2010)
- Scary Gorgeous (2011)
- Set Fire to Everything!!! (2012)
- The Ugly Sisters (2014)
- We Want You to Watch (2015) – created by RashDash and Alice Birch, at the National Theatre
- Two Man Show (2016 and 2017)
- Snow White & Rose Red (2017)
- The Darkest Corners (2017) – as part of the Transform 17 festival
- Future Bodies (2018) – written by Clare Duffy, in collaboration with Unlimited Theatre
- Three Sisters (2018) – adapted from Anton Chekhov, co-production with Royal Exchange Theatre
- Don't Go Back to Sleep (2020)
- Look at Me Don't Look at Me (2021) – about Elizabeth "Lizzie" Siddal
- Oh Mother (2022) – written by Abbi Greenland and Helen Goalen, devised with Simone Seales, at HOME

== Awards and nominations ==
| Year | Award | Category | Work | Result | Ref. |
|---|---|---|---|---|---|
| 2018 | UK Theatre Awards | Best Touring Production | Three Sisters | Won | |
| 2022 | Edinburgh Festival Fringe | Popcorn Writing Award | Look at Me, Don't Look at Me | Longlist | |
| 2016 | Edinburgh Festival Fringe | Scotsman Fringe Firsts | Two Man Show | Won | |
| 2011 | Edinburgh Festival Fringe | Scotsman Fringe Firsts | Scary Gorgeous | Won | |
| 2010 | Edinburgh Festival Fringe | Scotsman Fringe Firsts | Another Someone | Won | |
