= Noël Greig =

British playwright (1944–2009)

Noël Antony Miller Greig (25 December 1944 – 9 September 2009) was a British playwright most noted for his work in radical gay theatre. Greig wrote over 50 plays, as well as directing and producing numerous companies both in the United Kingdom and around the world.

Greig grew up in Skegness in Lincolnshire, and was educated at The Skegness Grammar School, then at King's College London. In 1968, inspired by the London Arts Lab, he started a mixed media arts centre called the Brighton Combination, with Jenny Harris and Ruth Marks.

One of the hallmarks of Greig's plays is their demonstration of gay liberation themes, with characters who choose to actively assert their gay identities. Among several productions, two were directed by Nancy Diuguid: in 1979, The Dear Love of Comrades, about the 19th-century socialist utopian, and early LGBT activist, Edward Carpenter; and, in 1980, Angels Descend On Paris, concerning the Nazi persecution of gays and Jews. John M. Clum notes that the gay characters in Greig's As Time Goes By "move...from acquiescence of their status as outsiders or criminals to militant assertion of their gay identity, the beginning of gay liberation". Greig also released the antiwar song "Stand Together" in 1979.
