= Anatomy of a Suicide =

2017 play by Alice Birch

- Written by: Alice Birch

Premiere
- Date premiered: June 3, 2017
- Place premiered: Royal Court Theatre

Anatomy of a Suicide is a 2017 play by Alice Birch. It won the 2018 Susan Smith Blackburn Prize.

== Synopsis ==
The play follows three women, Carol, Anna and Bonnie, who, through the course of the play, are revealed to be mother, daughter, and granddaughter. The three women's stories play out simultaneously, while each exists in her own timeline. At the start of the play, Carol has just been released from the hospital after trying to die by suicide, Anna is a heroin addict, and Bonnie is a doctor. Carol and Anna are treated with electroconvulsive therapy. Carol dies by suicide offstage. Anna electrocutes herself in the bath, while her infant daughter, Bonnie, sleeps in the next room. At the end of the play, Bonnie sells the family home.

== Production history ==
Anatomy of a Suicide premiered in 2017 at the Royal Court Theatre in London under the direction of Katie Mitchell and designed by Chloe Lamford. It starred Kate O’Flynn (Anna), Hattie Morahan (Carol), and Adelle Leonce (Bonnie). The premiere ran from June 3 to July 8.

In 2019, a German production, Anatomie eines Suizids, translated by Corinna Brocher, played at the Deutsches Schauspielhaus in Hamburg. Also in 2019, the play had its Australian premiere at the Old Fitz. Lileana Blain-Cruz directed Anatomy of a Suicide in its US-premiere in 2020 at the Atlantic Theater Company. This production starred Carla Gugino (Carol), Celeste Arias (Anna), and granddaughter Gabby Beans (Bonnie).

In November 2025, Mohit Takalkar directed the Indian premier for the Prithvi Theatre Festival. The production starred Iranian actress Faezeh Jalali, Amba Jhala, and Mallika Singh as Carol, Anna, and Bonnie, respectively. Dipanita Nath for the Indian express writes, “the latest from one of the country's finest directors, Mohit Takalkar, Anatomy of a suicide plays on a stage marked like the game of knots and crosses, conversations from one era enter another, underlining the fluidity of time in generational trauma and the play keeps the audience in its grip, engaged and involved.”

== Awards and nominations ==
Birch won the 2018 Susan Smith Blackburn Prize for Anatomy of a Suicide.

== Analysis ==
Anatomy of a Suicide raises questions about the inheritance of suicide.
