= Mongolian State Academic Theatre of Opera and Ballet =

Opera house in Ulaanbaatar, Mongolia

- Улсын дуурь бүжгийн эрдмийн театр
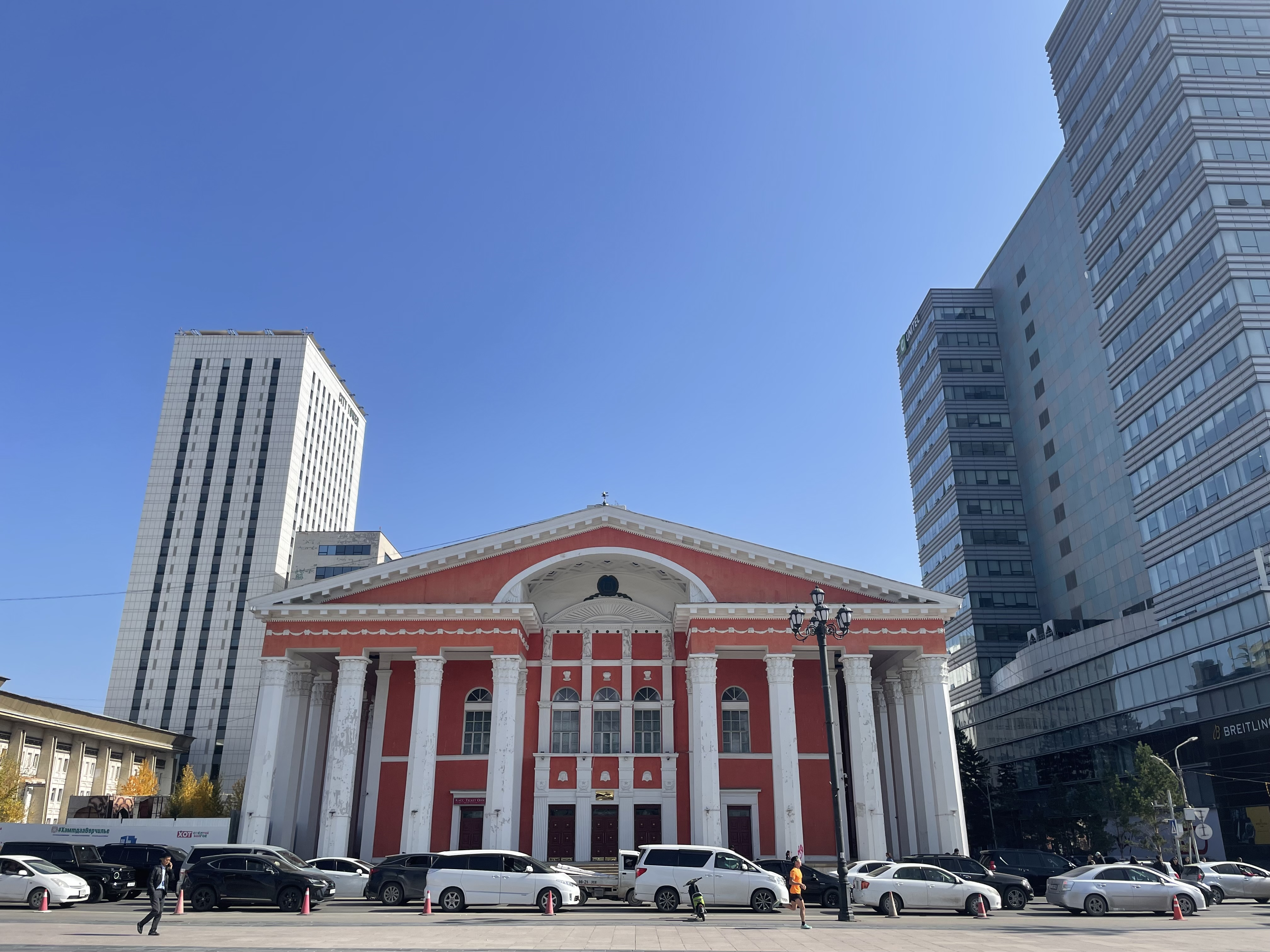
- Interactive map of Mongolian State Academic Theatre of Opera and Ballet
- Former names: State Musical Drama Theatre
- Address: Sükhbaatar, Ulaanbaatar; Mongolia
- Coordinates: 47°55′07″N 106°55′11″E
- Capacity: 500
- Type: theater

Construction
- Opened: 15 May 1963

The Mongolian State Academic Theatre of Opera and Ballet (Mongolian: Улсын дуурь бүжгийн эрдмийн театр; also known as the National Academic Theatre of Opera and Ballet) is a theater on the eastern side of Sükhbaatar Square in Sükhbaatar District. It was established on 15 May 1963 as the State Musical Drama Theatre. It was split into the State Academic Theatre of Opera and Ballet and the State Academic Drama Theatre upon the resolution 132/182 of 10 May 1963 by the Council of Ministers of the People's Republic of Mongolia and the Central Committee of Mongolian People's Revolutionary Party. The State Academic Theatre of Opera and Ballet held its opening ceremony on 18 May 1963 with Tchaikovsky’s Eugene Onegin.

== Architecture ==
The theater has a 500 seating capacity. It was constructed with neoclassical architectural style.

== Repertoire ==
The repertoire of State Academic Theatre of Opera and Ballet has more than 100 national and world classical works including 56 ballets and 54 operas. The operatic repertoire include world classic operas such as Mozart's Don Giovanni and The Magic Flute, Donizetti's Lucia di Lammermoor, Puccini's Turandot, La Bohème, and Tosca, Verdi's La traviata, Aida, and Rigoletto, Bizet's Carmen, Rossini's The Barber of Seville and Otello, Gounod's Faust, Borodin's Prince Igor, and Tchaikovsky's Eugene Onegin, as well as Mongolian operas such as B. Sharav's Chinggis Khaan, Kh. Bilegjargal's Tears of Lama, B. Damdinsuren's Strife, D. Luvsansharav's Bare Truth and Khara Khorum, D. Janchiv's Blue Silk Deel and Ts. Natsagdorj's Ogodei Khaan. State Without A Seal (Tamgagui Tur) was performed at the theatre before transferring to the London Coliseum under the title The Mongol Khan. The ballet repertoire include Tchaikovsky's Swan Lake and The Nutcracker, Shostakovich's The Limpid Stream, Pugni's La Esmeralda, Gounod's Walpurgisnacht, Asafyev's The Fountain of Bakhchisarai, Adam's Giselle and Le corsaire, and Prokofiev's Romeo and Juliet and Zolushka, as well as many Mongolian ballets including S. Gonchigsumlaa's Khoshuu Naadam, B. Damdinsuren's Lake Legend, Ts. Natsagdorj's Guyug Khaan, A. Batdelger's Geser Nomun Khaan, and Z. Khangal's Treasure Girls.

Currently more than 270 artists, staff and administrators are serving the Mongolian people with the national and world classical opera, ballet and music.

== Demolition controversy ==
The 2019 Mongolian government budget included items for the demolition of a number of neoclassical buildings in the centre of Ulaanbaatar, including the Opera and Ballet House. The decision was met by a public outcry and criticism from the Union of Mongolian Architects, which demanded that the building be preserved and restored. In January 2020, culture minister Yondonperenlein Baatarbileg denied that the government intended to demolish the buildings and stated that the government plans to renovate them instead.
