= We Want You to Watch =

2015 play by Alice Birch

- Written by: Alice Birch and RashDash
- Subject: Pornography

Premiere
- Date: 2015
- Place: Temporary Theatre (Royal National Theatre), London

We Want You to Watch is a 2015 play by Alice Birch developed with the theatre company, RashDash. The play is a feminist critique of pornography. We Want You to Watch premiered at the National Theatre's Temporary Theatre under the direction of Caroline Steinbeis.

== Development ==
RashDash, a feminist theatre company composed of Helen Goalen and Abbi Greenland, received funding from the West Yorkshire Playhouse to work with a playwright in developing a new work. They brought in Alice Birch to collaborate. We Want You to Watch was commissioned by The National Theatre and supported using public funding from the Arts Council England.

== Plot summary ==
Over the course of the play, two women named Pig and Sissy try to eradicate internet pornography. Pig and Sissy use extreme means to ban pornography and mitigate its harmful effects including kidnapping the Queen to get her to ban pornography and attempting to make an American hacker turn off the internet. Though the play critiques pornography, its characters maintain that it is "pro-sex."

== Production history ==
We Want You to Watch premiered in 2015 at the National Theatre's Temporary Theatre in London. The production was directed by Caroline Steinbeis and starred Goalen and Greenland as Pig and Sissy. The production also featured Bettrys Jones, Helena Lymbery, Lloyd Everitt, and Adam Charteris.

In 2019, the play was revived by the Bristol Old Vic Theatre School under the direction of Claire O’Reilly. That same year, the University of Greenwich's Bathway Theatre Company performed We Want You to Watch at the Edinburgh Fringe Festival.

== Critical reception ==
Reviewing the 2015 National Theatre's production, The Guardian's Michael Billington and The Independent's Paul Taylor both sympathised with the play's intentions, but felt that its uncompromising approach did not allow for a more nuanced critique of pornography.
