= Clean Break (theatre company) =

British theater company focused on women in prison

Clean Break is a women's theatre company based in London, focused on telling the stories of imprisoned women.

== History ==
Clean Break was started in 1979 by prisoners at HMP Askham Grange, who expanded the prison's annual Christmas show into Efemera, a two-hour show about prison life. It was later performed for a two-night run at York Arts Centre, which made its 21 cast members the first British prisoners to perform onstage outside of a prison. Upon their release, founders Jenny Hicks and Jackie Holboroug formed the theatre company, Clean Break, in order to tell the stories of women in prison. Prison reformer and former offender Chris Tchaikovsky wrote the play The Easter Egg for Clean Break, which was produced at the Edinburgh Fringe Festival in 1985.

In 1998 the company moved from its base in Camden to a refurbished building in Kentish Town.

== Productions ==
Productions include Sam Holcroft's Dancing Bears at the Soho Theatre, Little on the inside by Alice Birch at the Edinburgh Festival Fringe 2014, and Pests by Vivienne Franzmann (a co-production with Royal Court Theatre and Royal Exchange Theatre).

[BLANK], a play by Alice Birch, premiered at the Donmar Warehouse in October 2019.

In 2019 Inside Bitch was performed at Theatre Upstairs at The Royal Court Theatre.

In 2021, Typical Girls by Morgan Lloyd Malcolm ran at Sheffield Theatres, and in 2022 Favour by Ambreen Razia premiered at Bush Theatre.

Clean Break's first co-production with the National Theatre, Dixon and Daughters by Deborah Bruce, premiered in April 2023.

== Residencies ==
The company also organises residencies in women's prisons in the UK, using directors, playwrights, and actors to work with women in prison to create their own work.

The playwright Lucy Kirkwood was writer in residence at Clean Break in 2015.

== Recognition ==
Clean Break trustee Alice Millest was named Young Board Member of the Year at the 2014 Arts & Business Awards.

Clean Break were shortlisted for the Guardian Charity of the Year Awards in 2014 and received a Highly Commended Award from the Longford Trust.
