= John Man (author) =

British historian and travel writer (born 1941)

- Born: 15 May 1941 (age 85)
- Occupations: Historian; travel writer
- Spouse: Timberlake Wertenbaker (1991-present)
- Children: Jonathan Man, Thomas Man, Emily Man, Dushka Wertenbaker-Man
- Writing career
- Period: 1999–present
- Genres: Historical; travel writing
- Notable works: Genghis Khan; Kublai Khan

John Anthony Garnet Man (born 15 May 1941) is a British historian and travel writer. His special interests are China, Mongolia, and the history of written communication.

== Early life ==
Man studied German and French at Keble College, Oxford, before completing two postgraduate courses, a diploma in the History and Philosophy of Science at Oxford and Mongolian at the School of Oriental and African Studies, finishing the latter in 1968.

== Career ==
After working in journalism with Reuters and in publishing with Time Life Books, Man turned to writing, with occasional forays into film, TV, and radio.

In the 1990s, he began a series on the revolutions in writing: writing itself, the alphabet, and printing with movable type. This resulted in two books, Alpha Beta and The Gutenberg Revolution, both republished in 2009.

He returned to the subject of Mongolia with Gobi: Tracking the Desert, the first book on the region since the 1920s. Work in Mongolia led to Genghis Khan: Life, Death and Resurrection, published in 2004, which has so far appeared in 21 languages. Attila the Hun and Kublai Khan: The Mongol King Who Remade China, published in 2005 and 2006, respectively, completed a trilogy on Asian leaders.

In 2007 John Man was awarded Mongolia's Friendship Medal for his contributions to UK–Mongolian relations.

Man's 2007 book, The Terracotta Army, coincided with the British Museum exhibition (September 2007 – April 2008). This was followed by The Great Wall, published in 2008. The Leadership Secrets of Genghis Khan (2009) combines history and leadership theory. Xanadu: Marco Polo and the Discovery of the East was published in the autumn of 2009, and Samurai: The Last Warrior, the story of Saigō Takamori's doomed 1877 rebellion against the Japanese emperor, was published in February 2011.

The Mongol Empire (2014) tells the story of the world's greatest land empire, established by Genghis and taken to its fullest extent by his grandson Kublai. It develops two major themes touched on in previous books: the nature of the Mongols' ideology of world rule and the consequences for the modern world of Kublai's conquest of all China.

Also in 2014, Xanadu: Marco Polo and Europe's Discovery of the East was acquired by HarperCollins US, who retitled the book Marco Polo to accompany the 10-part Netflix original TV series Marco Polo.

He is married to writer Timberlake Wertenbaker. Together, they translated the English production of the Mongolian play The Mongol Khan.

== Bibliography ==
- The Birth of our Planet (1997)
- Gobi: Tracking the Desert (1997)
- Atlas of the Year 1000 (1999)
- Alpha Beta: How 26 Letters Shaped the Western World (2000)
- Comets, Meteors and Asteroids (2001)
- The Gutenberg Revolution: The Story of a Genius and an Invention That Changed the World (2003)
- Genghis Khan: Life, Death and Resurrection (2004)
- Attila: The Barbarian King Who Challenged Rome (2005); (reprint as Attila the Hun: A Barbarian King and the Fall of Rome, Bantam Books, 2006)
- Kublai Khan: The Mongol King Who Remade China (2006)
- The Terracotta Army: China's First Emperor and the Birth of a Nation (2007)
- The Great Wall: The Extraordinary Story of China's Wonder of the World (2008)
- Xanadu: Marco Polo and Europe's Discovery of the East (2009)
- The Leadership Secrets of Genghis Khan (2009)
- Samurai: The Last Warrior (2011)
- Ninja: 1,000 Years of the Shadow Warrior (2012)
- The Mongol Empire: The Conquests of Genghis Khan and the Making of Modern China (2014)
- Saladin: The Life, The Legend and the Islamic Empire (2015)
- The Amazons: The Real Warrior Women of the Ancient World (2017)
- Empire of Horses: The First Nomadic Civilization and the Making of China (2019)
- Conquering the North: China, Russia, Mongolia: 2,000 Years of Conflict (2025)
