= Dulguun Odkhuu =

Mongolian actress

- Одхүүгийн Дөлгөөн
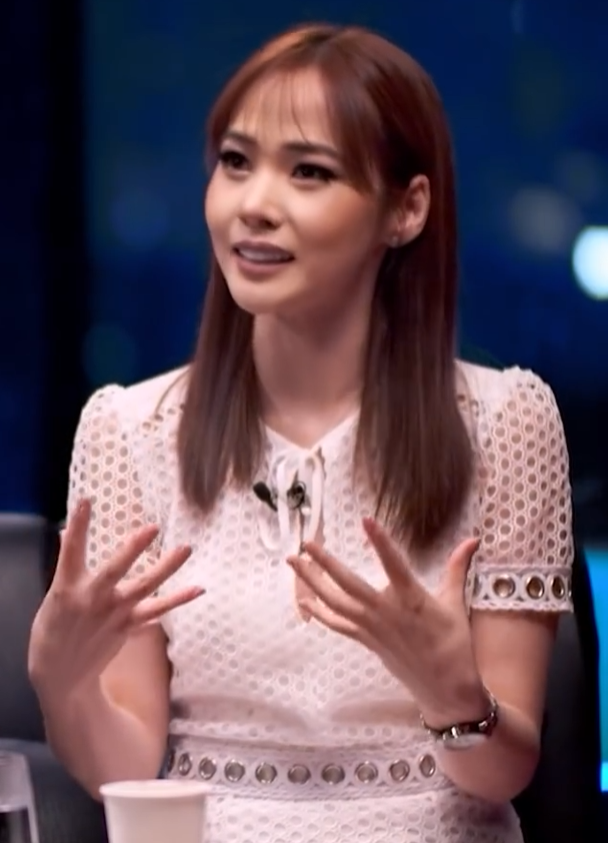
- Dulguun during an interview in 2021.
- Born: Dulguun Odkhuu; 5 June 1991 (age 35); Ulaanbaatar, Mongolia
- Citizenship: Mongolian
- Education: Academy of Art University, Mongolian National University of Arts and Culture
- Occupation: Actress
- Years active: 2011-present

Dulguun Odkhuu (Mongolian: Одхүүгийн Дөлгөөн, romanized: Odkhuugiin Dülgüün; born 5 June 1991 in Ulaanbaatar) is a Mongolian actress, a social influencer and a model. Her career began when she was studying acting at the Mongolian National University of Arts and Culture, and in 2011 she made her film debut in Amidrald Tavtai Moril. She played a leading role in The Mongol Khan, the first Mongolian theatrical production to be performed at the West End.

== Biography ==
Dulguun was born in Ulaanbaatar, Mongolia, on June 5, 1991, and spent most of her life there as one of three children. She completed the Fifth Secondary School in the Chingeltei district of Ulaanbaatar in 2008. Becoming an actress was her childhood dream, and having the Mongolian University of the Arts and Culture adjacent to her high school fueled her dreams even further. Upon completing secondary education, she studied at the Mongolian University of Arts and Culture from 2008 to 2012, focusing on film, acting, and drama. Earning her Bachelor's degree (BA). From 2017 to 2019, she earned a Master of Arts (MA) degree, majoring in Acting and Screenwriter, from the Academy of Art University in San Francisco, California.

Dulguun began her professional career with photo modeling, while studying acting in college. She made her film debut playing roles in Mongolian television series, such as Hairiin Ereld (2011) and Amidrald Tavtai Moril (2011). She had also been working as an actress at the Dream Theatre in Mongolia since 2011. After graduating from university in 2012, she continued to be an actress at private entertainment company Dream Theatre. Having gained more than two years of experience there and continuing to be cast in further performances, her stage roles led director N. Naranbaatar to handpick her to become an actress at the Mongolian Academic Drama Theatre. In 2017, Dulguun began pursuing a Master of Arts (MA) degree in acting and screenwriting at the Academy of Art University in San Francisco, California.

Dulguun rose to fame with her portrayal of Juliet in William Shakespeare's Romeo and Juliet play in 2015 at 24, making her the youngest actress to portray Juliet in Mongolia's theatre history. Following this she played Ophelia in Hamlet.

She rose to popularity again in 2022 by playing a lead role in a reproduction of a 1998 play by Lkhagvasuren Bavuu; this was later performed at the London Coliseum under the title The Mongol Khan—the first Mongolian play ever to be performed in the West End.

=== Film ===
In 2011, she starred as Maral in Neg Hoyoriin Guravaa. This was followed by portrayals of Gereltsetseg in Single Ladies-1 (2013) and Single Ladies-2 (2015). The sequel reached a large audience in Mongolia and influenced the further rise of her career. In the same year, she played the role of Siilegmaa in a Mongolian feature film, Mash Nuuts (2015). Mash Nuuts was the highest-grossing film in the first week after September 18, 2015. Dulguun also played the lead role of Solongo in the Mongolian comedy film Gatsuurkhan (2016).

While studying in the United States between 2017 and 2019, she starred in two major films during her summer holidays in Mongolia. She returned to the screens as Gereltsetseg in the "Single Ladies-3" (2017), as well as portraying the lead role of Od in Tengerees Buusan Od (2019).

=== Personal life ===
Dulguun divorced her husband. She was a supporter of the current Mongolian President Ukhnaagiin Khürelsükh during the 2021 Mongolian presidential election. Aside from her native Mongolian, she speaks English fluently and Russian to a limited degree.

== Performances ==
=== Film ===
Year	Title	Role	Film Company	Ref.
2007	Khana	Enkhjin	Face Studio	–
2010	Ezengui Bugj	Khaliunaa	Logic Film	
2011	Neg Hoyoriin Guravaa	Маral	Wizard Production	
2013	Single Ladies	Gereltsetseg	U Film	
2014	Suulchiin Shunu	Anirlan	Paramind Art, Tengri Concept	
2014	Uchral	Namuun	Aurora Film Production	
2015	Khamtran Amidragch	Buyanaa	Khuuk Film	
2015	Mash Nuuts	Siilegmaa	Fantastic Film	
2015	Single Ladies - 2	Gereltsetseg	U Film	
2016	Nudee Aniad Tusuul	Nandia	Expressive Line Production	
2017	Gatsuurkhan	Solongo	Mongol TV	
2017	Single Ladies - 3	Gereltsetseg	U Film	
2019	Tengerees Buusan Od	Od	Khuvisal Production	
2024	Tamerlane	Sarai	Netflix	

=== Television ===
Year	Title	Role	Network	Ref.
2011	Khairiin Ereld	Solongo	Edutainment TV	
2011	Amidrald Tavtai Moril	Zoloo	Mongolian National Broadcasting	

=== Theatre ===
Year	Title	Role	Theatre	Ref.
2011	Minii Nuuts Khuu	Enkhjin	Dream Theatre	–
2012	Khairtai Bol Ergej Haraarai	Sarantergel	Dream Theatre	
2012	Amidral Uuruu Beleg	Saruul	Dream Theatre	
2015	Buuvei	Nandia	National Academic Drama Theatre	
2015	Romeo and Juliet	Juliet	National Academic Drama Theatre	
2016	Hamlet	Ophelia	National Academic Drama Theatre	
2023	The Mongol Khan	Queen Consort Gerel	National Academic Drama Theatre, London Coliseum	

== Awards ==
Organization	Year	Work	Category	Result	Ref.
“Saint Musa-XIII” International Theatre Festival	2015	Romeo and Juliet	Best Actress in a Leading Role	Won	
Ministry of Education and Culture of Mongolia	2019	N/A	Cultural laureate of Mongolia	Won	
