= Skegness Grammar School =

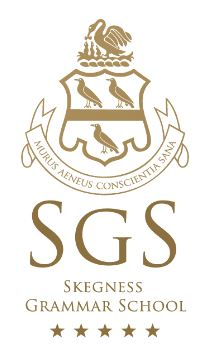

Location
- Vernon Road; Skegness, Lincolnshire, PE25 2QS; England; 53.1490°N 0.3340°E

Information
- Type: Grammar school Academy
- Motto: Latin: Murus Aeneus Conscientia Sana (A sound conscience is a wall of brass)
- Established: 1483; 543 years ago (1933 at current site)
- Founder: William de Waynflete
- Department for Education URN: 138757 Tables
- Ofsted: Reports
- Head teacher: Jude Hunton
- Gender: Coeducational
- Age: 11 to 19 (in certain cases)
- Enrolment: 670 pupils
- Houses: Lumley; Magdalen; Newton; Tennyson
- Colours: Bottle Green and Gold
- Website: http://www.skegnessgrammar.co.uk/

Skegness Grammar School (sometimes SGS) is a coeducational grammar school and sixth form with academy status, located in Skegness, Lincolnshire, England.

Selection to the school is by the eleven-plus examination by entry test or personal interview. The school roll consists of 472 pupils including 106 pupils in the sixth form.

Skegness Grammar School's roots go back over 500 years to the founding of Magdalen College School in Wainfleet. It was the first British secondary school to be awarded Grant Maintained status by the government in 1988. The school has been classed as a High Performing Specialist School.

== History ==
In 1483 William Waynflete, also called William of Wainfleet, later the Bishop of Winchester, Provost of Eton College and Lord High Chancellor of Great Britain founded Magdalen College School in his home town of Wainfleet to act as a satellite feeder school for Magdalen College at Oxford University that he had also founded.

In 1933, Magdalen College School, Wainfleet was closed. On the occasion of the school's final speech day, Magdalen College president, Dr G.S. Gordon put down the closure to the building of a new grammar school at Skegness. The Wainfleet school's headmaster, Kenneth Spendlove and many teaching staff made the decision to transfer to the new Skegness Grammar School. Over one hundred pupils from the College School also transferred to the new school after passing an entrance examination. To the disappointment of Skegness Council, the Wainfleet Exhibitions, a type of scholarship to Magdalen College School, Oxford would not be given to pupils of the grammar school.

Skegness Grammar School opened on Wednesday 20 September 1933, and cost £30,000 for 200 places. The headteacher was Kenneth George Spendlove. On Thursday 12 October 1933 it was officially opened by Sir Arthur Wallace Pickard-Cambridge. It opened for an entry of 220, being enlarged in the late 1950s to take around 400.

Around six children were transferred to the grammar school each year from the secondary modern schools in the 1960s.

By the early 1980s, the 1930s-era buildings were creaking. Sports facilities were sparse, as were adequate science laboratories. The Director of Education, Fred Rickard, said the school was the worst-equipped secondary school in the county.

The school competed against a team from Boston High School on Wednesday 14 September 1983 on Top of the Form on Radio 4. The team lost 65-58.

The BBC Radio 4 Any Questions? was broadcast from the school, on 3 November 1989, with David Willetts, Bea Campbell, Tom Sawyer, Baron Sawyer of NUPE, and John Rae (headmaster) of the Portman Group.

The boarding house opened in July 1991, Wainfleet Hall.

== School houses ==
The school is organised into four houses all named after historically prominent people or famous Lincolnshire men:

Lumley - after Aldred Lumley, 10th Earl of Scarbrough a major local landowner who was responsible for developing Skegness as a major Victorian holiday resort.

Magdalen - after the Magdalen College School in Wainfleet founded by William of Waynflete, one-time Bishop of Winchester and founder of the college by the same name at Oxford University.

Newton - after Lincolnshire's most famous son Sir Isaac Newton, FRS (4 January 1643 – 31 March 1727) who was an English physicist, mathematician, astronomer, natural philosopher, alchemist and theologian.

Tennyson - after locally born Alfred Lord Tennyson (6 August 1809 – 6 October 1892) who was Poet Laureate of the United Kingdom and one of the most popular classical English poets of all time.

== Status ==
=== Grant maintained ===
The Education Reform Act of 1988 introduced the concept of Grant-maintained schools which shifted the school funding away from the local education authority to direct grant support by central government. Skegness Grammar was the first school in the UK to both apply for and be awarded grant maintained status.

The grant maintained system was dis-established by the new Labour government in 1998 and schools were offered the choice of returning to local education authority funding or opting for foundation status.

=== Academy ===
The school converted to academy status on 1 September 2012, and is now sponsored by the David Ross Education Trust.

== Headteachers ==
- Ken Spendlove until July 1949, he was appointed to the former school in January 1924, and had attended the Duke of York's Royal Military School, and succeeded Rev William Gerrish; he died aged 85 on Friday 28 April 1978 in Northamptonshire
- September 1949, Cyril George Ferguson, appointed 10 May 1949; he was a wartime naval officer, from Holloway; a physics teacher; he was a Lieutenant-Commander, and deep sea diver, in mine disposal in the Mediterranean Sea; he lived at 86 Briar Way; his wife taught at Lumley Secondary Modern School; he left in March 1957, and moved to the new Westlain Mixed Grammar School in Sussex from September 1957
- 1957, Miss Lily Parkes, headmistress for four months, joined in 1942, head of Maths, deputy head from 1951, she retired as deputy head in December 1975; she started the school annual cruise; she became a Conservative councillor on Lincolnshire County Council for Skegness South from July 1978, serving on the education committee; she died aged 81 in May 1992 in the Pilgrim Hospital
- September 1957, Joseph Eric Bailey, deputy head of Forest Fields Grammar School in Nottinghamshire; he was appointed in June 1957; he had attended Spalding Grammar School, and had started teaching in 1941; he lived at Skendleby; he was an English teacher, who had attended St John's College, Cambridge; his wife Melita died on 26 January 1989, who had attended Spalding High School; he died on 6 September 1994, aged 76
- January 1981, John Webster, from Liverpool, he attended Liverpool Institute High School for Boys, when Paul McCartney was a prefect; a geography teacher he left in March 1997

== Notable alumni ==
- Air Vice-Marshal Dudley Graham Bailey CBE, Station Commander from 1968-70 of RAF Wildenrath, former head boy
- Noël Greig, playwright and gay rights campaigner.
- Tom Jarvis, Commonwealth Games table tennis player
- Debbie Jenner (Doris D), dancer in the Netherlands
- Mark Johnson (announcer), sports broadcaster
- Neil Wallis, former deputy editor of the News of the World, former editor of the Sunday People.
- Robin Hunter-Clarke, Chief of Staff to the UK Independence Party in the National Assembly for Wales and Chief of Staff to Neil Hamilton.

=== Former teachers ===
- John Littlewood (chess player) taught French and Maths from 1955–67; he ran the school chess team
- Peter Scupham
