= (BLANK) =

2019 play by Alice Birch

[BLANK]
- Written by: Alice Birch

Premiere
- Date: October 17, 2019
- Place: Donmar Warehouse, London

[BLANK] is a 2019 play by Alice Birch. The play consists of 100 unrelated scenes from which a director may pick and choose. Its 2019 premiere at the Donmar Warehouse in London was in celebration of the fortieth anniversary of Clean Break.

== Development ==
The play's 100 scenes run over 400 pages and all explore what happens when and after a woman goes to prison. Birch's writing was inspired by her work with Clean Break and women affected by the criminal justice system.

== Production history ==
Prior to the play's official premiere, the National Theatre's youth festival Connections staged a version of [BLANK] in 2018.

Maria Aberg directed the premiere of [BLANK] at the Donmar Warehouse in London, which officially began its run on October 17, 2019. This production was produced by the theatre company, Clean Break, which works with women affected by the prison system, and celebrated their fortieth anniversary. The premiere featured an all-female cast and creative team. The actors were Ayesha Antoine, Shona Babayemi, Sophia Brown, Jackie Clune, Grace Doherty, Lucy Edkins, Zaris-Angel Hator, Zainab Hasan, Joanna Horton, Thusitha Jayasundera, Petra Letang, Leah Mondesir-Simmonds, Kate O'Flynn, Ashna Rabheru, Jemima Rooper, and Taya Tower. Twenty-two of the 100 scenes were performed. The production featured a two-tiered set design by Rosie Elnile.

Cambridge University's Fletcher Players staged [BLANK] in 2021. Director Rae Morris made the play into an online radio play. In 2022, [BLANK] was staged at the Badischen Staatstheater Karlsruhe. Director Anna Bergmann chose 35 scenes. It was staged in Sweden at the Royal Dramatic Theatre. Director Maria Åberg selected 24 scenes.

== Analysis ==
The pick-and-choose structure of the 100 scenes is reminiscent of Caryl Churchill.

== Awards and nominations ==
[BLANK] was nominated for the 2020 James Tait Black Prize.
