= Katie Mitchell =

British theatre director (born 1964)

Katie Mitchell OBE
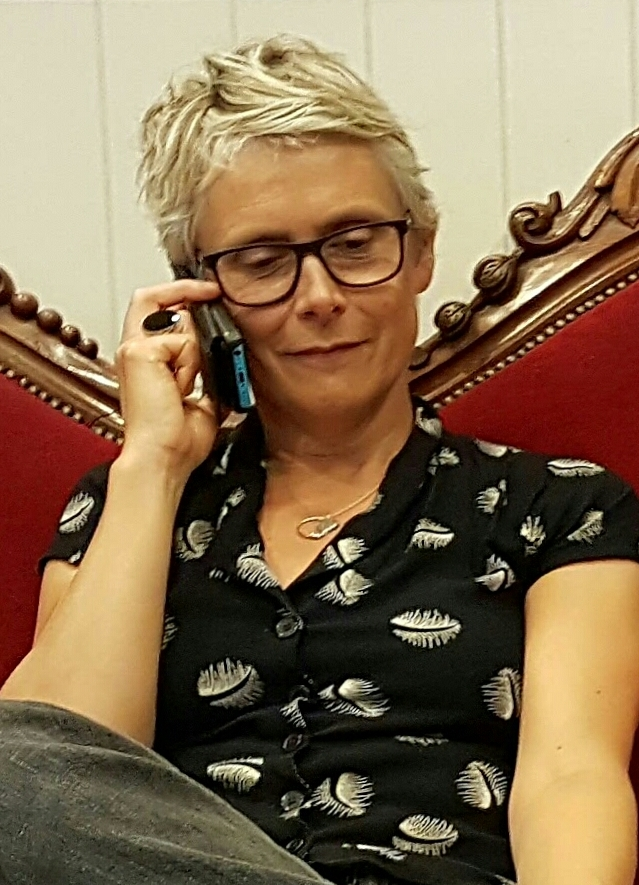
- Katie Mitchell in 2016
- Born: Katrina Jane Mitchell; 23 September 1964 (age 62); Reading, Berkshire, England
- Education: Magdalen College, Oxford
- Occupation: Theatre director

Katrina Jane Mitchell OBE (born 23 September 1964) is an English theatre director.

== Life and career ==
Mitchell was born in Reading, Berkshire, raised in Hermitage, Berkshire, and educated at Oakham School. Upon leaving Oakham, she went up to Magdalen College, Oxford, to read English.

She began her career behind the scenes at the King's Head Theatre in London before taking on work as an assistant director at theatre companies including Paines Plough (1987) and the Royal Shakespeare Company (RSC) (1988–1989). Early in her career in the 1990s, she directed five early productions under the umbrella of her company Classics On A Shoestring, including Women of Troy for which she won a Time Out Award.

In 1989, she was awarded a Winston Churchill Travel Fellowship to study director's training in Russian, Georgia, Lithuania and Poland and the work she saw there, including productions by Lev Dodin, Eimuntas Nekrosius and Anatoly Vasiliev, influenced her own practice for the next twenty years.

In 1996, Mitchell started directing operas at Welsh National Opera where she directed four productions, including Handel's Jephtha and Jancek's Jenůfa. Since then, she has directed operas at houses, including the Royal Opera House, English National Opera, Glyndebourne, the Salzburg Festival, Berlin State Opera, the Royal Danish Opera, Opéra-Comique (Paris), Geneva Opera and the Aix-en-Provence Festival.

Mitchell was an Associate Director at the Royal Shakespeare Company between 1996 and 1998. In 1997, Mitchell became responsible for programming at The Other Place, the RSC's former black box theatre. While at the RSC she directed nine productions, including The Phoenician Women which won her the Evening Standard Award for Best Director in 1996. Between 2000 and 2003 she was an Associate Director at the Royal Court Theatre and between 2003 and 2011 she was an Associate of the Royal National Theatre.

In 2005, she directed a work combining Beethoven's late string quartets and T. S. Eliot's Four Quartets.

She has directed thirteen productions for the Royal Court, including Ten Billion (2012) and 2071 (2014) about the climate emergency, an issue she is passionate about. Recent productions at the Royal Court include her ongoing collaboration with the writer Alice Birch on Ophelia's Zimmer (Ophelia's Room) and Anatomy of a Suicide.

At the National Theatre, she has directed eighteen productions, the most innovative being an adaptation of Virginia Woolf's novel, The Waves, where she combined theatre making with the use of live video, creating a form later called 'live cinema'.

The live cinema work was subsequently developed in Germany and France. She has directed more than 15 live cinema productions in the UK, Austria, Germany and France, at theatres like the Schaubühne (Berlin) and the Schauspielhaus in Cologne, and these pieces have toured the world including Greece, Russia, China, Portugal and Brazil.

Whilst at the National Theatre, Mitchell pioneered children's theatre for primary school age theatre goers, including an adaptation of Dr. Seuss's The Cat in the Hat. Her interest in this age group also led her to initiate English National Opera's first ever opera commission for a primary school audience – an adaptation of Oliver Jeffers' book, The Way Back Home.

From 2008, Mitchell started working regularly on mainland Europe in Germany, Holland, France, Denmark and Austria. Her first production for the Cologne Schauspielhaus, Wunschkonzert, earned her a place at the Theatertreffen in Berlin and since then she has directed four productions for the Cologne Schauspielhaus, seven for the Schaubühne theatre, Berlin, and six for the Hamburg Schauspielhaus. She has also worked at the Toneelgroep, Amsterdam, and twice at the Bouffes du Nord, Paris. She is a resident director at the Schaubühne theatre, Berlin, the Hamburg Schauspielhaus and had a seven-year artist-in-residency at the Aix-en-Provence Festival. In 2015 the Stadsschouwburg theatre in Amsterdam held a retrospective of her opera and theatre work, presenting eight productions from across Europe.

In 2009, Mitchell published The Director's Craft: A Handbook for the Theatre (Routledge), her practical manual to help emerging directors learn how to direct. She also published two books based on her live cinema productions – …some trace of her and Waves, both in 2008. Mitchell has also directed installations, including Five Truths at the Victoria and Albert Museum. In 2011 The Department of Theatre and Performance at the V&A invited Mitchell and Leo Warner of 59 Productions to conceive and produce a video installation exploring the nature of 'truth in performance'. Taking as its inspiration 5 of the most influential European theatre directors of the last century, the project examines how each of the practitioners would direct the actress playing Ophelia in the 'mad' scenes in Shakespeare's Hamlet. This multiscreen video installation, launched at the Chantiers Europe festival at the Théâtre de la Ville in Paris on 4 June, and opened at the V&A on 12 July 2011.

In a career spanning thirty years, Mitchell has directed over 100 shows – over 70 theatre productions and nearly 30 operas. She is currently a Professor of Theatre Directing at Royal Holloway, University of London, where she teaches on an MA in directing. Other academic positions include:

- Cultural Fellow at King's College, London 2015–present
- Honorary Fellow at Rose Bruford College, London 2014
- Visiting Fellow at Central St Martins, London 2016–2018
- Visiting Professor of Opera at Oxford University 2017

== Reputation ==
Mitchell has been described as "a director who like no other" and "the closest thing the British theatre has to an auteur". In 2007, the artistic director of the NT accused the British press of affording Mitchell's productions "misogynistic reviews, where everything they say is predicated on her sex".

Her productions have been described as "distinguished by the intensity of the emotions, the realism of the acting, and the creation of a very distinctive world" and accused of "a willful disregard for classic texts", but Mitchell suggests that while "there's a signature in every director's work", it is not her intent to work to a "strong personal signature".

At the beginning of her career, Mitchell's process involved long and intensive rehearsal periods and use of Stanislavski's system. She regularly involves psychiatry in looking at characters, and in 2004 directed a series of workshops on Stanislavski and neuroscience at the NT studio. Since her 2006 play Waves, she has also experimented with video projections in a number of productions.

In 2016 Mitchell was described as "British theatre's Queen in exile" and a director who "provokes strong reactions". Some see her "as a vandal, ripping apart classic texts and distorting them to her own dubious purpose" and others "consider her to be the most important British director of theatre and opera at work today – indeed, among the greatest in the world".

== Personal life ==
She has a daughter Edie, born 2005.

== Selected directing credits ==
- 1994: Rutherford and Son by Githa Sowerby
- 1995: The Machine Wreckers (Die Maschinenstürmer) by Ernst Toller
- 1996: The Phoenician Women by Euripides
- 1996: Don Giovanni by Mozart
- 1998: Jenůfa, an opera by Janáček
- 1998: Uncle Vanya, a version by David Lan of Anton Chekhov's play
- 2000: The Oresteia, a version by Ted Hughes from Aeschylus
- 2000: The Country, by Martin Crimp
- 2001: Káťa Kabanová, an opera by Janáček
- 2002: Ivanov by Chekhov
- 2003: Jephtha, an oratorio by Handel
- 2003: Three Sisters by Anton Chekhov
- 2004: The Turn of the Screw (film), opera by Britten
- 2004: Iphigenia in Aulis by Euripides
- 2005: A Dream Play by Strindberg
- 2006: The Seagull, a version by Martin Crimp of Anton Chekhov's play
- 2006: Waves, based on Virginia Woolf's novel The Waves
- 2007: Attempts on Her Life by Martin Crimp
- 2007: Women of Troy by Euripides
- 2008: The City by Martin Crimp
- 2008: ...Some Trace of Her inspired / based on The Idiot by Fyodor Dostoyevsky
- 2008: The Maids by Genet, Sweden
- 2009: Wunschkonzert by Franz Xaver Kroetz, Schauspiel Köln, Cologne, Germany
- 2009: After Dido based on Dido and Aeneas by Purcell (for English National Opera at the Young Vic)
- 2009: Pains of Youth, a version by Martin Crimp of Ferdinand Bruckner's play Krankheit der Jugend at the National Theatre
- 2009: Parthenogenesis, an opera by James MacMillan and Michael Symmons Roberts at the Royal Opera House
- 2009: The Cat in the Hat by Dr. Seuss at the National Theatre and at the Young Vic
- 2010: Idomeneo by Mozart at English National Opera
- 2010: Fräulein Julie after Strindberg at the Schaubühne, Berlin, Germany
- 2010: Beauty And The Beast by Lucy Kirkwood at the National Theatre
- 2011: Clemency, an opera by James MacMillan and Michael Symmons Roberts at the Royal Opera House
- 2011: Die Wellen based on Virginia Woolf's The Waves at Schauspiel Köln, Cologne
- 2011: Wastwater by Simon Stephens at the Royal Court Theatre, London
- 2011: A Woman Killed With Kindness by Thomas Heywood at the National Theatre, London
- 2012: The Trial of Ubu Roi by Simon Stephens at the Hampstead Theatre, London
- 2012: Written on Skin by George Benjamin, libretto by Martin Crimp, at the Grand Théâtre de Provence during the Aix-en-Provence Festival
- 2012: Die Ringe des Saturn by W. G. Sebald at the Avignon Festival
- 2012: Ten Billion by Katie Mitchell and Stephen Emmott at the Avignon Festival
- 2012: Reise Durch Die Nacht by Friederike Mayröcker at Schauspiel Köln, Cologne
- 2013: Le Vin herbé by Frank Martin at Berlin State Opera
- 2013: The House Taken Over by Vasco Mendonça at the Aix-en-Provence Festival
- 2013: Alles Weitere Kennen Sie aus dem Kino a version by Martin Crimp of Euripides' The Phoenician Women at the Deutsches Schauspielhaus, Hamburg
- 2013: Die gelbe Tapete by Charlotte Perkins Gilman at the Schaubühne, Berlin
- 2013: Atmen by Duncan Macmillan at Schaubühne, Berlin
- 2014: Wunschloses Unglück by Handke at Burgtheater, Vienna
- 2014: The Forbidden Zone by Duncan Macmillan, Salzburg Festival
- 2015: Glückliche Tage by Beckett at Deutsches Schauspielhaus, Hamburg
- 2015: Alcina by Handel at Festival d'Aix-en-Provence (Streaming-Live, Blu-ray/DVD released in 2016)
- 2015: Reisende auf einem Bein by Herta Müller at Deutsches Schauspielhaus, Hamburg
- 2016: Cleansed by Sarah Kane at the Royal National Theatre, London
- 2016: Lucia di Lammermoor by Donizetti at Royal Opera House
- 2016: Neither by Morton Feldman at Berlin State Opera
- 2016: Schatten (Eurydice sagt) by Elfriede Jelinek at Schaubühne, Berlin
- 2016: Pelléas et Mélisande by Debussy at Festival d'Aix-en-Provence (Streaming-Live)
- 2017: Anatomy of a Suicide by Alice Birch at Royal Court Theatre
- 2019: Orlando by Virginia Woolf with the Schaubühne, Berlin
- 2021: little scratch by Rebecca Watson (adapted by Miriam Battye) at Hampstead Theatre

== Accolades ==
=== Honours ===
Mitchell was appointed Officer of the Order of the British Empire (OBE) in the 2009 New Year Honours for services to drama.

In 2011, she was awarded the Europe Prize Theatrical Realities, in Saint Petersburg.

In September 2017, she was awarded the President's Medal of the British Academy "for her work to enhance the presentation of classic and contemporary theatre and opera through innovative new production".

=== Awards ===
- Churchill fellowship, 1989
- Time Out Award 1991 for Arden of Faversham and Women of Troy (UK)
- Evening Standard Best Director Award 1996 (UK)
- The Theatertreffen Prize 2008 (Germany)
- The Theatertreffen Prize 2009 (Germany)
- An OBIE Best Production Award in 2009 (USA)
- Europe Theatre Prize – Europe Prize Theatrical Realities, 2011 (Europe)
- Golden Mask Award for Best Foreign Production for Fraulein Julie in 2011 (Russia)
- The Best Production Reumert Prize for The Seagull in 2012 (Denmark)
- The Best Director Nestroy Prize for Reise durch die Nacht in 2013 (Austria)
- The Stanislavsky International Prize 2014 (Russia)
- British Academy President's Medal in 2017: for her work to enhance the presentation of classic and contemporary theatre and opera through innovative new productions. (UK)
- The Tonic Award in 2018: for her representations of women and nurture of female talent in (UK)
- Golden Mask Award for Best Opera Director for her production of Alcina in 2019 (Russia)
- Best Director 2019 for International Opera Awards (UK)
