= Alice Birch =

British playwright and screenwriter

- Born: 1986 (age 39–40)
- Education: University of Exeter
- Occupation: Writer
- Partner: Sam Pritchard
- Children: 2
- Writing career
- Notable works: Lady Macbeth; Revolt. She Said. Revolt Again.; Anatomy of a Suicide; Normal People; We Want You to Watch; [BLANK]
- Notable awards: George Devine Award; Susan Smith Blackburn Prize; British Independent Film Award for Best Screenplay

Alice Birch (born 1986) is a British playwright and screenwriter. Birch has written several plays, including Revolt. She Said. Revolt Again. for which she was awarded the George Devine Award for Most Promising New Playwright, and Anatomy of a Suicide for which she won the Susan Smith Blackburn Prize. Birch was also the screenwriter for the film Lady Macbeth and has written for such television shows as Succession, Normal People, and the Peabody Award-winning miniseries Dead Ringers.

== Early life and education ==
Birch spent the first five years of her life living with her family at the rural commune Birchwood Hall, near Malvern. Because her parents were unmarried, they decided to give Alice and her sister the surname Birch after the commune's name.

At 18, Birch joined the Royal Court Theatre’s young writers programme and spent a three-month unpaid internship in Los Angeles working for the film production company BenderSpink.

Birch attended Exeter University for her undergraduate degree.

== Career ==
In 2010, Birch participated in 24 Hour Plays at the Old Vic in which writers, directors, actors, and other creatives have 24 hours to create a new play before it is performed. The playwrights were given 6 hours to write a play 15 minutes in length. Birch's play was called And Then There Were Four Little Beats of Four Little Hearts on the Edge of the World.

Birch's first performed full-length play was Many Moons, which premiered in 2011 at Theatre 503 under the direction of Derek Bond. The play follows four characters whose lives seem separate, but then collide. Birch was nominated for the 2011/12 Susan Smith Blackburn prize, an award recognising female playwrights writing in the English language, for Many Moons.

In 2013, Birch's episode of the radio comedy Absolutely Delish was broadcast on BBC Radio 4. Also in 2013, Birch's play Little on the Inside premiered at Latitude Festival. The play is set inside a women's prison.

Birch co-wrote the play Astronauts with a group of 16-19 year olds who later performed the work. Astronauts was inspired by the housing crisis. The play premiered in 2014 with Company Three. Little Light is one of Birch's first plays, though it was not performed until 2015 when it premiered at the Orange Tree Theatre.

Birch's play Revolt. She Said. Revolt Again. was commissioned by the Royal Shakespeare Company, which gave her the prompt, "Well-behaved women seldom make history". Birch wrote the play in three days. The play was inspired by Valerie Solanas' SCUM Manifesto, though Birch took inspiration more from the power behind Solanas' words than from the messages of that work. Revolt premiered with the Royal Shakespeare Company in 2014 as part of Midsummer Mischief. Birch was nominated for the 2014/15 Susan Smith Blackburn prize for writing Revolt and won the George Devine Award for Most Promising New Playwright.

In 2015, Birch developed the play We Want You to Watch with the feminist theatre company RashDash. We Want You to Watch was commissioned by the National Theatre. The play protests the violent and graphic world created by pornography and raises the idea of getting rid of pornography in its entirety. The same year, her play for children, The Lone Pine Club, premiered as a touring production. Birch adapted the story from Malcolm Saville's children's books.

Birch's Ophelias Zimmer (Ophelia's Room, in English) premiered at the Schaubühne in Berlin in December 2015. The play made its debut in England in early 2016 but was performed in German with English surtitles. Ophelias Zimmer explores the character of Ophelia from William Shakespeare's Hamlet. The play was a collaboration between Birch, director Katie Mitchell, and designer Chloe Lamford. Ophelias Zimmer was nominated for the Friedrich-Luft Preis.

In 2016, Birch made her screenwriting debut with the film Lady Macbeth, based on Nikolai Leskov's novel Lady Macbeth Of The Mtsensk District. Birch made several changes from the novel, including setting the film in rural England. Birch won a 2017 British Independent Film Award for best screenplay for Lady Macbeth. Birch was also nominated for a BAFTA and for Best Debut Screenwriter at the British Independent Film Awards for Lady Macbeth.

In 2016, it was announced that Birch would pen the TV-adaptation of Mary Gabriel's Love and Capital, a biography of the Karl Marx and the Marx family. There have been no further announcements about this television series. Also that year, Birch and British director Katie Mitchell adapted Elfriede Jelinek's Schatten (Eurydike sagt) (Shadow (Eurydice Speaks) in English).

In 2017, Birch's play Anatomy of a Suicide premiered at the Royal Court Theatre in London under the direction of Katie Mitchell. Anatomy of a Suicide won Birch the 2018 Susan Smith Blackburn Prize. Anatomy of a Suicide follows three generations of women affected by mental illness in the 1970s, 1990s, and the 2030s whose stories are presented to the audience simultaneously. Birch was interested in exploring the effects of having a mother who commits suicide and whether trauma can be passed on through DNA.

In 2018, Birch adapted Marguerite Duras' novella La Maladie de la Mort (or, in English, The Malady of Death) for the stage. The play premiered at the Edinburgh Fringe Festival that year and was directed by Katie Mitchell.

[BLANK] was co-commissioned by National Theatre Connections and Clean Break. The play consists of 100 mix-and-match scenes, comprising over 400 pages, which a production is to choose from. The scenes are vignettes about women and the criminal justice system. The 2019 premiere of [BLANK] at the Donmar Warehouse with Clean Break performed 22 of the 100 scenes.

In 2019, Birch adapted Virginia Woolf's Orlando into German. The adaptation was performed at the Schaubühne and directed by Katie Mitchell.

Birch adapted Sally Rooney's novel Normal People for television with Rooney herself and writer Mark O'Rowe. The Normal People TV series was released in April 2020. Before the release of Normal People, it was announced that Birch would also adapt Rooney's novel Conversations with Friends for television.

Birch's opera, Violet, composed by Tom Coult, was scheduled to open at the Aldeburgh Festival in June 2020. The opera was commissioned and produced by Music Theatre Wales, Theater Magdeburg, and Snape Maltings, with the London Sinfonietta. The two created Violet in 2019. The opera's premiere was delayed because of the COVID-19 pandemic, eventually taking place at Aldeburgh in June 2022. Jude Christian's production starred soprano Anna Dennis as Violet with accompaniment by the London Sinfonietta conducted by Andrew Gourlay. The production went on to tour the UK. Coult’s score received an Ivor Novello Award nomination at The Ivors Classical Awards 2023 for Best Stage Work.

Birch has worked with director Katie Mitchell many times. Mitchell has directed Birch's Ophelias Zimmer, Anatomy of a Suicide, and La Maladie de la Mort. In October 2020, her adaptation of Rachel Cusk's Outline trilogy was set to be directed by Mitchell at the National Theatre. The production was indefinitely postponed due to the COVID-19 pandemic.

Birch adapted Graham Swift's 2016 novel Mothering Sunday. The film of the same name premiered at the 2021 Cannes Film Festival. In August 2020, it was announced that Birch would write the television reimagining of Dead Ringers, set to star Rachel Weisz. The miniseries went on to win a Peabody Award for "aptly packaging a bold adaptation of this twinned-body horror classic within the continued nightmarish world of women’s reproductive health care in the United States."

In 2022, The Wonder, for which Birch co-wrote the screenplay with Sebastián Lelio and Emma Donoghue, adapted from Donoghue's novel of the same name, premiered. She adapted Federico García Lorca’s 1936 play, The House of Bernarda Alba, for the English stage, centring the character Bernarda's daughters. The adaptation premiered at the National Theatre's Lyttelton Theatre in 2023 under the direction of Rebecca Frecknall.

== Personal life ==
Birch lives in Hackney, East London with her partner Sam Pritchard and their two children.

== Works ==
=== Plays ===
- Many Moons
- Little on the Inside
- Astronauts
- Little Light
- Revolt. She Said. Revolt Again.
- We Want You to Watch
- The Lone Pine Club
- Ophelias Zimmer (German with English surtitles)
- Anatomy of a Suicide
- La Maladie de la Mort (French with English subtitles)
- [BLANK]
- The House of Bernarda Alba (adapted from the Federico García Lorca’s 1936 play)
- Outline. Transit. Kudos.
- Romans: A Novel.

=== Film ===
- Lady Macbeth (2016)
- Mothering Sunday (2021)
- The Wonder (2022)
- The End We Start From (2023)
- Die My Love (2025)
- Sweetsick (TBA) (Directorial debut)

=== Television ===
- Succession — Season 2 (2019)
- Normal People (2020)
- Conversations with Friends (2022)
- Dead Ringers (2023)
- The Ministry of Time (in development)

== Awards ==
Year	Award	Category	Work	Result	Notes	Refs
2011/12	Susan Smith Blackburn Prize		Many Moons	Nominated		
2014	Arts Foundation Futures Award	Playwriting		Won		
2014	George Devine Award for Most Promising New Playwright		Revolt. She Said. Revolt Again.	Won	Co-winner with Rory Mullarkey	
2014/15	Susan Smith Blackburn Prize		Revolt. She Said. Revolt Again.	Nominated		
2015	Friedrich-Luft-Preis		Ophelias Zimmer	Nominated		
2017	British independent film awards	Best screenplay	Lady Macbeth	Won		
2017	British independent film awards	Best Debut Screenwriter	Lady Macbeth	Nominated		
2018	BAFTA	Outstanding debut by a British writer, director or producer	Lady Macbeth	Nominated	with William Oldroyd (director) and Fodhla Cronin O’Reilly (producer)	
2018	Susan Smith Blackburn Prize		Anatomy of a Suicide	Won		
2020	Writers Guild of America Awards	Drama Series	Succession	Won	with Jesse Armstrong, Jon Brown, Jonathan Glatzer, Cord Jefferson, Mary Laws, Lucy Prebble, Georgia Pritchett, Tony Roche, Gary Shteyngart, Susan Soon He Stanton, and Will Tracy	
2020	Primetime Emmy Awards	Outstanding Writing for a Limited Series	Normal People	Nominated	with Sally Rooney for "Episode 3"	
2020	James Tait Black Prize		[BLANK]	Nominated		
2022	EDA Best of Awards	Best Screenplay, Adapted	The Wonder	Nominated	with Emma Donoghue, Sebastian Lelio	
2022	EDA Female Focus Awards	Best Woman Screenwriter	The Wonder and Mothering Sunday	Nominated		
2023	British Academy Film Awards	BAFTA Award for Outstanding British Film	The Wonder	Nominated	with Sebastián Lelio, Ed Guiney, Juliette Howell, Andrew Lowe, Tessa Ross, and Emma Donoghue	
2023	Gotham Independent Film Awards	Gotham Independent Film Award for Breakthrough Series – Long Form	Dead Ringers	Nominated		
2024	Peabody Awards	"For aptly packaging a bold adaptation of this twinned-body horror classic within the continued nightmarish world of women’s reproductive health care in the United States"	Dead Ringers	Won		

== See also ==
- List of British playwrights since 1950
