= Revolt. She Said. Revolt Again. =

2014 feminist play by Alice Birch

- Written by: Alice Birch

Premiere
- Date premiered: 2014
- Place premiered: The Other Place

Revolt. She Said. Revolt Again. is a feminist play by Alice Birch, commissioned by the Royal Shakespeare Company and first performed in 2014. The play had its off-Broadway premiere in 2016. It was the co-winner of the 2014 George Devine Award for Most Promising New Playwright and was nominated for the 2014/15 Susan Smith Blackburn Prize.

== Synopsis ==
Revolt. She Said. Revolt Again. presents thirteen stand-alone scenes or vignettes over four acts. The scenes begin with a dialogue between a man and woman discussing sex as she takes control of his education. Then, another couple discuss marriage after a rejected proposal. A woman and her employer discuss work obligations as the woman wishes to take Mondays off. Then a shopper strips naked in a grocery store after a sexual assault. A woman and her non-verbal daughter address the woman's mother's absence from their lives. Following this scene, the play becomes more abstract as scenes blend into each other, including critiques of pornography, a salesperson selling T-shirts with feminist slogans, and a person selling hymens. The final scene discusses the future, overthrowing systems and eradicating all men.

== Development ==
The Royal Shakespeare Company commissioned Birch to write the play and provided her with the prompt, "Well-behaved women seldom make history". Birch also took inspiration from Valerie Solanas' SCUM Manifesto, as well as feminist writers such as Kat Banyard, Caitlin Moran, Andrea Dworkin. She wrote the play in three days.

== Performance history ==
Revolt. She Said. Revolt Again premiered in 2014 at The Other Place as part of the Royal Shakespeare Company's Midsummer Mischief. The production starred Robert Boulter, Scarlett Brookes, Ruth Gemmell, and Mimi Ndiweni. The RSC revived their production in 2016 as part of Making Mischief.

In 2016, Revolt. opened off-Broadway at Soho Rep under the direction of Lileana Blain-Cruz. This production starred Daniel Abeles, Molly Bernard, Eboni Booth, and Jennifer Ikeda. This production marked Birch's US-debut. Revolt. had its New England premiere that same year with Company One in Boston at the Plaza Theatre at Boston Center for the Arts under the direction of Summer L. Williams.

Revolt. has its Australian premiere at Malthouse Theatre in Melbourne in 2017 under the direction of Janice Muller. In 2018, Revolt. was performed in Dallas by Second Thought Theatre. In 2020, the University of British Columbia's Film and Theatre Department staged the play.

In 2021, Revolt. was performed at Duke University through student group Duke Players and directed by Sarah Larkin.

== Awards and nominations ==
Year	Award	Result	Notes	Refs
2014	George Devine Award for Most Promising New Playwright	Won	Co-winner with Rory Mullarkey	
2014/15	Susan Smith Blackburn Prize	Nominated		
