= Chris Tchaikovsky =

British social activist (1944–2002)

- Born: 28 May 1944; Cornwall, United Kingdom
- Died: 19 May 2002 (aged 57)
- Resting place: Buckland Monachorum, Devon, United Kingdom
- Occupation: Prisoner rights activist
- Years active: 1983–2002
- Organization: Women in Prison

Chris Ryder-Tchaikovsky (28 May 1944 – 19 May 2002) was a British social activist. After serving a custodial prison sentence at HM Prison Holloway during the 1970s, she became an activist for the reform of the criminal justice system for women, and in 1984 co-founded Women in Prison, a charity supporting incarcerated women.

== Biography ==
=== Early life and criminality ===
Tchaikovsky was born into a middle-class family in Cornwall and was one of six children. She struggled in school, and moved to Plymouth and later to London during the 1960s. While in London, Tchaikovsky became the leader of a criminal gang known as the Happy Family who committed crimes including cashing cheques and traveller's cheques with forged identification. She was eventually caught and charged with fraud, and on 22 October 1973 was sentenced to serve 15 months' imprisonment at HM Prison Holloway. During Tchaikovsky's time in prison, a fellow inmate, Patricia Holloway, died after setting fire to her cell, which was attributed to neglect, isolation and mental strain experienced by women in prison. Tchaikovsky subsequently described prison as a "brutalising, disabling and deforming experience".

=== Activism ===
In 1983, spurred by the death of another women in a fire at Holloway after it was alleged that officers had disabled her fire alarm to enable them to sleep, Tchaikovsky co-founded the charity Women in Prison alongside criminologist Pat Carlen. The charity aimed to support women presently or previously imprisoned, and has expanded to support women involved in the criminal justice system more generally.; Tchaikovsky served as WIP's director. WIP supported women leaving prison with access to employment and accommodation. Through WIP, Tchaikovsky established Education Training Connection, which offered education and training opportunities to women in prison. She also edited a quarterly magazine distributing within women's prisons that included creative pieces by prisoners. Tchaikovsky called for more targeted support for female offenders, including widespread access to rehabilitation programmes for substance users, and mental health support for women in mental health institutions; she was a key figure in the establishment of Women in Special Hospitals (WISH), addressing the mistreatment of women in prison with mental health conditions.

Tchaikovsky believed that punishing the "most hurt" in society in order to "teach them how to live" was "futile". She noted that many female offenders had experienced abuse, violence, sexual violence and poverty prior to entering the criminal justice system, and also believed that more attention should be given to the links between class, gender, race and imprisonment rates. Tchaikovsky believed it was important to consider issues experienced by women in children, including mothers separated from their children (who often ended up in state care) and issues of drug addiction. She felt that the penal system was "falling apart" and would continue to do so without adequate resources and funding from the government. Tchaikovsky was a driving force behind the establishment of the Holloway Remand Scheme, which replaced long custodial sentences with community-based reparation work alongside intensive support.

In 1985, Tchaikovsky contributed to the book Criminal Women, which became an important text in the field if criminology. In 1997, she was named a Cropwood fellow and spent a year at the University of Cambridge's Institute of Criminology, producing a study of 100 female prisoners, almost half of whom had gone through the Holloway Remand Scheme. The project was published in 2000 as One Hundred Women and notably highlighted the high number of imprisoned women who had experienced abuse as children. Tchaikovsky worked with Inquest to investigate the rise in deaths of women in prison.

Tchaikovsky wrote plays for Clean Break, which put on performances by women who had been through the criminal justice system; her play The Easter Egg was performed at the Edinburgh Fringe Festival in 1985. She served as a consultant for the ITV series Bad Girls, set in a women's prison.

Tchaikovsky died on 19 May 2002 at the age of 57 of respiratory problems. She was buried in Buckland Monachorum next to her father.

== Legacy ==
In June 2018, the British government launched its Female Offender Strategy, containing much of what Tchaikovsky campaigned on for decades, including replacing prison sentences with sentences in the community alongside intensive support to address issues such as addiction, trauma, debt and homelessness.

In 2020, Lockdown, a radio play about Tchaikovsky, made in collaboration with the Prison Radio Association utilising verbatim quotes from Tchaikovsky, premiered on BBC Radio 4.
