= Timberlake Wertenbaker =

British-based playwright, screenplay writer, and translator

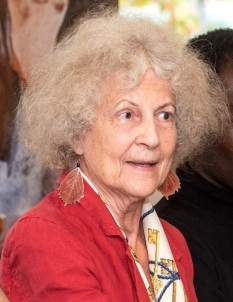
- Born: 1946 (age 79–80); New York City, New York, U.S.
- Occupations: Playwright, Librettist
- Writing career
- Genres: Modern theatre, original works and translations

Lael Louisiana Timberlake Wertenbaker (born 1946) is a British-based playwright, screenplay writer, and translator who has written plays for the Royal Court, the Royal Shakespeare Company and others. She has been described in The Washington Post as "the doyenne of political theatre of the 1980s and 1990s".

Wertenbaker's best-known work is Our Country's Good, which received six Tony nominations for its 1991 production. She has a propensity to write about political thinking and conflict, especially where there is a settled orthodoxy: "Then the rebel in me goes berserk, and I start pawing at it. I like the area where the questions are, and the ambiguities of political life, rather than the certainties."

== Biography ==
Wertenbaker was born in 1946 in New York City to Charles Wertenbaker, a journalist, and Lael Wertenbaker, a writer. Much of her childhood was spent in the Basque Country in the small French fishing village of Ciboure. She has been described as possessing a "characteristic reticence"; she has indicated that this may spring partly from her upbringing in Ciboure: "One thing they would tell you as a child was never to say anything because you might be betraying someone who had done something politically or whatever. So I was inculcated with this idea of emotional privacy."

Wertenbaker was the resident writer for Shared Experience in 1983 and the Royal Court Theatre from 1984 to 1985. She was on the Executive Council of the English Stage Company from 1992 to 1997 and on the Executive Committee of PEN from 1998 to 2001. She served as the Royden B. Davis professor of Theatre at Georgetown University, Washington D.C., for 2005–06. She was the Leverhulme Artist in Residence at the Freud Museum in 2011. She was also the artistic director of the New Perspective Theatre Company. Wertenbaker was the Chair in Playwriting at the University of East Anglia from 2003 to 2023. She has also been on the Royal Society of Literature Council and was an Artistic Advisor at RADA.

Central topics in her work are the efforts of individuals, particularly women: pursuing quests, seeking change, breaking boundaries, and constructing or challenging gender roles. A central technique is the revisioning of actual or imaginary lives from the past, sometimes remote in place as well as in time. There is a further recurring theme in her work: displacement. In her plays, characters are often removed from the familiarity of home and are forced to live in new cultures, sometimes defined by national boundaries, other times by cultural and class divisions. From this central theme emerge related themes, including isolation, dispossession, and the problem of forging an identity within a new cultural milieu. In her work, individuals often seem to assume roles, as if identity were a matter of persons performing themselves. Wertenbaker's work also demonstrates a keen awareness that communication occurs through language that often inadequately expresses experience.

In 1997, the British Library acquired Wertenbaker's archive consisting of manuscripts, correspondence and papers relating to her writings. Wertenbaker has a home in north London, where she lives with her husband, the writer John Man.

== Honours and awards ==
- 1985 Plays and Players Most Promising Playwright Award for The Grace of Mary Traverse
- 1988 Evening Standard Award for Most Promising Playwright, Our Country's Good
- 1988 Laurence Olivier/BBC Award for Best New Play, Our Country's Good
- 1989 Eileen Anderson Central Television Drama Award for The Love of the Nightingale
- 1989 Whiting Award for Drama
- 1990 Drama Critics' Circle Award for Best New Foreign Play (New York), Our Country's Good
- 1991 Critics' Circle Theatre Awards for Best West End Play (London), Three Birds Alighting on a Field
- 1992 Susan Smith Blackburn Prize for Three Birds Alighting on a Field
- 1992 Writers' Guild Award (Best West End Play) for Three Birds Alighting on a Field
- 2016 Writers' Guild Award (Best New Play) for "Jefferson's Garden"

Wertenbaker was elected a Fellow of the Royal Society of Literature in 1999.

== Works ==
=== Plays ===
Wertenbaker has written plays for the Royal Court, the RSC and other theatre companies:

- This Is No Place for Tallulah Bankhead (1978)
- The Third (1980)
- Second Sentence (1980)
- Case to Answer (1980)
- Breaking Through (1980)
- New Anatomies (1981)
- Inside Out (1982)
- Home Leave (1982)
- Abel’s Sister (1984)
- The Grace of Mary Traverse (1985)
- Our Country's Good (1988)
- The Love of the Nightingale (1989)
- Three Birds Alighting on a Field (1991)
- The Break of Day (1995)
- After Darwin (1998)
- Dianeira (radio, 1999)
- The Ash Girl (adaptation of "Cinderella", 2000)
- Credible Witness (2001)
- Galileo's Daughter (2004)
- Scenes of Seduction (radio, 2005)
- Divine Intervention (2006)
- Arden City (for the National Theatre Connections program, 2008)
- The Line (2009)
- Our Ajax (Southwark Playhouse, produced by Karl Sydow and Supporting Wall, 2013)
- The Ant and the Cicada (2014)
- Jefferson's Garden (2015)
- Winter Hill (Octagon Theatre Bolton, 2017)
- Who Are You? (2021)
- Pity the Monster (Jermyn Street Theatre as part of 15 Heroines) (2020)

=== Translations and adaptations ===
Her translations and adaptations include several plays by Marivaux (Shared Experience, Radio 3), Sophocles’ Theban Plays (RSC), Euripides’ Hecuba (ACT, San Francisco), Eduardo de Filippo, Gabriela Preissová’s Jenůfa (Arcola), and Racine (Phèdre, Britannicus).

- Mephisto by Ariane Mnouchkine (1986)
- Léocadia by Jean Anouilh (1987)
- False Admissions; Successful Strategies; La Dispute: Three Plays by Marivaux (1989)
- The Thebans by Sophocles (1992)
- Filumena by Eduardo De Filippo (1998)
- Hecuba by Euripides (2001) (radio)
- Jenůfa by Gabriela Preissová (2007)
- Hippolytus by Euripides (2009)
- Phèdre by Jean Racine (2009)
- Elektra by Sophocles (2010 & 2012)
- Antigone by Sophocles (2011)
- Britannicus by Jean Racine (2011)
- Little brother. An odyssey to Europe by Ibrahima Balde and Amets Arzallus Antia (Published by Scribe, 2019)
- Jules and Jim, adapted from Henri-Pierre Roché's novel (2023)
- The Mongol Khan (2023)
- Little Brother, Adapted from Minan by Amets Arzallus and Ibrahima Balde. Jermyn Street Theatre (2025)
