= Hibo Wardere =

Somali-born campaigner

Hibo Wardere is a Somali-born campaigner against female genital mutilation (FGM), author, and public speaker. Born in Somalia, she moved to London, England when just a teenager in 1989, as a refugee fleeing the Somali Civil War. She currently resides in Walthamstow, London, where she worked as a mediator and a regular FGM educator for Waltham Forest Borough. Her testimonials and campaigning work have made her one of Britain's most prominent campaigners about FGM and she has appeared in numerous publications, including the Telegraph, the BBC, and The Guardian.

== Early life ==
Hibo Wardere was born in Somalia. At the age of six, she was the victim of type 3 FGM, an event she has described as "being engulfed in pain from head to toe". Every day for the next ten years, she sought answers from her mother, but was always denied a response. When Wardere was 16, she finally struck a deal with a relative, who promised to tell her everything about what happened after her wedding night. She was horrified by the revelations, and soon fled to London after the civil war broke out in the 1980s.

== Activism ==
When she arrived in London, Wardere sought treatment for her wounds, but received little support from the NHS. Doctors failed to ask what had happened to her, and only rarely mentioned FGM on her medical files, even when she gave birth to her children.

Wardere eventually found the answers she was looking for at the library, where she read about female mutilation in a book. Years later, when she was studying to become a teaching assistant, she opened up about her story in a homework essay. The head of staff read her work and asked her to deliver a speech to 120 teachers, during which some realised that their students might have experienced the same trauma. After reading Wardere's essay, school governor Clare Coghill booked Wardere appointments with other schools in the area. Wardere has worked as a mediator and FGM educator since then, helping young students escape FGM. She also delivers awareness raising sessions to doctors and the Police to assist in their understanding of FGM.

Her testimonies have appeared in numerous publications, including the BBC, the Guardian and the Telegraph. Wardere has advised that as an FGM survivor, she is aware many other women who have undergone the practice feel too ashamed to speak out about their suffering. Wardere is quoted as saying “It is a sexual abuse. It brings shame and rips women and girls of their dignity. It should be stopped".

Wardere's main ambition for the future is to see Female Genital Mutilation eradicated in her lifetime.

Her memoir, Cut, was published in April 2016.

== Personal life ==
Hibo Wardere lives with her husband Yusuf and their seven children.
