= Theatre of Scotland =

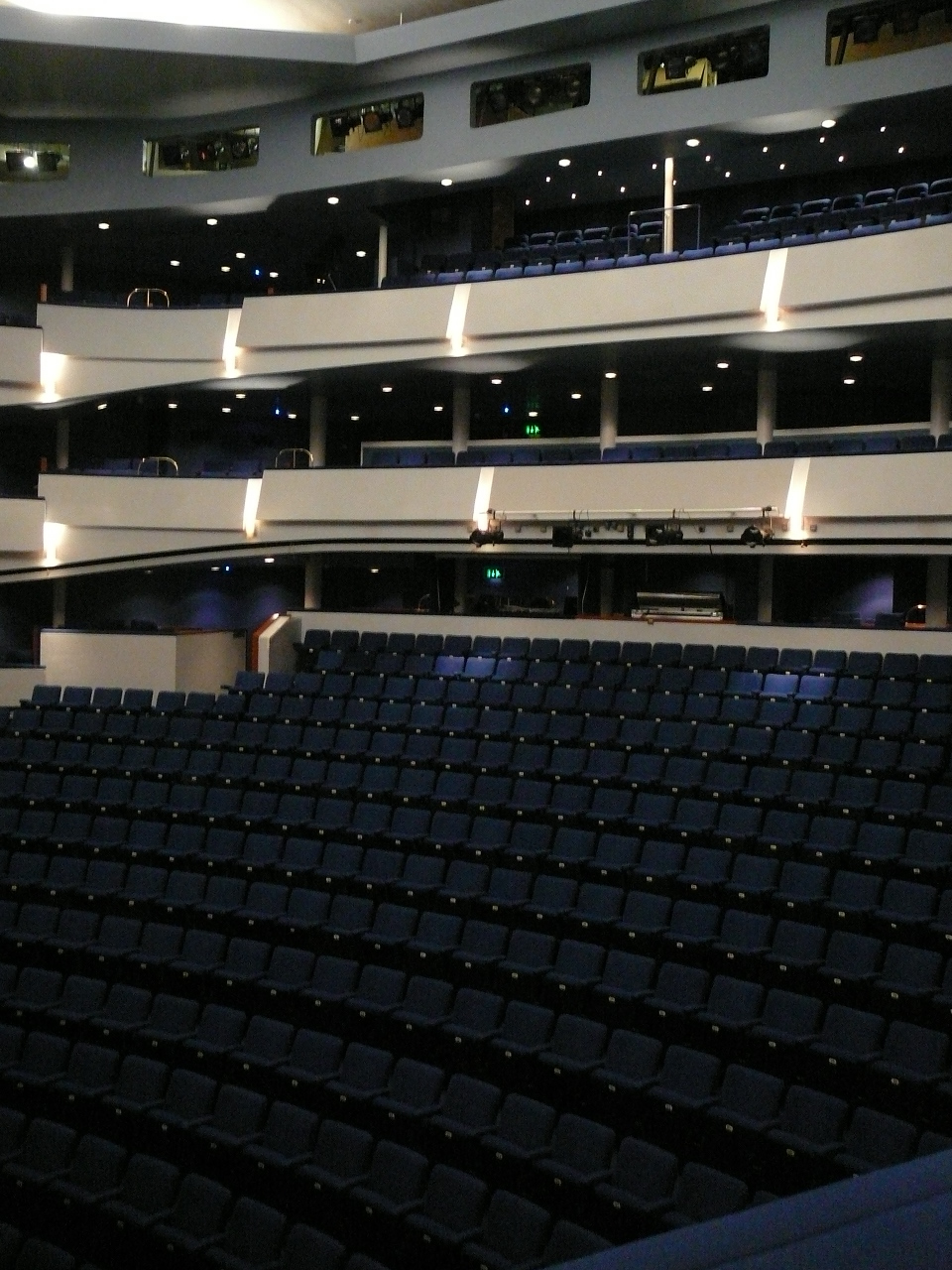
Eden Court Theatre, Inverness

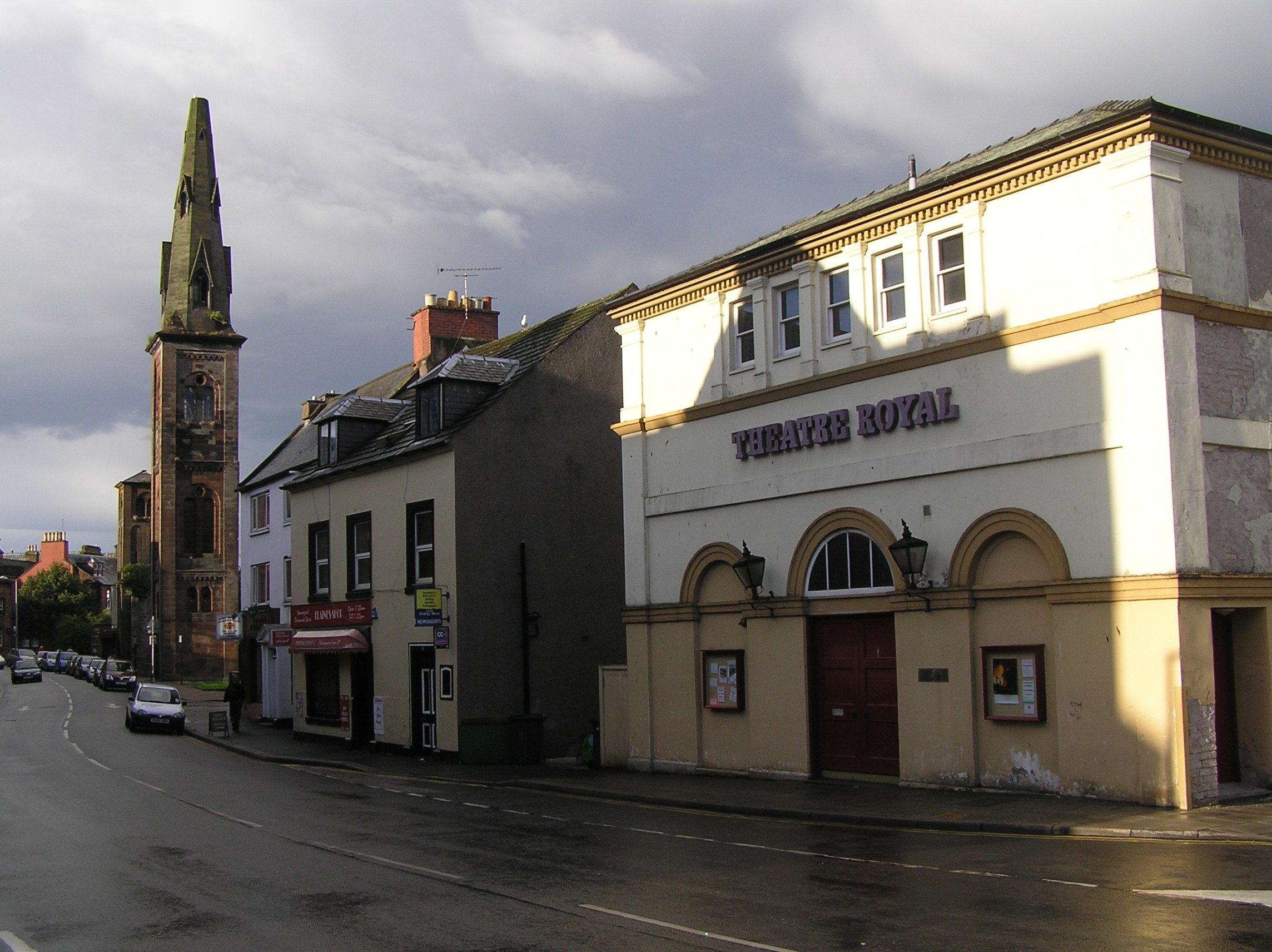
Theatre Royal in Dumfries, the oldest working theatre in Scotland

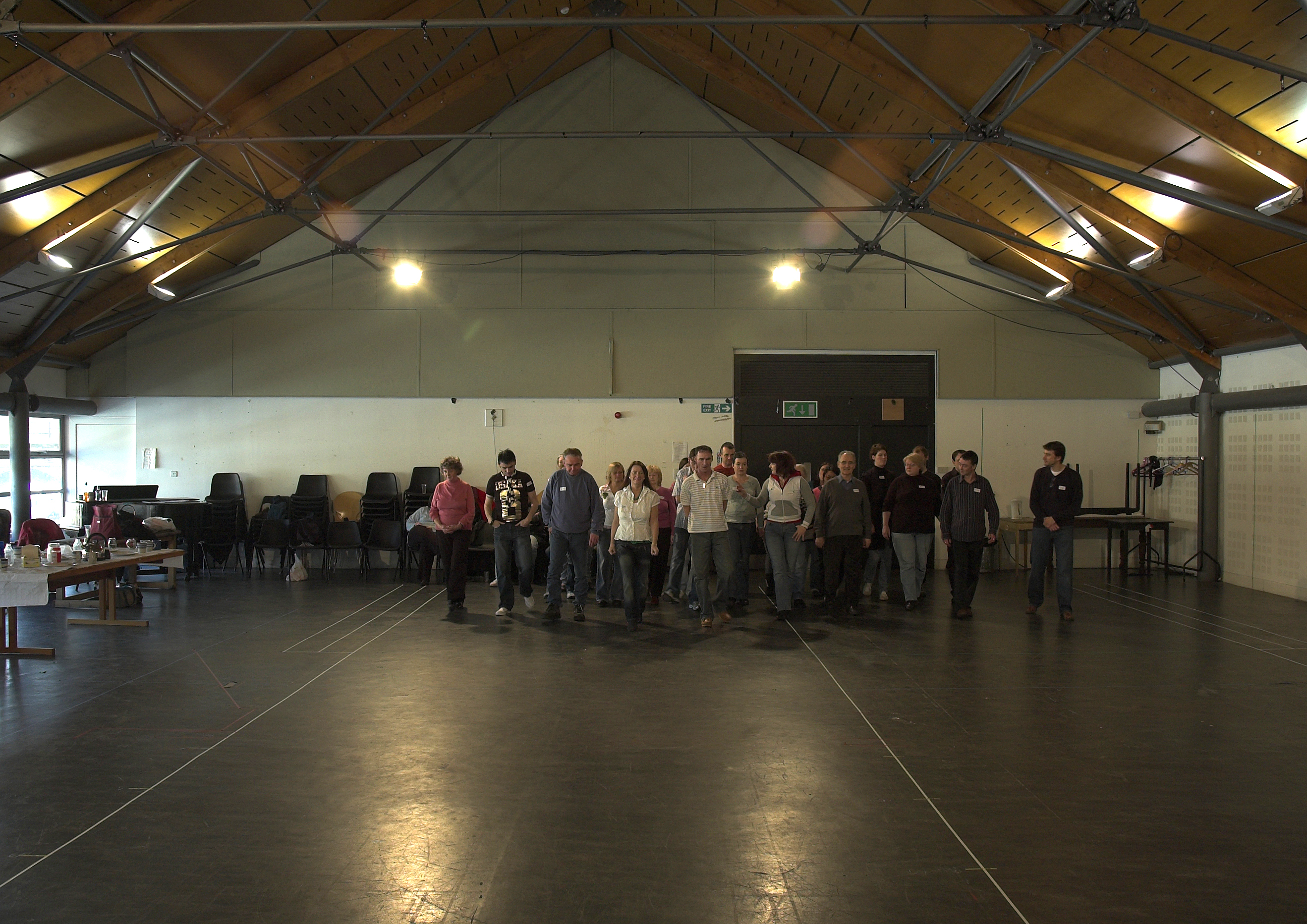
Rehearsal room at the Citizens in Glasgow

Theatre in Scotland refers to the history of the performing arts in Scotland, or those written, acted and produced by Scots. Scottish theatre generally falls into the Western theatre tradition, although many performances and plays have investigated other cultural areas. The main influences are from North America, England, Ireland and from Continental Europe. Scotland's theatrical arts were generally linked to the broader traditions of Scottish and English-language literature and to British and Irish theatre, American literature and theatrical artists. As a result of mass migration, both to and from Scotland, in the modern period, Scottish literature has been introduced to a global audience, and has also created an increasingly multicultural Scottish theatre.

Scottish theatre dates back at least as far as the Middle Ages. Because of the linguistic divide between Lowland Scots and Scottish Gaelic speakers and puritanism in the wake of the Scottish reformation, it has been a late development. A third problem was the union which removed patronage. Scottish "national drama" emerged in the early 1800s, as plays with specifically Scottish themes began to dominate the Scottish stage. The existing repertoire of Scottish-themed plays included John Home's Douglas (1756) and Allan Ramsay's The Gentle Shepherd (1725), with the last two being the most popular plays among amateur groups. Douglas elicited the (in)famous "Whaur's Yer Wullie Shakespeare Noo?" jeer from a member of one of its early audiences, and was also the subject of a number of pamphlets for and against it.

Notable theatrical institutions include the National Theatre of Scotland, the Citizens Theatre of Glasgow and the Royal Conservatoire of Scotland (formerly RSAMD), whose alumni include noted performers and directors Robert Carlyle, Tom Conti, Sheena Easton, John Hannah, Daniela Nardini, Hannah Gordon, Phyllis Logan and Ian McDiarmid.

== Drama ==
=== Folk plays ===
Medieval Scotland probably had its own Mystery plays, often performed by craft guilds, like one described as ludi de ly haliblude and staged at Aberdeen in 1440 and 1445 and which was probably connected with the feast of Corpus Christi, but no texts are extant. One tradition that has survived into the modern day is "guising", the ancestor of America's "trick or treat". This involved youngsters dressing up in costume at New Years and Halloween and often performing a song or act for a reward. Up-helly-aa, a Shetland festival appealing to Viking heritage, only took its modern form out of "mischief" of guising, tar-barrelling and other activities in the 1870s as part of a Romantic revival. Legislation was enacted against folk plays in 1555, and against liturgical plays ("clerk-plays or comedies based on the canonical scriptures") in 1575 by the General Assembly of the Church of Scotland. However, attempts to ban folk plays were more leniently applied and less successful than once assumed. They continued into the seventeenth century, with parishioners in Aberdeen reproved for parading and dancing in the street with bells at weddings and Yule in 1605, Robin Hood and May plays at Kelso in 1611 and Yuletide guising at Perth in 1634. The kirk also allowed some plays, particularly in schools when they served their own ends, as in the comedy about the prodigal son permitted at St. Andrews in 1574.

=== Renaissance drama ===
James Wedderburn is recorded as having written anti-Catholic tragedies and comedies in Scots around 1540, before he was forced to flee into exile. These included the Beheading of Johne the Baptist and the Historie of Dyonisius the Tyraonne, which were performed at Dundee. David Lyndsay (c. 1486-1555), diplomat and the head of the Lyon Court, was a prolific poet and dramatist. He produced an interlude at Linlithgow Palace for the king and queen thought to be a version of his play The Thrie Estaitis in 1540, which satirised the corruption of church and state, and which is the only complete play to survive from before the Reformation. Productions of Ane Satyre of the Thrie Estatis were mounted in Cupar on 7 June 1552 and at Greenside in Edinburgh in August 1544. The Pomp of the Gods was performed before the Queen Regent, Mary of Guise, in 1557. In February 1562, masques were performed at Holyrood to celebrate the marriage of Lord James Stewart, later the Earl of Moray, to Agnes Keith, the Earl Marischal's eldest daughter.

George Buchanan (1506–82) was major influence on Continental theatre with plays such as Jepheths and Baptistes, which influenced Pierre Corneille and Jean Racine and through them the neo-classical tradition in French drama, but his impact in Scotland was limited by his choice of Latin as a medium. A masque by Buchanan and a spectacular fire drama devised and directed by Bastian Pagez were among the entertainments staged to celebrate the baptism of Prince James at Stirling Castle in December 1566. Another elaborate masque was performed at Stirling Castle in August 1594 to celebrate the baptism of Prince Henry. The anonymous The Maner of the Cyring of ane Play (before 1568) and Philotus (published in London in 1603), are isolated examples of surviving plays. The latter is a vernacular Scots comedy of errors, probably designed for court performance for Mary, Queen of Scots or James VI. The plot involves a lecherous octogenarian's pursuit of a teenage girl, and Jamie Reid-Baxter has suggested that it may be a satire on the marriage of Mary's Secretary of State, William Maitland of Lethington, to her much younger lady-in-waiting, Mary Fleming, in January 1567.

Costume for court masques, performed at the weddings of prominent courtiers including James Stewart, 1st Lord Doune, was managed by the wardrobe servant Servais de Condé. Courtiers dressed as shepherds for a masque at Castle Campbell in 1562. James VI and his wife Anne of Denmark personally dressed in costume and took part in masques. These performances typically involved music, dance, and disguise.

In July 1598, scholars from Edinburgh High School put on a play. Costumes were made for the characters of a Pope, two Cardinals, and several friars. A scaffold or stage was made at the school and erected at the High Tolbooth. After the performance the costumes were donated to the poor. The English system of professional companies of players and theatres that developed in this period was absent in Scotland, but in 1599 James VI gave a strong signal of his support for drama, overruling the opposition of the Reformed Kirk in insisting that a playhouse be provided off the High Street in Edinburgh for a company of English players led by Lawrence Fletcher and Martin Slater.

The loss of a royal court when James VI inherited the crown of England in 1603 meant there was no force to counter the Kirk's dislike of theatre, which struggled to survive in Scotland. However, it was not entirely extinguished. Surviving plays for the period include William Alexander's Monarchicke Tragedies, written just before his departure with the king for England in 1603. They were closet dramas in the advice for princes tradition, designed to be read rather than performed, and already indicate Alexander's preference for southern English over the Scots language.

=== Restoration drama ===
There is almost no evidence of theatre in the period from 1603 and 1660, and all theatres were closed under Oliver Cromwell's Commonwealth. After the Restoration there were some attempts to revive Scottish drama. In 1663 Edinburgh lawyer William Clerke wrote Marciano or the Discovery, a play about the restoration of a legitimate dynasty in Florence after many years of civil war. It was performed at the Tennis-Court Theatre at Holyrood Palace before the parliamentary high commissioner John Leslie, Earl of Rothes. Thomas Sydsurf's Tarugo's Wiles or the Coffee House, was first performed in London in 1667 and then in Edinburgh the year after and drew on Spanish comedy. Sydsurf was also manager from 1667 of the Tennis Court Theatre and ran a company of players in Edinburgh's Cannongate. The repertoire followed that in London and there were no new Scottish plays after Tarugo's Wiles. The Duke of Albany brought with him a company of actors when he was resident at Holyrood as commissioner. He was also joined by a group of Irish players, who brought their own costumes. He encouraged court masques and seasons of plays at the Tennis Court Theatre, one of which included Princess Anne, the future Queen Anne. A relative of Sydsurf, physician Archibald Pitcairne (1652–1713) wrote The Assembly or Scotch Reformation (1692), a ribald satire on the morals of the Presbyterian kirk, circulating in manuscript, but not published until 1722, helping to secure the association between Jacobitism and professional drama that discouraged the creation of professional theatre.

=== 18th century ===
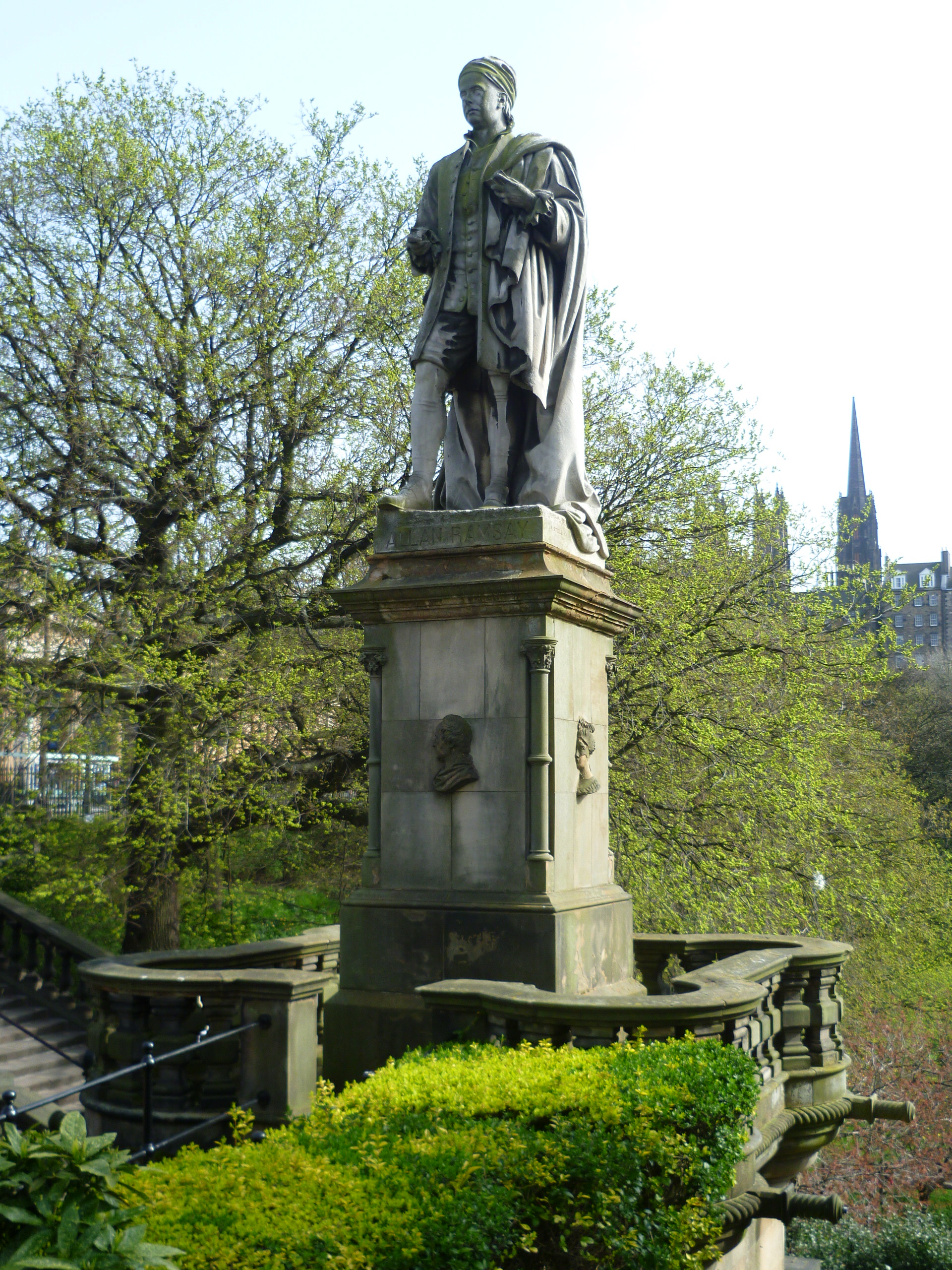
Allan Ramsay, one of the early defenders and writers of Scottish theatre

Major figures: Allan Ramsay, Joanna Baillie, John Home, Catherine Trotter, Newburgh Hamilton, James Thompson, David Mallet
Major plays: Eurydice, Fatal Friendship, Love at a Loss, Courtship A-la-Mode, Love at First Sight, The Petticoat-Ploter, The Doating Lovers, Sophonisba, Agamemnon, Tancrid and Sigismuda, Masque of Alfred

Drama was pursued by Scottish playwrights in London such as Catherine Trotter (1679-1749), born in London to Scottish parents and later moving to Aberdeen. Her plays included the verse-tragedy Fatal Friendship (1698), the comedy Love at a Loss (1700) and the history The Revolution in Sweden (1706). David Crawford's (1665-1726) plays included the Restoration comedies Courtship A-la-Mode (1700) and Love at First Sight (1704). These developed the character of the stage Scot, often a clown, but cunning and loyal. Newburgh Hamilton (1691–1761), born in Ireland of Scottish descent, produced the comedies The Petticoat-Ploter (1712) and The Doating Lovers or The Libertine (1715). He later wrote the libretto for Handel’s Samson (1743), closely based on John Milton's Samson Agonistes. James Thompson's plays often dealt with the contest between public duty and private feelings, and included Sophonisba (1730), Agamemnon (1738) and Tancrid and Sigismuda (1745), the last of which was an international success. David Mallet's (c. 1705–65) Eurydice (1731) was accused of being a coded Jacobite play and his later work indicates opposition to the Walpole administration. The opera Masque of Alfred (1740) was a collaboration between Thompson, Mallet and composer Thomas Arne, with Thompson supplying the lyrics for his most famous work, the patriotic song Rule, Britannia!.

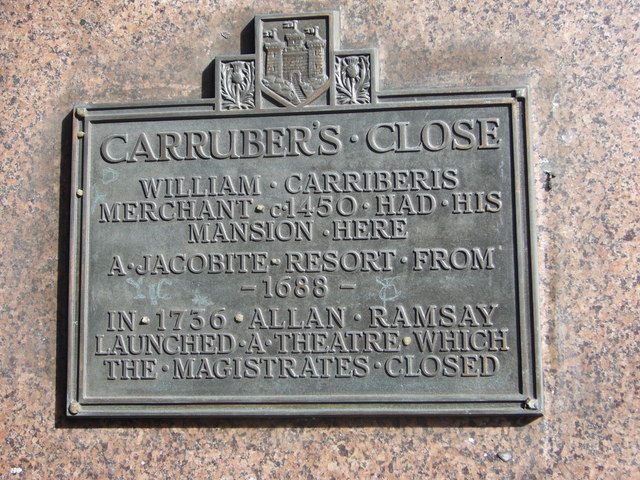
Carruber's Close, site of an early, but short-lived attempt by the poet, Allan Ramsay, to reintroduce theatre to Scotland in 1737

In Scotland, performances were largely limited to performances by visiting actors, who faced hostility from the Kirk. In November 1727, Edinburgh Town Council denounced stage plays. The Court of Session reversed the magistrates' pleas, but Rev Robert Wodrow complained of plays as "seminaries of idleness, looseness and sin." A pamphlet of the time described actors as, "the most profligate wretches and vilest vermin that hell ever vomited out... the filth and garbage of the earth, the scum and stain of human nature, the excrement and refuse of all mankind." In 1729, the Scots Company of Comedians, formed for dramatic entertainments, was forced to close. The Edinburgh Company of Players were able to perform in Dundee, Montrose, Aberdeen and regular performances at the Taylor's Hall in Edinburgh under the protection of a Royal Patent. In 1727, Allan Ramsay wrote his Some Hints in Defence of Dramatic Entertainment. Ramsay was instrumental in establishing them in a small theatre in Carruber's Close in Edinburgh, but the passing of the 1737 Licensing Act made their activities illegal and the theatre soon closed. In 1739, the Presbytery of Edinburgh closed a production of Macbeth. In 1747, Ramsay and his supporters opened a new theatre in what is now Old Playhouse Close in the burgh of the Canongate, beyond the influence of Edinburgh's Presbytery. In 1752, Glasgow's first theatre was burnt down, shortly after George Whitfield complained it was the "Devil's Home". Dundee and Perth seemed more tolerant. Dundee formed a Company of Players in 1734, but in 1784, the Dundee Town Council prevented a company from Edinburgh from entering. Perth did not seem to suffer these censorships, but it was 1780 before theatre was properly produced there. Aberdeen's theatres were closed in 1745 and 1751 by clergy as well. A new theatre was opened on Edinburgh's Canongate in 1747 and operated without a licence into the 1760s.

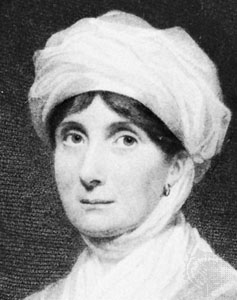
Engraving of playwright Joanna Baillie

In the later eighteenth century, many plays were written for and performed by small amateur companies and were not published, meaning most have been lost. Towards the end of the century there were "closet dramas", primarily designed to be read, rather than performed, including work by James Hogg (1770–1835), John Galt (1779–1839) and Joanna Baillie (1762–1851), often influenced by the ballad tradition and Gothic Romanticism. The blank verse tragedy Douglas, by John Home, was first performed in 1756 in Edinburgh. The play was a remarkable success in both Scotland and England for decades, attracting many notable actors of the period, such as Edmund Kean, who made his debut in it. Peg Woffington played Lady Randolph, a part which found a later exponent in Sarah Siddons. The opening lines of the second act are probably the best known "My name is Norval; on the Grampian Hills..." It also arguably led to James MacPherson's Ossian cycle. Home was hounded by the church authorities for Douglas. It may have been this persecution which drove Home to write for the London stage, in addition to Douglas' success there, and stopped him from founding the new Scottish national theatre that some had hoped he would. In 1783, John Logan's tragedy, Runnamede, was acted in the Edinburgh Theatre. It reflected contemporary politics in its emphasis on the liberties of the subject. It made out a clear parallel between John of England and George III of Great Britain, and for that reason the censorship of the Lord Chamberlain had prevented its production on the London stage. Walter Scott later wrote that the idea of the contrast drawn in Ivanhoe between Saxons and Normans was drawn from the staging of Runnamede with (anachronistic) Saxon and Norman barons on opposite sides of the theatre.

Also important was the work of Joanna Baillie (1762–1851); although her work was more significant anonymously in print than in performance for much of her lifetime, she emerged as one of Scotland's leading playwrights. Baillie's first volume of Plays on the Passions was published in 1798, consisting of Count Basil, a tragedy on love, The Tryal, a comedy on love, and De Monfort, a tragedy on hatred. De Monfort was successfully performed in Drury Lane, London before knowledge of her identity emerged and the prejudice against women playwrights began to affect her career.

=== 19th century ===
Major figures

- Joanna Baillie
- David Erskine
- Walter Scott

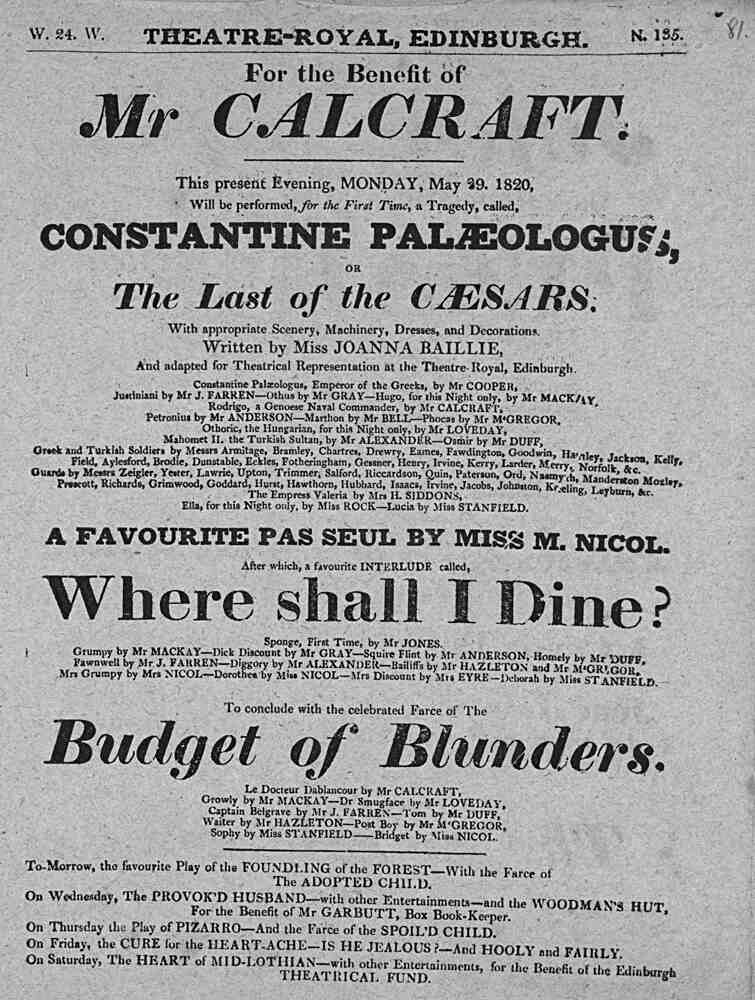
Playbill for Joanna Baillie's The Last of the Caesars; or, Constantine Palaeologus at the Theatre Royal Edinburgh, 29 May 1820

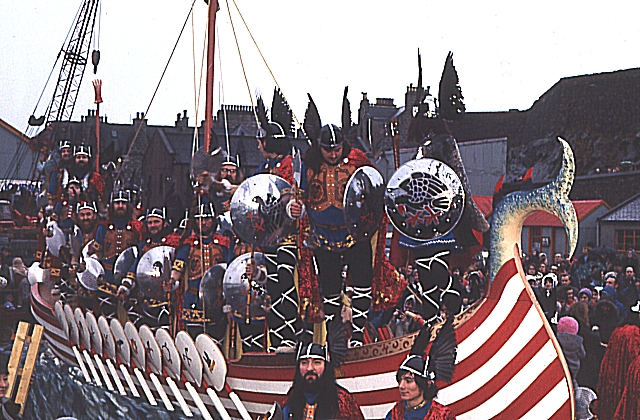
The reinvention of Up Helly Aa in the 1870s created a popular piece of folk theatre. This picture is from 1973.

In the later nineteenth century, Scottish music hall was at its height, but in the earlier part of the century, there were many adaptations of historical material, particularly the novels of Walter Scott. Scott was keenly interested in drama, becoming a shareholder in the Theatre Royal, Edinburgh. Baillie's Highland themed The Family Legend was first produced in Edinburgh in 1810 with the help of Scott, as part of a deliberate attempt to stimulate a national Scottish drama. Scott also wrote five plays, of which Hallidon Hill (1822) and MacDuff's Cross (1822), were patriotic Scottish histories. Adaptations of the Waverley novels, largely first performed in minor theatres rather than the larger Patent theatres, included The Lady in the Lake (1817), The Heart of Midlothian (1819/1820), and Rob Roy, which underwent over 1,000 performances in Scotland in this period. Also adapted for the stage were Guy Mannering (1817), The Bride of Lammermoor, The Antiquary (1820), Waverley (1823) and The Abbot. These highly popular plays saw the social range and size of the audience for theatre expand and helped shape theatre going practices in Scotland for the rest of the century.

Locally produced drama in this period included John O' Arnha, adapted from the poem by George Beattie by actor-manager Charles Bass and poet James Bowick for the Theatre Royal in Montrose in 1826. A local success, Bass also took the play to Dundee and Edinburgh.

Despite these successes, provincialism began to set in to Scottish theatre. By the 1840s, Scottish theatres were more inclined to use placards with slogans like "the best company out of London", rather than producing their own material. In 1893 in Glasgow, there were five productions of Hamlet in the same season. In the second half of the century the development of Scottish theatre was hindered by the growth of rail travel, which meant English tour companies could arrive and leave more easily for short runs of performances. A number of figures who could have made a major contribution to Scottish drama moved south to London, including William Sharp (1855–1905), William Archer (1856–1924) and J. M. Barrie (1860-1937).

In 1876, an obscure tar barrelling ceremony in Shetland called Up Helly Aa was modified into a pseudo-Norse performance. It has to be admitted even today that the costumes owe more to Wagner than to Vikings. Nonetheless, it is perhaps significant in being one of the best known pieces of folk ritual performance in Scotland today.

=== 20th century ===
J.M. Barrie was amongst the most successful of Scottish literary exports, spending most of his career in England. His Peter Pan (1904), which began life as a play, is one of the best known stories in English. Barrie is often linked to the Kailyard movement and his early plays such as Quality Street (1901) and The Admirable Crichton (1902) deal with temporary inversions of the normal social order. His later works, such as Dear Brutus (1917) and Mary Rose (1920), focused on historical themes. After Barrie the most successful Scottish playwrights of the early twentieth century were John Brandane and James Bridie, the pseudonyms, respectively, of doctors John Macintyre (1869-1947) and Osborne Mavor (1888–1951). Brandane's plays were often humorous explorations of the clash between modernity and tradition in Highland society, as in The Glen is Mine (1925). Bridie emerged as a prolific playwright and a major figure in developing modern Scottish drama. As well as drawing on his medical experience, as in The Anatomist (1930), his plays included middle class satires such as The Sunlight Sonata (1928) and often called on biblical characters such as devils and angels, as in Mr. Bolfry (1943). He was a member of the Scottish National Players (1924–43), who performed several of his plays and which aimed to produce a Scottish national theatre, but his view that they should become a professional company meant he resigned from the board. He was a founder and first president of the Glasgow Citizens' Theatre (1943), a member of the body that became the Scottish Arts Council and was its first President (1947). He founded the College of Drama within the Royal Scottish Academy of Music, Glasgow (1951).

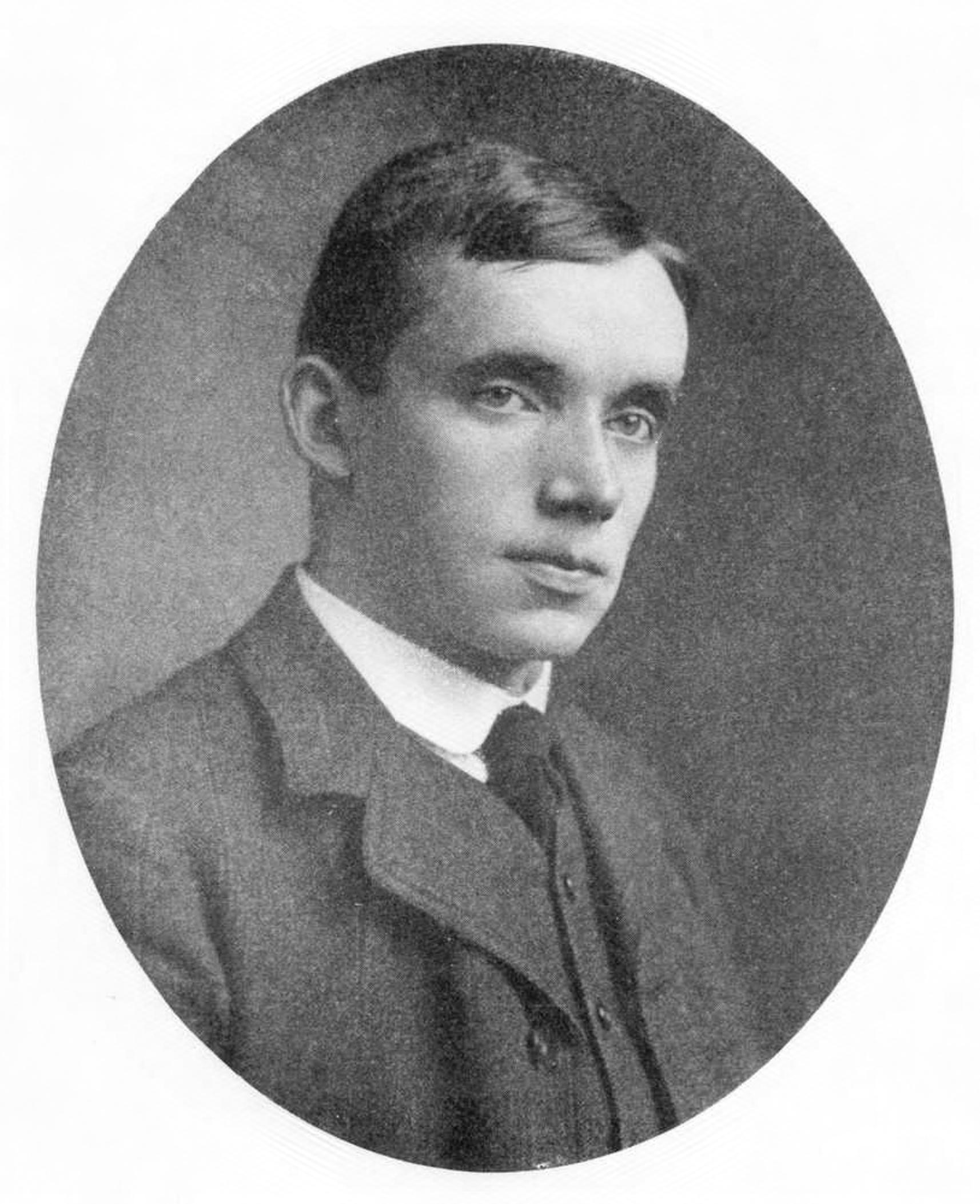
James Bridie, one of the leading figures in Scottish theatre in the early twentieth century

The early twentieth century saw the emergence of a tradition of popular or working class theatre. Hundreds of amateur groups were established, particularly in the growing urban centres of the Lowlands. Many were offshoots of the Workers' Theatre Movement (WTM) and the Unity Theatre Society (UTS). Among the most important were the Fife Miner Players (1926–31), Glasgow Workers' Theatre Group (1937–41) and Glasgow Unity Theatre (1941–51), which lay the ground for modern popular theatre groups. Important playwrights in the movement included former miner Joe Corrie (1894–1968), whose plays included In Time o' Strife (1927), based on the events of the general strike the year before. The Scottish Repertory Theatre was the first Scottish company to encourage native playwrights. In the interwar period its aim was taken up by other amateur companies, particularly the Curtain Theatre, Glasgow, who "discovered" the work of Robert McLellan (1907–85), including his first full-length play Toom Byres (1936) and his best known work Jamie the Saxt (1936). He was a talented comic dramatist, committed to writing in Scots.

The shift to drama that focused on working class life in the post-war period gained momentum with Robert McLeish's The Gorbals Story (1946), which dealt with the immense social problems of urban Scotland. Similarly, Ena Lamont Stewart's Men Should Weep (1947) focused on the impact of the depression in Scotland. Other major Scottish playwrights of the era included Robert Kemp (1908–67), who produced work including The Heart is Highland (1959), and George Munro (1902-68) whose plays included Vineyard Street (1949).

The Edinburgh Festival was founded in 1947 as a substitute for festivals at Glyndebourne, Munich and Salzburg, which could not be held in the aftermath of World War II. The Edinburgh Festival Fringe began when eight theatre companies, who had not been included in the programme, organised their own performances in small and converted theatres. Until the 1960s relations with between the two co-existing festivals were strained. Together they are now the largest, and among the most prestigious, arts festivals in the world, and have included large and small-scale theatrical productions.

A Scottish theatrical renaissance has been perceived by Ian Brown as occurring between the opening of the Traverse Theatre in Edinburgh in 1963 and the foundation of the Scottish Society of Playwrights in 1973. The Theatres Act 1968 abolished the system of censorship of the stage by the Lord Chamberlain that had existed in Great Britain since 1737. This allowed much greater artistic freedom, but local authorities in Scotland still retained the ability to prosecute "obscene performances" under local by-laws and statutes.

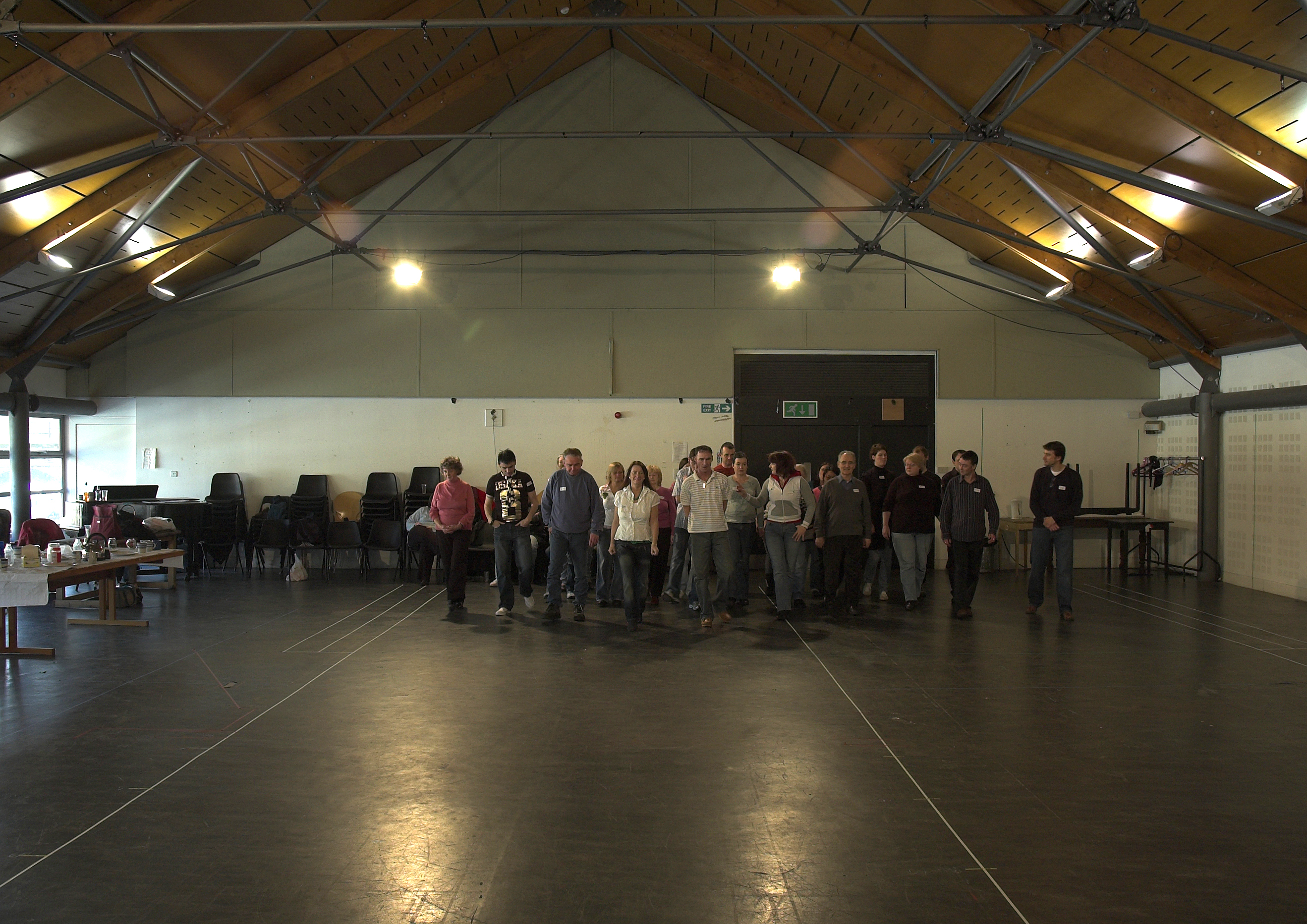
Rehearsal room at the Citizens Theatre in Glasgow

In the 1970s a large number of plays explored the nature of Scottish identity. Historical dramas included Stewart Conn's (b. 1936) The Burning (1971) and Hector MacMillan's (b. 1929) The Rising (1973). MacMillan's The Sash (1973) was one of the earliest plays to confront sectarianism. Workplace dramas included Bill Bryden's (b. 1942) Willie Rough (1975) and Roddy McMillan's The Bevellers (1973). These plays opened the way for a new form of independent and politically committed community theatre. The trend was kicked off by 7:84 (1971–2008), with their 1973 production of John McGrath's (1935–2002) The Cheviot, the Stag, and the Black Black Oil. McGrath's work, such as The Game's a Bogey (1974), was socialist in intent and took the part of resurgent Scottish nationalism. Independent theatre companies that formed along the lines of this model have been many and include such names as TAG (1967–), Borderline Theatre Company (1974–), Wildcat Stage Productions (1978–), or Theatre Alba (1981–2021).

The Scots language continued to be used as a medium for Scottish drama, particularly comedy. In 1947, Robert Kemp adapted Molière's L'Ecole des Femmes for the Scottish stage as Let Wives Tak Tent. Alexander Reid's The Lass wi' the Muckle Mou (1950) and The Warld's Wonder (1953) were both well received. Sydney Goodsir Smith's The Wallace was staged at the Kirk's Assembly Hall as part of the 1960 International Festival. The director of productions at the Gateway Theatre, Victor Carin translated four plays into Scots: The Hypochondriack (a translation of Molière's The Imaginary Invalid) (1963); The Servant o' Twa Maisters (translated from Carlo Goldoni's The Servant of Two Masters) (1965); The Chippit Chantie (a translation of Heinrich von Kleist's The Broken Jug (1968); and A Muckle Steer (a translation of Ludvig Holberg's The Fidget) (1976). Several of these comedies became popular staples for amateur companies. In the 1970s, the dramatic potential of the language was demonstrated in plays such as The Bevellers, The Jesuit, Willie Rough, The Hardman and The Slab Boys. In 1980, Martin Bowman and Bill Findlay translated Michel Tremblay's Les Belles Soeurs into contemporary Scots as The Guid Sisters. In 1985, David Purves's The Puddok an the Princess, a Scots language version of The Frog Prince, won an Edinburgh Fringe First Award for Charles Nowosielski's Theatre Alba. David Purves and Robin Lorimer published translations of Shakespeare's Macbeth into Scots in 1992 and 1993 respectively.

The 1960s and 1970s also saw the flourishing of Scottish Gaelic drama. Key figures included Iain Crichton Smith, whose plays explored wide-ranging themes. Often humorous, they also dealt with serious topics such as the betrayal of Christ in An Coileach (A Cockerel, 1966) of the Highland Clearances in A' Chùirt (The Court, 1966). Iain Moireach's plays also used humour to deal with serious subjects, as in Feumaidh Sinn a Bhith Gàireachdainn (We Have to Laugh, 1969), which focused on threats to the Gaelic language. Other major figures included Tormod Calum Dòmhnallach (1927–2000), whose work included Anna Chaimbeul (Anna Campbell, 1977), which was influenced by Japanese Noh theatre. Fionnlagh MacLeòid's (Finley Macleod) work included Ceann Cropic (1967), which was strongly influenced by the theatre of the absurd. Similarly, Donaidh MacIlleathain (Donnie Maclean), made use of absurd dialogue in An Sgoil Dhubh (A Dark School, 1974). Many of these authors continued writing into the 1980s and even the 1990s, but this was something of a golden age for Gaelic drama that has not been matched.

The political and funding climate changed radically after the failure of the devolution referendum of 1979 and the election of a Conservative government under Margaret Thatcher. The Scottish Arts Council encouraged theatre companies to function as business, finding funding in ticket sales and commercial sponsorship. In 1981 the actor Ewan Hooper was given £50,000 to found the Scottish Theatre Company based in Glasgow and designed to promote the work of Scottish writers. The company found touring difficult as there were insufficient large venues that could generate the necessary income outside of the major cities. Works in the first season included McGrath's Animal (1979) and Bryden's Civilians (1981). Artistic successes were accompanied by financial disaster and the company was £120,000 in debt by the end of its second season. Despite some critical triumphs, the company was wound down in 1987. 7:84 also encountered a period of financial instability, but new structures, new management and an emphasis on encouraging new writing led to works such as Rona Munro's (b. 1959) Bold Girls (1990). By the last two decades of the twentieth century a substantial body of Scottish theatrical writing had built up. There was also a change from a habit of one writer working with one company to several companies drawing on a community of writers. Scottish play writing became increasingly internationalised, with Scottish writers adapting classic texts, such as Liz Lochhead's version of Molière's Tartuffe (1985) and The Misanthrope (1973/2005) or Edwin Morgan's translation of Cyrano de Bergerac (1992). Scottish playwrights were also increasingly preoccupied with wider European culture, as can be seen in Jo Clifford's (b. 1955) Loosing Venice (1985) and David Greig's (b. 1969) Europe (1995).

=== 21st century ===
The current century has been described as a "golden age" for theatre in Scotland. Devolution and the re-establishment of the Scottish Parliament at Holyrood in 1999 had significant impacts on the ecology and infrastructure of the performing arts.

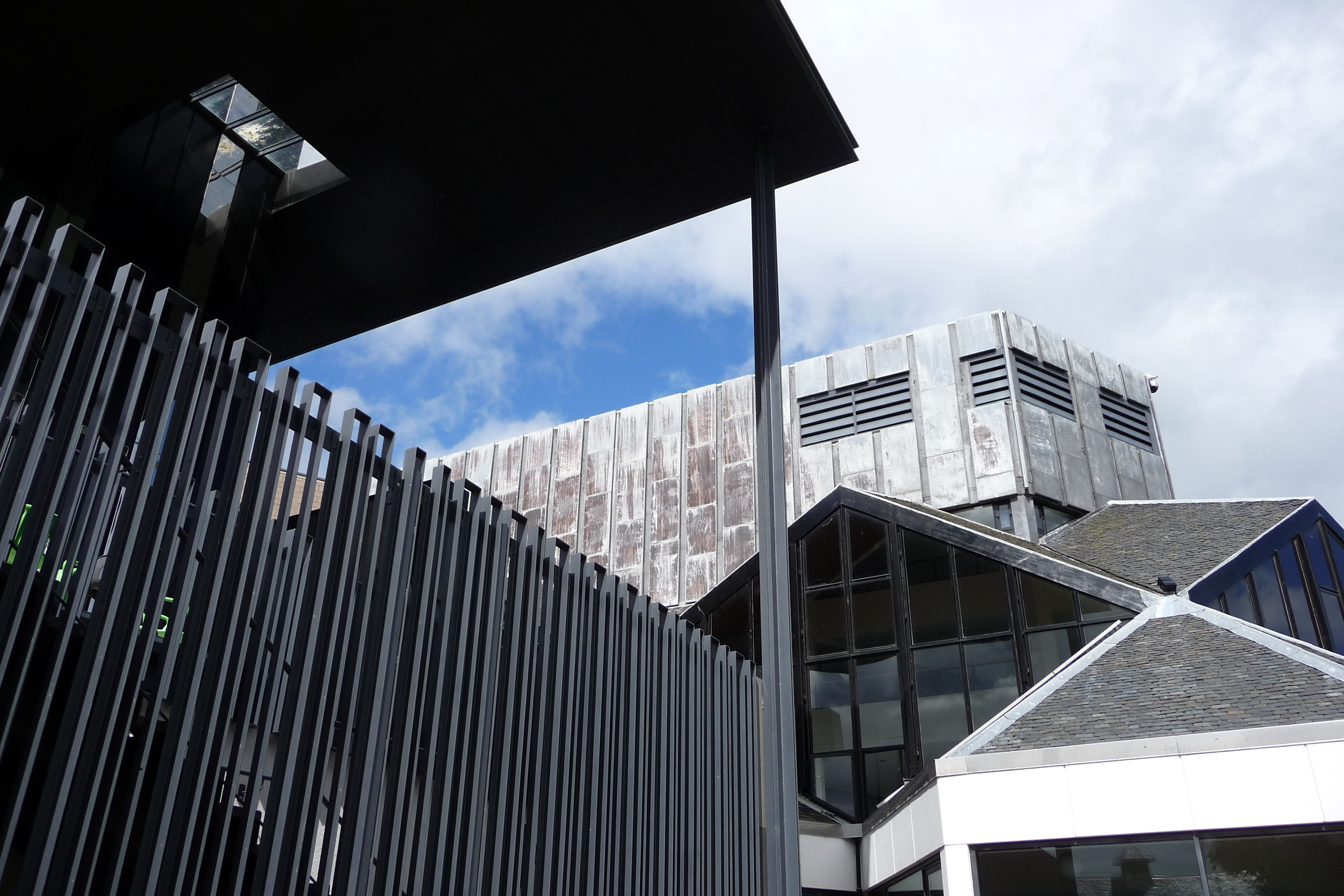
Eden Court Theatre, Inverness

Numerous venues were expanded and refurbished, while new venues opened in several towns and cities across Scotland. The Byre Theatre in St Andrews was renovated and expanded at a cost of £5.5m, opening in 2001. North Edinburgh Arts Centre opened in 2002 in the Muirhouse area of Edinburgh, comprising a 96-150-seat studio theatre, two smaller studio spaces, a recording studio, gallery, licensed cafe and garden. Eden Court Theatre in Inverness re-opened in November 2007, having undergone a complete refurbishment and extension by Robertson Construction and Page\Park Architects. Upon its re-opening, it became the largest combined arts centre in Scotland. Mull Theatre moved into new premises at Druimfin in 2008, and in 2013 partnered with arts centre An Tobar to form Comar, a multi-arts organisation that produces, presents and develops creative work. Perth Theatre closed for renovation in 2014, with projected re-opening in 2017. In contrast to these developments, some venues closed their doors permanently, including The Arches in Glasgow. The Arches was a major site for contemporary theatre and avant-garde performance. Under the direction of Jackie Wylie, The Arches staged performances such as DEREVO's Natura Morte, Nic Green's Trilogy and Linder Sterling's Darktown Cakewalk. Major contemporary theatre festivals produced by The Arches included Behaviour, Wylie's rebranding of the original Arches Theatre Festival, and Arches Live, a theatre festival celebrating young risk-taking artists. The venue closed in 2015.

Funding for the arts also underwent major changes with the replacement of the Scottish Arts Council by Creative Scotland. The Scottish Government brought Creative Scotland into being on 1 July 2010, after an interim company, Creative Scotland 2009, was set up to assist the transition from the existing organisations, Scottish Screen and the Scottish Arts Council.

Since the early days of devolution, a national theatre for Scotland (distinct from the National Theatre in London) had been a priority of the Scottish Executive. A 2003 debate in the Scottish Parliament led to the constitution of the National Theatre of Scotland. Vicky Featherstone was appointed Artistic Director in 2004 and the company was formally established in 2006. The company has no theatre building of its own, although administration is based at Speirs Lock in Glasgow. Instead it tours work to theatres, village halls, schools and site-specific locations across Scotland, the UK and internationally. The company has created over 200 productions and collaborates with other theatre companies, local authorities, and individual artists to create a variety of performances, from large-scale productions through to theatre specifically made for the smallest venues.

Playwrights and theatre companies responded to the burst of creative energy stemming from devolution, and later, the 2014 Scottish independence referendum, in a number of ways. Some chose to look back into Scottish history, focusing in particular on periods which seemed to have been forgotten, such as the ill-fated Darien scheme which led to the Acts of Union. It has been claimed that the 2010 Darien-themed play Caledonia by Alistair Beaton "signifies a partial refocusing on the past in Scottish theatre", a prediction borne out by the rise in Scottish history plays in subsequent years, including Dunsinane by David Greig (2010), The James Plays by Rona Munro (2014), Tim Barrow's Union (2014), and Glory on Earth by Linda McLean (2017).

Other writers scrutinised contemporary life in Scotland, examining themes of identity and nationhood. Gagarin Way by Gregory Burke premiered at the Traverse Theatre, in July 2001, before transferring to the National Theatre and the West End in London. The Wonderful World of Dissocia was written and directed by Anthony Neilson about a young woman suffering from dissociative disorder. The idea was originally workshopped with a group of students at LAMDA in 2002 but was later re-written and produced for Glasgow's Tron Theatre at the Edinburgh International Festival in 2004. Black Watch, written by Gregory Burke and directed by John Tiffany, was part of the first season of the National Theatre of Scotland. Based on interviews with former soldiers, it portrays soldiers in the Black Watch regiment of the British Army serving on Operation TELIC in Iraq during 2004, prior to the amalgamation into the Royal Regiment of Scotland. Black Watch was first performed during the Edinburgh Festival Fringe on 1 August 2006 in a temporary traverse stage at the former University of Edinburgh Officer Training Corps' Drill hall. Rantin' by Kieran Hurley provides an optimistic portrait of modern Scotland, similar to the work of David Greig and Stephen Greenhorn: "They propose a nation that is never static, always in process, proud of its heritage as well as its increasing heterogeneity and, above all, one that can surprise and provoke engagement beyond the confines of a restrictive and potentially damaging nationalism." Hurley and his collaborators, all prominent in the Yes campaign, presented a rousing patchwork of song and monologue which nodded to John McGrath while extending his socialist legacy into a new century. Other significant works of the early 21st century include Zinnie Harris’ Further than the Furthest Thing (2000), Decky Does A Bronco by Douglas Maxwell (2000), David Harrower’s Blackbird (2005), Sunshine on Leith by Stephen Greenhorn (2007), and historical trilogy The James Plays by Rona Munro (2014).

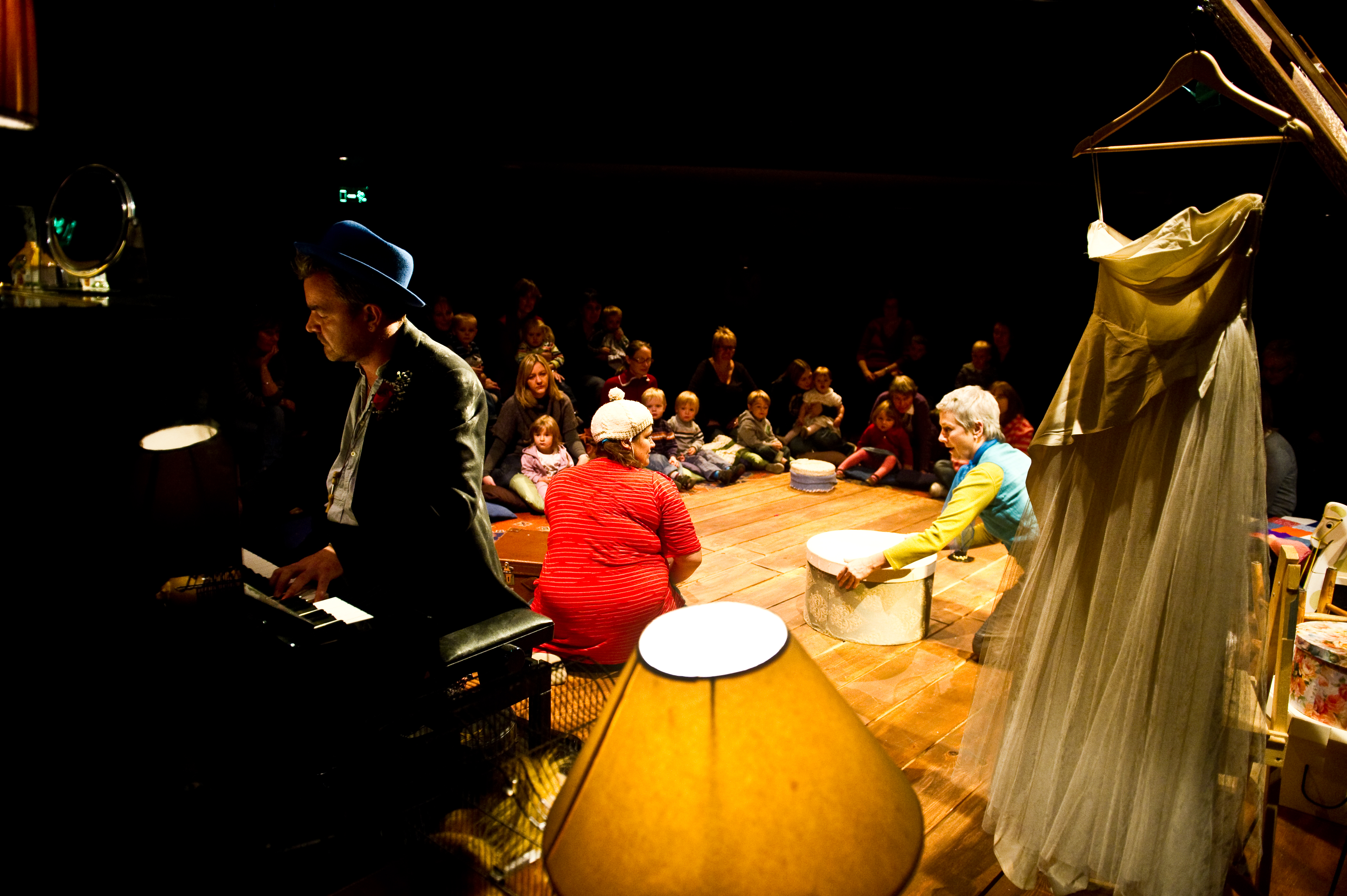
Production image from The Attic, produced by Starcatchers. October 2010.

Theatre for younger audiences, especially very young children, has grown enormously in popularity since the 1980s, and has been described as "a particular strength in contemporary Scottish theatre". A major player in this area is Imaginate, the development agency for performing arts for children and young people, based in Edinburgh. As well as artist development and creative learning, Imaginate also delivers the annual Imaginate Festival, now one of the largest international festivals in the world, and engages in research. Between 2009 and 2011, Imaginate supported Starcatchers, a production company creating performing arts experiences for children from birth to four. As critic Mark Fisher has noted, "one of Scottish theatre’s great success stories is the number of exceptional children’s companies to have emerged over the last 20 years", including Frozen Charlotte, Wee Stories, Visible Fictions, Catherine Wheels Theatre Company and TAG Theatre Company.

== Music hall ==
Harry Lauder. Note use of tartan and a stereotypical Scottish image.

Music hall was a form of variety light entertainment common in Scotland from the mid-19th to the mid-20th century. With the arrival of cinema, radio and television, its influence began to wane. However, something of the flavour of Scottish music hall can still be seen in many Scottish pantomimes. Music hall is not strictly theatre, but it can contain dramatic elements and small sketches. It tended towards sentimentality, light humour and the singalong, rather than high-brow dramatic entertainment.

Music hall was often working class recreation, and the temperance movement encouraged it as an alternative to drinking. Despite this, music hall contained frequent double entendres and sexual humour. A notable feature of Scottish music hall was its frequent use of exaggerated forms of Highland Dress. It had some overlap with the Kailyard movement as well.

Reaction to Scottish music hall was mixed. Hugh MacDiarmid was particularly disparaging, particularly to Harry Lauder. MacDiarmid said, "[I have] never met a single, intelligent Scot who would be seen at Lauder performance" and quipped that Lauder was so funny no one could remember any of his jokes.

== Theatre festivals in Scotland ==
The best known theatre festivals in Scotland at the Edinburgh International Festival and Edinburgh Festival Fringe which take place annually in August. Much of the material in these festivals, however, tends to be of non-Scottish origin. Other Edinburgh festivals include the Imaginate Festival of Theatre for Children and Young People, held in May each year and originally known as the Scottish Children's Theatre Festival, Manipulate - the Visual Theatre Festival and the Edinburgh People's Festival. Glasgow festivals include the Glasgay! Festival and the Buzzcut festival of live art, held at the Pearce Institute in Govan.

== Theatre companies in Scotland ==
=== 7:84 Scotland ===
7:84 Scotland began in 1971 with a premiere of John McGrath's Trees in the Wind at the Edinburgh Festival. In 1972, the same play was performed at a May Day rally in Edinburgh, and also an occupied factory in Glasgow. The likes of Leni Lean and David MacLennan moved to other companies from 7:84, such as Wild Cat.

However, by far their biggest success was "the Cheviot". As David Edgar writes:

"7:84 Scotland's use of the ceilidh form in The Cheviot, the Stag, and the Black Black Oil succeeded because it drew on a rural folk-form, and indeed was directed at audiences in the rural Highlands of Scotland."

The Cheviot toured Ireland successfully later on, both rural and Dublin.

The Game's a Bogey discussed the life of John MacLean, amongst other things, but resorted to obvious joke names, such as Sir Mungo McBungle for a failed industrialist, and Andy McChuckemup for a Glaswegian wheeler dealer. 7:84 produced a number of other plays during the period, but The Cheviot remained by far and away the most successful. It was eventually recorded as a television programme, albeit with some modifications to thank BBC censors.

By the end of the decade, the nucleus of 7:84 had broken up, and many other people started their own political theatre companies.

== Theatres in Scotland ==
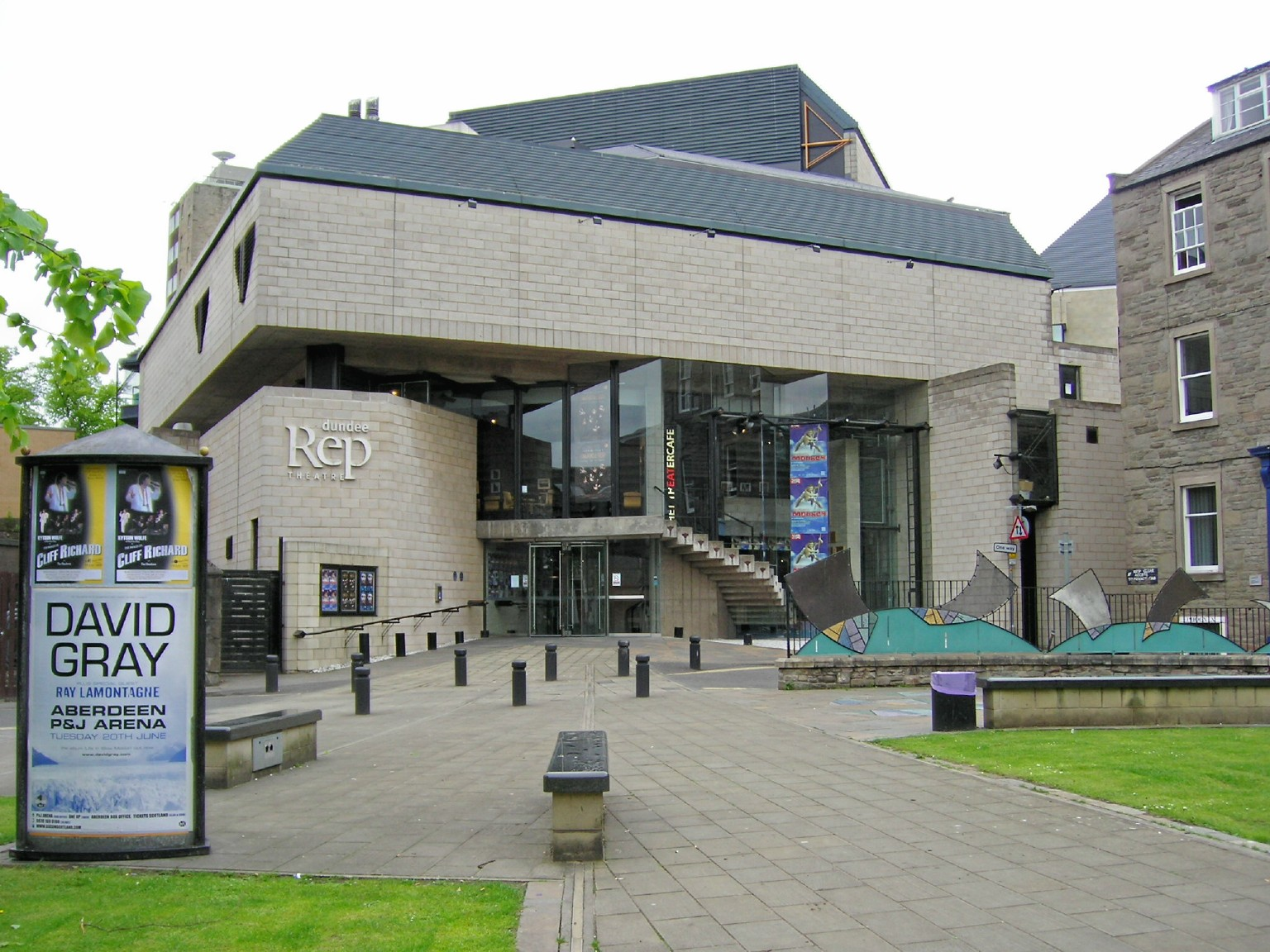
The Dundee Rep

All of Scotland's major cities have theatres, as well as regional centres, such as Dumfries, Mull, Perth and Ayr. In more rural areas, plays are often performed in community halls, church halls, arts spaces etc.

== See also ==
- Category:Scottish dramatists and playwrights
- Category:Scottish plays
- English drama
- List of Scottish dramatists
- List of Irish theatres and theatre companies
- The Cambridge History of British Theatre
- Theatre of the United Kingdom
- Theatre of Wales
- Irish theatre
- List of theatres in the United Kingdom
