= Saviour Pirotta =

Maltese-born British children's writer

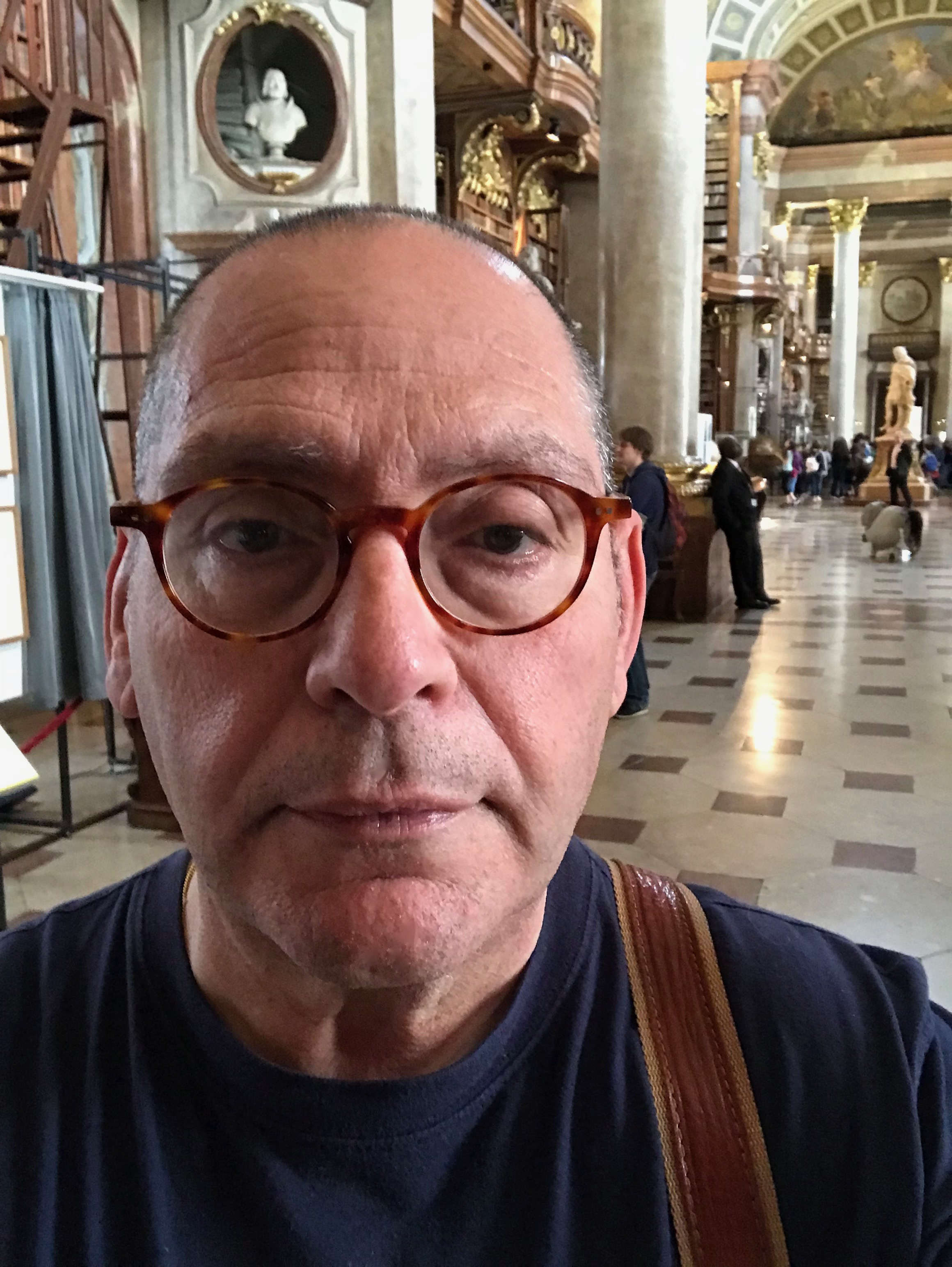
- Pirotta at the Austrian National Library in Vienna in 2018
- Born: 1958 (age 67–68); Malta
- Occupation: Author
- Writing career
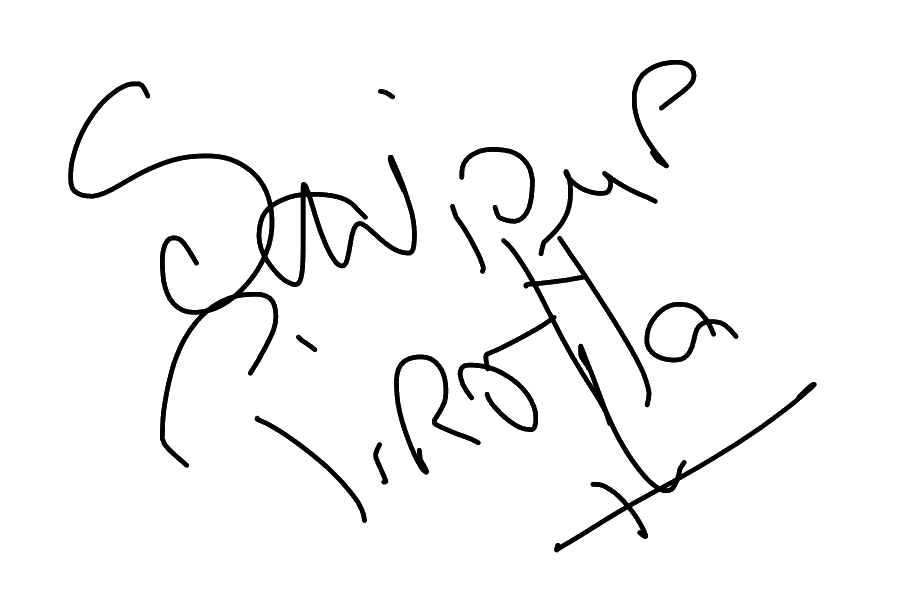
- Years active: 1986–present
- Genres: Children's picture books, Greek myths, fiction, historical fiction, detective stories, non-fiction
- Notable works: The Orchard Book of First Greek Myths, Firebird, The Wolfsong Series
- Website: saviourpirotta.com

Saviour Pirotta is a Maltese-born British author and playwright who resides in England. He is mostly known for the bestselling The Stolen Spear, The Golden Horsemen of Baghdad, The Orchard Book of First Greek Myths and an adaptation of the Russian folktale, Firebird, and the Ancient Greek Mysteries Series for Bloomsbury. His books are particularly successful in the UK, Greece, Italy and South Korea.

== Childhood ==
The second of five brothers, Pirotta grew up speaking both English and Maltese. He attended Naxxar Primary School (now Maria Regina College) and later won a scholarship to St Aloysius' College. He developed a love of literature early on in life when he discovered the Narnia books by C.S. Lewis, Ian Serraillier's The Silver Sword and R.L. Stevenson's Treasure Island. The author's parents, both extremely devout Catholics, discouraged his general interest in the arts and censored most television programmes but Pirotta cites as visual influences on his writing the works of film animator Ray Harryhausen and Alexander Korda.

== Career in the UK ==
Pirotta emigrated to the UK in 1981 where his first job was directing three short plays for Moonshine Community Arts Workshop in London, an offshoot of Brian Way's pioneering Theatre Centre. This brought him to the attention of the Commonwealth Institute, where he worked as a storyteller till 1989.

The children's play was subsequently published by Samuel French and Pirotta has since concentrated on writing. His first efforts were picture books but he soon moved into non-fiction, specialising in pirates and religious festivals. His Pirates and Treasure, published in the UK, the US, Russia and Sweden in 1995 is widely considered to be the first children's book about sea-robbers with a multi-cultural viewpoint. For a while he also wrote science books for the very young using the pen name Sam Godwin. A Seed in Need – a first look at life cycle of a flower – won him the 1998 English Association Award for best non-fiction picture book.

Turtle Bay, published by Frances Lincoln in the UK and Farrar, Straus, Giroux in the United States, was selected by the National Science Teachers Association (NSTA) and assembled in co-operation with The Children's Book Council (CBC) as a Notable Science Trade Book of 1998. American Bookseller also chose it as one of their fall children's books 'pick of the list'. In the US, excerpts from his works are often used by homeschoolers and in schools for multiple choice tests.

In November 2010, his picture book Firebird was awarded an Aesop Accolade by the American Folklore Society. It shared the honour with Eric A. Kimmel's Joha Makes a Wish: A Middle Eastern Tale and Cloud Tea Monkeys by Mal Peet and Elspeth Graham. It also won a Best Book Award from the Oppenheim Toy Portfolio.

In November 2016, The Bookseller announced that Saviour Pirotta and his then agents Pollinger Ltd had signed a contract with Bloomsbury Publishing for a series of middle grade adventure stories set in Ancient Greece. The series was titled Ancient Greek Mysteries. The first title, Mark of the Cyclops, published in March 2017 and the second, Secret of the Oracle followed in October. Two more titles appeared in 2018. These were called Pirates of Poseidon and Shadow of the Centaurs.

In 2018, Maverick Books announced a four book series by Pirotta set in the Neolithic period entitled Wolfsong. The first book, The Stolen Spear was published in August 2019. In January 2019, Bloomsbury also published another adventure, this time set in the golden age of Islam called The Golden Horsemen of Baghdad.

The author is now a British citizen and lives in Scarborough, North Yorkshire.

== Work in Translation ==
Pirotta's books have been translated and published by major commercial publishers in various countries, including the United States, Australia, Canada, Italy, France, Spain, Slovakia, Holland, Portugal, Germany, Rumania, Belgium, Sweden, Brazil, Thailand, Greece, Estonia, Poland, Russia, Lebanon, Japan, South Africa, Indonesia and South Korea. In 2020, Pirotta's literary agents signed a translation deal with Midsea Books in Malta to produce his Stone Age Wolfsong series, which is partly set on the island. The series is translated by Noel Tanti. In 2021, Midsea Books also published Pirotta's set of ten First Greek Myths.

== Collaborations ==
Pirotta has collaborated with some of the biggest names in children's illustration today, including Jane Ray, Emma Chichester Clark, Catherine Hyde, Chris Riddell, Chris Mould, Jan Lewis, Alan Marks, Toni Goffe and Richard Johnson.

== Theatre ==
In July 2019, the Stephen Joseph Theatre in Scarborough, North Yorkshire, announced that it is staging the world premiere of Pirotta's first professional play for children, Granny's Exploding Toilet, in the autumn. The entire run was sold out. Pirotta was commissioned to write a second play, an adaptation of Little Red Riding Hood for the SJT. It was scheduled for April 2020 but the production was halted by the pandemic. In 2024 Teatru Malta announced that Pirotta had adapted his bestselling series First Greek Myths into a family musical to be performed at Teatru Salesjan in Sliema ahead of a European tour. Called Miti, Miti the show was part of the Ziguzajg children's theatre festival. A further production was held at Teatro Due in Parma, Italy. The musical was also staged at the Espace Gruber Theatre in Strasbourg during a weekend called Une Journee de Aventures Literarires. This was part of Malta's celebration of its EU presidency in 2025.

== Festival appearances ==
Pirotta has appeared at the Edinburgh Children's Book Festival, the Bradford Literary Festival, the Northern Children's Book Festival, the Swansea Book Festival, the Scarborough Literary Festival, the Linton Book Festival, the Liverpool Children's Festival of Reading, the Big Malarkey in Hull and the Beverley LitUp Festival.

== Awards and honours ==
- The Heart Scarab was longlisted for the Sparkle Book Awards, 2022 - 2023.
- Pandora's Box won the Fiction Express Readers Award for Best Fiction, 2020.
- The Golden Horsemen of Baghdad was shortlisted for the North Somerset Teachers' Book Award for Quality Fiction, 2019.
- The Unicorn Prince was included in The Guardian's Books of the Month in October 2018.
- Mark of the Cyclops was shortlisted for the Historical Association Young Quills Award, 2018.
- Mark of the Cyclops won the North Somerset Teachers' Book Award for Quality Fiction, 2018.
- Firebird won an Aesop Accolade in the US, 2010.
- Firebird won the Oppenheim Toy Portfolio Gold Award, 2010.
- The Orchard Book of First Greek Myths was included in the Ultimate Young Book Guide, 2002.

== Selected works ==
FICTION

- An Elephant for the Emperor, Bloomsbury 2026
- The Book of Songs, Maverick 2026
- The Case of the Blue Mask, Fiction Express 2025
- Crash Landing, Fiction Express 2024
- Earth Shaker, Fiction Express 2022
- The Heart Scarab (Book 1 of The Nile Adventures), Maverick 2022
- The Crocodile Curse (Book 2 of The Nile Adventures), Maverick 2022
- The Jackal's Graveyard (Book 3 of The Nile Adventures), Maverick 2023
- The Serpent's Eclipse (Book 4 of The Nile Adventures), Maverick 2024
- The Search for the Copper Scroll, Fiction Express 2022
- Tears of the Sun God, Fiction Express 2021
- The Stolen Spear (Book 1 of the Wolfsong Series), Maverick 2019
- The Whispering Stones (Book 2 of the Wolfsong Series), Maverick 2020
- The Mysterious Island (Book 3 of the Wolfsong Series), Maverick 2021
- The Wolf's Song (Book 4 of the Wolfsong Series), Maverick 2022
- The Golden Horsemen of Baghdad, Bloomsbury 2019
- The River Queen, Fiction Express 2018
- The River King, Fiction Express 2018
- The River Prince, Fiction Express 2019
- Pandora's Box, Fiction Express 2020
- Mark of the Cyclops - An Ancient Greek Mystery, Bloomsbury 2017
- Secret of the Oracle - An Ancient Greek Mystery, Bloomsbury 2017
- Pirates of Poseidon - An Ancient Greek Mystery, Bloomsbury 2018
- Shadow of the Centaurs - An Ancient Greek Mystery, Bloomsbury 2018
- The Warrior Princess, Fiction Express 2017
- My Cousin the Minotaur, Fiction Express 2016
- Shadowcave, Fiction Express 2017

ANTHOLOGIES

- Storyworld [illustrated by Fiona Small], Blackie & Sons, 1988 [re-issued as Tales From Around the World in 1994]
- Joy to the World: Christmas Stories from around the Globe [illustrated by Sheila Moxley], Frances Lincoln/Harpercollins, 1998
- The Sleeping Princess and other Fairy Tales from Grimm [illustrated by Emma Chichester Clark], Orchard Books 2002 [titled The MacElderry Book of Grimm's Fairy Tales in the US]
- The Orchard Book of First Greek Myths [illustrated by Jan Lewis], Orchard Books, 2003
- Once upon a World [illustrated by Alan Marks], Watts/Sea to Sea Publications, 2004
- Aesop's Fables [illustrated by Richard Johnson], Kingfisher 2005
- Around the World in 80 Tales [illustrated by Richard Johnson], Kingfisher 2007
- Children's Stories from the Bible [illustrated by Ian Andrew and Anne Yvonne Gilbert], Templar 2008
- Orchard Ballet Stories for Young Children [illustrated by Brigette Barrager], Orchard Books, 2016.

EARLY READERS

- First Greek Myths, ten books [illustrated by Jan Lewis], Orchard Books, March 2008/2010
- Grimm's Fairy Tales, eight books [illustrated by Cecilia Johansson], Orchard Books, March 2012/ paperback January 2013

PICTURE BOOKS

- Solomon's Secret [illustrated by Helen Cooper], Methuen/Dial 1989
- Do You Believe in Magic? JM Dent, 1990
- Little Bird [illustrated by Steve Butler], Frances Lincoln/Tambourine 1992
- Turtle Bay [illustrated by Nilesh Mistry], Frances Lincoln/Farrar Straus Giroux, 1998 [re-issued as Turtle Watch, 2008]
- Patrick Paints a Picture [illustrated by Linz West], Frances Lincoln 2008
- Firebird [illustrated by Catherine Hyde], Templar September 2010/paperback, 2014
- George and the Dragon, [illustrated by Martina Peluso], harpercollins 2015
- The Talking Bird, [illustrated by Louise Pigott], harpercollins, 2017
- The Unicorn Prince [illustrated by Jane Ray] Orchard Books 2018
