= Crab Moon =

Children's picture book by Ruth Horowitz

- First edition
- Author: Ruth Horowitz
- Illustrator: Kate Kiesler
- Language: English
- Series: Read and Wonder
- Genre: Fiction
- Published: 2004 (Candlewick Press, Somerville, Ma.)
- Publication place: United States
- Media type: Print
- Pages: 32
- ISBN: 978-0-7636-2313-5

Crab Moon is a children's picture book by Ruth Horowitz and illustrated by Kate Kiesler. It was selected by the National Science Teachers Association as an Outstanding Science Trade Books for Children in 2001.

== Summary ==
A young child, David, follows his mother to the summer rental and is amazed at horseshoe crabs that emerge to lay their eggs. The next morning, he finds an upside down crab and he places her right-side up.

== Reception ==
A Kirkus Reviews review says, "Along with books such as Saviour Pirotta's Turtle Bay (1997), this conveys a respectful attitude toward sea- and shore-dwelling wildlife in an unpreachy way. Young children whose interest is piqued by David's brief encounter with such ancient, alien-looking creatures will welcome the concluding page of general horseshoe crab facts". A review in The New York Times says, "In Ms. Kiesler's inviting pictures, you can virtually smell the salt air. Publishers Weekly in their review said that "Horowitz's poetic descriptions are buried throughout the text as smooth as sea glass. The reader sees how 'the fat, round face of the full moon wavered on the surface of the water' and 'curly black seaweed was strewn on the sand, like streamers left over from a party.' Kiesler's seascapes are skillfully rendered but static, trading the ethereal qualities of her Fishing for a Dream for realism. Glowing yet somber, they do little to engage readers' emotions in Daniel's mild adventure." Patricia Manning, in her review for School Library Journal, said that "Horowitz's quiet text reflects the moonlit awe of this ageless pattern, and Kiesler's luminous oils capture freeze-frame moments in perfect step."
