= The Cambridge History of British Theatre =

- An image of the Volume 1 book cover
- Author: Jane Milling, Peter Thomson, Baz Kershaw, Joseph Walter Donohue, eds.
- Subject: Theater-Great Britain-English drama-History and criticism.
- Genre: History
- Set in: Ancient Rome to present day
- Published: 2004, 2015
- Publisher: Cambridge University Press
- Publication place: Great Britain
- Media type: Print, web
- Pages: 3 Volumes
- ISBN: 978-0-521-82790-4
- OCLC: 799877340
- Dewey Decimal: 792/.0941
- LC Class: PN2581.C36 2004
- Website: Cambridge Core

The Cambridge History of British Theatre is a non-fiction work consisting of three volumes in book form. It was originally published in 2004 by Cambridge University Press. It was later published online in 2008, also by Cambridge University Press. It is not an encyclopedia. Essay articles are in rough chronological order and have been compiled in the three volumes by various editors.

== About the books ==
Volume 1 covers the British theatre from its Roman colony origins to 1660, when Charles II was about to be restored to the throne. Volume 2 covers a little over two centuries, beginning with Charles II's restoration in 1660, until the beginning of the twentieth century, approximately 1895. Volume three covers the British theatre from 1895.

== See also ==
- London theatre closure 1642
- King's Men § Aftermath for the history of one company affected by the prohibition
- William Robbins an actor who lost his living, and fought and died for the Royalist cause.
- Antitheatricality 16th and 17th century
- English Renaissance theatre
- Theatre of Scotland
- Returning to Shakespeare

== See also ==
- The Cambridge Illustrated History of British Theatre
