= The Orchard Book of First Greek Myths =

Children's book by Saviour Pirotta, illustrated by Jan Lewis

- First edition, 2003
- Author: Saviour Pirotta
- Cover artist: Jan Lewis
- Language: English
- Genre: Myths
- Publisher: Orchard Books
- Publication date: 28 August 2003
- Publication place: United Kingdom
- Media type: Print (Hardcover)
- Pages: 96 pp (first edition, hardback)
- ISBN: 978-1841217758

The Orchard Book of First Greek Myths is a children's book by Saviour Pirotta, illustrated by Jan Lewis. First published in hardback by Orchard Books, an imprint of Hachette Book Group in 2003, it has become a favourite with many schools and families exploring ancient Greek myths with children aged five to eight. It has been reprinted twelve times as of 2019 and spawned a series of stand-alone books with simplified text and more pictures.

The book is part of a series of highly illustrated anthologies which also includes Geraldine McCaughrean's The Orchard Book of Greek Myths, Michael Morpurgo's Aesop's Fables and the author's own The Orchard Book of Grimm's Fairytales.

The stories in both the anthology and the series include:

- Odysseus and the wooden horse
- Perseus and the monstrous Medusa
- Arachne, the spider-woman
- Pegasus, the flying horse
- Arion, the dolphin boy
- Jason and the Golden Fleece
- King Midas's Goldfingers
- Theseus and the Minotaur
- The secret of Pandora's box
- Icarus, the boy who could fly

The book has very successful imprints in Brazil [Scipione], Italy [Einaudi Ragazzi, an imprint of Arnoldo Mondadori Editore], Greece [Patakis] and Korea where the books are also available with an audio cd in both Korean and English. In Italy where the book is called Ai Piedi Dell' Olimpo [At the foot of Mount Olympus], there have been five different editions, one of which is included in a collection of classics called Lo Scaffale D'Oro [the golden bookcase] and was sold at a special price with the Italian newspaper, Corriere Della Sera.

== Critical reception ==
Critical reception for the book was very positive with the National Literacy Association describing the stories as 'Remarkable retellings of these old stories using vivid, glorious language.'. The Bookseller said the retellings 'will provide a welcome balance to the zanier or Disney-style introductions to the famous myths on offer to young children.

Dogobooks, a children's book review website, called the series "a wonderful set of straightforward, friendly and accessible Greek Myth retellings, with clear type and irresistible illustrations. All the favourite stories are here."

Karen Wallace, reviewing for The Ultimate Book Guide, enthused "These six retellings of Greek Myths are short and well-balanced and the language is fresh and immediate. The full-colour illustrations throughout the book are dramatic and engaging."

== Co-editions ==
The book is published by Einaudi Ragazzi in Italy as Ai Piedi Dell' Olimpo. There have been four editions to date, in both hardback and paperback. The book has also had Greek and Korean editions. The series is published by Patakis Press in Greece where it has had several editions and Scipione in Brazil. The Korean editions come with dual language cds.

The series has also been adapted by Inception Media as enhanced apps, and audio versions of all ten books are available from cloudaloud.
