= Firebird (Pirotta picture book) =

2010 picture book written by Saviour Pirotta and illustrated by Catherine Hyde

- First edition, 2010
- Author: Saviour Pirotta
- Illustrator: Catherine Hyde
- Cover artist: Catherine Hyde
- Language: English
- Genre: Folktales
- Publisher: Templar Publishing
- Publication date: 28 August 2010
- Publication place: United Kingdom
- Media type: Print (Hardcover, paperback)
- Pages: 40 pp (first edition, hardback)
- ISBN: 978-1848771512

Firebird is a 2010 picture book written by Saviour Pirotta illustrated by Catherine Hyde. It was published by Templar Publishing in the United Kingdom and by Candlewick Press in the United States. Firebird won an Aesop Accolade from the American Folklore Society and a Best Book Award from the Oppenheim Toy Portfolio. It was also nominated for the Kate Greenaway medal in the UK.

== History ==
Hyde, an artist based in Cornwall, had already illustrated a first book for Templar Publishing called The Princess' Blankets and written by poet Carol Ann Duffy. 2010 was the centenary of Stravinsky's Firebird Ballet and the publishers wanted to celebrate with a picture book retelling of the story. Hyde was asked to produce some sketches which served as the inspiration for Pirotta's version. The story is based on Tsarevitch Ivan, the Firebird and the Gray Wolf, a Russian folktale that was one of the inspirations for the ballet. Pirotta's version is shortened and has a different ending from the original. Pirotta sets the firebird free, in tribute to activists in his country of origin who were canvassing the government to stop recreational hunting and bird trapping.

== Reception ==
Firebird has been positively received. WriteAway.org said about it, "Saviour Pirotta’s retelling of this story is note perfect. His language is rich and elevated without being ostentatious or disrupting the flow and pace of the storytelling. The cadences of the storytelling voice create a timeless mood and the story reads aloud beautifully." Booktrust called it "a wonderful retelling" and remarked that "Catherine Hyde’s beautiful, atmospheric paintings perfectly capture the fairytale quality of the story."

The Bookseller noted that 'it is told in a clear, engaging style by talented storyteller Saviour Pirotta." while Playground Diaries wrote that "Saviour Pirotta takes his readers on a magical journey through the pages of his book Firebird. Based on a Russian ballet, Pirotta’s masterfully illustrated story contains heroism, triumph, love, friendship and freedom.

Valerie Coghlan reviewing for Books for Keeps stated that "The retelling of the story of a youngest son who overcomes obstacles to capture the glorious firebird who has been stealing his royal father’s golden apples is beautifully recounted, and is brilliantly paired with artwork that makes this a very splendid volume indeed." and Kirkus Reviews found "The full-page acrylic paintings dominate the book with their atmospheric, nighttime settings and elegant gold lines."
