= Theatre of the United Kingdom =

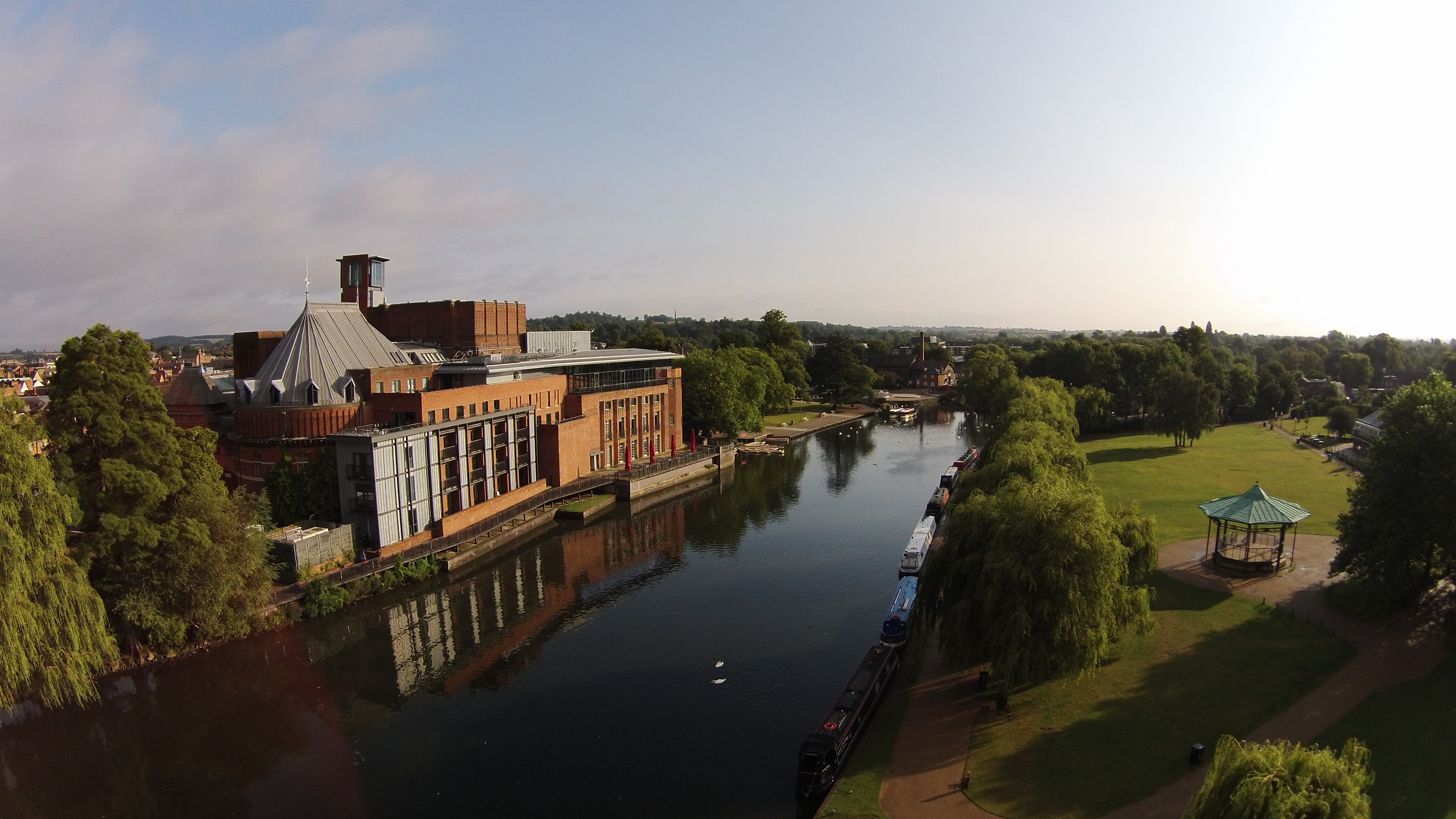
The Royal Shakespeare Theatre, opened in Stratford-upon-Avon in 1932, named after the famous playwright, William Shakespeare

Theatre of United Kingdom plays an important part in British culture, and the countries that constitute the UK have had a vibrant tradition of theatre since the Renaissance with roots going back to the Roman occupation.

== Beginnings ==
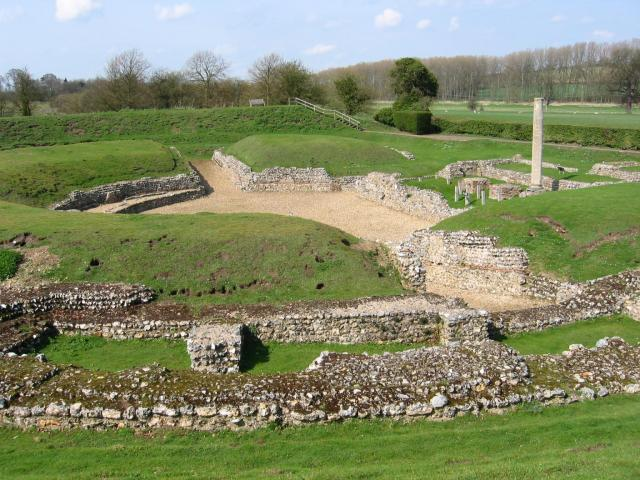
Roman theatre excavated at Verulamium

Theatre was introduced from Europe to what is now the United Kingdom by the Romans and auditoriums were constructed across the country for this purpose (an example has been excavated at Verulamium). By the medieval period, theatre had developed with the mummers' plays, a form of early street theatre associated with the Morris dance, concentrating on themes such as Saint George and the Dragon and Robin Hood. These were folk tales re-telling old stories, and the actors travelled from town to town performing these for their audiences in return for money and hospitality.

== Medieval theatre: 500–1500 ==
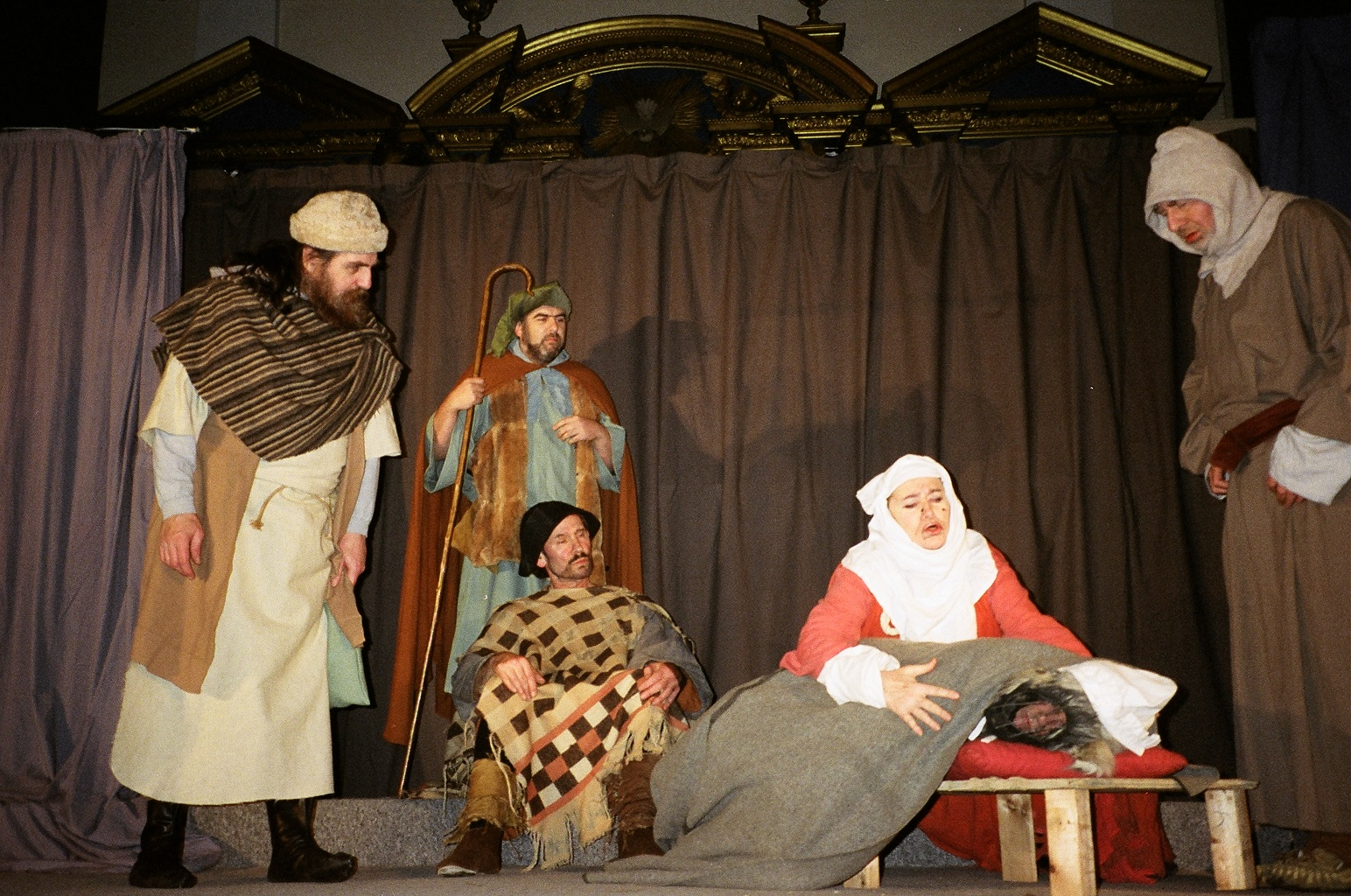
A moment from The Second Shepherds' Play in the Wakefield Mystery Plays as performed by The Players of St Peter in London in 2005

The medieval mystery plays and morality plays, which dealt with Christian themes, were performed at religious festivals. The most important work of literature surviving from the Middle Cornish period is An Ordinale Kernewek ("The Cornish Ordinalia"), a 9000-line religious drama composed around the year 1400. The longest single surviving work of Cornish literature is Bywnans Meriasek (The Life of Meriasek), a play dated 1504, but probably copied from an earlier manuscript.

There are four complete or nearly complete extant English biblical collections of plays from the late medieval period; although these collections are sometimes referred to as "cycles," it is now believed that this term may attribute to these collections more coherence than they in fact possess. The most complete is the York cycle of forty-eight pageants. They were performed in the city of York, from the middle of the fourteenth century until 1569. There are also the Towneley plays of thirty-two pageants, once thought to have been a true 'cycle' of plays and most likely performed around the Feast of Corpus Christi probably in the town of Wakefield, England during the late Middle Ages until 1576. The Ludus Coventriae (also called the N Town plays" or Hegge cycle), now generally agreed to be a redacted compilation of at least three older, unrelated plays, and the Chester cycle of twenty-four pageants, now generally agreed to be an Elizabethan reconstruction of older medieval traditions.

These biblical plays differ widely in content. Most contain episodes such as the Fall of Lucifer, the Creation and Fall of Man, Cain and Abel, Noah and the Flood, Abraham and Isaac, the Nativity, the Raising of Lazarus, the Passion, and the Resurrection. Other pageants included the story of Moses, the Procession of the Prophets, Christ's Baptism, the Temptation in the Wilderness, and the Assumption and Coronation of the Virgin. In given cycles, the plays came to be sponsored by the newly emerging Medieval craft guilds.

Having grown out of the religiously based mystery plays of the Middle Ages, the morality play is a genre of Medieval and early Tudor theatrical entertainment, which represented a shift towards a more secular base for European theatre. In their own time, these plays were known as "interludes", a broader term given to dramas with or without a moral theme. Morality plays are a type of allegory in which the protagonist is met by personifications of various moral attributes who try to prompt him to choose a Godly life over one of evil. The plays were most popular in Europe during the 15th and 16th centuries.

== Renaissance theatre: 1500–1660 ==
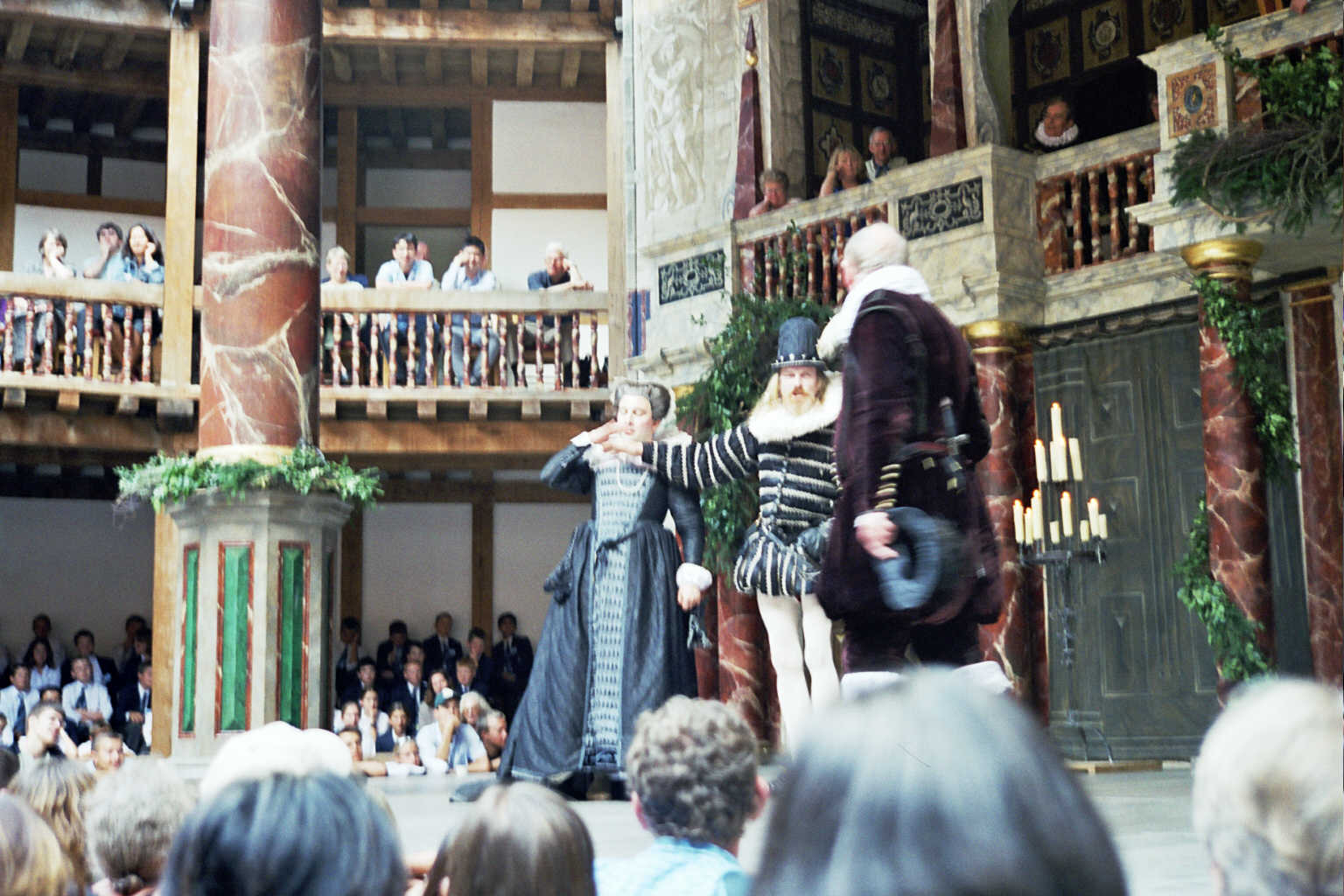
The Comedy of Errors in performance at the Shakespeare's Globe Theatre in 2002

The reign of Elizabeth I in the late 16th and early 17th century saw a flowering of the drama and all the arts. Perhaps the most famous playwright in the world, William Shakespeare, wrote around 40 plays that are still performed in theatres across the world to this day. They include tragedies, such as Hamlet (1603), Othello (1604), and King Lear (1605); comedies, such as A Midsummer Night's Dream (1594–96) and Twelfth Night (1602); and history plays, such as Henry IV, Part 1. The Elizabethan age is sometimes nicknamed the "Age of Shakespeare" for the influence he held over the era. Other important Elizabethan and 17th-century playwrights include Ben Jonson, Christopher Marlowe, and John Webster.

The English playwrights were intrigued by the Italian model as a conspicuous community of Italian actors had settled in London. The linguist and lexicographer John Florio (1553–1625), whose father was Italian, was a royal language tutor at the Court of James I, and a possible friend and influence on William Shakespeare, had brought much of the Italian language and culture to England. The earliest Elizabethan plays includes Gorboduc (1561) by Sackville and Norton as well as The Spanish Tragedy, or Hieronimo is Mad Again, Elizabethan tragedy written by Thomas Kyd between 1582 and 1592. Highly popular and influential in its time, The Spanish Tragedy established a new genre in English literature theatre, the revenge play or revenge tragedy. Its plot contains several violent murders and includes as one of its characters a personification of Revenge. The Spanish Tragedy was often referred to, or parodied, in works written by other Elizabethan playwrights, including William Shakespeare, Ben Jonson, and Christopher Marlowe. Many elements of The Spanish Tragedy, such as the play-within-a-play used to trap a murderer and a ghost intent on vengeance, appear in Shakespeare's Hamlet. Thomas Kyd is frequently proposed as the author of the hypothetical Ur-Hamlet that may have been one of Shakespeare's primary sources for Hamlet.

George Chapman (c. 1559–1634) was a successful playwright who produced comedies (his collaboration on Eastward Hoe led to his brief imprisonment in 1605 as it offended the King with its anti-Scottish sentiment), tragedies (most notably Bussy D'Ambois) and court masques (The Memorable Masque of the Middle Temple and Lincoln's Inn).

David Lyndsay's Ane Pleasant Satyre of the Thrie Estaitis (1552), is a surviving example of a Scots dramatic tradition in the period that has otherwise largely been lost. James Wedderburn is recorded as having written anti-Catholic tragedies and comedies in Scots around 1540 before being forced to flee into exile. Although the propaganda value of drama in the Scottish Reformation was important, the Kirk hardened its attitude to such public entertainments. In 1599 James VI had to intervene to overturn a prohibition on attending performances by a visiting theatre troupe from England. Scottish drama did not succeed in becoming a popular artform in the face of religious opposition and the absence of King and court after 1603. As with drama in England, only a small proportion of plays written and performed were actually published, and the smaller production in Scotland meant that a much less significant record of Scottish drama remains to us. The ribald verse play in Scots, Philotus, is known from an anonymous edition published in London in 1603.

Drama in Wales as a literary tradition dates to morality plays from north-east Wales in the second half of the 15th century. The development of Renaissance theatre in England did not have great influence in Wales as the gentry found different forms of artistic patronage. One surviving example of Welsh literary drama is Troelus a Chresyd, an anonymous adaptation from poems by Henrysoun and Chaucer dating to around 1600. With no urban centres to compare to England to support regular stages, morality plays and interludes continued to circulate in inn-yard theatres and fairs, supplemented by visiting troupes performing English repertoire.

== Restoration theatre: 1660 to 1710 ==
During the Interregnum 1642–1660, English theatres were kept closed by the Puritans for religious and ideological reasons. When the London theatres opened again with the Restoration of the monarchy in 1660, they flourished under the personal interest and support of Charles II (reigned 1660–1685). Wide and socially mixed audiences were attracted by topical writing and by the introduction of the first professional actresses (in Shakespeare's time, all female roles had been played by boys). New genres of the Restoration were heroic drama, pathetic drama, and Restoration comedy. The Restoration plays that have best retained the interest of producers and audiences today are the comedies, such as William Wycherley's The Country Wife (1676), The Rover (1677) by the first professional woman playwright, Aphra Behn, and John Vanbrugh's The Relapse (1696). Restoration comedy is famous or notorious for its sexual explicitness, a quality encouraged by Charles II personally and by the rakish aristocratic ethos of his court.

Although documented history of Irish theatre began at least as early as 1601, the earliest Irish dramatists of note were: William Congreve (1670–1729), author of The Way of the World (1700); late Restoration playwright, George Farquhar (?1677–1707), The Recruiting Officer (1706); as well as two of the most successful playwrights on the London stage in the 18th century, Oliver Goldsmith (?1730–74), She Stoops to Conquer (1773) and Richard Brinsley Sheridan (1751–1816), The School for Scandal (1777). Anglo-Irish drama in the 18th century also includes Charles Macklin (?1699–1797), and Arthur Murphy (1727–1805). Thomas Sydserf was behind the establishment in Edinburgh of the first regular theatre in Scotland, and his 1667 play Tarugo's Wiles: or, The Coffee-House, based on a Spanish play, was produced in London to amazement that a Scot could write such excellent English. Scottish poet John Ogilby, who was the first Irish Master of the Revels, had established the Werburgh Street Theatre, the first theatre in Ireland, in the 1630s. It was closed by the Puritans in 1641. The Restoration of the monarchy in Ireland enabled Ogilby to resume his position as Master of the Revels and open the first Theatre Royal in Dublin in 1662 in Smock Alley. In 1662 Katherine Philips went to Dublin where she completed a translation of Pierre Corneille's Pompée, produced with great success in 1663 in the Smock Alley Theatre, and printed in the same year both in Dublin and London. Although other women had translated or written dramas, her translation of Pompey broke new ground as the first rhymed version of a French tragedy in English and the first English play written by a woman to be performed on the professional stage. Aphra Behn (one of the women writers dubbed "The fair triumvirate of wit") was a prolific dramatist and one of the first English professional female writers. Her greatest dramatic success was The Rover (1677).

Theatre began to spread from the United Kingdom to the expanding British Empire. Farquhar's The Recruiting Officer was the first play to be staged in New York City on December 6, 1732. It was also the first play to be staged in the Colony of New South Wales, which is now Australia.

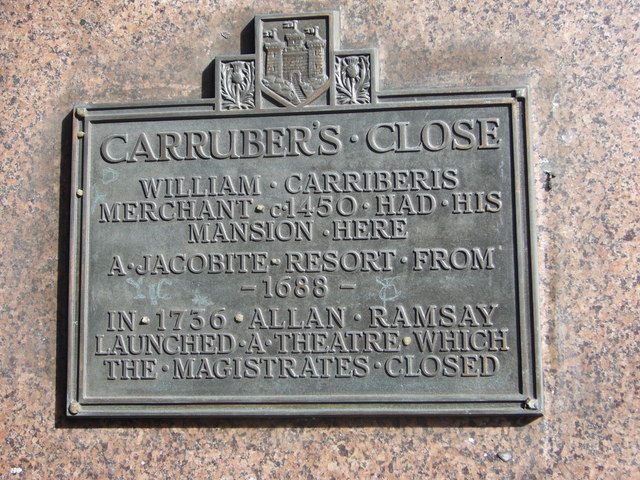
Carruber's Close, site of an early, but short-lived attempt by the poet, Allan Ramsay, to reintroduce theatre to Scotland in 1737

The age of Augustan drama was brought to an end by the censorship established by the Licensing Act 1737. After 1737, authors with strong political or philosophical points to make would no longer turn to the stage as their first hope of making a living, and novels began to have dramatic structures involving only normal human beings, as the stage was closed off for serious authors. Prior to the Licensing Act 1737, theatre was the first choice for most wits. After it, the novel was.

== 18th-century ==
In the 18th century, the highbrow and provocative Restoration comedy lost favour, to be replaced by sentimental comedy, domestic Bourgeois tragedy such as George Lillo's The London Merchant (1731), and by an overwhelming interest in Italian opera. Popular entertainment became more important in this period than ever before, with fair-booth burlesque and mixed forms that are the ancestors of the English music hall. These forms flourished at the expense of legitimate English drama, which went into a long period of decline. By the early 19th century it was no longer represented by stage plays at all, but by the closet drama, plays written to be privately read in a "closet" (a small domestic room).

== Romanticism: 1798–1836 ==
Percy Bysshe Shelley and Lord Byron were the most important literary dramatists of their time (although Shelley's plays were not performed until later in the century). Shakespeare was enormously popular, and began to be performed with texts closer to the original, as the drastic rewriting of 17th and 18th century performing versions for the theatre (as opposed to his plays in book form, which were also widely read) was gradually removed over the first half of the century.

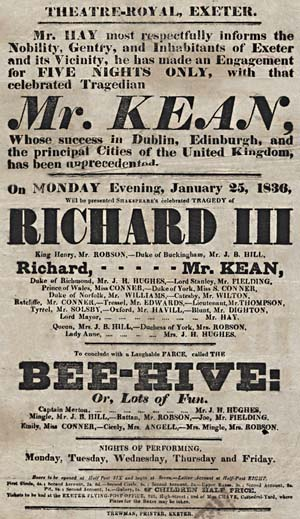
A Theatre Royal, Exeter playbill from 1836, featuring Charles Kean in a performance of Richard III

Melodramas, light comedies, operas, Shakespeare and classic English drama, pantomimes, translations of French farces and, from the 1860s, French operettas, continued to be popular, together with Victorian burlesque.

=== Scotland ===
Scottish "national drama" emerged in the early 1800s, as plays with specifically Scottish themes began to dominate the Scottish stage. The existing repertoire of Scottish-themed plays included John Home's Douglas (1756) and Ramsay's The Gentle Shepherd (1725), with the last two being the most popular plays among amateur groups. Douglas elicited the famous "Whaur's Yer Wullie Shakespeare Noo?" jeer from a member of one of its early audiences, and was also the subject of a number of pamphlets for and against it. It also arguably led to James MacPherson's Ossian cycle. Home was hounded by the church authorities for Douglas. It may have been this persecution which drove Home to write for the London stage, in addition to Douglas' success there, and stopped him from founding the new Scottish national theatre that some had hoped he would. Walter Scott was keenly interested in drama, becoming a shareholder in the Theatre Royal, Edinburgh. Baillie's Highland themed The Family Legend was first produced in Edinburgh in 1810 with the help of Scott, as part of a deliberate attempt to stimulate a national Scottish drama. Scott also wrote five plays, of which Hallidon Hill (1822) and MacDuff's Cross (1822), were patriotic Scottish histories. Adaptations of the Waverley novels, largely first performed in minor theatres, rather than the larger Patent theatres, included The Lady in the Lake (1817), The Heart of Midlothian (1819), and Rob Roy, which underwent over 1,000 performances in Scotland in this period. Also adapted for the stage were Guy Mannering, The Bride of Lammermoor and The Abbot. These highly popular plays saw the social range and size of the audience for theatre expand and helped shape theatre going practices in Scotland for the rest of the century.

== Victorian era: 1837–1901 ==
In 1847, a critic using the pseudonym Dramaticus published a pamphlet describing the parlous state of British theatre. Production of serious plays was restricted to the patent theatres, and new plays were subjected to censorship by the Lord Chamberlain's Office. At the same time, there was a burgeoning theatre sector featuring a diet of low melodrama and musical burlesque; but critics described British theatre as driven by commercialism and a 'star' system. Kotzebue's plays were translated into English and Thomas Holcroft's A Tale of Mystery was the first of many English melodramas. Pierce Egan, Douglas William Jerrold, Edward Fitzball, James Roland MacLaren and John Baldwin Buckstone initiated a trend towards more contemporary and rural stories in preference to the usual historical or fantastical melodramas. James Sheridan Knowles and Edward Bulwer-Lytton established a "gentlemanly" drama that began to re-establish the former prestige of the theatre with the aristocracy.

For much of the first half of the 19th century, drama in London and provincial theatres was restricted by a licensing system to the Patent theatre companies, and all other theatres could perform only musical entertainments (although magistrates had powers to license occasional dramatic performances). By the early 19th century, however, music hall entertainments had become popular, and provided a loophole in the restrictions on non-patent theatres in the genre of melodrama which did not contravene the Patent Acts, as it was accompanied by music. The passing of the Theatres Act 1843 removed the monopoly on drama held by the Patent theatres, enabling local authorities to license theatres as they saw fit, and also restricted the Lord Chamberlain's powers to censor new plays. The 1843 Act did not apply to Ireland where the power of the Lord Lieutenant to license patent theatres enabled control of stage performance analogous to that exercised by the Lord Chamberlain in Great Britain.

James Planché was a prolific playwright. He revolutionised stage productions of Shakespeare and the classics by introducing the use of historically appropriate costume design, working with antiquarians to establish what was known about period dress.

Dion Boucicault (1820–90) made the latest scientific inventions important elements in his plots and exerted considerable influence on theatrical production. His first big success, London Assurance (1841) was a comedy in the style of Sheridan, but he wrote in various styles, including melodrama. T. W. Robertson wrote popular domestic comedies and introduced a more naturalistic style of acting and stagecraft to the British stage in the 1860s.

A change came in the late 19th century with the plays on the London stage by the Irishmen George Bernard Shaw and Oscar Wilde and the Norwegian Henrik Ibsen, all of whom influenced domestic English drama and vitalised it again. The Shakespeare Memorial Theatre was opened in Shakespeare's birthplace Stratford upon Avon in 1879; and Herbert Beerbohm Tree founded an Academy of Dramatic Art at Her Majesty's Theatre in 1904.

Producer Richard D'Oyly Carte brought together librettist W. S. Gilbert and composer Arthur Sullivan, and nurtured their collaboration. Among Gilbert and Sullivan's best known comic operas are H.M.S. Pinafore, The Pirates of Penzance and The Mikado. Carte built the Savoy Theatre in 1881 to present their joint works, and through the inventor of electric light Sir Joseph Swan, the Savoy was the first theatre, and the first public building in the world, to be lit entirely by electricity. The success of Gilbert and Sullivan greatly expanded the audience for musical theatre. This, together with much improved street lighting and transportation in London led to a late Victorian and Edwardian theatre building boom in the West End.

== 20th-century ==
At the end of the century, Edwardian musical comedy came to dominate the musical stage.

Irish playwrights George Bernard Shaw (1856–1950) and John Millington Synge (1871–1909) were influential in British drama. Shaw's career as a playwright began in the last decade of the nineteenth century, while Synge's plays belong to the first decade of the twentieth century. Synge's most famous play, The Playboy of the Western World, "caused outrage and riots when it was first performed" in Dublin in 1907. George Bernard Shaw turned the Edwardian theatre into an arena for debate about important political and social issues, like marriage, class, "the morality of armaments and war" and the rights of women.

In the 1920s and later Noël Coward (1899–1973) achieved enduring success as a playwright, publishing more than 50 plays from his teens onwards. Many of his works, such as Hay Fever (1925), Private Lives (1930), Design for Living (1932), Present Laughter (1942) and Blithe Spirit (1941), have remained in the regular theatre repertoire. In the 1930s W. H. Auden and Christopher Isherwood co-authored verse dramas, of which The Ascent of F6 (1936) is the most notable, that owed much to Bertolt Brecht. T. S. Eliot had begun this attempt to revive poetic drama with Sweeney Agonistes in 1932, and this was followed by The Rock (1934), Murder in the Cathedral (1935) and Family Reunion (1939). There were three further plays after the war.

Saunders Lewis (1893–1985), writer in Welsh, was above all a dramatist. His earliest published play was Blodeuwedd (The woman of flowers) (1923–25, revised 1948). Other notable plays include Buchedd Garmon (The life of Germanus) (radio play, 1936) and several others after the war.

James Bridie, the pseudonym used by Osborne Henry Mavor (1888–1951), was a Scottish playwright, screenwriter and surgeon, considered to be a founding father of modern Scottish theatre, following his involvement with the founding of both the Citizens Theatre and Scotland's first college of drama, now known as the Royal Scottish Academy of Music and Drama.

=== After 1945 ===
The Edinburgh Festival Fringe started life when eight theatre companies turned up uninvited to the inaugural Edinburgh International Festival in 1947. Seven performed in Edinburgh, and one undertook a version of the medieval morality play "Everyman" in Dunfermline Abbey, about 20 miles north, across the Firth of Forth, in Fife. These groups aimed to take advantage of the large assembled theatre crowds to showcase their own, alternative, theatre. The Fringe got its name the following year (1948) after Robert Kemp, a Scottish playwright and journalist, wrote during the second Edinburgh International Festival: ‘Round the fringe of official Festival drama, there seems to be more private enterprise than before ... I am afraid some of us are not going to be at home during the evenings!’. The artistic credentials of the Fringe were established by the creators of the Traverse Theatre, John Calder, Jim Haynes and Richard Demarco in 1963. While their original objective was to maintain something of the Festival atmosphere in Edinburgh all year round, the Traverse Theatre quickly and regularly presented cutting edge drama to an international audience on both the Edinburgh International Festival and on the Fringe during August.

Sadler's Wells, under Lilian Baylis, nurtured talent that led to the development of an opera company, which became the English National Opera (ENO), a theatre company, which evolved into the National Theatre, and a ballet company, which eventually became the English Royal Ballet.

The Royal Shakespeare Company operates out of Stratford-upon-Avon, producing mainly but not exclusively Shakespeare's plays. The RSC was formally established on 20 March 1961 with the royal announcement that the Shakespeare Memorial Theatre would henceforth be known as the Royal Shakespeare Theatre and the company as the Royal Shakespeare Company. In 1962 the RSC established the Aldwych Theatre as its London base for productions transferred from Stratford to London, its stage redesigned to match the RST's apron stage. In 1982, the company took up London residence in both the Barbican Theatre and The Pit studio space in the Barbican Centre under the auspices of the City of London. The RSC was closely involved in the design of these two venues. Since 2002 the RSC has had no regular London home, concentrating its work in Stratford at the Swan Theatre and the redeveloped Royal Shakespeare Theatre (re-opened in 2010).

An important cultural movement in the British theatre that developed in the late 1950s and early 1960s was Kitchen sink realism (or kitchen sink drama), art (the term itself derives from an expressionist painting by John Bratby), novels, film, and television plays. The term angry young men was often applied members of this artistic movement. It used a style of social realism which depicts the domestic lives of the working class, to explore social issues and political issues. The drawing room plays of the post war period, typical of dramatists like Terence Rattigan and Noël Coward were challenged in the 1950s by these Angry Young Men, in plays like John Osborne's Look Back in Anger (1956). Arnold Wesker and Nell Dunn also brought social concerns to the stage.

Again in the 1950s, the absurdist play Waiting for Godot (1955) (originally En attendant Godot, 1952), by the Paris-based Irish expatriate Samuel Beckett profoundly affected British drama. The Theatre of the Absurd influenced Harold Pinter (1930–2008), (The Birthday Party, 1958), whose works are often characterised by menace or claustrophobia. Beckett also influenced Tom Stoppard (1937-) (Rosencrantz and Guildenstern are Dead,1966). Stoppard's works are however also notable for their high-spirited wit and the great range of intellectual issues which he tackles in different plays. Both Pinter and Stoppard continued to have new plays produced into the 1990s.

Beyond the Fringe was a comedy stage revue written and performed by Peter Cook, Dudley Moore, Alan Bennett, and Jonathan Miller. It played in London's West End and then on New York's Broadway in the early 1960s, and is widely regarded as seminal to the rise of satire in 1960s Britain.

The Chichester Festival Theatre was Britain's first modern thrust stage theatre. It was inspired by the Festival Theatre of the Stratford Shakespeare Festival launched by Tyrone Guthrie in the Canadian city of Stratford, Ontario. The inaugural Artistic Director of the Chichester Festival was Sir Laurence Olivier, and it was at Chichester that the first National Theatre company was formed. Chichester's productions would transfer to the National Theatre's base at the Old Vic in London.

The Theatres Act 1968 abolished the system of censorship of the stage that had existed in Great Britain since 1737. The new freedoms of the London stage were tested by Howard Brenton's The Romans in Britain, first staged at the National Theatre during 1980, and subsequently the focus of an unsuccessful private prosecution in 1982.

The height of Alan Ayckbourn's commercial success included Absurd Person Singular (1975), The Norman Conquests trilogy (1973), Bedroom Farce (1975) and Just Between Ourselves (1976), all plays that focused heavily on marriage in the British middle classes. Throughout his writing career, all but four of his plays were premièred at the Stephen Joseph Theatre in Scarborough in its three different locations. The Stephen Joseph Theatre was the first theatre in the round in Britain.

Other playwrights whose careers began later in the century are: Caryl Churchill (Top Girls, 1982), Michael Frayn (1933-) playwright and novelist, David Hare (1947- ), David Edgar (1948- ). Dennis Potter's most distinctive dramatic work was produced for television.

Translations by Brian Friel was first performed at the Guildhall, Derry, Northern Ireland, in 1980. An Irish-language version of the play has been produced. The play has also been translated into Welsh by Elan Closs Stephens. The Welsh version has visited a number of venues in Wales and was first published by Gwasg Carreg Gwalch, under its Welsh title Torri Gair ("Breaking the Word"), in 1982. It is "a play about language and only about language", but it deals with a wide range of issues, stretching from language and communication to Irish history and cultural imperialism. Friel responds strongly to both political and language questions in modern-day Northern Ireland.

In 1970, American actor and director Sam Wanamaker founded the Shakespeare Globe Trust and the International Shakespeare Globe Centre, with the objective of building a faithful recreation of Shakespeare's Globe close to its original location at Bankside, Southwark. Shakespeare's Globe opened to the public in 1997. Performances are engineered to duplicate the original environment of Shakespeare's Globe; there are no spotlights, plays are staged during daylight hours and in the evenings (with the help of interior floodlights), there are no microphones, speakers or amplification.

== Radio drama ==
During the 1950s and 1960s, many major British playwrights either effectively began their careers with the BBC, or had works adapted for radio. Most of playwright Caryl Churchill's early experiences with professional drama production were as a radio playwright and, starting in 1962 with The Ants, there were nine productions with BBC radio drama up until 1973 when her stage work began to be recognised at the Royal Court Theatre. Joe Orton's dramatic debut in 1963 was the radio play The Ruffian on the Stair, which was broadcast on 31 August 1964. Tom Stoppard's "first professional production was in the fifteen-minute Just Before Midnight programme on BBC Radio, which showcased new dramatists". John Mortimer made his radio debut as a dramatist in 1955, with his adaptation of his own novel Like Men Betrayed for the BBC Light Programme. But he made his debut as an original playwright with The Dock Brief, starring Michael Hordern as a hapless barrister, first broadcast in 1957 on BBC Radio's Third Programme, later televised with the same cast, and subsequently presented in a double bill with What Shall We Tell Caroline? at the Lyric Hammersmith in April 1958, before transferring to the Garrick Theatre. Mortimer is most famous for Rumpole of the Bailey a British television series which starred Leo McKern as Horace Rumpole, an aging London barrister who defends any and all clients. It has been spun off into a series of short stories, novels, and radio programmes.

Other notable radio dramatists included Brendan Behan and novelist Angela Carter. Novelist Susan Hill also wrote for BBC radio, from the early 1970s. Irish playwright Brendan Behan, author of The Quare Fellow (1954), was commissioned by the BBC to write a radio play The Big House (1956); prior to this he had written two plays Moving Out and A Garden Party for Irish radio.

Among the most famous works created for radio are Dylan Thomas's Under Milk Wood (1954), which was later adapted into the 1972 film starring Richard Burton and Glynis Johns, Samuel Beckett's All That Fall (1957), Harold Pinter's A Slight Ache (1959), Robert Bolt's A Man for All Seasons (1954), and Terence Rattigan's Cause Célèbre (1975), which earned starring actress Glynis Johns a Variety Club Award for Best Actress and Laurence Olivier Award nomination.

Samuel Beckett wrote a number of short radio plays in the 1950s and 1960s, and later for television. Beckett's radio play Embers was first broadcast on the BBC Third Programme on 24 June 1959, and won the RAI prize at the Prix Italia awards later that year.

== National theatres ==
From the 1840s there was a demand to commemorate serious theatre, with the "Shakespeare Committee" purchasing the playwright's birthplace for the nation demonstrating a recognition of the importance of 'serious drama'. The following year saw more pamphlets on a demand for a National Theatre from London publisher, Effingham Wilson. The situation continued, with a renewed call every decade for a National Theatre. In 1879 the residency of the Comédie-Française at the Gaiety Theatre inspired further demands, including: a structure in the capital that would present "exemplary theatre"; that would form a permanent memorial to Shakespeare; a supported company that would represent the best of British acting; and a theatre school. A London Shakespeare League was founded in 1902 to develop a Shakespeare National Theatre and – with the impending tri-centenary in 1916 of his death – in 1913 purchased land for a theatre in Bloomsbury. This work was interrupted by World War I. Finally, in 1948, the London County Council presented a site close to the Royal Festival Hall for the purpose, and a "National Theatre Act", offering financial support, was passed by Parliament in 1949. In July 1962, a board was set up to supervise construction of a National Theatre on the South Bank site and a separate board was constituted to run a National Theatre Company and lease the Old Vic theatre. The company was to remain at the Old Vic until 1976, when the new South Bank building was opened.

The theatrical landscape has since been reconfigured, moving from a single national theatre at the end of the 20th century to four as a result of the devolution of cultural policy. National theatre companies were founded in Scotland and Wales as complements to the Royal National Theatre in London: Theatr Genedlaethol Cymru (the Welsh language national theatre of Wales, founded 2003), National Theatre of Scotland (founded 2006), National Theatre Wales (the English language national theatre company of Wales, founded 2009). Theatr Genedlaethol Cymru attempts to shape a distinctive identity for drama in Welsh while also opening it up to outside linguistic and dramatic influences.

== West End theatre ==
The West End of London has a large number of theatres, particularly centred around Shaftesbury Avenue.

West End theatre is a popular term for mainstream professional theatre staged in the large theatres of London's "Theatreland". Along with New York's Broadway theatre, West End theatre is usually considered to represent the highest level of commercial theatre in the English-speaking world. Seeing a West End show is a common tourist activity in London.

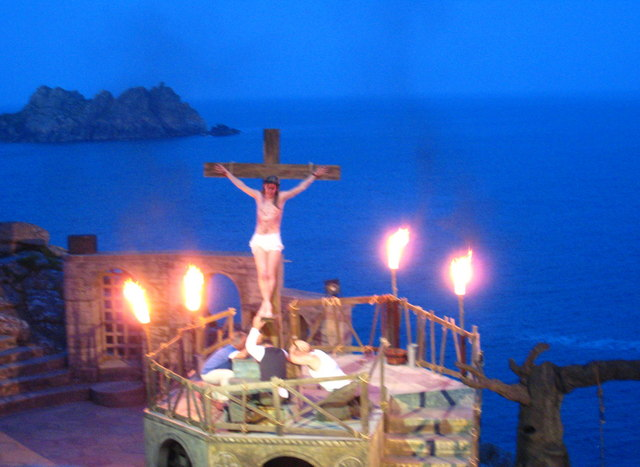
Andrew Lloyd Webber and Tim Rice's Jesus Christ Superstar in performance at the Minack Theatre, near to St Levan, Cornwall

A prolific composer of musical theatre in the 20th century, Andrew Lloyd Webber has been referred to as "the most commercially successful composer in history". His musicals have dominated the West End for a number of years and have travelled to Broadway in New York City and around the world as well as being turned into films. Lloyd Webber's musicals originally starred Elaine Paige, who with continued success has become known as the First Lady of British Musical Theatre.

== See also ==
- English drama
- History of theatre
- Theatre of Scotland
- Theatre in the United States
- Theatre of Wales
- Irish theatre
- List of theatres in the United Kingdom
- Theater in the United States
- Laurence Olivier Awards — presented annually by the Society of London Theatre to recognise excellence in professional London theatre
