= Douglas Maxwell =

British playwright

Douglas Maxwell (born in 1974) is a Scottish playwright, whose work has been performed throughout Scotland, the wider and abroad.

== Life & work ==
He was born to two teachers in Girvan on the Ayrshire south-west coast of Scotland. He has one sister. He came to fame when his play Decky Does a Bronco was performed in 2000 by the Grid Iron Theatre Company. The play won numerous awards including a Fringe First, the Stage Award for Ensemble Acting and was nominated for The Barclaycard Stage Award for Best Touring Production. Variety, a comic drama about the impact of cinema on Scotland's variety entertainers, was staged as at The Edinburgh International Festival in 2002 and was subsequently broadcast on BBC Four. Maxwell was also the subject of a BBC Two Scotland Artworks documentary in 2002. In 2009 Maxwell was awarded Theatre Centre's Brian Way Award for Best New Play for The Mothership.

== Plays ==
- Decky Does a Bronco (2000) Pub. Oberon (2001)
- Our Bad Magnet (2000) Pub. Oberon (2001)
- Variety (2002) Pub. Oberon (2002)
- Helmet (2002) Pub. Oberon (2002)
- Mancub (2005) Pub. Oberon (2005)
- If Destroyed True (2005) Pub. Oberon (2005)
- The Backpacker Blues (2005)
- Melody (2006) Pub. Oberon (2006)
- The Mother Ship (2008) Pub. Oberon (2008)
- The Miracle Man (2010)
- Too Fast (2011)
- A Respectable Widow Takes To Vulgarity (2013)
- Fever Dream: Southside (2015)
- Yer Granny (2015)
- Charlie Sonata (2015)
- Build Your Own Utopia (2020)
- Beautiful Boy (2020)
- The Assumption (2020)
- Fatbaws (2020)
- At First I Was Afraid... (I Was Petrified) (2021)
- Man's Best Friend (2022)
- Orphans (2022)
- The Sheriff of Kalamaki (2023)
- So Young (2024)
- Inexperience (2026)
