= Wee Stories Theatre =

Scottish theatre company

Wee Stories theatre company was established in 1995. The company has received nominations and awards from TMA Awards and Critics Awards for Theatre in Scotland. Wee Stories is based in Edinburgh, Scotland and tours to school halls, village halls and theatres of all scales in Scotland and the United Kingdom.

== History ==
Founded in 1995 by Creative Director Andy Cannon and General Manager Lara Bowen, the company was set up as a non-profit storytelling theatre company for children and families. Wee Stories' productions are created for audiences of all ages, describing their work as child-friendly rather than for children.

== Creative directors ==
Andy Cannon was the Creative Director of Wee Stories from 1995 - 2011. He is now an Associate Artist with the company.

Iain Johnstone was a regular collaborator of the company since 1999, writing scripts, music and lyrics, performing in and directing Wee Stories productions. Johnstone was appointed Co-Creative Director in 2005. In 2011, he was appointed as Artistic Director.

Andy Cannon and Iain Johnstone have performed, written and directed the bulk of the company's work together, and have a reputation for presenting work to intergenerational audiences.

== Productions ==
1995

- Ivan - schools tour, December.

1996

- Oops! - autumn.
- Spring and the Selfish Giant - schools tour, December.

1997

- A Duck called Ping - February and June.
- Sir Janet - autumn and spring.
- The Singing Ringing Tree - December.

1998

- Know Nothing Norman - February.
- Labyrinth - October.
- A Christmas Carol - December.

1999

- Labyrinth - August.
- The Loch Ness Affair - autumn.
- Rashiecoat - December.

2000

- Laird's New Kilt - May–July.
- Pilot Project at Museum of Scotland, October.
- Peter Pan with Shona Reppe - December.

2001

- The Tale of the Hare and the Tortoise - (Wee Stories Early Years Project) February.
- Treasure Island - spring–autumn.
- Molly Whuppie - (Wee Stories Early Years Project) December.
- Peter Pan with Shona Reppe - December.

2002

- Tae a Mouse and A' That - (National Museum of Scotland), January.
- A Wolf's Tale - (National Museum of Scotland), February.
- Treasure Island - spring and autumn.
- Wee Witches - (Wee Stories Early Years Project), May.
- A Christmas Carol - December.

2003

- Labyrinth - spring.
- Quest - spring.
- Quangle Wangle - (Wee Stories Early Years Project), spring.
- Excalibur - summer.
- Arthur, the Story of a King - autumn.
- A Christmas Carol - December.

2004

- Arthur, the Story of a King - spring.
- Treasure Island - summer.
- Tam O'Shanter - autumn.
- The Emperor's New Kilt - winter.

2005

- Treasure Island - spring.
- Labyrinth - summer.
- Arthur, the Story of a King - autumn.
- Peter Pan - winter.

2006

- Is This a Dagger? - autumn.
- Jock and the Beanstalk - winter.

2007

- Tam O'Shanter - spring.
- One Small Step - autumn.
- Jock and the Beanstalk - winter.

2008

- The Emperor's New Kilt - (a co-production with the National Theatre of Scotland), spring.
- One Giant Leap - (a co-production with the National Theatre of Scotland), autumn.
- Bad King Wenceslas - schools tour, December.

2009

- One Giant Leap - spring.
- Once Upon a Time Machine - spring.
- The Sun, the Moon and a Boy called River - autumn.
- Spring and the Selfish Giant - schools tour, December.

2010

- Treasure Island - spring.
- The Sun, the Moon and a Boy called River - spring.
- Jock and the Beanstalk - winter.
- The Selfish Giant - winter.

2011

- Is This a Dagger? The Story of Macbeth - spring.
- Arthur, the Story of a King - autumn.

2012

- One Giant Leap - spring.
- The Sun, the Moon and a Boy called River - South of Scotland tour, summer.
- A Dream on Midsummer's Night - Scotland tour, autumn.

2013

- Hickory and Dickory Dock - spring, touring with One Giant Leap.
- One Giant Leap - Edinburgh Festival Fringe as part of Made in Scotland, summer.
- Hickory and Dickory Dock/One Giant Leap - double bill tour, autumn.
- The Selfish Giant - Christmas show at the Festival Theatre Studio, winter.

== Awards ==
Awards: For The Emperor's New Kilt, a co-production with the National Theatre of Scotland, (2008)

- Critics Awards for Theatre in Scotland [CATS] 'Best Production for Children and Young People'.

For Arthur, the Story of a King (2004)

- TMA Awards for 'Best Show for Children and Young People'.
- Critics' Awards for Theatre in Scotland [CATS] for 'Best Production for Children and Young People'.

For Labyrinth (1999)

- Herald Angel Award.

Nominations: For The Emperor's New Kilt (2008)

- TMA Awards for Best Show for Children and Young People.
- Critics' Awards for Theatre in Scotland Award for Best Design: Becky Minto.
- Critics' Awards for Theatre in Scotland Award for Best Direction: Andy Cannon & Iain Johnstone.
- Critics' Awards for Theatre in Scotland Award for Best Use of Music and Sound: David Trouton
- Critics' Awards for Theatre in Scotland Award for Best Production.

For Arthur, the Story of a King (2004)

- Critics' Awards for Theatre in Scotland Award for Best Director: Andy Cannon & Iain Johnstone.
- Critics' Awards for Theatre in Scotland Award for Best Production.
