= Brian Way =

Brian Francis Way (September 12, 1923 – February 23, 2006) was a British theatre practitioner who established Theatre Centre in London, England, in 1953. The company originated the modern concept of theatre for children in an educational context.

Brian Way was born in Sussex, England, in 1923. He was the prime mover in a group of lecturers and teachers, who were in 1946 considering the relationship between theatre and teaching. People such as Peter Slade, Warren Jenkins and Brian English had a considerable influence on his thinking and he edited Slade's book Child Drama. They worked together at Bristol Old Vic, where he met his first wife, Kathleen. After his marriage to her in 1946, they came to London and he continued to make a rather tenuous living from lecturing and teaching until the beginning of the fifties, when he provided a centre for unemployed actors, on occasional days, at a hall in Loudoun Road, St John's Wood.

There he produced plays in the round including Philoctetes and Pinocchio, which he wrote with Warren Jenkins and an abbreviated version of The Man Born to Be King by Dorothy L. Sayers. Sayers herself saw this production and was so impressed she donated £200 to him so that he could establish Theatre Centre as a company, whose board of management she joined. Brian, who had co-founded the West Country Children's Theatre Company after the war, again turned his attention to educational children's theatre. He believed that plays in this context ought to be performed in the round, for specific age groups limited in number, with professional actors capable of interacting with the children. He believed the plays should be entertaining, as well as informative. That philosophy has remained the purpose of Theatre Centre ever since. It was not, however, until 1965 that theatre in education became an accepted part of the educational system and of professional theatre.

Brian stated his beliefs in two seminal books, Development Through Drama and Audience Participation, which have been translated into many languages. He retired from Theatre Centre in 1977 and he has to his credit more than 50 plays. He became a visiting professor in a number of distinguished universities, moving permanently to Canada in 1983 and living in Toronto with his second wife Perri. He is survived by her, by Kathleen and by his three children David, Peter and Amanda. He was a seminal figure in the development of educational theatre. He died in Toronto in 2006.

The Arts Council of Great Britain established The Children's Award to celebrate the accomplishments and raise the profile of theatre for young people and most especially playwrights who work in this field. Since 2006 Theatre Centre has administered this Award, which has been renamed 'The Brian Way Award' in honour and recognition of this pioneering man of extraordinary vision.
