= Theatre Centre =

- Formation: 1953
- Type: Theatre group
- Purpose: Touring, Theatre for Young People, New Writing
- Location: UK
- Notable members: Brian Way, Ron Cook, Lisa Evans, Noël Greig, Mike Kenny, Bryony Lavery, Diane Louise Jordan, Brendan Murray, Adrian Noble, Philip Osment, Pam St. Clement, Juliet Stevenson, Manjinder Virk, Roy Williams, Benjamin Zephaniah
- Website: theatre-centre.co.uk

Theatre Centre is a UK-based theatre company touring new plays for young audiences. It was Founded in 1953 by Brian Way and Margaret Faulkes.

== History ==
Brian Way and Margaret Faulkes founded Theatre Centre in 1953. When they produced a shortened version of Dorothy L. Sayers' The Man Born to Be King, the production inspired Sayers to donate £200 to help establish the company.

Many of Theatre Centre's early plays were written by Brian Way himself, who believed that plays should be written for a specific age group, and audiences are best kept small, for the best performances. Theatre Centre productions were presented informally, in the round, on the floor of school halls.

The company's "initial aim was to provide a place where unemployed actors might meet and practise their art", according to Laurence Harbottle (of Harbottle & Lewis) in 2006. "What it became was the launch pad for educational theatre in schools – and what Brian became, in the next half century, was the seminal influence on that movement, worldwide".

The Theatre Centre has developed plays by many writers, including Lisa Evans, Noël Greig, Mike Kenny, Bryony Lavery, Leo Butler, Brendan Murray, Philip Osment, Manjinder Virk, Roy Williams and Benjamin Zephaniah.

== Description ==
Today, Theatre Centre shows tour to schools and venues around the country and the company has a focus on writers creating work for young audiences aged 4 to 18.

It is a member of Theatre for Young Audiences UK (TYA-UK), a network for makers and promoters of professional theatre for young audiences.

Theatre Centre is a registered charity and is an Arts Council England National Portfolio Organisation.

== Awards ==
Theatre Centre administrates two prizes for writers, the Brian Way Award for Best New Play (formerly The Children's Award, established by Arts Council England) and the Adrienne Benham Award. The Brian Way Award is presented annually to the writer of a play for young people which has been professionally produced, and the Adrienne Benham Award to a writer who wishes to write a play for young people but who hasn't previously done so. Winners of the Brian Way Award for Best New Play:

- 2012: Evan Placey for Holloway Jones (Synergy Theatre Company)
- 2011: Keith Saha for Ghost Boy (20 Stories High)
- 2010: Laurence Wilson for Blackberry Trout Face (20 Stories High)
- 2009: Douglas Maxwell for The Mothership (Birmingham Repertory Theatre)
- 2008: David Greig for Yellow Moon (TAG)
- 2008: Fin Kennedy (runner-up) for Locked In (Half Moon Theatre Company)
- 2007: Tim Crouch for Shopping for Shoes (National Theatre Education Department)
- 2007: Deborah Gearing (runner-up) for Burn (Shell Connections)
- 2006: Neil Duffield for The Lost Warrior (Dukes Theatre, Lancaster)
- 2005: Abi Bown for Hey There Boy with the Bebop (Polka Theatre)
- 2004: Charles Way for Red Red Shoes (Unicorn Theatre)
- 2003: Phil Porter for Smashed Eggs (Pentabus Theatre)
- 2002: Brendan Murray for Eliza's House (Royal Exchange)
- 2001: Mike Kenny for Stepping Stones (Interplay)

Winners of the Adrienne Benham Award:

- 2012: Kenneth Emson
- 2011: Marcelo Dos Santos
- 2010: Paula B. Stanic
- 2009: Steven Bloomer

== Sources ==
- Modern British Playwriting: The 1980s: Voices, Documents, New Interpretations, Jane Milling, Methuen Drama, 2012. ISBN 1408129590.
- Working With Theatre in Schools, Clive Webster, Pitman Publishing, 1975. ISBN 027300042X.
- Advice for the Young at Heart, Roy Williams, Methuen Drama, 2013. ISBN 9781472528032.
