= London theatre closure 1642 =

Ban on theatrics by the Long Parliament (1642 to 1660)

On 2 September 1642, just after the First English Civil War had begun, the Long Parliament ordered the closure of all London theatres. The order cited the current "times of humiliation" and "sad and pious solemnity", a zeitgeist incompatible with "public stage-plays", which were representative of "lascivious Mirth and Levity". The closure was the culmination of the rising anti-theatrical sentiment among Puritans, and along with William Prynne's Histriomastix (1633), its text was the most notorious attack on theatre in English history.

On 24 January 1643, the actors responded to the suppression of the theatre by writing a pamphlet to Parliament titled "The Actors remonstrance or complaint for the silencing of their profession, and banishment from their severall play-houses", in which they also state, "wee have purged our stages of all obscene and scurrilous jests".

It was unclear to contemporary audiences whether the intent of the Act was a permanent ban or a temporary response to political tensions. The directive did not demand a permanent end to theatre, but rather demanded their absence "while these sad causes and set times of humiliation do continue". Another Act of 11 February 1648, at the beginning of the Second Civil War, was "a much more severe decree"; it provided for the treatment of actors as rogues, the demolition of theatre seating, and fines for spectators.

In 1660, after the English Restoration brought King Charles II to effective power in England, the theatrical ban was lifted. Under a new licensing system, two London theatres with royal patents were opened: the King's Company and the Duke's Company. This interregnum substantially changed the practice of theatre in Britain; post-1660 plays bore a noticeably different character to their pre-1642 counterparts. For example, actresses were permitted on stage, which was considered scandalous in the previous era.

Details of orders:

- 2 September 1642: Order for Stage-plays to cease
- 22 October 1647: An Ordinance for the Lord Major and City of London, and the Justices of Peace to suppress Stage-playes and Interludes
- 11 February 1648: An Ordinance for the utter suppression and abolishing of all Stage-Plays and Interludes, within the Penalties to be inflicted on the Actors and Spectators therein expressed

== See also ==
- King's Men § Aftermath for the history of one company affected by the prohibition
- William Robbins (actor) an actor who lost his living, and fought and died for the Royalist cause.
- Antitheatricality § 16th and 17th century
- The Cambridge History of British Theatre from Roman colony origins through the twentieth century.
