= Rob Evans (writer) =

British playwright (born 1978)

Robert Alan Evans
- Born: 14 March 1978 (age 48); Oxford, England
- Education: University of Edinburgh
- Occupations: Playwright, director
- Notable work: The Ballad of Pondlife McGurk; Mikey and Addie
- Website: Official website

Robert Alan Evans (born 14 March 1978) is a British playwright and theatre director who primarily writes for children and young people. He is the winner of two CATS awards (one for The Voice Thief) and a Prix D'Orpheon (for The Ballad of Pondlife McGurk).

== Early life and education ==
Evans was born in 1978 in Oxford, England and grew up in Glasgow, Newcastle, Cardiff and Penarth. He studied for an MA in English Literature and History at the University of Edinburgh before moving to Glasgow in 2000, where he began writing and directing professionally for theatre.

== Career ==
After working as Assistant Director at the Traverse Theatre in Edinburgh on Gagarin Way by Gregory Burke and Iron by Rona Munro, Evans was sent to the World Interplay conference in Townsville, Australia in 2003 by the Traverse. His first play, A Girl in a Car with a Man, was picked up by playwright Simon Stephens. It was produced at the Royal Court Theatre in 2004 and actor Andrew Scott received the 2005 Laurence Olivier Award for Outstanding Achievement in an Affiliate Theatre for his portrayal of Alex. It was performed in German at the Munich Kammerspiele in November 2005. Evans developed Aruba (2005) and Fish Story (2007) with the People Can Run theatre company. Aruba had a successful run at the Edinburgh Fringe Festival, then toured the UK and off Broadway.

His work for younger audiences includes Pinocchio (2006); Kappa (2007); an adaptation of Ben Rice's short story Pobby and Dingan (2010); The Ballad of Pondlife McGurk (2010); and an adaptation of Barry Hines’ A Kestrel for a Knave (2011). Pondlife was also performed in Stockholm as Neandertalare (2011) and in Subiaco (2014). Other works include Peter Pan (2012) at the Sherman Cymru and Mikey and Addie (2012) for the Cultural Olympiad. He co-created Tiger and Tiger Tale (2013) and Little Red (2015) with Natasha Gilmore and the dance theatre company Barrowland Ballet. In 2024, his adaptation of Neil Gaiman's Odd and the Frost Giants was performed at the Unicorn Theatre.

Evans' awards include two CATS awards (one for The Voice Thief) and a Prix D'Orpheon (for The Ballad of Pondlife McGurk). In 2010, his play Pobby and Dingan won the TMA Award for Best Show for Children and Young People. He was shortlisted for the Brian Way Award for The Ballad of Pondlife McGurk in 2011. His work in the UK has been published by Faber and Faber and Samuel French and in France by L'Arche. BBC Radio 4 broadcast his abridgment of A Patriot for Us by John Heilpern in 2006 and his radio play The Cracks in 2010.

== Personal life ==
Evans is gay.

== Selected productions ==
Year	Title	Premiere venue	Writer	Director	Notes	Ref(s)
1999	Whatever! The Musical!	Bedlam Theatre/Edinburgh Fringe Festival	Yes			
2001	Dead Pan	The Arches	Yes			
2001	Ghost Shirt	Tron Theatre	Yes			
2002	New Town	The Arches	Yes			
2004	A Girl in a Car with a Man	Royal Court Theatre	Yes		Andrew Scott received the 2005 Olivier Award for his portrayal of Alex.	
2005	Aruba	Edinburgh Fringe Festival	Yes	Yes	With People Can Run Theatre company	
2006	Pinocchio	Northampton Theatre Royal	Yes	Yes		
2007	Fish Story	Pleasance Edinburgh	Yes	Yes	With People Can Run Theatre company	
2007	Kappa	Catherine Wheels Theatre Company	Yes			
2008	Rudolf	MacRobert Arts Centre			Co-created with Andy Manley	
2009	Naked Neighbour (Twitching Blind)	Tramway		Yes		
2010	Pobby and Dingan	Catherine Wheels Theatre Company	Yes		Adapted from the Ben Rice book	
2010	The Ballad of Pondlife McGurk	Catherine Wheels Theatre Company	Yes		Winner of a Prix D'Orpheon	
2010	Mr Snow	MacRobert Arts Centre/West Yorkshire Playhouse	Yes	Yes		
2011	Kes	West Yorkshire Playhouse	Yes		Adapted from A Kestrel for a Knave by Barry Hines; performance with the Catherine Wheels Theatre Company	
2011	Caged	Traverse Theatre	Yes		With the Catherine Wheels Theatre Company; retelling of Beauty and the Beast	
2012	Peter Pan	Sherman Cymru	Yes			
2012	Mikey and Addie	London 2012 Festival	Yes			
2013	Sleeping Beauties	Sherman Cymru	Yes		Retelling of Sleeping Beauty	
2013	Tiger & Tiger Tale	Tramway			Co-created with Natasha Gilmore and Barrowland Ballet	
2013	Ignition	National Theatre of Scotland	Yes			
2014	The Voice Thief	Summerhall			With Catherine Wheels Theatre Company	
2014	The Night Before Christmas	The Arches	Yes		With Macrobert Arts Centre	
2015	Little Red	Tramway	Yes	Yes	Co-created with Natasha Gilmore and Barrowland Ballet	
2017	Crumble's Search for Christmas	West Yorkshire Playhouse	Yes	Yes		
2018	The Woods	Royal Court Theatre	Yes			
2019	The Tale of Little Bevan	Courtyard, Hereford	Yes		Commissioned by Pentabus	
2019	The Dig	Backstage Theatre (Longford)		Yes		
2019	The River and the Mountain	LAMDA	Yes			
2021	Christmas Dinner	Royal Lyceum Theatre	Yes			
2022	Death Drop: Back in the Habit	King's Theatre, Glasgow	Yes			
2023	Too Close to the Sun	Traverse Theatre	Yes	Yes	Co-created with Natasha Gilmore and Barrowland Ballet; based on Icarus	
2024	Odd and the Frost Giants	Unicorn Theatre	Yes		Based on the book by Neil Gaiman	
