= Darren Ockert =

- Ockert in 2008
- Born: Lincoln, England
- Occupations: Singer-songwriter; producer; businessman
- Musical career
- Genres: Pop; rock; dance; electronic
- Years active: 2005–present
- Labels: Poptastik Records; Shark Meat Records
- Website: darrenockert.com

Darren Ockert is an English pop singer, songwriter and record producer born in Lincoln, Lincolnshire, England, currently residing in Miami, Florida, United States.

== Biography ==
=== Early life and career ===
Darren Ockert was born in Lincoln, England. After graduating from The London School of Musical Theatre he established a theatre production company called Darren Ockert Productions in London at the Young Vic Theatre. In 1999, Ockert became one of the youngest producers to win a prestigious TMA Award for his co-production with the Young Vic Theatre Company of Arabian Nights. On 29 September 2000, this production of Arabian Nights played a limited run Off-Broadway on 42nd Street in New York City at the New Victory Theater.

=== 1998–1999 theatre productions ===
- National UK tour of The Canterville Ghost which starred the 1968 Academy Award-nominated actor Ron Moody
- European premiere production of Scooter Thomas Makes It to the Top of the World by the American playwright Peter Parnell
- Three Lost Souls at the Battersea Arts Centre and King's Head Theatre in London
- The Little Match Girl at The Bull Theatre in London
- Late at The Young Vic Studio Theatre in London

== Music ==
In 2005, Ockert released his first album, Anything Is Possible. In 2006, he was nominated for an OutMusic Award in the category "Outstanding New Recording – Debut Male" and was subsequently featured in interviews in the June 2006 Pride issues of the international publications Genre and Instinct.

== Other projects ==
Ockert has produced the artist Sami Raad and collaborated with the pop-singer and songwriter Nathan Leigh Jones.

== Discography ==
=== Albums ===
- Anything Is Possible (2005)
- Short Story Long (2013)

=== EPs ===
- The Limit - Remixes (2006)
- Out of the Rain - Remixes (2007)
- Celebrity du Jour - The Remixes (2009)
- The Rain From London (2012)

=== Singles ===
From Anything Is Possible:

- "The Limit" (2006)
- "Celebrity du Jour" (2009)

From Short Story Long:

- "You Don't Know Me" (2013)

== Awards and nominations ==
=== OutMusic Awards ===
OutMusic is an organisation that started with the objective to raise awareness about openly gay and lesbian artists and their music. In 2001, the organisation introduced the first annual OutMusic Awards to increase the popularity of LGBT musicians. Ockert has received one nomination.

Year	Nominated work	Award	Result	Ref.
2006	Anything Is Possible	Outstanding Debut Recording: Male	Nominated	

=== RightOutTV Music & Video Awards ===
Year	Nominated work	Award	Result	Ref.
2012	Celebrity du Jour	Best Video So Far	Nominated	
2012	"The Rain From London"	Best Pop / Rock / Adult Contemporary Song	Nominated	
2012	"This Modern Life (1984)"	Best Electronic Song	Won	
2012	"The Rain From London"	Song of the Year	Nominated	
2012	Darren Ockert	Fan Fave Vote	Nominated	

=== Film awards ===
In 2012, the director Hector M. Sanchez Jr. started filming a mini-documentary about Ockert during the recording of the album Short Story Long. The documentary was debuted at the Enzian FilmSlam Film Festival on 17 February 2013 and won the top honour of Best Short Film.

Year	Nominated work	Award	Result	Ref.
2013	Darren Ockert:A Mini Documentary	Best Short Film	Won	

=== UK Songwriting Contest ===
The UK Songwriting Contest is an international contest that invites entries from all parts of the world. Ockert has received one finalist and three semi-finalist awards.

Year	Song title	Category	Result	Ref.
2012	"Force of Gravity"	Adult Contemporary	Finalist	
2012	"I've Moved On"	Adult Contemporary	Semi-finalist	
2012	"This Modern Life" (1984)"	Pop	Semi-finalist	
2012	"Celebrity du Jour"	Pop	Semi-finalist	

=== TMA Awards ===
The TMA Awards, established in 1991, are presented annually by the Theatrical Management Association in recognition of creative excellence and outstanding work in United Kingdom theatres. In 2011, the ceremony was renamed the Theatre Awards UK. Ockert has won one award.

Year	Nominated work	Award	Result	Ref.
1999	Arabian Nights	The Equity Best Show For Children And Young People	Won	
