= White (play) =

- Original language: English
- Written by: Andy Manley and Ian Cameron
- Characters: Cotton and Wrinkle
- Genre: Drama, Theatre for Early Years

Premiere
- Date: 5 August 2010
- Place: Scottish Book Trust Edinburgh, Scotland
- Official website

White is a play in one act created by Andy Manley, and staged by Catherine Wheels Theatre Company from Scotland. It is designed for audiences aged 2 to 4 years. The play has been compared to Waiting for Godot and received critical acclaim.

The original production was directed by Gill Robertson, devised by Andy Manley and Ian Cameron, with design by Shona Reppe and music by Danny Krass. It has toured around Scotland, featuring at the Traverse Theatre, across France and Belgium, and international touring includes the United States, Australia, New Zealand, Taiwan and Mexico.

The production premiered at the 2010 Edinburgh Fringe Festival and has won multiple awards including a Scotsman Fringe First 2010, a 2010 Herald Angel, a 2010 Total Theatre Award for Physical/Visual Theatre, Best Children's Production at the 2011 Theatre Awards UK and three 2010 Critics Awards for Theatre in Scotland: Best Design, Best Technical Presentation and Best Production for Children and Young People. Internationally it has been nominated for both a Drama Desk Award (USA) and a Helpmann Award (Australia). On 18 November 2015, Catherine Wheels celebrated the 1000th performance of their original Scottish production as part of a run at the New Victory Theater in New York.

White has been translated into several languages, including French, Swedish, Welsh (staged as Gwyn by Cwmni’r Frân Wen), Norwegian (Hvit by Barneteatret Vårt) and Icelandic (Hvítt, directed by Gunnar Helgasson and performed by Virginia Gillard and María Pálsdóttir).

== Plot overview ==
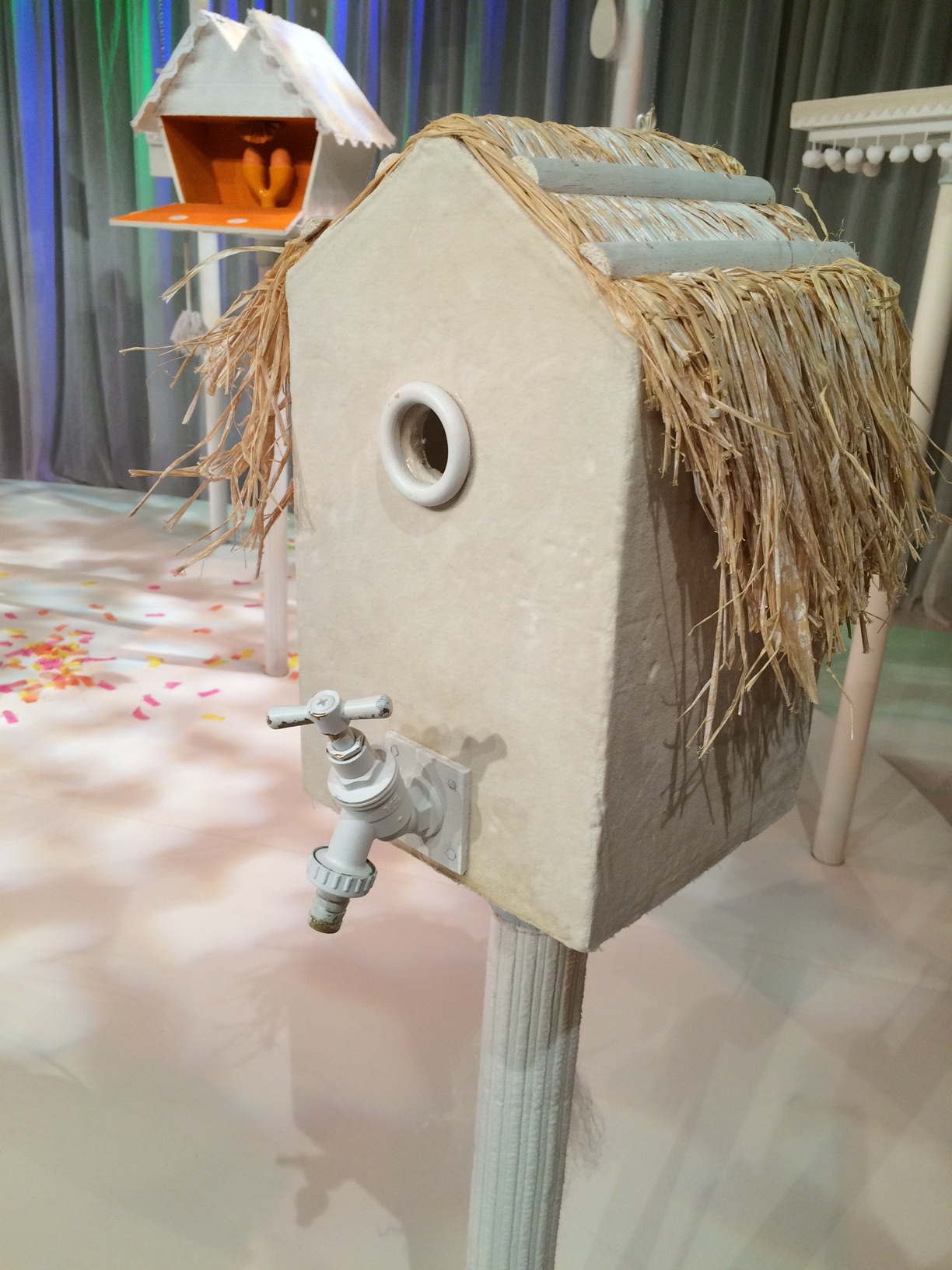
Set from White, 2010. Design by Shona Reppe.

Cotton and Wrinkle live in a completely white world, where they care for eggs which fall from the sky, placing them in specially designed birdhouses. Colour is banned, and whenever anything coloured is found, it must be placed in a large bin. Their lives are happy and uncomplicated until one day, a Red Egg falls. Cotton wants to care for the egg, but Wrinkle declares that it must go in the bin. That night, Cotton creeps out of the tent he shares with Wrinkle, and rescues the Red Egg, hiding it inside an empty birdhouse. The next morning, he is horrified to find that objects are beginning to change colour. He tries to hide the objects from Wrinkle, but eventually he is forced to admit what he has done. Wrinkle forgives him, and admits that he secretly loves colour too. They open up the birdhouses to discover that all the eggs have changed from white to pink, red, blue, green, yellow and purple, and together, they celebrate the arrival of colour into their lives.

== Mobile app ==
White was adapted into a mobile app in 2014 by Scottish app developers Hippotrix. Manley and Cameron provided voice parts for the app, and Reppe's set was photographed and animated via chroma key to create digital assets.
