= Theatre for Young Audiences =

Type of performing arts aimed at children

Theatre for Young Audiences (TYA), also youth theatre, theatre for children, and children's theatre is a branch of theatre arts that encompasses all forms of theatre that are attended by or created for younger audiences. It blankets many different forms of theatre methods and expressions, including plays, dance, music, puppetry, circus, physical theatre, and many others. It is globally practiced, takes many forms, both traditional and non-traditional, and explores a wide variety of themes ranging from fairy tales to parental abuse.

Originating in the 20th century, TYA takes on many functions in different settings and places around the world. In the US, for instance, it is often entertainment-centered, although its roots lie in education. Many writers and production companies have started catering specifically to TYA audiences, causing a continuous increase in theatrical material for children. In the present day, TYA production companies or groups can be found in most regions of the US and around the world.

== History ==
Theatre performed by or for children dates back hundreds of years. The first mention is seen in a 1784 entry in Madame de Genlis’ Memoirs, in which she describes a performance by her two daughters to the Duke of Chartres. TYA became its own branch of theatre in the 20th century, first appearing in Moscow, when Russian actress Natalia Satz founded the Moscow Theatre for Children in 1918. In its early stages, the Moscow Theatre for Children viewed its goal as representing childhood needs, separating the struggles of childhood from those of adult life. Similar TYA groups were established in England, the US, France, and Czechoslovakia between World War I and World War II.

== TYA in the United States ==
Education was the main purpose of TYA when it first arrived in the US. In 1903, Alice Minnie Herts founded The Children’s Educational Theatre, which was the first US company to produce theatrical work both with and for children. Although it did not last long, The Children’s Educational Theatre inspired both the birth of other companies around the country, as well as continuous growth in the writing and production of plays for younger audiences. The Drama League of America was another big influence in TYA within the US: children’s leagues were established in cities across the country, and material for younger audiences was both presented at these establishments and distributed to any interested groups. The Drama League was responsible for changing theatre for children from its originally purely educational intent into the broader Theatre for Young Audiences known today. Once the TYA movement started to gain traction, many different companies and playwrights chose to partake in this new branch of theatre. Some include early TYA playwright Constance Mackay, the Chicago company The Junior League, New York producer Clare Tree Major, The Children’s Theatre of Evanston, and many others. Today, TYA continues to thrive, with an increasing number of playwrights, performers, producers, and companies taking part in it.

=== Types of theatre for young audiences ===
Most TYA productions in the US are plays, with a fast-growing number of musicals taking second place. However, most performing arts forms have been adapted and incorporated into Theatre for Young Audiences, including physical theatre, operas, puppetry, dance, street performance, and many others. Some companies specifically cater to non-traditional theatre forms, such as the MainStreet Theatre Company and the Center for Puppetry Arts, Atlanta. Several major companies performing Theatre for Young Audiences exist across the US, including but not limited to Imagination Stage, Minneapolis Children's Theatre Company, Seattle Children's Theatre, Lexington Children’s Theatre, Adventure State Chicago, and Boston Children's Theatre, all producing work specifically for younger audiences throughout the year, offering performances both of new work and TYA classics.

=== Techniques and themes ===
Most Theatre for Young Audiences plays are written by adult playwrights, although occasional projects are led and constructed by the younger audiences themselves. Different schools of thought within TYA argue whether or not younger characters should be portrayed by children or by adult actors. At the present, most TYA productions in children’s companies around the country count on casts of professional adult actors to portray all roles. For instance, the Arvada Center for the Arts and Humanities’s 2016 production of an adaptation of the novel Junie B. Jones was produced with adult actors, including Melissa Morris, Katie Jackson, and Rachelle Wood, portraying characters who are around the age of 12. A number children’s companies in the US have designated programs, in which the children engage with workshops and experimental rehearsals in order to create a TYA production with child actors. Those are rarely, however, part of the companies’ main stage season. Many Theatre for Young Audiences productions still revolve around traditional child-friendly topics, such as fairy tales and magical quests. A number of theatre companies, such as Seattle Children's Theatre, Imagination Stage, and the Minneapolis Children's Theatre Company, have been working to create and produce plays and musicals for young audiences that are more intelligent and diverse.

== See also ==
- ASSITEJ
- Theatre for Early Years
- Young Spectator's Theatre
