= Magnet Theatre =

Independent physical theatre company based in Cape Town, South Africa

Coordinates: 33.934838°S 18.467998°E

- Company type: PBO with NPO status
- Genre: physical theatre, youth development
- Founded: 1987; 39 years ago in Cape Town, South Africa
- Founders: Mark Fleishman, Jennie Reznek
- Headquarters: Observatory, Cape Town, South Africa
- Key people: Mark Fleishman, Jennie Reznek, Mandla Mbothwe, Neo Muyanga, Craig Leo
- Website: magnettheatre.co.za

Magnet Theatre is an independent physical theatre company based in Cape Town, South Africa. It was formed in 1987 by Mark Fleishman and Jennie Reznek who have since been the company's artistic directors. Besides creating original theatre productions, Magnet Theatre is actively engaged in youth development work in the Cape Town area as well as in the Cederberg Municipality.

== History ==
Magnet Theatre was founded in 1987 to produce Cheap Flights (director: Roz Monat), starring Reznek. It re-emerged in 1991 to produce The Show's Not over 'Til the Fat Lady Sings (director: Mark Fleishman), again starring Reznek. The show toured nationally and internationally for two and a half years.

In 1994, Magnet Theatre returned to South Africa. For the next few years, the company focused mainly on its professional theatre productions. These included eight collaborations with Cape Town-based Jazzart Dance Theatre between 1994 and 2007 (including Medea, Rain in a Dead Man's Footprints, and Cargo); stage adaptations of Herman Melville's Moby Dick (1994) and Mia Couto's Voices Made Night (2000/01); two performance pieces with Jennie Reznek (1997/2002); and four outdoor productions between 1998 and 2011.

In 1998, Magnet Theatre established the Magnet Theatre Educational Trust dedicating itself to training and developing skills for impoverished and marginalised youth.

In 2001, Magnet Theatre initiated several youth development projects in addition to its theatre and performance productions. These include the Clanwilliam Arts Project (2001-2018); the Community Groups Intervention in Khayelitsha (2002-2007); the Community Arts Development in Clanwilliam (since 2007, which grew out of the Clanwilliam Arts Project); the Culture Gangs Project (since 2011); and the Farm Schools Project (since 2014).

In 2006, Magnet Theatre produced Every Year, Every Day, I Am Walking (director: Mark Fleishman) for the African Festival of Youth and Children's Theatre. The piece about refugees in Africa subsequently toured five continents from 2007-2014 and was published in 2011. It was part of a focus on migration which included works in isiXhosa and Afrikaans: ingcwaba lendoda lise cankwe ndlela (2009) and Inxeba Lomphilisi (2010), both directed by Mandla Mbothwe, and Die Vreemdeling (director: Mark Fleishman).

In 2008, Magnet Theatre initiated a two-year Fulltime Training and Job Creation Programme. Since then, 58 trainees from townships in and around Cape Town have participated in the programme. As part of their training, each group of trainees has created several theatre productions. Among these are pieces in isiXhosa as well as a collaboration with the Cape Town Opera and young singers from the Cape Town Opera Studio (Heart of Redness, 2013).

In 2013, Magnet Theatre initiated a creative focus on Early Years performance and training, developing performances for under seven-year-olds. Their first piece, TREE/BOOM/UMTHI (director: Jennie Reznek) toured the Cape Town townships, Italy, Germany, the UK, and the US. Since then Magnet Theatre has produced five new Early Years works that have been performed in crèches and aftercare centres in Cape Town, the Cederberg Municipality, and Okiep. One of the pieces, SCOOP: kitchen play for carers and babes (director: Koleka Putuma), was the first ever South African work for mothers/fathers and babies under the age of 12 months.

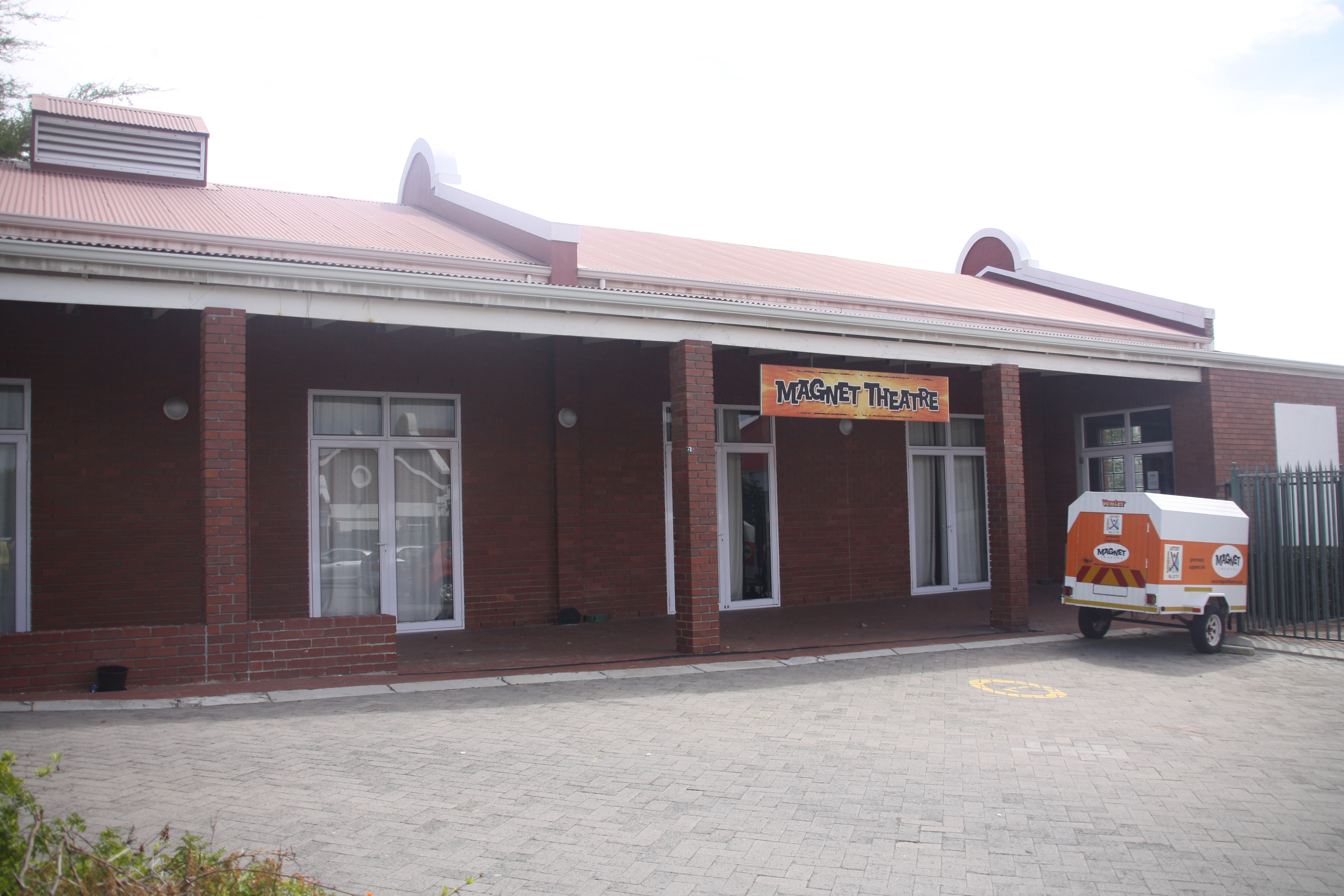
The Magnet Theatre building in Observatory, Cape Town

== Facilities ==
In 2010, Magnet Theatre moved to its current (2018) location in Observatory, Cape Town. The building that the company resides in is Unit 1 of The Old Match Factory. It contains a 9.5 x 11.5 m stage, an auditorium of 150 seats, and the Magnet Theatre office.

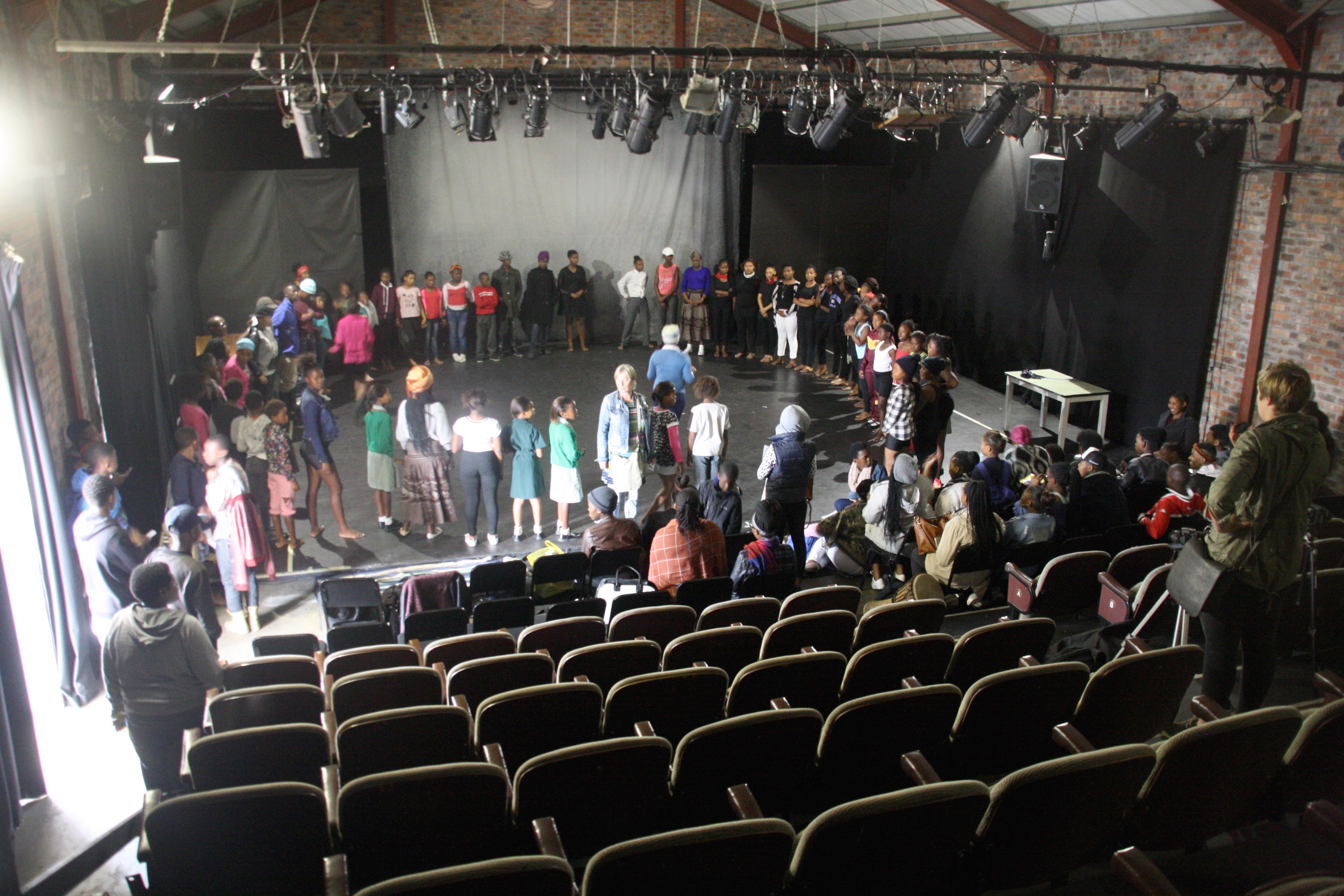
The Magnet Theatre stage and auditorium during the Culture Gangs showcase 2016

== Productions and projects ==
=== Productions ===
Since 1987, Magnet Theatre has produced more than 30 original works.

Magnet Theatre has repeatedly collaborated with other South African and international performing arts companies, including Jazzart Dance Theatre, Baxter Theatre, Cape Town Opera (all Cape Town), Southern Edge Arts (Australia), and Théâtre Spirale (Switzerland). Magnet Theatre also has a long history of collaborating with the University of Cape Town Drama School.

Magnet Theatre productions prioritise the language of the body as the primary source of meaning in theatre. When it comes to spoken language, they often feature a number of different languages, including English, isiXhosa, and Afrikaans.

=== Projects ===
Past projects

- From 2001-2008, Magnet Theatre ran a Community Groups Intervention, mentoring eight youth drama groups from Khayelitsha.
- From 2001-2018, Magnet Theatre ran the Clanwilliam Arts Project. The annual arts festival in Clanwilliam was a "project co-ordinated by Magnet Theatre and includes student facilitators from UCT Drama School, Michaelis School of Art, UCT Music School, ComNet and other independent practitioners who all use the project as a site for community arts training".
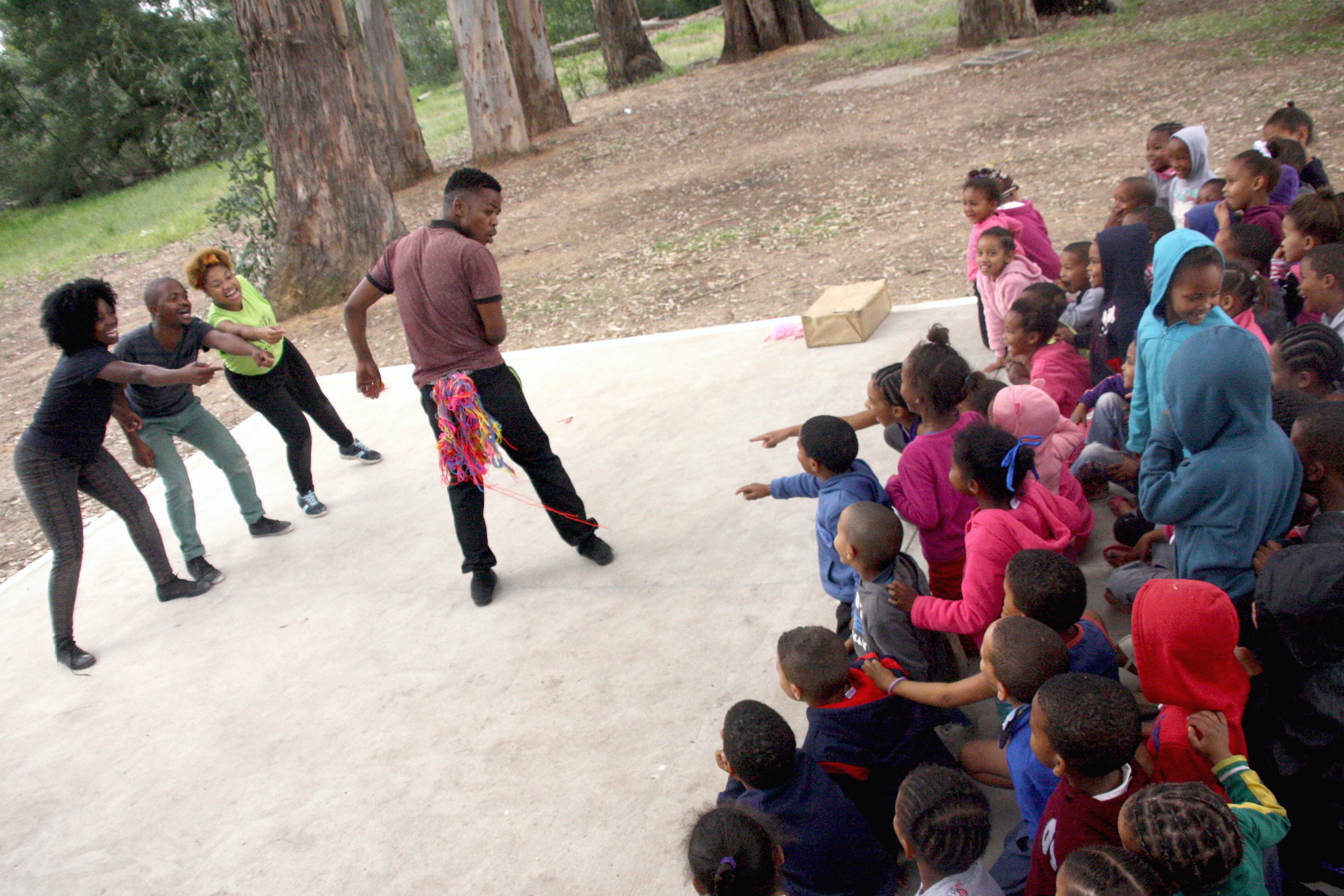
  The Magnet Theatre Early Years production AHA!, performed by Magnet Theatre trainees for children during the Clanwilliam Arts Project 2016
- From 2002-2007, Magnet Theatre ran annual Director's Workshops.
- In 2006, Magnet Theatre participated in the Common Plants research project, initiated by York University (Toronto, Canada).

Current projects

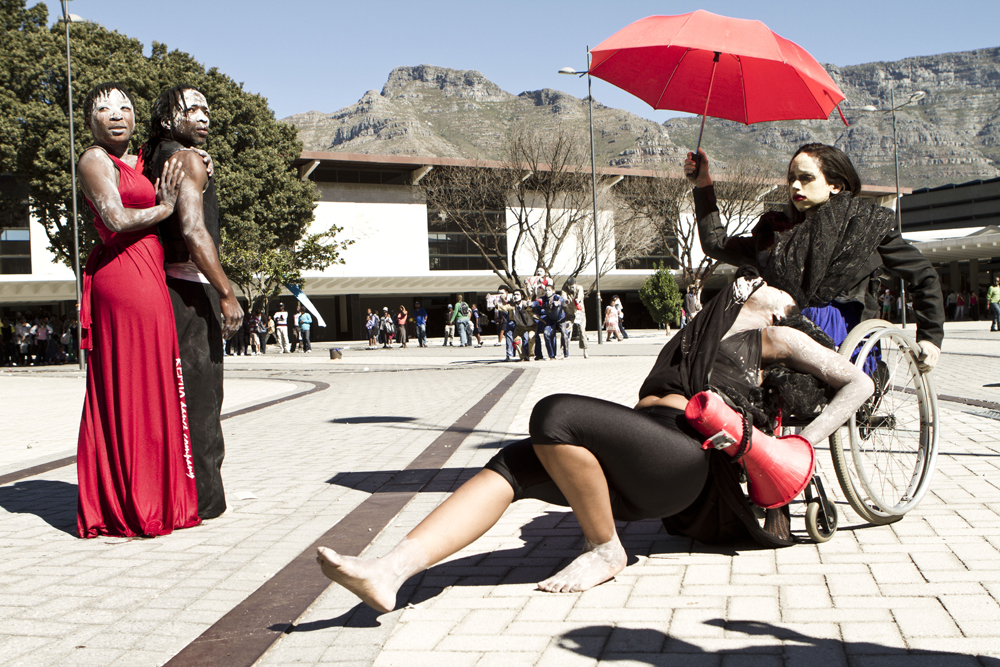
Infecting the City (Cape Town, 2012)

- Community Arts Development, Cederberg Municipality:
  - Since 2009, Magnet Theatre has had a fieldworker in the Cederberg area developing youth drama groups.
  - Since 2014, Magnet Theatre has been running a Farm School Project at a number of farm schools in the Cederberg area.
- Community Arts Development, Cape Town townships:
  - Since 2011, Magnet Theatre's Culture Gangs Project has been supporting existing drama groups in the Cape Town townships. The project aims to create "gangs of youth who are committed to culture and not to crime".

- Since 2008, Magnet Theatre has been running a two-year Fulltime Training and Job Creation Programme in physical theatre. The programme is intended to work as a bridge from under-resourced township communities to tertiary institutions of education and employment in the theatre profession as a whole.
- Since 2013, Magnet Theatre has been engaged with an Early Years Project, creating new performance pieces for audiences between the ages of 0 and 7 years.
- Since 2014, Magnet Theatre has been offering internships as part of the Expanded Public Works Programme and, since 2016, to young theatre makers.

== Awards (selection) ==
Over the years, Magnet Theatre has won numerous awards for its productions, among them the 1995 FNB Vita Award for Best Production of a New South African Work for Medea (directors: Mark Fleishman, Jennie Reznek) and the 2014 Dassie Award for Best Children's Production for TREE/BOOM/UMTHI.

Jennie Reznek has won several awards for her performances in Magnet Theatre productions, among them the 1987 Dalro Award for Best Actress for Cheap Flights and the 2009 Best Actress ABSA Aardklop National Arts Festival award (jointly with Faniswa Yisa) for Every Year, Every Day, I Am Walking.

Other awards Magnet Theatre has won include:

- 2010: Fleur du Cap Award for Innovation
- 2013: Cultural Award from the Department of Culture Affairs and Sport of the Western Cape Government
- 2014: (nominated) ASSITEJ International Award for Artistic Excellence in Theatre for Children and Youth; received a 4th Honorable Mention

== Publications ==
Magnet Theatre has been the subject of a large number of publications and has contributed to the publishing of two books:

- The Magnet Theatre 'Migration' Plays. Compiled by Jennie Reznek, Mark Fleishman, Faniswa Yisa and Frances Marek. Cape Town, 2012.
- Magnet Theatre: Three Decades of Making Space. Edited by Megan Lewis & Anton Krueger. Bristol/UK, Chicago/USA, Pretoria/SA, 2015.
