= Joe Hill-Gibbins =

British theatre and opera director

Joseph Hill-Gibbins is a British theatre and opera director.

== Background ==
Hill-Gibbins was born and raised in Surrey. He attended a local comprehensive, George Abbot School, and later read drama at Manchester University.

== Career ==
Hill-Gibbins directed his first professional production, Wallace Shawn’s A Thought In Three Parts, at the Battersea Arts Centre as winner of the 2002 James Menzies-Kitchen Trust Award for young directors

He trained at the Royal Court Theatre, both as an assistant director and script reader in the literary office. In 2004 he became Trainee Associate Director at the Royal Court, helping curate the Young Writer's Festival for which he directed A Girl In A Car With A Man by Rob Evans.

In 2006 Hill-Gibbins joined the staff of the Young Vic theatre. After directing Bertolt Brecht’s one-act comedy A Respectable Wedding in a new translation by Rory Bremner, he became an associate director. In 2010 he was appointed Deputy Artistic Director and directed acclaimed productions of Tennessee Williams' The Glass Menagerie and The Beauty Queen of Leenane by Martin McDonagh, which returned to the theatre in 2011.

In 2011 he also directed Penelope Skinner's new play The Village Bike at the Royal Court.

== Directing credits include ==
- The Tragedy of King Richard the Second by William Shakespeare (2018 Almeida Theatre)
- Edward II by Christopher Marlowe (2013 National Theatre)
- The Changeling by Thomas Middleton & William Rowley (2012 Young Vic)
- The Village Bike by Penelope Skinner (2011 Royal Court)
- The Glass Menagerie by Tennessee Williams (2010 Young Vic)
- The Beauty Queen of Leenane by Martin McDonagh (2010 and 2011 Young Vic)
- The Girlfriend Experience by Alecky Blythe (2008 Royal Court and Drum Plymouth, 2009 Young Vic)
- Bliss by Olivier Choinière, translated by Caryl Churchill (2009 Royal Court Theatre)
- Family Plays: The Good Family by Joakim Pirinen & The Khomenko Family Chronicles by Natalia Vorozhbit (2007 Royal Court Theatre)
- A Respectable Wedding by Bertolt Brecht, translated by Rory Bremner (2007 Young Vic)
- The Fever by Wallace Shawn (2005 Theatre 503 in association with Young Vic)
- A Girl In A Car With A Man by Rob Evans (2004 Royal Court)
- The One with the Oven by Emma Rosoman (2002 Royal Court)
- A Thought In Three Parts by Wallace Shawn (2002 Battersea Arts Centre)
