= Anything Is Possible (Darren Ockert album) =

Studio album by Darren Ockert (musician)
- Released: June 23, 2005 (United States)
- Recorded: 2005
- Genre: Pop
- Length: 46:02
- Label: Shark Meat Records
- Producer: Darren Ockert

Darren Ockert (musician) chronology
Anything Is Possible (2005)	Modern Day Living (2009)

Anything Is Possible is the first solo album by Darren Ockert released on June 23, 2005. It was nominated for a 2006 Outmusic Award. Darren was born and raised in Lincoln, England and moved to New York City in 2000 to pursue his musical ambitions.

== Description ==
As described by the producer, this album is a unique combination of honest, poetically charged lyrics with American influenced acoustic pop-rock fused with the pulse of British electronic-pop interwoven with lush vocals.

== Track listing ==
1. "The Limit" – 4:02
2. "You Were Loved" – 4:15
3. "Out Of The Rain" – 4:39
4. "Drowning" – 4:29
5. "Spread The Love" – 3:33
6. "You & I" – 3:53
7. "Looking For Something" – 3:53
8. "It Isn't Easy" – 4:54
9. "Patch Me Up" – 3:56
10. "Pie In The Sky" – 3:45
11. "A Little Too Comfortable" – 4:57
