= Opal Dream =

- Theatrical release poster
- Directed by: Peter Cattaneo
- Written by: Peter Cattaneo; Ben Rice; Phil Traill
- Produced by: Ben Rice; Finola Dwyer; Angus Finney; Robert Jones; Davil Thompson
- Starring: Vince Colosimo; Jacqueline McKenzie; Christian Byers; Sapphire Boyce
- Cinematography: Robert Humphreys
- Edited by: Jim Clark
- Music by: Christian Henson; Dario Marianelli
- Production companies: Focus Features; Strand Releasing; BBC Films; UK Film Council; South Australian Film Corporation; Academy Features; Sherman Pictures
- Distributed by: Icon Film Distribution
- Release date: 28 September 2006
- Running time: 85 minutes
- Countries: Australia; United Kingdom
- Language: English
- Budget: A$11.4 million

Opal Dream (also known as Pobby and Dingan) is a 2006 drama film, based on the 2000 Ben Rice novella Pobby and Dingan, directed by Peter Cattaneo and starring an ensemble cast including Vince Colosimo, Jacqueline McKenzie, Christian Byers and Sapphire Boyce. It was filmed on location around South Australia, in Adelaide, Coober Pedy and Woomera. Opal Dream was released in Australia on 28 September 2006, with eventual release around the world.

== Plot ==
Kellyanne (Sapphire Boyce) is led by her brother Ashmol (Christian Byers).

The film begins by introducing Kellyanne Williamson, playing with imaginary friends Pobby and Dingan. The family of Rex Williamson—his wife, Anne, daughter Kellyanne and son Ashmol—have moved to Coober Pedy, known as the "opal capital of Australia", because Rex believed he could make a fortune in mining opal. So far he's had little success. Ashmol, while he loves his sister, is frequently annoyed when she talks to her imaginary friends, and some of the kids at school tease the siblings because of them.

Rex and Anne decide it is time to separate Kellyanne from her invisible companions. Annie takes Kellyanne to a Christmas party at Annie's friend's house, Rex telling her that he will let Pobby and Dingan come with him to go opal mining. Upon Rex's return, Kellyanne says she can no longer see them and that they have disappeared. She insists on going to the opal mining area to look for them, accompanied by Rex and Ashmol. The family accidentally strays on to a neighbouring miner's claim. The miner, Sid, pulls a shotgun on Rex and calls the police, thinking that Rex was "ratting" on his territory - that is, looking for opals on his turf.

Kellyanne is grief-stricken at the loss of her imaginary friends and takes ill, although doctors can find nothing physically wrong with her. Rex has to leave his opal claim. Annie loses her job at the local supermarket, thanks to the circulating rumours around Rex's arrest. Convinced that Kellyanne is faking her illness, Ashmol nonetheless goes along with her wish that he try to find Pobby and Dingan. He even comes up with the idea of putting posters around town. Ultimately, returning to his father's mine area, Ashmol finds two lollipop wrappers. Deeper in the tunnel, he finds a large opal which he takes back to Kellyanne. He tells her he has found Pobby and Dingan, and that they are dead.

Kellyanne, whose sickness has been worsening, has to go to hospital. Ashmol sells his opal and pays for a funeral for Pobby and Dingan. He has made friends with a lawyer, who takes Rex's case. Rex wins the trial.

Many people in town begin to feel that their attitude toward Kellyanne and her family may have contributed to her sickness. These people show up at Pobby and Dingan's funeral. Kellyanne, though still sick, is there, and throws lollipops into her imaginary friends' graves. A short time later, Kellyanne herself dies, and is buried between her imaginary friends. Ashmol visits her grave. Rex gets his claim back, and Ashmol is allowed to accompany him on mining trips.

=== Ending ===
In the original release of the film, the death of Kellyanne was not shown; after Pobby and Dingan's funeral, the screen fades to white, and the film ends. This cut was made against the wishes of the director and crew but did air uncut and as originally intended when shown on BBC Two in 2008.

== Cast ==
Actor	Role
Vince Colosimo	Rex Williamson
Jacqueline McKenzie	Annie Williamson
Christian Byers	Ashmol Williamson
Sapphire Boyce	Kellyanne Williamson
Peter Callan	Dan Dunkley
Andy McPhee	Harris
Robert Menzies	Humph
Adam Morgan	Donny
Rusty Potter	mLyndon Dunkley
Denise Roberts	Vera Dunkley
Nicholas Bell	Judge McNulty

== Production and distribution ==
The film was financed by the BBC and produced through Academy Films. The film was commercially released on Amazon in 2007, and is available as region 1 and 2 DVDs.

== Reaction ==
The film has had some early critical success at various international film festivals, including the 2005 Berlin International Film Festival and the 2006 Melbourne International Film Festival. On review aggregator Rotten Tomatoes, the film holds an approval rating of 69% based on 35 reviews, with an average rating of 6.14/10. The website's critics consensus reads: "Earnest performances and Peter Cattaneo's sympathetic direction gives heart to the simple, timeworn script."

== Box office ==
Opal Dream grossed $64,461 at the box office in Australia, and $140,666 worldwide

== See also ==
- Cinema of Australia
- South Australian Film Corporation
