= The Village Bike =

2011 play by Penelope Skinner

- Original language: English
- Written by: Penelope Skinner
- Characters: 3 male, 3 female

Premiere
- Date: 2011; Royal Court Theatre in London
- Place: Britain

The Village Bike is a 2011 play by Penelope Skinner which premiered at the Royal Court Theatre in London. It won the 2011 George Devine Award and received rave reviews and had an extended sellout run.

== Plot ==
Becky, a newly-pregnant school teacher, has just moved into the countryside with her husband John. While he no longer has any interest in sex and prefers to read baby books and save the environment, Becky becomes increasingly frustrated and flirts with the plumber Mike. Off work due to the summer holidays and with high rising temperatures, Becky decides to get fit by buying a bike from the local eccentric, Oliver. Despite neighbour Jenny plying the couple with her second-hand baby equipment, Becky finds herself sexually frustrated and desperate for someone to view her as an attractive woman.

Soon Becky embarks on a secret affair with Oliver but is determined not to become attached, instead playing out her fantasies from John's old stash of porn films, which she has been driven to watching. With Oliver's wife returning, he insists on ending the affair. Realising how attached she now is, Becky becomes desperate and John more suspicious. After filming herself having sex with Mike, she cycles to see Oliver, but runs into his wife. Leaving in tears she falls off her bike; not badly hurt but emotionally devastated, she takes to her bed. Jenny and John discuss Becky, but, after John finds a stash of plastic bags that Becky has stuffed into a cupboard, he storms upstairs to have her irresponsibility out with her. Terrified that she's been found out, she argues with him, but soon, realising that John is angry about the plastic bags, she gives up, begging him to let things go back to how they were at the start of the holidays.

== Premiere ==
Directed by Joe Hill-Gibbins in 2011 at the Royal Court Theatre in London it starred Romola Garai as Becky with the rest of the cast made up of Nicholas Burns, Dominic Rowan, Alexandra Gilbreath, Phil Cornwell. It was a critical and box office success and the show was extended twice.

== Reception ==
Winning the George Devine Award in 2011 the play was a critical success, receiving 4 stars in The Daily Telegraph, with Dominic Cavendish calling it "mercilessly funny – and savagely insightful".
