= Polka Theatre =

Children's theater in Wimbledon, London, England

Coordinates: 51.4196°N 0.1949°W

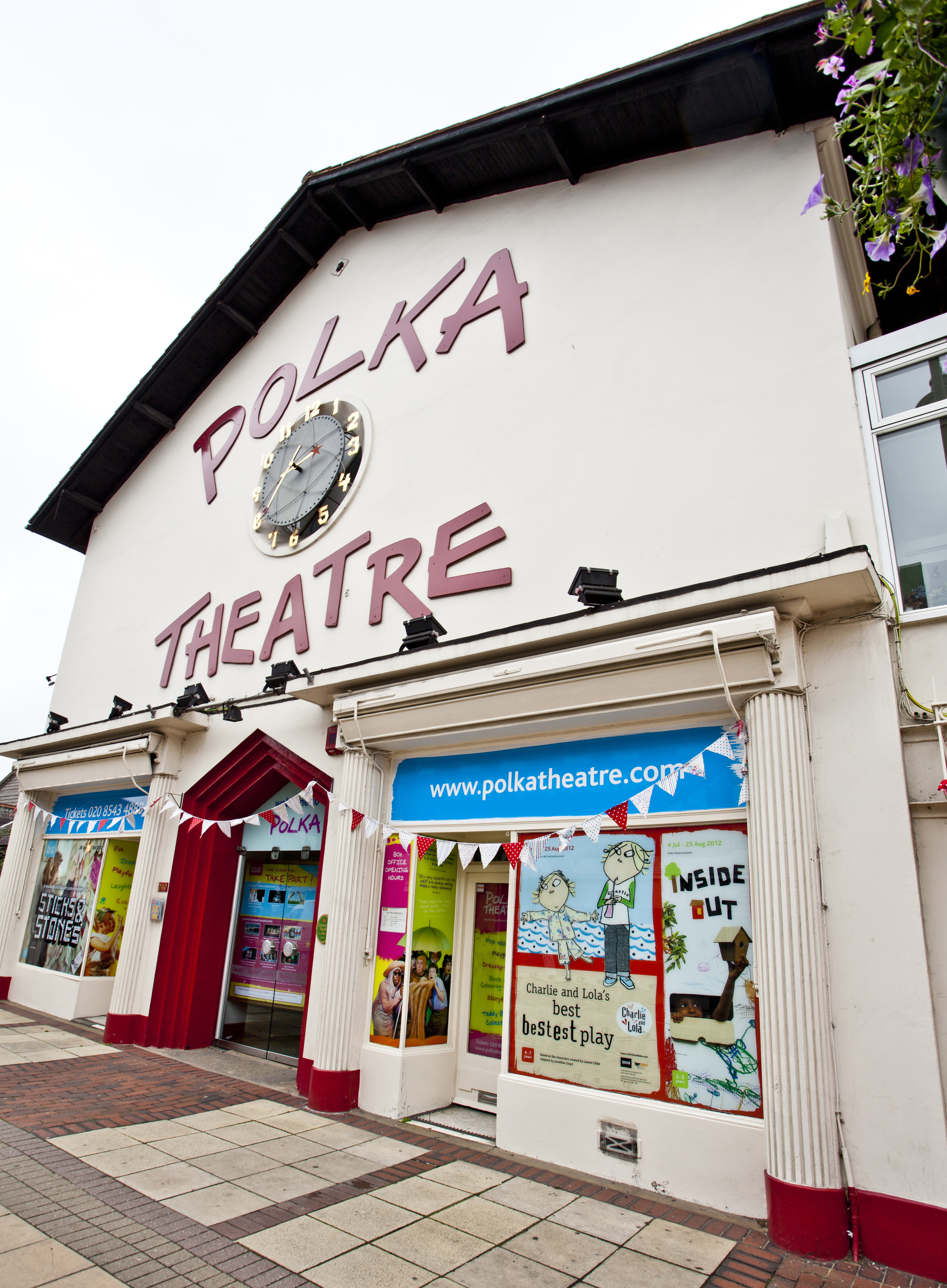
- Polka Theatre
- Interactive map of Polka Theatre
- Address: The Broadway, Wimbledon
- Location: London, SW19
- Capacity: Main auditorium 300; Studio 70; Total 370
- Type: Theatre
- Event: Children's theatre
- Public transit: Wimbledon

Website
- http://www.polkatheatre.com

Polka Theatre is a children’s theatre in Wimbledon, London Borough of Merton, for children aged 0– 13. The theatre contains two performance spaces - a 300-seat main auditorium and a 70-seat studio dedicated to early years performances. Polka Theatre is a producing theatre which also tours shows nationally and internationally.

The building also features a creative learning studio, a garden, an outdoor playground, indoor play area, exhibition spaces and a cafe.

Polka Theatre is a registered charity number 256979 and an Arts Council England National Portfolio Organisation. It is also funded by the London Borough of Merton and a number of private charitable trusts and foundations, individuals and commercial companies.

== History ==
Polka Theatre started life as a puppet touring company in 1967 under the Artistic Directorship of Richard Gill. The theatre venue (formerly the Holy Trinity Halls in Wimbledon) opened on 20 November 1979 and was the UK’s first theatre venue dedicated exclusively to children. The opening was marked with a Gala performance attended by Queen Elizabeth The Queen Mother.

By 1983 Polka was regularly programming and producing productions aimed specifically at children under 5 in its studio space, known as the Adventure Theatre. The Adventure Theatre hosts in house productions and visiting productions from the UK and overseas. Over recent years Polka has developed its Early Years work for children aged from 6 months.

Polka Theatre won the Vivien Duffield Theatre Award to begin the audience development initiative, Curtain-Up! in 1994. The scheme offers free theatre tickets to disadvantaged schools whose pupils would otherwise not have the opportunity to experience theatre due to financial or other difficulties, supplemented by money to cover transport costs and a free post-show drama workshop to support the visits. That same year, Polka also hosted the debut of Fun Song Factory, a series of direct-to-video live shows commissioned by Abbey Home Entertainment, which centered around a factory creating music. The show featured presenters Iain Lauchlan, Sarah Davison and Dave Benson Phillips and several children singing a number of famous nursery rhymes and classic children's songs. The show is considered one of Polka's most important theatrical premieres.

The building temporarily closed for a major redevelopment on Monday 18 February 2019, with building work commencing in March 2019. The planned reopening was Summer 2020 but was delayed due to the effects of the pandemic. Cinderella: the AWESOME Truth was then scheduled for November 2021 as the Theatre's first production after reopening.

In 2025, Polka's larger theatre space reopened following a period of modernisation, and was renamed the Y C Chan Theatre.

=== Artistic Directors ===
The current Artistic Director Helen Matravers was appointed in January 2023, having previously been Senior Producer.

- 1967- 1988 Richard Gill
- 1988- 2002 Vicky Ireland
- 2002- 2007 Annie Wood
- 2007– 2013 Jonathan Lloyd
- 2013– 2023 Peter Glanville
- 2023- present Helen Matravers

== Awards ==
- 2014 Eleanor Farjeon Award winner
- 2015 Offie for Best Production for Young People (under 8 years) for Peter Pan.
- 2025 The Nutcracker received an Olivier Nomination for Best Family Show.

== Gallery ==
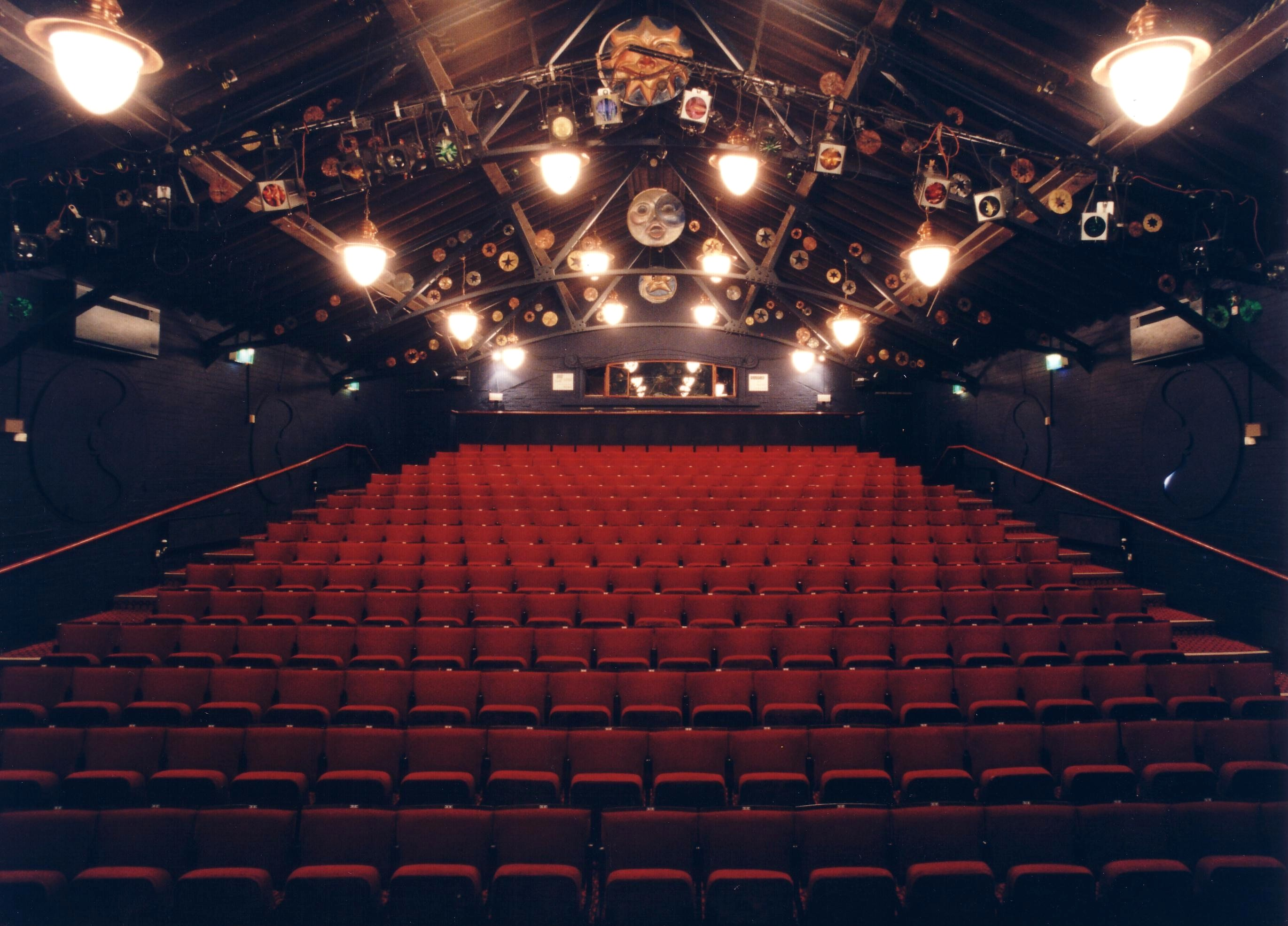
Polka Theatre's main auditorium

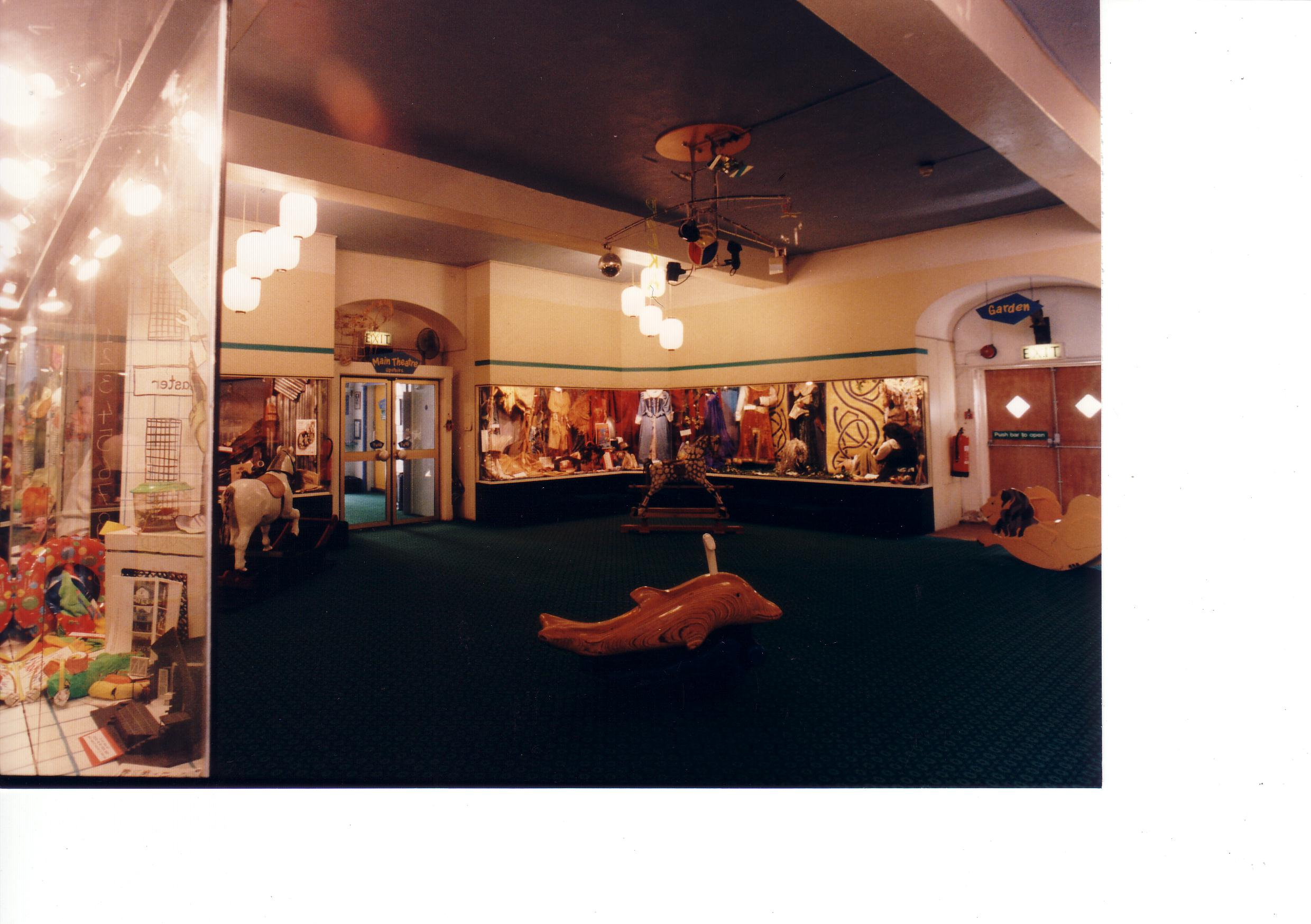
Polka Theatre's Exhibition Area

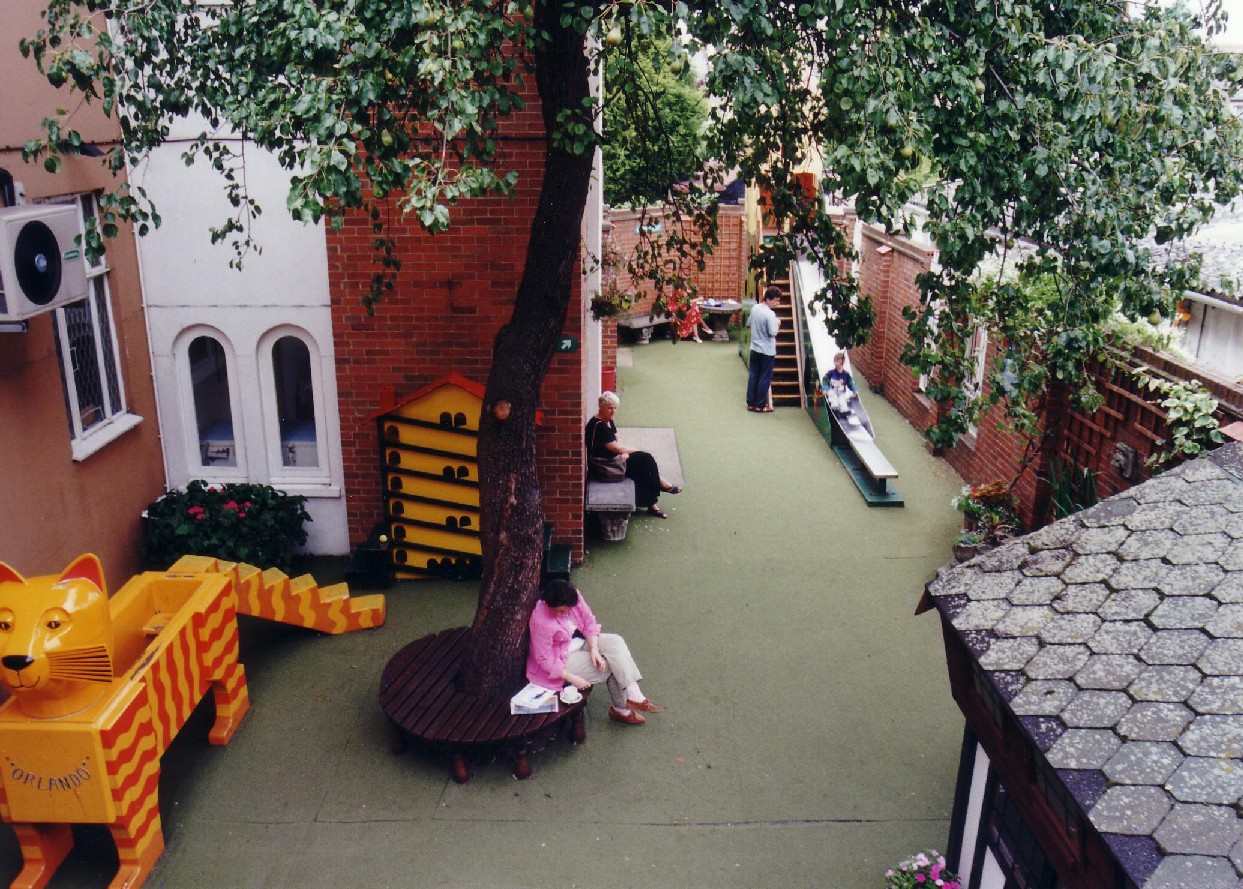
Polka Theatre Playground

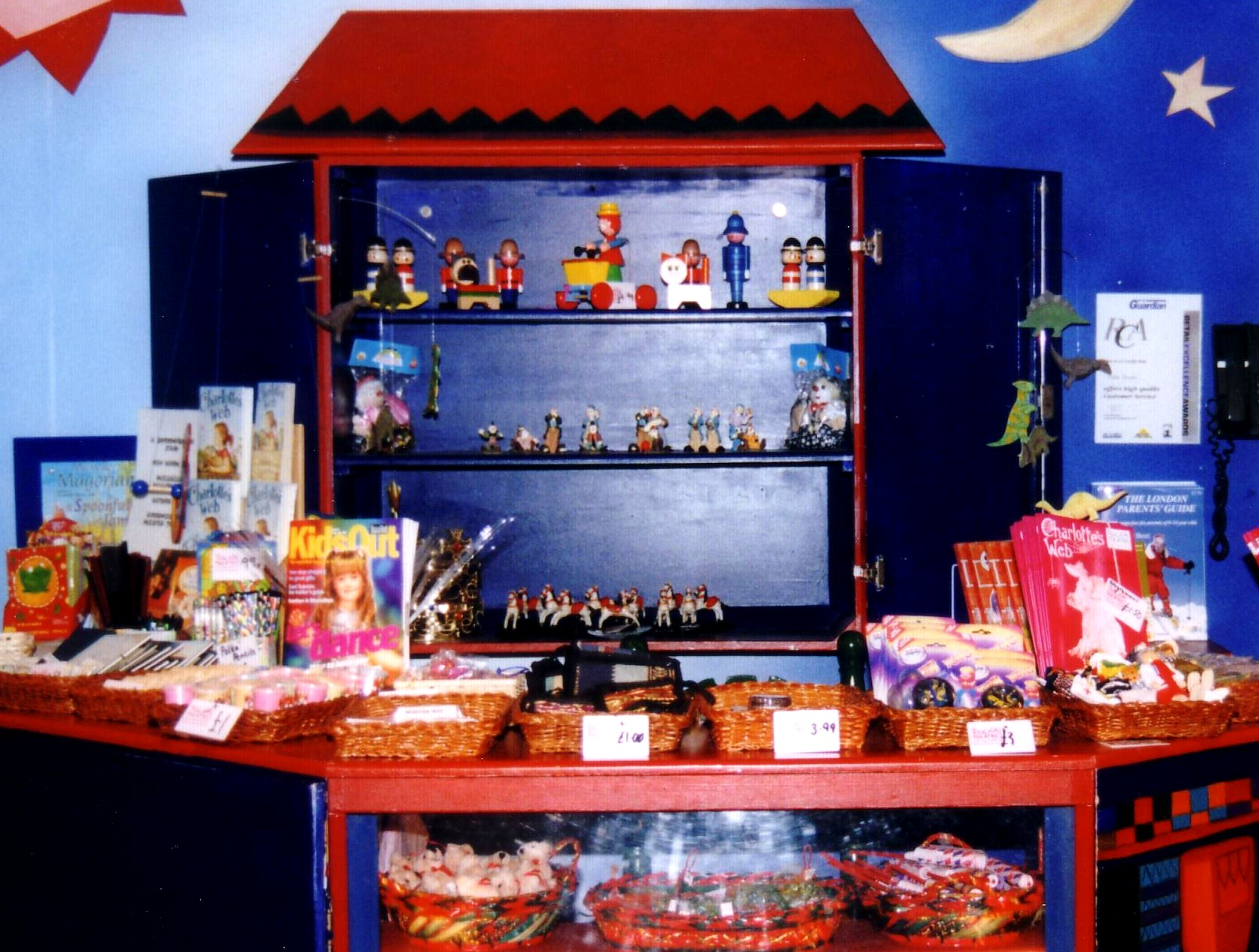
The theatre toyshop

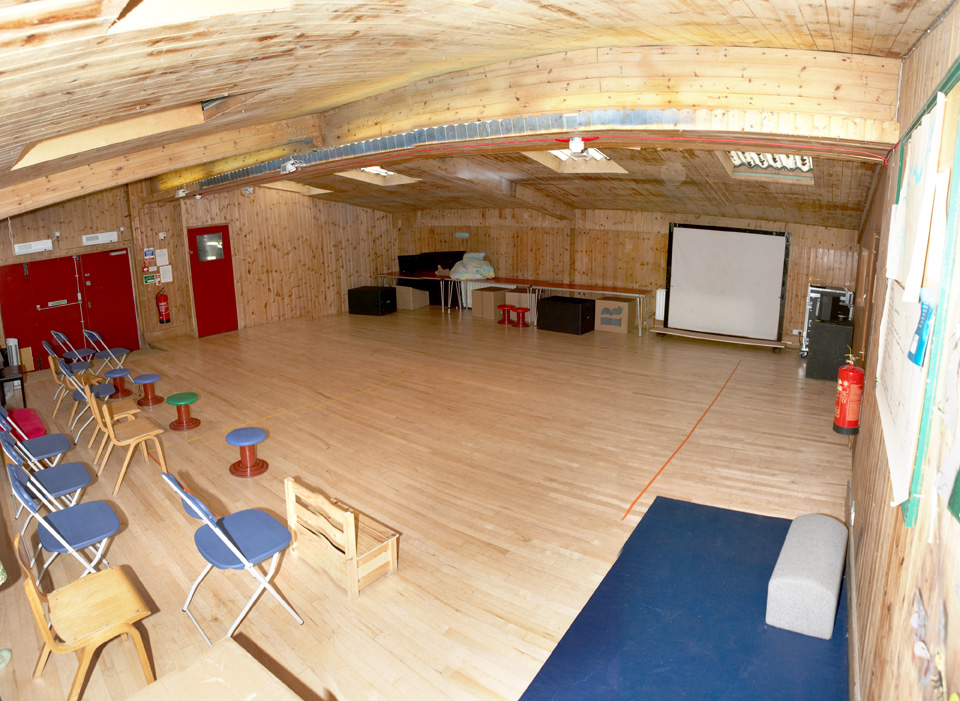
Polka Theatre's Annex

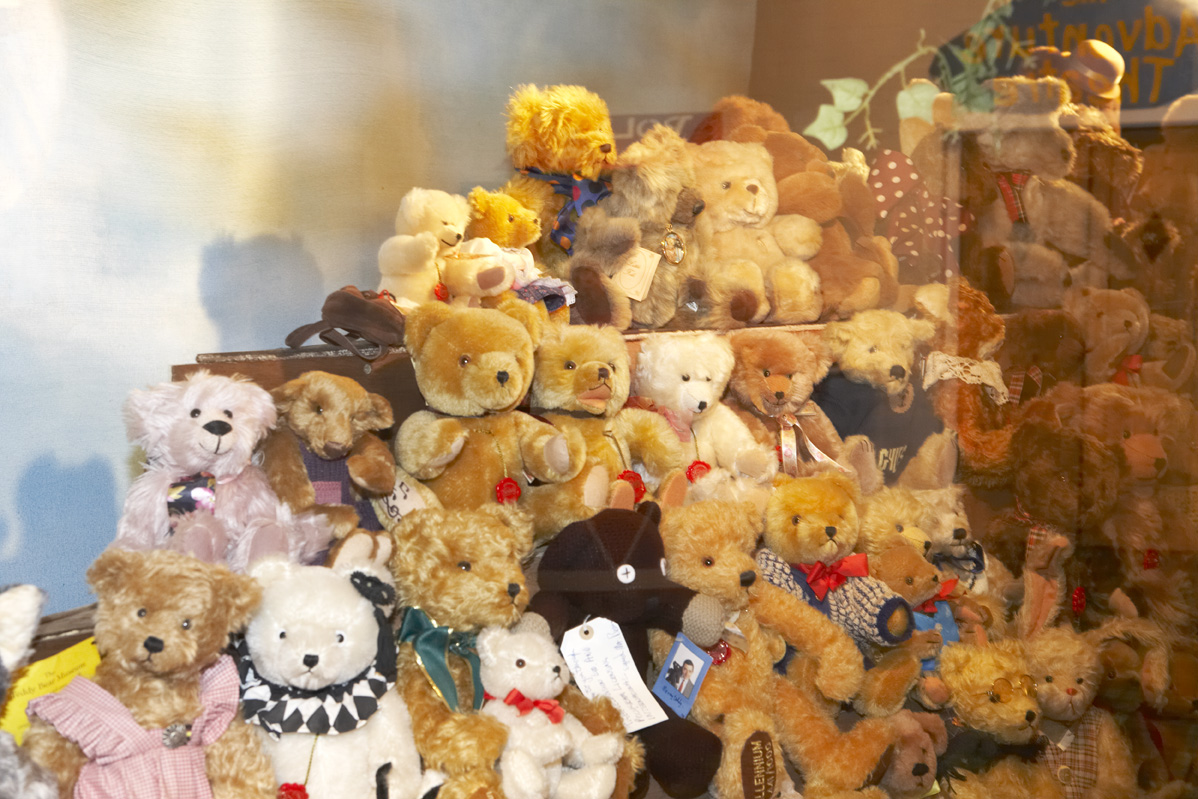
Teddy Bear Collection, Polka Theatre
