= Christian Byers =

Australian actor (born 1993)

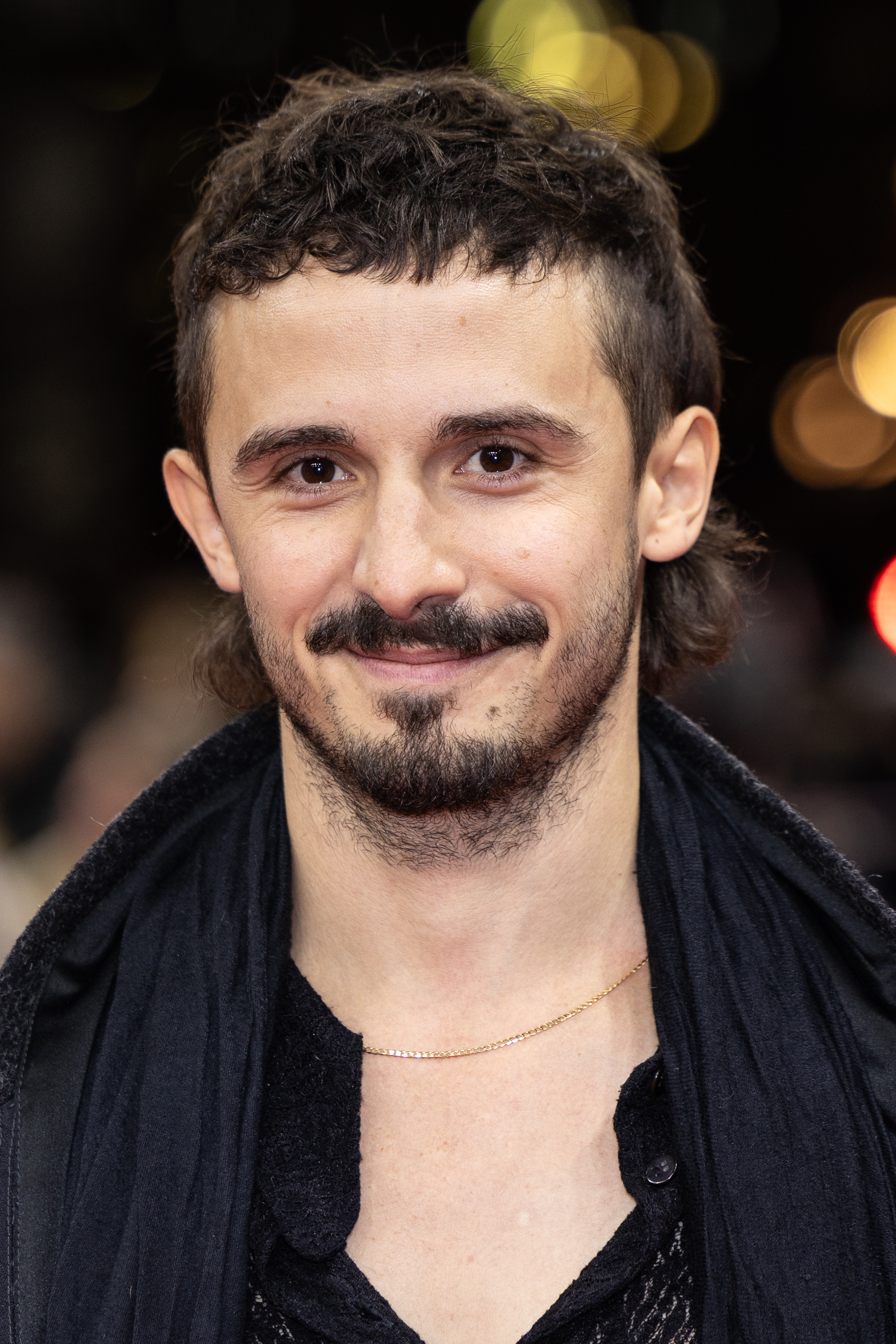
- Christian Byers in 2025
- Born: c. 1993; Sydney, New South Wales, Australia
- Occupation: Actor
- Years active: 2006─present

Christian Byers (born c. 1993) is an Australian actor.

== Early life and education ==
Byers was born around 1993 in Sydney, New South Wales. Even as a three-year-old, he was creating film scenarios, and his first public performance was as Romeo in year 4.

He attended Fort Street High School in Petersham, while living in the Inner West of Sydney.

== Career ==
In 2006, aged 12, he made his film debut in Opal Dream, before featuring in December Boys (2007) alongside Daniel Radcliffe.

Also in 2007, he portrayed Jacob in Hey, Hey, It's Esther Blueburger.

In November 2025 Byers appeared in the Bump film.

== Filmography ==
=== Television ===
Year	Title	Role	Note
2014	Puberty Blues	Woody	9 episodes
2015	Ready for This	Reece Scott	13 episodes
2017	Newton's Law	Harry Sutton	Miniseries
2017	True Story with Hamish and Andy	Sal	1 episode ("Sal")
2017	Friday On My Mind	Stevie Wright	Miniseries
2020	Between Two Worlds	Miles	1 episode ("A Big Enough Lie")
2022	El Día Menos Pensado	El Contrato	1 episode ("El Contrato")
2021-2024	Bump	Bowie Chalmers-Davies	37 episodes

=== Film ===
Year	Title	Role	Note
2006	Opal Dream	Ashmol Williamson	
2007	December Boys	Sparky	
2008	Hey, Hey, It's Esther Blueburger	Jacob Blueburger	
2010	The Tree	Tim	
2010	Purple Flowers	Jack	Short film
2011	Panic at Rock Island	Elmo Quinn	
2014	Kettle	Kris	Short film
2014	The Invisible Man	-	Short film, director & writer
2016	Gipsey	Charlie	Short film
2017	Dance Academy: The Movie	Student Dex	
2018	Riot	Murph	TV movie
2018	Shiloh	Jordan	Short film
2018	Safety Driver	Safety Driver	Short film
2019	Snare	Bandmate	Short film
2019	Laura	Josh	Short film, also writer
2023	The Moogai	Constable Flatley	
2025	Bump: A Christmas Film	Bowie Davis	Film

== Awards ==
Awards and Nominations
Year	Awards	Group	Film	Result
2006	Australian Film Institute Awards	AFI Young Actor Award	Opal Dream	Nominated
