= Academy Films =

- Industry: Film production Television production
- Founded: 1985
- Founder: Lizie Gower
- Headquarters: London, England
- Website: Academy Films

Academy Films is a British film production company creating commercials, music videos, short films, digital content, art installations and feature films. The company's head office is in London, UK.

== History ==
The company was founded by Lizie Gower in 1985 and is now run by joint Managing Directors / Executive Producers Simon Cooper and Medb Riordan. In 1997, director Jonathan Glazer's video Virtual Insanity for Jamiroquai earned 10 nominations at the MTV Video Music Awards, winning in four categories including 'Video of the Year'.

Academy Films has produced many TV and online advertisements. Glazer's commercial for Guinness, titled 'Surfer' is Academy's most recognisable commercial. The film was produced in 1998/99 for AMV BBDO and written by Walter Campbell and Tom Carty. The film represented Guinness's famous line, 'Good things come to those who wait'. The film won two Black Pencils at D&AD and remains one of advertisings most famous pieces of work.

Academy has produced two feature films, Birth in 2004 starring Nicole Kidman and Lauren Bacall, directed by Glazer, and Opal Dream by Peter Cattaneo in 2006, both produced by Lizie Gower.

Commercials aside, Academy produces music videos, light and sound installations, digital work and short films. Among the music videos are Jamiroquai's 'Virtual Insanity', 'Bittersweet Symphony' by the Verve, 'Street Spirit (Fade Out)' by Radiohead and Massive Attack's 'Teardrop'. For its music videos, Academy has won MTV awards, CADS, MVAs and D&AD Pencils for work by Glazer, Martin de Thurah, Walter Stern, Corin Hardy, Us and Seb Edwards. In addition, both Stern and Glazer been given Icon Awards by the UKMVAs (formerly the CADS).

The most recent music video output includes the title track from Jon Hopkins latest album 'Singularity' directed by Seb Edwards, 'Over & Over & Over' made for Jack White, 'Follow Me Around' by Radiohead and Rolling Stones track 'Scarlett' starring Paul Mescal made by directing duo, Us.

In 2012, Academy partnered with production company Reset in the US. Reset was founded by David Fincher and Dave Morrison. Reset represents Academy directors in the US, while Academy represents Reset directors in the UK.

== Selected Music Videos ==
- Massive Attack - 'Karmacoma' (1995)
- Blur - 'The Universal' (1995)
- Radiohead - 'Street Spirit (Fade Out)' (1996)
- Jamiroquai - 'Virtual Insanity' (1996)
- Massive Attack - 'Angel' (1997)
- The Verve - 'Bittersweet Symphony' (1997)
- Radiohead - 'Karma Police' (1997)
- Massive Attack - 'Tear Drop' (1998)
- UNKLE - 'Rabbit in Your Headlights' (1998)
- Madonna - 'Drowned World/Substitute For Love' (1998)
- Audio Bullies - 'We Don't Care' (2003)
- Kanye West - 'Flashing Lights - Version 2' (2008)
- Will Young - 'Changes' (2008)
- Paolo Nutini - 'Pencil Full of Lead' (2009)
- The Dead Weather - 'Treat Me Like Your Mother' (2009)
- The Prodigy - 'Warrior's Dance' (2009)
- James Blake - 'Limit to Your Love' (2010)
- Feist - 'The Bad in Each Other' (2011)
- Wiley - 'Numbers in Action' (2011)
- James Blake - 'A Case of You' (2011)
- Antony & The Johnsons - 'Cut The World' (2012)
- Jon Hopkins - 'Singularity' (2018)
- Jack White - 'Over & Over' (2018)
- Beardyman ft. Joe Rogan - 6am (Ready To Write) (2019)
- The Rolling Stones - 'Scarlett' (2020)
- Travis Scott ft. Young Thug & MIA - 'Franchise' (2020)
- Radiohead - 'Follow Me Around' (2021)

== Selected Commercial credits ==
- Nike 'Frozen Moment (1996)
- Volkswagen 'Protection' (1997)
- Nike 'Parklife' (1997)
- Guinness 'Swimblack' (1998)
- Stella Artois 'Last Orders' (1998)
- Guinness 'Surfer' (1999)
- Volkswagen 'Heaven' (2000)
- Wrangler 'Ride' (2000)
- Levis 'Odyssey' (2001)
- American Airlines 'Seats' (2001)
- Vauxhall Corsa 'Hide & Seek' (2002)
- BBC 1xtra 'Street Music' (2002)
- Stella Artois 'Devils Island' (2003)
- Levis 'Bike' (2004)
- Honda 'Dreams' (2005)
- Stella Artois 'Ice Skating Priests' (2005)
- PlayStation 'Pace of Life' (2005)
- Department for Transport 'Lucky' (2005)
- Miller 'Downhill' (2005)
- Sony Bravia 'Paint' (2006)
- Orange 'Belonging' (2006)
- Vodafone 'Time Theft' (2007)
- Sony 'Music Pieces' (2007)
- Volkswagen 'Like A Golf' (2009)
- The FA 'Kick It Out' (2010)
- Match.com 'Piano' (2010)
- Ikea 'Kitchen Party' (2010)
- Thomson 'Time for a Holiday' (2011)
- NSPCC 'The $#*! Kids Say' (2012)
- Thinkbox 'Harvey & Rabbit' (2012)
- Camelot 'Dreams' (2012)
- Hovis 'Farmer's Lad' (2012)
- Morrisons 'For Your Christmas' (2012)
- Robinsons 'Pals' (2013)
- The Sunday Times 'Icons' (2014)
- Avis 'Unlock The World' (2014)
- Canon 'Gladiator Football' (2014)
- Thinkbox 'Harvey & Harmony' (2014)
- The Prince's Trust 'Learn The Hard Way (2015)
- Channel 4 Rebrand (2015)
- SSE 'Pier' (2015)
- Virgin Media '9.58' (2016)
- No. 7 'Chimamanda' (2016)
- HP 'Brothers' (2016)
- Bupa 'For Owning The Dancefloor' (2017)
- Lacoste 'Timeless' (2017)
- Cadbury 'Mum's Birthday' (2018)
- Pride In London 'Somewhere Over The Rainbow' 2018
- Squarespace 'Make It Happen' (2018)
- John Lewis 'The Boy & The Piano (2018)
- Apple Watch 'Flight' (2019)
- Lucozade 'Three Lionesses' (2019)
- DPA 'The Diamond Journey' (2019)
- Renault Clio 'French Exchange' (2019)
- Playstation 'Tear' (2019)
- Three 'Real 5G' (2020)
- Cadbury 'The Originals' (2020)
- Bloom & Wild 'Big Sis' (2020)
- Alexander McQueen 'First Light' (2020)
- Alzheimers Society 'Cure The Care System' (2021)
- Amazon 'Reaching Out' (2021)

== Awards – Commercials ==
Academy have won commercial awards from around the world, including Lions at the Cannes Advertising Festival, British Arrows and Arrows Craft, APA Collection, Kinsale Advertising Festival, The Creative Circle, One Show, AICP, Epica, Eurobest, Clios, London International, Ciclope and Yellow Pencils plus two Black Pencils at the D&AD Awards. In 2012 Academy were presented with a special Black Pencil as the third most awarded production company over 50 years of the D&AD.

Campaign Magazine ranked Academy as Production Company of the Year in 2014 and 2016, and Production Company of the Decade runner up 2010 - 2019. In 2020 Academy were ranked 1st in the Commercial 30 annual survey of the advertising industry. At the 2021 Ciclope Festival in Berlin, Jonathan Glazer's film for Alexander McQueen was awarded the Grand Prix; the festival's highest accolade.
