= Penelope Skinner =

British playwright

- Born: United Kingdom
- Occupations: Playwright, screenwriter

Penelope Skinner (born 1978) is a British playwright. She came to prominence after her play Fucked was first produced in 2008 at the Old Red Lion Theatre and the Edinburgh Festival to critical acclaim and has had other plays staged in London including at the Bush Theatre, National Theatre and Royal Court Theatre.

Skinner's play Eigengrau, staged at the Bush Theatre in 2010, was a critical and box office hit and Skinner was nominated for the Evening Standard Award for Most Promising Playwright in 2010. Her play The Village Bike was her first play to be staged at the Royal Court Theatre where it had a sell out, twice-extended run starring Romola Garai and directed by Joe Hill-Gibbins, winning her the George Devine Award and the Evening Standard Award for Most Promising Playwright in 2011. In 2011, she wrote episodes for the Channel 4 series Fresh Meat. In the same year, her play The Sound of Heavy Rain was produced by Paines Plough and Sheffield Theatres touring in Roundabout. In 2012. her play Fred's Diner was staged at the Chichester Festival Theatre's pop-up stage, following which The Independent newspaper described Skinner as "Our leading young feminist writer." In 2013, Skinner co-wrote the screenplay for the film How I Live Now.

In 2015, Skinner's play "Linda", staged at London's Royal Court theatre, "raises important questions with bracing rhetorical force" Timeout. Also in 2015, her off-broadway play "The Ruins of Civilisations" was described as offering "a powerful portrait of an anguished woman fixating on the prospect of a baby as a source of affection, hope and escape" by The Guardian, In 2018, her play "Meek", staged at the Traverse in Edinburgh, "probes into power, resistance and men's rights"

In 2023, Skinner's play "Lyonesse" opened at The Harold Pinter Theatre. The German-language premiere was scheduled to place at Theater Baden-Baden in January 2025.

== Work ==
- 2023 Lyonesse, Harold Pinter Theatre; London directed by Ian Rickson
- 2018 Angry Alan premiered at Edinburgh Fringe Festival, written with Don Mackay, renewed in 2025 with Sam Gold to direct and John Krasinski to star
- 2018 Meek premiered at Traverse Theatre directed by Amy Hodge
- 2017 Linda Manhattan Theatre Club, New York; directed by Lynne Meadow
- 2015 Linda Royal Court Theatre
- 2015 The Ruins of Civilization premiered at Manhattan Theatre Club directed by Leah C. Gardiner
- 2012 Fred's Diner premiered at Chichester Festival Theatre directed by Tim Hoare
- 2011 The Sound of Heavy Rain premiered as part of Paines Plough's Roundabout Season directed by James Grieve
- 2011 The Village Bike premiered at the Royal Court Theatre directed by Joe Hill-Gibbins
- 2011 Greenland co-written with Moira Buffini, Matt Charman and Jack Thorne premiered at the National Theatre directed by Bijan Sheibani
- 2010 Come To Where I'm From Season a short play commissioned by Paines Plough premiered at the Oxford Playhouse
- 2010 Don't Look Back premiered at the Young Vic directed by Natalie Ibu
- 2010 Eigengrau premiered at the Bush Theatre directed by Polly Findlay
- 2008 Fucked premiered at the Old Red Lion Theatre directed by Daniel Goldman then went to the Edinburgh Festival in 2009
