= Catherine Wheels Theatre Company =

Scottish charity

Catherine Wheels Theatre Company is a Scotland-based charitable organisation formed in 1999 by Artistic Director Gill Robertson. In 17 years, Catherine Wheels has shown more than 21 productions to an approximate total audience of over 500,000.

The company's productions include:

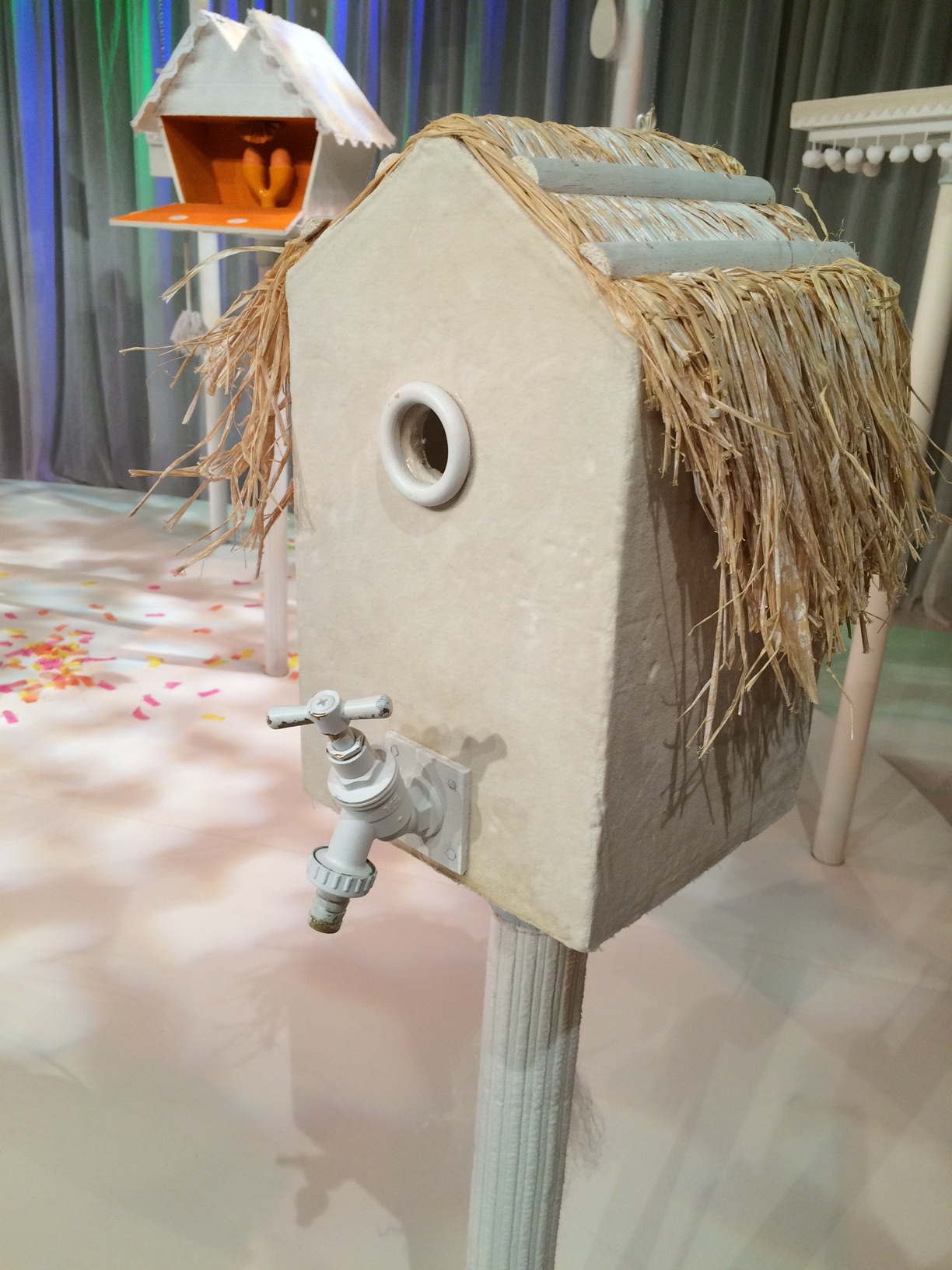
Set from White, 2010. Design by Shona Reppe.

- Martha: First devised in 1999 and performed in theatres throughout the UK, Ireland, Australia, Singapore and North America, including the New Victory Theater in New York. Winner of the 2008 'Best Production' award at the Shanghai International Children’s Festival.
- Lifeboat: Devised in 2002, winner of the Barclays Stage Award for Best Show for Children and Young People 2002. Performed at the New Victory Theater, New York, the Edinburgh Fringe Festival and New Zealand International Arts Festival. Lifeboat was also the first production by a Scottish children’s theatre company to be staged at the Sydney Opera House.
- White: A performance designed for audiences aged under 4, originally devised in 2010. Winner of multiple awards including a Scotsman Fringe First 2010, a 2010 Herald Angel, a 2010 Total Theatre Award for Physical/Visual Theatre, Best Children's Production at the 2011 Theatre Awards UK and Three 2010 Critics Awards for Theatre in Scotland: Best Design, Best Technical Presentation and Best Production for Children and Young People. White was adapted into a mobile app in 2014. On 18 November 2015, White celebrated its 1000th performance as part of a run at the New Victory Theater in New York.

Other productions include Caged, Pobby and Dingan (TMA 2010 award winner for Best Show for Children and Young People), The Book of Beasts, Something Wicked This Way Comes (with National Theatre of Scotland), The Ballad of Pondlife McGurk, Hansel and Gretel, Kes, The Lion of Kabul, The Book of Beasts, Cyrano, Snow Baby, The Story of the Little Gentleman and The Voice Thief.

A resident company at the Brunton Theatre, Musselburgh, Catherine Wheels Theatre Company is a primarily government-supported organisation, issued core funding via the Scottish creative arts council, Creative Scotland.
