= UK Theatre Awards =

Annual British theatre awards, formerly TMA Awards

- Description: Awards presented in recognition of creative excellence and outstanding work in regional theatre throughout England, Scotland, Wales and Northern Ireland
- Country: United Kingdom
- Presented by: UK Theatre (formerly the Theatrical Management Association)

The UK Theatre Awards, established in 1991 and known before 2011 as the TMA Awards, are presented annually by UK Theatre (formerly the Theatrical Management Association) in recognition of creative excellence and outstanding work in regional theatre throughout England, Scotland, Wales and Northern Ireland.

== Past winning productions ==
Year	Best New Play	Best Musical	Best Show for Children and Young People	Best Touring Production
2025	Flumps by Emma Jo Pallett, a Mercury Theatre Original production in association with The Thelmas	Jesus Christ Superstar, a Watermill Theatre production by arrangement with LW Entertainment	Pig Heart Boy, a Children's Theatre Partnership, Unicorn Theatre & Sheffield Theatres co-production	n/a
2024	Swim, Aunty, Swim!, a Belgrade Theatre production in association with tiata fahodzi	Oliver!, a Leeds Playhouse production by special arrangement with Cameron Mackintosh	Beauty And The Beast, a Stephen Joseph Theatre production	n/a
2023	Enough Of Him, a National Theatre of Scotland and Pitlochry Festival Theatre co-production	Gypsy, a The Mill at Sonning production	The SpongeBob Musical, a Showpath Entertainment production	n/a
2022	Mugabe, My Dad & Me, an ETT, Brixton House & York Theatre Royal in association with Alison Holder co-production	Billy Elliot The Musical, a Made at Curve production	Fantastically Great Women Who Changed The World, a Kenny Wax Family Entertainment in association with MAST Mayflower Studios	n/a
2019	Life of Pi adapted by Lolita Chakrabarti, a Sheffield Theatres production	Standing At The Sky’s Edge a Sheffield Theatres production	Billionaire Boy The Musical a Nuffield Southampton Theatres production in association with Belgrade Theatre, Coventry	n/a
2018	The Almighty Sometimes a Royal Exchange Theatre production	The Assassination of Katie Hopkins, a Theatr Clwyd production	The Little Mermaid, a The Egg – Theatre Royal Bath and Pins and Needles co-production	Three Sisters, a RashDash and Royal Exchange Theatre co-production
2017	Narvik by Lizzie Nunnery, a Box of Tricks production	Everybody's Talking About Jamie, a Sheffield Theatres production	The Snow Queen, a New Vic Theatre production	The Who’s Tommy, a New Wolsey Theatre Ipswich and Ramps on the Moon co-production
2016	Cuttin' It by Charlene James, a Young Vic/Royal Court Theatre co-production with Birmingham Repertory Theatre, Sheffield Theatres and The Yard Theatre	Flowers for Mrs Harris, a Sheffield Theatres Production Show Boat, a Sheffield Theatres production	The Hobbit, a The Dukes production	The Herbal Bed, a co-production by Royal & Derngate Northampton, English Touring Theatre and Rose Theatre Kingston
2015	Iphigenia in Splott a Sherman Cymru production	Gypsy, a Chichester Festival Theatre production	Running Wild, a Chichester Festival Youth Theatre production	Twelfth Night, an English Touring Theatre and Sheffield Theatres production
2014	An August Bank Holiday Lark by Deborah McAndrew, a Northern Broadsides production in partnership with New Vic Theatre, Newcastle-under-Lyme, on tour	Brass, a National Youth Music Theatre production at City varieties Music Hall, Leeds	Dragon, a National Theatre of Scotland, Vox Motus and Tianjin People's Art Theatre, China production, at the Citizens Theatre and Traverse Theatre	Translations, English Touring Theatre
2013	Bull a Sheffield Theatres production	This Is My Family, a Sheffield Theatres production	The Borrowers, a Northern Stage, Newcastle production and Mister Holgado, a Unicorn Theatre production	The Full Monty, a Sheffield Theatres production, presented by David Pugh (theatre producer) and Dafydd Rogers
2012	In The Next Room a Theatre Royal Bath production in the Ustinov Studio	The Go-Between, a West Yorkshire Playhouse, Royal & Derngate, Northampton and Derby LIVE! production at West Yorkshire Playhouse	The Curious Scrapbook of Josephine Bean by Shona Reppe on tour	Anne Boleyn - English Touring Theatre's presentation of the Shakespeare's Globe production
2011	Love, Love, Love, a Drum Theatre Plymouth and Paines Plough production at the Drum Theatre Plymouth, and on tour	Matilda the Musical, an RSC production at the Courtyard Theatre, Stratford-upon-Avon	White a Catherine Wheels production	Richard III and The Comedy of Errors: both Propeller productions, in association with The Touring Partnership, on tour
2010	Spur of the Moment at The Royal Court	Sweeney Todd - a Dundee Rep Ensemble production, at Dundee Rep	Pobby and Dingan - a Catherine Wheels Theatre Company production, in association with Brunton Theatre, Musselburgh	The Empire – a Royal Court Theatre and Drum Theatre Plymouth production
2009	ENRON a Headlong, Chichester Festival Theatre and Royal Court Theatre production at Chichester Festival Theatre	Spend Spend Spend at Watermill, Newbury	For The Best Presented by the Unicorn Theatre in collaboration with Mark Storor and Anna Ledgard	Noël Coward's Brief Encounter, David Pugh and Dafydd Rogers and Cineworld present The Kneehigh Theatre Production in a co production with Royal and Derngate Northampton
2008	The Pitman Painters at Live Theatre, Newcastle	Once Upon a Time at the Adelphi at the Playhouse, Liverpool	Looking for JJ adapted from Anne Cassidy's novel by Marcus Romer at the Pilot Theatre	
2007	That Face at the Jerwood Theatre Upstairs at the Royal Court	Sunshine on Leith at Dundee Rep	Citizens' Theatre/Tag's Yellow Moon (The Ballad Of Leila And Lee) at the Citizens', Glasgow and tour	
2006	Rubenstein Kiss by James Phillips at Hampstead Theatre	Road To Nowhere at the Lyric Hammersmith	National Theatre of Scotland and Improbable's The Wolves In The Walls on tour	
2005	Pyrenees by David Greig, Tron Theatre Company and Paines Plough	How To Succeed In Business Without Really Trying at the Festival Theatre, Chichester	Alice's Adventures In Wonderland at Bristol Old Vic	
2004	The Sugar Syndrome by Lucy Prebble at the Royal Court Jerwood Theatre Upstairs	The Hired Man at Salisbury Playhouse	Arthur, The Story Of A King, Wee Stories & The Scottish Touring Consortium co-created by Andy Cannon, Iain Johnstone and David Trouton	
2003	The Breathing House by Peter Arnott, Royal Lyceum Theatre Company, Edinburgh	Sweet Charity at the Crucible Theatre, Sheffield	Tom's Midnight Garden by Library Theatre Company, Manchester	
2002	Gagarin Way Traverse Theatre Company in association with the National Theatre Studio on tour	Fiddler On The Roof a Watermill West Berkshire Playhouse production	Lifeboat by Nicola McCartney, Catherine Wheels Theatre Company in association with Brunton Theatre, Musselburgh on tour	
2001	Splendour in association with the Peter Wolff Theatre Trust on tour	The Gondoliers at The Watermill West Berkshire Playhouse	The Unicorn Theatre's Tom's Midnight Garden	
2000	Larkin With Women at the Stephen Joseph Theatre, Scarborough	Anonymous Society produced by Start at the Lyric Theatre, Hammersmith	Under The Apple Tree devised by Paul Harman, Philip Harrison and David Tarkenter for ctc on tour	
1999	The Palace Theatre Watford production of The Late Middle Classes subsequently toured nationally by the Ambassador Theatre Group	Birmingham Repertory Theatre and Tamasha Theatre Company's Fourteen Songs, Two Weddings And A Funeral at Birmingham Repertory Theatre	The Young Vic Theatre Company's Arabian Nights at the Young Vic and on tour, in association with Warwick Arts Centre and Darren Ockert Productions	
1998	Frozen by Bryony Lavery at the Birmingham Repertory Theatre	Spend Spend Spend! at West Yorkshire Playhouse	Oxford Stage Company's Junk	
1997	Popcorn by Ben Elton, a co-production between Nottingham Playhouse and West Yorkshire Playhouse	Divorce Me Darling book, music and lyrics by Sandy Wilson at Chichester Festival Theatre	Beauty And The Beast at the Young Vic, London	
1996	Divine Right by Peter Whelan at the Birmingham Repertory Theatre	By Jeeves at the Stephen Joseph Theatre, Scarborough	Peter Pan at West Yorkshire Playhouse	
1995	Trainspotting by Irvine Welsh, adapted by Harry Gibson, at the Citizens Theatre, Glasgow	Moll Flanders at the Theatre Royal, York	The Red Balloon at the Birmingham Repertory Theatre	
1994	Hated Nightfall by Howard Barker, co-produced by the Royal Court and the Wrestling School, on tour	Assassins at the Library Theatre, Manchester	Two Weeks With The Queen coproduced by the Royal National Theatre and the Stephen Joseph Theatre in the Round, Scarborough	
1993	Lost In Yonkers presented by Duncan C Weldon, on tour	Me And My Girl a Richard Armitage/Noel Gay Organisation production presented by Pola Jones and Farworlds Ltd, on tour	The Royal National Theatre's production of Mr A's Amazing Maze Plays	
1992	The Choice at Salisbury Playhouse	Into The Woods at the Wolsey Theatre, Ipswich	The Magic Storybook by Renata Allen, Oxford Stage Company and Oxford Playhouse	
1991	Donny Boy at Manchester Royal Exchange	Sweeney Todd at Oldham Coliseum	Monty Moonbeam's Magnificent Mission at the Swan Theatre, Worcester	

== Past winning performers ==
Year	Best Performance in a Play	Best Performance in a Musical	Best Supporting Performance in a Play	Best Supporting Performance in a Musical
2023	Daniel Rigby for Accidental Death Of An Anarchist, a Sheffield Theatres and Lyric Hammersmith Theatre co-production in association with Playful Productions	Lena Hall for In Dreams, a Leeds Playhouse production	Antony Eden for Family Album, a Stephen Joseph Theatre production	
2022	Giles Terera for The Meaning of Zong, a Bristol Old Vic Production	Divina de Campo for Hedwig and the Angry Inch a Leeds Playhouse and HOME co-production	Nishla Smith for Kes an Octagon Theatre and Theatre By The Lake co-production	
2019	Hiran Abeysekera for Life Of Pi a Sheffield Theatres production	Rebecca Trehearn for Sweet Charity a Nottingham Playhouse production	Esh Alladi for Hobson’s Choice a Royal Exchange Theatre, Manchester production	
2018	Denise Black for The Cherry Orchard a Sherman Theatre production	Ashley Zhangazha for Guys And Dolls a Royal Exchange Theatre and Talawa Theatre Company co-production	Gemma Dobson for Rita, Sue And Bob Too a Royal Court, Out of Joint and Octagon Theatre, Bolton production	
2017	Joseph Millson for The Rover a Royal Shakespeare Company production	John McCrea for Everybody's Talking About Jamie a Sheffield Theatres production	Sharon Duncan-Brewster for A Streetcar Named Desire a Royal Exchange Theatre production	
2016	Paapa Essiedu for Hamlet, a Royal Shakespeare Company production	Clare Burt for Flowers for Mrs Harris, a Sheffield Theatres Production	Rebecca Trehearn for Show Boat, a Sheffield Theatres production	
2015	Joel MacCormack for Each His Own Wilderness, an Orange Tree Theatre production Polly Lister for Abigail's Party, a Theatre by the Lake production	Imelda Staunton for Gypsy, a Chichester Festival Theatre production	Justine Mitchell for For Services Rendered, a Chichester Festival Theatre production	
2014	Patrick O'Kane for Quietly, an Abbey Theatre production on tour	Jamie Parker for Guys and Dolls, a Chichester Festival Theatre production	Jenna Augen for Bad Jews, a Theatre Royal Bath production, in the Ustinov Studio	
2013	Cush Jumbo for A Doll's House, a Royal Exchange Theatre, Manchester production	Janie Dee for Hello Dolly!, a Curve, Leicester production	Siân Phillips for This Is My Family, a Sheffield Theatres production	
2012	Henry Goodman for The Resistible Rise of Arturo Ui, a Chichester Festival Theatre production	Imelda Staunton for Sweeney Todd, a Chichester Festival Theatre production	Aidan McArdle for Democracy, a Sheffield Theatres production	
2011	Derek Jacobi for King Lear: a Donmar Warehouse production at the Grand Opera House, Belfast and on tour	Bertie Carvel for Matilda at the Courtyard Theatre, Stratford-upon-Avon	Claire Price for The Pride, a Sheffield Theatres production	
2010	Maggie Steed for Hay Fever at West Yorkshire Playhouse – a West Yorkshire Playhouse production	Ensemble: The Hired Man - an Octagon Theatre Bolton production	Ayesha Antoine for My Wonderful Day at the Stephen Joseph Theatre, Scarborough – a Stephen Joseph Theatre, Scarborough production	Louise Plowright for Irving Berlin's White Christmas the Musical - A Michael Rose Limited, Chris Moreno & Mayflower Theatre, Southampton presentation of a Theatre Royal Plymouth Production
2009	Anna Francolini for The Prime of Miss Jean Brodie at Royal & Derngate Northampton	Alexandra Silber for Carousel, Stanhope Productions, Michael Edwards & Carole Winter, Tiger/WSZ, Stevens-O'Boyle, and Tulchin/Bartner/Ambassador Theatre Group in association with The Churchill, Bromley on tour	Claire Price for Mary Stuart at Clwyd Theatr Cymru	Kirsty Hoiles for Spend Spend Spend at the Watermill, Newbury
2008	Brenda Blethyn for the Royal Exchange Theatre Company's The Glass Menagerie	Brian Conley for The Music Man at Chichester Festival Theatre	Kate O'Flynn for the Royal Exchange Theatre Company's The Children's Hour	Martin Ball for Mary Poppins on tour
2007	Patrick Stewart for Macbeth at Chichester Festival Theatre produced in association with Duncan C Weldon and Paul Elliot	Henry Goodman for Sheffield Theatres' Fiddler On The Roof at the Crucible	Meg Fraser for All My Sons at the Royal Lyceum, Edinburgh	Anne Louise Ross for Sunshine On Leith at Dundee Rep
2006	Greg Hicks for Tamburlaine at Bristol Old Vic	Junix Inocian for Pacific Overtures at the Haymarket Theatre, Leicester	Tom Brooke for The Long And The Short And The Tall at the Lyceum, Sheffield	Nicole Faraday for Bad Girls: The Musical at West Yorkshire Playhouse
2005	Ian McDiarmid for Lear at the Crucible, Sheffield	Anna-Jane Casey for Mack And Mabel at the Watermill	Jimmy Akingbola for Blue/Orange at the Crucible, Sheffield	Mark Tracie Bennett for the Royal Exchange Theatre Company's Sex, Chips & Rock N Roll

== Past winning creatives ==
Year	Best Director	Best Set Design / Best Design	Best Lighting Design	Special Award for Individual Achievement	Special Award for Achievement in Regional Theatre
2023	Garry Hynes for Druid O’Casey, a Druid Theatre production at Lyric Theatre Belfast	Sadeysa Greenaway-Bailey & ULTZ for Tambo & Bones, a Theatre Royal Stratford East, and Actors Touring Company co-production		n/a	n/a
2022	Robert Hastie, Anthony Lau, Elin Schofield for Rock/Paper/Scissors	Laura Hopkins for Dracula: The Untold Story, Projection and Video Design by Simon Wainwright at Leeds Playhouse		n/a	n/a
2019	Max Webster for Life Of Pi a Sheffield Theatres production	Nick Barnes, Finn Caldwell, Carolyn Downing, Andrzej Goulding, Tim Hatley and Tim Lutkin for Life Of Pi a Sheffield Theatres production		n/a	n/a
2018	Sarah Frankcom for Our Town a Royal Exchange Theatre production	Morgan Large for Wonderland a Nottingham Playhouse Theatre Company production		n/a	n/a
2017	Gemma Bodinetz at Liverpool Everyman and Playhouse new repertory season	Jon Bausor for The Grinning Man at Bristol Old Vic		n/a	n/a
2016	Raz Shaw for Wit, a Royal Exchange Theatre production	Lez Brotherston for Flowers for Mrs Harris and Show Boat, a Sheffield Theatres productions			
2015	Ned Bennett for Pomona, an Orange Tree Theatre production and for YEN a Royal Exchange Theatre production	Dick Bird, Timothy Bird and Paul Keogan for The Hudsucker Proxy, a Nuffield Theatre, Liverpool Everyman and Playhouse in association with Complicité production			
2014	Duncan Macmillan and Robert Icke for 1984, a Headlong, Nottingham Playhouse and Almeida Theatre production	Jon Bausor for Mametz, a National Theatre Wales production			
2013	Blanche McIntyre for The Seagull, a Headlong and Nuffield, Southampton production in association with Derby Theatre	Jonathan Fensom and Charles Balfour for The Accrington Pals, a Royal Exchange Theatre, Manchester production		Simon Callow	
2012	Garry Hynes for Druidmurphy, produced by Druid Theatre Company	Amanda Stoodley for Manchester Lines a Library Theatre Company production			
2011	Michael Sheen and Bill Mitchell for The Passion a National Theatre Wales/Wild Works co-production	Lizzie Clachan for Happy Days lighting design by Natasha Chivers a Sheffield Theatres production			
2010	Laurie Sansom for Beyond the Horizon and Spring Storm - Royal & Derngate, Northampton productions	Mike Brookes and Simon Banham for The Persians - a National Theatre Wales production	Chris Davey for Dial M for Murder – a West Yorkshire Playhouse and Fiery Angel production and for Beyond the Horizon – a Royal & Derngate, Northampton production	Max Stafford-Clark	Paines Plough
2009	Scott Graham and Steven Hoggett for Othello, Frantic Assembly and Theatre Royal Plymouth in collaboration with Royal and Derngate, Northampton on tour	Michael Pavelka for The Merchant of Venice, Watermill Theatre and Propellor on tour	Daniella Beattie for The Wicked Lady at New Victoria. Newcastle Under Lyme	Nicolas Kent	The Theatre, Chipping Norton
2008	Michael Boyd for The Histories at RSC Stratford-Upon-Avon	Mike Britton for Lady From The Sea at Birmingham Rep	The Royal Exchange Theatre Company's The Children's Hour designed by Mick Hughes	Bill Kenwright	Latitude Festival
2007	Tim Supple for A Midsummer Night's Dream on tour	Chloe Lamford for Small Miracle at the Mercury, Colchester		Matthew Bourne	Bruntwood Group - for their year round charitable work and key contributions off stage
2006	Nina Raine for Unprotected at the Everyman Theatre, Liverpool	Robert Innes Hopkins for Promise, Promises at the Crucible, Sheffield		Thelma Holt	English Youth Ballet
2005	Michael Grandage for Don Carlos at the Crucible, Sheffield	Faustus set design by Laura Hopkins at Northampton Theatre Royal			The Mackintosh Foundation
2004	Anna Mackmin for Cloud Nine a Sheffield Theatres production at the Crucible	Liz Ascroft for the Royal Exchange Theatre Company's The Rise And Fall Of Little Voice			The Playhouse Theatre, Derry
2003	David Farr for A Midsummer Night's Dream at Bristol Old Vic	Julian Croch, Phil Eddols, Colin Grenfell and Stephen Snell for The Hanging Man, Improbable Theatre in co-production wit West Yorkshire Playhouse, Wexner Center for the Arts, the Walker Art Center, the Lyric Hammersmith and Weiner Festwochen in association with Pomegrante Arts			The Georgian Theatre Royal, Richmond, North Yorkshire
2002	Emma Rice for Kneehigh Theatre's The Red Shoes on tour	Simon Higlett for Elizabeth Rex at Birmingham Repertory Theatre produced in association with Duncan C. Weldon and Paul Elliott for Triumph Entertainment Ltd, and for Nuffield Theatre Southampton's Three Sisters presented by Theatre Royal Bath Productions on tour			mindthe gap
2001	Vicky Featherstone for Splendour, Paines Plough in association with the Peter Wolff Theatre Trust on tour	Laura Hopkins for Mister Heracles at West Yorkshire Playhouse			The Wales Association for the Performing Arts
2000	Richard Wilson for Mr Kolpert at the Jerwood Theatre Upstairs, Royal Court	Jeremy Herbert for 4.48 Psychosis at the Jerwood Theatre Upstairs, Royal Court			Mercury Theatre, Colchester
1999	Edward Hall for Twelfth Night at The Watermill, West Berkshire Playhouse	Es Devlin for the Bush Theatre's Howie The Rookie at the Bush Theatre			Northern Stage
1998	Julian Crouch and Phelim McDermott for Shockheaded Peter, a Cultural Industry project produced in collaboration with West Yorkshire Playhouse and Lyric Theatre Hammersmith	Neil Warmington for Jane Eyre, Shared Experience Theatre in association with the Wolsey Theatre Ipswich and the Young Vic Theatre on tour			Mobil Touring Theatre
1997	Janet Suzman for The Cherry Orchard, the Birmingham Repertory Theatre Company in a co-production with the Market Theatre, Johannesburg	Robert Innes Hopkins for The Wasp Factory at West Yorkshire Playhouse and Oxford Stage Company's My Mother Said I Never Should on tour			G & J Productions
1996	Mike Alfreds for Flesh And Blood, Jude The Obscure and Private Lives, Method & Madness on tour	Tony Tripp for Cole Porter's High Society presented by Paul Elliott by arrangement with Paul Dainty Europe Ltd. Sheffield Theatres and Warner Chappell Music Ltd, on tour			Jeremy Raison, artistic director of Chester Gateway
1995	Barrie Rutter for The Cracked Pot at West Yorkshire Playhouse in association with Northern Broadsides, and for Northern Broadsides' tour of A Midsummer Night's Dream	Robin Don for The Winter Guest at West Yorkshire Playhouse, co-produced with the Almeida Theatre Company			
1994	Anthony Clark for The Atheist's Tragedy and The Playboy Of The Western World at the Birmingham Repertory Theatre	Peter J. Davison for the tours of the Almeida Theatre's production of Medea in association with Bill Kenwright Ltd and Theatr Clwyd's production of Saint Joan presented by Duncan C. Weldon			
1993	David Glass for the David Glass ensemble production of Gormenghast, on tour	Charles Cusick-Smith for The Plough And The Stars at the Haymarket Theatre, Leicester			
1992	Gregory Hersov for Romeo and Juliet and A View From The Bridge at Manchester Royal Exchange	Neil Warmington (set), Ben Ormerod (lighting) and Mic Pool (sound) for Life Is A Dream at West Yorkshire Playhouse			
1991	Patrick Sandford for The Winter Wife and Much Ado About Nothing at the Nuffield Theatre, Southampton	Simon Vincenzi for Therese Raquin at Nottingham Playhouse			

== Past winning achievements in dance and opera ==
Year	Achievement in Dance	Achievement in Opera
2023	Scottish Ballet for Coppélia	Opera North for Orpheus
2022	The dancers of Rambert	Richard Mantle for the last year at Opera North
2019	Scottish Ballet for the world premiere of Helen Pickett’s dance-theatre adaptation of The Crucible	Buxton International Festival at Buxton Opera House for the world premiere of Georgiana
2018	Northern Ballet for its programming, particularly The Little Mermaid and its Kenneth MacMillan tribute	David Pountney and Tomas Hanus for their artistic leadership of Welsh National Opera
2017	Scottish Ballet for the European premiere of Crystal Pite's one-act ballet Emergence	Scottish Opera for Pelléas And Mélisande
2016	Gary Clarke for Coal	The Royal Opera and Guildhall School Of Music and Drama for 4.48 Psychosis in association with the Lyric Hammersmith
2015	Candoco Dance Company for the revival of Jérôme Bel’s postmodern classic The Show Must Go On	Glyndebourne for an outstandingly well planned and performed season
2014	Birmingham Hippodrome and DanceXchange for the International Dance Festival 2014	Richard Farnes for his exceptional conducting of Opera North’s Death in Venice
2013	Independent dance artist Wendy Houstoun for her insightful, funny solo 50 Acts	Welsh National Opera for the productions of Lulu & Lohengrin, conducted by Lothar Koenigs
2012	Akram Khan for Desh	Christopher Alden’s production of Norma for Opera North, a co-production with Theater Chemnitz
2011	New Adventures for an outstanding revision of Matthew Bourne’s Cinderella	Music Theatre Wales for its production of Mark-Anthony Turnage's Greek
2010	The Mark Morris Dance Group for L'allegro, Il Pensero Ed Il Moderato	Welsh National Opera's production of Die Meistersinger von Nürnberg
2009	The dancers of English National Ballet, who showed new strength and interpretative skills across a range of repertory	Glyndebourne for an outstanding 75th Anniversary season
2008	Theatre-Rites & Arthur Pita for Mischief	Opera North for its summer Shakespeare season
2007	Birmingham Royal Ballet's Stravinsky! A Celebration 2007	Opera North's Peter Grimes
2006	Les Ballets Trockadero De Monte Carlo for their hilarious blend of low comedy and high glamour that lampoons and celebrates the golden age of classical ballet	Welsh National Opera's Mazeppa
2005	Mark Baldwin for the creation of Constant Speed and the high calibre of his artistic directorship of Rambert Dance Company	The Partnership of Vladimir Jurowski and Richard Jones for Welsh National Operas Wozzeck
2004	Scottish Ballet for sure-footed modernisation under Ashley Page and dynamic performances	Opera North for its Eight Little Greats season at Leeds and on tour
2003	George Piper Dances' Critics' Choice ****** programme	Tristan und Isolde at Glyndebourne
2002	Christopher Hampson for Double Concerto, an outstanding new ballet in a fine year for repertory at English National Ballet	Scottish Opera for Die Walküre and Siegfried
2001	Rambert Dance Company for their performance of Mats Ek's She Was Black	Richard Jones, Vladimir Jurowski and the company for Welsh National Opera's production of The Queen of Spades
2000	Tamara Rojo for her outstanding performances for English National Ballet	Anja Silja, Amanda Roocroft and Jir Belohlvek for leading Glyndebourne's revival of Jenufa
1999	Lez Brotherston for Northern Ballet Theatre's Carmen, The Hunchback Of Notre Dame, Giselle, Dracula and A Christmas Carol	Scottish Opera, especially for its outstanding productions of Der Rosenkavalier and Macbeth
1998	David Bintley for the choreography of Edward II, for mounting the Balanchine bill and for reviving Dame Ninette de Valois' The Prospect Before Us for Birmingham Royal Ballet	Welsh National Opera for Billy Budd and The Coronation of Poppea
1997	The dancers of Rambert Dance Company for their performances in Airs, Eidolon, Port For Angels and Stream	The cast and production of Scottish Opera's Idomeneo

== Other award categories ==
Other awards and recent winners include:

- UK's Most Welcoming Theatre: The Mill at Sonning (2018), Storyhouse, Chester (2019), Leeds Playhouse (2022), Nottingham Playhouse (2023)
- Promotion of Diversity/Excellence in Inclusivity: Birmingham Repertory Theatre (2018), Mercury Theatre (2019), English Touring Theatre (2022), Capital Theatres (2023)
- Workforce Award: Northern Stage (2019), The Marlowe (2022), Ambassador Theatre Group (2023)
- Excellence in Arts Education: Derby Theatre (2019), Lyric Theatre, Belfast (2022), Blackpool Grand Theatre (2023)

== See also ==
- Theatre of the United Kingdom
