= Voices Made Night =

First edition (publ. Caminho)

Voices Made Night (Vozes Anoitecidas in the original Portuguese) is a collection of short stories by the Mozambican author Mia Couto. The stories were first published in Mozambique in 1986 and later picked up by the Portuguese publishing house Caminho and released in Lisbon, in 1987. Written at the height of the Mozambican Civil War, Couto's stories, which oscillate between the fantastic and the cruelly realistic, are both a painful depiction of a country that has been laid to waste and a celebration of the power of the imagination to transcend the limits of reality. Translated by David Brookshaw, Voices Made Night was published in English in by Heinemann.

In 2001, South African physical theatre company Magnet Theatre adapted Voices Made Night for the stage.
