= UK Theatre =

- Formation: 1894; 132 years ago
- Type: Non-profit trade organization
- Website: uktheatre.org
- Formerly called: Theatrical Managers Association

UK Theatre is a British non-profit trade organisation representing theatre producers, managers, owners and operators in the United Kingdom. It partners and shares an office with the Society of London Theatre, its sister organisation.

The organisation was founded in 1894 as the Theatrical Managers Association, with Sir Henry Irving as its first president. There are however records of the activity of a Theatrical Managers Association going back to at least 1866. Irving was still president in 1901.

The current Joint Presidents of UK Theatre are Jon Gilchrist and Stephanie Sirr MBE.

== UK Theatre Awards ==
The association presented the TMA Awards annually since 1991, which subsequently became the UK Theatre Awards in 2011. The UK Theatre Awards are a nationwide annual celebration of the outstanding achievements of theatre across the UK.

== See also ==
- English drama
- Theatre of the United Kingdom
- West End theatre
