= Ben Rice (author) =

British author (born 1972)

Ben Rice is a British author born in Tiverton, Devon in 1972.

After attending Blundell's School in the town of his birth, Rice studied English literature at the universities of Newcastle upon Tyne and Oxford. He then undertook a creative writing course leading to the degree of Master of Arts at the University of East Anglia.

His debut novella, Pobby and Dingan (later filmed as Opal Dream) was awarded the Somerset Maugham Award in 2001 (as well as being shortlisted for the John Llewellyn Rhys Prize), and in 2003 Granta named him as one of their twenty "Best of Young British Novelists". Pobby and Dingan was described by Jeff Giles of The New York Times Book Review as ' ... an enormously touching, imaginative and unexpected novel that ... glows in your hands.'

He currently lives in Sydney, Australia and teaches English at Marcellin College Randwick.

== Bibliography ==
- "Pobby and Dingan". Granta. 70: 133–180. Summer 2000.
- Pobby and Dingan. London: Jonathan Cape. 2000.

== Sources ==
- Granta Magazine author profile
