= Theatre for Early Years =

Theatrical events for young children

Theatre for Early Years or TEY is a blanket term for theatrical events designed for audiences of pre-school children (aged under five or six years of age). TEY is considered to be a sub-category of Theatre for Young Audiences (TYA). TEY is known in the US as Theatre for the Very Young, or TVY.

It has been defined as "professional theatre led by adults performing for an audience of babies from months old to toddlers approximately one and a half to two years old accompanied by a parent or adult companion. Babies usually sit on their caregiver's lap or in a stroller, and watch a play - usually between 30 and 45 minutes long - designed especially for them". In addition, performances for newborns, centring on bonding and attachment, and more participatory productions which invite children to enter the performance area for a time have become common. Even productions aimed at foetuses and expectant mothers have been created.

== History ==
TEY arguably emerged in 1978 with the work of two London-based companies, Theatre Kit and Oily Cart. Chris Speyer, founder of radical children's theatre company Theatre Kit, described the epiphany which led to the earliest experiments in TEY:

The move into under fives theatre was prompted by an occasion when we took [Speyer's wife] Katherine [Ukleja]'s niece Annie, then aged three, to see a performance of one of our shows for children. Finding that various aspects of the show frightened Annie, Katherine decided that we should develop a form of theatre tailored to the needs, interests and concentration spans of under fives.

Several members of Theatre Kit went on to make Oily Cart's Exploding Punch & Judy in 1981, and Oily Cart have gone on to produce at least one show a year for under-fives, although it was not until 2002 that they began making work for the youngest audiences (six months to two years), with Jumpin' Beans. In 1987, the first performance for newborns, Joëlle Rouland's L'oiseau serein [The Serene Bird], was presented in France, at the same time as Italy's La Baracca – Testoni Ragazzi began their career with Acqua [Water]. La Baracca's founders, Roberto and Valeria Frabetti, were invited by staff at a Bologna nido [creche] to develop a workshop, and later a performance, for their children aged from 3 months to 5 years. This project, which became Acqua, has a claim to be the first non-English production staged for this age group (specifically, a target age of two to four years). Over the following 25 years, La Baracca has been at the forefront of research and creation of theatre experiences for ever younger audiences, with almost thirty different plays now produced for the under-fives.

=== Notable companies ===
Notable theatre companies now producing TEY performances include:

- Polka Theatre
- Magnet Theatre (South Africa)
- Children's Theatre Company and Alliance Theatre for the Very Young (United States)

==== Other organisations ====
There are also several organisations and campaigning groups whose influence has been key to the growth of TEY, especially ASSITEJ (the international organisation for the promotion and research of theatre for children and young people), the EU Programme of Culture 2000 Glitterbird Project and the Small Size network.

== Forms of Theatre for Early Years ==
Almost all mainstream performance art forms have been adapted for Early Years audiences, including theatre, dance, opera, musical theatre, classical music, art installations and puppetry. In theatrical productions, forms vary widely. Fairy tales, picture books and traditional children's literature have all provided inspiration for narrative productions, as have commercial TV and film franchises, such as Sesame Street and Disney on Ice. Other productions create original stories or use more abstract, postdramatic forms. Francoise Gerbaulet, French theatre maker, has noted "I am always deeply surprised by the seriousness of infant spectators. Babies do not understand, they absorb, the sound of voices, the music of words, anxiety, fear, grief, violence, love, they absorb them all... Babies are ideal spectators".

== Techniques associated with Theatre for Early Years ==
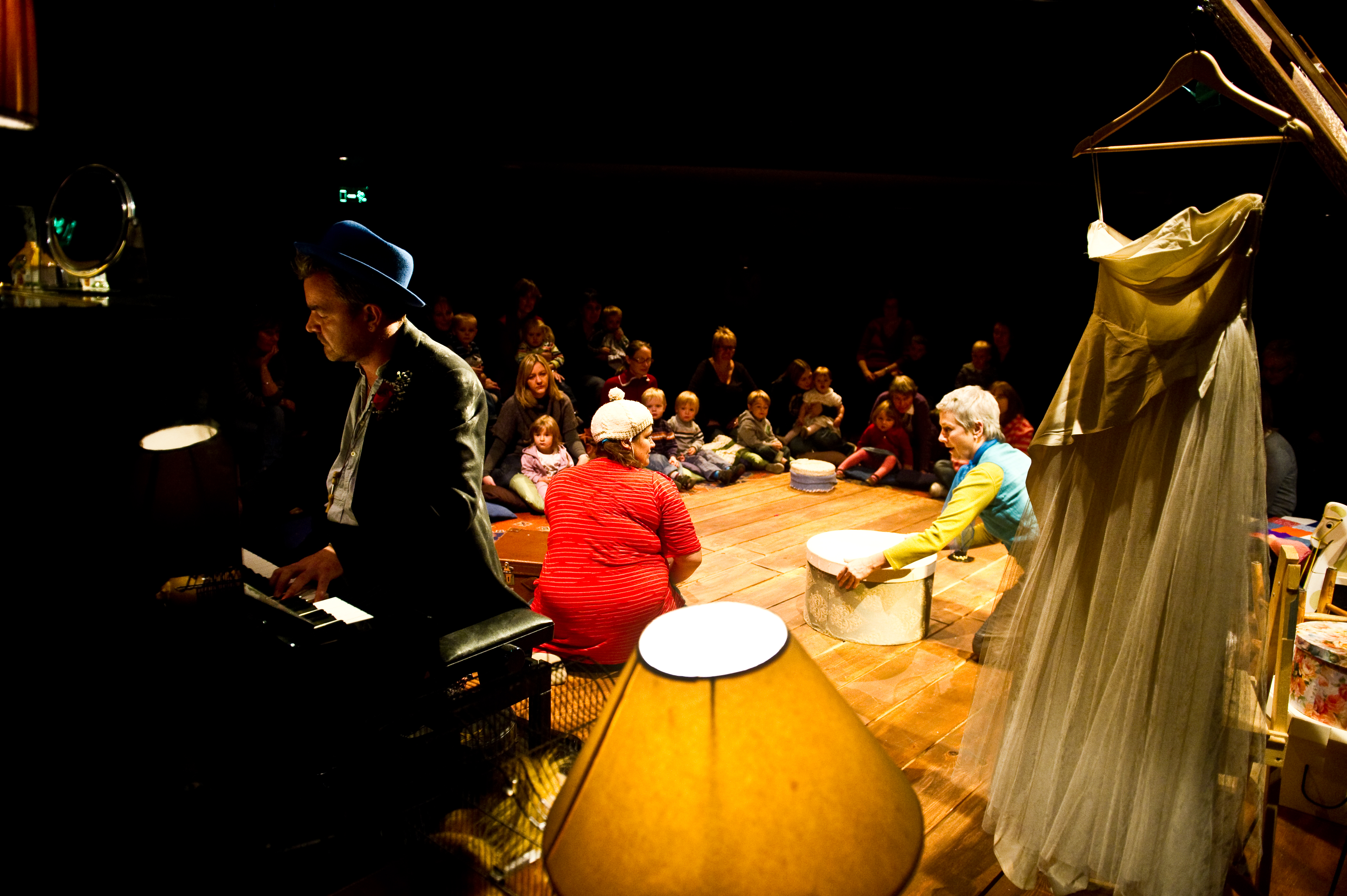
"The Attic", 2010. Produced by Starcatchers, Scotland.

Despite occasional productions derived wholly from the suggestions of very young children, TEY tends to be created by adults and never features professional baby performers, although in the UK this is technically allowable under the UK Government's The Children (Performances) Regulations 1968. The presence of chaperones is universal, due to the obvious ethical impossibility of separating a very young child from all caregivers. Productions tend to be intimate in scale, with small audiences. There is often no fourth wall in TEY, as actors are communicating with spectators throughout. Multisensory experiences use sound, light, touch, smell and taste to engage with their audiences. The needs of the very young, including feeding, sleep and going to the toilet, are carefully considered by TEY practitioners. TEY can be defined by its purposeful design, with experiences carefully crafted especially for babies and their adult companions; this may mean attending to practical issues such as seating layout and minimising blackouts, employing knowledge from developmental psychology, neuroscience and cognitive science to tailor productions to the capabilities of a tightly prescribed audience (such as the pre-verbal but mobile stage between 12 and 18 months).

== See also ==
- Theatre in Education
- Theatre pedagogy
- White (play)
