= Pobby and Dingan =

2000 novella by Ben Rice

- First UK edition
- Author: Ben Rice
- Cover artist: Rob Clifford
- Language: English
- Publisher: Jonathan Cape (UK); Knopf (US)
- Publication date: 2000
- Publication place: United Kingdom
- Pages: 96
- ISBN: 0-2240-6110-0

Pobby and Dingan is a novella by English author Ben Rice, which first appeared in issue 70 of Granta in Summer 2000 and published in book form later that year. It was joint winner of the 2001 Somerset Maugham Award and shortlisted for the John Llewellyn Rhys Prize. It has been made into the 2006 film Opal Dream, a 2010 play for children by Catherine Wheels Theatre Company and a 2012 play The Mysterious Vanishment Of Pobby & Dingan for Bristol theatre company Travelling Light.

== Plot introduction ==
Set in the opal mining community of Lightning Ridge in New South Wales it tells of the eponymous Pobby and Dingan, imaginary friends of Kellyanne Williamson, sister of Ashmol and daughter of an opal miner. One day Pobby and Dingan 'disappear' leaving Kellyanne bereft. At first Ashmol tells Kellyanne to just snap out of it but as her condition deteriorates and she stops eating, Ashmol resolves to find her lost friends...

== Reception ==
According to the complete review reviews were "generally very positive, with some extremely impressed".

Jeff Giles in the New York Times Book Review is full in his praise "Pobby and Dingan is an enormously touching, imaginative and unexpected novel that just glows in your hands ... What's so extraordinary about Rice's novel is how unpredictable it is, how effortlessly it mingles whimsy and gravitas, how its plot races ahead long after you figured it would run out of gas."

Lydia Millet in The Washington Post writes "At once delicate and down-to-earth, melancholy and coarse, Pobby and Dingan is a disarmingly modest and carefully rendered debut ... Don't let the slimness of the volume dissuade you; the story has a quiet strength that makes it memorable."

Robert McCrum in The Observer writes "Every character in this pocket masterpiece is speaking Australian with a vengeance. The way in which the rhythms of everyday speech are used to narrate this spellbinding and suggestive fable is just one of its exceptional qualities."
