= ASSITEJ =

ASSITEJ, the International Association of Theatre for Children and Young People, (French: Association Internationale du Théâtre de l’Enfance et la Jeunesse) was established in 1965 as an international alliance of professionals involved in theatre for children and young people. There are 83 national centres globally. The President of ASSITEJ International is Sue Giles.

ASSITEJ International facilitates worldwide access and the exchange of ideas and cultural traditions for professionals involved in theatre for children and young people.

The ASSITEJ World Congresses have been held in Cape Town, Tokyo, Warsaw, Prague, Lyon, Madrid, Adelaide, Seoul, Rostov on Don, Tromsø, Albany, etc.

ASSITEJ International is affiliated with several professional networks, including the International Inclusive Arts Network (IIAN), Small Size Network, and the International Theatre for Young Audiences Research Network (ITYARN).
