= Edinburgh Fringe First Awards =

Annual theatre award at the Edinburgh Festival Fringe

Scotsman Fringe First Awards
- Description: Outstanding new writing premiered at the Edinburgh Festival Fringe
- Location: Edinburgh
- Country: Scotland
- Presented by: The Scotsman
- Established: 1973

The Scotsman Fringe First Awards, often called the Fringe Firsts, are theatre awards presented by The Scotsman for new writing premiered at the Edinburgh Festival Fringe. Established in 1973, the awards are presented in several rounds across the festival rather than as a single annual prize.

== History ==
The Fringe First Awards were introduced in 1973 to encourage and recognise new writing at the Edinburgh Festival Fringe. The awards were created in response to concern that new plays formed only a small part of the Fringe programme. Owen Dudley Edwards states that 45 new plays were presented at the 1972 Fringe, and that the Fringe Board arranged for The Scotsman to offer awards for new work from 1973.

Allen Wright (journalist), arts editor of The Scotsman and closely associated with the awards, later described new work as central to the character of the Fringe, but difficult to sell because of its uncertainty. Writing in 1987, he stated that the number of new plays at the Fringe had increased from 45 in 1972 to 138 in 1977, and that in some later years more than 300 productions were eligible for Fringe Firsts.

The Edinburgh Festival Fringe Society's retrospective material also dates the awards to 1973 and credits Wright with establishing them for original works of theatre.

== Format and eligibility ==
The Edinburgh Festival Fringe Society describes the Fringe First Awards as awards for new writing, judged by critics from The Scotsman. The awards are presented weekly during the Fringe, and productions cannot be entered directly.

Current eligibility rules require a production to be new, premiered in Edinburgh, and staged for at least eight days. Eligible works must contain drama, with a significant element of narrative or character exploration. Abstract dance and movement-based work is not eligible.

== Criticism and scope ==
The awards' focus on new writing has been criticised by practitioners of physical and visual theatre. Total Theatre Magazine described a 1988 dispute in which mime companies challenged their exclusion from Fringe First eligibility. According to the magazine, Wright replied that "the encouragement of new writing remained our principal objective".

Writing in Critical Stages in 2024, Dermot Daly argued that the awards reflected the choices and biases of reviewers. He noted that a production first had to interest one Scotsman critic before being seen by two further critics and discussed for a possible award.

== Sponsorship ==
In 2024 the awards were jointly sponsored by Edinburgh Napier University and Queen Margaret University. In 2025 they were sponsored by Queen Margaret University and Stagecoach.

== Winners by year ==
=== 2015 ===
Work	Writer(s)	Company
The Christians		Gate Theatre
A Gambler's Guide to Dying		Gary McNair
Going Viral	Daniel Bye	Dan Bye
The History of the World Through Banalities		Kopergietery
Jennifer Tremblay Trilogy Part III – The Deliverance		Stellar Quines Theatre Company
Swallow		Traverse Theatre Company
Underneath		Fishamble
Citizen Puppet		Blind Summit Theatre
The Great Downhill Journey of Little Tommy		Theater aan Zee & Richard Jordan
Labels	Joe Sellman-Leava	Worklight Theatre
Light Boxes		Grid Iron
Raz		Assembly Festival and Riverside Studios
Tar Baby		Desiree Burch and Platt Productions
Trans Scripts		Paul Lucas Productions
A Girl Is a Half-Formed Thing		Corn Exchange, Dublin
Our Ladies of Perpetual Succour		NTS & Live Theatre, Newcastle
Penny Arcade: Longing Lasts Longer		Penny Arcade
A Reason to Talk		KunstZ, Big in Belgium and Richard Jordan
What I Learned from Johnny Bevan		Luke Wright

=== 2016 ===
Work	Writer(s)	Company
Angel	Henry Naylor	Pipeline Productions
Counting Sheep		Lemon Bucket Orkestra in association with Aurora Nova
Expensive Shit	Adura Onashile	Scottish Theatre Producers in association with Traverse Theatre
Heads Up		Kieran Hurley with Show And Tell
The Interference		Pepperdine University (USA)
World Without Us		Ontroerend Goed, Theatre Royal Plymouth, Vooruit, Richard Jordan Productions, Summerhall
Daffodils (A Play With Songs)		Bullet Heart Club
Fabric		Robin Rayner, TREMers & The Marlowe Theatre
Faslane		Jenna Watt in association with Showroom and Contact
Mark Thomas: The Red Shed		Lakin McCarthy in association with West Yorkshire Playhouse
Tank		Breach
Two Man Show		RashDash
Us / Them		BRONKS, Big in Belgium, Richard Jordan, Theatre Royal Plymouth
One Hundred Homes		Yinka Kuitenbrouwer, Big in Belgium, Richard Jordan, Theatre Royal Plymouth
Letters to Windsor House		Sh!t Theatre with Show and Tell
JOAN		Milk Presents, in association with Derby Theatre and Underbelly Untapped
Growth		Paines Plough
The Duke		Hoipolloi, PBJ Management, Theatre Royal Plymouth with Save The Children
Scorch		Prime Cut Productions

=== 2017 ===
Work	Writer(s)	Company
Nassim		Bush Theatre
Flesh and Bone		Unpolished Theatre
Letters to Morrissey		Traverse Theatre in association with Tron Theatre
Enterprise		Americana Absurdum Productions
The Believers Are But Brothers	Javaad Alipoor	Javaad Alipoor
A Super Happy Story (About Feeling Super Sad)		Silent Uproar in association with LittleMighty
The Shape of the Pain		China Plate, Rachel Bagshaw and Chris Thorpe
How to Act		National Theatre of Scotland
Borders	Henry Naylor	Gilded Balloon and RedBeard Theatre
£¥€$ (LIES)		Big in Belgium, Theatre Royal Plymouth, Vooruit, Richard Jordan Productions
Adam		National Theatre of Scotland
Education, Education, Education		The Wardrobe Ensemble
Fag/Stag		Underbelly and The Last Great Hunt
Foreign Radical		Theatre Conspiracy with Aurora Nova
(More) Moira Monologues		Kyle / Bissett Productions
Old Stock: A Refugee Love Story		2b theatre company with Aurora Nova
Stand By		Utter

=== 2018 ===
Work	Writer(s)	Company
Angry Alan	Penelope Skinner	Francesca Moody with Underbelly
The Basement Tapes	Stella Reid, Jane Yonge, Thomas Lambert and Oliver Morse	Zanetti Productions
Class	Iseult Golden and David Horan	Abbey Theatre, Dublin
First Snow/Premiere Neige	Davey Anderson, Philippe Ducros and Linda McLean	National Theatre of Scotland, Theatre PÀP and Hotel-Motel
Status	Chris Thorpe	Chris Thorpe, Rachel Chavkin, China Plate and Staatstheater Mainz
Ulster American	David Ireland (playwright)	Traverse Theatre
What Girls Are Made Of	Cora Bissett	Traverse Theatre Company and Raw Material with Regular Music
Dressed	Josie Dale-Jones, Lydia Higginson, Nobahar Mahdavi and Olivia Norris	This Egg, MadeMyWardrobe, Untapped Underbelly and New Diorama
DUPed	John McCann	Ambergris
Mark Thomas – Check Up: Our NHS at 70	Mark Thomas	Lakin McCarthy
My Left Right Foot – The Musical	Robert Softley Gale, Scott Gilmour, Claire McKenzie, and Richard Thomas	Birds of Paradise and the National Theatre of Scotland
On the Exhale	Martin Zimmerman	China Plate and Audible
Square Go	Kieran Hurley and Gary McNair	Francesca Moody
Underground Railroad Game	Jennifer Kidwell and Scott R. Sheppard	Soho Theatre and Ars Nova of New York
Archive of Educated Hearts	Casey Jay Andrews	Lion House Theatre
It's True It's True It's True	Breach Theatre	Breach Theatre, Untapped by Underbelly and New Diorama
Power Play: Funeral Flowers	Emma Dennis-Edwards	Power Play
Trojan Horse	Helen Monks and Matt Woodhead	Lung & West Yorkshire Playhouse
Unsung	Valentijn Dhaenens	Skagen/KVS, Big In Belgium, Richard Jordan, TRP and Summerhall
Valerie	Robin Kelly, Cherie Moore and Tom Broome	Last Tapes Theatre Co

=== 2019 ===
Work	Writer(s)	Company
Arthur	Daniel Bye	Daniel Bye, One Tenth Human, and ARC, Stockton
Enough	Stef Smith (playwright)	Traverse Theatre
How Not to Drown	Nicola McCartney and Dritan Kastrati	ThickSkin with Traverse Theatre, Tron Theatre and Lawrence Batley Theatre Huddersfield
Mustard	Eva O'Connor	Eva O'Connor
Raven	Still Hungry Collective (Berlin)	Chamaleon Theatre and Aurora Nova
Rich Kids: A History of Shopping Malls in Teheran	Javaad Alipoor	Javaad Alipoor and HOME Manchester in association with Traverse Theatre
Are We Not Drawn Onward To New Era	Ontroerend Goed	Ontroerend Goed, Theatre Royal Plymouth, Vooruit and Richard Jordan Productions in association with Zoo
Bobby & Amy	Emily Jenkins	Emma Blackman Productions and Emily Jenkins
Everything I See I Swallow	Mary Taylor and Tamsin Shasha	Shasha and Taylor Productions
Lipsync	Kirsty Young with Jenna Watt	Cumbernauld Theatre
The Patient Gloria	Gina Moxley	Gina Moxley and Abbey Theatre with Pan Pan Theatre Company
Sh!t Theatre Drink Rum with Expats	Sh!t Theatre	Soho Theatre in association with Show and Tell
Subject Mater	Nadia Cavalera	Woven Voices
Until the Flood	Dael Orlandersmith	Arcola Theatre Production Company
The Afflicted	Jake Jeppson and Groupwork	Groupwork
Baby Reindeer	Richard Gadd	Francesca Moody Productions
The Desk	Reetta Honkakoski	Reetta Honkakoski Company in association with Start To Finnish
Dispatches on the Red Dress	Rowan Rheingans	Rowan Rheingans
E8	Marika McKennell	The North Wall, Oxford in association with the Pleasance

=== 2020 ===
The 2020 Edinburgh Festival Fringe was cancelled because of the COVID-19 pandemic, and no Fringe First awards were presented.

=== 2022 ===
Work	Writer(s)	Company
Happy Meal	Tabby Lamb	
Breathless	Laura Horton	
And Then The Rodeo Burned Down	Chloe Rice and Natasha Roland	
The Beatles Were a Boyband	Rachel O'Regan	
Masterclass	Feidlim Cannon, Gary Keegan & Adrienne Truscott	Brokentalkers
The Last Return	Sonya Kelly	Druid
Ode To Joy	James Ley	
You're Safe Til 2024: Deep History	David Finnigan	
Brown Boys Swim	Karim Khan	
Manic Street Creature	Maimuna Memon	
Truth's A Dog Must To Kennel	Tim Crouch	
Aberdeen	Cassie Workman	
Age Is A Feeling	Haley McGee	
Feeling Afraid As If Something Terrible Is Going To Happen	Marcelo Dos Santos	
This Is Memorial Device	Graham Eatough	
Silkworm	Vlad Butucea	Pearlfisher
This Is Not A Show About Hong Kong	Max Percy	

=== 2023 ===
Work	Writer(s)	Company
Lorenzo	Ben Target	
Strategic Love Play	Miriam Battye	Paines Plough
Beasts (Why Girls Shouldn't Fear the Dark)	Mandi Chivasa	
The Insider	Anna Skov Jensen	Teater Katapult
What If They Ate the Baby?	Xhloe Rice and Natasha Roland	
Gunter	Dirty Hare	Dirty Hare
Club Life	Fred Deakin	Davie Miller / Fred Deakin
Blue	June Carryl	
The Last of the Soviets	Spitfire	Spitfire
Choo Choo!	StammerMouth	StammerMouth
Everything Under the Sun	Jack MacGregor	O'NeillRoss for Army at the Fringe
Square Peg	Simeon Morris	
The Grand Old Opera House Hotel	Isobel McArthur	Traverse Theatre
Heaven	Eugene O'Brien	Fishamble
England and Son	Ed Edwards and Mark Thomas	Mark Thomas
Funeral	Ontroerend Goed	Ontroerend Goed
JM Coetzee's Life and Times of Michael K	Lara Foot (adapted from J. M. Coetzee)	Baxter Theatre
A Funeral for My Friend Who Is Still Alive	Kasen Tsui	Kasen Tsui x Cathy Lam

=== 2024 ===
Work	Writer(s)	Company
Batshit	Leah Shelton	
The Border	Studio Wachowicz-Fret	Studio Wachowicz-Fret
Cyrano	Virginia Gay	
A History of Paper	Oliver Emanuel and Gareth Williams	Traverse Theatre
June Carter Cash: The Woman, Her Music And Me	Charlene Boyd	
So Young	Douglas Maxwell	Traverse Theatre
VL	Kieran Hurley and Gary McNair	Francesca Moody
Weather Girl	Brian Watkins	
Son of a Bitch	Anna Morris	
Mairi Campbell: Living Stone	Mairi Campbell	
A Letter to Lyndon B Johnson or God: Whoever Reads This First	Xhloe Rice and Natasha Roland	
Comala, Comala	Pulpo Arts	Pulpo Arts
My Mother's Funeral: The Show	Kelly Jones	Paines Plough
A Knock on the Roof	Khawla Ibraheem	
Instructions	Nathan Ellis	
Revenge: After the Levoyah	Nick Cassenbaum	
A Little Inquest Into What We Are All Doing Here	Josie Dale-Jones	

=== 2025 ===
Work	Writer(s)	Company
Eat The Rich (but maybe not me mates x)		Jade Franks
Kanpur: 1857	Niall Moorjani	
Monstering the Rocketman	Henry Naylor	Henry Naylor
Red Like Fruit	Hannah Moscovitch	2b theatre
She's Behind You	Johnny McKnight	Traverse Theatre
Ordinary Decent Criminal	Ed Edwards and Mark Thomas	Lakin McCarthy
Lost Lear	Dan Colley	Riverbank Productions
Rift	Gabriel Jason Dean	Luna Stage
NIUSIA	Beth Paterson	Beth Paterson
The Horse of Jenin	Alaa Shehada	
Youth in Flames	Mimi Martin	
Ohio	Abigail and Shaun Bengson	Bengsons
#CHARLOTTESVILLE - The Play That Trump Does Not Want You To See!	Priyanka Shetty	
Hot Mess	Ellie Coote and Jack Godfrey	
Philosophy of the World	Nora Alexander, Kat Cory and Dora Lynn	In Bed With My Brother

=== 2026 ===
Work	Writer(s)	Company
Adam Riches: The Captain	Adam Riches	
Amnesia	Kimberly Hart-Simpson	
Bigfoot Ripped My Dog In Half I Saw It	Xhloe Rice & Natasha Roland	
Ham	Mary Higgins & Ell Potter	
Little Animals	Paul Ready	
Mayflies	Ben Harrison	Grid Iron
One Hundred Voices	Nicola McCartney	
Parasocial Activity	Briony Martha & Megan Brewer	
Slayers	Corinne Salisbury	
Salty Brine: HOW STRANGE IT IS (The Neutral Milk Hotel Show)	Salty Brine	
Supposing	Zinnie Harris	
Tether	Wonder Fools & Yoon Junghwan	
The Singer	Cora Bissett	Traverse Theatre
The Bridge	Alaa Shehada	
Distance	Ben Norris	
Toast	Jude Green	
Turn Your F*cking Phones Off	Hannah Maxwell	

== See also ==
- Edinburgh Comedy Awards
