= Benedict Andrews =

Australian theatre and film director (born 1972)

- Born: 1972 (age 53–54); Adelaide, South Australia, Australia
- Occupations: Theatre director; Film director
- Years active: 1995–present
- Website: www.benedictandrews.com

Benedict Andrews (born 1972) is an Australian theatre and film director, based in Reykjavík. Born in Adelaide in 1972, he was educated at Flinders University Drama Centre. His first feature film Una (an adaptation of Blackbird by David Harrower) was released in 2016.

== Theatre ==
Andrews has directed for theatres in both Australia and Europe. He is known for his versions of works by Shakespeare, Anton Chekhov, Jean Genet, and Tennessee Williams, as well as his stagings of contemporary writers such as David Harrower, Martin Crimp, Marius von Mayenburg, Caryl Churchill and Sarah Kane.

His marathon Shakespeare cycle, The War of the Roses (Sydney Theatre Company, 2009) which was a part of the 2009 Sydney and Perth festivals, received six Helpmann Awards in 2012 including Best Play and Best Direction of a Play, as well as five Sydney Theatre Awards for Best Direction and Best Mainstage Production. The two-night eight-hour production of The War of the Roses incorporates all eight War of the Roses Shakespearean plays in name but largely cut out the Henrys, making it in large part a combination of both Richard II and Richard III. The first night consisted of Richard II, Henry IV and Henry V. The second consisted of Henry VI and Richard III. The production was also memorable for having his two female leads, Cate Blanchett and Pamela Rabe, play Richard II and Richard III, respectively, while still dressing in modern gender-neutral clothing.

Andrews has been a regular guest at London's Young Vic, Sydney Theatre Company (STC) and Belvoir St Theatre in Sydney, the Schaubühne am Lehniner Platz in Berlin, and the National Theatre of Iceland in Reykjavik. Key productions include his production of Chekhov's Three Sisters which won the Critics Theatre Award in 2012 for Best Director, Groß und Klein (STC, 2011) for which Andrews received the 2011 Helpmann Best Director award for the third time and which toured to Théâtre de la Ville (Paris), The Barbican (London), the Wiener Festwochen (Vienna) and the Ruhrfestspiele (Recklinghausen).

His production of Tennessee Williams' A Streetcar Named Desire (with Gillian Anderson and Ben Foster) at London's Young Vic opened at St. Ann's Warehouse, New York City, in April 2016. His STC production of Jean Genet's The Maids (with Cate Blanchett, Elizabeth Debicki and Isabelle Huppert) was played as part of the 2014 Lincoln Center Festival in New York City.

In January 2026, the National Theatre in London announced Electra/Persona, a new play adapted and directed by Andrews combining Sophocles' Electra and the 1966 Ingmar Bergman film Persona, to premiere at its Lyttelton Theatre in August of that year.

== Opera ==
Andrews also works extensively in opera. In autumn 2015, he directed La bohème in London, a Dutch National Opera co-production with English National Opera (ENO). His prior ENO production, Detlev Glanert's Caligula (2012) was nominated for the Laurence Olivier Award for Best New Opera Production and toured in 2014 to the Teatro Colón, Buenos Aires. Other recent opera productions includes Verdi's Macbeth at Royal Danish Opera; The Marriage of Figaro at Sydney Opera House; The Fiery Angel at Komische Oper Berlin.

== Writing ==
As a writer, Andrews' theatrical adaptations include: The Maids (with Andrew Upton), Three Sisters, The Seagull, The War of the Roses (with Tom Wright) and Life Is a Dream (with Beatrix Christian).

Andrews' first original play Every Breath was produced at Belvoir St Theatre in 2012 and subsequently translated into Portuguese by Jorge Silva Melo and produced by Artistas Unidos in Lisbon 2013, directed by John Romão. The Portuguese production was nominated for Time Out Lisbon's Best Play award. The premiere of his 2016 play Gloria was shown by the Griffin Theatre Company in Sydney, directed by Lee Lewis with Marta Dusseldorp in the title role who also played Queen Margaret in Andrews' The War of the Roses in 2009.

Andrews' first volume of poetry, Lens Flare, was published in 2014 by Pitt Poetry.

== Film ==
In November 2014, it was announced Andrews would make his directorial debut on Una starring Rooney Mara and Ben Mendelsohn, an adaption of the Broadway play Blackbird by David Harrower. The film had its world premiere at the Telluride Film Festival on September 2, 2016. It also screened at the Toronto International Film Festival, and the BFI London Film Festival.

In March 2018, it was announced that Andrews would direct Seberg, a political thriller that tells the true story of the attempts made by the FBI to discredit actress Jean Seberg through its COINTELPRO program in response to her support of the Black Panther Party. Actress Kristen Stewart was cast to play Seberg in the film. It had its world premiere at the Venice Film Festival on August 30, 2019.

== Notable productions ==
- 2017 Cat on a Hot Tin Roof, Young Vic
- 2014 A Streetcar Named Desire, Young Vic
- 2013 The Maids, by Jean Genet, Sydney Theatre Company
- 2012 Three Sisters, Young Vic
- 2012 Gross und Klein, Barbican
- 2011 The Seagull, Belvoir St Theatre, Sydney
- 2009 The City by Martin Crimp, Sydney Theatre Company
- 2009 The War of the Roses, Sydney Theatre Company
- 2007 The Season at Sarsaparilla by Patrick White, Sydney Theatre Company
- 2005 Julius Caesar, Sydney Theatre Company
- 2003 Endgame, Sydney Theatre Company
- 2000 Attempts on her Life by Martin Crimp, Sydney Theatre Company
- 2000 La Dispute by Pierre Marivaux, translated by Timberlake Wertenbaker, Sydney Theatre Company
