= Una (film) =

2016 drama film

- Theatrical release poster
- Directed by: Benedict Andrews
- Screenplay by: David Harrower
- Based on: Blackbird by David Harrower
- Produced by: Maya Amsellem; Patrick Daly; Jean Doumanian
- Starring: Rooney Mara; Ben Mendelsohn; Riz Ahmed; Ruby Stokes; Tara Fitzgerald; Natasha Little; Tobias Menzies
- Cinematography: Thimios Bakatakis
- Edited by: Nick Fenton
- Music by: Jed Kurzel
- Production companies: Bron Creative; Jean Doumanian Productions; WestEnd Films; Film4 Productions
- Distributed by: Swen; Thunderbird Releasing
- Release dates: September 2, 2016 (Telluride); September 1, 2017 (United Kingdom); October 6, 2017 (United States)
- Running time: 94 minutes
- Countries: United States; United Kingdom; Canada
- Language: English
- Box office: $676,949

Una is a 2016 drama film directed by Benedict Andrews based upon the play Blackbird by David Harrower, who also wrote the film's screenplay. It stars Rooney Mara, Ben Mendelsohn, Riz Ahmed, Ruby Stokes, Tara Fitzgerald, Natasha Little, and Tobias Menzies. The film focuses on the titular character, who confronts the man who groomed and abused her as a child many years earlier.

The film had its world premiere at the 43rd Telluride Film Festival on September 2, 2016. It was released in the United Kingdom on September 1, 2017, by Thunderbird Releasing and in the United States on October 6, 2017, by Swen.

== Plot ==
A young woman, Una Spencer, goes to the office of Peter Trevelyan, a manager at a large warehouse, to his shock.

Flashbacks show that Peter used to be named Ray Brooks, and was the next-door neighbor and trusted friend of Una's father. Ray groomed the 13-year-old Una into a three month relationship. The two planned to elope to Europe, but the night before they were to take a ferry, Ray takes her virginity in a coast hotel room. He leaves the room afterwards; Una, believing he abandoned her, wanders the streets distraught and bewildered, to be returned home by police after she shares what had happened to her.

Ray is arrested and serves four years in prison for his crime. Una grows up lonely and confused, believing she was in love with Ray and feeling more hurt by him abandoning her than by his abuse. She is ostracized by her peers and her father turns violent out of rage towards Ray before he passes away years later due to an accident at home. As an adult fifteen years later, she lives with her mother and takes solace in going out for one-night stands, unable to form a lasting relationship due to the trauma of her abuse. Meanwhile, Ray, as Peter, finds success in his career and has since married. Una finds where he works through a newspaper photograph and travels to the warehouse.

After Ray brings her to the warehouse's locker room, Una, still emotionally wounded from the abuse, confronts him. Ray is dismissive and defensive and fears she may want to damage his career or even kill him. Ray leaves the room to attend a critical staff meeting, where he must announce cutbacks and layoffs to employees. Rattled by Una's presence, he instead tells his coworkers that management wanted him to generate a list of people to fire. He then leaves abruptly, and hides from angry executives and his fellow staff members.

Una finds Ray and they quarrel before reminiscing about their affair. Ray insists that he is not by nature a hebephile and was genuinely in love with her, and tells her that he is now married to a woman his age. To Una's surprise, he explains that he didn't intend to abandon her; he had needed a walk and a drink to clear his head before they would elope, but returned to find that she had left. Unable to deny their lingering attraction to one another, Una and Ray have sex, but before it goes too far, Ray abruptly leaves, leaving her feeling abandoned once again.

Ray tells his co-worker Scott, who is afraid of being laid off, to escort Una out of the warehouse. She invites herself to Scott's flat, where she seduces him. After preparing for a large party later that evening, Ray has sex with his wife Yvonne at home with his eyes closed. Meanwhile, Una claims to be "Pete's" daughter, and persuades Scott to escort her to Ray's comfortable suburban home after being informed about the party.

Upon arriving at the party, Scott quickly finds out that Una was lying upon introducing herself to Yvonne, and Ray is shocked to see Scott and Una arrive. Yvonne and Una talk briefly, and Yvonne hints that their marriage is not entirely happy. Una wanders upstairs, where she enters the room of Ray's 13-year-old stepdaughter and lies on her bed. The stepdaughter enters and demands an explanation why she is there. Una quickly leaves the house with Ray, Yvonne, and Scott following along. Ray approaches Una and denies her wordless accusation of possibly abusing his stepdaughter and insists again that Una was "the only one" before he kisses her on the cheek. Ray sees Yvonne, his stepdaughter, and Scott had been looking on from a distance. Realizing Ray is unapologetic, a disappointed Una leaves the party and walks off into the dark while Ray returns to his observing family and friends.

== Cast ==
- Rooney Mara as Una Spencer (age 28)
  - Ruby Stokes as young Una (age 13)
- Ben Mendelsohn as Ray Brooks / Peter "Pete" Trevelyan
- Riz Ahmed as Scott
- Tara Fitzgerald as Andrea
- Natasha Little as Yvonne
- Tobias Menzies as Mark
- Indira Varma as Sonia
- Isobelle Molloy as Holly
- Ciarán McMenamin as John

== Production ==
In November 2014, it was announced that Rooney Mara and Ben Mendelsohn had been cast as Una and Ray respectively, with Benedict Andrews directing from a screenplay by David Harrower who also wrote the stage play on which the film is based. With Jean Doumanian, Patrick Daly, and Maya Amsellem, producing under their Jean Doumanian Productions and West End Films banners respectively. Celia Duval co-produced, with executive producers Jason Cloth, Aaron L. Gilbert under his Bron Studios banner, as well as Sharon Harel, Kevin Loader, Eve Schoukroun. In May 2015, Film4 joined the film as a financier. In June 2015, Indira Varma, Tara Fitzgerald, and Riz Ahmed were all confirmed to star in the film. Jed Kurzel composed the film's score.

Production on the film began on June 13, 2015, in the United Kingdom. Further filming locations include Dungeness, Greatstone and Lydd, in Romney Marsh, Kent which feature as a remote hideaway location.

== Release ==
In September 2015, Variety released the first image from the film. In November 2015, it was announced the film had been re-titled Una. In November 2015, IndieWire released another image from the film.

The film had its world premiere at the 43rd Telluride Film Festival on September 2, 2016. It also screened at the Toronto International Film Festival on September 11, 2016 and the BFI London Film Festival on October 9, 2016. Shortly after, Swen acquired U.S. distribution rights to the film, partnering with Eammon Films handling the theatrical release. Thunderbird Releasing acquired U.K. distribution rights to the film and released it in the United Kingdom on September 1, 2017. It was released on October 6, 2017, in the United States.

== Reception ==
Una received positive reviews from film critics. It holds a 76% approval rating on review aggregator website Rotten Tomatoes, based on 98 reviews, with an average rating of 6.77/10. The website's critical consensus reads, "Una's well-matched leads bring an uncomfortable story fearlessly to life, keeping the movie consistently gripping as it navigates the tricky journey from stage to screen." On Metacritic, the film holds a rating of 62 out of 100, based on 28 critics, indicating "generally favorable reviews".
