= The Stars in the Bright Sky =

2010 novel by Alan Warner

- First edition
- Author: Alan Warner
- Language: English
- Genre: Literary fiction
- Publisher: Jonathan Cape (2010); Vintage (2011)
- Publication date: 2010
- Publication place: Scotland
- Media type: Print (paperback)
- Pages: 400
- ISBN: 978-0-09-946182-1
- OCLC: 501395538
- Preceded by: The Worms Can Carry Me To Heaven

The Stars in the Bright Sky is the sixth novel by Scottish writer Alan Warner. First published in 2010, it is a follow-up to his 1998 book The Sopranos. The earlier novel followed a group of Catholic schoolgirls from a bleak town in the west coast of Scotland on a disastrous day trip to Edinburgh to participate in a national choir competition. The Stars in the Bright Sky returns to most of these characters three years later, and presents an account of their attempt to arrange a holiday abroad.

== Plot summary ==
The story, set in 2001, starts at London's Gatwick Airport, where Manda, Chell, Kylah, Kay, Finn and her friend from university, Ava have met to go on a joint holiday. They have not yet agreed upon a destination, planning to do so at the airport before booking a low-cost last-minute deal.

This plan is hindered when it becomes apparent that Manda has lost her passport. Much of the narrative takes place in the airport's lounges, bars and near by hotels that the group are confined to for several days (although they do break out to the Kent countryside), as they attempt to go abroad. The main themes explored through the characters' interactions are social class and friendship.

== Critical reception ==
The novel received generally favourable critical reviews in the mainstream UK press, with some exceptions.

The Sunday Times said that: "Warner not only satirises the crassness of contemporary life but underlines the inequities of social class... the way that this middle-aged man manages to inhabit a gang of girls with such gusto and conviction is one of the small miracles of contemporary fiction." The Independent opined that "Warner navigates the comic, the philosophical and the socially acute like no other writer we have". The Observer said that the plot was compelling: "as the women reacquaint themselves with each other, the reader is rapidly drawn into their lives and the complex web of their relationships through their vivid conversation".

The Guardian praised the story's "compassionate and funny depiction of the bonds of friendship" and "brilliantly pitched dialogue and monologue". The Herald said that Manda was "the most vivid, aggravating lynchpin in recent Scottish fiction", but felt of the book that "tone ... is a problem throughout ... and some passages are woefully out of key".

For The Daily Telegraph, the "dark and powerfully odd" book has "finely caught dialogue and wicked charm", but "[some] passages appear to have been written in a hurry". To the Scotland on Sunday, "the book's underlying anger does occasionally mire a plot which – like its characters – is going nowhere fast".

The novel was short-listed for the 2010 Scottish Book of the Year Award and long-listed for the 2010 Man Booker Prize for Fiction and the 2011 Creative Scotland Book of the Year Awards.
