= Jackie Wylie =

Theatre director and executive

Jackie Wylie is a Scottish cultural event organizer. She has been the artistic director and chief executive of the National Theatre of Scotland since 2017. She founded the Glasgow-based international performance festival Take Me Somewhere, and was artistic director of The Arches from 2008 to 2015.

== Early life ==
Wylie was born in Edinburgh in 1980. She received a first class MA in Theatre, Film and Television Studies from the University of Glasgow in 2001 and worked in film and television production until 2004, when she went to work for The Arches in Glasgow. She became Artistic Director of the Arches in 2008 at the age of 28, becoming the youngest serving director of a major Scottish venue .

== The Arches ==
Under Wylie, the venue's artistic output shifted from the more traditional productions of the Arches Theatre Company to supporting and nurturing new Scottish talent. She developed artists like Kieran Hurley, Gary McNair, Rosanna Cade, Rob Drummond, Julia Taudevin and Nic Green, commissioning work that would eventually tour internationally. Theatre critic Lyn Gardner described the venue under Wylie as “one of the reasons that in recent years Glasgow has become a magnet for young performance-makers...as significant as Battersea Arts Centre in London in the way it nurtures tomorrow.”

In 2009 Wylie created the Behaviour festival, which brought globally renowned international artists and companies like Gob Squad, Ann Liv Young, Tim Crouch, Bryony Kimmings, Ontroerend Goed and The TEAM to Glasgow

Wylie also co-commissioned large-scale performances by internationally established artists such as DEREVO's Natura Morte, and Linder Sterling's 13 hour performance Darktown Cakewalk.

Wylie was on maternity leave when the venue closed in 2015. She received a research grant from Creative Scotland and Glasgow Life to investigate how to fill the space left by The Arches, resulting in the festival.

== National Theatre of Scotland ==
Jackie is the third Artistic Director of the National Theatre of Scotland, after Laurie Sansom and Vicky Featherstone.

Jackie’s work at NTS includes the musical Orphans, an adaptation of Peter Mullan’s 1998 film, Futureproof, and the revival of The Cheviot The Stag and The Black Black Oil.

== Accolades ==
- Fellow of the Royal Society of Edinburgh. 2023
- Honorary Doctor of Letters - University of Glasgow. 2022
- Nominated Scottish Style Awards Tastemaker. 2018
- Fellow of the Clore Leadership Programme. 2016 - 2017
- International Society for the Performing Arts Fellow. 2010 – 2013

== Interviews and press ==
- The Scotsman - National Theatre pledges to bring in 'more diverse voices' and celebrate Scotland’s ‘many identities’ 2023
- The Sunday Post - Our plays for today: National Theatre of Scotland’s artistic director on offering a haven in economic storm 2023
- The Stage - The Stage 100 2023
- The National - Jackie Wylie: 10 things that changed my life 2019
- The Times - Jackie Wylie, artistic director of NTS: ‘For me the responsibility is to look at the complexities of Scotland now’ 2017
- The Scotsman - 25 most eligible women in Scotland 2011
