= Cora Bissett =

Scottish theatre director, playwright, actor and musician

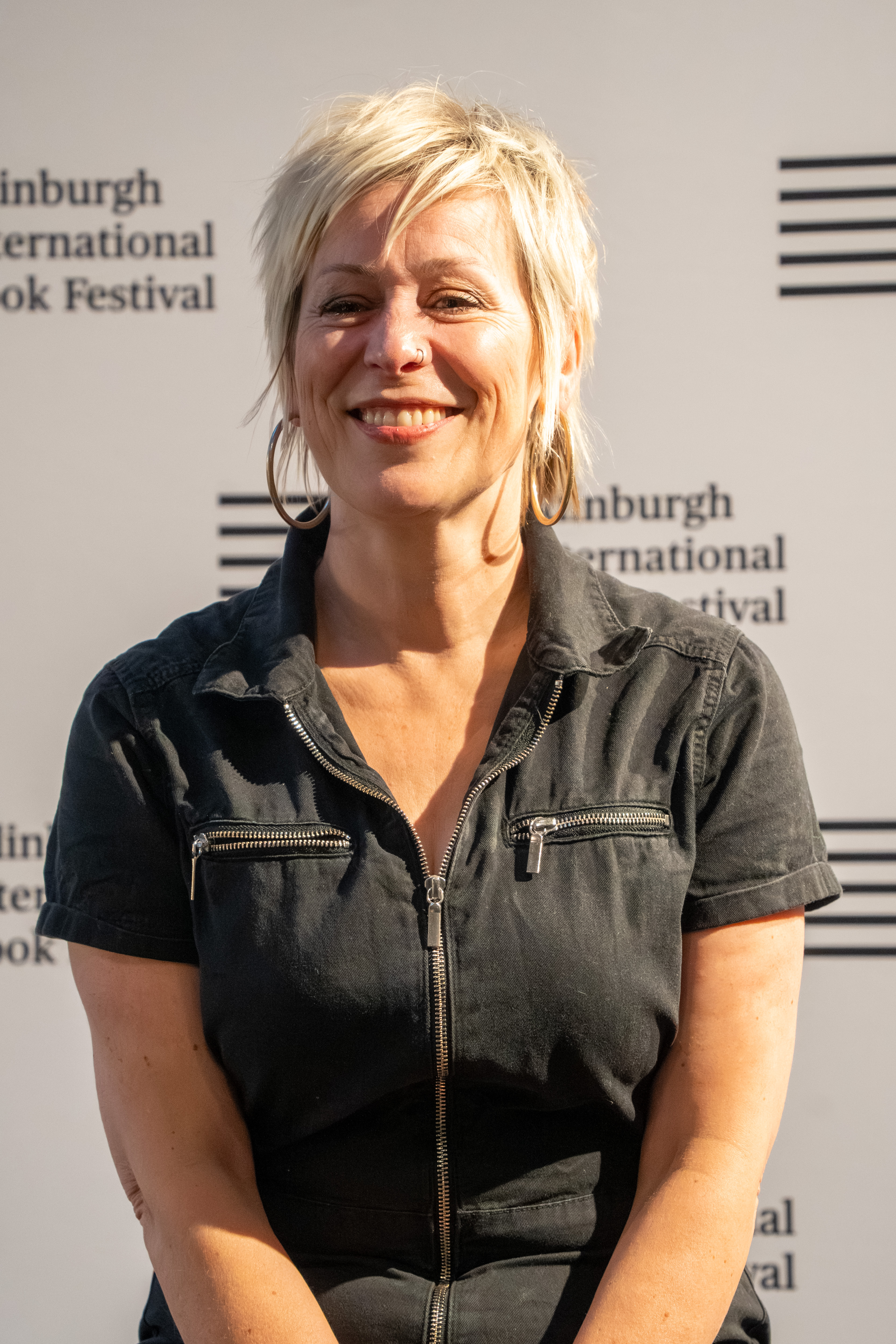
- Born: 1974 (age 51–52); Glenrothes, Fife, Scotland
- Education: Royal Conservatoire of Scotland
- Occupations: Theatre director, playwright, actor, musician
- Agent(s): Casarotto Ramsay & Associates

Cora Bissett (born 1974) is a Scottish theatre director, playwright, actor and musician. As a director she has created the ground-breaking BSL music-theatre show The Singer, The Burns Project, June Carter Cash- the Woman, Her Music and Me, Adam, Roadkill, Grit: The Martyn Bennett Story, Glasgow Girls and Room. As an actor she has appeared in The Ridge, Annika, The Bombing of Pan Am 103, Rab C. Nesbitt and High Times. She was associate director at the National Theatre of Scotland from 2014-2022.

== Early life ==
Bissett was born in Glenrothes, Fife, Scotland.

She was the lead singer in the indie rock band Darlingheart who released one album in 1993 before splitting up. The band received favourable write-ups with the Scottish music press making Bissett a cover star. Her time in the band was the inspiration for her autobiographical play, What Girls Are Made Of, which debuted at the 2018 Edinburgh Fringe.

In 1995 she was the singer in the band, Swelling Meg, a three-piece "comprising acoustic guitar, bowed double-bass and Bissett's athletic voice". They performed at that year's T in the Park festival.

Between 1993 and 1997 she attended the Royal Scottish Academy of Music and Drama (RSAMD) where she studied theatre, graduating with a BA in Dramatic Studies.

== Directing career ==
Bissett has been directing work since 2008 when she applied for the Arches Award for New Directors.

She has created many highly acclaimed new works including most recently 'The Singer' (Dundee Rep/ The Traverse Thetare) which she collaborated on with Fife Pop star and Grammy nominated musician KT Tunstall.

She was Associate Director at the National Theatre of Scotland 2014-22. Theatre Productions include the musical

adaptation of Peter Mullan’s iconic film ‘ORPHANS’ the political musical GLASGOW

GIRLS, and ‘ADAM’ ( written by Frances Poet) which Cora then went on to co-direct as a

TV drama for BBC Scotland/ BBC Arts, winning a SCOTTISH BAFTA 2022. (co-directed

with Lou Lockwood) Cora’s recent short film THE SINGER (Produced by Laura McBride and

MTP and mentored by Academy Award winner Andrea Arnold) was nominated for the

Best Short Film at the BFI Film Festival 2023.

Other theatre projects include The Burns Project written by James Clements, June Carter Cash, the Woman, her Music and Me, by Charlene Boyd, Float by Indra Wilson.

Bissett was invited to receive an OBE for her services to theatre in the 2023 New years Honours List. Bissett decided that accepting the title was problematic for her for various reasons and so declined.

In 2007, she devised Amada with three actors. It was an adaptation of an Isabel Allende short story about a woman whose personality changes as a result of an accident. Bissett was the joint winner of the 2007 Arches Award for new directors for Amada.

Roadkill, was a 2010 Edinburgh Festival Fringe show devised by Bissett and Stef Smith about sex trafficking. The performance at the Theatre Royal Stratford East won an Olivier Award in 2012.

In 2011 she conceived the musical Glasgow Girls with book by David Greig about a group of activists who took up an ethical fight against the deportation of asylum seekers who had settled in Scotland. In 2013 the show was shortlisted for best musical production at the UK Theatre Awards.

In 2012 she collaborated with Greig, Swimmer One and other artists to create Whatever gets you through the night at The Arches.

In 2013 she directed Peter Arnott's short play about Janis Joplin.

Grit: The Martyn Bennett Story was created by as part of the 2014 Commonwealth Games cultural programme. After being conceived by Bissett, it was written by playwright Kieran Hurley. Bissett directed the show, having worked in close collaboration with Bennett's friends and family to create the show. It premiered at the Tramway in Glasgow in May 2014, then was performed in Mull. It was named event of the year at the 2014 Scots Trad Music Awards.

In addition to directing, Bissett co-wrote the music for a stage version of Emma Donoghue's book Room, with Kathryn Joseph. which was produced by Theatre Royal Stratford East and Dublin's Abbey Theatre, in association with National Theatre of Scotland and Covent Garden Productions.

In 2014 she became a part-time associate director at the National Theatre of Scotland (NTS). In 2022, she directed Orphans, a stage adaptation of the 1998 cult film of the same name.

Bissett directed Gregory Burke's Gagarin Way for Dundee Rep in 2018.

== Acting career ==
In 2018 Bissett won The Herald Culture Award for Oustanding Performance for her autobiographical role in her play What Girls Are Made of, Directed by Orla O'Loughlin and produced by Raw Material. The play was phenomenally successful seling out an entire Edinburgh Festival run, then touring to The Soho Theatre London, to Melbourne, Sau Paulo, and Charleston festivals.

In 2009 Bissett won the Best Actress at Stage Awards for Acting Excellence.

She continues to balance her Directing work with regualr appearnaces on Tv and in theatre. Most recently she has appeared as Edna in The Bombing of Pan Am 103 ( World Productions/ Netflix), In Shetland ( BBC Scotland) Annika, and as Jacky Poole in The Ridge.

Bissett appeared regularly in the comedy series Rab C. Nesbitt, as a barmaid. She appeared as a regular cahracter in both sreries of cult Scottish drama High Times. She also appeared in the 2006 film Red Road.
