= The Singer (play) =

2026 play by Cora Bissett

- Official poster of the 2026 Fringe production
- Original language: BSL; English
- Written by: Cora Bissett

Premiere
- Date: 9 August 2026
- Place: Traverse Theatre, Edinburgh
- Directed by: Cora Bissett

The Singer is a play based on the 2023 short film by Cora Bissett and Jamie Rea, adapted further for the stage by Cora Bissett. Featuring music and lyrics by Katie Tunstall it began previews at the Dundee Repertory Theatre in July 2026, before receiving its world premiere at the Traverse Theatre, Edinburgh as part of Edinburgh Festival Fringe.

Set in Glasgow it follows a deaf drummer, who meets a busker and forms an unlikely creative partnership. Performed in the style of gig theatre, The Singer features British Sign Language, spoken English and captioning.

== Background ==
in 2018, Cora Bissett first met Northern Irish deaf actor Jamie Rea at a BA Performance in British Sign Language (BSL) event, where he performed in BSL along to a song. During the COVID-19 pandemic they collaborated on a short film, which premiered at the Edinburgh International Film Festival in 2023. The film followed Joe a deaf musician, who meets busker Andy and forms a unique creative partnership.

In November 2025, it was announced the film was being adapted into a play and would preview at the Dundee Repertory Theatre in 2026. The following day it was revealed that it would receive its world premiere in Edinburgh at the Traverse Theatre.

The play is written and directed by Cora Bissett, with dramaturgy by David Greig and music and lyrics by Katie Tunstall. It features musical direction by Michael John McCarthy, sound design by Garry Boyle, design by Jenny Booth and lighting by Emma Jones. The integral captioning is by Daniel Hughes and BSL direction by Benedetta Zanetti.

Whilst writing the music and lyrics Tunstall was able to draw on her own experiences. She was a busker in Glasgow and suffers from Tinnitus and is deaf in her left ear. Her brother is profoundly deaf.

The Singer features themes of inclusivity, ableism and identity.

== Production ==
In July 2026, The Singer began previews at the Dundee Repertory Theatre. On 9 August 2026, it transferred to the Traverse Theatre in Edinburgh, where as part of the Edinburgh Festival Fringe, it received its world premiere performance. The cast includes writer Jamie Rea as Joe, Dylan Wood as Andy, with Hannah Jarrett-Scott and Petre Dobre as oracles.

Following its run at the Fringe The Singer will embark on a short Scottish tour to The Lemon Tree in Aberdeen, and the Citizens Theatre in Glasgow, before returning to the Dundee Repertory Theatre.

A typical performance runs for one hour and twenty five minutes.

== Cast and characters ==
Character	Short Film	World Premiere
Character	2023	2026
Joe	Jamie Rea	Jamie Rea
Andy	Jack Stewart	Dylan Wood
Oracle and other characters	N/A	Hannah Jarrett-Scott Petre Dobre

== Awards ==
The play won an Edinburgh Fringe First Award.
