= Toby Studebaker =

Toby Studebaker is a former U.S. Marine who abducted a 12-year-old British girl in 2003 after grooming her via the Internet and was jailed for four and a half years.

He was born in Constantine, Michigan, in 1971, and trained in North Carolina with the 4th Marine Expeditionary Brigade, an anti-terrorism unit. Following the September 11, 2001 attacks, he was posted to Afghanistan, where he helped guard Taliban and al-Qaeda suspects at Kandahar International Airport.

He met Shevaun Pennington in July 2002 through the inline game Neopets when she was 11 years old, though she had originally claimed to be 17. She left her home in Leigh, Greater Manchester, on July 12, 2003, telling her parents she was going shopping. However, they flew to Paris and stayed in a hotel for two days, where he raped her, before traveling to Strasbourg. They were gone a total of five days, but he was finally arrested in Frankfurt and extradited to the UK in August.

He pleaded guilty at Manchester Crown Court in front of Lord Justice Leveson to abduction and incitement to gross indecency, and was jailed for four and a half years on April 2, 2004. He was deported to the United States at the end of this sentence, where he was jailed for another 11 years and 4 months by the federal court in Kalamazoo, Michigan, in April 2008, for the same offense. He was also charged under American law with transporting a child across international boundaries for sexual exploitation. He received a concurrent sentence of 7 years and 11 months for possessing child pornography.

According to an affidavit filed in 1998 in Michigan, a 12-year-old relative complained that Studebaker fondled her while they were wrestling, but it was dropped during the preliminary proceeding.

The case is credited with encouraging the creation of a law against child grooming over the Internet in Scotland, after criticism that British courts were unable to consider offenses involving sexual intercourse because the activity happened abroad.

Studebaker was released from prison on April 14, 2017.

David Harrower's play Blackbird was inspired by the events.
