= Morvern Callar =

Novel by Alan Warner

- First edition cover
- Author: Alan Warner
- Language: Scots
- Genre: Experimental novel; literary fiction
- Publisher: Vintage Press
- Publication date: 1995
- Publication place: Scotland
- Media type: Paperback
- Pages: 240
- ISBN: 9780099586111
- Followed by: These Demented Lands

Morvern Callar is a 1995 experimental existential novel by Scottish author Alan Warner. Published as his first novel, its first-person narrative—mainly written in Scots—explores the social life and cultural interests of the titular character following the sudden death of her boyfriend.

The novel was a winner of the Somerset Maugham Award in 1996, and a critically acclaimed adaptation directed by Scottish film director Lynne Ramsay was released in 2002.

== Background and development ==
In an interview with Zoë Strachan Warner talked about how formative existentialist books such as The Stranger and Nausea were for him and how this existentialism made its way into Morvern Callar. In a 2011 interview with Scottish Review of Books Warner mentioned his desire to "force the social reality [he] knew into the novel form" while writing his debut.

Warner initially developed the narrative of Morvern Callar from the perspective of the titular character's boyfriend. He became frustrated with the rigidity of the perspective and reworked the novel to be from Callar's perspective, and to begin with her boyfriend's suicide; he commented that "I was very, very uncomfortable and nervous about it – I didn't think it was convincing. I thought the rhythm was very strange. I didn't think it was any good. And I didn't show it to anyone."

== Analysis ==
Morvern Callar has been analyzed as dealing with "the neoliberalization of working conditions from within" in the British Isles, using a polyphonic style of narrative depicting the overlapping yet abruptly changing lives of its characters to convey precarity; hence, "the absence of any collective organization in the novel further emphasizes the divisions that precarity creates". Warner himself drew the connection between the book and an exploration of Thatcherism in a 2011 interview.

== Reception ==
Complete Review looked at different reviews at the time of the novel's publication and noted its polarized reception, writing "Some thought Morvern was a fabulous representation of disaffected youth, others thought it simply mindless sensationalism." For example, Jennifer Kornreich, writing in a review for The New York Times, described the novel's "matter-of-fact amorality" as "quickly [growing] tiresome", while Kirkus Reviews called the novel "savage, yet serene" as well as "the raw, resilient voice of a generation". Kirkus went on to praise the then-emerging new generation of Scottish writers, with it, among other reviews written at the time of the book's publication, drawing a connection between Warner and Irvine Welsh.

== Awards and nominations ==
| Year | Association | Result | Ref(s). |
|---|---|---|---|
| 1996 | Somerset Maugham Award | Won | |
| 1997 | International Dublin Literary Award | Nominated | |

== Sequel ==
Warner's second novel, These Demented Lands (1998), is a surrealist sequel to Morvern Callar. Its tone and subject matter were inspired by the newfound success Warner enjoyed after his first novel and the desire to eclipse social realism and push boundaries.

== Reviews ==
- Dunn, Angus, review of Morvern Callar by Alan Warner, in Bryan, Tom, Northwords, Issue 7, Ross and Cromarty District Council, 1996, p. 33, ISSN 0964-6876
- Thomas, Michael J. (6 April 1997). "A youthful rebel's primitive, sensory journey". Milwaukee Journal Sentinel. Archived from the original on 15 July 2001.
