= Alan Warner (novelist) =

Scottish novelist

- Born: 1964 (age 61–62); Connel, Argyll, Scotland
- Education: Glasgow University
- Occupations: Author; professor
- Writing career
- Period: 1995–present
- Genre: Literary fiction

Alan Warner (born 1964) is a Scottish novelist who grew up in Connel, near Oban. He is best known for his novels Morvern Callar (1995), The Sopranos (1998) and its sequel The Stars in the Bright Sky (2010). Morvern Callar and The Sopranos were both adapted into films, while the latter was also adapted for stage.

== Early life ==
Warner's father, Frank Warner, was a Yorkshireman who served in World War Two. Warner's parents ran a coal delivery business in Mull, a shop in Kilchoan, and a small hotel in Oban, before in 1963 buying the 42-bedroom Marine Hotel, close to Oban ferry terminal. They were both in their forties when he was born. Around 1982 Warner's parents sold the hotel and retired to Spain.

He attended Oban High School and left it at sixteen years old, after which he started working on the railways as a shunter. His interest in reading was sparked when he was fifteen, after he bought three novels whose covers suggested stories with a sexual dimension: Charles Webb's The Graduate, André Gide's The Immoralist and Albert Camus' The Outsider. He explained in an interview with the Scottish Review of Books in 2011: "I had presumed novels were an art form which only happened elsewhere and had died out in Scotland around the time of Walter Scott. What a very curious but genuine assumption. On the other hand, I could argue this was because local bookshops were stuffed with Scott and not a single work of modern Scottish literature." After this he bought random Penguin Classics books from the local charity shop to read on his own.

After moving to London, he started studying at Ealing College in his early twenties. On his return to Scotland, he studied at Glasgow University, where he wrote a dissertation on Joseph Conrad and the theme of suicide. He then spent some time participating in the Spanish rave scene, before working in Scotland as a train driver's assistant, musician and barman.

== Novels and other fiction ==
Warner's debut novel, the critically acclaimed Morvern Callar (1995), won a Somerset Maugham Award. It was followed by a sequel, These Demented Lands (1997), which won the Encore Award. His third novel The Sopranos (1998) won the Saltire Society's Scottish Book of the Year Award.

Since then he has published The Man Who Walks (2002), an imaginative and surreal black comedy; The Worms Can Carry Me to Heaven (2006), which imagines the reminiscences of a sickly Spanish playboy; The Stars in the Bright Sky (2010), a sequel to The Sopranos; The Deadman's Pedal (2012), a semi-autobiographical coming-of-age novel set in 1973-4; Their Lips Talk of Mischief (2015), a comedy about two aspiring writers in Thatcher's Britain; and Kitchenly 434 (2021), a comedic satire set in the 1970s about a British rock star and the caretaker of his country house retreat. In 2023 Polygon Books released Warner's Nothing Left to Fear From Hell, a retelling of Charles Edward Stuart's escape from Culloden, as part of its Darkland Tales series.

His novella After the Vision appeared in the anthology Children of Albion Rovers (1997), and his short story "Bitter Salvage" was included in Disco Biscuits (1997), an anthology edited by Sarah Champion.

== Adaptations of his work ==
Morvern Callar has been adapted as a film, directed by Lynne Ramsay and released in 2002. The Sopranos has been adapted for the screen by Alan Sharp and Michael Caton-Jones. Released under the title Our Ladies in 2019, it was directed by Caton-Jones.

A play by Lee Hall, Our Ladies of Perpetual Succour, was based on The Sopranos and premiered in 2015, directed by Vicky Featherstone and featuring live songs.

== Recurring motifs and influences ==
Multiple of Warner's novels are set in "The Port", a fictionalized version of Oban. He is known to appreciate the 1970s krautrock band Can; Three of his books feature dedications to former band members (Morvern Callar to Holger Czukay,The Man Who Walks to Michael Karoli and Kitchenly 434 to Irmin Schmidt). Finally in 2015 Bloomsbury Publishing published a 33 1/3 book written by Warner on Can's 1971 album Tago Mago. In 2021 Warner shared that he was selected by Schmidt and Mute Records to listen to 120 hours of live performances and help select the best ones to be released as live albums. As of November 2024 the series has reached six releases of recordings of different live shows played from 1973 to 1977.

Warner has been deeply influenced by existentialist fiction such as that of Jean-Paul Sartre and Albert Camus. In an interview with Zoë Strachan Warner shared how novels such as The Stranger and Nausea have shaped Morvern Callar. Another book Warner noted as leaving "a strong impact" on him was Alan Paton's Cry, the Beloved Country. He later went on to mention James Kelman, Samuel Beckett, Ian McDiarmid as strong influences, especially but not limited to his use of Scots in his books and what he referred to as writing "anti-novels".

== Personal life and teaching career ==
Warner was appointed the writer-in-residence at the University of Edinburgh in 2011. In 2019, he became senior lecturer in creative writing at the University of Aberdeen.

He was a member of the jury for the 2016 Scotiabank Giller Prize.

Warner is a supporter of Scottish independence. He is married and met his wife Holly in Spain.

== Works ==
Novels

- 1995 – Morvern Callar
- 1997 – These Demented Lands
- 1998 – The Sopranos
- 2002 – The Man Who Walks
- 2006 – The Worms Can Carry Me To Heaven
- 2010 – The Stars in the Bright Sky
- 2012 – The Deadman's Pedal
- 2014 – Their Lips Talk of Mischief
- 2021 – Kitchenly 434
- 2023 – Nothing Left to Fear from Hell

Short story collections

- 2020 – The Seal Club (co-written with Irvine Welsh and John King)
- 2023 – Seal Club 2: The View From Poacher's Hill (co-written with Irvine Welsh and John King)

Non-fiction

- 2015 – Tago Mago: Permission to Dream

Music

- 1998 – Superstar Vs Alan Warner EP (A collaboration with Scottish band Superstar)

== Acclaim and awards ==
Warner's first three novels all won awards, notably a Somerset Maugham Award for Morvern Callar. In 2003, he was named by Granta as one of twenty "Best of Young British Novelists". In 2010, his novel The Stars in the Bright Sky was included in the longlist for the Man Booker Prize. In 2013, he was awarded the James Tait Black Memorial Prize for his novel The Deadman's Pedal. He was elected a Fellow of the Royal Society of Literature the same year.

Warner's literary archive is held at the National Library of Scotland.

== See also ==
- List of Scottish writers
