= Presence (play) =

Play written by David Harrower

- Author: David Harrower
- Series: FF Plays
- Published: 2001 (Faber and Faber)
- Publication place: United Kingdom
- Media type: Print
- Pages: 76
- ISBN: 9780571210596
- Dewey Decimal: 822.914
- LC Class: PR6058.A69455 P74

Presence
- Original language: English
- Written by: David Harrower
- Characters: George; Paul; Pete; Marian; Elke
- Subject: The Beatles in Hamburg
- Setting: Hamburg, Germany, 1960

Premiere
- Date: 19 April 2001
- Place: Royal Court Theatre Upstairs, London

Presence is the third full-length play by Scottish playwright David Harrower. It portrays a fictionalised account of the Beatles' first residency in Hamburg.

== Plot ==
Pete Best, George Harrison and Paul McCartney share a room as they play the Indra Club (John Lennon and Stuart Sutcliffe are off-stage characters). Pete, newly joined to the group, is shown as an outsider, the diffident George, the youngest of the group, contrasts to the domineering Paul. The play ends as George is arrested for being out after the curfew imposed on minors in Hamburg (in real life he had lied to the German authorities about his age in order to be allowed to stay in Hamburg). The group play to dwindling audiences until Paul, angry at the band's lack of success and at being told that club owner Bruno Koschmider was in the Panzer division, begins sending up Nazism – wearing jackboots and crying “Sieg Heil” – which attracts a young audience to the club. That the Beatles are reported actually to have done this, coupled with Harrower's desire to write about the dynamics of a band were the origins of the play. The play alludes to events that followed this – Pete and Paul raised a small fire in their room – by having an older German woman, whose knowledge of the Nazi past counterpoints the young men's ignorance, set fire to a jacket hanging on the wall.

== Stage history ==
The play's première was at London's Royal Court, at the smaller 60-seat Theatre Upstairs, on 19 April 2001. The director was James Kerr, the designer was Rae Smith, the assistant director was Nina Raine, company voice work was by Patsy Rodenburg.

The cast was:

George – Ralf Little
Paul – William Ash
Pete – Michael Legge
Marian – Sarah Woodward
Elke – Christine Tremarco

The production received mixed to good reviews.

== Play text ==
The play text was published by Faber and Faber and has been translated into Czech.
