= National Theatre of Scotland =

National theatre company of Scotland

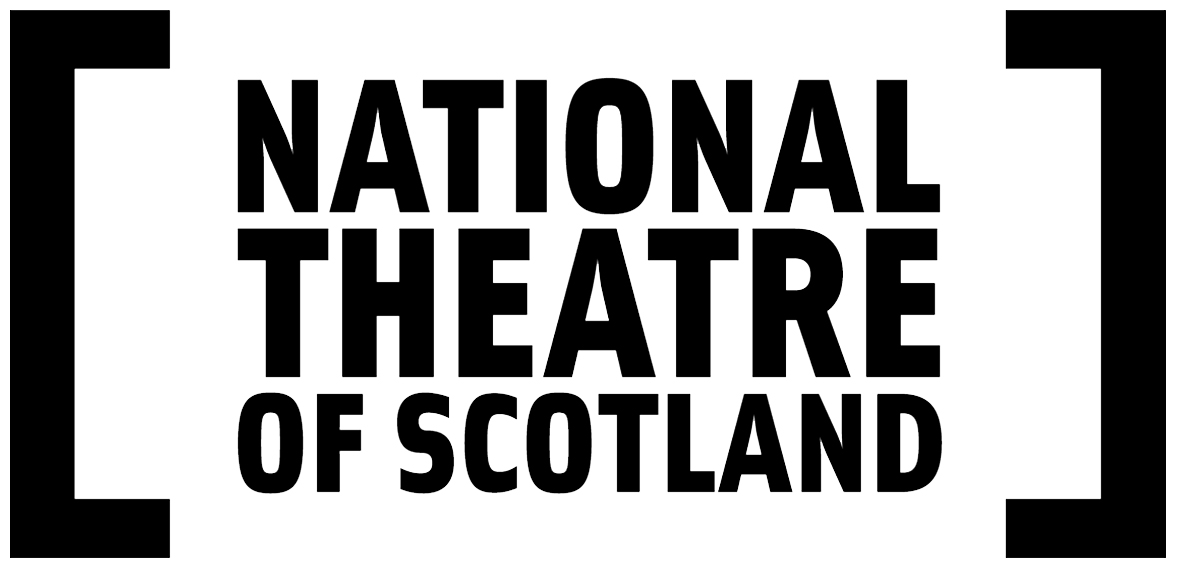
- The logo of the National Theatre of Scotland
- Formation: 2006
- Type: Theatre group
- Artistic director: Jackie Wylie (2017–present)
- Website: nationaltheatrescotland.com

The National Theatre of Scotland, established in 2006, is the national theatre company of Scotland. NTS operates as a "Theatre Without Walls", having no dedicated theatre building of its own. Instead, it tours to theatres, village halls, schools and site-specific theatre locations, both at home and internationally.

The company has created over 200 productions and collaborates with other theatre companies, local authorities, and individual artists to create a variety of performances, from large-scale productions through to theatre specifically made for the smallest venues.

Many different spaces have been used for productions, as well as conventional theatres: airports and tower blocks, community halls and drill halls, ferries and forests.

The creation of a national theatre was one of the commitments of the Scottish Executive's National Cultural Strategy.

== Formation ==
After Scottish devolution in 1997, long-discussed plans for a national theatre for Scotland began to come to fruition. In 2000, the Scottish Executive invited the Scottish Arts Council to conduct a feasibility study into a Scottish national theatre, and an independent working group subsequently reported in May 2001. The chosen model for a National Theatre of Scotland (NTS) was a commissioning theatre, a "theatre without walls", with no need for a new theatre building or a permanent company of actors, but making use of existing theatre buildings, actors and technical staff to create new work to be staged in venues throughout Scotland and internationally.

In September 2003, the Scottish Executive announced confirmed funding of £7.5M for the establishment of the NTS, with £3.5M for the year April 2004 to March 2005 and £4M for the following year. Robert Findlay, once Chief Executive of Scottish Radio Holdings, was appointed as chairman, and once a Board had also been appointed, the search for the first Artistic Director for the NTS began.

== Artistic direction ==
Vicky Featherstone was the founding artistic director and held the post from before the theatre's launch in 2006, to 2013.

Laurie Sansom took up the post in March 2013. His resignation was announced in April 2016.

Jackie Wylie, former artistic director of The Arches in Glasgow, was appointed as artistic director of the National Theatre of Scotland in Spring 2017.

In September 2025, Liam Sinclair formally took up the post of executive director and co-chief executive.

== Notable productions ==
Black Watch (2006) by Gregory Burke which won four Laurence Olivier Awards and multiple international awards.

Macbeth (2012) starring Alan Cumming, presented in Glasgow and at the Lincoln Center Festival and subsequently, Broadway, New York.

Let The Right One In (2013), adapted by Jack Thorne from John Ajvide Lindqvist's novel and screenplay, which won the 2014 South Bank Sky Arts Award for theatre.

The James Plays (2014), a historical trilogy by Rona Munro, which won the Evening Standard Theatre Award 2014 for Best Play.

Our Ladies of Perpetual Succour (2015), adapted by Lee Hall, based on the 1998 novel The Sopranos by Alan Warner. The production won a Scotsman Fringe First Award, a Herald Angel Award and a Stage Award for Acting Excellence during its opening run at the Edinburgh Festival Fringe.

Enough of Him (2022) by May Sumbwanyambe about the life of Joseph Knight won awards for Best Play, Best Director and Best Production at the 2023 Critics' Awards for Theatre in Scotland and for Best play at the UK Theatre Awards.

The company's production of David Harrower's adaptation of Muriel Spark's novel, The Prime of Miss Jean Brodie, directed by Vicky Featherstone, with Gayle Rankin in the title role, toured Scottish theatres in the autumn of 2026.

== Europe Theatre Prize ==
In 2016, the National Theatre of Scotland was awarded the XIII Europe Prize Theatrical Realities, in Craiova, with the following motivation:

The National Theatre of Scotland was created to appeal to a very wide audience and exists to work with it, with the particular feature, going beyond any sort of all-embracing populist approach, that it should manage to produce and take on tour first-class theatre. Its ambitions are to create work that arouses a strong response, that entertains and stimulates the audience with the precise cultural and social objective of not acting conventionally and inviting discussion of the central idea of what can be achieved through theatre.

== See also ==
- Theatre of Scotland
