= Nic Green =

- Education: Royal Conservatoire of Scotland
- Notable work: Trilogy
- Awards: Forced Entertainment Award

Nic Green is a performance maker and activist, brought up in Yorkshire, but based in Glasgow. Her work is based on the environment, social responsibility and relationships. She is well known for her use of nudity on stage, for example Trilogy (2009–2010), which is a two-hour show in three parts. It is a feminist, political statement on the body where she, three other women and a man are naked for the duration of it as well as asking members of the audience to take their clothes off too.

== Life ==
Nic Green graduated from the Royal Conservatoire of Scotland in 2005 with a Bachelor of Arts in Contemporary Performance Practises.

She often focusses her work within communities and public arts with her areas of influence and research being varied and cross many disciplines from Systems Thinking to Jungian Synchronicity. Her past projects have been about spaces, about radical and engaged and making the political more accessible. For example, she led a project in collaboration with Artsadmin titled 'Make Space' in 2013 and was four-week project challenging ideas on how people see and experience the space around us.

She was the recipient of the inaugural Forced Entertainment Award, in memory of Huw Chadbourn for 2018 and was also the 2018 Artist in Residence at National Theatre Scotland.

== Works ==
Some of her earlier works include:

- Saccades (2005)
- Trilogy (2010)
- Slowlo (2012)
- Fatherland (2013)
- Shadowlands (2013)
- Cock and Bull (2017)
