= May Sumbwanyambe =

May Sumbwanyambe is a playwright, radio dramatist, and academic from Edinburgh, Scotland.

His play Enough of Him about the life of Joseph Knight won awards for Best Play at the 2023 Critics' Awards for Theatre in Scotland and at the UK Theatre Awards. His other works include After Independence, a play set on a white-owned farm in Zimbabwe in 1998.
