= Critics' Awards for Theatre in Scotland =

Annual awards event in Scotland

The Critics' Awards for Theatre in Scotland (CATS) are an annual event awarding performances "substantially produced in Scotland, or developed, rehearsed and premiered in Scotland".

== Awards ceremony ==
The ceremony is itinerant in terms of location, switching between theatre venues across Scotland – for example, in 2007 the ceremony was hosted by Pitlochry Festival Theatre, while in 2019 the event was held at Tramway (arts centre) in Glasgow. Other venues have included Perth Theatre and Edinburgh Festival Theatre.

The Awards Ceremony, which normally takes place on the second Sunday in June, is open to the general public, not just members of Scotland's theatre industry.

Awards covering the 2019-20 theatre season, which was curtailed by the COVID-19 pandemic in Scotland, were belatedly announced in November 2020.

In 2022 the awards ceremony took place at the Tron Theatre, Glasgow.

In 2023 the awards ceremony took place at the Traverse Theatre, Edinburgh.

In 2024 the awards ceremony took place at the Theatre Royal, Glasgow.

== Judges ==
The judges are invited critics who write regularly on theatre across Scotland, for print and/or online publications.

The critics as of 2025 are:

Joyce McMillan (The Scotsman); Mark Brown (The Daily Telegraph, The National); Michael Cox (Across The Arts); Anna Burnside (Freelance Journalist); Mark Fisher (The Guardian); Natalie O'Donoghue (BroadwayWorld); Thom Dibdin (The Stage); Mary Brennan (The Herald); Dominic Corr (Corr Blimey!); Allan Radcliffe (The Times); Fergus Morgan (The Stage); David Pollock (Freelance Journalist); Hugh Simpson (All Edinburgh Theatre).

== Award categories ==
The first CATS, in June 2003 (covering productions between May 2002 to April 2003) announced five awards: Best Production; Best Male Performance; Best Female Performance; Best Design; and Best New Play.

Five additional categories were subsequently added: Best Director; Best Technical Presentation; Best Production for Children and Young People; Best Ensemble; and Best Music and Sound.

For the 2023 awards the Best Male Performance and Best Female Performance were renamed as one category- Outstanding Performance. Outstanding Performance sees eight nominees of all genders and two overall winners.

Previous CATS winners include actors David Tennant and Blythe Duff, productions of Blackbird (play) and Black Watch (play), and theatre companies including Catherine Wheels Theatre Company and the National Theatre of Scotland.

== The CATS Whiskers ==
The "CATS Whiskers" are awarded – only occasionally – to individuals or organisations whom the judges believe have made a significant contribution to theatre in Scotland.

In 2003 the first ever CATS Whiskers award was presented as a 'special honour' to Giles Havergal, in recognition of the 34 years he spent as artistic director of the Citizen's Theatre.

The 2012 CATS Whiskers award was awarded to David MacLennan and A Play, A Pie and A Pint. At the time of the award, 250 new plays had been staged in eight years creating a whole new dimension of opportunity, both for young writers starting out, and for established writers keen to try something new.

The 2013 recipient of the CATS Whiskers award was founding artistic director of the National Theatre of Scotland Vicky Featherstone, for an outstanding contribution to Scottish Theatre.

In 2014 the CATS Whiskers was awarded to Imaginate Festival for outstanding achievement in 25 years of excellent programming.

In 2015 the CATS Whiskers award was awarded to Junction 25, celebrating their 10th anniversary of creating theatre that is made to reflect the thoughts, ideas and preoccupations of the 25 young people who form the company at any one time, yet is also shaped by directors Jess Thorpe and Tashi Gore into beautiful, world-class performance, often featuring superb light, sound and movement.

The 2016 recipient was Muriel Romanes in 2016,[4] for "supporting and strengthening women's role in Scottish theatre", most notably as the first artistic director[5] of Stellar Quines Theatre Company.

In 2022 the CATS Whiskers was awarded to the entire Scottish Theatre Community for their resilience, dedication and vision throughout the Covid pandemic.

In 2023 The CATS Whiskers was awarded to The Cheviot, The Stag And The Black for 50 years of "outstanding" influence on Scottish Theatre.

In 2024 The CATS Whiskers was awarded to Andy Arnold in recognition of his contribution to Scottish Theatre.

== Awards for 2019-2020 ==
The 18th CATS (for 2019-2020) were announced through a press release embargoed until 00:01 on Thursday 12 November 2020. The traditional public awards ceremony had been cancelled due to ongoing COVID-19 restrictions.

Best New Play: Peter Arnott, The Signalman, A Play, A Pie & A Pint in association with Traverse Theatre.

Best Production: The Signalman, A Play, A Pie & A Pint in association with Traverse Theatre.

Best Female Performance: Anna Russell-Martin (Anais Hendricks), The Panopticon, National Theatre of Scotland

Best Male Performance: Tom McGovern (Thomas Barclay), The Signalman, A Play, A Pie & A Pint in association with Traverse Theatre.

Best Ensemble: Thank You Very Much, Manchester International Festival & National Theatre of Scotland.

Best Director: Elizabeth Newman, Faith Healer, Pitlochry Festival Theatre.

Best Design: Joint Winners: Shona Reppe, Atlantis Banal: Beneath the Surface, created with Vélo Théâtre, France, produced by Catherine Wheels, and Hyemi Shin (set and costume), Paul Jackson (lighting), Tov Belling and Katie Milwright (cinematography), Toby Angwin (visual effects); and Solaris, Royal Lyceum Theatre Edinburgh, Malthouse Theatre and the Lyric Hammersmith Theatre.

Best Music and Sound: Matthias Hermann (sound designer and composer), Thank You Very Much, Manchester International Festival and National Theatre of Scotland.

Best Technical Presentation: Solaris, Royal Lyceum Theatre Edinburgh, Malthouse Theatre and the Lyric Hammersmith Theatre.

Best Production for Children and Young People: Atlantis Banal: Beneath the Surface, created with Vélo Théâtre, France, produced by Catherine Wheels.

== Awards for 2021-2022 ==
The 2022 winners were announced at the Tron Theatre on Sunday 11 September. Special guest presenter was Dolina MacLennan.

Best New Play: David Greig "Adventures With The Painted People" (Pitlochry Festival Theatre).

Best Production: 'Medea' (Bard In the Botanics)

Best Female Performance: Nicole Cooper (Medea) 'Medea' (Bard in the Botanics)

Best Male Performance: Lorn Macdonald (Segismundo) 'Life Is A Dream' (Royal Lyceum Theatre)

Best Ensemble: The Comedy of Errors (Citizens Theatre)

Best Director: Wils Wilson 'Life Is A Dream' (Royal Lyceum Theatre)

Best Design: Georgia McGuinness, Alex Berry and Kai Fischer 'Life Is A Dream' (Royal Lyceum Theatre)

Best Music and Sound: John Kielty, Garry Boyle, Calum and Rory MacDonald 'The Stamping Ground' (Raw Material and Eden Court Theatre)

Best Technical Presentation: Orphans (National Theatre of Scotland)

Best Production for Children and Young People: I Am Tiger (Perth Theatre and Imaginate)

== Awards for 2022-2023 ==
The 2023 winners were announced on Sunday 11th June at the Traverse Theatre in Edinburgh. Special guest presenters were Grant Stott and Shauna MacDonald.

Best New Play: Enough of Him by May Sumbwanyambe (National Theatre of Scotland and Pitlochry Festival Theatre)

Best Production: 'Enough of Him' (National Theatre of Scotland and Pitlochry Festival Theatre)

Outstanding Performance: David Hayman (Eric) 'Cyprus Avenue' (Tron Theatre)

Outstanding Performance: Sally Reid (Shirley Valentine) 'Shirley Valentine' (Pitlochry Festival Theatre)

Best Ensemble: Castle Lennox (Royal Lyceum Theatre)

Best Director: Orla O'Loughlin 'Enough of Him' (National Theatre of Scotland and Pitlochry Festival Theatre)

Best Design: Tom Piper, Alex Berry and Lizzie Powell for 'Macbeth (An Undoing)' (Royal Lyceum Theatre)

Best Music and Sound: David Paul Jones 'Love Beyond (Act of Remembrance)' (Tron Theatre and Raw Material)

Best Technical Presentation: 'Love Beyond (Act of Remembrance)' (Tron Theatre and Raw Material)

Best Production for Children and Young People: 'The Gift' (The Studio, Edinburgh)

== Awards for 2023-2024 ==
The 2024 winners were announced at the Theatre Royal, Glasgow on Sunday 16th June. Special guest presenter was Damian Barr.

Best New Play: Douglas Maxwell 'The Sheriff of Kalamaki' (A Play, A Pie and A Pint)

Best Production: 'Escaped Alone' (Tron Theatre)

Outstanding Performance: Gill Robertson (Various) 'Lightning Ridge' (Catherine Wheels)

Outstanding Performance: Paul McCole (Dion) 'The Sheriff of Kalamaki' (A Play, A Pie and A Pint)

Best Ensemble: 'Escaped Alone' (Tron Theatre)

Best Director: Joanna Bowman 'Escaped Alone' (Tron Theatre)

Best Design: Anna Karenina (Royal Lyceum Theatre)

Best Music and Sound: 'Ragnarok' (Tortoise in a Nutshell co-production with Figurteatret i Nordland and in association with MacRobert Arts Centre)

Best Technical Presentation: 'Ragnarok' – Tortoise in a Nutshell co-production with Figurteatret i Nordland and in association with MacRobert Arts Centre

Best Production for Children and Young People: 'Lightning Ridge' (Catherine Wheels)
