= Lost Lear =

Stage play by Dan Colley

- Original language: English
- Written by: Dan Colley
- Characters: Joy / King Leir; Conor / Cordelia; Liam / The Fool
- Genre: Drama
- Setting: Present day. An assisted care center.

Premiere
- Date: 2022
- Place: Dublin Theatre Festival, Ireland.

Lost Lear is a dramatic stage play written by Irish playwright Dan Colley.

== Synopsis ==
Joy, a former actress, is in an assisted care facility and living with dementia. Her carers have identified a happy, fulfilling memory from her past, William Shakespeare's King Lear, and are actively keeping her living in that past. When her estranged son Conor comes to visit her, she does not remember him. Liam, her primary carer, tries to encourage him to play the role of Cordelia within Joy's reality.

== Original cast and characters ==
Character	Original cast	Irish tour cast	North America tour cast	Broadway
Character	2022	2023	2025	2027
Joy	Venetia Bowe	Venetia Bowe	Venetia Bowe	Jessica Chastain
Conor	Peter Daly	Peter Daly	Peter Daly	Corey Stoll
Liam	Manus Halligan	Manus Halligan	Manus Halligan	Michael Urie
Ensemble	Clodagh O’Farrell	Clodagh O’Farrell	Clodagh O’Farrell	
Ensemble	Em Ormonde	Em Ormonde	Em Ormonde	

== Production history ==
Colley's grandmother lived with dementia and he spent his youth visiting her at her assisted care facility. Colley did a large amount of research and interviews with those living with the disease and caregivers and doctors who treat the disease.

The play was first workshopped and performed at the Riverbank Arts Centre, where Colley was a resident artist. The play was then performed at the 2022 Dublin Theatre Festival. The show was then produced at the Mermaid Arts Centre. The play was developed in support by the Irish Arts Council, the Abbey Theatre, and the Fishamble New Play Company. Beginning in 2023, the play was toured at several theatres throughout Ireland. In 2024, the show was performed as part of the 2024 New Zealand Festival of the Arts.

The North American premiere took place February 13, 2025 at Villanova University, as a part of their Center for Irish Studies program. In the summer of 2025, the play had its U.K. premiere at the 2025 Edinburgh International Film Festival.

In the fall of 2025, the play returned to the United States and toured at several colleges with writer Dan Colley in attendance, including Connecticut College, Fairfield University, and University of North Carolina at Chapel Hill.

In 2026, the play was performed at Open The Door International Festival in Poland.

In January 2027, the play will be performed at the College of Charleston.. In April 2027, it is scheduled to be performed at Broadstage in Santa Monica, California.

In August 2025, the play script was published by Methuen Publishing.

The play won an Edinburgh Fringe First Award in 2025.

On November 11, 2026, it was announced the play would premiere on Broadway in 2027, starring Jessica Chastain as Joy, Corey Stoll as Conor, and Michael Urie as Liam. Performances are set to begin at the Booth Theatre on March 29 ahead of an April 23 opening night.
