= Enough of Him =

Play by May Sumbwanyambe

Enough of Him is a Scottish play about slavery. Written by May Sumbwanyambe, it tells the true story of Joseph Knight, an enslaved African man who won his freedom following a landmark court case in Scotland. The play was developed by the National Theatre of Scotland and Pitlochry Festival Theatre. It won three awards at the 2023 Critics' Awards for Theatre in Scotland, including Best Production, Best Play, and Best Director.

== Reception ==
Writing for The Guardian, Mark Fisher described Enough of Him as "written economically in spare, fragile scenes", noting that it "refuses to be celebratory" despite Knight's victory in court.
