= The Mistress Contract =

Play written by Abi Morgan

The Mistress Contract is a 2014 play by British playwright Abi Morgan. It is based on a real-life couple in which the woman (known only as She) agreed to provide "mistress services" to the man (known only as He) in return for an income and a home.

It premiered at the Royal Court Theatre in London from 30 January to 22 March 2014, directed by Vicky Featherstone, and with the two parts of She and He played by Saskia Reeves and Danny Webb.
