= Swimmer One =

Scottish band

- Origin: Edinburgh, Scotland
- Genres: Alternative rock Indie; Electropop; Pop
- Years active: 2002–present
- Labels: Biphonic, Dogbox
- Members: Hamish Brown, Andrew Eaton, Laura Cameron Lewis
- Website: www.swimmerone.co.uk

Swimmer One is a Scottish band founded in 2002 by Hamish Brown and Andrew Eaton. Laura Cameron Lewis joined the line-up in 2007.

== Career ==
Brown's influences included Kraftwerk, Neu!, Cluster, To Rococo Rot and Tarwater, while Eaton drew inspiration from acts such as OMD, Kate Bush, Kitchens of Distinction, A-ha and the Pet Shop Boys. Swimmer One's music has been categorised as indie, pop music and indietronica and variously been compared to the Associates, Pulp, Belle and Sebastian and the Pet Shop Boys.

In September 2007 Swimmer One released their first album, The Regional Variations, on their own label, Biphonic Records. Their second album, Dead Orchestras, was released on 31 May 2010. They have also released four singles: "We Just Make Music For Ourselves", "Come On, Let's Go!" and "The Balance Company", all on Biphonic Records, and "Largs Hum" on London's Dogbox Records.

In 2006, Swimmer One collaborated with Edinburgh-based theatre group Highway Diner on a show entitled We Just Make Music For Ourselves which was performed in Glasgow, Edinburgh and Biella, Italy.

In 2012, Swimmer One worked with theatre director Cora Bissett and playwright David Greig to create Whatever Gets You Through The Night, a live show, film, book and album featuring new night-time inspired work by over 20 Scottish musicians and writers. The live show ran for a week at the Arches in Glasgow in June 2012, and was later revived as part of the Made in Scotland showcase at the 2013 Edinburgh Festival Fringe.

Film-maker Daniel Warren has made several films featuring Swimmer One's music which have been screened at film festivals worldwide including the Edinburgh Film Festival and Cannes Film Festival, and also collaborated with the band on Whatever Gets You Through The Night. Hamish and Daniel also worked together on the film Public Private, commissioned by Scottish Ballet and the National Galleries of Scotland, and directed by Daniel with a musical score by Hamish. Laura and Andrew have also worked together outside of Swimmer One, creating two theatre shows for The Arches in Glasgow.

The song "But My Heart Is Broken" from Swimmer One's album The Regional Variations featured in the 2009 film, Spread, starring Ashton Kutcher and Anne Heche and directed by David Mackenzie.

== Discography ==
=== Albums ===
- The Regional Variations – 2007
- Dead Orchestras – 2010

=== Singles ===
- "We Just Make Music For Ourselves" – 2002
- "Come On, Let's Go!" – 2003
- "Largs Hum" – 2005 (digital single on Dogbox Records)
- "The Balance Company" – 2008
