= Blackbird (play) =

2005 play by David Harrower

- Script cover
- Original language: English
- Written by: David Harrower
- Characters: Una Spencer; Ray Brooks
- Subject: An uneasy reunion between a woman and a middle-aged man fifteen years after he sexually abused her when she was twelve
- Genre: Drama
- Setting: Office break room

Premiere
- Date: 2005
- Place: Edinburgh Festival; Edinburgh, Scotland

Blackbird is a 2005 play written by Scottish playwright David Harrower. It was inspired in part by the crimes of sex offender Toby Studebaker, and depicts a young woman meeting a middle-aged man fifteen years after being sexually abused by him when she was twelve.

David Harrower's Blackbird is not to be confused with the Adam Rapp play of the same name.

== Synopsis ==
At his workplace, 55-year-old Ray Brooks is shocked to be visited by a young woman, 27-year-old Una Spencer. Fifteen years earlier, Ray had sexually assaulted Una for three months when Una was twelve and Ray was forty; subsequently, Ray had been jailed for three years for statutory rape. Ultimately, they ran off together, and, while Ray was taking time to compose himself after realising what he had just done, he left her alone in a motel room. She got worried and left to find him, which led to both of them frantically searching for one another and raising suspicions within the small coastal town where they were staying. Eventually, a couple out walking their dog took Una in and called the police after learning why she was there. Ray was then arrested and imprisoned. Upon his release, he managed to establish a reasonably successful new life under another name, but Una recognised him in a photograph and tracked him down.

Ray takes Una to the office break room, where the two engage in a long and difficult confrontation involving Una's continuing struggles to understand and come to terms with the abuse and her intensely conflicting emotions, which pivot between anger, curiosity, confusion, and even a persistent attachment to Ray, whom Una loved – and she believed that he loved her. The fearful Ray, who is himself trying to forget the past and the potential feelings he had for Una, parries her demanding questions and descriptions of her feelings and experiences, all the while uncertain of her intentions.

== Cast and characters ==
Character	Theatrical debut 2005	Off-Broadway debut 2007	Broadway debut 2016	Film adaptation 2016
Una	Jodhi May	Alison Pill	Michelle Williams	Rooney Mara
Ray	Roger Allam	Jeff Daniels	Jeff Daniels	Ben Mendelsohn

== Productions ==
Blackbird was commissioned by the Edinburgh International Festival and the Institute for Advanced Studies in the Humanities at the University of Edinburgh, with a 2005 premiere at the festival, directed by Peter Stein. In February 2006, it opened at the West End Albery Theatre with Roger Allam and Jodhi May. In September 2006, it was well received in Stockholm at Dramaten (Royal Dramatic Theatre), in a co-production with Helsingborg City Theatre, directed by Eva Dahlman; with Göran Stangertz and Anna Björk.

In the spring of 2007, the play had simultaneous American premieres by the Manhattan Theatre Club (off-Broadway) and at American Conservatory Theater in San Francisco. The New York production was directed by Joe Mantello, and featured Jeff Daniels and Alison Pill in the lead roles.

In April 2008, the play was revived by David Grindley at the Rose Theatre, Kingston, prior to a national tour of the UK.

In March 2008, the play opened in Mumbai, India, starring Indian film and theatre veterans Akash Khurana and Shernaz Patel. This Akvarious production was also later presented in Bangalore and in New Delhi. Shernaz Patel went on to win the award for Best Actress, for her portrayal of Una, at the 2010 Mahindra Excellence in Theatre Awards.

A 2016 Broadway revival was mounted at the Belasco Theatre on 5 February 2016 (37 previews), and opened officially on 10 March (through 11 June 108 performances), starring Michelle Williams and Jeff Daniels. It was directed by Joe Mantello, and received critical acclaim.

Blackbird had a South Korean run on 13 October to 13 November 2016, at the DCF Daemyung Culture Factory Theater in Seoul's Jongno District. Cho Jae-hyun portrayed Ray while Chae Soo-bin and Ok Ja-yeon were alternates in the role of Una.

In 2021 Blackbird premiered in Tbilisi, Georgia, at Theathre on Atoneli by Georgian theatre director Gega Gagnidze.

In August 2023 the play was produced by Everything's Rosie Theatre Company for a limited run at South London Theatre in West Norwood, starring Katie Forster as Una and James Sutherland as Ray.

In February 2024 the play was produced by the Bingley Little Theatre in Bingley, West Yorkshire, England. In April 2024, Solus Productions presented the play at Holden Street Theatres in Adelaide, Australia.

A new Canadian production by Talk Is Free Theatre, directed by Dean Deffett and starring Kirstyn Russelle and starring Cyrus Lane, was critically acclaimed and had a successful run in Barrie, Ontario in March 2025 before remounting in Toronto in November 2025.

== Awards and nominations ==
Year	Award	Category	Nominee	Result	Ref.
2006	Critics' Awards for Theatre in Scotland	Best New Play	Blackbird	Won	
2007	Laurence Olivier Awards	Best New Play	Blackbird	Won	
2016	Tony Awards	Best Revival of a Play	Blackbird	Nominated	
2016	Tony Awards	Best Actor in a Play	Jeff Daniels	Nominated	
2016	Tony Awards	Best Actress in a Play	Michelle Williams	Nominated	

== Film adaptation ==
A film adaptation of the play titled Una premiered in September 2016 at the 43rd Telluride Film Festival. It stars Rooney Mara as Una and Ben Mendelsohn as Ray.
