= Our Ladies of Perpetual Succour =

2015 play by Lee Hall based on the 1998 novel The Sopranos by Alan Warner,

- Official poster of the 2017 West End production
- Original language: English
- Written by: Lee Hall

Premiere
- Date: 19 August 2015
- Place: Traverse Theatre, Edinburgh

Our Ladies of Perpetual Succour is a play based on the 1998 novel The Sopranos by Alan Warner, adapted for the stage by Lee Hall. It received its world premiere at the Traverse Theatre, Edinburgh, in August 2015, before embarking on a short UK tour. The play is a co-production between the National Theatre of Scotland and Live Theatre. The production ran at London's National Theatre in August 2016 and was scheduled to transfer to the West End's Duke of York's Theatre in May 2017.

In April 2017, the production won the Laurence Olivier Award for Best New Comedy, for its run at the National Theatre.

== Production history ==
Our Ladies of Perpetual Succour has been adapted for the stage by Lee Hall, based on the 1998 novel The Sopranos by Alan Warner. Set over the course of a single day the book follows a choir of Catholic school girls on a trip to Edinburgh for a competition. On 15 May 2015, it was announced the play would receive its world premiere the same year at the Traverse Theatre, Edinburgh, as part of the Edinburgh Festival Fringe. The play reunited the National Theatre of Scotland with former artistic and founding director Vicky Featherstone, who left the company in 2012. Featherstone wished to stage the play whilst still with the National Theatre of Scotland, but due to issues with the novels rights was unable to. Hall, having read the book when it was first published, also felt he wished to adapt it. Featherstone and Hall met at the Evening Standard Awards around eight years prior to the play's official announcement and the idea was reignited.

Prior to opening, the play received a preview performance at the Platform, Glasgow on 15 August 2015, before transferring to the Traverse for one final preview on 18 August, receiving its world premiere performance on 19 August. The play is directed by Featherstone with choreography by Imogen Knight, design by Chloe Lamford, lighting design by Lizzie Powell, musical arrangement by Martin Lowe and sound by Mike Walker. Following its premiere run, the play embarked on a UK tour in September and October 2015, visiting the Tron Theatre, Glasgow, Lemon Tree, Aberdeen, Eden Court Theatre, Inverness, Adam Smith Theatre, Kirkcaldy, Brunton Theatre, Musselburgh and Live Theatre, Newcastle, with whom the play is a co-production.

The script of Our Ladies of Perpetual Succour was published by Faber and Faber on 3 September 2015.

In January 2017, it was announced that Our Ladies Of Perpetual Succour was set to open at the Duke of York's Theatre in the West End on 15 May, running until 2 September 2017.

The novel has been adapted by Alan Sharp and Michael Caton-Jones for the screen titled Our Ladies and released in 2019.

== Music ==
The play features live music from a three-piece band and features a score of thirteen songs. The musical score was arranged by Tony Award winner Martin Lowe and features a range of music from classical to 1970's pop rock. On the show's music David Pollock, writing for The Independent, said that: "Martin Lowe’s musical choices are sublime, amplifying a heart that’s already there in abundance in the material" and that "the ensemble version of Shine a Little Love in a deserted nightclub is an air-punching moment."

=== Musical numbers ===
- "Lift Thine Eyes" by Felix Mendelssohn
- "Enchanting Song" by Béla Bartók
- "Mr. Blue Sky" by Electric Light Orchestra
- "The Brookside Theme" by Dave Roylance
- "My Heart Is Inditing" by George Frideric Handel
- "Long Black Road" by Electric Light Orchestra
- "For You" by Judie Tzuke
- "Sweet Talkin' Woman" by Electric Light Orchestra
- "Don't Bring Me Down" by Electric Light Orchestra
- "Oh Taste and See" by Ralph Vaughan Williams
- "Shine a Little Love" by Electric Light Orchestra
- "Agnus Dei" by Johann Sebastian Bach
- "Wild West Hero" by Electric Light Orchestra
- "Many Rivers To Cross" by Jimmy Cliff

== Principal roles and original cast ==
Original 2015 cast of Our Ladies of Perpetual Succour

Character	World premiere, 2015 and 2016 tour cast	National Theatre of Great Britain Cast	West End Cast 2017
Orla	Melissa Allan	Melissa Allan	Isis Hainsworth
Chell	Caroline Deyga	Caroline Deyga	Caroline Deyga
Kay	Karen Fishwick	Karen Fishwick	Karen Fishwick
Manda	Kirsty MacLaren	Kirsty MacLaren	Kirsty MacLaren
Kylah	Frances Mayli McCann	Frances Mayli McCann	Frances Mayli McCann
Fionnula	Dawn Sievewright	Dawn Sievewright	Dawn Sievewright

== Critical reception ==
The play has received generally positive reviews from critics.

The production won a Scotsman Fringe First Award, a Herald Angel Award and a Stage Award for Acting Excellence during its opening run at the Edinburgh Festival Fringe.
