= Emily Jenkins (playwright) =

British playwright and theatre director

- Occupations: Playwright, theatre director, Shakespeare text practitioner
- Known for: Rainbow, Cookies, Bobby & Amy
- Awards: Scotsman Fringe First Awards (2012, 2019)
- Website: emilyjenkins.studio

Emily Jenkins is a British playwright, theatre director and Shakespeare text practitioner. She is known for her plays Rainbow (2012) and Bobby & Amy (2019), both of which received The Scotsman Fringe First Awards at the Edinburgh Festival Fringe. Her work also includes Cookies (2017), a play exploring young people's experiences of social media and cyberbullying.

== Career ==
Jenkins studied English literature at university before training as a theatre director. Early in her career, she worked as an assistant text practitioner to Giles Block, Shakespeare's Globe's former Master of Words, subsequently moving into the theatre's higher education department, where she coached actors and directors in Shakespearean performance.

Jenkins wrote and directed Rainbow, which was performed at the 2012 Edinburgh Festival Fringe. The production received a Scotsman Fringe First Award, recognising new theatrical writing at the festival. The play received independent critical reviews, including a four-star review in The Scotsman and coverage by A Younger Theatre and TheatreGuide London.

In 2017, Jenkins wrote Cookies, a play commissioned through Cyberscene, an educational project involving the Theatre Royal Haymarket Masterclass Trust and the anti-bullying charity Kidscape. Developed from workshops with students at four London colleges, the play examined cyberbullying, online relationships, sexting and radicalisation. It was staged at the Theatre Royal Haymarket, directed by Anna Ledwich. Reviewing the production for British Theatre Guide, Howard Loxton commented on the authenticity of the teenage dialogue and its use of contemporary speech patterns.

Jenkins wrote and directed Bobby & Amy, which premiered at the 2019 Edinburgh Festival Fringe at the Pleasance Courtyard. Set during the 2001 United Kingdom foot-and-mouth outbreak, the play follows two socially isolated young people whose friendship develops amid the effects of the crisis on their rural community. The production starred Will Howard and Kimberley Jarvis, who portrayed the title characters alongside numerous supporting roles.

Bobby & Amy received a Scotsman Fringe First Award in 2019. In a four-star review for The Scotsman, Joyce McMillan discussed Jenkins's portrayal of rural life, social exclusion and changes to the English countryside. The Edinburgh production also received five-star reviews from ThreeWeeks and EdinburghGuide.com, four stars from Fest and a positive review in The Wee Review. The production subsequently toured in 2021, including a performance at the North Wall Arts Centre in Oxford. Reviewing the production for The Guardian, Mark Lawson compared its minimalist theatrical approach to the principles of Jerzy Grotowski's poor theatre and examined its treatment of the economic and psychological consequences of the foot-and-mouth outbreak. A separate production, directed by Sam Chittenden, was staged at Brighton Little Theatre in 2025.

In a 2026 interview with the podcast Shakespeare Anyone?, Jenkins connected the minimalist staging of Bobby & Amy to her work with Shakespearean text. She explained that the play's two performers portrayed 21 characters without conventional costumes, props or scenery, relying on language and physical performance to distinguish their roles.

Alongside her playwriting and directing, Jenkins has worked as a text practitioner at Shakespeare's Globe, with credits including The Tempest, A Midsummer Night's Dream and King Lear. She has also taught at the London Academy of Music and Dramatic Art and worked with the National Youth Theatre.

Her directing credits include productions of Vinegar Tom and The Merry Wives of Windsor at Royal & Derngate, Mojo Mickybo at the Old Red Lion Theatre and Fame at the Northcott Theatre. She has also participated in the Royal Court Theatre's Young Writers and Studio Writers programmes and undertaken writing work with Paines Plough and the Traverse Theatre.

Jenkins's approach to Shakespearean performance emphasises spoken language, physical action and the dramatic intentions of characters. In an interview in 2026, she advocated allowing actors to use their natural voices rather than adopting prescribed accents, and described Shakespeare's verse as a means of communicating character and action rather than primarily as poetry. She also discussed the role of text coaching in helping performers interpret Shakespeare's language without imposing a particular reading of the text.

== Selected works ==
Year	Title	Role	Notes
2012	Rainbow	Writer and director	Edinburgh Festival Fringe; Scotsman Fringe First Award
2017	Cookies	Writer	Theatre Royal Haymarket
2019	Bobby & Amy	Writer and director	Edinburgh Festival Fringe; Scotsman Fringe First Award; 2021 tour
