= Priyanka Shetty =

Indian-born actor and playwright

- Born: Bangalore, India
- Education: University of Virginia (MFA)
- Occupations: Actor, playwright, director
- Years active: 2019–present
- Notable work: The Elephant in the Room; #CHARLOTTESVILLE
- Website: www.priyankashetty.com

Priyanka Shetty is an Indian-born actor, playwright, and director based in Philadelphia, United States. She is known for the solo plays The Elephant in the Room (2019) and #CHARLOTTESVILLE (2025), the latter developed from interviews and documents about the 2017 Unite the Right rally in Charlottesville, Virginia, and later presented at the Edinburgh Festival Fringe.

== Early life and education ==
Shetty is from Bangalore, India. After working in software, she moved to the United States to train as an actor, earning an MFA in Acting from the University of Virginia (UVA). She has also served on the faculty of UVA's Department of Drama.

== Career ==
=== The Elephant in the Room ===
Shetty's one-woman show The Elephant in the Room premiered in 2019 and has toured widely in North America and the UK, including a performance at the John F. Kennedy Center's Millennium Stage and a run at the 2022 Edinburgh Festival Fringe.

=== #CHARLOTTESVILLE ===
Shetty developed #CHARLOTTESVILLE from more than one hundred interviews, court transcripts and news reports about the events at the 2017 Unite the Right rally in Charlottesville while she was an MFA student at UVA. The professional world premiere took place at the Keegan Theatre in Washington, D.C., in March 2025, directed by Yury Urnov in association with Voices Festival Productions. The UK premiere followed at the Pleasance Courtyard during the 2025 Edinburgh Festival Fringe.

== Critical reception ==
At the Edinburgh Fringe, The Guardian called Shetty's performance "polished and confident," highlighting the show's collage of perspectives and its exploration of discrimination. The Stage described it as a "solidly crafted documentary play" about the Unite the Right rally. The show also received The Scotsman's Fringe First Award for outstanding new writing premiered at the Edinburgh Fringe. Earlier in Washington, D.C., reviews noted the work's urgency and Shetty's multi-character performance.

== Awards ==
Year	Award	Category	Nominated work	Result	Ref.
2025	The Scotsman Fringe First Awards	Fringe First Award for Outstanding New Writing	#CHARLOTTESVILLE	Won	

== See also ==
- Unite the Right rally
- Political theatre
