= Vicky Featherstone =

Theatre and artistic director (born 1957)

- Born: 5 April 1967 (age 59); Redhill, Surrey, England
- Occupations: Theatre and artistic director
- Years active: 1990–present
- Spouse: Danny Brown
- Children: 2

Vicky Featherstone (born 5 April 1967) is a theatre and artistic director. She was artistic director of the UK new writing touring theatre company Paines Plough from 1997, founding director of the National Theatre of Scotland in 2004, and the first female artistic director of London's Royal Court Theatre from 2013 until 2023. Featherstone's career has been characterised by significant involvement with new writing.

== Early life and education ==
Vicky Featherstone was born in Redhill, Surrey on 5 April 1967, but moved to Scotland at 6 weeks old, where she lived in Clackmannanshire until the age of 7, when her father's work took her around the world. Her father is a chemical engineer and her mother a nurse. She is the eldest of three children. Featherstone was privately educated.

Featherstone studied drama at Manchester University, and soon discovered she favoured directing over acting.

Featherstone also did an MA in directing at the university, in association with Manchester's Contact Theatre.

== Career ==
=== Early directorships and acting ===
Featherstone's worked as assistant director at the Royal Court Theatre in London in 1990 on Martin Crimp's No One Sees the Video. She gained a place on the Regional Theatre Young Director Scheme, under which she spent two years from 1992 to 1994, first as assistant director and then associate director, based at West Yorkshire Playhouse, then under the artistic directorship of Jude Kelly.

She then became resident director at the Octagon Theatre Bolton from 1994 to 1996 and worked at Northern Stage, then became Literary Associate for the Bush Theatre from 1996 to 1997.

=== Television script editor ===
In the mid-1990s, Featherstone returned to TV script editing and programme development, having worked for a time as a script editor for Central TV immediately after University. Whilst a script editor at United Productions, Featherstone conceived, after attending a friend's wedding in Yorkshire, with writer Ashley Pharoah, the series Where the Heart Is, revolving around the lives of district nurses in a close-knit Yorkshire community. The programme debuted in 1997.

She was also involved in the development of the pathologist drama Silent Witness, first broadcast in 1996, for which she was credited as script editor for the first two episodes.

=== Management roles ===
==== Paines Plough (1997–2004) ====
Featherstone was artistic director of Paines Plough, a theatre company based in the UK that specialises in new plays and touring, from 1997 to 2004.

Immediately prior to her appointment, the company was not thriving. Featherstone appointed writers Mark Ravenhill as literary manager and Sarah Kane as writer-in-residence, and developed an atmosphere seen as welcoming to writers. Within two years of her appointment, the company had increased audiences by over 100%. World premieres of Anna Weiss, a study of false memory syndrome by Mike Cullen; Crave, written by Kane on love and loss; Sleeping Around, a 1990s update of La Ronde; and The Cosmonaut's Last Message to the Woman He Once Loved in the Former Soviet Union by David Greig, helped build Paines Plough's reputation. Under Featherstone the company was noted for its commitment to theatrical activity outside London in the UK regions, and willingness to experiment and collaborate with other theatre companies such as Frantic Assembly and Graeae. Her hiring of John Tiffany as associate director was also considered a significant contribution to the company's success.

By the time of Featherstone's departure from Paines Plough in 2004, the company was being described as "a major force for new writing" and "a national and international force in British theatre", staff had doubled from four to eight, she had turned round the company's deficit and turnover had risen to £0.5m per year.

==== National Theatre of Scotland (2006–2013) ====
In September 2003, the Scottish Executive announced funding of £7.5m for the establishment of the National Theatre of Scotland, with £3.5m for the year April 2004 to March 2005 and £4m for the following year. Robert Findlay, once chief executive of Scottish Radio Holdings, was appointed as chairman, and once a board had also been appointed, the search for the first artistic director for the NTS began.

The job of director of the NTS, combining the roles of director, chief executive, and artistic director, was advertised in May 2004. From an initial 30 applications for the post, six were interviewed. Findlay announced Featherstone's appointment on 29 July 2004 at the Royal Scottish Academy of Music and Drama, and Featherstone took up her post at the NTS – then housed in an empty temporary office in Hope Street, Glasgow, on 1 November 2004.

She began building a team. This included John Tiffany, who had worked with her at Paines Plough and prior to that was Literary Director of Edinburgh's Traverse Theatre, as associate director of New Work; Neil Murray, since 1999 executive producer of Glasgow's Tron Theatre, as the NTS's Executive Director; playwright David Greig, as dramaturg; playwright and poet Liz Lochhead as an artistic associate; and Simon Sharkey, then artistic director of Cumbernauld Theatre, as associate director of NTS Learn. Featherstone and the team undertook intensive engagement with theatre professionals and groups throughout Scotland and began developing ideas and strategy.

On 2 November 2005, Featherstone unveiled the National Theatre of Scotland's inaugural programme to a packed audience at the Tramway in Glasgow, having announced it the previous day. The season included ten first night shows on the theme of Home, Black Watch scheduled for August 2006, and various other productions.

"We asked 10 of our best directors to create a piece of theatre around the word 'Home' – commonly thought of as one of the most evocative words in the English language....We want people to realise the NTS relates to the people of Scotland and for people to feel that they have ownership of it. We have an opportunity to define what theatre, or a national theatre, can and should be". The 10 experimental site-specific shows were staged simultaneously in non-theatre locations all across Scotland, with an official first night of 25 February 2006. Each production was allocated a budget of £60,000, and up to 10,000 free tickets were available.

Inspired by an article she read in the Glasgow Herald shortly after she took up her appointment with the NTS in November 2004, Featherstone asked writer Gregory Burke to follow the unfolding story of the Black Watch regiment – the oldest Highland regiment, which was being merged with other Scottish regiments. The production, about a group of young soldiers from the Fife-based regiment in Basra, was developed from interviews Burke did one Sunday afternoon in a pub in Dunfermline with six soldiers who had served in Iraq. This was developed into loosely connected scenes and ultimately the finished play. Directed by Tiffany, Black Watch opened as part of the Edinburgh Festival Fringe in August 2006, as a site-specific work performed at the University of Edinburgh's Drill hall. The play was an immediate popular and critical success. The production subsequently won multiple awards including Olivier Awards, has toured repeatedly since with productions on five continents, and has been adapted for television by the BBC.

==== Royal Court Theatre (2013–2023) ====
Featherstone's appointment as the first female artistic director of the Royal Court Theatre was announced in May 2012 and she took over in April 2013. She left the position in 2023.

During this time, she was asked to do a production of Samuel Beckett's Krapp's Last Tape.

=== Recent work ===
From October 2024, Featherstone directed a production of Krapp's Last Tape for Landmark Productions, starring Stephen Rea as Krapp. The play premiered at the Gaiety Theatre in Dublin, Ireland, moving to Dublin's Project Arts Centre later that month. In February–March 2025 the production plays at the Dunstan Playhouse at the Adelaide Festival Centre in Adelaide, South Australia, and then at the Barbican Theatre in London in April–May.

Featherstone directed the Scottish Theatre Company's production of David Harrower's adaptation of Muriel Spark's novel, The Prime of Miss Jean Brodie, which toured Scottish theatres in the autumn of 2026.

== Personal life ==
Featherstone married Danny Brown, a TV scriptwriter and former stand-up comedian. They have two children.

== Theatre productions ==
=== Home at the NTS (2006) ===
Home productions
Title	Location	Creators	Notes
Home Aberdeen	A derelict block of flats in the Middlefield estate, with the audience transported there by bus	Director Alison Peebles, writer Rona Munro, designer Martin McNee	The personal and political struggles of a tenement block. 20 professional and community actors of varying ages performed in the show, set in six unoccupied flats on the same low-rise staircase (each with a nameplate on the door featuring the word "Home").
Home Caithness	A disused glass factory	Director Matthew Lenton	The performance took place with the audience standing ankle-deep in sand which "filled" the glass factory.
Home Dumfries	The Loreburn drill hall	Director Graham Eatough	Based on elderly people's ideas of home, and old people's memories of the past, performed as a soundscape.
Home Dundee	The McManus Galleries (a nineteenth century public museum and gallery)	Director Kenny Miller	1940s and 50s nostalgia and popular culture, with the glitter-ball pink and black of a wartime ballroom and a history film of humorous old Dundonians remembering their wartime youth.
Home East Lothian	A forest, with the audience transported there by bus	Director Gill Robertson	A piece aimed specifically at children, using the story of Hansel and Gretel.
Home Edinburgh	The Queen's Hall, a nineteenth century public building	Director Anthony Neilson	Seven primary-school children from West Lothian, after a fortnight's workshops with Neilson, scripted what they thought First Minister's Questions might be like in the Holyrood Parliament.
Home Glasgow	A multi storey high-rise block of flats at Cranhill in Easterhouse	Director John Tiffany	Combined live theatre of actors filmed inside the 18-storey tower block, with intimate screen drama, transmitted live from inside the flats via handheld surveillance cameras held to the windows by three men abseiling down the building and projected on to a huge screen, with up to 1,000 people watching from the natural amphitheatre of the ground below. The story focused on its central character's return from London to his old high-rise home, where his 17-year-old brother, under surveillance by the state, has a quest for a reunion with his dead father, a victim of Gulf War syndrome.
Home Inverness	Arts in Motion, a converted industrial warehouse in Evanton	Director Scott Graham	Local family photos provided the stimulus for a physical theatre piece.
Home Shetland	Performed on board the car deck of the Northlink Ferry while it paused in its round trip from Aberdeen in Lerwick harbour	Director Wils Wilson, poetic text by Jackie Kay	An installation show, delivered through personal guided-tour handsets, leading the audience through a story of deeply buried female experience, and of the perennial island tension between leaving and staying, as ghostly actors dressed in 1940s or 50s costume drifted through the lounges and saloons of the ship.
Home Stornoway	A disused shop in the town centre	Director Stewart Laing	A doll's house set, with about 20 people at a time given a guided tour of its various, detachable rooms.

=== Other productions ===
Productions directed by Vicky Featherstone
Play	Author	Theatre	Opening date	Notes
The Prime of Miss Jean Brodie	David Harrower's adaptation of the novel by Muriel Spark	Lyceum Theatre, Edinburgh, Citizen's Theatre, Glasgow, His Majesty's Theatre, Aberdeen, Pitlochry Festival Theatre	2 October 2026	National Theatre of Scotland in partnership with the Lyceum Theatre, Edinburgh, and Pitlochry Festival Theatre
Jews. In Their Own Words	Jonathan Freedland, from an idea by Tracy-Ann Oberman	Royal Court Theatre	20 September 2022	
The Glow	Alistair McDowall	Royal Court Theatre	24 January 2022	
Shoe Lady	E. V. Crowe	Royal Court Theatre	4 March 2020	
Our Ladies of Perpetual Succour	adapted by Lee Hall from the novel The Sopranos by Alan Warner	Traverse Theatre, Tron Theatre, The Lemon Tree, Eden Court, Adam Smith Theatre, The Brunton and Live Theatre	18 August 2015	A co-production between the National Theatre of Scotland and Live Theatre
The Mistress Contract	Abi Morgan	Royal Court Theatre	13 January 2014	
The Ritual Slaughter of Gorge Mastromas	Dennis Kelly	Royal Court Theatre	5 September 2013	
Untitled Matriarch Play (or Seven Sisters)	Nikole Beckwith	Royal Court Theatre	9 July 2013	
The President Has Come To See You	Lasha Bugadze, translated by Donald Rayfield	Royal Court Theatre	11 June 2013	
Enquirer		The Hub at Pacific Quay, Glasgow, then later Mother at The Trampery and Belfast Festival	26 April 2012	National Theatre of Scotland in partnership with the London Review of Books. Edited and directed by Featherstone and John Tiffany. Co-edited by Andrew O'Hagan.
Appointment with the Wicker Man	Greg Hemphill and Donald McLeary, based on the film The Wicker Man, the film screenplay by Anthony Shaffer and the novel Ritual by David Pinner	Alhambra Theatre Dunfermline, His Majesty's Theatre Aberdeen, Theatre Royal, Glasgow, Eden Court Inverness and Assembly Rooms, Edinburgh	17 February 2012	A National Theatre of Scotland production
27	Abi Morgan	Royal Lyceum Theatre Edinburgh, Citizens Theatre, Glasgow then Cambridge Arts Theatre in 2012	21 October 2011	A co-production between the National Theatre of Scotland and The Royal Lyceum Theatre, Edinburgh.
The Wheel	Zinnie Harris	Traverse	28 July 2011	A National Theatre of Scotland production. Winner of an Amnesty International Freedom of Expression Award and a Fringe First at the 2011 Edinburgh Fringe Festival.
The Miracle Man	Douglas Maxwell	Tron Theatre Glasgow, Brunton Theatre Musselburgh, Eden Court Inverness and Lemon Tree Aberdeen	18 March 2010	A National Theatre of Scotland production.
Empty	Cathy Forde	Tron Theatre Glasgow, Brunton Theatre Musselburgh, Eden Court Inverness and Lemon Tree Aberdeen	16 March 2010	A National Theatre of Scotland production.
Wall of Death: A Way of Life		SECC, Glasgow, Aberdeen Exhibition and Conference Centre, Royal Highland Centre, Edinburgh	4 February 2010	A National Theatre of Scotland production. Directed by Featherstone and Stephen Skrynka.
Long Gone Lonesome	Duncan McLean	Cromarty Hall, Orkney then tours of Scotland, plus Galway Arts Festival in 2010, and a US tour in 2012	6 October 2009	A National Theatre of Scotland production.
Cockroach	Sam Holcoft	Traverse	23 October 2008	A National Theatre of Scotland production.
365	David Harrower	Eden Court Inverness, then Edinburgh Playhouse, subsequently transferring to the Lyric Hammersmith	13 August 2008	A National Theatre of Scotland co-production with the Edinburgh International Festival.
Mary Stuart	Friedrich Schiller, in a new version by David Harrower from a literal translation by Patricia Benecke	Citizens Theatre, Glasgow, then Royal Lyceum Theatre Edinburgh	3 October 2006	A National Theatre of Scotland, Royal Lyceum Theatre, Edinburgh and Citizens’ Theatre, Glasgow co-production.
The Wolves in the Walls	Neil Gaiman, based on the book by Neil Gaiman and Dave McKean	Tramway Glasgow, Lyric Hammersmith, then UK tours and New Victory Theater, New York	22 March 2006	Directed by Featherstone, with a credit of "conceived and made for the stage by Featherstone, Julian Crouch and Nick Powell". Equity Award for Best Show for Children and Young People at 2006 TMA awards.
Pyrenees	David Greig	Menier Chocolate Factory, then Watford Palace	9 March 2005	
The Small Things	Enda Walsh	Menier Chocolate Factory	28 January 2005	
Wild Lunch 7	various	Young Vic	11 May 2004	Performances of 8 different plays. Featherstone directed 270° by Jennifer Farmer and possibly other plays.
On Blindness	Glyn Cannon	Soho Theatre, then West Yorkshire Playhouse and Birmingham Rep	12 February 2004	Directed by Featherstone, Scott Graham, Steven Hoggett and Jenny Sealey (of Graeae Theatre Company).
A Number	Caryl Churchill	SNT Drama Ljubljana	31 May 2003	Staged reading, a co-production of SNT Drama and Exodos Festival of Contemporary Performing Arts.
The Drowned World	Gary Owen	Birmingham Rep, then Traverse in August 2002, followed by UK tour in 2003.	11 March 2002	Winner of a Fringe First at the 2002 Edinburgh Fringe Festival.
Tiny Dynamite	Abi Morgan	Traverse then UK tour	3 August 2001	
Wild Lunch 5	various	Bridewell Theatre	5 June 2001	Script-in-hand performances of 6 different plays. It is unclear which plays Featherstone directed.
Crazy Gary's Mobile Disco	Gary Owen	Chapter Arts Centre, then UK tour	8 February 2001	
Splendour	Abi Morgan	Traverse, then UK tour	3 August 2000	Featherstone won 2001 Barclays Theatre Awards Best Director, and the 2001 TMA Best Director award, for the production.
Wild Lunch 4: Jubilee – Plays from Underground	various	Bridewell Theatre	10 May 2000	Script-in-hand performances of 9 new plays inspired by the Jubilee Line Extension. It is unclear which plays Featherstone directed.
Wild Lunch 3	various	Bridewell Theatre	30 October 1999	Script-in-hand performances of 7 different plays. It is unclear which plays Featherstone directed.
The Cosmonaut's Last Message to the Woman He Once Loved in the Former Soviet Union	David Greig	Ustinov Studio Bath, then UK tour	15 April 1999	
Ticket To Write	various	Octagon Theatre Bolton, Bristol Old Vic, West Yorkshire Playhouse and Live Theatre, Newcastle	21 October 1998	10 short premiers by 10 writers.
Crave	Sarah Kane	Traverse, then Royal Court, then Berlin and Dublin festivals	11 August 1998	
Riddance	Linda McLean	Traverse then UK tour	August 1998	Winner of a Fringe First at the 1999 Edinburgh Fringe Festival.
Sleeping Around	Stephen Greenhorn, Hilary Fannin, Abi Morgan and Mark Ravenhill	Salisbury Playhouse, then UK tour	9 February 1998	
Crazyhorse	Parv Bancil	New Vic Studio, Bristol, then UK tour	1 October 1997	
Anna Weiss	Mike Cullen	Traverse	August 1997	Winner of a Fringe First at the 1997 Edinburgh Fringe Festival and an Independent on Sunday Award.
Wild Lunch 1	various	Bridewell Theatre	7 February 1997	Script-in-hand performances of 5 different plays. It is unclear which plays Featherstone directed.
Two Lips Indifferent Red	Tamsin Oglesby	Bush Theatre	6 September 1995	
The Glass Menagerie	Tennessee Williams	Octagon Theatre Bolton	September 1994	
A Christmas Carol	Charles Dickens	Octagon Theatre Bolton	December 1993	
Brighton Rock	Graham Greene, adapted by David Hurlock	West Yorkshire Playhouse	1993/94	
9½ Minutes	Kathleen McCreery	Gulbenkian Studio (Northern Stage)	November 1992	Short play as part of the Women Prefer series.
Kvetch	Steven Berkoff	West Yorkshire Playhouse	1991/92	
