= Scottish Review of Books =

- Cover of issue 23 of the Scottish Review of Books
- Editor: Alan Taylor
- Categories: Scottish literature
- Frequency: Quarterly
- Publisher: Scottish Review of Books
- Total circulation: 320,000 (annually)
- First issue: 2004
- Country: Scotland
- Language: English
- Website: scottishreviewofbooks.org
- ISSN: 1745-5014

The Scottish Review of Books was a quarterly literary magazine published in Scotland. It was established in October 2004 with the support of the Scottish Arts Council. In 2009 it became a limited company with a board of directors, Scottish Review of Books Limited. It published articles by many distinguished contributors and commentators. The Review reached a circulation of around 320,000 copies per year. It closed in 2019 after funding was withdrawn.

The magazine was inserted free of charge in The Herald newspaper and was also available by subscription in print or online and in schools, museums, libraries, book festivals and bookshops across Scotland. The tie-in with The Herald was of considerable benefit in improving its reach; Carla Sassi of the University of Verona commented that "the Scottish Review of Books... probably reaches a larger reading public than any specialised literary journal or magazine did in the past."

It was edited by Alan Taylor, associate editor of the Sunday Herald. He said of the magazine, "our aim ... is to get people talking about issues surrounding Scottish literature and to challenge people’s perceptions about particular subjects. At a time when Edinburgh has been recognised by UNESCO as the first World City of Literature and when Scotland’s writers are receiving both critical and popular acclaim, a magazine such as this is a timely and much needed addition to the literature landscape in Scotland." The magazine was established to provide a smaller-scale Scottish equivalent of the London Review of Books, on which it was closely modelled in name and appearance. Unlike the LRB, which covers world literature, the SRB dealt only with Scottish books, leading Andrew Crumey to ask in Scotland on Sunday, "How then do we define Scottishness?"

The impetus for its establishment came from a Review of Scottish Publishing issued by the Scottish Arts Council in 2004. The review, carried out by PricewaterhouseCoopers and Napier University on behalf of the SAC, recommended the creation of a new magazine to promote Scottish books as part of a wider effort to boost Scottish book publishing. The launch of the Scottish Review of Books was underwritten by two publishers, Derek Rodger of Argyll Publishing, and Hugh Andrew of Birlinn and Polygon with the aid of grants from the SAC. Alan Taylor, the Associate and Literary Editor of the Sunday Herald and former Deputy Editor of The Scotsman, was appointed as editor. In 2010 the magazine switched to being published in the Saturday edition of The Herald, rather than on Sundays as previously.

The Glasgow design consultancy Freight carried out a major redesign of the Scottish Review of Books in 2010. Freight Design became insolvent in 2017 and its imprint Freight Books closed, despite having received £200,000 in funding from the Scottish Arts Council's successor, Creative Scotland.

When Creative Scotland withdrew funding from the Scottish Review of Books in 2019, leading to its closure, James Robertson told The Times he was "baffled" by the "highly regrettable" decision, adding, "So what has changed in the 15 years since SRB was established with what was then Scottish Arts Council support? It's almost as if somebody at CS has said, 'This has been going on too long!' SRB's longevity is a major reason why it should not be killed off, especially as in the intervening years the space for serious literary reviewing in other places has drastically diminished. Quite apart from anything else, the SRB actually pays its reviewers and contributors, and pays them a fair fee for their work."
