= The Sopranos (novel) =

1998 novel by Alan Warner

- First edition (publ. Jonathan Cape)
- Author: Alan Warner
- Language: English
- Publisher: Jonathan Cape
- Publication date: 1998

The Sopranos is a 1998 novel by Scottish writer Alan Warner. It won the Saltire Society's 1998 Scottish Book of the Year Award.

The novel was adapted by Lee Hall with the title Our Ladies of Perpetual Succour for a National Theatre of Scotland and Live Theatre, Newcastle, tour in 2015.

The novel has been adapted by Alan Sharp and Michael Caton-Jones for the screen titled Our Ladies and released in 2019 and directed by Michael Caton-Jones.
