= The Arches (Glasgow) =

Club in Scotland

Coordinates: 55°51′30″N 4°15′30″W

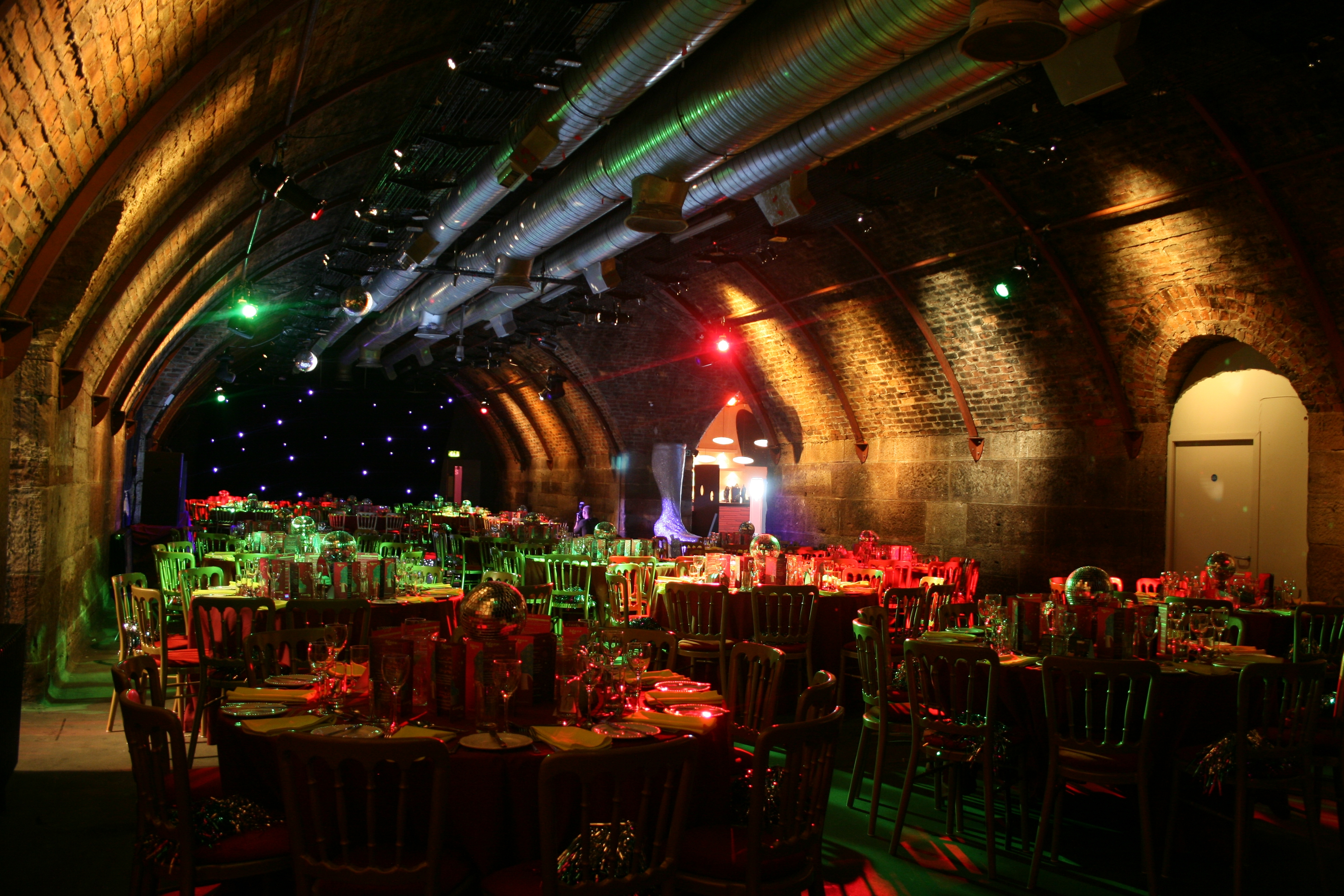
- Interactive map of The Arches
- Location: City Centre, Glasgow, Scotland
- Owner: Arches Retail Company Limited
- Seating type: Seating/Standing
- Type: Bar, Theatre, Music venue, Nightclub
- Event: Multi-genred

Construction
- Opened: 1991
- Closed: 2015

The Arches was a bar, arts venue, theatre, live music venue and nightclub in Glasgow, Scotland, which first opened in 1991. It was a not-for-profit organisation, and was situated in the City Centre under Glasgow Central station and the West Coast Main Line in the brick arches of the viaduct leading into the station, with entrances on Midland Street, and (since 2001) an entrance underneath Hielanman's Umbrella on Argyle Street. The venue had 7,800 square metres (84,000 sq ft) of floor space which was spread over two floors and seven arches. In June 2015, The Arches announced on their website that the company would go into administration and had no choice but to close down the facility, after its licensing hours had been curtailed.

== History ==
The site of the venue was a previously derelict area below the Glasgow Central railway station, which was converted to house the exhibition Glasgow's Glasgow during the city's year as European City of Culture. In 1991, after the exhibition had ended, the space was obtained by Andy Arnold, who would become the venue's artistic director, for the purposes of creating a theatre. Realising that theatre productions required substantial funding, Arnold decided to stage nightclub events to support his projects, and this practice continued until the venue's closure, the clubbing revenues helping to fund what became one of Europe's leading cultural venues.

In early 2007, The Arches was voted 12th best club in the world by DJs in a DJ Magazine poll.

In January 2008, Andy Arnold left The Arches to become the artistic director at the Tron Theatre. He was succeeded as artistic director and joint chief executive by Jackie Wylie, formerly the venue's Arts Programmer.

In April 2015, The Arches announced on Facebook that their nightclub licence had been removed from them. DJs, artists, performers showed anger all over the world. A petition started to reinstate the licence gained over 40,000 signatures, while over 400 figures from the Scottish cultural scene, including Irvine Welsh, Liz Lochhead and members of Franz Ferdinand, Belle and Sebastian and Mogwai, signed a letter asking the Scottish government to ensure that The Arches remained open as an arts venue.

In June 2015, The Arches announced on social media that the company would go into administration and would have no choice but to close down the facility.

The Arches building was reopened as Platform food market since February 2018.

Brickwork: A Biography of The Arches was published by Salamander Street in November 2021 containing accounts from directors, DJs, performers, clubbers, artists, bar tenders, actors, audiences and staff.

== Theatre ==
Arnold set up The Arches Theatre Company to perform interpretations of work by playwrights including Samuel Beckett, Tennessee Williams, David Mamet, Harold Pinter and two unperformed works by the novelist James Kelman, generally receiving favourable ratings from the Scottish Arts Council. He was also inspired by the size and atmospherics of the space to put on unusual productions such as Arthur Miller's The Crucible in the building's damp, dark basement with the audience seated on church pews, Metropolis – The Theatre Cut, a promenade version of Fritz Lang's film featuring a cast of 100, and a staging of Seamus Heaney's translation of the epic poem Beowulf. For the building's fifteenth anniversary in 2006, Arnold conceived and directed the critically acclaimed production Spend A Penny, a series of one-on-one monologues staged in the venue's toilet cubicles, featuring work by playwrights including Liz Lochhead.

When Jackie Wylie took over the arts programme in 2008, The Arches built on its increasing reputation for nurturing emergent talent from across the country. The Guardian's theatre critic Lyn Gardner described the venue's significance under Wylie's direction:

The Arches was one of the reasons that in recent years Glasgow has become a magnet for young performance-makers; many of those who forge careers there take the work on to festivals and theatres across the world. It is as significant as Battersea Arts Centre, in London, in the way it nurtures tomorrow.

Between 2008 and 2015, The Arches developed a whole new generation of playwright-performers, including Rob Drummond, Kieran Hurley, Gary McNair and Julia Taudevin, and performance artists like Nic Green, Robert Softley Gale and Adrian Howells. Wylie commissioned and developed international touring multi-award-winning productions including Nic Green's Trilogy, Rob Drummond's Bullet Catch and Kieran Hurley's Beats. Drummond credits The Arches with allowing him to develop his work into a career in theatre. Having rebranded and redeveloped the nine-year-old Arches Theatre Festival into Behaviour, an internationally significant festival of contemporary performance which brought companies and artists like Mammalian Diving Reflex, Ontroerend Goed, Gob Squad, The TEAM, Ann Liv Young, Taylor Mac and Tim Crouch to Scotland, Wylie also co-commissioned performances such as DEREVO's Natura Morte, and Linder Sterling's 13 hour performance Darktown Cakewalk.

== Nightclub events ==
The Arches played host to club nights since 1992 with some nights being promoted by outside companies and others being in-house productions. Notable long-running regular clubs to be held in the venue included:

=== Slam at the Arches ===
One of the first club nights to be hosted in The Arches, Slam ran every Friday between 1992 and 1998. Originally the night was held in now defunct Glasgow venue Tin Pan Alley and later The Sub Club. It was hosted by local techno producers Slam but also featured regular guests, most notably Underworld and Daft Punk (in their first UK appearance in 1997).

=== Pressure ===
In 1998, after six years of running Friday club nights at The Arches, Slam created a bigger, monthly event, Pressure, on the last Friday of every month. The night had at least two rooms of music playing mainly house and techno. Pressure saw some of the largest names in dance music play The Arches, including Jeff Mills, Carl Craig, Derrick Carter, Richie Hawtin, Laurent Garnier, Felix da Housecat, Ricardo Villalobos, Boys Noize, Vitalic, and Erol Alkan.

=== Other club nights ===
Other well-established club nights at the Arches included:

- Colours (1995)
- Inside Out (1996)
- Death Disco (2002)
- Octopussy (2005)

== Alien Wars ==
In 2008, The Arches reprised its Alien War attraction, which originally took place in 1992, and transformed it into Alien Wars. The initial show was an Alien-inspired tour, recreating the atmosphere and horror of the Alien films. Many celebrities were linked to this attraction, when staged in London, including: Sigourney Weaver, who participated; Sylvester Stallone, whose restaurant was next door, and declined to take part; and, Michael Jackson, whose bodyguards visited but apparently didn't finish the tour. Sigourney Weaver, when asked to comment on her experience, said "Although I have been through the movies, I was screaming as much as everyone else."

The organisers, who had a contract for the first attraction with 20th Century Fox, the copyright holders to the Alien franchise, decided to go beyond this limitation and develop their own storyline, thus freeing themselves of the contractual constraints imposed by Fox. The 2008 storyline is centred on an alien vessel being discovered in the basement by workmen, guarded by the military for the last couple of years, and to which visitors are escorted by "space marines".

== See also ==
- List of electronic dance music venues
