= David Harrower =

Scottish playwright

- Born: 1966 (age 59–60); Edinburgh, Scotland
- Occupation: Playwright
- Writing career
- Language: English
- Years active: 1995–present
- Notable works: Knives in Hens (1995); Blackbird (2005)

David Harrower (born 1966) is a Scottish playwright who (as of 2005) lives in Glasgow. Harrower has published over 10 original works, as well as numerous translations and adaptations.

== Career ==
Harrower's first play, Knives in Hens, which premiered at Edinburgh's Traverse Theatre in 1995, was considered a critical and popular success. It deals with a relationship triangle in a rural setting, and a woman's internal quest to find out what she wants from life.

Subsequent plays include Kill the Old Torture Their Young (Traverse, 1998), which follows a disparate group of characters across an unnamed city, mixing realism with poetry and fantasy. Presence (Royal Court Theatre Upstairs, April 2001) takes another look at the Beatles' residency at the Indra club in Hamburg on the eve of their success, and Dark Earth (Traverse, August 2003) begins as a broad comedy and turns into a speculation about the meaning of history and the land.

Harrower has also written adaptations including: The Chrysalids (1999), adapted from John Wyndham's novel, for the National Theatre's Connections project; Six Characters Looking for an Author, a version of Pirandello's Six Characters in Search of an Author, first staged at the Young Vic in 2000; Chekhov's Ivanov (2002), performed at the National Theatre; and Buchner's Woyzeck, performed at the Edinburgh Lyceum in 2002. The National Theatre of Scotland's production of Harrower's adaptation of Muriel Spark's novel, The Prime of Miss Jean Brodie, directed by Vicky Featherstone, with Gayle Rankin in the title role, toured Scottish theatres in the autumn of 2026.

He has also translated The Girl on the Sofa (2002), by Jon Fosse, presented in a joint production by the Edinburgh International Festival and the Schaubuhne, Berlin, and Schiller's Mary Stuart for the National Theatre of Scotland/Royal Lyceum, Edinburgh/Citizens' Theatre, Glasgow.

In 2005, his play Blackbird was produced by the Edinburgh International Festival, directed by Peter Stein and transferred in February 2006 to the Albery Theatre in London's West End It depicts the meeting between a young woman and a middle-aged man who, fifteen years earlier when she was twelve years old, kidnapped and raped her. In April 2008 the play was revived by David Grindley at the Rose Theatre, Kingston prior to a national tour . In 2011, this play was produced by Rogue Machine in Los Angeles. This production won the LA Drama Critics Circle Award for Best Writing and Lead Performance by Sam Anderson.

His play 365 was presented by the National Theatre of Scotland at the Edinburgh International Festival in 2008, directed by Vicky Featherstone. The play recounts the stories of 14 young people who have been in care are now living on their own in 'practice flats'. It was subsequently performed in London at the Lyric Theatre, Hammersmith.

In 2011, he wrote a new version of Gogol's classic text, The Government Inspector, produced at London's Young Vic Theatre, directed by Richard Jones and starring The Mighty Boosh's Julian Barratt and Smack the Pony's Doon Mackichan and Kyle Soller.

== Plays ==
=== Original plays ===
- Knives in Hens
- Kill the Old Torture Their Young
- Presence
- Dark Earth
- Blackbird
- 365
- Lucky Box
- A Slow Air
- Ciara
- 54% Acrylic

=== Adaptations and translations ===
- Six Characters in Search of an Author
- The Chrysalids
- Tales from the Vienna Woods
- Ivanov
- Woyzeck
- The Girl on the Sofa
- Mary Stuart
- The Good Soul of Szechuan for Young Vic
- Sweet Nothings (after Arthur Schnitzler's Liebelei) for the Young Vic
- The Government Inspector for Young Vic
- Calum's Road for the National Theatre of Scotland
- The Prime of Miss Jean Brodie for the National Theatre of Scotland

== Bibliography ==
- Knives in Hens Methuen, 1997
- Kill the Old Torture their Young Methuen, 1998
- Presence Faber and Faber, 2001
- Six Characters Looking for an Author (Luigi Pirandello) in a new version for the Young Vic Methuen, 2001
- The Chrysalids (adaptation) Faber and Faber, 2001
- Ivanov (Anton Chekhov) in a new version for the Royal National Theatre Oberon, 2002
- Purple (Jon Fosse) Faber and Faber/NT Connections, 2002
- The Girl on the Sofa (Jon Fosse) Oberon, 2002
- Dark Earth Faber and Faber, 2003
- Tales from the Vienna Woods (Ödön von Horváth) in a new version for the RNT Faber and Faber, 2003

== Sources ==
- Theatre Record and its annual Indexes
- Aleks Sierz: In-Yer-Face Theatre. British Drama Today. 2001 ISBN 0-571-20049-4
