= James Brining =

English theatre director (born 1968)

- Born: 1968 (age 57–58); Leeds, England
- Education: Cambridge University
- Occupation: Theatre director
- Spouse: Beverley Brining

James Edward Brining (born June 1968) is an English theatre director and Chief Executive Officer (CEO). He founded Rendezvous Theatre Company and was artistic director of Proteus Theatre Company, TAG Theatre Company, Leeds Playhouse and Dundee Rep Theatre.

In addition, he was community director at the Orange Tree Theatre and latterly CEO of Dundee Rep Theatre and Leeds Playhouse. Brining has held board positions at the Federation of Scottish Theatre and Playwrights' Studio Scotland.

He is currently the artistic director and CEO of the Royal Lyceum Theatre, Edinburgh.

== Personal life ==
Brining was born in Leeds in 1968 and grew up in the Chapel Allerton area of the city. His grandparents grew up in Richmond Hill and his mother taught at Harehills Primary School, whilst his father worked as an electrical engineer for the General Post Office. He attended Carr Manor Primary, St Matthew's Middle School and Leeds Grammar School, before studying English at Cambridge University. He is a Leeds United supporter.

He is married to Beverley, an Orcadian woman.

== Career ==
After graduating from Cambridge in 1989, he moved to Newcastle, and founded the Rendezvous Theatre Company, with the help of the Enterprise Allowance Scheme. The scheme was founded by Margaret Thatcher and widely used by artists. In 1990, he was appointed artistic director of Proteus Theatre Company, a new-writing theatre company based in Basingstoke.

After five years in Basingstoke, Brining joined the Orange Tree Theatre in Richmond as a trainee and Community Director. As Community Director, he worked with schools and young people. In 1997, he joined TAG Theatre Company and within four weeks successfully developed a four-year plan for Scottish Arts Council funding.

At TAG, he was director of a youth-based touring company based in Glasgow. During his time there, he led a project called Making the Nation, that focussed on themes of democracy, governance, politics, nationhood and citizenship. Launched by Scottish Devolution Minister Henry McLeish, the project involved approximately sixteen thousand young people aged between seven and twenty-one. As part of this, he commissioned the plays King Matt by Stephen Greenhorn and Dr Korczak's Example by David Greig, which were initially performed in schools and at venues such as the Macrobert Arts Centre in 2001. Dr Korczak's Example embarked on a three-month tour across Scotland, with Brining later going on to direct it in 2003 at the London International Festival of Theatre, in Japan during his time at Dundee Rep and at Leeds Playhouse.

In 2003, he joined Dundee Rep Theatre as joint artistic director with Dominic Hill. Upon Hill's departure in 2008, he became the sole artistic director and CEO, with responsibility for Scottish Dance Theatre, and the Dundee ensemble. During his time at Dundee, he commissioned and directed the world premiere production of Sunshine on Leith. His final production as director was Zinnie Harris's play Further Than the Furthest Thing.

In 2012, he returned to Leeds as CEO and artistic director of West Yorkshire Playhouse. During his time at the Playhouse, he oversaw its rebranding as Leeds Playhouse and a £16.8 million refurbishment, which included the creation of a studio theatre. In January 2014, he oversaw the theatre becoming the world's first Theatre of Sanctuary. The theatre actively worked with refugees and asylum seekers, as well as having a Haydays scheme for older people. In 2018, prior to the venue's refurbishment, Brining oversaw performances of Alan Bennett's Talking Heads monologues in homes across the city, as well as on the theatre's main stage. He described this as a thank you to the city of Leeds. Under his stewardship he commissioned sixty-five new plays and the theatre was named the UK's Most Welcoming Theatre.

In April 2025, he returned to Scotland, becoming Artistic director of the Royal Lyceum Theatre, Edinburgh replacing David Greig. He described the move as coming home, noting his family connection to Scotland. His first play as director was an adaptation of Chekhov's The Seagull. As part of the theatre company's 60th anniversary, he commissioned four Edinburgh-based writers to create monologues for Lyceum at Home. The scheme saw them performed in homes across the city's seventeen wards, which he said would widen the Lyceum's reach across the Scottish capital. Before the musical One Day premiered at the venue, national critics sent a letter to Brining condemning the decision to block reviews from National publications at the Lyceum. They argued that the world premiere was being treated as previews, with priority given to a future London run.

He has also directed radio drama for the BBC. Brining was on the board and latterly chair of the Federation of Scottish Theatre between 2000 and 2012. He was also a founding trustee of Playwrights' Studio Scotland and the Fairfields Art Centre Trust. He was also part of working parties that led to the creation of the National Theatre of Scotland.

== Directorial works ==
Theatre productions directed by James Brining
Year	Production	Type	Writer	Theatre or company	References
1998	Othello	Play	William Shakespeare	TAG Theatre Company	
1999	Dr Faustus	Play	Christopher Marlowe, adapted by Edwin Morgan	TAG Theatre Company	
2000	Antigone	Play	Sophocles, adapted by Sarah Wood	TAG Theatre Company	
2001	Dr Korczak's Example	Play	David Greig	TAG Theatre Company	
2003	Flora the Red Menace	Musical	George Abbott and Robert Russell	Dundee Rep Theatre	
2004	A Lie of the Mind	Play	Sam Shepard	Dundee Rep Theatre	
2004	Dumbstruck	Play	David Kane	Dundee Rep Theatre	
2005	Gypsy	Musical	Arthur Laurents	Dundee Rep Theatre	
2006	Dr Korczak's Example	Play	David Greig	Dundee Rep Theatre	
2007	Sunshine on Leith	Musical	Stephen Greenhorn	Dundee Rep Theatre	
2008	Romeo and Juliet	Play	William Shakespeare	Dundee Rep Theatre	
2009	Who's Afraid of Virginia Woolf?	Play	Edward Albee	Dundee Rep Theatre	
2009	Balgay Hill	Play	Simon Macallum	Dundee Rep Theatre	
2009	A Christmas Carol	Play	Charles Dickens, adapted by Neil Duffield	Dundee Rep Theatre	
2010	Sweeney Todd: The Demon Barber of Fleet Street	Musical	Hugh Wheeler	Dundee Rep Theatre	
2012	Further Than the Furthest Thing	Play	Zinnie Harris	Dundee Rep Theatre	
2013	Sweeney Todd: The Demon Barber of Fleet Street	Musical	Hugh Wheeler	West Yorkshire Playhouse	
2014	The Crucible	Play	Arthur Miller	West Yorkshire Playhouse	
2014	Enjoy	Play	Alan Bennett	West Yorkshire Playhouse	
2014	Talking Heads A Chip in the Sugar	Plays	Alan Bennett	West Yorkshire Playhouse	
2014	Talking Heads A Lady of Letters	Plays	Alan Bennett	West Yorkshire Playhouse	
2014	Talking Heads Bed Amongst the Lentils	Plays	Alan Bennett	West Yorkshire Playhouse	
2015	The Rise and Fall of Little Voice	Play	Jim Cartwright	West Yorkshire Playhouse and Birmingham Repertory Theatre	
2015	Sweeney Todd: The Demon Barber of Fleet Street	Musical	Hugh Wheeler	Welsh National Opera	
2015	Chitty Chitty Bang Bang	Musical	Jeremy Sams	West Yorkshire Playhouse and UK Tour	
2016	Into the Woods	Musical	James Lapine	West Yorkshire Playhouse and Opera North	
2017	(the fall of) The Master Builder	Play	Henrik Ibsen, adapted by Zinnie Harris	West Yorkshire Playhouse	
2018	Sunshine on Leith	Musical	Stephen Greenhorn	West Yorkshire Playhouse	
2019	The Magic Flute	Opera	Wolfgang Amadeus Mozart	Leeds Playhouse and Opera North	
2019	The Wizard of Oz	Musical	John Kane	Leeds Playhouse	
2019	Ode to Leeds	Play	Zodwa Nyoni	Leeds Playhouse	
2020	Dr Korczak's Example	Play (revival)	David Greig	Leeds Playhouse	
2021	A Little Night Music	Musical	Hugh Wheeler	Leeds Playhouse and Opera North	
2021	Decades: Stories from the City - The Bodyguard	Play	Simon Armitage	Leeds Playhouse	
2022	Charlie and the Chocolate Factory	Musical	David Greig	Leeds Playhouse and UK Tour	
2023	Oliver!	Musical	Lionel Bart	Leeds Playhouse	
2024	My Fair Lady	Musical	Alan Jay Lerner	Leeds Playhouse and Opera North	
2025	The Magic Flute	Opera	Wolfgang Amadeus Mozart	Leeds Playhouse and Opera North	
2025	The Seagull	Play	Anton Chekhov, adapted by Mike Poulton	Royal Lyceum Theatre	
2026	Black Diamonds and the Blue Brazil	Play	Gary McNair	Royal Lyceum Theatre	
2026	A Christmas Carol	Play	Charles Dickens, adapted by Deborah McAndrew	Royal Lyceum Theatre	
