= Citizens Theatre =

Theatre in Glasgow, Scotland

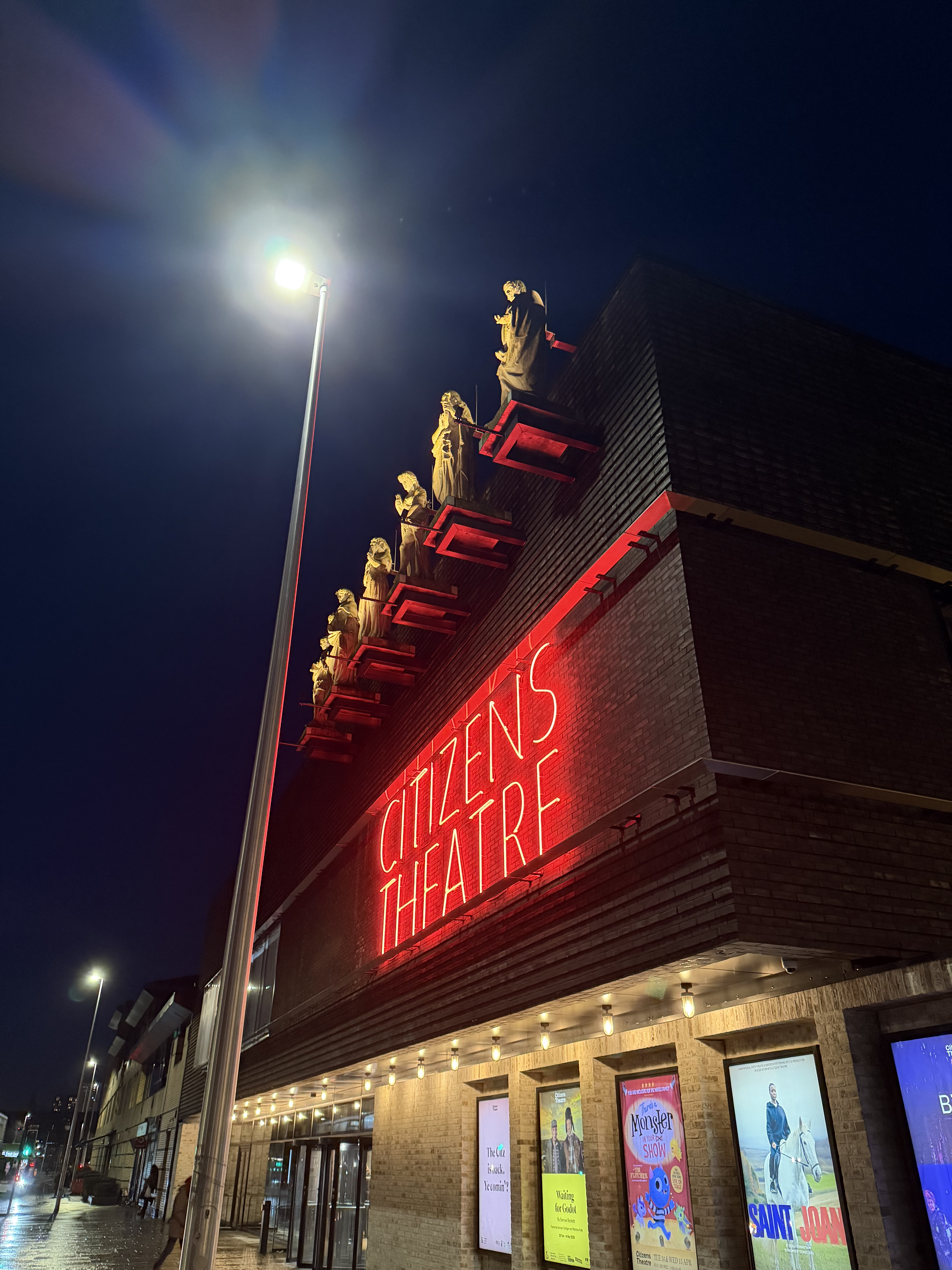
- Exterior 2026 of the Citizens Theatre from Gorbals Street, Glasgow
- Interactive map of Citizens Theatre
- Address: 119 Gorbals Street; Glasgow; Scotland
- Coordinates: 55.851°N 4.253°W
- Owner: Glasgow City Council
- Capacity: 650 (Main auditorium); 152 (studio)
- Designation: Category B Listed building

Construction
- Opened: 11 September 1878
- Architect: James Sellars (1878) Bennetts Associates (2025)

Website
- www.citz.co.uk

The Citizens Theatre, known locally as the Citz, is a major producing theatre in the Gorbals area of Glasgow.

Built in 1878 as Her Majesty's Theatre and designed by James Sellars, then later renamed the Royal Princess's Theatre, the venue gained its current name in 1945 when the Citizens Theatre Company relocated there.

The Category B listed building consists of its original 650-seat sandstone Victorian auditorium at its core, surrounded by a modern three-storey building that includes a studio theatre, and multiple rehearsal and community spaces. The auditorium retains its original understage machinery and paint frame, the oldest in a working theatre in the United Kingdom. The building re-opened after a seven-year refurbishment in August 2025.

The theatre is the main producing theatre for the West of Scotland, employing 120 staff.

== Producing theatre ==
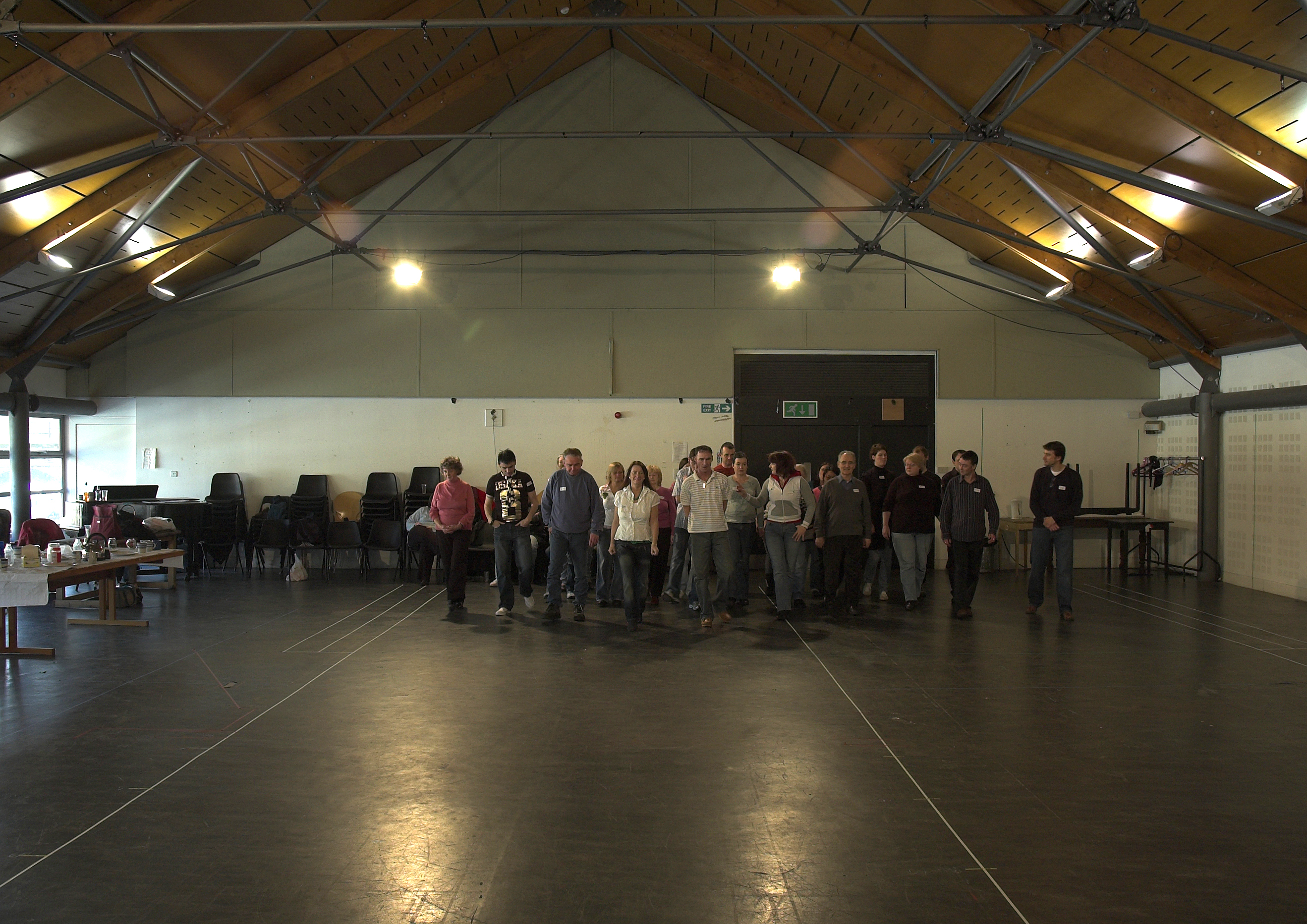
The Citizens Theatre main rehearsal room prior to refurbishment

The Citizens Theatre is the west of Scotland's major producing theatre. Approximately 30 members of staff work backstage during the run up to a production, in addition to which up to 12 actors for a main auditorium production and a director may be rehearsing in one of the theatre's three rehearsal rooms. The production team includes stage management, lighting, sound, workshop, wardrobe and technicians. Costumes, sets, lighting and sound are prepared by the Citizens' backstage crew and the company produces several shows each year in the main auditorium, studio spaces and for touring.

The Citizens Theatre is the only theatre in Scotland still to have the original Victorian machinery under the stage and the original Victorian paint frame is still used today to paint the backcloths for shows. Welding, carpentry, sewing, painting and papier-mâché may be used to create sets for productions.

Recently, Christmas shows have been fairy tales adapted by Alan McHugh and presented in highly theatrical productions offered as an alternative to pantomime.

=== Community work ===
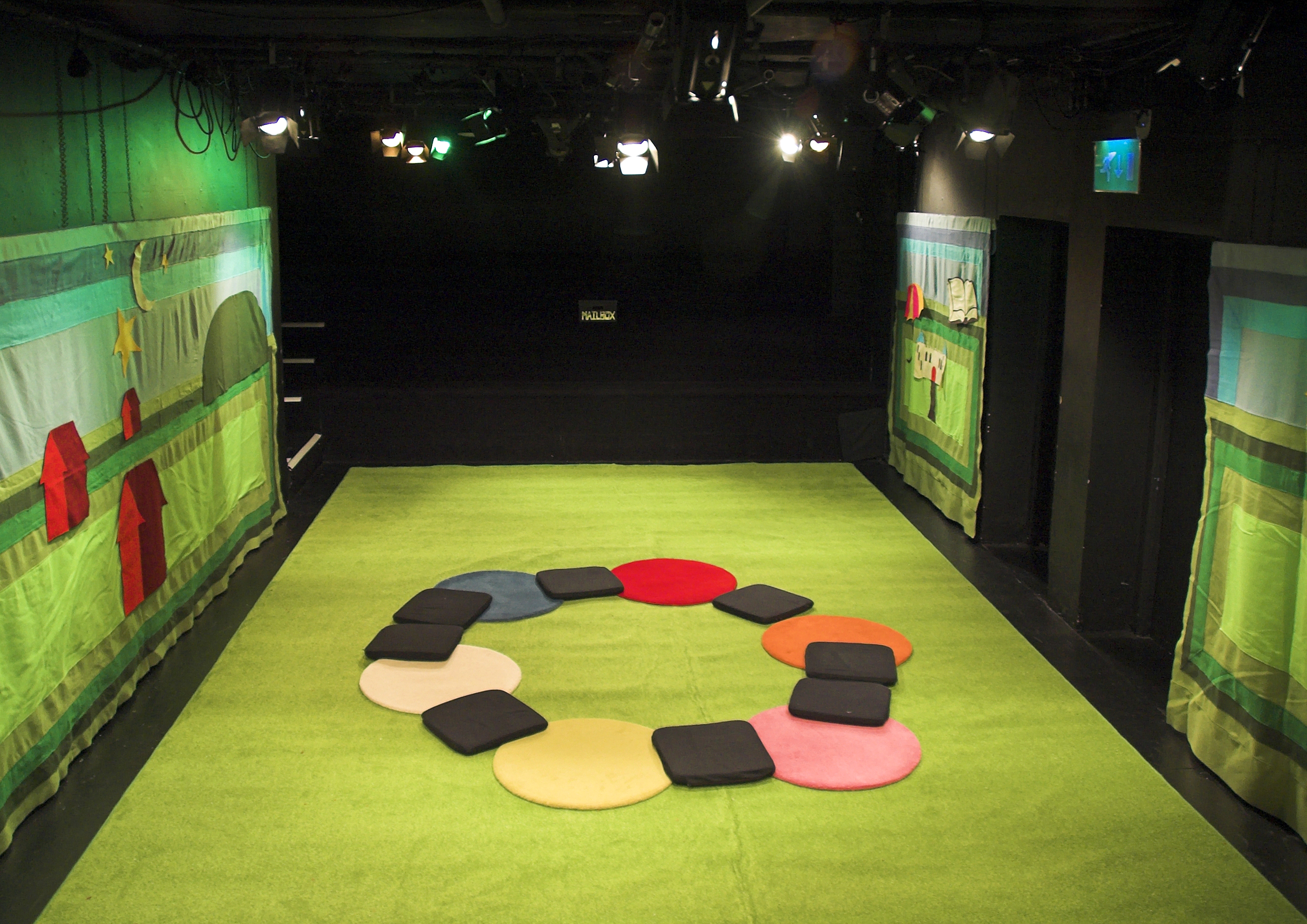
Drama classes venue for ages 4–8

The Citizens YOUNG Co. launched in 2005. The company is drawn from young people in Glasgow and across the West of Scotland. No prior experience is required. Participants work on professional productions performed as part of the Citizens Theatre Season. YOUNG Co. members may study writing, performing, design or stage management and have the opportunity to work with theatre professionals.

The Citizens Theatre runs a programme of workshops and drama classes for children and young people.

== History ==
"The Citizens Theatre is probably more important as part of Britain's heritage than perhaps many imagined. It is Britain's oldest fully functioning professional theatre which retains the greater part of the historic auditorium and stage... This leaves the Grand Theatre, Leeds which opened six weeks before the Citizens (née Her Majesty's) but which had all its stage machinery destroyed 30 years ago. The Citizens is thus a British national treasure."

- Iain MacIntosh, Theatre Specialist, November 2007.

=== Early history ===
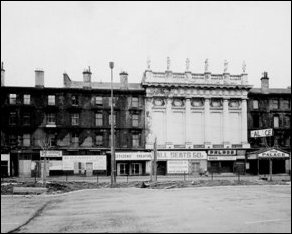
The original facade of the Citizens Theatre (formerly the Royal Princess's Theatre)

The theatre was built in 1878 (as Her Majesty's Theatre and Royal Opera House) and designed by leading architect James Sellars. It was one of 18 theatres built in Glasgow between 1862 and the outbreak of World War I in 1914 (during the same period seven were built in Edinburgh). It was the first theatre opened on the south side of Glasgow. Eventually, there were four theatres built in the south side: The Palace, next door to the new theatre (now demolished), The Princess's Royal (formerly Her Majesty's, and now the Citizens), the Coliseum in Laurieston (now demolished), and the Lyceum in Govan. The remaining theatres built in this period still operating in Glasgow are the Pavilion Theatre, the King's Theatre, the Theatre Royal and the Citizens Theatre.

The theatre was built and owned by John Morrison, as part of his development of tenements close to Gorbals Cross, when the city was becoming the Second City of Empire. As Her Majesty's Theatre and Royal Opera House, he leased it to James F McFadyen, who had studied at Glasgow University and then became a lessee of theatres in England. The theatre seated 2,500, and presented plays, revues and pantomimes. Reflecting the quality of Morrison's work the new building was very safety conscious, substantially built; with fire hydrants on each level and on stage. The stairways were extremely wide and the lobbies spacious. Morrison commissioned sculptor John Mossman to create the six statues which adorned the roof line, above the classical columns of the facade. In December 1879, the lease changed to H Cecil Beryl who changed the name to the long running title of Royal Princess's Theatre. For over twenty years the pantomimes staged by Beryl were written by Fred Locke. After seven years Beryl assumed a business partner Rich Waldon (a writer and producer of pantomimes) who would soon take over and buy the theatre from the builder.

By 1914, Rich Waldon was the busiest theatre operator with five theatres in the city – the Royal Princess's, the Palace, the Lyceum in Govan, the Pavilion and the West End Playhouse/Empress On his death in 1922 he bequeathed the Royal Princess's to his deputy Harry McKelvie, who as a boy had started as a bill poster for him and now was the mastermind behind each year's longest running pantomime in the United Kingdom. 1923 saw a major modernisation of the auditorium which was now fully carpeted and the walls finished in wood panelling. When Harry McKelvie let it be known he was retiring in 1944 he offered a generous ten-year lease to the new Citizens Company, who took it up and moved from the Athenaeum Theatre in Buchanan Street. The Citizens Theatre Company was formed in 1943 by a group of theatre-minded men led by Dr Tom Honeyman and James Bridie, one of Britain's leading playwrights. The name of the new company was taken from the manifesto of 1909 of Alfred Wareing's newly formed Scottish Playgoers Co Ltd for their repertory company, which was to provide live theatre for the citizens of Glasgow, staging new Scottish and international drama, opening at the Royalty Theatre. The 1909 manifesto of the Glasgow Repertory Theatre expressed these tenets: "The Repertory Theatre is Glasgow's own theatre. It is a citizens' theatre in the fullest sense of the term. Established to make Glasgow independent from London for its dramatic supplies, it produces plays which the Glasgow playgoers would otherwise not have the opportunity of seeing." Originally based at the Athenaeum Theatre Bridie's Citizens Company relocated to the Royal Princess's Theatre in the Gorbals in 1945 at the invitation of Harry McKelvie, "The Pantomime King". Bridie renamed it the Citizens Theatre and the Citizens Company opened there on 11 September 1945. In 1946 Harry McKelvie died, his funeral being held in the theatre. At the end of the lease in 1955 Glasgow Corporation bought the theatre and leased it to the Citizens company. Bridie, was a popular playwright and theatre persona, who helped the Citizens to become popular and a wide selection of productions were staged in its first 25 years.

=== Innovation and growth ===
From inception, the Citizens Theatre company was a full-time professional company. The first managing director was novelist Guy McCrone, assisted by his wife; soon after that the post was held by George Singleton. One of the first business managers was Winifred Savile, formerly producer and manageress of Perth Theatre. By coincidence, her uncle, H. Cecil Beryl was lessee of the Royal Princess's Theatre from 1879 to 1887. The board of directors included R.W.Greig, chairman of the Scottish National Orchestra, Norman Duthie, chartered accountant, and Sir John Boyd, lawyer. Playwrights in the Citizens in its first year were: JB Priestley, Robert McLellan, Paul Vincent Carroll, James Bridie, Patrick Griffin, John Wilson, J.M. Barrie, Peter Ustinov, Robert Kemp, Bernard Shaw, Somerset Maugham, Anna LLouise Romoff, Gordon Daviot, Robins Millar, Gordon Bottomley and Moray McLaren. Seven of the productions were premieres. In its first 21 years the Citizens presented nearly 300 plays, of which 72 were British or world premieres.

Production and art directors from 1943 to 1964 included Sir Tyrone Guthrie, Alastair Sim, Fulton Mackay, Iain Cuthbertson and Albert Finney. Michael Blakemore was especially associated with the company, first working there as an actor in 1966–67, where his parts included George in Who's Afraid of Virginia Woolf? and Maitland in Inadmissible Evidence. In the 1960s Glasgow Corporation decided to plan the construction of a new theatre and concert hall in the city centre. This eventually emerged in the late 1980s as the Glasgow International Concert Hall, at the top of Buchanan Street, but without the envisaged theatre. The Citizens remained in its Gorbals site.

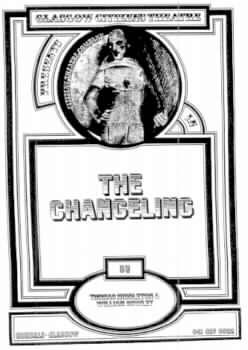
The "Shakespeare in Drag" Poster which caused much controversy in 1975

During the period from the 1970s to the 1990s, the Citizens was associated with innovative play selections and stagings by Giles Havergal, Philip Prowse and Robert David MacDonald. The three were responsible for the Citizens Theatre being again recognised as one of the leading theatres in Britain. Havergal's production of Travels with My Aunt adapted from the Graham Greene novel of the same title, was first presented in Glasgow in 1989 and then played in the West End where it won a Laurence Olivier Award in 1993, and off Broadway in 1995. His production of his and Robert David Macdonald's adaptation of Death in Venice by Thomas Mann was first presented in Glasgow in 2000. Since 1970, Prose was a co-director of the Citizens Company with Havergal and Robert David MacDonald. In 2003 both Havergal and MacDonald stepped down from their posts as directors of the company. Prowse however, continued his role as artistic collaborator with newly appointed artistic director, Jeremy Raison, until 2004. He directed and designed over 70 plays with the Citizens Theatre and has worked throughout the world designing and directing for opera, ballet and drama. Macdonald became a co-director of the Citizens Company with Havergal and Prowse in 1971. Macdonalad wrote and adapted fourteen plays for the company: Dracula (1972); Camille (1974); De Sade Show (1975); Chinchilla (1977); No Orchids for Miss Blandish (1978); Summit Conference (1978); A Waste of Time (1980); Don Juan (1980); Webster (1983); Anna Karenina (1987); Conundrum (1992); In Quest of Conscience (1994); Persons Unknown (1995); The Ice House (1998), Britannicus (2002), Cheri (2003) and Snow White (2003). Macdonald played leading roles in more than twenty productions and directed fifty productions including ten British or world premieres with the company. Macdonald died in 2004.

During the 1970s the Citizens started to attract controversy with its productions and advertising. In December 1970 city councillors called for an end to the £12,000 annual grant the Glasgow Corporation gave to the theatre after it was announced that anyone presenting a trade union card on 8 December would be granted free entry to the theatre. The Evening Times reported "The free tickets were suggested as a gesture of the actors' solidarity with the trade unionists' strike protest against the Industrial Relations Bill" (Evening Times, 7 December 1970). This was the first of many altercations between the theatre and the city council throughout the decade.

Earlier in the autumn season of 1970 a controversial new staging of Hamlet caused outrage in the press for the nudity and alternative acting styles of the company. In 1975 a flier advertising the spring season was condemned by Labour councillor Laurence McGarry for its depiction of "Shakespeare, in drag with large cleavage, painted lips, corsets, suspenders and hand on hip". The councilor felt the theatre was guilty of "playing to an intellectual minority rather than the great mass of the public". In 1977 the Lord Provost Mr Peter McCann called for the sacking of theatre bosses after a performance of Dracula which featured nude scenes he described as "kinky claptrap appealing only to mentally ill weirdos" (Sunday Express, 13 March 1977). The Provost's calls were not supported by his councillors and his attempts to gain city council control of programming at the Citizens failed. The entire run of Dracula at the Citizens was a sell-out.

=== 1980s and 1990s ===
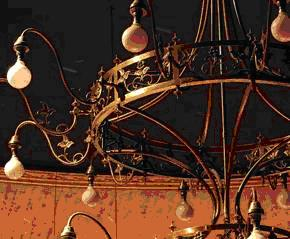
The Victorian-era chandelier which hangs above the main auditorium

After the fire and demolition of the Palace Bingo Hall (née Theatre) in Glasgow in 1977, the citizens theatre rescued the best of the Victorian fittings, including the six statues which stood atop the columns. Following these works, almost the entire tenement block which had sat in front of the auditorium was razed, leaving the Citizens' foyer as the only remaining piece

This state of affairs lasted until 1988, when the remaining foyer and bars were torn down as part of a new development on Gorbals Street by Strathclyde Regional Council, which included a new foyer and bars for the theatre. During the reconstruction, a limited 250 seat theatre operated on the stage behind the safety curtain, accessed via a temporary foyer located at an emergency exit. The main theatre was reopened for the Christmas show, in slightly makeshift fashion due to uncompleted works, as it had been identified as essential to the company's finances.

The new foyer, fronted in glass and yellow brick, opened in 1989. Further works throughout the 1990s included the creation of two studio theatres in 1991–92; office space on the north side in 1996–1998 which also included a new rehearsal room, scene dock, front-of house offices and lift access with National Lottery funding.

=== 21st century ===
The Citizens Theatre and TAG Theatre Company came together as one company in April 2007. The Citizens Theatre announced on 18 February 2013 that architects Bennetts Associates had been selected to work on the plans for the most comprehensive redevelopment of the building since it opened as a theatre in 1878. The theatre closed in 2018 to allow for the demolition and modernisation plans. This included the demolition of the 1989 foyer.

As part of the 2019-onward works, delayed somewhat by the COVID-19 pandemic, the south and west of the building, including the 1989 foyer, were demolished completely with the intention to rebuild both front and back-of-house facilities. During these works, the theatre closed completely, with shows from the Company taking place at Tramway and projects at Scotland Street School Museum.

In August 2025, the theatre reopened following completion of 7 years of works. The works had originally been planned for only three years at a cost of £20 million, however delays meant the final cost was much higher. The first production in the restored theatre was 'Small Acts of Love' on the Pan Am Flight 103 bombing.

The redevelopment, designed by Bennetts Associates and carried out by main contractor Kier Group, cost £29.8 million and was funded by the Scottish Government, Glasgow City Council, the National Lottery Heritage Fund, Creative Scotland and Historic Environment Scotland. Works included demolition of the 1989 foyer and its replacement with a new three-storey extension, a new fly tower, a 150-seat Studio Theatre, improved backstage facilities and universal access throughout. The original Victorian auditorium, understage machinery and paint frame were preserved. The rooftop statues by John Mossman, which had been removed in 1977, were restored and repositioned on the new façade.

== Foyer statues ==
Inside the Citizens foyer from 1977 were four elephant statues and four Nautch girls' statues, all in the baroque Anglo-Indian style, a reminder of the re-design of the adjacent Palace Theatre in 1907 by Bertie Crewe. The remaining two elephants and two more Nautch girls (or goddesses) can now be found in the Theatre Museum in London.

The foyer also features statues representing William Shakespeare, Robert Burns and four muses, music, dance, tragedy and comedy, which were originally placed on the roof of the Royal Princess's Theatre and are the work of Victorian Glasgow sculptor John Mossman. The four muses are Music (Euterpe), Comedy (Thalia), Tragedy (Melpomene) and Dance (Terpsichore).

The six pillars on which they sat were once the front of the Union Bank on Ingram Street. The statues were brought down from the building after nearly a hundred years on 12 July 1977 in order to protect them from demolition work taking place at nearby Gorbals Cross. The statues were restored to the roofline of the theatre, ahead of the 2025 reopening.

== Artistic directors ==
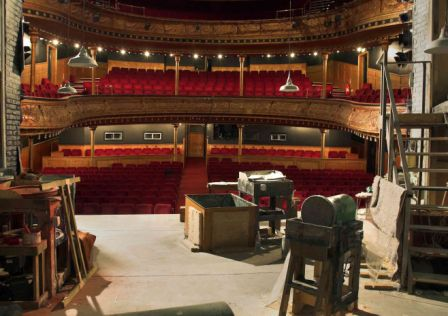
A view of the Citizens main auditorium through a Jason Southgate designed set for The Bevellers

=== Dominic Hill (2011–present) ===
Dominic Hill was Artistic Director at the Traverse Theatre, Edinburgh for the last 3 years. Prior to the Traverse, he was Co-Artistic Director (with James Brining) at Dundee Rep Theatre, a post he held for 5 years from 2003. Before joining Dundee Rep, Dominic worked as a Freelance Director, associate director at Orange Tree Theatre, Richmond, assistant director at the Royal Shakespeare Company and assistant director at Perth Theatre. He has received many accolades for his critically acclaimed productions, including numerous CATS Awards (Critics Awards for Theatre in Scotland) for amongst others, The Dark Things (Best Production 2009/10); Peer Gynt (Best Director & Best Production 2007/08); and Scenes from an Execution (Best Director 2003/04). Hill took up post in October 2011.

=== Guy Hollands (2006–2011) ===
Guy Hollands became Artistic Director of the Citizens Theatre in 2006, having previously been artistic director of TAG since 2004. After four successful years, Hollands is expected to assume a new role leading the Citizens Theatre company's creative learning portfolio in early 2011. Previous Citizens productions directed by Hollands include "Hamlet", "Waiting For Godot", "Othello", "Beauty and the Beast", "The Caretaker", "Nightingale and Chase", "The Fever" and "Ice Cream Dreams", a ground breaking work which used community actors, people in recovery and professional actors to explore Glasgow's history during the "Glasgow Ice Cream Wars". Hollands' work for children and families for TAG and on tour includes Yellow Moon, " A Taste of Honey", "King Lear", "Knives in Hens", Liar, Museum of Dreams, "Meep and Moop" and The Monster in the Hall.

=== Jeremy Raison (2003–2010) ===
Jeremy Raison was the Artistic Director of the Citizens Theatre, Glasgow from 2003 until August 2010. After seven successful years Raison directed his final production A Clockwork Orange, based on Anthony Burgess's novel in October 2010. Previous Citizens productions directed by Raison include Thérèse Raquin, Baby Doll, A Handful of Dust, Desire Under the Elms and Ghosts as well as Scottish classics The Bevellers, No Mean City and his own adaptation of The Sound of My Voice based on the novel by Ron Butlin. Raison's work for children and families in the Citizens includes The Borrowers, Charlotte's Web, James and the Giant Peach, Peter Pan, Cinderella and Wee Fairy Tales.

== Citizens Theatre alumni ==
People who have trod the boards at the Citizens Theatre or worked backstage include:

- Helen Baxendale
- Stanley Baxter
- Sean Bean
- Steven Berkoff
- Trisha Biggar - wardrobe mistress, went on to design the costumes for Star Wars: Episode I – The Phantom Menace, Star Wars: Episode II – Attack of the Clones and Star Wars: Episode III – Revenge of the Sith
- Pierce Brosnan
- Lewis Collins
- Robbie Coltrane
- Lorcan Cranitch
- Tim Curry
- Rupert Everett
- Karen Fishwick
- Henry Ian Cusick
- David Hayman
- Sam Heughan
- Greg Hicks
- Ciarán Hinds
- Celia Imrie
- Glenda Jackson
- Andrew Keir
- Julie Legrand
- Fulton Mackay
- Duncan Macrae
- Leonard Maguire
- Allison McKenzie
- Una McLean
- Ann Mitchell
- Fidelis Morgan
- Gary Oldman
- Alan Rickman
- Iain Robertson
- Tim Roth
- Laurance Rudic
- Mark Rylance
- Moira Shearer
- Rae Smith - worked as a scene painter
- Roberta Taylor
- Molly Urquhart
- Sophie Ward
- Jonathan Watson
- David Yelland

Renowned designers and directors who worked at the Citizens Theatre include:

- Maria Bjornson
- Sue Blane
- Stewart Laing
- Antony McDonald
- Philip Prowse

== TAG Theatre Company alumni ==
A number of high-profile actors have worked for TAG Theatre Company, including:

- Billy Boyd
- Robert Carlyle
- Alan Cumming
- Blythe Duff
- Forbes Masson
- Alex Norton
- Bill Paterson
- Caroline Paterson
- Jonathan Watson

=== Bibliography ===
- James Bridie and His Theatre, by Winifred Bannister (Savile), published 1955.
- The Citizens Theatre 21st Anniversary Conspectus, published 1964.
- The Citizens Theatre to the Present Day, by Tony Paterson, published 1970.
- Dr Mavor and Mr Bridie, by his son Dr Ronald Mavor, published in 1988.
- Magic in the Gorbals, A Personal Record of the Citizen's Theatre, by Cordelia Oliver, published 1999.
