= 7:84 =

Scottish left-wing theatre group

7:84 was a Scottish left-wing agitprop theatre group. The name comes from a statistic on distribution of wealth in the United Kingdom, published in The Economist in 1966, that 7% of the population of the UK owned 84% of the country's wealth.

The group was founded by playwright John McGrath, his wife Elizabeth MacLennan and her brother David MacLennan in 1971, and operated throughout Great Britain. In 1973, it split into 7:84 (England) and 7:84 (Scotland). The English group folded in 1984, having lost its grant from the Arts Council of Great Britain. Jo Beddoe joined the Scottish group as producer in 1988 until 1992; however, it lost its funding from the Scottish Arts Council in 2006, though Artistic Director Lorenzo Mele successfully secured funding for a further year from April 2007. He subsequently commissioned a series of four plays, Wound by Nicola McCartney, Eclipse by Haresh Sharma, A Time To Go by Selma Dimitrijevic, and Doch-An-Doris (A Parting Drink) by Linda McLean. Together, these short plays formed Re:Union, a production which toured Scotland in early 2007. This was followed in September 2007 by Raman Mundair's The Algebra of Freedom, which also toured extensively throughout Scotland. This production was directed by 7:84's Associate Director, Jo Ronan, and designed by David Sneddon.

On 31 December 2008, the Scottish company ceased operating, citing "the changing funding structures in Scottish theatre."

== Touring productions ==
Although much of its work centres on outreach projects throughout Scotland, 7:84 was principally known for its touring productions. The following table contains details of all 7:84's major productions that toured nationally.

Show	Director	Writer	Date
The Algebra of Freedom	Jo Ronan	Raman Mundair	5 September – 6 October 2007
Re:Union	Lorenzo Mele & Jo Ronan	Selma Dimitrijevic, Nicola McCartney, Linda McLean & Haresh Sharma	11 April – 5 May 2007
Free-Fall	Lorenzo Mele	Christopher Deans	16 February – 8 April 2006
Borderland	Lorenzo Mele	Andrew Doyle	22 September – 5 November 2005
Tipping Point	Lorenzo Mele	Davey Anderson	6 June – 3 July 2005
Boiling a Frog	Lorenzo Mele	Christopher Deans (based on the novel by Christopher Brookmyre)	3 February – 2 April 2005
Private Agenda	Lorenzo Mele	N/A	2 September – 23 October 2004
Reasons to be Cheerful	Stuart Davids	Martin McCardie	19 February – 10 April 2004
Gilt	Zinnie Harris	Stephen Greenhorn, Rona Munro & Isabel Wright	2 October – 9 November 2003
Can't Pay? Won't Pay!	Andy Arnold	Dario Fo	6 February – 22 March 2003
Factory Girls	Guy Hollands	Frank McGuinness	3 October – 9 November 2002
Cave Dwellers	Gordon Laird	Nicola McCartney	14 February – 23 March 2002
The News at When...?	Gordon Laird	N/A	23 November – 22 December 2001
Marching On	Gordon Laird	Gary Mitchell	29 March – 12 April 2001
A Little Rain	Gordon Laird	Peter Arnott	22 September – 5 November 2005
24 Hours	Iain Reekie	Frances Corr, Deirdre Heddon, Jess Kerr, Ernie Kyle, Frank Shields, Rhiannon Tise	16 March – 22 April 2000
Caledonia Dreaming	Iain Reekie	David Greig	6 June – 19 July 1999 and later revived at the 1999 Edinburgh Festival
Dissent	Iain Reekie	Stephen Greenhorn	5 November – 6 December 1998
Valley Song	Natalie Wilson	Athol Fugard	19 May – 14 June 1998
Tongues	Andrew Dawson, John Heraghty, Natalie Wilson		11–28 February 1997
Angels in America	Iain Reekie	Tony Kushner	29 March – May 1996
Born Guilty	Iain Reekie	Peter Sichrovsky	27 April – 18 June 1995
The Salt Wound	Jim Culleton	Stephen Greenhorn	21 September – 5 November 1994
The Grapes of Wrath	Iain Reekie	Frank Galati	25 February – 1 March 1994
Twilight Shift	Iain Reekie	Jackie Kay	6 October – 7 November 1993
Phoenix	Iain Reekie	Roy MacGregor	11 May – 20 June 1993
Sophocles' Antigone	Iain Reekie	Dan Taylor	23 February – 27 March 1993
The Lament for Arthur Cleary	Iain Reekie	Dermot Bolger	14 October – 21 November 1992
Scotland Matters	Iain Reekie	John Binnie, Iain Heggie, Liz Lochhead, Ann-Marie Di Mambro, Gurmeet Mattu, Rona Munro & Jimmy Reid	12 May – 6 June 1992
Jump the Life to Come	Iain Reekie	Noel Greig	6 February – 15 March 1992
The Resistible Rise of Arturo Ui	Roanna Benn	Ralf Manheim / Bertolt Brecht	4 October – 4 November 1991
Revolting Peasants	Gerard Kelly	Patricia Prior	14 May – 15 June 1991
Bold Girls	Lynne Parker	Rona Munro	27 September – 17 November 1990
Govan Stories	Roanna Benn		2–25 May 1990
When The Wind Blows	Gerard Kelly	Raymond Briggs	25 August – 7 October 1989
Road	David Hayman	Jim Cartwright	8 May – 3 June 1989
The Sash	Gerard Kelly	Hector MacMillan	24 January – 25 April 1989
Long Story Short	Finlay Welsh	Donald Campbell, James Graham, Tom Leonard, Aonghas Macneacoil, Ann Marie Di Mambro, Gureet Mattu, Rona Munro, Ricky Ross and Ann Samuel	28 February – 31 March 1989
No Mean City	Alex Norton	David Hayman	24 May – 16 July 1988
Mairi Mhor - The Woman from Skye	John McGrath	John McGrath	2 September – 17 October 1987
The Gorbals Story	David Hayman	Robert McLeish	6 May – 20 June 1987
There is a Happy Land	John McGrath	John McGrath	25 April – 7 June 1986
Beneath One Banner	David Maclennan	Sean McCarthy	13 February – 5 April 1986
The Incredible Brechin Beetle Bug	John Haswell	Matt McGinn	3 December – 16 January 1986
High Places	John Haswell	Ena Lamont Stewart	13 March – 16 May 1985
The Albannach	Finlay Welsh	John McGrath	28 February – 26 April 1985
In Time of Strife	David Hayman	Joe Corrie	7 May – 15 June 1984
The Baby and the Bathwater	John Haswell	John McGrath	19 October – 8 December 1984
The Ragged Trousered Philanthropists	David Hayman	Archie Hind	8 May – 9 June 1984
The Clydebuilt Season			10 February – 15 May 1982
Gold in his Boots	John McGrath	George Munro	
Johnny Noble	David Scase	Ewan MacColl	
Men Should Weep	Giles Havergal	Ena Lamont Stewart	
One Big Blow	John Burrows	John Burrows	1981
The Catch	John McGrath	John McGrath	15 August – 7 November 1981
Blood Red Roses	John McGrath	John McGrath	18 August – 8 November 1980
Swings and Roundabouts	John McGrath	John McGrath	26 February - 22 March 1980
Joe's Drum	Campbell Morrison	John McGrath	21 May – 22 June 1979
Thought for Today	David Maclennan	Company collaboration	10 February – 16 March 1977
Honour Your Partners	David Maclennan	David Maclennan	27 January – 10 April 1976
Little Red Hen	John McGrath		16 September – 13 December 1975
The Cheviot, the Stag, and the Black Black Oil	John McGrath		31 March – June 1973
The Game’s a Bogey	John McGrath		1974

== Notable people ==
- Jo Beddoe
- Henry Ian Cusick
- Dick Gaughan
- Bill Paterson
- David Hayman
- Douglas Henshall
- Valerie Lilley
- Steve McNicholas
- Cathy-Ann McPhee
- Dolina MacLennan
- Hilton McRae
- Alexander Morton
- Peter Mullan
- Alex Norton
- David Paisley
- Laurance Rudic
- David Tennant
- The Flying Pickets

== Reviews ==
- Findlay, Bill (1982), review of Clydebuilt: A season of Scottish Popular Drama from the '20s, '30s and '40s, in Hearn, Sheila G. (ed.), Cencrastus No. 10, Autumn 1982, p. 39, ISSN 0264-0856
