= Dolina MacLennan =

Scottish traditional singer, actress and writer (born 1938)

- Born: 1 January 1938 (age 88); Marvig, Isle of Lewis
- Occupations: Scottish traditional singer, writer and actress
- Writing career
- Language: Scottish Gaelic, English
- Subjects: Memoir, radio series
- Notable work: An Island Girl's Journey
- Notable awards: Saltire Society Fletcher of Saltoun Award (2012) Services to Gaelic Award (2016) Scottish Traditional Music Hall of Fame (2016)

Dolina "Doli" MacLennan (1 January 1938) is a Scottish traditional singer, actor, writer and Gaelic broadcaster. She was a mainstay of the Scottish folk music revival in the 1960s and '70s. She starred in the Gaelic TV series Machair and in the play The Cheviot, the Stag and the Black, Black Oil. Her memoir An Island Girl's Journey was published in 2014. She was inducted into the Scottish Traditional Music Hall of Fame in 2016.

== Early life and education ==
Dolina MacLennan was born in Marvig on the Isle of Lewis on 1 January 1938 (Ne'er Day in Scots). Her parents were Angus MacLennan and Mary Bell Mackenzie. She was one of seven children. Her brother, Murdo, became a precentor of the Free Church. She attended Planasker School, and later the Nicolson Institute on Stornaway. There she was introduced to Gaelic poems and stories as well as amateur dramatics.

She went to Edinburgh to study Occupational Therapy, where she met Hamish Henderson and Stuart MacGregor, founders of the Edinburgh University Folk Song Society, and became a mainstay of the folk music revival scene in Scotland. She was a regular at the Waverley Bar and in the Howff venues in Edinburgh. One of these sessions was recorded for the BBC Scotland TV show Hootenannie.

== Career ==
In 1962, MacLennan performed at the Edinburgh Festival, the first time folk music had featured in the festival. The concert, Plain Song and All That Jazz, included Rory and Alex McEwen, the Clancy Brothers, Al Fairweather, George Melly and others. It was televised and broadcast on BBC on 4 September 1962.

MacLennan featured in Beagan Gaidhlig, the first Gaelic-language learning series on Scottish TV. She also had a singing role in An Clo Mòr (The Big Cloth), a Scottish Ballet production about a Gaelic legend. MacLennan starred in the play The Cheviot, the Stag and the Black, Black Oil, a production by 7:84 theatre company. The play toured Scotland and tackled themes such as the Highland Clearances, poverty and the exploitation of oil in the North Sea.

MacLennan was the first Gaelic speaker to present the radio programme 12 Noon on BBC Radio Scotland. She has been a regular presenter and scriptwriter for Gaelic radio programmes. In 1976 she wrote Na Moireasdanaich (The Morrisons), a Gaelic radio soap opera. She later appeared in all 12 seasons of the Gaelic TV series Machair (1993–1999). She appeared in the Gaelic film Seachd: The Inaccessible Pinnacle (2007), as well as An Ceasnachadh (2000), The Legend of Barney Thomson (2015) and The Queen (2006).

Her memoir, An Island Girl's Journey, was published in 2014 by The Islands Book Trust. It emerged from recorded conversations with Jim Gilchrist and Dr Stuart Eydmann, who was then traditional artist in residence at the Department of Celtic and Scottish studies of the University of Edinburgh. Her reminiscences with Domhnall Uilleam Stiubhart were broadcast on BBC Alba as Dolina in 2012.

In 2014, MacLennan delivered the Hamish Henderson Lecture at Edinburgh City Chambers, as part of the Carrying Stream Festival, a celebration of Henderson's life and legacy. Her lecture was entitled Hamish, My Big Pal. She delivered the Angus "Ease" Macleod Memorial Lecture in 2022, entitled Buaidh Bàrdachd (The Power of Poetry).

She is part of the Metagama, An Atlantic Odyssey ensemble, a stage show premiered in 2023 and since touring around Scotland. It explores the migration of young people from the Isle of Lewis to Canada on board the SS Metagama in 1923, and the impact on those that left and those left behind. A soundtrack of the production was recorded in 2025.

== Music ==
- 1961 – By Mormond Braes (EP), with Robin Gray, Topic Records TOP68
- 1963 – "Gaelic Song", on Edinburgh Folk Festival Vol. 1 (various artists), Decca. From the sleeve notes: "This lovely slow air is sung by DOLINA MACLENNAN. Born in the island of Lewis, Dolina is a young singer of rare quality and power who has been singing in English and Gaelic in Edinburgh for several years."
- 1964 – "Mouth Music", on Edinburgh Folk Festival Vol. 2 (compilation), Decca
- 1976 – "Freedom Come All Ye" (with Andy Hunter), on Freedom Come All Ye - The Poems and Songs of Hamish Henderson (various artists), Claddagh Records
- 2006 – "Fil U O Ru Hu O", "Hug O Ran O Ru", "Port A Beul", "Bratach Bana" (with Robin Gray), on Bonnie Lass Come O'er the Burn (various artists), Topic Records
- 2017 – featured on the album Gràdh is Gonadh – Guth ag aithris (Love and Loss – A Lone Voice) by Christine Primrose, Temple Records
- 2018 – "Tha Mi Duilich", on Scotland's Voices (various artists)
- 2025 – "The Letter", on Metagama - An Atlantic Odyssey (various artists). Eligible for Scottish Album of the Year Award 2026

== Awards and recognition ==
- Saltire Society Fletcher of Saltoun Award (2012)
- Services to Gaelic Award (2016)
- Scottish Traditional Music Hall of Fame (2016)
- Doctor honoris causa, University of Edinburgh (2016)

== Later life ==
MacLennan moved to Blair Atholl in highland Perthshire where she ran a guesthouse called Woodlands. She has also campaigned for Scottish independence. She performed at the Edinburgh Festival for the 60th consecutive year in 2018.

Her 80th birthday was celebrated in 2018 at the Blas festival, organised by Fèisean nan Gàidheal, and featuring Pàdruig Morrison, Christine Primrose and Seasaidh Lexy.
