= Stephen Greenhorn =

Scottish playwright and screenwriter

- Born: 5 September 1964 (age 61); Fauldhouse, West Lothian, Scotland
- Occupations: playwright, writer
- Known for: Doctor Who ("The Lazarus Experiment", "The Doctor's Daughter"), River City, Sunshine on Leith

Stephen Greenhorn (born 5 September 1964) is a Scottish playwright and screenwriter. He is the creator of the BBC Scotland soap opera River City.

== Theatre ==
Greenhorn’s plays have been produced by a wide variety of theatre companies across the UK as well as on BBC Radio and several have been published.

Original or adapted works for the stage include: The Salt Wound (1994), Dissent (1998), and Gilt (2003) for 7:84 theatre group; Passing Places (1997) and The Ballad of Crazy Paolo (2001) for the Traverse Theatre; Sleeping Around (1998) with Abi Morgan, Mark Ravenhill and Hilary Fannin for Paines Plough touring theatre and King Matt (2001) for TAG Theatre Company.

Passing Places won the author a nomination for Scottish Writer of the Year in 1998 and has since been translated many times and produced worldwide.

In 2007 he created Sunshine on Leith for Dundee Rep – a musical featuring the songs of The Proclaimers. The show won the TMA Award for Best Musical that year and has toured several times since. A film version was released in 2013. Greenhorn adapted it for the big screen. The film was shot in Glasgow and Edinburgh in late 2012 starring Peter Mullan and Jane Horrocks and was directed by Dexter Fletcher.

== Television ==
Greenhorn’s TV work includes episodes of The Bill and Where The Heart Is. For BBC One he has written the six-part drama series Glasgow Kiss (2000) and the feature-length drama Derailed (2005). His adaptation of Jean Rhys's novel Wide Sargasso Sea was screened on BBC Four in 2006.

Greenhorn has written two episodes for the science fiction series Doctor Who: "The Lazarus Experiment" in Series 3 (2007) and "The Doctor's Daughter" in Series 4 (2008). He also wrote a comic strip, Mind Shadows, which was featured on the Doctor Who website in 2008.

Another television project, Marchlands, a five-part supernatural drama starring Alex Kingston, aired on ITV in early 2011. Greenhorn penned the series, which was based on The Oaks, a U.S. television pilot which wasn't aired. He wrote for the 2021 epic miniseries Around the World in 80 Days, reuniting him with David Tennant. He is set to adapt the young adult novel Last Lesson for Red Planet Pictures.
