= Sunshine on Leith (musical) =

- Music: The Proclaimers
- Lyrics: The Proclaimers
- Book: Stephen Greenhorn
- Premiere: 2007: Dundee Rep

Sunshine on Leith is a stage musical featuring the songs of The Proclaimers and written by Stephen Greenhorn for the Dundee Rep Ensemble and first performed in 2007. The show won the TMA Award for Best Musical that year and has toured several times since.

A film adaptation was completed in 2013, and screened in the Special Presentation section at the 2013 Toronto International Film Festival.

The West Yorkshire Playhouse staged a new production in 2018, directed by James Brining. Various productions of the musical have been staged at the Edinburgh Festival Fringe as recently as 2026.
