= Robert David MacDonald =

Scottish playwright and theatre director

Robert David MacDonald (27 August 1929 – 19 May 2004) was a Scottish playwright, translator and theatre director.

== Early life ==
Robert David MacDonald was born in Elgin, in Morayshire, Scotland on 27 August 1929, the son of a doctor and a tobacco company executive. He attended Wellington School, then studied modern history at Magdalen College at Oxford University, and later trained as a conductor at the Royal College of Music and the Munich Conservatory.

== Career as a director ==
MacDonald spent some years as a translator for UNESCO, where he met German director Erwin Piscator in 1957, leading to his involvement in theatre as a director. His collaboration with Piscator also led to his first significant success, when he translated Piscator's version of War and Peace in 1962. This was televised by Granada Television as well as being performed on Broadway for two years.

He became assistant director at Glyndebourne and the Royal Opera at Royal Opera House, Covent Garden, before becoming artistic director of Her Majesty's Theatre at Carlisle.

In 1970, he became co-artistic director of the Citizens Theatre in Glasgow, until his retirement in May 2003. During that time, he directed 50 productions and wrote fifteen plays for the company, including The De Sade Show (1975), Chinchilla (1977), Summit Conference (1978 – later seen in the West End with Glenda Jackson, Georgina Hale and Gary Oldman), A Waste of Time (1980), Don Juan (1980), Webster (1983), In Quest of Conscience (1994), Britannicus (2002) and Cheri (2003). In March 1989, he directed a production of John Home's Douglas, with Angela Chadfield in the role of Lady Randolph.

== Translations ==
MacDonald translated over 70 plays and operas from ten different languages. In her obituary for MacDonald, Sarah Jones wrote "...it was for his translations, stemming from his ability to speak at least eight languages fluently, that MacDonald may well be best remembered. He brought a diet of Goethe, Lermontov, Gogol, Goldoni and Racine, not only to Glasgow audiences, but to those around Europe and America...".

He translated five of Friedrich Schiller's plays, which led Michael Billington to write in 2005, "why is Schiller no longer box-office poison? The first crucial fact is that actable versions of the plays are now readily available. MacDonald was the great pioneer in this area, but Jeremy Sams, Francis Lamport, Mike Poulton and several others have also rid the plays of swagger and fustian."

One of MacDonald's early successes was War and Peace, which he had translated from Erwin Piscator's 1955 German stage adaptation of Tolstoy's novel. MacDonald's version reached Broadway in 1967.

With Giles Havergal, he adapted Thomas Mann's novella Death in Venice for a one-man production in 1999. Following a run in Glasgow, the production has traveled to several theaters in Europe and the USA.

His translation of Racine's Phèdre, titled Phedra, was produced at The Old Vic in November 1984, designed and directed by Philip Prowse and with Glenda Jackson in the title role and Robert Eddison as Theramenes.

== Death ==
MacDonald died of a heart attack, aged 74.
