= Raman Mundair =

British poet, writer, artist and playwright

Raman Mundair (Punjabi: ਰਮਨ ਮੰਡੈਰ) is a British poet, writer, artist and playwright. She was born in Ludhiana, India and moved to live in the UK at the age of five. She is the author of two volumes of poetry, A Choreographer's Cartography and Lovers, Liars, Conjurers and Thieves – both published by Peepal Tree Press – and The Algebra of Freedom (a play) published by Aurora Metro Press. She edited Incoming – Some Shetland Voices – published by Shetland Heritage Publications.She also moved to Manchester at the age of 5. Mundair was educated at the School of Oriental and African Studies, University of London, and has performed readings of her work at numerous venues Raman's work has been anthologised and received reviews in publications including The Independent, The Herald, World Literature Today and Discovering Scottish.

== Career ==
In 2013 and 2014 Raman was a Leverhulme Artist in Residence for Shetland Museum and Archives and one of seven writers from Shetland and Orkney, participating in the University of Edinburgh’s "Writing the North" project.

Raman was chosen as one of two British writers to participate in the Word Express, Literature Across Frontiers project. Word Express took 20 young writers from 12 European countries by train through South-East Europe to Turkey, where they took part in readings and literary events in every country they passed through and then took part in the Istanbul Tanpinar Literature Festival and the Istanbul Book Fair).

In 2008 Mundair was nominated for the Rolex Mentor and Protégé Arts Initiative. In 2008 Mundair won a Robert Louis Stevenson Award and became a Robert Louis Stevenson Fellow at the Hotel Chevillon in Grez-sur-Loing, France. In this same year she was invited to become Scottish Poetry Library Poet Partner for East Dumbarton.

In 2007 she was awarded the Arts Council England International Fellowship at the India International Centre in Delhi and in 2006 Mundair was runner up in the Penguin Decibel Prize for Short Fiction.

Raman has been Writer in Residence in Stockholm, New Delhi, Glasgow and the Shetland Islands and has represented The British Council as a writer, workshop facilitator and performer internationally. She is a sought after facilitator of creative writing workshops and her client list ranges from schools and universities to the British Council and Amnesty International. Raman is a member of Scottish PEN.

As a playwright Raman was awarded a mentorship with the Playwrights Studio Scotland in 2005. In 2007 her play ‘The Algebra of Freedom’ was produced to great acclaim by 7:84 Theatre Company and in 2006 she collaborated with the National Theatre Scotland and Òran Mòr – A Play, A Pie, A Pint on Side Effects, a one-act play, which went on to tour Glasgow, Edinburgh and Dublin.

Raman was one of the 24 writers chosen by the Royal Court Theatre and the BBC in 2008 for their 24 Degrees project which nurtures and develops work by the "next generation of promising new writers in Britain".

As an artist she makes work that represents text and narrative in a visual form. She has collaborated with artist Pernille Spence, filmmaker, Lotta Petronella and new media artist Sean Clark. Her work has been exhibited at Shetland Museum and Archive, the Gallery of Modern Art Glasgow, City Art Gallery, Leicester and the Kevin Kavanagh Gallery, Dublin. In 2011, as part of her Leafing the Green writer's residency, she was commissioned by Aberdeen City Council to create the Secrets of the Green – an interactive poetry plaque installation on the Green in Aberdeen city centre.

In 2008 Raman was invited to read at the Scottish Government EU office in Brussels and gave the "reply to the lads" speech at their official Burn’s Supper. She was identified by a national literary survey of Scottish writing as being an exciting, new rising literary voice (Discovering Scottish Literature – A Contemporary Overview, 2008).

Mundair was elected a Fellow of the Royal Society of Literature in 2022.

== Early life ==
Mundair was born in Ludhiana, Punjab, India and migrated with her Mother to Manchester, England in the 70s. She is a first-generation British Asian but resists pigeon-holing saying that she refuses to "reduce my identity just so that binary minds can read me." She lived in Manchester until she was fifteen and then moved to Loughborough (UK). She left the East Midlands (UK) to study History at the School of Oriental and African Studies, University of London.

== Poetry ==
Mundair's first collection of poetry, Lovers, Liars, Conjurers and Thieves, was published by Peepal Tree Press in 2003. Recent work includes commissioned poems for Ilkley Literature festival, Allegories of Power residency and Edinburgh University’s Writing the North project.

Her book A Choreographer's Cartography was published by Peepal Tree Press in 2007 and is about the transcendence of boundaries and boundary crossing, ranging from migration to language.

Mundair has taught and run workshops and also been poet in residence at various places ranging from Stockholm University, to the Shetland Islands. She has taught Creative Writing at postgraduate level and South Asian Literature at under graduate level at Loughborough University.

== Prose ==
Mundair was runner up in the Penguin Decibel Prize for Short Fiction in 2006. Her collection of short stories – In The Light of Other will be published in 2009.

== Plays ==
Side Effects – a site/cast specific collaboration with the National Theatre Scotland opened in August 2006 at the Oran Mor in Glasgow and toured to Edinburgh and Dublin.

== Publications ==
- A Choreographer’s Cartography (Peepal Tree Press, 2007)
- The Algebra of Freedom (Aurora Metro Press, 2007)
- Lovers, Liars, Conjurers and Thieves (Peepal Tree Press, 2003)
- Incoming – Some Shetland Voices (Shetland Heritage Publications, 2014) – editor and contributor

Mundair’s work has been anthologised in the following:

- The Women Writers Handbook (Aurora Metro Books, 2020)
- Archipelagos, writing the north project (Edinburgh University Press, 2014)
- Conversations About Empires (Ilkley Literature Festival, 2012)
- Out of Bounds (Bloodaxe, 2012)
- The Harper Collins Book of English Poetry (Harper Collins India, 2012)
- The New Shetlander, Yule Issue (SISS, 2011)
- ImagiNation, Stories of Scotland’s Future (Big Sky Press, 2011)
- These Island We Sing (Polygon Birlinn, 2011)
- Departures and Arrivals (Scottish PEN, 2009)
- Red (Peepal Tree Press, 2009)
- The New Anthem (Tranquebar Press, 2009)
- One Poem in Search of a Translator: Rewriting Les Fenêtres by Apollinaire (Peter Lang, 2008)
- Atlas 02, (Aark Arts, 2007)
- Addicted to Brightness (Long Lunch Press, 2006)
- Sable – Autumn/Fall 06 Issue (Sable Publishing, 2006)
- 60/60, Daemon 7 & 8 (Survivors Press, 2005)
- Freedom Spring (Waverley Books, 2005)
- Poetry Scotland, Summer 2005, (Diehard publishers, 2005)
- Acuman, New Voices, Issue 51 (The Ember Press 2005)
- Kavya Bharati, Poetry of the Indian Diaspora, No. 16, 2004 (The Study for Indian Literature in English and Translation, 2004)
- Swedish Reflections (Arcadia, 2003).
- Markings – New Writing and Art from Dumfries and Galloway: Volume 16 (Kirkcudbright/Scottish Arts Council, 2003)
- The New Shetlander, Hairst Issue (SISS, 2003)
- Sable – Spring/Summer03 Issue (Sable Publishing, 2003)
- Calabash, Winter 2002, (Centreprise, 2002)
- The New Shetlander, Voar Issue (SISS, 2002)
- The Redbeck Anthology of British South Asian Poetry (Redbeck, 2000)
- Bittersweet: Contemporary Black Women's Poetry (The Women's Press, 1998)
- The Fire People: A Collection of Contemporary Black British Poets (Payback Press/Canongate Books, 1998)

Mundair wrote the introduction to Red Threads, P. Desai and P. Sekhon (Diva/Miillivres, 2003), a collection of photographs by British Asian queer photographers.

== Visual art ==
2014

- the incoming project (installation), Shetland Museum and Archives

2011

- A Servant’s Tale at Coast Festival (site-specific installation for the Coast Festival), a collaboration with artists Margaret Stewart and Elspeth Winram from the Itchee Wasp Collective. The work was exhibited in the East Pavilion of Banff Castle, Scotland and draws on the perceived history and hidden narratives of Banff Castle.

2008

- Here Now, There Now (site-specific, text/performance/installation), a collaboration with artist and Creative Scotland award winner Pernille Spence (Scotland), exhibited along Scot Rail routes in Scotland on 4–6 June.

2007

- Amygdalae (text – part of a performance/installation), a collaboration with Irish artist, Maedhbh McMohan at the Kevin Kavanagh Gallery, Dublin, Ireland

2005

- Voice/Over (text/film installation) at the Gallery of Modern Art, Glasgow
- Noctuary (film). A triptych of three short films: Pavor Nocturnus, Apnea & Cataplexia explore the effects of domestic violence on sleep. The films were originally exhibited at the Gallery of Modern Art, Glasgow as part of the Elbow Room season. A collaboration with Finnish filmmaker Lotta Petronella.
- A Choreographer's Cartography, (new media/text installation), Leicester City Gallery
- Black Pepper Dreams (text/ billboard exhibit and online installation), as part of ArchiTexts 2005

2004

- Awarded Flax Art Studio Residency, Belfast. Residency resulted in Answer Me A Question, a text piece, disseminated throughout the city using a series of postcards.
- Participating artist (text/photography/video installation) in the Rule of Thumb exhibition at the Gallery of Modern Art, Glasgow

2003

- TXT ME (new media installation) [part of 'FOLD'], at the Leicester City Art Gallery

2000

- Let Me Hold You (installation) – part of Fragments of Identity exhibition, at The Generator Gallery, Loughborough

== Sources ==
- Raman Mundair at www.contemporarywriters.com
- Raman Mundair commissioned poems and dialogue in the Writing The North project, Edinburgh University, 2014
- PDF download of commissioned poems by Raman Mundair for Ilkley Literature Festival, 2011
- artist collaboration with Pernille Spence
- the incoming project by Raman Mundair, Leverhulme Artist in Residence, Shetland Museum and Archives
- A Choreographer's Cartography: description, video and audio from exhibition
- Raman Mundair text installation for Architexts 2005 on Indian soldiers in World War 1
