= The Cheviot, the Stag and the Black, Black Oil =

Play by John McGrath

- Original language: English; Scottish Gaelic
- Written by: John McGrath
- Characters: Sellar; Duke; Minister; Whitehall; John McGrath; Stage Management; Indian; Crofter; Gaelic Singer; Janet; Mary MacPherson; Gaelic tutor; Old Woman; Lady Phosphate; HB Stowe; Accordionist; Queen Victoria; Singer; Donald Macleod; Selkirk; Polwarth; Roustabout; Guitar; Banjo; MC; Loch; Sturdy Highlander; McChuckemup; Texas Jim; Fiddle; Musicman
- Subject: Scottish history
- Genre: Agit-prop
- Setting: Scottish Highlands, 1746–1970s

Premiere
- Date: 31 March 1973
- Place: Aberdeen Arts Centre
- www.bloomsbury.com/uk/cheviot-the-stag-and-the-black-black-oil-9781350135079/

The Cheviot, the Stag and the Black, Black Oil is a play written in the 1970s by Merseyside-born playwright John McGrath. From 31 March 1973, beginning at Aberdeen Arts Centre, it was performed in a touring production in community centres on Scotland by 7:84 and other community theatre groups. A television version directed by John Mackenzie was broadcast on 6 June 1974 by the BBC as part of the Play for Today series.

== Plot ==
A musical drama, Cheviot recounts the history of economic change in the Scottish Highlands, from the Highland Clearances in the early 19th century through to the contemporary oil boom at the time of its first production. The 7:84 Touring Theatre Company presents its live stage play to the people of South and North Uist, Benbecula and Lewis. The stage play is mixed with filmed reconstructions of documented events in the Highland Clearances, darkly humorous songs and sketches and, later, interviews with those participating and affected by the North Sea oil industry in 1974.

In the play, Scotland is imagined from 270 miles above the Earth, a castle is seen from a helicopter, land mixes with water, seabirds, fiddle music; people enter the presentation in a community hall. There are images of giant earth-moving equipment, sheep, stag, a gas flare, then the faces of the locals watching the play – some are baffled, some sceptical, some participating, particularly in a song sung in Scottish Gaelic.

Each sketch and reconstruction is supported by a continuous narration of facts and statistics, presenting an account of Scottish history from 1746 to 1974. Scenes describe 60 years of poverty, abuse and small scale eviction endured by the crofting tenants of the Highlands from 1746 – "Culloden and all that" – when speaking, singing or writing Scottish Gaelic and the wearing of the plaid were forcibly forbidden by the government.

The sudden expansion of English and Scottish capital and estate enlargement – "more money to buy more land" – at the beginning of the 19th century is outlined next. Patrick Sellar, a factor of the Duke of Sutherland, is introduced. His systemised evictions of the Highlanders were the broadest and most brutal of all the Clearances, and he is evoked as representative of the issues of land ownership in the Highlands and Islands and the north of Scotland. With frequent shots of the audience the play gives dispassionate readings of the equally dispassionate contemporary accounts of the brutality involved in evicting Highland crofting tenants to make way for the more profitable Cheviot, and later Blackface, sheep.

The reasons for the Clearances are explained and how they were enabled for the 'ruling classes' with the connivance of the church, the Law, the police and the military. It details where the people went: often to allotments on the seashore with wretched soil and conditions, where they were supposed to fish and gather kelp for the soda ash industry. It details the economic reasons why the men were often away south for much of the year, trying to find work to pay the rents on their crofts, or in the Highland regiments defending the British Empire. It also details the emigrations to the Victorian slums of Glasgow and to the rest of the world.

The few, but hugely important, successful instances of organised resistance to the evictions feature. It lists political resistance to the evictions such as the Land Leagues of the 1880s, which are contrasted with the Victorian landed gentry's passion for stag hunting; this and the sheep industry now having taken over many millions of acres. The land raids by crofters in the early 20th century are mentioned.

The play briefly mentions the modern day (1974) exploitation of the Highlands by the tourist industry then makes political comparisons between the past and 1974. McGrath explained in 1981: "At the first sniff of oil off the east coast of Scotland, things began to jump. First in Aberdeen and the North-East. Then all over. Suddenly villages that did not merit even an advance factory for 100 workers are being taken over by thousands of men in labour camps building oil-rigs, and oil-production platforms."

Oilmen at Aberdeen are interviewed about conditions, health and safety at work and wages. These are followed by interviews with American oil bosses and members of the population of Aberdeen and on issues such as the unaffordability of housing after the oil boom.

The play details the political history of North Sea oil from the North Sea gas explorations of 1962, and explores issues of shore and village destruction and pollution, accompanied by shots of refineries and plant. It explains that exploration is now looking to the West and has in fact already started off the Butt of Lewis.

With a final montage of images from 1746 to the Aberdeen riggers, the performers tell audience members that this is their land and urges them to resist exploitation, warning them that they will find the oil corporations even more insensitive than Patrick Sellar.

== Cast ==
Cast of original production
Sellar / Duke / Minister / Whitehall, etc.	John Bett
John McGrath	John McGrath
Stage Management / Red Indian / Crofter, etc.	David MacLennan
Gaelic Singer / Janet / Mary MacPherson / Gaelic tuition, etc.	Dolina MacLennan
Old Woman / Lady Phosphate / HB Stowe / Accordion, etc.	Elizabeth MacLennan
Stage Management / Admin / Queen Victoria, etc	Chris Martin
Singer / Donald Macleod / Selkirk / Polwarth / Roustabout / Guitar / Banjo, etc.	Alex Norton
MC / Loch / Sturdy Highlander / McChuckemup / Texas Jim / Vocals, etc	Bill Paterson
Fiddle / Red Indian / Crofter / Bass guitar / Musicman	Allan Ross
