= Guy McCrone =

Scottish author (1898–1977)

Guy Fulton McCrone
- Born: 13 September 1898; Birkenhead, England
- Died: 30 May 1977 (aged 78)
- Education: Pembroke College, Cambridge
- Occupation: Author
- Known for: Founding member of the Glasgow Citizen's Theatre

Guy Fulton McCrone (13 September 1898 – 30 May 1977) was a Scottish writer active from the late 1930s onwards. He was born in Birkenhead to Scottish parents. After the family returned to their native Glasgow, McCrone was educated at The Glasgow Academy, then went on to read for a degree in Modern Languages at Pembroke College, Cambridge, after which he travelled to Vienna, where he studied singing. Returning to Scotland, he organised the first British performance of Berlioz's Les Troyens and was a founding member of the Glasgow Citizen's Theatre, together with his cousin, the playwright Osborne Henry Mavor.

Glasgow provided the setting for many of his novels, including the most widely read, Antimacassar City, The Philistines and The Puritans, begun in 1940 and which were later published as Wax Fruit: the Story of the Moorhouse Family in 1947, It eventually sold one million copies. These were two sequels, Aunt Bel (1949) and The Hayburn Family (1952).

McCrone retired to the Lake District in 1968, where he died at Windermere on 30 May 1977.

In October 2012, Antimacassar City was dramatised in ten parts by Clara Glynn for BBC Radio 4's Woman's Hour, starring Natasha Watson, Ian Brennan, Juliet Cadzow and Robin Laing.

== Bibliography ==
- —— (1937). The Striped Umbrella.
- —— (1940). Antimacassar City.
- —— (1947). Wax Fruit: the Story of the Moorhouse Family.
  - A trilogy, comprising Antimacassar City, The Philistines, and The Puritans (1947)
- —— (1949). Aunt Bel.
- —— (1952). The Hayburn Family.
- —— (1955). James & Charlotte.
- —— (1961). An Independent Young Man.
