= Robert Robertson (actor) =

Scottish actor

- Born: 3 July 1930; St. Andrews, Fife, Scotland
- Died: 17 January 2001 (aged 70); Perth, Scotland
- Occupations: actor, artistic director

Robert Robertson (3 July 1930 – 17 January 2001) was a Scottish actor and theatre director. He was best known for playing Doctor Stephen Andrews in the television show Taggart.

== Biography ==
Robertson was born in St Andrews, Fife. His acting career started with the Manchester Repertory Theatre shortly after World War II. He moved to London appearing in a variety of roles most notably as Dr Grimwig in Oliver!, Lionel Bart's acclaimed Dickens musical, at the New Theatre. Robertson also wrote and performed his own one-man show, Your Humble Servant, at the Open Space Theatre, London.

In 1973 Robertson returned to Scotland to perform in Dundee and stayed. He acted and directed with the Dundee Repertory Theatre, serving as the company's artistic director from 1976 to 1992. On stage he played Willy Loman in Death of a Salesman and Frank in Educating Rita. He directed The Importance of Being Earnest, The Tempest and The Cherry Orchard. Robertson also oversaw the move to a new purpose-built theatre in the centre of Dundee.

In 1983 he was cast in the three-part pilot of Taggart as Dr Stephen Andrews. The show became an international success and Robertson became famous for his role as the pathologist. He appeared in 51 episodes of the show.

Other notable television appearances include The Ambassadors of Death, a Doctor Who serial in 1970 and the role of Palanguez in the BBC's The Day of the Triffids. On the big screen Robertson appeared in the 1996 film Breaking the Waves, directed by Lars von Trier.

Robertson died on 17 January 2001, at the age of 70, after suffering a heart attack while reading a Robert Burns poem, Holy Willie's Prayer, on stage in Perth. He was rushed to hospital, where he succumbed shortly afterwards to heart failure (cardiovascular disease).
