= Travels with My Aunt (play) =

1989 comedy play based on the 1969 novel

- Original language: English
- Written by: Graham Greene; Giles Havergal
- Genre: Comedy

Premiere
- Date: 10 November 1989
- Place: Citizens Theatre; Glasgow, Scotland

Travels with My Aunt is a 1989 comedy adapted by Scottish dramatist by Giles Havergal from Graham Greene's novel of the same title. The play was first staged at Citizens Theatre in Glasgow on 10 November 1989 with Havergal, Derwent Watson, Patrick Hannaway, and Christopher Gee, and has been performed in London West End theatres, off-Broadway in New York, and in San Francisco.

From 2 May to 29 June 2013, Travels with My Aunt was staged at London's Menier Chocolate Factory, starring David Bamber and Jonathan Hyde.

This stage version was reduced to a 50-minute, one-act version (with permission from Havergal) and first presented by the Backwell Playhouse Theatre Company as an entry into the Avon Association of Drama One Act Festival on 21 February 2015.

The two-act version was revived at the Citizens Theatre in May 2017.
