= Travels with My Aunt =

1969 novel by Graham Greene

- First edition
- Author: Graham Greene
- Language: English
- Publisher: The Bodley Head
- Publication date: 1969
- Publication place: United Kingdom
- Media type: Print (hardcover)
- Pages: 319 pp (First Edition)
- ISBN: 0-14-018501-1
- Preceded by: The Comedians
- Followed by: The Honorary Consul

Travels with My Aunt (1969) is a novel written by English author Graham Greene.

The novel follows the travels of Henry Pulling, a retired bank manager, and his eccentric Aunt Augusta as they find their way across Europe, and eventually even further afield. Aunt Augusta pulls Henry away from his quiet suburban existence into a world of adventure, crime and the highly unconventional details of her past.

== Plot summary ==
The novel's narrator is Henry Pulling, a conventional and uncharming bank manager who has taken early retirement in a suburban home, and who has little to look for except for tending the dahlias in his garden, reading the complete works of Walter Scott left by his father, and some bickering with the ultra-conservative retired major living next door. The main choice he could still make is either to remain a bachelor or marry Miss Keene, who likes tatting and who might become his boring and respectable suburban wife.

His life suddenly changes when he meets his septuagenarian Aunt Augusta for the first time in over 50 years at his mother's funeral. Despite having little in common, they form a bond. On their first meeting, Augusta tells Henry that his mother was not truly his mother, and we learn that Henry's father has been dead for more than 40 years.

As they leave the funeral, Henry goes to Augusta's house and meets her lover Wordsworth – a man from Sierra Leone, who is deeply and passionately in love with her despite her being 75 years old. Henry finds himself drawn into Aunt Augusta's world of travel, adventure, romance and absence of bigotry.

He travels first with her to Brighton, where he meets one of his aunt's old acquaintances, and gains an insight into one of her many past lives. Here a psychic foreshadows that he will have many travels in the near future. This prediction inevitably becomes true as Henry is pulled further and further into his aunt's lifestyle, and delves deeper into her past.

Their voyages take them from Paris to Istanbul on the Orient Express; and as the journey unfolds, so do the stories of Aunt Augusta, painting the picture of a woman for whom love has been the defining feature of her life. He finds her to be amoral, contemptuous of conventional morality, having had numerous lovers and speaking forthrightly of having been a courtesan and prostitute in France and Italy. She is also no great respecter of the law, being involved in complicated scams and smuggling and being extremely good at outwitting the police of various countries – in which her nephew becomes her willing accomplice.

Adding to Henry's departure from his middle class mindset is his contact with Tooley, a young American female hippie who takes a liking to him, gets him to smoke marijuana with her and shares with him her own life story, her estrangement from her father who is a CIA operative, her complicated love life, and especially her concern that she may be pregnant. She is, in effect, a younger version of Aunt Augusta.

After tangling with the Turkish police and successfully hiding from them Aunt Augusta's contraband gold ingot, the aunt and nephew duo are deported from Turkey back to England. Henry returns to his quiet retirement, but tending his garden no longer holds the same allure to him. When he receives a letter from his aunt, he finally renounces his old life irrevocably to join her and the love of her life in South America.

By the book's end Henry has adopted Aunt Augusta's amoral outlook, and ends up in Paraguay, taking up the risky but highly profitable life of a smuggler illicitly running cigarettes and alcoholic drinks into Argentina – in partnership with his aunt and her lover Visconti, an escaped collaborator with the Nazis. Having on his arrival been beaten up and imprisoned by the police force of the dictator Stroessner, Henry eventually establishes a mutually profitable relationship with the police, with the help of the local CIA agent Mr. Tooley – the father of the hippie girl he met on the Orient Express. When last seen, Henry is busy making himself fluent in the Native American Guarani language, spoken by many of his smuggling associates, and is preparing to marry the daughter of the corrupt, bribe-taking Chief of Customs, once she turns sixteen. Meanwhile, on the other side of the South Atlantic Miss Keene, whom Henry might have married, had immigrated to South Africa and is shocked to find herself adapting to her new, Apartheid-supporting environment and increasingly taking up its prevailing opinions.

As the story progresses it becomes apparent (though only explicitly acknowledged by Henry in the book's final pages) that Aunt Augusta is actually his mother and his presumed mother was actually his aunt. Her re-connection with him at her sister's funeral marked the beginning of her reclamation of her child.

== Characters ==
The plot revolves around two main characters: Henry and Aunt Augusta.

- Henry Pulling: A man in his mid-50s who worked his entire life as a banker. When the bank was bought, he took early retirement and took up gardening and tending his Dahlias. Over the course of his travels with Aunt Augusta, Henry is transformed from a character who longs for the safety and predictability of a quiet life to one who seeks adventure.
- Aunt Augusta is the opposite of Henry. She is an amoral character who revels in sexual adventure and small-time swindles. She has worked as a prostitute and had several intense love affairs that she describes to Henry on their travels. The most important of these love affairs was one with Henry's father when she became pregnant with Henry, and another with a man named Mr Visconti. If Henry is on a journey from safety to adventure, Aunt Augusta is on a two-fold journey to reconnect with Henry, the son she now can know since his mother has died, and with Visconti, the lover whom she most wants to see again.

In addition to Henry and Aunt Augusta, there are two strong supporting characters.

- Wordsworth: Aunt Augusta's current lover when she meets Henry. If Aunt Augusta is the amoral centre of the novel, Wordsworth is its moral centre. He is devoted to Augusta and will do anything that she asks. His love and devotion stand in stark opposition to Augusta's cavalier approach to her lovers. He even follows her to Paraguay and helps her reunite with Visconti. His morality and almost unmourned death serves as a counterpoint for Aunt Augusta's pleasure-focused life.
- Mr Visconti: The previous lover who Aunt Augusta is seeking throughout the book. Visconti was a swindler before World War II who then helped the Nazis – specifically, Göring – loot art from wealthy Italians. In the aftermath of the war, he fled as a war criminal. He never expresses regret for his actions with the Nazis, and although Henry finds himself finally feeling ultimately alive as he takes up the career of a smuggler with Visconti, his unrepentant Nazi past is designed to draw into question the ultimate wisdom of Henry's move from his boring, safe life to Aunt Augusta's life of adventure.

George Cukor's film version changed the ending, letting Aunt Augusta choose for the loyal Wordsworth over the treacherous Visconti.

== Reception ==
Karl Ragnar Gierow wrote the novel is "written with a sure hand, a fierce temper and a plot that never tires for a moment, which, however, happens to the reader. The broad-minded burlesque rises to another level at the end, although not one that a Nobel Prize belongs to."

== Adaptations ==
The novel was adapted, with large departures from the original story, for a film in 1972, written by Jay Presson Allen and Hugh Wheeler, and directed by George Cukor, starring Maggie Smith and Alec McCowen.

British playwright and actor Giles Havergal wrote a version for stage, first presented at the Citizens Theatre in Glasgow on 10 November 1989. This stage version was reduced to a 50-minute, one-act version (with permission from Havergal) and first presented by the Backwell Playhouse Theatre Company as an entry into the Avon Association of Art One Act Festival on 21 February 2015.

A BBC radio dramatisation by René Basilico starred Charles Kay and Dame Hilda Bracket in the leading roles. An audiobook recording was made read by Tim Pigott-Smith, who recorded a number of other Greene fictions.

The novel was adapted as a stage musical and was produced at the Chichester Festival Theatre in 2016, starring Patricia Hodge.
