= Giles Havergal =

Scottish theatre director and actor (1938–2025)

Giles Pollock Havergal CBE (9 June 1938 – 23 August 2025) was a Scottish theatre director and actor, opera stage director, teacher and adaptor. He was artistic director of Glasgow's Citizens Theatre from 1969 until he stepped down in 2003, one of the triumvirate of directors at the theatre, alongside Philip Prowse and Robert David MacDonald. Their input and influence within the theatre landscape of Glasgow - and the city itself - were significant, inspiring and supporting several notable actors and designers.

== Early life ==
Giles Pollock Havergal was born in Edinburgh, Scotland on 9 June 1938, to Dr. Henry MacLeod Havergal (died 1989) and his wife, Margaret (nee Chitty).

== Career ==
Havergal was director of Watford Palace Theatre (1965–69) and director of the Citizens Theatre from 1969 to 2003. He directed over 80 plays in Glasgow including works by Shakespeare and Bertolt Brecht, including a number of European works in translation which was unusual for its time - frequently presenting them in new or daring ways. He has also directed over 20 children and family Christmas productions, as well as guest-directing for companies including Scottish Opera, Welsh National Opera, Opera North, Shared Experience, 7:84, Wexford Festival Opera, Buxton Festival, Vancouver Opera, Minnesota Opera, Gelsenkirchen Opera, National Theatre Mannheim.

Havergal's production of Travels with My Aunt, adapted from the Graham Greene novel of the same title, was first presented in Glasgow in 1989 and then played in the West End where it won a Laurence Olivier Award in 1993, and off Broadway in 1995.

Havergal's production of his and Robert David Macdonald's adaptation of Death in Venice by Thomas Mann was first presented in Glasgow in 2000. It played at the Manhattan Ensemble Theatre, New York City, in 2002, following performances in Stockholm, Copenhagen & Manchester (England). It was revived in 2005 at the American Conservatory Theater, San Francisco.

Havergal was the recipient of the 1994 St Mungo Prize, awarded to the individual who has done most in the previous three years to improve and promote the city of Glasgow. He was awarded a CBE for services to theatre in the 2002 New Year Honours.

== Later life and death ==
In later years Havergal directed Jack and the Beanstalk at the Barbican Centre, The Merry Widow (2010, 2019) and Albert Herring (2013) at Opera North (which The Guardian called "an intimate view of village politics in all their cacophonous glory"); he adapted several plays (including for Steppenwolf) and played Nagg in Endgame at the American Conservatory Theater, San Francisco.

He also taught at Royal Conservatoire of Scotland, RADA, the National Opera Studio and the American Conservatory Theater, San Francisco.

Havergal died on 23 August 2025, at the age of 87.

== Sources ==
- "Giles Havergal, Agent, Gavin Barker Ascociates". 2014.
- "Giles Havergal Biography". filmreference. 2008.
- "Biographies: Giles Havergal - Former Artistic Director". Citizens Theatre. 2009.
