= Philip Prowse =

British theatre director

Philip Prowse (born 29 December 1937) is a stage director and designer, and was one of the triumvirate of directors at the Citizens Theatre in Glasgow, Scotland, from 1970 until 2004.

== Early life and education ==
Prowse was born in England and trained at the Slade School of Fine Art in London.

== Career ==
He moved to Scotland in 1969, From 1970 he was a co-director of the Citizens Theatre with Giles Havergal and Robert David MacDonald, having previously worked with Havergal at the Watford Palace Theatre. Prowse's last production at the Citizens Theatre was Thomas Otway's Venice Preserv'd in 2004. He directed and designed over 70 plays with the Citizens Theatre and has worked throughout the world designing and directing for opera, ballet and drama.

Long term artistic collaborators include those with actor Glenda Jackson and director/choreographer Geoffrey Cauley.

MacDonald's English translation of Racine's Phèdre, titled Phedra, was produced at The Old Vic in November 1984, designed and directed by Prowse and with Glenda Jackson in the title role and Robert Eddison as Theramenes. The costume which he designed for Jackson's performance is in the Victoria and Albert Museum.

Up to his retirement Prowse also taught on the Theatre Design MFA course at the Slade School of Fine Art.

== Recognition ==
There are two paintings of Prowse by Adrian Wiszniewski, commissioned by Scottish National Portrait Gallery, completed in 1995 and in their collections. There is also a photograph taken around 2004 by Richard Campbell, also in the collection.

National Life Stories conducted an oral history interview with Hudson in 2005 for its An Oral History of Theatre Design collection held by the British Library.
