= Jo Beddoe =

English arts administrator and theatre producer (1944–2018)

Josephine "Jo" Beddoe
- Born: 7 August 1944; Halifax, West Yorkshire, England
- Died: 20 February 2018 (aged 73); Scarborough, North Yorkshire, England
- Education: Middlesex University
- Known for: Arts administrator and theatre producer

Josephine "Jo" Beddoe (7 August 1944 – 20 February 2018) was an arts administrator and theatre producer from Yorkshire.

== Early life ==
Beddoe was born in Halifax, England – where her father George edited the Halifax Courier and her mother Barbara was a youth worker specialising in working with homeless young people – and attended Trinity Junior School and Crossley and Porter Secondary School, before embarking upon a teacher training degree at Trent Park Teacher Training College (Middlesex University), London.

== Teaching ==
Beddoe taught Drama and English in schools in Croxteth, Liverpool, before moving to London, where in 1970 she taught English and Liberal Studies at West Ham College. During her time teaching in London, Beddoe also became the co-ordinator of an adult literacy scheme (at Southgate Technical College) and was a student liaison officer.

== Career transition ==
In 1977, Beddoe made the transition from teacher to arts administrator; she was appointed coordinator of The Factory (which changed its name to The Yaa Asantewaa Arts and Community Centre and is now known as The Yaa Centre) in Maida Vale – a thriving community arts centre which showcased African and Caribbean arts and culture. During this time, she became a founder member of the Black Theatre Co-operative and initiated a writer-in-residence scheme, first with Mustapha Matura and then with Caryl Philips; Beddoe went on to serve on the Black Theatre Co-operative's board, before departing London, as she was appointed the director of the Lancaster Literature Festival in 1980 and Drama Officer at the Arts Council of Great Britain in 1981.

Beddoe returned to Liverpool in 1982 to become general manager of Liverpool Playhouse at the same time of the so-called Gang of Four – playwrights Alan Bleasdale, Willy Russell, Chris Bond and Bill Morrison – who were joint artistic directors. Beddoe oversaw the first West End transfer of Russell's play Blood Brothers to the Lyric Theatre, as well as co-ordinating the theatre's education scheme and the Black Arts Festival.

== 7:84 and Scotland ==
In 1988, Beddoe joined Scottish theatre company 7:84 as a producer. Founding artistic director John McGrath had recently left the company with David Hayman and Gerard Kelly appointed; with their funding under threat Beddoe managed to sustain the company financially and oversaw revivals of No Mean City and Hector MacMillan's The Sash, as well as premiering Bold Girls by Rona Munro, and developing opportunities for younger writers.
