= TAG Theatre Company =

Coordinates: 55°51′3.5″N 4°15′11.5″W

TAG Theatre Company is a theatre company established in 1967 in Glasgow, Scotland as the outreach arm of the Citizens' Theatre in Glasgow, and was known as the Citizens' Theatre for Youth.

== Background ==
It is the longest-established touring theatre company in Scotland. The company changed its name from Citizens' Theatre for Youth in the 1970s and became TAG, which stood for Theatre About Glasgow. Recent times have seen a change in funding for the company and the introduction of a Scotland-wide remit. As a consequence the company now simply uses the initials "TAG".

== Artistic directors ==
TAG's original artistic director was Christine Redington, who was at the helm for three years until 1971. Since then a number of high-profile directors have worked for the company, including Ian Wooldridge (1978–84), Ian Brown (1984–88) now at West Yorkshire Playhouse, Alan Lyddiard who left TAG to become artistic director of Northern Stage Ensemble in Newcastle (1988–92), and Tony Graham, now at the Unicorn Theatre in London (1992–97). James Brining was with TAG from 1997 to 2003, before taking up post as artistic director at Dundee Rep Theatre. After a brief period under the direction of Emily Gray (previously associate director at The Unicorn Theatre in London), TAG's current artistic director is Guy Hollands, who joined the company from his positions as freelance director and Gorbals Drama Worker at the Citizens Theatre, Glasgow. Guy is joint artistic director of the Citizens Theatre, alongside Jeremy Raison.

== TAG and the Citizens' Theatre ==
In 2006 TAG moved back into the Citizens Theatre building in the Gorbals area of Glasgow. TAG was fully reintegrated with the Citizens Theatre in 2007 as a member of the Citizens' Theatre Ltd. In 2007, TAG Acting Company celebrated its 40th anniversary.
