= The Islands Book Trust =

The Islands book Trust is a project based on the Hebridean Isle of Lewis, aims to further understanding of the history of Scottish islands in their wider Celtic and Nordic contexts through:

- events including talks, visits, and conferences
- publications
- research and education.
