= Laurance Rudic =

British theatre artist (born 1952)

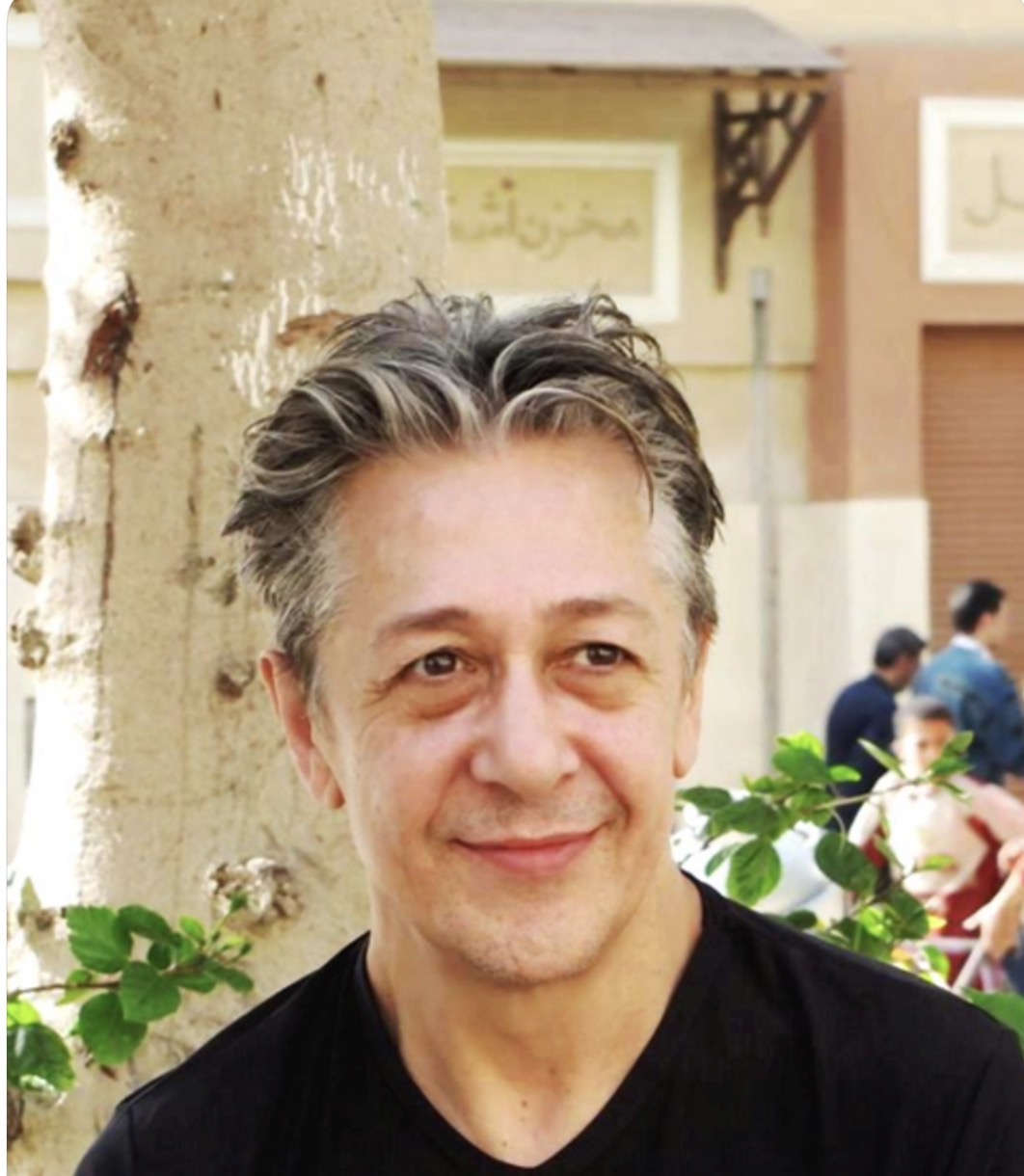
- Laurance Rudic, Citizens Theatre
- Born: 10 September 1952 (age 73); Glasgow, Scotland
- Occupation: Stage actor
- Years active: 1969–present
- Known for: Citizens Theatre (1972–1996), Royal National Theatre (1985–1986), West End productions
- Notable work: And God Created (2006); Mother Courage and Her Children (1989–1990, with Glenda Jackson)

Laurance Rudic (born 10 September 1952) is a Scottish stage actor. He is best known for his long association with Giles Havergal's Citizens Repertory Theatre in Glasgow, his appearances in London's West End, his work with the Ian McKellen–Edward Petherbridge Company at the Royal National Theatre, and his later solo projects and workshops based on embodied acting process.
