= Dundee Repertory Theatre =

Theatre in Dundee, Scotland

- Dundee Rep
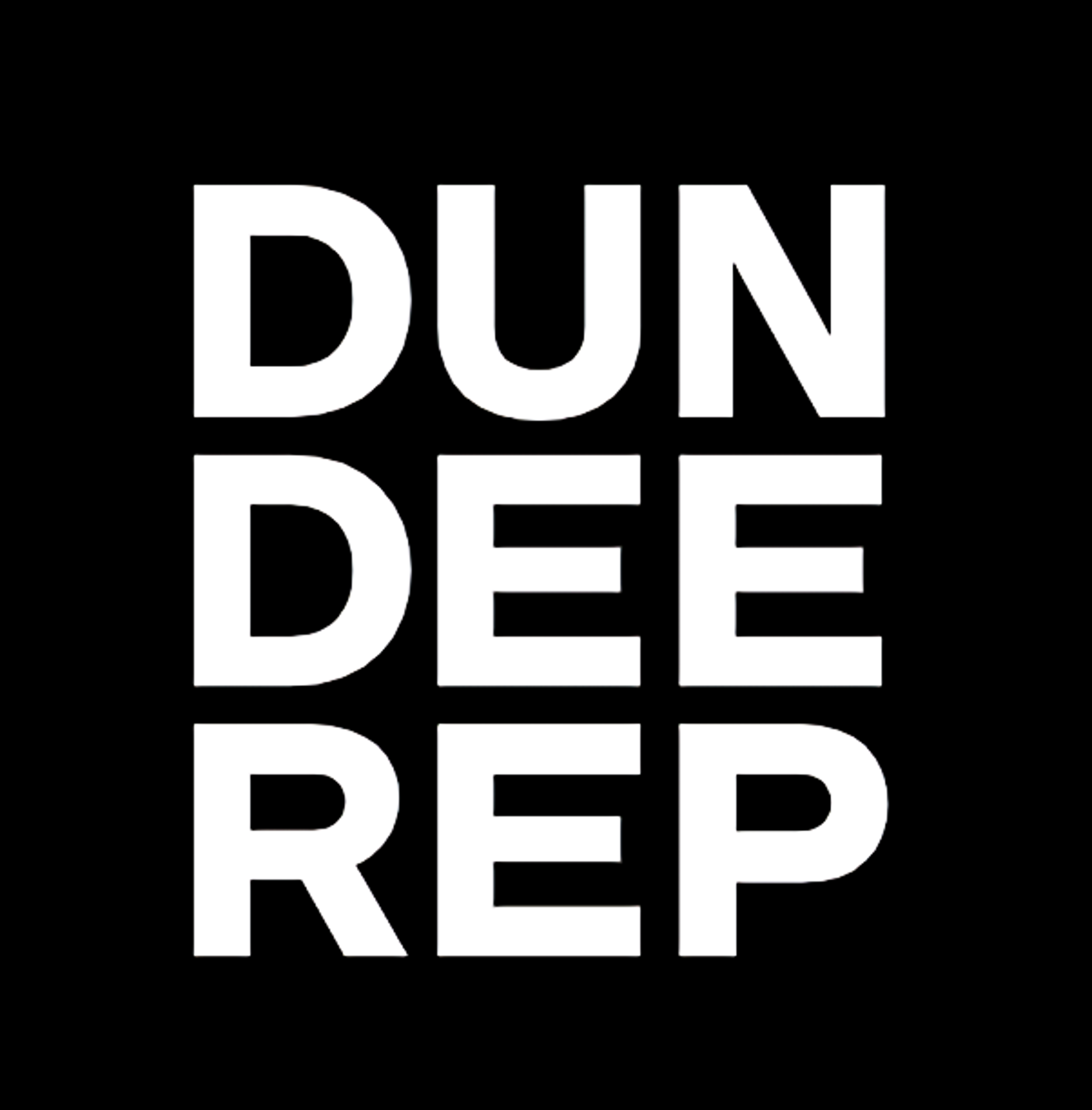

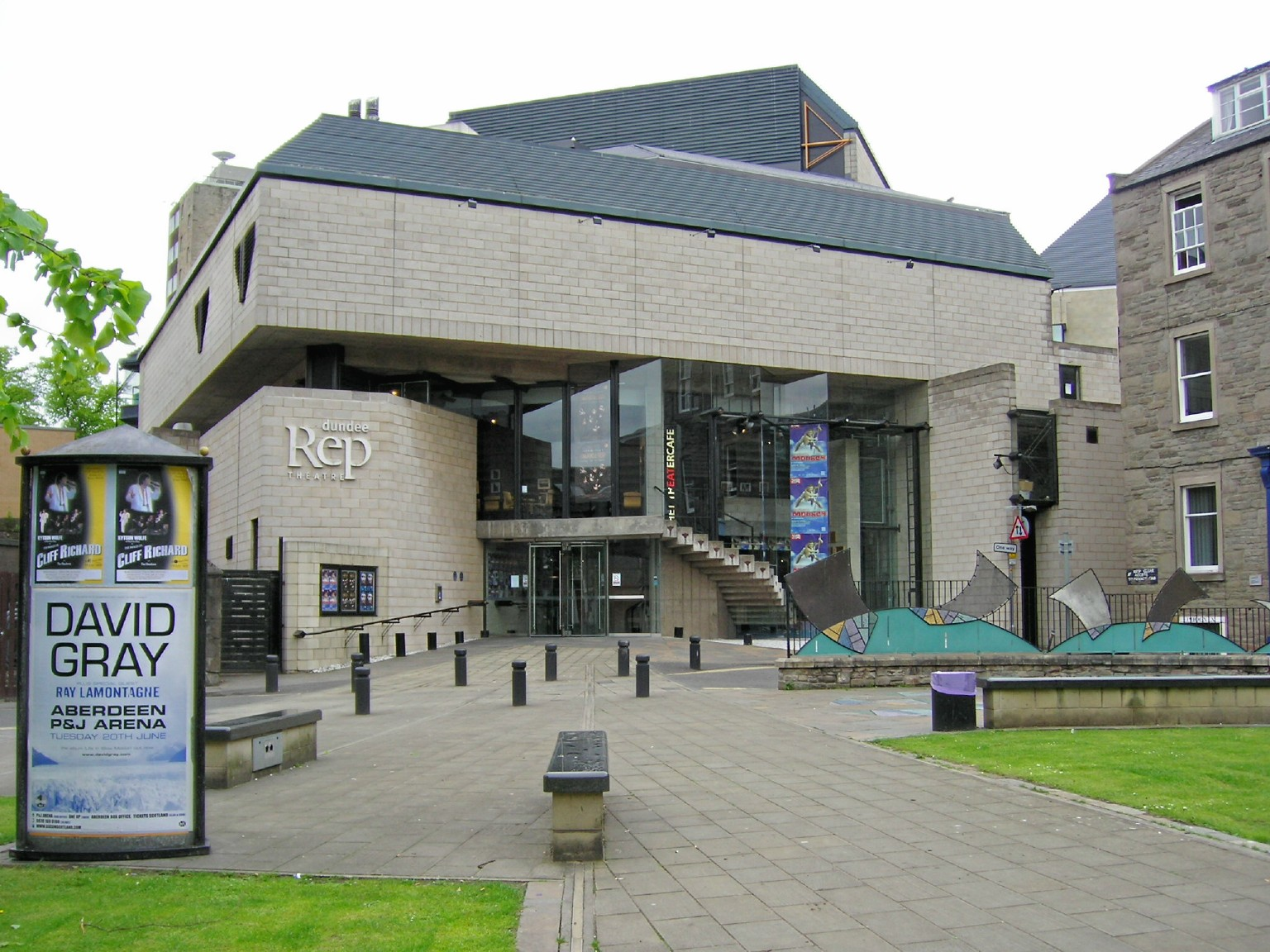
- Interactive map of Dundee Repertory Theatre
- Location: Dundee, Scotland
- Type: Repertory theatre

Construction
- Built: 1979–1982
- Opened: 8 April 1982
- Years active: 1931–present
- Architect: Nicoll Russell Studios

Tenants
- Scottish Dance Theatre; Dundee Rep Ensemble

Website
- dundeerep.co.uk

Dundee Repertory Theatre, better known simply as the Dundee Rep, is a theatre and arts company in Dundee, Scotland. It operates as both a producing house with some shows co-produced by other theatres and a receiving house – hosting work from visiting companies throughout Scotland and the United Kingdom including drama, musicals, contemporary & classical dance, children's theatre, comedy, jazz and opera. It is home to Scotland's principal contemporary dance company, Scottish Dance Theatre. 'The Rep' building is located in Tay Square at the centre of the city’s "cultural quarter" in the West End.

== History ==
=== Foundation ===
Dundee has had a number of purpose-built theatres. Apart from early wooden theatres, the Theatre Royal in Castle Street opened in 1810 and became firmly established from the 1840s until 1885 when the new Her Majesty's Theatre and Opera House opened on the Seagate. Others included the Alhambra – renamed the Whitehall in the 1970s – the Palace, renamed the Theatre Royal in the 1960s, and the King's Theatre in the Cowgate which opened in 1908. By around 1920 many theatres had converted into cinemas, and for most of the 1930s Dundee no longer had a designated drama theatre. Robert Thornely – Manager of the last touring company to perform in Dundee was determined to find a home in the city for his professional theatre company. He approached the Dundee Dramatic Society, an amateur company, who, also faced with nowhere to perform had recently purchased their own premises in the form of a disused jute mill.

In May 1939, Dundee Repertory Theatre was founded as a collaboration between professionals with amateur support. Around this time people thought it strange to be concentrating on drama during the turmoil of World War II. However the company performed weekly repertory during the war and the rest of the 1940s and throughout the 1950s. The company was housed in Foresters' Hall (6 Nicoll street to 3 Rattray Street) which was built for the Ancient Order of Foresters in 1901, when in June 1963 a fire completely destroyed the building and the Rep was forced to live a nomadic existence for a short period. Eventually a temporary refuge was found in the converted former Dudhope Church on the Lochee Road of Dundee although the company remained at the venue for a further 18 years.

In the late 1970s, Charles Nowosielski had his directorial debut at the Rep, directing a series of short plays, including Joan Ure’s Something in it for Cordelia.

=== Construction of the theatre and early years ===
After negotiation with the City of Dundee District Council and the Scottish Arts Council it was agreed that the company would have its own purpose-built premises on land donated by University of Dundee. Work began in January 1979 under the leadership of Robert Robertson who had been artistic director for a number of years and who was instrumental in overseeing the building and completion of the new theatre. However, the building work looked like being stopped in its tracks due to rising prices and inflation. A public appeal was launched which raised a massive £60,000 in under six weeks, reaching an eventual total of £200,000 outstripping all possible expectations, in a city that was then in the midst of economic recession. The new theatre opened on 8 April 1982, designed by Dundee-based architects Nicoll Russell Studios. The building proved a great success – with a personal 455-seater auditorium, providing one of the best stages in Scotland in terms of its relationship with its audience, it received a civic commendation from The Civic Trust Award in 1984 and in 1986 won the RIBA Architecture Award. Robert Robertson retired from Dundee Rep in 1990.

In April 1992 Hamish Glen was appointed artistic director, the same year saw the building extended and undertook a major refurbishment to facilitate a growing community and education department and to include a dance studio as well as extending its existing workshop, wardrobe and rehearsal capacity. In September 1999 it opened its doors to one of the most ambitious experiments in Scottish Theatre for many years – a permanent company of 14 actors.

=== 2000s–2010s ===
James Brining became artistic director in 2003 and during that time the company created over 50 productions. The Ensemble developed its international reputation, being the first UK company to tour to Iran in 30 years with Shakespeare's The Winter's Tale. In 2005, it visited the prestigious Cerventino Festival in Mexico with a new version of Jarry's Ubu the King and in 2006 it took David Greig's Dr Korzcak's Example to Tokyo and Hiroshima. The company has developed co-productions with some of the UK's leading producers including the Barbican, the Young Vic, National Theatre of Scotland, Royal Lyceum Theatre, Edinburgh, The Traverse Theatre Company, Paines Plough and the Tron Theatre, performing in all of Scotland's major venues. The repertoire was broad, encompassing Shakespeare, musicals, American classics, new plays and work for children and young people.

In 2004 a new £1 million dance studio was completed to house Scottish Dance Theatre. The Rep's in-house productions offer a repertoire of works. The Rep also commissions playwrights to create new works and translate and adapt classical texts.

In 2007 Dundee Rep Ensemble created Sunshine on Leith featuring the music of The Proclaimers. It soon became a Scottish favourite and has been seen by more than 200,000 people. In 2013 a film version of the musical premiered at the Toronto Film Festival.

A recent venture was the tour of its production of The Winter's Tale to Iran under the auspices of the British Council's five-year initiative 'Connecting Futures'. This was the first major cultural event to be shown in Iran for 25 years, and the first ever British Council theatre tour to Iran. The set was built entirely in Iran, under the direction of John Miller, the company's production manager and played at the Vahdat Hall, Tehran.

In May 2015, Dundee Repertory Theatre appointed Nick Parr as its new chief executive officer. He took over from Philip Howard, who held the joint roles of CEO and, with Jemima Levick, joint artistic director. He leads Dundee Rep Theatre Ltd solely in the role of chief executive, working alongside Levick as sole artistic director and Fleur Darkin who is artistic director of Scottish Dance Theatre. Levick left the Dundee Repertory Theatre in 2016.

Levick was replaced by Joe Douglas in April 2016 in the role of Associate Artistic Director.

=== 2016–present ===
In July 2016, Andrew Panton was appointed new artistic director at Dundee Rep and took over from Douglas the year afterwards. Since then Dundee Rep have teamed up with National Theatre of Scotland to present the World Première of the cult classic Let The Right One In, collaborated with the Royal Lyceum Theatre, Edinburgh with Time and the Conways, presented the Scottish Premiere of David Greig's Victoria.

The Rep is now home to over 20 resident performers.

In 2022, the building was listed at Category A by Historic Environment Scotland as "A rare and exceptional example of post-war theatre design".

=== Future ===
In September 2018 it was reported that the Rep was considering leaving its current building for new purpose-built premises. The Rep's artistic director Andrew Panton stated that it had outgrown its present home and that the building needed a lot of work. Panton suggested that a newly built theatre should be able to seat 800 to 1000 people (as opposed to the current building's capacity of about 400) and have greater flexibility to be able to house different sizes of audience. He suggested that this could tie in to the Rep's 80th anniversary celebrations in 2019 and be the next major cultural project in Dundee following the completion and opening of V&A Dundee in 2018. As of 2023, these plans have yet to come to fruition, possibly due to the impact of the COVID-19 pandemic and slow audience return in its aftermath.

== Artistic directors ==
- Robert Robertson (1973–1992)
- Hamish Glen (1992–2003)
- Dominic Hill (2003-2009)
- James Brining (2003–2012)
- Phillip Howard (2012–2014)
- Jemima Levick (2012–2016)
- Joe Douglas (2016–2017)
- Andrew Panton (2017–present)

== Notable alumni and players ==
Richard Todd began his acting career with the Company in the 1930s, returning to perform with it after military service in World War II.

Rowena Cooper began her career with the Company in the 1950s.

In 1962, Lynn Redgrave appeared in Ben Travers' Rookery Nook, and as Portia in The Merchant of Venice, which also featured Steven Berkoff and Dundee-born Brian Cox who has gone on to play many roles in TV productions and Hollywood films. In the mid-1960s, a stable repertory company including Jill Gascoine, Vivien Heilbron, Charmian May and Stephen Yardley saw short seasons from visiting actors James Bolam and Michael York. Other past associates include the actress Ann Way. Hannah Gordon was at the Dundee Rep from 1962 to 1963 as was Donald Sutherland. Vivien Heilbron and Heather Ripley were members of the Company in the 1960s.

In 1987 Alan Cumming was at the Rep as Phil McCann in two of the three plays from John Byrne's The Slab Boys Trilogy, 'The Slab Boys' and 'Cuttin' a Rug'. Other alumni include Miriam Margolyes, Joanna Lumley, Geoffrey Hayes (beloved of British TV-viewers as the host of cult children's show Rainbow), and Hannah Gordon.

=== Doctor Who alumni ===
Several actors who would later take on the role of The Doctor from the British sci-fi television series, Doctor Who had performed at or were alumni of the Dundee Rep.

In the 1940s, William Hartnell who played the first incarnation of the Doctor performed in two plays at the theatre, The Rookery Nook and Ghost Train.

In the early 1990s, David Tennant appeared in several productions starting with a role in The Princess and the Goblin before making his big break in television and going on to portray the Tenth Doctor and the Fourteenth Doctor.

Ncuti Gatwa, who would go on and play the Fifteenth Doctor, started his career and was granted a position in a graduate scheme, at the Dundee Rep in 2013 where he went on to perform in several roles including one in David Greig's Victoria.

Joanna Lumley who portrayed the Female Doctor in the Comic Relief special, "The Curse of Fatal Death" also starred in several plays at the theatre.

Other Rep alumni who have appeared in Doctor Who include Alan Cumming, Miriam Margolyes, and Brian Cox.

== Archives ==
The archives of the Rep, covering the period c1936 to 2010, are held by Archive Services, University of Dundee. They include programmes and photographs of stars such as Joanna Lumley, Michael York, David Tennant and Gregor Fisher performing at the theatre. Material from the Rep collection was displayed as a key part of a major exhibition on Dundee and theatre held at the Lamb Gallery, University of Dundee in late 2009 and early 2010. Archive Services also hold various other collections relating to the Rep.
